= Uzhaikkum Karangal =

- Theatrical release poster
- Directed by: K. Shankar
- Written by: Nanjil Ki. Manogaran
- Produced by: Kovai Chezhiyan
- Starring: M. G. Ramachandran; Latha; Bhavani
- Cinematography: P.L.Rav
- Edited by: K.Shankar-E.A.Dhandapani
- Music by: M. S. Viswanathan
- Production company: K.C. Films
- Release date: 23 May 1976
- Running time: 165 minutes
- Country: India
- Language: Tamil

Uzhaikkum Karangal (transl. Toiling Hands) is a 1976 Indian Tamil-language film directed by K. Shankar, and written by Nanjil Ki. Manogaran. The film stars M. G. Ramachandran, Latha and Bhavani. It was released on 23 May 1976.

== Plot ==
Rangan is a poor man who finds employment in the house of Akkilandham. He works hard and finds love in Muthamma after some initial tiff. Gowri, widowed daughter of Akkilandam propositions him but he turns down accepting her as a sister. She however falls in the trap of Kabali who masquerades as a godman. He drugs, seduces and impregnates her before running off. The blame falls on Rangan, whom no one believes except Muthamma. Rangan traces and finds Kabali, makes him confess and marries him off to Gowri thereby clearing his name.

== Cast ==
- M. G. Ramachandran as Rangan
- Latha as Muthamma
- Bhavani as Kumari Pankajam
- Kumari Padmini as Gowri
- Pandari Bai as Annam
- C. K. Saraswathi as Akkilandham
- Baby Rajkumari as Ramu
- K. A. Thangavelu as Nagalingham
- Thengai Srinivasan as Kabali
- Nagesh as Saba / Kitha
- K. Kannan as Karnaya
- V. S. Raghavan as Sendhil Nadhan
- V. Gopalakrishnan as Thanga Durai
- Shanmugasundaram as Public prosecutor
- Karikol Raju as Kumaresan
- Usilai Mani as Iyer
- Selvaraj as Fake saint
- Peeli Sivam as Drunker
- T. K. S. Natarajan as Villager
- Sathya as Villager

== Production ==
After the film got censored, the songs "Naalai Ulagai" and "Aadiya Paadhangal" were shot at Bangalore. This is the Tamil debut for actress Bhavani.

== Soundtrack ==
The music was composed by M. S. Viswanathan.

Track listing
No.	Title	Lyrics	Singer(s)	Length
1.	"Aadiya Paadhankal Ambalaththil"	Pulamaipithan	P. Susheela	04:15
2.	"Pazhath Thottam"	Muthulingam	Vani Jairam	03:24
3.	"Vaaren Vazhi Paarththirupen"	Muthulingam	T. M. Soundararajan & T. K. Kala	04:07
4.	"Kandhanukku Maalai Yittaal"	Muthulingam	Vani Jairam	04:18
5.	"Naalai Ulagai Aala Vendum"	Pulamaipithan	K. J. Yesudas & M. S. Viswanathan	04:24
6.	"Intha Nattu Nadappu"	Vaali	P. Susheela	06:11
Total length:				26:39

== Critical reception ==
Kanthan of Kalki wrote that, for people who do not expect and care about unique plot, character development and who enjoy the entertaining features of scenic views, catchy dialogues and catchy songs will definitely not be disappointing when they watch Uzhaikkum Karangal. Nagai Dharman of Navamani praised the dialogues, acting, music, fights, dance, humour and direction.
