= Sivagamiyin Selvan =

1974 film by C. V. Rajendran

- Poster
- Directed by: C. V. Rajendran
- Written by: A. L. Narayanan (dialogues)
- Story by: Sachin Bhowmick
- Produced by: N. Kanagasabai
- Starring: Sivaji Ganesan; Vanisri; Latha
- Cinematography: Masthan
- Edited by: B. Kanthasamy
- Music by: M. S. Viswanathan
- Production company: Jayanthi Films
- Release date: 26 January 1974
- Running time: 154 minutes
- Country: India
- Language: Tamil

Sivakamiyin Selvan (transl. Sivakami's son) is a 1974 Indian Tamil-language film directed by C. V. Rajendran, starring Sivaji Ganesan, Vanisri and Latha. It is a remake of the Hindi film Aradhana (1969). The film was released on 26 January 1974.

== Plot ==
Indian Air Force pilot Flight Lieutenant Ashok is in love with Sivakami. They have a secret wedding and Sivakami becomes pregnant. Ashok dies in a plane crash soon after. Looking for support, Sivakami tells her father about her pregnancy, but he dies too, leaving Sivakami alone with her newborn child, who she names Ananth. Fearing being shamed for having an illegitimate child, Sivakami places Ananth in an orphanage, with the idea of adopting him the next day, thus concealing his origin. Before she can adopt Ananth, a rich man whose wife had already lost many children and had lost one again, comes to the orphanage, and adopts Ananth.

When she realises what has happened, Sivakami goes to the rich man's house and explains the situation. He takes pity on her, and hires her as a servant so that she can be close to her son. He also emphasises that Sivakami must not reveal her relationship to Ananth to his wife, who is fond of Ananth. She promises him that she would not. Meanwhile, the wife's brother sees Sivakami, and wants to marry her. When she rejects his proposal, he tries to rape her, but Ananth kills him with scissors. Sivakami tells Ananth to leave the scene, and takes the blame for him by picking up the scissors and claiming that she is the killer. She is arrested.

20 years later, Sivakami is released from prison. Meanwhile, the rich man's wife learns of Sivakami's history from her husband, and she is shocked. Sivakami returns to their home, and is met there by a girl living there, Kavitha. They get along well, and Kavitha takes Sivakami to the airport to meet her fiancé, who turns out to be Ananth. However, he does not recognise Sivakami as he was much younger when he last saw her. One day he finds a diary and sees pictures of his parents, and himself with his mother. He then realises who Sivakami is, and asks her to come to his awards ceremony. During the ceremony, he asks his mother to present him with the award, to which she agrees. The film ends with Sivakami and Ananth on the stage together.

== Cast ==
- Sivaji Ganesan as Ashok and Ananth
- Vanisri as Sivakami
- Latha as Kavitha
- A. V. M. Rajan as Wing Commander Raghu
- S. V. Ranga Rao as Chakravarthi
- S. V. Sahasranamam as Dr. Ramanathan
- T. K. Bhagavathi as Sankar
- M. N. Rajam as Parvathi
- R. S. Manohar as America Mama
- V. S. Raghavan as Kavitha's father
- Srikanth as Ravi
- Cho as Sigamani
- V. Nagayya as Church Father
- Senthamarai as Climax Lawyer
- A. K. Veerasamy as Ashok's uncle
- S. N. Parvathi as Eswari
- Usilai Mani as Iyer
- Master Srikumar as Child Ananth

== Production ==
Sivagamiyin Selvan is a remake of the Hindi film Aradhana (1969). It is the only film where Sivaji Ganesan and Latha acted together. Some scenes and songs were shot at Darjeeling. The filming ended with the shoot of a song sequence at Thekkady.

== Soundtrack ==
The music was composed by M. S. Viswanathan. Donot edit. LPs shared and lyricists are in order

Song	Singers	Lyrics	Length
"Ullam Rendum"	T. M. Soundararajan	Vaali	04:43
"Ethanai Azhagu"	S. P. Balasubrahmanyam	Pulamaipithan	04:28
"Aadikku Pinne Avani matham"	T. M. Soundararajan, L. R. Eswari	kannadasan	04:30
"Iniyavale"	T. M. Soundararajan, P. Susheela	Pulamaipithan	04:43
"Mela Thaalam"	T. M. Soundararajan, P. Susheela	kannadasan	03:30
"Yedarkkum Oru Kaalam Varum-(Inbathilum)"	M. S. Viswanathan	Vaali	04:13
"En Rajavin Rojamugam"	P. Susheela	Vaali	04:23

== Release and reception ==
Sivagamiyin Selvan was released on 26 January 1974. The magazine Kumudam positively reviewed the film, comparing it favourably to the Hindi original. According to Rajendran, the film did not do well as the Hindi original ran well in Chennai for one year and felt remaking it was a wrong decision.
