= Idhayakkani =

1975 film by A. Jagannathan

- Theatrical release poster
- Directed by: A. Jagannathan
- Screenplay by: R. M. Veerappan
- Story by: Poovai Krishnan
- Produced by: R. M. Veerappan
- Starring: M. G. Ramachandran; Radha Saluja
- Cinematography: N. Balakrishnan
- Edited by: Krishnan; Sundaram
- Music by: M. S. Viswanathan
- Production company: Sathya Movies
- Release date: 22 August 1975
- Running time: 160 minutes
- Country: India
- Language: Tamil

Idhayakkani (transl. The Fruit of the Heart) is a 1975 Indian Tamil-language action thriller film directed by A. Jagannathan and produced by R. M. Veerappan, starring M. G. Ramachandran in the lead role, with Pandari Bai, R. S. Manohar and Radha Saluja among others enacting supporting roles. It was released on 22 August 1975 and became a major success. Idhayakkani was notably the only Indian film to be screened at the Tashkent International Film Festival in 1978.

== Plot ==
Mohan is a kind-hearted man whose theory of life is equality. He puts it into practice by sharing equally the income of his estate with his labourers. He has another passion – he wants to serve the country – and for that, he has joined the police force as an officer. He meets a needy, innocent, uneducated, village girl, Lakshmi, and on the advice of an elderly domestic help, he permits her to stay in his house.

Tongues start wagging, rumours spread and to remove the stigma now associated with her name, Mohan decides to marry the girl with her and his mother's consent. He joins duty. However, his happiness is short-lived. He is surprised when he discovers his wife's photo in the file of the case he is assigned to investigate which involves the murder of a leading scientist, as the main suspect. He is shocked but decides to do his duty and begins to investigate by first checking if his wife is really as innocent as she looks. He then takes the battle to other side by infiltrating the gang and in the end, finds the truth.

== Cast ==
- M. G. Ramachandran as Mohan (Red)
- Radha Saluja as Lakshmi, alias Mala
- Manohar as Albert
- Thengai Srinivasan as Rangarajan (Julie)
- C. R. Parthiban as Inspector
- K. Kannan as Kannan
- V. Gopalakrishnan as Madhavarao
- S. V. Ramdas as Dass, a hired man
- Isari Velan as Isari, Mohan's personal secretary
- Vennira Aadai Nirmala as a female singer in "Thotta Idam Ellam"
- Pandari Bai as Mohan's mother
- Rajasulochana as Lily
- Shanmugasundari as Mohan's relative
- Shamugasundaram as Nattamai's son
- Karikol Raju as Panchayat leader
- Peeli Sivam as Hotel manager
- Usilai Mani as Astrologer
- Ennathe Kannaiah as Tour guide
- T. K. S. Natarajan as Iyer
- Trichy Soundararajan as C.I.D officer

Guest appearances

- S. V. Subbaiah as Ponnuswamy
- P. S. Veerappa as Uncle John
- V. S. Raghavan as The judge
- Shakti Prasad as Dharma Prakash, an atomic power scientist
- Rathna as Kamala, a picker from Mohan's Sathiya Coffee Estate Mohan, Neega Nallairukkanu

== Production ==
Idhayakkani is the debut of Hindi actress Radha Saluja in Tamil. The filming was held at Hogenakkal, Mercara, Pichavaram and Shivanasamudra Falls.

== Soundtrack ==
The music was composed by M. S. Viswanathan. The song "Inbame Undhan Per" was remixed by Vijay Antony for the film Mariyadhai (2009).

Track listing
No.	Title	Lyrics	Singer(s)	Length
1.	"Neenga Nallaa Irukkonum (Thenagamam Inbath Thirunattil)"	Pulamaipithan	Seerkazhi Govindarajan, T. M. Soundararajan, S. Janaki	06:21
2.	"Inbame Undhan Pear"	Pulamaipithan	T. M. Soundararajan & P. Susheela	04:56
3.	"Ondrum Ariyaatha penno (Punnaigaiyl Kodi)"	Vaali	T. M. Soundararajan	04:39
4.	"Hello Lover Mister Right"	Randor Guy	Usha Uthup	04:42
5.	"Ithazhe Ithazhe Thean vendum"	Vaali	S. P. Balasubrahmanyam & Ramola	04:31
6.	"Thotta Idam Ellaam (Azhagai Vallarpom)"	Na. Kamarasan	T. M. Soundararajan, P. Susheela & Sai Baba	04:42
Total length:				29:51

== Release and reception ==
Idhayakkani was released on 22 August 1975. Ananda Vikatan praised the film for depicting Mercara's greenery and the horror of the Pichavaram backwaters, along with the music and colour cinematography. Kanthan of Kalki praised the writing by Veerappan, and the direction of Jagannathan. The film became a major success, and a breakthrough for Jagannathan.
