= Shankar Salim Simon =

1978 film by P. Madhavan

- Theatrical release poster
- Directed by: P. Madhavan
- Written by: Balamurugan
- Produced by: T. K. Gopinath
- Starring: Vijayakumar; Manjula Vijayakumar; Rajinikanth; Latha; Jai Ganesh; M. S. Vasanthi
- Cinematography: P. N. Sundaram
- Edited by: R. Devarajan
- Music by: M. S. Viswanathan
- Production company: Abhirami
- Release date: 10 February 1978
- Running time: 112 minutes
- Country: India
- Language: Tamil

Shankar Salim Simon is a 1978 Indian Tamil-language masala film directed by P. Madhavan. It stars Vijayakumar as Shankar, Jai Ganesh as Salim and Rajinikanth as Simon. The film was inspired by the 1977 Hindi film Amar Akbar Anthony, and was released on 10 February 1978.

== Plot ==
Simon and Salim come from a lower class, while Shankar and his sister are the children of a corrupt businessman. Latha falls in love with Simon, while Shankar falls in love with Alamelu and Salim is already married. In different circumstances, Latha is forced to marry a man, but she runs away from him and lives with Simon. The society goes against both Simon and Latha and in the end, Latha explains how bad the man she is married to is and unites with Simon.

== Cast ==
- Vijayakumar as Shankar
- Manjula as Alamelu
- Rajinikanth as Simon
- Latha as Vasanthi
- Jai Ganesh as Salim
- M. S. Vasanthi as Mumtaz
- V. S. Raghavan as Sadhasivam
- S. V. Ramadas as Jaipal
- Suruli Rajan as Kabali
- Y. G. Parthasarathy as Vedhachalam
- Y. G. Mahendran as Mahesh
- Manorama as Mariyamma
- Peeli Sivam as Razak Bhai
- Vellai Subbaiah as Liquor Seller

== Production ==
Shankar Salim Simon was adapted from the 1977 Hindi film Amar Akbar Anthony, but only retained the concept of the three title characters belonging to different religions of India: Hinduism, Islam and Christianity.

== Soundtrack ==
All songs were written by Kannadasan and composed by M. S. Viswanathan.

| Title | Singer(s) | Length |
|---|---|---|
| "Vanthaale Oru" | S. P. Balasubrahmanyam, P. Susheela | 3:00 |
| "Sindhu Nadhi Poovey" | M. S. Viswanathan, S. Janaki | 3:05 |
| "Idhu Undhan" | Vani Jairam | 3:00 |
| "Gopurathile" | Kovai Sounderarajan | 4:17 |

== Reception ==
Ananda Vikatan gave the film a mixed review, criticising the makeup, actors' diction and excessive fight scenes.
