= Latha (actress) =

Indian actress

- Born: Nalini Sethupathi; 7 June 1953 (age 73); Tamil Nadu, India
- Other name: Latha
- Occupation: Actress
- Years active: 1973–1984; 1992–2012; 2016–present
- Spouse: Sabapathy (married in 1983)
- Children: 2
- Father: Shanmugha Rajeswara Sethupathi
- Relatives: Rajkumar Sethupathi (brother)

Latha Sethupathi, also known as Latha, is an Indian actress who starred in leading roles in South Indian films from 1973 to 1983. Latha became popular through her roles opposite MGR. She is also known for her roles in various Tamil television series.

== Early life ==
Latha Sethupathi was born into the Sethupathi clan, the royal family of Ramnad, in Tamil Nadu, India. She is the daughter of politician Shanmugha Rajeswara Sethupathi; her mother was named Leelarani. As her mother was not her father's official wife, Latha's status within the family was considered illegitimate. She has a brother, actor Rajkumar Sethupathy, and half-brothers Dasarathan Sethupathi and Ramanatha Sethupathi. Latha's fluency in both Tamil and Telugu stemmed from her mother's origin in Kurnool, Andhra Pradesh. Her father died in 1967, when she was still a young girl.

== Career ==
She started her career at the age of fifteen with encouragement from her aunt, actress Kamala Kotnis. Her first film was Ulagam Sutrum Valiban (1973), starring and produced by M. G. Ramachandran. M.G Ramachandran recommended her for the role alongside Akkineni Nageswara Rao for Andala Ramudu (1973), marking her debut in Telugu films.

She specialized playing roles in Tamil and Telugu films. She played Zeenat Aman's role in the two remakes of Yaadon Ki Baaraat (1973): the Telugu film, Annadammula Anubandham (1975) and the Tamil film Naalai Namadhe (1975). She played Jaya Bhaduri's role from Zanjeer (1973) in the Telugu remake Nippulanti Manishi (1974), and the Tamil remake, Sirithu Vazha Vendum (1974). She won a Filmfare Award for her performance in Vattathukkul Sadhuram (1978).

She was also briefly involved in politics, following her father Shanmugha Rajeswara Sethupathi, the Raja of Ramnad.

After a hiatus of 14 years, she began acting again in Tamil and Telugu series. In 2002, she played a mother-in-law role in the Telugu television series Eenati Ramayanam, Pavithrabandham, and Matti Manishi. Latha had impressed audience with her act on the small screen as well, and has been part of many TV soaps, including Chithi, Selvi, Arasi and Chandrakumari.

== Politics ==
She was one of the founding member of AIADMK. When MGR founded the party, Latha joined and donated money.

== Personal life ==
She married Sabapathy, a businessman from Singapore, in 1983. She has two sons, Karthik and Srinivas. Following her marriage, she gradually reduced her acting commitments, focusing more on her personal life. Despite stepping away from the limelight, she has remained a well-known figure in Tamil cinema.

== Notable filmography ==
| Year | Film | Role | Language |
|---|---|---|---|
| 1973 | Ulagam Sutrum Valiban | Lilly | Tamil |
| 1973 | Gandhi Puttina Desham | | Telugu |
| 1973 | Veettukku Vandha Marumagal | | Tamil |
| 1973 | Andala Ramudu | Sita | Telugu |
| 1974 | Netru Indru Naalai | Sumathi | Tamil |
| 1974 | Sirithu Vazha Vendum | Mala | Tamil |
| 1974 | Urimai Kural | Radha | Tamil |
| 1974 | Chamundeshwari Mahime | | Kannada |
| 1974 | Sorgathil Thirumanam | | Tamil |
| 1974 | Sivakamiyin Selvan | Kavitha | Tamil |
| 1974 | Nippulanti Manishi | Lakshmi | Telugu |
| 1974 | Intinti Katha | | Telugu |
| 1974 | Ammayi Pelli | Padmini / Puppy | Telugu |
| 1975 | Pallandu Vazhga | Saroja | Tamil |
| 1975 | Naalai Namadhe | Rani | Tamil |
| 1975 | Ninaithadhai Mudippavan | Mohana | Tamil |
| 1975 | Niramaala | | Malayalam |
| 1975 | Anbu Roja | | Tamil |
| 1975 | Rakta Sambandhalu | | Telugu |
| 1975 | Annadammula Anubandham | Sunitha / Sony | Telugu |
| 1976 | Padi Pantalu | Leela | Telugu |
| 1976 | Needhikku Thalaivanangu | Vimala | Tamil |
| 1976 | Uzhaikkum Karangal | Muthamma | Tamil |
| 1976 | Manamaara Vazhthungal | | Tamil |
| 1976 | Magaadu | Geeta | Telugu |
| 1977 | Meenava Nanban | Kamali | Tamil |
| 1977 | Navarathinam | Manikkum | Tamil |
| 1977 | Kurukshetram | Satyabhama | Telugu |
| 1978 | Madhuraiyai Meetta Sundharapandiyan | Kayalvizhi | Tamil |
| 1978 | Devadasi | Manjari | Kannada |
| 1978 | Shankar Salim Simon | Vasanthi | Tamil |
| 1978 | Vayasu Ponnu | | Tamil |
| 1978 | Prathyaksha Daivam | | Malayalam |
| 1978 | Prema Paga | | Telugu |
| 1978 | Kumara Raja | | Telugu |
| 1978 | Simha Garjana | | Telugu |
| 1978 | Aayiram Jenmangal | Savithri | Tamil |
| 1978 | Ahalya | | Malayalam |
| 1978 | Varuvan Vadivelan | Uma | Tamil |
| 1978 | Vayanadan Thamban | | Malayalam |
| 1978 | Vattathukkul Chaduram | Anu | Tamil |
| 1978 | Kannamoochi | | Tamil |
| 1979 | Andadu Aagadu | Latha | Telugu |
| 1979 | Sankhu Teertham | | Telugu |
| 1979 | Pancha Bhoothalu | | Telugu |
| 1979 | Neeya? | Latha | Tamil |
| 1979 | Gnana Kuzhandhai | Ponni | Tamil |
| 1979 | Suprabatham | | Tamil |
| 1979 | Urvashi Neene Nanna Preyasi | | Kannada |
| 1979 | Urvasi Neeve Naa Preyasi | | Telugu |
| 1979 | Malligai Mohini | | Tamil |
| 1979 | Needhikku Mun Neeya Naana | | Tamil |
| 1979 | Srungara Ramudu | Shanti | Telugu |
| 1979 | Ramabanam | | Telugu |
| 1979 | Azhage Unnai Aarathikkiren | Vani | Tamil |
| 1979 | Pancha Bhoothalu | | Telugu |
| 1980 | Love in Singapore | Sudha | Malayalam |
| 1980 | Ramudu Parasuramudu | | Telugu |
| 1980 | Love in Singapore | Sudha | Telugu |
| 1980 | Raman Parasuraman | | Tamil |
| 1980 | Anna Paravai | | Tamil |
| 1981 | Oru Iravu Oru Paravai | | Tamil |
| 1981 | Pinneyum Pookkunna Kadu | | Malayalam |
| 1981 | Deiva Thirumanangal | Parvathy / Meenatchi | Tamil |
| 1981 | Devi Dharisanam | | Tamil |
| 1981 | Parvathy | Parvathi Bhai | Malayalam |
| 1981 | Antha | Rajni | Kannada |
| 1981 | Samskaram | | Malayalam |
| 1982 | Erattai Manithan | Kannamma | Tamil |
| 1982 | Ilaya Magan | | Tamil |
| 1992 | Amaran | | Tamil |
| 1994 | Raja Pandi | | Tamil |
| 1997 | Vasuki | Parvatham | Tamil |
| 1997 | Rettai Jadai Vayasu | Anjali's mother | Tamil |
| 1998 | Ponnu Velayira Bhoomi | ushpa's mother | Tamil |
| 1999 | Pudhu Kudithanam | Seethalakshmi | Tamil |
| 1999 | Thachiledathu Chundan | | Malayalam |
| 2000 | Kandha Kadamba Kathir Vela | Parvathi amma | Tamil |
| 2004 | Jana | Jana's aunt | Tamil |
| 2006 | Kusthi | | Tamil |
| 2010 | Vallakottai | Easwara Pandian's mother | Tamil |
| 2018 | Nagesh Thiraiyarangam | Dr. Sakuntala | Tamil |
| 2022 | The Legend | Saravanan's mother | Tamil |

== Television ==
=== Series ===
| Year | Title | Role | Language | Channel |
|---|---|---|---|---|
| 1999–2000 | Idhi Katha Kadu | | Telugu | ETV |
| 2000 | Chithi | Rajeshwari | Tamil | Sun TV |
| 2000–2001 | Matti Manishi | | Telugu | Doordarshan |
| 2001-2002 | Kelunga Mamiyare Neengalum Marumagal Than | Rajeshwari | Tamil | Sun TV |
| 2001–2003 | Pavithrabandham | Sasirekha | Telugu | Gemini TV |
| 2002–2003 | Eenati Ramayanam | | Telugu | Gemini TV |
| 2005–2006 | Selvi | Thangam | Tamil | Sun TV |
| 2006–2012 | Kasthuri | Radha | Tamil | Sun TV |
| 2007-2009 | Arasi | Thangam | Tamil | Sun TV |
| 2010–2012 | No: 23 Mahalakshmi Nivasam | Rajeshwari | Telugu | Gemini TV |
| 2016–2019 | Valli | Rajeshwari | Tamil | Sun TV |
| 2019 | Chandrakumari | | Tamil | Sun TV |
| 2019–2020 | Siva Manasula Sakthi | Rajalakshmi | Tamil | Star Vijay |
| 2019–2020 | Sundari Neeyum Sundaran Naanum | Vijayalakshmi | Tamil | Star Vijay |
| 2019–2020; 2021 | Roja | Canada Kamakshi | Tamil | Sun TV |
| 2020–2023 | Abhiyum Naanum | Rajeshwari | Tamil | Sun TV |
| 2021–2022 | Vaidhegi Kaathirundhaal | Amuthanayaki | Tamil | Star Vijay |
| 2023–2024 | Mr. Manaivi | Maragatham | Tamil | Sun TV |

=== Shows ===
| Year | Title | Role | Language | Channel |
|---|---|---|---|---|
| 2020 | Vanakkam Tamizha | Guest | Tamil | Sun TV |
| 2020 | Vanakkam Tamizha | Guest | Tamil | Sun TV |
| 2020 | Yarappa Inda Ponu | Herself | Tamil | Sun TV |
| 2021 | Mathappu Sondhangal | Herself | Tamil | Sun TV |
| 2022 | Puthandu Saval | Herself | Tamil | Sun TV |
