= Sirithu Vazha Vendum =

1974 film by S. S. Balan

- Theatrical release poster
- Directed by: S. S. Balan
- Screenplay by: S. S. Balan
- Based on: Zanjeer by Salim–Javed
- Produced by: S. Maniyan; Vidwan V. Lakshmanan
- Starring: M. G. Ramachandran; Latha; M. N. Nambiar
- Cinematography: A. Shammugham
- Edited by: M. Umanath
- Music by: M. S. Viswanathan
- Production company: Udhayam Productions
- Release date: 30 November 1974
- Running time: 146 minutes
- Country: India
- Language: Tamil

Siritthu Vazha Vendum (pronounced [siɾittu ʋaːɻa ʋeːɳɖum] transl. Live cheerfully) is a 1974 Indian Tamil-language action film written and directed by S. S. Balan. The film stars M. G. Ramachandran, Latha and M. N. Nambiar. It is based on the 1967 Italian film Death Rides a Horse and 1973 Hindi film Zanjeer. The film was released on 30 November 1974, and ran for over 100 days in theatres.

== Plot ==
During his childhood, Ramu escapes death during the massacre of his parents. He grows up, haunted by the memory of this horrible night, drawing indefatigably a white horse, resulting from the chain bracelet of the mysterious killer. He also turns into a fearless and death-defying cop with an insatiable urge to get vengeance.

Later, he finds the murderer some years later on his policeman's way with the help of Usthad Abdul Rahman, an ex-owner of a cabaret who once was Ramu's enemy but now has sworn to give his life for Ramu after an initial fight, and settles the score with him.

== Cast ==
- M. G. Ramachandran as Inspector Ramu and Usthad Abdul Rahman
- Latha as Mala
- M. N. Nambiar as Nakanraj
- R. S. Manohar as Othai Kannu
- Thengai Srinivasan as "Kedhy" Pakiri
- L. Kanchana (also Junior Kanchana) as Nakanraj's mistress
- V. S. Raghavan as De Selva
- V. Gopalakrishnan as The superior of Ramu
- Isari Velan as a bad guy
- V. R. Thilakam as Janaki, Ramu's mother
- S. V. Ramdas as Dayalu
- Peeli Sivam as Vigilance officer
- T. K. S. Natarajan as Tailor
- Selvaraj as Vasthath / Rogue
- Karikol Raju as Gambler
- Pandu as Cheater in gambling
- Pasi Narayanan as Drama organizer
- Trichy Soundararajan as Marimuthu, Ramu's father
- S. R. Veeraraghavan as a police officer, Ramu's foster father
- Tarunraj as young Ramu

== Production ==
The film was launched at Gemini Studios. Ki. Va. Jagannathan lit the lamp while L. V. Prasad switched on the camera. The song "Konja Neram Ennai" was picturised on that day.

== Soundtrack ==
The soundtrack was composed by M. S. Viswanathan. The song "Konja Neram" is set in Saranga raga.

Track listing
| No. | Title | Lyrics | Singer(s) | Length |
|---|---|---|---|---|
| 1. | "Ondre Solvaan (Ennathil Nalamirunthel)" | Pulamaipithan | T. M. Soundararajan, chorus | 5:13 |
| 2. | "Nee Ennai Vittu" | Pulamaipithan | L. R. Eswari | 3:45 |
| 3. | "Konja Neram Ennai" | Vaali | T. M. Soundararajan, S. Janaki | 5:25 |
| 4. | "Ponmana Chemmalai" | Vaali | T. M. Soundararajan, Vani Jairam | 2:59 |
| 5. | "Ulagam Ennum" | Pulamaipithan | T. M. Soundararajan, P. Susheela, Sheikh Salamad | 5:09 |
| Total length: | | | | 22:31 |

== Reception ==
Kanthan of Kalki said the film, despite its title, had nothing to make audiences cheerful. Navamani praised the acting, music, art, dialogues and direction.
