= Vayasu Ponnu =

1978 film directed by K. Shankar

- Theatrical release poster
- Directed by: K. Shankar
- Screenplay by: R. K. Shanmugham
- Based on: Love Birds by Manian
- Produced by: K. N. Kunjappan
- Starring: R. Muthuraman; Jai Ganesh; Latha; Roja Ramani
- Cinematography: Rajaram
- Edited by: K. Shankar
- Music by: M. S. Viswanathan
- Production company: RGM Productions
- Release date: 2 September 1978
- Running time: 146 minutes
- Country: India
- Language: Tamil

Vayasu Ponnu (transl. Adolescent girl) is a 1978 Indian Tamil-language film directed and edited by K. Shankar, and written by R. K. Shanmugham. It is based on Love Birds, a novel by Manian serialised in Ananda Vikatan. The film stars R. Muthuraman, Jai Ganesh, Latha, and Roja Ramani. It was released on 2 September 1978, and failed commercially.

== Plot ==
The heroine is brought up by her elder sister but gets attracted to hippie culture. Her elder sister's friend gives her a mini skirt and revealing top and she starts to get stalked. She is saved by a rich, kind and middle-aged man whose only vice is call girls. She leaves his house and job though he has been decent and kind to her. She rejects the proposal of her new house owner who is a devout Murugan devotee and moves on. She gets gang raped one night and her life is in shambles. The kind man, her elder sister, hippie friend and the devotee back her up unquestioningly with the devotee wanting to marry her. He gets killed in a brawl while she is in altar. She gets her elder sister and hippie friend married and goes to live off with the kind man in an unnamed relationship which is hinted to be platonic.

== Cast ==
- R. Muthuraman
- Jai Ganesh
- Latha
- Roja Ramani
- M. N. Nambiar
- Thengai Srinivasan
- V. S. Raghavan
- Rajasulochana
- M. N. Rajam
- A. Sakunthala

== Production ==
Vayasu Ponnu was directed and edited by K. Shankar. It was produced by K. N. Kunjappan under R. G. M. Productions. The screenplay was written by R. K. Shanmugham, based on Love Birds, a novel by Manian serialised in Ananda Vikatan. The film was prominently shot in Delhi and Agra, across monuments including the Taj Mahal, India Gate, Birla Mandir and Qutb Minar.

== Soundtrack ==
The soundtrack was composed by M. S. Viswanathan. The song "Kaanchi Pattuduththi" is set in the Carnatic raga known as Kalyanavasantam.

Track listing
No.	Title	Lyrics	Singer(s)	Length
1.	"Kaanji Pattudutti"	Muthulingam	K. J. Yesudas, Savithri
2.	"Matthalattha"	Vaali	S. P. Balasubrahmanyam
3.	"Mein Hoon Lucky"	Vaali	Vani Jairam
4.	"Adho Oru"	Muthulingam	T. M. Soundararajan, Vani Jairam

== Release and reception ==
Vayasu Ponnu was released on 2 September 1978, and failed commercially. However, Muthulingam won the Tamil Nadu State Film Award for Best Lyricist for "Kaanchi Pattuduththi". Anna praised Shanmugam's dialogues, Shankar's direction, Viswanathan's music and performances of cast.
