= Madhuraiyai Meetta Sundharapandiyan =

1978 film by M. G. Ramachandran

- Theatrical release poster
- Directed by: M. G. Ramachandran
- Screenplay by: P. Neelakantan
- Based on: Kayalvizhi by Akilan
- Produced by: Sokkaiah; Subramani Iyer
- Starring: M. G. Ramachandran; M. N. Nambiar; P. S. Veerappa; Latha; Padmapriya
- Cinematography: M. Karnan; A. Shanmugan; Ramasamy Sekar
- Edited by: Sundaram
- Music by: M. S. Viswanathan
- Production company: Soleswar Combines
- Release date: 14 January 1978
- Country: India
- Language: Tamil

Madhuraiyai Meetta Sundharapandiyan (transl. The king who redeemed Madurai) is a 1978 Indian Tamil-language historical action film, directed by M. G. Ramachandran, starring himself, M. N. Nambiar, P. S. Veerappa, Latha and Padmapriya. Based on the novel Kayalvizhi by Akilan, it was Ramachandran's final full-fledged film. (Note: Two separate films Avasara Police 100 (1990) and Nallathai Naadu Kekum (1991) used substantial footage of Ramachandran's shelved films. Madhuraiyai Meetta Sundharapandiyan was Ramachandran's final release completed with his full involvement.) The film was released on 14 January 1978 and became a box-office bomb, but Latha won the Tamil Nadu State Film Award for Best Actress.

== Plot ==
The story narrates the tale of a brave Pandiya prince named Sundharapandhiyan who redeems the kingdom of Madurai from the hands of a Chola king. Under the identity of an itinerant poet, Paintamizh Kumaran, he is going to fire the consciousness of the people with his words and reunite them in his cause, which is the defence of freedom and rights. He unites the people and then engages in war with the emperor sending him reeling back and liberating Madurai reestablishing Pandiya empire.

== Cast ==
- M. G. Ramachandran as Paintamizh Kumaran alias Sundharapandiyan
- Latha as Kayalvizhi
- Padmapriya as Princess Bhamini
- M. N. Nambiar as Prince Raja Rajan
- P. S. Veerappa as The Minister Thaigum Valavarai
- K. Kannan as The King Narasihma
- S. V. Subbaiah as The King Chozhan
- S. V. Sahasranamam as The King Kulasegara Pandiyan
- Shanmugasundaram as Son of Minister
- V. S. Raghavan as The Minister
- Thengai Srinivasan as Vilava, The Prince Sundharapandhiyan's spy
- Isari Velan as Naghavana
- Mustapha
- Ennatha Kannaiya as Salabu
- T. K. S. Natarajan as Iyer
- Trichy Sounderarjan as Kingdom's doctor

== Production ==
Madhuraiyai Meetta Sundharapandiyan is based on the novel Kayalvizhi by Akilan, serialised in the magazine Kalki. The film began production in April 1974 at Sathya Studios, with B. R. Panthulu as director and producer; however, following his death, lead actor M. G. Ramachandran took over directing while Sokkaiah and Subramani Iyer of Soleswar Combines took over production. The film was shot in Jaipur, Delhi and Mysore. It was Ramachandran's final full-fledged film, as he had to retire from films to serve as the Chief Minister of Tamil Nadu. Although work was yet to be completed when he became Chief Minister, he received 10 days permission from the then Governor of Tamil Nadu to complete the film.

== Soundtrack ==
The soundtrack was composed by M. S. Viswanathan. The song "Amutha Thamizhil" is set in Dwijavanthi, a Carnatic raga, and "Thendralil Aadidum" is set in the Shuddha Saveri raga.

Track listing
No.	Title	Lyrics	Singer(s)	Length
1.	"Mangalyam"	Muthulingam	Vani Jairam	3:26
2.	"Veera Magan Poraada"	Muthulingam	T. M. Soundararajan, P. Susheela	3:41
3.	"Thayagathin Sudhanthiramae"	Muthulingam	T. M. Soundararajan	3:53
4.	"Amutha Tamizhil"	Pulamaipithan	Jayachandran, Vani Jairam	3:48
5.	"Thendralil Aadidum"	Pulamaipithan	K. J. Yesudas, Vani Jairam	4:43
Total length:				19:31

== Release and reception ==
Madhuraiyai Meetta Sundharapandiyan was released on 14 January 1978. Ananda Vikatan rated the film 50 1/2 out of 100. The film became a box-office bomb, with many people attributing it to the poor timing of release. Latha won the Tamil Nadu State Film Award for Best Actress, creating a major upset as people expected either Sridevi (for 16 Vayathinile) or Lakshmi (for Sila Nerangalil Sila Manithargal) to win.

== Bibliography ==
- Sundararaman (2007) [2005]. Raga Chintamani: A Guide to Carnatic Ragas Through Tamil Film Music (2nd ed.). Pichhamal Chintamani. OCLC 295034757.
