= Raman Parasuraman =

- Directed by: M. S. Gopinath
- Written by: M. S. Gopinath; Thooyavan (dialogues)
- Produced by: B. Bhuvaneswari
- Starring: Sivakumar; Latha; Rathi; Sathyaraj
- Cinematography: S. S. Lal
- Edited by: K. Baburao
- Music by: Satyam
- Production company: Suresh Fine Arts
- Release date: 19 September 1980
- Country: India
- Language: Tamil

Raman Parasuraman is a 1980 Indian Tamil-language film, directed by M. S. Gopinath. The film stars Sivakumar, Latha, Rathi, Sathyaraj and Pandari Bai. It was released on 19 September 1980. The film was a remake of director's own Telugu film Ramudu Parasuramudu.

== Plot ==
Three antique statue smugglers kill a husband and wife and leave their two sons as orphans. The two brothers get separated. While the elder named Parasuraman grows as an outlaw with a strong urge to take revenge on the three who killed his parents, the younger named Ram becomes a doctor. Parasuraman goes in search of those three overseas and kills all of them. The brothers ultimately reunite.

== Cast ==
- Sivakumar as Ram and Parasuraman
- Latha
- Rathi
- Major Sundarrajan
- Thyagarajan
- Sathyaraj
- Pandari Bai
- P. R. Varalakshmi
- Jayamalini
- A. R. Srinivasan

== Production ==
Raman Parasuraman was filmed in Singapore, Japan, Hong Kong and Thailand. A. R. Srinivasan accepted to play one of the three antagonists after the original actor backed out despite the film being nearly complete.

== Soundtrack ==
The songs were composed by Satyam, with lyrics by Vaali.

Track listing
No.	Title	Singer(s)	Length
1.	"Kalyana Malai kondadum"	S. P. Balasubrahmanyam, P. Susheela	4:07
2.	"Paaramma Paaru"	S. P. Balasubrahmanyam, S. Janaki	4:37
Total length:			8:44

== Reception ==
Kalki appreciated the film's music, cinematography and lack of comedy.
