= Netru Indru Naalai (1974 film) =

- Theatrical release poster
- Directed by: P. Neelakantan
- Written by: Sornam (dialogues)
- Story by: Nellai Venkatachalam
- Produced by: S. A. Ashokan
- Starring: M. G. Ramachandran; Manjula; Latha
- Cinematography: A. Shanmugham; Amirtham
- Edited by: R. Sebastian
- Music by: M. S. Viswanathan
- Production company: Amalraj Films
- Release date: 12 July 1974
- Running time: 154 minutes
- Country: India
- Language: Tamil

Netru Indru Naalai (transl. Yesterday, Today, Tomorrow) is a 1974 Indian Tamil-language film directed by P. Neelakantan. The film stars M. G. Ramachandran ,Manjula and Latha. It was released on 12 July 1974, and ran for 150 days in theatres.

== Plot ==
Two swindlers, Nallasivam and Dayalan, kill Kanaga, the wife of a wealthy industrialist Manavalan Thangappapuram. The baby who was with the mother escapes from their claws by the intervention of a farmer, who raises the child as his own, naming him Manickam. Meanwhile, both criminals see Thangappapuram, with another baby in his arms, and persuade the widower that they saved him. Wild with joy by thinking that he has found his newborn child, Rathnam, Thangappapuram does not know that a terrible trap has just closed in on him. Indeed, this fake Rathnam allows both men, Nalasivam and Dayalan to steal some money from Manavalan Thangappapuram. But Manickam finds that he is the real son of Thangappapuram and knows that his father is in a terrible trap. Manickam tries to prove that he is the real Rathnam, but Thangappapuram does not believe him. How Manickam makes his father believe him and save him from the fake Rathnam, Nalasivam, and Dayalan – is the plot of the story.

== Cast ==
- M. G. Ramachandran as Manickam (the East Africa doctor) and Kumar
- Manjula as Annam, Manickam's lover
- Latha as Sumathi, an actress
- M. N. Nambiar as Rathnam (the false)
- S. A. Ashokan as "Perum Puli" Jambhu, a rowdy
- Rajasree as Amutha, Kumar's lover
- M. G. Chakrapani as Manavalan Thangappapuram, Manickam (Kumar's) father
- Pandari Bai as Kanaga, Manavalan Thangappapuram's wife
- V. K. Ramasamy as Nallasivam
- Thengai Srinivasan as Dayalan
- Sukumari as Dayalan's wife
- V. Gopalakrishnan as Manickam's (Kumar's) foster father
- Isari Velan as Reporter
- Thilakam as Nallasivam's wife
- Gandhimathi as doctor who takes charge of Amutha
- Rama Prabha as Muniyamma, "Perum Puli" Jambhu's niece
- Peeli Sivam
- Ennatha Kannaiya as Drama Artist
- Karikol Raju as Drama Arranger
- Sathya as Slum Resident
- K. K. Soundar as Slum Resident
- T. K. S. Natarajan as Slum Resident
- Selvaraj as Slum Resident
- Baby Indira as Nallasivam's child (second daughter)

== Production ==
This film was produced by the actor S. A. Ashokan under his banner, Amalraj Films.

== Soundtrack ==
All song were composed by M. S. Viswanathan, except "Nerungi Nerungi Pazhagum Pothu..." which was composed by K. V. Mahadevan. The song "Paadum Podhu Naan" is set in Mohanam raga.

Song	Singers	Lyrics	Length
"Paadum Pothu Naan"	S. P. Balasubrahmanyam	Pulamaipithan	03:18
"Naan Padichen" (Thambi)	T. M. Soundararajan	Vaali	06:04
"Nee Ennenna"	T. M. Soundararajan, P. Susheela	Pulamaipithan	04:02
"Innoru Vaanam" (Romeo)	T. M. Soundararajan, P. Susheela	Kannadasan	03:46
"Nerungi Nerungi"	T. M. Soundararajan, P. Susheela	Suratha	03:18
"Ange Varuvadhu"	S. P. Balasubrahmanyam, S. Janaki	Avinasi Mani	03:20

== Release and reception ==
Netru Indru Naalai was released on 12 July 1974. Kanthan of Kalki appreciated the film for Shanmugham and Amirtham's cinematography, as well as Ramachandran's flawless youthful looks and stunts despite his advanced age.
