= Peeli Sivam =

Indian actor

Kalaimamani Peeli Sivam
- Born: P. L. Sivanappan; 5 July 1938; Pudupeerkadavu, Coimbatore District, Madras Presidency, British India (now in Erode district, Tamil Nadu, India)
- Died: 25 September 2017 (aged 79); Vellore, Tamil Nadu, India
- Occupations: Film actor, Television actor and stage actor
- Years active: 1958–2017
- Awards: Kalaimamani Award (1994)

P.L. Sivanappan known by his stage name credited as Peeli Sivam (5 July 1938 – 25 September 2017) was an Indian actor who featured around 400 Tamil-language films and plays from 1958 to 2017. He has featured in several films such as Muhammad bin Tughluq (1971) Malligai Poo (1973), Doorathu Idi Muzhakkam (1980), Poi Saatchi (1982),Mundhanai Mudichu (1983), Imaigal (1983), Azhagan (1991), Ejamaan (1993), Vetri Vinayagar (1996) and many more. He has also acted in television shows. In 1995, he was conferred the Kalaimamani award from the state of Tamil Nadu for his contributions in the field of drama.

== Early life ==
Born in a small hamlet, Pudupeerkadavu, near Bannari – Erode District, Tamil Nadu, Sivanappan had a passion for acting in his childhood days which later grew to the extent when he was brought to the limelight of stage plays by none other than Puratchi Thalaivar M.G.Ramachandran to pursue his career in stage plays and later on carried on to silver screen and small screen. He has co-starred in films with likes of film legends MGR and Sivaji Ganesan. Peeli Sivam belongs to the generation of actors who hailed from the Tamil theater. He has acted in many stage plays.

== Career ==
He had pursued acting as his profession and was into stage plays with his affiliation to stage troupes like National Theatres (R.S.Manohar), Seva Stage (S.V.Sahasaranamam), Manoramma troupe (Manoramma), Stage Friends (Komal Swaminathan) until mid 1970s. Later he switched his professional career to Silver screen and Small Screen and actively continued his profession until 2012.

=== Films ===
He has appeared in over 200 films as a supporting actor, villain character roles. He has played lead role in Thoorathhu Idi Muzhakkam alongside Vijayakanth and performed key roles in Cho's Tughlaq and K.Bhagyaraj's Poi Saatchi, Mundhanai Mudichu. He had been acting on numerous Tamil serials and sops. He has also acted in many films with Captain Vijayakanth like Captain Prabakaran, Nenjile Thunivirunthaal, Periya Marudhu, including the latter's debut directorial venture Virudhagiri.

=== Television ===
Peeli Sivam ventured into small screen space and acted in many Doordarshan plays earlier and later in TV serials, Idhu Oru Kadhal Kathai (2005). He was also cast on STAR Vijay's drama soap, Kana Kaanum Kaalangal (2006). His TV career hit a new limelight with his character as Annanchi in AVM's Vaazhkai and later Periyappa in Vikatan Televistas's Thirumathi Selvam. He portrayed the role of Annamalai in the Tamil soap opera, Uravugal (2009), which was aired on Sun TV.

== Awards ==
- 1994: Received title of Kalaimamani Award by the Government of Tamil Nadu, which is the highest state honour in the field of Arts.
- 2009: Received Tamil Nadu Government Lifetime Achievement Award.
- Awarded the title Kalai Selvam.

== Death ==
Peeli Sivam died at the Hospital of Christian Medical College Vellore on 25 September 2017, at the age of 79 due to his age related ailments.

== Filmography ==
This is a partial filmography. You can expand it.

Films

=== 1970s ===
Year	Film	Role	Notes
1970	Ethiroli	Doctor	Debut movie
1971	Muhammad bin Tughluq	Ibn Battuta/Raghavan	
1973	Malligai Poo		
1973	Deivamsam	Union Leader	
1974	Netru Indru Naalai		
1974	Sirithu Vazha Vendum	Vigilance officer	
1975	Ninaithadhai Mudippavan	Police senior officer	
1975	Idhayakkani		
1975	Eduppar Kai Pillai		
1975	Naalai Namathe		
1976	Needhikku Thalaivanangu		
1976	Thunive Thunai	Station master	
1976	Mogam Muppadhu Varusham	Vimala's Husband	
1976	Kumara Vijayam		
1977	Navarathinam		
1977	Indru Pol Endrum Vaazhga		
1977	Sri Krishna Leela		
1978	Shankar Salim Simon	Razak Bhai	
1978	Iraivan Kodutha Varam	Gopal	
1979	Veettukku Veedu Vasappadi		

=== 1980s ===
Year	Film	Role	Notes
1980	Doorathu Idi Muzhakkam	Maari	
1980	Rishi Moolam		
1981	Anichamalar		
1981	Nenjile Thunivirunthal		
1981	Karaiyellam Shenbagapoo	Police Inspector	
1982	Hitler Umanath		
1982	Poi Satchi	Murugappan	
1983	Mundhanai Mudichu	Doctor	
1983	Imaigal		
1983	Samayapurathale Satchi		
1984	Naan Mahaan Alla	Gopinath	
1984	Nandri		
1984	Ninaivugal		
1985	Pillai Nila		
1985	Sri Raghavendrar		
1986	Muthal Vasantham		
1987	Per Sollum Pillai	Manager	
1987	Chinna Kuyil Paaduthu		
1988	Paarthal Pasu		
1988	Oorai Therinjikitten	Muthu	
1989	Manasukketha Maharasa		

=== 1990s ===
Year	Film	Role	Notes
1990	Pulan Visaranai	Sivaguru	
1990	Oru Puthiya Kathai		
1991	Captain Prabhakaran	Raja	
1991	Azhagan		
1992	Singaravelan	Inspector	
1992	Nadodi Pattukkaran		
1992	Ellaichami		
1993	Idhaya Nayagan		
1993	Thanga Pappa	Lawyer	
1993	Yajaman		
1993	Rajadurai		
1994	Sindhu Nathi Poo		
1994	Ilaignar Ani		
1994	Veeramani		
1994	Periya Marudhu	Police Inspector	
1995	Karuppu Nila		
1995	Gandhi Pirantha Mann		
1996	Vetri Vinayagar	Lord Indran/Devendran	
1996	Aavathum Pennale Azhivathum Pennale	Police inspector	
1996	Thayagam	Sakthivel's father	
1997	Abhimanyu		
1997	Ganga Gowri		
1997	Pasamulla Pandiyare		
1999	Dhinamum Ennai Gavani		
1999	Mugam		

=== 2000s ===
Year	Film	Role	Notes
2000	Vallarasu	Police Commissioner	
2002	Ezhumalai	Lakshmi and Sandhya's father	
2003	Anjaneya	Education officer	
2004	Gambeeram		
2006	Dharmapuri	School teacher	
2008	Ezhuthiyatharadi	Devi's father	

=== 2010s ===
Year	Film	Role	Notes
2010	Virudhagiri	Virudhagiri's father	Last Movie

== Television ==
- Aachi International (1997-1998)
- Oru Pennin Kadhai (1998-2000)
- Vaazhkai (2000-2001) as Annachi
- Vazhndu kattukiren (2001-2002)
- Aasai (2002-2003) as Aasha's father
- Sorgam (2003-2006) as James Thangaraj
- Idhu Oru Kadhal Kadhai (2005)
- Kana Kaanum Kaalangal (2006-2009)
- Paasam (2007-2008)
- Thirumathi Selvam (2007-2010) as Narayanan (Periyavar)
- Comedy Colony (2009) as Jayashree's Father
- Sollathan Ninaikiren (2009-2010)
- Uravugal (2009) as Annamalai
- Thayumanavan (2013-2014)
- Mohini (2014-2015)
