= Ethiroli =

1970 film by K. Balachander

- Poster
- Directed by: K. Balachander
- Screenplay by: K. Balachander
- Story by: K. V. R. Acharya
- Produced by: G. N. Velumani
- Starring: Sivaji Ganesan; K. R. Vijaya
- Cinematography: N. Balakrishnan
- Edited by: N. R. Kittu
- Music by: K. V. Mahadevan
- Production company: Navarathna Films
- Release date: 27 June 1970
- Running time: 166 minutes
- Country: India
- Language: Tamil

Ethiroli (pronounced [eðiroli] transl. Echo) is a 1970 Indian Tamil-language legal drama film, directed by K. Balachander. The film stars Sivaji Ganesan and K. R. Vijaya. It was released on 27 June 1970.

== Plot ==
The story revolves around Advocate Shankar, who gives his daughter seven principles to follow. However, in a critical case that he takes up, Shankar ends up violating each principle, leading to misery in both his case and personal life. The film concludes with his daughter gifting him the same seven principles, which he intends to follow once again.

== Cast ==
- Sivaji Ganesan as Advocate Shankar
- K. R. Vijaya as Vijaya
- S. S. Rajendran as Raju
- Jyothi Lakshmi as Shanti
- Sivakumar as Sundaram
- Lakshmi as Kalpana
- Major Sundarrajan as Manickam
- V. S. Raghavan as Public Prosecutor
- T. S. Balaiah as Singapur Minor Balaiya
- Nagesh as Krishna Rao
- G. Sakunthala as Radhamani
- Roja Ramani as Raji
- O. A. K. Thevar as Thevar
- Vijaya Lalitha as Valli
- Peeli Sivam as Doctor
- S. R. Prabhakar as Chittor

== Production ==
Edhiroli was the first and only collaboration between Balachander and Ganesan. This was Balachander's first collaboration with Sivakumar.

== Themes ==
Ethiroli revolves around the "moral decay of men".

== Soundtrack ==
The music was composed by K. V. Mahadevan, with lyrics by Vaali.

Song	Singers	Length
"Kalyanam Kalyanam"	A. L. Raghavan, L. R. Eswari	04:04
"Kunguma Chimizh"	T. M. Soundararajan, L. R. Eswari	04:10
"Maraththa Vachavan"	L. R. Eswari	03:22
"Rajavum Vanthituvar"	L. R. Eswari	02:58
"Unga Nalla Manasukku"	L. R. Eswari	03:54

== Release and reception ==
Ethiroli was released on 27 June 1970. The Indian Express wrote, "this is quite a different movie. It makes a fairly successful and quite an interesting study of blackmailer and the blackmailed".
