= A. K. Veerasamy =

Indian actor

- Born: Veerasamy; Aalakudi, Thanjavur District
- Died: 22 August 2010; Chennai, Tamil Nadu
- Occupation: Actor
- Years active: 1959-2004
- Spouse: Rajalakshmi
- Children: 5

A. K. Veerasamy was an Indian actor who acted in over 500 films in the Tamil language, in supporting and minor roles. He is remembered for one verse that he spoke of in the Mudhal Mariyadhai film, "Enakku Oru Unmai Therinchavunum". Veerasamy was the vice president of the South Indian Actors' Association.

== Early career ==
He acted in plays with Sivaji Ganesan. His dialogue "Enaku oru unmai therinjaaganum" (I need to know the truth) from the film Mudhal Mariyadhai became popular. He acted in Gemini Ganesan's Unnaipol Oruvan.

== Personal life ==
His wife's name is Rajalakshmi. The couple has 4 sons and one daughter.

== Death ==
He died on 22 August 2010 at the age of 84 following an age-related illness.

== Filmography ==
This is a partial filmography. You can expand it.

=== 1950s ===
Year	Film	Role	Notes
1959	Naalu Veli Nilam		

=== 1960s ===
Year	Film	Role	Notes
1963	Neengatha Ninaivu		
1963	Karpagam	Villager	
1964	Kathalikka Neramillai	Ashok's father	
1964	Panakkara Kudumbam	Muthaiya's father in law	
1964	Bommai		
1965	Ennathan Mudivu		
1965	Panam Padaithavan	Masilamani, Shanti's father	
1966	Chitthi	Advocate	
1966	Madras To Pondicherry		
1966	Chinnanchiru Ulagam		
1966	Selvam		
1967	Kan Kanda Deivam		
1967	Soappu Seeppu Kannadi		
1968	Poovum Pottum		
1968	Nimirndhu Nill		
1969	Vaa Raja Vaa		
1969	Kula Vilakku		
1969	Nirai Kudam	Madhanagopal Ungel	

=== 1970s ===
Year	Film	Role	Notes
1970	Kalam Vellum		
1970	Thirumalai Thenkumari		
1970	Paadhukaappu		
1971	Kulama Gunama		
1971	Soodhattam		
1971	Aathi Parasakthi		
1971	Mohammed Bin Tughluq		
1971	Kankaatchi		
1972	Mappillai Azhaippu		
1972	Agathiyar		
1972	Shakthi Leelai		
1972	Kurathi Magan		
1973	Deivamsam		
1973	Ponnunjal		
1973	Maru Piravi		
1973	Nalla Mudivu		
1974	Kulagowravam		
1974	Thaai Paasam		
1976	Dasavathaaram		
1977	Nandha En Nila		
1978	Ilamai Oonjal Aadukirathu		
1979	Gnana Kuzhandhai		
1979	Mambazhathu Vandu		

=== 1980s ===
Year	Film	Role	Notes
1980	Karaiyai Thodatha Alaigal		
1980	Doorathu Idi Muzhakkam		
1981	Lorry Driver Rajakannu		
1981	Thanneer Thanneer		
1982	Sangili		
1985	Muthal Mariyathai	Sengodan	
1987	Ore Ratham		
1987	Mangai Oru Gangai		

=== 1990s ===
Year	Film	Role	Notes
1990	Palaivana Paravaigal		

=== 2000s ===
Year	Film	Role	Notes
2004	Kamaraj		
2004	Vasool Raja MBBS	Hospital Cleaner	
2008	Vallamai Tharayo		Last Movie
