= Ninaithadhai Mudippavan =

- Poster
- Directed by: P. Neelakantan
- Screenplay by: R. K. Shanmugam
- Story by: Jeevanprabha M. Desai
- Produced by: Sarojini Chandrakumar
- Starring: M. G. Ramachandran; Latha; M. N. Nambiar; Manjula; Sharada
- Cinematography: V. Ramamoorthy; A. Shanmugam
- Edited by: M. Umanath
- Music by: M. S. Viswanathan
- Production company: Oriental Films
- Release date: 9 May 1975
- Running time: 152 minutes
- Country: India
- Language: Tamil

Ninaithadhai Mudippavan (transl. Accomplishes all his Goals) is a 1975 Indian Tamil-language action drama film, starring M. G. Ramachandran in dual roles, Latha, Manjula, M. N. Nambiar and Sharada in supporting roles. It is a remake of the 1970 Hindi film Sachaa Jhutha, which itself is a remake of the Uttam Kumar starrer Bengali film Tasher Ghar (1957). The film was released on 9 May 1975 and became a blockbuster.

== Plot ==
Sundaram is an innocent band musician who lives with his physically challenged sister Sita in a village. He needs more money for his sister's marriage and he sets off to Madras to earn. On the other hand, Madras city Police department is shocked by a series of diamond thefts. But Inspector Mohan suspects the thief to be Ranjith Kumar, who is actually a wealthy diamond businessman on the account that whenever a theft occurs, he is present there. But he has no evidence and searches for it. He creates a plan with Leela, a policewoman, to attract Ranjith to know his secret plans. Sundaram arrives in the city and goes to a party hall. Ranjith, who arrives at the party is surprised to see Sundaram as he looks identical to him. He immediately makes a plan. He takes Sundaram to his place and reveals himself. He convinces Sundaram to act like Ranjith in front of society as he is a heart patient and requires a treatment. Until his return from treatment, Sundaram has to make believe to everybody that he is Ranjith. Actually, he makes him as Ranjith so that he can continue with his diamond smuggling; meanwhile, there will not be any evidence as Sundaram is going to be Ranjith everywhere. But he did not reveal the reason to him. He also promises that he would give money for his sister's marriage. Innocent Sundaram believes him and agrees to the plan.

Ranjith's girlfriend Mohana trains Sundaram to be like Ranjith and he acts like him. Sundaram finally learns every mannerism of Ranjith and at an instance he behaves like Ranjith to Ranjith. He acts as Ranjith in the city and real Ranjith continues his underground work. Inspector Mohan cannot come to a conclusion. Leela moves intimately with Sundaram thinking of him as Ranjith, but Sundaram falls in love with her. In the village, due to heavy floods, Sita loses everything and comes in search of her brother to Madras with her dog Mothy. Mohana meets Sita and helps her to reach the place. In one situation, Mohan saves her from them and takes her to his home. Mohana, who follows Sita to Mohan's house, informs Ranjith about her. Ranjith, posing like her brother, goes to Mohan's home and takes her with him.

Sundaram finds Ranjith is actually a thief and plans a grand diamond loot. Sundaram resists the plan, but Ranjith blackmails him with his sister. Unwillingly, he accepts the plan. Ranjith steals a huge amount of diamonds, but Sundaram replaces him by attacking him and leaves the place. One of the stolen diamond pieces has a transmitter and police follow the jewels with the help of it. Sita is confused as to who is her brother among them. After several fights, both Sundaram and Ranjith are arrested. Both of them claim to be Sundaram and confuse everyone. Many tests to find who is real Ranjith fail. Confused by this, the court is helpless to find out who is the real Ranjith. Suddenly a body of a dead woman enters the court. Ranjith finds that the woman is his mother (Gandhimathi). Unable to resist his feelings he screams at his mother and cries on her body. Court finally concludes who is Ranjith. But Ranjith's mother is not dead, but pretended to be, to find out who is her son. Ranjith is arrested and sent to prison. He apologizes to Sundaram and promises Mohana that he will marry her after he got out from prison. Sita finally marries Inspector Mohan.

== Cast ==
- M. G. Ramachandran as Sundaram, a musician and Ranjith, a billionaire
- Manjula as Leela, Sundaram's lover and undercover cop
- Latha as Mohana, Ranjith's lover and secretary
- Sharada as Seetha, Sundaram's sister
- M. N. Nambiar as Mohan, a police officer
- S. A. Ashokan as Jagadish, a police officer
- Thengai Srinivasan as Kandaswamy, the peddler
- Peeli Sivam as The police senior officer
- S. V. Ramadass as Ranjith's hired man
- V. S. Raghavan as Ranjith's father (Guest Appearance)
- Poornam Viswanathan as The judge (Guest Appearance)
- V. Gopalakrishnan as The doctor (Guest Appearance)
- Sundari Bai as Sundaram and Sita's aunt
- S. N. Lakshmi as Mohan's mother
- Karikol Raju as Seetha's groom's father
- Selvaraj as Postman
- V. R. Thilakam as The defense counsel
- Gandhimathi as Ranjith's mother
- Leela as Lalitha, a police officer
- Rexy (Dog) as Moti, Sundaram's dog
- Rangammal (uncredited role)

== Soundtrack ==
The music was composed by M. S. Viswanathan. The songs "Poomazhai Thoovi", "Kannai Nambathey" and "Oruvar Meethu" became chartbusters. The song "Kannai Nambathey" was remixed by G. V. Prakash Kumar in Enakku Innoru Per Irukku (2016).

Track listing
No.	Title	Lyrics	Singer(s)	Length
1.	"Poomazhai Thoovi Vasanthangal" (short version)	Pulamaipithan	T. M. Soundararajan	2:19
2.	"Kannai Nambaathey"	A. Maruthakasi	T. M. Soundararajan	4:33
3.	"Kollaiyittavan Neethaan"	Pulamaipithan	P. Susheela & Vani Jairam	5:11
4.	"Poomazhai Thoovi Vasanthangal" (long version)	Pulamaipithan	T. M. Soundararajan	4:29
5.	"Oruvar Meethu"	Vaali	T. M. Soundararajan & P. Susheela	5:17
6.	"Thaane Thaane Thanthaanath thaanaa"	Kannadasan	T. M. Soundararajan	3:28
7.	"Poomazhai Thoovi Vasanthangal" (short version)	Pulamaipithan	T. M. Soundararajan	0:41
8.	"Nee Thottu Pesinaal" (not in the film, not held)	Avinashi Mani	P. Susheela	3:12
Total length:				29:10

== Reception ==
Kanthan of Kalki praised Sharada's performance citing her acting stays in our mind till the end while also praising the dual roles of Ramachandran and his stunt scenes and also praised the film's cinematography. He concluded the review saying it is like a bittersweet mix when you think that this film, which speaks of Vaathiyar's (Ramachandran's nickname) greatness, turned out to be a Tamil adaptation of the Hindi film Sacha Jhutha, couldn't they get a similar plot in Tamil ?.
