= Devi Dharisanam =

- Directed by: K. Shankar
- Screenplay by: K. Shankar
- Story by: S. Jagadeesan
- Produced by: T. A. K. Chari
- Starring: K. R. Vijaya; Latha; Sarath Babu; S. V. Subbaiah
- Cinematography: Kanchi Meenatchisundaram
- Edited by: K. Shankar; K. R. Krishnan
- Music by: M. S. Viswanathan
- Production company: Malar Combines
- Release date: 9 January 1981
- Running time: 135 minutes
- Country: India
- Language: Tamil

Devi Dharisanam is a 1981 Indian Tamil-language film, directed by K. Shankar and produced by T. A. K. Chari. The film stars K. R. Vijaya, Latha, Sarath Babu and S. V. Subbaiah. It was released on 9 January 1981.

== Cast ==
- K. R. Vijaya
- Latha
- Manju Bhargavi in guest appearance
- Sarath Babu
- S. V. Subbaiah
- S. A. Ashokan
- Thengai Srinivasan
- V. S. Raghavan
- S. V. Ramadoss
- V. Gopalakrishnan
- Nalinikanth
- Goundamani
- Rajagopal
- I. S. R.
- Gopu
- Chandran Babu
- Thangaraj
- T. K. S. Natarajan
- Dhandapani
- Balaji
- Sarathkumar
- Uthirapathi
- Uthayanan
- Narasimhan
- Sukumari
- Thambaram Lalitha
- Baby Babitha
- Baby Jaishanthi

== Production ==
In order to make the film "a lavish affair", director K. Shankar cast K. R. Vijaya, Latha, Sripriya and Sridevi.

== Soundtrack ==
The music was composed by M. S. Viswanathan.

Track listing
No.	Title	Lyrics	Singer(s)	Length
1.	"Aalayam Endral"	Kannadasan	Sirkazhi Govindarajan & chorus
2.	"Sakthi Illamal"	Kannadasan	P. Jayachandran, T. M. Soundararajan
3.	"Naan Thaandi"	Udayanan	P. Susheela, Renuka
4.	"Amudha Thirumugathil"	Kannadasan	Vani Jairam
