= Mayor Meenakshi =

1976 film by Madurai Thirumaran

- Theatrical release poster
- Directed by: Madurai Thirumaran
- Screenplay by: Madurai Thirumaran
- Story by: Suki Subramaniam
- Starring: Jaishankar; K. R. Vijaya
- Cinematography: Ramachandran
- Edited by: S. P. S. Veerappa
- Music by: M. S. Viswanathan
- Production company: Ashok Brothers
- Release date: 28 May 1976
- Running time: 155 minutes
- Country: India
- Language: Tamil

Mayor Meenakshi is a 1976 Indian Tamil-language drama film, written and directed by Madurai Thirumaran, from a story by Suki Subramaniam and the music was by M. S. Viswanathan. It stars K. R. Vijaya playing the title role, with Jaishankar, V. K. Ramasamy and Cho in key roles. The film was released on 28 May 1976.

== Plot ==
The film revolves around Meenakshi, who rises from an ordinary corporation scavenger to becoming mayor and the trials and tribulations she faces to maintain a balance at work and at home.

== Cast ==
- Jaishankar
- K. R. Vijaya as Meenakshi
- V. K. Ramasamy
- Cho
- Manohar
- T. K. Bhagavathi
- Thengai Srinivasan
- Suruli Rajan
- V. S. Raghavan
- K. Kannan
- R. V. Udayar
- A. Veerasamy
- Shanmugam
- Typist Gopu
- Rowdy Rathinam
- T. K. S. Natarajan
- Subburaman
- M. N. Rajam
- Manorama
- Baby Rohini
- Vijayakumar (guest appearance)
- Sripriya (guest appearance)

== Production ==
According to historian Vamanan, Mayor Meenakshi established K. R. Vijaya as the "ideal mother figure", prior to which she appeared mainly in "family-centric films". Some scenes were shot at Kashmir.

== Soundtrack ==
Music was by M. S. Viswanathan.

Song	Lyricist	Singer	Length
"Evalo Oru Pennam Aval Naan"		P. Susheela	04:28
"Thirumurugan Aruginile Valli Kurathi"		P. Jayachandran, Vani Jairam	04:40
"Kodi Vitta Siru Mullai Malare"		Vani Jairam	04:00
"Kanden Kalyana Penn Pondra"		S. P. Balasubrahmanyam, P. Susheela	04:45
"Irundha Nalla Iru Ini"		Vani Jairam, M. S. Viswanathan	04:03

== Release and reception ==
Mayor Meenakshi was released on 28 May 1976. Kanthan of Kalki in his review felt that the screenplay and script was weak. Naagai Dharuman of Navamani praised the acting, music, cinematography and dialogues. Free India appreciated the film for the cast performances, primarily Vijaya.
