= Doorathu Idi Muzhakkam =

1980 film by K. Vijayan

- Title card
- Directed by: K. Vijayan
- Written by: T. Somasoodan
- Produced by: K. Vijayan
- Starring: Poornima; Vijayakanth
- Cinematography: N. Balakrishnan
- Edited by: B. Kandasamy
- Music by: Salil Chowdhury
- Production company: Saisudha Films
- Release date: 5 December 1980
- Running time: 125 minutes
- Country: India
- Language: Tamil

Doorathu Idi Muzhakkam (pronounced [ðuːɾatu iɖi muɻakkam] transl. Distant thunder) is a 1980 Indian Tamil-language drama film produced and directed by K. Vijayan and written by T. Somasoodan. Starring debutante Poornima and Vijayakanth, it has Peeli Sivam, and A. K. Veerasamy in other prominent roles. Set in the backdrop of a fishing community, the film tells the story of a woman who is torn between her love and husband. The film was screened at the Indian Panorama of the International Film Festival of India in 1981.

== Plot ==
A group of students visit a fishing village and see the statue of a young lady holding a shell and a lamp in both her hands. A tourist guide narrates the story as the film goes into a flashback mode.

Perumooppan, the village head, finds a child abandoned in a boat in the sea. He takes the child with him and brings him up. The child grows up into a skilled fisherman (Ponnan). Ponnan falls in love with Chelli, the daughter of a potter from the same village. Maari, Chelli's maternal uncle, who has an eye on her himself, learns about the relationship between her and Ponnan. One day when Ponnan and Chelli are together in a temple, a lamp breaks down. When Chelli is asked about her companion in the Panchayat, she fails to reveal Ponnan's name. The entire village questions her chastity and punishes her by making her swim across the sea and bring mud to light the lamp. When she does it successfully, the villagers become happy and get satisfied. This makes Maari even angrier.

On the insistence of Perumooppan, Ponnan along with a group of fishermen go to sea for fishing. During the event, Ponnan is taken away by a shark. The villagers believe that Ponnan is dead. On hearing this, Chelli attempts suicide but is saved by Maari. The villagers advise Chelli's father to have her marry Maari. Despite her reluctance, the marriage proceeds, and while returning home afterwards, she sees a dead body of a child being carried away by the villagers. Maari moves out of the house and notices a tantric (Pillikoda) who removes buried child in the graveyard and chases him. Meanwhile, Maari is appointed as one of the prominent members of the village Panchayat.

Chelli and Maari begin a happy life. By this time, the long-lost Ponnan returns to the village and finds them together. A dejected Ponnan leaves without informing her. Further, when he learns about their marriage, he decides to keep himself away from Chelli to avoid further complications. He goes to Perumooppan's house and leaves a shell that he brought from the deep sea. When Perumooppan sees this, he learns that Ponnan is still alive. In the meanwhile, Chelli delivers a baby boy. Since the baby looks dark and bears a close resemblance to Ponnan, the villagers label the child as an illegitimate one. Maari too starts believing that the child was not paid to him. A dejected Maari goes to a nearby temple during which he meets Pillikoda who asks him to bring a first male child of any family and the shell which is kept in the Pampadevi temple for exchange of some gold coins. Maari accepts the deal and takes the child and the shell and sets out to meet Pillikoda.

Meanwhile, Chelli notices her child is missing and runs to the Pampadevi temple and starts praying to the god to save her child. She then goes to Perumooppan's house to seek his help, where she finds the shell which was brought by Ponnan. Perumooppan advises her to take the surface and keep it inside the temple. He also tells Ponnan to save Chelli's child. When he is about to hand over the child to Pillikoda, Maari reforms and fights him, so Pillikoda kills him. During this time, Ponnan arrives and fights with Pillikoda and almost kills him. On the other hand, Chelli stands on the seashore and prays to the god with the shell in one hand and a lamp in another hand. When Ponnan returns to the shore with her child and Maari's corpse, Pillikoda throws a sickle and kills Ponnan. The boat arrives at the beach with the child along with the bodies of both Ponnan and Maari. Pillikoda is destroyed by a fire. Chelli becomes infuriated and asks the sea deity about the killings of her husband and Ponnan. She continues to stay on the shore. Her father erects a statue of her holding the lamp shell on both her hands at the coast.

== Cast ==
- Poornima Devi as Chelli
- Vijayakanth as Ponnan
- Peeli Sivam as Maari
- A. K. Veerasamy as Perumooppan
- A. Jagadeesan as Pillikoda
- Suruli Rajan as Neelakandam
- Karuppu Subbiah

== Production ==
The film was produced by the director Vijayan himself. The film score was provided by Salil Chowdhury while cinematography was handled by N. Balakrishnan. Poornima Devi made her debut as lead actress with this film. None of the actors applied makeup for their roles. The filming was held at Payanoor near Kerala and its surroundings. A few scenes were shot in Kerala in locations such as Ettikulam, Neeliswaram and Poochal. Although censored in December 1979, the film had a theatrical release only after a year.

== Soundtrack ==
All lyrics were written by Ku. Ma. Balasubramaniam and the music was composed by Salil Chowdhury. Since the film is primarily set in seashore, Vijayan wanted use real sounds of sea waves and Salil Chaudhary recorded the real sounds of waves.

Title	Singer(s)	Length
"Ullam Ellam Thalladuthe"	K. J. Yesudas, S. Janaki	4:27
"Sevvali Poove"	S. Janaki, chorus	4:19
"Valaiyendi Kollvom"	S. P. Balasubrahmanyam, P. Susheela	3:22
"Ullam Ellam Thalladuthe"	P. Jayachandran, S. Janaki	2:56
"Indro Manam Kalangi"	K. J. Yesudas	2:48

== Release and reception ==
Doorathu Idi Muzhakkam received positive response from the critics who appreciated the film for its realistic portrayal of a love story set in the backdrop of a fishing community. It is widely regarded as one of the new wave films that came out in the early 1980s in Tamil cinema. Nalini Shastry of Kalki felt what was there in this film to get selected for the Delhi Film Festival but praised the cinematography for capturing seashores beautifully and called the performances of cast as natural, despite feeling that the scenes of Surulirajan in flashback was unnecessary, he was natural and his presence will be missed. It was one of the 21 films to be screened at the "Indian Panorama" section of the International Film Festival of India in 1981; apart from Nizhalgal, it was the only other Tamil film to be screened at the festival that year.

== Bibliography ==
- Dhananjayan, G. (2014). Pride of Tamil Cinema: 1931–2013. Blue Ocean Publishers. OCLC 898765509.
- Rajadhyaksha, Ashish; Willemen, Paul (1998) [1994]. Encyclopaedia of Indian Cinema. British Film Institute and Oxford University Press. ISBN 0-19-563579-5.
