= Rishi Moolam =

1980 film by S. P. Muthuraman

- Theatrical release poster
- Directed by: S. P. Muthuraman
- Written by: Mahendran
- Based on: Rishi Moolam (play) by Mahendran
- Produced by: S. S. Karuppasamy; S. S. K. Sannasi; S. S. K. Sakaralingam; S. S. K. Ganesan; S. S. K. Murugan
- Starring: Sivaji Ganesan; K. R. Vijaya
- Cinematography: Babu
- Edited by: R. Vittal
- Music by: Ilaiyaraaja
- Production company: S. S. K. Films
- Release date: 26 January 1980
- Country: India
- Language: Tamil

Rishi Moolam (transl. The Origins of a Sage) is a 1980 Indian Tamil-language film, directed by S. P. Muthuraman and written by Mahendran. The film stars Sivaji Ganesan and K. R. Vijaya. It is based on Mahendran's play of the same name. The film was released on 26 January 1980.

== Plot ==
SP Santhosh IPS has a past life. He hides that from his wife Gokila. Gokila loves her husband Santhosh and her son Ashok but at the same time she has a policy that she will forgive anything but not the liar.

At one point, upon learning that her husband Santhosh was a petty thief, she confronts him and leaves him and their son. She moves into her father's home, who is a Justice and applies for divorce in court but the judgement is given in favor of Santhosh.

Though Santhosh wins the case but he still feels guilty and resigns from his SP job. Also he talk to Gokila and tell her that he will give her the divorce and leaves her with his son.

He finds a new job as a tea estate supervisor. He meets Thangam and request her to be the caretaker for his son. When he realises that the caretaker fall in love on him, Santhosh talked to her and get her married to a labor in his tea estate.

Meanwhile Gokila realises her mistake through her childhood teacher and in search of her husband and her son.

Time flies by and his son Ashok grows and become a champion in Tennis. Ashok has another name Amarnath and become a famous Tennis player. While hearing this Gokila and her father feels very happy. Kokila's father goes to meet Amarnath. Gokila too wishes to meet them. But the situations were not allowing her to meet him.

In the end, while observing that Amarnath aka Ashok hates her mother, now Santhosh and his friends play a drama and finally the entire family reunited.

== Cast ==
- Sivaji Ganesan as SP Santhosh IPS
- K. R. Vijaya as Kokila
- Major Sundarrajan Kokila's father and Lawyer
- Suruli Rajan as Neelakandam
- Thengai Srinivasan Younger brother of Lawyer
- Y. G. Mahendran
- Chakravarthy as Ashok/Amarnath
- Reena in guest appearance
- Manorama Neelakandan's wife
- Leela
- K. Vijayan
- V. S. Raghavan in guest appearance
- Peeli Sivam a bad police officer
- Krishnan
- Manavalan
- Vairam Krishnamoorthy
- Baby Preetha (debut) Baby Ashok

== Production ==
Rishimoolam was based on the stage play of the same name. Mahendran who wrote the script of the play also wrote the screenplay for the film adaptation. The film was originally titled Dhisaigal Thirumbum. It was Muthuraman's third collaboration with Ganesan. The song "Aimbadhilum Aasai Varum" was shot in Kallikottai, Kerala.

== Soundtrack ==
The music was composed by Ilaiyaraaja, with lyrics by Kannadasan. The song "Neramithu" was composed at a hotel in Mamallapuram.

Song	Singers	Length
"Neramithu"	P. Susheela, T. M. Soundararajan	04:34
"Vaada En"	S. P. Sailaja	04:20
"Mazhai Varuvathu"	S. Janaki	04:39
"Aymbathilum"	T. M. Soundararajan	04:37
"Nenjil Ulla"	Jayachandran	04:21
"Maamanukku"	S. Janaki	04:36

== Reception ==
P. S. M. of Kalki wrote that, rather than delving deep about the weak plot, the film can be watched for the performances of Ganesan and Vijaya.

== Bibliography ==
- Mahendran (2013) [2004]. சினிமாவும் நானும் [Cinema and I] (in Tamil). Karpagam Publications. OCLC 54777094.
