= Dasavatharam (film) =

- Poster
- Directed by: K. S. Gopalakrishnan
- Written by: K. S. Gopalakrishnan
- Starring: Ravikumar
- Cinematography: P. Ramasamy
- Edited by: R. Devarajan
- Music by: S. Rajeswara Rao
- Production company: Brilliant Picture Co-Operation
- Release date: 15 January 1976
- Running time: 179 minutes
- Country: India
- Language: Tamil

Dasavatharam (transl. The Ten Avatars) is a 1976 Indian Tamil-language Hindu mythological film, directed and written by K. S. Gopalakrishnan. The film, based on the Dashavatara (ten Avatars) of Vishnu, features an ensemble cast, including Ravikumar as Vishnu. It was released on 15 January 1976.

== Plot ==
Dasavatharam tells the "Ten Avatars", a spell–binding story about how far you can get with Lord Vishnu's grace. The Ten avatars named are as follows: Matsya (The Fish), Kurma (The Tortoise), Varaha (The Boar), Narasimha (The halfman/half lion), Vamana (a Dwarf), Parashurama (Warrior with the Axe), Rama (Prince of Ayodhya), Krishna (Prince of Mathura), Balarama (Avatar of Adhisheshan) and Kalki (Eternity).

== Cast ==
- Gemini Ganesan as Arjuna
- M. R. Radha as Hiranyakashipu
- Sirkazhi Govindarajan as Narada
- M. R. R. Vasu as Hayagriva
- V. K. Ramasamy as Ilangeswaran's minister
- V. S. Raghavan as Guru Sukracharya
- Major Sundarrajan as Dasharatha
- S. V. Sahasranamam as Mahabali
- Thengai Srinivasan as Jamadagni
- S. A. Ashokan as King Ilangeswaran or Ravanan
- P. S. Veerappa as Dushasana
- S. V. Ramadas as Duryodhana
- Shanmugasundaram as Prince Namachi
- Master Sridhar as Prince Lakshmana
- Master Sekhar as Prince Bharatha
- V. Gopalakrishnan as Lord Brahma
- Y. G. Mahendran as a Tribe
- Ravikumar as Vishnu
- Udaiyappa as Shiva
- Kaka Radhakrishnan as Sukracharya's assistant
- Veerasamy as Durvasa
- Master Raghuraman as Vamana
- K. R. Vijaya as Yasodhai
- Sowcar Janaki as Kayadhu
- Jayachitra as Mahalakshmi
- Sripriya as Shurpanakha
- Jaya as Princess Draupadi/Panchaali
- Vijayakumari as Kaikeyi
- Sridevi as Sita
- S. Varalakshmi as Adhiparasakthi, Lalita Tripurasundari, Mahakali, Meenakshi,
- P. R. Varalakshmi as Parvati, Kali
- Udaya Chandrika as Mahasaraswati
- V. R. Thilagam as Renuka Devi
- Baby Rani as Prahalad

== Soundtrack ==
Music was by S. Rajeswara Rao and lyrics were written by Udumalai Narayana Kavi, A. Maruthakasi and Vaali.

| Song | Singers | Length |
|---|---|---|
| "Santhakaram Pujakasayanam" | Sirkazhi Govindarajan | 02:02 |
| "Om Ennum Manthirathin" | P. Susheela | 04:38 |
| "Hari Narayana" | Sirkazhi Govindarajan | 02:32 |
| "Narayana Ennum Naamam" | Sirkazhi Govindarajan | 06:47 |
| "Hari Narayana Ennum Naamam" – (F) | T. K. Kala | 02:23 |
| "Iranyaya Namaga" | Y. G. Mahendran T. K. Kala | 02:55 |
| "Thaniyaayo Sinam" | T. K. Kala | 01:45 |
| "Keral Music" | Instrumental | |
| "Moovadi Mann Kettu" | Sirkazhi Govindarajan | |
| "Thaayinum Paaramal" | Sirkazhi Govindarajan | |
| "Thandhai Soll Mikka" | Sirkazhi Govindarajan, Vani Jairam | |
| "Ambai Eduthaan" | Sirkazhi Govindarajan, Vani Jairam, K. J. Yesudas | 10:01 |
| "Adhu Mutriya Kaliyin Avatharam" | T. L. Maharajan | 05:21 |

== Reception ==
Kanthan of Kalki called Seerkazhi Govindarajan as a main hero of the film for making audience understand about ten incarnations while also praising the actors, cinematography and graphics but felt the film was lengthy due to too many songs and lengthy dialogues which affected the film's pace.
