= Suprabatham =

- Theatrical release poster
- Directed by: K. Shankar
- Screenplay by: Mathi Oli Shanmugam
- Story by: S. Jagadeesan
- Produced by: P. V. Thulasiram
- Starring: See below
- Cinematography: D. V. Rajaram
- Music by: M. S. Viswanathan
- Production company: P. V. T. Productions
- Release date: 14 April 1979
- Country: India
- Language: Tamil

Suprabatham (transl. Auspicious morning) is a 1979 Indian Tamil-language devotional film directed by K. Shankar and co-written by S. Jagadeesan. The film stars an ensemble cast including S. A. Ashokan, Jai Ganesh, Latha, R. Muthuraman, M. N. Nambiar, Sarath Babu, Sorna, P. S. Veerappa, K. R. Vijaya and C. R. Vijayakumari. It was released on 14 April 1979.

== Cast ==
Sorted alphabetically according to last/given name, excluding initials

- S. A. Ashokan
- Jai Ganesh
- Latha
- R. S. Manohar
- R. Muthuraman
- M. N. Nambiar
- Sarath Babu
- Sorna
- Sripriya
- P. S. Veerappa
- K. R. Vijaya
- C. R. Vijayakumari

== Production ==
S. Jagadeesan, who wrote the film's story, also wrote the dialogues while Mathi Oli Shanmugam wrote the screenplay. Jagadeesan said the crew took a bus from Delhi to travel to Badrinath, they encountered problems such as crew members including cooks falling sick due to climate change, the film's cast themselves had to cook the food. The next day, the scenes with Latha, Nambiar and Vijayakumari were filmed at Lakshman Jhula near river Ganges. The crew then went to Devprayag where mountain path fell down and took hours to get it sorted and they reached Srinagar. While travelling through Joshimath, they had to escape through stones thrown on roads and they reached Badrinath. In Badrinath, the bus stuck on the hills escaped accident, the crew had to walk six kilometers to Badrinath and shot many scenes there on temples and hills. The filming was also held at locations such as Kathmandu, Haridwar, Kasi, Mathura, Dwaraka, Pandaripuram and Tirupathi for fifteen days.

== Soundtrack ==
The music was composed by M. S. Viswanathan, with lyrics by Kannadasan.

Track listing
No.	Title	Singer(s)	Length
1.	"Kannanai Ninaithaal"	K. J. Yesudas, Vani Jairam
2.	"Unmai Therinthipirukkum"	Vani Jairam
3.	"Adi Radha Sri Krishnan"	Vani Jairam
4.	"Thirukkoyil"	Sirkazhi Govindarajan, Vani Jairam
5.	"Unnaithaan"	T. M. Soundararajan, P. Susheela

== Release and reception ==
Suprabatham was released on 14 April 1979. Naagai Dharuman of Anna and Kanthan of Kalki wrote positive reviews praising K. Shankar for directing a devotional film without adding unnecessary commercial ingredients while also praising the acting, music, locations and the film's message.
