= Needhikku Thalaivanangu =

1976 film by P. Neelakantan

- Theatrical release poster
- Directed by: P. Neelakantan
- Story by: M. Balayya
- Produced by: M. Subbramaniyam
- Dialogue by: R. K. Shanmugam
- Starring: M. G. Ramachandran; Latha
- Cinematography: Thambu
- Edited by: M. Umanath
- Music by: M. S. Viswanathan
- Production company: Sri Umayambikai Productions
- Distributed by: S. R. V. Films
- Release date: 18 March 1976
- Running time: 164 minutes
- Country: India
- Language: Tamil

Needhikku Thalaivanangu (transl. Bow your Head for Justice) is a 1976 Indian Tamil-language film directed by P. Neelakantan, starring M. G. Ramachandran and Latha. It is a remake of the Telugu film Neramu Siksha (1973). The film was released on 18 March 1976 and became a box office success.

== Plot ==
Vijay, who lives with his uber rich parents with a pampering mother and a disappointed father, leaves home one day as his father insults him after he finds out that he, through accident during his passion for racing, has caused the death of one and blinding of another poor man. With his conscience pricking, he flees his home, to right the wrongs before surrendering for his mistakes in front of the law unaware that his mother has already found Gopal to take the blame in return for money for his sister's marriage.

He comes across a girl, Nirmala and saves her from rapists whom he adopts as his sister unaware that she is Gopal's sister, and begins work on improving her life. Desperate to find a job, he joins as waiter to Vajravel and his daughter Vimala. Meanwhile, Sathiyamoorthy, Vijay's friend who really caused the accident and blamed it on Vijay, joins Vajravel and tries to impress Vimala. He also gets money from Vijay's mother telling her he knows where Vijay is and Vijay needs money. Vijay and Vimala fall in love but Vijay is quits the job for fear of exposure to his father.

On the other side, the family ruined by the accident has a widow, Seetha, her son and her blind brother-in-law Chinnaiya whose only motive is revenge. Vijay spends most of his earnings to help this family while the other half to support his new sister. He also plans to get Chinnaiya married to Nirmala which progress slowly. Vijay's relationship with Seetha is mischaracterised by society forcing him to don the getup of crazy beggar to help them which he uses to thrash those who mischaracterised the relationship with impunity. With Vijay's help Chinnaiya gets his vision thanks to money earned by Vijay in bike race and takes the sickle to kill Gopal who tells him that it was Vijay who did it. When looking for Vijay, they all realise that Vijay was the butler who Vimala is in love with, the beggar who helped them later, the man who helped them initially, the man who saved Nirmala among other things; they forgive him. He goes to the court who releases him as there cannot two punishment for single crime.

== Cast ==
- M. G. Ramachandran as Vijay
- Latha as Vimala
- S. Varalakshmi as Maragadham
- Pushpalatha as Seetha
- Roja Ramani as Nirmala alias Eswari
- M. N. Nambiar as Sathiyamoorthy
- V. K. Ramasamy as Vajaravel
- Thengai Srinivasan as Muthaiya
- V. S. Raghavan as Rajasekaran
- V. Gopalakrishnan as Gopal
- M. Balayya as Chinnaiya
- S. V. Ramadas as the rapist at the hotel
- Isari Velan as Mani, the cook
- Peeli Sivam as Slum people
- Ennathe Kannaiah as Rent Collector
- Loose Mohan as Muthaiya's sidekick
- T. K. S. Natarajan as Pimp
- Rangammal - uncredited role

== Production ==
A remake of the Telugu film Neramu Siksha (1973), Needhikku Thalaivanangu was directed by P. Neelakantan and produced by Sri Umayambikai Productions. Cinematography was handled by Thambu, and editing by M. Umanath. The costumes were designed by M. G. Naidu, the founder of Naihaa. The film was launched at Gemini Studios in 6 December 1973 under the title Yaaraiyum Azha Vaikkathe. During the filming of a sequence, Latha tripped and nearly drowned, resulting in M. G. Ramachandran reprimanding stuntman Sahul. According to Neelakantan, the climax where Ramachandran saves Latha from the cliff was shot at three different locations: Shivanasamudra Falls, Hogenakkal and Balmuri Falls, all these were chosen by Ramachandran himself as he previously shot Chakravarthi Thirumagal (1957) in them. The said climax which lasts for two minutes took two days to be completed while it took six days for the crew to figure out how to film this scene and make the safety preparations.

== Soundtrack ==
The music was composed by M. S. Viswanathan. Na. Kamarasan made his debut as lyricist with this film after Ramachandran was impressed with his poems. The songs like "Intha Pachaikili" were well received.

Track listing
No.	Title	Lyrics	Singer(s)	Length
1.	"Intha Pachchai Kilikkoru" (female)	Pulamaipithan	S. Varalakshmi	1:48
2.	"Eththanai Manitharkal"	Na. Kamarasan	P. Jayachandran	3:34
3.	"Intha Pachchai Kilikkoru" (male)	Pulamaipithan	K. J. Yesudas	4:22
4.	"Paarkka Paarkka Sirippu"	Vaali	T. M. Soundararajan, P. Susheela	4:15
5.	"Naan Paarththa"	Pulamaipithan	T. M. Soundararajan	6:18
6.	"Kanavukale Aayiram"	Na. Kamarasan	T. M. Soundararajan, P. Susheela	4:06
Total length:				24:23

== Release and reception ==
Needhikku Thalaivanangu was released on 18 March 1976, by S. R. V. Films. Kanthan of Kalki praised the cast performances, and cinematography and called R. K. Shanmugam's dialogues as thought provoking and concluded the review saying totally it is Ramachandran's trademark. Naagai Dharuman of Navamani praised the acting, dialogues, music and direction. The film became a box office success and ran for over 100 days in theatres.
