= Azhagan =

1991 Indian drama film

- Poster
- Directed by: K. Balachander
- Written by: K. Balachander
- Produced by: Kovai Chezhiyan
- Starring: Mammootty; Bhanupriya; Geetha; Madhoo; Babloo Prithiveeraj
- Cinematography: R. Raghunatha Reddy
- Edited by: Ganesh–Kumar
- Music by: Maragathamani
- Production company: K. C. Film Combines
- Release date: 25 August 1991
- Country: India
- Language: Tamil

Azhagan (transl. Handsome) is a 1991 Indian Tamil-language drama film directed by K. Balachander and produced by Kovai Chezhiyan. It stars Mammootty in the lead role with an ensemble supporting cast, including Bhanupriya, Geetha, Madhoo (in her Tamil debut), and Babloo Prithiveeraj. The film, released on 25 August 1991, was critically and commercially successful.

== Plot ==
Azhagappan is a widowed, successful hotelier and the father of four small children. He presides over a performance by dancer Priya Ranjan, which is attended by a Swapna (a young college student) and Kanmani (a tutorial college teacher). All three women fall in love with Azhagappan. Swapna tries to get close with Azhagappan by befriending his kids. Azhagappan happens to enroll into Kanmani's tutorial college and she gets close with him as well. But Azhagappan really likes Priya and gets close with her.

Swapna declares her love for Azhagappan but refuses citing their age difference. Kanmani meets a similar fate albeit on different grounds. Both women successfully persuade Priya into believing Azhagappan is a philanderer and they both separate. Swapna uses Azhagappan's kids and tries to pressurize him to marry her. The kids go to extreme measures, which forces Azhagappan's car driver Santhanam into blurting out a surprising truth about the children. Swapna understands Azhagappan's situation and drops her attempts to marry him.

Kanmani, Swapna, and the four children get together and devise a plan and successfully unite Azhagappan and Priya.

== Cast ==
- Mammootty as Azhagappan
- Bhanupriya as Priya Ranjan
- Geetha as Kanmani
- Madhoo as Swapna
- Babloo Prithiveeraj as Kumaresan Azhagappan's servant
- Sowcar Janaki as Doctor Janaki
- K. S. Jayalakshmi as Swapna's teacher
- Sujitha as Baby (Azhagappan's daughter)
- Robert as Anand (Azhagappan's son)
- Vikranth as Azhagappan's son
- Rajesh Kumar as Durai (Azhagappan's son)
- Charle as Television Anchor
- Peeli Sivam as Inspector Selvaraj
- Suresh Chakravarthi as Agarapattanam Sokku
- Sonia as Kanmani's sister
- Kavithalaya Krishnan as Doctor
- R. Sundaramoorthy as Manoharan
- Yuvarani as Swapna's college Friend
- Gowtham Sundararajan as dancer in song "Kozhi Koovum"
- Ramya Krishnan in cameo appearance
- Veera Raghavan as Priya Ranjan's Father
- "Saathappan" Nandhakumar as Auditorium ticket checker

== Production ==
Madhoo, the niece of actress Hema Malini, made her acting debut with this film. The song "Kozhi Koovum" was choreographed by Kala and was picturised within two days.

== Soundtrack ==
Azhagan (Original Motion Picture Soundtrack)

Soundtrack album by Maragathamani
- Released: August 25,1991
- Length: 29:13
- Label: Studio Plus Entertainment

The music was scored by Maragathamani. The song "Thathithom" is set in Dharmavati raga, "Sangeetha Swarangal" is set in Kharaharapriya, and "Jaadhi Malli" is set in Maand. The last portions of the song "Thathithom" were inspired from "Liberian Girl" by Michael Jackson.

All lyrics are written by Pulamaipithan.

Track listing
No.	Title	Singer(s)	Length
1.	"Avan Thaan Azhagan"	Minmini	2:24
2.	"Kozhi Koovum Neram"	Malaysia Vasudevan, K. S. Chithra, Sirkazhi G. Sivachidambaram	5:02
3.	"Thudikirathe Nenjam"	K. S. Chithra, S. P. Balasubrahmanyam	4:07
4.	"Thathithom"	K. S. Chithra	5:11
5.	"Sangeetha Swarangal"	S. P. Balasubrahmanyam, Sandhya	3:14
6.	"Sathi Malli Poocharame"	S. P. Balasubrahmanyam	4:14
7.	"Mazhaiyum Neeye"	S. P. Balasubrahmanyam	2:24
8.	"Nenjamadi Nenjam"	S. P. Balasubrahmanyam, K. S. Chithra	2:37
Total length:			29:13

== Reception ==
The Indian Express wrote, "Balachander, while charting out a script bristles with very lifelike characters acting out their hopes and fears with much credibility, does not miss out on smaller details." The film was both a critical and commercial success. At the Tamil Nadu State Film Awards, Maragathamani won the award for Best Music Director, while Raghunatha Reddy won for Best Cinematographer.
