= Pancha Bhoothalu =

- LP Vinyl Records Cover
- Directed by: P. C. Reddy
- Produced by: Pitambaram
- Starring: Chandramohan
- Music by: Ilaiyaraaja
- Production company: Vijayakala Arts
- Release date: 19 February 1979
- Running time: 110 min.
- Language: Telugu

Pancha Bhoothalu is a 1979 Indian Telugu-language film directed by P. C. Reddy, starring Chandramohan.

== Cast ==
- Chandramohan
- Lata (Heroine)
- Rao Gopal Rao
- Sarath Babu

== Soundtrack ==
- Kalla lo evo evo kala le kadalade evela.(Lyricist-Dr.C.Narayana Reddy, Singers S.P.Balu and P. Susheela)
- Kavinche Kallalo (Singers SP Balu and P. Susheela)
- Malliyallo (Singers SP Balu and P. Susheela)
