= Naalai Namadhe (1975 film) =

1975 Tamil film by K. S. Sethumadhavan

- Theatrical release poster
- Directed by: K. S. Sethumadhavan
- Screenplay by: Vietnam Veedu Sundaram
- Based on: Yaadon Ki Baaraat by Salim–Javed
- Produced by: K. S. R. Moorthi
- Starring: M. G. Ramachandran; Latha; Chandramohan; Vennira Aadai Nirmala; M. N. Nambiar
- Cinematography: P. L. Roy
- Edited by: T. R. Srinivasalu
- Music by: M. S. Viswanathan
- Production company: Gajendra Films
- Release date: 4 July 1975
- Running time: 150 minutes
- Country: India
- Language: Tamil

Naalai Namadhe (transl. Tomorrow Is Ours) is a 1975 Indian Tamil-language masala film directed by K. S. Sethumadhavan. The film stars M. G. Ramachandran, Latha, Chandramohan, Vennira Aadai Nirmala, and M. N. Nambiar. A remake of the 1973 Hindi film Yaadon Ki Baaraat, it revolves around three brothers being separated in their childhood due to the actions of a killer, and growing up to live separate lives. The film was released on 4 July 1975 and became a success.

== Plot ==
Separated in their childhood by Ranjith, a killer, brothers Shankar, Vijay and Radhan grow up in different paths in life. While Shankar becomes a goon and accidentally for Ranjith, Radhan becomes a singer and Vijay a do-gooder. They have a family song which the three of them know. Fate makes them cross paths and Radhan and Vijay meet up first. Even though Shankar is there, he cannot acknowledge them for he knows his gang will kill them. How Shankar manages to get back to them without the gang catching up while Vijay with Radhan's help come up to catch the gang is the rest of the story.

== Cast ==
- M. G. Ramachandran as Shankar and Vijay
- Latha as Rani
- Chandra Mohan as Radhan
- Vennira Aadai Nirmala as Leela
- M. N. Nambiar as Ranjith
- Nagesh as Rangu alias Rathavandhu
- M. G. Chakrapani as Devdass (guest appearance)
- M. G. Soman as Ravi (guest appearance)
- Rajasree as Kamala (guest appearance)
- V. S. Raghavan as Sharma
- S. V. Ramadas as Raju
- K. Kannan as Madhan, Martin
- V. Gopalakrishnan as Robert
- Karikol Raju as Worker in bar
- Peeli Sivam as Fake doctor
- T. K. S. Natarajan as Marwadi
- Babloo Prithiveeraj as young Vijay
- Aalam as Dancer

== Production ==
Naalai Namadhe is a remake of the Hindi film Yaadon Ki Baaraat (1973). M. G. Ramachandran, in a dual role, reprised the roles originally portrayed by Dharmendra and Vijay Arora. When Ramachandran and director K. S. Sethumadhavan were discussing what to title the film, a journalist friend of theirs suggested Naalai Namadhe, and that was finalised.

== Soundtrack ==
The music was composed by M. S. Viswanathan, with lyrics by Vaali.

Song	Singers	Length
"Naalai Namathe" (Anbu Malargalai)	P. Susheela, L. R. Anjali, Shoba & Sasirekha	05:12
"Naalai Namathe" (Bit)	S. P. Balasubrahmanyam	01:37
"Naanoru Medai Paadagan"	T. M. Soundararajan, S. P. Balasubrahmanyam & L. R. Eswari	06:06
"Neela Nayanangalil"	K. J. Yesudas & P. Susheela	05:48
"Ennai Vittal"	K. J. Yesudas	04:18
"Kadhal Enbathu"	K. J. Yesudas & P. Susheela	05:12
"En Edaiyilum" (Love Is A Game)	S. P. Balasubrahmanyam, L. R. Eswari & Sai Baba	04:40
"Naalai Namathe" (Anbu Malargalai)	T. M. Soundararajan & S. P. Balasubrahmanyam	04:58
"Naalai Namathe" (Anbu Malargalai)	P. Susheela, L. R. Anjali, Shoba & Sasirekha	05:12

== Reception ==
Kanthan of Kalki called the film old-fashioned, but appreciated Sethumadhavan's direction and the colour cinematography.
