= Annadammula Anubandham =

1975 film

- Theatrical release poster
- Directed by: S. D. Lal
- Written by: Gollapudi Maruti Rao (dialogues)
- Story by: Salim–Javed
- Based on: Yaadon Ki Baaraat by Nasir Hussain
- Produced by: M. Peethambaram
- Starring: N. T. Rama Rao; Murali Mohan; Nandamuri Balakrishna; Latha
- Cinematography: Sekar-Singh
- Edited by: E. A. Dhandapani
- Music by: K. Chakravarthi
- Production company: Gajalakshmi Chitra
- Release date: 4 July 1975
- Running time: 150 minutes
- Country: India
- Language: Telugu

Annadammula Anubandham (transl. Brothers' Relationship) is 1975 Indian Telugu-language action drama film, produced by the makeup artist M. Peethambaram and directed by S. D. Lal. The film stars N. T. Rama Rao, Murali Mohan, Nandamuri Balakrishna, Latha, and music composed by Chakravarthi. It is a remake of the Hindi film Yaadon Ki Baaraat (1973). The film was a box office hit.

== Plot ==
Vijay, Anand, and Naveen are brothers. On their father Venu Gopal's birthday, their mother Lakshmi teaches them a song titled Aanaati Hrudayala, which they hold dear. Once, Venu Gopal witnesses a robbery by a masked gangster, Parasuram. To protect his identity, Parasuram slaughters Venu Gopal and Lakshmi. Vijay and Anand watch the deaths with horror. Parusuram shoots at them, and they escape with the help of the kind-hearted Parasuram's henchman, John. But they get separated, while their maternal aunt whisks Naveen.

Years roll by, and Vijay becomes a gallant on a crime spree around the city and joins an assistant, Devadas. Still, his parents' assassination haunts him. An elderly Ramaiah rears Anand, while Naveen becomes a famous pop singer who always offsets his brothers with their family songs. The Police eventually apprehended John, sentenced to 15 years. Vijay anxiously awaits his return. Soon after, he gets acquainted with John's daughter, Geeta, without knowing her identity, and both come closer. Anand's love of his life is Sunitha / Sony, daughter of a millionaire Chandra Shekar, and Naveen falls for his co-singer. The brothers meet several times yet do not recognize each other.

Once Vijay saves Anand and Sony from Parasuram's son Shekar, discerning Vijay's caliber, Parasuram appoints him as a white knight, and he courageously succeeds in their several tasks. Meanwhile, John is released, and Vijay chases him and recognizes him as their helper in childhood. Now, John conveys that the only way to find Parasuram is by wearing two shoes of different sizes, 8 and 9, respectively. John toils and uncovers Parasuram, but he slays him. Before dying, he writes a letter to Vijay regarding Parasuram's whereabouts.

Parasuram exploits Vijay to seize Sony for her father's treasure instead of the letter when Vijay seeks Sony's help and keeps her in their custody. At that point, Vijay notices Parasuram's shoes and identifies him as the murderer of his parents. At the same time, Naveen conducts his program in the hotel where Anand is also present; as usual, he calls his brothers, which Anand receives, but Vijay keeps silent as his presence may harm them. Parallelly, Vijay makes Sony accessible; a dead-heat situation occurs after that. Parasuram kidnaps Anand & Naveen for the treasure. At last, Vijay plays a trick, protects his brothers, and eliminates Parasuram. The film ends with the reunion of the brothers.

== Cast ==
- N. T. Rama Rao as Vijay
- Murali Mohan as Anand
- Nandamuri Balakrishna as Naveen
- Latha as Sunitha / Sony
- Kanchana as Geetha
- Jayamalini as Dancer
- Prabhakar Reddy as Parasuram
- Giri Babu as Sekar
- A. V. M. Rajan as Venugopal Rao
- Rajanala as Jailer
- Raja Babu as Devadas
- Raavi Kondala Rao as Manager Ramaiah
- Thyagaraju as John
- Ramadas as Ranjith
- Bhimaraju as Montin
- K. K. Sarma as Anand's friend
- Chidatala Appa Rao
- Chitti Babu
- Pushpalata as Lakshmi
- Mallikarjuna Rao
- Anitha
- Sujatha
- Aparna
- Vani

== Soundtrack ==
Music composed by Chakravarthy.

| S. No | Song title | Lyrics | Singers | length |
|---|---|---|---|---|
| 1 | "Aanaati Hrudayala" (F) | C. Narayana Reddy | P. Susheela | 4:05 |
| 2 | "Gulabi Puvvai" | Dasarathi | S. P. Balasubrahmanyam, P. Susheela | 3:24 |
| 3 | "Andamaina Pilla" | Daasarathi | S. P. Balasubrahmanyam, P. Susheela | 4:29 |
| 4 | "Aanadu Tholisari" | Daasarathi | S. P. Balasubrahmanyam, P. Susheela | 4:04 |
| 5 | "Kaugililo Vuyyala" | Daasarathi | S. P. Balasubrahmanyam, S. Janaki | 5:27 |
| 6 | "Aanaati Hrudayala" (M) | C. Narayana Reddy | S. P. Balasubrahmanyam, V. Ramakrishna | 4:14 |
