= Navarathinam =

1977 film by A. P. Nagarajan

Navarathnam
- Theatrical release poster
- Directed by: A. P. Nagarajan
- Written by: A. P. Nagarajan
- Produced by: C. N. Venkatasamy
- Starring: M. G. Ramachandran; Latha; Jayachitra; Zarina Wahab
- Cinematography: A. Shanmugam
- Edited by: T. Vijayarangam; R. G. Pandhurangam
- Music by: Kunnakudi Vaidyanathan
- Production company: C. N. V. Movies
- Release date: 5 March 1977
- Country: India
- Language: Tamil

Navarathnam (transl. Nine Gems) is a 1977 Indian Tamil-language road film, written and directed by A. P. Nagarajan, his final film. It stars M. G. Ramachandran, Latha, Jayachithra and Zarina Wahab. The film was released on 5 March 1977, and failed commercially.

== Plot ==
Thangam, lives up to his name as a gold-hearted person, leaves his house in search of a future. He meets nine different women from different statuses in life and they all fall in love with him and help him. He first meets Manikkam who is a kurathi who falls in love with him and whom he falls in love with. He then meets Pushpa who is a stage performer whom he saves but turns down her proposal and moves on. Then he meets Maragadam, Muthamma, and Gomaidi and his journey continues. He meets and reforms a prostitute Vairam. He meets a hipster Neela to whom he shows how deep and valuable the culture is. He finally meets Pavalai and Vayiduriam before marrying Manikkam in the end.

== Cast ==
Lead actor

- M. G. Ramachandran as Thangam

Lead actresses

- Latha as Manickam
- Zarina Wahab as Pushpa
- P. R. Varalakshmi as Maragadam
- Shubha as Muthamma
- Jaya as Gomaidi
- Sripriya as Vairam
- Y. Vijaya as Neela
- Jayachitra as Pavalai
- Kumari Padmini as Vayiduriyam

Supporting actresses

- S. Varalakshmi as Thangam's mother
- C. K. Saraswathi as Sagunan
- S. N. Lakshmi as Pangajethamma
- Puspalatha as Pavalai's sister

Supporting actors

- A. V. M. Rajan as Raja
- M. N. Nambiar as Dharmaseelan
- P. S. Veerappa as Manaru
- Nagesh as Rathnam
- Thengai Srinivasan as Muthamma's father
- C. R. Parthiban as IG of Police
- K. Kannan as Gunaseelan
- M. B. Shetty as Djagou
- Senthamarai as Police inspector
- Isari Velan as Pavalai's uncle
- Shanmugasundari as Thiripurasundari / Pimpstress
- Ennathe Kannaiah as Villager
- Oru Viral Krishna Rao as The worker of teashop
- Loose Mohan as House broker
- T. K. S. Natarajan as Housekeeper

== Production ==
Navarathinam was A. P. Nagarajan's final film, as well as his only film with M. G. Ramachandran. Considering the poor financial plight of Nagarajan, Ramachandran acted in the film without taking any remuneration and concentrated on minimal budget, by shooting all the scenes in his Sathya Studios, without outdoor shoots. Zarina Wahab initially suggested her friend Vijaya for one of the female lead roles, but Ramachandran refused; Wahab herself was chosen. Some scenes and climax were shot at a palace at Ooty and at locations such as Parson Valley Reservoir, Glenmorgan near Pykara Dam.

== Soundtrack ==
The music was composed by Kunnakudi Vaidyanathan. The song "Ladke Se Mili Ladki", written by Bollywood lyricist P. L. Santoshi, consists predominantly of Hindi lyrics.

| Song | Singers | Lyrics | Length |
|---|---|---|---|
| "Ladke Se Mili Ladki" (Aa Gaye Hain) (Hindi) | K. J. Yesudas & Vani Jairam | P. L. Santoshi | 4:36 (film version) |
| "Puriyaadhadhai Puriyavaikkum" | P. Susheela, (MGR for dialogues) | Na. Kamarasan | 3:01 (film version) |
| "Palukku Kanda Sa Kerugu" (Telugu, English & Carnatic) | Balamuralikrishna & Vani Jairam, (MGR & Y. Vijaya for dialogues) | Nellai Arulmani | 8:38 (film version) |
| "Ungalil Nam Annaavai Paarkiren" | S. P. Balasubrahmanyam & Vani Jairam | Pulamaipithan | 2:58 (film version) |
| "Kuruvikkaara Machchaane" | Balamuralikrishna & Vani Jairam | Vaali | 3:28 (film version) |
| "Maanum Odi Varalaam" (Not in the movie, not held) | K. J. Yesudas | Muthulingam | 3:03 (film version) |

== Release and reception ==
Navarathinam was released on 5 March 1977. Kanthan of Kalki negatively reviewed the film, criticising Nagarajan's execution of an innovative story. Ananda Vikatan called the film a "a march of nine gems", noting that though the story was subpar, there was amusement. The film failed commercially; according to historian Sachi Sri Kantha, a potential reason was that the plot was strung around "national unity" as a political propaganda for Ramachandran's newly formed party and it's then ally Indira Gandhi's Congress Party, prior to the 1977 Indian general election.
