= Ulagam Sutrum Valiban =

1973 film by M. G. Ramachandran

- Theatrical release poster
- Directed by: M. G. Ramachandran
- Story by: R. M. Veerappan; S. K. T. Sami; Ve. Lakshmanan
- Produced by: M. G. Ramachandran; R. M. Veerappan
- Starring: M. G. Ramachandran; Chandrakala; Manjula; Latha
- Cinematography: V. Ramamoorthy
- Edited by: M. Umanath
- Music by: M. S. Viswanathan
- Production company: Emgeeyaar Pictures
- Release date: 11 May 1973
- Running time: 178 minutes
- Country: India
- Language: Tamil

Ulagam Sutrum Valiban (transl. Globetrotting Youngster) is a 1973 Indian Tamil-language science fiction film directed and co-produced by M. G. Ramachandran. The film stars Ramachandran, Chandrakala, Manjula and Latha. It revolves around a scientist who discovers an energy harnessing formula, and seeks to keep his research from being abused by a rival scientist.

Ulagam Sutrum Valiban was released on 11 May 1973. It emerged as a major box office success, with a theatrical run lasting over 250 days. Ramachandran won the Filmfare Special Award for Excellent Production Values. The climax scene was shot at Expo '70.

== Plot ==
Murugan is an Indian scientist who has recently discovered how to store a part of the energy unleashed by lightning. He is assisted by Lilly who secretly spies for Bairavan. Murugan reports success of his research at a Hong Kong scientists' conference. He subsequently announces that he will not reveal his discovery, since the world is on the brink of World War III and his research may be used for destructive purposes. As scientists rebuke him Murugan decides to demonstrate. Murugan successfully demonstrates his experiment where a tree is shot down with a pill sized pellet and the surrounding is set ablaze, as a outcome of his research.

Greedy Bairavan offers $100 million and persuades him to sell the research to a foreign country(Deep State), which Murugan refuses. Despite the other scientists plea, Murugan burns the research papers in front of all scientists claiming that the research at this stage is destructive. Bairavan refuses to believe Murugan.

Murugan then departs with his girlfriend, Vimala, for a world tour. He discloses to Vimala that he only pretended to destroy the research notes, and has actually kept them in a safe place. He indeed had plans to use them, to ensure that his research was used for productive purposes. Bairavan, who has been following them, overhears this and plans to loot the research notes to sell it to deep state agents. While in Singapore, Bairavan shoots Murugan with a special gun that knocks him out. While Murugan falls from the tower Ru Yun T'a into a swimming pool, vimala faints after witnessing the act.

Sometime later, Raju, a CBCID officer and Murugan's younger brother from Tamil Nadu, India , arrives in Singapore in search of his brother. He finds Lilly who works in a club. They pair up and decide to find Murugan as his body was never recovered. On fine day, they meet a Markandeyan a waiter with kleptomania who gives clues about meeting Murugan in the hotel where he works, a few days ago. They team up and try to meet Vimala to find answers. Bairavan tricks Vimala in to believing that Raju tried to kill Murugan who is now a amnesiac. Vimala leaves with Bairavan where she finds Murugan has been taken into Bairavan's custody.

Raju, Markandeyan and Lilly get to know that research paper has been split into several parts and is in Japan with a Buddhist monk. The address to reach the monk is in Vimala's locket. Before leaving, Lilly reveals that Ratna a friend of Vimala now has the locket.

Ratna, a dancer in a hotel gets abused by her employer who forces her to striptease which she refuses. Raju fights and rescues her and pays her debts. She gets employed as his Personal secretary to repay Raju. Ratna's locket has address to reach another friend of Murugan named Robinson from Hong Kong in a time piece. Meanwhile Raju and Ratna fall in love and get married. While Bairavan's henchmen unsuccessful tries to steal the clock, Raju fends them off.

The next piece of address is with Somsoy, a fruit vendor in floating market, Bangkok,Thailand. In floating market, Raju, Markandeyan and Ratna gets chased by Bairavan's henchmen. Ratna suffers dizziness and upon doctor's insistence rests in hotel, Raju and Markandeyan finds Samsoy and his daughter Metta. Metta smitten by charms of Raju falls for him. Raju reveals he is married and consoles a disappointed Meeta that she is like a sister to him. Samsoy hands over a small statue that contains the next piece of address that directs to them to Kyoto, Japan.

Meanwhile, Bairavan attempts to assault Vimala as a shock treatment trail to . Murugan fights off Bairavan and secretly reveals to Vimala, that he is cured now. Bairavan who gets to know about the research notes, hires a martial artist to fetch it. Henchman now an imposter of Raju, learns the secret codes for the research notes are "Toshika, Kimoko, Mikayo, Nimona" but attacks and knocks down the monk. Raju arrives and find the henchman dressed up as the monk, who asks the meaning of these codes. Raju deciphers and get the case containing the research papers. Henchman attacks Raju but is unsuccessful.

Lilly escapes Vimala and Murugan from Bairavan's custody and asks them to go to "Expo 70" in Osaka. Lilly reveals that she has a crush on Raju to Vimala and wishes to marry him. Vimala unaware of Raju's marriage to her best friend Ratna, promises that she will give her life to make Raju marry Lilly. Lilly also dials Raju and says she had managed to escape Murugan and Vimala to expo but gets caught by Bairavan. They all travel to Expo. In ensuing chaos, Murugan gets caught by Bairavan and the doctor an accomplice of Bairavan tortures Murugan with a new device. However, Raju manages to save Murugan while Bairavan and the doctor kill each other in crossfire.

Finally all united, Raju is shown seemingly marrying Lilly as well. Raju, Lilly and Ratna move to East Africa on another expedition.

== Cast ==
Male cast

- M. G. Ramachandran as Murugan and Raju
- M. N. Nambiar as one of Bairavan's henchmen
- S. A. Ashokan as Bairavan
- R. S. Manohar as Lily's brother
- Nagesh as Markandeyan
- V. Gopalakrishnan as the doctor and the gunsmith of Bairavan
- Thengai Srinivasan as the driver and one of Bairavan's henchmen

Female cast

- Chandrakala as Rathnadevi
- Manjula as Vimala
- Latha as Lily
- Metta Rungrattana as Metta (guest appearance)

== Production ==
Ulagam Sutrum Valiban is the second film directed by M. G. Ramachandran, and was originally titled Mele Aagaayam Kizhe Bhoomi. It was co-produced by R. M. Veerappan. J. Jayalalithaa, in an interview with the media, said that Ramachandran owed his popularity to her; irked by this, Ramachandran fired her from Ulagam Sutrum Valiban, and replaced her with Manjula. Filming began in 1970. The climax scene was shot at Expo '70. Ramachandran's brother M. G. Chakrapani served as production consultant.

== Soundtrack ==
The soundtrack was composed by M. S. Viswanathan. The first choice of Ramachandran for the soundtrack was Kunnakudi Vaidyanathan. Two songs, "Aval Oru Navarasa" and "Nilavu Oru", were originally intended for a shelved film of Ramachandran titled Inaindha Kaigal. The song "Aval Oru Navarasa" is set in Harikambhoji raga.

Song	Singers	Lyrics	Length
"Aval Oru Navarasa"	S. P. Balasubrahmanyam	Kannadasan	03:32
"Bansaayee" (ten thousand years)	T. M. Soundararajan, L. R. Eswari	Vaali	04:44
"Lilly Malarukku"	T. M. Soundararajan, P. Susheela	Kannadasan	05:20
"Nilavu Oru"	T. M. Soundararajan	Vaali	04:22
"Oh My Darling" (In the album)	T. M. Soundararajan, P. Susheela	Vaali	04:03
"Pachchaikili"	T. M. Soundararajan, P. Susheela	Vaali	04:37
"Sirithu Vaazhavendum"	T. M. Soundararajan, chorus	Pulamaipithan	04:29
"Thangath Thoniyile"	K. J. Yesudas, P. Susheela	Vaali	03:24
"Ulagam Ulagam"	T. M. Soundararajan, S. Janaki	Kannadasan	03:39
"Namadhu Vetriyai Naalai"	Seerkazhi Govindarajan	Pulavar Vedha	02:57
"Ninaikkum Pothu" (In the album)	P. Susheela	Vaali	03:34
"Chimasa"² (Japanese song)	Female singer and male singer	Unknown	00:57
"Sayonara"² (Japanese song)	Male singer	Unknown	02:58
Instrumental piece	Chorus	No lyrics	04:46
Instrumental piece	Chorus	No lyrics	02:29
Instrumental piece	Chorus	No lyrics	

== Release and reception ==
Ulagam Sutrum Valiban was released on 11 May 1973. The film was a major commercial success, and ran for over 250 days in theatres. Ananda Vikatan wrote Ramachandran had already produced great films like Nadodi Mannan and Adimai Penn, but he surpassed them and rose to an unattainable height through this film; viewers could give as many kudos as they want to Ramachandran, who had achieved a great achievement that the Tamil film world could be proud of. In 2005, Mohanlal listed Ulagam Sutrum Valiban in his list of top ten best Indian films of all time, stating "I was a kid when I first saw this Tamil film, and I simply loved it. It has all the ingredients needed to entertain people." Navamani praised the acting, humour, cinematography, art, stunts and music and called it a must watch.

== Accolades ==
- Best Film (Sirandha Thiraipadam)
- Best Director (M. G. Ramachandran) (Sirandha Iyakkunar)
- Best Producer (M. G. Ramachandran), under his Emgiyaar Pictures Limited (Sirandha Thayaripalar)
- Filmfare Special Award for Excellent Production Values – M. G. Ramachandran

== Cancelled sequels ==
Ramachandran intended to make a sequel to this film titled Kizhakku Africavil Raju, but the project never came to fruition when he was alive. An animated sequel with the same title was planned by Ishari K. Ganesh in the late 2010s, with a new script directed by M. Arulmoorthy. Sayyeshaa and Akshara Gowda were signed on to star opposite a computer-generated Ramachandran. Despite a trailer being launched, the film did not complete production.

== Bibliography ==
- Rajadhyaksha, Ashish; Willemen, Paul (1998) [1994]. Encyclopaedia of Indian Cinema. British Film Institute and Oxford University Press. ISBN 0-19-563579-5.
