= Gnana Kuzhandhai =

- Title card
- Directed by: K. Kameshwara Rao
- Written by: Era. Pazhanisamy
- Produced by: P. L. Mohan Ram
- Starring: Gemini Ganesan; Baby Sudha; Vennira Aadai Nirmala; S. V. Subbaiah; V. S. Raghavan; Jai Ganesh
- Cinematography: M. Pasubathi; A. Varadha Rajan
- Edited by: S. A. Murugesan
- Music by: K. V. Mahadevan
- Production company: Mohan Productions
- Release date: 24 June 1979
- Running time: 153 minutes
- Country: India
- Language: Tamil

Gnana Kuzhandhai (pronounced [ɲaːnakkːuɻan̪ðaɪ] transl. Child of Wisdom) is a 1979 Indian Tamil-language Hindu mythological film, directed by K. Kameshwara Rao and written by Era. Pazhanisamy. The film stars Baby Sudha and Master Sridhar, with Gemini Ganesan Venniradai Nirmala V. S. Raghavan R. S. Manohar, S. V. Subbaiah, Jai Ganesh, Latha and K. A. Thangavelu in supporting roles. It was released on 24 June 1979.

== Cast ==
- Baby Sudha as Child Gnana Sambanthan
- Master Sridhar as Younger Thiru Gnana Sambanthar
- V. S. Raghavan as Sivapada Hrudiyar
- Gemini Ganesan as Lord Siva
- Vennira Aadai Nirmala as Goddess Parvathi
- Kallapart Natarajan as Agathiyar Munivar
- Thengai Srinivasan as Ambalavaanan
- Manorama as Alangari
- S. Rama Rao as Alangari's Brother
- Jayachitra as Princess Amudhavalli
- Heran Ramasamy as Amudhavalli Father
- Nagesh as Namachivayam, Astrologer
- Pakkoda Kadhar as Karpuram
- Sujatha as Thilagavathi
- S. V. Subbaiah as Vakeesan/Thirunavukkarasar
- R. S. Manohar as Mahendrapuri King
- Karikol Raju as Puzhalendar, Thilagavathi's father
- S. V. Sahasranamam as Sivanesan
- Tambaram Lalitha as Sivanesan's Wife
- K. A. Thangavelu as Ponni's Father
- Jai Ganesh as Moolan/thirumoolar
- Latha as Ponni
- K. Kannan as Nagan, Ponni's Cousin

== Soundtrack ==
Music was composed by K. V. Mahadevan and lyrics were written by Kannadasan, A. Maruthakasi, Alangudi Somu, Pazhanisamy and Raja Gopal.

Song	Singers	Length
"Aadum Nathane"	Sirkazhi Govindarajan	03:57
"Thodudaya Seviyan"	P. Susheela	02:23
"Osai Kodutha Nayakiyae"	P. Susheela	05:06
"Kolli Malai Kattulle"	L. R. Eswari	04:22
"Poothathu Kamalam"	Vani Jairam	04:20
"Naavale Senthamizh Naan"	T. M. Soundararajan	01:45
"Paalodu Thean Kallanthu"	T. M. Soundararajan, Vani Jairam	03:52
"Poombavai"	S. P. Balasubrahmanyam	04:32
