= T. K. S. Natarajan =

Indian actor and singer (1933–2021)

- Born: Natarajan; 23 July 1933; India
- Died: 5 May 2021 (aged 87)
- Other name: TKS
- Occupations: Actor, Folk Singer
- Years active: 1954–2006

T. K. S. Natarajan (23 July 1933 – 5 May 2021) was an Indian actor and folk singer. He debuted as a film actor in the 1954 film Ratha Paasam. He acted in more than 500 films during his career. The song 'Ennadi Muniyamma Un Kannula Mai' sung by Natarajan in the music of Shankar–Ganesh in the film 'Vanga Mappillai Vanga popularized him throughout Tamil Nadu.

== Early life ==
When Natarajan was a boy in TKS drama troupe known as TKS, he acted in many plays in TKS drama troupe. Later, Natarajan was called TKS Natarajan.

== Film career ==
T. K. S. Natarajan debuted as a film actor in the 1954 film Ratha Paasam. Since then, he has acted in more than 500 films such as Nadodi, Then Kinnam, Needhikku Thalaivanangu, Aadu Puli Attam, Mangala Vaathiyam, Ponnagaram, Pagadai Panirendu, Udaya Geetham.

== Singing career ==
'Ennadi Muniyamma Un Kannula Mai' sung by TKS Natarajan in the music of Shankar–Ganesh in the film 'Vanga Mappillai Vanga popularized him throughout Tamil Nadu. He had sung the song 'Ennadi Muniyamma' in the movie 'Vathiyar' starring actor Arjun. Its the remake of a song, the original version "Nee Munnala" from Vaanga Mappillai Vaanga of which was also sung by TKS Natarajan in 1984.

== Death ==
Natarajan died at his home in Saidapet, Chennai, at 6:30 am on 5 May 2021 at the age of 87.

== Filmography ==
=== 1950s ===
Year	Film	Role	Notes
1954	Ratha Paasam		Debut movie

=== 1960s ===
Year	Film	Role	Notes
1960	Kavalai Illaadha Manithan		
1962	Ethaiyum Thangum Ithaiyam		
1966	Nadodi		
1966	Marakka Mudiyumaa?		
1968	Kanavan	Prisoner	
1969	Athai Magal		
1969	Deivamagan		

=== 1970s ===
Year	Film	Role	Notes
1970	Maanavan	Bus passenger	
1971	Then Kinnam	Police Constable	
1971	Puguntha Veedu		
1971	Kankatchi		
1972	Itho Enthan Deivam		
1972	Annamitta Kai	Estate labor	
1972	Naan Yen Piranthen	Textile seller	
1972	Kanna Nalama		
1973	Kattila Thottila		
1973	Nalla Mudivu		
1974	Yen	Postman	
1974	Thirumangalyam		
1974	Engal Kula Deivam		
1974	Netru Indru Naalai	Slum Resident	
1974	Doctoramma		
1974	Sirithu Vazha Vendum	Tailor	
1975	Naalai Namadhe		
1975	Idhayakkani	Iyer	
1975	Cinema Paithiyam	Bhoopathy	
1975	Pallandu Vazhga	Villager	
1976	Needhikku Thalaivanangu	Pimp	
1976	Uzhaikkum Karangal		
1976	Kumara Vijayam	Police Constable	
1976	Mayor Meenakshi		
1977	Navarathinam		
1977	Indru Pol Endrum Vaazhga		
1977	Meenava Nanban	Varadhan	
1977	Kavikkuyil		
1977	Aadu Puli Attam		
1977	Thaaliyaa? Salangayya?		
1977	Palabishegham		
1977	Nallathukku Kalamillai		
1978	Ival Oru Seethai		
1978	Sadhurangam	Housekeeper	
1978	Adhirstakaran		
1978	Rudhra Thaandavam		
1979	Mangala Vaathiyam		
1979	Aarilirunthu Arubathu Varai	Seshadri	
1979	Manthoppu Kiliye	Iyer	
1979	Poonthalir		

=== 1980s ===
Year	Film	Role	Notes
1980	Ponnagaram		
1980	Guru		
1980	Devi Dharisanam		
1980	Ellam Un Kairasi		
1981	Thee		
1981	Sattam Oru Iruttarai		
1981	Meendum Kokila		
1981	Pattam Parakkattum		
1981	Thunaivi		
1981	Karaiyellam Shenbagapoo	Villu Paatu singer	
1981	Kudumbam Oru Kadambam	Petti shop owner	
1982	Pokkiri Raja	Police constable	
1982	Pagadai Panirendu		
1982	Nandri Meendum Varuga		
1982	Auto Raja		
1982	Nenjangal		
1982	Deviyin thiruvilayadal		
1982	Pattanathu Rajakkal		
1982	Anandha Ragam		
1982	Rani Theni		
1984	Thambikku Entha Ooru	beggar	
1984	Oru Kai Parpom		
1984	Puyal Kadantha Bhoomi		
1985	Mannukketha Ponnu	Patient	
1985	Udaya Geetham		
1985	Naan Sigappu Manithan	victim of robbery	
1985	Yaar?		
1986	Alai Osai		
1986	Murattu Karangal		
1986	Anandha Kanneer		
1987	Kadamai Kanniyam Kattupaadu		
1987	Jaathi Pookkal		
1988	Sathya	Nair	
1988	Namma Ooru Nayagan		
1988	Oorai Therinjikitten		
1988	Manaivi Oru Mandhiri		
1989	Varusham Padhinaaru		
1989	Thangamani Rangamani		

=== 1990s ===
Year	Film	Role	Notes
1990	Kaavalan		
1991	Naadu Adhai Naadu		
1993	Rajadhi Raja Raja Kulothunga Raja Marthanda Raja Gambeera Kathavaraya Krishna Kamarajan		
1994	Pondattiye Deivam		
1994	Nallathe Nadakkum		
1994	Ravanan		
1994	Vaanga Partner Vaanga		
1995	Karna	Pimp	
1996	Vaanmathi		
1996	Minor Mappillai		
1997	Nalla Manasukkaran		
1999	Sundari Neeyum Sundaran Naanum		

=== 2000s ===
Year	Film	Role	Notes
2006	Vathiyar	Himself	
