= Yaadon Ki Baaraat =

1973 Indian film by Nasir Hussain

- Poster
- Directed by: Nasir Hussain
- Written by: Salim–Javed; Nasir Hussain
- Produced by: Nasir Hussain
- Starring: Dharmendra; Vijay Arora; Tariq Khan; Zeenat Aman; Neetu Singh; Ajit
- Cinematography: Munir Khan
- Edited by: Babu Lavande; Gurudutt Shirali
- Music by: R. D. Burman
- Production company: Nasir Hussain Films
- Distributed by: Nasir Hussain Films; United Producers
- Release date: 1973
- Running time: 168 minutes
- Country: India
- Language: Hindi
- Box office: ₹55 million ($7.1 million)

Yaadon Ki Baaraat (transl. Procession of Memories) is a 1973 Indian Hindi-language masala film, directed by Nasir Hussain and written by Salim–Javed (Salim Khan and Javed Akhtar). It featured an ensemble cast, starring Dharmendra, Vijay Arora, Tariq Khan, Zeenat Aman, Neetu Singh, Ajit and Captain Raju. Released on November 09, 1973.

The film was influential in the history of Indian cinema. It has been widely identified as the first masala film, combining elements of the action, drama, romance, musical, crime and thriller genres. Masala films went on to become the most popular genre of Indian cinema, and Yaadon Ki Baaraat has thus been identified as "the first" quintessentially "Bollywood film." It also launched the careers of several actors, as the commercial breakthrough Hindi film for Zeenat Aman and Neetu Singh, who became leading actresses of the 1970s, and as the debut film for Nasir Hussain's nephews Tariq Khan and Aamir Khan, the latter a child actor who grew up to be one of the biggest movie stars in Hindi cinema.

It is still remembered fondly for its soundtrack, composed by music director R.D. Burman. The film was later remade in Telugu as Annadammula Anubandham, in Tamil as Naalai Namadhe and in Malayalam as Himam.

== Plot ==
=== 1958 ===
The film starts with three young brothers, Shankar, Vijay, and Ratan, celebrating their father's birthday with their mother and the maid. Their mother sings Yaadon ki Baarat a song loved by the children. When their father goes out later that evening he witnesses a theft by Shakaal and his men.

In order to remove the risk of being identified and reported to the police, Shakaal and his men break into their house and shoot the father. The mother, awakened by the noise finds her dead husband only to be shot dead too. The shocking incident is witnessed by Shankar and Vijay. They run away to the railway station. Shankar manages to catch a train and tries to take Vijay with him but they are separated. Shankar is left with no choice but to survive on the streets. He joins Usman, another boy like him, stealing food from shops.

On the police's advice the maid decides to adopt Ratan. Vijay is found unconscious by a groundskeeper of a mansion owned by a wealthy man and is raised by him.

=== 1973 ===
The brothers have grown up into mature adults. Shankar (Dharmendra), the eldest, is now joined by Usman on a crime spree around the city. However, he is still haunted by the murder of his parents and seeks to find his brothers. Vijay is now an unemployed but charming young man. Ratan, the youngest, is a singer with a band at Heavens hotel.

Vijay meets Sunita and flirts with her. But she is not responsive. At a party organised by Sunita she sings 'Chura Liya Hai'. Vijay falls in love with her. Sunita acts as if she, too, has fallen for him, but she publicly mocks him.

Vijay feigns sickness. A minidrama persuades Sunita to travel on a trip with him, a man about to lose his life to cancer. But she falls in love. Vijay, however reveals the truth to Sunita whose anger soon dissolves and he is forgiven. Ratan meanwhile also finds love with his co-dancer and singer.

The brothers meet several times but remain unaware of their close bond. But one night Ratan sings 'Yaadon ki Baarat', a heartfelt song of loss. Vijay and Shankar, present at the concert are immediately struck by a flood of memories and overjoyed. Vijay sings along with him. Vijay and Ratan unite. Shankar writes to Ratan asking him to meet him but is unable to because of his boss, none other than Shakaal.

Shankar discovers the truth of his parents' murders. He joins hands with his brothers and Sunita to make Shakaal pay for his misdeeds. Shakaal and his son Rupesh try to run away from Shankar but he corners them. Finally, Shakaal and Rupesh try to escape through the railway tracks. But Shakaal's leg gets stuck in the tracks. Shankar sees a train coming and leaves Shakaal to die, while restraining Rupesh. Shankar reunites with his brothers and their lives.

== Cast ==
- Dharmendra as Shankar
- Vijay Arora as Vijay
- Tariq Khan as Ratan / Monto
- Zeenat Aman as Sunita
- Ravindra Kapoor as Usman
- Neetu Singh as Dancer
- Ajit as Shakaal
- Imtiaz Khan as Roopesh
- Satyen Kappu as Jack
- Anamika as Jack's Daughter
- Ashoo as Mother of Shankar, Vijay, Ratan
- Nasir Khan as Father of Shankar, Vijay, Ratan
- Jalal Agha as Salim
- Master Rajesh as Young Shankar
- Master Ravi as Young Vijay
- Master Aamir as Young Ratan
- Ram Avtar as Businessman
- Moolchand as Businessman
- Jagdish Raj

== Production ==
Hussain's nephews, Tariq and Aamir, made their debuts with this film.

Tariq played one of the three male leads. Aamir, who went on to become one of the most successful actors in Hindi cinema, appeared in the title song as a child artist at the age of eight, playing the younger version of his cousin Tariq's role.

== Soundtrack ==
Yaadon Ki Baaraat

Soundtrack album by R. D. Burman
- Released: November 09, 1973
- Genre: Film soundtrack
- Label: His Master's Voice
- Producers: R. D. Burman (composer); Majrooh Sultanpuri (lyrics)

The music and soundtrack of the film was by R. D. Burman, with lyrics by Majrooh Sultanpuri. The opening lines of the song, "Chura Liyaa Hai Tumne" were inspired by the English song, "If It's Tuesday, This Must Be Belgium" by Bojoura from the soundtrack of 1969 film of the same name. The title track "Yaadon Ki Baaraat Nikli Hai" appears multiple times. Its first line has also been used in the Hindi tv series Pandian Store.

Song	Singer	Raga
"Yaadon Ki Baaraat Nikli Hai Aaj Dil Ke Dwaare" (Male)	Kishore Kumar, Mohammed Rafi	
"Yaadon Ki Baaraat Nikli Hai Aaj Dil Ke Dwaare" (Female)	Lata Mangeshkar, Padmini Kolhapure, Sushma Shrestha	
"Lekar Hum Deewana Dil, Phirte Hai Manzil Manzil"	Asha Bhosle, Kishore Kumar	
"Meri Soni, Meri Tamanna, Jhuth Nahin Hai Mera Pyar"	Asha Bhosle, Kishore Kumar	
"Aap Ke Kamre Mein Koi Rehta Hai, Hum Nahin Kehte, Zamana Kehta Hai"	Asha Bhosle, Kishore Kumar, R. D. Burman	
"Chura Liya Hai Tumne Jo Dil Ko, Nazar Nahin Churana Sanam"	Asha Bhosle, Mohammed Rafi	Pilu

== Reception ==
=== Box office ===
The film earned ₹5.5 crore at the box office, becoming the 5th highest grossing film of 1973.

== Awards ==
21st Filmfare Awards:

Nominated

- Best Actor – Dharmendra
- Best Music Director – R. D. Burman

== Impact ==
The film popularized the now-familiar Bollywood theme of separated siblings united by fate.
