= V. S. Raghavan =

Tamil actor (1925–2015)

- Born: 18 February 1925; Vembakkam, North Arcot District, Madras Presidency, British India (now in Tiruvannamalai District, Tamil Nadu, India)
- Died: 24 January 2015 (aged 89); Chennai, Tamil Nadu, India
- Occupations: Dramatist, Actor
- Years active: 1954 - 2015

V. S. Raghavan (18 February 1925 – 24 January 2015) was an Indian actor, who acted both in Tamil films as well as television. He started his career as a dramatist and stage actor and went on to act as a character actor in films, starting with Vairamali (1954) and over 1000 films in all. He also acted in numerous television series. He died on 24 January 2015.

== Early life and education ==
Born in Vembakkam village, near Singaperumal Koil near Chengleput, where he spent early part of his childhood, later for three years he lived in Mylapore neighbourhood of Chennai, and studied at the P S High School. Subsequently, he studied at St Columbus Higher Secondary School, Chengalpattu, followed by two years in Madras Christian College, Chennai. However, as he finished his school the death of his father prompted his mother to shift from native village to move to Vellala Street in Purasawalkam, Chennai where his elder sister lived.

== Career ==
V S Raghavan started his career in 1942, as a sub-editor for Malathi magazine run by humourist Thumilan (N Ramaswamy), and after it closed he joined a printing press. At the press a group of fellow employees used to do amateur stage plays, which led him to act in some plays including some Hindi plays. Earlier, he had acted in YMIA Fine Arts' theatre group's play Vairamalai, written by Thottakara Viswanathan, staged at the YMCA, and when the production adapted the stage play into a film, he played the same role in it, thus made his film début in 1954. In the same year, he made his debut as a dramatist and started the Indian National Artists (INA) with four other friends like Malli, Vadiraj, Nataraj and K Balachander. The INA staged plays at reputed Sabhas in Chennai.

Veteran director K Balachander who has won several accolades for memorable films was part of his troupe where he acted and wrote scripts. The INA closed down a decade later and Raghavan entered the cinema world and acted in supporting roles. He has acted in around 1000 films and has also featured in many MGR films. He is also very well known for his role in the TV serial Anni created by K Balachander.

== Partial filmography ==
=== As actor ===
Year	Title	Role	Notes
1954	Vaira Malai		
1955	Kalyanam Seydhukko		
1956	Kaalam Maari Pochu		
1959	Manaiviye Manithanin Manickam		
1962	Kaathirundha Kangal	Dr. Nair	
1962	Nenjil Or Aalayam	Seetha's father	
1962	Sumaithaangi	Rathnavel	
1962	Vanambadi	Somasundaram	
1964	Kalai Kovil		
1964	Bommai	Jagadish	
1964	Kadhalikka Neramillai	Sachidanandam	
1964	Karnan	Vidurar	
1965	Nadu Iravil	Jambulingam	
1966	Chitthi		
1966	Ramu	Doctor	
1966	Madras to Pondicherry	Thanikasalam	
1966	Gowri Kalyanam	Vedhagiri	
1967	Pesum Dheivam	Doctor	
1967	Anubavam Pudhumai		
1967	Ethirigal Jakkirathai	Dinathayalan	
1967	Kadhalithal Podhuma	Somasundaram	
1967	Nenjirukkum Varai	Natarajan	
1967	Ninaivil Nindraval	Umapathi	
1967	Pattanathil Bhootham	Sabapathy	
1968	Kallum Kaniyagum		
1968	Panama Pasama	Shankar's father	
1968	Bommalattam	Dr. Dhamodharan	
1968	Neelagiri Express	Sabapathy	
1968	Oli Vilakku	Commissioner	
1968	Galatta Kalyanam	Masilamani	
1968	Lakshmi Kalyanam	Rajankam	
1968	Machan		
1968	Uyarndha Manidhan	Murugan	
1968	Ethir Neechal		
1969	Iru Kodugal	Janaki's father	
1969	Aayiram Poi	Kanagasabai	
1970	Ethiroli	Public Prosecutor	
1970	Penn Deivam		
1970	Mudhalvar Mahatma		
1970	Vilaiyaattu Pillai	Maragatham's father	
1970	Engal Thangam		
1970	Maanavan	College principal	
1970	Balan		
1971	Savaale Samali	Ayyakannu	
1971	Uyir		
1971	Naangu Suvargal		
1971	Punnagai		
1971	Arunodhayam	Viswanathan	
1971	Avalukendru Or Manam	Sathyamoorthy	
1971	Moondru Dheivangal	retired police officer	
1971	Iru Thuruvam	Jailer	
1971	Nootrukku Nooru	David	
1972	Needhikku Thalaivanangu	Rajasekaran	
1972	Raman Thediya Seethai	Karmeghan	
1972	Sange Muzhangu	Dhayalan	
1972	Kanna Nalama	Lawyer	
1972	Vazhaiyadi Vazhai		
1972	Nawab Naarkali	Raajavelu	
1972	Kurathi Magan		
1972	Raja	Dharmalingam Boopathy	
1973	Deivamsam		
1974	Urimaikural	Sabapathy	
1974	En Magan	D.I.G. Ramnath	
1974	Gumasthavin Magal	Ramaswami	
1974	Sirithu Vazha Vendum	De Selva	
1974	Athaiya Mamiya	Sachinthandham	
1974	Sivagamiyin Selvan	Kavitha's father	
1975	Ellorum Nallavare		
1975	Pallandu Vazhga	Dharmaraj	
1975	Ninaithadhai Mudippavan	Ranjith's father	Guest Appearance
1975	Idhayakkani	Judge	Guest Appearance
1975	Naalai Namadhe	Sharma	
1976	Dasavatharam	Guru Sukracharya	
1976	Mayor Meenakshi		
1976	Needhikku Thalaivanangu	Rajasekaran	
1976	Uzhaikkum Karangal	Sendhil Nadhan	
1977	Sri Krishna Leela	Ugrasenan	
1978	Madhuraiyai Meetta Sundharapandiyan	Minister	
1978	Varuvan Vadivelan	Uma's Father	
1978	Vaazhkai Alaigal		
1978	Aayiram Jenmangal	Ravi's father	
1979	Kalyanaraman	Chinnadurai	
1979	Azhage Unnai Aarathikkiren		
1979	Gnana Kuzhandhai	Sivapada Hrudiyar	
1980	Devi Dharisanam		
1980	Rishi Moolam		Guest Appearance
1980	Savithiri		
1981	Sathya Sundharam		
1981	Bala Nagamma	Karunakaran	
1981	Kalthoon		
1982	Sangili		
1982	Thyagi		
1982	Hitler Umanath		Guest Appearance
1982	Krodham		
1982	Deviyin Thiruvilaiyadal		
1983	Villiyanur Matha		
1984	Rusi		
1984	Simma Soppanam		
1984	Thambikku Entha Ooru	Chandrasekhar	
1984	Kai Kodukkum Kai	Kaalimuthu's brother	
1985	Nalla Thambi	Raghavan	
1985	Santhosha Kanavukal	Kalyani's father	
1985	Navagraha Nayagi		
1985	Padikkadha Pannaiyar		
1985	Poi Mugangal		
1985	Naan Sigappu Manithan	Judge Vishwanathan	
1985	Sri Raghavendrar	Srinivasacharya Devotee	
1985	Naam Iruvar	Somasundaram	
1986	Naanum Oru Thozhilali	Rammohan	
1987	Veerapandiyan	Dharmalingam	
1988	Unnal Mudiyum Thambi		
1989	Sattathin Marupakkam		
1990	Avasara Police 100	Chitra's father	
1992	Idhuthanda Sattam	Venugopal	
2000	Hey Ram	K. T. Chari	
2001	Love Channel	Arumugam	
2001	Poovellam Un Vasam	Chinnasamy	
2004	Kamaraj		
2006	Imsai Arasan 23m Pulikesi	Palace Astrologer	
2008	Thodakkam		
2008	Arai Enn 305-il Kadavul		Cameo
2009	Kudiyarasu	Raghavan	
2010	Irumbu Kottai Murattu Singam	Old man in Jaishankar Puram	Cameo
2010	Kola Kolaya Mundhirika	Masilamani	
2010	Magizhchi	Thiravi's granduncle	
2010	Tamizh Padam	Judge	
2010	Nagaram Marupakkam	Seth	
2012	Nuvvekkadunte Nenakkadunta	Hari's grandfather	Telugu film
2012	Kalakalappu	Maya's Grandfather	
2012	Mudhalvar Mahatma		
2012	Saguni	Kamalakannan's Grandfather	
2013	All in All Azhagu Raja	Sathyamoorthy	
2013	Anna Nee En Deivam		
2013	Idharkuthane Aasaipattai Balakumara		Special appearance in the song "Prayer Song"
2014	Oru Kanniyum Moonu Kalavaanikalum		
2015	Indru Netru Naalai	Victim	
2018	Kaathadi		

== TV serials ==
Year	Title	Channel	Role	Notes
2003	Anni	Jaya TV	Ramanathan's father	
2006	Penn	Sun TV	Ranganayaki's father	
2008	Rekha IPS	Kalaignar TV		
2012	Bhairavi Aavigalukku Priyamanaval	Sun TV	Guest Appearance	Episode 3
2012	Valli	Sun TV	Swaminathan Subbu's grandfather	Episode 16–449

== Short films ==
- Alaivarisai (2013)
