= Pulamaipithan =

Indian scholar, poet, and lyricist (1935–2021)

Pulavar Pulamaipithan

5th Presidium Chairman of AIADMK
- In office 17 December 2002 – 24 May 2003
- General Secretary: J. Jayalalithaa
- Preceded by: K. Kalimuthu
- Succeeded by: C. Ponnaiyan

Personal details
- Born: Ramasaamy; 6 October 1935 Irugur, Coimbatore District, Madras Presidency, British India (now Tamil Nadu, India)
- Died: 8 September 2021 (aged 85) Chennai, Tamil Nadu, India
- Spouse: Tamil Arasi
- Children: Pugazhendhi, Kannagi
- Education: TSA Tamil Kalluri, Perur, Coimbatore
- Occupation: Poet, lyricist

Pulavar Pulamaipithan (புலமைப்பித்தன்) (6 October 1935 – 8 September 2021) was an Indian scholar, poet and lyricist who got recognition through the song "Naan yaar nee yaar" which was featured in the Tamil film Kudiyirundha Koyil in 1968. He briefly served as the presidium chairman of AIADMK from 2002 to 2003, when he resigned citing ill-health.

== Biography ==
Pulamaipithan was born in Irugur, Coimbatore, Tamil Nadu on 6 October 1935. At the early age Pulavar used to work in textile mill known as Combodia mills in Coimbatore and also studied his Tamil literature in Tavatiru Shanthalinga Adigalar Perur Tamil Kaluri Coimbatore. He came to Chennai in 1964 with the ambition of writing songs for Tamil films. He worked as a Tamil teacher at Santhome high school before he started writing lyrics in Tamil films.

He served as Deputy Chairman of the Tamil Nadu Legislative Council. In July 1984, He was appointed "Arasavai Kavignar" (poet laureate) by the former Chief Minister of Tamil Nadu, M. G. Ramachandran.

Pulamaipithan died on 8 September 2021 at the age of 85.

== Books ==
- Boogolamae Bali Peedamaai

== Partial filmography and poetry ==
He penned thousands of poems, some of which are:

1. "Kudiyirundha Koyil"
2. "Adimai Penn"
3. "Kumari Kottam"
4. "Nalla Neram"
5. "Ninaithadhai Mudippavan"
6. "Pallandu Vazhga"
7. "Netru Indru Naalai (1974 film)"
8. "Needhikku Thalaivanangu"
9. "Madhuraiyai Meetta
  Sundharapandiyan"
10. "Sorgathin thirappu vizhaa"
11. "Sivakamiyin Selvan"
12. "Ulagam Sutrum Valiban"
13. "Paruva Kaalam"
14. "Rosapoo Ravikaikari"
15. "Kanni Paruvathile"
16. "Darling, Darling, Darling"
17. "Idhu Namma Aalu"
18. "Mundhanai Mudichu"
19. "Kovil Pura"
20. "Thanga Magan"
21. "Panakkaran"
22. "Kaakki Sattai"
23. "Siva"
24. "Eeramana Rojave"
25. "Nayakan"
26. "Unnal Mudiyum Thambi"
27. "Azhagan"
28. "Mounam Sammadham"
29. "Kathal parisu"
30. "Jayam"
31. "Kasi"
32. "Nandhaa"
33. "Neengal Kettavai"
34. "Nooravathu Naal"
35. "Thevaikal"
36. "Pavithra"
37. "Naan Yen Piranthen"
38. "Aaniver"
39. "Kakki sattai"
40. "Raja Kaiya Vacha"
41. "Seetha"
42. "Nilavu Suduvathillai"
43. "Oorkavalan"
44. "Neethiyim Marupakkam"
45. "Enga Thambi"
46. "Naan Sigappu Manithan"
47. "Kuzhanthai Yesu"
48. "Sirayil Pootha Chinna Malar"
49. "Idhya Veenai"
50. "Maragatha Veenai"
51. "Deepam"
52. "Panneer Nadhigal"
53. "Kaathal Kiligal"
54. "Thaalatu"
55. "Kashmir Kathali"
56. "Vaaliban"
57. "Dharma Seelan"
58. "Kanna Thorakkanum Saami"
59. "Onna Irukka Kathukanum"
60. "Ezhuthaatha Sattanggal"
61. 'Thudikkum Karangal"
62. "Yeetti"
63. "Rojavin Raja"
64. "Muthalali Amma"
65. "Manjal Nila"
66. "Sonnathu Neethana"
67. "Ilaiyavan"
68. "Mella Pesungal"
69. "Naan Puticha Maappillai"
70. "Jeeva Nadi"
71. "Sakkaalaththi"
72. "Raja Rajathaan"
73. "Seerivarum Kaalai"
74. "Anbin Mugavari"
75. "Kodai Mazhai"
76. "Thirupura Sundari"
77. "Vaazhkai"
78. "Thandikapatta Nyayangal"
79. "Ulley Veliye"
80. "Kathirukka Neramillai"
81. "Thodarum"
82. "Thiruppumunai"
83. "Jigu Jigu Rail"
84. "Vietnam Colony"
85. "Agni Paarvai"
86. "Thedi Vantha Raasa"
87. "Gowri"
88. "Bandham"
89. "Sattam Oru Vilayaattu"
90. "Amutha Gaanam"
91. "Vidinja Kalyanam"
92. "Imsai Arasan 23rd Pulikecei"
93. "Indiralohathil Na Azhagappan"
94. "Tenaliraman"
95. "Chithirayil Nilachoru"
96. "Arima Nambi"
97. "Theri (film)"
98. "Raja Rishi"
99. "Eli"

== Discography ==
List of film song lyricist credits
Year	Film	Songs	Notes
1968	Kudiyirundha Koyil	"Naan Yaar Nee Yaar"	
1969	Adimai Penn	"Aayiram Nilave Vaa"	
1971	Kumari Kottam	"Aaduvathu Udalukku", "Enge Aval"	
1972	Nalla Neram	"Odi Odi Uzhaikanum"	
1974	Netru Indru Naalai	"Paadum Bothu", "Nee Ennenna"	
1975	Ninaithadhai Mudippavan	"Poomazhai Thoovi", "Kollaiyittavan"	
1975	Pallandu Vaazhga	"Ondre Kulamendru", "Maasi Maasa", "Enna Sugam", "Sorgathin Thirappuvizha"	
1976	Needhikku Thalaivanangu	"Ethanai Manidhargal", "Indha Pachaikili", "Naan Paartha"	
1978	Madhuraiyai Meetta Sundharapandiyan	"Amudha Thamizhil", "Thendralil Aadidum"	
1979	Rosappu Ravikkaikari	"Uchi Vaguntheduthu"	
1982	Darling, Darling, Darling	"Azhagiya Vizhigalil"	
1982	Antha Rathirikku Satchi Illai	"Mani Osaiyum"	
1987	Nayakan	"Nee Oru Kadhal", "Andhi Mazhai", "Nee Oru Kadhal", "Thenpandi Cheemayile"	
1988	Unnal Mudiyum Thambi	"Unnal Mudiyum", "Akkam Pakkam", "Punjai Undu", "Nee Ondru Than", "Maanida Sevai"	
1991	Azhagan	all songs	
1995	Sarigamapadani	all songs	
2001	Kaasi	"Aathorathile", "Maanu Tholu"	
2016	Theri	"Thaaimai"	

== Awards ==
- Tamil Nadu State film award for best lyrics in 1977–78 by the state government for the film Madhuraiyai Meetta Sundharapandiyan
- Tamil Nadu State film award for best lyrics in 1980–81 by the state government for the film Engamma Maharani.
- Tamil Nadu State film award for best lyrics in 1988 by the state government for multiple films.
- Tamil Nadu State film award for best lyrics in 1993 by the state government for the film Pathini Penn
- Periyar award in 2001 by Government of Tamil Nadu.
