= K. R. Vijaya filmography =

The following is the list of films in which K. R. Vijaya has performed. She has acted in almost 500 films.

== Filmography ==
=== Tamil films ===
Year	Film	Role	Notes
1963	Karpagam	Karpagam	
1964	Thozhilali	Meena	
1964	Server Sundaram	Radha	
1964	Deiva Thirumagal		
1964	Karuppu Panam	Devi	
1964	Kai Koduttha Dheivam	Latha	
1965	Idhayak Kamalam	Kamala / Vimala	
1965	Kattu Rani	Rani	
1965	Naanal	Jaya	
1965	Kalyana Mandapam		
1965	Panchavarna Kili	Vani	
1965	Thazhampoo	Kavery	
1965	Thaayum Magalum	Sumathi	
1965	Panam Padaithavan	Shanti	
1966	Saraswati Sabatham	Selvambigai	
1966	Annavin Aasai	Vijaya	
1966	Thattungal Thirakkappadum	Geetha	
1966	Thayin Mel Aanai		
1966	Thenmazhai	Nirmala	
1966	Ramu	Lakshmi alias Seetha Lakshmi	
1966	Selvam	Valli	
1966	Chinnanchiru Ulagam		
1966	Yarukaka Azhudan	Lodger	
1966	Naan Aanaiyittal	Mala Kanagarathnam	
1967	Ooty Varai Uravu	Vijaya	
1967	Manam Oru Kurangu	Maruthayi / Mallika Devi	
1967	Seetha	Vedha	
1967	Nenjirukkum Varai	Rajeswari	
1967	Ponnana Vazhvu		
1967	Penne Nee Vaazhga		
1967	Muhoortha Naal		
1967	Iru Malargal	Shanthi	
1967	Kandhan Karunai	Goddess Deivayanai	
1967	Paladai	Shantha	
1967	Vivasayee	Vijaya	
1967	Pattanathil Bhootham	Latha	
1967	Ninaivil Nindraval	Prema / Radha	
1967	Thangai	Leela	
1967	Thiruvarutselvar	Paravai Nachiyar Sundaramoorthy	
1968	Paal Manam		
1968	Thanga Valayal		
1968	Thirumal Perumai	Andal	
1969	Akka Thangai	Vijaya	
1969	Pennai Vazha Vidungal	Amudha	
1969	Kanne Pappa	Lakshmi	
1969	Thirudan	Radha	
1969	Avare En Deivam		
1970	Ethiroli	Vijaya	
1970	Kalyana Oorvalam		
1970	Sangamam		
1970	Namma Veettu Deivam	Devi	
1970	Raman Ethanai Ramanadi	Devaki	
1970	Sorgam	Vimala	
1970	Kanmalar		
1970	Nilave Nee Satchi		
1971	Annai Abirami	Goddess Abirami	
1971	Annai Velankanni	Kamakshi	
1971	Aathi Parasakthi		
1971	Kannan Karunai		
1971	Sabatham	Sivakami	
1971	Sudhattam		
1972	Kurathi Magan		
1972	Dheivam	Valliyammai	
1972	Aseervatham		
1972	Enna Muthalali Sowkiyama		
1972	Itho Enthan Deivam		
1972	Kannamma	Kannamma	
1972	Itho Enthan Deivam		
1972	Naan Yen Pirandhen	Saradha	
1972	Thavapudhalavan	Vasanthi	
1972	Shakthi Leelai	Thangam	
1972	Nalla Neram	Viji (Vijaya)	
1973	Bharatha Vilas	Gowri	
1973	Malligai Poo		
1973	Nathayil Muthu	Chelakannu	100th Film
1973	Vayadi		
1973	Sontham		
1974	Thirudi		
1974	Thanga Pathakkam	Lakshmi	
1974	Dheerga Sumangali		
1974	Avalukku Nigar Avale		
1974	Engal Kula Dheivam		
1974	Maanikka Thottil		
1974	Roshakkari		
1974	Devi Shri Karumariamman	Goddess Karumariamman	
1975	Janaki Sabadham		
1975	Thai Veettu Seedhanam		
1975	Kasthuri Vijayam		
1975	Aayirathil Oruthi	Janaki	
1976	Gruhapravesam	Lakshmi	
1976	Maharasi Vazhga		
1976	Dasavatharam	Yashoda	
1976	Mittai Mummy		
1976	Vayilla Poochi		
1976	Mayor Meenakshi		
1976	Akka		
1977	Deviyin Thirumanam		
1977	Naam Pirandha Mann	Deivanayanki	
1977	Thunayiruppal Meenakshi		
1977	Thanikudithanam		
1977	Roudi Raakkamma		
1977	Murugan Adimai	Valliyammai	
1977	Gaslight Mangamma		
1978	Justice Gopinath	Radha	
1978	Annapoorni		
1978	Ananda Bhairavi		
1978	Kanchi Kamakshi	Kamakshi	
1978	General Chakravarthi	Dr. Bharathi	
1978	Shri Kanchi Kamakshi		
1978	Karunai Ullam		
1978	Varuvan Vadivelan		
1979	Suprabadham		
1979	Thirisoolam	Sumathi	
1979	Aasaikku Vayasillai		
1979	Velli Ratnam		
1979	Neela Malargal	Santhi	
1979	Naan Vazhavaippen	Vijaya	
1979	Nadagame Ullagam		
1979	Ore Vaanam Ore Bhoomi		
1980	Natchathiram		
1980	Devi Dharisanam	Goddess Shakti	
1980	Mangala Nayagi		
1980	Dharma Raja		
1980	Inaindha Dhuruvangal		
1980	Pagai Thiruthal Panjali		
1980	Rishi Moolam	Gokila	
1981	Anjatha Nenjangal		
1981	Kalthoon		
1981	Sathya Sundharam		
1981	Kaalam		
1982	Asthivaram		
1982	Deviyin Thiruvilaiyadal	Thengai shreenivasan's wife	
1982	Oorukku Oru Pillai		
1982	Ranga	Lakshmi	
1982	Hitler Umanath	Lakshmi	
1982	Naan Kudithukonde Iruppen		
1982	Thaai Mookaambikai	Mookayi	
1982	Oorum Uravum		
1983	Apoorva Sahodarigal		
1983	Kaman Pandigai		
1983	Abbhas		
1983	Neethibathi	Radha	
1983	Miruthanga Chakravarthi	Deivanai	
1983	Sumangali		
1983	Yuga Dharmam		
1983	Yamirukka Bayamen		
1984	Vamsa Vilakku	Thaiyamma	
1984	Simma Soppanam		
1984	Iru Medhaigal		
1984	Sarithira Nayagan		
1984	Tharaasu	Valli	
1984	Thanga Koppai	Lakshmi	
1985	Pudhu Yugam	Saradha	
1985	Navagraha Nayagi	Adhiparashakthi and Kathyayini	
1985	Padikkadha Pannaiyar		
1985	Melmaruvathur Adhiparasakthi		
1985	Aval Sumangalithan	Mangalam	
1985	Sri Raghavendrar	Goddess Saraswati	
1985	Raja Rishi	Parvathi	
1985	Samayapurathale Satchi	Judge	
1986	Dharmam		
1986	Saadhanai		
1986	Bathil Solval Bathrakali		
1986	Annai En Deivam	Meenakshi	
1986	Mel Maruvathoor Arpudhangal	Goddess Adi Shakti	
1986	Jothi Malar		
1986	Machakaran		
1986	Mahasakthi Mariamman	Goddess Mariamman	
1986	Aayiram Kannudayaal	Goddess Mariamman	
1987	Mupperum Deviyar		
1987	Per Sollum Pillai	Rajalakshmi	
1987	Thaye Neeye Thunai	Goddess Adi Shakti	
1987	Velaikkaran	Savithri	
1987	Krishnan Vandhaan		
1987	Velundu Vinaiyillai		
1988	Namma Ooru Nayagan	Lakshmi	
1988	Kai Koduppal Karpagambal		
1988	Veedu Manaivi Makkal		
1989	Meenakshi Thiruvilayadal	Arundathi	
1989	Paattukku Oru Thalaivan	Shenbagam	
1989	En Arumai Manaivi		
1989	Thaaya Thaarama	Lakshmi	
1989	Valathu Kalai Vaithu Vaa		
1989	Anbu Kattalai		
1990	Vaigasi Poranthachu	Parvathi	
1990	Thangaikku Oru Thalattu	Gopi's mother	
1990	Pengal Veettin Kangal	Dhanalakshmi	
1990	Vaazhnthu Kaattuvom	Sekhar's mother	
1991	Sri Srisaila Bhramarambika Kataksham	Raja's mother	
1991	Kaaval Nilayam	Ravi's wife	
1991	Mahaamayi		
1991	Namma Ooru Mariamma	Mariamma	
1992	Suyamariyadhai	Durga	
1992	Annan Ennada Thambi Ennada	Bhavana	
1992	Naalaiya Theerpu	Judge	
1992	Agni Paarvai	Raja's mother	
1993	Udan Pirappu	Sumathi's aunt	
1993	Amma Ponnu	Bharani's mother	
1993	Varam Tharum Vadivelan	Goddess Parvati	
1994	Raja Pandi		
1994	Muthal Manaivi	Rajeswari	
1995	Aanazhagan	Landlady	
1995	Ellame En Rasathan	Singarasu's grandmother	
1995	Kolangal	Karppagam	
1995	Varraar Sandiyar	Annapoorni	
1996	Vetri Vinayagar	Goddess Parvati	
1996	Vaazhga Jananayagam		
1996	Subash	Nithyananda Swamy's assistant	
1997	Vivasaayi Magan		
1997	Adhipathi	Kamakshi	
1998	Kavalai Padathe Sagodhara		
1999	Mannavaru Chinnavaru	Shanmugasundaram's wife	
2000	Pottu Amman	Navaneetham	
2002	Junior Senior		
2004	Shock	Manju's mother	
2005	Chandramukhi	Kasthuri (Senthil's mother)	
2008	Dasavathaaram	Megha Mukhtaar	Cameo appearance
2009	Munnar	Judge	
2011	Aadu Puli	Sampoornam	
2012	Virudhunagar Sandhippu		
2013	Suvadugal		
2017	143		
2017	Maaya Mohini		
2021	Chakra	Chandru's grandmother	
2023	Kodai	Roja	
2023	Rayar Parambarai		
2023	Moothakudi		
2025	Konjam Kadhal Konjam Modhal	Maha	
2026	99/66		
2026	Sandakkari	Vetri's grandmother	

=== Malayalam films ===
Year	Film	Role	Notes
1964	Aadyakiranangal	Marykutty	
1964	Manavatti	Sheela	
1965	Odayil Ninnu	Lakshmi	
1965	Sakunthala	Shakunthala	
1966	Anarkali	Anarkali / Nadira	
1966	Thilothama	Thilothama	
1967	Bhagyamudra		
1967	Anveshichu Kandethiyilla	Susamma	
1967	Sheelavathi	Sheelaavathi	
1968	Kodungallooramma	Kannagi	
1968	Ragini		
1970	Ammayenna Sthree	Bindhu	
1970	Nishagandhi		
1973	Nakhangal	Saraswathy	
1974	Honeymoon		
1975	Ayodhya	Lakshmi	
1976	Aayiram Janmangal	Lakshmi	
1976	Amma	Savithri	
1977	Swarna Medal		
1977	Santha Oru Devatha	Santha	
1978	Bhaaryayum Kaamukiyum		
1978	Kudumbam Namukku Sreekovil	Susheela	
1978	Nivedyam	Sulochana	
1978	Yagaswam	Sreedevi	
1978	Thacholi Ambu	Kunjitheyi	
1979	Maamaankam	Manka	
1979	Ezham Kadalinakkare		
1979	Tharangam	Saumini	
1980	Pappu	Herself	
1980	Pavizha Mutthu	Sindhu	
1981	Kolilakkam	Prabhakaran's wife	
1982	Mukhangal	Prabha Menon	
1982	Irattimadhuram	Madhavikutty	
1982	Kaalam	Janaki	
1982	Keni	Nirmala Rajendran	
1982	Aayudham	Susheela	
1982	Aalolam	Savithri	
1982	Mylanji	Moideen's illegal wife	
1982	John Jaffer Janardhanan	Sumathy	
1983	Thimingalam		
1983	Aadhipathyam	Amina	
1984	Ithiri Poove Chuvannapoove	Meenakshi	
1984	Parannu Parannu Parannu	Susan	
1984	Ezhu Swarnagal		
1984	Jeevitham	Radha	
1984	Justice Raja	Sreedevi	
1984	Anthassu		
1985	Aazhi		
1985	Vellam	Unnimaya	
1987	Sreedharante Onnam Thirumurivu	Sarada	
1988	Simon Peter Ninakku Vendi	Savithri	
1990	Appu	Mangalathe Amma	
1991	Avanikunnile Kinnarippookkal	Dr. Rajalakshmi	
1992	Champakulam Thachan	Karthyayani	
1993	Kalippattam	Doctor	
1993	Yaadhavam	Prabhadevi	
1995	Thirumanassu	Thampuratti	
1999	Pranaya Nilavu	Lakshmi	
1999	Friends		
2002	Nakshathrakkannulla Rajakumaran Avanundoru Rajakumari	Bhageerathiyamma	
2003	Mr. Brahmachari	Vasumathi	
2009	Malayali	Madhavan's mother	
2011	Arabi Ponnu	Umma	
2011	Naayika	Herself	Archive footage/Uncredited cameo
2013	Players (film)	Rose's grandmother	
2015	Two Countries	Herself	Uncredited cameo/Archive footage
2018	Karinkannan	Dr. Nirmala	
2024	Randam Pranayamahayudham	Mani's mother	

=== Telugu films ===
Year	Film	Role	Notes
1966	Paramanandayya Sishyula Katha	Chitralekha	
1966	Bhakta Pothana	Sita	
1966	Sri Krishna Pandaveeyam	Rukmini	
1968	Asadhyudu		
1969	Bhale Tammudu	Geeta	
1969	Bhale Abbayilu	Meena	
1969	Kannula Panduga	Meenakshi	
1969	Manushulu Marali		
1969	Sipayi Chinnayya	Kannamma	
1969	Ekaveera	Ekaveera	
1970	Sridevi		
1970	Lakshmi Kataksham	Rani Hemamalini	
1970	Maa Manchi Akkayya		
1971	Bhale Papa	Kalyani	
1971	Ma Ila Velpu	Devi	
1972	Sabhash Vadina		
1972	Kodalu Pilla		
1973	Devi Lalitamba	Goddess Lalita	
1978	Sati Savitri	Goddess Adi Parashakti	
1978	Melu Kolupu	Shanti Devi	
1979	Sri Vinayaka Vijayamu	Goddess Durga	
1981	Prema Simhasanam	Lakshmi	
1981	Bala Nagamma	Nagadevi	
1981	Tyagayya	Kamalamba	
1982	Talli Kodukula Anubandham		
1983	Siripuram Monagadu		
1984	Bhale Ramudu	Savithri Devi	
1984	Sri Santhoshi Matha Vrata Mahatyam	Goddess Santoshi Mata	
1985	Sri Datta Darsanam	Goddess Renuka	
1985	Bhale Thammudu	Rajendra's Fiance	
1985	Sri Datta Darsanam	Goddess Renuka	
1986	Ukku Manishi	Parvathi	
1986	Ashtalakshmi Vaibhavamu	Goddess Lakshmi	
1986	Chaitanyam		
1986	Daku Rani		
1986	Patnam Pilla Palletoori Chinnodu		
1987	Majnu	Rajesh's mother	
1987	Jaganmatha	Goddess Adi Shakti	
1987	Pagabattina Panchali		
1987	Viswanatha Nayakudu	Viswanatha Nayak's mother	
1987	Thalli Godavari		
1988	Ugranethrudu	Chandramati Devi	
1988	Yogi Vemana		
1988	Veguchukka Pagatichukka		
1988	Rocky		
1989	Sutradharulu	Yashodamma	
1990	Iddaru Iddare	Lakshmi	
1990	Raja Vikramarka	Queen	
1990	Vishnu		
1991	Srisaila Bhramarambika Kataksham		
1992	Karuninchina Kanaka Durga	Goddess Durga	
1992	Sukravaram Mahalakshmi		
1993	Kunthee Puthrudu		
1994	Bhairava Dweepam	Vasundhara	
1994	Raithu Bharatam		
1994	O Thandri O Koduku		
1994	Dongala Rajyam		
1995	Miss 420		
1996	Sri Krishnarjuna Vijayam	Queen Kunti	
1996	Jagadeka Veerudu		
2000	Durga	Navaneetham	
2001	Trinetram	Goddess Durga	
2004	Bhadradri Ramudu	Manka	
2005	Nayakudu	Bharatamma	
2006	Hanumanthu	Grandmother	
2006	Chukkallo Chandrudu	Shravani's grandmother	
2010	Simha	Srimannarayana's grandmother	
2011	Sri Rama Rajyam	Queen Kausalya	
2011	100% Love	Mahalakshmi	

=== Hindi films ===
Year	Film	Role	Notes
1965	Oonche Log	Vimala Prabhu	
1988	Mile Sur Mera Tumhara	Herself	Indian Song Video

=== Kannada films ===
Year	Film	Role	Notes
1977	Banashankari		
1983	Chinnadantha Maga		
1985	Mareyada Manikya		
1990	Anna Thammudu	Rajeswari Devi	
1994	Om Sakthi		
1994	Mahashakti Maye		
1995	Mutthinantha Hendathi		
2000	Deepavali		
2003	Ondagona Baa	Raghu's grandmother	
