= V. Gopalakrishnan (actor) =

Indian stage and film actor

- Born: Venkataraman Gopalakrishnan; 1933; Tiruchirappalli, Madras Presidency, British India
- Died: 29 April 1998 (aged 64–65); Chennai, Tamil Nadu, India
- Other name: Gopi
- Occupation: Actor
- Years active: 1947–1997
- Spouse: Lalitha
- Children: 2

Venkataraman Gopalakrishnan (1933 – 29 April 1998), was an Indian stage and film actor who was active in Tamil cinema during the latter half of the 20th century. He was well known for playing negative and supporting roles, but was also a successful character actor. In a career spanning five decades, he acted in more than 400 movies in Tamil, Telugu and Hindi. He could converse in eloquent English, something that the film industry admired.

== Early life ==
Gopalakrishnan was born in 1933, in Tiruchirappalli. At the age of 9, he started his career as child artiste. He joined in the St. Joseph's College, Tiruchirappalli, when finished his bachelor's degree and he shifted into Madras joined University of Madras in Chennai and finished his master's degree. He showed interest in stage plays and joined a drama troupe in Tamil theatre and began to perform stage plays.

== Personal life ==
Gopalakrishnan was married to Lalitha. They had two sons. He died on 29 April 1998.

== Partial filmography ==
=== 1940s ===
Year	Movie	Role	Ref(s)
1947	Miss Malini	Office boy	

=== 1950s ===
Year	Movie	Role	Ref(s)
1950	Ezhai Padum Padu		
1950	Beedala Patlu		
1956	Naane Raja	Thananjayan	
1956	Paasavalai		
1957	Aaravalli	Prince Abimanyu	
1959	Azhagarmalai Kalvan		
1959	Thaai Magalukku Kattiya Thaali	Gopal (John)	

=== 1960s ===
Year	Movie	Role	Ref(s)
1960	Padikkadha Medhai		
1962	Kathirunda Kangal		
1963	Idhayathil Nee	Shankar/Chinna Kannu	
1963	Idhu Sathiyam		
1963	Thulasi Maadam	Thomas	
1964	Bommai	Taxi driver	
1964	Kalai Kovil		
1965	Hello Mister Zamindar		
1965	Kalangarai Vilakkam	Doctor Gopal	)
1965	Neerkumizhi	Arun	
1966	Nadodi		
1967	Kandhan Karunai		
1967	Nenjirukkum Varai		
1967	Paaladai		
1967	Thiruvarutchelvar		
1968	Galatta Kalyanam	Gopalakrishnan	
1968	Lakshmi Kalyanam		
1969	Aayiram Poi	Singaram	
1969	Annaiyum Pithavum		
1969	Kaaval Dheivam		

=== 1970s ===
Year	Movie	Role	Ref(s)
1970	Malathi	Sukumar	
1970	Nadu Iravil	Ranga Rajan	
1970	Navagraham	Mali	
1970	Thirumalai Thenkumari	Prohit	
1970	Vairagyam		
1971	Aathi Parasakthi	Prohit	
1971	Sumathi En Sundari	Director Chinnasamy	
1971	Kankatchi		
1971	Meendum Vazhven	Rathnam	
1971	Nootrukku Nooru	Robert	
1971	Punnagai	Haniff	
1972	Deivam	Vadivelu	
1972	Raman Thediya Seethai		
1972	Naan Yen Pirandhen	Doctor Shankar	
1972	Thavapudhalavan		
1972	Velli Vizha	Joseph	
1972	Kurathi Magan		
1972	Dhikku Theriyadha Kaattil	Ganesh	
1973	Komatha En Kulamatha	Somasundaram	
1973	Engal Thai		
1973	Ulagam Sutrum Valiban	Doctor	
1973	Vandhaale Magaraasi	Cameo Appearance	
1974	Engal Kula Deivam		
1974	Devi Sri Karumari Amman		
1974	Netru Indru Naalai	Manickam's (Kumar's) foster father	
1974	Sirithu Vazha Vendum		
1974	Ungal Viruppam		
1975	Andharangam		
1975	Idhayakkani	Madhava Rao	
1975	Naalai Namadhe	Robert	
1975	Ninaithadhai Mudippavan	The Doctor	
1975	Melnaattu Marumagal		
1975	Pallandu Vazhga	Jail Warden	
1976	Athirshtam Azhaigirathu		
1976	Jai Jagat Janai	The Prohit	
1976	Muthana Muthallavo		
1976	Needhikku Thalaivanangu	Gopal	
1976	Oorukku Uzhaippavan	Police inspector	
1977	Avar Enakke Sontham		
1977	Indru Pol Endrum Vaazhga	Gopi	
1977	Murugan Adimai		
1978	Raajavukku Etha Raani		
1978	Sadhurangam	Masilamani	
1978	Ilamai Oonjal Aadukirathu		
1978	Sri Kanchi Kamakshi		
1978	Mela Thalangal		
1979	Azhage Unnai Aarathikkiren		
1979	Dharma Yuddham	Dr. Amarnath	
1979	Enippadigal	Actor Gopalakrishnan	
1979	Kadvul Amaitha Medai		
1979	Suprabatham		

=== 1980s ===
Year	Movie	Role	Ref(s)
1980	Thunive Thozhan		
1980	Valli Mayil		
1980	Devi Dharisanam		
1981	Thee		
1981	Kilinjalgal	David	
1981	Sankarlal		
1981	Neruppile Pootha Malar		
1981	Ram Lakshman		
1981	Ranuva Veeran		
1981	Sivappu Malli		
1982	Adhisayappiravigal		
1982	Asthivaaram		
1982	Andagaadu (Telugu)		
1982	Darling, Darling, Darling	Gopi	
1982	Ninaivellam Nithya		
1982	Paap Ko Jala Doonga		
1982	Parvaiyin Marupakkam	Professor Peter	
1982	Paritchaikku Neramaachu		
1982	Simla Special		
1982	Sivantha Kangal		
1982	Sparisam		
1982	Vazhvey Maayam		
1982	Thanikattu Raja		
1983	Apoorva Sahodarigal		
1983	Dowry Kalyanam		
1983	Imaigal		
1983	Sivappu Sooriyan		
1983	Saatchi		
1983	Thanga Magan		
1983	Vellai Roja		
1983	Yuga Dharmam		
1984	Theerppu En Kaiyil		
1984	Vetri		
1984	Chiranjieevi		
1984	Naan Paadum Paadal		
1984	Nalla Naal		
1984	Alaya Deepam		
1984	Ezhuthatha Sattangal		
1984	Naalai Unathu Naal		
1984	Nilavu Suduvathillai		
1984	Iru Medhaigal		
1984	Sathyam Neeye		
1984	Thalaiyanai Manthiram		
1984	Vai Pandal		
1985	Ammavum Neeye Appavum Neeye		
1985	Pudhu Yugam		
1985	Poi Mugangal		
1985	Naan Sigappu Manithan		
1985	Chain Jayapal		
1985	Saavi	Public Prosecutor	
1985	Chinna Veedu		
1985	Irandu Manam		
1985	Kaaki Sattai		
1985	Sugamana Raagangal		
1985	Navagraha Nayagi	The King	
1985	Padikkadha Pannaiyar		
1985	Sonna Nambamatteenga		
1985	Puthiya Theerpu		
1986	December Pookal		
1986	Marumagal		
1986	Thazhuvatha Kaigal		
1986	Uyire Unakkaga	Kadheresan	
1987	Muthukkal Moondru		
1987	Shankar Guru		
1987	Cooliekkaran		
1988	Kaalaiyum Neeye Maalaiyum Neeye		
1988	Dharmathin Thalaivan		
1989	Sattathin Marupakkam	Judge Sundarapandian	

=== 1990s ===
Year	Title	Role	Ref(s)
1990	Ethir Kaatru		
1990	Naanum Indha Ooruthan		
1990	Pudhu Varisu		
1990	Puriyaadha Pudhir	Chakravarthi's father	
1991	Jenma Natchathram	Dr. Philips	
1992	Brahmachari	Gopal	
1992	Senthamizh Paattu		
1992	Nadodi Pattukkaran		
1992	Oor Mariyadhai	Arumugam Thevar	
1993	Pathini Penn		
1995	Chakravarthy	Advocate	
1995	Naan Petha Magane	Indra's father	
1997	Thadayam		
1997	Kadavul		

=== As dubbing artist ===
Year	Film	Character	Ref(s)
1949	Kanniyin Kaadhali	Kalaimani (Madhuri Devi)	
1973	Alaigal	Vishnuvardhan	
1986	Mella Thirandhathu Kadhavu	G. K. Venkatesh	
