= Surinder Kapoor =

Film producer

- Born: 23 December 1925; Peshawar, North-West Frontier Province, British India (present-day Khyber Pakhtunkhwa, Pakistan)
- Died: 24 September 2011 (aged 85); Mumbai, Maharashtra, India
- Occupation: Film producer
- Spouse: Nirmal Kapoor (m. 1955)
- Children: Boney Kapoor (son); Anil Kapoor (son); Sanjay Kapoor (son); Reena Kapoor Marwah (daughter)
- Relatives: Prithviraj Kapoor (first cousin); See Surinder Kapoor family

Surinder Kapoor (23 December 1925 – 24 September 2011) was an Indian film producer. He produced Bollywood films and also served as President of the Film & Television Producers Guild of India from 1995 to 2001.

== Early life ==
Kapoor was born in Peshawar, British India (in present-day Pakistan) into a Punjabi Hindu family, his parents having educated him in the Arya Samaj teachings.

He is a distant relative of the Kapoor family.

== Career ==
As a result of the 1947 partition, Kapoor quit Peshawar for Meerut in Uttar Pradesh before Prithviraj Kapoor, his cousin and a friend of his father, invited him to Bombay (now Mumbai) to join the Hindi film industry. Before that, he had struggled, changing his job 22 times in a year and a half, and began to live in the outhouse of Prihviraj's son, Raj Kapoor.

He started his film career as an assistant director to K. Asif as well a secretary to Hindi film star of the 1950s Geeta Bali, his nephew Shammi Kapoor's wife.

When asked in an interview, how he established S.K.International Films, he quoted in an interview "Rajesh Khanna who played the title-role in Shehzada (1972) was truly of a princely disposition. He started shooting for me without ever discussing the price, saying that we could settle that once the film is made, he said and made banner S. K. International Films became an acknowledged company." His first successful film in Hindi as a producer was Shehzada (1972). directed by K. Shankar which was a remake of Tamil film Idhu Sathiyam (1963). However, Surinder's subsequent releases such as Phool Khile Hain Gulshan Gulshan (1978) were flops, due to which he went into huge debts. Later as a producer in the 1980s he made good money with his productions, which were remakes of Kannada, Tamil or Telugu films like Hum Paanch, Woh Saat Din, Loafer, Judaai, Sirf Tum, Hamara Dil Aapke Paas Hai, Pukar, No Entry - all of them starring his son Anil Kapoor in the lead. His younger son, Sanjay Kapoor was lead actor in Sirf Tum.

The Dada Saheb Phalke Academy honoured him with the Shri L V Prasad Phalke award in 2009.

== Death ==
He died after suffering a cardiac arrest on 24 September 2011.

== Personal life ==
His three sons, Boney, Anil and Sanjay, are also involved in the film industry. Anil Kapoor is an actor. His daughter-in-law was Sridevi married to his eldest son Boney. His daughter, Reena, is married to Sandeep Marwah of Marwah Films and Video Studios. Boney is a film producer and Sanjay acted in several films.

He has been described by his eldest son Boney as a committed socialist and an associate of Achyut Patwardhan.

== Filmography ==
- Milenge Milenge (2010), producer
- No Entry (2005), producer
- Hamara Dil Aapke Paas Hai (2000), producer
- Pukar (2000), producer
- Sirf Tum (1999), producer
- Judaai (1997), producer
- Loafer (1996), producer
- Woh Saat Din (1983), producer
- Hum Paanch (1980), producer
- Phool Khile Hain Gulshan Gulshan (1978), producer
- Ponga Pandit (1975), producer
- Bikash Rao
- Shehzada (1972)
- Ek Shrimaan Ek Shrimati (1969), producer
- Jab Se Tumhe Dekha Hai (1963), producer
- Tarzan Comes to Delhi (1965), producer
- Farishta (1958), producer
