= Karikol Raju =

Tamil actor

- Born: Raju; Madurai
- Other name: Karikol Raj
- Occupations: Actor, Stage Actor
- Years active: 1955-1991

Karikol Raju was an Indian actor who appeared in Tamil-language films. He acted in more than 500 films in a career spanning over five decades. He had started his career as a dramatist and stage actor and went on to act as a character actor, playing villainous roles in films. He acted along with four generation actors like as M. G. Ramachandran, Sivaji Ganesan, Gemini Ganesan, Jai Shankar, Muthuraman, Rajinikanth, Kamal Haasan, Vijayakanth, Mohan, K. Bhagyaraj, Arjun Sarja, Karthik, Prabhu.

== Career ==
Karikol Raju was apt for village character. He did mostly village panchayat leader-like roles. He acted most of Bharathiraja and K.Bhagyaraj's village movies. His notable movies such as Kadhalikka Neramillai, Madras To Pondichery, Kumari Kottam, Rickshawkaran, Thooral Ninnu Pochu, Kozhi Koovuthu.

== Filmography ==
This is a partial filmography. You can expand it.

=== 1950s ===
Year	Film	Role	Notes
1955	Needhipathi		
1955	Mangaiyar Thilakam		
1956	Tenali Raman		
1957	Chakravarthi Thirumagal	Tribe people leader	
1958	Thirumanam		
1958	Mangalya Bhagyam		
1958	Pathi Bakthi		
1958	Pillai Kaniyamudhu		
1959	Mamiyar Mechina Marumagal		
1959	Sivagangai Seemai		
1959	Abalai Anjugam		
1959	Sumangali		
1959	Thaai Magalukku Kattiya Thaali	Astrologer	
1959	Kaveriyin Kanavan		

=== 1960s ===
Year	Film	Role	Notes
1960	Kuravanji		
1960	Raja Desingu		
1960	Sri Valli		
1961	Anbu Magan		
1961	Kumudham		
1961	Naaga Nandhini		
1961	Bhagyalakshmi		
1962	Nenjam Marappathillai		
1962	Policekaran Magal		
1962	Aadi Perukku		
1962	Paadha Kaanikkai	Villager	
1962	Kathiruntha Kangal		
1962	Deivathin Deivam		
1963	Panathottam	Prisoner	
1963	Yarukku Sontham		
1963	Ananda Jothi	Anandhan's father	
1963	Kadavulai Kanden		
1963	Karpagam		
1964	Kadhalikka Neramillai		
1964	Kalai Kovil		
1964	Pachai Vilakku	Karim	
1964	Panakkara Kudumbam		
1964	Aandavan Kattalai	Perumal	
1964	Aayiram Roobai		
1964	Vazhi Piranthadu		
1964	Navarathri		
1964	Kai Kodutha Deivam		
1965	Karthigai Deepam		
1965	Kalangarai Vilakkam		
1965	Panchavarna Kili	Vadivelu	
1966	Chitthi	Marwardi	
1966	Naan Aanaiyittal		
1966	Madras to Pondicherry		
1966	Nee!	Saamy	
1966	Mahakavi Kalidas	Barber	
1966	Gowri Kalyanam		
1966	Chandrodayam		
1966	Kumari Penn		
1966	Petralthan Pillaiya		
1967	Kaavalkaaran	Patient	
1967	Soappu Seeppu Kannadi		
1968	Oli Vilakku		
1968	Pudhiya Bhoomi		
1968	Kannan En Kadhalan	Advocate	
1969	Adimai Penn		
1969	Pennai Vazha Vidungal		
1969	Naangu Killadigal		
1969	Athai Magal		

=== 1970s ===
Year	Film	Role	Notes
1970	Maattukara Velan		
1970	Sorgam	Payilvan	
1970	Kalyana Oorvalam		
1970	Malathi		
1970	Paadhukaappu		
1971	Annai Velankanni	Villager	
1971	Neerum Neruppum		
1971	Veettukku Oru Pillai		
1971	Kumari Kottam		
1972	Rani Yaar Kuzhanthai	Sub Inspector	
1972	Naan Yen Pirandhen	Post man	
1972	Kurathi Magan		
1972	Sange Muzhangu		
1972	Raman Thediya Seethai		
1972	Shakthi Leelai		
1972	Annamitta Kai		
1972	Rani Yaar Kuzhanthai		
1973	Veettukku Vandha Marumagal		
1973	Thedi Vandha Lakshmi		
1974	Yen		
1974	Swathi Natchathiram		
1974	Netru Indru Naalai	Drama Arranger	
1974	Kula Gowravam		
1974	Sirithu Vazha Vendum	Gambler	
1975	Idhayakkani		
1975	Naalai Namathe		
1975	Pallandu Vazhga		
1976	Nalla Penmani		
1976	Uzhaikkum Karangal		
1977	Navarathinam		
1977	Indru Pol Endrum Vaazhga		
1977	Meenava Nanban		
1979	Gnana Kuzhandhai	Puzhalendar	

=== 1980s ===
Year	Film	Role	Notes
1982	Thooral Ninnu Pochchu		
1982	Erattai Manithan		
1982	Kozhi Koovuthu		
1985	Geethanjali		

=== 1990s ===
Year	Film	Role	Notes
1991	Naadu Adhai Naadu		
