= Mupperum Deviyar =

- Poster
- Directed by: K. Shankar
- Screenplay by: K. Shankar
- Story by: K. P. Arivanandham
- Produced by: M. Sarojini Devi
- Starring: K. R. Vijaya; Lakshmi; Sujatha; Prabhu; Ambika
- Cinematography: M. C. Sekar
- Edited by: K. Shankar; V. Devan
- Music by: M. S. Viswanathan
- Production company: Ammu Creations
- Release date: 12 November 1987
- Running time: 136 minutes
- Country: India
- Language: Tamil

Mupperum Deviyar is a 1987 Indian Tamil-language film, directed by K. Shankar and produced by M. Sarojini Devi. The film stars K. R. Vijaya, Sujatha and Lakshmi. It was released on 12 November 1987.

== Plot ==
Sivan, Bramma and Vishnu meet and discuss which of the three is more highly regarded among humans. Their wives are pulled into this discussion and each feels that her respective husband is most highly regarded among the people. All three agree that without them, their husbands wouldn't be able to function. The three gods challenge their wives to spend time on Earth without the benefit of their powers. Saraswathy goes in aid of a poet that must compete against an arrogant man. Lakshmi goes to the home of a devout family that faces many problems. Parvathy must raise the orphaned true prince of a kingdom and restore him to the throne against all odds. All of the gods learn to appreciate each other's importance and work together to stop a large threat.

== Cast ==
- K. R. Vijaya as Goddess Parvathy
- Lakshmi as Goddess Lakshmi
- Sujatha as Goddess Saraswathy
- Prabhu as Sudarshanan
- Ambika
- M. N. Nambiar
- Delhi Ganesh
- Sangili Murugan
- Senthil
- Jai Ganesh
- Vennira Aadai Moorthy
- Oru Viral Krishna Rao
- LIC Narasimhan as Sivan
- Heran Ramasamy
- Sangili Murugan
- Kokila
- Master Sridhar
- Srikanth

== Production ==
The filming was held at Mysore, Shivasamudram falls and Balmuri Falls.

== Soundtrack ==
The music was composed by M. S. Viswanathan.

Song	Singers	Lyrics	Length
"Sapparum Kalviyum"	T M Soundararajan	Vaali	06:14
"Arivil Aathavan Naan"	Seerkazhi Govindarajan, Vani Jairam	Vaali	05:32
"Thirumaal Azhaga"	P.Susheela	Muthulingam	04:41
"Thaneeril Oru Pournamani Thingal"	P. Jayachandran, S. Janaki	Pulamaipithan	04:52
"Moontru Deyivam"	Vanijayaram	Pulamaipithan	05:07
"Kaali Purapattaal"	Seerkazhi Govindarajan, Vani Jairam, T M Soundararajan	K.P. Arivanandham	08:29
