= Thambi Thanga Kambi =

- Theatrical release poster
- Directed by: K. Shankar
- Written by: Aaroor Dass (dialogues)
- Produced by: S. Ganesh
- Starring: Vijayakanth; Lakshmi; Ramya Krishnan; Rekha
- Cinematography: M. C. Sekhar
- Edited by: K. Shankar; V. Devan
- Music by: Gangai Amaran
- Production company: Sankaralaya Pictures
- Release date: 15 July 1988
- Running time: 135 minutes
- Country: India
- Language: Tamil

Thambi Thanga Kambi is a 1988 Indian Tamil-language action film directed by K. Shankar and produced by S. Ganesh. The film stars Vijayakanth, Lakshmi, Ramya Krishnan and Rekha. It is a remake of the 1986 Hindi film Jaal. The film was released on 15 July 1988.

== Plot ==
Shankar lives with his mother and sister and comes from a poor family. As his ailing mother's situation becomes critical, Shankar accepts a job as an auto-driver for a while. Meanwhile, a mysterious rich woman Ganga employs Shankar for a cause, knowing his struggling family in order to earn much more money. He accepts his decision. She sends him in the vicinity of Periya Durai and Jambulingam. Chithra and Uma also visit their family. The rest of the film is on how Shankar helps Ganga to find the solutions to her family problems.

== Cast ==
- Vijayakanth as Shankar
- Lakshmi as Ganga (Kaveri)
- Ramya Krishnan as Chithra
- Rekha as Uma
- M. N. Nambiar as Thyagu
- Radha Ravi as Periya Durai
- Manorama as Auto driver owner
- Malaysia Vasudevan as Jambulingam
- Nizhalgal Ravi as Chinna Durai
- Jai Ganesh as Pasupathy
- Vadivukkarasi as Shankar's mother
- Kovai Sarala
- Senthil as Karuppu
- Charle as Madhu
- Kullamani
- Disco Shanti in a special appearance

== Production ==
Thambi Thanga Kambi, an action film, was a departure from the Hindu mythological films that director K. Shankar was generally known for. It was produced by S. Ganesh under Sankaralaya Pictures. The song "Naan Manamagale" was shot at a bungalow at Kamdar Nagar, Chennai.

== Soundtrack ==
The music is composed by Gangai Amaran.

Track listing
No.	Title	Lyrics	Singer(s)	Length
1.	"Sri Ranjani Yen Sivaranjani"	Vaali	K. J. Yesudas	4:45
2.	"Naan Paadinal Thirakkum"	Vaali	S. P. Sailaja	4:30
3.	"Thai Kulatha Parada"	Muthulingam	S. P. Balasubrahmanyam	4:56
4.	"Naan Endrum"	Vaali	S. P. Balasubrahmanyam	3:53
5.	"Athiri Bacha"	Vaali	S. P. Balasubrahmanyam	4:00
6.	"Naan Manamagale"	Vaali	P. Jayachandran, Vani Jairam	3:09
7.	"Kaadhal Polladhu"	Vaali	P. Susheela, S. P. Balasubrahmanyam, K. S. Chithra	4:45
Total length:				29:58

== Release and reception ==
Thambi Thanga Kambi was released on 15 July 1988. A week later, The Indian Express derisively called it a "garish commercial film", but said the climax sequence was "ambitiously shot". Jayamanmadhan of Kalki wrote they caught on to something that this is the story. A sudden fight, a sudden turn, a sudden song here and there, like a child's comics.
