= Sirkazhi G. Sivachidambaram =

Indian singer

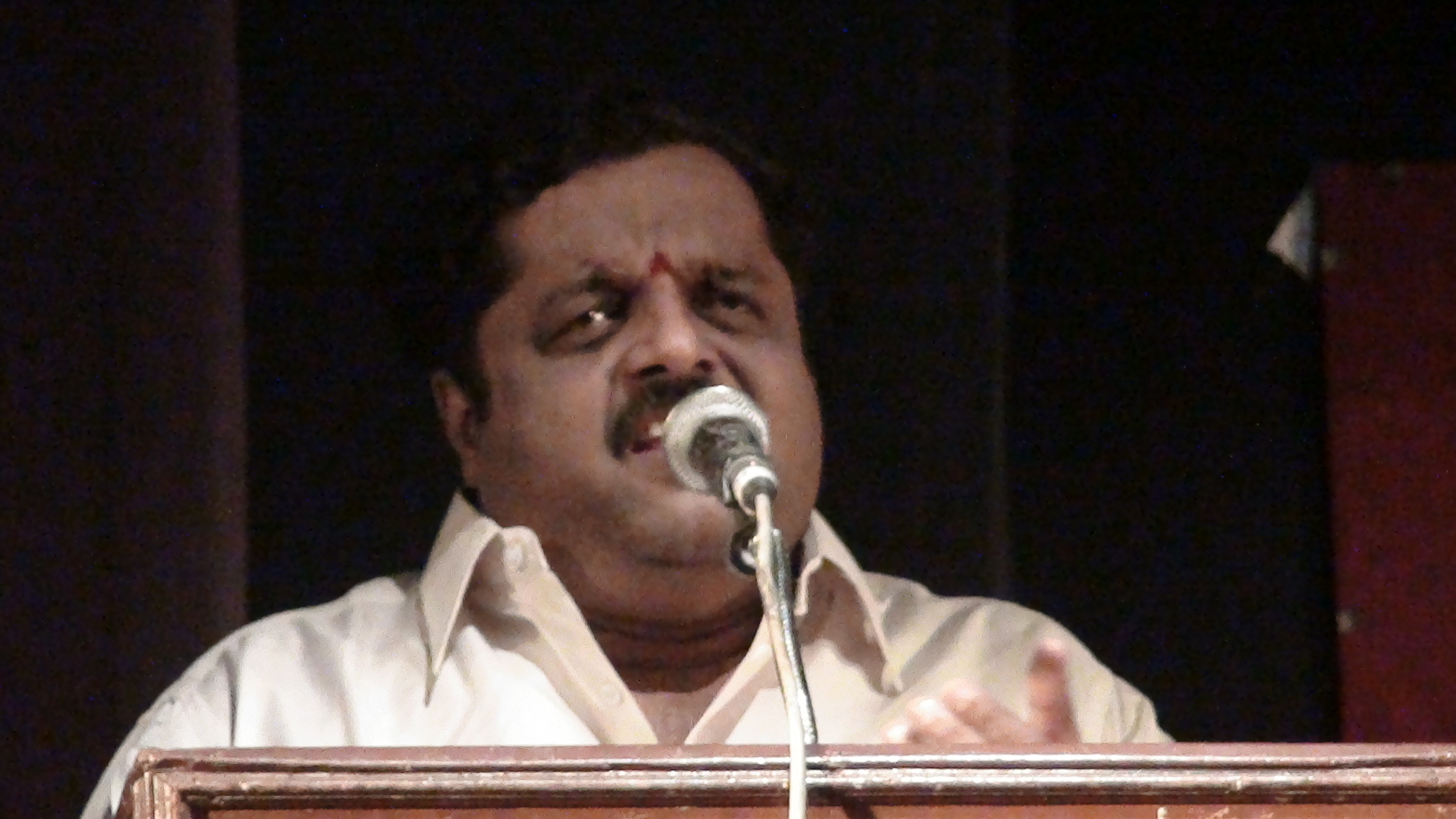
- Sirkazhi G. SivaChidambaram

Background information
- Born: 8 June 1959 (age 67)
- Origin: Chennai, India
- Genres: Carnatic music, Tamil music - Tamilisai, Devotional music, Tamil Cinema Music
- Occupations: Musician, Physician
- Instrument: Vocals
- Website: www.sirkali.org

Sirkazhi G. Sivachidambaram is a physician, Carnatic music vocalist, and playback singer who predominantly works in Tamil cinema.

== Early life ==
Sivachidambaram was born in Chennai. He is the son of Carnatic vocalist Sirkazhi Govindarajan.

He is an alumnus of Madras Medical College, where he earned undergraduate and postgraduate degrees in internal medicine. He attended Trinity College of Music, where he learnt classical and Carnatic music. He is the principle disciple of the great master Sangeetha Vidwan Prof. B.Krishnamurthy in the intricacies and nuances of Indian Classical music, since childhood till date.

== Career ==
Sivachidambaram recorded the song Enadharumai Raanuva Veerargaal written by former President of India A. P. J. Abdul Kalam. His extempore rendition of the song on youth empowerment in Tamil, written by Abdul Kalam, during the inauguration of the Tamil Isai Sangam festival in Chennai, was appreciated.

== Personal life ==
Sivachidambaram is a physician and now works as the Dean/Special Officer at Perambalur Government Medical College, Perambalur, Tamil Nadu, on promotion from his previous designation as a Professor and HOD of Medicine at his alma mater, Madras Medical College, as Director I/C of the Institute of Internal Medicine at MMC.

== Awards ==
Sivachidambaram received the Kalaimamani from the Tamil Nadu government, Madras Music Academy Award for Best Rendering, and Tamil Isai Vendar. In 2008, he received the Padma Shri award from the Government of India. The Tamil Nadu Dr. MGR Medical University honoured him with an honorary doctorate, D.Sc. Honoris causa, in appreciation of his service in the medical field as an eminent physician and teacher of medicine. He was the recipient of the prestigious "Aryabhatta Award" from Karnataka.

Sivachidambaram was awarded the title of "Isai Peraringar" from Tamil Isai Sangam in 2014. In November 2015, he was appointed as the Dean of Perambalur Government Hospital in Tamil Nadu.

Sivachidambaram was appointed a member of the Board of Governors in Dr. J Jayalalithaa Music and Arts University of Tamil Nadu in 2022, and met the then Chief Minister of Tamil Nadu, M. K. Stalin, who congratulated him.

== Philanthropy ==
Sivachidambaram instituted the Isaimani Dr. Seerkazhi S. Govindarajan Memorial Foundation, a charitable trust in memory of his father, to serve the society at large with medical help, scholarships, and educational aids for the unaffordable, apart from taking music to inaccessible areas and exposing traditional musical wealth for all in the nook and corner of the country.

His regular charity concerts are arranged for fundraising for schools and performances in orphanages, senior citizens' old age homes, and terminal health care centres. He has been appreciated by organisations such as the Lions Club and Rotary Club with awards for his charitable contributions. Endowments created by the Isaimani Foundation at the Thiruvannamalai Ramanashramam, Vadalur Sathyagnana Sabha, Annamalai University, Madurai Tamil Isai Sangam towards annadhanam feeding and youth appreciation awards.

== Discography ==
Year	Film	Language	Song title	Music director	Co-singer
1982	Manjal Nila	Tamil	Busse Busse Coloure	Ilaiyaraaja	Deepan Chakravarthy & Saibaba
1983	Miruthanga Chakravarthi	Tamil	Abinaya Sundhari Aadukiraal	M. S. Viswanathan	Vani Jayaram
1983	Sashti Viratham	Tamil	Ammadi Motta Maadi	Shankar–Ganesh	Malaysia Vasudevan, S. P. Sailaja & B. S. Sasirekha
1984	Ithu Enga Boomi	Tamil	Siruthaikale Ondru Serungal	Shankar–Ganesh	T. M. Soundararajan
1984	Ithu Enga Boomi	Tamil	Thangangale Ondru Serungal	Shankar–Ganesh	T. M. Soundararajan
1984	Vaanga Mappillai Vaanga	Tamil	Idho Uruvam	Shankar–Ganesh	P. Susheela
1984	Vaanga Mappillai Vaanga	Tamil	Idhu Enna Vilaiyattu	Shankar–Ganesh	
1984	Vaanga Mappillai Vaanga	Tamil	Thirundhi Vidu	Shankar–Ganesh	
1984	Vaanga Mappillai Vaanga	Tamil	Vaanga Mappillai Vaanga	Shankar–Ganesh	Vani Jayaram
1985	Chidambaram	Malayalam	Aattile Pokum Thani	Devarajan	
1985	Navagraha Nayagi	Tamil	Thennikkal Kattaadha Thenkoodu	M. S. Viswanathan	Vani Jairam
1985	Nermai	Tamil	Vangadi Vangadi	M. S. Viswanathan	S. P. Balasubrahmanyam, S. Janaki & Manorama
1986	Aayiram Kannudaiyall	Tamil	Aayiram Kannudaiyal	Shankar–Ganesh	Vani Jayaram
1987	Ondru Engal Jaathiye	Tamil	Vandi Varudhu Vandi Varudhu	Gangai Amaran	
1987	Ondru Engal Jaathiye	Tamil	Poongaatthu Veesum	Gangai Amaran	
1988	Melam Kottu Thaali Kattu	Tamil	Senthoora Pottu Vecha	Premasiri Khemadasa	Krishnaraj
1988	Sahadevan Mahadevan	Tamil	Sirikkanum Thaikkulanga Sirikkanum	Shankar–Ganesh	
1989	Naalai Manithan	Tamil	Manithanum	Premi–Srini	
1989	Rettai Kuzhal Thuppakki	Tamil	Paai Virichi	Shankar–Ganesh	Vani Jayaram
1989	Rettai Kuzhal Thuppakki	Tamil	Vaare Vaa Indha	Shankar–Ganesh	Vani Jayaram
1991	Azhagan	Tamil	Vandhaen Vandhaen	Maragadha Mani	Malaysia Vasudevan & K. S. Chitra
1992	Amaran	Tamil	Abhyam Krishna Naragaasuran	Adithyan	T. K. Kala
1993	Rajadhi Raja Raja Kulothunga Raja Marthanda Raja Gambeera Kathavaraya Krishna Kamarajan	Tamil	Manichana Manichan	Mansoor Ali Khan	Chandrabose
1995	Indira	Tamil	Odakara Marimuthu	A. R. Rahman	S. P. Balasubrahmanyam
1995	Murai Maman	Tamil	Yennachi Yennachi	Vidyasagar	Arunmozhi & Swarnalatha
1995	Murai Maman	Tamil	Mannavargal Vantha Kudi	Vidyasagar	Deepan Chakravarthy
1998	Cheran Chozhan Pandian	Tamil	Thirunelveli Halwa	Soundaryan	Krishnaraj & Harini
1999	Jodi	Tamil	Anjathe Jeeva	A. R. Rahman	Swarnalatha
2000	Manu Needhi	Tamil	Koottam Romba	Deva	Anuradha Sriram
2001	Engalukkum Kaalam Varum	Tamil	Ambilaikku Theriyum	Deva	Swarnalatha
2001	Sri Raja Rajeshwari	Tamil	Kaathile Maan	Deva	
2003	Kovilpatti Veeralakshmi	Tamil	Dheem Tharikida	Adithyan	
2003	Parthiban Kanavu	Tamil	Vaadi Machhiniyae	Vidyasagar	Malathy Lakshman
2005	Aanai	Tamil	Kumru Kumrur	D. Imman	Annupamaa
2005	Kannadi Pookal	Tamil	Hey Silu Silu	S. A. Rajkumar	Nithyasree Mahadevan
2006	Sillunu Oru Kaadhal	Tamil	Kummi Adi	A. R. Rahman	Swarnalatha, Naresh Iyer, Theni Kunjarammal & Vignesh
2006	Nuvvu Nenu Prema	Telugu	Ammadini Chusethi	A. R. Rahman	Swarnalatha, Naresh Iyer, Theni Kunjarammal & Vignesh
2010	Bale Pandiya	Tamil	Sirikkiren	Devan Ekambaram	Naresh Iyer, Mano, Dr. Burn & Uma Shankar
2010	Gowravargal	Tamil	Bramastharam	Dhina	
2011	Uchithanai Muharnthaal	Tamil	Yeno Yeno	D. Imman	
2012	Lollu Dha Dha Parak Parak	Tamil	Panam Panam Kasu Panam	Mansoor Ali Khan	Mansoor Ali Khan
2012	Aravaan	Tamil	Naagamalai Sanchuidchu	Karthik	Gopal & Narayanan
2014	Amara	Tamil	Simmakallu	D. Imman	Chinmayi
2014	Ninaivil Nindraval	Tamil	Nila Adhu	D. Imman	Anuradha Shekhar
2017	Kanavu Variyam	Tamil	Kirukkan	Shyam Benjamin	

== Acting ==
=== Films ===
Year	Film	Notes			
1989	’’Meenakshi Thiruvilayadal’’	’’Agathiyar’’	2014	Aranmanai	cameo in song "Unnaiye Ennaiye"

=== Television ===
Year	Serial	Channel	Notes
2025	Pavithra	Kalaignar TV	
