= Miruthanga Chakravarthi =

1983 film by K. Shankar

- Theatrical release poster
- Directed by: K. Shankar
- Screenplay by: A. L. Narayanan
- Story by: Kalaignanam
- Produced by: Sakunthala N
- Starring: Sivaji Ganesan; K. R. Vijaya; M. N. Nambiar; V. K. Ramasamy; Prabhu; Sulakshana
- Cinematography: M.C. Shekar
- Edited by: K. Shankar
- Music by: M. S. Viswanathan
- Production company: Bhairavi Films
- Release date: 24 September 1983
- Country: India
- Language: Tamil

Miruthanga Chakravarthi (transl. The Mridangam Maestro) is a 1983 Indian Tamil-language musical drama film directed by K. Shankar and produced by Sakunthala N. The film stars Sivaji Ganesan, K. R. Vijaya, M. N. Nambiar, V. K. Ramasamy, Prabhu and Sulakshana. It was released on 24 September 1983.

== Plot ==
Subbaiah is a maestro when it comes to playing Mridangam. He is so renowned that he outshines the singers to whom he serves as accompaniment much to their jealousy. They manipulate the situation where they get his fellow musicians to question his integrity as the chief of union of mridangam causing him to vow off touching mridangam ever again.

His son, however shows keen interest which he discourages. As fate would have it, his son falls in love with the daughter of a music lover. Further, his enemy who has now relented, feels guilty and wants the great musician to come back. They use his son as a prop to challenge him forcing him to come back and play one last time. He wins outshining his very talented and capable son on stage and retires due to the pressure of playing after a long time with such high stakes.

== Cast ==
- Sivaji Ganesan as Subbaiah Pillai
- K. R. Vijaya as Deivanai
- M. N. Nambiar as Neelakandan Pillai
- V. K. Ramasamy as Rajarathnam Pillai
- Prabhu as Kannan
- Sulakshana as Radha
- Thengai Srinivasan
- Senthil
- Y. G. Mahendran
- Manorama as Ranjitha

== Production ==
Madurai T. Srinivasan played the mridangam offscreen for Prabhu. The song "Idhu Kekka Thikathadha" was picturised at R. R. Sabha for two days.

== Soundtrack ==
The music was composed by M. S. Viswanathan.Lyrics by VAALI & pulamaipithan

Song	Singers
"Om Nadam Omkara Nadam"	T. M. Soundararajan
"Idhu Ketka Thigattatha Ganam"	M. Balamuralikrishna
"Adi Vannakiliye Ingu"	T. M. Soundararajan, P. Susheela
"Gopala Govinda Mugunda"	T. M. Soundararajan
"Abinaya Sundari Aadukiral"	Sirkazhi Sivachidambaram, Vani Jairam
"Sugamana Ragangale"	Vani Jairam

== Critical reception ==
Jayamanmadhan of Kalki praised the acting of Sivaji Ganesan, Prabhu, Vijaya, Nambiar and Viswanathan's music. Balumani of Anna praised the acting of cast, Viswanathan's music, Narayanan's dialogues, Manian's screenplay and climax.

== Controversy ==
Initially, the producers, Kalaignanam and T. N. Venkatraman took recordings of earlier mridangam performances from both T. K. Murthy and Umayalpuram K. Sivaraman to decide which one would best suit the role played by Ganesan, leading to a huge conflict with two of the artists narrating each version of their story. However the producers insisted that originally, neither Murthy nor Sivaraman was booked for any particular role and that Murthy "was that he was agreeable to play only for Sivaji, and implicitly in the competition scene".

== Legacy ==
The performance of Ganesan is often used to mock him for over-doing the scene. However, according to Tamilaruvi Manian, Ganesan is said to have replicated the mannerism of Murthy and Sivaraman together to get the essence of his character and only those ignorant of the two would call it overacting. M. G. Ramachandran, then the chief minister, upon his return from the United States, saw a preview of the show and is said to have commented that the only person who can call himself an actor in the whole world was his competitor and rival, Sivaji Ganesan.
