= Kurathi Magan =

- Poster
- Directed by: K. S. Gopalakrishnan
- Screenplay by: K. S. Gopalakrishnan
- Story by: Kalaignanam
- Produced by: Balu
- Starring: Gemini Ganesan; K. R. Vijaya; Master Sridhar; Jayachitra; M. N. Nambiar; Kamal Haasan
- Cinematography: K. S. Prasad
- Edited by: R. Devarajan
- Music by: K. V. Mahadevan
- Production company: Ravi Productions
- Release date: 29 April 1972
- Running time: 172 minutes
- Country: India
- Language: Tamil

Kurathi Magan is a 1972 Indian Tamil-language film directed by K. S. Gopalakrishnan. The film features Gemini Ganesan, K. R. Vijaya, Master Sridhar and Jayachitra introduced in the film, Shylashri, V. S. Raghavan, Suruli Rajan and Kamal Haasan in a brief role. R. Muthuraman plays a cameo. The film was released on 29 April 1972.

== Plot ==
Kuppi, a courageous woman from the marginalized Kuravar community is falsely accused of unchastity and excommunicated by her clan leader husband. Driven by a desire to shield her son from illiteracy and oppression, she relocates to the city and makes profound maternal sacrifices to secure him a formal education. The central theme emphasizes the transformative power of education and a mother's resilience as the ultimate tools for social elevation and overcoming systemic discrimination.

== Cast ==
- Gemini Ganesan as Malai Kottai
- K. R. Vijaya as Kuppi
- M. N. Nambiar as Jambilingam
- Master Sridhar as Raja
- Jayachitra
- Kamal Haasan as Ashok
- Shylashri
- V. K. Ramasamy as Natesan
- V. S. Raghavan as Sundaresan
- O. A. K. Thevar as Maruthaveeran
- Karikol Raju
- Suruli Rajan as Upilli
- V. Gopalakrishnan as Karuppan
- G. Sakunthala as Lakshmi
- Shanmugasundaram
- Shanmugasundari
- G. Sakunthala
- S. R. Janaki
- "Baby" Kumutha
- "Baby" Thamizh Selvi
- "Master" Rajkumar
- "Master" Bablu
- R. Muthuraman as Police officer (guest Appearance)
- Sivakumar as Ice cream man (guest Appearance)

== Production ==
Kurathi Magan was the debut film of actress Jayachitra. Padmini and Sivakumar were considered for the Kurathi and Kurathi's son roles, before K. R. Vijaya and Master Sridhar were finalised. Padmini withdrew from the film 2 days after production began as a result of her marriage.

== Soundtrack ==
The music was composed by K. V. Mahadevan, while the lyrics were written by Udumalai Narayana Kavi, Kannadasan and A. Maruthakasi.

Song	Singers	Length
"Anjathe Nee"	T. M. Soundararajan, M. R. Vijaya	06:15
"Geena Geguna"	S. C. Krishnan, Krishnamoorthy, 'Tiruchy' Loganathan, Thangappan, M. R. Vijaya	03:19
"Jaathigal Illaiyadi"	M. R. Vijaya	05:46
"Kurathi Vadi"	T. M. Soundararajan, P. Susheela	03:15
"Nattukkulle"	Seerkazhi Govindarajan, L. R. Eswari	03:13
