= Oorukku Oru Pillai =

- Theatrical release poster
- Directed by: D. Yoganand
- Written by: A. L. Narayanan (dialogues)
- Story by: Sri Gomathishankar Pictures
- Produced by: K. S. Kutralingam
- Starring: Sivaji Ganesan; K. R. Vijaya; M. N. Nambiar; V. K. Ramasamy
- Cinematography: G. Or. Nathan
- Edited by: B. Kandhasamy
- Music by: M. S. Viswanathan
- Production company: Sri Gomathishankar Pictures
- Release date: 5 February 1982
- Country: India
- Language: Tamil

Oorukku Oru Pillai (transl. The favourite son of the village) is a 1982 Indian Tamil-language film, directed by D. Yoganand and produced by K. S. Kutralingam. It stars Sivaji Ganesan, K. R. Vijaya, M. N. Nambiar and V. K. Ramasamy. It was released on 5 February 1982.

== Plot ==
Sivaji and Vijaya are cousins. Vijaya is in love with Sivaji while Sivaji, a hotshot lawyer and junior of Major, is in love with Major's daughter played by Sripriya. On the day of engagement, Sripriya finds out that Vijaya is in love with Sivaji and would kill herself if she cannot marry him. On the altar, she dumps Sivaji without giving a reason and he returns to his native place, giving up his practice.

Sivaji's father's dream was to open a school and put an end to the atrocities of Ramasamy, Nambiar and Srinivasan trio who take advantage of the uneducated masses of their village. They also commit murder and blame it on ghosts with authorities in their cohorts. Coincidentally, Sripriya marries Ramasamy's relative, dies due to alcoholism and leaves her with a child and at Ramasamy's mercy as Major died in shock. She seeks refuge with Sivaji and Vijaya who are now married and run a school standing up against Ramasamy.

Nambiar has designs on Sripriya but Sivaji actively thwarts his attempts which causes rumors of affair between the two. When a student of Sivaji is raped and murdered by Nambiar who blames it on ghosts, Sivaji takes up his practice again and starts to expose Ramasamy. They kidnap Vijaya and Sripriya. After a long struggle, Sivaji saves them only after Sripriya has killed Nambiar in self-defense. Sivaji saves her from clutches of law, exposes all activities of the trio and brings justice to his village.

== Cast ==
- Sivaji Ganesan
- K. R. Vijaya
- M. N. Nambiar
- V. K. Ramasamy
- Thengai Srinivasan
- Suruli Rajan
- Sachu
- Sripriya
- Major Sundarrajan

== Production ==
The film's shoot began on 14 December 1978.

== Soundtrack ==
The music was composed by M. S. Viswanathan, with lyrics by Muthulingam.

Song	Singers
"Puriyadha Velladu"	T. M. Soundararajan, P. Susheela
"Nee Indha Oorukkoru Pilai Allavo"	T. M. Soundararajan, Vani Jairam
"Muthumani Sirippirukka"	S. P. Balasubrahmanyam, P. Susheela
"Ada Rajangam"	S. P. Balasubrahmanyam, Chorus

== Critical reception ==
Thiraignani of Kalki gave the film a mixed review.
