= Pallandu Vaazhga =

1975 film by K. Shankar

- Theatrical release poster
- Directed by: K. Shankar
- Screenplay by: S. Maniyan; Vidwan V. Lakshmanan; Thamarai Manalan; Na. Pandurangan
- Story by: V. Shantaram
- Produced by: S. Maniyan; Vidwan V. Lakshmanan
- Starring: M. G. Ramachandran; Latha
- Cinematography: T. V. Rajaram
- Edited by: K. Shankar
- Music by: K. V. Mahadevan
- Production company: Udhayam Productions
- Release date: 31 October 1975
- Running time: 154 minutes
- Country: India
- Language: Tamil

Pallandu Vaazhga (pronounced [pallaːɳdu ʋaːɻɡa] transl. Long live!) is a 1975 Indian Tamil-language prison drama film directed and edited by K. Shankar. A remake of the 1957 Hindi film Do Aankhen Barah Haath, it stars M. G. Ramachandran and Latha. The film revolves around a prison warden (Ramachandran) who takes six paroled convicts (M. N. Nambiar, V. K. Ramasamy, Thengai Srinivasan, R. S. Manohar, P. S. Veerappa and Gundumani) to work on a dilapidated country farm in an attempt to rehabilitate them.

The script of Pallandu Vaazhga was written to be substantially different from Do Aankhen Barah Haath, by including references to politics in Tamil Nadu, adding new characters, and changing the fate of the lead character. The film was produced by S. Manian and Vidwan V. Lakshmanan, who also contributed to the screenplay alongside Thaamarai Manaalan, and Na. Pandurangan, while cinematography was handled by T. V. Rajaram. Shooting took place predominantly at Karnataka.

Pallandu Vaazhga was released on 31 October 1975. The film broke even and ran for over 100 days in theatres, but was not as successful as the original Hindi film.

== Plot ==
Rajan is a prison warden. He takes six paroled convicts – Bhaiyaravan (who stabbed a businessman), Mayandi (an ex-barber who knifed a customer), Mounkannu (who stabbed a man and his daughter), Sangili (who drowned his wife), David (who killed a policeman) and Kalayr (who killed his family) – to work with him on a dilapidated country farm, with the intention of rehabilitating them through hard work and kindly guidance. He is, however, given an ultimatum: he will be arrested if even one of the convicts attempts to escape.

The group comes across Saroja, an itinerant seller who they get attracted to, but she only gets close to Rajan, after he saves her from a bunch of goons. As Saroja is homeless, the six convicts plead with Rajan to let the girl stay with them and he subsequently agrees. When Sangili coincidentally runs into his long-lost family, he tearfully reunites with them. But they appear homeless, so Rajan allows them also to stay with him and the other convicts. This angers the other convicts who feel that Rajan did not give them freedom, compelling them to try killing him to escape.

Mayandi agrees to give Rajan a shave, plotting to cut his neck, and Rajan remains unaware of the threat to his life. Mayandi sees Rajan's magical eyes and gets hypnotised, forcing him to abort the idea of murder. The convicts who were attempting escape during this time see a statue of C. N. Annadurai and because they see Rajan's spirit in it, they get hypnotised and return. The escape attempt is seen by the other policemen around, leading to Rajan's stay in jail for one day. However, when they hear that the convicts have returned, Rajan is released and returns to duty. The convicts gradually reform and become attached to Rajan, who dreams of marrying Saroja, in his mother's presence.

One night, the convicts are invited to a bar by a corrupt businessman and Rajan is unaware of this. They return drunk and almost attack Rajan and Saroja. Rajan is not pleased with their status and commands them to kill him if that is what they want. Hypnotism and conscience again strike the convicts, causing them to drop their weapons. The next morning, the convicts fall at Rajan's feet and explain that the businessman forced them to drink; they earn the forgiveness of both Rajan and Saroja.

Later, the businessman orders that Rajan and his convicts surrender, or else their plantation and home will be destroyed. Rajan refuses, so the businessman sends his thugs and elephants to destroy everything in sight. However, Rajan and his men vigorously battle all the thugs and emerge victorious, while the local police capture the businessman and arrest him. Rajan, having successfully transformed the six convicts into reformed people, frees them and tearfully sees them off.

== Cast ==
- M. G. Ramachandran as Rajan
- Latha as Saroja
- M. N. Nambiar as Bhairavan
- V. K. Ramasamy as Mayandi
- Thengai Srinivasan as Mounkannu
- R. S. Manohar as Sangili
- P. S. Veerappa as David
- Gundumani as Kalayr
- V. S. Raghavan as Dharmaraj
- V. Gopalakrishnan as Rajan's superior
- Isari Velan as Rajan's secretary
- Pandari Bai as Rajan's mother
- Selvaraj as Veerappan
- Karikol Raju as a jail warden
- T. K. S. Natarajan as Villager
- MLA Thangaraj as MLA

== Production ==
Pallandu Vaazhga is a remake of V. Shantaram's 1957 Hindi film Do Aankhen Barah Haath. It was directed and edited by K. Shankar, and produced by S. Manian and Vidwan V. Lakshmanan under the banner Udhayam Productions. The screenplay was written by a team consisting of Manian, Lakshmanan, Thaamarai Manaalan, and Na. Pandurangan. Cinematography was handled by T. V. Rajaram. Unlike the original, this did not feature the male lead being killed, a measure which was taken after Ramachandran's character in an earlier film Paasam (1962) died and caused negative fan reactions, that resulted in the film's failure. It also featured a love interest for the male lead, unlike the original, and included many references to politics in Tamil Nadu. P. S. Veerappa, M. N. Nambiar and R. S. Manohar, who were regular villains in Ramachandran's films, played three of the six convicts. The other three were played by comedians Thengai Srinivasan and V. K. Ramasamy, and stunt actor Gundumani. Much of the film was shot at Kalasapura, Karnataka.

== Soundtrack ==
The soundtrack was composed by K. V. Mahadevan.

Track listing
No.	Title	Lyrics	Singer(s)	Length
1.	"Ondrae Kulamendru (Anbilaar)" (solo)	Pulamaipithan	K. J. Yesudas	3:20
2.	"Maasi Maasa"	Pulamaipithan	Vani Jairam	3:24
3.	"Poi Vaa Nadhi"	Na. Kamarasan	K. J. Yesudas, T. K. Kala	3:14
4.	"Sirens" (instrumental)	—	K. V. Mahadevan	1:19
5.	"Enna Sugam"	Pulamaipithan	K. J. Yesudas, P. Susheela	3:09
6.	"Sorgatthin Thirappuvaizha"	Pulamaipithan	K. J. Yesudas, Vani Jairam	3:19
7.	"The Tease" (instrumental)	—	K. V. Mahadevan	1:44
8.	"Ondrae Kulamendru (Anbilaar)" ((Reprise 1)	Pulamaipithan	K. J. Yesudas, chorus	3:17
9.	"Ondrae Kulamendru (Anbilaar)" (Reprise 2)	Pulamaipithan	K. J. Yesudas, chorus	3:17
10.	"Chella Papa"	Pulamaipithan	Vani Jairam	4:22
11.	"Ondrae Kulamendru (Anbilaar)" (Reprise 3)	Pulamaipithan	K. J. Yesudas, chorus	3:17
12.	"Puthiyathor Ulagam"	Bharathidasan	T. M. Soundararajan, Vani Jairam	3:29
13.	"Ondrae Kulamendru (Anbilaar)" (Reprise 4)	Pulamaipithan	K. J. Yesudas, chorus	3:17
Total length:				40:28

== Release ==
Pallandu Vaazhga was released on 31 October 1975. The film ran for over 100 days in theatres, but did not achieve the same success as the 1957 original. Critic V. A. K. Ranga Rao noted that the film broke even because of Ramachandran's star power.

== Critical reception ==
Ananda Vikatan stated that Pallandu Vaazhga is a film not only for Ramachandran fans, but a good film for everyone. Arthur Paris of Film World wrote, "Pallandu Vaazhga has lost the simplicity and charm of the original but has, in doing so, acquired much more mass appeal." Kanthan of Kalki praised the film primarily for the songs and cinematography.
