= Chiranjeevi (1984 film) =

- Theatrical release poster
- Directed by: K. Shankar
- Screenplay by: K.Shankar
- Story by: S. Jagadeesan
- Produced by: S. Jagadeesan
- Starring: Sivaji Ganesan; Sripriya; Jai Ganesh; Sarath Babu
- Cinematography: M. C. Shekar
- Edited by: K. Shankar
- Music by: M. S. Viswanathan
- Distributed by: Gururam Movies
- Release date: 17 February 1984
- Country: India
- Language: Tamil

Chiranjeevi is a 1984 Indian Tamil-language film, directed by K. Shankar and produced by S. Jagadeesan who also wrote the story. The film stars Sivaji Ganesan, Sripriya, Jai Ganesh and Sarath Babu. It was released on 17 February 1984, and failed at the box office.

== Plot ==
Chiranjeevi is a singer cum technician on a cruise ship. A murder related to smuggling happens in the ship and it is up to him to find out who did it while protecting the only witness.

== Cast ==
- Sivaji Ganesan as Chiranjeevi
- Sripriya
- Jai Ganesh
- Sarath Babu
- Sathyaraj
- Vijayakumar
- V. Gopalakrishnan
- Thengai Srinivasan
- Sowcar Janaki
- Manorama

== Production ==
The film was shot on a cruise ship for 15 days.

== Soundtrack ==
The music was composed by M. S. Viswanathan.

Song	Singers	Lyrics
"Anbenum Oliyaga Alayamaniyaga"	T. M. Soundararajan	Muthulingam
"Nilavu Vanthu Neerada"	Rajkumar, Janaki	Muthulingam
"Sondhama Illai"	T. M. Soundararajan	
