= Meenakshi Thiruvilayadal =

- Poster
- Directed by: K. Shankar
- Screenplay by: K. Shankar
- Story by: K. P. Arivanandham
- Produced by: N. S. Murty
- Starring: Vijayakanth; Radha
- Cinematography: M. C. Sekar
- Edited by: K. Shankar; V. Devan
- Music by: M. S. Viswanathan
- Production company: Lakshmi Ganapathy Combines
- Release date: 1 December 1989
- Running time: 140 minutes
- Country: India
- Language: Tamil

Meenakshi Thiruvilaiyadal (transl. Divine games of Meenakshi) is a 1989 Indian Tamil-language Hindu mythological film directed by K. Shankar and produced by N. S. Murty. The film stars Vijayakanth and Radha, with M. N. Nambiar and Sirkazhi G. Sivachidambaram in supporting roles. It was released on 1 December 1989.

== Plot ==
Goddess Parvati, on the instructions of Lord Shiva, visits Earth to fulfill her obligation towards Queen Kanchanamalai, one of her devotees.

== Cast ==
- Vijayakanth as Shiva / Lord Sundareswar
- Radha as Meenakshi / Tadadakai / Parvati
- M. N. Nambiar
- Sirkazhi G. Sivachidambaram as Agathiyar
- Delhi Ganesh
- Nagesh as Poojari
- Jai Ganesh as King Malayadhwaja Pandya
- Senthil as Kundotharan
- Shanmugasundaram as Lord Indra
- Sonia as Kokila
- R. S. Manohar
- Sumithra as Queen Kanchanamalai
- Ramya Krishnan as Urvashi
- Manorama as Annadavalli
- Captain Raju as Yatchan
- K. R. Vijaya as Arunthathi
- Usilai Mani as Chef
- Ennathe Kannaiah as Chef

== Soundtrack ==
The music was composed by M. S. Viswanathan.

Track listing
No.	Title	Lyrics	Singer(s)	Length
1.	"Meenakshi Kalyanam Vaibhogame"	K. P. Arivanantham	K. J. Yesudas, Vani Jairam
2.	"Angayarkanni"	'Vembattur' Krishnan	S. P. Balasubrahmanyam
3.	"Madhura Ponnukku"	Kamakodiyan	V. Kanagaraj
4.	"Deiveega Malarallava"	Muthulingam	Vani Jairam, K. S. Chithra
5.	"Sivamada Pooviada"	Tamil Nambi	Sirkazhi G. Sivachidambaram
6.	"Ulagathin Mudhal Mozhiyam"	K. P. Arivanantham	Vani Jairam
7.	"Malarkazhal"	K. P. Arivanantham	P. Susheela
