= Navagraha Nayagi =

- DVD cover
- Directed by: K. Shankar
- Written by: Vietnam Veedu Sundaram (dialogues)
- Screenplay by: K. Shankar
- Story by: K. Arivanandham
- Produced by: L. N. Nachiappan; L. N. Chidambaram; V. Rangasamy
- Starring: Vijayakanth; Nalini; K. R. Vijaya; Srividya
- Cinematography: M. C. Sekar
- Edited by: K. Shankar; V. Jayapal
- Music by: M. S. Viswanathan
- Production company: Visakam Arts
- Release date: 7 March 1985
- Running time: 139 minutes
- Country: India
- Language: Tamil

Navagraha Nayagi (transl. Goddess of nine planets) is a 1985 Indian Tamil-language devotional film, directed by K. Shankar. The film stars Vijayakanth, Nalini, K. R. Vijaya and Srividya. It was released on 7 March 1985.

== Plot ==
The film's narrative is framed around a devotional speech by Kirupanandha Variyar, who discusses the powers of the Navagraha deities and the goddess who controls them, Navagraha Nayagi. The first story revolves around Kalava Munivar, a sage who becomes arrogant and believes that he can control the Earth's activities after receiving blessings from Parashakti. To humble him, Narathar informs that the Navagrahas are the true controllers of fate and warns him that they will soon afflict him with leprosy. Kalava Munivar summons the 9 Navagrahas for remedy but they advise him to pray to Lord Parashakthi. Kalava Munivar performs a yagna to invoke the goddess, and to remove his pride, Parashakti appears and transforms him into a skeleton, making him realize the power of the Navagrahas.

To further illustrate the power of the Navagrahas, Parashakti shares the story of Draupadi, who was blessed by Suryan, the first Navagraha deity. Draupadi received an Akshaya Patra, a magical vessel that would never run out of food, as a gift from Suryan. However, Suryan warned that if the vessel were washed and set aside after noon, it would not produce food until the next day. Shakuni and Duryodhana, aware of this limitation, concoct a plan to get Pandavas cursed by Durvasa, a short-tempered sage. They intentionally send Durvasa to the Pandavas' hut in the afternoon, knowing that Draupadi would have washed the Akshaya Patra and would be unable to feed the sage. In desperation, Draupadi prays to Suryan, who in turn requests Krishna's help. Krishna, disguising himself as a beggar, arrives at the Pandavas' hut and asks for even a single grain of rice. After consuming the grain, Durvasa's hunger gets satiated, and he abandons his plan with the Pandavas. Krishna then reveals his true form to the Pandavas and shares the remedies to escape the wrath and receive the blessings of Suryan.

Narathar begins sharing the story about the 2nd and 3rd Navagrahas, Chandran and Angaragan. Narayana, a poor young man, attempts to take his own life due to his poverty. Narathar intervenes, foretelling that Chandran's blessings are about to manifest in Narayana's life, bringing him prosperity. But Narayana remains skeptical, and to get killed, he provokes the king, who is resting nearby, by kicking him. However, a snake emerges from the king's crown, making it seem like Narayana saved the king's life. The king, grateful, takes Narayana to his palace. Narayana's suicidal thoughts persist, and he abducts the princess, hoping the king will execute him. Instead, a crocodile appears, and Narayana is again credited for saving the princess. Meanwhile, the king's brother, the commander, plots to overthrow the king and to eliminate Narayana, sends a poisonous fruit through his courtier, Sivasamy. Narathar tries to warn Narayana, but he ignores him and gives the fruit to the king. The king faints after consuming the fruit, and Narayana is wrongly accused of attempted murder and sentenced to hang. Just as Narayana is about to be executed, Angargan's blessings take effect, transforming him into a brave warrior. He breaks free from his chains and rushes to the palace, and successfully saves the king from the commander. In return, Narayana is appointed as the new commander. Narathar appears, blessing Narayana and sharing the remedies to escape the wrath of Lord Chandran.

Narathar continues his tale, sharing the story of the 4th and 5th Navagrahas, Sukran and Budhan. Mayandi is a poor and ignorant woodcutter who stumbles upon precious stones while cutting a tree, which is a blessing from Lord Sukran as per his horoscope. Unbeknownst to Mayandi, the stones are valuable. An astrologer couple, Nadimuthu and Muthamma, befriend Mayandi and dress him up to pose as Mahendra Boopathi, the prince of Mangalapuri. They gift the precious stones to the king, who is impressed and arranges for Mahendra Boopathi to marry his daughter. However, the real king of Mangalapuri arrives and discovers Mayandi's true identity. Instead of exposing him, the king decides to play along, not wanting to ruin the situation. After the marriage, the princess discovers Mayandi's true identity, and the king orders his execution. Mayandi flees and takes refuge in a temple, where his horoscope shifts to Budhan, blessing him with intelligence. Mayandi begins to recite a beautiful song in praise of Lord Parashakti, showcasing his newfound literary prowess. The king and princess, now impressed, accept him as their son-in-law, rechristening him as Mahendra Boopathi.

Narathar shares the story of the 6th Navagraha, Brihaspati. Once Narathar visits Lord Brihaspati to inform his daughter Meenalochini's love affair with Prince Gireesan. However, Lord Brihaspati is hesitant to bless their union due to a defect in Meenalochini's horoscope, which predicts that her husband will die on the same day as their marriage. Moved by Gireesan's unwavering devotion, Brihaspati reluctantly agrees to the marriage. Narathar suggests a plan to overcome the fate: after the marriage, the couple should stay inside the temple for a day, and Brihaspati should keep a watchful eye on them throughout the night. Despite the danger appearing as a leopard, Brihaspati's vigilance saves the couple. At dawn, Narathar informs Brihaspati that the power of his blessings has rewritten Meenalochini's horoscope, ensuring Gireesan's safety. Through Narathar's words, Brihaspati comes to realize his powers and the impact of his blessings.

Narathar shares the story of the 7th Navagraha, Sani. Poonkothai is the daughter of Ramanuja Bhattar, a poor temple priest. Her engagement is fixed, but the groom's family demands a dowry of 1008 varahan, which Bhattar cannot afford. Motivated by his wife, Pankajam, Bhattar approaches his childhood friend, the king, who agrees to help. As Sani's transit period begins in Bhattar's horoscope, lasting 7.5 years, Lord Krishna intervenes on behalf of his devotee and requests Sani to shorten the period to 7.5 hours, which Sani accepts. During this brief period, Bhattar faces immense sufferings, like being accused of stealing the temple deity's gold chain, being beaten with a whip, and being removed from his temple duties. Heartbroken, Bhattar attempts to take his own life but is rescued by Sani, who shares the remedies to escape his wrath. Just as Bhattar's ordeal ends with Sani's transit out of Bhattar's horoscope, the king arrives to inform him that the chain was misplaced, clearing Bhattar's name.

Bhattar shares the story of the 8th and 9th Navagrahas, Rahu and Kethu, with the king. A conflict arises between Lord Shiva and Lord Parashakti, where Parashakti covers Shiva's eyes, angering him. So, Shiva curses Parashakti to take on a human form on earth, attributing it to the influence of Rahu in her horoscope. On Earth, Parashakti, now known as Kathyayini, resides in the Bagavathi Amman temple and uses her powers to heal others. A young devotee suffers from the effects of Rahu Dhosham, and Kathyayini vows to cure her. When she attempts to do so, Rahu appears as a cobra to stop her, but Kathyayini overpowers it. Despite Rahu's request not to intervene, Kathyayini takes on the girl's form and allows Rahu to bite her instead. Having protected the girl, Parashakti announces that the blessings and assistance of the gods will always be available to overcome the challenges posed by the Navagrahas. Kethu blesses the girl with the ability to speak. Kathyayini, still in her human form, hugs the lingam, but the people, unaware of her true identity, throw stones at her. However, upon realizing that she is indeed Lord Parashakti herself, they begin to worship her. Kathyayini appoints the cured girl to spread the message of Navagraha worship and its significance in everyone's life across the world.

The film concludes with Kirubanantha Variyar ending his sermon about Navagrahas and the supreme deity who governs them, Navagraha Nayagi.

== Cast ==
- K. R. Vijaya as Adhiparashakthi and Kathyayini
- Cho Ramaswamy as Narathar
- Srividya as Draupadi
- V. S. Raghavan as Durvasar
- Ennathe Kannaiah as Durvasar's disciple
- Omakuchi Narasimhan as Durvasar's disciple
- Vijayakanth as Narayana
- Anuradha as a princess
- V. Gopalakrishnan as a King
- Sivachandran as the King's brother
- Idichapuli Selvaraj as Sivasamy, a courtier
- Oru Viral Krishna Rao as a traditional healer
- Pandiyan as Mayandi (Mahendra Boopathi)
- Nalini as a Princess
- Vennira Aadai Moorthy as Nadimuthu, an astrologer
- Bindu Ghosh as Muthamma, Nadimuthu's wife
- MLA Thangaraj as a King
- Shanmugasundaram as Mangalapuri King
- Major Sundarrajan as Guru
- Suresh as Prince Gireesan
- Sasikala as Meenalochini
- Heran Ramaswamy as Sani
- Delhi Ganesh as Ramanuja Bhattar
- Viji as Poonkothai, Bhattar's daughter
- Kamala Kamesh as Pankajam, Bhattar's wife
- Srikanth as the King
- R. S. Manohar as Rahu
- Ranganath as Shiva
- Kirupanandha Variyar as the narrator

== Soundtrack ==
Soundtrack was composed by M. S. Viswanathan.

Track listing
No.	Title	Singer(s)	Length
1.	"Thennikkal"	Sirkazhi G. Sivachidambaram, Vani Jairam
2.	"Kaatrukku Paattu"	Vani Jairam
3.	"Ulagathukku"	B. S. Sasirekha, T. M. Soundararajan
4.	"Navagraha Nayagi"	Sirkazhi Govindarajan
5.	"Vaaranam Aayiram"	Vani Jairam
6.	"Santhana Kudamondru"	Vani Jairam, Rajkumar Bharathi

== Reception ==
Jayamanmadhan of Kalki felt director could have pruned the length to avoid the pace lagging.
