= Shehzada =

- Directed by: K. Shankar
- Written by: Rajinder Krishan
- Screenplay by: R. K. Dharmraj
- Story by: Ra. Ki. Rangarajan
- Produced by: Surinder Kapoor
- Starring: Rajesh Khanna; Raakhee
- Cinematography: Sharad Kawda
- Edited by: K. Shankar; G. Veluchamy
- Music by: R. D. Burman
- Distributed by: Amar Chhaya
- Release date: 24 November 1972
- Country: India
- Language: Hindi

Shehzada (lit. 'The Prince') is a 1972 Bollywood drama film produced by Surinder Kapoor and directed by K. Shankar, set during the British Raj. The film stars Rajesh Khanna and Raakhee as the lead pair and the supporting cast included Veena, Pandari Bai and Karan Dewan. The music was composed by R. D. Burman. This was remake of Tamil film Idhu Sathiyam (1963). The producer Surinder Kapoor quoted in an interview "Rajesh Khanna who played the title-role in Shehzada was truly of a princely disposition. He started shooting for me without ever discussing the price, saying that we could settle that once the film is made, he said and made banner S. K. International Films become an acknowledged company."

== Plot ==
Circa British rule in India, wealthy DIG of Police is approached by Devdutt, a poor freedom fighter, who would like his daughter, Janki, to marry the DIG's son, Ratan. The DIG and his wife Rajlaxmi refuse to have to do anything with Devdutt, but Ratan refuses to marry anyone else. They eventually relent and agree to this marriage. Shortly after the marriage, riots ensue between the police and freedom fighters, and as a result the DIG is killed. Rajlaxmi blames Devdutt for his death, and asks a pregnant Janki to leave her house. Unable to stand up for his wife, Ratan remains a silent spectator while his wife is thrown out. Janki goes to live with her father, who eventually passes away, and it is then Janki gives birth to a son, Rajesh. Years later, Rajesh has grown up, drives a truck, and is in love with a local shop-keeper, Chanda, who he would like to marry. Janki would like her son to go and meet his dad, and when Rajesh does so, Rajlaxmi arranges a pompous welcome for him with open arms, hoping that he will leave his mother and stay on with her. But Rajesh refuses to do this unless Rajlaxmi apologizes to Janki. An enraged Rajlaxmi refuses to do so, and asks Rajesh to leave. Rajesh and Chanda get married, and soon Chanda gets pregnant. Then the police arrest Rajesh, for which he may face several years in prison. He is held in the local police station. The truth does prevail, the real culprit is caught, and Rajesh is let go. He returns home to find out that everything is not the same anymore. Chanda has given birth a baby boy, and now lives with Rajlaxmi, and refuses to return home. Rajesh must now find out what compelled Chanda to leave Janki and go to live with Rajlaxmi.

== Cast ==
- Rajesh Khanna as Rajesh
- Raakhee as Chanda
- Madan Puri as Chanda's Maternal Uncle
- Veena as Rajlaxmi
- Karan Dewan as Ratan
- Pandari Bai as Janki
- Sunder as Nekiram
- Mohan Choti as Nandu

== Reception ==
Shehzada was one of the successful film of Rajesh Khanna when he was on peak and gained popularity among his fans.

== Soundtrack ==
All lyrics are written by Rajinder Krishan; all music is composed by Rahul Dev Burman.

| No. | Title | Singer(s) | Length |
|---|---|---|---|
| 1. | "Rimjhim Rimjhim Dekho Baras Rahi Hai" | Kishore Kumar, Lata Mangeshkar | 3.20 |
| 2. | "Na Jaeeyo, Na Jaeeyo, Chhod Ke Na" | Kishore Kumar, Lata Mangeshkar | 3.20 |
| 3. | "Thokar Mein Hai Meri Sara Zamana" | Kishore Kumar | 4.17 |
| 4. | "Pariyon Ki Nagari Se Aaya Chunnoo" | Lata Mangeshkar | 4.14 |
| 5. | "O Tere Atharoo Chun Levaan Main" | Mohammad Rafi | 5.00 |
