= Orey Vazhi =

1959 film by K. Shankar

- Theatrical release poster
- Directed by: K. Shankar
- Written by: Javar Seetharaman
- Produced by: Vasu Menon
- Starring: Prem Nazir; M. N. Rajam
- Cinematography: Thambu
- Edited by: K. Shankar, Narayanan
- Music by: R. Govardhanam
- Production company: Vasu Films
- Release date: 6 March 1959
- Running time: 16,398 ft
- Country: India
- Language: Tamil

Orey Vazhi (English: The Only Way) is a 1959 Indian Tamil language film directed by K. Shankar. The film stars Prem Nazir and M. N. Rajam. It was remade in Hindi as Shaadi (1962).

== Plot ==
Mohan is a brilliant lawyer. He was educated by his elder brother who sold the family properties to educate him. Mohan marries the daughter of a judge. Conflicts arise within the family and after much twists and turns the family is reunited.

== Cast ==
The list is adapted from The Hindu article.

- Prem Nazir
- M. N. Rajam
- S. V. Subbaiah
- Sriranjani, Jr.
- Tambaram N. Lalitha
- ‘Valayapathi’ G. Muthukrishnan
- S. Ramarao
- K. R. Chellam
- Pakkirisami
- K.M. Nambirajan
- C.P. Kittaan
- V.T. Kalyanam
- Thiruvengadam
- C.S. Desikan
- S.K. Ramaraj
- Raju
- Kuppusami
- Sivaraman

(Guest Artistes)

- T. S. Balaiah
- S. V. Sahasranamam

Dance Drama Sayee Subbulakshmi

== Production ==
The film marked the debut of N. Vasudeva "Vasu" Menon as a film producer. Earlier, he had worked in the production department of AVM Productions. He later established his own studio, Vasu Studios, under which the film was produced, with K. Shankar directing. However, shooting took place at Gemini Studios.

== Soundtrack ==
Music was composed by R. Govardhanam.

Song	Singer/s	Lyricist	Duration(m:ss)
"Anbum Aramum Uyir Ena"	P. Suseela	Kannadasan	03:31
"Theeyinar Sutta Pun...Ethanai Vazhigal"	C. S. Jayaraman	Kannadasan	03:13
"Piranthu Vandhadhum Orey Vazhi"	S. C. Krishnan	Kannadasan	03:28
"Kalvi Kalvi Endru Paadu"	M. L. Vasanthakumari & P. Leela	Kannadasan	
"Velli Meenum Thulli Aadhuthu"	A. M. Rajah & P. Suseela	Kannadasan	03:43
"Aandavanai Padaithavane...Pananaadhaa"	T. M. Soundararajan & S. C. Krishnan	Kannadasan	03:11
"Vettunda Kaiyum Veezhndhu"	P. Leela	Kannadasan	03:01
"Vanna Medaiyil Ennam"	T. S. Bagavathi	Kannadasan	03:31
"Vaanamennum Veediyile"	P. Susheela	Kannadasan	03:05
"Karuppu Kudaiyin Keezh"; Dance Drama	S. C. Krishnan & Group	Thanjai N. Ramaiah Dass	06:04

== Release and reception ==
Orey Vazhi was released on 6 March 1959. The film received positive reviews from a number of critics.
