= Manikantana Mahime =

- DVD cover
- Directed by: K. Shankar
- Written by: V. Swaminathan
- Screenplay by: Om Shakti Jagadish
- Produced by: V. Swaminathan
- Starring: Vishnuvardhan; Sarath Babu; Srikanth; Srinivasa Murthy
- Cinematography: Sathish
- Edited by: K. Shankar; Jayapal
- Music by: M. S. Viswanathan
- Production company: VSN Productions
- Release date: 20 September 1993
- Country: India
- Language: Kannada

Manikantana Mahime is a 1993 Indian Kannada-language film, directed by K. Shankar and produced by V. Swaminathan. The film stars Vishnuvardhan, Sarath Babu, Srikanth and Srinivasa Murthy. The film has musical score by M. S. Viswanathan. The film was dubbed into Tamil as Varuvaan Manikandan and was dubbed and partly reshot in Malayalam as Sabarimalayil Thanga Suryodayam with added sequences featuring Madhu and Shanthi Krishna.

== Cast ==
- Vishnuvardhan
- Sarath Babu
- Srikanth
- Srinivasa Murthy
- Srinath
- M. N. Nambiar
- Shivaram
- Upasane Seetharam
- M. D. Kaushik
- Jayapradha
- Tara
- Pandari Bai
- Mynavathi
- B. V. Radha
- Vaishali Kasaravalli
- M. S. Karanth
- Bharath Bhagavathar
