= Vetri Vinayagar =

- Poster
- Directed by: K. Shankar
- Screenplay by: K. Shankar
- Story by: K. Arivanantham
- Produced by: M. Sarojini Devi
- Starring: K. R. Vijaya; Radha Ravi; Urvasi; Nizhalgal Ravi; Delhi Ganesh
- Cinematography: N. K. Sathish
- Edited by: K. Shankar; V. Jayabal
- Music by: M. S. Viswanathan
- Production company: Ammu Creations
- Release date: 16 September 1996
- Running time: 136 minutes
- Country: India
- Language: Tamil

Vetri Vinayagar (transl. Victorious Ganesha) is a 1996 Indian Tamil language devotional film directed by K. Shankar and produced by M. Sarojini Devi. The film script was written by K. P. Arivanantham. Its music was composed by M. S. Viswanathan. The film stars K. R. Vijaya, Radha Ravi, Urvashi, Nizhalgal Ravi, and Delhi Ganesh. It was released on 16 September 1996.

== Cast ==
- Master Sridhar
- K. R. Vijaya as Goddess Parvathi
- LIC Narasimhan as Lord Shiva
- Delhi Ganesh as Prohit
- Srividya as Bhuvaneswari, Prohit Wife
- Neelu as Gurukulam Head
- Nizhalgal Ravi as Parthiban
- Urvashi as Ponni
- Jai Ganesh as Ambalam
- Vadivukkarasi as Meenakshi
- Thara as Mallika
- Radha Ravi as King Kajamuka Sooran
- Geetha as Priyamala
- Shanmuga Sundaram as Goundalya Muni
- Sangeeta as Asirikai
- Master Sridhar as Narathar
- Peeli Sivam as Lord Indran/Devendran
- Lalitha as Pusa Natchathiram
- Gundu Kalyanam as Saadhu
- Thayir Vadai Desikan as Saadhu 2

== Soundtrack ==
Music was by M. S. Viswanathan and lyrics were written by Kamakodiyan.

Song	Singer	Length
"Jaganatha Vigneswara"		
"Madhane Rathiyae Ennidayae"	S. P. Balasubrahmanyam, K. S. Chithra	04:46
"Omkara Rupathil Porulanavan"	S. P. Sailaja	03:35
"Intha Mattukkaran Pattu Paduvan"	Swarnalatha	04:45
"Poothathellam Kaichathu"	Swarnalatha	05:07
"Nithya Sumangali"	Vani Jairam	03:57
