= Panathottam =

1963 film by K. Shankar

- Theatrical release poster
- Directed by: K. Shankar
- Screenplay by: Pasumani
- Story by: B. S. Ramiah
- Produced by: G. N. Velumani
- Starring: M. G. Ramachandran; B. Saroja Devi
- Cinematography: Thambu
- Edited by: K. Narayanan
- Music by: Viswanathan–Ramamoorthy
- Production company: Saravana Films
- Release date: 11 January 1963
- Running time: 135 minutes
- Country: India
- Language: Tamil

Panathottam (transl. Garden of Money) is a 1963 Indian Tamil-language action drama film directed by K. Shankar. The film stars M. G. Ramachandran and B. Saroja Devi. It was released on 11 January 1963.

== Plot ==
Selvam is arrested on a false charge of passing counterfeit bills. He escapes and tries to put his hands on the real authors, that is, the leader of the band of the counterfeiters to be exonerated. His quest gets complicated when Natarajan, a firm policeman, dashes in his pursuit, convinced of his guilt.

== Cast ==
- M. G. Ramachandran as Selvam
- B. Saroja Devi as Kala
- Sheela as Meena
- S. V. Subbaiah as Ponnambalam
- M. N. Nambiar as Chidambaram
- S. A. Ashokan as Inspector Natarajan
- M. V. Rajamma as Thangamma
- C. Lakshmi Rajyam
- Nagesh as C. K. Ramu
- Karikol Raju as Raju
- A. Veerappan as Ramu's friend
- V. P. S. Mani
- Thirupathisamy

== Production ==
Panathottam is named after the book of the same name by C. N. Annadurai. Saroja Devi, despite limited availability, agreed to act in the film and finished her portions within 9 days. This was the first film where Ramachandran and Nagesh acted together, although they do not share any scenes. The climax began filming one day at 7:00am, and ended the next day at 7:00pm.

== Soundtrack ==
The music was composed by Viswanathan–Ramamoorthy, with lyrics by Kannadasan. The song "Pesuvathu Kiliya" is based on Bilaskhani Todi raga. It contains multiple references to Ramachandran's vital stats through its lyrics "Paaduvadhu kaviyaa illai, paarivallal magana; Seranukku uravaa senthamizhar nilava"; the line "Seranukku uravaa" refers to Ramachandran's place of birth Kerala, "paari vallal" references his perceived generous nature, and "senthamizhar" gives emphasis to Ramachandran's Tamil pride.

Song	Singers	Length
"Enna Than Nadakkum"	T. M. Soundararajan	03:18
"Javvathu Medai"	T. M. Soundararajan, P. Susheela	04:30
"Oru Naal Iravil"	P. Susheela	03:12
"Oruvar Oruvarai"	T. M. Soundararajan, L. R. Eswari	04:37
"Panathottam"	T. M. Soundararajan	04:15
"Pesuvathu Kiliya"	T. M. Soundararajan, P. Susheela	04:06
