= K. Shankar =

Indian film editor, screenwriter and director

- Born: Kannan Shankar; 17 March 1926; Kunnesscuri, Madras Presidency, British India
- Died: 5 March 2006 (aged 79)
- Occupations: Film director, screenwriter, Film editor
- Parent(s): Father : Kannan; Mother : Rukmani

Kannan Shankar (17 March 1926 - 5 March 2006) was an Indian film editor, screenwriter and director. He directed more than 80 films in Indian languages including Tamil, Telugu, Malayalam, and Kannada and Hindi. He also directed a film in Sinhala.

== Film career ==
Shankar started his film career as an editor Assistant at Central Studios, Coimbatore in 1939 and later moved to Pakshiraja Studios. He later became a successful editor at AVM Studios, before moving into film direction. Shankar got the opportunity to direct his first ever film, a Sinhala film named Doctor (1956) under the AVM banner. He continued to direct a few other films especially Bhookailasa (Kannada) and Bhookailas (Telugu) in 1958. Shankar decided to move on so he came out of AVM and directed his first outside film Orey Vazhi (1959).

He made several films with M. G. R including Panathottam (1963), Kalangarai Vilakkam (1965), Chandrodayam (1966) and Kudiyirundha Koyil (1968). Shankar was also credited with creating M. G. R in his own production, Adimai Penn (1969). Pallandu Vaazhga (1975), Uzhaikkum Karangal (1976) and Indru Pol Endrum Vaazhga (1977) were other films that were released.

He gave blockbuster film Aalayamani (1962) for Sivaji Ganesan and went on to direct in other films like Andavan Kattalai (1964), Anbu Karangal (1965), Miruthanga Chakravarthi (1983), Chiranjeevi (1984), Ezhuthatha Sattangal (1984) and Raja Rishi (1985).

He gave superhits Hindi films like Rajkumar (1964), Sachaai (1969) and Shehzada (1972).

He has also directed Vijayakanth in five films such as Navagraha Nayagi (1985), Nambinar Keduvathillai (1986), Velundu Vinaiyillai (1987), Thambi Thanga Kambi (1988) and Meenakshi Thiruvilayadal (1989).

His continuous making of devotional movies such as Sabarimalayil Thanka Sooryodayam (1992), Saranam Saranam Manikanta (1993), Manikantana Mahime (1993) and Vetri Vinayagar (1996).

== Filmography ==
Year	Film	Credited as		Language	Notes
Year	Film	Director	Editor	Language	Notes
1953	Ladki	✗	✓	Hindi	
1954	Sangham	✗	✓	Telugu	
1954	Penn	✗	✓	Tamil	
1954	Sri Kalahastiswara Mahatyam	✗	✓	Telugu	
1956	Doctor	✓	✓	Sinhala	
1956	Nagadevatha	✓	✓	Tamil	
1958	Bhookailasa	✓	✓	Kannada	
1958	Bhookailas	✓	✓	Telugu	Dubbed in Tamil as Baktha Ravana
1959	Orey Vazhi	✓	✓	Tamil	
1959	Sivagangai Seemai	✓	✓	Tamil	
1960	Kavalai Illaadha Manithan	✓	✓	Tamil	
1960	Kairasi	✓	✓	Tamil	
1961	Arappavan	✓	✗	Malayalam	
1962	Jhoola	✓	✓	Hindi	
1962	Paadha Kaanikkai	✓	✓	Tamil	
1962	Aadi Perukku	✓	✓	Tamil	
1962	Aalayamani	✓	✓	Tamil	
1963	Panathottam	✓	✓	Tamil	
1963	Idhu Sathiyam	✓	✓	Tamil	
1963	Bharosa	✓	✓	Hindi	
1963	Ezhai Pangalan	✓	✗	Tamil	
1964	Andavan Kattalai	✓	✓	Tamil	
1964	Rajkumar	✓	✓	Hindi	
1965	Anbu Karangal	✓	✗	Tamil	
1965	Panchavarna Kili	✓	✓	Tamil	
1965	Kalangarai Vilakkam	✓	✓	Tamil	
1966	Chandrodayam	✓	✓	Tamil	
1966	Gowri Kalyanam	✓	✗	Tamil	
1968	Kudiyirundha Koyil	✓	✓	Tamil	
1968	Kallum Kaniyagum	✓	✗	Tamil	
1969	Adimaippenn	✓	✓	Tamil	
1969	Sachaai	✓	✓	Hindi	
1970	Koi Ghulam Nahi	✓	✓	Hindi	
1971	Parde Ke Peechey	✓	✓	Hindi	
1972	Bandagi	✓	✓	Hindi	
1972	Shehzada	✓	✓	Hindi	
1974	Chhote Sarkar	✓	✓	Hindi	
1975	Pallandu Vazhga	✓	✓	Tamil	
1975	Raja	✓	✓	Hindi	
1976	Uzhaikkum Karangal	✓	✓	Tamil	
1977	Indru Pol Endrum Vaazhga	✓	✓	Tamil	
1977	Sthree Janmam	✓	✓	Malayalam	
1978	Varuvan Vadivelan	✓	✓	Tamil	
1978	Vayasu Ponnu	✓	✓	Tamil	
1978	Sundarimaarude Swapnangal	✓	✓	Malayalam	
1978	Prathyaksha Deivam	✓	✓	Malayalam	
1978	Kungumam Kathai Sollugiradhu	✓	✓	Tamil	
1979	Srungara Ramudu	✓	✓	Telugu	
1979	Suprabatham	✓	✓	Tamil	
1979	Neelakadalin Orathile	✓	✓	Tamil	
1981	Bala Nagamma	✓	✓	Tamil	Dubbed in Telugu with same name Dubbed in Hindi as Jadu Nagari
1981	Devi Dharisanam	✓	✓	Tamil	
1981	Deiva Thirumanangal	✓	✓	Tamil	Director of story "Srinivasa Kalyanam"
1982	Erattai Manithan	✓	✓	Tamil	
1982	Thaai Mookaambikai	✓	✓	Tamil	
1983	Miruthanga Chakravarthi	✓	✓	Tamil	
1984	Chiranjeevi	✓	✓	Tamil	
1984	Ezhuthatha Sattangal	✓	✓	Tamil	
1985	Navagraha Nayagi	✓	✓	Tamil	
1985	Raja Rishi	✓	✓	Tamil	
1986	Nambinar Keduvathillai	✓	✓	Tamil	
1986	Aayiram Kannudayaal	✓	✓	Tamil	
1987	Velundu Vinaiyillai	✓	✓	Tamil	
1987	Mupperum Deviyar	✓	✓	Tamil	
1988	Thambi Thanga Kambi	✓	✓	Tamil	
1989	Meenakshi Thiruvilayadal	✓	✓	Tamil	
1992	Sabarimalayil Thanka Sooryodayam	✓	✓	Malayalam	
1993	Saranam Saranam Manikanta	✓	✓	Telugu	
1993	Manikantana Mahime	✓	✓	Kannada	Dubbed in Hindi as Vishnuputra
1993	Swamy Ayyappa Sabarimalai	✓	✓	Kannada	
1993	Nallathe Nadakkum	✓	✓	Tamil	
1996	Vetri Vinayagar	✓	✓	Tamil	Dubbed in Hindi as Jai Ganesh Deva

== Death ==
Shankar died due to heart attack at his residence on 5 March 2006 at the age of 79. He was married to Kamakshi Ammal and had six children. The names of his children were Vijayalakshmi, Rukmani, Radha, Sivaprasad, Sasitharan and Ganesan. Sivaprasad made his directorial debut with Kalyana Rasi (1991).
