= Ezhuthatha Sattangal =

- Theatrical release poster
- Directed by: K. Shankar
- Screenplay by: K. Shankar
- Story by: Cochin Haneefa
- Produced by: K. Shivaprasad
- Starring: Sivaji Ganesan; Jaishankar; M. N. Nambiar; Prabhu; Urvashi
- Cinematography: M. C. Sekar
- Edited by: K. Shankar; V. Jeyapal
- Music by: Ilaiyaraaja
- Production company: Shivshankar Creations
- Release date: 15 August 1984
- Running time: 147 minutes
- Country: India
- Language: Tamil

Ezhuthatha Sattangal (transl. Unwritten laws) is a 1984 Indian Tamil-language film directed by K. Shankar, starring Sivaji Ganesan, Jaishankar and M. N. Nambiar. It is a remake of the Malayalam film Aarambham (1982). The film was released on 15 August 1984.

== Cast ==
- Sivaji Ganesan as Nazeer
- Prabhu as Shankar
- Jaishankar as Justice Thiyagarajan
- M. N. Nambiar as Farooq
- Srividya as Saradha
- Nalini as Noorajahan
- Urvashi as Meena
- Sarath Babu as Dr. Basheer
- Rajesh as Gopinath
- R. S. Manohar as Sebastian
- Sivachandran as Jambi
- Thengai Srinivasan as Velu Thambi
- Oru Viral Krishna Rao
- Nagaraja Chozhan
- Anuradha
- Vijayalakshmi
- Vijayarekha
- K. Vijayan ( Guest appearance)
- V. Gopalakrishnan as Dr. Abraham (Guest Appearance)
- LIC Narasimhan

== Production ==
The film was launched at Prasad Studios along with song recording.

== Soundtrack ==
The soundtrack was composed by Ilaiyaraaja, with lyrics by Pulamaipithan.

| Track | Singer(s) |
|---|---|
| "Aalankatti Maamalaiyaam" | S. P. Balasubrahmanyam, S. P. Sailaja |
| "Ezhuthaatha Sattangal" | Malaysia Vasudevan |
| "Kannuku Azhagana Maapillai" | Malaysia Vasudevan, Vani Jairam |
| "Then Kulathile Kulikkava" | S. Janaki |
| "Vanthen Maathiram" | P. Jayachandran, Vani Jairam, Chorus |

== Critical reception ==
Balumani of Anna praised the acting of Sivaji Ganesan and other actors, Super Subbarayan's stunt choreography, Ilaiyaraaja's music and Shankar's direction.
