= Chandrodayam =

- Theatrical release poster
- Directed by: K. Shankar
- Based on: It Happened One Night
- Produced by: G. N. Velumani
- Starring: M. G. Ramachandran; J. Jayalalithaa
- Cinematography: Thambu
- Edited by: K. Narayanan
- Music by: M. S. Viswanathan
- Production company: Saravana Films
- Release date: 27 May 1966
- Country: India
- Language: Tamil

Chandrodayam (transl. Moonrise) is a 1966 Indian Tamil-language romantic comedy film directed by K. Shankar. The film stars M. G. Ramachandran and J. Jayalalithaa, with M. N. Nambiar and Nagesh in supporting roles. It was inspired by the 1934 American film It Happened One Night, and released on 27 May 1966.

== Plot ==
Devi, an innocent heiress, runs away from her home, the Selvamani Estate, the day before her engagement, thereby creating a scandal within her family, in particular, for her father, Zamindar Ponnambalam. Being away, abandoned to herself, Devi is saved at the last minute by a reporter, Chandran, who decides to accommodate her at his home until he is able to find her a new home.

Chandran is the news reporter for the newspaper named Dinakkavartchi. Duriothanan, the editor of the newspaper, is an unscrupulous man with no regard for genuine news presentation, and is always in favour for sensationalising news, even if it means concealing the truth. The two very often disagree. Chandran is helped in his quest by his friend, the newspaper's photographer, Alwar.

Chandran wants at all costs to help another young woman, Kamala, wounded cruelly by life since her birth. She had previously been a victim of a predator, the rich Paranthaman. Chandran puts everything in its place by uniting Kamala with Paranthaman and he himself marrying Devi, with the blessings of the elders from both the families. Duriothanan regrets his misdeeds and asks Chandran to start a new newspaper and name it as he wants. The newspaper is named Chandrodayam, the first issue carrying the wedding news of Chandran and Devi.

== Cast ==
- M. G. Ramachandran as Chandran
- J. Jayalalithaa as Devi
- M. R. Radha as Duriothanan
- M. N. Nambiar as Paranthaman
- Pandari Bai as Lakshmi
- S. A. Ashokan as Ponnambalam
- C. K. Nagesh as Alwar
- C. R. Manorama as Ahalya
- Bharathi as Kamala
- S. N. Lakshmi as Maheshwari
- Kuladeivam Rajagopal as Ekambaram

== Production ==
Chandrodayam was inspired by the 1934 American film It Happened One Night. It was produced by G. N. Velumani of Saravana Films, directed by K. Shankar, photographed by Thambu and edited by K. Narayanan. The film was launched on new moon day at Sathya Studios. The climax fight sequence between M. N. Nambiar and M. G. Ramachandran was shot with the use of only one light source: a rolling, broken small table lamp.

== Soundtrack ==
The soundtrack is composed by M. S. Viswanathan. The songs "Chandrodayam Oru Pennanatho", "Buddhan Yesu" and "Kaasikum Pogum Sanyasi" were well received. The song "Kaasikum Pogum Sanyasi" is based on Yadhukulakambhoji raga, and "Chandrodayam Oru Pennanatho" is based on Hamir Kalyani.

Track listing
No.	Title	Lyrics	Singer(s)	Length
1.	"Pudhiyadhor Ulagam Seivom"	Bharathidasan	Sirkazhi Govindarajan, chorus	3.16
2.	"Buddhan Yesu Gandhi"	Vaali	T. M. Soundararajan	5.19
3.	"Kettimelam Kottura Kalyanam..."	Vaali	P. Susheela	4.01
4.	"Kaasikku Pogum Sanyasi..."	Vaali	T. M. Soundararajan, Sirkazhi Govindarajan	5.23
5.	"Engiruntho Aasaikal..."	Vaali	T. M. Soundararajan, P. Susheela	3.49
6.	"Chandrodayam Oru Pennanatho..."	Vaali	T. M. Soundararajan, P. Susheela	5.46
7.	"Pudhiyadhor Ulagam Seivom..." (Reprise)	Bharathidasan	Sirkazhi Govindarajan, chorus	0.19

== Release and reception ==
Chandrodayam was released on 27 May 1966. Jayalalithaa won the Tamil Nadu Cinema Fan Award for Best Actress.

== Bibliography ==
- Sundararaman (2007) [2005]. Raga Chintamani: A Guide to Carnatic Ragas Through Tamil Film Music (2nd ed.). Pichhamal Chintamani. OCLC 295034757.
