= Velundu Vinaiyillai =

- Poster
- Directed by: K. Shankar
- Written by: K. P. Arivanandham; Vietnam Veedu Sundaram (dialogues)
- Screenplay by: K. Shankar
- Produced by: S. Valliammai
- Starring: Vijayakanth; Ambika; M. N. Nambiar; Jai Ganesh
- Cinematography: M. C. Sekar
- Edited by: K. Shankar; V. Devan
- Music by: M. S. Viswanathan
- Production company: Om Muruga Arts
- Release date: 12 March 1987
- Running time: 133 minutes
- Country: India
- Language: Tamil

Velundu Vinaiyillai is a 1987 Indian Tamil-language devotional film, directed by K. Shankar and produced by S. Valliammai. The film stars Vijayakanth, Ambika, M. N. Nambiar and Jai Ganesh. It was released on 12 March 1987.

== Cast ==
- Vijayakanth as Arun
- Ambika as Karpagam
- M. N. Nambiar as Raghunatha Bhoopathy
- Jai Ganesh as Jagadeesan
- Delhi Ganesh
- Senthil as Gnanam
- Madhumohan
- R. Shankaran
- Typist Gopu as Fake Advocate
- Vadivukkarasi as Tara

== Production ==
The filming began at Palani with the shoot of song "Velundu".

== Soundtrack ==
The music was composed by M. S. Viswanathan “Muthukkumaranai” 6+ mins long song, Singing and dancing the glory of each Padai Veedu. Susheela sang this extremely difficult & challenging composition by MSV. It deserved National/State award but Nomination was not sent on time.

Song	Singers	Lyrics	Length
"Pothaicha"	Chithra	Vaali	04:55
"Velundu"	Vani Jayaram	Kannadasan	05:02
"Unavinilae"	K. J. Yesudas	Tamil Nambi	04:34
"Kaayatha"	Deepan Chakravarthy	Sri Thavathiru Sankaradas Swamigal	04:32
"Kaatrin"	Vani Jayaram		04:57
"Muthukkumaranai"	P.Susheela	K.P.Arivanandam	04:32
