= Kalangarai Vilakkam =

1965 film by K. Shankar

- Theatrical release poster
- Directed by: K. Shankar
- Story by: Ma. Lakshmanan
- Produced by: G. N. Velumani
- Starring: M. G. Ramachandran; B. Saroja Devi
- Cinematography: Thambu
- Edited by: K. Narayanan
- Music by: M. S. Viswanathan
- Production company: Saravana Films
- Distributed by: Emgeeyar Pictures
- Release date: 28 August 1965
- Running time: 148 minutes
- Country: India
- Language: Tamil

Kalangarai Vilakkam (transl. Lighthouse) is a 1965 Indian Tamil-language action thriller film directed by K. Shankar, starring M. G. Ramachandran and B. Saroja Devi. It is based on the American film Vertigo (1958). The film was released on 28 August 1965.

== Plot ==
Ravi, a leading lawyer, travels to Mahabalipuram to meet his doctor friend Gopal. On the way, he sees a girl running to the top of the lighthouse to jump off from there. Ravi intervenes on time and saves the girl but astonished when she blabbers about names of ancient Tamil Pallava king Narasimhavarman I and calls herself as Sivagami (character from the historical novel Sivagamiyin Sapatham), and she wants to commit suicide because her lover King Narasimha Pallava left her. Ravi understands that something is wrong, and he tells her that he is none other than Narasimha Pallavan, her lover. Convinced by it, the girl returns with him. Ravi finds out that the girl is named Neela who is a patient of his friend Gopal, and she is mentally ill. Neela is a history student and while she was doing her research about Narasimha Pallava she got into a minor accident, and she became insane. Ravi continues his drama as King Narasimha Pallava, Sivagami's (i.e. Neela's) lover. He stays in her house to help his friend to cure her along with his friend, Neela's father who is bedridden and Neela's paternal uncle Nagarajan.

Nagarajan wants to get rid of the insane Neela by a suicide drama and kill his own brother so that he can inherit his brother's property. He emotionally blackmails his girlfriend Gowri and her younger sister Malliga, a doppelgänger of Neela, to act like Neela so that he can carry out his mission. Gowri unwillingly supports Nagarajan as he promises to marry her when his mission is successfully accomplished. Neela gets back her memories and shows signs of recovery from her mental illness, which shocks Nagarajan. Ravi and Neela fall in love with each other, and Neela's father approves of their marriage. One day when the lovers are spending time, Nagarajan interrupts and kidnaps Neela, and he replaces her with Malliga. Ravi smells something strange with Neela's (Malliga's) behavior but cannot understand why. Malliga is misunderstood as Neela by Nagarajan's henchmen, and they try to kidnap her again. Ravi fights with them and tries to save Malliga, but Malliga gets injured on her back while trying to avert a knife stab on Ravi. One night, Malliga tricks Ravi and Gopal and brings them to the lighthouse as per instructions by Nagarajan. Malliga does everything, but she is interrupted and knocked unconscious by Nagarajan's henchman. In the meantime, Nagarajan throws Neela from the top of the lighthouse, killing her. Ravi, Gopal and everyone believe Neela committed suicide out of her mental instability. Ravi is devastated by Neela's death. As he and Gopal bid goodbye to Neela's father, they find him dead too. Nagarajan succeeds in making everyone believe that his brother died of heartbreak from his daughter's death.

Gopal consoles Ravi and takes him to a dance program. Both of them are shocked to see a lookalike of Neela. Initially both of them misunderstand that Neela is alive but eventually understand that she is Malliga, a dancer. Not still convinced by the reply, Ravi peeps into Malliga's room and shocked to see the injury at her back side which he mistakes that she is Neela, and she is acting. Gopal and Ravi make multiple attempts to find out what happened on the fateful day, but in vain. Malliga is moved by the Ravi's love failure story, and she consents to marry him. Nagarajan is shocked about this, and he wants to stop this marriage, but Malliga marries Ravi in secret. Gowri makes Malliga promise that she won't reveal anything about the fateful day to her husband, or else Nagarajan will kill Ravi. Malliga who is already confused about the happenings on that day promises that she won't do that.

Ravi confuses Malliga by acting like an insane person who is still unable to come out of the trauma of his lover's death. He pretends to faint one day, and Malliga is bewildered by Ravi's behavior. As per the plan, Gopal advises Malliga to take him to Mahabalipuram so that he can be cured. Malliga is shocked about Mahabalipuram, and she cries to her sister about her helplessness to break her promise. Nagarajan is infuriated when he hears about Malliga taking Ravi to Mahabalipuram. He tries to shoot both of them, but Ravi fights with him and saves himself and Malliga.

Ravi and Gopal trick Malliga at the lighthouse to reveal the truth, but Malliga is still adamant to open her mouth. She finally confesses about how she acted like Neela on insistence of Nagarajan, but she has no idea about how Neela died. When Ravi refused to believe, she runs to the top of the lighthouse to commit suicide. Gowri reveals all the truth to Ravi and kills herself by consuming poison. Nagarajan gets angry about his plans got exposed and tries to kill all of them. Out of anger, he reveals how he killed both Neela and his brother and make it look like a suicide. Cops who eavesdropped his confession catch him red-handed and arrest him. Malliga is also arrested as she helped Nagarajan. Nagarajan gets death sentence and Malliga is sentenced to three months prison as she did not reveal the truth in spite of knowing everything even though she has no part in killing of Neela. After her sentence, Ravi and Malliga start their new life.

== Cast ==
- M. G. Ramachandran as Ravi, the leading lawyer; King Narasimma Pallavar in the song "Ponnezhil poothathu"
- B. Saroja Devi as Neela, Malliga, Sivagami in the song "Ponnezhil poothathu"
- M. N. Nambiar as Nagarajan
- Nagesh as Vasu
- V. Gopalakrishnan as Dr. Gopal
- K. D. Santhanam as Neela's father
- A. Veerappan as Deva
- S. M. Thirupadhiswamy as Thirumalai
- G. Sakunthala as Gowri
- Manorama as Mohini

== Soundtrack ==
The music was composed by M. S. Viswanathan. The song "Pallavan Pallavi" is set in the Neelambari raga.

| Song | Singers | Lyrics | Length |
|---|---|---|---|
| "Ennai Marandhadhaen" | P. Susheela | Panchu Arunachalam | 03:16 |
| "Ponnezhil Pootadu" | T. M. Soundararajan & P. Susheela | Panchu Arunachalam | 06:14 |
| "Sange Muzhangu" | Sirkazhi Govindarajan, P. Susheela & chorus | Bharathidasan | 04:57 |
| "Kattru Vaanga" | T. M. Soundararajan | Vaali | 04:19 |
| "Enna Uravo" | T. M. Soundararajan | Vaali | 04:57 |
| "Pallavan Pallavi" | T. M. Soundararajan | Vaali | 03:48 |

== Production ==
During the filming of the “Pallavan Pallavi” song, B. Saroja Devi was reportedly suffering from severe stomach pain and asked her assistant, Nawaz Khan, to inform director K. Shankar that she would be unable to perform. Shankar was known for his strict working style and was reputed to demand the performance he envisioned even from stars like MGR and Sivaji Ganesan. His rule was that once actors arrived on set, they were expected to complete their work rather than leave. Remembering a similar incident during the making of Aandavan Kattalai, when writer-actor Javar Seetharaman experienced chest pain and Shankar treated him with a traditional Kerala Ayurvedic oil remedy, he suggested the same treatment to Saroja Devi. He explained that MGR’s call sheet was ending that day and that completing the song was crucial to finishing the film on schedule.

Saroja Devi reportedly left the decision to Shankar, saying, “Do whatever you think is best.” He then asked her to apply the Ayurvedic oil to her abdomen, massage the area and tightly bind it with a cloth before having her perform the entire song sequence. Interestingly, the severe pain she was experiencing resulted in a visibly sorrowful expression throughout the song, which happened to suit the mood of the scene perfectly. Saroja Devi later mentioned in an interview that the treatment had actually provided considerable relief from her abdominal pain, making this an unusual instance where an on-set remedy inadvertently became part of the performance itself.

== Release and reception ==
Kalangarai Vilakkam was released on 28 August 1965, and distributed by Emgeeyar Pictures. T. M. Ramachandran of Sport and Pastime criticised K. Shankar's direction, saying it was "not up to the mark" and also noted "In some of the places, his treatment is naive and bears marks of hurried work". Kalki appreciated Thambu's cinematography, particularly his capturing of Mysore and Mamallapuram.
