= M. N. Nambiar =

Indian actor

- Born: Mannjheri Narayanan Nambiar; 7 March 1919; Cannanore, Kerala, India
- Died: 19 November 2008 (aged 89); Chennai, Tamil Nadu, India
- Occupation: Actor
- Years active: 1935—2008
- Spouse: Rukmani (m. 1946)
- Children: 3

Mannjheri Narayanan Nambiar (7 March 1919 – 19 November 2008) was an Indian actor who predominantly worked in Tamil cinema, renowned for his portrayals of villainous characters. He also appeared in a few Malayalam, Telugu, Hindi and English films during his career.

== Early life ==
Manjeri Narayan Nambiar was born on 7 March 1919 in a Ambalavasi Nambiar family at Kandakkai near Mayyil in Cannanore (Kannur) in the North Malabar region of Kerala. He was the son of Kelu Nambiar and Kalyani Amma. His father died while Nambiar was still a child. He later moved to live and study in Ooty with his elder sister and brother-in-law.

== Film career ==
Nambiar made his cinematic debut in a comic role in Bhakta Ramadas (1935), at the age of 16.

In 1944, he performed the role of Rajaguru in the play Kaviyin Kanavu, written by S. D. Sundaram to such perfection that his reputation as villain came to be well established. Nambiar soon signed up with Jupiter Films as a studio artiste and played a comedian in the film Vidyapathi (1946). He married Rukmani the same year.

His next film was A. S. A. Sami's Rajakumari (1947), which featured his friend M. G. Ramachandran as hero. Nambiar then played the lead role along with S. V. Subbaiah in Kanjan (1947). Then followed Abhimanyu (1948), Mohini (1948) and Velaikari (1949).

Soon, Nambiar developed a reputation as a dependable actor and major banners like Jupiter and progressive theatre companies enlisted his services. He is also known to have played multiple roles in one film, as the central character in Digambara Samiyar (1950). He played the much acclaim in many a mythological or period drama which was the norm of storytelling in the 50s and early 60s.

Though he acted mostly in Tamil films, he had starred in Hindi, Malayalam and Telugu movies. A lone English film, The Jungle (1952), and a handful of Malayalam films including Thadavara (1981) and Kolilakkam (1981) also formed part of the actor’s filmography. Nambiar also worked on the small screen in serials like Oviyam, Velan and Alaigal.

Nambiar steadily rose and became the industry's “bad” man — his performance in Annaiyin Aanai (1958), Thennilavu (1961), Padagotti (1964), Enga Veettu Pillai (1965), Aayirathil Oruvan (1965), Ragasiya Police 115 (1968) and Raman Ethanai Ramanadi (1970) is unforgettable. During this time, he also essayed character roles in films such as Pasamalar (1961). Despite stiff competition from the likes of P. S. Veerappa, S. A. Ashokan, R. S. Manohar and a host of others, Nambiar managed to retain his place in the industry. His portrayal of an old man in C. V. Sridhar's Nenjam Marappathillai (1963) was classic. Manjeri Narayanan Nambiar slipped so effectively into the skin of the characters he played that fans of the heroes he opposed on screen continued to nurture their hatred for him long after they walked out the theatres.

But then, the 70’s was a period when Nambiar’s popularity began to wane. Once MGR made a complete transition to politics, Nambiar was bereft of his plum villainous roles. To top it off, onscreen baddies were turning suave and younger and Nambiar gradually found himself being sidelined.

After becoming popular in Tamil films, he started his own drama troupe Nambiar Nataka Mandram, which staged many plays.

As long as MGR and Sivaji played the hero, Nambiar was a favourite choice to play the villain. However, in his later years, he began taking up character roles that once again proved his acting talents. K. Bhagyaraj’s Thooral Ninnu Pochchu (1982) and S. Shankar’s Gentleman (1993) are among his best. His other projects include Thai Veedu (1983), Paalam (1990), Yajaman (1993), Poove Unakkaga (1996), Moovendhar (1998), Sharja To Sharja (2001), Baba (2002), Winner (2003), Arasatchi (2004), Anbe Aaruyire (2002) and Sudesi (2006).

== Personal life ==
Friends and associates of M.N.Nambiar described him as kind, witty, and disciplined. He was a vegetarian, teetotaler, and fitness enthusiast. He was also an ardent devotee of Sabarimala Sri Ayyappan. He has had a long association with Sabarimala Temple, where he made trips to for almost 60 years and brought many colleagues; this has led to him being called Maha Guruswamy. His colleagues noted that he died during the famous Sabarimala season and it may be due to the blessing of his Lord.

== Partial filmography ==
=== Tamil films ===
Year	Film	Role	Notes
1935	Bhaktha Ramadas		
1946	Vidyapathi	Narayana Bhagavathar	
1947	Rajakumaari	Bahu	
1947	Kanjan	Velappan	
1948	Abhimanyu	Lakkanan	
1948	Mohini		
1949	Velaikaari	Moorthi and Yogi Hariharadas	
1950	Manthiri Kumari	Rajaguru	
1950	Thigambara Samiar	Chokkalingam Pillai	Lead role
1951	Marmayogi	Nallathambi	
1951	Devaki	Gopu	
1951	Sarvadhikari	Mahavarman	
1952	Kanchana	Manohar	
1952	Kalyani	Moorthi	
1953	Naam		
1953	Petra Thai	Shankar	
1953	Devadas	Bhagavan	
1953	Azhagi		
1954	Mangalyam	Gopi	
1955	Kaveri	Gnananandar	
1955	Missiamma	David	
1955	Nalla Thangai		Lead role
1955	Pennarasi	Minister Vijayasimman	
1955	Kanavane Kankanda Deivam	Veerasenan	
1955	Doctor Savithri	Krishnamoorthi	
1955	Guna Sundari	Second son-in-law	
1956	Naan Petra Selvam	Sundar	
1956	Tenali Raman	Kannan	
1956	Amara Deepam	Sukumar	
1956	Rambaiyin Kaadhal	Narada	
1957	Pathini Deivam		
1957	Makkalai Petra Magarasi	Kannan	
1957	Mayabazar	Shakuni	
1957	Vanangamudi	Narendran	
1957	Rajarajan	Udhayachandhran	
1957	Karpukkarasi	Jagaveeran	
1957	Thangamalai Ragasiyam	King Adithan	
1957	Iru Sagodharigal	Vasudevan	
1957	Ambikapathy	Ottakoothar	
1958	Kanniyin Sabatham		
1958	Bhooloka Rambai	Puththi Sigamani	
1958	Uthama Puthiran	Naganathan	
1958	Annaiyin Aanai	Balu	
1958	Illarame Nallaram	Gopu	
1958	Sarangadhara	Mahadevan	
1958	Nadodi Mannan	Pingalan	
1959	Thanga Padhumai	Baladevar	
1959	Kalyana Parisu	Raghu's father	
1959	Penn Kulathin Pon Vilakku		
1959	Bhaaga Pirivinai	Mani	
1960	Baghdad Thirudan	Hyder / Chinna Sarkar	
1960	Raja Bakthi	General	
1960	Ellarum Innattu Mannar	Thirumeni	
1960	Veerakkanal	Raghu Devan	
1961	Arasilangkumari	Vetrivelan[	
1961	Naaga Nandhini		
1961	Thirudathe	Ponnambalam / Duraisingam	
1961	Pasamalar	Bhaskar	
1961	Nallavan Vazhvan	Inspector Madhavan	
1961	Then Nilavu	Raj-2	
1962	Raani Samyuktha	Muhammad Ghori	Guest appearance
1962	Nichaya Thamboolam	Pattusamy	
1962	Madappura	Kannan	
1962	Kavitha		
1963	Panathottam	Chidambaram	
1963	Chitor Rani Padmini	Malik Kafur	
1963	Kalai Arasi	Dheenan	
1963	Nenjam Marappathillai	Zamindar	
1963	Needhikkuppin Paasam	Muthaiya	
1963	Parisu	Viswam	
1963	Annai Illam	Rathnam	
1963	Ezhai Pangalan		
1964	Vettaikkaran	Mayavan	
1964	En Kadamai	Shankar	
1964	Thozhilali	Velu	
1964	Padagotti	Neelamagam	
1964	Thaayin Madiyil		
1965	Enga Veetu Pillai	Gajendran	
1965	Aayirathil Oruvan	Pirate captain	
1965	Kalangarai Vilakkam	Nagarajan	
1965	Kanni Thai	Estate manager's son	
1965	Thazhampoo	Mohan	
1965	Aasai Mugam	Varatha, alias Varathan	
1966	Naan Aanaiyittal	Velaiya	
1966	Muharasi	Duraisamy	
1966	Nadodi	Jambu	
1966	Chandrodayam	Paranthaman	
1966	Thali Bhagyam	Namchivayam	
1966	Thanippiravi	Sub-inspector Sundaram	
1966	Parakkum Pavai	Rangasamy	
1966	Petralthan Pillaiya	Mani	
1966	Mani Magudam	Raja Guru / Veera Mahendran	
1967	Arasa Kattalai	Amudha's guardian	
1967	Raja Veetu Pillai	Anand	
1967	Kaavalkaaran	Maruthachalam	
1967	Vivasayee	Pannaiyar Velupandiyan	
1968	Ragasiya Police 115	Inspector Kumar and Krishnan	
1968	Thirumal Perumai	Chola King	Cameo appearance
1968	Kudiyirundha Koyil	Boopathy / Nagappan	
1968	Harichandra	Vishvamitra	
1968	Pudhiya Bhoomi	Kangeyan	
1968	Thillana Mohanambal	Maharaja of Madhanpur	
1968	Enga Oor Raja	Rajangam	
1968	Lakshmi Kalyanam	Suruttu Sundaram Pillai	
1969	Anbalippu	Vasudevan	
1969	Subha Dinam	Narayana Iyer	
1969	Nil Gavani Kadhali	Gang leader	
1969	Kaaval Dheivam	Ananth	
1969	Kanne Pappa	Inspector James	
1969	Gurudhatchanai	Singapur Singaram	
1969	Anjal Petti 520	Nagarajan	
1969	Deiva Magan	Ananth	
1969	Sivandha Mann	Diwan	
1970	En Annan	Nayagam	
1970	Thalaivan	Sangili	
1970	Raman Ethanai Ramanadi	Minor Rajarathnam	
1970	Paadhukaappu	Vinayagam	
1971	Thirudatha Thirudan		
1971	Thangaikkaaga	Moorthy / Prakash	
1971	Kulama Gunama	Nallakannu	
1971	Praptham	Raju	
1971	Savaale Samali	Rajavel	
1971	Aathi Parasakthi	Ashtavadhana Kaala Kandathana Munivar	
1971	Oru Thaai Makkal	Rathnam	
1972	Kurathi Magan	Jambilingam	
1972	Naan Yen Pirandhen	Rajan	
1972	Dharmam Engey	Marthandan	
1972	Kannamma		
1972	Idhaya Veenai	Annamalai	
1972	Raman Thediya Seethai	Babu Bhairavan	
1972	Annamitta Kai	Selvaraj	
1973	Rajaraja Cholan	Bala Devar	
1973	Ulagam Sutrum Valiban	one of Bairavan's henchmen	
1973	Ponnunjal	Ponnan	
1973	Pattikaattu Ponnaiya	Pannaiyar Paramasivam	
1973	Rajapart Rangadurai	Somasundaram	
1974	Thaai	Kumar	
1974	Netru Indru Naalai	Rathnam (the false)	
1974	Urimaikural	Duraisamy	
1974	Sirithu Vazha Vendum	Cheater in gambling	
1975	Ninaithadhai Mudippavan	Mohan	
1975	Naalai Namadhe	Ranjith	
1975	Mannavan Vanthaanadi	Punyakodi	
1975	Pallandu Vazhga	Bhairavan	
1976	Needhikku Thalaivanangu	Sathiyamoorthy	
1976	Satyam	Sokkanathan	
1977	Indru Pol Endrum Vaazhga	Guruviah	
1977	Meenava Nanban	Arun	
1978	Punniya Boomi	Nagalingam	
1978	Varuvan Vadivelan	Velagiri	
1978	Vayasu Ponnu		
1978	Mudi Sooda Mannan	Rajaguru	
1978	En Kelvikku Enna Bathil	Sivaraman	
1979	Neeya?	Appu Kuttan	
1979	Thirisoolam	Chakravarthi	
1979	Nadagame Ulagam		
1979	Vetrikku Oruvan	thirajulu	
1980	Ratha Paasam	Arjun Das	
1980	Guru	Head of the anti-social group	
1981	Ram Lakshman	Chandrasekar	
1981	Lorry Driver Rajakannu	Jaganath	
1981	Garjanai	Mr. Mithra	
1982	Oorukku Oru Pillai		
1982	Parvaiyin Marupakkam	Viswanath	
1982	Thooral Ninnu Pochu	Kusthi Vaathiyaar	
1982	Sangili	Tiger Dayanidhi / Lion, leader of a smuggling ring	
1982	Thaai Mookaambikai	Durga's father	
1983	Thai Veedu	Rajasingam	
1983	Sandhippu	Vedagiri	
1983	Dowry Kalyanam	Rowthar	
1983	Saatchi		
1983	Miruthanga Chakravarthi	Neelakandan Pillai	
1984	Naan Mahaan Alla	G.M.K	
1984	Vetri	Commissioner Chandrasekharan	
1984	Pozhuthu Vidinchachu		
1984	Tharaasu		
1984	Vaazhkai	Rajalingam	
1984	Simma Soppanam	Nagarajan	
1984	Ezhuthatha Sattangal	Farooq	
1984	Nyayam		
1984	Iru Medhaigal	Rajalingam	
1985	Naan Sigappu Manithan	Commissioner Amarnath	
1985	Needhiyin Nizhal	Krishna Prasad	
1985	Nermai	Seetharam	
1985	Eetti		
1985	Thanga Mama 3D		
1985	Raja Rishi	Sage Vashista	
1985	Puthiya Theerpu	Namachivayam	
1986	Karimedu Karuvayan		
1986	Nambinar Keduvathillai		
1986	Mella Thirandhathu Kadhavu	Noorjahan's father	
1986	Aayiram Kannudayaal		
1987	Valayal Satham		
1987	Vilangu	International smuggler	
1987	Velundu Vinaiyillai	Raghunatha Bhoopathy	
1987	Enga Ooru Pattukaran	Kallampattiyan	Guest appearance
1987	Anjatha Singam	Max	
1987	Krishnan Vandhaan	Rangarajan	
1987	Jallikattu	Dheenadalayan	
1987	Uzhavan Magan	Marudhamalai Gounder	
1988	Sakkarai Panthal		
1988	Thambi Thanga Kambi	Thyagu	
1988	Manaivi Oru Mandhiri		
1988	Nallavan	Guru and Raja's father	
1988	Enga Ooru Kavakkaran	Pandimuni Devar	
1988	Thappu Kanakku		
1989	Thaai Naadu	Saleem Bhai	
1989	Paattukku Oru Thalaivan	Veluchami	
1989	Paandi Nattu Thangam	Captain Raghu	Special appearance
1989	Meenakshi Thiruvilayadal		
1990	Pulan Visaranai	DGP	
1990	Paattali Magan		
1990	Paalam	SP Izhavenil	
1990	Jagathalaprathapan	John Frederick	
1990	Kalyana Rasi	Murali's father	
1990	Periya Veetu Pannakkaran		
1990	Sathyam Sivam Sundaram		
1990	Avasara Police 100	Prakash	
1991	Sami Potta Mudichu		
1991	Kumbakarai Thangaiah		
1991	Enga Ooru Sippai		
1991	Captain Prabhakaran	Police Commissioner S. Ramanathan	
1991	Kaaval Nilayam	Andhavar	
1991	Maanagara Kaaval	IG Jayaprakash	
1992	Thanga Manasukkaran	Sadha Swamy	
1992	Chembaruthi	Raja Rathnam	
1992	Nadodi Pattukkaran	Thevar Ayya	
1992	Annai Vayal		
1992	Thai Mozhi	Church Father	
1992	Kaviya Thalaivan	Damodaran	
1992	Villu Pattukaran	Nambiyappan	
1993	Yejaman	Kathavarayan	
1993	Ezhai Jaathi	Iyer	
1993	Thanga Pappa	Adaikalam	
1993	Sakkarai Devan	Sarasu's grandfather	
1993	Gentleman	Ramesh's father	
1993	Nallathe Nadakkum	Vikraman	
1994	Sethupathi IPS	Ramarathnam	
1994	Paasamalargal	Swamy Uncle	
1994	Thai Maaman	Arivudai Nambi, Chief Minister of Tamil Nadu	
1994	Periya Marudhu	Bhai	
1995	Karuppu Nila	Nandhini's father	
1995	Kattumarakaran	Vaidehi's grandfather	
1995	Raasaiyya	Swamy	
1996	Poove Unakkaga	Sadhasivam	
1996	Aavathum Pennale Azhivathum Pennale	Deena Dayalan	
1997	Kathirunda Kadhal		
1997	Vallal	Dharmarasu	Guest Appearance
1997	Pasamulla Pandiyare	Nesamani	
1997	Nattupura Nayagan	Kuppusamy	
1997	Thambi Durai		
1998	Moovendhar	Nagappan	
1998	Poonthottam	Sundari's grandfather	
1999	Endrendrum Kadhal	Sethupathi	
1999	Rojavanam		
1999	Pooparika Varugirom	Narayanan	
2001	Vinnukkum Mannukkum		Cameo Appearance
2002	Varushamellam Vasantham	Paramasivam	
2002	Baba	Baba's maternal uncle	
2003
2003	Anbe Anbe	Mahendra Bhoopathy	
2003	Winner	Velayutham	
2004	Arasatchi	Iyer	
2005	Anbe Aaruyire	Father of Memories	
2006	Sudesi	Sudesi's grandfather	

=== Malayalam films ===
Year	Film	Role	Notes
1973	Jesus	Judas	
1978	Thacholi Ambu	Ittiri	
1979	Pancharatnam		
1979	Maamaankam	Thanayanjeri Pandhya Perumal	
1979	Avesham	Shekhar	
1980	Chandra Bimbam		
1980	Shakthi	Vikraman	
1981	Thadavara	Madhavan	
1981	Kolilakkam		
1982	Chilanthivala	Shekhar	
2001	Sharja To Sharja	Valiya Kappithan	

=== Other language films ===
Year	Film	Role	Language	Notes
1935	Bhaktha Ramadas		Hindi	
1951	Ek Tha Raja		Hindi	
1952	Kanchana		Telugu; Malayalam	
1952	Jungle	Mahaji	English	
1953	Kanna Talli	Shankar	Telugu	
1955	Vijaya Gowri		Telugu	
1956	Devta	Veersen	Hindi	
1973	Errakota Veerudu		Telugu	
1976	Maa Daivam	Bhairavudu	Telugu	
1985	Aatmabalam	Puligolla Varahavataram	Telugu	
1993	Manikantana Mahime		Kannada	
1996	Ramudochadu	Bhusayya	Telugu	

== Television ==
- Oviyam
- Velan
- Alaigal
- The TV serial Avalukkendru Oru Idam in Doordharshan Madras is his first Television debut. The television serial produced by Lakshmi and Lakshmi Creations fetched him the Mylapore Academy Award 1991 for Best Actor in Character Role.

== Death ==
Nambiar suffered from bacterial infection and died at his residence in Chennai on 19 November 2008. He was survived by his wife Rukmani, 2 sons — one, a senior BJP leader Sukumar Nambiar, and the other, Mohan Nambiar, a prominent businessman based in Coimbatore and a daughter, Sneha Nambiar who was married to actor Sarath Babu. His eldest son Sukumar Nambiar died on 8 January 2012 aged 63 and later, his wife Rukmani also died on 11 April 2012 aged 82.

== Tributes ==
- P. Vasu (Director) :

"If there was anyone who could act with both the top heroes (Sivaji Ganesan and M. G. R.) of Tamil cinema then, it was Nambiar. At one point, directors could not think of anyone else but him to play villain."

- Srikanth (Actor) :

"This is a very big loss...you cannot find a human being like him easily."

- Manorama (Actress) :

"He was a villain only when the camera got rolling...otherwise, he'd always keep us laughing with his ready wit,"

- K. Raman (Make-up man) :

"In ‘Nenjam Marappadillai,’ he plays a really old man...the makeup would take hours together, but he would be extremely patient. His skin was flawless and almost pink...he took great care of his health."

- Sundaram (Dance master) :

"Nambiar swami was responsible for taking most of us in the industry to Sabarimalai"

- J. Jayalalithaa (Former Tamil Nadu CM) :

"I have acted with him in several films. He would be very jovial and enthusiastic on the sets. When one worked with him, one forget the burden of work. He was very fond of me and I always had great regard and respect for him. His passing away is a great loss indeed."
