= Idhu Sathiyam =

1963 film directed by K. Shankar

- Theatrical release poster
- Directed by: K. Shankar
- Screenplay by: Maa. Lakshmanan
- Story by: Ra. Ki. Rangarajan
- Produced by: G. N. Velumani
- Starring: S. A. Ashokan; K. Chandrakantha
- Cinematography: Thambu
- Edited by: K. Narayanan
- Music by: Viswanathan–Ramamoorthy
- Production company: Saravana Films
- Distributed by: Emgeeyar Pictures
- Release date: 30 August 1963
- Running time: 161 minutes
- Country: India
- Language: Tamil

Idhu Sathiyam (transl. This is a promise) is a 1963 Indian Tamil-language drama film directed by K. Shankar. The film stars S. A. Ashokan and K. Chandrakantha. It was released on 30 August 1963. The film was remade in Hindi as Shehzada (1972).

== Cast ==
List adapted from Thiraikkalanjiyam – Part 2.

Male cast

- S. A. Ashokan
- T. S. Balaiah
- T. S. Durairaj
- Nagayya
- G.K. Nagesh
- S. V. Ramadas
- A. Veerappan

Female cast

- K. Chandrakantha
- P. Kannamba
- Sri Ranjani
- Manorama
- Sivakami
- Mathavi
- Hema Malini (special appearance in the song "Singari")

== Production ==
The film was produced by G. N. Velumani under his own banner Saravana Pictures and was directed by K. Shankar. The story was written by Ra. Ki. Rangarajan. Screenplay and dialogues were written by Ma. Lakshmanan. Cinematography was handled by Thambu while the editing was done by K. Narayanan. Balu was in charge of art direction while the choreography was done by S. M. Rajkumar. R. P. Sarathy did the still photography and the film was shot at Studio Neptune. Hema Malini, who later became a leading Bollywood actress, made her acting debut with this film, appearing as a dancer in the song "Singari". It was also shot in Gobichettipalayam.

== Soundtrack ==
Music was composed by the duo Viswanathan–Ramamoorthy and the lyrics were penned by Kannadasan. The song "Saravana Poigaiyil" which became hugely popular was initially supposed to be penned by Vaali; however the film's producer Velumani felt Vaali's talent would be wasted by writing a single track to which Viswanathan agreed and chose Kannadasan who penned the number. The song "Manam Kaniyadha" is set in Khamas raga.

Song	Singer/s	Length
"Singaara Therukku"	Sirkazhi Govindarajan & L. R. Eswari	04:28
"Manam Kanivaana Andha"	T. M. Soundararajan & P. Susheela	05:24
"Saravana Poikaiyil"	P. Susheela	04:30
"Kaadhalile Patru Vaiththaal"	P. Susheela	04:57
"Kunguma Pottu Kulunguthadi"	P. Susheela, S. Janaki	06:08
"Saththiyam Ithu Saththiyam"	T. M. Soundararajan	04:32

== Reception ==
T. M. Ramachandran wrote in Sport and Pastime, "Producer G N Velumani and director K Shankar have shaped the film in a praise-worthy manner There are of course flaws here and there but the good points outweigh the bad". Kanthan of Kalki said there was nothing special about the screenplay.
