= K. R. Vijaya =

Indian actress

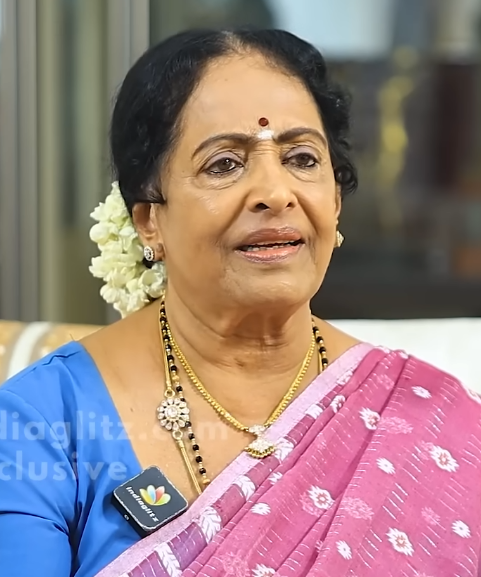
- Vijaya during an interview
- Born: Deivanayaki Ramachandran Rao; 30 November 1948 (age 77); Thrissur, Kerala, India
- Other names: Punnagai Arasi; The 'Iron Lady' actress who charmed with her honeyed words
- Occupation: Actress
- Years active: 1963–present
- Works: Full list
- Spouse: Madathil Velayuthan (m. 1966; died 2016)
- Children: 1
- Parent(s): Ramachandran Rao; Kalyani
- Relatives: K. R. Savithri; K. R. Vatsala

Deivanayaki, better known by her stage name K. R. Vijaya, is an Indian actress who has featured in Tamil, Malayalam, Telugu and Kannada films. She started her career in 1963 and has been acting for more than six decades in South Indian cinema. The actress has worked with almost all the stalwarts of South Indian cinema and has played many key roles.

== Early life ==
Vijaya was born as Deivanayaki, the eldest child of Telugu parents Ramachandra Rao and Kalyani in Chennai, Tamil Nadu. Her father was in the army and her mother was a housewife. She has a younger brother, Narayanan and three younger sisters, K. R. Vatsala, K. R. Savithri and Radha. She had her primary education at Government Higher Secondary School, Adyar, Chennai. Her father wanted her to become an actress since he was himself acting in M. R. Radha's drama troupe at the time after retiring from army. She made her film debut with Karpagam in 1963. She was the first ever actress to own a private jet.

== Personal life ==
She married a businessman, Madathil Velayuthan in 1966. Her husband was the CEO of Sudarshan trading company and a movie producer. The couple have a daughter Hemalatha (born 1967). M. Velayuthan died on 26 March 2016, aged 82.

== Career ==
Vijaya's first break itself was as a heroine in her debut film Karpagam (1963). Her notable films include Idhaya Kamalam (1965), Odayil Ninnu (1965), Saraswathi Sabatham (1966), Selvam (1966), Nenjirukkum Varai (1967), Iru Malargal (1967), Namma Veettu Deivam (1970), Dheerga Sumangali (1974), Thangappathakkam (1974), Thirisoolam (1979) and Ithiri Poove Chuvannapoove (1984). In the year 1967 she had a distinct record of starring in 18 films in lead role besides giving birth to her daughter in the same year.

She has appeared opposite top heroes like MGR, Sivaji Ganesan and Gemini Ganesan.

She was called the "Punnagai Arasi" (Queen of the smiles - in Tamil) by her fans at a function held in Trichy. Vijaya was always the first choice of directors to portray the roles of Hindu goddesses due to her looks which was similar to conventional depictions. Apart from her essaying the role of Goddess Shakti in Mel Maruvathoor Arpudhangal (1986), she essayed the Mariamman avatar in the film Mahasakthi Mariamman (1986) and Kandhan Karunai (1967). K R Vijaya reminisces about her first director "who gave her life" K. S. Gopalakrishnan who also directed her in her 100th film Nathayil Muthu (1973). Apart from acting in many films, she has also acted in Raja Rajeswari and Kudumbam, two teleserials.

Vijaya returned to a mythological role in Sri Rama Rajyam (2011). K.R Vijaya also played Kausalya for the first time in Bapu's mythological extravaganza. She has acted in over 500 films.

== Awards ==
Satyabama College

- 2009 - Doctorate

Nandi Awards

- 1989 - Nandi Special Jury Award for Sutradharulu

Tamil Nadu State Film Awards

- 1967 - Best Actress for Iru Malargal
- 1970 - Best Actress for Namma Veetu Dheivam

Filmfare Awards South

- 1974 - Filmfare Special Award - South for Dheerga Sumangali
- 2004 - Lifetime Achievement Award

Kerala State Film Awards

- 1984 - Second Best Actress - Ithiri Poove Chuvannapoove

Kerala Film Critics Association Awards

- 2013: Chalachitra Rathnam Award

Janmabhoomi Television Awards

- 2018: Best Character Actress - Sathyam Sivam Sundaram

Other Awards

- 2013: Nagi Reddy Memorial Awards
- 2017: Congress Managalir Awards
- 2019: Nakshathira Sathanaiyalar 2019

== Television serials ==
Year	Title	Channel	Language	Role	Notes
1993	Adhiparasakthi	Rajshri Tamil	Tamil	Mahadevi	debut
1994	Madisar Maami	Sun TV	Tamil		
1998	Kudumbam	Sun TV	Tamil		
	Oorvashi	Gemini TV	Telugu		
	Pettamma	Doordarshan	Malayalam	Ambalika	
2000	Daivathin Makkal	Surya TV	Malayalam		
2000–2003	Mangai	Sun TV	Tamil	Mangai	Lead
2003	Vikramadithian	Sun TV	Tamil	Paatti	
2004	Anandham	Sun TV	Tamil	Vijay's mother	Special Appearance
2004–2006	Raja Rajeswari	Sun TV	Tamil	Abhirami Amma	
2005-2007	Sthree 2	Asianet	Malayalam		
2007–2008	Shree Krishna Leela	Asianet	Malayalam	Kururamma	
2008–2009	Namma Kudumbam	Kalaignar TV	Tamil	Satya	
2009	Shree Mahabhagavatham	Asianet	Malayalam	Kunthi Devi	
2010–2012	Devimahathmyam	Asianet	Malayalam	Devakiyamma	Bilingual in Tamil as Adiparashakthi
2012-2013	Sabarimala Shri Dharmashashtha	Asianet	Malayalam	Savithri	
2012–2016	Bhairavi Aavigalukku Priyamanaval	Sun TV	Tamil	Chintamani	
2014	Sreekrishna vijayam	Janam TV	Malayalam	Devakiyamma	
2016–2018	Sathyam Sivam Sundaram	Amrita TV	Malayalam	Valliamma	
2020	Ithikkarapakki	Surya TV	Malayalam	pakki's umma	
2021	Anbe Vaa	Sun TV	Tamil	Ulganayagi	Special Appearance
2021-2022	Kanakanmani	Surya TV	Malayalam	Puthanmadathil Kadambariyamma	
2023	Madhanakamarajan	YouTube	Malayalam	Indràpuri muthassi	Web serial
2024	Siragadikka Aasai	Star Vijay	Tamil		
2023–2025	Malikappuram: Apathbandhavan Ayyappan	Asianet	Malayalam	Devakiyamma	
