= Sivaji Ganesan filmography =

Sivaji Ganesan in the film Neethi (1972)

The filmography of Sivaji Ganesan (1928–2001) consists predominantly of Tamil-language films apart from some Telugu, Malayalam, Kannada, and Hindi films. He is the only actor to have played the lead role in over 280 films in Tamil cinema.

== Films ==
Year	Film	Role	Language	Notes	Ref.
1951	Nirabarathi	—N/a	Tamil	Dubbing voice for Mukkamala Krishna Murthy	
1952	Parasakthi	Gunasekaran	Tamil		
1952	Panam	Umapathy	Tamil		
1953	Paradesi	Ananth	Telugu		
1953	Poongodhai	Ananth	Tamil		
1953	Thirumbi Paar	Paranthaman	Tamil		
1953	Anbu	Selvam	Tamil		
1953	Kangal		Tamil		
1953	Pempudu Koduku	Mohan	Telugu		
1953	Manidhanum Mirugamum	Madhavan	Tamil		
1954	Manohara	Manoharan	Tamil		
1954	Illara Jothi	Manohar	Tamil		
1954	Andha Naal	Rajan	Tamil		
1954	Kalyanam Panniyum Brahmachari	Ambalavanan (alias) Ambalam	Tamil		
1954	Manohara	Manohara	Telugu		
1954	Thuli Visham	Prince Suryakaanthan	Tamil		
1954	Koondukkili	Jeeva (alias) Jeevanandham	Tamil		
1954	Thookku Thookki	Sundarangathan	Tamil		
1954	Edhir Paradhathu	Sundar	Tamil		
1955	Kaveri	Vijayan	Tamil		
1955	Mudhal Thethi	Sivagnanam	Tamil		
1955	Modala Thedi		Kannada	Guest appearance	
1955	Ulagam Palavitham	Arunagiri	Tamil		
1955	Mangaiyar Thilakam	Vasudevan (Vasu)	Tamil		
1955	Koteeswaran	Chandar	Tamil		
1955	Kalvanin Kadhali	Muthaiya	Tamil	25th Film	
1956	Naan Petra Selvam	Shekar	Tamil		
1956	Nalla Veedu		Tamil		
1956	Naane Raja	Prince Villalan	Tamil		
1956	Tenali Raman	Thenali Raman	Tamil		
1956	Pennin Perumai	Nagu	Tamil		
1956	Raja Rani	Raja	Tamil	In This Film, He has got 'Nadigar' Thilagam'	
1956	Amara Deepam	Ashok	Tamil		
1956	Marma Veeran	Soldgier	Tamil	Guest appearance	
1956	Vazhvile Oru Naal	Kannan / Salimkaboor Bai	Tamil		
1956	Rangoon Radha	Dharmalinga Mudaliyar	Tamil		
1957	Makkalai Petra Magarasi	Sengodan	Tamil		
1957	Vanangamudi	Chithrasenan	Tamil		
1957	Pudhaiyal	Durai	Tamil		
1957	Manamagan Thevai	Vijayakumar	Tamil		
1957	Thangamalai Ragasiyam	Gajendran	Tamil		
1957	Rani Lalithangi	Azhagapuri Prince Azhagesan	Tamil		
1957	Ambikapathy	Ambikapathy	Tamil		
1957	Baagyavathi	Somu	Tamil		
1958	Bommala Pelli	Suryam	Telugu		
1958	School Master	Vasu	Kannada	Guest appearance	
1958	Uthama Puthiran	Parthiban and Vikraman (Note: Ganesan played two roles in this film.)	Tamil		
1958	Pathi Bakthi	Pandiyan	Tamil		
1958	Sampoorna Ramayanam	Bharathan	Tamil		
1958	Bommai Kalyanam	Kannan	Tamil		
1958	Annaiyin Aanai	Sankar and Ganesh	Tamil		
1958	Sarangadhara	Sarangadhara	Tamil	50th Film	
1958	Sabaash Meena	Mohan	Tamil		
1958	Kathavarayan	Kathavarayan	Tamil		
1959	Thanga Padhumai	Manivannan	Tamil		
1959	Naan Sollum Ragasiyam	Karunakaran	Tamil		
1959	Thayapola Pillai Noolapola Selai		Tamil	Guest appearance	
1959	Veerapandiya Kattabomman	Veerapandiya Kattabomman	Tamil		
1959	School Master		Hindi	Guest appearance	
1959	Maragatham	Varendran	Tamil		
1959	Aval Yaar	Sadhasivam	Tamil		
1959	Bhaaga Pirivinai	Kannaiyan	Tamil		
1960	Irumbu Thirai	Manickavasagam/Manickam	Tamil		
1960	Kuravanji	Kathiravan	Tamil		
1960	Deivapiravi	Madhavan	Tamil		
1960	Raja Bakthi	General Vikrangkadhan	Tamil		
1960	Padikkadha Medhai	Rangan	Tamil		
1960	Pillalu Techina Challani Rajyam	Scientist	Telugu	Guest appearance	
1960	Kuzhandhaigal Kanda Kudiyarasu	Scientist	Tamil	Guest appearance	
1960	Makkala Rajya	Scientist	Kannada	Guest appearance	
1960	Paavai Vilakku	Thanikachalam	Tamil		
1960	Petra Manam	Mohan / Periyar E. V. Ramasamy	Tamil		
1960	Vidivelli	Chandru	Tamil		
1961	Paava Mannippu	Ramu/Raheem	Tamil		
1961	Punar Janmam	Sankar	Tamil		
1961	Pasamalar	Rajasekaran "Raju"	Tamil		
1961	Ellam Unakkaga	Ananthan	Tamil		
1961	Sri Valli	Lord Murugan	Tamil		
1961	Marutha Nattu Veeran	General Jeevagan	Tamil		
1961	Palum Pazhamum	Dr.Ravi	Tamil		
1961	Kappalottiya Thamizhan	V. O. Chidambaram Pillai	Tamil		
1962	Parthaal Pasi Theerum	Balu	Tamil	75th Film	
1962	Nichaya Thamboolam	Raghu	Tamil		
1962	Valar Pirai	Kanagu	Tamil		
1962	Padithal Mattum Podhuma	Gopal	Tamil		
1962	Bale Pandiya	Pandiyan, Marudhu and Sankar (Note: Ganesan played three roles in this film.)	Tamil		
1962	Vadivukku Valai Kappu	Kumara Vijayaboopathy	Tamil		
1962	Senthamarai	Chandran	Tamil		
1962	Bandha Pasam	Parthiban	Tamil		
1962	Aalayamani	Thiyagarajan (Thiyagu)	Tamil		
1963	Chitor Rani Padmini	Rana Ratan Singh	Tamil		
1963	Arivaali	Alavanthan	Tamil		
1963	Iruvar Ullam	Selvam	Tamil		
1963	Naan Vanangum Dheivam	Sundaram	Tamil		
1963	Kulamagal Radhai	Chandran	Tamil		
1963	Paar Magaley Paar	Zamindar Sivalingam	Tamil		
1963	Kunkhumam	Sundaram	Tamil		
1963	Ratha Thilagam	Major Kumar	Tamil		
1963	Kalyaniyin Kanavan	Kathiresan	Tamil		
1963	Annai Illam	Kumaresan (Kumar)	Tamil		
1964	Karnan	Karnan	Tamil		
1964	Pachhai Vilakku	Sarathy	Tamil		
1964	School Master	Johnny	Malayalam	Guest appearance	
1964	Aandavan Kattalai	Professor Krishnan / Moorthy	Tamil		
1964	Kai Kodutha Deivam	Raghu	Tamil		
1964	Puthiya Paravai	Gopal	Tamil		
1964	Muradan Muthu	Kalimuthu (Muthu)	Tamil		
1964	Navarathri	Various (Note: Ganesan played nine different roles: Arputharaj, a drunkard, Dr. Karunakaran, a gunman, a villager, a leper, Sathyavan Singaram, Veerappan, and Anand.)	Tamil	100th Film and 9 roles	
1964	Ramadasu	Lakshmana	Telugu	Guest appearance	
1965	Pazhani	Pazhani	Tamil		
1965	Anbu Karangal	Sivaraman	Tamil		
1965	Santhi	Santhanam	Tamil		
1965	Thiruvilaiyadal	Lord Shiva	Tamil		
1965	Neela Vaanam	Babu	Tamil		
1966	Motor Sundaram Pillai	Sundaram Pillai	Tamil		
1966	Mahakavi Kalidas	Kalidasan	Tamil		
1966	Thaaye Unakkaga	Captain Swamy	Tamil	Guest appearance	
1966	Saraswathi Sabatham	Narada Muni / Vidhyapathy	Tamil		
1966	Selvam	Selvam	Tamil		
1967	Kanthan Karunai	Veerabaghu	Tamil		
1967	Nenjirukkum Varai	Raguraman (Ragu)	Tamil		
1967	Pesum Deivam	Chandru	Tamil		
1967	Thangai	Madhanagopal (Madhan)	Tamil		
1967	Paaladai	Sekar	Tamil		
1967	Thiruvarutchelvar	King, Sekkizhar, Sundarar, Tiru Kurippu Thonda Nayanar, and Appar	Tamil	Five roles	
1967	Iru Malargal	Sundar	Tamil		
1967	Ooty Varai Uravu	Ravi	Tamil		
1968	Thirumal Perumai	Periyalvar, Thondaradippodi Alvar, and Thirumangai Alvar	Tamil	Three roles	
1968	Harichandra	Harichandra Maharaja	Tamil		
1968	Galatta Kalyanam	Madhan	Tamil		
1968	En Thambi	Kannan / Chinnaiya	Tamil		
1968	Thillana Mohanambal	"Sikkal" Shanmugasundaram	Tamil		
1968	Enga Oor Raja	Sedhupathy and Boopathy	Tamil		
1968	Lakshmi Kalyanam	Kathirvel	Tamil		
1968	Uyarndha Manithan	Rajalingam "Raju"	Tamil	125th Film	
1969	Anbalippu	Velu	Tamil		
1969	Thanga Surangam	Rajan	Tamil		
1969	Kaaval Dheivam	Samundi	Tamil		
1969	Gurudhakshanai	Kannan	Tamil		
1969	Anjal Petti 520	Prabu	Tamil		
1969	Nirai Kudam	Prabhakar / Doctor. Babu	Tamil		
1969	Deiva Magan	Sankar, Kannan and Vijay	Tamil		
1969	Thirudan	Raju	Tamil		
1969	Sivandha Mann	Bharath	Tamil		
1970	Enga Mama	Koteeswaran	Tamil		
1970	Dharti	Ananth	Hindi		
1970	Vilaiyattu Pillai	Muthaiya	Tamil		
1970	Vietnam Veedu	"Pristige" Padmanabhan Iyer	Tamil		
1970	Ethiroli	Advogate Sankar	Tamil		
1970	Raman Ethanai Ramanadi	Sappattu Raman (Vijayakumar)	Tamil		
1970	Engirundho Vandhaal	Gunasekar (Sekar)	Tamil		
1970	Sorgam	Sankar	Tamil		
1970	Paadhukaappu	Kanthan	Tamil		
1971	Iru Thuruvam	Rangan	Tamil		
1971	Thangaikkaaga	Ramu / Ravi	Tamil		
1971	Arunodhayam	Prabhu	Tamil		
1971	Kulama Gunama	Chinnathambi	Tamil		
1971	Praptham	Kannan	Tamil		
1971	Sumathi En Sundari	Madhu	Tamil		
1971	Savaale Samali	Manickam	Tamil	150th Film	
1971	Thenum Paalum	Ramu	Tamil		
1971	Moondru Deivangal	Siva	Tamil		
1971	Babu	Babu	Tamil		
1972	Raja	Raja / Sekar	Tamil		
1972	Gnana Oli	Antony/Arun	Tamil	Filmfare Award for Best Actor – Tamil	
1972	Pattikada Pattanama	Mookaiya/Mukesh	Tamil		
1972	Dharmam Engey	Rajasekar	Tamil		
1972	Thavapudhalavan	Nirmal	Tamil		
1972	Vasantha Maligai	Ananth	Tamil		
1972	Neethi	Raja	Tamil		
1973	Bangaru Babu	Himself	Telugu	Guest appearance	
1973	Bharatha Vilas	Gopal	Tamil		
1973	Rajaraja Cholan	Raja Raja Cholan	Tamil		
1973	Ponnunjal	Muthu	Tamil		
1973	Bhakta Tukaram	Shivaji	Telugu	Guest appearance	
1973	Engal Thanga Raja	Dr.Thangaraja / Pattakathi Bhairavan	Tamil		
1973	Gauravam	Barister Rajinikanth and Advocate Kannan	Tamil	Filmfare Award for Best Actor – Tamil	
1973	Manidharil Manikkam	Dr.Ananth	Tamil		
1973	Rajapart Rangadurai	Rangadurai/Rajapart	Tamil		
1974	Sivagamiyin Selvan	Ashok and Ananth	Tamil		
1974	Thaai	Ananthan	Tamil		
1974	Vani Rani	Ranga	Tamil		
1974	Thangappathakkam	S. P. Chowdhury	Tamil		
1974	En Magan	Raja alias Rajarathnam and Eattu Ramaiya Devar	Tamil		
1974	Anbai Thedi	Ramu	Tamil		
1975	Manidhanum Dheivamagalam	Kumaraiya and Sundaram	Tamil		
1975	Cinema Paithiyam	Vanchinathan (Getup role)	Tamil	Guest appearance	
1975	Avandhan Manidhan	Ravikumar	Tamil	175th Film	
1975	Mannavan Vanthaanadi	Dharmaraja /Thirumalai/Chandramohan	Tamil		
1975	Anbe Aaruyire	Saravanan	Tamil		
1975	Vaira Nenjam	Ananth	Tamil		
1975	Dr. Siva	Dr. Siva	Tamil		
1975	Paattum Bharathamum	Ravisankar and Arun	Tamil		
1976	Unakkaga Naan	Raja	Tamil		
1976	Grahapravesam	Raju	Tamil		
1976	Sathyam	Dharmalingam	Tamil		
1976	Uththaman	Gopi/Gopalakrishnan	Tamil		
1976	Chitra Pournami	Sengodan	Tamil		
1976	Rojavin Raja	Raja	Tamil		
1977	Avan Oru Sarithiram	Sankar I.A.S	Tamil		
1977	Dheepam	Raja / Somu	Tamil		
1977	Ilaya Thalaimurai	Sampath	Tamil		
1977	Jeevana Teeralu	Nagulu	Telugu	Guest appearance	
1977	Chanakya Chandragupta	Alexander	Telugu	Guest appearance	
1977	Naam Pirandha Mann	Santhanadevan	Tamil		
1977	Annan Oru Koyil	Dr.Ramesh	Tamil		
1978	Andaman Kadhali	Prabhu	Tamil		
1978	Thyagam	Raja / Rajasekaran	Tamil		
1978	Ennai Pol Oruvan	Sekar and Sundaramoorthy	Tamil		
1978	Punniya Boomi	Manickam and Raju	Tamil		
1978	General Chakravarthi	Chakravarthi	Tamil		
1978	Thacholi Ambu	Thacholi Othenakkurup	Malayalam		
1978	Pilot Premnath	Premnath	Tamil		
1978	Justice Gopinath	Gopinath	Tamil		
1979	Thirisoolam	Rajasekhar, Shankar & Gurumoorthy	Tamil	200th Film	
1979	Kavari Maan	Thyagarajan	Tamil		
1979	Nallathoru Kudumbam	Raja / Dr.Rajaraman	Tamil		
1979	Imayam	Gangadaran	Tamil		
1979	Naan Vazhavaippen	Ravi	Tamil		
1979	Pattakkathi Bhairavan	Bhairavan	Tamil		
1979	Vetrikku Oruvan	Saravanan	Tamil		
1980	Rishi Moolam	SP Santhosh IPS	Tamil		
1980	Natchathiram	Himself	Tamil	Guest appearance	
1980	Dharma Raja	Dharmaraj	Tamil		
1980	Yamanukku Yaman	Sathya and Yama Dharmaraja	Tamil		
1980	Ratha Paasam	Maharaja / Baba	Tamil	Also screenwriter	
1980	Vishwaroopam	Sathyamoorthy and Raja	Tamil		
1981	Mohana Punnagai	Rajasekar / Raju / Raghavan	Tamil		
1981	Sathya Sundharam	Mannangatti, Sundaram	Tamil		
1981	Amara Kaaviyam	Raja	Tamil		
1981	Kalthoon	Parameswaran Kavundar	Tamil		
1981	Lorry Driver Rajakannu	Rajakannu	Tamil		
1981	Maadi Veettu Ezhai	Paramanandam and Mohan	Tamil		
1981	Keezh Vaanam Sivakkum	Dwarakanath	Tamil		
1982	Hitler Umanath	Umanath	Tamil		
1982	Oorukku Oru Pillai	Siva	Tamil		
1982	Vaa Kanna Vaa	Naidu	Tamil		
1982	Garuda Saukiyama	Deenadayalan	Tamil		
1982	Sangili	DSP Saravanan / Sangili	Tamil		
1982	Vasandhathil Or Naal	Rajasekaran	Tamil		
1982	Theerpu	Rajashekar	Tamil	225th Film	
1982	Nivuru Gappina Nippu		Telugu		
1982	Thyagi	IG Ganesh IPS and Kanwarlal	Tamil		
1982	Thunai	Dhasaratharaman	Tamil		
1982	Paritchaikku Neramaachu	Narasimmachaari	Tamil		
1982	Oorum Uravum	Manickam	Tamil		
1982	Nenjangal	Raja	Tamil		
1983	Bezawada Bebbuli	Ravindra and ASP Raghu	Telugu		
1983	Uruvangal Maralam	God	Tamil	Guest appearance	
1983	Neethibathi	Rajasekar	Tamil		
1983	Imaigal	Akbar Baasha	Tamil		
1983	Sandhippu	Ramanathan / Raja	Tamil		
1983	Sumangali	Ramu	Tamil		
1983	Miruthanga Chakravarthi	Miruthanga Chakravarthi Subbaiya	Tamil		
1983	Vellai Roja	Father James & S P Arul IPS	Tamil		
1984	Thiruppam	D.I.G Rajasekhar	Tamil		
1984	Chiranjeevi	Chiranjeevi	Tamil		
1984	Tharaasu	Manaalan	Tamil		
1984	Vaazhkai	Rajasekhar	Tamil		
1984	Sarithira Nayagan	Pandiaraja	Tamil		
1984	Simma Soppanam	Advocate Karthikeyan	Tamil		
1984	Ezhuthatha Sattangal	Nazeer	Tamil		
1984	Iru Medhaigal	Ranga	Tamil		
1984	Dhavani Kanavugal	Captain Chidambaram	Tamil		
1984	Vamsa Vilakku	Sathyamoorthy / Chakravarthy	Tamil		
1985	Bandham	Abraham	Tamil		
1985	Naam Iruvar	Veerayya	Tamil	250th Film	
1985	Padikkadha Pannaiyar	Periya Pannaiyar	Tamil		
1985	Needhiyin Nizhal	D.I.G Nithyanandam	Tamil		
1985	Nermai	Gowri Shankar	Tamil		
1985	Muthal Mariyathai	Malaichami	Tamil		
1985	Raja Rishi	Saint Vishvamithrar Maharishi	Tamil		
1985	Padikkadavan	Rajasekhar	Tamil		
1986	Saadhanai	Director Ramkumar	Tamil		
1986	Marumagal	Chandrasekhar	Tamil		
1986	Anandha Kanneer	Kalyanarama Iyer	Tamil		
1986	Viduthalai	Inspector Rajasingam	Tamil		
1986	Thaaiku Oru Thaalaattu	Rajasekaran	Tamil		
1986	Lakshmi Vandhachu	Rajasekar	Tamil		
1986	Mannukkul Vairam	Thavasi	Tamil		
1987	Raja Mariyadhai	Rajasekar	Tamil		
1987	Kudumbam Oru Kovil	Shankar	Tamil		
1987	Muthukkal Moondru	Father	Tamil		
1987	Veerapandiyan	Paandi	Tamil		
1987	Anbulla Appa	Rajasekaran	Tamil		
1987	Viswanatha Nayakudu	Nagama Nayaka	Telugu		
1987	Agni Putrudu	Chaitanya	Telugu		
1987	Krishnan Vandhaan	Sivaraman	Tamil		
1987	Jallikattu	Ram Prakash	Tamil		
1987	Thambathyam	Sathyamoorthy	Tamil		
1988	En Thamizh En Makkal		Tamil		
1988	Puthiya Vaanam	D. I. G. Pandidurai	Tamil	275th Film	
1991	Gnana Paravai	Sivaji	Tamil		
1992	Naangal	Chathurvedi	Tamil		
1992	Chinna Marumagal		Tamil		
1992	Mudhal Kural	Jeeva	Tamil		
1992	Thevar Magan	Periya Thevar	Tamil		
1993	Paarambariyam	Rajamannar	Tamil		
1995	Pasumpon	Durairasu Devar	Tamil		
1997	Once More	Selvam	Tamil		
1997	Oru Yathramozhi	Anantha Subramaniam	Malayalam		
1998	En Aasai Rasave	Valayapathi	Tamil		
1999	Mannavaru Chinnavaru	Rajashekar	Tamil		
1999	Padayappa	Dharmalingam	Tamil		
1999	Poovellam Kettuppar	Himself	Tamil	Cameo appearance	
1999	Pooparika Varugirom	Unnamed author	Tamil	Last release	

== Television ==
Year	Title	Notes	Ref.
1974	Chatrapati Sivaji	Television film	
1996	Meendum Gowravam	Television serial	

== Bibliography ==
- Ganesan, Sivaji; Narayana Swamy, T. S. (2007) [2002]. Autobiography of an Actor: Sivaji Ganesan, October 1928 – July 2001. Sivaji Prabhu Charities Trust.
- Pillai, Swarnavel Eswaran (2015). Madras Studios: Narrative, Genre, and Ideology in Tamil Cinema. India: SAGE Publications. ISBN 978-93-5150-121-3.
- Rajadhyaksha, Ashish; Willemen, Paul (1998) [1994]. Encyclopaedia of Indian Cinema (PDF). Oxford University Press. ISBN 0-19-563579-5.
- Ramachandran, Naman (2014) [2012]. Rajinikanth: The Definitive Biography. Penguin Books. ISBN 978-0-14-342111-5.
