= List of Tamil films of 1984 =

Post-amendment to the Tamil Nadu Entertainments Tax Act 1939 on 1 April 1958, Gross jumped to 140 per cent of Nett Commercial Taxes Department disclosed ₹45 crore in entertainment tax revenue for the year.

The following is a list of films produced in the Tamil film industry in India in 1984, in alphabetical order.

Title	Director	Producer	Music	Cast
24 Mani Neram	Manivannan	Thirupathiswamy Pictures	Ilaiyaraaja	Mohan, Jaishankar, Nalini, Sathyaraj, Swapna, Ilavarasi
Aathora Aatha	Mangadu Ramachandran	Sri Jothi Arts	S. Neminathan	Chakravarthy, Raghuvaran, Anuradha, Y. Vijaya, Srilatha, Srikamu
Aayiram Kaigal	A. V. Babu	Kailash Combines	Malaysia Vasudevan	Ramakrishnan, Samundeeswari
Achamillai Achamillai	K. Balachander	Kavithalayaa Productions	V. S. Narasimhan	Rajesh, Saritha, Delhi Ganesh, Pavithra, Ahalaya
Alaya Deepam	C. V. Sridhar	K. R. G. Film Circuit	M. S. Viswanathan	Sujatha, Jaishankar, Suresh, Rajesh, Ilavarasi, Vanitha, Y. G. Mahendra, Thengai Srinivasan, Manorama
Ambigai Neril Vanthaal	Manivannan	Ram Arts	Ilaiyaraaja	Mohan, Radha, Y. G. Mahendra, Janagaraj, Senthil
Amma Irukka	Major Sundarrajan	S. M. G. Pictures	Shankar–Ganesh	Sivakumar, Jaishankar, Sulakshana, V. K. Ramasamy, Major Sundarrajan, Thengai Srinivasan, Manorama, Tambaram Lalitha
Anbe Odi Vaa	R. Ranjith Kumar	K. R. Art Pictures	Ilaiyaraaja	Mohan, Urvashi, Manorama
Anbulla Malare	B. R. Ravishankar	V. V. Combines	Ilaiyaraaja	Sarath Babu, Shanthi Krishna, Vijay Menon
Anbulla Rajinikanth	K. Natraj	S. T. Combines	Ilaiyaraaja	Rajinikanth, Ambika, Baby Meena
Antha June 16 Am Naal	A. Shanmugam	Bama Creation	T. K. Ramamoorthy	Sivachandran, Rathi Devi, V. S. Raghavan
Antha Uravukku Satchi	R. Pattabhiraman	Kaveri Pictures	Shankar–Ganesh	Srikanth, Sivachandran, Sumithra, Y. Vijaya
Azhagu	K. Vijayan	Seshasayi Films	G. K. Venkatesh	Sarath Babu, Sumathi
Chiranjeevi	K. Shankar	Guru Ram Movies	M. S. Viswanathan	Sivaji Ganesan, Sowcar Janaki, Sripriya, Sarath Babu, Vijayakumar
Devi Sri Devi	Gangai Amaran	Abi Arts	Ilaiyaraaja	Suresh, Mahalakshmi
Dharmakartha	K. V. R.	R. R. Arts	P. Srinivasan	Raja, Mohana
Dhavanik Kanavugal	K. Bhagyaraj	Praveena Film Circuit	Ilaiyaraaja	K. Bhagyaraj, Sivaji Ganesan, Radhika, Ilavarasi, Poornima Rao, Nithya
Dhinam Thorum Deepavali	V. Karthikeyan	Gokulam Cine Arts	Sankar Ganesh	Karthik
Enakkul Oruvan	S. P. Muthuraman	Kavithalayaa Productions	Ilaiyaraaja	Kamal Haasan, Shobana, Sripriya, Sathyaraj
Etho Mogam	T. K. Manian	Bharani Cine Arts	Ilaiyaraaja	Suresh, Bhanupriya
Ezhuthatha Sattangal	K. Shankar	Sivashankar Creations	Ilaiyaraaja	Sivaji Ganesan, Prabhu, Srividya, Nalini, Urvashi, Jaishankar, Sarath Babu
Idhu Enga Boomi	M. Karnan	Surya Lakshmi Films	Shankar–Ganesh	Vijayakanth, Anuradha, Jayamalini
Ingeyum Oru Gangai	Manivannan	Everest Films	Ilaiyaraaja	Murali, Thara
Iru Medhaigal	V. Srinivasan	Muktha Films	M. S. Viswanathan	Sivaji Ganesan, Prabhu, Saritha, Radha, Silk Smitha
Irumbu Kaigal	G. S. Mani	Mani Chithra Films	Gangai Amaran	Prabhu, Ambika, Y. G. Mahendra
January 1	Manivannan	P. N. R. Pictures	Ilaiyaraaja	Vijayakanth, Sulakshana, Thara, Sathyaraj, Janagaraj
Kadamai	Rama Narayanan	P. S. V. Pictures	Shankar–Ganesh	Jaishankar, Sripriya, Anand Babu, Arjun, Ilavarasi, Anuradha
Kai Kodukkum Kai	Mahendran	Sri Raghavendras	Ilaiyaraaja	Rajinikanth, Revathi, Rajyalakshmi, Y. G. Mahendra
Kairasikkaran	S. S. K. Sankar	S. K. S. Films	Ilaiyaraaja	Prabhu, Radha, Silk Smitha, Y. G. Mahendra
Kalyana Kanavugal	K. Sivarajan	Sylvie Films	Ilaiyaraaja	Rajesh, Vijayashanti
Kathula Poo	G. K.	Giriya Cine Arts	Shankar–Ganesh	Raghavendar, Aruna, Vennira Aadai Moorthy
Kaval Kaithigal	Rama Narayanan	Poompuhar Production	Shankar–Ganesh	Raveendran, Sasikala
Komberi Mookan	A. Jagannathan	Lakshmi Shanthi Movies	Ilaiyaraaja	Thiagarajan, Saritha, Urvashi, Goundamani, Senthil
Kudumbam	S. A. Chandrasekhar	Lalithanjali Productions	Gangai Amaran	Vijayakanth, Jaishankar, Sujatha, Devisri
Kuva Kuva Vaathugal	Manivannan	Panchu Movies	Ilaiyaraaja	Sivakumar, Sulakshana, Pandiyan, Ilavarasi
Kuyile Kuyile	Srini	P. K. D. Pictures	Shyam	Raghuvaran, Rani, Radha Ravi, Sumithra
Kuzhandhai Yesu	V. Rajan	I. J. C. Productions	Shyam	Vijayakanth, Rajesh, Saritha, Deepa
Maaman Machaan	Rama Narayanan	Alamelu Pictures	Shankar–Ganesh	Vijayakanth, Urvashi
Madras Vathiyar	Vijaya Bhaskar	Jai Geetha Movies	Shankar–Ganesh	Vijayakanth, Sasikala, Anuradha
Madurai Sooran	M. R. Vijaychander	K. V. Creations	Shankar–Ganesh	Vijayakanth, Anuradha, Radha Ravi
Magudi	Sakki	S. N. S. Productions	Ilaiyaraaja	Mohan, Nalini
Manmadha Rajakkal	Rama Narayanan	Thilaga Creations	Shankar–Ganesh	Suresh, Nalini
Mann Soru	Kandasami Singaram	Mekalai Films	Shankar–Ganesh	Pandiyan, Sulakshana
Matran Thottathu Malligai	Vijaya Sarathy	Matha Movie Makers		Ramraj, Vanithasri
Mudivalla Arambam	N. Moideen	N. M. Enterprises	Ilaiyaraaja	Sarath Babu, Rajesh, Jyothi, Raghuvaran
My Dear Kuttichathan	Jijo	Navodaya Studios	Ilaiyaraaja	Baby Sonia, Master Aravind, Master Mukesh
Naalai Unathu Naal	A. Jagannathan	Vasan Productions	Ilaiyaraaja	Vijayakanth, Nalini, Jaishankar, Goundamani
Naan Mahaan Alla	S. P. Muthuraman	Kavithalayaa Productions	Ilaiyaraaja	Rajinikanth, Radha, Cho
Naan Paadum Paadal	R. Sundarrajan	Motherland Pictures	Ilaiyaraaja	Sivakumar, Mohan, Ambika, Pandiyan, Ilavarasi, Goundamani
Nalam Nalamariya Aaval	P.Jayadevi	Tulasi Arts	Shyam	Mohan, Saritha
Nalla Naal	R. Thyagarajan	Devar Films	Ilaiyaraaja	Vijayakanth, Thiagarajan, Nalini, Viji
Nallavanukku Nallavan	S. P. Muthuraman	AVM Productions	Ilaiyaraaja	Rajinikanth, Radhika, Karthik, Tulasi, Y. G. Mahendra
Naanayam Illatha Naanayam	Visu	K. R. K. Art Films	Vijay Anand	Rajesh, Yamuna, Visu, S. Ve. Shekher
Nandri	Rama Narayanan	Rajmagal Films	Shankar–Ganesh	Karthik, Nalini, Arjun, Mahalakshmi, Anuradha
Nee Thodum Pothu	V. C. Guhanathan	Sri Devi Moogambigai Films	Ilaiyaraaja	Rajesh, Lakshmi, Raghuvaran
Neengal Kettavai	Balu Mahendra	Filmco	Ilaiyaraaja	Thiagarajan, Bhanu Chander, Archana, Silk Smitha
Neethikku Oru Penn	P. Kalaignanam	Abhirami Arts Production	Shankar–Ganesh	Suresh, Ambika
Nenjathai Allitha	Ameerjan	R. V. Creations	M. S. Viswanathan	Mohan, Sadhana, Naresh
Neram Nalla Neram	N. Sambandam	V. R. Movies	Ilaiyaraaja	Pandiyan, Urvashi
Nerupukkul Eeram	R. Krishnamoorthy	Sathya Movies	Ilaiyaraaja	Thiagarajan, Ambika, Urvashi
Nichayam	S. Venkat	Om Chithra Productions	Gangai Amaran	Prabhu, Nalini, Pandiyan
Nilavu Suduvathillai	K. Rangaraj	Rajarajeswari Cini Arts	Ilaiyaraaja	Sivakumar, Radhika, Goundamani
Ninaivugal	M. Vellaisamy	Priyadharshni Films	Shankar–Ganesh	Karthik, Sripriya, Radha, Sarath Babu
Niraparaadhi	K. Vijayan	Suresh Arts	Shankar–Ganesh	Mohan, Madhavi, Nizhalgal Ravi
Nooravathu Naal	Manivannan	Thirupathisamy Pictures	Ilaiyaraaja	Mohan, Vijayakanth, Nalini, Sathyaraj
Nyayam	R. Krishnamoorthy	Charuchithra Films	Ilaiyaraaja	Prabhu, Nalini
Nyayam Ketkiren	S. Muthusami	Visagam Films	Gangai Amaran	Anand Babu, Devibala
Oh Maane Maane	A. Jagannathan	Filmco	Ilaiyaraaja	Mohan, Urvashi
Oomai Janangal	Jayabharathi	Kavithyuga Creations	Gangai Amaran	S. Ve. Shekher, Urvashi
Oorukku Upadesam	S. P. Muthuraman	Vasan Brothers	Vijay Anand	S. Ve. Shekher, Urvashi, Visu
Osai	K. Vijayan	Jay Vee Movies	Shankar–Ganesh	Mohan, Radhika, Nalini, Baby Shalini
Pei Veedu	Rama Narayanan	Eagle Productions	Shankar–Ganesh	Karthik, Ambika, S. Ve. Shekher, Vanitha
Pillaiyar	V. T. Arasu	Shasti Films	Soolamangalam Rajalakshmi	Arunkumar, Sathyakala, Y. G. Mahendra
Ponnu Pudichirukku	K. Rangaraj	Sri Amman Creations	Chandrabose	Pandiyan, Revathi, Goundamani
Poovilangu	Ameerjan	Kavithalayaa Productions	Ilaiyaraaja	Murali, Kuyili, Poovilangu Mohan, Y. Vijaya
Pozhuthu Vidinchachu	Gangai Amaran	Sooraj Enterprises	Ilaiyaraaja	Prabhu, Sulakshana
Priyamudan Prabhu	P. Gangaikondan	Mohan Productions	Gangai Amaran	Prabhu, Rajeev, Brindha, Nagesh, Goundamani
Pudhiavan	Ameerjan	Kavithalayaa Productions	V. S. Narasimhan	Murali, Anitha, Raveendran
Pudhumai Penn	Bharathiraja	AVM Productions	Ilaiyaraaja	Pandiyan, Revathi, Pratap K. Pothen, Rajasekhar
Puthiya Sangamam	Charuhasan	Radhakrishna Combines	Ramakrishna Raaja	Prabhu, Suhasini, Charuhasan
Puyal Kadantha Bhoomi	Visu	Vimal Enterprises	M. S. Viswanathan	Karthik, Archana, Chandrasekhar, Anand Babu, Visu, Kismu, Kamala Kamesh, Anuradha
Raja Veettu Kannukkutty	C. V. Rajendran	Preethi Creations	M. S. Viswanathan	Prabhu, Viji, S. Ve. Shekher, Y. G. Mahendra, Manorama, Anuradha
Rajathanthiram	Visu	Bagavathi Creations	M. S. Viswanathan	Karthik, Sulakshana, Kismu, Prameela
Rusi	Manamohan	Subravalli Films	Gangai Amaran	Mohan, Swapna, Srikanth
Sanga Natham	G. Ramineedu	Janasakthi Creations	Ilaiyaraaja	Rajesh, Rajyalakshmi
Sarithira Nayagan	D. Yoganand	Ramakrishna Cine Studios	M. S. Viswanathan	Sivaji Ganesan, Prabhu, Sharada, Radha
Sathiyam Neeye	P. Madhavan	Kanmani Creations	Shankar–Ganesh	Vijayakanth, Viji
Sattathai Thiruthungal	Rama Narayanan	P. N. R. Pictures	Gangai Amaran	Mohan, Nalini, Jaishankar, Y. G. Mahendra, Silk Smitha
Sabaash	Rama Narayanan	P. S. V. Films	Shankar–Ganesh	Vijayakanth, Sasikala, Radha Ravi
Shankari	T. R. Ramanna	Revathi Combines	V. Kumar	Thiagarajan, Saritha, Suresh, Sasikala
Shanthi Muhurtham	Sripriya	Sri Veernar Films	Shankar–Ganesh	Mohan, Urvashi, Sripriya, Manorama
Simma Soppanam	S. S. Karuppasamy-R. Krishna	S. S. K. Films	K. V. Mahadevan	Sivaji Ganesan, Prabhu, K. R. Vijaya, Saritha, Radha
Sirai	R. C. Sakthi	Ananthi Films	M. S. Viswanathan	Lakshmi, Rajesh, Pandiyan, Ilavarasi
Sukra Desai	T. K. Mohan	Nageswari Combines	Shankar–Ganesh	Pandiyan, Viji, Y. G. Mahendra, Vanitha
Sumangali Kolam	Vijaya Nirmala	Sri Vijaya Krishna Movies	Ramesh Naidu	Vijayakumar, Vijaya Nirmala, Sunitha
Thalaiyanai Manthiram	N. Venkatesh	Naveena Films	Ilaiyaraaja	Pandiyan, Sulakshana
Thambikku Entha Ooru	Rajasekhar	P. A. Art Productions	Ilaiyaraaja	Rajinikanth, Madhavi, Sulakshana
Thanga Koppai	R. C. Sakthi	Abhirami Arts Production	Shankar–Ganesh	K. R. Vijaya, 'Karate' Mani
Thangamadi Thangam	Rama Narayanan	Vasanthalayam	Ilaiyaraaja	Ambika, Alex
Tharaasu	Raja Ganapathi	Raja Ganapathi Films	M. S. Viswanathan	Sivaji Ganesan, Prabhu, K. R. Vijaya, Ambika, Y. G. Mahendra, Silk Smitha
Theerpu En Kaiyil	V. P. Sunder	Manjunatha Cine Creations	Shankar–Ganesh	Vijayakanth, Chandrasekhar, Sasikala, Bhanu Chander, Anuradha
Then Koodu	V. Satyanarayana	Sri Ganapathy Arts	Ghantasala Vijayakumar	Major Sundarrajan, K. R. Vijaya, Radha Ravi, Sumithra, Suresh, Viji, Nagesh
Then Sittukkal	N. Damodharan	S. B. S. Creations		
Thiruppam	R. Krishnamoorthy	K. R. G. Film Circuit	M. S. Viswanathan	Sivaji Ganesan, Sujatha, Prabhu, Ambika, Jaishankar, Y. G. Mahendra
Thiruttu Rajakkal	Rama Narayanan	Poompuhar Production	Shankar–Ganesh	Suresh, Jalaja, S. Ve. Shekher
Ullam Urugudadi	Erode N. Murugesh	Ganesh Arts	Ilaiyaraaja	Suresh, Viji
Unga Veetu Pillai	C. V. Rajendran	Pallavi Combines	Shankar–Ganesh	Prabhu, Poornima Jayaram, Y. G. Mahendra, Manorama
Unnai Naan Santhithen	K. Rangaraj	Motherland Pictures	Ilaiyaraaja	Sivakumar, Sujatha, Suresh, Revathi, Mohan, Goundamani
Uravai Kaatha Kili	T. Rajendar	Thangai Cine Arts	T. Rajendar	T. Rajendar, Saritha, Jeevitha
Urimai Thedum Uravu	Sakthi Das	Otteri Muthuramman Movies	Madan-Dhamu	Raja, Thulasi, Devibala, Anuradha, Goundamani, Manorama
Vaazhkai	C. V. Rajendran	Gayathri Films	Ilaiyaraaja	Sivaji Ganesan, Ambika, Raveendran, Nizhalgal Ravi, Pandiyan, Y. G. Mahendra, Silk Smitha, Deepa, Y. Vijaya
Vai Pandal	Rama Narayanan	Geethanjali Movies	Shankar–Ganesh	Mohan, Urvashi, Y. G. Mahendra, Vanitha
Vai Sollil Veeranadi	Visu	Vasan Brothers	Vijay Anand	Raveendran, Sadhana, Y. G. Mahendra, Vanitha, Visu, Manorama, Kismu
Vaidehi Kathirunthal	R. Sundarrajan	Appu Movies	Ilaiyaraaja	Vijayakanth, Revathi, Goundamani, Senthil
Vamsa Vilakku	R. Krishnamoorthy	Rathna Movies	Gangai Amaran	Sivaji Ganesan, Prabhu, K. R. Vijaya, Radhika, Nalini, Y. G. Mahendra
Vanga Mappille Vanga	Sivashankar	Jacob Films	Shankar–Ganesh	Sivashankar, Devisri
Veetuku Oru Kannagi	S. A. Chandrasekhar	V. V. Creations	Shankar–Ganesh	Vijayakanth, Jaishankar, Sujatha, Nalini, Y. G. Mahendra, Raveendran, Sathyakala, Ilavarasi
Vellai Pura Ondru	Gangai Amaran	AVM Productions	Ilaiyaraaja	Vijayakanth, Jaishankar, Sujatha, Suresh, Urvashi, Nalini, Silk Smitha
Vengaiyin Mainthan	Rama Narayanan	Sri Thenandal Films	Shankar–Ganesh	Mohan, Vijayakanth, Jaishankar, Radha, Nalini, S. Ve. Shekher, Pandiyan, Urvashi, Ilavarasi
Vetri	S. A. Chandrasekhar	P. S. V. Films	Shankar–Ganesh	Vijayakanth, Viji, Raja, Y. G. Mahendra, Anuradha
Vidhi	K. Vijayan	Sujatha Cine Arts	Shankar–Ganesh	Sujatha, Mohan, Poornima Jayaram, Jaishankar
