= Prabhu filmography =

Performances by Indian actor

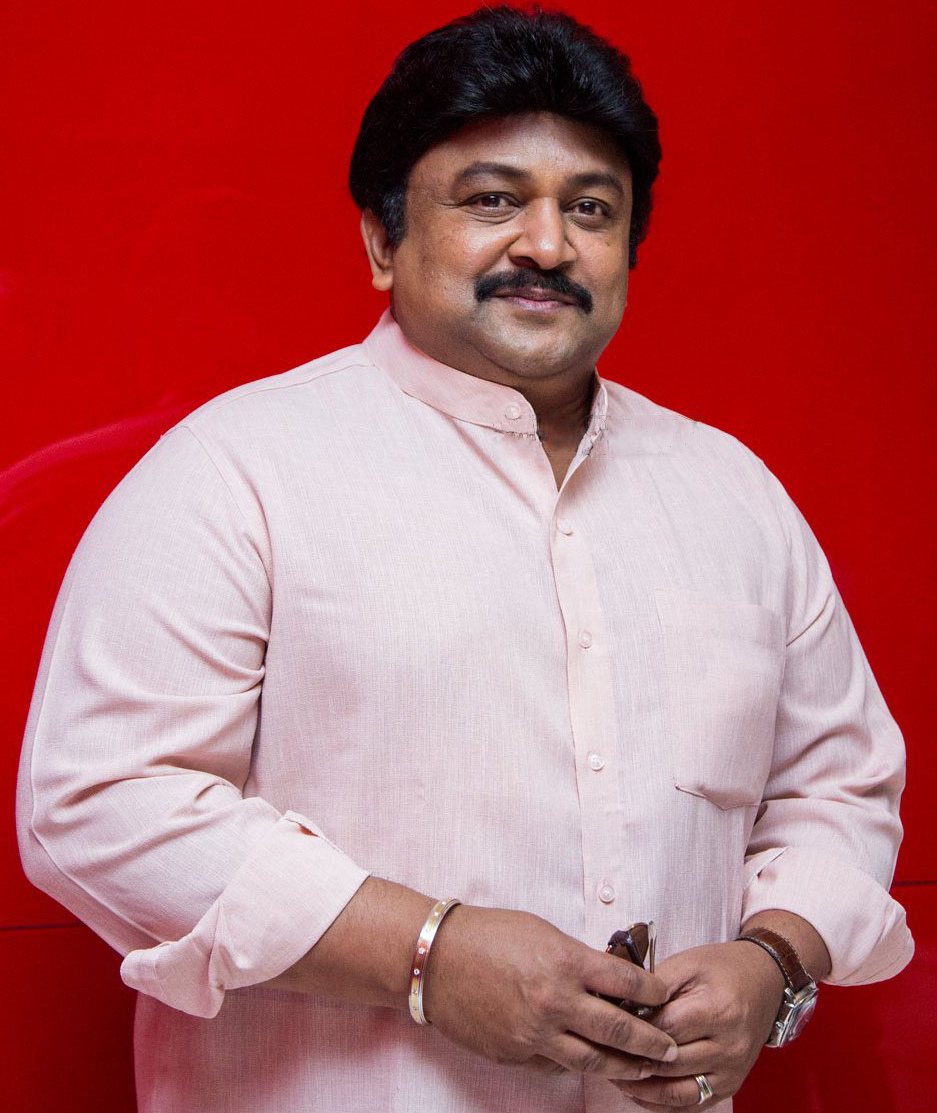
Actor Prabhu

The following is the filmography of Prabhu. Besides Tamil he has also acted in Telugu, Malayalam and Kannada films.

== As an actor ==
=== Films ===
==== Tamil films ====
Year	Film	Role	Notes	Ref.
1982	Sangili	Rajali		
1982	Lottery Ticket	Bhairavan		
1982	Nalanthana	Ramu		
1982	Kannodu Kan	Rajadurai		
1982	Adhisayappiravigal	Nachimuthu		
1982	Chinnan Chirusugal	Prabhu		
1982	Kozhi Koovuthu	Velusamy		
1983	Neethibathi	Thyagu		
1983	Thalaimagan	Raja		
1983	Soorapuli	Prabhu		
1983	Sandhippu	Vijay		
1983	Sumangali	Prakash		
1983	Soorakottai Singakutti	Selvam		
1983	Raagangal Maruvathillai			
1983	Miruthanga Chakravarthi	Kannan		
1983	Vellai Roja	Peter		
1983	Muthu Engal Sothu	Muthu		
1984	Priyamudan Prabhu	Prabhu		
1984	Pozhudhu Vidinjachu	Mutthaiyya		
1984	Raja Veettu Kannukkutty	Siva		
1984	Tharaasu	Nagesh / Suresh	In This Film He has got the title 'Ilaiya Thilagam'	
1984	Thiruppam	Shankar		
1984	Nyayam	Raja		
1984	Sarithira Nayagan	Selvam		
1984	Kairasikkaran	Vijay		
1984	Simma Soppanam	Vijay		
1984	Ezhuthatha Sattangal	Shankar		
1984	Iru Medhaigal	Ranga		
1984	Vamsa Vilakku	Inspector Shankar / Raja		
1984	Unga Veettu Pillai	Ganesh		
1984	Puthiya Sangamam	Vijayan		
1984	Irumbu Kaigal			
1985	Kanni Rasi	Lakshmipathi		
1985	Naam Iruvar	Raja / Shankar		
1985	Needhiyin Nizhal	Vijay		
1985	Nermai	Raja		
1985	Aduthathu Albert	Albert		
1985	Raja Rishi	King Dusyantha		
1986	Saadhanai	Babu		
1986	Raja Nee Vaazhga	Raja		
1986	Nambinar Keduvathillai	Vinoth		
1986	Naalellam Pournami	Velan		
1986	Paalaivana Rojakkal	Balu		
1986	Aruvadai Naal	Muthuvel		
1987	Chinna Thambi Periya Thambi	Chinna Thambi		
1987	Megam Karuththirukku	Karuppu Devan		
1987	Chinna Poove Mella Pesu	David		
1987	Kavalan Avan Kovalan	Chakravarthi / Pachaiyappan		
1987	Vairagyam	Raja		
1987	Anjatha Singam	Raja		
1987	Poo Poova Poothirukku	Ramu		
1987	Ivargal Varungala Thoongal	Inspector		
1987	Mupperum Deviyar	Sudarshanan		
1987	Anand	Anand		
1988	Annanagar Mudhal Theru	Ramesh	Extended Cameo	
1988	En Uyir Kannamma	Shanmugam		
1988	Kaalaiyum Neeye Maalaiyum Neeye	Inspector Sekhar		
1988	Urimai Geetham	Thiyagu		
1988	Oruvar Vaazhum Aalayam	Swaminathan		
1988	Guru Sishyan	Babu		
1988	Agni Natchathiram	ACP Gautham		
1988	Manasukkul Mathappu	Shekar	Cinema Express Award for Best Actor – Tamil	
1988	En Thangachi Padichava	Periyasamy		
1988	Raththa Dhanam	Chinnaiya		
1988	Dharmathin Thalaivan	Raju		
1988	Kaliyugam	Inspector		
1988	Poovizhi Raja	Raja		
1988	Manamagale Vaa	Balu		
1989	Naalaiya Manithan	Inspector Vijay		
1989	Varam	Ravi		
1989	Pillaikkaga	Sangli Devan		
1989	Ninaivu Chinnam	Mutthikal Rasu		
1989	Moodu Manthiram	Dilip		
1989	Uthama Purushan	Raghu		
1989	Vetri Vizha	Vijay		
1989	Vetri Mel Vetri	Rajkumar		
1989	Ponnu Pakka Poren	Vembu		
1990	Kavalukku Kettikaran	SI Dhilipan		
1990	Nalla Kaalam Porandaachu	Muthu		
1990	Arangetra Velai	Sivaramakrishnan		
1990	Anjali	Dennis Joseph	Guest appearance	
1990	My Dear Marthandan	Marthandan		
1990	Sathya Vaakku	Raja / Marudhu		
1990	Urudhi Mozhi	Arun		
1990	Raja Kaiya Vacha	Raja		
1991	Kumbakarai Thangaiah	Thangaiya		
1991	Irumbu Pookkal	Military	Guest Appearance	
1991	Vetri Karangal	Arun / Thiyagarajan		
1991	Chinna Thambi	Chinna Thambi	Tamil Nadu State Film Award for Best Actor	
1991	Ayul Kaithi	Chandrasekhar		
1991	Kizhakku Karai	Murali		
1991	Thalattu Ketkuthamma	Rasaiya		
1992	Mannan	Himself	Cameo appearance	
1992	Pandithurai	Pandithurai		
1992	Naangal	Keerthi		
1992	Chinnavar	Muthu		
1992	Naalaya Seidhi	Manmadhan		
1992	Senthamizh Pattu	Balasubramaniyam		
1993	Chinna Maapillai	Thangavel		
1993	Uthama Raasa	Chinnaiya		
1993	Dharmaseelan	Thamizh Selvan & SP Dharma Seelan		
1993	Maravan	Sedhupathy		
1993	Uzhavan	Sundaram		
1994	Rajakumaran	Rajakumaran	100th Film	
1994	Duet	Guna		
1994	Priyanka	Arjun		
1994	Vietnam Colony	Venkata Krishnan		
1994	Jallikattu Kaalai	Gopalakrishnan		
1995	Kattumarakaran	Muthazhagu		
1995	Pasumpon	Thangapandi		
1995	Chinna Vathiyar	Chandramouli & Aravind		
1995	Periya Kudumbam	Rathnavel		
1995	Mr. Madras	Murugan		
1995	Seethanam	Muthu Manikkam		
1996	Parambarai	Paramasivam		
1996	Sivasakthi	Sakthi		
1996	Panchalankurichi	Kichcha		
1997	Periya Thambi	Siva		
1997	Mappillai Gounder	Subramaniyam (Mappillai Gounder)		
1997	Thedinen Vanthathu	Velumani / Coimbatore Gopalakrishnan		
1998	Ponmanam	Anandhan		
1998	Iniyavale	Prabhakar		
1998	En Uyir Nee Thaane	Vasu		
1999	Kummi Paattu	Kanagarasu		
1999	Suyamvaram	Aavudayappan		
1999	Thirupathi Ezhumalai Venkatesa	Venkatesan		
1999	Poovellam Kettuppar	Himself	Cameo appearance	
1999	Manam Virumbuthe Unnai	Shanmugam		
2000	Thirunelveli	Thulasi		
2000	Thai Porandachu	Giri		
2000	Kandha Kadamba Kathir Vela	Kandhan		
2000	Budget Padmanabhan	Padmanabhan		
2000	Vanna Thamizh Pattu	Vijaya Raghunatha Bhoopathy Raja & Rathnavel Raghunatha Bhoopathy Raja		
2001	Thaalikaatha Kaaliamman	Chandrabose		
2001	Middle Class Madhavan	Madhavan		
2001	Super Kudumbam	Arun		
2001	Mitta Miraasu	Chellaiya		
2002	Charlie Chaplin	Ramakrishnan	Tamil Nadu State Film Special Award for Best Actor	
2003	Yes Madam	Sivaramakrishnan		
2003	Banda Paramasivam	Paraman		
2004	Vasool Raja MBBS	Vaddi		
2005	Chandramukhi	Senthilnathan		
2006	Pasa Kiligal	Sethupathi		
2006	Kusthi	Jeevanandham		
2006	Unnakum Ennakum	Muthuppandi		
2007	Thaamirabharani	Saravana Perumal		
2007	Vegam	DSP Kumaravel		
2007	Billa	DSP Jayaprakash		
2008	Kuselan	Senthilnathan IPS	Guest appearance	
2008	Silambaattam	Muthuvel		
2009	A Aa E Ee	Subramaniam		
2009	Ayan	Aarumuga Daas	Nominated, Filmfare Award for Best Supporting Actor – Tamil	
2009	Malai Malai	Pazhanivel		
2009	Kanthasaamy	Paranthaman IPS	Partially reshot in Telugu as Mallanna	
2010	Aasal	Mirasi		
2010	Thambikku Indha Ooru	Kumaraswamy		
2010	Maanja Velu	DIG Gautham Ganesh	Guest appearance	
2010	Magane En Marumagane	Himself	Guest appearance	
2010	Raavanan	Singarasan		
2010	Thillalangadi	Krishna's father	Uncredited role	
2011	Thambikottai	Shanmugam		
2011	Aadu Puli	Bhagyanathan		
2011	Ponnar Shankar	Chozha Mannan		
2011	Sankarankovil	Muthuvel		
2012	3	Ram's father		
2012	Mirattal	Shankar Dhadha		
2013	All in All Azhagu Raja	Muthukrishnan		
2014	Ennamo Nadakkuthu	Parthiban		
2014	Yennamo Yedho	Chakravarthy		
2014	Uyirukku Uyiraga	Rangasamy		
2014	Kayal	Ramkumar	Guest appearance	
2015	Aambala	Aalavandhan		
2015	Kaaki Sattai	Inspector Sathyamurthy		
2015	Sakalakala Vallavan	Shakthi's father		
2015	Puli	Vembunathan	Cameo appearance	
2016	Theri	Commissioner Sibi Chakravarthi		
2016	Vetrivel	Rajamanikam		
2016	Unnodu Ka	Jayavel		
2016	Meen Kuzhambum Mann Paanaiyum	Annamalai	200th Film	
2017	Mupparimanam	Himself	Cameo appearance	
2017	7 Naatkal	Vijay Raghunath		
2017	Yaar Ivan	Jagannathan		
2018	Mannar Vagaiyara	Aiya / Govindaraja Mooriyar		
2018	Abhiyum Anuvum	Prabhu	Dubbed in Malayalam as Abhiyude Kadha Anuvinteyum	
2018	Saamy 2	G. Viswanathan		
2018	Utharavu Maharaja	Arun Bose		
2018	Johnny	Jaishankar		
2019	Charlie Chaplin 2	Ramakrishnan		
2019	Vantha Rajavathaan Varuven	Prakash		
2020	College Kumar	Thiru Kumaran		
2021	Velan	'Thillaiyar' Palanisamy		
2022	Kaathuvaakula Rendu Kaadhal	Prabhu		
2022	The Legend	Pugazhenthi		
2022	Naane Varuvean	Psychiatrist		
2022	Ponniyin Selvan: I	Periya Vellar Boothi Vikramakesari		
2022	Laththi	DIG Kamal		
2023	Varisu	Dr. Anand Padmanabhan		
2023	Ponniyin Selvan: II	Periya Vellar Boothi Vikramakesari		
2023	Raavana Kottam	Bose		
2023	Kathar Basha Endra Muthuramalingam	Kathar Bhai		
2024	PT Sir	Adv. Manickavel		
2025	Nesippaya	Gautham		
2025	Good Bad Ugly	Jayaprakash		
2025	Rajaputhiran	Chellaiah		
2025	Kiss	Ancient book decipherer		
2026	Hi	Indhiran		
2026	Sandakkari	Vetri's father		

Key
†	Denotes films that have not yet been released

==== Telugu films ====
List of Prabhu Telugu film credits
Year	Film	Role	Notes
2008	Kathanayakudu	SP Satya	Simultaneously shot alongside Kuselan; Guest appearance
2010	Darling	Hanumantha Rao	
2010	Orange	Jaanu's father	Dubbed into Tamil as Ramcharan
2011	Shakthi	Mahadevaraya	
2011	Bejawada	Kaali Prasad	
2012	Daruvu	Yama	
2012	Tuneega Tuneega	"Madurai" Ramaswamy	
2012	Uu Kodathara? Ulikki Padathara?	Rayudu	
2012	Dhenikaina Ready	Veera Narasimha Naidu	
2013	Ongole Githa	Narayana	
2017	Veedevadu	Jagannath	
2022	Ranga Ranga Vaibhavanga	Ramu	

==== Malayalam films ====
List of Prabhu Kannada film credits
Year	Film	Role	Notes
1996	Kaalapani	Mukund Iyengar	Dubbed in Tamil as Siraichalai
2002	Malayali Mamanu Vanakkam	Periyakulam Kannayya	Dubbed in Tamil as Gounder Veetu Mapillai
2003	War and Love	Lt. Col. Sarathchandran	Dubbed in Tamil as Kalam
2004	Kanninum Kannadikkum	Himself	Guest appearance
2010	Pramani	Varkichan Joseph	Guest appearance
2010	Best of Luck	Vinayaka Naickar	
2013	Dracula 2012	Robinson	Dubbed into Tamil as Naangam Pirai
2021	Marakkar: Arabikadalinte Simham	Thangudu	

==== Kannada films ====
List of Prabhu Kannada film credits
Year	Film	Role	Notes
2011	Boss	Sethunathan Iyer	
2014	Drishya	Chandrashekar	
2014	Power	Krishna Prasad	
2019	Ayushman Bhava	Ram Kumar	
2021	Drishya 2	Chandrashekhar	

==== English film ====
List of Prabhu English film credits
Year	Film	Role	Notes
1995	Ele, My Friend		Cameo appearance
