= K. Balaji =

Indian producer and actor (1934–2009)

- Born: Krishnamachari Balaje; 24 June 1934; Madras, Madras Presidency, British India (present day Tamil Nadu, India)
- Died: 2 May 2009 (aged 74); Chennai, Tamil Nadu, India
- Other name: Villain Balaji
- Education: Bachelor of Arts; Bachelor of Laws
- Occupations: Film producer; actor
- Years active: 1951–2009
- Known for: Billa (1980)
- Spouse: Anandavalli (died 1996)
- Children: Suresh Balaje; Sujatha; Suchitra Mohanlal
- Parent(s): Krishnamachari; Janaki Devi
- Relatives: T. Rangachari (grandfather); Mohanlal (son-in-law); Pranav Mohanlal (grandson); Yecha Gunja Rajalakshmi (cousin); Y. G. Mahendra (nephew)

Krishnamachari Balaji (24 June 1934 – 2 May 2009) was an Indian film producer and actor. He was a prominent actor in the 1960s and 1970s, playing lead, supporting and antagonist roles. He appeared in many films featuring Sivaji Ganesan.

== Early life ==
Balaji was born to Krishnamachari and Janaki Devi in Madras, Madras Presidency. His paternal side is of Tamil Iyengar Brahmin heritage and maternal side from Kerala. He was the grandson of colonial era advocate T. Rangachari. He started acting at an early age, when he performed in school plays and amateur theatre shows.

== Career ==
Balaji contacted S. S. Vasan, then owner of Gemini Studios, in 1951, looking for work. He was offered a minor role in Auvaiyar, in which he played the Hindu god Muruga.

Balaji transitioned into playing a villain's role or the hero's understudy with a negative angle in films that included Padithaal Mattum Podhumaa, Bale Pandiya, En Kadamai and Thillana Mohanambal.

While working as an actor, he was hired as a manager in Narasu Studios in the southwest suburbs. In the 1960s, after coming into contact with top Hindi actors such as Ashok Kumar, Dilip Kumar and Tamil stars Sivaji Ganesan, Gemini Ganesan and actress Savithri, he began to remake Hindi hits in Tamil. His first production was Annavin Aasai, a remake of Chand Aur Sooraj directed by Dulal Guha. The debut production film starred Gemini Ganesan and Savithri in the lead.

He then went on to remake popular Hindi films such as Dushman (1971) and Namak Haraam (1973) both starring Rajesh Khanna, Deewaar (1975), and Qurbani.

He founded Sujatha Cine Arts in 1966. He was also the founder of Sujatha Recording Studio, where sound recordings for most of the big-budget movies of the 1980s and '90s were done.

In 1979, began to produce films in Hindi, including the successful Amardeep.

== Family ==
His wife Anandavalli died in 1996. The couple had three children, Suresh Balaje, Sujatha and Suchitra Mohanlal. Malayalam superstar Mohanlal is his son-in-law. He was also the grandfather of Pranav Mohanlal and Suraj Suresh. The comedian Y. G. Mahendran is his nephew through his cousin sister Rajalakshmi Parthasarathy.

== Death ==
Balaji died on 2 May 2009 evening due to multiple organ and kidney failure. He had been hospitalised for over a month.

== Partial filmography ==
=== As producer ===
Year	Film	Director	Notes
1966	Annavin Aasai	Dada Mirasi	Remake of Hindi film Chand Aur Suraj
1967	Thangai	A. C. Tirulokchandar	
1968	En Thambi	A. C. Tirulokchandar	Remake of Telugu film Aastiparulu
1969	Thirudan	A. C. Tirulokchandar	Remake of Telugu film Adrushtavanthalu
1970	Engirundho Vandhaal	A. C. Tirulokchandar	Remake of Telugu film Punarjanma
1972	Raja	C. V. Rajendran	Remake of Hindi film Johny Mera Naam
1972	Needhi	C. V. Rajendran	Remake of Hindi film Dushman
1974	En Magan	C. V. Rajendran	Remake of Hindi film Be-Imaan
1976	Unakkaga Naan	C. V. Rajendran	Remake of Hindi film Namak Haraam
1977	Dheepam	K. Vijayan	Remake of Malayalam film Theekkanal
1978	Thyagam	K. Vijayan	Remake of Hindi film Amanush
1978	Nallathoru Kudumbam	K. Vijayan	Remake of Telugu film Alumagalu
1979	Amar Deep	R. Krishnamoorthy, K. Vijayan	Remake of Tamil film Dheepam
1980	Sujatha	K. Vijayan	Remake of Malayalam movie Shalini Ente Kootukari
1980	Billa	R. Krishnamoorthy	Remake of Hindi film Don
1981	Thee	R. Krishnamoorthy	Remake of Hindi film Deewaar
1981	Savaal	R. Krishnamoorthy	Remake of Hindi film Haath Ki Safai
1982	Vazhvey Maayam	R. Krishnamoorthy	Remake of Telugu film Premabhishekham
1982	Theerpu	R. Krishnamoorthy	Remake of Malayalam film Ithihasam
1983	Sattam	K. Vijayan	Remake of Hindi film Dostana
1983	Neethibathi	R. Krishnamoorthy	Remake of Telugu film Justice Chowdary
1984	Vidhi	K. Vijayan	Remake of Telugu film Nyayam Kavali
1984	Niraparaadhi	K. Vijayan	Remake of Hindi film Be Abroo
1985	Bandham	K. Vijayan	Remake of Malayalam film Chakkarayumma
1985	Kaaval	K. Vijayan	Remake of Hindi film Ardh Satya
1985	Mangamma Sapatham	K. Vijayan	Remake of Hindi film Kasam Paida Karne Wali Ki
1986	Marumagal	Karthick Raghunath	Remake of Hindi film Dulhan Wahi Jo Piya Man Bhaye
1986	Viduthalai	K. Vijayan	Remake of Hindi film Qurbani
1987	Kudumbam Oru Koyil	A. C. Tirulokchandar	Remake of Hindi film Ghar Dwaar
1987	Vairakkiyam	K. Vijayan	Remake of Telugu film Anasuyamma Gari Alludu
1989	En Rathathin Rathame	K. Vijayan, Sundar K. Vijayan	Remake of Hindi film Mr. India
1989	Dravidan	R. Krishnamoorthy	Remake of Malayalam filmAryan
1989	Kuttravali	Raja	Remake of Hindi film Kaal Chakra

=== As actor ===
Year	Film	Character/Role	Notes
1956	Madhurkula Manickam		Tamil film
1958	Anbu Engey	Ramu	Tamil film
1959	Uthami Petra Rathinam		Tamil film
1959	Sahodhari		Tamil film
1960	Engal Selvi		Tamil film
1960	Mahalakshmi		Tamil film
1960	Vidivelli		Tamil film
1960	Pudhiya Pathai		Tamil film
1960	Parthiban Kanavu		Tamil film
1960	Paavai Vilakku		Tamil film
1961	Naaga Nandhini		Tamil film
1961	Kappalottiya Thamizhan		Tamil film
1961	Mamiyarum Oru Veetu Marumagale		Tamil film
1961	Thooya Ullam		Tamil film
1962	Policekaran Magal		Tamil film
1962	Bale Pandiya	Ravi	Tamil film
1962	Padithaal Mattum Podhuma	Raju	Tamil film
1962	Ellorum Vazhavendum		Tamil film
1962	Sumaithaangi		Tamil film
1963	Aasai Alaigal		Tamil film
1963	Ezhai Pangalan		Tamil film
1963	Iruvar Ullam		Tamil film
1964	En Kadamai		Tamil film
1964	Karuppu Panam		Tamil film
1964	Aandavan Kattalai		Tamil film
1964	Rishyasringar		Tamil film
1964	School Master	Murali	Malayalam film
1964	Atom Bomb	Kochuraghavan Pillai	Malayalam film
1965	Anbu Karangal		Tamil film
1965	Veera Abhimanyu		Tamil film
1965	Vaazhkai Padagu	Kannabiram	Tamil film
1965	Kaattu Rani		Tamil film
1966	Annavin Aasai		Tamil film
1967	Pattanathil Bhootham		Tamil film
1967	Maadi Veettu Mappilai		Tamil film
1967	Thangai		Tamil film
1967	Iruttinte Athmavu	Chandran	Malayalam film
1967	Adhey Kangal	Doctor	Tamil film
1968	Lakshmi Kalyanam	Lakshmi's husband	Tamil film
1968	Ragini		Malayalam film
1968	En Thambi	Viswam	Tamil film
1968	Thillana Mohanambal		Tamil film
1969	Shanti Nilayam		Tamil film
1969	Thirudan	Jagannath	Tamil film
1969	Gurudhakshaneiy		Tamil film
1970	Enga Mama	Muralikrishnan	Tamil film
1970	Engirundho Vandhaal		Tamil film
1970	Ethirkalam		Tamil film
1970	Sorgam		Tamil film
1971	Veguli Penn		Tamil film
1971	Babu	Sankar	Tamil film
1972	Vasantha Maligai		Tamil film
1972	Kannamma		Tamil film
1972	Thaikku Oru Pillai		Tamil film
1972	Raja	Chandran/Babu	Tamil film
1972	Neethi		Tamil film
1974	En Magan	Jagadesh	Tamil film
1975	Aayirathil Oruthi	Gopi	Tamil film
1975	Swamy Ayyappan		Malayalam film
1976	Vazhvu En Pakkam	Moorthy	Tamil film
1978	Thyagam		Tamil film
1979	Surakshaa	Doctor Shiva	Hindi film
1979	Amar Deep	Guest Appearance	Hindi film
1980	Billa		Tamil film
1980	Jhonny	Police Officer	Tamil film
1981	Thee	Jagdish	Tamil film
1981	Savaal	Baba Sheak	Tamil film
1983	Justice Raja	Commissioner	Malayalam film
1983	Sattam		Tamil film
1986	Viduthalai		Tamil film
