= My Name is Billa =

"My Name is Billa" may refer to:

- "My Name is Billa", a song on the soundtrack of the 1980 film Billa
  - "My Name is Billa", a song on the soundtrack of the 2007 film Billa, a remix of the 1980 song
- "My Name is Billa", a song on the soundtrack the 2009 film Billa
