= R. Krishnamoorthy =

Indian film director

- Other name: Billa Krishnamoorthy
- Occupation: Director

R. Krishnamoorthy was an Indian film director and screenwriter who worked on Tamil films. Most active in the 1980s, he is best known for directing Rajinikanth in Billa (1980) and Kamal Haasan in Vaazhvey Maayam (1982).

== Career ==
Throughout his career, Krishnamoorthy regularly worked on productions by K. Balaji, Suresh Balaje and their Suresh Arts banner.

The success of the film Billa (1980) starring Rajinikanth, prompted the director to become widely dubbed as "Billa" Krishnamoorthy in the film industry. He later went on to collaborate again with Rajinikanth in Thee (1981), while making successful films such as Savaal (1981) and Vaazhvey Maayam (1982) with Kamal Haasan.

In the 1980s, he made several films with Sivaji Ganesan or his son Prabhu, including Neethibathi (1983), Thiruppam (1984) and Nyaayam (1984).

== Filmography ==
Director

Year	Film	Language	Notes
1978	Radhai Ketra Kannan	Tamil	
1979	Amar Deep	Hindi	
1980	Billa	Tamil	Nominated, Filmfare Award for Best Director – Tamil
1981	Savaal	Tamil	
1981	Thee	Tamil	
1982	Murai Ponnu	Tamil	
1982	Vaazhvey Maayam	Tamil	
1982	Theerpu	Tamil	
1983	Neethibathi	Tamil	
1983	Imaigal	Tamil	
1983	Justice Raja	Malayalam	
1984	Thiruppam	Tamil	
1984	Vamsa Vilakku	Tamil	
1984	Nerupukkul Eeram	Tamil	
1984	Nyayam	Tamil	
1985	Nermai	Tamil	
1985	Deivapiravi	Tamil	
1985	Naam Iruvar	Tamil	
1986	Annai En Dheivam	Tamil	
1987	Thangachi	Tamil	
1988	Ponnaniyathi	Malayalam	
1988	Thaai Paasam	Tamil	
1989	Dravidan	Tamil	
1989	Enga Annan Varattum	Tamil	
1990	Vaazhnthu Kaattuvom	Tamil	
1991	Vetri Karangal	Tamil	
1993	Karpagam Vanthachu	Tamil	
