= Ragini (film) =

- Directed by: P. B. Unni
- Written by: Vaikkom Chandrasekharan Nair
- Screenplay by: Vaikkom Chandrasekharan Nair
- Produced by: K. N. Moorhty
- Starring: Madhu; K. Balaji; K. R. Vijaya; Sankaradi
- Cinematography: C. Chandran
- Edited by: R. Devarajan; VP Krishnan
- Music by: Alleppey Usman
- Production company: Ravi Movies
- Distributed by: Ravi Movies
- Release date: 13 September 1968
- Country: India
- Language: Malayalam

Ragini is a 1968 Indian Malayalam film, directed by P. B. Unni and produced by K. N. Moorhty. The film stars Madhu, K. Balaji, K. R. Vijaya and Sankaradi in the lead roles. The film had musical score by Alleppey Usman.

== Cast ==
- Madhu
- K. Balaji
- K. R. Vijaya
- Sankaradi
- Adoor Pankajam
- Bahadoor
- Jyothi

== Soundtrack ==
The music was composed by Alleppey Usman and the lyrics were written by Latha Vaikkam.

No.	Song	Singers	Lyrics	Length (m:ss)
1	"Aavani Mulla"	S. Janaki	Latha Vaikkam	
2	"Anantha Kodi"	S. Janaki	Latha Vaikkam	
3	"Ekathaarake"	K. P. Udayabhanu	Latha Vaikkam	
4	"Ithirikkaatte"	Kamalam	Latha Vaikkam	
5	"Kaananathadi"	K. P. Udayabhanu	Latha Vaikkam	
6	"Kadalippoovin"	K. J. Yesudas, S. Janaki	Latha Vaikkam	
7	"Kinaavu Kettiya"	K. J. Yesudas	Latha Vaikkam	
8	"Nimisham Thorum"	S. Janaki	Latha Vaikkam	
