= Yedanthasthula Meda =

- Theatrical release poster
- Directed by: Dasari Narayana Rao
- Written by: Dasari Narayana Rao
- Produced by: Y. Arun Prasanna
- Starring: Akkineni Nageswara Rao; Sujatha; Jaya Sudha
- Cinematography: P. S. Selvaraj
- Edited by: K. Balu
- Music by: Chakravarthy
- Production company: Jhansi Enterprises
- Release date: 11 January 1980
- Running time: 157 minutes
- Country: India
- Language: Telugu

Yedanthasthula Meda (transl. Seven Storied Building) is a 1980 Indian Telugu-language drama film, produced under the Jhansi Enterprises banner and directed by Dasari Narayana Rao. It stars Akkineni Nageswara Rao, Sujatha and Jaya Sudha, with music composed by Chakravarthy. The film was remade in Hindi as Pyaasa Sawan (1981) and in Tamil as Maadi Veettu Ezhai (1981).

== Plot ==
The film begins with Ranga Rao, an unemployed young man. One day, a tycoon, Prabhakar Rao, mistakenly believes Ranga Rao to be the son of a tycoon friend and offers him a job without asking questions. He even plans to marry his daughter, Janaki, to Ranga Rao.

Eventually, the truth is revealed, but despite opposition from their elders, Ranga Rao and Janaki get married. However, they soon go through a tough time and face social humiliation. Hence, distressed Ranga Rao decides to seek revenge, builds a vast empire through hard labor, and the couple is blessed with a baby boy Venu.

== Cast ==
- Akkineni Nageswara Rao as Ranga Rao & Venu (Dual role)
- Sujatha as Janaki
- Jaya Sudha as Sudha
- Jaya Prada as Special appearance
- Jaggayya as Jananatham
- Prabhakar Reddy as Prabhakar Rao
- K. V. Chalam as Manager
- Athili Lakshmi as Janaki's mother
- Jhansi as Lakshmi

== Soundtrack ==
Music composed by Chakravarthy.

Song title	Lyrics	Singers	Length
"Arati Pandu"	Rajasri	S. P. Balasubrahmanyam, P. Susheela	4:50
"Chakkani Chukka"	Veturi	S. P. Balasubrahmanyam, P. Susheela	4:50
"Kommaloni"	Veturi	S. P. Balasubrahmanyam, P. Susheela	4:20
"O Rangi Koorangi"	C. Narayana Reddy	S. P. Balasubrahmanyam, P. Susheela	4:00
"Id Megha Sandesamo"	Rajasri	S. P. Balasubrahmanyam, P. Susheela	5:05
"Edanthasthula Meda Idi"	Veturi	P. Susheela	4:04
"Edanthasthula Meda Idi"	Veturi	S. P. Balasubrahmanyam	3:30
