= Thee (1981 film) =

- Theatrical release poster
- Directed by: R. Krishnamoorthy
- Written by: A. L. Narayanan (dialogues)
- Based on: Deewaar by Salim–Javed
- Produced by: Suresh Balaje
- Starring: Rajinikanth; Suman; Sowcar Janaki; Sripriya
- Cinematography: N. Balakrishnan
- Edited by: V. Chakrapani
- Music by: M. S. Viswanathan
- Production company: Suresh Arts
- Release date: 26 January 1981
- Running time: 160 minutes
- Country: India
- Language: Tamil

Thee (transl. Fire) is a 1981 Indian Tamil-language action crime film directed R. Krishnamoorthy. The film stars Rajinikanth plays the lead role and Suman plays the role of his brother. It is a remake of the 1975 Hindi film Deewaar, written by Salim–Javed. The film was a huge hit.

== Plot ==
The film opens with the strong leadership of a trade unionist, who works hard to enhance the lives of struggling labourers. He lives in a modest home with his wife, Seetha, and their two young sons, Raja and Ravi. The trade unionist, however, is blackmailed by a corrupt businessman who threatens to kill his family if he does not cease his activities. Forced into compliance, the trade unionist is thus attacked by the very same labourers who once supported him. His family is also persecuted by the angry workers who brand young Raja's arm with the words: "My Father Is A Thief." The trade unionist then runs away, forcing Seetha and her two children into destitute poverty. Not knowing what else to do, Seetha brings her children to Madras and struggles as a day labourer to care for her now homeless boys.

Raja, the elder brother, grows up with an acute awareness of his father's failure and is victimised for his father's supposed misdeeds. In the process of fighting for his rights, Raja, who starts out as a boot polisher and becomes a dockyard worker in his youth, becomes a smuggler and a leading figure of the underworld. He also sacrifices his own education so his brother Ravi can study. Ravi is an excellent student and grows up to become an upright police officer. He is also dating Radha, the daughter of the Commissioner of Police. On the Commissioner's suggestion, Ravi applies for employment with the police, and is sent for training. Several months later, he is accepted by the police, and has a rank of Sub-Inspector. Raja, meanwhile, becomes involved with Anita, a woman whom he meets at a bar. When Anita becomes pregnant, Raja decides to abandon his life in the underworld, marry her, and confess his sins. He also hopes to seek forgiveness from his mother and brother.

When Ravi returns home, he finds that Raja has become a businessman overnight, has accumulated wealth, and a palatial home. When Ravi finds out that Raja has acquired wealth by crime, he decides to move out along with his mother. One of his first assignments is to apprehend and arrest some of Madras' hardcore criminals and smugglers which includes his brother, Raja — much to his shock, as he had never associated his very own brother of having any criminal background. Ravi must now decide to proceed on with apprehending Raja, or quit from the police force. However, when Anita is brutally murdered by rival members of the underworld, Raja loses all sense of rational behaviour and brutally murders his rivals in revenge for Anita's death, leading him to be branded a criminal forever. Their mother, who had sided with Ravi despite the fact that Raja was her favourite, is tormented by Raja's decisions and rejects him. The two brothers meet for a final showdown, where Ravi kills Raja. Raja dies in his mother's arms seeking forgiveness and Ravi is awarded for pursuing justice.

== Cast ==
- Rajinikanth as Rajshekhar "Raja"
- Suman as Inspector Ravishankar "Ravi"
- Sowcar Janaki as Seetha
- Sripriya as Radha
- Shoba as Anantlakshmi 'Anita'
- Major Sundarrajan as Commissioner of Police, Radha's father
- Thengai Srinivasan as Raheem Bhai
- R. S. Manohar as Madanagopal
- A. V. M. Rajan as Ramaiah
- S. A. Ashokan as Madanagopal's boss (guest appearance)
- V. Gopalakrishnan as Michael
- K. Balaji as Jagdish
- Manorama as Inspector Mohana (guest appearance)
- Ceylon Manohar as Henchman
- T. K. S. Natarajan
- Aruna Irani as a Dancer

== Soundtrack ==
Music was composed by M. S. Viswanathan, with lyrics by Kannadasan.

Track listing
No.	Title	Singer(s)	Length
1.	"Subbanna Sonnaranna"	Malaysia Vasudevan, S. N. Surendar, Kovai Soundararajan	4:28
2.	"Vaare Vaa idhu"	L. R. Eswari	4:33
3.	"Ayyavukku Manasu Irukku"	P. Jayachandran, Vani Jairam	4:24
Total length:			13:25

== Reception ==
Nalini Shastry of Kalki called it a scene by scene remake of Deewar and added since many of the scenes reminds of Deewar, director Krishnamurthy gets minus for it. She however praised the acting of cast including the child actor who portrayed the younger version of Rajinikanth and also praised Balakrishnan's cinematography.

== In popular culture ==
In Mankatha (2011), Prem (Premgi Amaren) is saved by Raja's 786 badge during an imaginary sequence in which Vinayak Mahadev (Ajith Kumar) shoots him with a gun.
