= Savaal =

1981 film directed by R. Krishnamoorthy

- Theatrical release poster
- Directed by: R. Krishnamoorthy
- Written by: A. L. Narayanan (dialogues)
- Story by: Salim–Javed
- Produced by: Anandavalli Balaji; Suresh Balajie; Suchithra Balaji; Sujatha Balaji
- Starring: Kamal Haasan; Jaishankar; Vijayakumar; Sripriya; Lakshmi
- Cinematography: K. S. Prasad
- Edited by: V. Chakrapani
- Music by: M. S. Viswanathan
- Production company: Sujatha Cine Arts
- Release date: 3 July 1981
- Running time: 146 minutes
- Country: India
- Language: Tamil

Savaal (transl. Challenge) is a 1981 Indian Tamil-language masala film directed by R. Krishnamoorthy, starring Kamal Haasan, Jaishankar, Vijayakumar, Sripriya and Lakshmi. The film was released on 3 July 1981 and did well at the box office. It is a remake of the Hindi film Haath Ki Safai (1974).

== Plot ==
Brothers Shankar and Raja lose their mother. For survival, they plan to go to the city via a goods train. However at a junction, they get split and lead separate lives. Shankar grows up to be a smuggler while Raja becomes a petty pickpocketing criminal. Radha, a wealthy girl, falls in love in Raja. How Shankar and Raja get united forms the story.

== Cast ==
- Kamal Haasan as Raja
- Jaishankar as Shankar
- Vijayakumar as Ranjith
- Sripriya as Radha
- Lakshmi as Ganga
- S. A. Ashokan as Jail inmate (cameo)
- Thengai Srinivasan as Radha's guardian
- Y. G. Mahendran as Johnny
- Balaji as Baba sheak
- Manorama as "Burma" Pappa
- V. Gopalakrishnan as Gopi Shankar's Henchman
- Ceylon Manohar as Henchman

== Soundtrack ==
The music was composed by M. S. Viswanathan.

Track listing
| No. | Title | Lyrics | Singer(s) | Length |
|---|---|---|---|---|
| 1. | "Theriyum Theriyum" | Vairamuthu | S. P. Balasubrahmanyam, P. Susheela |
| 2. | "Naadinen Nambinen Kadhalukku Nyayamillai" | Kannadasan | Vani Jairam |
| 3. | "Thanniye Pottaa" | Kannadasan | Kamal Haasan, Kalyani Menon, Sripriya |
| 4. | "Kai Nalla Kaiyappa" | Kannadasan | Malaysia Vasudevan, Manorama, Kovai Soundarajan |

== Reception ==
Nalini Sastri of Kalki called the film an entertaining masala fare.
