= Vaazhvey Maayam =

- Theatrical release poster
- Directed by: R. Krishnamoorthy
- Written by: A. L. Narayanan (dialogues)
- Story by: Dasari Narayana Rao
- Based on: Premabhishekam
- Produced by: Suresh Balaje; K. Balaji; B. Anandavalli; Sujatha Balaji; Suchithra Balaji
- Starring: Kamal Haasan; Sridevi; Sripriya
- Cinematography: N. Balakrishnan
- Edited by: V. Chakrapani
- Music by: Gangai Amaran
- Production company: Suresh Arts
- Release date: 26 January 1982
- Running time: 158 minutes
- Country: India
- Language: Tamil

Vaazhvey Maayam (transl. Life is an illusion) is a 1982 Indian Tamil-language romantic drama film directed by R. Krishnamoorthy, starring Kamal Haasan, Sridevi and Sripriya. It is a remake of the 1981 Telugu film Premabhishekam. The film was released on 26 January 1982, and ran for over 200 days in theatres.

== Plot ==
Rajasekaran is a spoiled brat from a rich family. He always takes advantage of his mother's affection and this irritates his father. He is a member of a flight club and does many aerial stunts in his plane. He gets attracted to an air-hostess named Devi, When Raja tries to woo her, she gets irritated and insults him. Raja decides to pursue her regardless. He finds out that Devi is an acquaintance of his friend Prathap. Raja is delighted at this since he can get to Devi through his friend Prathap. Prathap does not like this as he wants to marry Devi but has not proposed to her yet. Raja keeps trying to impress Devi and follows her wherever she goes. Raja visits her home and tries to impress her family. Devi and her elder brother, Shankar do not like this. Raja befriends Devi's friend, a senior air-hostess named Baby, who is a spinster. Baby likes Raja and helps him to win Devi's love. She tells him to romance another girl to make Devi jealous. She seeks the help of Radha, a former air-hostess who became a prostitute after being deceived and raped by a man. Raja pretends to be in love with her but the plan does not work. Devi gets more annoyed with him.

Raja's parents fix Raja's marriage much against his wishes. Raja's mother persuades him to come and meet the girl, Sandhiya for his father's sake. She promises to help him with rejecting the proposal. Raja meets the girl and hallucinates that she is Devi. In his confusion, he accepts the marriage proposal. The next day when Sandhiya comes to meet him he understands his mistake and lets her know. This hurts her and she decides to kill herself. Raja stops Sandhiya and says he will marry her if it means saving her life. She understands his problem. Raja promises that he will not get married until she finds someone to marry. Soon after, Sandhiya's marriage is fixed and she invites Raja to the wedding. Sandhiya is also a friend of Devi's and she invites her for the wedding too. On the day of wedding Devi sees Raja and gets angry. She insults him thinking that he has followed her to the wedding and Raja is hurt by her words. Raja's friends vow revenge on Devi for her behaviour. Raja becomes despondent and flies his plane non-stop. His friends get scared. They call Devi to stop him. Devi, who already has feelings for him, rushes to stop him and accepts his love.

Prathap, without knowing about Raja and Devi's relationship, proposes to Devi but she does not reciprocate. Shankar wants his sister to marry Prathap but all other family members including Devi favour Raja. Shankar accepts their love and the couple get engaged. Raja and Devi start inviting people to their wedding. Devi visits Sandhiya's house and gets shocked to see that she has been widowed. Devi is told that Sandhiya's husband was terminally ill but his family concealed the truth. Devi gets angry and curses men for being so selfish. Raja gets admitted to the hospital and is diagnosed with cancer, however, he is not told that. Shankar, who is a doctor there, postpones the wedding citing some horoscope issues. Raja is angered by this and feels that he is intentionally trying to delay their marriage. He asks Devi to come to a temple and marry him. On the day of wedding at the temple, Raja coughs up blood and his friend Baby takes him to the hospital. They learn that Raja has terminal cancer.

Devi waits at the temple for Raja but leaves when he does not show up. Raja watches her leave from afar. Meanwhile, Prathap attempts to kill himself on seeing the wedding invitation of Raja and Devi. Raja overhears Prathap speaking to Shankar about his love for her. Raja decides to end his relationship with Devi so that she can start a new life with Prathap. Raja starts drinking heavily and moves in with Radha. Devi is shocked by Raja's behaviour and tries to bring him back. But Raja pretends that his marriage proposal to Devi was his revenge as Devi had insulted him at her friend's wedding. He says now no man will accept Devi as his wife. Devi gets angry and urges her brother get her married to anyone so that she can teach Raja a lesson. Her brother fixes her marriage with Prathap. Radha requests Raja to marry her. She says she wants the world to remember her not as a prostitute, rather as someone's wife. Raja marries her. Devi marries Prathap and she wants to go to Raja to show him. Baby tells her about Raja's illness and why he behaved the way he did. Devi is shocked and rushes to meet Raja. Raja's parents also come to know about this and come to see him. Raja sees Devi as a bride and takes his last breath happily.

== Cast ==
- Kamal Haasan as Rajasekaran
- Sridevi as Sridevi / Devi
- Sripriya as Radha
- Jaishankar as Shankar
- Ambika as Sandhiya
- Prathap Pothan as Prathap
- Manorama as Baby
- Junior Balaiah as Rajasekaran's Friend
- V. Gopalakrishnan as Rajasekaran's friend
- Krishnamoorthy as Rajasekaran's Friend
- G. Srinivasan as Saminathan Sasthri
- K. Balaji as Doctor
- Sukumari as Rajasekaran's mother
- Aranmula Ponnamma
- P. K. Abraham
- Nalini
- Nalinikanth
- Ilavarasi as Saminathan Sasthri's daughter (uncredited)

== Soundtrack ==
The music was composed by Gangai Amaran and lyrics were written by Vaali. The song "Neelavaana Odayil" is set in Abheri raga, while "Vandhanam En" is set in Vasantha. "Neela Vaana Odaiyil" was inspired by "Chupke Chupke", a ghazal composed by Ghulam Ali.

Track listing
No.	Title	Singer(s)	Length
1.	"Devi Sridevi Un Thiruvaai"	S. P. Balasubrahmanyam, Vani Jairam	4:58
2.	"En Rajavae"	S. P. Balasubrahmanyam, Kalyani Menon	4:21
3.	"Mazhai Kaala Megam Ondru"	S. P. Balasubrahmanyam, Vani Jairam	5:07
4.	"Neela Vana Odayil"	S. P. Balasubrahmanyam	4:09
5.	"Vanthanam En Vanthanam"	S. P. Balasubrahmanyam	5:11
6.	"Vazhvey Maayam Intha"	K. J. Yesudas	5:10
Total length:			28:56

== Reception ==
S. Shivakumar of Mid-Day praised the performances of the lead artistes, calling Haasan "subtle and restrained" and appreciated Sripriya who "walks off with the applause on the sheer strength of the dialogues she mouths". Thiraignani of Kalki also praised the performances of the lead artistes, saying Sridevi performed better than Sripriya. The film was dubbed into Malayalam under the title of the original Telugu film.
