= Justice Raja =

- Directed by: R. Krishnamoorthy
- Written by: Pappanamkodu Lakshmanan
- Screenplay by: Pappanamkodu Lakshmanan
- Starring: Prem Nazir; Menaka; Balan K. Nair; K. R. Vijaya
- Cinematography: K. S. Prasad
- Edited by: Chakrapani
- Music by: Gangai Amaran
- Production company: Sujatha Creations
- Distributed by: Sujatha Creations
- Release date: 28 January 1983
- Country: India
- Language: Malayalam

Justice Raja is a 1983 Indian Malayalam language film, directed by R. Krishnamoorthy. The film stars Prem Nazir, Menaka, Balan K. Nair and K. R. Vijaya. The film has musical score by Gangai Amaran. The film was a remake of Telugu film Justice Chowdary.

== Cast ==
- Prem Nazir as Rajashekharan, Gopi (double role)
- Menaka as Thulasi
- Balan K. Nair as Narendran, Nagendran (double role)
- K. R. Vijaya as Sreedevi
- Sujatha as Radha
- Sankaradi as Raman Nair
- P. K. Abraham as Rahim
- Adoor Bhasi as Adv. Sharma
- Sathyakala as Raji
- Mala Aravindan as Kuttappan
- Mohan Jose as Jagan
- Shanavas as Sankar
- Radhika as Anitha
- Silk Smitha as Dancer
- Lalu Alex as Shaji
- Kollam G. K. Pilla as Rajasekharan's father
- P. R. Menon as Menon
- Rajashekharan as Prasad

== Soundtrack ==
The music was composed by Gangai Amaran and the lyrics were written by Poovachal Khader.

No.	Song	Singers	Lyrics	Length (m:ss)
1	"Janmam Thorum"	K. J. Yesudas, S. Janaki	Poovachal Khader	
2	"Kanni Malare"	K. J. Yesudas, P. Susheela, S. P. Sailaja	Poovachal Khader	
3	"Mungaakkadal Muthum"	K. J. Yesudas, S. Janaki	Poovachal Khader	
4	"Police Namukku"	P. Jayachandran, Kalyani Menon	Poovachal Khader	
