= Maadi Veettu Ezhai =

1981 film by Amirtham

- Theatrical release poster
- Directed by: Amirtham
- Screenplay by: M. Karunanidhi
- Story by: Dasari Narayana Rao
- Produced by: Selvam
- Starring: Sivaji Ganesan; Sujatha; Sripriya
- Cinematography: Gajendramani
- Edited by: P. Venkateswar Rao
- Music by: M. S. Viswanathan
- Production company: Poompuhar Pictures
- Release date: 22 August 1981
- Country: India
- Language: Tamil

Maadi Veettu Ezhai (pronounced [maːɖi ʋiːʈʈːu eːɻaɪ] transl. The poor of the rich household) is a 1981 Indian Tamil-language film directed by Amirtham and written by M. Karunanidhi. The film stars Sivaji Ganesan, Sujatha and Sripriya. It is a remake of the Telugu film Yedanthasthula Meda. The film was released on 22 August 1981.

== Plot ==
The story highlights the importance of family over money. Paramanandhan is a poor person who gets a job and ends up marrying his boss' daughter. To provide her with the same lifestyle, he works day and night building a business empire. In the process, he completely neglects his wife and son only to find her terminally ill and him a happy-go-lucky irresponsible person.

The son, Mohan, is in love with the character played by Sripriya. They get married and live without worries. Paramanandhan decides to bring some changes in his son's life, hands over the business to him and leaves. He rushes back when he learns that his son has started to walk down his path and his daughter-in-law and his son are on the verge of divorce. He fixes their life again teaching them the importance of balance in life and that the real wealth is living a joyful life.

== Cast ==
- Sivaji Ganesan as Paramanandam / Mohan
- Sujatha as Lakshmi
- Sripriya
- V. K. Ramasamy
- Major Sundarrajan
- Nagesh

== Production ==
In 1966, M. G. Ramachandran and J. P. Chandrababu came together for a film titled Maadi Veettu Ezhai, to be directed by the latter. Although the film began shooting, it was shelved due to differences between the two. An unrelated film was later made with the same name, written by M. Karunanidhi and starring Sivaji Ganesan.

== Soundtrack ==
The music was composed by M. S. Viswanathan with lyrics by Vaali.

Song	Singers
"Anbu Enum Then Kalandhu"	T. M. Soundararajan
"Anbu Enum Then Kalandhu"	P. Susheela
"Padagu Veedugalil"	S. P. Balasubrahmanyam, P. Susheela
"Mutamizh Sandangal"	T. M. Soundararajan, Vani Jairam
"Anbu Enum Then Kalandhu" (pathos)	T. M. Soundararajan
"Inba Ulagathin Ellai Inge"	S. P. Balasubrahmanyam, S. Janaki

== Reception ==
Nalini Sastry of Kalki called it a film that supporters of Karunanidhi and fans of Ganesan will lose faith on them.

== Bibliography ==
- Kannan, R. (2017). MGR: A Life. India: Penguin Random House. ISBN 978-0-14-342934-0.
