= Vishwaroopam (1980 film) =

1980 film by A. C. Tirulokchandar

- Theatrical release poster
- Directed by: A. C. Tirulokchandar
- Written by: Aaroor Dass (dialogues)
- Screenplay by: A. C. Tirulokchandar
- Based on: Adalat
- Produced by: G. Hanumatha Rao
- Starring: Sivaji Ganesan; Sujatha; Sridevi
- Cinematography: M. Viswanath Rai
- Edited by: Kandhaswamy
- Music by: M. S. Viswanathan
- Production company: Padmalaya Pictures
- Release date: 6 November 1980
- Country: India
- Language: Tamil

Vishwaroopam (transl. The great form) is a 1980 Indian Tamil-language film directed by A. C. Tirulokchandar for Krishna's Padmalaya Pictures. The film stars Sivaji Ganesan, Sridevi and Sujatha. It is a remake of the 1976 Hindi film Adalat. The film was released on 6 November 1980.

== Plot ==
Sathyamoorthy is an innocent and honest hardworking villager. He helps Ashok, Rajan and their friend in a time of trouble, who offer him a lot of money in return. He insults them saying he did his duty and money isn't everything. However, fate plays a cruel turn making him desperate for money to treat his wife. He runs to them and they turn him into a criminal, much like them. He gains experience quickly, and soon usurps their dominance. His wife and son, Raja, however are unaware of his activities.

== Cast ==
- Sivaji Ganesan as Sathyamoorthy and Raja
- Sujatha as Savithri
- Sridevi as Geetha
- Major Sundarrajan as Rajan
- V. S. Raghavan
- R. S. Manohar as Ashok
- S. V. Ramadas as Prakash
- Prem Anand as Ramesh
- Thengai Srinivasan
- Manorama

== Soundtrack ==
The soundtrack was composed by M. S. Viswanathan.

Song's	Singer's	Lyric's
"Yenna Yaru Nenacha"	T. M. Soundararajan	Kannadasan
"Vazhkaiel Enakkor Puduragam"	S. P. Balasubrahmanyam	Vaali
"Naan Patta Kadan Ethnaiyo"	T. M. Soundararajan	Vaali
"Oh Miss"	S. P. Balasubrahmanyam	Pulamaipithan
"Rajathi Rajanukku"	T. M. Soundararajan, Vani Jairam	Vaali

== Release and reception ==
Vishwaroopam was released on 6 November 1980, Diwali day. Piousji of Sunday wrote, "Though Sivaji was rather impressive in the father's role he looked almost silly as the son." T. N. Krishnan, writing for Kalki, called the film a Vishwaroopam (great form) with regards to cast performances.
