= Billa (1980 film) =

1980 Indian Tamil-language action thriller film by R. Krishnamoorthy

- Theatrical release poster
- Directed by: R. Krishnamoorthy
- Written by: A. L. Narayanan (dialogues)
- Based on: Don by Salim–Javed
- Produced by: Suresh Balaje
- Starring: Rajinikanth; Sripriya; Balaji
- Cinematography: G. Or. Nathan
- Edited by: V. Chakrapani
- Music by: M. S. Viswanathan
- Production company: Suresh Arts
- Release date: 26 January 1980
- Running time: 175 minutes
- Country: India
- Language: Tamil

Billa is a 1980 Indian Tamil-language action thriller film directed by R. Krishnamoorthy and produced by Suresh Balaje. The film stars Rajinikanth in a dual role, alongside Sripriya and Balaji. It is a remake of Don, a 1978 Hindi film written by Salim–Javed and starring Amitabh Bachchan. The film revolves around Billa, a powerful ganglord who is fatally wounded during an encounter with the police. Wanting to uncover Billa's accomplices, DSP Alexander trains a lookalike simpleton Rajappa to pose as Billa and infiltrate the gang.

Billa was released on 26 January 1980, and emerged a blockbuster, running for over 25 weeks in theatres. It was a turning point in Rajinikanth's career, disproving detractors that claimed he was "finished" and which saw him accepted as a full-fledged hero. He was subsequently cast in a series of roles modelled after Bachchan's angry young man persona, in various Tamil remakes of Hindi films written by Salim–Javed and starring Bachchan, who Rajinikanth has credited as his inspiration. The success of Billa established Rajinikanth as one of the top stars of Tamil cinema. It was remade in 2007 in Tamil under the same title.

== Plot ==
Billa is a powerful ganglord, who, despite being one of the most wanted on the list of Interpol, remains elusive to the police. Along with the police, he makes a few other enemies through his merciless approach in running his organisation, especially when he kills one of his own men, Rajesh, when Rajesh decides to leave the business. This introduces Billa to two new enemies: Reena (Rajesh's fiancée) and Rajesh's sister Radha. When Reena seduces Billa and attempts to have the police arrest him, her plan backfires, as Billa outsmarts her and escapes, and in the process, Reena is killed.

Radha, seeking revenge, infiltrates Billa's gang. After several unsuccessful attempts at nabbing Billa, the police finally succeed, but Billa dies during the pursuit, botching DSP Alexander's plan to reach the source of all crime—the man Billa reported to—by capturing Billa alive. Alexander buries Billa's body, ensuring that people believe that he is still alive. Alexander remembers his chance encounter with Rajappa, a simpleton trying to support two small foster children, who is a doppelgänger of Billa. Alexander hatches a plan to transform Rajappa into Billa and place him back into the criminal nexus, but this time as a police informer.

Around the time Rajappa infiltrates Billa's gang as Billa under the guise of amnesia, former circus man JJ, just released from prison, begins his mission of revenge against Alexander (for his wife's death) and his search for his children who had been saved and taken care off by Rajappa. Rajappa manages to replace the red diary with a blank one, and tells his gang that he is going to take revenge on Alexander, but is actually going there to give him the red diary. Radha attacks Rajappa, who tries to explain to her that he is not Billa. She refuses to believe him until Alexander intervenes and confirms Rajappa identity.

Meanwhile, as Rajappa learns more and more about Billa through the discovery of his diary and Radha's help, he announces to his colleagues that his memory is back. Celebrations ensue, as "Billa" announces his return to the underworld, but things take a drastic turn when the police raid the celebrations, acting upon Rajappa's information. Rajappa's only witness to his true identity, Alexander, dies in the crossfire and Rajappa is arrested.

Tangled in a web of confusion when the police refused to believe that he is Rajappa, whereas his underworld gang realise that he is indeed not Billa, Rajappa becomes not only hated by the police, but also by Billa's right-hand and the rest of his gang. To add to Rajappa's woes, Billa's diary, which he had handed over to Alexander – his last hope of proving his innocence – is stolen by JJ in an attempt to track down his lost children, without realising that only Rajappa can reunite them. Rajappa escapes from the police and the underworld with Radha's help, but struggles to prove his identity and innocence.

Rajappa eventually discovers that the interpol officer Gokulnath is Jagdish, the real underworld crime boss who had killed Alexander, and after a long fight against Jagdish's men, Radha ends up getting the diary and one of the gangster's snatches it and burns it. It is later revealed that the diary which was burnt was, in fact, the fake diary and Rajappa had the real one to trick Jagdish. He gives the evidence to the police and is cleared of all charges against him. Jagdish is arrested, and Rajappa returns to his old life.

== Cast ==
- Rajinikanth in a dual role as:
  - Billa
  - Rajappa
- Sripriya as Radha
- Balaji as DSP Alexander
- Major Sundarrajan as Jagadish / Gokulnath (fake)
- Manohar as Ranjith
- Thengai Srinivasan as J.Jaganath (JJ)
- A. V. M. Rajan as Inspector Varma
- S. A. Ashokan as Amarnath, Radha's gym trainer
- Praveena as Rupa
- Manorama as Pattu, Rajappa's friend
- Helen as Reena

== Production ==
By the end of the 1970s, Rajinikanth had become a popular actor in the Tamil film industry. During this phase of his career, he abruptly chose to quit acting, but was coaxed back. He made a comeback with the R. Krishnamoorthy-directed Billa, which was a remake of the Hindi film Don (1978) written by Salim–Javed. The film was named after Billa, a real criminal. For the first time in his career, Rajinikanth was cast in dual roles: the eponymous gangster and the street entertainer Rajappa. Although the film was a shot-for-shot adaptation of Don, Rajinikanth avoided aping Amitabh Bachchan, the lead actor of the original, and instead interpreted the roles in his own unique style. Balaji, in addition to playing the DSP Alexander, was credited as the film's presenter. J. Jayalalithaa was initially offered the female lead role of Radha, but declined; the role went to Sripriya. Helen, who appeared in Don, reprised her role in Billa. The dialogues were written by A. L. Narayanan, cinematography was handled by G. Or. Nathan, and the editing by V. Chakrapani. The film was produced by Balaji's son Suresh Balaje under Suresh Arts.

== Soundtrack ==
The film's original soundtrack was composed by M. S. Viswanathan, while the lyrics were written by Kannadasan. The song "Vethalayai Potendi" replaces "Khaike Paan Banaras Wala" from the 1978 Hindi original. That, and "My Name is Billa" attained popularity.

Track listing
No.	Title	Singer(s)	Length
1.	"My Name Is Billa"	S. P. Balasubrahmanyam	04:26
2.	"Iravum Pagalum"	Malaysia Vasudevan, Vani Jairam	04:39
3.	"Veththalaya Pottendi"	Malaysia Vasudevan	04:48
4.	"Nattukulla Enakkoru"	S. P. Balasubrahmanyam, L. R. Anjali	04:38
5.	"Ninaithale Inikkum Sugame"	L. R. Eswari	04:23
Total length:			22:14

== Release and reception ==
Billa was released on 26 January 1980, India's Republic Day. Ananda Vikatan rated the film 46 out of 100, criticising the screenplay but calling it an enjoyable entertainer. It ran for over 25 weeks in theatres, and became Rajinikanth's biggest commercial success to that point.

== Legacy ==
Billa was a turning point in his career, disproving detractors that claimed he was "finished" and which saw him accepted as a full-fledged hero. He was subsequently cast in a series of roles modelled after Amitabh Bachchan's "angry young man" persona, in various Tamil remakes of Hindi films written by Salim–Javed and starring Bachchan, who Rajinikanth has credited as his inspiration. The success of Billa established Rajinikanth as one of the top stars of Tamil cinema. However, historian G. Dhananjayan lamented that it also started the trend in Tamil cinema where the protagonist enjoys being a gangster and the audience is not shown the character's backstory, in contrast to earlier films where the protagonist takes to crime due to societal issues. Billa's dialogue "En kodi parakavendiya yedathula vera yevan kodi da parakum" (In the place where my flag is meant to fly, who else's flag do you think will fly?) attained popularity. Krishnamoorthy became popularly known as "Billa" Krishnamoorthy after this film's release. Venkateswaran Narayanan, the deputy editor at The Times of India, said, "I would think [Rajinikanth's] road to superstardom began with the steps he took in Billa. You can make a clear distinction between the roles he did before and after Billa."

== Billa series ==
Billa was remade again in 2007 under the same title by Vishnuvardhan, with Ajith Kumar portraying Billa. This remake featured remixes of the songs "Vethalayai Potendi" and "My Name is Billa". After its commercial success, Vishnuvardhan decided to launch a prequel – Billa II with Ajith Kumar reprising his role. But due to date issues, Vishnuvardhan left the project, leaving it to Chakri Toleti. The film was released on 13 July 2012.

== Bibliography ==
- Ramachandran, Naman (2014) [2012]. Rajinikanth: The Definitive Biography. New Delhi: Penguin Books. ISBN 978-0-14-342111-5.
