= Vaa Kanna Vaa =

- Poster
- Directed by: D. Yoganand
- Written by: Vietnam Veedu Sundaram (dialogues)
- Story by: Gopi
- Produced by: Santhi Narayanasamy
- Starring: Sivaji Ganesan; Sujatha; Major Sundarrajan; Jai Ganesh
- Cinematography: G. R. Nathan
- Edited by: B. Kandhasamy
- Music by: M. S. Viswanathan
- Production company: Sivaji Productions
- Release date: 6 February 1982
- Country: India
- Language: Tamil

Vaa Kanna Vaa (transl. Come dear, come) is a 1982 Indian Tamil-language film, directed by D. Yoganand and produced by Santhi Narayanasamy. The film stars Sivaji Ganesan, Sujatha, Major Sundarrajan and Jai Ganesh. It is a remake of the Telugu film Raa Kanna Raa. The film was released on 6 February 1982.

== Plot ==
Young lovers Ramu and Seetha fight all the time while old couple Naidu and Papa are devoted to one another. The young couple eventually rent a room at Naidu and Papa's house after Ramu defies his wealthy father to wed Seetha. The older couple starts to think of Seetha as their adopted daughter and is consequently drawn into the lives of the younger couple.

However, once Seetha has a child, problems erupt between Seetha and Ramu. Naidu and Papa support Seetha unconditionally becoming very attached to her child. Subsequently, Ramu rejoins with his father who relents wanting to see his grandson. He comes to accept Seetha as his daughter-in-law thereby taking away the child with her. This leaves Naidu losing his sanity and Papa heartbroken. They both die with Naidu committing suicide while Papa dies in shock at Naidu's death.

== Cast ==
- Sivaji Ganesan as Naidu
- Sujatha as Papa
- Major Sundarrajan
- Jai Ganesh as Ramu
- Nagesh as Ezhumalai
- Y. G. Mahendra as Krishnamoorthy
- V. K. Ramasamy as Karnan
- Vadivukkarasi as Seetha

== Soundtrack ==
The music was composed by M. S. Viswanathan with lyrics by Vaali.

Song	Singers	Length
"Kannirandil Maiyezhudhi Kannathile"	T. M. Soundararajan, P. Susheela	4:23
"Pushpangal Paal Pazhangal"	T. M. Soundararajan, P. Susheela	4:25
"Oru Kaalathile Ennai"	T. M. Soundararajan	4:44
"Kanna Mani Vanna"	T. M. Soundararajan, P. Susheela, B. S. Sasirekha	5:54
"Kannirandil Maiyezhudhi Kannathile" (Sad)	P. Susheela	1:33

== Reception ==
Kalki said the film was not to be analysed, but enjoyed.
