= Justice Chowdary =

- Theatrical release poster
- Directed by: K. Raghavendra Rao
- Screenplay by: K. Raghavendra Rao
- Story by: Satyanand
- Produced by: T. Trivikrama Rao
- Starring: N. T. Rama Rao; Sridevi
- Cinematography: K. S. Prakash
- Edited by: Kotagiri Venkateswara Rao
- Music by: Chakravarthy
- Production company: Vijayalakshmi Art Pictures
- Release date: 28 May 1982
- Running time: 155 minutes
- Country: India
- Language: Telugu

Justice Chowdary is a 1982 Indian Telugu-language action drama film, produced by T. Trivikrama Rao and directed by K. Raghavendra Rao. It stars N. T. Rama Rao and Sridevi, with music composed by Chakravarthy. The film was remade in Bollywood as Justice Chaudhury, in Kollywood as Neethibathi, in Sandalwood as Agni Parikshe and in Mollywood as Justice Raja. The film became a box office hit and the second highest grossing Telugu film of the year 1982 after Rama Rao's own Bobbili Puli.

== Cast ==
- Sr. N.T.R. as Justice R. K. Chowdary and Ramu (Dual Role)
- Sridevi as Rekha
- Sharada as Radha
- Jayanthi as Janaki
- Rao Gopal Rao as Lawyer Kailasam
- Satyanarayana as Papa Rao and Ranga Rao (Dual Role)
- Allu Ramalingaiah as Tata Rao
- Nagesh as Anthony
- Prabhakar Reddy as Dr. Murthy
- Mukkamala as Chowdary's father-in-law
- Chalapathi Rao as Chalapathi
- P. J. Sarma as Commissioner
- Sridhar as Inspector Raja
- Raja as Gopal
- Telephone Satyanarayana as Judge
- Hema Sundar as Jaganatham
- Rajya Lakshmi as Latha
- Mucherla Aruna as Lakshmi
- Subhashini as Tata Rao's daughter

== Soundtrack ==
Justice Chowdary

Film score by Chakravarthy
- Released: 1982
- Genre: Soundtrack
- Length: 30:11
- Label: AVM Audio
- Producer: Chakravarthy

Chakravarthy chronology
Anuraga Devata (1982)	Justice Chowdary (1982)	Naa Desam (1982)

Music composed by Chakravarthy. Lyrics were written by Veturi. Music released on AVM Audio Company.

S. No.	Song title	Singers	length
1	"Muddu Mida Muddu"	S. P. Balasubrahmanyam, P. Susheela	4:28
2	"Okatato Number"	S. P. Balasubrahmanyam, P. Susheela	4:38
3	"Abba Musuresindi"	S. P. Balasubrahmanyam, P. Susheela	4:33
4	"Nee Chekkili Vela"	S. P. Balasubrahmanyam, P. Susheela	4:03
5	"Nee Toli Choopulone"	S. P. Balasubrahmanyam, P. Susheela	4:36
6	"Sri Lakshmi Pelliki"	S. P. Balasubrahmanyam, P. Susheela, S. P. Sailaja	4:18
7	"Chattaniki Nyayaniki"	S. P. Balasubrahmanyam	3:35

== Reception ==
Venkat Rao of Andhra Patrika in his review dated 31 May 1982, wrote that the film is a testimony to Rama Rao's acting prowess. On 13 June 1982, Palakodeti of Sitara also echoed the same, praising Rama Rao's performance.

== Legacy ==
N. T. Rama Rao's grandson Jr. N.T.R. had briefly mimicked his grandfather's voice, played and parodied Justice Chowdary's character in the 2013 film Baadshah for a comedy scene with Brahmanandam.
