= Garuda Saukiyama =

- Theatrical release poster
- Directed by: K. S. Prakash Rao
- Written by: Vietnam Veedu Sundaram
- Produced by: T. S. Sethuraman
- Starring: Sivaji Ganesan; Sujatha; Mohan; Thiagarajan
- Cinematography: N. K. Viswanathan
- Edited by: K. R. Krishnan
- Music by: M. S. Viswanathan
- Production company: Revathi Combines
- Release date: 25 February 1982
- Country: India
- Language: Tamil

Garuda Saukiyama (transl. Are you fine, Garuda?) is a 1982 Indian Tamil-language crime film, directed by K. S. Prakash Rao and written by Vietnam Veedu Sundaram. The film stars Sivaji Ganesan, Sujatha, Mohan and Thiagarajan. It revolves around a petty criminal who eventually rises to become a feared don. The film was released on 25 February 1982, and became a box-office bomb.

== Plot ==
Mary reared Deenadayalan as an orphan. He begins with little offences and progresses to more serious offences as he grows older. He eventually becomes a don and presents himself to the public as a philanthropic businessman.

Muthukrishnan is taken under Deenadayalan's wing. Despite this, he has a strong sense of justice and is regarded as a protector of the poor and oppressed. His wife Lakshmi and daughter Radha have no idea about his unlawful operations. However, as he experiences treachery from people close to him, his work begins to have an influence on his family.

== Cast ==
- Sivaji Ganesan as Deenadayalan
- Sujatha as Lakshmi
- Thiagarajan as Muthukrishnan
- Pandari Bai as Mary
- Ambika as Radha
- Mohan as Mohan
- Rajyalakshmi as Meena
- Sangili Murugan as Sathyanathan

== Soundtrack ==
The soundtrack was composed by M. S. Viswanathan.

Track listing
| No. | Title | Lyrics | Singer(s) | Length |
|---|---|---|---|---|
| 1. | "Sandana Malarin Sundara Vadivil" | Alangudi Somu | S. P. Balasubrahmanyam | 4:15 |
| 2. | "Mottu Vitta Vasanai" | Vairamuthu | P. Jayachandran, S. Janaki | 4:35 |
| 3. | "Muthu Rathina Chithiram" | Alangudi Somu | S. Janaki | 4:30 |
| 4. | "Geethai Solla Kannan" | Alangudi Somu | T. M. Soundararajan | 4:11 |
| Total length: | | | | 17:31 |

== Release and reception ==
Garuda Saukiyama was released on 25 February 1982. Thiraignani of Kalki negatively reviewed the film, criticising its similarities to The Godfather (1972). The film became a box-office bomb.
