= Sujatha (actress) =

Indian actress

- Born: 10 December 1952; Galle, Dominion of Ceylon (present-day Sri Lanka)
- Died: 6 April 2011 (aged 58); Chennai, Tamil Nadu, India
- Occupation: Actress
- Years active: 1968–2007
- Spouse: Jayakar (m. 1977)
- Children: 2

Sujatha (10 December 1952 – 6 April 2011) was an Indian actress who worked in Tamil, Malayalam and Telugu films in addition to few in Kannada and Hindi languages as well. The actress was best known for restraint and subtlety in portrayal of varied emotions. After starring in numerous Malayalam films in her mother-tongue, Sujatha later got introduced to the Tamil film industry by veteran director K. Balachander and as a protagonist in her first Tamil film, Aval Oru Thodar Kathai (1974).

== Early life ==
Sujatha was born in a Malayalam-speaking family on 10 December 1952 in Galle, Sri Lanka. She spent most of her early days of childhood over there. She participated in school plays, and later moved to Tamil Nadu when she was about 15.

== Career ==
Growing up in Sri Lanka and later shifting to Kerala, she did a Malayalam film Ernakulam Junction (1971) and that paved the way for future success.

She shot to fame with K. Balachander’s 1974 directorial Aval Oru Thodar Kathai. The film was a raging hit and narrated the story of women sacrificing their happiness for their families. She acted opposite the late Sivaji Ganesan, and in the mid 1970s played heroine to both Rajinikanth and Kamal Haasan, who were just starting their career at that time.

Sujatha also won Filmfare Awards South for films like Uravu Solla Oruvan (1975), Annakili (1976), Avargal (1977) and Guppedu Manasu (1979). She garnered critical acclaim for doing maximum heroine-centric films. She went on to win Tamil Nadu State Film Awards for films like Thunaivi (1982) and Paritchaikku Neramaachu (1982).

In Gorintaku (1979), she paired with Sobhan Babu and sacrifices her love in a love story that gets a twist. Thus began an affair with Telugu audiences who got to see her in many more appropriate roles. Sujatha acted in some impressive films like Yedanthasthula Meda (1980) Circus Ramudu (1980), Prema Tarangalu (1980), Sitadevi (1982) M. L. A. Yedukondalu (1983), Anubandham (1984), Agni Gundam (1984), Justice Chakravarthy (1984), Sutradharulu (1984), Chanti (1992), Surigadu (1992), Pelli (1997), Sneham Kosam (1999) and Neeku Nenu Naaku Nuvvu (2003).

During the 1980s, she started playing character roles, often portraying mothers. She played the mother of Rajinikanth in the films Maaveeran (1986) Kodi Parakuthu (1989), Uzhaippali (1993) and Baba (2002). She played mother roles in Ajith Kumar films Aval Varuvala (1998), Villain (2002), Attahasam (2004) and Varalaru (2006).

== Death ==
While undergoing treatment for a heart ailment, Sujatha died of cardiac arrest in Chennai on 6 April 2011.

== Awards and honours ==
Filmfare Awards South

- 1975 – Filmfare Award for Best Actress – Tamil for Uravu Solla Oruvan
- 1976 – Filmfare Award for Best Actress – Tamil for Annakili
- 1977 – Filmfare Award for Best Actress – Tamil for Avargal
- 1979 – Filmfare Award for Best Actress – Telugu for Guppedu Manasu

Nandi Awards

- 1997– Nandi Award for Best Character Actress for Pelli

Tamil Nadu State Film Awards

- 1982 – Special Best Actress for Thunaivi
- 1982 – Special Best Actress for Paritchaikku Neramaachu

Government of Tamil Nadu

- Kalaimamani

== Notable filmography ==
=== Malayalam ===
| Year | Film | Role | Notes |
|---|---|---|---|
| 1965 | Ammu | Sharadha | Debut film |
| 1965 | Kattupookkal | | |
| 1965 | Kadathukaran | Kadambari | |
| 1966 | Rowdy | | |
| 1970 | Olavum Theeravum | | |
| 1971 | Avalalpam Vaikippoyi | | |
| 1971 | Thapaswini | | |
| 1971 | Ernakulam Junction | Jaya | |
| 1972 | Devi | | |
| 1972 | Manushya Bandhangal | Mini | |
| 1972 | Snehadeepame Mizhithurakku | Gouri | |
| 1972 | Mayiladumkunnu | Leela | |
| 1972 | Punarjanmam | Janu | |
| 1972 | Anweshanam | Vasanthi | |
| 1972 | Ananthashayanam | Geetha | |
| 1972 | Azhimukham | | |
| 1972 | Aaradimanninte Janmi | Nirmala | |
| 1972 | Akkarapacha | Devaki | |
| 1972 | Aadhyathe Katha | Nalini | |
| 1972 | Brahmachari | Suvarna | |
| 1972 | Maaya | Omana | |
| 1973 | Driksaakshi | Sumathi | |
| 1973 | Thekkan Kattu | Annakkutty | |
| 1973 | Ajnathavasam | Geetha | |
| 1973 | Ladies Hostel | Reema | |
| 1973 | Bhadradeepam | Usha | |
| 1973 | Chukku | Clara | |
| 1973 | Football Champion | Thulasi | |
| 1973 | Manassu | | |
| 1973 | Kaattuvithachavan | | |
| 1973 | Chuzhi | Neena | |
| 1973 | Achani | Uma | |
| 1973 | Interview | Sreedevi | |
| 1973 | Kaliyugam | Jaanu | |
| 1973 | Raakkuyil | Usha | |
| 1973 | Swarga Puthri | Jolly | |
| 1974 | Sapthaswarangal | Rukmini | |
| 1974 | Shapamoksham | | |
| 1974 | Chakravakam | Devaki | |
| 1974 | Chattakari | Usha | |
| 1975 | Malsaram | | |
| 1975 | Sammanam | Geetha | |
| 1975 | Chuvanna Sandhyakal | Susheela | |
| 1975 | Thiruvonam | Sujatha | |
| 1975 | Chumaduthaangi | Mini | |
| 1975 | Niramaala | | |
| 1976 | Aayiram Janmangal | | |
| 1976 | Udayam Kizhakku Thanne | | |
| 1978 | Bhrashtu | | |
| 1980 | Pappu | Herself | |
| 1982 | Oru Vilippadakale | Ammu | |
| 1982 | Preeyasakhi Radha | | |
| 1983 | Justice Raja | Radha | |
| 1986 | Ariyaatha Bandham | | |
| 1992 | Simhadhwani | | |
| 2001 | Chitrathoonukal | | |
| 2004 | Jalothsavam | Bhanumathi | |
| 2005 | Chandrolsavam | Bhavani | |
| 2005 | Mayookham | Devaki | |

=== Tamil ===
| Year | Film | Role | Notes |
|---|---|---|---|
| 1974 | Aval Oru Thodar Kathai | Kavitha | |
| 1975 | Uravukku Kai Koduppom | | |
| 1975 | Thennangkeetru | Vasumathi | |
| 1975 | Aan Pillai Singam | Rajam's servant | |
| 1975 | Uravu Solla Oruvan | Sumathi | |
| 1975 | Vaazhnthu Kaattugiren | Geetha | |
| 1975 | Aayirathil Oruthi | Srikanth's lover | |
| 1975 | Mayangukiral Oru Maadhu | Kalpana | |
| 1976 | Perum Pugazhum | | |
| 1976 | Janaki Sabatham | | |
| 1976 | Oru Oodhappu Kan Simittugiradhu | Radha | |
| 1976 | Idhaya Malar | Radha | |
| 1976 | Muthana Muthallava | | |
| 1976 | Nee Oru Maharani | | |
| 1976 | Oru Kodiyil Iru Malargal | | |
| 1976 | Ungalil Oruthi | Madhavi | |
| 1976 | Lalitha | Lalitha | |
| 1976 | Annakili | Annam | |
| 1977 | Uyarndhavargal | Aarthi | |
| 1977 | Andaman Kadhali | Maragatham | |
| 1977 | Dheepam | Radha | |
| 1977 | Avargal | Anu | |
| 1977 | Sonnathai Seiven | | |
| 1977 | Balaparitchai | | |
| 1977 | Enna Thavam Saithen | | |
| 1977 | Pala Parikshai | | |
| 1977 | Thunai Iruppal Meenakshi | | |
| 1977 | Aasai Manaivi | | |
| 1977 | Nandha En Nila | | |
| 1977 | Annan Oru Koyil | Janaki | |
| 1978 | Mariamman Thiruvizha | | |
| 1978 | Kaipidithaval | | |
| 1978 | Shri Kanchi Kamakshi | Sundari | |
| 1978 | Iraivan Kodutha Varam | | |
| 1979 | Kandhar Alangaram | | |
| 1979 | Raja Rajeshwari | | |
| 1979 | Gnana Kuzhandhai | Thilagavathi | |
| 1979 | Sri Rama Jayam | | |
| 1979 | Poonthalir | Maya | |
| 1979 | Nool Veli | Vidya | |
| 1979 | Adukku Malli | | |
| 1980 | Neer Nilam Neruppu | | |
| 1980 | Anbukku Naan Adimai | Lakshmi | |
| 1980 | Maadi Veettu Ezhai | Lakshmi | |
| 1980 | Vishwaroopam | Savithri | |
| 1981 | Kadal Meengal | Kamal's wife | |
| 1982 | Vaa Kanna Vaa | Papa | |
| 1982 | Paritchaikku Neramaachu | Vedha | |
| 1982 | Theerpu | Radha | |
| 1982 | Idho Varukiren | | |
| 1982 | Thaai Mookaambikai | Annapoorani "Poorani" | |
| 1982 | Garuda Saukiyama | Lakshmi | |
| 1982 | Thunaivi | | |
| 1982 | Nayakkirin Magal | | |
| 1982 | Thyagi | Kamala | |
| 1983 | Neethibathi | Janaki | |
| 1983 | Thudikkum Karangal | Balu's wife | |
| 1983 | Sandhippu | Lakshmi | |
| 1983 | Kodugal Illatha Kolam | | |
| 1983 | Sumangali | Thulasi Vedarathnam | |
| 1984 | Thiruppam | | |
| 1984 | Vidhi | Shakunthala | |
| 1984 | Vellai Pura Ondru | | |
| 1984 | Veetuku Oru Kannagi | Suja | |
| 1984 | Alaya Deepam | | |
| 1984 | Unnai Naan Santhithen | Janaki | |
| 1984 | Kudumbam | Vijaya | |
| 1985 | Uthami | Gayathri | |
| 1985 | Sivappu Nila | | |
| 1985 | Nermai | Parvathi | |
| 1985 | Karpoora Deepam | | |
| 1985 | Naam | | |
| 1985 | Mangamma Sapatham | Mangamma | |
| 1985 | Perumai | | |
| 1986 | Meendum Pallavi | | |
| 1986 | Uyire Unakkaga | Abhirami | |
| 1986 | Mahashakthi Mariamma | Mariamma Devotee | |
| 1986 | Revathi | | |
| 1986 | Thaaiku Oru Thaalaattu | Padmavathi | |
| 1986 | Kanne Kaniyamuthe | | |
| 1986 | Maaveeran | Raja's mother | |
| 1986 | Vidinja Kalyanam | Janaki | |
| 1986 | Kannukku Mai Ezhuthu | | |
| 1986 | Mannukkul Vairam | | |
| 1987 | Chellakutti | | |
| 1987 | Mupperum Deviyar | Saraswati | |
| 1989 | Pen Puthi Mun Puthi | | |
| 1989 | Dharmam Vellum | Saradha | |
| 1989 | Kodi Parakuthu | Rajini's mother | |
| 1990 | Nalla Kaalam Porandaachu | | |
| 1992 | Senthamizh Paattu | Kalaivani | |
| 1992 | Abhirami | Abhirami | |
| 1993 | Koyil Kaalai | Maragadhammal | |
| 1993 | Uzhaippali | Janaki | |
| 1993 | Uzhavan | Subbammal | |
| 1994 | Amaithipadai | Sivakami | |
| 1994 | Rajakumaran | Rajakumaran's mother | |
| 1994 | Watchman Vadivel | Sarassu | |
| 1994 | Kanmanai | Rajalakshmi | |
| 1994 | Thozhar Pandian | | |
| 1994 | Senthamizh Selvan | Janaki | |
| 1995 | Karnaa | Lakshmi | |
| 1996 | Poovarasan | Ukrapandi's wife | |
| 1996 | Sivasakthi | Siva's mother | |
| 1998 | Aval Varuvala | Janaki | |
| 1998 | Natpukaaga | Lakshmi | |
| 1999 | Ninaivirukkum Varai | Janakiraman's mother | |
| 1999 | Azhagarsamy | Thayama | |
| 1999 | Paattali | Lakshmi | |
| 2000 | Sandhitha Velai | Aadalarasu's mother | |
| 2002 | Nettru Varai Nee Yaaro | Meenakshi | |
| 2002 | Baba | Baba's mother | |
| 2002 | Villain | Lalitha Subramaniam | |
| 2004 | Arul | Sornam | |
| 2004 | Maanasthan | Pattamaniyar's wife | |
| 2004 | Attahasam | Guru and Jeeva's mother | |
| 2006 | Vathiyar | Durai's mother | |
| 2006 | Varalaru | Shiva Shankar's Mother-in-law | |

=== Telugu ===
| Year | Film | Role | Notes |
|---|---|---|---|
| 1979 | Guppedu Manasu | Vidya | Tollywood debut and bilingual film |
| 1979 | Gorintaku | Swapna | |
| 1980 | Yedanthasthula Meda | Janaki | |
| 1980 | Sandhya | Sandhya | |
| 1980 | Pasupu Parani | | |
| 1980 | Bebbuli | Lalitha | |
| 1980 | Circus Ramudu | Ankamma | |
| 1980 | Sirimalle Navvindi | | |
| 1980 | Prema Tarangalu | Sujatha | |
| 1980 | Sujatha | Sujatha | |
| 1981 | Ragile Jwala | Lakshmi | |
| 1981 | Guru Sishyulu | Shanti | |
| 1981 | Pranaya Geetham | | |
| 1981 | Maha Purushudu | Lakshmi | |
| 1981 | Pandanti Jeevitham | | |
| 1982 | Vamsa Gowravam | Lakshmi | |
| 1982 | Bangaru Kanuka | Shanti | |
| 1982 | Sitadevi | | |
| 1982 | Yuvaraju | Dr. Karuna | |
| 1983 | Bahudoorapu Batasari | Prabha | |
| 1983 | M. L. A. Yedukondalu | | |
| 1983 | Abhilasha | | |
| 1984 | Justice Chakravarthy | | |
| 1984 | Anubandham | Sujatha | |
| 1984 | Bhola Shankarudu | | |
| 1984 | Agni Gundam | | |
| 1985 | Intiko Rudramma | Durga | |
| 1989 | Srirama Chandrudu | | |
| 1989 | Rajakeeya Chadarangam | Savitri | |
| 1990 | Sutradhaarulu | Devamma | |
| 1992 | Chanti | Kanthamma | |
| 1992 | Madhavayya Gari Manavadu | Madhavi | |
| 1992 | Surigadu | | |
| 1992 | Ahankari | Jayanthi | |
| 1993 | Aadarsam | Savitri | |
| 1993 | Kondapalli Raja | Raja's mother | |
| 1993 | Nippu Ravva | Mahalakshmi | |
| 1994 | Maa Voori Maaraju | | |
| 1994 | M. Dharmaraju M.A. | | |
| 1994 | Nannagaru | | |
| 1995 | Vajram | | |
| 1995 | Big Boss | | |
| 1995 | Simha Garjana | | |
| 1995 | Vetagadu | | |
| 1996 | Pelli | | |
| 1998 | Subbaraju Gari Kutumbam | | |
| 1998 | Auto Driver | Jagan's mother | |
| 1999 | Sneham Kosam | Lakshmi | |
| 2001 | Vyjayanthi | | |
| 2001 | Repallelo Radha | | |
| 2001 | Prematho Raa | Chandu's grandmother | |
| 2001 | Evadra Rowdy | Janaki | |
| 2002 | Seema Simham | Lakshmi | |
| 2002 | Tappu Chesi Pappu Koodu | Zamindar Bhupati's wife | |
| 2002 | Nee Sneham | Amrutha's grandmother | |
| 2003 | Neeku Nenu Naaku Nuvvu | Raghavayya's wife | |
| 2003 | Villain | Siva's and Vishnu's mother | |
| 2006 | Sri Ramadasu | Pokala Damakka | |
| 2007 | Chandrahas | | |

=== Hindi ===
| Year | Film | Role | Notes |
|---|---|---|---|
| 1981 | Ek Hi Bhool | | Bollywood debut |

=== Kannada ===
| Year | Film | Role | Notes |
|---|---|---|---|
| 1982 | Nanna Devaru | Radha | |
| 1983 | Aakrosha | | |
| 1984 | Kanoonige Saval | Sudha | |
| 1984 | Prema Sakshi | | |
| 1988 | Super Boy 3D | | |
| 1989 | Bidisada Bandha | Kamala Devi | |
| 1998 | Thutta Mutta | Anusuya | |
| 2003 | Kiccha | Sharada (Kiccha's mother) | |
| 2006 | Neelakanta | | |

=== Voice artist ===
- For Jaya Prada - Ninaithale Inikkum
