= Nerupukkul Eeram =

- Theatrical release poster
- Directed by: R. Krishnamoorthy
- Produced by: G. Thiagarajan; V.Thamilazhagan
- Starring: Thiagarajan; Ambika
- Music by: Ilaiyaraaja
- Production company: Sathya Movies
- Release date: 20 July 1984
- Country: India
- Language: Tamil

Nerupukkul Eeram (transl. Moist in fire) is a 1984 Indian Tamil-language film directed by R. Krishnamoorthy. It stars Thiagarajan and Ambika. The film was released on 20 July 1984.

== Cast ==
- Thiagarajan
- Ambika
- Rajeev
- Urvashi
- Nizhalgal Ravi
- Senthamarai

== Soundtrack ==
Soundtrack was composed by Ilaiyaraaja.

Song	Singers	Lyrics
"Ammamma"	Malaysia Vasudevan, S. Janaki	Pulamaipithan
"Kannil Ondru"	Malaysia Vasudevan, S. Janaki	Na. Kamarasan
"Maamane Maamane"	S. P. Sailaja, Saibaba	Vaali
"Thaniya"	S. Janaki, Malaysia Vasudevan	Muthulingam

== Reception ==
Balumani of Anna praised the acting of star cast, Ilaiyaraaja's music while also praising Krishnamoorthy for directing the film without slack and concluded calling it an heartfelt film made in such a way which impresses women and all types of audience. Jayamanmadhan of Kalki wrote what else could maker could so with such a tired plot and also felt the film moved like Red smoke locomotive freight train but praised the acting of Senthamarai and child artist.
