= Theerpu =

- Poster
- Directed by: R. Krishnamoorthy
- Written by: A. L. Narayanan (dialogues)
- Produced by: Anandavalli Balaji
- Starring: Sivaji Ganesan; Jaishankar; Sujatha; Vijayakumar
- Cinematography: K. S. Prasad
- Edited by: V. Chakrapani
- Music by: M. S. Viswanathan
- Production company: Sujatha Cine Arts
- Release date: 21 April 1982
- Country: India
- Language: Tamil

Theerpu (transl. Judgement) is a 1982 Indian Tamil-language film directed by R. Krishnamoorthy. The film stars Jaishankar, Sujatha, K. Balaji and Sivaji Ganesan. It is a remake of the Malayalam film Ithihasam. The film was released on 21 April 1982, and had a theatrical run of over 100 days.

== Plot ==
Rajasekar, the Superintendent of Police, lives happily with his wife, two sons (one is a lawyer and the other an inspector), and a daughter. Things take a turn for the worse when his daughter is raped by a smuggler seeking revenge. Upon seeing his daughter in such a state, he immediately kills the smuggler. He is then arrested by his own son, who is an inspector, for committing murder. His other son, the lawyer, tries to prove his innocence. During the investigation, he does not reveal the real cause for fear of tarnishing his daughter's reputation. What happens next is the rest of the film.

== Cast ==
- Sivaji Ganesan as Rajasekar, Superintendent of Police
- Sujatha as Radha
- Jaishankar as Govindan
- K. Balaji
- Sarath Babu
- Vijayakumar
- Sumalatha as Kalpana
- Manorama
- R. N. Sudarshan as Alexander
- Silk Smitha as Kamini

== Soundtrack ==
Soundtrack was composed by M. S. Viswanathan and lyrics were by Vaali.

Track title	Singers
"Soppanathil Sindhu Padithena"	S. P. Balasubrahmanyam, Vani Jairam
"Theeye Unakenna"	M. S. Viswanathan
"Amma Oru Ambikaiye"	Vani Jairam, T. M. Soundararajan, P. Jayachandran
"Hey Mr. Ungalathan"	L. R. Eswari

== Reception ==
Thiraignani of Kalki praised the performances of the star cast.
