= Suresh Balaje =

Indian film producer

- Born: Chennai, Tamil Nadu, India
- Occupation: Film producer
- Years active: 1980–present
- Spouse: Usha Suresh
- Children: 2
- Parent(s): K. Balaji; Anandavally
- Relatives: Suchitra Mohanlal (sister); Mohanlal (brother-in-law); Pranav Mohanlal (nephew); Vismaya Mohanlal (niece)

Suresh Balaje is an Indian film producer, primarily working in Malayalam and Tamil films. He is the son of producer and actor K. Balaji. He has produced films such as Billa, Vazhvey Maayam, Gandharvam, Ulladakkam, 13 B, Yaavarum Nalam, Malamaal Weekly, Phir Milenge and Billa 2.

He is now working as an executive producer as well as a line producer under the banner Wide Angle Creations with his business partner George Pius. The french film Dheepan which won the Palme d'Or at 68th Cannes Film Festival is a collaboration of Wide Angle Creations and French director Jacques Audiard.

== Partial filmography ==
Year	Film	Language	Banner	Director
1978	Thyagam	Tamil	Sujatha Arts	K. Vijayan
1980	Billa	Tamil	Sujatha Arts	R. Krishnamurthy
1981	Thee	Tamil	Suresh Arts	R. Krishnamurthy
1982	Vazhvey Maayam	Tamil	Suresh Arts	R. Krishnamurthy
1985	Mangamma Sapatham	Tamil	Suresh Raj Films	K. Vijayan
1985	Viduthalai	Tamil	Suresh Raj Films	K. Vijayan
1987	Makkal En Pakkam	Tamil	Suresh Arts	Karthik Raghunath
1989	Dravidan	Tamil	Suresh Arts	R. Krishnamurthy
1991	Ulladakkam	Malayalam	Sithara Combines	Kamal
1993	Gandharvam	Malayalam	Sithara Combines	Sangeeth Sivan
1995	Nirnayam	Malayalam	Sithara Combines	Sangeeth Sivan
1999	Megham	Malayalam	Sithara Combines	Priyadarshan
2004	Phir Milenge	Hindi	Percept Picture Company; Line Producers; Wide Angle-(Suresh Balaje & George Pius)	Revathi
2006	Malamaal Weekly	Hindi	Sujatha Cine Arts	Priyadarshan
2007	Kireedam	Tamil	Sujatha Cine Arts	A. L. Vijay
2009	Yavarum Nalam	Tamil	Wide Angle (Suresh Balaje & George Pius)	Vikram Kumar
2009	13B	Hindi	Wide Angle (Suresh Balaje & George Pius)	Vikram Kumar
2012	Billa II	Tamil	(Sunir Kheterpal, Suresh Balaje, George Pius)	Chakri Toleti
2014	Malini 22 Palayamkottai	Tamil	Wide Angle (Suresh Balaje & George Pius)	Sripriya
2014	Son épouse	French	Patrick Sobelman (executive producer); Wide Angle (Suresh Balaje & George Pius)	Michel Spinosa
2015	Dheepan	French	Pascal Caucheteux; Wide Angle (Suresh Balaje & George Pius)	Jacques Audiard
2015	Papanasam	Tamil	Suresh Balaje, George Pius, Sripriya, Rajkumar Sethupathi	Jeethu Joseph
2015	Drishyam	Hindi	Viacom 18; Rajkumar Theatres Pvt Ltd; Wide Angle (Suresh Balaje & George Pius)	Nishikant Kamat
2015	Thoongaa Vanam	Tamil	Raajkamal films international Sri Gokulam Films; Wide Angle (Suresh Balaje & George Pius)	Rajesh M Selva
2017	Careful	Malayalam	Wide Angle Creations	V. K. Prakash
2021	Navarasa	Tamil	Wide Angle Creations	Mani Ratnam
2021	Marakkar: Lion of the Arabian Sea	Malayalam	Aashirvad Cinemas, Confident Group & Moonshot Entertainments	Priyadarshan
2023	Appatha	Tamil	Wide Angle Creations	Priyadarshan
2025	L2 Empuraan	Malayalam	Aashirvad Cinemas & Lyca Productions	Prithviraj Sukumaran
