= Nermai =

- Theatrical release poster
- Directed by: R. Krishnamoorthy
- Written by: A. L. Narayanan (dialogues)
- Story by: Moinuddin
- Produced by: K. R. Gangadharan
- Starring: Sivaji Ganesan; Sujatha; Prabhu; Radhika
- Cinematography: K. S. Prasad
- Edited by: V. Chakrapani
- Music by: M. S. Viswanathan
- Production company: K.R.G. Film Circuit
- Release date: 3 May 1985
- Country: India
- Language: Tamil

Nermai (/neɪrmaɪ/ transl. Honesty) is a 1985 Indian Tamil-language crime drama film, directed by R. Krishnamoorthy and produced by K. R. Gangadharan. The film stars Sivaji Ganesan, Sujatha, Prabhu and Radhika. It is a remake of the Hindi film Bulundi (1981).

== Plot ==
Gowrishankar is an economics professor at a college where his younger sister Radha and the spoiled Raja are students. Raja's father Jaikumar is a smuggler that wants his son to lead a virtuous life away from crime. Raja, however, happily uses his father's wealth as a shield to act out at college and has several run-ins with Radha. A desperate Jaikumar appeals to Gowrishankar to help put Raja on the right path and the professor agrees. Raja is ungrateful and conspires to have Gowrishankar fired but soon realises the errors of his ways. He becomes a model student and falls in love with Radha. Jaikumar is elated and attempts to move away from his own illegal activities. This worries his partners, Seetharam and Pappa Naidu. They seek to protect themselves and set up several plots to neutralise Gowrishankar. Raja and Gowrishankar work together to protect their loved ones and stop the evil men.

== Cast ==
- Sivaji Ganesan as Professor Gowrishankar
- Sujatha as Parvathi
- Prabhu as Raja
- Radhika as Radha
- Jaishankar as Jaikumar
- M. N. Nambiar as Seetharam
- Thengai Srinivasan as Pappa Naidu
- Y. G. Mahendran as Govindan
- Major Sundarrajan as Headmaster (Guest Appearance)
- Vijayakumar as Doctor (Guest Appearance)
- Manorama as Professor Kodi Malar
- Rajeev as Krishnakumar (Guest Appearance)
- Anuradha as Asha
- Typist Gopu

== Production ==
Some scenes were shot Vauhini Studios. Two songs and climax were shot at Ooty.

== Soundtrack ==
The music was composed by M. S. Viswanathan, with lyrics by Pulamaipithan.

Track listing
| No. | Title | Singer(s) | Length |
|---|---|---|---|
| 1. | "Vangadi Vangadi" | S. P. Balasubrahmanyam, Sirkazhi G. Sivachidambaram, S. Janaki, Manorama | 5:06 |
| 2. | "Thanga Thattu" | S. P. Balasubrahmanyam, S. Janaki | 4:02 |
| 3. | "Thamizh Paadattum" | S. P. Balasubrahmanyam, S. Janaki | 3:55 |
| 4. | "Ethanai Iniya" | S. P. Balasubrahmanyam, Malaysia Vasudevan, P. Susheela | 4:43 |
| Total length: | | | 17:46 |
