= Tharaasu =

- Poster
- Directed by: Rajaganapathy
- Written by: Rajaganapathy
- Produced by: G. Kanagasubbu
- Starring: Sivaji Ganesan; K. R. Vijaya; Poornam Viswanathan; Prabhu
- Cinematography: M. Kannappa
- Edited by: B. Kanthasamy
- Music by: M. S. Viswanathan
- Production company: Raja Ganapathy Films
- Release date: 16 March 1984
- Country: India
- Language: Tamil

Tharaasu (transl. Weighing balance) is a 1984 Indian Tamil-language film, directed by Rajaganapathy and produced by G. Kanakasubbu. The film stars Sivaji Ganesan, K. R. Vijaya, Poornam Viswanathan and Prabhu. It was released on 16 March 1984, and failed at the box office.

== Cast ==
- Sivaji Ganesan as Manaalan
- K. R. Vijaya as Valli
- Poornam Viswanathan
- Prabhu as Nagesh / Suresh
- Ambika as Latha
- M. N. Nambiar
- Gandhimathi
- Y. G. Mahendran
- V. K. Ramasamy
- S. Varalakshmi
- Kallapetti Singaram
- Silk Smitha as an item girl

== Production ==
The song "Naanthanya Silk" was shot at Singapore Palace at Mandavelli, Chennai. The song "Ondra Renda" was shot at Vijaya Gardens.

== Soundtrack ==
The music was composed by M. S. Viswanathan and lyrics were written by Puratchi Daasan.

Track listing
No.	Title	Singer(s)	Length
1.	"Sindhanai Thondri"	T. M. Soundararajan
2.	"Polla Pokkiri"	Malaysia Vasudevan
3.	"Onna Renda"	Malaysia Vasudevan, Sasikala
4.	"Naanthanya Silk"	Vani Jairam, Vijay Ramani
5.	"Aaya Kadai"	T. M. Soundararajan, Vijay Ramani
6.	"Pogathan"	T. M. Soundararajan
