= Neethibathi =

- Theatrical release poster
- Directed by: R. Krishnamoorthy
- Story by: Satyanand
- Produced by: Suresh Balaji
- Starring: Sivaji Ganesan; K. R. Vijaya
- Cinematography: K. S. Prasad
- Edited by: V.Chakkarapani
- Music by: Gangai Amaran
- Production company: Suresh Arts
- Release date: 26 January 1983
- Country: India
- Language: Tamil

Neethibathi (transl. Judge) is a 1983 Indian Tamil-language legal drama film directed by R. Krishnamoorthy and produced by Suresh Balaji. The film stars Sivaji Ganesan and K. R. Vijaya. It is a remake of the 1982 Telugu film Justice Chowdary. The film was released on 26 January 1983.

== Plot ==
Rajasekar is a skilled prosecutor with a wife named Radha, a police inspector son named Shankar, and a mute daughter named Geetha. Sattanathan is a defense attorney and a bitter professional rival of Rajasekar. He offers advice and guidance to Kalidas, the leader of a diamond smuggling gang. Rajasekar had earlier successfully argued for Kalidas's twin brother Ranjith to be hanged for his crimes, which had created animosity between them. Despite this, Rajasekar is appointed as a judge, bypassing Sattanathan. As a judge, Rajasekar sentences Kalidas's other brother Jagan to life imprisonment. This event triggers Sattanathan and Kalidas to plan to bring Rajasekar down.

Thyagu is a mechanic and car racer who is determined to build a large house for his imprisoned mother, Janaki. Janaki was a single mother who took the blame for a murder Thyagu committed as a child trying to protect her. Thyagu begins to work for Kalidas by driving getaway vehicles. He also falls in love with Devi, Sattanathan's daughter. When Devi learns of Thyagu's criminal activities, she convinces him to give up crime and start anew. However, just as he is ready to walk away from crime, Thyagu learns that his father, whom he believes abandoned Janaki, is none other than Rajasekar. This discovery enrages him, and he teams up with Kalidas and Sattanathan to destroy Rajasekar. Together, they plot to make Geetha's husband abandon her and have Shankar arrested on false charges. Meanwhile, Janaki is released from prison, and Rajasekar learns about the conspirators against him. He must now uncover deeply buried truths about his family and outsmart those against him.

== Cast ==
- Sivaji Ganesan as Justice Rajasekar
- K. R. Vijaya as Radha
- Sujatha as Janaki
- V. K. Ramasamy as Lawyer Sattanathan
- Manorama as Arogyamary a. k. a Lucy
- Radhika as Devi
- Prabhu as Thyagu
- R. N. Sudarshan as Kalidas and Ranjith
- Menaka as Geetha
- Sathyakala as Uma
- Vijayakumar as Ramesh (guest role)
- Ceylon Manohar as Mano
- Y. G. Mahendran as Anthony
- V. Gopalakrishnan as Boopathy
- Poornam Viswanathan as Radha's father
- Natarajan Ramji as Raja's Son
- Silk Smitha dancer in the song "Muthedukkum Aasaiyile"

== Soundtrack ==
The soundtrack was composed by Gangai Amaran.

Track listing
| No. | Title | Lyrics | Singer(s) | Length |
|---|---|---|---|---|
| 1. | "Muthedukkum Aasaiyile" | Gangai Amaran | S. P. Balasubrahmanyam, S. Janaki |
| 2. | "Thanthai Naan" | Vaali | T. M. Soundararajan |
| 3. | "Police Namakku" | Vaali | Malaysia Vasudevan, Vani Jairam |
| 4. | "Pasamalare" | Vaali | T. M. Soundararajan, P. Susheela, S. P. Sailaja |
| 5. | "Oru Devathai" | Vaali | S. P. Balasubrahmanyam, Vani Jairam |

== Critical reception ==
Ananda Vikatan called it yet another Ganesan film to be watched, enjoyed and disliked. Thiraignani of Kalki praised the acting of Ganesan but felt the film is not that flashy as much as the list of actors is flashy. Balumani of Anna praised the acting, dialogues, music and humour but criticised the inclusion of an item number.
