= Thiruppam =

- Poster
- Directed by: R. Krishnamoorthy
- Screenplay by: A. L. Narayanan (dialogues)
- Story by: K. D. Shorey
- Produced by: K. R. Gangadharan
- Starring: Sivaji Ganesan; Sujatha; Prabhu; Jaishankar
- Cinematography: K. S. Prasad
- Music by: M. S. Viswanathan
- Production company: K. R. G. Film Circuit
- Release date: 14 January 1984
- Country: India
- Language: Tamil

Thiruppam is a 1984 Indian Tamil-language action film directed by R. Krishnamoorthy and produced by K. R. Gangadharan. The film stars Sivaji Ganesan, Sujatha, Prabhu and Jaishankar. A remake of the 1980 Hindi film Be-Reham, it was released on 14 January 1984.

== Plot ==
Sivaji is an on-hands, honest, brave IG of police while Prabhu is an upcoming inspector who aspires to be like Sivaji. Sivaji is now single but was once in love with singer Sujatha who left him and ran away with someone else. Ambika is a press reporter who haunts, taunts and fails trying to bait Sivaji and Prabhu eventually falling in love with the latter.

Sujatha is married to Vijayakumar who marries her only to make money off her. He tortures her otherwise which she bears. One day, accidentally, Sujatha meets Sivaji, and he learns that she had left him at the bequest of his father. He also learns that she has a daughter and that her husband tortures her. Her husband, after overhearing a little of their conversation, plans to blackmail Sivaji. She, in rage, kills him in Sivaji's presence. This case becomes the focal point of confrontation between Sivaji, Prabhu and Ambika with Sujatha killing herself during interrogation.

Sivaji works hard to hide his association with Sujatha so that he can arrange to help his daughter. In the end, Prabhu and Ambika corner Sivaji with evidence only to find out that he has cancer and has days to live, which is why he chose to spend those days helping the daughter rather than in prison. The two team up and catch a notorious gang with Sivaji dying in the process. Ambika and Prabhu adopt the daughter.

== Cast ==
- Sivaji Ganesan
- Sujatha
- Prabhu
- Vijayakumar
- Jaishankar
- Ambika
- S. Varalakshmi
- Thengai Srinivasan
- Y. G. Mahendran

== Soundtrack ==
The music was composed by M. S. Viswanathan.

Song	Singers
"Thangamagal Allithanthal"	S. P. Balasubrahmanyam, S. Janaki
"Enai Marandhu Paaduven"	T.M. Soundararajan
"En Sindamani En Soodamani"	Malaysia Vasudevan, S. Janaki
"Ragangal En Jeevithangal"	P. Susheela

== Critical reception ==
Jayamanmadhan of Kalki praised the acting of Sivaji Ganesan. Balumani of Anna praised the acting, cinematography, dance, stunts and dialogues.
