= Vamsa Vilakku =

- Theatrical release poster
- Directed by: R. Krishnamoorthy
- Produced by: S. R. Arulprakasam
- Starring: Sivaji Ganesan; K. R. Vijaya; Prabhu; M. N. Nambiar
- Cinematography: N. Balakrishnan
- Music by: Gangai Amaran
- Production company: Rathna Movies
- Release date: 23 October 1984
- Country: India
- Language: Tamil

Vamsa Vilakku (transl. Lamp of the Dynasty) is a 1984 Indian Tamil-language film, directed by R. Krishnamoorthy and produced by S. R. Arulprakasam. The film stars Sivaji Ganesan, K. R. Vijaya, Prabhu, and M. N. Nambiar. It is a remake of the 1982 Hindi film Vidhaata. The film was released on 23 October 1984.

== Plot ==
Sathyamoorthy lives with his son, Shankar, a police inspector, and his pregnant daughter-in-law, Padma. When Shankar is killed while trying to arrest the criminal Jaganath, Sathyamoorthy avenges his death by killing two of Jaganath's associates, becoming a wanted man. After Padma dies during childbirth, he takes his infant grandson, Raja, and goes on the run. Along the way, he saves the life of Tiger Baba, a notorious smuggler, who then takes Sathyamoorthy under his wing.

Now a wealthy smuggler known as Chakravarthy, Sathyamoorthy meets the widowed Thaaiyamma and entrusts her with raising Raja in Coonoor, away from his criminal life. Years later, Chakravarthy and Raja reunite, though Raja remains unaware of his grandfather's true identity and profession. Raja falls in love with Radha, a courageous and principled young woman from a poor background. Chakravarthy, disapproving of her poverty, opposes their relationship, causing a rift between him, Raja, and Thaaiyamma.

As Jaganath resurfaces, Chakravarthy must confront his past, seek justice for his son's murder, and reconcile with his grandson.

== Cast ==
- Sivaji Ganesan as Sathyamoorthy/Chakravarthy
- K. R. Vijaya as Thaiyamma
- Prabhu as Inspector Shankar and Raja
- Radhika as Radha
- M. N. Nambiar as Jaganath
- V. K. Ramasamy as Dharma
- Major Sundarrajan as Tiger Baba
- R. N. Sudarshan as Manohar
- Nalini in guest appearance as Padma
- V. Gopalakrishnan as Ganapathy
- Y. G. Mahendran as Peter
- Sivachandran as Ravi
- Ceylon Manohar

== Soundtrack ==
The soundtrack was composed by Gangai Amaran.

Song	Singers	Length
"Manithan Kathai Ithu"	S. P. Balasubrahmanyam, Malaysia Vasudevan	04:27
"Vaa Mama"	S. Janaki	04:39
"Paasam Pozhiyum"	Malaysia Vasudevan, S. V. Ponnusamy	04:41
"Vaamma Vaa"	S. P. Balasubrahmanyam, S. Janaki	04:12

== Reception ==
Jayamanmadhan of Kalki praised the acting of Ganesan but felt the other actors were underutilised, adding that director Krishnamoorthy is not someone who thinks cleverly and let the guns do the talking and called Gangai Amaran's music average.
