= Gnanapazham =

- VCD cover
- Directed by: R. P. Viswam
- Written by: K. Bhagyaraj
- Produced by: K. Gopinathan
- Starring: K. Bhagyaraj; Sukanya; Vineetha; Rekha
- Cinematography: S. Jayachandran
- Edited by: S. M. V. Subbu
- Music by: K. Bhagyaraj
- Production company: Bagavathi Creations
- Release date: 15 November 1996
- Country: India
- Language: Tamil

Gnanapazham (pronounced [ɲaːɳappːaɻam] transl. Fruit of wisdom) is a 1996 Indian Tamil-language film directed R. P. Viswam and written by K. Bhagyaraj who also composed the music. The film stars Bhagyaraj, Sukanya, Vineetha and Rekha. It was released on 15 November 1996.

== Cast ==
- K. Bhagyaraj as Gnanasuryan
- Rekha as Nirmala
- Sukanya as Aarthi
- Vineetha as Thakkali Jothi
- Kasthuri as Aarthi's Navel Massager
- Viswam as Rathnam
- S. N. Lakshmi as Gnanasuryan's mother
- Prabhu Deva as Prabhu
- Goundamani as Aarthi's brother
- Senthil as Azhagu, Aarthi's car driver
- Mayilsamy as Bar Owner
- Junior Balaiah as Sathyamoorthy's assistant
- Kovai Senthil as Kanthasamy (Building contractor)

== Soundtrack ==
The soundtrack was composed by K. Bhagyaraj. Pa. Vijay made his debut as lyricist with this film.

Track listing
No.	Title	Lyrics	Singer(s)	Length
1.	"Manimaada"	Pa. Vijay	S. P. Balasubrahmanyam	5:00
2.	"Marina Beach"	Pa. Vijay	Malgudi Subha	5:16
3.	"Onnum Onnum"	Pulamaipithan	Harini, K. Bhagyaraj	1:51
4.	"Unnaipol"	Pa. Vijay	Mano	4:52
5.	"Yaarum Illadha"	Pa.Vijay	Sujatha, P. Unnikrishnan	5:31
6.	"Hey Sayorana"	Kalidasan	Mano, Suresh Peters, Swarnalatha	4:46
Total length:				27:16

== Reception ==
R. P. R. of Kalki praised Sukanya's performance and technical elements which previous films of Bhagyaraj lacked in but felt the film lacked trademark humour of Bhagyaraj and the film's climax suffers from artificiality and concluded calling it a mutual disappointment for Bhagyaraj and his fans.
