= Pathar Ke Insan =

- Poster
- Directed by: Shomu Mukherjee
- Written by: Tanveer Khan (dialogue)
- Story by: K. Bhagyaraj
- Produced by: Shomu Mukherjee
- Starring: Vinod Khanna; Sridevi; Jackie Shroff; Poonam Dhillon
- Cinematography: Aloke Dasgupta
- Edited by: Keshav Hirani
- Music by: Bappi Lahiri
- Release date: 15 January 1990
- Country: India
- Language: Hindi

Patthar Ke Insaan (transl. Man of Stone) is a 1990 Indian Bollywood film directed and produced by Shomu Mukherjee. It stars Vinod Khanna, Jackie Shroff,and Sridevi in pivotal roles and Poonam Dhillon makes a special appearance. The film was released on 15 January 1990, Indian Army Day, and was dedicated to the memory of Sashadhar Mukherjee, Shomu Mukherjee's father and founder of Filmalaya Studio. The film was a remake of Vidiyum Varai Kaathiru.

== Cast ==
- Vinod Khanna as Arjun
- Sridevi as Lata Rai
- Jackie Shroff as Police Inspector Karan
- Poonam Dhillon as Seeta Rai (Sp. Appearance)
- Moon Moon Sen as Rita (Sp. Appearance)
- Amita Nangia as Jyoti
- Saeed Jaffrey as Balwant Rai
- Om Shivpuri as Dr. Prashant
- Subbiraj as Rai Bahadur Dinanath
- Satish Shah as Ram Singh

== Plot ==
Industrialist Balwant Rai is a philanthropic, hard working family man, having two daughters, elder Sita Rai and younger Lata Rai, heiress to their grandfather's industrial empire being run by their father and custodian Dr. Prashant, who wants to grab their empire and schemes and plots with the workers.

Arjun is a diligent worker and Karan as police officer, is assigned the task of protecting the interests of the Rai family. Sita is an Indian classical music enthusiast, whereas Lata is an Indian classical dance maestro. Both want to prove the supremacy of their arts in the court of Goddess Saraswati and Nataraja, Hindu deities God Shiva, echelons to same, and hold a competition. Lata wins the competition by a quirk of luck, despite both sisters being of equal rank in their performance. This disheartens Sita, who grabs her black Fiat, drives recklessly to kill herself, but ends up hitting Jyoti, who is about to get married and is the sister of Arjun. She is followed by Lata in a white Hindustan Ambassador, who also bypasses the dying Jyoti, but is unable to stop Sita from killing herself by leaping from a cliff. Lata blames herself for the death of Sita and loses her mental balance. Meanwhile, Arjun vows to revenge his sister Jyoti's death, joins the gang of villains in Dr. Prashant's gang, and by a series of planned events, enters the Rai household as husband of Lata. He plans to kill Lata with Dr. Prashant, to whom he has pledged the Rai family empire in the deal. But fate has other things in store for him when he discovers the love of Lata and his misunderstandings. Before he can recover from his false Stupor, he is trapped by police officer Karan who also loves Lata, and taken into custody, for conspiracy.

The film ends in Kali temple, where Lata is taken for human sacrifice by the goons of Dr. Prashant, where in a scuffle and action, victory over evil prevails, but Karan loses his life in an attempt to save Arjun, who is a reformed man and dear to Lata.

== Soundtrack ==
Anjaan had written the song "Chumma do", while Indeevar had written the rest of songs.

#	Title	Singer(s)
1	"Chumma Do"	Bappi Lahiri, Sapna Mukherjee
2	"Tu Hi Meri Prem Kahani"	Mohammed Aziz, Alka Yagnik
3	"Chhod Chala"	Alisha Chinai
4	"Pathar Ke Insan"	Amit Kumar, Alka Yagnik
5	"Baandh Lo Ghungroo"	Amit Kumar, S. Janaki
6	"Suraj Nache Sagar Nache"	Kavita Krishnamurthy
7	"Kaali Mata"	Amit Kumar, Anuradha Paudwal
