= 12th Cinema Express Awards =

1992 Indian film awards ceremony

- Date: 1992

Highlights
- Best Picture: Chinna Thambi

The 12th Cinema Express Awards were held on 22 April 1992, and honoured the best of South Indian films released in 1991. The awards were announced in February.

== Tamil ==
Category	Recipient	Film
Best Film	Balu	Chinna Thambi
Best Actor	Rajinikanth	Thalapathi
Best Actress	Khushbu	Chinna Thambi
Best Actor (Special Award)	Kamal Haasan	Gunaa
Best Actress (Special Award)	Gautami	Nee Pathi Naan Pathi
Best Director	P. Vasu	Chinna Thambi
Best Character Actor	Vijayakumar	Cheran Pandian
Best Character Actress	Srividya	Thalapathi
Best Story Writer	K. Bhagyaraj	Pavunnu Pavunuthan
Best Dialogue Writer	Balakumaran	Gunaa
Best Lyrics Writer	Gangai Amaran	Dharma Durai
Best New Face Actor	Rajkiran	En Rasavin Manasile
Best New Face Actress	Sukanya	Pudhu Nellu Pudhu Naathu
Best New Face Director	Kathir	Idhayam
Best Villain	Anandaraj	Maanagara Kaaval
Best Music Director	Deva	Pudhu Manithan and Vasanthakala Paravai
Best Cameraman	Rajarajan	Captain Prabhakaran
Best Dance Master	D. K. S. Babu	Various
Best Stunt Master	Super Subbarayan	Various
Best Comedy Actor	Goundamani	Chinna Thambi
Best Comedy Actress	Manorama	Pondatti Sonna Kettukanum
Best Playback Singer (Male)	Mano	Chinna Thambi
Best Playback Singer (Female)	Swarnalatha	Chinna Thambi
Best Child Artist	Master Silambarasan	Shanti Enathu Shanti

== Telugu ==
Category	Recipient	Film
Best Film	V. Doraswamiraju	Seetharamayya Gari Manavaralu
Best Actor	Akkineni Nageswara Rao	Seetharamayya Gari Manavaralu
Best Actress	Meena	Seetharamayya Gari Manavaralu
Best Director	Kranthi Kumar	Seetharamayya Gari Manavaralu

== Malayalam ==
Category	Recipient	Film
Best Film	G. Jayakumar	Perumthachan
Best Actor	Thilakan	Perumthachan
Best Actress	Revathi	Kilukkam
Best Director	Priyadarshan	Kilukkam

== Solidaire excellency awards ==
Awards in this field were given to film producer G. Venkateswaran, playback singer S. Janaki, art director Thota Tharani and special effects artist Venky.
