= Oru Kai Osai =

1980 film by K. Bhagyaraj

- VCD cover
- Directed by: K. Bhagyaraj
- Written by: K. Bhagyaraj
- Produced by: K. Bhagyaraj
- Starring: K. Bhagyaraj; Ashwini
- Cinematography: B. S. Pasavaraj
- Edited by: R. Bhaskaran
- Music by: M. S. Viswanathan
- Production company: Ammulu Productions
- Release date: 25 July 1980
- Running time: 140 minutes
- Country: India
- Language: Tamil

Oru Kai Osai (transl. The sound of one hand) is a 1980 Indian Tamil-language film, written, produced and directed by K. Bhagyaraj, starring himself and Ashwini. It was released on 25 July 1980. The film created an impact and was well received by the audience for its unique characterisation and unexpected climax. It won the Tamil Nadu State Film Award Special Prize, and was remade in Telugu as Pranaya Geetham (1981).

== Plot ==
Dr. Amaravathi, seeking a peaceful life, enters the village of Vellankoil after rejecting a few other villages. She witnesses Chinna Pannai attempting to commit suicide on a railway track, but fate intervenes, and the train passes on the adjacent track. Amaravathi's medical skills are soon put to use when she treats a child who fell from a tree. The child's mother offers her a place to stay in gratitude. Repeatedly, Amaravathi encounters Chinna Pannai's botched suicide attempts. She confronts him, and he reveals that his disability, resulting from a traumatic childhood experience, has made him feel life is meaningless. Amaravathi treats Chinna Pannai, and he eventually develops feelings for her. Meanwhile, Mangatha, Chinna Pannai's cousin, has a long-standing crush on him despite his disability. Mangatha asks Pannaiyar, her guardian and Chinna Pannai's father, to arrange her marriage to Chinna Pannai. However, Pannaiyar is hesitant due to societal pressure and seeks a groom who is not disabled for Mangatha. Mangatha's determination to marry Chinna Pannai is tested when she discovers his love for Amaravathi. Heartbroken, Mangatha renounces her feelings for Chinna Pannai.

Sangili, the village guardsman, is feared by the villagers due to his intimidating presence. He collects protection money from each household, but Amaravathi refuses to pay. When Minor, a nearby village landlord, sends his men to abduct Amaravathi, Sangili intervenes, protecting her. This act earns him Amaravathi's respect. Meanwhile, Chinna Pannai grows closer to Amaravathi and signals his desire to marry her, but she rejects him, leaving him heartbroken. Amaravathi consoles him, and he slowly recovers. Amaravathi's past is revealed when her toddler daughter, Ganga, and her cousin arrive in the village. Amaravathi shares her story with Chinna Pannai, explaining that she became pregnant out of wedlock after her lover's tragic death in a train accident. To avoid family disgrace, she left home and eventually found her way to Vellankoil. Ganga quickly bonds with Chinna Pannai, and he becomes protective of her. When Amaravathi scolds Ganga, Chinna Pannai slaps Amaravathi in anger, leading to a confrontation with Amaravathi's cousin.

Despite the tension, Chinna Pannai's care and concern for Ganga's health touch Amaravathi's heart. He performs elaborate rituals to ensure Ganga's well-being. Also, Mangatha, who had previously renounced her love for Chinna Pannai, finds herself drawn to Amaravathi's cousin brother while helping with household chores. Their innocence and interactions spark a mutual attraction between them. Sangili orders the villagers to boycott Minor's fields due to his misbehavior. In retaliation, Minor contaminates the well water with pesticides. Chinna Pannai overhears the plan and informs Sangili, who confronts Minor's goons. In the ensuing fight, Sangili kills Minor but succumbs to a fatal stab wound. Before his death, Sangili requests that the villagers be treated equally, without caste-based discrimination. Chinna Pannai later gets into a brawl with some villagers who mock Ganga's parentage and his relationship with Amaravathi. As punishment, he's isolated from the village for seven days.

During this time, Ganga tries to cross the flooding river to see him, and Chinna Pannai saves her, regaining his voice in the process, but remains mute with the decision to speak with Amaravathi first. Amaravathi feeling that Chinna Pannai would be a good father to Ganga, decides to marry Chinna Pannai. On their wedding day, Amaravathi is shocked to see her long-lost lover, whom she thought had died in a train accident. It's revealed that he was mistaken for a thief who died in the accident, and he had been detained by railway police due to a pickpocketing incident. Amaravathi's lover asks her to move forward with her new life with Chinna Pannai, but Chinna Pannai selflessly unites Amaravathi with her lover and arranges a double wedding, also uniting Mangatha with Amaravathi's cousin brother. Heartbroken, Chinna Pannai decides to pretend to be dumb forever after failing in his love for Amaravathi.

== Cast ==
- K. Bhagyaraj as Chinna Pannai
- Ashwini as Dr. Amaravathi
- K. K. Soundar as Pannaiyar, Chinna Pannai's father
- Kallapetti Singaram as Marappan, tea shop owner
- M. V. Murugan as Sangili
- Natarajan as Minor
- Ponni as Mangatha, Chinna Pannai's cousin
- Meenakshi paatti as an elderly woman in the village
- Baby Lakshmi as Ganga, Amaravathi's daughter
- Ramli as Ramalingam, Pannaiyar's servant
- Senthil as Senthil, villager
- V. R. Thilagam as a villager who offers shelter to Amaravathi
- John Amirtharaj as Karupattikarar, villager who owns puppy (uncredited)

== Production ==
Oru Kai Osai is Bhagyaraj's second film as a director. It is the debut film for Kovai Senthil. The main theme of the film is casteism, which Bhagyaraj based on his experiences in Vellankoil, Gobichettipalayam and the film was entirely shot there itself. The doctor character played by Ashwini was partially inspired by Bhagyaraj's mother.

== Soundtrack ==
The music composed by M. S. Viswanathan. The song "Muthuthaaragai" is set in the Carnatic raga Charukesi.

Song	Singers	Lyrics
Naan Neerodaiyil	S. Janaki	Chidambaranathan
Muthu Tharagai vaana Veedhi	S. P. Balasubrahmanyam, P. Susheela	Viswam
Selai Illai	M. S. Viswanathan	Bairavi
Machchaane Vaangaiya	L. R. Eswari	Muthulingam

== Release and reception ==
Oru Kai Osai was released on 25 July 1980, delayed from June. Kanthan of Kalki lauded Bhagyaraj's performance as a mute man, but played on the film's title by calling it "oru pakkam vendha dosai" (dosa fried on only one side). Pa. Vanmathi of Anna praised Bhagyaraj's acting and noted the film does not bore anywhere and it can be enjoyed by everyone. The film won the Tamil Nadu State Film Award Special Prize. Murugan, who portrayed the character Sangili adapted that name as his prefix.
