= Tamil Nadu State Film Award Special Prize =

Indian film award

The Awards are presented by the Government of Tamil Nadu State honouring the best performance and best films of every calendar year. The Special Prize (Jury) are generally presented for Best Actor, Best Actress and Best Films categories.

== Recipients ==
Here is a list of the award winners and the films for which they won.

- The year mentioned refers to the year in which the films released.

This is the list of Winners of Jury's Special Award

Year	Winner	Awarded For	Film	Ref.
2022	Appukutty	Actor	Vazhga Vivasayi	
2022	Dushara Vijayan	Actress	Natchathiram Nagargiradhu	
2022	–	Film	Iravin Nizhal	
2021	Pasupathy	Actor	Sarpatta Parambarai	
2021	Amrutha Srinivasan	Actress	Irudhi Pakkam	
2021	–	Film	Rs 2000	
2020	Tharun	Actor	Thaen	
2020	Abarnathi	Actress	Thaen	
2020	–	Film	Thaen	
2019	Karthi	Actor	Kaithi	
2019	Indhuja Ravichandran	Actress	Magamuni	
2019	–	Film	KD	
2018	Vishnu Vishal	Actor	Ratsasan	
2018	Aishwarya Rajesh	Actress	Kanaa Vada Chennai	
2018	–	Film	Seethakaathi	
2017	Santhosh Sreeram	Actor	To Let	
2017	Andrea Jeremiah	Actress	Taramani	
2017	–	Film	To Let	
2016	Guru Somasundaram	Actor	Joker	
2016	Aditi Balan	Actress	Aruvi	
2016	–	Film	Manusangada	
2015	Gautham Karthik	Actor	Vai Raja Vai	
2015	Ritika Singh	Actress	Irudhi Suttru	
2015	–	Film	Irudhi Suttru	
2014	Bobby Simha	Actor	Jigarthanda	
2014	Anandhi	Actress	Kayal	
2014	–	Film	Kaaka Muttai	
2013	Vijay Sethupathi; Nazriya Nazim —	Actor; Actress; Film	Pannaiyarum Padminiyum, Idharkuthane Aasaipattai Balakumara; Neram; Aal	
2012	Vikram Prabhu; Samantha Ruth Prabhu —	Actor; Actress; Film	Kumki; Neethane En Ponvasantham; Kumki	
2011	Sivakarthikeyan; Anushka Shetty —	Actor; Actress; Film	Marina; Deiva Thirumagal; Marina	
2010	Y. G. Mahendra; Sangeetha —	Actor; Actress; Film	Puthran; Puthran; Namma Gramam	
2009	Prasanna; Anjali —	Actor; Actress; Film	Achamundu Achamundu; Angadi Theru	
2008	Suriya; Trisha —	Actor; Actress; Film	Vaaranam Aayiram; Abhiyum Naanum; Meipporul	
2007	Sathyaraj; Padmapriya Janakiraman —	Actor; Actress; Film	Periyar; Mirugam; Periyar	
2006	Guinness Pakru & Karthi; Sandhya —	Actors; Actress; Film	Dishyum & Paruthiveeran; Dishyum; Ilakanam	
2005	Vijay & Suriya; Meera Jasmine —	Actors; Actress; Film	Thirupaachi & Ghajini; Kasthuri Maan; Priyasakhi	
2004	Kutty; Sandhya —	Actor; Actress; Film	Dancer; Kaadhal; M. Kumaran Son Of Mahalakshmi	
2003	Srikanth; Meera Vasudevan —	Actor; Actress; Film	Parthiban Kanavu; Unnai Charanadainthen; Kamaraj	
2002	Prabhu; Nandita Das —	Actor; Actress; Film	Charlie Chaplin; Kannathil Muthamittal; King	
2001	Ajith; Suvalakshmi —	Actor; Actress; Film	Poovellam Un Vasam; Jameela; Nandhaa	
2000	Jayaram; Shalini Kumar —	Actor; Actress; Film	Thenali; Alai Payuthey; Bharathi	
1999	Vikram; Ramya Krishnan —	Actor; Actress; Film	Sethu; Padayappa; Sethu	
1998	Karthik; Revathi —	Actor; Actress	Pooveli, Unnidathil Ennai Koduthen; Thalaimurai; House Full	
1997	Napoleon; Khushbu —	Actor; Actress; Film	Ettupatti Rasa; Paththini); Raman Abdullah	
1996	Vijayakanth; Devayani —	Actor; Actress; Film	Thayagam; Kadhal Kottai; Karuvelam Pookkal	
1995	Vijayakumar; Radhika —	Actor; Actress; Film	Anthimanthaarai; Pasum Ponn & Rani Maha Rani; Indira	
1994	Nagesh; Urvashi —	Actor; Actress; Film	Nammavar; Magalir Mattum; Mogamull	
1993	Vijayakumar; Rupini —	Actor; Actress; Film	Kizhakku Cheemayile; Pathini Penn; Mahanadhi	
1992	Nassar; Madhoo —	Actor; Actress; Film	Aavarampoo; Roja; Vaaname Ellai	
1991	Rajkiran; Banupriya —	Actor; Actress; Film	En Rasavin Manasile; Azhagan; Cheran Pandiyan	
1990	Sathyaraj; Gautami —	Actor; Actress; Film	Nadigan; Namma Ooru Poovatha; Anjali	
1989	Radha Ravi; Bhanupriya —	Actor; Actress; Film	Solaikuyil; Aararo Aariraro; Karagattakaran	
1988	Karthik; Radhika —	Actor; Actress; Film	Agni Natchathiram; Poonthotta Kaavalkaaran; Idhu Namma Aalu	
1987	No Award			
1986	No Award			
1985	No Award			
1984	No Award			
1983	No Award			
1982-83	Rajinikanth; Sujatha —	Actor; Actress; Film	Moondru Mugam; Thunaivi & Paritchaikku Neramaachu; Moondru Mugam	
1980-81	Bhagyaraj —	Actor; Film	Oru Kai Oosai; Oru Kai Oosai	
1979-80	Delhi Ganesh; Manorama	Actor; Actress	Pasi; Avan Aval Adhu	
1978-79	Rajinikanth; Sripriya -	Actor; Actress; Film	Mullum Malarum; Aval Appadithan; Varuvan Vadivelan	
1977-78	Muthuraman; Srividya —	Actor; Actress; Film	Balaparitchai; Madhurageetham; Maduraiyai Meetta Sundara Pandian	
1976	No Award			
1975	No Award			
1974	No Award			
1973	No Award			
1972	No Award			
1971	No Award			
1970		Film	Thirumalai Thenkumari	

== See also ==
- Tamil cinema
- Cinema of India
