= Ponnu Pakka Poren =

1989 film by N. Murugesh

- Theatrical release poster
- Directed by: N. Murugesh
- Screenplay by: V. Sekhar
- Story by: K. Bhagyaraj
- Produced by: T. Subbulakshmi
- Starring: Prabhu; Seetha
- Cinematography: V. Ramamoorthy
- Edited by: M. G. Balurao
- Music by: K. Bhagyaraj
- Production company: Lakshmi Raja Films
- Release date: 22 December 1989
- Country: India
- Language: Tamil

Ponnu Pakka Poren (transl. I am going to look for a bride) is a 1989 Indian Tamil-language romantic drama film directed by N. Murugesh. The film stars Prabhu and Seetha. It was released on 22 December 1989.

== Plot ==
Madhanagopal, a government agriculture official whose job involves transfers to various villages, arrives in a village plagued by leopard attacks. Following a harrowing encounter with a leopard, he is rescued by Kasthuri (Seetha) the village chieftain's daughter. As they frequently cross paths, their playful banter blossoms into romance. Meanwhile, Vembu (Prabhu), a recent village arrival, reconnects with Kasthuri and her family, having known them from his hometown. There, Kasthuri and his sister Devaki were childhood classmates. Devaki's aspirations to become a doctor filled Vembu with pride. Although Vembu harbors feelings for Kasthuri, their relationship remains platonic, lacking reciprocation from Kasthuri. However, his life takes a devastating turn upon permanently returning from his hometown, bearing tragic news: Devaki's untimely passing. Consumed by grief and anger, Vembu descends into alcoholism.

Kasthuri offers Vembu compassion and kindness, embracing him as a brother, for which Vembu reciprocates, vowing to renounce alcohol. He also protects Kasthuri twice from a village thug's harassment, promising to ensure her union with Madhanagopal. Meanwhile, Kasthuri's mother receives a disturbing revelation from the astrologer: Kasthuri's first marriage is doomed to fail, with only her second marriage promising longevity. Distraught at the prospect of her daughter's potential widowhood, Kasthuri's mother asks the village Iyer to perform expiatory rituals to mitigate Kasthuri's karma and safeguard her future husband's well-being. The astrologer however, remains skeptical about altering destiny.

Unbeknownst to Kasthuri, Madhanagopal harbors a dark past and sinister intentions. He is a playboy who has deceived women in previous villages with false marriage promises, exploiting them emotionally and physically before abandoning them upon transfer to a new village. He has one distinguishing trait though; drawing an image of the silhouette of a nude, seated woman at the bottom of every correspondence to his lovers.

Madhanagopal receives a new transfer order and frustrated by Kasthuri's refusal for intimacy before marriage, devises a deceitful plan. He writes a love letter, asking Kasthuri to meet him secretly at the village temple and manipulates Vembu into delivering it, hiding his true intentions. Vembu, recognizing the image on the letter realizes that Madhanagopal was the man responsible for his sister Devaki's tragic fate – a false promise of love and marriage, her pregnancy, abandonment, and eventual suicide due to shame and grief. Comparing the letter to Madhanagopal's past correspondence with Devaki, Vembu confirms the identical handwriting and image. Enraged, Vembu rushes to warn Kasthuri but is delayed when his motorcycle breaks down. Madhanagopal successfully executes his plan, tricking Kasthuri into a secret nighttime marriage, sans witnesses. He ties the thaali and consummation of their marriage union ensues. Intent on abandoning Kasthuri, Madhanagopal instructs her to walk ahead while he slips away to catch the midnight train to his new village job. However, an Indian cobra bites him, and he screams in agony. Kasthuri saves Madhanagopal using her thaali to constrict the wound, stemming the venom's flow and buying time for medical treatment. Upon recovery, seeing Kasthuri's pristine love and sacrifice, Madhanagopal reforms and returns to the village temple, pouring out his regrets to the deity, for his previous inhuman behaviour and vowing to remarry Kasthuri, now with genuine intentions.

En route to meet Kasthuri, Madhanagopal encounters Vembu, who beguiles him into the leopard territory, ferrying him in a coracle. Once on the opposite bank, Vembu unleashes his fury, thrashes and binds Madhanagopal to a tree and confronts him about his heinous past in causing his sister Devaki's suicide-- leaving him to face the leopards, despite Madhanagopal's desperate pleas for forgiveness and claims of redemption. Kasthuri arrives, overhearing the confrontation and reveals to Vembu that they got married the previous night, and her chastity is lost. Acknowledging Madhanagopal's deserving fate, Kasthuri insists on joining him in death, willing to face the approaching leopard. Vembu intervenes, fighting the leopard to save Kasthuri and emerges victorious. Moved by Kasthuri's devotion, Vembu forgives Madhanagopal, asking him to reaffirm their union by retying the thaali around Kasthuri's neck.

With Vembu's blessing, Madhanagopal and Kasthuri begin anew. As Vembu walks away in peace, the couple's reunited fate ironically fulfills the astrological prediction: Kasthuri's first marriage, in essence, didn't last, paving the way for a lasting second union.

== Cast ==
- Prabhu as Vembu, a hunter
- Seetha as Kasthuri
- Manohar as Madhanagopal
- Janagaraj as Balu
- Jai Ganesh as Ponnurangam, village chieftain and Kasthuri's father
- G. Srinivasan as an astrologer
- Samikannu as a vaidyar
- Kumarimuthu as a temple priest
- Textool Thangavel
- Idichapuli Selvaraj as a village headman
- Pollachi R. Radha
- Master Tinku as Ramu, astrologer's son
- Kovai Sarala as Kuppamma, owner of Kuppamma Kozhi Biriyani Hotel
- V. R. Thilagam as Kasthuri's mother
- Kovai Shanthi
- Sribala
- Deepika
- Kovai Senthil as a villager (uncredited)

== Production ==
Manohar, son of Sivaji Ganesan's elder brother Shanmugam made his acting debut with this film.

== Soundtrack ==
The soundtrack was composed by Bhagyaraj.

Track listing
No.	Title	Lyrics	Singer(s)	Length
1.	"Yerapooti"	Chinnakonar	K. Bhagyaraj	4:25
2.	"Dey Vembu"	Aazir	S. P. Balasubrahmanyam	4:38
3.	"Aavaram Poovu"	Kamakodiyan	S. Janaki	4:24
4.	"Aalana Naala"	Vaali	Malaysia Vasudevan, K. S. Chithra	4:13
5.	"Sala Sala Yena"	Vaali	S. P. Balasubrahmanyam, K. S. Chithra	3:58
6.	"Oru Nila"	Mu. Metha	Mano	3:50
Total length:				25:28

== Reception ==
P. S. S. of Kalki praised the acting of cast and Janagaraj's humour.
