= Mr. Bechara =

1996 romantic drama film

- Movie Poster
- Directed by: K. Bhagyaraj
- Written by: Nawab Arzoo (dialogues)
- Screenplay by: K. Bhagyaraj
- Story by: K. Bhagyaraj
- Based on: Veetla Visheshanga (1994) by K. Bhagyaraj
- Produced by: Nandu G Tolani
- Starring: Anil Kapoor; Sridevi
- Cinematography: K. S. Prakash Rao
- Edited by: A. Muthu
- Music by: Songs: Anand Milind; Background score: Surinder Sodhi
- Production company: Swapna Arts
- Release date: 30 August 1996
- Running time: 140 minutes
- Country: India
- Language: Hindi
- Budget: ₹3.75 crore (US$390,000)
- Box office: ₹5.84 crore (US$610,000)

Mr. Bechara (transl. Mr. Wretch) is a 1996 Hindi-language romantic drama film directed by K. Bhagyaraj and produced by Nandu G. Tolani, starring Anil Kapoor and Sridevi with Nagarjuna in a special appearance. The music was composed by Anand Milind. The film is a remake of Bhagyaraj's own Tamil film Veetla Visheshanga (1994).

== Plot ==
Anand Verma, a widower, and father of a child admit a woman into the hospital who had lost her memory. Since he admitted her, the doctor asks him to take care of her until she recovers from amnesia. The doctor names her Asha, which is the name of Anand's late wife and makes her believe that she is married to Anand and has a child. Due to the circumstances, Anand has to accept the situation and takes her to his house. Asha insists that she does not remember any incident about her life with Anand. To make her believe it, the doctor lies to her that she has a birthmark in the part of the body only known to her husband. He also places a photograph of hers with the wedding photo of Anand. Asha yet insists that she cannot remember anything but believes that Anand is her husband and she is a mother of his child.

She starts to live with Anand as his wife, which troubles him a lot as he knows that she is not his wife. She also showers affection on the child and gets attached to it. But she discovers a situation that whatever is told to her is not true and she is neither married to Anand nor is a mother of the child. Anand tells her to leave the house, but she says she cannot leave him or his child and wants to be with them forever. Anand is convinced by everybody and finally agrees to marry her. But Asha has an unknown fear that something might stop their marriage.

On the day of marriage, Asha sees someone as a groom, which confuses everyone. The groom sings a song which jogs Asha's memory. She is actually Anita and the groom is her lover named Ajay. When they were about to marry, they were stopped by goons because of which Anita fell from the mountain, survived with injuries, and lost her memory.

Now that her memory is back, Anand finds Ajay, brings him to Anita, and insists she marry him, as they are both lovers. Anita reluctantly accepts. When Ajay is tying the Mangal Sutra, Anita however stops him. She goes to Anand saying that he may not need her, but she needs him and the child. Seeing that motherly affection has overcome her, Ajay leaves. Anand and Anita finally get married.

== Cast ==
- Anil Kapoor as Anand Verma
- Sridevi as Anita
- Nagarjuna as Ajay (special appearance)
- Heera Rajagopal as Asha
- Anupam Kher as Dr. Dayanand
- Shakti Kapoor as Mr. Natwarlal "Romeo"
- Tiku Talsania as Inspector Narayan Mathur
- Avtar Gill as Police Superintendent Dsouza
- Mahavir Shah as Arvind Verma, Anita's/Asha's brother
- Shammi as Caretaker
- Pallavi
- Rakesh Bhanushali as Dum Dum
- Damini
- Manmauji
- Zain Slm
- Sonu Verma
- Yasmin
- Master Rakesh Bhanusal
- Baby Vandana
- Baby Akshay

== Soundtrack ==
Mr. Bechara

Film score by Anand–Milind
- Released: 1996
- Recorded: Tips Music
- Studio: Boney Kapoor Tips Industries
- Genre: Filmi
- Length: 37:03
- Label: TIPS Audio
- Producer: Anand–Milind

Anand–Milind chronology
Lahu Ke Do Rang (1996)	Mr. Bechara (1996)	Muqaddar (1996)

Soundtrack composed by Anand-Milind, with lyrics by Sameer and Nawab Arzoo. The music was released by TIPS Audio Company and became quite popular upon release. Most popular songs in album "Jaanam Meri Jaanam", "Khoyi Khoyi Aankhon Mein", "Saathi Mere Sun Toh Zara" etc.

No.	Title	Lyrics	Singer(s)	Length
1.	"Sadiyon Se Hum Tumhare"	Sameer	Udit Narayan, Sadhana Sargam	5:14
2.	"Sathi Mere Sun To Zara"	Sameer	Kumar Sanu, Alka Yagnik, Zain Slm	5:03
3.	"Lage Mujhe Sundar Har Ladki"	Sameer	Malgudi Subha	5:36
4.	"Janam Meri Janam"	Nawab Arzoo	Udit Narayan, Alka Yagnik	5:00
5.	"Nadhin Dhinna"	Sameer Anjaan	Purnima	4:52
6.	"Janam Meri Janam-II"	Nawab Arzoo	Kumar Sanu	5:00
7.	"Dekho Dekho Dekho Feture"	Sameer	Vinod Rathod, Sapna Mukherjee	6:18
Total length:				37:03
