= Chinna Veedu =

1985 film by K. Bhagyaraj

- Theatrical release poster
- Directed by: K. Bhagyaraj
- Written by: K. Bhagyaraj
- Produced by: C. K. Kannan; M. K. Ramachandran
- Starring: K. Bhagyaraj; Kalpana
- Cinematography: B. R. Vijayalakshmi
- Edited by: A. Selvanathan
- Music by: Ilaiyaraaja
- Production company: Jaya Vijaya Movies
- Distributed by: Sharanya Cine Combines
- Release date: 11 November 1985
- Running time: 143 minutes
- Country: India
- Language: Tamil

Chinna Veedu (lit. 'Small House'; colloquial meaning: "Mistress") is a 1985 Indian Tamil-language film written and directed by K. Bhagyaraj. It marks the Tamil debut for lead actress Kalpana. It was released on 11 November 1985. The film was remade in Kannada in 1990 as Chapala Chennigaraya.

== Plot ==
Set in 1983, Madanagopal is a bachelor in Coimbatore who dreams about his future wife being beautiful from head to toe. But his parents arrange his marriage with a girl from a rich influential family, Bhagyalakshmi. Madanagopal is shocked to see the photograph of his would-be wife as she is fat, unappealing, and nowhere near his expectations of his dream girl. His parents coerce himin to the wedding since Madanagopal's younger sister is to be wed to Bhagya's brother on the same day. On the day of marriage, he runs away from the marriage hall and tries to enlist as a soldier. Madanagopal's parents find him and convince him to marry her, as his sister marriage might be halted. He unwillingly marries Bhagya.

Gopal's marriage disappoints him. On the nuptial night, he yells at his wife about the forcible wedlock and how he cannot imagine her to be his wife who is no way suited to his personality. Bhagyalakshmi, though hurt deep in her heart by his body shaming, keeps quiet as an ideal wife. Both of them live in the same room, but do not consummate their marriage. Gopal feels that he made a sacrifice of his life by marrying a woman like Bhagyalakshmi, and so he does not respect his in-laws' family. She tolerates all of his stupid acts as she loves him and also has an inferiority complex about herself. Her father procures Gopal a coveted job in Mysore Bank using his influence and buys him a costly scooter.

Even after all this, Gopal does not stop dreaming about his dream girl and introduces himself as a bachelor to the women he meet. Chakravarthi, Bhagyalakshmi's brother, visits his sister's home and finds out about Gopal and his cheap mentality. He tails Gopal everywhere and informs his whereabouts to his sister. This angers Bhagyalakshmi and she yells at him to stay away from her husband. She tells Gopal to have a mistress for himself, to which Gopal pretends to be a sincere husband but he gets into dilemma on his wife's approval. Gopal's mother gets angry that her daughter has conceived, but Bhagyalakshmi shows no sign of pregnancy, and she taunts her a lot. Hence, Gopal seduces his wife, but reveals he did it for her sake as he feels pity for her. This hurts Bhagyalakshmi's self-respect and yells at him that she wants the love of her husband and not his pity.

Gopal is given a task of collecting the loan amount from a woman named Maragathambal and he goes in search of her. On the way he is stopped by a young woman who calls him to her home. She sells some vessels at her home and pays the loan installment. Gopal feels bad on that, and so he gets some time from the bank to repay the amount. The girl introduces herself as Banu, an unemployed woman and granddaughter of Maragathambal. Slowly a friendship develops between both of them, and he visits her home frequently. One day, Gopal becomes emotional while both are alone and seduces Banu. Banu forgives him for his act and asks him to marry her but gets shocked when she knows he is married. Gopal runs away from the place, feeling guilty of spoiling a homely girl's life. In reality, Banu is a prostitute who cunningly wants to trap Gopal by pretending to be an innocent girl. Bhagyalakshmi becomes pregnant, and Gopal turns his attention towards her to take good care of her, because of which he reduces the frequency of his visits to Banu. Banu understands that he is slowly escaping from her and blackmails him that she is also pregnant and compels him to marry her. She ties the sacred knot by herself when police come to arrest on a brothel case. Gopal accepts to them that he married Banu.

Gopal's family discover his relationship with another woman and shouts at him. But Bhagyalakshmi keeps quiet and calm and is confident that her husband will return to her. Meanwhile, Gopal discovers Banu's background and the woman who is not her grandmother, but her servant. He catches her red-handed and warns her that she should not interfere in his life anymore, and dumps her. Banu complains to police that Gopal married her as his second wife when his first wife is alive, and Gopal is arrested. Bhagyalakshmi meets Banu and tells her to leave her husband, to which Banu does not accept initially and threatens that she will face the consequences in court. But Bhayalakshmi shows all evidence of her past legal cases where Banu trapped men for money like how she trapped Gopal and so her case will not succeed. Banu gets furious and sets revenge on pregnant Bhagyalakshmi after Bhagyalakshmi leaves her house. Gopal convinces the police about Banu and struggles to save his wife, but Bhagyalakshmi is attacked by Banu's henchman when she tried to save her husband. She is admitted to the hospital, and after much serious treatment, delivers male triplets. Gopal reunites with his wife and children and lives happily.

== Cast ==
- K. Bhagyaraj as Madanagopal
- Kalpana as Bhagyalakshmi
- Anu (Babitha) as Banu
- Uma Rani
- Jai Ganesh as Bhagyalakshmi's father
- V. Gopalakrishnan as Doctor
- K. K. Soundar as Madanagopal's father
- Kovai Sarala as Madanagopal's mother
- Mayilsamy
- Chakri Toleti as Chakravarthy: Bhagyalakshmi's younger brother
- Kaja Shariff as Office Boy
- G. Hari Prasath
- Malini Vaman (uncredited) as dancer
- Priyasri (uncredited) as dancer

== Production ==
Kalpana, sister of actress Urvashi, made her debut in Tamil cinema with this film. Kovai Sarala portrayed the role of Bhagyaraj's mother at a young age. It was the first film in Tamil to introduce Vijayalakshmi as the first female cinematographer. During production, filming was suspended for four days as Bhagyaraj struggled to find the right dialogues to write for a scene; it was R. Parthiban who helped him.

== Soundtrack ==
The music was composed by Ilaiyaraaja. The song "Chittu Kuruvi" is set in the Pushpalathika raga, "Chittu Kuruvi" was later sampled by American rapper Junglepussy for the song "Satisfaction Guaranteed" (2014).

Song	Singers	Lyrics	Length
"Ada Machamulla"	S. P. Balasubrahmanyam, S. Janaki, S. P. Sailaja, T. V. Gopalakrishnan	Muthulingam	05:07
"Chittu Kuruvi"	S. P. Balasubrahmanyam, S. Janaki	Vairamuthu	04:33
"Jaakiratha Jaakiratha"	Ilaiyaraaja, Deepan Chakravarthy	Na. Kamarasan	03:45
"Jaamam Aagi Pochu"	Malaysia Vasudevan, K. S. Chithra	Kuruvikkarambai Shanmugam	04:33
"Vaa Vaa Samy"	S. P. Balasubrahmanyam, S. Janaki	Chinnakonar	04:30
"Vellai Manam"	Malaysia Vasudevan, Sunandha	Pulamaipithan	04:22

== Release and reception ==
Chinna Veedu's release was delayed because it was found to have similarities with other films like Gopurangal Saivathillai, Rosappu Ravikkaikari and Kanni Paruvathile. Jayamanmadhan of Kalki wrote despite being an old plot, Bhagyaraj has done only few changes in presenting the plot but praised the performances of Bhagyaraj, Kalpana, Jai Ganesh and Vijayalakshmi's cinematography. Balumani of Anna praised the acting, music, cinematography and direction. The film ran for over 100 days in theatres.
