= Rasukutty =

- Theatrical release poster
- Directed by: K. Bhagyaraj
- Written by: K. Bhagyaraj
- Produced by: Meena Panchu Arunachalam
- Starring: K. Bhagyaraj; Aishwarya
- Cinematography: M. C. Sekar
- Edited by: B. K. Mohaan
- Music by: Ilaiyaraaja
- Production company: P. A. Art Productions
- Release date: 25 October 1992
- Running time: 149 minutes
- Country: India
- Language: Tamil

Rasukutty (/rɑːsukutti/) is a 1992 Indian Tamil-language comedy drama film, written and directed by K. Bhagyaraj and produced by Meena Panchu Arunachalam. The film stars Bhagyaraj and Aishwarya, with Manorama and Kalyan Kumar in supporting roles. It was released on 25 October 1992. The film was remade in Hindi as Raja Babu (1994) and in Telugu as Abbayi Gari Pelli (1997).

== Plot ==
Rasukutty, the only son of wealthy landlord Periyapannai, dropped out of school at a young age. His mother, Eswari spoils him, but his father constantly urges him to become a responsible man. Rasukutty spends his father's wealth aimlessly, accompanied by his sidekick Sembuli. Periyapannai's brother, Chinnapannai, manages his brother's land and farm with his son, Sengodan. However, they misappropriate Periyapannai's wealth. Rasukutty falls for Rukmani's beauty after seeing her photograph in a studio. To find out who she is, Sembuli places an advertisement by the name of Soona Baana, to whom he owes money, in the newspaper, claiming she has gone missing. Rukmani, an agriculture graduate, is outraged by the newspaper advertisement and confronts Soona Baana. Chinnapannai orders the villagers to rescue Soona Baana from Rukmani.

Soona Baana tries to take Rukmani hostage, but Rasukutty, disguised as a North Indian, fights off Soona Baana's men and saves her. Rasukutty and Sembuli accompany Rukmani back to her village. When Rukmani discovers they were responsible for the newspaper advertisement, they escape. Eventually, Rasukutty and Rukmani get engaged. However, Rukmani learns that Rasukutty is illiterate, leading to a confrontation between Rukmani and Rasukutty's mother, Eswari. Rukmani tears up the wedding invitation, humiliating Periyapannai in front of the villagers. Rasukutty protests in front of Rukmani's house, trying to win her over. Rasukutty gains the villagers' support, but Rukmani hires goons to attack him. Rasukutty fights them off and finally accepts Rasukutty's love.

Periyapannai refuses to accept Rukmani citing the humiliation, but Rasukutty is determined to marry her, leading to a confrontation. In a fit of anger, Rasukutty's aunt reveals that Rasukutty is an adopted child. This revelation sparks a change in Rasukutty, and he becomes more responsible, starting to work on their land. Although Rasukutty learns that Rukmani loves him, fearing his father's wrath, he agrees to marry the woman his father has chosen, Poovatha, who turns out to be mentally challenged. Rukmani pleads with Periyapannai to allow Rasukutty to marry her, but he refuses. Rukmani with the help of the police, stops the marriage by falsely accusing Periyapannai of demanding dowry. Periyapannai sees this as another humiliation and blames Rasukutty for plotting to stop the marriage. Enraged, he kicks Rasukutty out of the house. Rasukutty's mother, Eswari, leaves with him.

Rukmani threatens to take her own life and demands that Eswari confirm her acceptance as Rasukutty's wife. Meanwhile, Chinnapannai and his son Sengodan manipulate Periyapannai and Eswari, creating a rift between them. Chinnapannai and Sengodan poison Poovatha and arrange for her to marry Ammavasai, Chinnapannai's younger son. They deceive Periyapannai into promising to adopt Ammavasai as his son, ensuring they gain a share of the property. Rasukutty emotionally manipulates Periyapannai, making him believe that Eswari and Rasukutty are leaving town. This reunites Periyapannai and Eswari emotionally.

Chinnapannai and Sengodan falsely accuse Rasukutty of planning to kill Periyapannai and Ammavasai for their wealth, leading to Rasukutty's arrest. Using this as an opportunity, Sengodan and Chinnapannai attempt to murder Periyapannai and Eswari but Ammavasai bravely fights his father and brother to protect his uncle Periyapannai and aunt Eswari. Rasukutty escapes from police custody and saves his parents from Chinnapannai's goons. The film concludes with Rukmani apologising to Periyapannai, Rasukutty welcoming Ammavasai as his adopted brother, and Ammavasai preparing to marry Poovatha.

== Cast ==
- Bhagyaraj as Rasukutty
- Aishwarya as Rukmani
- Manorama as Eswari, Rasukutty's mother
- Kalyan Kumar as Periyapannai, Rasukutty's father
- Jagan as Sembuli, Rasukutty's sidekick
- Mounika as Poovaatha, Rasukutty's cousin
- Nalinikanth as Chinnapannai, Rasukutty's paternal uncle
- Suryakanth as Sengodan, Chinnapannai's elder son
- Junior Balaiah as Subramani Chettiyar "Soona Baana"
- Bayilvan Ranganathan as Poovatha's father
- Nandhagopal as Ammavasai, Chinnapannai's younger son
- Sivaraman as a villager
- Kovai Senthil as a postman
- Tirupur Ramasamy as a village healer

== Production ==
K. Bhagyaraj agreed to do a film for Panchu Arunachalam which eventually became Rasukutty. The film saw Bhagyaraj and Ilaiyaraaja reuniting after a brief misunderstanding. The film was completely shot at Mettur.

== Soundtrack ==
The music was composed by Ilaiyaraaja.

Song	Singers	Lyrics	Length
"Adi Naan Pudicha"	S. P. Balasubrahmanyam	Panchu Arunachalam	04:55
"Holi Holi"	S. P. Balasubrahmanyam, S. Janaki	Vaali	05:35
"Palayathu Ponnu"	K. S. Chithra, Sundarrajan, Saibaba	Vaali	05:59
"Vaadi En Sengamalam"	Minmini	Vaali	04:09

== Release and reception ==
Rasukutty was released on 25 October 1992, Diwali day. Ayyappa Prasad of The Indian Express wrote the film "has a very interesting storyline with Bhagyaraj giving a very good performance". K. Vijiyan of New Straits Times wrote, "We see the old Bhagiaraj we used to love in Rasukutti". C. R. K. of Kalki wrote that the humorous dialogues and fast paced screenplay prove the brand of Bhagyaraj but the sudden twists towards the end were exaggerated.

== Legacy ==
Jagan, who portrayed a character named Sembuli, acquired the sobriquet "Sembuli Jagan" after acting in this film.
