= Poi Satchi =

1982 Indian Tamil film

- Poster
- Directed by: G. Ramakrishnan; K. Bhagyaraj
- Screenplay by: K. Bhagyaraj
- Produced by: S. N. S. Thirumal
- Starring: K. Bhagyaraj; Radhika; Sumithra
- Music by: Shankar–Ganesh
- Production company: Thirupathysamy Pictures
- Release date: 3 September 1982
- Running time: 131 minutes
- Country: India
- Language: Tamil

Poi Satchi (transl. False witness) is a 1982 Tamil-language film directed by G. Ramakrishnan and K. Bhagyaraj, starring Bhagyaraj, Radhika and Sumithra. It was released on 3 September 1982. The film failed at the box office.

== Plot ==
Vairavan ekes out a living in Madras by committing perjury and petty crimes. One night, he encounters a teenage girl searching for her brother, reminding him of his sister, Sornam. Fifteen years ago, in the village of Kuniyamuthur, Sornam, an adolescent girl, and her younger brother Vairavan attempted to escape from a village pervert who was harassing her. During the chaos, Vairavan got separated from his sister as the river flood swept away during his early adolescence.

At present, Vairavan meets Munusamy, a limping traditional healer from his village, who informs him that his sister is alive in Nellithurai village. Due to the recent floods, their land had been washed away, and Sornam now lives in poverty with her adolescent daughter and two children. To visit and arrange for his niece's marriage, Vairavan agrees to appear as a false witness, a task he had previously rejected. However, he ends up testifying against Sornam's husband, Murugappan, an innocent man, who is now convicted of murder charges and jailed due to Vairavan's perjury.

Vairavan visits Nellithurai, but his late arrival forces him to stay overnight and cross the river the next morning. The following day, he overhears a conversation between Sornam and Murugappan's lawyer, realizing he is responsible for sending his brother-in-law to prison falsely. Overcome with guilt, Vairavan throws away all the money he received for his perjury into the Sanikulam, an atonement pond where people seek forgiveness for their sins. The house owner, aware of Murugappan's imprisonment, evicts Sornam and her family from his house. Singaram, a wealthy landlord and widower, offers to help Sornam but expects sexual favors in return. To maintain her self-respect, Sornam seeks refuge under a Sacred Fig tree near the riverbank, where Vairavan is also accommodating.

The next day, Vairavan introduces himself to Sornam as an orphan and offers to support her and her family. Unable to find a job in the village, he starts stealing from the devotees' offerings at the Sanikulam, where he befriends Rukku and eventually falls in love. However, when Sornam discovers Vairavan's theft, she confronts him tearfully, refusing to accept the tainted money. Vairavan seeks forgiveness and begins working at a smithy, but it doesn't last long. With the meager income and Rukku's guidance, they start a cottage unit to manufacture savory snacks, which Vairavan markets on his bicycle. Eventually, they improve their situation, and Vairavan even arranges a groom for his niece Mangalam.

Murugappan, delighted by the developments, obtains an interim bail to attend his daughter's wedding. However, Vairavan, unable to face Murugappan and fearing humiliation before Sornam, plans to leave with Rukku before Murugappan arrives. During the marriage procession, a relative who had previously asked Sornam to marry her daughter to him as his second wife attacks the groom and disrupts the ceremony. Vairavan, the groom, and the villagers unite to thwart the attack. Before reaching the house, Murugappan spots Vairavan and brutally attacks him. Sornam sees Rukku secretly leaving the marriage and stops to question her. Rukku reveals the truth: Vairavan is Sornam's brother and responsible for Murugappan's imprisonment.

During the fight, Murugappan has a seizure, but the heavily beaten Vairavan saves him by using a Vel. Sornam arrives to find her long-lost brother, Vairavan, lying in blood. Murugappan regrets that Vairavan's only mistake was committing perjury, but he had helped and protected the family significantly. Vairavan recovers from his injuries, and Murugappan returns to prison, leaving his family with Vairavan.

== Cast ==
- K. Bhagyaraj as Vairavan
- Radhika as Rukku
- Sumithra as Sornam, Vairavan's sister
- Kovai Sarala as Young Sornam
- Senthil as Pandaram
- Peeli Sivam as Murugappan, Sornam's husband
- Pasi Narayanan as Munusamy
- Anuradha
- Kallapetti Singaram as Singaram
- Master Haja Sheriff as Sornam's son

== Production ==
The film was primarily directed by G. Ramakrishnan, although Bhagyaraj also directed some scenes. Despite this, the producer wanted to credit Bhagyaraj as the sole director due to his popularity, which Bhagyaraj refused to accept. As a result, both Ramakrishnan and Bhagyaraj were left uncredited as directors.

== Soundtrack ==
The music was composed by Shankar–Ganesh and lyrics by Vaali.

Title	Singer(s)	Duration
"Yarru Pathathillai"	Malaysia Vasudevan	4:08
"Thathai Thavum"	S. Janaki	3:47
"Atho Antha Thendral"	Malaysia Vasudevan, Vani Jayaram	4:46
"Machan Nee Aarumugam"	S. P. Sailaja	4;16

== Reception ==
Thiraignani of Kalki wrote a review in the form of a conversation between Bhagyaraj and lawyer.
