= Oru Oorla Oru Rajakumari =

- Poster
- Directed by: K. Bhagyaraj
- Written by: K. Bhagyaraj
- Produced by: C. H. Venu
- Starring: K. Bhagyaraj; Meena
- Cinematography: A. Karthik Raja
- Edited by: S. M. V. Subbu
- Music by: Ilaiyaraaja
- Production company: Indrani Movies
- Distributed by: Albert Release
- Release date: 15 January 1995
- Country: India
- Language: Tamil

Oru Oorla Oru Rajakumari (transl. In a Certain Town, a Young Princess) is a 1995 Indian Tamil-language romantic comedy film written and directed by K. Bhagyaraj who stars alongside Meena. The film was released on 15 January 1995. The film was inspired by the Hollywood film Roman Holiday (1953).

== Plot ==
Venkata Subramaniam "Venkat", is an educated but unemployed bachelor living with his brothers' family. Despite his qualifications, he's unable to find a job, and his brothers and their wives frequently belittle him, assigning him menial and demeaning tasks. Venkat endures the humiliation, but his brothers' family continues to mock him. The one person who shows him love and kindness is his grandmother, who dreams of a bright future for her grandson, including marrying a princess.

Lakshmi Prabha, the owner of Neelagiri Estate and a member of a royal lineage, is set to get married. However, her engagement is disrupted when her father, King Vijayaraghavan receives a phone call about a supposed financial downfall, leading to a mass exodus of relatives. Unbeknownst to them, the call is a mistake, and their finances are secure. Tragically, Vijayaraghavan dies of a heart attack, and she's left devastated by his passing and her relatives' opportunistic behavior. Determined to marry for love rather than royal status, Prabha decides to take a break at her friend's house, which happens to be next to Venkat's residence. She observes Venkat's life, noting his kindness and helpful nature despite his struggles. Prabha offers Venkat a job as the manager of her estate without revealing her true identity. At the estate, Venkat meets Ekambaraeshwarar, an accountant posing as the king following Prabha's plan. Prabha introduces herself as Lakshmi, a servant maid, and Venkat remains oblivious to her royal status.

Venkat is on a quest to find his ideal bride, believing his grandmother's dream that he'll marry a princess. Prabha loves him but keeps her identity hidden, wanting him to fall for her, not her wealth and royal status. Venkat's grandmother visits Neelagiri Estate and is impressed by Lakshmi's kindness. She encourages Venkat to consider Lakshmi as a potential bride, but he's uninterested, still searching for a princess. Lakshmi is disappointed by Venkat's materialistic approach but remains hopeful. When Venkat arranges a marriage for Lakshmi without her consent, the prospective groom's true nature is revealed, and he begins to stalk her. Meanwhile, Venkat's plans to marry a princess fall through due to her questionable background. Venkat finally sees Lakshmi in a new light, realizing her character and love for him. He decides to marry her, wanting to surprise her with the wedding invitation. However, Lakshmi assumes he's marrying another princess and, heartbroken gives him a precious royal stone. Unaware of the stone's significance, Venkat takes it to a temple, leading to his arrest for stealing royal property. It's then revealed that Lakshmi is Princess Lakshmi Prabha.

Venkat resigns and leaves, but his grandmother urges him to express his love, now that he knows Lakshmi's true identity. However, Prabha requests that Venkat's love remain unspoken, as she wants someone who loves her for who she is, not her royal status. She's unwilling to accept his love after he's discovered her true identity. The groom, feigning concern for Venkat and Prabha, promises to bring them together. Venkat shows his grandmother the wedding invitation, proving that he loved Prabha for who she is, not her royal background. In the ensuing chaos, Prabha finds the invitation and realizes Venkat's true feelings. Overjoyed, she accepts his love, and the two finally unite.

== Cast ==
- K. Bhagyaraj as Venkatasubramaniam "Venkat"
- Meena as Princess Lakshmi Prabha/ Maid Lakshmi
- Vijayakumar as King Vijayaraghavan
- Janagaraj as Accountant Ekambaraeshwarar
- Nirmalamma as Venkat's grandmother
- C. R. Saraswathi as Venkat's sister-in-law
- Surabhi
- Livingston as an avaricious groom
- Charle as Madasamy, a rickshaw driver
- Kumarimuthu as Nair, a cook
- Nalinikanth as Venkat's elder brother
- Mannangatti Subramaniam as the groom's fake father
- Sembuli Jagan as Pichai Periyannan, a beggar

== Production ==
Bhagyaraj offered the role of a drunkard to Charle, feeling only he could pull if off properly. The film was entirely shot at Lalitha Mahal, Mysore.

== Soundtrack ==
The music was composed by Ilaiyaraaja, with lyrics by Vaali.

Song	Singers	Length
"Azhagu Nila"	Mano	5:20
"Oru Maina Kunju"	Mano, S. Janaki	5:03
"Ethanai Naala"	Mano, Uma Ramanan	4:59
"Kanmani Kaadhal"	Mano, Swarnalatha	5:03
"Vandhal Vandhal"	Mano, Arunmozhi, Devie Neithiyar	5:29
"Raja Rajathan"	S. Janaki, Arunmozhi, S. N. Surendar	5:49

== Critical reception ==
K. Vijiyan of New Straits Times wrote, "[Oru Oorla Oru Rajakumari] would have been an impossible fairytale for any other director to carry off. [Bhagyaraj] makes it just a little more believable". R.P.R. of Kalki called the climax and music the film's biggest strengths.
