= Malgudi Subha =

Indian playback singer

- Born: Subhashini
- Genres: Playback singer, pop singer
- Occupation: Singer
- Instrument: Vocalist

Malgudi Subha (also spelled as Malgadi Shuba) is an Indian playback singer. She has recorded songs in Kannada, Tamil, Telugu, Malayalam and Hindi. In a career spanning two decades, she has sung more than 3000 songs.

She began her career by providing vocals for ad jingles composed by people like A. R. Rahman and Viji Manuel. She debuted as a playback singer in the film Nadodi Thendral, with music by Ilayaraja. Prominent Indian composer A. R. Rahman's debut album, Set Me Free (also called Shubhaa Set Me Free), had all its songs sung by Shubha. The album, which was released in 1989 and went unnoticed, but became a good seller when it was re-released in 1996 by the label Magnasound. She sang the song "Thayya Thayya" (Tamil version of "Chaiyya Chaiyya") in the 1998 Mani Ratnam film Uyire (Tamil dub of Dil Se..), which was composed by A. R. Rahman. Even the Telugu version of the same song from the film Prematho had her vocals alongside Sapna Awasthi's voice from the original

Her first successful Telugu album, Chikpak Chikbhum, which was released in Chennai, sold ten lakh copies. The songs were composed by Raj–Koti, under whom A. R. Rahman was assisted.

She has appeared as a judge on the Malayalam language music competition program Idea Star Singer. She is a judge in Star Singer 2 (Kannada), airing on Asianet Suvarna from 7-8 pm on weekdays. She is also a judge in the Tamil music competition program Super Singer in Star Vijay.

The South Indian actress Priyamani is her niece, and Hindi actress Vidya Balan is her relative.

== Television ==
Year	Television show	Role	Network
2024	Super Singer Season 10	Guest	Star Vijay

== Discography ==
=== Tamil ===
Year	Film	Song(s)	Composer	Notes
1992	Nadodi Thendral	All The Time	Ilayaraja	
1992	Kottai Vaasal	Vaaya En	Deva	
1994	Veetla Visheshanga	Indha Bus than	Ilayaraja	
1994	Captain	Iduppu Adikkadi, Unakku Oru Macham	Sirpy	
1994	Chinna Madam	Kora Kizhangukku	Sirpy	
1994	Jaihind	Oothathuma	Vidyasagar	
1995	Bombay	Poovukenna Poottu	A. R. Rahman	
1995	Valli Vara Pora	Rootula Jootula, Theendamal	K. S. Manioli	
1996	Musthaffaa	Kalapu Mayile	Vidyasagar	
1996	Gnanapazham	Marina Beach	K. Bhagyaraj	
1996	Krishna	Dhak Dhak	S. A. Rajkumar	
1997	Minsara Kanavu	Thanga Thamarai	A. R. Rahman	
1997	Kalyana Vaibhogam	Hollywood Chance	Deva	
1997	Raman Abdullah	Machan Un Machini	Ilayaraja	
1997	Love Today	Salamiya	Shiva	
1998	Sivan	Pesarattu, Rukkuthan	Adithyan	
1998	Uyire	Thaiyya Thaiyya	A. R. Rahman	
1998	Sundara Pandian	Malgudi	Deva	
2001	Nandhaa	Mun Paniya	Yuvan Shankar Raja	
2001	Pandavar Bhoomi	Hey Samba	Bharadwaj	
2002	Manasellam	Midnightla	Ilayaraja	
2002	Azhagi	Oru Sundari	Ilayaraja	
2002	Roja Kootam	Subbamma	Bharadwaj	
2002	Mounam Pesiyadhe	Aruvadhu Aayidichu	Yuvan Shankar Raja	
2010	Easan	Sugavaasi	James Vasanthan	

=== Malayalam ===
Year	Film	Song(s)	Composer	Notes
1994	Thenmavin Kombathu	"Nila Pongal"	Berny-Ignatius	"Nila Pongal" is accused of being an imitation of a Bengali song, "Sun Mere Bandhu Re".
1995	Mannar Mathai Speaking	"Machane Vaa"	S. P. Venkatesh	
1997	Chandralekha	"Maanathe Chandiranothoru"	S. P. Venkatesh	
2005	Ben Johnson	"Sona Sona nee"	Deepak Dev	
2015	Charlie	"Akale"	Gopi Sundar	

== Filmography ==
=== As actress ===
- Kishkindha Kanda (1994) - cameo in song "Kokketho Kelithe"
- Kadhai (2010) - cameo appearance
- Achcham Madam Naanam Payirppu (2022)
