= Aararo Aariraro =

- Poster
- Directed by: K. Bhagyaraj
- Written by: K. Bhagyaraj
- Produced by: Poornima Bhagyaraj
- Starring: K. Bhagyaraj; Bhanupriya
- Cinematography: K. Rajpreeth
- Edited by: A. P. Manivannan
- Music by: K. Bhagyaraj
- Production company: Shantanoo Cine Combines
- Release date: 24 November 1989
- Country: India
- Language: Tamil

Aararo Aariraro is a 1989 Indian Tamil-language romantic drama film, written and directed by K. Bhagyaraj, starring himself and Bhanupriya. It was released on 27 November 1989. Bhanupriya won the Tamil Nadu State Film Award Special Prize, Filmfare Award for Best Actress – Tamil and the Cinema Express Award for Best Actress – Tamil. The film was remade in Kannada as Thooguve Krishnana (1994).

== Plot ==
Babu is a caretaker in a mental hospital who shows much devotion to his job and more affection towards the patients in the hospital. He wears the patients' dress and moves like one among them. Due to this, the chief doctor, also a priest Father, likes him much more than others, fetching Babu the enmity of two compounders in the hospital. One of the financial donors of the hospital brings a wandering girl to the hospital, suspecting that she is mentally ill. Since nobody knows anything about her and she is mentally challenged, the hospital admits her. Babu moves with the girl like he moves with all other patients, but shows more affection than others as she does not have anybody to take care of her. The employees watch with curiosity and spin stories on them. Babu names the girl Meenakshi and calls her Meenu.

One of the two compounders talks to a mentally challenged girl who is always craving for a baby, and tells her that he will give her a baby, indirectly trying to rape her. Meenu sees this and makes snake alert to stop it, which fetches everybody. This angers the compounder and he gives electric shock. Babu rescues Meenu and complains to Father, resulting in the suspension of the compounder and his friend. Babu now takes more care of her and spends more time with her. When Meenu was about to be sent off from the hospital she faints and doctors confirm her pregnancy. Everybody points out Babu as the reason, the Father also believes them and compels Babu to marry her. Babu admits he is the reason for her pregnancy and marries her. Babu's mother is very much angered by this and she shouts that her son is surely not of such a character and everybody has cheated her son. One day Father sees Meenu kneeling down near the confession box and sits to listen to her. Meenu reveals that she is not a mental patient and Babu is not the reason for her pregnancy.

Meenu was a very rich orphan. She had a cousin who is of very bad character with all sorts of bad habits. He insists Meenu to marry him by pretending that he loves her more than his life. The aunt plots a plan to marry off her son to Meenu so that her property shall be inherited by her son, but Meenu refuses his proposal. She mixes sleeping pills in Meenu's milk and Meenu goes into a deep sleep. As per the plan, Meenu is raped by her cousin. When she awakes without clothes and knows the truth, she kills her aunt and escapes from her home and her cousin. She kept quiet when Babu was blamed, because she wanted to escape from her cousin by marrying a gentle man like Babu. Father is shocked to hear this and rushes to reveal the truth to everyone. But Meenu stops him that it is unethical as per Christian norms to reveal the truth heard in the confession box, which is supposed to be confidential. She also implies as per the will, all her property belongs to her child and after her child is born, she would hand over the will and child to Babu and go away from him. Father understands the meaning of the decision and tries to stop her in all means.

Meenu continues to act as a mental case to everyone. Babu's mother takes Meenu with her and lives in the staff quarters house of Babu inside the hospital. Meanwhile, Meenu's cousin succeeds in his search for Meenu and he comes to meet her, but Meenu hides from him. Finally Meenu is admitted in the hospital for the childbirth. She reveals the truth to Babu as she fears she might not return after the caesarian. Meenu gives birth to a boy safely. Her cousin chases her to take Meenu and his child along with him and reveals that he is the father of the child and Meenu is an accused for a murder to Babu's mother. But Meenu explains the evil thing which he did for Meenu to her mother-in-law. This makes Babu's mother understand Meenu's position and she supports her. Meenu's cousin deliberately takes Meenu and the child with him and Babu stops him. Babu explains that he cannot claim the child as his, as Meenu will be against him and also Meenu cannot be accused for murder since he himself closed the file as an accident. After a lot of struggle, the cousin is shot to dead by one of the mental patients. Meenu unites with Babu and his mother along with her child. They move back to Meenu's own place to a life of riches.

== Cast ==
- K. Bhagyaraj as Babu
- Bhanupriya as Meenu
- Manorama as Babu's mother
- Jai Ganesh as Father, the mental hospital chief
- Kula Deivam V. R. Rajagopal as Captain Soriyappa, a patient
- V. R. Thilakam as Meenu's aunt
- Kokila Gobinathan as a baby-craving patient
- Dr. S. Sankaran
- C. R. Saraswathi as a physician
- Mannagatti Subramaniam as a patient
- Tirupur Ramasamy as a patient
- Sembuli Jagan as a patient
- Kovai Senthil as a patient

== Soundtrack ==
The music was composed by K. Bhagyaraj, with lyrics written by Vaali and Vairamuthu. For the dubbed Telugu version Chilipi Pellam, all lyrics were written by Rajasri.

Tamil track listing
No.	Title	Lyrics	Singer(s)	Length
1.	"Ellorume Loosungathaan"	Vairamuthu	K. Bhagyaraj and chorus	3:43
2.	"En Kannukkoru Nilavaa"	Vaali	S. P. Balasubrahmanyam, S. Janaki and chorus	4:29
3.	"Enna Figure"	Vaali	S. P. Balasubrahmanyam and chorus	4:16
4.	"Odappakkam Oru Kuruvi"	Vaali	S. P. Balasubrahmanyam and K. S. Chithra	4:18
5.	"Oru Moonam Pirai"	Vaali	S. P. Balasubrahmanyam and Vani Jairam	4:24
6.	"Thaana Thalaiyaadunda"	Vaali	S. Janaki and chorus	5:16

Telugu track listing
No.	Title	Singer(s)	Length
1.	"Chilipiga Gorinka"	Mano, K. S. Chithra	4:24
2.	"Emi Figure"	Mano	4:23
3.	"Neekantikoka Velugai"	Mano, S. Janaki	4:36
4.	"Ea Lokame Pichollura"	Mano, S. Janaki	4:10
5.	"Thalale Vestarule"	S. Janaki	5:25
Total length:			23:00

== Reception ==
P. S. S. of Kalki wrote it is a different story, adding that the suspense of the film was preserved perfectly, and the screenplay uninterrupted. Bhanupriya won the Tamil Nadu State Film Award Special Prize, the Filmfare Award for Best Actress – Tamil, and the Cinema Express Award for Best Actress – Tamil.
