= Rudhra =

- Poster
- Directed by: Sasi Mohan
- Screenplay by: K. Bhagyaraj
- Story by: Ilavarasan
- Produced by: V. Viswanthan
- Starring: K. Bhagyaraj; Gautami; Lakshmi; Mansoor Ali Khan
- Cinematography: V. Ramesh Babu
- Edited by: M. V. Natarajan
- Music by: Gangai Amaran
- Production company: Sree Rajeswari Creations
- Release date: 5 November 1991
- Country: India
- Language: Tamil

Rudhra is a 1991 Indian Tamil-language action thriller film directed by Sasi Mohan. It stars K. Bhagyaraj, Gautami, Lakshmi and Mansoor Ali Khan. The film was one among the Diwali releases of 1991. The bank robbery scenes of the film were inspired by that of the American film Quick Change (1990). The core plot was inspired by the French film Nikita.

== Plot ==
Mayaandi, a notorious convict, orchestrates a daring escape from prison with the aid of the prison staff to brutally murder Rudhra's entire family, leaving her orphaned. A neighbor informs Rudhra that she witnessed the perpetrators fleeing the scene and identifies one of them as Mayaandi. Rudhra soon realizes that her father, Gopal, a police officer, was instrumental in Mayaandi's current imprisonment. Rudhra reports the crime to the police, but they are unable to take action against Mayaandi, as he had returned to prison after the murder, thereby establishing an alibi. Rudhra receives a letter from her late father, in which he reveals his investigation into Mayaandi's connections with corrupt police officers and politicians. She discovers a video cassette containing incriminating evidence and hands it over to the DSP, only to discover that he is complicit in the conspiracy. The DSP attacks Rudhra, intending to molest her, but she kills him in self-defense.

Although the court establishes her guilt, Rudhra refuses to divulge the reason behind her actions. Consequently, she is sent for inquiry under the supervision of DSP Lalitha, an honest and incorruptible officer. The conspirators, realizing that the video cassette they seized from Rudhra was not the incriminating one, continue to pursue her, but Lalitha rescues her after receiving an anonymous tip. Rudhra shares her story with Lalitha, who is unaware of the original cassette's location. The next day, while being transported to court, Rudhra escapes from the police. With no other option, DSP Lalitha is forced to encounter-kill Rudhra. It is then revealed that Lalitha had allied with Rudhra and had staged the fake encounter to protect Rudhra from the world. Since, the police department is unsafe, Lalitha disguises Rudhra as a boy and entrusts her to Madurai, a thief with a reputation for intelligence. Lalitha briefs Rudhra on Madurai's exceptional abilities, citing a daring bank robbery he committed in broad daylight, evading the police with ease. Interestingly, Madurai utilizes the stolen funds to support orphaned and disabled children, as well as underprivileged individuals in need of medical care.

Rudhra develops strong feelings for Madurai. Although Madurai is initially hesitant, he eventually agrees to assist Lalitha in unraveling the conspiracy. Madurai soon discovers Rudhra's true identity. Meanwhile, the corrupt officials remain skeptical about Rudhra's death and dispatch their men to tail Lalitha and Madurai's timely intervention rescues them from harm. After hearing the full story, Madurai devises a plan to bring the conspirators to justice. So, he randomly contacts police officers, inquiring about Mayaandi. He shortlists DCP Sundararajan and ACP Mohan as the perpetrators involved in Rudhra's family's murder. Although unaware of the cassette's existence, Madurai lures Sundararajan and Mohan by claiming to possess the video cassette they were searching for, offering to exchange it for money. He skillfully manipulates Sundararajan and Mohan into confessing their crimes with Mayaandi, which he secretly video records as evidence. He uses this recording to threaten them. However, Mayaandi reveals that he possesses the video cassette, exposing Madurai's ruse. Mayaandi now captures Madurai, Lalitha, and Rudhra. To escape, Madurai creates a diversion, claiming that the video cassette has a duplicate copy stored in a bank locker belonging to a central minister. This clever ploy leads to the arrest of Sundararajan and Mohan.

Madurai, Lalitha, and Rudhra engage in a fierce hand-to-hand combat with Maayandi and his henchmen. Ultimately, Madurai fatally shoots Maayandi, cleverly staging the scene to make it appear as though Lalitha had fired the shot in self-defense, retaliating against Maayandi's attempt to shoot her. Before the police arrive to intervene, Madurai and Rudhra make a swift escape.

== Cast ==
- K. Bhagyaraj as Madurai
- Gautami as Rudhra
- Lakshmi as DSP Lalitha
- Mansoor Ali Khan as Maayandi
- Senthamarai as a corrupt DSP
- Delhi Ganesh as DCP Sundararajan
- Nalinikanth as ACP Mohan
- T. S. Raghavendar as Gopal, Rudhra's father
- Typist Gopu as a bank Senior Manager
- Kamala Kamesh as Rudhra's neighbour
- Major Sundarrajan as a judge (guest appearance)

== Soundtrack ==
The music was composed by Gangai Amaran. The lyrics were written by Vaali and Amaran.

Track listing
No.	Title	Singer(s)	Length
1.	"Vittu Vittu"	S. P. Balasubrahmanyam, K. S. Chithra	5:18
2.	"Enrootu"	S. P. Balasubrahmanyam	5:02
3.	"Aadadu"	K. S. Chithra	4:48
Total length:			15:08

== Reception ==
The Indian Express wrote the film "beguiles you [..] with its quickpaced narration". Sundarji of Kalki wrote the film, despite having so many opportunities for providing thrills and twists, squandered them. The film ran for over 100 days in theatres, and Gautami won the Film Fans Association Award for Best Actress.

== Legacy ==
Sasi Mohan later directed Sivantha Malar, also inspired from Nikita and again starring Gautami.
