= Junior Super Stars season 2 =

Junior Super Stars
- Season 2
- No. of episodes: 40+1 (Special Episode)

Release
- Original network: Zee Tamil
- Original release: 13 May – 24 September 2017

Junior Super Stars (season 2) is a 2017 Tamil talent-search reality show, which aired on Zee Tamil on every Saturday and Sunday from 13 May 2017 to 24 September 2017 at 19:00 (IST) for 40 Episodes. It is a second season of the show Junior Super Star. which has children between the ages of 5–14 years as the participants. The judges are Actor and director K. Bhagyaraj, actress Roja and Anchor Archana. The season winner is Bhavass.

== Winners ==
The second season grand finale episode of the Junior super star show will be held at the city Coimbatore, in Tamil Nadu. The Tamil comedy actor Santhanam will be the chief guest with Zee Tamil Family of the final round show.

Winners	Notes
Bhavass	Winners
Nithyasri and Karmugil	Runner-up
Niharika	Second Runner-up

== Cast ==
Hosted

- Keerthi: who had appeared Tamil television reality shows host like Maanada Mayilada (Season:01-10) and Junior Super Star.

Judges

- K. Bhagyaraj: is an Indian director, actor, screenwriter and producer active mainly in Tamil films.
- Roja: is a South Indian actress.
- Archana

== Competitors ==
The show have 20 contestants vying with each other for the title.

- Aasmi
- Adithya
- Ajay
- Akshayaa
- Andrieya
- Anushka
- Bhavass
- Bhuvanika
- Hajeera
- Harishini
- Karmukil Vannan
- Lingwswaran
- Manisha
- Migamed Nafil
- Niharika
- ithya Sree
- Rithanya
- Roshan Krishna
- Saiharish
- Santhosh
- Varun
- Vishwa

== Audition ==
The audition Audition Date is on 26 March 2017.

- Coimbatore
- Madurai
- Trichy
- Chennai
- Salem
- Tirunelveli
- Tiruppur
