= Vidiyum Varai Kaathiru =

1981 film by K. Bhagyaraj

- Theatrical release poster
- Directed by: K. Bhagyaraj
- Written by: Thooyavan (dialogues)
- Screenplay by: K. Bhagyaraj
- Story by: K. Bhagyaraj
- Produced by: S. Sakthivel; M. S. Akbar
- Starring: K. Bhagyaraj; Sathyakala; Karate Mani
- Cinematography: A. V. Ramakrishnan
- Edited by: A. Selvanathan
- Music by: Ilaiyaraaja
- Production company: S. T. Combines
- Release date: 8 May 1981
- Running time: 133 minutes
- Country: India
- Language: Tamil

Vidiyum Varai Kaathiru (transl. Wait until dawn) is a 1981 Indian Tamil-language thriller film, written and directed by K. Bhagyaraj. The film, starring himself and Sathyakala, was released on 8 May 1981. It was remade in Malayalam as Sharam (1982) and in Hindi as Pathar Ke Insan (1990).

== Plot ==
Raja arrives in Ooty, seeking employment. He encounters Rajasekhar, a wealthy businessman, and inadvertently trespasses on his property multiple times. During one of these visits, Raja hears a woman's distressing screams but receives no response. Rajasekhar notices Raja's cleverness and soon finds himself kidnapped by thugs seeking money. Raja saves Rajasekhar by fighting off the kidnappers. In gratitude, Rajasekhar offers Raja money, but Raja declines, instead requesting a job. Rajasekhar agrees and invites Raja to stay at his house. That night, Raja hears the same screams, which unsettle him. The next morning, he asks Rajasekhar to let him leave. However, Rajasekhar introduces Raja to his mentally ill daughter, Sathya, who is the source of the screams.

Rajasekhar shares Sathya's tragic past: she and her sister Kala were talented artists who got into an argument about who was superior. Kala's sensitivity led her to take her own life after losing a challenge to Sathya. Sathya's guilt and trauma transformed her into a mentally ill patient. After hearing the tale, Raja begins to look after Sathya and treat her condition. Raja attempts several amusing ways to "treat" Sathya's condition. Sathya is happier than ever and is still recovering steadily. Raja forces her into a lake as part of her treatment, but he also saves her. Raja accuses Sathya of attempting to kill him by hurting himself one evening. Rajasekhar takes Raja to the doctor, and following his care, the doctor encourages Rajasekhar to marry Sathya to a reliable man, stating that sex is a way to heal her mental ailment. Rajasekhar pleads with Raja to marry his daughter, since he thinks he is the ideal suitor for Sathya, offering his properties to him, which are registered in Sathya's name, and making arrangements for their union.

It is then revealed that Raja had entered the house, appeared to be innocent, and gained Rajasekhar's trust to plunder his entire estate. Raja is exposed as a seasoned criminal, and he along with Ramya, another criminal in the gang, who loves Raja has planned to usurp Rajasekhar's property. It is also revealed that Raja had arranged for the kidnap earlier and the doctor to provide the plan for Sathya's marriage. When Sethupathy, Raja's brother-in-law, visits Rajasekhar, he is first taken aback to meet Raja, with whom Sethupathy had previously been defrauded in a gambling match. Sethupathy sides with Raja seeking a portion of the property since he knows that Raja has just married to grab Rajasekhar's properties. Raja unwillingly complies with Ramya's advice, failing which Sethupathy will expose Raja's actual character to Rajasekhar. Sethupathy witnesses Raja's initial attempt to murder Sathya, in which he pushes her off a cliff like Kala's death to claim it was a suicide.

Sathya, however, is saved by some woodland inhabitants and returns alive after a few days. Additionally, Sathya's mental disorder is cured and she becomes a sane woman as a result of the shock. Sathya receives an explanation from Rajasekhar on her marriage to Raja. Ramya yells at Raja for failing to murder Sathya when she is suffering from mental illness. Raja feigns to look after Sathya and takes her to Coonoor for their honeymoon, where Raja lights the LPG cylinders, causing Sathya to perish in the flames. However, when the servant arrives in the kitchen before Sathya, this plot falls through. Inspector Shankar believes Raja is responsible for the "fire accident."

Raja then devises a third scheme by shooting Sathya from a distance through the window. After telling the police, Raja intends to take the train from Ooty to Mettupalayam to avoid raising Shankar's suspicions. To avoid being discovered, Raja intends to disembark from the train in the middle, drive back home in Sethupathy's vehicle, shoot Sathya, and then quickly join the train again at Wellington Station. All the plans work out, but he shoots the housemaid by mistake believing it to be Sathya's shadow. After the murder, the police look into the crime and Shankar immediately pursues the train to find out if Raja is inside. Sethupathy's car breaks down failing Raja's plan and Ramya is also unable to assist Raja when he asks for another car. Raja shoots the tires on the police jeep and pauses the train by claiming that a bomb has been hidden in the railroad track to prevent Shankar from continuing towards Wellington. Raja dashes into the train just as Shankar gets on it.

Shankar concludes that Raja is the culprit after speaking with Rajasekhar and Sathya, but Rajasekhar refuses to believe Shankar. However, Sathya understands that Raja attempted to kill her, and since she is pregnant too, she gives Raja the ownership of her property so that he will not have to kill anyone and go to jail. Raja regrets feeling like he failed, and departs without receiving the property. Raja discovers that Ramya had conspired with Sethupathy to defraud him of all his property and so he uses poison laced into the drink to kill one of Sethupathy and Ramya after capturing both of them. However, Sethupathy coerces Ramya into drinking the poison and Shankar apprehends Raja and Sethupathi just as Raja is ready to shoot Sethupathy. A physical altercation breaks out between Shankar, Raja, Sethupathy, and his men, in which Sethupathy is shot by Raja's goon, and Raja holds Shankar at gunpoint and locks him up.

Raja unintentionally shoots Sathya during the standoff, mistaking her for a fellow police officer who has come to Shankar's aid. She pleads with Raja that she desires to live with Raja, and also requests him to turn himself in and not run away from the police. Raja embraces Sathya, signifying his ultimate reformation, after realizing the impact her love has on him.

== Cast ==
- K. Bhagyaraj as Raja
- Sathyakala as Sathya
- Karate Mani as Inspector Shankar
- Suvarna
- Priyavadhana
- Sangili Murugan as Sethupathy
- Gokulnath
- T. S. Seshathri
- Chinna Murugan

== Production ==
The scene where Sathyakala's sister commits suicide by jumping off the cliff was shot at Yercaud Hills.

== Soundtrack ==
The music was composed by Ilaiyaraaja, with lyrics by Vaali.

Song	Singers	Length
"Abhinayam Kaattu"	S. Janaki	4:52
"Neengatha Ennam"	Malaysia Vasudevan, S. Janaki	4:07
"Pesu Ennanbe"	S. P. Balasubrahmanyam, S. P. Sailaja, Sasirekha	4:07

== Reception ==
Sindhu-Jeeva of Kalki praised the music, cinematography, called story as lifeline of the film and the film had brilliance and fast pace needed for a thriller but felt Bhagyaraj was ill-suited for his role. Naagai Dharuman of Anna praised Bhagyaraj's screenplay, acting and direction and other actors, Ilaiyaraaja's music and Thooyavan's dialogues. According to Bhagyaraj, audience could not accept him in a character of a wife murderer after seeing him in a positive character from Mouna Geethangal.
