= Veetlile Visheshanga =

1994 film by K. Bhagyaraj

- Poster
- Directed by: K. Bhagyaraj
- Written by: K. Bhagyaraj
- Produced by: N. Pazhanisamy
- Starring: K. Bhagyaraj; Pragathi
- Cinematography: I. Mohan
- Edited by: S. M. V. Subbu
- Music by: Ilaiyaraaja
- Production company: Bhagyam Cine Combines
- Release date: 14 January 1994
- Country: India
- Language: Tamil

Veetlile Visheshanga (transl. Function at home) is a 1994 Indian Tamil-language comedy drama film, written and directed by K. Bhagyaraj. The film stars Bhagyaraj himself and Pragathi, with Janagaraj, Suresh and Tanikella Bharani in supporting roles. It was released on 14 January 1994, Pongal Day. The film was remade in Hindi by Bhagyaraj himself as Mr. Bechara (1996) and in Kannada as Baanallu Neene Bhuviyallu Neene (2001).

== Plot ==
Gopalakrishnan "Gopal", a widower and single father, admits a woman to the hospital who has suffered a complete loss of memory. As the owner of a local press, Gopal is persuaded by Dr. Shree, the Chief Doctor, to take care of the woman until she recovers from her amnesia. The doctor names the woman Gowri, and to facilitate her recovery, Dr. Shree fabricates a story, telling Gowri that she is married to Gopal and has a child. Gopal is forced to accept this situation and takes Gowri to his home. Gowri insists that she has no recollection of her life. To convince her, Dr. Shree deceives her by mentioning a birthmark on a part of her body known only to her husband. The doctor also places a photograph of Gowri with Gopal's wedding photo. Although Gowri still cannot remember anything, she begins to believe that Gopal is her husband and that she is the mother of his child.

As Gowri starts living with Gopal as his wife, he becomes increasingly troubled, so Dr. Shree informs Gowri that he hated her before the accident. Gopal narrates the story of his marriage to his late wife Gowri. Gowri believes Gopal's narrative and begins to trust him as her husband. She also learns that her parents have died. However, a hospital patient feigns a relationship with Gowri, introducing himself as her father. Gowri sells Gopal's jewels to purchase dresses and plan a vacation trip, causing Gopal significant distress as he had intended to use them to fund a new business venture. During a vacation, Gowri becomes intoxicated, and, irritated by her behavior, Gopal begins to question her identity. Unbeknownst to him, Dr. Shree had previously informed Inspector Sennimalai that Gopal has amnesia, requesting that he not cooperate with Gopal. In the past, Gopal was a rescue worker at sea. His wife, Gowri, suffered a heart attack on a stormy day while he was rescuing Dr. Shree's daughter, Viji. Gopal's delayed response ultimately led to his wife's death. Dr. Shree confesses to his wife that, driven by gratitude, he had orchestrated the amnesia-stricken patient's move into Gopal's house to alleviate Gopal's loneliness and provide care for his toddler child.

The amnesia-stricken Gowri discovers a photograph of Gopal's late wife and confronts him. However, Gopal is unable to provide answers. In a moment of vulnerability, he mistakenly hugs her, thinking she is his deceased wife. Overcome with regret, Gopal demands that Dr. Shree remove Gowri from his house. Gowri overhears the conversation and realizes that Dr. Shree has deceived her. But Dr. Shree explains that he had lied to protect her, seeing her as his daughter. With a change of heart, Gowri expresses her desire to live with Gopal and his child. She proposes to Gopal, but he refuses. Undeterred, Gowri insists that she cannot abandon Gopal or his child. Inspector Sennimalai mistakenly identifies the imposter claiming to be Gowri's father as Gopal's real father-in-law. Following an accident involving Gopal, Gowri takes care of both Gopal and his child. The reformed imposter, who had previously feigned being Gowri's father, provides financial assistance to Gopal and joins their family. Moved by Gowri's unwavering care, Gopal finally accepts her as his wife.

Dr. Shree coincidentally encounters Ganesh, who is revealed to be the love interest of Ganga, the woman who is soon to marry Gopal. During their conversation, Ganesh begins to suspect that Dr. Shree might be aware of Ganga's whereabouts. Fearing that Gopal and Gowri's marriage would be jeopardized, Dr. Shree narrowly escapes from Ganesh. Gopal meets Ganesh, who is searching for Dr. Shree and soon, Gopal discovers Gowri's true identity as Ganga. Gowri, however, is consumed by an unknown fear that something might prevent their marriage. On the day of the wedding, Gowri is shocked to see Ganesh standing as the groom. Ganesh sings a song that restores Gowri's memory, revealing their relationship. In the past, Ganesh and Ganga were about to get married when they were interrupted by goons, causing Ganga to fall from a mountain. Although she survived with injuries, she suffered from amnesia. Gopal insists that Ganga marry Ganesh, as they are truly in love.

Although Ganga reluctantly accepts, she eventually stops Ganesh from tying the Mangalsutra and instead turns to Gopal, expressing her need for him and his child. Ganesh realizes that Ganga's motherly affection has surpassed her love for him, and he selflessly decides to leave Ganga with Gopal. Ultimately, Gopal and Ganga get married.

== Cast ==
- K. Bhagyaraj as Gopalakrishnan "Gopal"
- Pragathi as Ganga/ Gowri
- Mohana as Gowri, Gopal's first wife
- Tanikella Bharani as Inspector Sennimalai
- Janagaraj as Doctor Shree
- Pazhanisamy as Doctor Murthi
- Viji as Gopal's rivalry press owner
- Junior Balaiah as a fellow patient
- Baby Mohan Swarup
- Manjuvani as a rivalry press worker
- Suresh as Ganesh, Ganga's love interest (guest appearance)

== Production ==
Veetla Visheshanga was the title K. Bhagyaraj had chosen for a film; after that project was dropped, he reused the title for a new, unrelated film. It is the debut film of Pragathi, who was chosen after Bhagyaraj saw her in an advertisement for Mysore Silk Palace.

== Soundtrack ==
The soundtrack was composed by Ilaiyaraaja.

Title	Singer(s)	Lyrics
"Indha Busthan"	Malgudi Subha and chorus	Vaali
"Jigan Jinakku"	Swarnalatha	Vaali
"Konjam Sangeetham"	S. Janaki	Vaali
"Malare Thendral"	K. J. Yesudas	Vaali
"Malare Thendral" (Duet)	S. Janaki, Arunmozhi	Vaali
"Poonguyil Rendu"	S. P. Balasubrahmanyam, Sunandha	Pulamaipithan

Telugu version

This film was dubbed into Telugu as Gowramma Nee Mogudevaramma. All lyrics were written by Rajasri.

Title	Singer(s)
"Ee Bassule Subha"	Malgudi Subha
"Gorinka Venta"	S. P. Balasubrahmanyam, K. S. Chithra
"Kosare Sangeetham"	S. Janaki
"Manase Aalapinchu"	S. P. Balasubrahmanyam
"A Gingaa Ginukule"	K. S. Chithra

== Release and reception ==
Veetla Visheshanga was released on 14 January 1994, Pongal day. Malini Mannath of The Indian Express wrote "The director seems to not confident about this script and confused about handling certain scenes. Bhagyaraj is capable of better stuff!" K. Vijiyan of New Straits Times wrote, "This movie is not Bhagiaraj at his best or his funniest". R. P. R. of Kalki felt the film lacked the magic of previous films of Bhagyaraj.
