= Kallapetti Singaram =

Indian actor

- Born: Singaram; 12 June 1938; Karur, Madras Province, British India (now Tamil Nadu, India)
- Died: 15 April 1990 (aged 51)
- Citizenship: Indian
- Occupation: Actor
- Years active: 1966–1990
- Notable work: Suvarilladha Chiththirangal; Andha 7 Naatkal; Mouna Geethangal; Indru Poi Naalai Vaa; Udaya Geetham

Kallapetti Singaram was an Indian actor who worked in over 100 Tamil films from 1966 to 1990. He primarily played comedic characters, mostly in minor roles in films directed by K. Bhagyaraj. His most notable movies include Suvarilladha Chiththirangal, Oru Kai Osai, Andha 7 Naatkal, Mouna Geethangal, Indru Poi Naalai Vaa, and Enga Ooru Pattukaran.

== Early life ==
Kallapetti Singaram owned a successful drama troupe and staged many plays. When Bhagyaraj became acquainted with Singaram he was impressed by his expressive features, acting style, and body language. Later, when Bhagyaraj became a successful director himself, he gave Singaram several opportunities to appear in his films.

== Film career ==
Bhagyaraj first introduced Singaram in Suvarilladha Chiththirangal. At this point, Singaram had already had a minor role in Motor Sundaram Pillai, a movie released in 1966. Even though Singaram only played minor roles in many of Bhagyaraj's films, Bhagyaraj was the only director to give him any significant movie parts.

== Death ==
Kallapetti Singaram died during the filming of his last movie, Kizhakku Vasal, on 15 April 1990 at the age of 52.

== Filmography ==
| Year | Film | Role | Note |
|---|---|---|---|
| 1966 | Motor Sundaram Pillai | Vendor | |
| 1967 | Kaavalkaaran | Patient | |
| 1969 | Athai Magal | | |
| 1970 | Sorgam | | |
| 1973 | Maru Piravi | | |
| 1975 | Eduppar Kaipillai | | |
| 1976 | Kumara Vijayam | | |
| 1979 | Suvarilladha Chiththirangal | Goundar | |
| 1980 | Oru Kai Osai | Tea shop owner | |
| 1980 | Bhama Rukmani | | |
| 1981 | Sattam Oru Iruttarai | | |
| 1981 | Mouna Geethangal | | |
| 1981 | Palaivana Solai | | |
| 1981 | Indru Poi Naalai Vaa | | |
| 1981 | Andha 7 Naatkal | Vasanthi's grandfather | |
| 1981 | Karaiyellam Shenbagapoo | | |
| 1981 | Oruthi Mattam Karaiyinile | | |
| 1982 | Auto Raja | | |
| 1982 | Ayiram Muthangal | | |
| 1982 | Darling, Darling, Darling | Singaram | |
| 1983 | Veetula Raman Veliyila Krishnan | | |
| 1983 | Manaivi Solle Manthiram | | |
| 1984 | Poovilangu | | |
| 1984 | Nilavu Suduvathillai | | |
| 1984 | Simma Soppanam | | |
| 1984 | Nalam Nalamariya Aaval | | |
| 1984 | Osai | | |
| 1984 | My Dear Kuttichathan | Rickshaw driver | |
| 1984 | Kudumbam | | |
| 1985 | Tharaasu | | |
| 1985 | Viswanathan Velai Venum | | |
| 1985 | Kaakki Sattai | | |
| 1985 | Kanni Rasi | | |
| 1985 | Udaya Geetham | | |
| 1985 | Karaiyai Thodatha Alaigal | | |
| 1985 | Saavi | A hotel manager | |
| 1985 | Engal Kural | | |
| 1986 | Piranthaen Valarnthaen | | |
| 1986 | Marumagal | | |
| 1987 | Raja Mariyadhai | | |
| 1987 | Solvathellam Unmai | Munnusamy | |
| 1987 | Makkal En Pakkam | | |
| 1987 | Enga Ooru Pattukaran | Panchayat leader | |
| 1987 | Veerapandiyan | | |
| 1987 | Thangachi | | |
| 1988 | Aval Mella Sirithal | | |
| 1988 | Katha Nayagan | Konar | |
| 1988 | Shenbagamae Shenbagamae | | |
| 1989 | Raasave Unnai Nambi | | |
| 1990 | Periya Veettu Panakkaran | | Posthumously released |
| 1990 | Kizhakku Vaasal | | Posthumously released |
| 1990 | En Kadhal Kanmani | Book store worker | Posthumously released |
| 1995 | Raja Enga Raja | | Posthumously released |
