= Junior Super Stars =

- Genre: Talent show Reality
- Directed by: Praveen G
- Presented by: Keerthi Shanthanu (Season 1,2 & 4); Kamal Dhandapani (Season 3); Anjana Rangan (Season 3)
- Judges: K. Bhagyaraj (Season 1,2 & 4); Khushbu (Season 1); Archana Chandhoke (Season 1); Devayani Rajakumaran (Season 3); Rachitha Mahalakshmi (Season 3); Sneha (Season 4); Mirchi Senthil (Season 4); Samyuktha (Season 4)
- Country of origin: India
- Original language: Tamil
- No. of seasons: 4

Production
- Producer: Balamurugan K
- Camera setup: Multi-camera
- Running time: approx. 40-45 minutes per episode
- Production company: Sunday Productions

Original release
- Network: Zee Tamil
- Release: 7 August 2016 – present

Junior Super Stars is a 2016 Tamil-language children talent-search reality show on Zee Tamil. It was initially premiered from the year 2016 also available to watch on digital platform ZEE5. Based on the Hindi language show India's Best Dramebaaz. It is a children's acting show, between the ages of 4–14 years as the participants. The show first season was premiered on 7 August 2016.

This show turns to be the game changer of Zee Tamil where it becomes No.1 Reality Show in TamilNadu with 5.5+ TVR.

== Seasons overview ==
Season	Episodes	Original Broadcast		Winner
Season	Episodes	First Aired	Last Aired	Winner
1	40	7 August 2016	18 December 2016	Ashwanth Ashokkumar
2	40+1 (Special Episode)	13 May 2017	24 September 2017	Bhavass
3	25	10 March 2019	25 September 2019	
4	28	26 December 2021	10 April 2022	Elantamizh

== Host and judges ==
Seasons	Hosts	Judges
1	Kiki Vijay	K. Bhagyaraj; Khushbu; Archana Chandhoke
2	Kiki Vijay	Roja; K. Bhagyaraj; Archana Chandhoke
3	Kamal Dhandapani; Anjana Rangan	K. Bhagyaraj; Devayani Rajakumaran; Rachitha Mahalakshmi
4	Keerthi Shanthanu	Sneha; Mirchi Senthil; Samyuktha

== Season 1 ==
The first season aired on every Saturday and Sunday at 19:00 from 7 August to 18 December 2016 and ended with 40 Episodes. This show builds up the acting abilities of kids from ages 5–15 years. K. Bhagyaraj, Khushbu and Archana Chandhoke are the judges of the show. Kiki Vijay (Keerthi Shanthanu) as the host.

Ashwanth Ashokkumar, the winner of this season and Lisa, the 3rd Runner-up of this season, appeared together in the serial Mella Thirandhathu Kadhavu that aired on Zee Tamil.

- Title Winners of Junior Super Star 1 : Ashwanth Ashokkumar
- 1st Runner-up : Vanessa
- 2nd Runner-up : Pavithra
- 3rd Runner-up : Lisha

=== Contestants ===
- Ashwanth Ashokkumar
- Pavithra Rajasekaran
- Lisha Rajkumar
- Adhitri Guruvayappan
- Gokul
- Kasin Kalith F
- Prathiksha
- Nirmal
- Kaavya
- Sreedhar
- Litish Pranav
- Krishanth
- Diya Sree
- Akshaya
- Devasaran
- Karthika Sree
- Praveen
- Poojitha
- Thirukurali
- Versha

=== Special guest Judges ===
- Lakshmy Ramakrishnan
- Robo Shankar
- Sathish
- Santhanam

== Season 2 ==
The second season was premiered on 13 May 2017. The show was aried on every Saturday and Sunday at 19:00. Actor and the director K. Bhagyaraj has officially once again been appointed as the judge with Roja and Archana Chandhoke. Kiki Vijay (Keerthi Shanthanu) as the host. The season winner is Bhavass.

- Title Winners of Junior Super Star 2 : Bhavass
- 1st Runner-up : Nithyasri and Karmugil
- 2nd Runner-up : Niharika

=== Contestants ===
- Aasmi
- Adithya
- Ajay
- Akshayaa
- Andrieya
- Anushka
- Bhavass
- Bhuvanika
- Hajeera
- Harishini
- Karmukil Vannan
- Lingwswaran
- Manisha
- Migamed Nafil
- Niharika
- Nithya Sree
- Rithanya
- Roshan Krishna
- Saiharish
- Santhosh
- Varun
- Vishwa

== Season 3 ==
The third season was premiered on 10 March 2019. The show was hosted by Kamal Dhandapani and Anjana Rangan while Actor K. Bhagyaraj, Devayani Rajakumaran and Rachitha Mahalakshmi are the judges of the show. This show builds up the acting of the children aged 4–14 years show their acting talent in front of the audience. The children will perform for plays with different genres.

=== Contestants ===
- Sanvi
- Vishmaya Veeralakshmi
- Tharun Kumar
- Monisha
- Deepesh
- Sahana
- Riya Manoj

== Season 4 ==
The fourth season was aired on every Saturday and Sunday at 18:30 from 26 December 2021 to 10 April 2022 and ended with 28 Episodes. Sneha, Mirchi Senthil and Samyuktha as the judges. Keerthi Shanthanu as the hosts. Poornitha and Amuthavanan as the Mentors. The season winner is Elantamizh.

- Title Winners of Junior Super Star 4 : Elantamizh
- 1st Runner-up : Kavyashri
- 2nd Runner-up : Sriram

=== Contestants ===
- Prashitha
- Aadhavan
- Tarika
- Saathvik
- Sree Saravanan
- Elantamizh
- Samyuktha
- Edil
- Udhai Priyan
- Dhushvanth
- Thanyashree
- Bablu
- Krishika
- Tharun
- Yaliniyan
- Sriram
- Harish
- Aalam
- Sowmiya
- Kavyashree
- Samiksha
- Aparna
- Anvitha
- Aadharsh
