= Pavunnu Pavunuthan =

- DVD cover
- Directed by: K. Bhagyaraj
- Written by: K. Bhagyaraj
- Produced by: Eknaath
- Starring: K. Bhagyaraj; Rohini
- Cinematography: V. Ramamoorthy
- Edited by: S. M. V. Subbu
- Music by: K. Bhagyaraj
- Production company: Eknaath Movie Creations
- Release date: 14 April 1991
- Country: India
- Language: Tamil

Pavunu Pavunuthan is a 1991 Indian Tamil-language drama film written and directed by K. Bhagyaraj. He also starred in the film and composed the music. The film was released on 14 April 1991. It was dubbed into Telugu as Chilipi Sipayi and released on 24 January 1992.

== Plot ==
The story begins with a flashback of Chinnu on a train, recounting his life story to fellow passengers. In the past, Chinnu, a commando captain, visits a village Poolampatti. Upon arrival, he is reminded of his childhood, which he left behind 20 years ago at the age of 7, after his father beat him for his mischievous ways. Without revealing his true identity, Chinnu rents a room at Krishnan "Icefruit" Iyer's residence. He becomes smitten with Pavunu and attempts to win her heart, but she rejects his advances, awaiting the return of her uncle, who has been absent for 20 years. Pavunu's maternal uncle, Aarumuga "Paalkaara" Gounder, and his daughter Soodamani, are struggling to make ends meet due to poverty. Chinnu offers them financial assistance to gain their support in winning Pavunu's affection. A letter addressed to Paalkaara Gounder arrives, supposedly from his son, announcing his return in 10 days and revealing that he is already married. Upon hearing the news, Pavunu attempts to take her own life. Chinnu intervenes, revealing that he wrote the letter as a prank, and that he is, in fact, Pavunu's long-lost uncle. Pavunu, overwhelmed with emotion, tattoos her name on Chinnu's chest.

Meanwhile, Periyathanam, the village president, harbors a grudge against Chinnu due to a past disagreement. Periyathanam manipulates the police inspector into confronting Chinnu, leading to a physical altercation. Chinnu arranges for Soodamani's marriage, and during the ceremony, he proposes marrying Pavunu immediately, citing the possibility of being called away to war at any moment. Although Chinnu is initially hesitant, the villagers persuade him to proceed with the marriage. Just moments before the wedding ceremony, a message from the Army arrives, revealing that Gounder's real son, Chinnu, had actually died. This shocking revelation exposes the imposter, known as Military, who had been masquerading as Chinnu all along. Military had worked alongside Gounder's son in the Army and, upon learning about Chinnu's family, had attempted to do a good deed by not disappointing the family members. Gounder's family, being impoverished and eagerly awaiting their son's return, had been kept in the dark.

At the village panchayat, Gounder accepts Military as his son Chinnu. However, Periyathanam's complaint leads to Military's arrest for impersonation. Pavunu is also outraged by Military's deception. With the help of Icefruit Iyer, an Army major arrives to release Military. Soodamani reveals that Military had confided in her about his true identity, and he had lied to prevent Pavunu's attempted suicide. Military had asked Soodamani to inform Pavunu, but she had refused, fearing it would render Pavunu's life meaningless. Pavunu eventually understands Soodamani's decision to accept Military as her brother. Military attempts to convince Pavunu, but she remains unmoved. Military saves the corrupt Inspector from a group of goons and the now reformed Inspector then asks for Soodamani's hand in marriage, and the wedding takes place. Soon after, Pavunu's mother passes away. Periyathanam secretly arranges a marriage invitation for Pavunu and Military, sending it to the villagers to create the impression that Military is coercing Pavunu into marriage. At the panchayat meeting, the villagers, influenced by Periyathanam, decide to expel Military from the village.

Upon hearing the panchayat's decision, Chinnu aka Military welcomes the outcome and begins preparations for the wedding, convinced that Pavunu will eventually accept him. Before the wedding day, Pavunu attempts to immolate herself but is thwarted by Chinnu. In a poignant revelation, Pavunu confesses that she cannot marry Chinnu, citing the tattoo of her uncle's name on her breast as a symbol of her enduring love for him. At Pavunu's behest, Chinnu leaves the village, sparing himself the humiliation of rejection before the entire village. Pavunu advises Chinnu to marry someone else, but he refuses, departing with a heavy heart.

At present, nearly a decade later, Chinnu returns to the village, only to witness Pavunu, now in a mentally fragile state, searching for him at the railway station. Chinnu takes Pavunu with him.

== Cast ==
- K. Bhagyaraj as Chinnu "Military"
- Rohini as Pavunu
- Saradha Preetha as Soodamani, Gounder's daughter
- Babitha as Pattu, Icefruit Iyer's wife
- Vasantha
- Kuladeivam Rajagopal as Aarumuga "Paalkaara" Gounder
- Nalinikanth as Periyathanam, village president
- Ashokkumar
- Gopinath Rao as Krishna "Icefruit" Iyer
- Sivaraman as a constable
- Pakoda Kadhar as a tea shop owner
- Theni Kunjarammal as Kunjarammal, a flower vendor
- Kovai Senthil as a temple priest
- Bonda Mani in an uncredited role
- Tirupur Ramasamy as an icecream vendor

== Soundtrack ==
Soundtrack was composed by K. Bhagyaraj.

Track listing
No.	Title	Lyrics	Singer(s)	Length
1.	"Thedhi Onnu"	Vaali	K. S. Chithra
2.	"Ennenna Suttiga"	Vairamuthu	Malaysia Vasudevan, S. Janaki
3.	"Mama Oru Malai Soottu"	Pulamaipithan	Malaysia Vasudevan, K. S. Chithra
4.	"Mama Unakku"	Pulamaipithan	S. Janaki
5.	"Uchchani" (male)	Vairamuthu	S. P. Balasubrahmanyam
6.	"Mullai Poo"	Vaali	S. P. Balasubrahmanyam, K. S. Chithra
7.	"Then Madurai"	Vairamuthu	S. P. Balasubrahmanyam, S. Janaki
8.	"Uchchani" (female)	Vairamuthu	S. Janaki

== Reception ==
N. Krishnaswamy of The Indian Express wrote, "The story line keeps you guessing about what is going to come at every turn, and the mix of comedy, sentiment, characterisation and plot development meshes well to create a film of such impact". Bhagyaraj won the Cinema Express Award for Best Best Story Writer.
