= Darling, Darling, Darling =

- Theatrical release poster
- Directed by: K. Bhagyaraj
- Written by: K. Bhagyaraj
- Produced by: Manickavasagam; Shanmugarajan
- Starring: K. Bhagyaraj; Poornima Jayaram; Suman
- Cinematography: Ashok Kumar
- Edited by: Shyam
- Music by: Shankar–Ganesh
- Production company: Vigranth Creation
- Release date: 14 November 1982
- Running time: 150 minutes
- Country: India
- Language: Tamil

Darling, Darling, Darling is a 1982 Indian Tamil-language romantic drama film, written and directed by K. Bhagyaraj. The film stars him, Poornima Jayaram and Suman. It was released on 14 November 1982. The film was remade in Kannada as Premi No. 1 (2001).

== Plot ==
In Ooty, Raja, the son of a watchman, Singaram who works in the household of a wealthy businessman Selvam. As children, Raja and Selvam's daughter Radha are inseparable friends at school. Before Radha leaves for the United States, Raja makes a promise to visit her pet dog's grave daily until her return. Ten years pass, and Raja, now unemployed, is still nostalgic about Radha, constantly reminiscing about their childhood memories. His sister, Lakshmi, works at a horse ranch. When Radha returns from the US with four friends, Raja eagerly awaits her arrival at the train station, introducing himself as Singaram's son. However, Radha, having forgotten their childhood bond, treats him as a mere porter, asking him to carry their luggage. Later, Radha and her friends request a tour guide from Singaram, who assigns Raja to accompany them during their stay in Ooty.

Raja takes Radha and her friends to the dog cemetery, where he gives her flowers to pay her respects. Radha's friends find Raja's behavior peculiar, and Radha, having no memory of the dog, tells him to stop such stupid acts. Later, Lakshmi asks Raja about his love, and he falsely claims that Radha has accepted him. Singaram overhears this and is delighted. The next day, Raja visits Radha and shows her their childhood photos, hoping to jog her memory. However, Radha appears interested only in her own photos and cuts Raja out of them, leaving him disheartened. Upon returning home, Raja finds new furniture, courtesy of a loan his father took in anticipation of his marriage to Radha. Raja then drives the girls to a park, where they disrupt a karate training session. To protect Radha's friends, Raja challenges the trainees to a fight and emerges victorious, impressing the trainer and the girls. Later, on April Fools' Day, the girls play a prank on Raja with a fake love letter, to which he responds with a heartfelt declaration of loyalty to his true love. Radha, unaware of Raja's true feelings, decides to help him unite with his supposed love. However, when she discusses this with Singaram, Raja's true intentions are revealed: he loves Radha and wants to marry her. Radha is taken aback, and Raja's sister overhears the conversation, learning that Radha is already engaged to Ashok, who is arriving the next day.

The next day, Ashok and his cohorts move into Radha's house. Raja observes Ashok's behavior, declaring him a suitable match for Radha. Raja begins to address Radha with respect, acknowledging his position as a servant in the household. However, Seth discovers Radha's engagement to Ashok and, realizing Singaram won't gain access to Selvam's property, removes the new furniture from Raja's home and demands the remaining debt repayment. Raja drives Ashok and Radha to a restaurant, where Radha gives him money to buy his sister a rold-gold jewel. Instead, Raja donates the money to a needy family, which impresses Radha. At home, Ashok mistreats Raja, taking advantage of his servant status, but Raja endures it for Radha's sake. Later, Ashok forces Raja to drink alcohol against his will, but Raja still helps Ashok when he collapses from excessive drinking. Raja shares this with Lakshmi, who suggests a secret revenge plan that won't implicate him to Radha. Disguising himself as a superhero, Raja confronts Ashok's accomplices. The next day, Radha gifts Lakshmi a gold jewel, but Lakshmi refuses, citing Radha's insensitivity, which hurts Radha's feelings.

On their way back from a wedding, their car breaks down in the rain. Raja tries to fix it while Ashok grows impatient and takes Radha to a nearby guesthouse. Ashok's behavior becomes inappropriate while Radha is changing, disgusting her, and she returns to the car. Raja hesitantly agrees to Radha's demand and they set off on a bicycle towards her house. En route, Raja and Radha fall from the bicycle and Radha gets injured while her dress is stuck to the bicycle gear. Unlike Ashok, Raja shows respect and covers her with his coat. He nurses her back to health at home. Ashok, seeing old photos of Raja and Radha, falsely accuses her of infidelity. Radha begins to despise Ashok and reunites with Raja, even proposing to him. Meanwhile, Seth, who had been threatening Singaram, now asks for a loan, hoping to benefit from Raja and Radha's union. Radha travels to Chennai to seek her father's approval for their marriage.

However, Selvam's company, "Radha's Chit Funds," suffers significant losses due to employee fraud. Gopi, Ashok's father and a close associate of Selvam, helps him revive the business. As a result, Selvam becomes indebted to Gopi and promises to marry Radha to Ashok, Gopi's son. Radha confides in Raja about her situation, feeling obligated to obey her father and protect his honor. One night, Ashok's father discovers Radha's diary and learns about her past relationship with Raja. Radha apologizes, but Ashok's father rebukes her for nearly betraying a loyal man who has loved her for ten years. Ultimately, Radha and Raja reunite.

== Cast ==
- K. Bhagyaraj as Raja (Raju)
- Poornima Jayaram as Radha
- Suman as Ashok
- Kallapetti Singaram as Singaram
- V. Gopalakrishnan as Gopi, Ashok's father
- Senthamarai as Selvam, Radha's father
- Mucherla Aruna
- Indhira as Lakshmi
- Master Suresh as young Raja
- Baby Anju as young Radha
- Pandiarajan as a new watchman (uncredited)
- J. Livingston as Livingston, T.T.E. (uncredited)

== Production ==
The film was launched at AVM Studios. Bhagyaraj differentiated Darling, Darling, Darling from his previous films, which were more on realism and less on the technical aspects, by doing the opposite. After he wrote the script, Poornima was the first actress he thought of when casting the female lead. The filming was held at Kodaikanal. Bhagyaraj almost worked on editing at the shooting location by bringing Movie Yala machine from Madras (now Chennai). Bhagyaraj initially planned the climax as his character jumping off the cliff but lands on the tree in the valley; however since he could not get a location with valley he altered the climax by making his character walking on the top of hill plains.

== Soundtrack ==
The music was composed by Shankar–Ganesh.

Track listing
| No. | Title | Lyrics | Singer(s) | Length |
|---|---|---|---|---|
| 1. | "Azhagiya Vezhigilil" | Pulamaipithan | S. P. Balasubrahmanyam, Vani Jairam | 4:21 |
| 2. | "My Dear" | Muthulingam | S. P. Balasubrahmanyam, Vani Jairam | 4:10 |
| 3. | "Oh Nenje" | Karuvikkarambai Shanmugam | S. P. Balasubrahmanyam, S. P. Charan, Pallavi, Vasantha | 4:31 |
| Total length: | | | | 13:02 |

== Critical reception ==
Thiraignani of Kalki praised the acting of Bhagyaraj, Suman and Poornima and concluded by calling the film as slightly high-class. Balumani of Anna appreciated the acting of cast and music.
