= Suvarilladha Chiththirangal =

1979 Tamil film by K. Bhagyaraj

- Poster
- Directed by: K. Bhagyaraj
- Written by: K. Bhagyaraj
- Produced by: K. Gopinathan
- Starring: Sudhakar; K. Bhagyaraj; Sumathi
- Cinematography: B. S. Pasavaraj
- Edited by: R. Baskaran
- Music by: Gangai Amaran
- Production company: Bagavathy Creations
- Release date: 30 November 1979
- Country: India
- Language: Tamil

Suvarilladha Chiththirangal (transl. Canvasless pictures) is a 1979 Indian Tamil-language drama film written and directed by K. Bhagyaraj in his directorial debut. The film stars Sudhakar, Bhagyaraj and Sumathi. It was released on 30 November 1979, and became a box office success. The film was remade in Telugu as Pedala Brathukulu, with Sudhakar and Sumathi reprising their roles.

== Plot ==
Saroja, a high school student, is the eldest daughter of Parvathy, a single mother struggling to make ends meet. Parvathy works as a tailor to provide for her four children, with occasional financial assistance from a cloth store owner. Their neighbor, Alagappan, a drama writer, harbors a secret affection for Saroja. He frequently steals money from his home and shifts the blame onto his innocent father, Veeramuthu Gounder. Meanwhile, Santhamurthy "Murthy", a young man from a wealthy family, is engaged to his cousin Selvi. However, after a few encounters with Saroja, he finds himself drawn to her. Saroja, too, develops feelings for Murthy, but Alagappan mistakenly assumes she has feelings for him. Murthy befriends Saroja's neighbor, Kaliyannan, a tailor, and also joins Alagappan's drama troupe to spend more time with Saroja.

Veeramuthu Gounder, observing Alagappan and Saroja together, assumes they are in love. Saroja embarks on a school excursion to Ooty, funded by Alagappan. Murthy provides Alagappan with modern attire and Alagappan secretly follows her to Ooty, only to discover that Murthy and Saroja are in love. Due to a school strike, Saroja returns home early, where she witnesses her mother, Parvathy, in a compromising situation with the cloth store owner who had been supporting their family. Parvathy confesses to her daughter that she had resorted to this arrangement solely for the benefit of their children, despite it being against her conscience. Saroja to live with modesty, asks Parvathy to sever ties with the cloth store owner, while she discontinues her education to work and support her family. She stops meeting Murthy too. Murthy's father refuses to accept his relationship with Saroja, leading to a rift between them. Murthy's cousin and fiancée, Selvi, takes her own life after being rejected, ensuring that Murthy can never return to his home and is now struggling financially.

Despite Saroja's insistence that he leave, Murthy chooses to stay with her family. They both find employment, but it is short-lived, plunging the entire family into poverty and hunger. Alagappan, who has been watching over them, decides to help. Alagappan learns that Saroja needs Rs. 2000 to secure a job at a supermarket. Kaliyannan informs him that a bride's father is offering Rs. 2000 as a dowry for his daughter's second marriage. Alagappan marries that woman solely to obtain the dowry and help Saroja. But the money goes lost and Alagappan's mother, outraged by his actions, disowns him. As the family's struggles intensify, the cloth store owner offers financial assistance for Babu's medical emergency, but Saroja declines, leading to Babu's demise. The family's desperation grows, and the second youngest sibling is forced to steal bread to survive.

Parvathy, filled with regret and anger, decides to seek help from the cloth store owner once again. However, he callously rejects her, instead proposing that one of Parvathy's daughters accompany him in exchange for financial support. The family is shocked and horrified by his suggestion. Saroja's younger sister, who has just reached puberty, decides to sacrifice her dignity to feed her family. Saroja, however, refuses to compromise her values and decides to take a drastic step. Saroja buys jangiri sweets laced with poison and serves them to her family members. Murthy finally sees Alagappan with his toddler stepdaughter, reminding him of the sacrifices he made for Saroja's family. After marrying, Murthy and Saroja also consume the poisoned sweets, and the entire family succumbs to the poison. The next morning, the neighborhood is seen mourning the family's demise, lamenting that they died without clearing their debts to the community.

== Cast ==
- Sudhakar as Santhamurthy "Murthy"
- K. Bhagyaraj as Alagappan
- Sumathi as Saroja
- Goundamani as Kaliyannan, a tailor
- S. Varalakshmi as Murthy's mother
- Gandhimathi as Alagappan's mother
- Kallapetti Singaram as Veeramuthu Gounder, Alagappan's father
- M. V. Murugan as a cloth store owner
- Charulatha
- C. R. Saraswathi as Selvi, Murthy's cousin
- Parthiban as Murthy's father
- Chandrasekar as a villager
- Janagaraj as Palanisamy, a villager
- Master Haja Sheriff as Kathavarayan, Kaliyannan's assistant

== Production ==
Suvarilladha Chiththirangal marked the directorial debut of K. Bhagyaraj. He also acted in the film after one of the actors backed out.

== Soundtrack ==
The music was composed by Gangai Amaran. The song "Kaadhal Vaibogame" was later remixed by Srikanth Deva for the film Perumal (2009).

Song	Singers	Lyrics	Length
"Aadidum Odamaai"	S. P. Balasubrahmanyam, S. P. Sailaja	Muthulingam	3:42
"Kadhal Vaibhogame"	Malaysia Vasudevan, S. Janaki	Kannadasan	3:45
"Welcome"	S. P. Balasubrahmanyam	Gangai Amaran	4:52

== Reception ==
Kousigan of Kalki appreciated the photography, music and dialogues.
