= Kanni Paruvathile =

- Poster
- Directed by: B. V. Balaguru
- Screenplay by: K. Bhagyaraj
- Story by: Vairavan
- Produced by: S. A. Rajkannu
- Starring: Rajesh; K. Bhagyaraj; Vadivukkarasi
- Cinematography: P. Ganesh Pandian
- Edited by: T. Thirunavukkarasu
- Music by: Shankar–Ganesh
- Production company: Sri Amman Creations
- Distributed by: Sri Amman Creations
- Release date: 21 September 1979
- Country: India
- Language: Tamil

Kanni Paruvathile (transl. At a young age) is a 1979 Indian Tamil-language film directed by B. V. Balaguru, starring Rajesh, K. Bhagyaraj and Vadivukkarasi. The screenplay was written by Bhagyaraj. The film is about an impotent husband (Rajesh) – who was injured by a bull in a village jallikattu event – and his wife (Vadivukarasi). The story revolves around how they deal with the daily pressures of society and another man (Bhagyaraj), who wants to have an extra-marital relationship with the woman. The film was released on 21 September 1979.

== Plot ==
Kannama, an innocent village belle, is in love with Subbiah. Subbiah is an orphan and hence, denied marriage with Kannama by her father. Subbiah's friend Cheenu comes to the village and, with his support, Subbiah abducts Kannama and marries her. After his marriage, Subbiah learns that he is unfit for married life. Kannama and Subbiah keep this a secret and pretend to all that they are leading a happy life. One day, in a weak moment, Kannama almost gives herself to Cheenu, who is a womaniser. He learns of Subbiah's problem and starts torturing Kannama.

== Cast ==
- Rajesh as Subbiah
- K. Bhagyaraj as Cheenu
- Vadivukkarasi as Kannamma
- G. Srinivasan
- Muthubharathi

== Production ==
Kanni Paruvathile is the first film for Rajesh in a leading role. Bhagyaraj initially recommended Vijayakanth for that role. While Bhagyaraj was coaching the original actor cast as the antagonist on acting, the makers, impressed with Bhagyaraj's performance, cast him in that role instead. The film was launched in October 1978 at Prasad Studios in Madras. It was shot prominently in villages around Tiruchirappalli.

== Soundtrack ==
The music was composed by Shankar–Ganesh. The song "Pattuvana" is set to the Carnatic raga Shivaranjani.

Track listing
No.	Title	Lyrics	Singer(s)	Length
1.	"Aavaram Poomani"	Muthubharathi	S. Janaki
2.	"Pattuvana" (male)	Pulamaipithan	Malaysia Vasudevan
3.	"Nadaya Mathu"	Nethaji	Malaysia Vasudevan, S. Janaki
4.	"Pattuvana" (female)	Pulamaipithan	S. Janaki

== Critical reception ==
Kousigan of Kalki said the film failed to recreate the magic of producer Rajkannu's previous ventures 16 Vayathinile and Kizhakke Pogum Rail. Naagai Dharuman of Anna praised the cast, music, cinematography and direction.
