= Vellankoil =

Village in India

Coordinates: 11.381°N 77.483°E

Vellankoil is a village located in Erode District in the state of Tamil Nadu, India. The village is 14 kilometres (8.7 mi) from Gobichettipalayam and 30 kilometres (19 mi) from Erode.
