= K. Bhagyaraj =

Indian film director and actor (1953–2026)

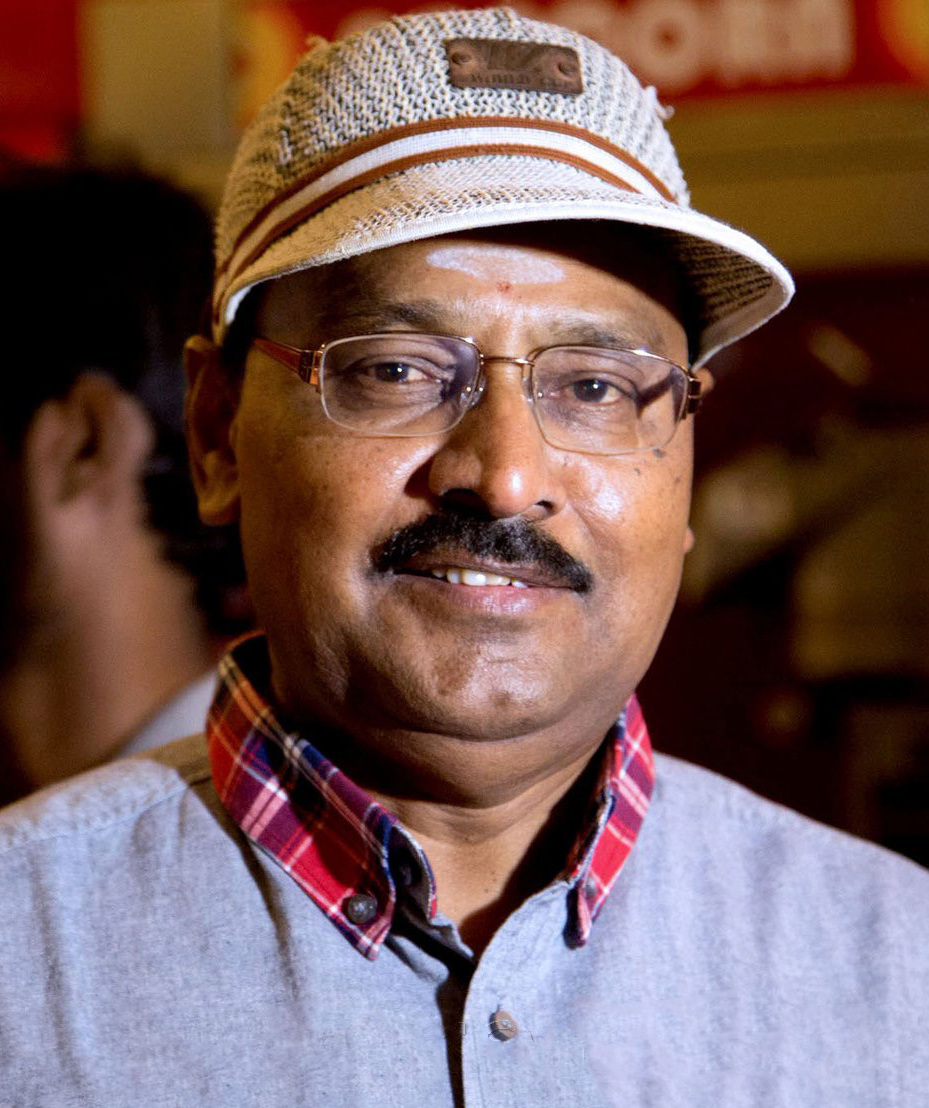
- K. Bhagyaraj in 2014
- Born: 7 January 1953; Vellankoil, Erode District, India
- Died: 27 June 2026 (aged 73); Chennai, Tamil Nadu, India
- Occupations: Film director; Screenwriter; Actor; Composer; Writer; Film producer; Politician
- Years active: 1977–2026
- Spouses: Praveena Bhagyaraj (m. 1981; died 1983) Poornima Bhagyaraj (m. 1984)
- Children: 2, including Shanthanu

Krishnaswamy Bhagyaraj (7 January 1953 – 27 June 2026) was an Indian filmmaker, actor, musician and politician. He worked predominantly in Tamil cinema, while also directing and acting in films in other Indian languages. He wrote and directed more than 25 films and acted in over 75 films, and was regarded as one of the most influential writer-directors in Tamil cinema during the 1980s. He edited the Tamil weekly magazine Bhagya and authored several novels.

Bhagyaraj was born in Vellankoil, near Gobichettipalayam, in 1953. He began working in the Tamil film industry in the mid-1970s as an assistant director under G. Ramakrishnan and Bharathiraja. He began writing scripts and dialogues for films, while also appearing in smaller acting roles. Beginning in the early 1980s, Bhagyaraj started directing films and often appeared in the lead role in the films he directed. He also directed a few remakes of his films in Hindi. He emerged as one of the leading screenwriters and directors in Tamil cinema during the 1980s and early 1990s. In later years, he directed a few films, and also appeared as a supporting actor in several films.

He founded MGR Makkal Munnetra Kazhagam in 1989. He joined the All India Anna Dravida Munnetra Kazhagam later, before joining the Dravida Munnetra Kazhagam in 2005. He was active in politics in the 1990s and early 2000s.

Bhagyaraj received the Tamil Nadu State Film Award for Best Dialogue Writer for Puthiya Vaarpugal (1979), the Filmfare Award for Best Actor – Tamil for Mundhanai Mudichu (1983), and the SIIMA Lifetime Achievement Award in 2014.

== Background ==
Krishnaswamy Bhagyaraj was born on 7 January 1953 in Vellankoil near Gobichettipalayam in Coimbatore district (present-day Erode district). He is from a Telugu Kamma family, and his forefathers migrated from Andhra Pradesh to Tamil Nadu.

In 1981, Bhagyaraj married actress Praveena, who was his co-star in Bhama Rukmani (1980). She died due to jaundice in August 1983. On 7 February 1984, he married actress Poornima Bhagyaraj, who was his co-star in Darling, Darling, Darling (1982). The couple had a daughter Saranya Bhagyaraj and a son Shanthnu Bhagyaraj, both of whom are actors.

Bhagyaraj died from a cardiac arrest on 27 June 2026, at the age of 73 and was cremated with full state honors.

== Film career ==
=== Early years (1977–1979) ===
Beginning his career as an assistant to directors G. Ramakrishnan on the film Ezhai Panakkaran, which came to a halt after two days. Thereafter, he went on to work with Bharathiraja, Bhagyaraj became recognised for his scriptwriting talent. He first appeared as a junior artist playing small roles with in films such as 16 Vayathinile (1977) and later appeared similarly in Sigappu Rojakkal (1978). He was assistant director to Bharathiraja in two films – 16 Vayathinile and Kizhakke Pogum Rail. Among his early work was writing the script for Bharathiraja's films Kizhake Pogum Rail (1978) and Tik Tik Tik (1981), and writing dialogues for Sigappu Rojakkal. He made his directorial début with Suvarilladha Chiththirangal in 1979 and also his debut as the leading man in Puthiya Vaarpugal, directed by Bharathiraja. He received the Tamil Nadu State Film Award for Best Dialogue Writer in Puthiya Vaarpugal (1979). He wrote dialogues and screenplays and acted in Kanni Paruvathile (1979).

=== Rise to stardom (1980–1999) ===
Bhagyaraj quickly established his own concern and started producing a string of distinctive films made mainly in Tamil. Bhagyaraj often cast himself in the lead roles of the films he scripted and directed, effectively carving out a niche for himself in the actor-auteur vein. His style of filmmaking is notable for its relatively elaborate, witty, and double-entendre-laced scripts and socially-themed framework. His on-screen personae are typically characterised by their ironic sense of humour and intelligent bravado.

He introduced actress Urvashi as a lead in the film Mundhanai Mudichu (1983) and Kalpana (sister of Urvashi) made her lead debut with the 1985 film Chinna Veedu, directed by Bhagyaraj, a commercially successful film. He received the Filmfare Award for Best Actor – Tamil in Mundhanai Mudichu.

His successful Tamil films written by him continued to be in demand for Hindi remakes in the 1980s and 1990s and were huge hits in Hindi – with Andha 7 Naatkal remade as Woh Saat Din and Enga Chinna Rasa remade as Beta (1992), both of which were successful.

Bhagyaraj rarely acted in films not directed or written by him, with exceptions being Anbulla Rajinikanth (1984) and Naan Sigappu Manithan (1985). He decided to direct the Hindi remake of Bharatiraja's 1984 directorial venture Oru Kaidhiyin Diary with Rajesh Khanna in the lead in 1985, but later Khanna due to his date issues had to opt out and Bhagyaraj cast Amitabh Bachchan in the Hindi remake Aakhree Raasta (1986). Bhagayraj decided to adapt a Kannada novel into a new film Enga Chinna Rasa in 1987, which became a blockbuster. In 1988, he wrote the script for Idhu Namma Aalu and decided to produce it, but chose not to direct it himself, as he wanted to act-write-direct a film on a serious issue, which was Aararo Aaariraro. He received the Best Film Award for Idhu Namma Aalu in 1990, directed by novel writer Balakumaaran, whereas the other film Aararo Aaariraro also was both critically acclaimed and successful at the box office.

From 1991, he gradually started accepting more acting offers as a lead hero, where director-producer-scriptwriter would be three different people, rather than he himself writing-directing-acting in his films. Rudhra, Amma Vanthachu, Gnanapazham and Suyamvaram were such successful films where he was involved only in the capacity of actor. He also started the weekly magazine "Bhagya" and he was the editor of that magazine. His successful directorial ventures written by him from 1991 on were Pavunnu Pavunuthan, Sundara Kandam, Raasukutti and Veetla Visheshanga. He cast his son Shanthanu Bhagyaraj as the child artist in Vaettiya Madichu Kattu in 1998 and the film dealt with the father-son relationship. This proved to be both a critical and financial disappointment capping an end to a string of continuous flops including Oru Oorla oru Rajakumari, Gnanapazham and Mr. Bechara (1996). He also wrote the script for the film Thaikulame Thaikulame (1995), starring Pandiarajan.

=== Last directions (2000–2010) ===
Bhagyaraj took a break from acting as the lead hero in films after the release of the huge critical and commercial failure Vaettiya Madichu Kattu. Instead, he directed the TV shows Neenga Nenaicha Saadhikkalanga and Idhu Oru Kadhayin Kadhai (for DD Podhigai), and appeared in Apapadi Podu on Jaya TV in this period. His tele-serial Rules Rangachari was very famous on the DD channel and it comprised 390 episodes. He wrote and directed the 2003 film Chokka Thangam, starring Vijayakanth. He launched his daughter Saranya Bhagyaraj with Parijatham, which he wrote and directed in 2006. He returned to acting with Something Something... Unakkum Enakkum and Rendu in supporting roles. In 2010, he directed his adult son Shanthanu Bhagyaraj in the romantic film Siddhu +2.

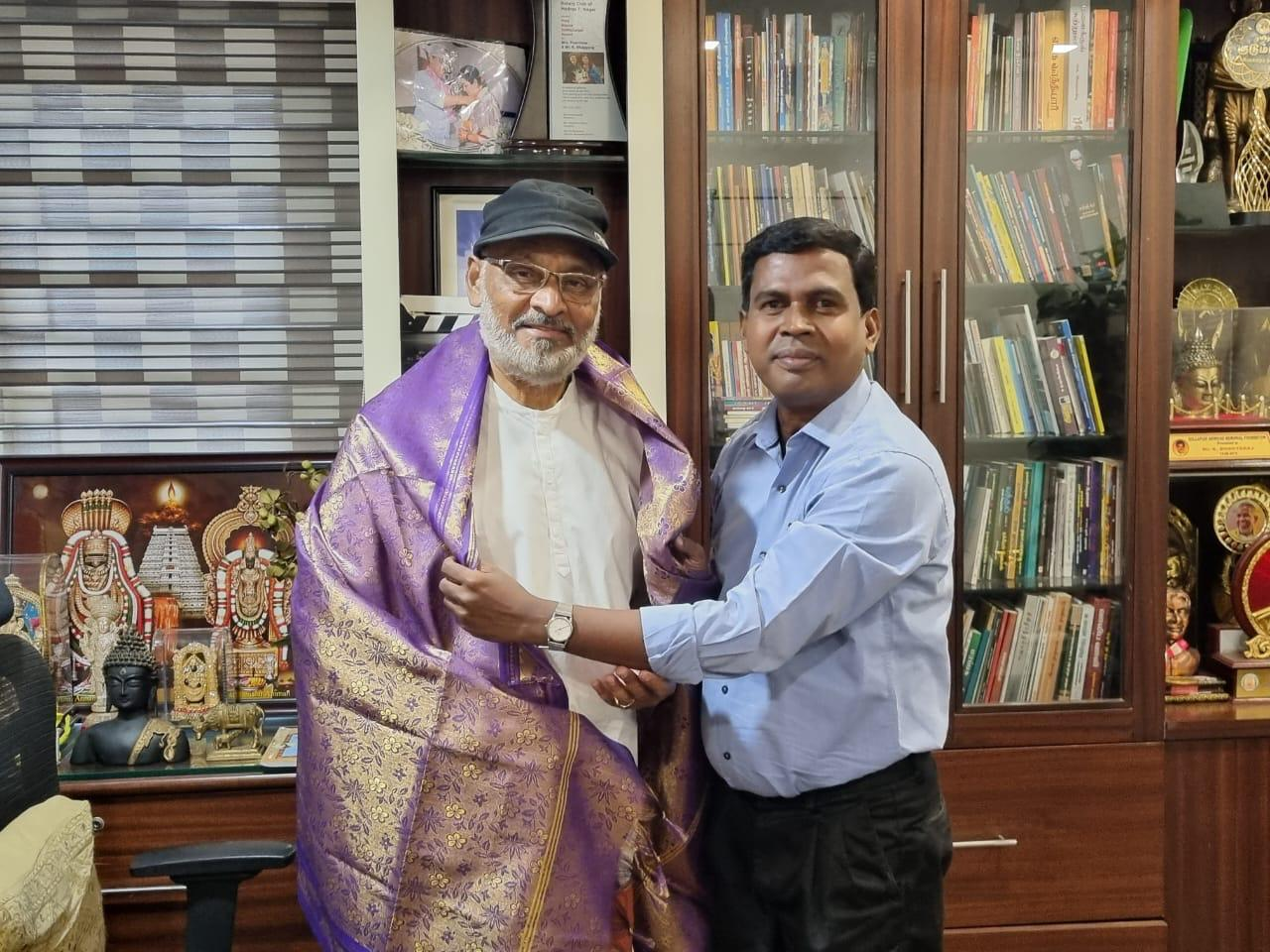
Bhagyaraj seen with a fan

=== Matured roles (2011–2026) ===
At the end of the 2010s, he acted in supporting roles such Appavi (2011) and Vaagai Sooda Vaa (2011). He ventured into Malayalam film as supporting actor with Mr. Marumakan (2012).

Bhagyaraj was the leading judge for the show Junior Super Star (2016) and Junior Super Stars (season 2) (2017).

He wrote books such as Vaanga Cinemavai Pattri Pesalam, Neenga Nenaicha Saadikkalaam and Ungal Bhagyaraj in Kelvi Bhadhil (Five Parts).

Bhagyaraj appeared in action thriller films which went on to become commercial hits with Kanithan (2016) and Thupparivaalan (2017).

In 2020, he later acted in the legal drama film Ponmagal Vandhal. Bhagyaraj plays a grandfather with Shanthanu in the adult comedy film Murungakkai Chips. In 2022, he starred in Super Senior Heroes.

He also appeared in Telugu films like Mem Vayasuku Vacham (2012), Red Alert (2015), Sita (2019), 35 Chinna Katha Kaadu (2024) and Kuberaa (2025).

In 2026, K. Bhagyaraj celebrated 50 years of their career in the film industry at an event. His final role, a voiceover in the film Beep, was released posthumously.

== Politics ==
MGR Makkal Munnetra Kazhagam (MGR Popular Progressive Federation) was a political party in the Indian state of Tamil Nadu launched by Bhagyaraj in February 1989. MGR MMK contested the 1991 Kerala assembly elections. It had one candidate, who got 87 votes. The MGR MMK party failed in its initial stages. Bhagyaraj later joined All India Anna Dravida Munnetra Kazhagam.

On 5 April 2006, Bhagyaraj joined the Dravida Munnetra Kazhagam in the presence of the party president M. Karunanidhi, and criticized the AIADMK general secretary Jayalalithaa. Later, he left DMK and remained as a spectator in politics.

== Controversy ==
While speaking to the media at a press event for the film Karuthukalai Pathivu Sei in 2019, Bhagyaraj remarked that women invite men to sexually assault them and provide them the room to do so. He went on to ask, why men are usually blamed for crimes while women encourage them, apparently in relation to the 2019 Pollachi sexual assault case. His misogynistic remarks drew widespread condemnation and opposition from the public, and several women's organisations demanded that he be prosecuted for them. The Tamil Nadu Commission for Women summoned him to appear before it.

== Filmography ==
- Note: All films are in Tamil, unless otherwise noted.

Year	Title	Credited as			Notes
Year	Title	Director	Writer	Producer	Notes
1978	Kizhake Pogum Rail		Dialogues		Additional dialogues only
1978	Sigappu Rojakkal		Dialogues		
1979	Niram Maratha Pookal		Story		
1979	Puthiya Vaarpugal		Dialogues		Tamil Nadu State Film Award for Best Dialogue Writer
1979	Kanni Paruvathile		Screenplay		
1979	Suvarilladha Chiththirangal	✓	✓		
1980	Bhama Rukmani		✓		
1980	Oru Kai Oosai	✓	✓	✓	
1980	Ilamai Kolam		✓		
1981	Mouna Geethangal	✓	✓		
1981	Indru Poi Naalai Vaa	✓	✓		
1981	Vidiyum Varai Kaathiru	✓	✓		
1981	Andha 7 Naatkal	✓	✓		
1982	Thooral Ninnu Pochu	✓	✓		
1982	Poi Satchi	✓	✓		
1982	Darling, Darling, Darling	✓	✓		
1983	Mundhanai Mudichu	✓	✓		Filmfare Award for Best Actor – Tamil
1983	Saattai Illatha Pambaram		✓		
1984	Dhavani Kanavugal	✓	✓	✓	
1985	Oru Kaidhiyin Diary		✓		
1985	Chinna Veedu	✓	✓		
1986	Aakhree Raasta	✓	✓		Hindi film; Remake of Oru Kaidhiyin Diary
1986	Kanna Thorakkanum Saami		✓		
1987	Enga Chinna Rasa	✓	✓		
1988	Idhu Namma Aalu		✓		
1989	Aararo Aaariraro	✓	✓	✓	
1989	Ponnu Pakka Poren		Story		
1990	Avasara Police 100	✓	✓		
1991	Pavunnu Pavunuthan	✓	✓		Cinema Express Award for Best Story Writer
1991	Rudhra		Screenplay		
1992	Sundara Kandam	✓	✓	✓	Cinema Express Award for Best Story Writer
1992	Rasukutty	✓	✓		
1994	Veetla Visheshanga	✓	✓		
1995	Oru Oorla Oru Rajakumari	✓	✓		
1995	Thaikulame Thaikulame		✓		
1996	Mr. Bechara	✓	✓		Hindi film; Remake of Veetla Visheshanga
1996	Gnanapazham		✓		
1998	Vaettiya Madichu Kattu	✓	✓	✓	
2000	Papa The Great	✓	✓		Hindi film; Simultaneously shot with Vaettiya Madichu Kattu
2000	Kabadi Kabadi		✓		
2003	Chokka Thangam	✓	✓		25th Film (Director)
2006	Parijatham	✓	✓	✓	
2007	Mudhal Mudhalai		Screenplay, dialogues		
2010	Siddhu +2	✓	Screenplay, dialogues	✓	
2011	Maaveeran		Dialogues		Tamil dubbed version of Telugu film Magadheera
2012	Love In Hyderabad		Screenplay		Telugu shelved film; Simultaneously shot with Siddhu +2
2015	Thunai Mudhalvar		✓		

=== Actor ===
==== Tamil films ====
Year	Title	Role	Notes
1977	16 Vayathinile	Village physician	Also assistant director; uncredited appearance
1978	Kizhake Pogum Rail	Ponnandi	Also assistant director
1978	Sigappu Rojakkal	Waiter	Also assistant director
1979	Puthiya Vaarpugal	Shanmugamani	
1979	Kanni Paruvathile	Cheenusamy	
1979	Suvarilladha Chiththirangal	Alagappan	
1980	Bhama Rukmani	Nandhagopal	
1980	Oru Kai Oosai	Chinnasamy	
1980	Kumari Pennin Ullathile	Balu	
1981	Mouna Geethangal	Raghunathan	
1981	Indru Poi Naalai Vaa	Pazhanisamy	
1981	Vidiyum Varai Kaathiru	Raja	
1981	Andha 7 Naatkal	Palakkad Madhavan	
1982	Thooral Ninnu Pochu	Chellai Durai	
1982	Poi Satchi	Vairavan	
1982	Darling, Darling, Darling	Raja	
1983	Mundhanai Mudichu	Shanmugamani	Filmfare Award for Best Actor – Tamil
1984	Oomai Janangal	Chellaiya	
1984	Anbulla Rajinikanth	Himself	Cameo appearance
1984	Dhavani Kanavugal	Subramaniam	
1985	Naan Sigappu Manithan	CID Chinna Salem Singaram	
1985	Chinna Veedu	Madhanagopal	
1987	Enga Chinna Rasa	Chinnarasu	
1987	Chinna Kuyil Paaduthu	Babu	Cameo appearance
1988	Idhu Namma Aalu	Gopalsamy	
1989	En Rathathin Rathame	Natesan	
1989	Aararo Aaariraro	Babu	
1990	Avasara Police 100	Ramu, Veerasamy Naidu	25th film; dual role
1991	Pavunnu Pavunuthan	Chinnu	
1991	Rudhra	Madurai	
1992	Sundara Kandam	Shanmugamani	
1992	Amma Vandhachu	Nandhakumar	
1992	Rasukutty	Rasukutty	
1994	Veetla Visheshanga	Gopalakrishnan	
1995	Oru Oorla Oru Rajakumari	Venkatasubramaniam	
1996	Gnanapazham	Gnanasuryan	
1998	Vaettiya Madichu Kattu	Jaiprakash	
1999	Suyamvaram	Gnanapithan	
2006	Parijatham	Sampooranam	
2006	Something Something Unakkum Enakkum	Krishnan	
2006	Rendu	CBI Officer Rathnakumar	
2007	Kasu Irukkanum	G. R.	
2008	Maanavan Ninaithal	Raj	
2009	Ninaithale Inikkum	Pazhaniyappan	
2010	Uthamaputhiran	Raghuram (Washington Vetrivel)	
2010	Siddhu +2	Himself	Cameo appearance
2011	Appavi	Ramasamy	
2011	Vaagai Sooda Vaa	Annamalai	
2013	Oruvar Meethu Iruvar Sainthu	Sundaram	50th Film
2014	Ninaithathu Yaaro	Himself	Cameo appearance
2014	3 Geniuses	Professor Ramanujam	Malaysian film
2015	Moone Moonu Varthai	Himself	
2016	Kanithan	Rajendran	
2016	Vaaimai	Rajarathnam	Cameo appearances
2017	Mupparimanam	Himself	Cameo appearances
2017	Ayyanar Veethi	Subramani Shastri	
2017	Veruli	Kesavan	Cameo appearance
2017	Ivan Yarendru Therikiratha	Love Guru Krishnasamy	
2017	Thupparivaalan	Muthu	
2017	Brahma.com	Sivagurunathan Shastri	
2018	Kilambitaangayaa Kilambitaangayaa	Sivaraman	
2018	Aaruthra	Avudaiappan	
2018	Koothan	Raghuraman	
2020	Ponmagal Vandhal	'Petition' Pethuraj	
2021	Murungakkai Chips	Kamasundaram	
2022	Super Senior Heroes	Ganeshan	Direct television release in Sun TV
2023	Dada	Chidambaram	
2023	Kathar Basha Endra Muthuramalingam	Kaluvan	
2023	3.6.9	Father Benet Castro	
2023	Moondram Manithan	Inspector Rajasekhar	75th Film
2023	Sarakku	Lawyer Parasuraman	Cameo appearances
2024	PT Sir	Judge Krishnamoorthy	Cameo appearances
2025	Enai Sudum Pani	Karunakaran	
2025	Aandavan	Nallasivam	
2025	Kuberaa	Sadhu	Bilingual film; simultaneously shot in Telugu
2025	Antha 7 Naatkal	Sundaram	
2025	BP 180	Lingam	
2026	Dark Giant	Sadhasivam	
2026	Dark	Karunakaran	Posthumous release
2026	Hi	Vaathiyar	Posthumous release

==== Other language films ====
Year	Title	Role	Language	Notes	Ref.
2003	Avuna		Telugu	Cameo appearance	
2004	Mee Intikoste Em Istaaru Maa Intkoste Em Testaaru		Telugu		
2012	Mem Vayasuku Vacham	Subramanyam	Telugu		
2012	Mr. Marumakan	Balasubrahmanyam	Malayalam		
2012	Love In Hyderabad	Himself	Telugu	Cameo appearance; shelved film	
2015	Red Alert	Doctor	Kannada		
2015	Red Alert	Doctor	Telugu		
2015	High Alert	Doctor	Malayalam		
2019	Sita	Vasanthavada Anand Mohan	Telugu		
2024	35	Principal Bucchi Reddy	Telugu		
2025	Kuberaa	Sadhu	Telugu	Simultaneously shot in Tamil	

=== Television ===
Serials

Year	Title	Role	Channel	Language	Notes
2020	Chithi 2	Himself	Sun TV	Tamil	Cameo appearances
2020	Raja Rani	Himself	Star Vijay	Tamil	Cameo appearances
2020	Senthoora Poove	Himself	Star Vijay	Tamil	Cameo appearances
2022	Vidhya No.1	Judge Subramani Vathiyar	Zee Tamil	Tamil	Cameo appearances

Shows

Year	Title	Role	Channel	Language	Notes
2014	Ninaithale Inikkum	Guest	Vendhar TV	Tamil	
2015	Koffee With DD	Guest	Vijay TV	Tamil	Along with Poornima and Pandiarajan
2016	Junior Super Star	Judge	Zee Tamil	Tamil	
2017	Junior Super Star 2	Judge	Zee Tamil	Tamil	
2019	Comedy Stars Season 2	Guest	Asianet	Malayalam	Along with Poornima
2020	Kodeeswari	Contestant	Colors Tamil	Tamil	Along with Poornima
2022	Super Queen	Guest	Zee Tamil	Tamil	

== Discography ==
- Note: All films are in Tamil, unless otherwise noted.

=== As composer ===
Year	Title	Notes
1985	Kavadi Sindhu	Shelved film
1988	Idhu Namma Aalu	
1988	Sahadevan Mahadevan	1 song
1989	Aararo Aaariraro	
1989	Ponnu Pakka Poren	
1990	Pattanamthan Pogalamadi	3 songs
1991	Pavunnu Pavunuthan	
1996	Gnanapazham	

=== As playback singer ===
Year	Film	Song	Composer	Notes
1988	Idhu Namma Aalu	"Pachamala Saami"	himself	
1989	Ponnu Paaka Poren	"Yerapooti"	himself	
1989	Aararo Aariraro	"Ellarumae Loosungathan"	himself	
