= Kovai Senthil =

Indian film actor

- Born: Kumarasamy c. 1944
- Died: 9 August 2018 (age 74); Coimbatore, India
- Other name: A. K. Senthil
- Occupation: Comedian
- Years active: 1980–2018

Kumarasamy, known by his stage name, Kovai Senthil, was a Tamil film character artist who appeared in Tamil films starting with Bhagyaraj's Oru Kai Osai. He appeared in over 400 Tamil films.

== Career ==
During his career, Kovai Senthil made several collaborations with Bhagyaraj including Aararo Aariraro and Avasara Police 100. He has starred in several notable films including Idhu Namma Aalu, Padayappa, Avvai Shanmugi and Goa.

== Selected filmography ==
This list is incomplete; you can help by expanding it.

Uncredited roles

- En Rathathin Rathame (1989)
- H2O (2002; Kannada)
- Thamizhan (2002)
- Bagavathi (2002)
- Anbe Sivam (2003)

Credited roles

- Oru Kai Osai (1980)
- Mouna Geethangal (1981)
- Aruvadai Naal (1986)
- Idhu Namma Aalu (1988)
- Ninaivu Chinnam (1989)
- Aararo Aariraro (1989)
- Palaivana Paravaigal (1990)
- Avasara Police 100 (1990)
- Thalattu Ketkuthamma (1991)
- Oyilattam (1991)
- Chinna Pasanga Naanga (1992)
- Gentleman (1993)
- Rajakumaran (1994)
- En Rajangam (1994)
- En Aasai Machan (1994)
- Mettupatti Mirasu (1994)
- Sathyavan (1994)
- Nattamai (1994)
- Vaa Magale Vaa (1994)
- Mani Rathnam (1994)
- Deva (1995)
- Minor Mappillai (1996)
- Avvai Shanmughi (1996)
- Minsara Kanavu (1997)
- Taraka Ramudu (1997; Telugu)
- Moovendhar (1998)
- Dhinamdhorum (1998)
- Natpukkaga (1998)
- Unnidathil Ennai Koduthen (1998)
- Annan (1999)
- Padayappa (1999)
- Kadhalar Dhinam (1999)
- Vaanathaippola (2000)
- Simmasanam (2000)
- Red (2002)
- Unnai Ninaithu (2002)
- Jjunction (2002)
- Album (2002)
- Style (2002)
- Dum (2003)
- Lesa Lesa (2003)
- Thirumalai (2003)
- Joot (2003)
- Soori (2003)
- Aai (2004)
- Viyabari (2007)
- Theeyavan (2008)
- Sandai (2008)
- Kadhalna Summa Illai (2009)
- Pinju Manasu (2009)
- Goa (2010)
- Tamizh Padam (2010)
- Minsaram (2011)
- Medhai (2012)
- Yaarukku Theriyum (2012)
- Arya Surya (2013)
- Aindhaam Thalaimurai Sidha Vaidhiya Sigamani (2014)
- Poojai (2014)
- Adhibar (2015)
- Mudinja Ivana Pudi / Kotigobba 2 (2016)
- Anbudan Anbarasi (2016)
- Tharisu Nilam (2017)
- Ayyanar Veethi (2017)
- Sattham (2019; Posthumous film)
- Ninaive Nee (2023; Posthumous film)
- Thudikkuthu Pujam (2023; Posthumous film)
- Iru Manasu (2024; Posthumous film)
- Thangakottai (2025; Posthumous film)

== Death ==
He died in 2018 due to age related issues. Kovai Senthil was 74 years old during his death.
