= List of awards and nominations received by Kamal Haasan =

Kamal Haasan awards and nominations
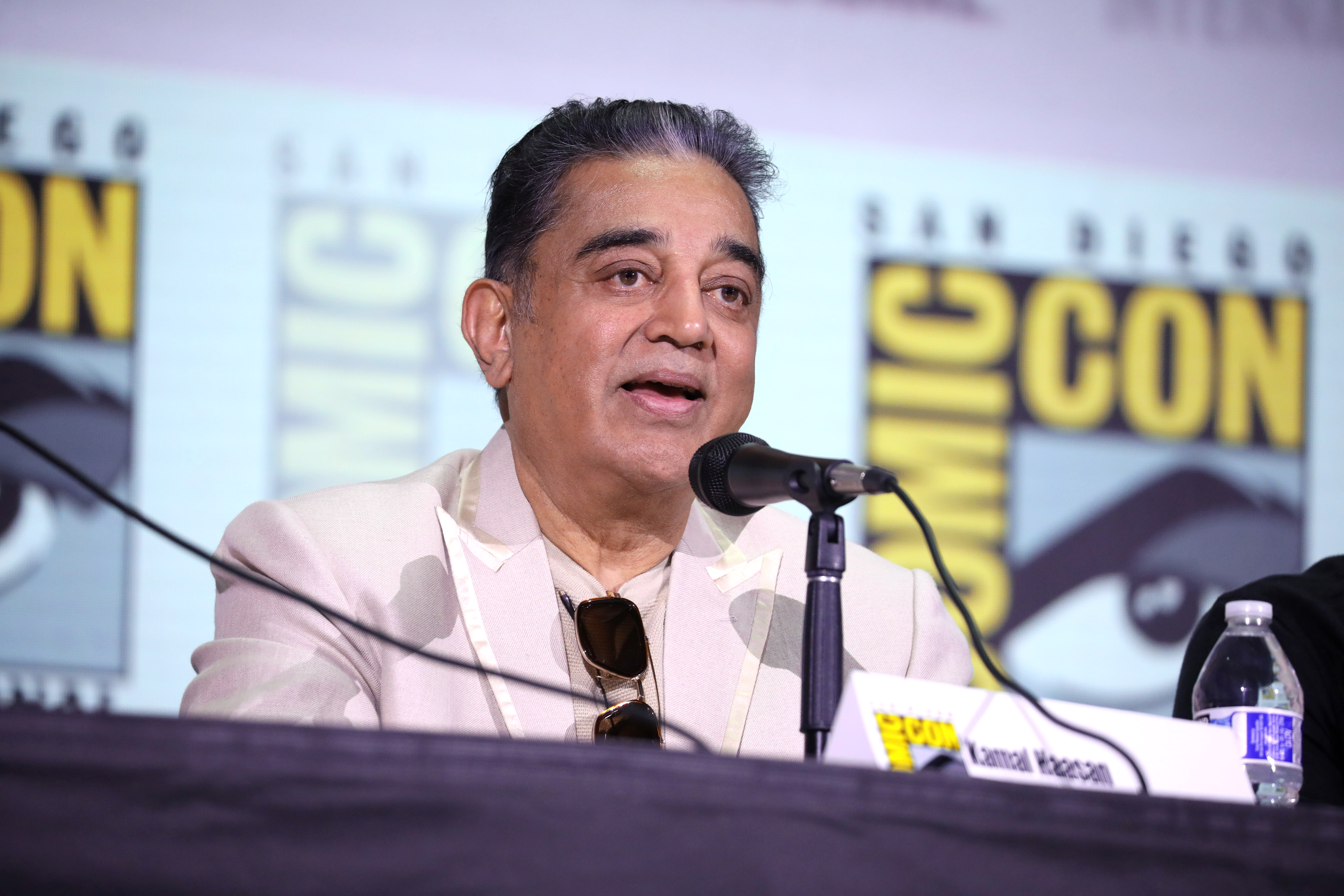
- Haasan at San Diego Comic-Con in 2023
Awards and nominations
Award	Wins	Nominations
Civilian Honours	3	3
Government Honours	3	3
National Film Awards	5	5
Filmfare Awards	21	64
Tamil Nadu State Film Awards	11	11
Nandi Awards	5	5
South Indian International Movie Awards	5	9
Ananda Vikatan Cinema Awards	5	7
Vijay Awards	8	16
Vijay Music Awards	2	2
Cinema Express Awards	13	13
Zee Cine Awards	2	3
Screen Awards	1	1
Bengal Film Journalists' Association Awards	2	2
Other Film Awards	14	15
Film Festival Awards	34	35
Other Honours	76	77
- Total number of wins and nominations
Totals	210	271

Kamal Haasan (Note: In an interview, Haasan revealed that Parthasarathy was one of the names given to him. He was initially named after the Parthasarathy deity at Pallava-era temple in Chennai. Later his father changed his name to Kamal Haasan. His name as per the records of Rajya Sabha is Shri Kamal Haasan.) (born 7 November 1954) is an Indian actor, filmmaker and politician who works primarily in Tamil cinema, and currently serving as a Member of Parliament, Rajya Sabha for Tamil Nadu.

== Overview ==
Haasan has won numerous accolades, including five National Film Awards, (Note: 1. Best Actor in a Leading Role for Moondram Pirai (1982); 2. Best Actor in a Leading Role for Nayakan (1987); 3. Best Actor in a Leading Role for Indian (1996); 4. Best Tamil Feature Film for Thevar Magan (1992); 5. National Film Award for Best Child Artist for Kalathur Kannamma (1960) (The award for best acting was given out as a Rashtrapati Award (President's Gold Medal) until the 14th National Film Awards ceremony held in 1967, when the National Awards were called as the "State Awards for Films". They were renamed to the current National Film Awards from the 15th National Film Awards ceremony held in 1968.)) twenty-one Filmfare Awards, (Note: 1. Best Actor – Malayalam for Kanyakumari (1974); 2. Best Actor – Tamil for Apoorva Raagangal (1975); 3. Best Actor – Tamil for Oru Oodhappu Kan Simittugiradhu (1976); 4. Best Actor – Tamil for 16 Vayathinile (1977); 5. Best Actor – Tamil for Sigappu Rojakkal (1978); 6. Best Actor – Malayalam for Eeta (1978); 7. Best Actor – Telugu for Aakali Rajyam (1981); 8. Best Actor – Tamil for Raja Paarvai (1981); 9. Best Actor – Telugu for Sagara Sangamam (1983); 10. Best Actor – Hindi for Saagar (1985); 11. Best Actor – Kannada for Pushpaka Vimana (1987); 12. Best Actor – Telugu for Indrudu Chandrudu (1989); 13. Best Actor – Tamil for Gunaa (1991); 14. Best Actor – Tamil for Thevar Magan (1992); 15. Best Actor – Tamil for Kuruthipunal (1995); 16. Best Actor – Tamil for Indian (1996); 17. Best Actor – Tamil for Hey Ram (2000); 18. Best Actor – Tamil for Vikram (2022); 19. Best Film – Tamil for Apoorva Sagodharargal (1989); 20. Best Film – Tamil for Amaran (2024); 21. Best Story – Hindi for Virasat (1997)) eleven Tamil Nadu State Film Awards, (Note: 1. Best Actor for 16 Vayathinile (1977); 2. Best Actor for Varumayin Niram Sivappu (1980); 3. Best Actor for Moondram Pirai (1982); 4. Best Actor for Apoorva Sagodharargal (1989); 5. Best Actor for Thevar Magan (1992); 6. Best Actor for Indian (1996); 7. Best Actor for Vettaiyaadu Vilaiyaadu (2006); 8. Best Actor for Dasavathaaram (2008); 9. Best Feature Film (Second Prize) for Thevar Magan (1992); 10. MGR Award (1989) and; 11. Nadigar Thilagam Sivaji Ganesan Award (1999) for Contributions to the development of Tamil cinema) and five Nandi Awards. (Note: 1. Best Actor for Sagara Sangamam (1983); 2. Best Actor for Swathi Muthyam (1986); 3. Best Actor for Indrudu Chandrudu (1989); 4. NTR National Award (2014) for Lifetime achievements and contributions to Indian cinema; 5. Paidipati Jairaj Award (2026) for Outstanding contributions to the growth and development of Indian cinema (given as Telangana Gaddar Film Awards from 2025)) He was honoured with the Kalaimamani in 1978, the Padma Shri in 1990, the Padma Bhushan in 2014, and the Order of Arts and Letters (Chevalier) by the Government of France in 2016.

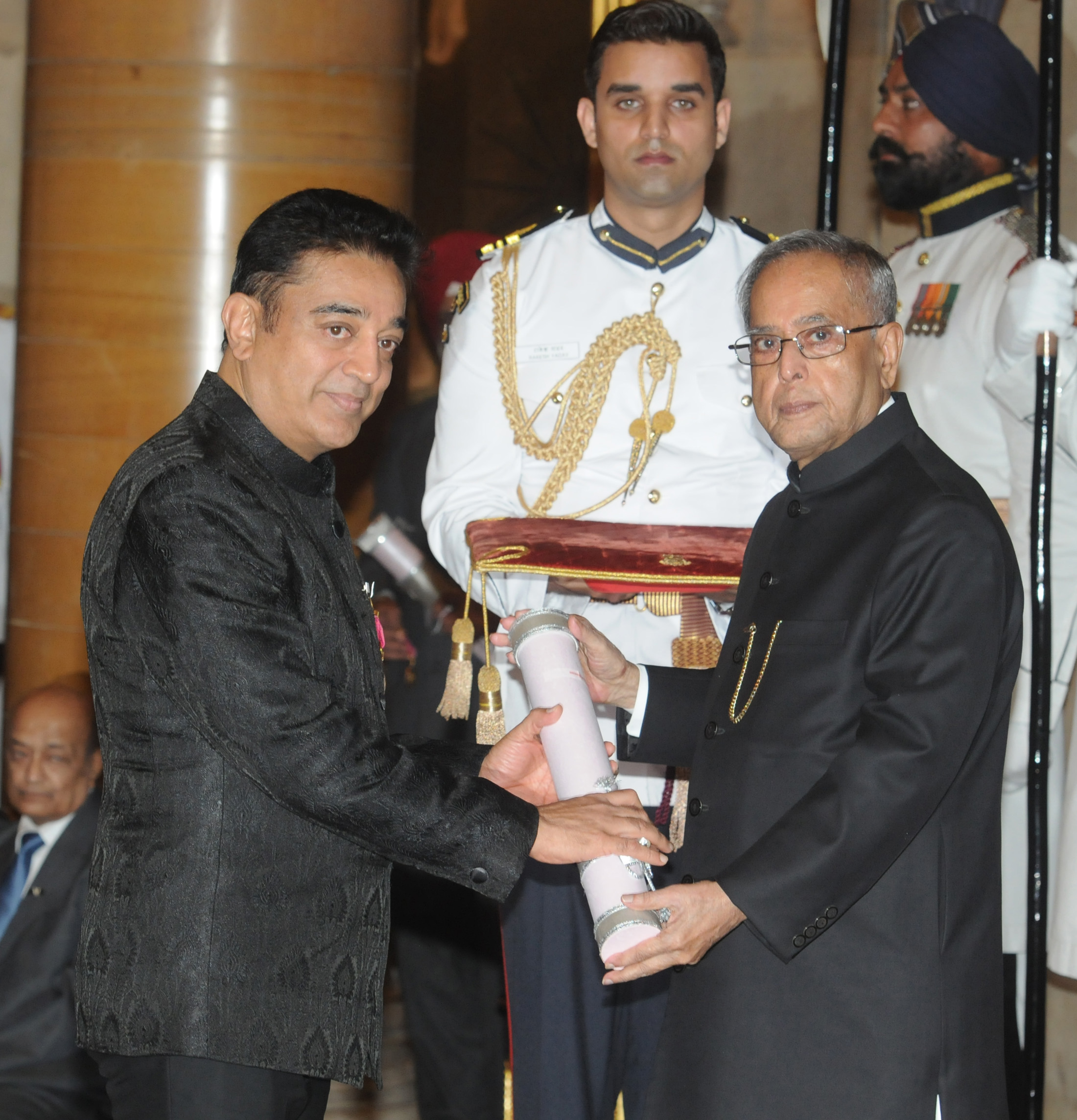
The President of India, Shri Pranab Mukherjee presenting the Padma Bhushan Award to Shri Kamal Haasan, at a Civil Investiture Ceremony, at Rashtrapati Bhavan, in New Delhi on March 31, 2014

Haasan started his career at the age of 5 in the 1960 Tamil film Kalathur Kannamma, which earned him the National Award for Best Child Artist. (Note: The award for best acting was given out as a Rashtrapati Award (President's Gold Medal) until the 14th National Film Awards ceremony held in 1967, when the National Awards were called as the "State Awards for Films". They were renamed to the current National Film Awards from the 15th National Film Awards ceremony held in 1968.) After playing a few supporting roles, he progressed to lead role in the 1974 Malayalam film Kanyakumari, for which he won his first Filmfare Award for Best Actor. He then earned three National Awards for Best Actor for Moondram Pirai (1982), Nayakan (1987) and Indian (1996). Haasan has won 21 Filmfare Awards in total, the most for any actor. He holds the record for the most Filmfare Awards for Best Actor, with a total of 18 wins – eleven in Tamil, three in Telugu, two in Malayalam, one in Hindi, and one in Kannada. (Note: Filmfare Award for Best Actor – Tamil: 1. Apoorva Raagangal (1975); 2. Oru Oodhappu Kan Simittugiradhu (1976); 3. 16 Vayathinile (1977); 4. Sigappu Rojakkal (1978); 5. Raja Paarvai (1981); 6. Gunaa (1991); 7. Thevar Magan (1992); 8. Kuruthipunal (1995); 9. Indian (1996); 10. Hey Ram (2000); 11. Vikram (2022); Filmfare Award for Best Actor – Telugu: 1. Aakali Rajyam (1981); 2. Sagara Sangamam (1983); 3. Indrudu Chandrudu (1989); Filmfare Award for Best Actor – Malayalam: 1. Kanyakumari (1974); 2. Eeta (1978); Filmfare Award for Best Actor – Hindi: Saagar (1985); Filmfare Award for Best Actor – Kannada: Pushpaka Vimana (1987)) He has been nominated for 64 Filmfare Awards, the most for any actor. (Note: 35 nominations for Best Actor – Tamil; 10 nominations for Best Film – Tamil; 2 nominations for Best Director – Tamil; 1 nomination for Best Playback Singer– Tamil; 7 nominations for Best Actor – Telugu; 4 nominations for Best Actor – Hindi; 1 nomination for Best Story – Hindi; 1 nomination for Best Supporting Actor – Hindi; 2 wins for Best Actor – Malayalam; 1 win for Best Actor – Kannada) He also holds the record for the most Filmfare Award nominations for acting, with 50 nominations. He is the only actor who has won Filmfare Awards across five different languages. He won his 18th Filmfare Award for Best Actor for Vikram (2022). (Note: Though Haasan wrote a letter to the organisation asking them to not give him any more awards after his win for Hey Ram (2000), he won his eighteenth Award for Best Actor in a Leading Role (Male) for Vikram (2022) at the 68th Filmfare Awards South 2023 - Tamil.)

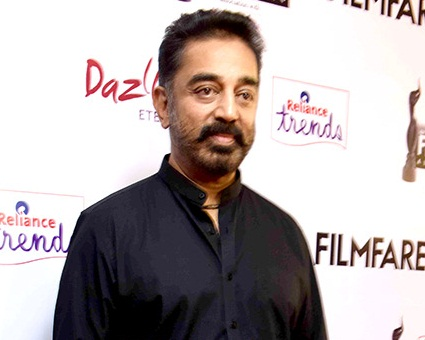
Haasan at the 62nd Filmfare Awards South 2015

Besides several acting awards for his acclaimed performances, (Note: Films for which Haasan won other acting awards (other than National Award and Filmfare Award): 1. For Varumayin Niram Sivappu (1980), Tamil Nadu State Film Award for Best Actor; 2. For Swathi Muthyam (1986), Asia-Pacific Film Festival Award for Best Actor, Nandi Award for Best Actor; 3. For Apoorva Sagodharargal (1989), Tamil Nadu State Film Award for Best Actor; 4. For Chanakyan (1989), Cinema Express Award for Best Actor – Malayalam; 5. For Michael Madana Kama Rajan (1990), Cinema Express Award for Best Actor – Tamil; 6. For Chachi 420 (1997), Zee Cine Award for Best Actor in a Comic Role; 7. For Pammal K. Sambandam (2002), V Shantaram Award for Best Actor – Tamil; 8. For Anbe Sivam (2003), Southern India Cinematographers Association Award for Best Actor; 9. For Vettaiyaadu Vilaiyaadu (2006), Tamil Nadu State Film Award for Best Actor, Film Fans' Association Award for Best Actor; 10. For Dasavathaaram (2008), Tamil Nadu State Film Award for Best Actor, Ananda Vikatan Cinema Award for Best Actor, Vijay Awards for Best Comedian, Best Villain and Favourite Hero, Film Fans' Association Award for Best Actor; 11. For Vishwaroopam (2013), Vijay Award for Best Actor, Behindwoods Gold Medal Award for Legendary Performance as Actor; 12. For Uttama Villain (2015), Los Angeles Independent Film Festival (LAIFF) Award for Best Actor, MGR-SIVAJI Academy Award for Best Actor; 13. For Papanasam (2015), MGR-SIVAJI Academy Award for Best Actor; 14. For Thoongaa Vanam (2015), MGR-SIVAJI Academy Award for Best Actor; 15. For Kalki 2898 AD (2024), South Indian International Movie Award (SIIMA) for Best Actor in a Negative Role – Telugu) he has won many other cinematic awards for producing, directing, screenwriting, singing, lyric writing, choreographing and dancing. (Note: Films for which Haasan won other cinematic awards (other than acting awards): 1. For Apoorva Sagodharargal (1989), Filmfare Award for Best Film – Tamil and Cinema Express Award for Best Film – Tamil; 2. For Thevar Magan (1992), National Film Award for Best Tamil Feature Film, Tamil Nadu State Film Award for Best Feature Film (Second Prize) and Cinema Express Award for Best Film – Tamil; 3. For Kuruthipunal (1995), Cinema Express Award for Best Film – Tamil; 4. For Virasat (1997), Filmfare Award for Best Story – Hindi and Screen Award for Best Story; 5. For Hey Ram (2000), Bengal Film Journalists' Association Award for Most Outstanding Work of the Year; 6. For Virumaandi (2004), Puchon International Fantastic Film Festival (PiFan) Best Asian Film Award; 7. For Dasavathaaram (2008), Ananda Vikatan Cinema Award for Best Screenplay, Vijay Awards for Best Story, Screenplay Writer and Best Dialogue Writer; 8. For Manmadan Ambu (2010), Vijay Music Awards for Best Lyricist and Best Song sung by an Actor (Song: Neela Vaanam); 9. For Vishwaroopam (2013), Vijay Award for Favourite Director, Behindwoods Gold Medal Award for Legendary Performance as Director, Writer, Producer and Singer, Jagran Film Festival Special Jury Award for raising the bar of mainstream Indian cinema to International level; 10. For Uttama Villain (2015), Los Angeles Independent Film Festival (LAIFF) Awards for Best Picture, Best Produced Screenplay and Best Original Song (Song: Iraniyan Naadagam), Behindwoods Gold Medal Award for Best Song Choreographer; 11. For Thoongaa Vanam (2015), MGR-SIVAJI Academy Award for Best Film; 12. For Vikram (2022), South Indian International Movie Award (SIIMA) for Best Playback Singer (Male) – Tamil (Song: Pathala Pathala), Osaka Tamil International Film Festival Award for Best Tamil Film; 13. For Amaran (2024), Filmfare Award for Best Film – Tamil, South Indian International Movie Award (SIIMA) for Best Film – Tamil, Chennai International Film Festival Award for Best Tamil Feature Film; 14. Haasan has also received the Big FM Tamil Entertainment Award for Best Bharatanatyam Dancer) Haasan is also distinguished for starring in the highest number of films submitted by India for Best International Feature Film at the Academy Awards, with seven films – Saagar (1985), Swathi Muthyam (1986), Nayakan (1987), Thevar Magan (1992), Kuruthipunal (1995), Indian (1996), and Hey Ram (2000) which he directed. He has won many awards at various international film festivals, (Note: Haasan's films that were screened at film festivals in countries other than India: 1. Sagara Sangamam (1983) – Asia-Pacific Film Festival, Moscow International Film Festival; 2. Swathi Muthyam (1986) – Asia-Pacific Film Festival, Moscow International Film Festival; 3. Nayakan (1987) – International Film Festival Rotterdam; 4. Pushpaka Vimana (1987) – Cannes Film Festival, International Film Festival Rotterdam, Shanghai International Film Festival; 5. Thevar Magan (1992) – International Film Festival Rotterdam, Toronto International Film Festival; 6. Mahanadhi (1994) – International Film Festival Rotterdam; 7. Kuruthipunal (1995) – International Film Festival Rotterdam; 8. Hey Ram (2000) – International Film Festival Rotterdam, Toronto International Film Festival, Locarno Film Festival; 9. Aalavandhan (2001) – Fantastic Fest; 10. Virumaandi (2004) – International Film Festival Rotterdam, Puchon International Fantastic Film Festival (PiFan); 11. Vishwaroopam (2013) – India International Film Festival of Tampa Bay; 12. Uttama Villain (2015) – Los Angeles Independent Film Festival (LAIFF); 13. Vikram (2022) – Busan International Film Festival, Osaka Tamil International Film Festival; 14. Kalki 2898 AD (2024) – Busan International Film Festival) including the inaugural Best Asian Film Award for his directorial feature Virumaandi (2004) at the Bucheon International Fantastic Film Festival, South Korea. (Note: The European jury of eminent filmmakers said, "Virumaandi successfully manages to combine social and political drama, romance, humour, musical and spectacular action in one story of epic proportions. All the more impressive is the fact that it has been written, produced and directed by one man who also plays the lead role. It is a film that should easily appeal to audiences from all over the world." Jan Doense, filmmaker and a member of the jury gave the award to Haasan and said, "Astounding", even as he appreciated the ethnicity of the film.) Uttama Villain (2015) won six awards, including four for Haasan – Best Picture, Best Actor, Best Screenplay and Best Song at the Los Angeles Independent Film Festival, United States. His production company Raaj Kamal Films International has produced many of his films, including Thevar Magan (1992) for which he won the National Award for Best Tamil Film as a producer. He won his 21st Filmfare Award for producing Amaran (2024), which was also nominated for the prestigious Golden Peacock Award.

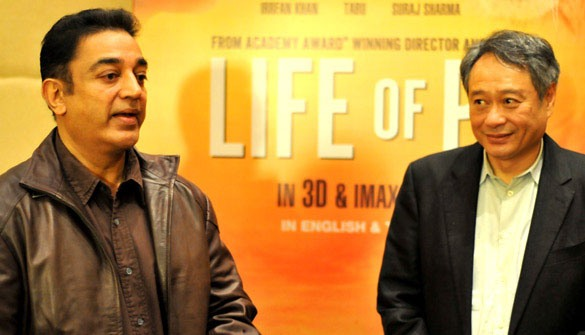
Haasan with Ang Lee

He was honoured with the French honour, Henri Langlois Prize in 2016 and Paidipati Jairaj Award in 2026, for his outstanding contributions to international cinema and Indian cinema respectively. He received the first Golden Beaver Award at the 2025 Indian Film Festival of Alberta, Canada, for "transforming cinema — bridging cultures, breaking barriers, and inspiring audiences worldwide." He was awarded the "Original Pan-India Superstar" Special Award at the 2022 South Indian International Movie Awards. Nayakan (1987) was chosen as one of the 100 greatest films of all time by the American magazine TIME.

"Kamal Haasan falls under a special category, as his cinema broke barriers of language and region. He has been honoured with several awards. In fact, he may be the most awarded person in the country."

— Former Minister of Information and Broadcasting of India, Smt. Ambika Soni

Haasan received the CNN-IBN Indian of the Year Special Award, from the Prime Minister of India, Manmohan Singh, for completing 50 years in cinema in 2009. He was named one of the 50 most powerful Indians by India Today in 2017. He has been conferred two Honorary Doctorates, one by Sathyabama University in 2005, one by Centurion University in 2019. He received the first A. T. Kovoor National Award for the Secular Artist in 2005, in acknowledgment of his humanist and philanthropic activities.

== Civilian honours ==
No.	Image	Ribbon	Decoration	Field	Conferred year	Presented by
1			Padma Shri (Fourth Highest Civilian Award of India)	Arts	1990	Government of India
2.			Padma Bhushan (Third Highest Civilian Award of India)	Arts	2014	President of India
3.			Chevalier de L'Ordre des Arts et des Lettres (The Knight of the Order of Arts and Letters)	Arts	2016	Ministry of Culture (France)

== Government honours ==
Kamal Haasan has also been honoured by State governments of India.

- In 1978, the Government of Tamil Nadu honoured Haasan with the Kalaimamani (transl. Jewel of Arts), for his excellent service to the development of arts.
- In 2010, Haasan was honoured by the Chief Minister of Kerala, V. S. Achuthanandan, for his 50 years in Indian cinema, during the inauguration of Onam celebrations organised by the Government of Kerala.
- In 2011, Haasan was honoured by the Income Tax Department for being "a shining example of good citizenship by paying his taxes on a regular basis," and was presented a certificate by the Governor of Tamil Nadu, Surjit Singh Barnala.

== Film awards ==
=== National Film Awards ===
Established in 1954, the National Awards are the most prominent awards for films in India. They are awarded by the President of India each year for the films of the preceding year. Kamal Haasan has won five National Awards, including four for acting, and one as a producer.

Year	Film	Category	Result	Ref.
1960	Kalathur Kannamma	Best Child Artist	Won	(Note: The award for best acting was given out as a Rashtrapati Award (President's Gold Medal) until the 14th National Film Awards ceremony held in 1967, when the National Awards were called as the "State Awards for Films". They were renamed to the current National Film Awards from the 15th National Film Awards ceremony held in 1968.)
1982	Moondram Pirai	Best Actor	Won	
1987	Nayakan	Best Actor	Won	
1992	Thevar Magan	Best Tamil Film	Won	
1996	Indian	Best Actor	Won	

=== Filmfare Awards ===
Kamal Haasan has won 21 Filmfare Awards in total, the most for any actor –– category-wise: 18 for Best Actor, 2 for Best Film, and 1 for Best Story; language-wise: 13 in Tamil, 3 in Telugu, 2 in Malayalam, 2 in Hindi, and 1 in Kannada.

He holds the record for the most Filmfare Awards for Best Actor, with a total of 18 wins –– 11 in Tamil, 3 in Telugu, 2 in Malayalam, 1 in Hindi, and 1 in Kannada. (Note: Filmfare Award for Best Actor – Tamil: 1. Apoorva Raagangal (1975); 2. Oru Oodhappu Kan Simittugiradhu (1976); 3. 16 Vayathinile (1977); 4. Sigappu Rojakkal (1978); 5. Raja Paarvai (1981); 6. Gunaa (1991); 7. Thevar Magan (1992); 8. Kuruthipunal (1995); 9. Indian (1996); 10. Hey Ram (2000); 11. Vikram (2022); Filmfare Award for Best Actor – Telugu: 1. Aakali Rajyam (1981); 2. Sagara Sangamam (1983); 3. Indrudu Chandrudu (1989); Filmfare Award for Best Actor – Malayalam: 1. Kanyakumari (1974); 2. Eeta (1978); Filmfare Award for Best Actor – Hindi: Saagar (1985); Filmfare Award for Best Actor – Kannada: Pushpaka Vimana (1987))

He has been nominated for 64 Filmfare Awards, the most for any actor –– category-wise: 49 for Best Actor, 10 for Best Film, 2 for Best Director, 1 for Best Playback Singer, 1 for Best Story, 1 for Best Supporting Actor; language-wise: 48 in Tamil, 7 in Telugu, 6 in Hindi, 2 in Malayalam, 1 in Kannada.

He also holds the record for the most Filmfare Award nominations for acting, with 50 nominations –– category-wise: 49 for Best Actor, 1 for Best Supporting Actor; language-wise: 35 in Tamil, 7 in Telugu, 5 in Hindi, 2 in Malayalam, 1 in Kannada.

Haasan is the only actor who has won Filmfare Awards across five different languages.

He holds the record for the most Filmfare Awards for Best Actor – Tamil, with a total of 11 wins.

He also holds the record for the most Filmfare Award nominations for Best Actor – Tamil, with 35 nominations.

He holds the record for the most consecutive wins of the Filmfare Award for Best Actor – Tamil, with 4 wins from 1975 to 1978.

He also holds the record for the most consecutive Filmfare Award nominations for Best Actor – Tamil, with 12 nominations from 1985 to 1996.

He remains the youngest nominee and winner of the Filmfare Award for Best Actor – Malayalam, winning at the age of 20.

He also remains the youngest nominee and winner of the Filmfare Award for Best Actor – Tamil, winning at the age of 21.

Though Haasan wrote a letter to the organisation asking them to not give him any more awards after his win for Hey Ram (2000), he won his 18th Filmfare Award for Best Actor for Vikram (2022), and his 21st Filmfare Award overall for Amaran (2024) as a producer.

Table
Year	Film	Category	Result	Ref.
1974	Kanyakumari	Best Actor - Malayalam	Won	
1975	Apoorva Raagangal	Best Actor - Tamil	Won	
1976	Oru Oodhappu Kan Simittugiradhu	Best Actor - Tamil	Won	
1977	Avargal	Best Actor - Tamil	Nominated	
1977	16 Vayathinile	Best Actor - Tamil	Won	
1978	Maro Charitra	Best Actor - Telugu	Nominated	
1978	Ilamai Oonjal Aadukirathu	Best Actor - Tamil	Nominated	
1978	Sigappu Rojakkal	Best Actor - Tamil	Won	
1978	Eeta	Best Actor - Malayalam	Won	
1979	Ninaithale Inikkum	Best Actor - Tamil	Nominated	
1980	Varumayin Niram Sivappu	Best Actor - Tamil	Nominated	
1981	Aakali Rajyam	Best Actor - Telugu	Won	
1981	Raja Paarvai	Best Actor - Tamil	Won	
1981	Raja Paarvai	Best Film - Tamil	Nominated	
1981	Ek Duuje Ke Liye	Best Actor - Hindi	Nominated	
1982	Vaazhvey Maayam	Best Actor - Tamil	Nominated	
1982	Moondram Pirai	Best Actor - Tamil	Nominated	
1983	Sagara Sangamam	Best Actor - Telugu	Won	
1983	Sadma	Best Actor - Hindi	Nominated	
1985	Oru Kaidhiyin Diary	Best Actor - Tamil	Nominated	
1985	Saagar	Best Actor - Hindi	Won	
1985	Saagar	Best Supporting Actor - Hindi	Nominated	
1986	Swathi Muthyam	Best Actor - Telugu	Nominated	
1986	Punnagai Mannan	Best Actor - Tamil	Nominated	
1987	Nayakan	Best Actor - Tamil	Nominated	
1987	Pushpaka Vimana	Best Actor - Kannada	Won	
1988	Sathyaa	Best Film - Tamil	Nominated	
1988	Unnal Mudiyum Thambi	Best Actor - Tamil	Nominated	
1989	Apoorva Sagodharargal	Best Actor - Tamil	Nominated	
1989	Apoorva Sagodharargal	Best Film - Tamil	Won	
1989	Indrudu Chandrudu	Best Actor - Telugu	Won	
1990	Michael Madana Kama Rajan	Best Actor - Tamil	Nominated	
1991	Gunaa	Best Actor - Tamil	Won	
1992	Thevar Magan	Best Actor - Tamil	Won	
1992	Thevar Magan	Best Film - Tamil	Nominated	
1993	Kalaignan	Best Actor - Tamil	Nominated	
1994	Mahanadhi	Best Actor - Tamil	Nominated	
1994	Magalir Mattum	Best Film - Tamil	Nominated	
1995	Sathi Leelavathi	Best Film - Tamil	Nominated	
1995	Subha Sankalpam	Best Actor - Telugu	Nominated	
1995	Kuruthipunal	Best Actor - Tamil	Won	
1996	Indian	Best Actor - Tamil	Won	
1996	Avvai Shanmugi	Best Actor - Tamil	Nominated	
1997	Virasat	Best Story - Hindi	Won	
1997	Chachi 420	Best Actor - Hindi	Nominated	
2000	Hey Ram	Best Actor - Tamil	Won	
2000	Hey Ram	Best Director - Tamil	Nominated	
2000	Hey Ram	Best Film - Tamil	Nominated	
2001	Aalavandhan	Best Actor - Tamil	Nominated	
2002	Panchatanthiram	Best Actor - Tamil	Nominated	
2003	Anbe Sivam	Best Actor - Tamil	Nominated	
2004	Vasool Raja MBBS	Best Actor - Tamil	Nominated	
2006	Vettaiyaadu Vilaiyaadu	Best Actor - Tamil	Nominated	
2008	Dasavathaaram	Best Actor - Tamil	Nominated	
2009	Eenadu	Best Actor - Telugu	Nominated	
2009	Unnaipol Oruvan	Best Actor - Tamil	Nominated	
2013	Vishwaroopam	Best Actor - Tamil	Nominated	
2013	Vishwaroopam	Best Director - Tamil	Nominated	
2013	Vishwaroopam	Best Film - Tamil	Nominated	
2015	Papanasam	Best Actor - Tamil	Nominated	
2022	Vikram	Best Actor - Tamil	Won	
2022	Vikram	Best Film - Tamil	Nominated	
2022	Vikram	Best Playback Singer - Tamil	Nominated	
2024	Amaran	Best Film - Tamil	Won	

=== Tamil Nadu State Film Awards ===
Awards for Tamil films, awarded by the Government of Tamil Nadu. Haasan holds the record for the most Tamil Nadu State Film Awards, with a total of 11 wins. He also holds the record for the most Tamil Nadu State Film Awards for Best Actor, with a total of 8 wins.

Year	Film	Category	Result	Ref.
1977	16 Vayathinile	Best Actor	Won	
1980	Varumayin Niram Sivappu	Best Actor	Won	
1982	Moondram Pirai	Best Actor	Won	
1989	Apoorva Sagodharargal	Best Actor	Won	
1992	Thevar Magan	Best Actor	Won	
1992	Thevar Magan	Best Feature Film (Second Prize)	Won	
1996	Indian	Best Actor	Won	
2006	Vettaiyaadu Vilaiyaadu	Best Actor	Won	
2008	Dasavathaaram	Best Actor	Won	
1989	MGR Award for Contributions to the development of Tamil cinema		Won	
1999	Sivaji Ganesan Award for Contributions to the development of Tamil cinema		Won	

=== Nandi Awards ===
Awards for Telugu films, awarded by the Government of Andhra Pradesh.

Year	Film	Category	Result	Ref.
1983	Sagara Sangamam	Best Actor	Won	
1986	Swathi Muthyam	Best Actor	Won	
1989	Indrudu Chandrudu	Best Actor	Won	
2014	NTR National Award for Lifetime achievements and contributions to Indian cinema		Won	
2026	Paidipati Jairaj Award for Outstanding contributions to the growth and development of Indian cinema		Won	(Note: given as Telangana Gaddar Film Awards from 2025 by the Government of Telangana)

=== South Indian International Movie Awards ===
Awards for South Indian films.

Year	Film	Category	Result	Ref.
2013	Vishwaroopam	Best Actor - Tamil	Nominated	
2013	Vishwaroopam	Best Director - Tamil	Nominated	
2013	Vishwaroopam	Best Film - Tamil	Nominated	
2022	Vikram	Best Actor - Tamil	Won	
2022	Vikram	Best Film - Tamil	Nominated	
2022	Vikram	Best Playback Singer - Tamil	Won	
2024	Kalki 2898 AD	Best Actor in a Negative Role - Telugu	Won	
2024	Amaran	Best Film - Tamil	Won	
2022	Original Pan-India Superstar (Special Award)		Won	

=== Ananda Vikatan Cinema Awards ===
Year	Film	Category	Result	Ref.
2008	Dasavathaaram	Best Actor	Won	
2008	Dasavathaaram	Best Screenplay	Won	
2022	Vikram	Best Actor	Won	
2022	Vikram	Best Crew	Won	
2024	Meiyazhagan	Best Playback Singer	Nominated	
2024	Amaran	Best Movie	Nominated	
2016	S. S. Vasan Award (for Lifetime Achievements)		Won	

=== Vijay Awards ===
Year	Film	Category	Result	Ref.
2008	Dasavathaaram	Best Actor	Nominated	
2008	Dasavathaaram	Best Comedian	Won	
2008	Dasavathaaram	Best Dialogue Writer	Won	
2008	Dasavathaaram	Best Story, Screenplay Writer	Won	
2008	Dasavathaaram	Best Villain	Won	
2008	Dasavathaaram	Favourite Hero	Won	
2009	Unnaipol Oruvan	Best Actor	Nominated	
2009	Unnaipol Oruvan	Favourite Hero	Nominated	
2010	Manmadan Ambu	Favourite Hero	Nominated	
2013	Vishwaroopam	Best Actor	Won	
2013	Vishwaroopam	Best Director	Nominated	
2013	Vishwaroopam	Best Playback Singer	Nominated	
2013	Vishwaroopam	Favourite Director	Won	
2013	Vishwaroopam	Favourite Film	Nominated	
2013	Vishwaroopam	Favourite Hero	Nominated	
2006	Chevalier Sivaji Ganesan Award (for Excellence in Cinema)		Won	

=== Vijay Music Awards ===
Year	Film	Category	Result	Ref.
2010	Manmadan Ambu	Best Lyricist	Won	
2010	Manmadan Ambu	Best Song sung by an Actor	Won	

=== Cinema Express Awards ===
Year	Film	Category	Result	Ref.
1981	Raja Paarvai	Best Actor - Tamil	Won	
1982	Moondram Pirai	Best Actor - Tamil	Won	
1986	Swathi Muthyam	Best Actor - Telugu	Won	
1987	Nayakan	Best Actor - Tamil	Won	
1989	Apoorva Sagodharargal	Best Actor - Tamil	Won	
1989	Apoorva Sagodharargal	Best Film - Tamil	Won	
1989	Chanakyan	Best Actor - Malayalam	Won	
1990	Michael Madana Kama Rajan	Best Actor - Tamil	Won	
1991	Gunaa	Best Actor - Tamil (Special Award)	Won	
1992	Thevar Magan	Best Actor - Tamil	Won	
1992	Thevar Magan	Best Film - Tamil	Won	
1995	Kuruthipunal	Best Film - Tamil	Won	
1996	Indian	Best Actor - Tamil	Won	

=== Zee Cine Awards ===
Year	Film	Category	Result	Ref.
1997	Chachi 420	Best Actor	Nominated	
1997	Chachi 420	Best Actor in a Comic Role	Won	
2020	Pride of Indian Cinema (Special Award)		Won	

=== Screen Awards ===
Year	Film	Category	Result	Ref.
1997	Virasat	Best Story	Won	

=== Bengal Film Journalists' Association Awards ===
Year	Film	Category	Result	Ref.
1985	Saagar	Best Supporting Actor - Hindi	Won	
2000	Hey Ram	Most Outstanding Work of the Year	Won	

=== Other Film Awards ===
==== V Shantaram Awards ====
Also called Rajkamal Academy of Cinematic Excellence National Awards.

Year	Film	Category	Result	Ref.
2002	Pammal K. Sambandam	Best Actor - Tamil	Won	
2008	Dasavathaaram	Best Actor	Nominated	

==== Behindwoods Gold Medals ====
Year	Film	Category	Result	Ref.
2013	Vishwaroopam	Legendary Performance	Won	(Note: Legendary Performance as Actor, Director, Writer, Producer and Singer)
2015	Uttama Villain	Best Song Choreographer	Won	
2015	K Balachander Gold Medal (for Excellence in Indian cinema)		Won	

==== MGR-SIVAJI Academy Awards ====
Year	Film	Category	Result	Ref.
2015	Uttama Villain	Best Actor	Won	
2015	Papanasam	Best Actor	Won	
2015	Thoongaa Vanam	Best Actor	Won	
2015	Thoongaa Vanam	Best Film	Won	

==== Southern India Cinematographers Association Awards ====
Year	Film	Category	Result	Ref.
2003	Anbe Sivam	Best Actor	Won	
2015	Lifetime Achievement Award		Won	

==== Film Fans' Association Awards ====
Year	Film	Category	Result	Ref.
2006	Vettaiyaadu Vilaiyaadu	Best Actor	Won	
2008	Dasavathaaram	Best Actor	Won	

- In 2000, the Government of West Bengal felicitated Haasan for his film Hey Ram, which was also screened during a function organised by the West Bengal Sports Council at the Netaji Indoor Stadium, Kolkata.
- Haasan received a "tribute memento" from the Embassy of France in India, for shooting the film Manmadan Ambu (2010) in France.

=== Film Festival Awards ===
==== Bucheon International Fantastic Film Festival ====
Year	Film	Category	Result	Ref.
2004	Virumaandi	Best Asian Film	Won	

The European jury of eminent filmmakers said, "Virumaandi successfully manages to combine social and political drama, romance, humour, musical and spectacular action in one story of epic proportions. All the more impressive is the fact that it has been written, produced and directed by one man who also plays the lead role. It is a film that should easily appeal to audiences from all over the world." Jan Doense, filmmaker and a member of the jury gave the Best Asian Film Award to Kamal Haasan and said, "Astounding", even as he appreciated the ethnicity of the film.

==== Asia-Pacific Film Festival ====
Year	Film	Category	Result	Ref.
1983	Sagara Sangamam	Best Actor	Won	
1986	Swathi Muthyam	Best Actor	Won	

==== International Film Festival Rotterdam ====
Year	Film	Category	Result	Ref.
1987	Nayakan	Filmmaker Focus	Won	
1987	Pushpaka Vimana	Filmmaker Focus	Won	
1992	Thevar Magan	Filmmaker Focus	Won	
1994	Mahanadhi	Filmmaker Focus	Won	
1995	Kuruthipunal	Filmmaker Focus	Won	
2000	Hey Ram	Filmmaker Focus	Won	

==== Los Angeles Independent Film Festival ====
Year	Film	Category	Result	Ref.
2015	Uttama Villain	Best Actor	Won	
2015	Uttama Villain	Best Original Song	Won	
2015	Uttama Villain	Best Picture	Won	
2015	Uttama Villain	Best Produced Screenplay	Won	

==== Osaka Tamil International Film Festival ====
Year	Film	Category	Result	Ref.
2022	Vikram	Best Actor	Won	
2022	Vikram	Best Tamil Film	Won	

==== Jagran Film Festival ====
Special Jury Award for raising the bar of mainstream Indian cinema to International level.

Year	Film	Category	Result	Ref.
2013	Vishwaroopam	Special Jury Award	Won	

==== Chennai International Film Festival ====
Year	Film	Category	Result	Ref.
2024	Amaran	Best Tamil Film	Won	

==== International Film Festival of India ====
Year	Film	Category	Result	Ref.
2024	Amaran	Golden Peacock for Best Feature Film	Nominated	

==== Habitat Film Festival ====
Year	Film	Category	Result	Ref.
1981	Ek Duuje Ke Liye	Filmmaker Retrospective	Won	
1983	Sadma	Filmmaker Retrospective	Won	
1985	Saagar	Filmmaker Retrospective	Won	
1987	Nayakan	Filmmaker Retrospective	Won	
1991	Gunaa	Filmmaker Retrospective	Won	
1996	Indian	Filmmaker Retrospective	Won	
1997	Chachi 420	Filmmaker Retrospective	Won	
2000	Hey Ram	Filmmaker Retrospective	Won	
2004	Virumaandi	Filmmaker Retrospective	Won	
2013	Vishwaroop	Filmmaker Retrospective	Won	

==== Kamal Haasan Film Festival ====
The Directorate of Film Festivals organised a three-day "Kamal Haasan Film Festival" from 2 to 4 July 2010, presided over by the Minister of Information and Broadcasting of India, Smt. Ambika Soni, and showcased seven of his best films, including Dasavathaaram (2008) in which he played ten distinct roles.

Year	Film	Category	Result	Ref.
1983	Sagara Sangamam	Filmmaker Retrospective	Won	
1987	Nayakan	Filmmaker Retrospective	Won	
1992	Thevar Magan	Filmmaker Retrospective	Won	
2000	Hey Ram	Filmmaker Retrospective	Won	
2003	Anbe Sivam	Filmmaker Retrospective	Won	
2004	Virumaandi	Filmmaker Retrospective	Won	
2008	Dasavathaaram	Filmmaker Retrospective	Won	

== Other honours ==
Haasan is distinguished for starring in the highest number of films submitted by India for Best International Feature Film at the Academy Awards, with seven films including Hey Ram (2000) which he directed:

- Saagar (1985)
- Swathi Muthyam (1986)
- Nayakan (1987)
- Thevar Magan (1992)
- Kuruthipunal (1995)
- Indian (1996)
- Hey Ram (2000)

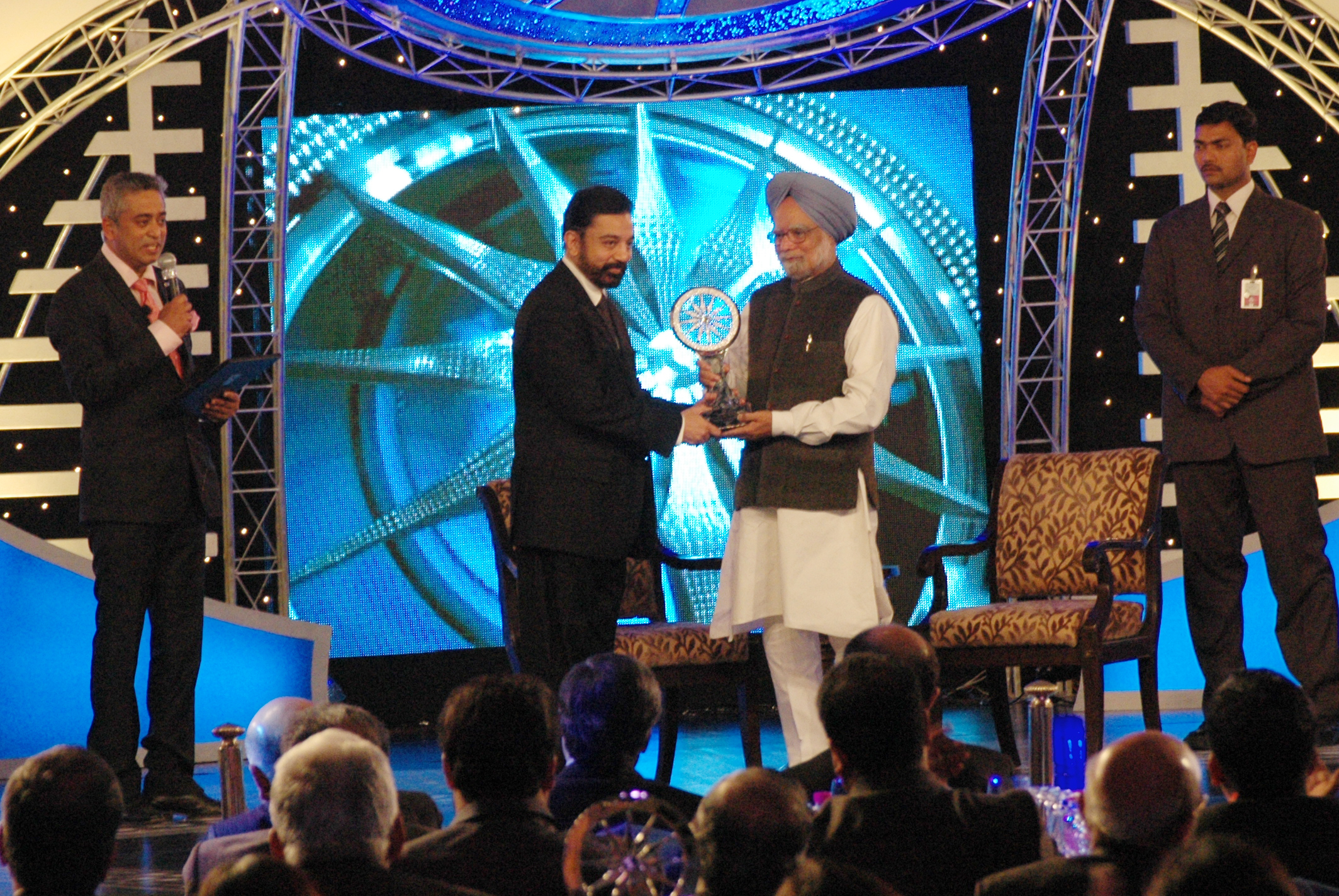
The Prime Minister of India, Shri Manmohan Singh presenting the CNN-IBN Indian of the Year Special Award to Shri Kamal Haasan, for completing 50 years in cinema, in New Delhi on December 21, 2009

- Haasan was conferred two Honorary Doctorates, one by Sathyabama University in 2005, one by Centurion University in 2019.
- Haasan received the CNN-IBN Indian of the Year Special Award, from the Prime Minister of India, Manmohan Singh, for completing 50 years in cinema in 2009.
- Haasan was appointed an ambassador by the United Nations in 2007, for its joint campaign with the Tamil Nadu State AIDS Control Society to protect the rights of people living with HIV.
- Haasan was ranked the 2nd biggest and most famous Indian actor of all time by the British magazine Time Out in 2025.
- Haasan was awarded the Henri Langlois Prize in 2016, a French honour, for his contributions to international cinema.
- Haasan's portrayal of an innocent man, scammed and imprisoned, in Mahanadhi (1994), was selected by Forbes India as one of the 25 greatest acting performances of Indian cinema.
- Nayakan (1987) was chosen as one of the 100 greatest films of all time by the American magazine Time.
- Anbe Sivam (2003) was selected as one of the 25 best Indian movies of the 21st century by The Hollywood Reporter India.
- Haasan was invited by the Academy of Motion Picture Arts and Sciences in 2025 to become a member of its Actors Branch, for being an "exceptionally talented individual having made indelible contributions to global filmmaking community."
- Haasan received the first Golden Beaver Award for "transforming cinema — bridging cultures, breaking barriers, and inspiring audiences worldwide" at the Indian Film Festival of Alberta, Canada (2025).
- Nayakan (1987) was ranked the 45th best Bollywood movie by the British magazine Time Out.
- Nayakan (1987) was ranked the 13th greatest Indian film by NDTV.
- Haasan was one of 20 Indian cinematic icons, whose extraordinary achievements were acknowledged in the 24th edition of the Limca Book of Records (2013).
- Haasan was the first Indian actor invited aboard an American ship, as a special friend of the United States in 2012.
- Haasan received the first A. T. Kovoor National Award for the Secular Artist in 2005, in acknowledgment of his humanist and philanthropic activities.
- Nayakan (1987) was ranked the 82nd greatest film of all time by the American magazine The Moving Arts Film Journal.
- Haasan was named as one of the 50 most powerful Indians by India Today magazine in 2017.
- Haasan became the first South Indian actor to speak at the Harvard University, United States in 2016.
- Haasan was awarded the Mirchi Music Special Award for Outstanding Contribution to Music (2014).
- Haasan was honoured with the Maestro Award for lifetime achievement by Whistling Woods International in 2014.
- Haasan received the Living Legend Award from the Federation of Indian Chambers of Commerce & Industry in 2007.
- On October 16, 1997, Queen Elizabeth II publicly launched Haasan's unfinished historical film Marudhanayagam.
- Haasan was honoured with the Outstanding Contribution to Indian Cinema Award by the Indian National Cine Academy in 2026.

Seven films, starring Haasan, were selected as among the 100 greatest Indian films of all time by CNN-News18:

- Ek Duuje Ke Liye (1981)
- Pushpaka Vimana (1987)
- Sagara Sangamam (1983)
- Maro Charitra (1978)
- Nayakan (1987)
- Aval Appadithan (1978)
- 16 Vayathinile (1977)

=== Asianet Film Awards ===
The Asianet Film Awards are presented by Asianet, a Malayalam language television channel in the Indian state of Kerala. The award ceremony has been held annually since 1998.

Year	Artist	Category	Result	Ref.
2009	Kamal Haasan	Special Jury Award	Won	
2012	Kamal Haasan	Popular Tamil Actor	Won	
2013	Kamal Haasan	Popular Tamil Actor	Won	

=== Kerala Film Critics Association Awards ===
Year	Film	Language	Category	Result	Ref.
2022	Contribution for Film Industry	Tamil	Ruby Jubilee Award	Won	

=== IIFA Awards ( International Indian Film Academy Awards) ===
Outstanding Achievement in Indian Cinema

Year	Category	Result	Ref.
2022	Outstanding Achievement in Indian Cinema	Won	

=== Soman Lifetime Achievement Award ===
Kamal Haasan was awarded the Soman Lifetime Achievement Award by the M. G. Soman Foundation for his cinema and philanthropic activities.

Year	Award	Honouring body	Result	Ref.
2022	Soman Lifetime Achievement Award	M. G. Soman Foundation	Won	

=== Tamil Chamber of Commerce ===
On 2 August 2014, actor Kamal Haasan was presented with Lifetime Achievement Award by Chief guest Governor Dr. K. Rosaiah at a function organised by Tamil Chamber of Commerce as part of its 70th anniversary celebrations.

Year	Award	Honouring body	Result	Ref.
2014	Lifetime Achievement Award	The Tamil Chamber of Commerce	Won	

=== Hindustan Times ===
Kamal Haasan was presented with Hall of Fame award by Hindustan Times at HT India's Most Stylish Awards 2013.

Year	Award	Honouring body	Result	Ref.
2013	Hall of Fame	Hindustan Times	Won	

=== Puthiya Thalaimurai TV ===
Kamal Haasan was presented with Lifetime Achievement Award by Puthiya Thalaimurai TV at Puthiya Thalaimurai Tamizhan Award function in 2013.

Year	Award	Honouring body	Result	Ref.
2013	Lifetime Achievement Award	Puthiya Thalaimurai TV	Won	

=== Outlook Social Media Awards ===
Kamal Haasan was presented with Man of the year 2018 by Outlook Social Media Groups.

Year	Award	Honouring body	Result	Ref.
2018	Supernova of the year	Outlook	Won	

=== Viswa Kala Bharathi Award ===
Kamal Haasan was presented with Viswa Kala Bharathi Excellence Dance in Tamil Cinama 2009 by Bharat Kalachar, Chennai.

Year	Award	Honouring body	Result	Ref.
2009	Viswa Kala Bharathi	The Bharat Kalachar	Won	

=== Eenam Swaralaya Awards ===
Kamal Haasan was presented with Eenam Swaralaya Bharat Murali Award in 2016 by Eenam Swaralaya International Cultural Organization, Kerala.

Year	Award	Honouring body	Result	Ref.
2016	Eenam Swaralaya Bharat Murali Award	Eenam Swaralaya International Cultural Organization	Won	

=== Galatta Nakshatra Awards ===
Kamal Haasan receives Game Changer of the Year 2018 award.

Year	Award	Honouring body	Result	Ref.
2018	Game Changer of the Year	Galatta Tamil	Won	

=== Most Talented Hero Award (Since 1991–2005) ===
Kamal Haasan receives Most Talented Hero Award, India Today - Conducted Open Public Survey about Tamil Film Industries (1991-2005) at 2006 .

Year	Award	Honouring body	Result	Ref.
1991-2005	Most Talented Hero Award	India Today	Won	

=== BIG FM Tamil Entertainment Awards ===
Kamal Haasan was presented with Best Entertaining Bharatanatyam Dancer 2011 by BIG FM.

Year	Award	Honouring body	Result	Ref.
2011	Best Entertaining Bharatanatyam Dancer	BIG FM	Won	

=== Contemporary Living Legend of Year 2007 Award ===
A Mumbai based UFO Digital Cinema Company has selected Kamal haasan for the Contemporary Living Legend of Year 2007 award.

Year	Award	Honouring body	Result	Ref.
2007	Contemporary living legend of year	UFO Digital Cinema Company, Mumbai	Won	

=== Rashtrabhushan Award ===
Kamal Haasan was presented with Rashtrabhushan Award by FIE Foundation.

The FIE Foundation is a charity trust (NGO) established in 1970, belongs to 'Fie Group of Industries' Ichalkaranji, in Maharashtra State of India. The awards are generally selected form the following fields,- Engineering, Science & Technology, Humanities, Education, Agriculture, Music & Arts, Sports, Literature, Child Artist and Local talents. The highest award conferred is 'Rashtrabhushan Awards'. The awards are given every year in a grand ceremony held in Ichalkaranji in January/February at the hands of eminent dignitaries.

Year	Award	Honouring body	Result	Ref.
2007	Rastrabhushan Award	FIE Foundation	Won	

=== Rotary Club of Madras Award ===
Kamal Haasan was presented with Lifetime Achievement Award by Rotary Club of Madras.

Year	Award	Honouring body	Result	Ref.
2009–10	Lifetime Achievement Award	Rotary Club of Madras	Won	

=== Shifa Al Jazeera Excellence Award ===
Kamal Haasan was presented with Shifa Al Jazeera Excellence Award by Shifa Al Jazeera Medical Group, Bahrain.

Year	Award	Honouring body	Outcome	Ref.
2014	Shifa Al Jazeera Excellence Award	Shifa Al Jazeera Medical Group, Bahrain	Won	

=== India Retail Excellence Awards ===
Kamal Haasan was presented with RAI Award at India Retail Excellence Awards, 2019 by Retailers Association of India.

Year	Award	Honouring body	Outcome	Ref.
2019	The Legend of Indian Cinema Award	Retailers Association of India (RAI)	Won	

=== ATMA National Award (Tobacco Awareness) ===
Kamal Haasan was presented with ATMA Award by Amrita Hospitals & Medical Group, India.

Year	Ceremony	Category	Outcome	Ref.
2003	Amrita Hospitals & Medical Group, India	ATMA Award	Won	

=== Asian Television Award ===
Haasan was nominated in Best Entertainment Presenter / Host award at 2019 Asian Television Awards.

Year	Show	Category	Outcome	Ref.
2019	Bigg Boss Tamil 2	Best Host	Nominated	

=== Mumbai International Film Festival ===
Year	Ceremony	Category	Outcome	Ref.
2013	15th Mumbai International Film Festival	Lifetime Achievement Award	Won	

=== Norway Tamil Film Festival Awards ===
Kamal Haasan was presented with Lifetime Achievement Award by NTFF (Norway Tamil Film Festival).

Year	Ceremony	Category	Outcome	Ref.
2016	7th Norway Tamil Film Festival	Lifetime Achievement Award	Won	

=== London Indian Film Festival ===
Kamal Haasan was presented with Lifetime Achievement Award at Liff (London Indian Film Festival) by BAGRI Foundation.

Year	Ceremony	Category	Outcome	Ref.
2016	7th London Indian Film Festival	Outstanding Contribution in Indian Cinema Award	Won	

=== New York Festivals International Film & TV Awards ===
Mr. Haasan will receive an award on behalf of the Indian cinema presented by Chris Brown, Executive Vice President, Conventions & Business Operations for the National Association of Broadcasters. The ceremony is part of the New York Festivals International Film & TV awards.

Year	Ceremony	Category	Outcome	Ref.
2013	New York Festivals International Film & TV awards	Represent in Indian Cinema Award	Won	

- 2013 CNN-IBN survey on "100 years of Indian cinema" – 2nd position as India's Great Actors. (First-NTR 53 percentage, Second-Kamal 44 percentage)
- Haasan was honoured in India House at London in UK-India Year of Culture 2017.
- Haasan was honoured in Grand Marshal in 38th India Day Parade at Manhattan, New York in 2018.
- The 67th Cannes Film Festival, which was held from 14 May 2014, comprised a showcase Indian cinema across linguistic, cultural and regional diversity, with the aim of forging international partnerships in the realms of distribution, production, filming in India, script development and technology, and promoting film sales and syndication", according to an official press note.
- 2003 – Actor Kamal Haasan had been selected as the 'Guest of Honour' for the 34th International Film Festival of India, 9 October, Delhi.
- 2013 – He inaugurated the 6th Bengaluru International Film Festival of India in Karnataka.
- 2013 – He inaugurated the 11th Chennai International Film Festival of India in Tamil Nadu.
- 2013– He inaugurated the 19th Kolkata International Film Festival (KIFF).
- 2013 – He inaugurated the 44th International Film Festival of India, Goa.
- 2007– He inaugurated the 12th International Film Festival of Kerala.
- 2016– He was invited 'Chief Guest Speaker' Wharton India Economic Forum (WIEF), Philadelphia, 20th Edition of the Conference, 26 March 2016.
- Actor-filmmaker Kamal Haasan, in association with the All India Film Employees Confederation (AIFEC), had organised a three-day film workshop in November, 2015 for over 10,000 people working in the industry.
- He is one of the board member of Censor Board of Film Certification.
- Kamal Haasan, in association with the Indian Institute of Technology- Madras (IIT-M) presented a first-of-its-kind International Workshop and Seminar on Screenwriting in the IIT campus in Chennai from 29 May to 3 June 2009.

== See also ==
- Kamal Haasan filmography
- Kamal Haasan discography

== Bibliography ==
- K. Hariharan (10 July 2024). Kamal Haasan: A Cinematic Journey (1st ed.). HarperCollins Publishers India. 280 pages. ISBN 9789354899621. "One of the greatest actors India has ever produced, Kamal Haasan is unique in many ways. He has usually gone beyond just enacting a role to completely immersing himself in it."
- Sadhanaigal padaitha Tamil Thiraipada Varalaaru (Tamil Film History and Its Achievements) (in Tamil). Chennai: Sivagami Publications. 2004.
- The Times of India directory and year book including who's who. The Times of India. 1984.
- Super Actor Kamal Hasan Vaizhkai Varalaaru, 2nd Edition, 1993 (1st 1985). MANIMEKALAI PRASURAM, Post Box No. 1477, Thanigasalam Road, T Nagar, Chennai.
- Actor Kamal Hasan Vaizhkai Varalaaru, 2001 (Monthly Twice). Cinema Express Tamil Magazine.
- Nammavar Kamal Haasan Narpani Kalangium, Pondicherry Branch, 1st Edition, 2002. Kamal Hasan Narpani Mantram, Head Office, Alwarpet, Chennai.
