= Kamal Haasan =

Indian actor, filmmaker, and politician (born 1954)

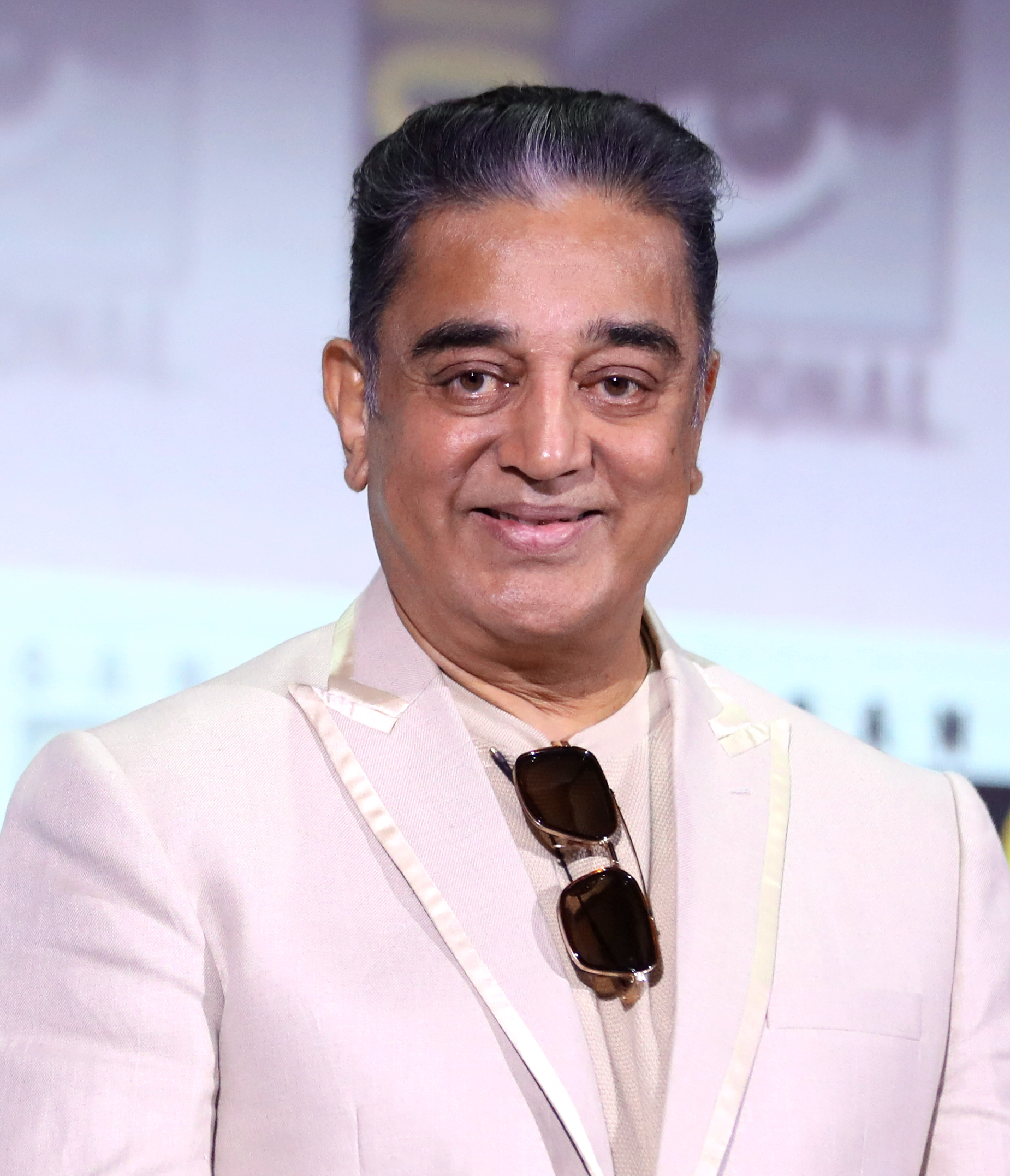
- Haasan at San Diego Comic-Con in 2023

Member of Parliament, Rajya Sabha
- Incumbent
- Assumed office 25 July 2025
- Preceded by: Vaiko
- Constituency: Tamil Nadu

Parliamentary Chairperson of the Makkal Needhi Maiam
- Incumbent
- Assumed office 25 July 2025
- Preceded by: Position established

President of the Makkal Needhi Maiam
- Incumbent
- Assumed office 21 February 2018
- Preceded by: Position established

Personal details
- Born: 7 November 1954 (age 72) Ramanathapuram, Madras State, India
- Other names: Ulaganayagan (Universal Hero); Kalaignani (Genius at Arts)
- Occupations: Filmmaker; politician; actor; playback singer; producer; lyricist
- Years active: 1960–present
- Works: Filmography; Discography
- Political party: Makkal Needhi Maiam (2018–present)
- Spouses: Vani Ganapathy (m. 1978; div. 1988) Sarika Thakur (m. 1988; div. 2004)
- Children: Shruti Haasan; Akshara Haasan
- Family: Haasan family
- Awards: Full list

Kamal Haasan (Note: In an interview, Haasan revealed that Parthasarathy was one of the names given to him. He was initially named after the Parthasarathy deity at Pallava-era temple in Chennai. Later his father changed his name to Kamal Haasan. His name as per the records of Rajya Sabha is Shri Kamal Haasan.) (born 7 November 1954) is an Indian actor, filmmaker and politician, currently serving as a Member of Parliament, Rajya Sabha for Tamil Nadu. He is an actor, director, producer, screenwriter, playback singer and lyricist who works primarily in Tamil cinema. He has also worked as an assistant director, choreographer, editor, make-up artist, narrator, television host, and a distributor of films. He founded a magazine, Maiam (lit. Center), which he edited, and has written over 100 poems and some books. He has made over 230 films in Tamil, Telugu, Malayalam, Hindi, Kannada and Bengali. He was conferred the Kalaimamani in 1978, the Padma Shri in 1990, the Padma Bhushan in 2014, and the Order of Arts and Letters (Chevalier) by the Government of France in 2016. He was invited by the Academy of Motion Picture Arts and Sciences in 2025 to become a member of its actors' branch.

Haasan was the first Tamil actor to convert his fan clubs into welfare associations. He was appointed an ambassador by the United Nations in 2007, for its joint campaign with the Tamil Nadu State AIDS Control Society to protect the rights of people living with HIV. On 21 February 2018, he launched a political party, Makkal Needhi Maiam (lit. People's Justice Centre). On 25 July 2025, he took oath as a member of Rajya Sabha (Council of States), the upper house of the Parliament of India.

== Early life and family ==
Kamal Haasan was born on 7 November 1954 in Paramakudi into a Tamil Brahmin Iyengar family, to D. Srinivasan Iyengar, who was a lawyer and freedom fighter, and Rajalakshmi, who was a housewife. He was initially named after Parthasarathy, the presiding deity at the Parthasarathy Temple, Chennai. His father later changed the name to Kamal Haasan, Kamal meaning lotus and Hassan deriving hasya, the Sanskrit word for laughter. His brothers, Charuhasan (born 1931) and Chandrahasan (1936–2017), have also been actors. Haasan's sister, Nalini Haassan (born 1946), is a classical dancer. He received his primary education in Paramakudi before moving to Madras (now Chennai) as his brothers pursued their higher education. Haasan continued his education in Santhome, Madras, and was attracted towards film and fine arts as encouraged by his father.

== Film career ==
=== 1960–1963 ===
When a physician friend of his mother visited A. V. Meiyappan (AVM) to treat his wife, she brought Haasan with her. Apparently impressed by his demeanor AVM's son, M. Saravanan, recommended him for their production Kalathur Kannamma. Haasan won the Rashtrapati Award (President's gold medal) for his performance in Kalathur Kannamma at age six and starred in five more films as a child. He debuted in the Malayalam film industry with Kannum Karalum (1962). Upon his father's encouragement, he joined a repertory company (T. K. S. Nataka Sabha) headed by T. K. Shanmugam. In the meanwhile, he continued his education at the Hindu Higher Secondary School in Triplicane. His time with the theatre company shaped Haasan's craft and kindled his interest in makeup.

=== 1970–1975 ===
After a seven-year hiatus from films, Haasan returned to the industry as a dance assistant, apprenticing under choreographer Thankappan. During this time, Haasan made brief appearances in some films including a few uncredited roles. His first appearance came in the 1970 film Maanavan, in which he appeared in a dance sequence. He went on to assist Thankappan in films such as Annai Velankani (1971) and Kasi Yathirai (1973). In the former he had a supporting role and worked as an assistant director. His first full-fledged role came in K. Balachander's Tamil film Arangetram (1973). Balachander cast him as the antagonist in his Sollathaan Ninaikkiren (1973). Haasan went on to do supporting roles in films such as Gumasthavin Magal (1974), Aval Oru Thodar Kathai (1974) and Naan Avanillai. The same year, he played his first lead role in the Malayalam film, Kanyakumari, for which he won his first Filmfare Award. In Tamil cinema, he had his breakthrough as a lead actor in Balachander's Apoorva Raagangal. He played a rebellious young man who falls in love with an older woman. For this character portrayal, Haasan learned to play the mridangam. The role won him his second Filmfare Award.

=== 1976–1979 ===
Kamal seen with Manish Tewari in 2013

In 1976, Haasan appeared in Balachander's Manmadha Leelai; this was followed by Oru Oodhappu Kan Simittugiradhu (directed by S. P. Muthuraman), which won him his third Filmfare Award. Haasan later appeared in the Balachander drama Moondru Mudichu. Avargal (1977) concerned the women's movement and, for this role, he learned ventriloquism. It was remade in Telugu as Idhi Katha Kadhu (1979), with Haasan reprising his role. 16 Vayathinile, in which he played a village bumpkin, which won him a fourth consecutive Best Actor award. In 1977 Haasan starred in his first Kannada film, Kokila, the directorial debut of friend and mentor Balu Mahendra. That year he also appeared in a Bengali film, Kabita, a remake of the Tamil film Aval Oru Thodar Kathai. In 1978 Haasan made his Telugu film debut with a lead role in the cross-cultural romantic Maro Charitra, directed by Balachander. His fifth consecutive Filmfare Award resulted from Sigappu Rojakkal, a thriller in which he played a psychopathic sexual killer. He appeared in the Malayalam film Eeta, for which he won his sixth Filmfare Award. He first played opposite to the Sridevi in the 1977 Malayalam movie Satyavan Savithri directed by P.G. Viswambharan, this combination was later on well-accepted and celebrated. In the 1979 Telugu film Sommokadidi Sokokadidi, Haasan played two parts. This was also his first collaboration with director Singeetam Srinivasa Rao. He appeared in the musical Ninaithale Inikkum, a snake-horror film Neeya and Kalyanaraman. At the end of the 1970s he had six regional Best Actor Filmfare Awards, including four consecutive Best Tamil Actor Awards.

=== 1980–1989 ===
Haasan's films during the 1980s included the 1980 Tamil-language Varumayin Niram Sivappu, the film was simultaneously shot in Telugu as Aakali Rajyam, in which he played an unemployed youth and earned him a first Filmfare Award in Telugu. In 1980 he appeared in the drama film Ullasa Paravaigal, Guru and Maria My Darling. Haasan made his debut in Hindi cinema with Ek Duuje Ke Liye (1981), the remake of his own acted Telugu-language film Maro Charitra directed by K. Balachander (which earned him his first Filmfare Hindi-language nomination). He made his 100th film appearance in 1981 in Raja Paarvai, debuting as a producer. Despite the film's relatively poor box-office performance, his portrayal of a blind session violinist earned him a Filmfare Award. After a year of starring in commercial films, Haasan won the first of three National Awards for Best Actor for his portrayal of a schoolteacher caring for an amnesia patient in Balu Mahendra's Moondram Pirai, later reprising his role in the Hindi version, Sadma. During this period he focused on Bollywood remakes of his Tamil films, including Yeh To Kamaal Ho Gaya and Zara Si Zindagi. In 1983 he appeared in Sagara Sangamam, directed by K. Viswanath. His portrayal of an alcoholic classical dancer won him his first Nandi Award for Best Actor and his second Filmfare Best Telugu Actor Award.

After 1984's multistarrer Raaj Tilak, Haasan appeared in Saagar (released 1985), winning the Filmfare Best Actor Award and nominated for the Best Supporting Actor award. The film was India's representative for the Best Foreign Language Oscar in 1985. He left Bollywood temporarily after Geraftaar and Dekha Pyar Tumhara to feature in Japanil Kalyanaraman (a sequel to his 1979 Kalyanaraman).

In 1986, Haasan produced the technically brilliant Vikram and collaborated with Kodandarami Reddy for Oka Radha Iddaru Krishnulu and then K. Viswanath in Swathi Muthyam, playing a cognitively disabled person who tries to change society and won him his second Nandi Award for Best Actor. it was India's entry for Best Foreign Language Film at the Academy Awards in 1986. These Tollywood films found him a large audience in Andhra Pradesh, and many of his later Tamil films were dubbed into Telugu.

Following Punnagai Mannan (in which he played two roles, including a satire of Charlie Chaplin as Chaplin Chellappa) and Kadhal Parisu, Haasan appeared in Mani Ratnam's 1987 film Nayakan. He received his second Indian National Award for his performance; Nayakan was submitted by India as its entry for Best Foreign Language Film at the 1987 Academy Awards, and is on the Time's All-Time 100 Movies list. Haasan appeared in his only dialogueless film to date: Pushpaka Vimana (1987) a black comedy film, in which he played an unemployed youth and earned him a first Filmfare Award in Kannada. In 1988 he appeared Unnal Mudiyum Thambi, Malayalam film Daisy and Sathyaa which were his own productions. Haasan's all four films of 1989 were major success, Apoorva Sagodharargal, where he played a dwarf, then Chanakyan, an original Malayalam film, later Vettri Vizhaa (where he played an amnesiac) and finally Haasan played two parts in Indrudu Chandrudu, winning the Filmfare Best Actor and won him his third Nandi Award for Best Actor for his performance. By the end of the 1980s Haasan was successful in the Malayalam, Kannada, Telugu and Hindi film industries, with Filmfare Awards in each industry and two national awards.

=== 1990–1998 ===
In 1990, Michael Madana Kama Rajan saw Haasan build on Apoorva Sagodharargal by playing quadruplets. It began as a collaboration with writer Crazy Mohan for future comedy films. Haasan won successive Best Actor awards for his portrayal of deranged, obsessive protagonists in Gunaa and Thevar Magan (which was remade in Hindi as 1997's Virasat). He was credited with the story for the latter. Haasan won his third National Film Award this time as a producer for Thevar Magan. The film was India's submission for the Academy Awards that year. A series of films followed: Singaravelan, Maharasan, Kalaignan, Mahanadhi, Nammavar, and Sathi Leelavathi. Sathi Leelavathi, produced by Haasan, featured himself alongside Kannada actor Ramesh Aravind and comedian Kovai Sarala. Haasan resumed his collaboration with K. Viswanath in the Telugu film, Subha Sankalpam, and starred in the police story Kuruthipunal (Tamil) simultaneously shot in Telugu as Drohi with Arjun Sarja and won Filmfare Best Actor. Haasan's success in the latter was followed by his third National Film Award for Best Actor for Indian. Haasan also won Tamil Nadu State Film Award for Best Actor and Filmfare Best Actor for Indian. The film was India's submission for the Academy Awards.

After Indian, Haasan played a woman in the comedy Avvai Shanmughi, which was inspired by Mrs. Doubtfire. He chose Shantanu Sheorey to direct the Hindi remake of Avvai Shanmughi, Chachi 420, but after dissatisfaction with five days of shooting Haasan took over as director. In 1997, Haasan began directing an unfinished biopic of Muhammad Yusuf Khan (born as Maruthanayagam Pillai), Marudhanayagam; a forty five minutes of film and a trailer was shot. Marudhanayagam was expected to be the biggest, most expensive film in Indian cinematic history and his magnum opus; a number of well-known actors and technicians had been signed, and it was launched at a public ceremony by Queen Elizabeth during her 1997 visit to India. Although the film failed to materialise due to budget constraints, Haasan expressed an interest in reviving the project. In 1998, he appeared in Singeetam Srinivasa Rao's romantic comedy, Kaathala Kaathala opposite Prabhu Deva. The film was a commercial success and was dubbed in Hindi as Mirch Masala, which was never released.

=== 2000–2009 ===
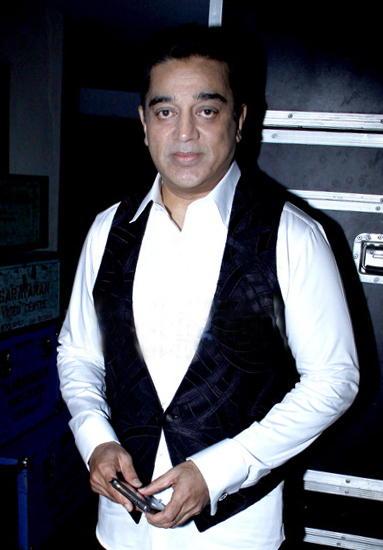
Kamal at 61st fim fare awards

After a two-year hiatus from Indian cinema, Haasan decided against reviving Marudhanayagam. He directed his second film, Hey Ram, a period drama, told in flashback, with a fact-based plot centering on the partition of India and the assassination of Mahatma Gandhi. Haasan produced and choreographed the film, writing its screenplay and lyrics; it was India's submission for the Academy Awards that year. Hey Ram was a box-office failure in India but was successful worldwide. Also in 2000, Haasan appeared in the comedy Thenali as a Sri Lankan Tamilian with PTSD who is under a psychiatrist's care. Thenali, starring Malayalam actor Jayaram, was a box-office success. Haasan's next film was 2001's Aalavandhan, in which he played two roles: For one he had his head shaved and gained ten kilograms. To play the other Army major in Aalavandhan, he went to the NDA for a crash course. The Hindi version was distributed by Shringar Films. Despite pre-release publicity, the film was a commercial failure.

After a number of successful comedies including Pammal K. Sambandam and Panchatanthiram and guest appearances, Haasan directed Virumaandi, a film about capital punishment which won the Best Asian Film Award at the Puchon International Fantastic Film Festival. He also appeared in Anbe Sivam with Madhavan. Priyadarshan, its original director, left and Sundar C completed the film. Anbe Sivam tells the story of Nallasivam, portrayed by Haasan as a communist. His performance was praised by critics, with The Hindu saying that he "has once again done Tamil cinema proud".

In 2004 Haasan appeared in Vasool Raja MBBS, a remake of Bollywood's Munna Bhai M.B.B.S., with Sneha which was a box-office success. The following year, he wrote and starred in the comedy Mumbai Xpress. Released during Tamil New Year, it was a disappointment at the box office despite positive reviews. He appeared in a Kannada comedy film Rama Shama Bhama with Ramesh Aravind. In 2006 Haasan's long-delayed project, the stylish police story Vettaiyaadu Vilaiyaadu, was a success. Directed by Gautham Vasudev Menon, the film is about a police officer sent to the US to investigate a series of medical murders. In 2008's Dasavathaaram, he played ten roles; the film was released in a number of languages (including Tamil, Telugu and Hindi) throughout India and overseas. Dasavathaaram, written by Haasan and director K. S. Ravikumar, is one of the first modern science-fiction films made in India. Starring Haasan and Asin, it was the highest-grossing Tamil film (as of 2008) and his performance was critically praised. In Canada, Dasavathaaram was the first Tamil film distributed by Walt Disney Pictures.

After Dasavathaaram, Haasan directed a film tentatively titled Marmayogi, which stalled after a year of pre-production. He then produced and starred in Unnaipol Oruvan, a remake of the Bollywood film A Wednesday, where he reprised the role originally played by Naseeruddin Shah with Malayalam actor Mohanlal playing Anupam Kher's role. It was released in Telugu as Eeenadu, with Venkatesh reprising the role played by Kher. Both versions were critically acclaimed and commercially successful.

=== 2010–2019 ===
Filming of Vishwaroopam

Haasan collaborated for the fifth time with Ravikumar in Manmadan Ambu, for which he also wrote the screenplay. The story concerns a man who hires a detective to find out if his fiancée is cheating on him. The film was released in December 2010 to mixed reviews, with Behindwoods calling it "an entertainer, but in parts" and Sify saying it "lacks the punch to captivate the audiences".

Haasan's next film after Manmadhan Ambu was 2013's Vishwaroopam, released in Hindi as Vishwaroop. It won two National Film Awards (Best Production Design and Best Choreography) at the 60th National Film Awards. Muslim groups in Tamil Nadu demanded the ban of the film and claimed, that the film would hurt Muslim sentiments.

In May 2014, he was appointed as the official Indian delegate to the 67th Cannes Film Festival. As of July 2014, he was working on three films: Uttama Villain, Vishwaroopam II, the sequel of Vishwaroopam and Papanasam. After 2 years of Vishwaroopam's release, Uttama Villain was released on 2 May 2015 with exceptional critical reviews and on 3 July 2015, Papanasam a Tamil remake of Malayalam film Drishyam was released with positive reviews and became a huge success followed by the bi-lingual Thoongaa Vanam and Cheekati Rajyam, both doing moderate business.

He was set to reprise his role of Balram Naidu (a Telugu RAW Officer) from Dasavathaaram in a spin-off film directed by himself titled Sabaash Naidu. The film was to be made in Tamil, Telugu, and Hindi (as Shabhash Kundu). The film's release date has been delayed owing to Haasan's entry into politics, and he pledged that he would focus on working on Indian 2 instead.

=== 2020–present ===
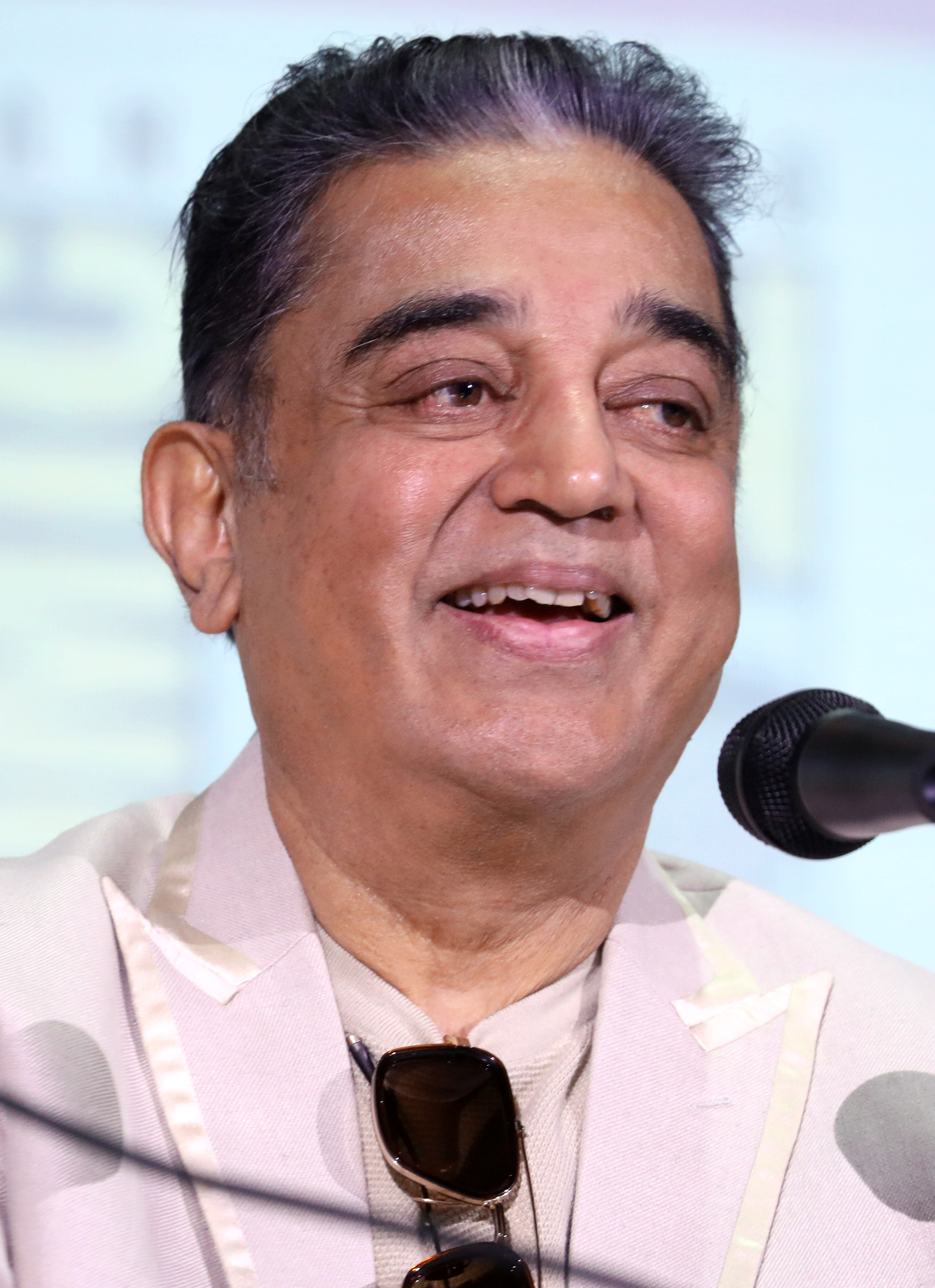
Haasan at San Diego Comic-Con in 2023

On 17 September 2020, Director Lokesh Kanagaraj announced through his Twitter handle that his next venture will have Kamal Haasan in lead role with Anirudh handling the music with the movie titled as Vikram. It was Kamal Haasan's 232nd film as an actor. It also Stars Fahadh Faasil, Vijay Sethupathi in the leading roles along with Suriya makes a cameo appearance in the film. The film was released on 3 June 2022 and was a huge commercial success grossing an estimated ₹424–500 crore and went on to become the 2nd highest-grossing Tamil film of the year and third highest-grossing Tamil film of all time. The first single of Vikram titled "Pathala Pathala" received several million views from Kamal Haasan's fans and was the most viewed song on YouTube. The song also received praise for Kamal Haasan's dance performances which went viral. Despite facing controversies from the song, it became an instant hit. In August 2022, the filming for Indian 2 resumed, after a break of almost a year. The film was released on 12 July 2024, to negative reviews from critics and bombed at the box-office. But still it become one of the highest-grossing Tamil film of the year.

In June 2023, he was cast in Kalki 2898 AD as the antagonist, marking his comeback in Telugu cinema. It was the first film in Indian cinema to attend San Diego Comic-Con, in July 2023. Along with the director and producers of the film, Nag Ashwin, C. Aswani Dutt, and Swapna Dutt, he presented the panel of the film with Prabhas and Rana Daggubati. At the box office, it grossed more than ₹1,000 crore to emerge a superhit as well as the second highest-grossing Indian film of 2024. In October 2023, he gave a voice-over for his character in Leo, the third entry in the Lokiverse. After Indian 2, he was to collaborate with H. Vinoth, for his 233rd film, yet, the film was shelved due to creative differences.

He has also announced his reunion with Mani Ratnam for his 234th film, entitled Thug Life, which was released in theatres on 5 June 2025 and received negative reviews and it became a box office bomb.

=== Off-screen contributions ===
In addition to acting, Haasan is noted for his involvement in other aspects of filmmaking. He has written many of his films, including Raja Paarvai, Apoorva Sagodharargal, Michael Madana Kama Rajan, Thevar Magan, Mahanadhi, Hey Ram, Aalavandhan, Anbe Sivam, Nala Damayanthi, Virumaandi, Dasavathaaram, Manmadan Ambu and Vishwaroopam. Haasan's production company (Raaj Kamal Films International) has produced several of his films, and he directed Chachi 420, Hey Ram, Virumaandi and Vishwaroopam. He considered directing full-time if Hey Ram was successful, but changed his mind when the film failed at the box office. In his earlier career, he choreographed for MGR in Naan Yen Pirandhen, Sivaji Ganesan in Savaale Samaali and Jayalalithaa in Anbu Thangai In 2010 Haasan said he wanted to do more directing, since young actors wished to work for him. When he played supporting roles early in his career he wanted to become a technician and joked: "Film makers like K. Balachander told me that I won't be able make much money by being a technician. So the result is that the star Kamal funds the technician Kamal in pursuing his dreams". Haasan attended workshops for makeup technicians in the US for several years, and trained as a makeup artist under Michael Westmore.

Haasan has written songs for his films. He wrote the lyrics for a single in Hey Ram, songs in Virumaandi and Unnaipol Oruvan and the album for Manmadhan Ambu. Haasan's musical work has been well received by his peers in Tamil film. He is also a playback singer, singing in Tamil, Hindi, Telugu, Malayalam and English. Haasan also wrote the lyrics for a song about the COVID-19 pandemic in India and released its music video, "Arivum Anbum". The album, composed by Ghibran and directed by Haasan, featured Anirudh Ravichander, Yuvan Shankar Raja and a number of other contemporary performers.

In 2021, Haasan featured in a song 'Shades of Blue: A Musical Tribute to Venmurasu' composed by Raleigh Rajan and released by Director Mani Ratnam in honor of Venmurasu, the longest novel ever written in any language. Earlier, he has spoken in appreciation of Venmurasu and writer Jeyamohan on Bigg Boss during his book recommendations. In 2022, Haasan was the lyricist and the playback singer for the song "Pathala Pathala" from Vikram.

=== Bigg Boss Tamil ===
Haasan made his return on Star Vijay TV, hosting the first season of Bigg Boss Tamil in 2017. The show soon went onto become one of the most watched television series in Tamil Nadu and gained positive reviews among audience from season 1 onwards. Haasan also hosted the second season of Bigg Boss Tamil 2 which started its telecast on 17 June 2018, Bigg Boss Tamil 3 which started its telecast on 23 June 2019 and Bigg Boss Tamil 4 which started telecast on 4 October 2020. He hosted Bigg Boss Tamil 5 which started to telecast from 3 October 2021. Then, now he is the host to the Bigg Boss Ultimate (Season 1) which is to be launched on Disney+ Hotstar from 30 January 2022. He exited the show after the third week owing to scheduling conflicts with his film Vikram. Later, Silambarasan replaced him as the host from week 4 onwards. Then, Kamal Haasan returned as a host in Bigg Boss Tamil Season 6 and season 7. After that, he quit the show due to film commitments and he was replaced by Vijay Sethupathi.

=== KH House of Khaddar (KHHK) ===
Kamal Haasan launched his personal fashion line, called KH House of Khaddar (KHHK). It is a sustainable fashion brand co-founded by Kamal Haasan and designed by Amritha Ram, focusing on blending India's Khadi handloom heritage with Western silhouettes for a contemporary global audience. The brand was first introduced at a high-profile launch in Chicago in November 2021, followed by its Indian debut on Republic Day 2022.

== Personal life ==
=== Family ===
Haasan was born into a Tamil family in the town of Paramakudi, in the Ramanathapuram district of Tamil Nadu, to criminal defence lawyer D. Srinivasan and Rajalakshmi, a housewife. In 2013 his daughter Shruti Haasan appeared on an episode of Neengalum Vellalam Oru Kodi, where she availed the "phone a friend" option to call her father Kamal, he stated that his parents named him Parthasarathy before he was called as Kamal Haasan and his mother always used to call him by his birth name. In an interview with Karan Thapar, Haasan said his father was literate in Sanskrit. Haasan is the youngest of four children; his siblings are Charuhasan, Chandrahasan and Nalini (Raghu). His two older brothers followed their father's example and studied law. Haasan continued his education in Sir M.Ct. Muthiah Chettiar Boys Higher Secondary School and Hindu Higher Secondary School in Madras (now Chennai).

Haasan has alluded to his parents in some of his works, notably Unnaipol Oruvan and in the song "Kallai Mattum" in Dasavathaaram. His eldest brother Charuhasan, like Haasan, is a National Film Award-winning actor who appeared in the Kannada film Tabarana Kathe. Charuhasan's daughter Suhasini is also a National Film Award-winning actress married to director (and fellow award-winner) Mani Ratnam, who collaborated with Haasan on 1987's Nayakan. Chandrahasan has produced several of Haasan's films and was an executive with Raaj Kamal Films International. He died in March 2017. Chandrahasan's daughter Anu Hasan has had supporting roles in several films, including Suhasini's Indira. Haasan's sister, Nalini Raghu, is a dance teacher for whom he named an auditorium (Nalini Mahal). Her son, Gautham, played Haasan's character's grandson in Hey Ram.

=== Relationships ===
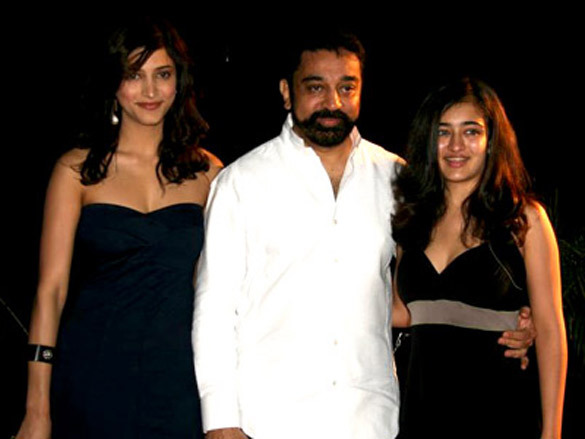
Haasan with daughters Shruti (left) and Akshara (right)

In 1978, at age 24, Haasan married dancer Vani Ganapathy. She acted with Haasan in the 1975 movie Melnaattu Marumagal. After marriage, Vani worked as Haasan's costume designer for several movies. They divorced ten years later.

Haasan and actress Sarika began living together in 1988, marrying after the birth of their first child, Shruti (born 1986). Shruti is a singer and an actress. Their younger daughter, Akshara (born 1991), is an assistant director and actress. Sarika stopped acting soon after their marriage, Sarika worked as Haasan's costume designer for the movie Hey Ram and won the National Film Award for Best Costume Designer. In 2002, the couple filed for divorce, which became final in 2004. After their divorce, Sarika acted in movies and TV serials, winning the National Film Award for Best Actress for the 2005 film Parzania.

From 2005 to 2016, Haasan was in a relationship with actress Gautami. He co-starred with her frequently during the late 1980s and early 1990s.

Early in his career, he co-starred in several films with Srividya with whom he was in relationship. Haasan visited Srividya on her deathbed in 2006.

=== Views ===
Haasan is an atheist and rationalist and has often questioned the existence of God and has highlighted the theme in his films like Anbe Sivam and Dasavathaaram. He was mistaken to be Muslim because of his Arabic-sounding name, most notably when he was denied preclearance to travel to the United States by Customs and Border Protection authorities at Toronto Pearson International Airport in 2002.

In Sanskrit Kamal means "lotus", but it was rumoured that his name originated with a friend of his father (Yaakob Hassan, a Muslim freedom fighter who was imprisoned along with Kamal's father by the British). In a BBC interview with Karan Thapar, Haasan said that his last name derives from the Sanskrit word hasya, and although the Yaakob Hassan connection was publicised by the media it was only "a story". Haasan is considered left-leaning or independent. Although he initially abstained from politics, he entered regional politics in Tamil Nadu in 2018. He also said that his entering politics would result in his death within a year.

== Humanitarian work ==
Haasan with social activist M. B. Nirmal (right) in Chennai

Haasan is the first Tamil actor to convert his fan clubs into welfare organisations and is involved in social-service activities through the clubs under the name Kamal Narpani Iyakkam (Kamal Welfare Association). His fan clubs help organise blood- and eye-donation drives, and donate educational materials to students.

Haasan received the first Abraham Kovoor National Award for humanist activities in 2004. He was project ambassador for Hridayaragam 2010, which raised funds for an orphanage for HIV/AIDS-affected children. In September 2010 Haasan launched a children's cancer relief fund and gave roses to children with cancer at Sri Ramachandra University in Porur, Chennai. He has pledged his product-endorsement income to social causes. Haasan, along with his partner Gautami, won ₹ 5 million on Neengalum Vellalam Oru Kodi in March 2013 and donated the prize money to Petral Thaan Pillaya, a nonprofit organization supporting cancer patients.

Haasan was nominated by the Indian Prime Minister Narendra Modi for the Swachh Bharat campaign. He chose to clean the Madambakkam lake in Chennai with the Environmentalist Foundation of India's Arun Krishnamurthy on 7 November 2014.

Known for refusing any kind of brand endorsement, Haasan endorsed Pothys for the first time in 2015. His daughter, Shruti has previously endorsed Pothys. In the past, Haasan has stated that should he ever act in commercials, the revenue earned from them would be donated to HIV affected children.

== Literary works ==
Haasan founded the magazine Maiam (lit. Center) in 1987 which he edited. It was run by the Kamal Haasan Welfare Association. He has also written more than 100 poems. Some of his literary contributions are listed here:

- Dhaayam (transl. Dice), a 1984 psychological thriller novel written by Haasan, which served as the basis for his 2001 bilingual film adaptation Aalavandhan (Abhay in Hindi).
- Thedi Theerpom Va (transl. Come, Let's Find and Solve), a 2008 semi-autobiographical book published by the Kamal Haasan Welfare Association, comprising 15 brief essays written by Haasan on many subjects including cinema, child/drug abuse, Kashmir imbroglio, and the utopian ideal of a casteless society.
- Maiam: Thaerndheydutha Padaippugal (transl. Maiam: Selected Works), book published on 1 September 2024, which is a compilation of several articles and columns written by Haasan for his magazine Maiam between 1987 and 1990.
- Haasan continues to write for leading newspapers. His recent article, "Centrism isn't nostalgia, it is survival" was published by The Times of India on 24 August 2025.

=== Haasan's screenplays published as books ===
- Kamal Haasante Randu Thirakkathakal (transl. Two Scripts by Kamal Haasan), book published on 28 October 2007, which is a Malayalam version of the screenplays written by Haasan for his films Mahanadhi (1994) and Hey Ram (2000).
- Viswaroopam, book published by DC Books on 7 November 2013, which is a Malayalam version of the screenplay written by Haasan for his 2013 bilingual film Vishwaroopam (Vishwaroop in Hindi).
- Hey Ram, a 2017 book published by Sapna Book House, Tamil version of the screenplay written by Haasan for his bilingual film Hey Ram (2000), which was shot simultaneously in Tamil and Hindi.

== Political career ==
He formed the centrist party Makkal Needhi Maiam (MNM), a regional political party in Tamil Nadu. He formally announced the party's formation on 21 February 2018 in Madurai. The party's flag displays six joined hands in a circle in alternate red and white colours with a white star at its centre in a black background. Haasan began his political journey from late President A. P. J. Abdul Kalam's residence and his memorial at Rameswaram.

His party contested in 37 seats in 2019 Indian general election and lost. Makkal Needhi Maiam's vote share in the 2019 Lok Sabha election was 3.72% (in the seats it contested). He unsuccessfully contested the 2021 Tamil Nadu Legislative Assembly election from Coimbatore South and lost to BJP Mahila Morcha President Vanathi Srinivasan by a narrow margin.

On 25 July 2025, Haasan took oath as a member of Rajya Sabha (Council of States), the upper house of the Parliament of India. He was elected unopposed with the support of the DMK-led Alliance.

== Awards and honours ==
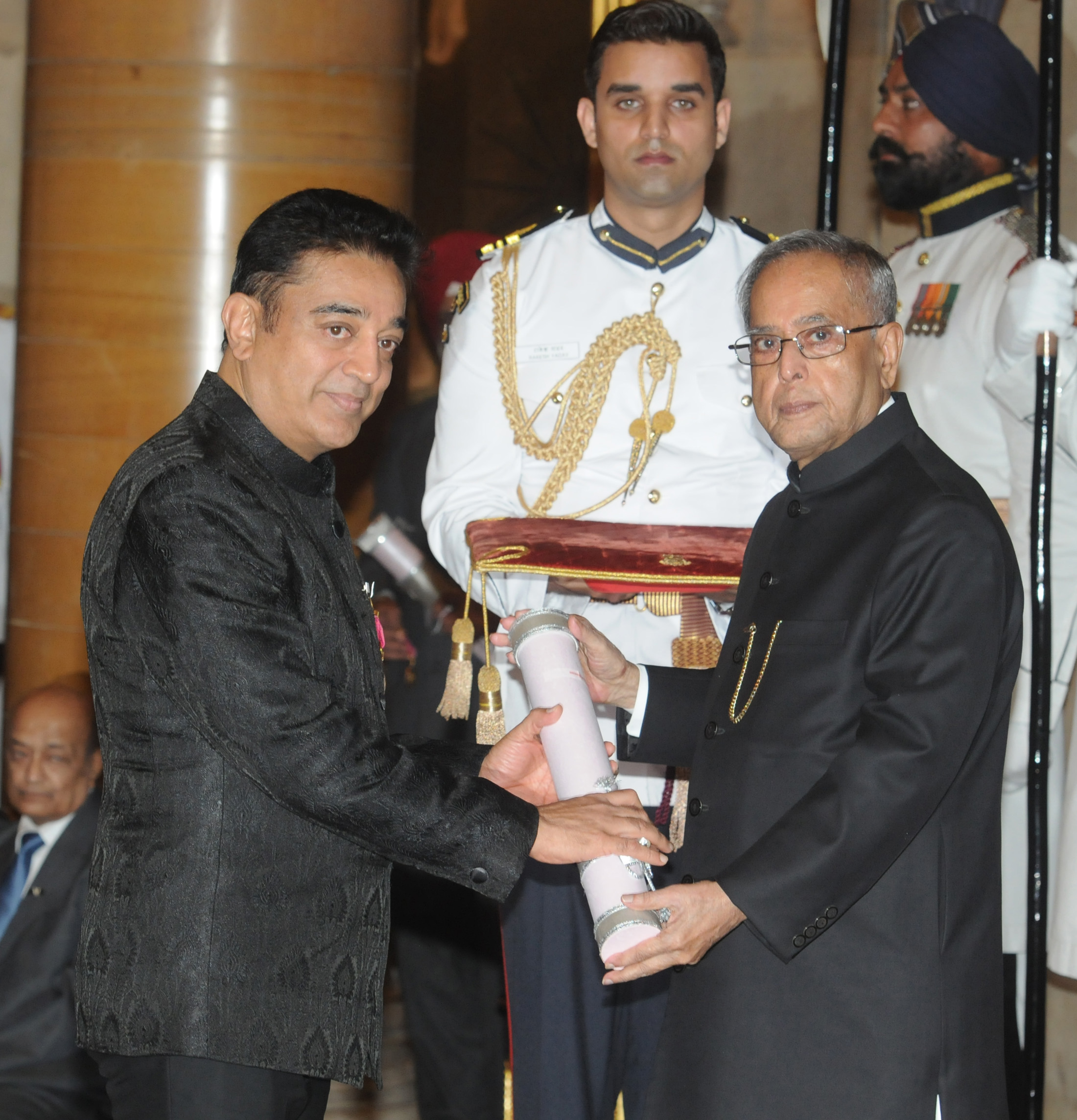
The President of India, Shri Pranab Mukherjee presenting the Padma Bhushan Award to Shri Kamal Haasan, at a Civil Investiture Ceremony, at Rashtrapati Bhavan, in New Delhi on March 31, 2014

=== Civilian honours ===
Haasan was conferred the Padma Shri (lit. 'Lotus Honour') by the Government of India in 1990, the Padma Bhushan (lit. 'Lotus Decoration') by the President of India in 2014 and the Chevalier de L'Ordre des Arts et des Lettres (The Knight of the Order of Arts and Letters) by the Government of France in 2016.

=== State Government awards ===
The Government of Tamil Nadu honoured Haasan with the Kalaimamani (lit. 'Jewel of Arts') in 1978, the MGR Award in 1989, and the Sivaji Ganesan Award in 1999. He also received the NTR National Award from the Government of Andhra Pradesh in 2014 and the Paidipati Jairaj Award from the Government of Telangana in 2026.

=== Film awards ===
Haasan has won 5 National Film Awards – Best Child Artist for Kalathur Kannamma (1960), (Note: The award for best acting was given out as a Rashtrapati Award (President's Gold Medal) until the 14th National Film Awards ceremony held in 1967, when the National Awards were called as the "State Awards for Films". They were renamed to the current National Film Awards from the 15th National Film Awards ceremony held in 1968.) three Best Actor Awards for Moondram Pirai (1982), Nayakan (1987), Indian (1996), and Best Tamil Film for Thevar Magan (1992).

Haasan has won 21 Filmfare Awards in total, the most for any actor. He holds the record for the most Filmfare Awards for Best Actor, with a total of 18 wins – eleven in Tamil, three in Telugu, two in Malayalam, one in Hindi, and one in Kannada. He has been nominated for 64 Filmfare Awards, the most for any actor. He also holds the record for the most Filmfare Award nominations for acting, with 50 nominations. He is the only actor who has won Filmfare Awards across five different languages. (Note: Though Haasan wrote a letter to the organisation asking them to not give him any more awards after his win for Hey Ram (2000), he won his eighteenth Award for Best Actor in a Leading Role (Male) for Vikram (2022) at the 68th Filmfare Awards South 2023 - Tamil.)

He has also won many awards at various international film festivals, (Note: Haasan's films that were screened at film festivals in countries other than India: 1. Sagara Sangamam (1983) – Asia-Pacific Film Festival, Moscow International Film Festival; 2. Swathi Muthyam (1986) – Asia-Pacific Film Festival, Moscow International Film Festival; 3. Nayakan (1987) – International Film Festival Rotterdam; 4. Pushpaka Vimana (1987) – Cannes Film Festival, International Film Festival Rotterdam, Shanghai International Film Festival; 5. Thevar Magan (1992) – International Film Festival Rotterdam, Toronto International Film Festival; 6. Mahanadhi (1994) – International Film Festival Rotterdam; 7. Kuruthipunal (1995) – International Film Festival Rotterdam; 8. Hey Ram (2000) – International Film Festival Rotterdam, Toronto International Film Festival, Locarno Film Festival; 9. Aalavandhan (2001) – Fantastic Fest; 10. Virumaandi (2004) – International Film Festival Rotterdam, Puchon International Fantastic Film Festival (PiFan); 11. Vishwaroopam (2013) – India International Film Festival of Tampa Bay; 12. Uttama Villain (2015) – Los Angeles Independent Film Festival (LAIFF); 13. Vikram (2022) – Busan International Film Festival, Osaka Tamil International Film Festival; 14. Kalki 2898 AD (2024) – Busan International Film Festival) including the inaugural Best Asian Film Award at the Bucheon International Fantastic Film Festival, South Korea, for his directorial Virumaandi (2004).

== Controversies ==
Haasan has been involved in several controversies.

In 2015, Haasan was criticised by the-then Tamil Nadu Finance Minister O. Panneerselvam, who stated that Haasan was "confused" and had "blabbered", unaware of the ground reality for his statement on the government's response to rain relief efforts. Haasan was also criticised by Nayakan's producer Muktha Srinivasan for his article in The Hindu taking unnecessary credit for that film. Directors like Bharathan, who was irked by the unnecessary interferences of Kamal during the filming of Thevar Magan, and Balachandra Menon, who criticized Kamal for making his film, Kanden Seethaiyai, shelved by leaving the project, were some of the filmmakers who had rifts with Kamal. Sibi Malayil was supposed to direct the film Gunaa. But when he understood that Kamal Haasan would take the decisions regarding the making of film, Sibi withdrew from the project.

Haasan has been accused of self-indulgence, and has been criticised for sexually explicit scenes and themes, offending religious sentiments and superficiality on social issues depicted in his films. There have also been complaints about his obsession with perfection, which may have caused some of his films to run over budget. He was also accused of kissing actress Rekha Harris without her consent in a scene during the shooting of Punnagai Mannan. His former partner Gautami had said that Kamal Haasan hasn't paid her salary dues since 2016. She also accused Haasan of hurting her film prospects by preventing her from working with others.

In November 2017, Haasan said that right-wing Hindus have started employing extremism to propagate their communal agenda. In May 2019, he passed a controversial remark that independent India's first terrorist was a Hindu during his election campaign.

In May 2025, Haasan made a statement that "Kannada was born out of Tamil", which offended Kannadigas and Pro-Kannada activists. His refusal to apologise sparked wide spread protests in Karnataka and led to the Karnataka Film Chamber of Commerce calling for ban on the release of Thug Life. On 3 June 2025, the Karnataka High Court, warned Haasan that he cannot use his right to speech "to hurt sentiments".

In August, 2025, Haasan made controversial remarks on the necessity of education in Chennai, "Education (is the) only weapon that can break (the) chains of dictatorship and Sanatan".

== Elections contested and positions held ==
=== Rajya Sabha elections ===
Elections	Constituency	Political party	Result
2025	Tamil Nadu	MNM	Won

=== Tamil Nadu Legislative Assembly elections ===
Elections	Assembly	Constituency	Political party	Result	Vote percentage	Opposition		
Elections	Assembly	Constituency	Political party	Result	Vote percentage	Candidate	Political party	Vote percentage
2021	16th	Coimbatore South	MNM	Lost	33.26%	Vanathi Srinivasan	BJP	34.38%

=== Positions in Parliament of the Republic of India ===
Elections	Position	Elected constituency	Term in office		
Elections	Position	Elected constituency	Assumed office	Left office	Time in office
2025	Member of Parliament, Rajya Sabha	Tamil Nadu	25 July 2025	Incumbent	1 year, 120 days

== Bibliography ==
- K. Hariharan (10 July 2024). Kamal Haasan: A Cinematic Journey (1st ed.). HarperCollins Publishers India. 280 pages. ISBN 9789354899621. "One of the greatest actors India has ever produced, Kamal Haasan is unique in many ways. He has usually gone beyond just enacting a role to completely immersing himself in it."

== See also ==
- Kamal Haasan filmography
- Kamal Haasan discography
- List of awards and nominations received by Kamal Haasan
- Kamal Haasan's unrealized projects
- Raaj Kamal Films International
- Makkal Needhi Maiam
- Haasan family
