= Kamal Haasan discography =

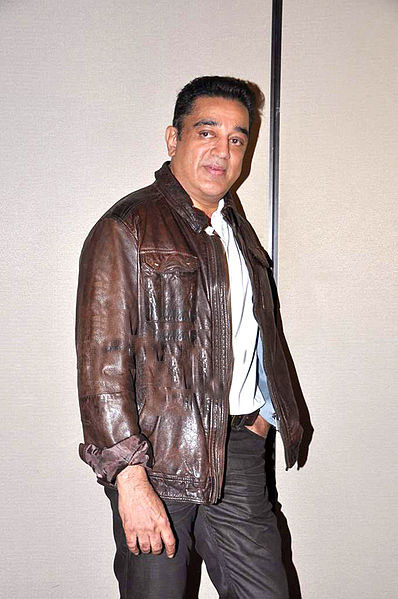
Haasan promoting Vishwaroopam in 2013.

Kamal Haasan is an Indian actor, director, producer, screenwriter, playback singer and lyricist who works primarily in Tamil cinema. He has also worked as an assistant director, choreographer, editor, make-up artist, narrator, television host, and a distributor of films.

== As playback singer ==
Year	Film	Song	Language	Music director	Lyrics	Ref.
1975	Andharangam	Nyayiru Oli Mazhaiyil	Tamil	G. Devarajan	Nethaji	
1977	Siva Thandavum	Peethaambaraa Oh Krishnaa	Malayalam	M. B. Sreenivasan	M. B. Sreenivasan	
1978	Padakuthira	Ragalolayaay Kamalolayaay Neelayaamini	Malayalam	Kannur Rajan	Mankombu Gopalakrishnan	
1978	Aval Appadithan	Panneer Pushpangale	Tamil	Ilaiyaraaja	Gangai Amaran	
1978	Sigappu Rojakkal	Ninaivo Oru Paravai	Tamil	Ilaiyaraaja	Vaali	
1980	Maria My Darling	Rasathi Unna Pakka Aasai	Tamil	Shankar–Ganesh	Pulamaipithan	
1980	Maria My Darling	Obba Ninge	Kannada	Shankar–Ganesh	Chi. Udayashankar	
1980	Saranam Ayyappa	Anna Vaada	Tamil	Chandrabose		
1981	Raja Paarvai	Vizhiyorathu Kanavum	Tamil	Ilaiyaraaja	Gangai Amaran	
1981	Savaal	Thanniya Potta	Tamil	M. S. Viswanathan	Kannadasan	
1982	Moondram Pirai	Narikathai	Tamil	Ilaiyaraaja	Vairamuthu	
1983	Sadma	Ek Daf Ek Jungle Tha	Hindi	Ilaiyaraaja	Gulzar	
1984	Oh Maane Maane	Ponmaanai Theduthe	Tamil	Ilaiyaraaja	Mu. Metha	
1985	Dekha Pyar Tumhara	Na Baba Na Baba	Hindi	Laxmikant–Pyarelal	Anjaan	
1985	Japanil Kalyanaraman	Appappoi Ammammoi	Tamil	Ilaiyaraaja	Vaali	
1986	Vikram	Vikram..Vikram...	Tamil	Ilaiyaraaja	Vairamuthu	
1986	Oka Radha Iddaru Krishnulu	Vey..Vey..	Telugu	Ilaiyaraaja	Veturi	
1987	Per Sollum Pillai	Ammamma Vanthathingu	Tamil	Ilaiyaraaja	Pulamaipithan	
1987	Nayakan	Thenpandi Cheemayile	Tamil	Ilaiyaraaja	Pulamaipithan	
1988	Sathyaa	Potta Padiyudhu	Tamil	Ilaiyaraaja	Pulamaipithan	
1989	Apoorva Sagodharargal	Raja Kaiya Vachchaa	Tamil	Ilaiyaraaja	Vaali	
1990	Appu Raja	Raja Naam Mera	Hindi	Ilaiyaraaja	Prem Dhawan	
1990	Michael Madana Kama Rajan	Sundhari Neeyum Sundharan Njanum	Tamil	Ilaiyaraaja	Poovachal Khadar	
1991	Gunaa	Kanmani Anbodu Kadhalan	Tamil	Ilaiyaraaja	Vaali	
1992	Singaravelan	Pottu Vaitha Kathal Thitam	Tamil	Ilaiyaraaja	Vaali	
1992	Singaravelan	Sonnapadi Kellu	Tamil	Ilaiyaraaja	Vaali	
1992	Thevar Magan	Sandhu Pottu	Tamil	Ilaiyaraaja	Vaali	
1992	Thevar Magan	Inji Idupazhagi	Tamil	Ilaiyaraaja	Vaali	
1993	Kalaignan	Kokkarakko	Tamil	Ilaiyaraaja	Vaali	
1994	Mahanadhi	Engeyo Thikkudesai	Tamil	Ilaiyaraaja	Vaali	
1994	Mahanadhi	Peigala Bhoodhama	Tamil	Ilaiyaraaja	Vaali	
1994	Mahanadhi	Thanmanam Ulla Nenjum	Tamil	Ilaiyaraaja	Vaali	
1994	Mahanadhi	Pirar Vaada(Poem)	Tamil	Ilaiyaraaja	Bharathiyar	
1995	Sathi Leelavathi	Marugo Marugo	Tamil	Ilaiyaraaja	Vaali	
1996	Avvai Shanmughi	Rukku Rukku	Tamil	Deva	Vaali	
1997	Ullaasam	Mutthey Mutthamma	Tamil	Karthik Raja	Paarthi Bhaskar	
1997	Chachi 420	Jaago Gori (Chachi's Voice)	Hindi	Vishal Bharadwaj	Gulzar	
1997	Chachi 420	Jaago Gori (male voice, soundtrack only)	Hindi	Vishal Bharadwaj	Gulzar	
1998	Kaathala Kaathala	Kaasumela	Tamil	Karthik Raja	Vaali	
1998	Kaathala Kaathala	Madonna Paadala Nee	Tamil	Karthik Raja	Vaali	
1998	Kaathala Kaathala	Saravana Bhava	Tamil	Karthik Raja	Vaali	
1998	Kaathala Kaathala	Anaconda	Tamil	Karthik Raja	Vaali	
1998	Navvandi Lavvandi (D)	Lucku Meeda Lucku Vachchi	Telugu	Karthik Raja		
1998	Navvandi Lavvandi (D)	Madona I	Telugu	Karthik Raja		
1998	Navvandi Lavvandi (D)	Saravanabhava	Telugu	Karthik Raja		
2000	Hey Ram	Ram Ram	Tamil	Ilaiyaraaja	Kamal Haasan	
2000	Hey Ram	Ramaranalum	Tamil	Ilaiyaraaja	Vaali	
2000	Hey Ram	Sanyaas Mantra	Tamil	Ilaiyaraaja		
2000	Hey Ram	Hey! Ram	Hindi	Ilaiyaraaja	Sameer Anjaan	
2000	Hey Ram	Chahe Pandit Ho	Hindi	Ilaiyaraaja	Sameer Anjaan	
2000	Hey Ram	Sanyaas Mantra	Hindi	Ilaiyaraaja		
2000	Thenali	Alangatti Mazhai	Tamil	A. R. Rahman	Kalaikumar	
2000	Thenali	Injerungo Injerungo	Tamil	A. R. Rahman	Thamarai	
2001	Aalavandhan	Kadavul Paadhi	Tamil	Shankar–Ehsaan–Loy	Vairamuthu	
2001	Aalavandhan	Siri Siri	Tamil	Shankar–Ehsaan–Loy	Vairamuthu	
2001	Abhay	Kal Tak Mujhko Gaurav Tha	Hindi	Shankar–Ehsaan–Loy	Javed Akhtar	
2001	Abhay	Hey! Who Are you	Hindi	Shankar–Ehsaan–Loy	Javed Akhtar	
2001	Abhay	Hans De Hans De	Hindi	Shankar–Ehsaan–Loy	Javed Akhtar	
2002	Panchathanthiram	Kadhal Piriyamal	Tamil	Deva	Vairamuthu	
2002	Panchathanthiram	Vandhen Vandhen	Tamil	Deva	Vairamuthu	
2002	Panchatantram (D)	Vacha Vacha	Telugu	Deva	Chandrabose	
2002	Panchatantram (D)	Virahame Leka	Telugu	Deva	Bhuvanachandra	
2002	Pammal K. Sambandam	Kandhasamy Maadasamy	Tamil	Deva	Kamal Haasan	
2003	Anbe Sivam	Anbe Sivam	Tamil	Vidyasagar	Vairamuthu	
2003	Anbe Sivam	Eley Machi	Tamil	Vidyasagar	Vairamuthu	
2003	Anbe Sivam	Naatukkoru Seithi	Tamil	Vidyasagar	Vairamuthu	
2003	Nala Damayanthi	Sudupattadha	Tamil	Ramesh Vinayagam	Vaali	
2003	Nala Damayanthi	Stranded on the street	Tamil	Ramesh Vinayagam	Vaali	
2004	Vasool Raja MBBS	Kalakapovathu Yaaru	Tamil	Bharadwaj	Vairamuthu	
2004	Vasool Raja MBBS	Alwarpettai Aluda	Tamil	Bharadwaj	Vairamuthu	
2004	Virumaandi	Onnavida	Tamil	Ilaiyaraaja	Kamal Haasan	
2004	Virumaandi	Andha Kandamani	Tamil	Ilaiyaraaja	Muthulingam	
2004	Virumaandi	Anna Lakshmi	Tamil	Ilaiyaraaja	Muthulingam	
2004	Virumaandi	Karbagraham Vitu Samy Veliyerathu	Tamil	Ilaiyaraaja	Muthulingam	
2004	Virumaandi	Kombulae Poova Suthi	Tamil	Ilaiyaraaja	Ilaiyaraaja	
2004	Virumaandi	Maada Vilakkae	Tamil	Ilaiyaraaja	Muthulingam	
2005	Mumbai Xpress	Yele Nee Etti	Tamil	Ilaiyaraaja	Vaali	
2005	Mumbai Xpress	Kurangu Kaiyil Maalai	Tamil	Ilaiyaraaja	Vaali	
2005	Mumbai Xpress (D)	Idemi Vintha	Telugu	Ilaiyaraaja	Chandrabose	
2006	Pudhupettai	Neruppu Vaayinil	Tamil	Yuvan Shankar Raja	Na. Muthukumar	
2008	Dasavathaaram	Oh...Ho...Sanam	Tamil	Himesh Reshammiya	Vairamuthu	
2008	Dasavathaaram	Mukundha Mukundha	Tamil	Himesh Reshammiya	Vaali	
2009	Unnaipol Oruvan	Allah Jaane	Tamil	Shruti Haasan	Manushyaputhiran	
2009	Unnaipol Oruvan	Nilai Varumaa	Tamil	Shruti Haasan	Kamal Haasan	
2010	Manmadan Ambu	Dhagudu Dhattham	Tamil	Devi Sri Prasad	Kamal Haasan	
2010	Manmadan Ambu	Neela Vaanam	Tamil	Devi Sri Prasad	Kamal Haasan	
2010	Manmadha Banam (D)	Dhagulu Dhanda	Telugu	Devi Sri Prasad	Sahithi	
2010	Manmadha Banam (D)	Neelakasam	Telugu	Devi Sri Prasad	Ramajogayya Sastry	
2012	Vishwaroopam	Thuppaki Engal Tholile	Tamil	Shankar–Ehsaan–Loy	Vairamuthu	
2012	Vishwaroopam	Unnai Kaanadhu Naan	Tamil	Shankar–Ehsaan–Loy	Kamal Haasan	
2012	Vishwaroopam	Anu Vidhaiththa Boomiyile	Tamil	Shankar–Ehsaan–Loy	Kamal Haasan	
2012	Vishwaroopam (D)	Undalaenandhi Naa Kannu	Telugu	Shankar–Ehsaan–Loy	Ramajogayya Sastry	
2012	Vishwaroopam (D)	Anu Vinasa Varshamidhi	Telugu	Shankar–Ehsaan–Loy	Ramajogayya Sastry	
2012	Vishwaroop	Main Radha Tu Shaam	Hindi	Shankar–Ehsaan–Loy	Javed Akhtar	
2012	Vishwaroop	Koi Kahin	Hindi	Shankar–Ehsaan–Loy	Javed Akhtar	
2015	Uttama Villain	Single Kisske Loveaa	Tamil	Ghibran	Viveka	
2015	Uttama Villain	Uttama Introduction : Villuppattu	Tamil	Ghibran	Subhu Arumugam	
2015	Uttama Villain	Saagavaram	Tamil	Ghibran	Kamal Haasan	
2015	Uttama Villain	Iraniyan Naadagam	Tamil	Ghibran	Kamal Haasan	
2015	Uttama Villain	Mutharasan Kadhai	Tamil	Ghibran	Kamal Haasan	
2015	Uttama Villain (D)	Lavve Lavvaa	Telugu	Ghibran	Ramajogayya Sastry	
2015	Uttama Villain (D)	Thandhanatthom : Uthamudi Parichayam	Telugu	Ghibran	Ramajogayya Sastry	
2015	Uttama Villain (D)	Srushti Niyamam	Telugu	Ghibran	Ramajogayya Sastry	
2015	Uttama Villain (D)	Naa Rudhirapu Oka Thrunam : Hiranya Samhaaram	Telugu	Ghibran	Kamal Haasan	
2015	Thoongaa Vanam	Neeye Unakku Raja	Tamil	Ghibran	Vairamuthu	
2015	Cheekati Rajyam	Dhairyam Veedi Sainyam	Telugu	Ghibran	Ramajogayya Sastry	
2015	Avam	Kaarirulae	Tamil	Sundaramurthy K S	Madhan Karky	
2017	Muthuramalingam	Therkku Desa Singamadaa	Tamil	Ilaiyaraaja	Panchu Arunachalam	
2018	Vishwaroopam II	Naanaagiya Nadhimoolamae	Tamil	Ghibran	Kamal Haasan	
2018	Vishwaroop II	Tu Srotu Hai	Hindi	Ghibran	Prasoon Joshi	
2019	Happi	Zindagi Dish	Hindi	Ilaiyaraaja	Jaideep Sahni	
2020	Arivum Anbum	Pothunalam Enpathu	Tamil	Ghibran	Kamal Haasan	
2021	A Tribute to Venmurasu	Shades of Blue: A Musical Tribute to Venmurasu	Tamil	Raleigh Rajan	Jeyamohan	
2022	Vikram	Pathala Pathala	Tamil	Anirudh Ravichander	Kamal Haasan	
2022	Vikram Hitlist (D)	Mathuga Mathuga	Telugu	Anirudh Ravichander	Chandrabose	
2022	Vikram Hitlist (D)	"Badle Badle"	Hindi	Anirudh Ravichander	Raqueeb Alam	
2024	Meiyazhagan	Poren Naa Poren, Yaaro Ivan Yaaro	Tamil	Govind Vasantha	Uma Devi	

== Lyricist ==
Year	Film	Song(s)	Ref.
2000	Hey Ram	"Nee Partha"	
2000	Hey Ram	"Ram Ram"	
2002	Pammal K. Sambandam	"Kandhasamy Maadasamy"	
2004	Virumaandi	"Onnavida"	
2009	Unnaipol Oruvan	"Unnaipol Oruvan"	
2009	Unnaipol Oruvan	"Nilai Varumaa"	
2009	Unnaipol Oruvan	"Vaanam Ellai"	
2010	Manmadan Ambu	"Dhagudu Dhattham"	
2010	Manmadan Ambu	"Who's The Hero"	
2010	Manmadan Ambu	"Neela Vaanam"	
2010	Manmadan Ambu	"Kamal Kavidhai"	
2010	Manmadan Ambu	"Manmadan Ambu"	
2013	Vishwaroopam	"Unnai Kaanadhu Naan"	
2013	Vishwaroopam	"Anu Vidhaiththa Boomiyile"	
2015	Uttama Villain	"Kadhalaam Kadavul Mun"	
2015	Uttama Villain	"Saagaavaram"	
2015	Uttama Villain	"Iraniyan Naadagam"	
2015	Uttama Villain	"Mutharasan Kadhai"	
2015	Uttama Villain	"Uttaman Kadhai"	
2018	Vishwaroopam II	"Naanaagiya Nadhimoolamae"	
2018	Vishwaroopam II	"Saadhi Madham"	
2022	Vikram	"Pathala Pathala"	
2025	Thug Life	"Jinguchaa"	

== Independent works ==
Year	Song	Album	Composer	Role	Ref(s)
1999	"Chippikule Muthu Pookkal"	The Blast	Yuvan Shankar Raja	Playback Singer	
1999	"Vaa Nanbane"	The Blast	Yuvan Shankar Raja	Playback Singer	
1999	"Aval Devathai"	The Blast	Yuvan Shankar Raja	Playback Singer	
2018	Makkal Needhi Maiam	Non-album single	Vidyasagar	Playback singer, lyric writer	
2020	"Arivum Anbum"	Non-Album Single	Ghibran	Playback Singer, Lyrics writer	
2024	"Inimel"	Non-Album Single	Shruti Haasan	Lyrics writer	

== See also ==
- Kamal Haasan filmography
- List of awards and nominations received by Kamal Haasan
