= Hindu Higher Secondary School =

Coordinates: 13.061157°N 80.280147°E

- Triplicane; Chennai, Tamil Nadu; India

Information
- Motto: Satyam, Jnanam, Anantam, Brahma
- Established: 1852; 174 years ago
- Alumni: See below
- Nobel laureates: Subrahmanyan Chandrasekhar

The Hindu Higher Secondary School (HHSS), located on Big Street, Triplicane, Chennai, India, is one of the oldest secondary schools in South India, having been established in 1852. The school was founded at a time when many parents were reluctant to send their children to schools managed and run by the British, in this case, the English East India Company.

== History ==
The schools roots are in two boys' schools in the Triplicane area of Madras, the Dravida Pathasala (Pathasala means school in Sanskrit) for Tamil boys and the Hindu Balura Pathsala for Telugu boys. In 1860, these two Pathsalas were merged, the new entity being named the "Triplicane Andhra Dravida Balura Pathasala". The school was later again renamed "The Triplicane Anglo-Vernacular High School". Finally, in 1897, the school's name was changed to "Hindu High School".

=== The building ===
Construction of a large school building was completed in 1897, the L-shaped red brick building having been designed by the architect Henry Irwin. The three-storey building was constructed by Namberumal Chetty, on a plot of 40,000 square feet (3,700 m^{2}). Wide and broad verandas and big windows ensured proper ventilation, while high ceilings and rows of arches imparted an imposing look to the school building. With additional construction done over a period of time, the building is now T-shaped.

== Notable alumni ==
- G. N. Balasubramaniam, Carnatic vocalist
- Subrahmanyan Chandrasekhar, Nobel Prize–winning astrophysicist.
- Kamal Haasan, actor and filmmaker
- S. V. Ranga Rao, actor and filmmaker
