= Tamil Nadu State Film Honorary Award =

India cinema award

The Tamil Nadu State Film Award for Honorary Award given by the Tamil Nadu State Government as part of its annual Tamil Nadu State Film Awards for Tamil cinema personalities who contributed in developing the Tamil cinema in India.

== Arignar Anna Award ==
- 1990 - Manivannan, K. S. Gopalakrishnan and K. Balachander
- 1991 - A. S. Prakasam, Vietnam Veedu Sundaram
- 1992 - P. Bhanumathi, Krishnan
- 1993 - Akkineni Nageswara Rao
- 1994 - Harur Das
- 1995 - T. Rajendar
- 1996 - Liakath Ali Khan
- 1997 - C. V. Sridhar
- 1998 - S. A. Chandrasekhar, K. Swarnam
- 1999 - Mahendran
- 2000 - Anjali Devi
- 2001 - Bharathiraja
- 2002 - K. Jamuna Rani
- 2006 - Rama Narayanan

== Thiyagaraja Bhagavathar Award ==
- 1999 - S. S. Rajendran
- 2000 - M. N. Rajam
- 2001 - Vyjayanthimala
- 2002 - G. Sakunthala
- 2004- P Leela
- 2006 - T. M. Soundararajan

== Kalaivanar Award ==
- 1989 - K. A. Thangavelu
- 1992 - Vennira Aadai Moorthy, Y. G. Mahendran
- 1996 - Urvashi
- 1999 - Kaka Radhakrishnan
- 2000 - Padmini
- 2001 - Raja Sulochana
- 2002 - P. B. Sreenivas
- 2006 - Vivek

== Kannadasan Award ==
- 1999 - Kavingnar Kamakodiyan
- 2000 - S. Varalakshmi
- 2001 - Vanisri
- 2002 - M. S. Viswanathan
- 2006 - Pa. Vijay

== M.G.R. Award ==
- 1989 - Sivaji Ganesan, Kamal Haasan
- 1990 - Gemini Ganesan, Sowcar Janaki, M. N. Nambiar, Manorama
- 1991 - R. S. Manohar, Pandari Bai
- 1992 - Srividya, T. R. Ramanna
- 1993 - B. Sarojadevi
- 1994 - Vijayakanth
- 1995 - Arvind Swamy, Sathyaraj
- 1998 - Prabhu, Napoleon
- 1999 - Jamuna, Bhagyaraj
- 2000 - Vijay
- 2001 - B. S. Saroja
- 2002 - E. V. Saroja
- 2003 - Kanchana
- 2004 - Rajasree
- 2005 - Prashanth, Vikram Kennedy
- 2006 - Ajith Kumar

== Raja Sando Award ==
- 1992 - Suhasini, A. Vincent
- 1999 - S. Shankar
- 2000 - Kunnakudi Vaidyanathan
- 2001 - K. Balaji
- 2002 - M. Saravanan
- 2006 - Thangar Bachan

== Sivaji Ganesan Award ==
- 1999 - Kamal Haasan
- 2002 - M. Saroja
- 2006 - Vikram

== Paavender Bharathidasan Award ==
- 1992 - Jikki, S. Janaki
- 2006 - Thamarai

== Jayalalithaa Award ==
- 1992 - P. Vasu, Manorama, M. N. Nambiar
- 1993 - K. Balaji
