= Kanyakumari (film) =

- Promotional Poster
- Directed by: K. S. Sethumadhavan
- Written by: M. T. Vasudevan Nair
- Produced by: K. S. R. Moorthy
- Starring: Kamal Haasan; Rita Bhaduri; Murali Das
- Cinematography: P. L. Roy
- Music by: M. B. Sreenivasan
- Production company: Chithranjali Films
- Distributed by: Central Pictures
- Release date: 26 July 1974
- Country: India
- Language: Malayalam

Kanyakumari is a 1974 Indian Malayalam-language film written by M. T. Vasudevan Nair and directed by K. S. Sethumadhavan. It stars Kamal Haasan for the first time in the lead role of the protagonist and Rita Bhaduri as the female lead in her cinema debut. It was the debut film of Jagathy Sreekumar as an adult. The film deals with a sculptor who meets a girl selling bangles and pearls on the sea shore and falls in love with her.

This is the first adult role of Haasan in Malayalam language films after his appearance as a child artist in Kannum Karalum. He received his first Filmfare award for this movie.

== Plot ==
Sankaran a sculptor, who comes to Kanyakumari to work under a contractor and a group of tourists who reach the place. Sankaran falls in love with a poor vendor of necklaces made of sea shells Parvathi. An orphan Parvathi is brought up by Kannamma her maternal grandmother. Veerappan the foster son of Kannamma, keeps tormenting Parvathi, destroying the necklaces she makes. Sankaran decides to marry Parvathi once his work is complete. He hopes to leave Kanyakumari with Parvathi. In the meanwhile, Veerappan attempts to sell Parvathi to Frederick, a depraved sportsman camping at the guest house on the beach. Parvathi manages to escape this attempt.

Jayan son of a rich businessman, comes to Kanyakumari seeking solace. He happens to meet his lover Rajani, now wife of Somasundaram, a wealthy businessman. It was this broken love affair that turned Jayan into a wreck. Rajani was forced to marry the old businessman man to save her family from a financial crisis.

The immoral relationship between Frederick and the young wife of a North Indian businessman forms the sub-plot of the film. Jayan who happens to see this is threatened by Frederick and is warned not to interfere in his personal matters. Jayan makes friends with Swami, an itinerant sanyasi. Both of them take pity on Parvathi and they try to save her Veerappan and Frederick.

Events take a cruel turn. One night, Frederick accosts Parvathi while she was alone on the beach and attempts to rapes her. Sankaran who hears her screams rushes to the spot. He hits Frederick with his sculptor's hammer killing him at once. Sankaran taken away by the police and Parvathi staring at him with eyes full of tears.

== Cast ==
- Kamal Haasan as Sankaran
- Rita Bhaduri as Parvathi
- Prem Nawas as Jayan
- Sankaradi as North Indian businessman
- Murali Das as Frederick
- Veeran as Somasundaram
- Manimala as Rajani
- Pala Thankam as Kannamma
- N. Govindan Kutty as Veerappan
- Alummoodan as Bhaskaran
- Jagathy Sreekumar as Tourist
- Mallika Sukumaran as Tourist
- K. G. Menon as Swami
- O. Ramadas
- M. O. Devasia
- Ashok Kumar
- Appachan
- Maala
- Madhumathi
- Rajani
- Vijayalakshmi
- Meena Kumari
- Baby Radhika
- Sindhu
- Sherly

== Production ==
Kanyakumari was written by M. T. Vasudevan Nair, directed by K. S. Sethumadhavan, and produced by K. S. R. Moorthy under Chithranjali Films. Cinematography was handled by P. L. Roy. The entire film was shot at Kanyakumari city and surroundings. This movie was also Rita Bhaduri's debut in cinema.

== Soundtrack ==
The music was composed by M. B. Sreenivasan and the lyrics were written by Vayalar Ramavarma and M. B. Sreenivasan.

Track list
No.	Title	Lyrics	Singer(s)	Length
1.	"Aayiram Kannulla"	Vayalar Ramavarma	K. J. Yesudas, P. Leela, L. R. Eeswari & Chorus
2.	"Chandrappalungu Manimaala"	Vayalar Ramavarma	K. J. Yesudas, S. Janaki
3.	"I Am In Love"	M. B. Sreenivasan	Usha Uthup

== Release and reception ==
Kanyakumari was released on 26 July 1974. The film went on to become a box office hit. In 2014, B. Vijayakumar of The Hindu wrote, "Kamal Haasan and Rita Bhaduri impressed with their natural style of acting. Alummoodan, as a waiter in the guest house, created moments of laughter."

== Awards ==
- Filmfare Awards South
- Kamal Haasan won Filmfare Award for Best Actor – Malayalam.
