= Virumaandi =

2004 film by Kamal Haasan

- Theatrical release poster
- Directed by: Kamal Haasan
- Written by: Kamal Haasan
- Produced by: Kamal Haasan; Chandrahasan
- Starring: Kamal Haasan; Pasupathy; Napoleon; Abhirami
- Cinematography: Keshav Prakash
- Edited by: Ram Sudharsan; Kamal Haasan
- Music by: Ilaiyaraaja
- Production company: Raaj Kamal Films International
- Release date: 14 January 2004
- Running time: 178 minutes
- Country: India
- Language: Tamil

Virumaandi is a 2004 Indian Tamil-language action drama film written, co-edited, produced, and directed by Kamal Haasan, who also performed in the title role. The cast also includes Pasupathy, Napoleon, Abhirami, Rohini, Shanmugarajan and Nassar in pivotal roles. The film's score and soundtrack were composed by Ilaiyaraaja. The film won critical acclaim and was a commercial success at the box office. It marked Rohini’s comeback after an 8-year hiatus from acting.

The film revolves around the interview of two prison inmates, firstly, Kothala Thevar's (Pasupathy) life sentence, and secondly, Virumaandi (Kamal Haasan), who is sentenced to be hanged. The criminals express how they feel about the direction that their lives have taken and how they have ended up where they are. The film's narrative is based on the Rashomon effect. It was screened as "Main Programme Feature" at the International Film Festival Rotterdam, Netherlands. Kamal Haasan won the inaugural Best Asian Film Award for Virumaandi as director at the Bucheon International Fantastic Film Festival, South Korea. (Note: The European jury of eminent filmmakers said, "Virumaandi successfully manages to combine social and political drama, romance, humour, musical and spectacular action in one story of epic proportions. All the more impressive is the fact that it has been written, produced and directed by one man who also plays the lead role. It is a film that should easily appeal to audiences from all over the world." Jan Doense, filmmaker and a member of the jury gave the award to Haasan and said, "Astounding", even as he appreciated the ethnicity of the film.)

== Plot ==
Angela Kathamuthu, a civil rights activist, conducts interviews with death row inmates at Madras Central Prison for her PhD thesis against capital punishment. On her second day, amid a student protest over the suspicious prison death of an inmate named Narayanan, she interviews Kothala Thevar, who is serving a double life sentence for his involvement in a massacre that claimed 24 lives in Theni district. He shares his perspective on the events.

According to Kothala, the tragedy was driven by Virumaandi Thevar, a reckless deportee from Singapore who inherited highly fertile, water-rich ancestral land in Chinna Kolarupatti. Virumaandi allied with Kothala in a bitter feudal feud against rival landlord Nallama Nayakkar, who accidentally killed Kothala's father using his own aruval when he got into an argument with Virumaandi's father as Kothala's father tried to kill him 18 years ago. Kothala’s niece, Annalakshmi, fell in love with Virumaandi, a romance Kothala tolerated to gain control of Virumaandi's prized estate. Following an assassination attempt that Virumaandi blamed on Nayakkar, a village council verbally humiliated Kothala's faction. Kothala claims that a vengeful Virumaandi launched a nighttime raid on Nayakkar’s village, forcing Kothala’s men to intervene in a bloodbath that left 24 people dead. Kothala further alleges that Virumaandi later abducted and brutally raped Annalakshmi, driving her to hang herself. In the ensuing retaliation, Virumaandi slaughtered six of Kothala’s henchmen and murdered Nayakkar before being captured. Virumaandi's subsequent courtroom testimony betrayed Kothala's gang, landing them 15-year sentences while earning himself the death penalty.

Angela later convinces a hostile Virumaandi to share his version of the story. He reveals that Kothala was the actual mastermind who coveted his land and had previously orchestrated the attempt on his life. Annalakshmi nursed Virumaandi back to health and taught him the virtue of forgiveness. Hoping to defuse the clan war, Virumaandi went alone at night to Nayakkar’s village to apologize to the elders and Nayakkar's main henchmen, Kondarasu who humiliated Kothala by throwing his slipper at him. However, Kothala and his armed henchmen followed him and Kondarasu believing Virumaandi betrayed him, started attacking him and Kothala murdered him by pushing an agricultural tool on him which resulted in him getting stabbed. He and his men then slaughtered the remaining sleeping villagers including Kondarasu's baby who is killed by Kottaisamy leaving only the Kondarasu's wife alive as Virumaandi managed to save her. To protect Kothala’s family, a compromised Virumaandi committed perjury in court. Seeking penance, he transferred his fertile land to the victims' families, married Annalakshmi in secret, and left the village.

The following day, Kothala’s gang abducted Annalakshmi, Kothala stripped her thaali (nuptial thread), and forced her into a marriage with his nephew, Kottaisamy, with the thaali Kothala removed, to secure her property share. Driven to despair to avoid being raped by Kottaisamy, Annalakshmi hanged herself through her cow. A devastated Virumaandi infiltrated Kothala’s house in a blind fury, stabbing one of Kothala's henchmen with a spear and hacking Kottaisamy and two henchmen to death with an aruval. Kothala used his own child as a human shield to escape and has Peykkaman and the police capture Virumaandi. Virumaandi's friends helped him escape when Virumaandi manages to evade getting captured by Peykkaman and the police by unleashing Annalakshmi's cow. Nayakkar and his men later find Virumaandi, and he sheltered Virumaandi. Nayakkar also sent him to Chennai, but Kothala’s men subsequently cornered Nayakkar and Kothala murdered Nayakkar with his aruval when he tried to killed them with his gun. Using fabricated evidence from (the priest who named Virumaandi and got him married with Annalakshmi) and from Kothala and his henchmen especially Rasu Kalai Thevar, the corrupt local Inspector, Peykkaman, framed Virumaandi as the primary instigator of both massacres, resulting in the judge issuing him death sentence and Kothala a life long imprisonment despite Virumaandi's innocence and pleas from Nallama Nayakkar's mother, his wife, his son, from the woman(who let Virumandi and Annalakshmi stay in her house), and the victims' family whom Virumaandi helped. Virumaandi and Kothala then violently attack each other in the court, only for the police to intervene by knocking Virumaandi unconscious and drag him away.

As Angela prepares to leave the facility, her cameraman secretly records Peykkaman—now a Deputy Jailer running an internal drug ring—conspiring to assassinate the investigating Chief Jailer, Jayanth. The recording captures Peykkaman admitting that Virumaandi’s severe charge sheet was entirely falsified. The conspiracy triggers a violent prison riot, during which Jayanth is stabbed by one of the inmates but Jayanth manages to escape by shooting some of the inmates dead. Peykkaman then manipulates Virumandi and Kothala into capturing Angela and her assistant Girish in exchange for killing the other. However Virumandi sides with Angela and risks his life to protect Angela and secure the recorded evidence. Kothala and the other inmates chase them, resulting in Kothala managing to stab Virumandi with a knife given to him by Peykkaman's jailer as Virumandi fights him and the other inmates off. Virumandi, Angela, and Girish then escape them and accidentally reach Jayanth's hideout. Jayanth's inmates then treat Virumandi's wounds as Angela shows the recording to Jayakanth. Jayakanth then orders Virumandi to wear his hat and take his dead officer's uniforms and wear it, to deceive the other inmates and help Angela escape safely, Jayanth also tries to give his gun to Virumaandi which he refuses. As they attempt to flee the chaos, Kothala and Paykkaman's inmates attack Virumandi and Jayakanth's inmates.

Paykkaman manages to catch up with Angela after shooting one of Jayakanth's men dead in the riot, and he then kills Giresh with his gun, he also almost succeeds in killing her, only for Virumandi to kill him by throwing him off the building. Kothala then ambushes, and shoots Virumaandi with Peykkaman's gun but Virumaandi manages to subdue Kothala, he then spares his life at Angela's pleading; however, Kothala is brutally killed by Jayanth's inmates as they throw prison gate handle at him and knock him off the building by throwing a bench at him in the ensuing melee when he tried to shoot Virumandi dead again with Angela recording this incident. The police then manage to rescue Virumandi, Jayanth, and Angela who after getting rescued presents the exposing footage in court and submits a clemency petition to the President of India, arguing that Virumaandi’s actions were purely a reactive crime of passion. The narrative concludes with Angela and a heavily traumatized Virumaandi appealing on national television for a swift final judgment—either to be executed to reunite with Annalakshmi or to be freed to live a quiet life as a man Annalakshmi wanted him to be and whether death sentence should be made illegal.

== Cast ==
- Kamal Haasan as Virumandi
- Pasupathy as Kothala Thevar
- Napoleon as Nallama Nayakkar
- Abhirami as Annalakshmi
- Nassar as Chief Jailer Jayanth
- Rohini as Dr. Angela Kaathamuthu
- Shanmugarajan as Deputy Jailer Paykkaman Thevar
- S. N. Lakshmi as Supputhai, Virumaandi's grandmother
- Gandhimathi as the woman whose son committed a crime in singapore which Virumaandi accepts on his behalf resulting in him getting deported to india and lets Virumaandi and Annalakshmi stay in her house as gratitude.
- Bala Singh as Rasu Kalai Thevar
- O. A. K. Sundar as Kottaisamy Thevar
- Rajesh as Chennai Police Commissioner
- Sujatha Sivakumar as Pechi Thevar (Kothala's wife)
- Periya Karuppu Thevar as Temple Priest
- Dhiwakar as Pedarasu Nayakkar
- Pyramid Natarajan as Advocate Vaidyanathan Iyer
- Thennavan as Kondarasu Nayakkar
- G. Gnanasambandam as Jallikattu Commentator
- Karate Raja as Virumandi's friend
- Sukumar as Virumandi's friend
- Kottachi as Virumandi's friend
- Vikram Dharma as Gopal (Jail Warden)
- Sai Dheena as Jail Warden
- V. R. Krishna Iyer as himself
- Bagla as Oomayan

== Production ==
The film was launched on 18 April 2003 under the title Sandiyar (transl. Ruthless/troublesome person) at Madurai. K. Krishnasamy, the leader of Pudhiya Tamizhagam, a caste-based political organisation in Tamil Nadu protested against the title Sandiyar, citing that it might create problems. Kamal Haasan subsequently met then Chief Minister J. Jayalalithaa, and the film was later retitled Virumaandi. Shrutika was initially chosen as the lead actress, but ultimately did not continue.

For the scenes involving Jallikattu, real-life bulls were brought in and were recorded live on set using Nuendo workstation. Due to political controversy, Kamal had to shift the shoot from Madurai to Chennai. Prabhakar, art director recreated the set of Theni villages in Chennai. The filming began on 7 July 2003 at Campa Cola Grounds, Chennai.

Cinematographer Keshav Prakash, who was trained in India and the United States, was an assistant to Ravi K. Chandran in the beginning portions of Marudhanayagam. Both Kamal Haasan and Keshav Prakash tried to make the film in high definition mode but had to abandon the project due to technical snags. He and Haasan wanted to shoot the song, "Unna Vida", at nighttime, but since it was too dark, they decided to try out digital lighting where Keshav hid between the sheep with the lights to brighten the frames.

== Music ==
The music was composed by Ilaiyaraaja. The audio was launched on 8 December 2003 at Campa Cola Grounds, Chennai. The songs, "Annalakshmi" and "Sandiyare Sandiyare" are set to Shuddha Saveri raga. "Karbagraham Vitu Samy Veliyerathu" and "Maada Vilakkae" were also featured in the 2026 Tamil feature film Thaai Kizhavi.

Track listing
No.	Title	Lyrics	Singer(s)	Length
1.	"Onnavida"	Kamal Haasan, Ilaiyaraaja	Kamal Haasan, Shreya Ghoshal	6:25
2.	"Andha Kandamani"	Muthulingam	Ilaiyaraaja, Kamal Haasan, Karthik, S. N. Surendar, Tippu	3:28
3.	"Anna Lakshmi"	Ilaiyaraaja	Kamal Haasan	3:02
4.	"Sandiyare Sandiyare"	Ilaiyaraaja	Shreya Ghoshal	3:09
5.	"Karbagraham Vitu Samy Veliyerathu"	Muthulingam	Ilaiyaraaja, Kamal Haasan, Karthik Raja, S. N. Surendar, Tippu	3:23
6.	"Karumathur Katukulae"	Muthulingam	Mary, Periya Karuppu Thevar, Sukumar, Thiruvudiyan, Karunanidhi	7:00
7.	"Kombulae Poov Suthi"	Ilaiyaraaja	Kamal Haasan	5:01
8.	"Maada Vilakkae"	Muthulingam	Kamal Haasan	3:36
9.	"Magarasiyae Manna Vitu Poniyae"	Muthulingam	Theni Kunjarammal	1:20
10.	"Nethiyelae Pottu Vai"	Muthulingam	Karunanidhi, Sukumar, Thiruvudiyan	1:02
Total length:				37:26

== Release ==
The film was certified "A" (adults only) by the censor board for excessive violence. In 2015, Virumaandi was screened at the Habitat Film Festival. It was released on Amazon Prime Video on 14 January 2021.

== Reception ==
=== Critical response ===
Critics praised the screenplay and performances of the cast, but criticised the excessive violence. Sify called it "vital, sardonic and disturbing brave attempt at good cinema with a provocative message. It is an eloquent argument against capital punishment without excusing the killer for his crimes." Shobha Warrier of Rediff.com wrote, "Virumaandi is definitely a Kamal film but this one belongs to Kamal the director, not Kamal the actor." Malathi Rangarajan of The Hindu wrote "Virumaandi"s case it [..] is backed by a strong story, astute screenplay, stirring dialogue and deft direction". Malini Mannath of Chennai Online wrote, "the film yet again reveals Kamal Haasan’s undying passion for cinema, his desire and boldness to experiment, irrespective of commercial viability." G. Ulaganathan of Deccan Herald wrote, "It is a disturbing but brave attempt with a provocative message--It is an eloquent argument against capital punishment", but criticised the excessive violence. Visual Dasan of Kalki praised Haasan for screenplay and direction while also praising Prabhakar's work for recreating real prison set, Ilaiyaraaja for using songs and background score effectively in sync with the story and that their contributions lent helping hand to Haasan. Cinesouth wrote "Once again, Kamal has taken up the mantle of a director, actor and producer for the film ‘Virumandi’. The film is not exactly another experimentation, but it has ignored some aspects of commercial cinema to tell us a powerful and strong story on the screen."

=== Box office ===
The film released on 456 screens worldwide and first in Tamil cinema with crossing 400 screens. The film got the best opening among Pongal releases grossing ₹6 crores in first weekend worldwide.

=== Accolades ===
Festival	Award	Recipient	Result	Ref
Bucheon International Fantastic Film Festival, South Korea	Best Asian Film	Kamal Haasan	Won	

The European jury of eminent filmmakers said, "Virumaandi successfully manages to combine social and political drama, romance, humour, musical and spectacular action in one story of epic proportions. All the more impressive is the fact that it has been written, produced and directed by one man who also plays the lead role. It is a film that should easily appeal to audiences from all over the world." Jan Doense, filmmaker and a member of the jury gave the Best Asian Film Award to Kamal Haasan and said, "Astounding", even as he appreciated the ethnicity of the film.

== Legacy ==
Director Vetrimaaran cited Virumaandi as one of the inspirations for the screenplay for his national award-winning 2011 film Aadukalam. Director Lokesh Kanagaraj cited the film as a source of inspiration for his 2019 film Kaithi.

More than 22 years later, Kamal Haasan got the rights to and revived the original title for Virumaandi, Sandiyar, for another film of his being produced by himself and directed by S. U. Arun Kumar.
