= Rashtrapati Award =

Awards given by the President of India

- The Bharat Scouts and Guides version of the Rashtrapati Award
- Owner: President of India
- Awarded for: achievements in the field of sports, art, military, literature, cinema, culture, science and technology, or scouting

Rashtrapati Awards used to be given by the President of India, and in some cases the Prime Minister of India, for achievements in the field of sports, art, military, literature, cinema, culture, science and technology, or Scouting. The award-giving ceremony was conducted in the Rashtrapati Bhavan, the President's official residence. The awards were a part of the Indian honours system. However, after gradual systematic categorizations over a period, the awards were made independent to the field of achievement.

For example, from 1968 onwards, the Directorate of Film Festivals completely took over its charge as the governing body for National Film Awards India. Before 1968, the award in the field of best acting in Indian Cinema was given out as a Rashtrapati Award. Other examples are Rajiv Gandhi Khel Ratna for sports, National Bravery Award, Shanti Swarup Bhatnagar Prize for Science and Technology, Jnanpith Award for literature, "Maharishi Badrayan Vyas Samman" (a presidential honour for scholars younger than 40 years who have worked to bridge the ancient and the modern especially using IT).
