= Raja Paarvai =

1981 film by Singeetam Srinivasa Rao

- Theatrical release poster in Tamil
- Directed by: Singeetam Srinivasa Rao
- Written by: Ananthu; Kamal Haasan; Balakumaran; Santhana Bharathi
- Produced by: Chandrahasan; Charuhasan; Kamal Haasan
- Starring: Kamal Haasan; Madhavi
- Cinematography: Barun Mukherji
- Edited by: V. R. Kottagiri
- Music by: Ilaiyaraaja
- Production company: Haasan Brothers
- Release dates: 10 April 1981 (Tamil); 29 August 1981 (Telugu)
- Running time: 144 minutes
- Country: India
- Languages: Tamil; Telugu

Raja Paarvai (transl. Royal Gaze) is a 1981 Indian Tamil-language romance film directed by Singeetam Srinivasa Rao. It was simultaneously made and released as Amavasya Chandrudu (transl. Moon on Amavasya) in Telugu. The story was written by Kamal Haasan, for whom the film was his 100th as an actor (Note: Without counting uncredited roles and guest appearances.) and first as a producer. The score and soundtrack was composed by Ilaiyaraaja. It is loosely based on the 1972 film Butterflies Are Free. Despite being a box office failure, the film received critical acclaim, and Haasan's performance won him the Filmfare Award for Best Actor – Tamil. Thota Tharani made his debut as an art director with the film.

== Plot ==
Raghu / Chandram is a blind violinist oppressed since infancy. Nancy, a Christian, is keen on chronicling Raghu / Chandram's inspiring life as a visually impaired but independently living person. Their relationship blossoms into a romance that is supported by Nancy's grandfather. Nancy is eventually due to be married to another man selected by her father, but aided by her grandfather, escapes from the church and elopes with Raghu / Chandram.

== Cast ==
Actors		Role		Ref.
Tamil	Telugu	Role		Ref.
Kamal Haasan		Raghu / Chandram	Raghu / Chandram	
Madhavi		Nancy	Nancy	
L. V. Prasad		Nancy's grandfather	Nancy's grandfather	
Chandrahasan		Raghu / Chandram's father	Raghu / Chandram's father	
Charuhasan		Pastor	Pastor	
Y. G. Mahendran		Seenu	Chanti	
Chitra		Sulochana	Sulochana	
Radhabhai		Raghu / Chandram's nanny	Raghu / Chandram's nanny	
Nirmalamma		Nancy's grandmother	Nancy's grandmother	
Rajalakshmi Parthasarathy		The headmistress of the blind school	The headmistress of the blind school	
Dhanushkodi	Kantha Rao	Nancy's father	Nancy's father	
K. P. A. C. Lalitha	Radha Kumari	Raghu / Chandram's stepmother	Raghu / Chandram's stepmother	
V. K. Ramasamy	Raavi Kondala Rao	Sulochana's father	Sulochana's father	
—N/a	Sakshi Ranga Rao	Raghu / Chandram's houseowner	Raghu / Chandram's houseowner	
Delhi Ganesh	Ranganath	Nancy's brother	Nancy's brother	
Santhana Bharathi		Man who beats Raghu / Chandram in lift	Man who beats Raghu / Chandram in lift	
Gangai Amaran		Himself	Himself	
S. P. Balasubrahmanyam		Himself	Himself	
Gautam Kanthadai		Young Raghu / Chandram	Young Raghu / Chandram	

== Production ==
Raja Paarvai was the 100th film for Kamal Haasan as an actor, and first as producer. He also worked as a screenwriter. He produced the film along with his brothers Charuhasan and Chandrahasan under the banner Haasan Brothers. The film also marked the debut of art director Thota Tharani in Tamil cinema. It was simultaneously shot in Telugu as Amavasya Chandrudu, with principal photography for both versions taking place in 55 days. Among other locations, the film was also shot in Venus Studios. While the film is loosely based on the 1972 film Butterflies Are Free, the final scene which features Madhavi's character escaping from church in her wedding dress and joining Haasan, was inspired by The Graduate (1967). Haasan learnt to play the violin required for the role. Haasan's nephew Gautham portrayed the younger version of him in the film.

== Soundtrack ==
The soundtrack was composed by Ilaiyaraaja, while the lyrics were written by Kannadasan, Vairamuthu and Gangai Amaran. The song "Andhi Mazhai" is set in the Carnatic raga known as Vasantha, and "Vizhi Oraththu" is set in Shubhapantuvarali. For the instrumental "Modern Concerto", Viji Manuel was the keyboardist (playing the piano on arpeggio mode), while V. S. Narasimhan was the violinist. In an interview Vairamuthu said that initially the lyrics for the song "Andhi Mazhai" were "Dhiratchai madhu vazhigirathu" before being changed to the present one.

Tamil
No.	Title	Lyrics	Singer(s)	Length
1.	"Andhi Mazhai Pozhikirathu"	Vairamuthu	S. P. Balasubrahmanyam, S. Janaki, T. V. Gopalakrishnan	4:35
2.	"Modern Concerto" (Instrumental)	—	—	3:52
3.	"Azhagae Azhagu"	Kannadasan	K. J. Yesudas	4:28
4.	"Vizhi Oraththu"	Gangai Amaran	Kamal Haasan, B. S. Sasirekha	3:39
Total length:				16:34

Telugu
No.	Title	Lyrics	Singer(s)	Length
1.	"Sundaramo Sumaduramo"	Veturi	S. P. Balasubrahmanyam, S. Janaki, T. V. Gopalakrishnan
2.	"Modern Concerto" (Instrumental)	—	—
3.	"Kalake Kala Nee Andamu"	Veturi	S. P. Balasubrahmanyam

== Release ==
Raja Paarvai was released on 10 April 1981, and Amavasya Chandrudu on 29 August 1981. Despite receiving critical acclaim, the film was a box office failure, and Haasan had to work seven to eight years to recover from the loss he incurred. The 100 days celebration of the film was held at Chettiar Bungalow in AVM studio.

== Reception ==
Kalki, in its review of the Tamil version, called the story ordinary, but said the dialogues and Rao's direction polished the film and lauded Haasan's performance, adding that Prasad outshined everyone else. S. Shiva Kumar wrote in Mid-Day, "Some breath taking photography, slick editing and lilting music contribute in making Raja Parvai a clean and enjoyable movie". Reviewing the Telugu version, Gudipoodi Srihari of the magazine Sitara wrote that barring a few sequences, the film was fairly enjoyable yet inspirational. Naagai Dharuman of Anna appreciated the acting, music, cinematography and direction. Haasan won the Filmfare Award for Best Tamil Actor.

== Legacy ==
Raja Paarvai attained cult status in Tamil cinema. In Encyclopaedia of Indian Cinema, Ashish Rajadhyaksha and Paul Willemen described Srinivasa Rao's direction and Haasan's performance as "unabashedly melodramatic, milking the hero's disability for all its worth" and that Rao's zooms and cutaways underlined by "rapid and awkward editing" were "fully in evidence". In 2010, Sify included Raja Paarvai in its list, "Kamal's most memorable romantic films", where it praised Haasan and Madhavi's onscreen rapport, the visuals and the climax. In 2017, Haasan named Amavasya Chandrudu (the Telugu version of the film) as one of his 70 most favourite films and considered it superior to Raja Paarvai.

== Bibliography ==
- Devnath, Lakshmi; Parthasarathy, Rajalakshmi (2005). Mrs. Y.G.P., a class apart. PSBB Alumni Association. OCLC 70284753.
- Pal, Joyojeet (2013). Mogk, Marja Evelyn (ed.). Different Bodies: Essays on Disability in Film and Television. McFarland. ISBN 978-0-7864-6535-4. OCLC 903289648.
- Rajadhyaksha, Ashish; Willemen, Paul (1998) [1994]. Encyclopaedia of Indian Cinema. British Film Institute and Oxford University Press. ISBN 0-19-563579-5.
- Rangan, Baradwaj (2012). Conversations with Mani Ratnam. Penguin Books. ISBN 978-0-670-08520-0.
- Sundararaman (2007) [2005]. Raga Chintamani: A Guide to Carnatic Ragas Through Tamil Film Music (2nd ed.). Pichhamal Chintamani. OCLC 295034757.
