= Oru Nadigai Natakam Parkiral =

1978 film by A. Bhimsingh

- Poster
- Directed by: A. Bhimsingh
- Written by: Jayakanthan
- Based on: Oru Nadigai Natakam Parkiral by Jayakanthan
- Produced by: S. P. Rao; Valampuri Somanathan
- Starring: Lakshmi; Srikanth
- Cinematography: B. Kannan
- Edited by: A. Paul Duraisingham
- Music by: M. S. Viswanathan
- Production company: Girnar Films
- Release date: 30 June 1978
- Running time: 131–132 minutes (Note: While the runtime is listed in Encyclopaedia of Indian Cinema as 131 minutes, the version screened at the 1979 International Film Festival of India was 132 minutes long.)
- Country: India
- Language: Tamil

Oru Nadigai Natakam Parkiral (transl. An Actress Witnesses a Play) is a 1978 Indian Tamil-language romance film directed by A. Bhimsingh and written by Jayakanthan. Based on Jayakanthan's 1971 novel of the same name, the film stars Srikanth and Lakshmi, with Y. G. P., Nagesh, Thengai Srinivasan, and Mahendran in supporting roles. It revolves around a couple whose marriage is threatened by their differing views on life and people.

Oru Nadigai Natakam Parkiral was released on 30 June 1978, a posthumous release for Bhimsingh who died in January the same year. Though the film was not well received by the audience, it received acclaim from critics, and Lakshmi won the Tamil Nadu State Film Award for Best Actress. It was screened at the International Film Festival of India in 1979.

== Plot ==
Kalyani is a 33-year-old stage actress. She stages plays with her guardian Annasamy, and his son Dhamu plays the musical instruments. Kalyani lives with a servant maid Pattu. Kalyani reads popular writer/critic Rangasamy's writings and writes to him and he responds. Ranga is a widower with a young child who lives in a village. They plan to meet and Kalyani finds him attractive and Ranga likes her good character; soon they both fall in love. Annasamy advises them to get married, and Ranga agrees. However, his close relative Chinna Nayina and his wife Thotha are against him marrying an actress and suggest he instead marry his sister-in-law Sumathi, who is raising Ranga's daughter. Ranga tells Sumathi that he is planning to marry another woman, to her dismay.

Kalyani learns of Pattu and Dhamu's love and fixes their marriage. Ranga and Kalyani marry and begin their life well. After some days, they find many differences of opinions to do with their lifestyles, views on life and people. Ranga hurts Kalyani by passing a comment that life is all about acting for her, even her love and that she does not have the real feeling of love towards anyone. Kalyani feels hurt constantly thinking of this. Nayina advises Ranga to stop living in his wife's house and move to his house and tells him to stop Kalyani from acting as actresses do not have a good reputation in society. Ranga discusses this with Kalyani, but she refuses to quit her career. Ranga feels that she is self-centered and moves out to Nayina's house, which saddens Kalyani.

One day Ranga suggests to Kalyani that they continue as friends rather than husband-wife and she agrees. They meet Raghavan, a lawyer, for divorce. Raghavan seeks a reason and Ranga says they are not happy living together. Raghavan states that, as they have not completed three years of marriage, they cannot expect divorce immediately but can opt for mutual consent and they need to live separately for a year. Ranga is keen to leave Kalyani, while Kalyani suggests they live now as if they have divorced without really divorcing. Ranga refuses, stating that he now finds logic in Nayina's statement that one can be friends with a woman of equal status but cannot be a couple because a husband will always look for a wife who is lower than him in some way.

Two years pass by, and Kalyani develops tuberculosis in spinal cord leading to numbness in her legs. She takes treatment and has to use a wheelchair. Annasamy informs Ranga and he finally comes to see her. The doctor tells Ranga that it will take a few more months but Kalyani will recover. Raghavan tells Ranga that now he has a valid reason for divorce. Ranga refuses and makes it clear that he cannot use this opportunity to abandon her especially when she is in need of him emotionally. He takes care of her and apologises to her for being selfish and not understanding her love. They both attend a play of Annasamy where Kalyani dreams of getting recovered and acting again on the stage.

== Cast ==
- Lakshmi as Kalyani
- Srikanth as Ranga
- Y. G. P. as Annasamy
- Nagesh as Raghavan
- Thengai Srinivasan as Chinna Nayina
- Mahendran as Dhamu
- Sukumari as a doctor
- Gandhimathi as Thotha
- S. Rajini as Pattu
- Anandhi as Sumathi
- Bhuvanadevi as a doctor
- Vijaya as Devaki
- Baby Lakshmi as Indhu

== Production ==
Oru Nadigai Natakam Parkiral was based on the semi-autobiographical novel of the same name by Jayakanthan in 1971. A. Bhimsingh collaborated with Jayakanthan for the second time after Sila Nerangalil Sila Manithargal (1977), another film based on a Jayakanthan novel. Jayakanthan wrote the screenplay for Oru Nadigai Natakam Parkiral. The actors who were a part of Sila Nerangalil Sila Manithargal—Srikanth, Lakshmi, Y. G. Parthasarathy (credited by his initials Y. G. P.), Nagesh, and Sukumari—were cast in this film too. The film was produced by S. P. Rao and Valampuri Somanathan under Girnar Films, photographed by B. Kannan and edited by A. Paul Duraisingham. This was Bhimsingh's last film before his death.

== Soundtrack ==
The soundtrack was composed by M. S. Viswanathan, and the lyrics were written by Jayakanthan.

Song Title	Singers
"Ethanai Malargal Ethanai Nirangal"	T. M. Soundararajan, Vani Jairam
"Nadigai Paarkum Nadagam"	Jolly Abraham, B.S. Sasirekha

== Release and reception ==
Oru Nadigai Natakam Parkiral was released on 30 June 1978, a posthumous release for Bhimsingh who died in January the same year. Though the film was not well received by the audience, it received acclaim from critics. For her performance, Lakshmi won the Tamil Nadu State Film Award for Best Actress. The film was screened at the "Indian Panorama" section of the International Film Festival of India in 1979. As of August 2015, no print of the film exists.

== Bibliography ==
- Dhananjayan, G. (2014). Pride of Tamil Cinema: 1931–2013. Blue Ocean Publishers. OCLC 898765509.
- Rajadhyaksha, Ashish; Willemen, Paul (1998) [1994]. Encyclopaedia of Indian Cinema. British Film Institute and Oxford University Press. ISBN 0-19-563579-5.
