= Y. G. Madhuvanthi =

Indian educational promoter

Personal details
- Born: 6 November 1977 (age 48) Madras, Tamil Nadu, India
- Party: Bharatiya Janata Party (2020–present)
- Spouse: V. Arunkumar (divorced)
- Children: 1
- Parent: Y. G. Mahendran (father)
- Education: Loyola College, Chennai
- Profession: Actress; politician; television presenter

Y. G. Madhuvanthi (born 6 November 1977) is an Indian actress. She is the daughter of veteran Tamil actor Y. G. Mahendran. She is also a choreographer and theater director. As of mid-2020, she is an executive committee member of the Bharatiya Janata Party (Tamil Nadu State Unit).

== Personal life ==
Madhuvanthi was born on 6 November 1977 in Chennai, Tamil Nadu into a Tamil family. She is the daughter of actor and playwright Y. G. Mahendra and granddaughter of veteran playwright Y. G. Parthasarathy and educationist Rajalakshmi Parthasarathy. Her relatives include filmmaker K. Balaji, actress Vyjayanthimala and producer Latha Rajinikanth.

She is on the board of trustees of the Calibre Educational Foundation. In January 2009, she was one of fifteen women named “Women of the Year” in The Ritz Fashion Magazine.

In 2016, she made her debut in the Tamil film industry as an actress. She was married to V. Arunkumar, grandson of Gemini Ganesan and Savitri but now divorced. They have a son, Rithvik, together. As a result of sinus issues, Madhuvanti keeps her hair short.

== Politics ==
=== Bharatiya Janata Party ===
Madhuvanthi was appointed as a State executive committee member of the Tamil Nadu BJP on 3 July 2020.

== Controversies ==
Madhuvanthi took a loan of Rs. 1 crore in 2016 to buy her house at Hinduja Leyland Finance. She allegedly failed to pay Rs 1.21 lakh along with interest on the loan. Subsequently, the Metropolitan court ordered sealing of Madhuvanthi's house in a case filed by the financial institution. Accordingly, the financial institution officials, who accompanied Thenampet police to Madhuvanthi's house, sealed her on house 13 October 2021.

In April 2020, during the COVID-19 pandemic in India, Madhuvanthi faced online backlash when she claimed that turning all lights off for 9 minutes on 9 pm will kill all instances of the coronavirus with double-power during Narendra Modi's nine-minutes lighting ceremony. Many people asked the government to take action against her for spreading misinformation.

== Filmography ==
- All work is in Tamil, unless mentioned otherwise.

=== Films ===
Year	Film	Role	Notes
2016	Dharma Durai	Police officer	
2017	Kadamban		
2017	Shivalinga	CID Chief	
2020	Dharala Prabhu	Prema	
2020	Mamakiki	Madhu's mother	Released on ZEE5
2024	PT Sir	Aadhirai Arunachalam	
2026	Charukesi	Reporter	

=== Television ===
Year	Title	Role	Channel
2008	Megala	Rajeshwari	Sun TV
2018	Vani Rani	Chandrika	Sun TV
