= Karpagam =

1963 film by K. S. Gopalakrishnan

- Poster
- Directed by: K. S. Gopalakrishnan
- Written by: K. S. Gopalakrishnan
- Produced by: K. S. Sabarinathan
- Starring: See Cast
- Cinematography: M. Karnan
- Edited by: R. Devarajan
- Music by: Viswanathan–Ramamoorthy
- Production company: Amar Jothi Movies
- Release date: 15 November 1963
- Running time: 162 minutes
- Country: India
- Language: Tamil

Karpagam is a 1963 Indian Tamil-language drama film written and directed by K. S. Gopalakrishnan. The film features an ensemble cast including Gemini Ganesan, Savitri, S. V. Ranga Rao, M. R. Radha, R. Muthuraman, V. K. Ramasamy, V. Nagayya, Karikol Raju, Sheeladevi, K. R. Vijaya and Baby Shakila. In Karpagam, a rich farmer (Ranga Rao) makes his newly married daughter (Vijaya) and her husband (Ganesan) live in his house to take care of his business. Problems arise when his estranged son (Muthuraman) starts to squander his money.

Karpagam is the debut film for Vijaya who plays the title character. It was released on 15 November 1963, Diwali day, and won the National Film Award for Best Feature Film in Tamil – Certificate of Merit for the Second Best Feature Film, while Ganesan won the Chennai Film Fans' Association for Best Actor. The film was also a commercial success, running for over 100 days in theatres; from the profits earned, Gopalakrishnan built a studio named after the film. It was remade in Hindi as Rishte Naate (1965), in Telugu as Thodu Needa (1965), in Malayalam as Vishukkani (1977) and in Kannada as Muddina Aliya (1996).

== Plot ==
Nallasivam is a rich farmer who lives in the village Pillaiyarpatti with his son Rajangam and daughter Karpagam. Rajangam is married to Pankajam, daughter of the greedy Thandavam; Karpagam is married to Sundaram, a hardworking farmer from the same village. Karpagam and Sundaram continue to live with Nallasivam at his request to take care of the households and the farm.

Pankajam gives birth to a girl named Meenakshi, but she and Rajangam neglect her. Karpagam, who is childless, takes care of Meenakshi, who starts considering Karpagam and Sundaram as her parents. Unhappy to see how Rajangam is squandering money, Nallasivam hands over the administration of his properties to Sundaram. Pankajam, who has ignored her child in her formative years, is annoyed with this development and, at the instigation of Thandavam, forces Rajangam to send a legal notice to his father, asking for property settlement. Thandavam creates problems in Rajangam's family by brainwashing and misleading Pankajam and Rajangam, who blindly follow his advice.

When Meenakshi is taken away by Rajangam, causing Karpagam to fall into depression. Finally, Rajangam sends her back and Karpagam becomes happy. A bull attacks Meenakshi, and Karpagam is killed saving her. Meenakshi refuses to return to her parents and opts to stay with Nallasivam and Sundaram. Nallasivam forcibly gets his son-in-law married to his friend Subramanian's daughter Amudha, who was a friend of Karpagam, so that the child will have a mother. Sundaram and Meenakshi do not accept Amudha. Sundaram lives in the memory of his deceased wife Karpagam, roaming around like a sage. Amudha longs for the love and attention of both Sundaram and Meenakshi. Sadness prevails at home.

Meanwhile, Rajangam and Thandavam conspire to swindle Nallasivam. Thandavam, frustrated with his failure to swindle the wealth of Nallasivam's family, decides to kill Sundaram and sends goons to attack him. Both Nallasivam and Amudha come and save him, while Thandavam is arrested. In the process, Amudha gets stabbed when a goon tries to attack Sundaram. When she is almost dying, Meenakshi sings her favourite song "Athai Madi Methaiyadi" and Amudha is saved. Sundaram realises Amudha's love for Meenakshi. The family unites, while Rajangam and Pankajam repent for their actions.

== Cast ==
Male cast

- Gemini Ganesan as Sundaram
- S. V. Ranga Rao as Nallasivam, Karpagam and Rajangam’s father.
- M. R. Radha as Thandavam
- R. Muthuraman as Rajangam
- V. K. Ramasamy as the accountant
- V. Nagayya as Subramanian, Amudha’s father
- Karikol Raju as a village farmer
- S. V. Sahasranamam (guest appearance)

Female cast

- Savitri as Amudha
- Sheeladevi as Pankajam
- K. R. Vijaya as Karpagam
- Baby Shakila as Meenakshi

== Production ==
Karpagam is the feature film debut of K. R. Vijaya. It was written and directed by K. S. Gopalakrishnan, and produced by K. S. Sabarinathan under Amar Jothi Movies. The lead role was originally offered to M. G. Ramachandran, who agreed to act in the film if T. S. Balaiah was cast as the character's father-in-law; as S. V. Ranga Rao was already cast and Gopalakrishnan refused to recast the role, Ramachandran declined, and Gemini Ganesan was cast instead. The role of the title character was originally offered to C. R. Vijayakumari, who declined. Vijaya, then known by her birth name Deivanayaki, had given a dance performance at an event in Island Grounds which Ganesan attended. They took a photograph together, which Ganesan later showed to Gopalakrishnan, who wanted a newcomer for the role. Sabarinathan took a loan of ₹4 million (equivalent to ₹330 million or US$3.4 million in 2023) from AVM Productions to produce the film. Cinematography was handled by M. Karnan, and editing by R. Devarajan. The final length of the film was 4,567 metres (14,984 ft).

== Soundtrack ==
The soundtrack was by Viswanathan–Ramamoorthy and lyrics were written by Vaali. P. Susheela is the only playback singer featured on the soundtrack. The songs "Athai Madi Methaiyadi" and "Mannavane Azhalama Kanneerai" attained popularity.

Track listing
No.	Title	Singer	Length
1.	"Aayiram Iravugal Varuvathundu"	P. Susheela	4:14
2.	"Athai Madi Methaiyadi"	P. Susheela	5:40
3.	"Pakkathu Veettu Paruva Machaan"	P. Susheela	6:01
4.	"Mannavane Azhalama Kanneerai"	P. Susheela	3:48
Total length:			19:43

== Release and reception ==
Karpagam was released on 15 November 1963, Diwali day. Ananda Vikatan, in its review dated 8 December 1963, positively the film, describing Ranga Rao's performance as the highlight of the film. The reviewer also appreciated Vijaya's performance and lauded that of Shakila. According to the reviewer, the film's only weakness was that it was stretched like rubber in the second half. T. M. Ramachandran, writing for Sport and Pastime, appreciated the film for various aspects, particularly the cast performances, but was disappointed over Savitri's limited role. Kanthan of Kalki called the story ordinary, but lauded Gopalakrishnan's direction. The film was a commercial success, running for over 100 days in theatres. It won the National Film Award for Best Feature Film in Tamil – Certificate of Merit for the Second Best Feature Film, and Ganesan won the Chennai Film Fans' Association for Best Actor.

== Remakes ==
Karpagam was remade in Hindi as Rishte Naate (1965), and in Telugu as Thodu Needa (1965), where S. V. Ranga Rao and V. Nagayya reprised their roles. It was remade in Malayalam as Vishukkani (1977) and in Kannada as Muddina Aliya (1996).

== Legacy ==
From the profits the film made, Gopalakrishnan built Karpagam Studio. Though Vijaya feared she would not get further acting offers due to her character's early death in Karpagam which she considered a "bad omen", she went on to act in more than 500 films. The film is available for viewing on Amazon Prime Video.

== Bibliography ==
- Dhananjayan, G. (2011). The Best of Tamil Cinema, 1931 to 2010: 1931–1976. Galatta Media. OCLC 733724281.
- Rajadhyaksha, Ashish; Willemen, Paul (1998) [1994]. Encyclopaedia of Indian Cinema. British Film Institute and Oxford University Press. ISBN 0-19-563579-5.
