= Charukesi (disambiguation) =

Charukesi is a Carnatic raga.

Charukesi may also refer to:

- Charukesi (play), first staged in 2021
- Charukesi (film), based on the play
