= Velukkudi Krishnan =

Hindu religious scholar

Velukkudi Krishnan (born on 16 Aug 1963), sometimes rendered U. V. Velukkudi Krishnan Swamigal, is a Hindu Sri Vaishnava religious scholar.

== Biography ==
Krishnan was born in the village of Velukkudi in present-day Thiruvarur district. His preceptor is Sholinghur Sri Doddacharyan Swamigal from the lineage of the acharya associated with the Doddacharyar Sevai in the Kanchipuram Varadaraja Swami Garuda sevai. He delivers lectures in person, distributes them on compact disc and MP3, and broadcasts them on TV channels of Vijay TV, Sri Venkateswara Bhakthi Channel 2 Tamil (SVBC 2 Tamil) and Podhigai TV. His program called 'guru parampara' in svbc 2 Tamil, broadcast across Tamil Nadu. He operates the Kinchitkaram Trust, which translates, publishes, and distributes religious materials, conducts classes, and locates and maintains temples and other religious and historic sites. He is known for his meticulous and chaste rendering of the Vedas, the Upanishads, Naalayira Divya Prabandham, and the Puranas, frequently including human perspectives in his upanyasams.

Krishnan's father, Velukkudi Varadachariar, was also noted as a Vedic scholar. Krishnan was given both a religious and latest education, after which he went to work as a chartered accountant. After his father's death in 1991, the 28-year-old Krishnan began delivering lectures. Finding that his accounting career conflicted with his religious life, he left his job in 1996 to devote himself full-time to religious work.

Krishnan speaks Sanskrit, Tamil, and English, and lectures and distributes recordings in both of the latter languages. He has lectured in a number of foreign countries, including the United States, Canada, the UK, Singapore, UAE, Bahrain, Australia, and Oman. He lives in the temple city of Srirangam in Tamil Nadu.
