= Kathai Kathaiyam Karanamam =

- Theatrical release poster
- Directed by: Y. G. Mahendran
- Screenplay by: Y. G. Mahendran
- Based on: [Im]perfect Murder by P. V. Y. Raman
- Produced by: K. Narayanan
- Starring: Jaishankar; Rajeev; Y. G. Mahendran; Pallavi
- Cinematography: Babu
- Edited by: G. Murali
- Music by: M. S. Viswanathan
- Production company: Sree Lakshmi Jothi Movies
- Distributed by: Mangaadu Amman Films
- Release date: 18 September 1987
- Country: India
- Language: Tamil

Kathai Kathaiyam Karanamam (transl. Stories, stories and the reasons for them) is a 1987 Indian Tamil-language film written and directed by Y. G. Mahendran. It is based on the play [Im]perfect Murder by P. V. Y. Raman. The film stars Jaishankar, Rajeev, Mahendran and Pallavi. It was released on 18 September 1987.

== Cast ==
- Jaishankar
- Rajeev
- Y. G. Mahendran
- Radha Ravi
- Vennira Aadai Moorthy
- Madhu Mohan
- Typist Gopu
- Suppuni
- Gautham
- Pallavi
- Manorama
- K. Vijaya
- Mrs YGP (special appearance)
- Visu

== Production ==
Kathai Kathaiyam Karanamam is based on the English-language play [Im]perfect Murder, written by P. V. Y. Raman and staged by United Amateur Artistes. Chithralaya Gopu wrote the dialogues for the film adaptation. The film's producer Lakshmi Jothi films who saw the play decided to adapt into the film and insisted Mahendran to direct the film. A scene with Rajeev and Pallavi was shot at Mahendran's home.

== Soundtrack ==
The music was composed by M. S. Viswanathan. The album was released under the label AVM Music.

Track listing
No.	Title	Lyrics	Singer(s)	Length
1.	"Kaval Thurayin Nayagane"	Vaali	S. P. Balasubrahmanyam, Vani Jairam	5:11
2.	"Yen Gnyabhakam Inguvarakootum"	Vaali	S. P. Balasubrahmanyam, P. Susheela	4:35
3.	"Kaiyai Thanthen Thottukolla"	Vairamuthu	P. Jayachandran, Vani Jairam	4:54
4.	"Thudikidu Thudikidu Ilam Manam"	Vairamuthu	S. P. Balasubrahmanyam, K. S. Chithra	5:56
Total length:				20:36

== Release and reception ==
A preview of Kathai Kathaiyam Karanamam was held on 10 September 1987. The film was released in theatres on 18 September by Mangaadu Amman Films. BR of The Indian Express appreciated Mahendran's direction, Viswanathan's music and Babu's cinematography, but felt Jaishankar was "wooden more often than not, melodramatic otherwise."
