= Praveena Bhagyaraj =

Indian actress (died 1983)

- Born: Praveena
- Died: September 1983
- Occupation: Actress
- Years active: 1976–1983
- Spouse: K. Bhagyaraj (m. 1981)

Praveena Bhagyaraj (died 1983) was an Indian actress who had worked mainly in Tamil, Telugu, Malayalam and Kannada films. She married director K. Bhagyaraj in 1981. Praveena starred in several films like Manmatha Leelai, Manthoppu Kiliye, Pasi, Billa and Bhama Rukmani.

== Film career ==
She made her debut in 1976 in the Tamil movie Manmadha Leelai, directed by K. Balachander, with Kamal Haasan in the lead role. After that, she has acted in films as supporting roles and minor roles, and also lead actress in a few movies. She has acted with Rajinikanth in Billa (1980). Billa was released on 26 January 1980, and became a commercial success, running for over 25 weeks in theatres.

== Personal life ==
In her early days, both Praveena and Bhagyaraj had a lot of trouble getting film offers. Praveena entered as an actress in the film industry. Praveena helped her boyfriend Bhagyaraj, who had little chance of progressing as the second hero and main supporting characters. When Bhagyaraj taught Tamil to Praveena, they fell in love. They got married in 1981.

== Death ==
Praveena died in September 1983 due to jaundice.

== Filmography ==
Year	Film	Role	Language	Notes
1976	Manmatha Leelai		Tamil	Debut in Tamil - Uncredited role
1977	Manassoru Mayil		Malayalam	
1977	Choondakkari		Malayalam	
1978	Seethapathi Samsaram		Telugu	
1978	Amarnath		Kannada	
1978	Mattoru Karnan		Malayalam	
1978	Vishwaroopam		Malayalam	
1978	Taxi Driver		Tamil	
1978	Aval Kanda Lokam		Malayalam	
1978	Sathrusamhaaram		Malayalam	
1979	Manthoppu Kiliye	Jayanthi	Tamil	
1979	Kalliyankattu Neeli		Malayalam	
1979	Aasaikku Vayasillai		Tamil	
1979	Manavadharmam		Malayalam	
1979	Avalude Prathikaram		Malayalam	
1979	Adukku Malli		Tamil	
1979	Mayandi		Tamil	
1979	Kizhakkum Merkkum Santhikkindrana		Tamil	
1979	Pasi	Kumudha	Tamil	
1980	Billa	Rupa	Tamil	
1980	Jamboo		Tamil	
1980	Neerottam		Tamil	
1980	Muthuchippikal		Malayalam	
1980	Kaavalmaadam		Malayalam	
1980	Bhama Rukmani	Rukmani	Tamil	
1980	Deepam		Malayalam	
1981	Thakilu Kottampuram		Malayalam	
1982	Anuraagakkodathi		Malayalam	
1983	Mazha Nilaavu		Malayalam	
