= Rishtey =

Rishtey may refer to:

- Rishtey (2002 film), an Indian Hindi drama film
- Rishtey (TV series), a Zee TV television series
- Rishtey (TV channel), rebranded as Colors Rishtey, an Indian general entertainment channel
  - Rishtey Cineplex, rebranded as Colors Cineplex Superhits, an Indian movie channel

== See also ==
- Reshte, a type of noodles
- Rishte Naate, a 1965 Indian film by K. S. Gopalakrishnan
