= Penn Ondru Kanden =

- Theatrical release poster
- Directed by: Gopu
- Screenplay by: Chari (dialogues)
- Story by: Moulee
- Produced by: Venkatesan; Sundaram; Periyasami
- Starring: Muthuraman; Prameela
- Cinematography: K. S. Bhaskar Rao
- Edited by: N. M. Sankar
- Music by: M. S. Viswanathan
- Production company: Sangeetha Films
- Distributed by: Gemini Studios
- Release date: 11 July 1974
- Country: India
- Language: Tamil

Penn Ondru Kanden (pronounced [peɳ onru kaɳɖeːn] transl. I saw a girl) is a 1974 Indian Tamil-language film directed by Gopu. The film stars Muthuraman and Prameela, with Nagesh, M. R. R. Vasu, I. S. R. and Sukumari in supporting roles. It was released on 11 July 1974.

== Cast ==
- Muthuraman
- Prameela
- Nagesh
- M. R. R. Vasu
- I. S. R.
- Sukumari
- M. Bhanumathi
- Y. G. Mahendran

== Production ==
Penn Ondru Kanden is titled after a song from Padithal Mattum Podhuma (1962). The dialogues were written by Chari from a story by Moulee. The film was launched in November 1973 at Vijaya Studios. Y. G. Parthasarathy switched on the camera and the scenes with Muthuraman and Pramila were shot the same day.

== Soundtrack ==
The music was composed by M. S. Viswanathan, with lyrics by Vaali.

Track listing
No.	Title	Singer(s)	Length
1.	"Om Ennum"	P. Susheela
2.	"Nee Oru Raaga Maaligai"	S. P. Balasubrahmanyam
3.	"Kaathirunthen"	S. P. Balasubrahmanyam, P. Susheela
4.	"Yaarthaan Ingay"	L. R. Eswari, Sai Baba

== Release and reception ==
Penn Ondru Kanden was released on 11 July 1974, and distributed by Gemini Studios. Kanthan of Kalki appreciated the performances of the cast members, including Muthuraman, Prameela and Vasu. Navamani praised the acting, humour and direction.
