= Aasaikku Vayasillai =

- Poster
- Directed by: Chithralaya Gopu
- Written by: Chithralaya Gopu
- Based on: Vaidehi Kaathirundhal by Chithralaya Gopu
- Produced by: A. S. N. Gandhi
- Starring: R. Muthuraman; K. R. Vijaya; Praveena
- Cinematography: Benjamin
- Edited by: N. M. Sankar
- Music by: M. S. Viswanathan
- Production company: Shanmugamani Cine Enterprise
- Release date: 16 March 1979
- Country: India
- Language: Tamil

Aasaikku Vayasillai (transl. Desire is ageless) is a 1979 Indian Tamil-language romantic comedy film written and directed by Chithralaya Gopu. It is based on his play Vaidehi Kaathirundhal (transl. Vaidehi waited). The film stars R. Muthuraman, K. R. Vijaya and Praveena. It was released on 16 March 1979.

== Cast ==
- R. Muthuraman as a businessman
- K. R. Vijaya as the businessman's wife
- Praveena as a singer
- S. A. Ashokan
- Cho Ramaswamy
- I. S. R.
- Mahendran
- Gemini Mali
- Veera Raghavan
- Hema Chaudhary

== Production ==
Aasaikku Vayasillai was adapted from the stage play Vaidehi Kaathirundhal starring Cho Ramaswamy and directed by Chithralaya Gopu who also directed the film adaptation. Cinematography was handled by Benjamin, and editing by N. M. Sankar.

== Soundtrack ==
The music was composed by M. S. Viswanathan. The title song attained popularity.

Track listing
No.	Title	Lyrics	Singer(s)	Length
1.	"Naan Ramanai"	Vaali	Vani Jairam, P. Jayachandran
2.	"Mambalathu Poosari"	Vaali	Manorama
3.	"Kuzhaludhum Kannan"	Udayanan	Vani Jairam
4.	"Aasaikku Vayasillai"	Vaali	M. S. Viswanathan, L. R. Anjali, Kousalya, Rukmani, Lalitha

== Reception ==
Kausigan of Kalki praised the performances of star cast and concluded saying if you want to forget yourself and laugh, you can forget your age and go to this film to solve that desire.
