= Naalumanippookkal =

- Directed by: K. S. Gopalakrishnan
- Written by: K. S. Gopalakrishnan; Thoppil Bhasi (dialogues)
- Screenplay by: Thoppil Bhasi
- Produced by: T. R. Srinivasan
- Starring: Madhu; Sreedevi; Kaviyoor Ponnamma; Adoor Bhasi; Pattom Sadan; MG Soman
- Cinematography: R. N. Pillai
- Edited by: N. Gopalakrishnan
- Music by: G. Devarajan; Lyrics: Bichu Thirumala
- Production company: Charuchithra Films
- Distributed by: Charuchithra Films
- Release date: 12 May 1978
- Country: India
- Language: Malayalam

Naalumanippookkal is a 1978 Indian Malayalam film, directed by K. S. Gopalakrishnan and produced by T. R. Srinivasan. The film stars Madhu, Sreedevi, Kaviyoor Ponnamma, Adoor Bhasi Pattom Sadan and M. G. Soman in the lead roles. The film has musical score by G. Devarajan.

== Cast ==
- Madhu
- Kaviyoor Ponnamma
- Adoor Bhasi
- Pattom Sadan
- Sreedevi
- Aranmula Ponnamma
- M. G. Soman

== Soundtrack ==
The music was composed by G. Devarajan and the lyrics were written by Bichu Thirumala.

No.	Song	Singers	Lyrics	Length (m:ss)
1	"Aaro Paadi"	K. J. Yesudas	Bichu Thirumala	
2	"Ambambo Jeevikkan"	C. O. Anto, Kottayam Santha	Bichu Thirumala	
3	"Chandanappoonthennal"	P. Madhuri	Bichu Thirumala	
4	"Chandanappoonthennal"	P. Susheela	Bichu Thirumala	
5	"Pulariyum Pookkalum"	P. Madhuri	Bichu Thirumala	
