= Y. G. Mahendran =

Indian actor, dramatist, singer, playwright, comedian (b. 1950)

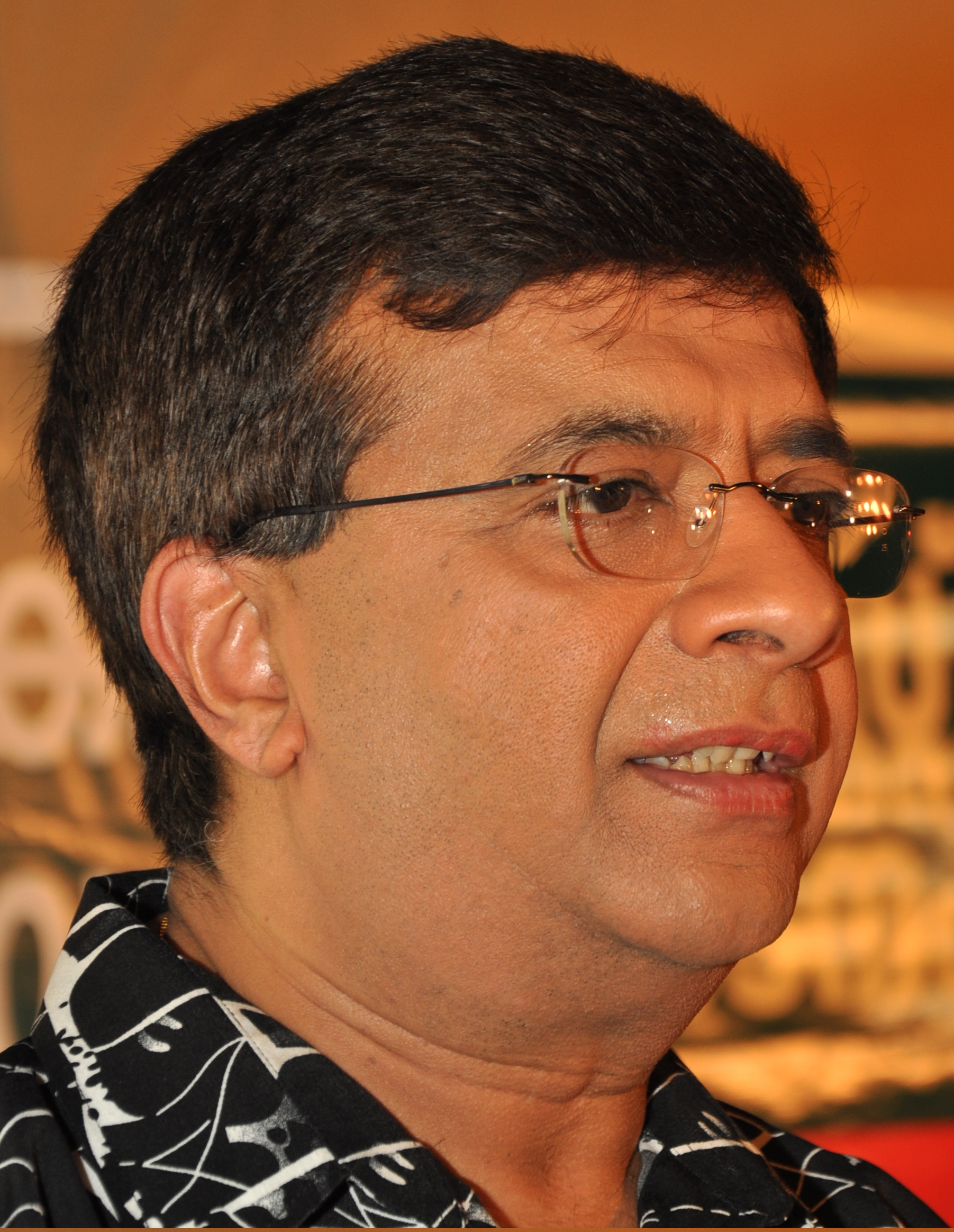
- Born: Yecha Gunja Mahendran; 9 January 1950 (age 76); Madras, Madras State, Dominion of India
- Occupations: Actor; dramatist; singer; playwright; comedian
- Years active: 1970–present
- Spouse: Sudha Mahendra (m. 1975)
- Children: 2, including Madhuvanti Arun
- Parents: Y. G. Parthasarathy (father); Rajalakshmi Parthasarathy (mother)
- Relatives: Ravi Raghavendra (brother-in-law); Latha Rajinikanth (sister-in-law); See Vyjayanthimala family

Yecha Gunja Mahendran (born 9 January 1950), also known as Y. G. Mahendra, is an Indian actor, dramatist, singer, playwright and comedian from the state of Tamil Nadu. He has acted in a number of plays and films. He is the son of Y. G. Parthasarathy, one of the pioneers of modern Tamil drama and Rajalakshmi Parthasarathy, founder and dean of Padma Seshadri Bala Bhavan group of schools, and nephew of veteran Tamil filmmaker K. Balaji. Mahendran is also the cousin of actress Vyjayanthimala and the co-brother of Rajinikanth and Mohanlal.

== Early life and family ==
Y. G. Mahendran was born on 9 January 1950 to Y. G. Parthasarathy and Y. G. Rajalakshmi. Y. G. P. founded the United Amateur Artists (UAA), one of the first drama companies in Madras city, in the year 1952. His drama company was a success and he emerged as one of the foremost dramatists of his era. Mahendran's mother Mrs. Rajalakshmi (also called Mrs. Y.G.P.) was the founder of the Padma Seshadri Group of Schools. Starting from modest beginnings in a thatched shed in the terrace of the Y.G.P. home in 1959 with a batch of eleven students as an act of social service for the members of the Nungambakkam Recreation Club the school has since emerged as one of the best schools in India.

Hailing from a family of stage-lovers, Mahendran soon developed a liking for drama from his early days. He played the part of comedian in school plays and earned acclaim. On completion of his schooling from Don Bosco Egmore, he studied Chemical Engineering at A. C. College of Technology, Guindy and MBA. During his college days, he was touted as a prospective film actor. He was in his early teens when he joined his father's drama troupe, the United Amateur Artists (UAA). This gave him the desired break. His first few plays were huge successes attracting audiences by thousands. Mahendran's name had become one of the prominent names in the city. Eventually, he had to choose between acting and his career and he chose the former.

Y.G. Mahendran's daughter Madhuvanthi was married to V. Arunkumar, the grandson of actors Gemini Ganesan and Savitri.

== Career ==
In 1970, Mahendran was cast by director K. Balachander in the latter's film Navagraham. The film was an average grosser. Mahendran was discovered to have a nasal voice. He acted in a variety of roles in a number of movies – particularly as a dim witted fool of a cousin – generally eclipsing roles enjoyed by Cho Ramaswamy in the 1960s and 1970s. He shared screen space with actors including Sivaji Ganesan, Jaishankar, Rajinikanth and Kamal Haasan. He thanked K. Balachander, Kalakendra Govindrajan and actor Srikanth for introducing him in the industry, and said that he wouldn't have attained this height without fans. He had also been part of many television series.

== Political opinion ==
=== Speech on CAA ===
Mahendran made reference to the ongoing Citizenship Amendment Act protests across India and the involvement of the student community and said the students go to the protests because they can get a leave on the day and they can cause ruckus and to check out the women standing in the crowd. His statements were criticized by different sections on social media. Singer Chinmayi criticised his comments and said, "Comments from men such as Y. G. Mahendran has to be brushed aside, because it's a waste of time speaking about them.

== Business ==
Mahendran, thanks to his brother in law, also began a parallel career in industrial ceramics and had a flourishing company established in 1982. He sold his ceramics business in 2001 for a whopping sum and has made a comeback into production and acting.

== Filmography ==
=== Tamil films ===
List of Y. G. Mahendran Tamil film credits
Year	Title	Role	Notes
1970	Navagraham	Anumanthu	
1971	Nootrukku Nooru	Mahesh	
1973	Gauravam	Kannan's driver	
1974	Dheerga Sumangali	Sikhamani	
1974	Penn Ondru Kanden		
1974	Dikkatra Parvathi		
1975	Anbe Aaruyire	Lawrence	
1976	Manmadha Leelai	Petition Kodhandam	
1976	Paalooti Valartha Kili		
1976	Uravadum Nenjam		
1976	Ilaya Thalaimurai	Balbeer Singh	
1977	Dheepam		
1977	Thani Kudithanam	Narayanan	
1977	Penn Jenmam		
1977	Bhuvana Oru Kelvi Kuri	Muthu	
1978	Andaman Kadhali	Madhan's friend	
1978	Kaatrinile Varum Geetham	Flight passenger	
1978	Shankar Salim Simon	Mahesh	
1978	Oru Nadigai Natakam Parkiral	Dhamu	
1978	En Kelvikku Enna Bathil	Servant of Sivaraman	
1978	Idhu Eppadi Irukku	Anand	
1979	Neeya?	Martin	
1979	Thaayillamal Naan Illai	Drama artist	
1979	Dharma Yuddham		Guest appearance
1979	Imayam		
1979	Mangala Vaathiyam		
1979	Annai Oru Aalayam		
1979	Adukku Malli		
1980	Bhama Rukmani	Mounaguru	Guest appearance
1980	Rishi Moolam		
1980	Yamanukku Yaman		
1980	Guru	Mahesh	
1980	Murattu Kalai	Kaalaiyan's first brother	
1981	Kazhugu	Gopi	
1981	Savaal	Johny	
1981	Raja Paarvai	Seenu	
1981	Keezh Vaanam Sivakkum		
1981	Ellam Inbamayyam	Pazhani	
1982	Pokkiri Raja	Chandran	
1982	Vaa Kanna Vaa	Krishnamoorthy	
1982	Moondram Pirai	Srinivas's friend	
1982	Iniyavale Vaa		
1982	Thanikattu Raja	Ravi	
1982	Simla Special	Vasu	
1982	Sangili		
1982	Sakalakala Vallavan	Poonai	
1982	Thyagi		
1982	Rani Theni		Guest appearance
1982	Theerpugal Thiruththapadalam	Kamal	
1982	Nadodi Raja		
1982	Paritchaikku Neramaachu	Varadhukutty and Anand	
1982	Pagadai Panirendu	Vishnu	
1982	Adhisaya Piravigal	Kathamuthu	
1982	Nenjangal		
1983	Paayum Puli	Mahi	
1983	Neethibathi	Anthony	
1983	Uruvangal Maralam	Ramalingam	
1983	Urangatha Ninaivugal	Raghavan	
1983	Thudikkum Karangal	Babu	
1983	Soorapuli		
1983	Sattam	M. L. Anandharaman	
1983	Sivappu Sooriyan	Vidhyasagar	
1983	Sumangali	Gopal	
1983	Miruthanga Chakravarthi		
1983	Vellai Roja	Constable Perumal Naidu	
1983	Kodugal Illatha Kolam		
1983	Villiyanur Matha	Gopal	
1984	Thiruppam		
1984	Vetri	Appusami	
1984	Tharaasu		
1984	Vaazhkai	Anwar	
1984	Nenjathai Allitha		
1984	Sattathai Thiruthungal		
1984	Kai Kodukkum Kai	Narayana	
1984	Neengal Kettavai	James	
1984	Veetuku Oru Kannagi	Criminal Lawyer Mahendran	
1984	Alaya Deepam		
1984	Pudhumai Penn		
1984	Anbulla Rajinikanth		
1984	Pillaiyar		
1984	Vaai Sollil Veeranadi		
1984	Nallavanuku Nallavan	Thakkali	
1984	Vamsa Vilakku	Peter	
1984	Vai Pandal	Diwakar's friend	
1984	Kudumbam		Guest appearance
1984	Puthiya Sangamam		
1984	Ambigai Neril Vanthaal		
1985	Nalla Thambi		
1985	Anthasthu		
1985	Pudhu Yugam		
1985	Vellai Manasu		
1985	Padikkadha Pannaiyar		
1985	Poi Mugangal		
1985	Naan Sigappu Manithan	Harichandran	
1985	Needhiyin Nizhal	Unni	
1985	Un Kannil Neer Vazhinthal...	Babu	
1985	Nermai	Govindan	
1985	Andha Oru Nimidam	Balu	
1985	Aduthathu Albert	Baasha	
1985	Viswanathan Velai Venum		
1985	Uyarndha Ullam	Jambu	
1985	Sri Raghavendrar	Guru Sri Sudeendrar's disciple	
1985	Raja Rishi	Agni Deva	
1986	Marumagal	Jagadish	
1986	Poi Mugangal	Vasanth	
1986	Vasantha Raagam		
1986	Iravu Pookkal		
1986	Annai En Deivam	Appu	
1986	Engal Thaikulame Varuga		
1986	Dharma Devathai		
1987	Sankar Guru	Dharmaraj	
1987	Anbulla Appa		
1987	Anand		
1987	Kathai Kathaiyam Karanamam	Vitten	Also director
1987	Kavalan Avan Kovalan	Himself	Guest appearance
1987	Thalidhanam		
1988	Thaimel Aanai	Punyakodi	
1988	Illam		
1989	Andru Peytha Mazhaiyil	Vinodh	
1989	Thalaippu Seithigal		
1990	Mounam Sammadham	Adv. J. Shekar	
1991	Thambikku Oru Pattu		
1991	Paattondru Ketten		
1993	Karpagam Vanthachu	Sarathi	
1994	Sakthivel		
1994	Veera	Kesavan	
1995	En Pondatti Nallava		
1996	Minor Mappillai	Movie director	
2000	Hey Ram	Yagyam	
2006	Jambhavan	CBI officer Ganapathy	
2006	Kusthi	Vayram	
2007	Adavadi	Bharath's father	
2007	Sringaram	Gurukkal	
2008	Pandhayam	Dr. Pitchaimuthu	
2008	Seval	Panjami Iyer	
2009	Indira Vizha	Advocate	
2009	Kanthaswamy	Ganganathan	
2010	Pen Singam		
2010	Anandhapurathu Veedu	Bala's father's friend	
2010	Naane Ennul Illai		
2011	Ilaignan	Chettiar	
2011	Yudham Sei	Doctor Prushoththaman	
2011	Deiva Thirumagal	Ragunathan	
2011	Venghai	Professor	
2012	Marupadiyum Oru Kadhal	Jeeva's father	
2012	Vachathi		
2013	Puthran		
2013	Thalaivaa	Lawyer Radhakrishnan	
2014	Gramam	Burma Ambi Swami	
2014	Vallinam	Venkatachalam	
2014	Ramanujan	S. Narayana Iyer	Simultaneously shot in English
2014	Irukku Aana Illai	Dr. Mathrubootham	
2014	Megha		
2014	Nerungi Vaa Muthamidathe	Subramaniyam	
2015	Oru Kilo Taxi	Swami	Short Film
2015	9 Thirudargal		
2015	Yatchan	Maindhan	
2016	Kanithan	COE Chandrasekaran	
2016	Aagam	Acharya	
2016	Meen Kuzhambum Mann Paanaiyum		Guest appearance
2016	Saithan	Dinesh's boss	
2017	Bairavaa	Bank manager Venkatesan	
2017	Saaya		
2017	Kadamban		
2017	Inayathalam	I.G Sabapathy	
2017	Anbanavan Asaradhavan Adangadhavan	"Current" Murugan	
2017	Velaikkaran	Narayanan	
2018	Aaruthra	Ramanujam	
2019	Petta	College principal	
2019	Goko Mako	Natchatrian	
2020	Indha Nilai Maarum	Lawyer Adhithyan	
2020	Oh Andha Naatkal	GKB	
2021	Rudra Thandavam	Ramachandran	
2021	Maanaadu	Paranthaaman	
2021	Ikk		
2022	Jiivi 2	Psychiatrist	
2022	Mugamariyaan		
2023	Tamilarasan	Arthanaari	
2023	Theerkadarishi	Dr. Iniyan	
2023	Pichaikkaran 2	M. Krishna Iyer	
2023	Custody	Party President	
2023	Appatha	Azhagu Sundaram's manager	Uncredited
2023	Kick	MJ's father	
2023	Mark Antony	Gowri	
2024	Singapore Saloon	Vichu	
2024	Rathnam	Rathnam's grandfather	
2024	The Greatest of All Time	R.A.W. Officer	Cameo appearance
2024	Jolly O Gymkhana	Thangasamy	
2025	Kooran	Parthasarathy	
2025	Red Flower		
2026	Anantha	Mahadevan	
2026	Draupathi 2		
2026	Vengeance		
2026	Nee Forever	Ajay's grandfather	
2026	Manithan Deivamagalam	MLA	
2026	Charukesi	Charukesi	
2026	Mookuthi Amman 2	Matadipathi Jayadevar	

=== Telugu films ===
List of Y. G. Mahendran Telugu film credits
Year	Title	Role	Notes
1979	Karthika Deepam		
1979	Amma Evarikaina Amma	Drunkard	
1981	Amavasya Chandrudu	Chanti	
1983	Tarzan Sundari	Sambo	
1984	Jagan	Mahendra	
1985	Alaya Deepam		
1985	Surya Chandra	Kabir	
1987	America Abbayi	Pradeep's friend	
1987	Athagaru Zindabad	Dr. Pasupathy	
1987	Chinnari Devatha	Dharmaraj	
1988	Veguchukka Pagatichukka		Dubbed in Tamil as Edutha Sabatham Mudippen
1989	Ajatha Satruvu	Chanti Babu	
1989	Krishna Gari Abbayi		
1992	Thummeda		
1993	Jeevana Vedam		
2023	Custody	Party president	

=== Malayalam films ===
List of Y. G. Mahendran Malayalam film credits
Year	Title	Role	Notes
1979	Maalika Paniyunnavar	Krishnan Mesthiri	
1979	Velicham Vitharunna Penkutty	Swami	
1983	Oomakkuyil		Lead role
1990	Naale Ennundengil		
1992	Ente Tution Teacher		
1997	Kaduva Thomas	Gajendran	
2011	Doubles	Piyari Sayip	
2012	Namma Gramam	Burma Ambi Swami	
2020	Shyamaragam	Ramanaadha Bhagavathar	
2024	Varshangalkku Shesham	Swaminathan	

=== Hindi films ===
List of Y. G. Mahendran Hindi film credits
Year	Title	Role	Notes
1986	Naseeb Apna Apna	Ram Prasad	Special appearance
1993	Muqabla	Police Constable Saajan	

=== Television ===
List of Y. G. Mahendran television credits
Year	Title	Role	Channel
	Thuppariyum Sambu	Sambu	Doordarshan
1998	Mr. Brain		DD Podhigai
1999	Vasool Chakravarthy		Sun TV
2001–2002	Vazhkai		Sun TV
2002	Sherlock Maami		DD Podhigai
2002–2004	Rudhraveenai	"Sakthi Upasakar" Narasimma Barathi	Sun TV
2003–2004	Sahaana	JKB	Jaya TV
2004–2005	Chidambara Rahasiyam	Dr. Thillairajan	Sun TV
2007	Thavam		Sun TV
2012–2017	Bhairavi Aavigalukku Priyamanaval	Namboothiri	Sun TV
2015	Enga Veettu Penn		Zee Tamil
2020	Roja	Suresh Chakravarthy	Sun TV
2020–2021	Anbe Vaa	Colonel Ram	Sun TV
2024	Mahakavi Bharathi	Kuvalai Kannan	DD Tamizh
2025	Mega Sangamam - Annam, Kayal & Marumagal	Sakthivel Kalingarayar	Sun TV
2026	Samanthi	Marudanayagam	Zee Tamil

=== Web series ===
List of Y. G. Mahendran web series credits
Year	Title	Role	Platform	Notes
2019	Karoline Kamakshi	Chidhambharam	ZEE5	
2021	Navarasa	Krishna Iyer	Netflix	episode: Summer of '92
2024	Thalaimai Seyalagam	Advocate Rangarajan	ZEE5	
2024	Aindham Vedham	Rudhrapathy	ZEE5	

=== As director ===
Year	Title	Notes
1978	Uravukku Kai Koduppom	
1987	Kathai Kathaiyam Karanamam	

=== Stage plays ===
- Venkata 3
- Vietnam Veedu
- Sudesi Iyer
- Thanthramukhi
- Kaadhalikka Neramundu
- Antha 7 Aatkal
- Ragasiyam Parama Ragasiyam
- Irandam Ragasiyam
- Soppana Vazhvil
- Kasedhan Kadavulada
- Nadagam

=== Dubbing artist ===
List of Y. G. Mahendran film dubbing credits
Year	Title	Actor	Character	Notes
1980	Iru Nilavugal	Kamal Haasan		
1990	Vaaliban	Babu Mohan		
1990	Vyjayanthi IPS	Babu Mohan		
1990	Idhuthanda Police	Babu Mohan		
1992	Pokkiri Ponnu	Babu Mohan		
1992	Aladdin		Genie	
1992	Asokan	Jagathy Sreekumar		
1994	The Lion King		Timon	
1994	Captain	Costumes Krishna		
1999	Devi	Babu Mohan		
2022	Sita Ramam	Murli Sharma		
