= Mahakavi Bharathi =

2024 Indian Tamil historical documentary TV series

- Genre: Historical; documentary; drama
- Screenplay by: Latha Krishna
- Directed by: Latha Krishna
- Creative director: Krishna
- Starring: Naveen Kumar; Isaikavi Ramanan; Deepika; Dharma
- Country of origin: India
- Original language: Tamil
- No. of seasons: 1

Production
- Producer: Mohana
- Cinematography: Kevin Darwin
- Camera setup: Multi-camera
- Production company: Krishnaswamy Associates

Original release
- Network: DD Tamizh
- Release: 21 January 2024 – present

Mahakavi Bharathi is a 2024 Indian Tamil-language historical documentary television series directed by Latha Krishna. The series explores the life of Tamil poet, freedom fighter, and social reformer Subramania Bharati.

The show stars Naveen Kumar, Isaikavi Ramanan, Deepika and Dharma in lead roles. It airs on DD Tamizh from 21 January 2024 on every Sunday at 21:30.

== Premise ==
The series delves into the life of Tamil writer, poet, journalist, Indian independence activist, social reformer and polyglot Subramania Bharati and his wife Chellamma.

== Cast ==
=== Main ===
- Isaikavi Ramanan as Subramania Bharati
  - Naveen Kumar as young C. Subramaniyan
- Dharma as Chellamma
  - Deepika as young Chellamma

=== Recurring ===
- Y. G. Mahendran as Kuvalai Kannan
- Kathadi Ramamurthy as Swaminatha Deekshitar
- Logesh Natrajan as Sri Aurobindo
- Elango Kumanan as V. V. S. Aiyar
- Muthukumaran as V. O. Chidambaram Pillai
- Suppini as Kullachamy
- Krithika Shurajit as Yedugiri
