= Sathrusamhaaram =

- Directed by: J. Sasikumar
- Written by: Kaval Surendran
- Screenplay by: Kaval Surendran
- Starring: Prem Nazir; Jayan; Adoor Bhasi; Manavalan Joseph
- Cinematography: C. Ramachandra Menon
- Edited by: V. P. Krishnan
- Music by: M. K. Arjunan
- Production company: Sree Kalpana Films
- Distributed by: Sree Kalpana Films
- Release date: 1 December 1978
- Country: India
- Language: Malayalam

Sathrusamhaaram is a 1978 Indian Malayalam film directed by J. Sasikumar. The film stars Prem Nazir, Jayan, Adoor Bhasi and Manavalan Joseph in the lead roles. The film has musical score by M. K. Arjunan.

== Cast ==
- Prem Nazir
- Jayan
- Adoor Bhasi
- Manavalan Joseph
- Sankaradi
- Sreelatha Namboothiri
- Praveena
- Unnimary
- Meena

== Soundtrack ==
The music was composed by M. K. Arjunan and the lyrics were written by Pappanamkodu Lakshmanan.

No.	Song	Singers	Lyrics	Length (m:ss)
1	"Aavo Mera"	P. Jayachandran, Sreelatha Namboothiri	Pappanamkodu Lakshmanan	
2	"Kaliyugamoru"	Jolly Abraham	Pappanamkodu Lakshmanan	
3	"Sakhi Onnu Chirichal"	K. J. Yesudas	Pappanamkodu Lakshmanan	
4	"Swarna Naagangal"	K. J. Yesudas	Pappanamkodu Lakshmanan	
