= Chinnanchiru Ulagam =

1966 film by K. S. Gopalakrishnan

- Theatrical release poster
- Directed by: K. S. Gopalakrishnan
- Screenplay by: K. S. Gopalakrishnan
- Based on: Manithanai Kaanom by Subbu Arumugam
- Produced by: K. S. Gopalakrishnan
- Starring: Gemini Ganesan; K. R. Vijaya; Nagesh
- Cinematography: R. Sampath
- Edited by: R. Devarajan
- Music by: K. V. Mahadevan
- Production company: Chitra Productions
- Distributed by: Shanti Pictures
- Release date: 2 September 1966
- Country: India
- Language: Tamil

Chinnanchiru Ulagam (transl. Small world) is a 1966 Indian Tamil-language comedy film written, produced and directed by K. S. Gopalakrishnan. The film stars Gemini Ganesan, K. R. Vijaya, Nagesh, Magic Radhika and V. K. Ramasamy. It is based on the Subbu Arumugam novel Manithanai Kaanom (transl. Mankind is missing). Chinnanchiru Ulagam was released on 2 September 1966 and became a commercial success.

== Cast ==
- Gemini Ganesan
- K. R. Vijaya
- Nagesh
- V. K. Ramasamy
- Magic Radhika
- G. Sakunthala
- M. S. Sundari Bai
- Radhabhai
- O. A. K. Thevar

== Production ==
Chinnanchiru Ulagam is based on Subbu Arumugam's novel Manithanai Kaanom. The film was produced and directed by K. S. Gopalakrishnan under Chitra Productions; Gopalakrishnan also wrote the screenplay. Arumugam wrote the comedy subplot of the film. Cinematography was handled by R. Sampath, and the editing by R. Devarajan. The final length of the film was 4,784 metres (15,696 ft).

== Soundtrack ==
The soundtrack was composed by K. V. Mahadevan, and the lyrics were written by Vaali.

Track listing
No.	Title	Singer(s)	Length
1.	"Manasirukkanum"	P. Susheela, T. M. Soundararajan	3:57
2.	"Pudumai Pengaladi"	P. Susheela	3:47
Total length:			7:44

== Release and reception ==
Chinnanchiru Ulagam was released on 2 September 1966, and distributed by Shanti Pictures. The Indian Express lauded the performances of Ganesan and Nagesh, and Gopalakrishnan's direction, but felt his screenplay was formulaic. The critic also appreciated the music and lyrics. Kalki called the film entertaining timepass, but felt one could expect better from Gopalakrishnan. Despite facing competition from Thanippiravi, Saraswathi Sabatham and Thenmazhai, all released in the same month, the film became a commercial success, and ran well particularly at the Madurai-based Thangam Theatre, which was once considered Asia's largest theatre. Nagesh's dialogues became popular.
