= Manthoppu Kiliye =

- Theatrical release poster
- Directed by: M. A. Kaja
- Screenplay by: M. A. Kaja
- Story by: Ram-Rahim
- Produced by: M. A. Kaja; S. Bhoominathan Bros. Amuthua
- Starring: Sudhakar; Deepa
- Cinematography: T. V. Balu
- Edited by: M. Umanath – Mani
- Music by: Shankar–Ganesh
- Production company: Kadayanallur Cine Arts
- Release date: 20 October 1979
- Running time: 120 minutes
- Country: India
- Language: Tamil

Manthoppu Kiliye (transl. Mango grove's parrot) is 1979 Indian Tamil-language film, directed by M. A. Kaja. It stars Sudhakar and Deepa, with Major Sundarrajan, Gandhimathi and Suruli Rajan in supporting roles. The film was released on 20 October 1979. Suruli Rajan played a niggard in the film which got very popular among the people. The film did well at the box office for his comedy.

== Plot ==
Raghupathy is an honest manager of a cement company, Arun is a worker of this company Mohan, the dishonest owner of another cement company tries to persuade Raghupathy to buy his products and promises commission of ₹1 for each cement bag but he fails due to Raghupathy's honest nature. Late Mohan persuades Arun who accepts this plan due to his greed for money but the plan fails when Raghupathy discovers it, to take revenge he befriends Madan, who wants to marry Arun's sister Saratha who refuses this proposal due to bad nature of Madan and is wed to Shiva, brother of Raghupathy this event is opposed by Arun, however he is unsuccessful in cancelling Saratha's marriage, later Arun succeeds in dismissing Raghupathy from his job by falsely accusing him of stealing the company's money. The three families live separately.

Arun and Jayanthi's family is destroyed by Arun's greed, as he offers his wife to Madan for sex due to his greed for money, but his wife refuses to satisfy sexual favours of Madan. The second family prospers due to wise use of money. Due to which Raghupathy and Saratha are hired. Sulochana and Kasi's family is destroyed due to the misery nature of Kasi Nathan, predominantly due to the death of Kasi Nathan's son.

== Cast ==
- Sudhakar as Siva
- Deepa as Saratha
- Suruli Rajan as ''Kanjan'' Kasinathan
- Major Sundarrajan as Raghupathy
- Gandhimathi as Sulochana
- Omakuchi Narasimhan as Homeopathy doctor
- Shanthi Williams as Lakshmi
- Praveena Bhagyaraj as Jayanthi
- T. K. S. Natarajan as Iyer
- S. N. Parvathy

== Soundtrack ==
Lyrics were written By M. A. Kaja and Poonkuyilan. The music was composed by Shankar–Ganesh.

| Title | Singer(s) | Length |
|---|---|---|
| "Machana Paaru" | Malaysia Vasudevan, Vani Jairam | 4:01 |
| "Poovum Malarnthirukku" | Malaysia Vasudevan, Vani Jairam | 4:12 |
| "Vellikilamai Vidikaalai" | Vani Jairam | 4:53 |
| "Pullimaan Pola" | Vani Jairam | 4:17 |

== Reception ==
Nagai Dharuman of Anna wrote Kaja's desire to give a different kind of film can be seen here and there, the courage to criticize the corrupt society is commendable but the story begins and ends when you think, there is no completeness in anything.
