= Rishte Naate =

1965 film by K. S. Gopalakrishnan

- Poster
- Directed by: K. S. Gopalakrishnan
- Written by: K. S. Gopalakrishnan
- Based on: Karpagam (1963)
- Produced by: K. S. Sabarinathan
- Starring: Raaj Kumar; Nutan; Jamuna
- Edited by: R. Devarajan
- Music by: Madan Mohan
- Release date: 1965
- Running time: 2:38:15
- Country: India
- Language: Hindi

Rishte Naate (transl. Relationships) is a 1965 Indian Hindi-language drama film directed by K. S. Gopalakrishnan. The film stars Raaj Kumar, Jamuna, Nutan and Nazir Hussain. It is a remake of Gopalakrishnan's own Tamil film Karpagam (1963).

== Plot ==
Thakur Narendrapal Singh (Nazir Hussain) is a generous and kind-hearted landlord and zamindar. He has a daughter Kalpana (Jamuna) and a son Raja (Deven Verma). Distrusting his son and his new wife, Roopa (Ameeta), he asks a village laborer, Sunder (Raaj Kumar) who is honest, loyal and hardworking, to marry his daughter. In this manner, Sunder and Kalpana marry, and soon Roopa gives birth to a daughter Meenakshi (Baby Shakila). Roopa was not taking good care of her own daughter so Sunder and Kalpana raise Meenakshi as their own daughter and give her a lot of love. Meenakshi was so attached to Sunder and Kalpana that she thinks they are her real parents and refuses to call her own parents Mother and Father. Tragically, Kalpana is killed by a wild ox saving the child Meenakshi. The Thakur, Sunder, and the child are devastated. The Thakur asks Sunder to marry Savitri (Nutan), who is the daughter of his childhood friend, the local Collector (David). He hopes that in this manner the child will get the love of a mother. Sunder reluctantly agrees, so that child gets the love of a mother and soon Savitri and he marry. Savitri is unable to win the love of the child, nor does she get any affection from Sunder, as he is unable to get Kalpana out of his mind and thoughts. In the meantime, Roopa's father Tandav prasad (Kanaiyalal) is plotting the death of Sunder, so that his daughter can take over the wealth of the Thakur after his death. In a fight clash, Savitri gets seriously injured and lands in hospital hanging between life and death. But Meenakshi saves her by calling her mother for the first time and finally Sunder accepts her. Tandav is arrested by the police for his misdeeds.

== Cast ==
- Raaj Kumar as Sundar
- Nutan as Savitri
- Jamuna as Kalpana
- Deven Verma –asRaja
- Ameeta as Roopa
- Nazir Hussain as Thakur Narendrapal Singh
- David as Collector Ramnarayan
- Kanhaiyalal as Tandav Prasad
- Dhumal as Diwanji
- Baby Shakila as Meenakshi
- Chandrima Bhaduri as Mausi
- V. D. Puranik as Thakur's Friend

== Soundtrack ==
The soundtrack was composed by Madan Mohan. The song "Ari Neendiya Ki Pari" is based on the song "Athaimadi Methayadi" from the movie Karpagam.

#	Title	Lyricist	Singer(s)	Duration
1	"Mujhe Yaad Karne Wale"	Hasrat Jaipuri	Lata Mangeshkar	07:42
2	"Khanak Gayo Hai Bairi Kangna"	Hasrat Jaipuri	Lata Mangeshkar	04:07
3	"Sakhi Ri Tujhe Man Ke Meet Mile"	Hasrat Jaipuri	Lata Mangeshkar	04:47
4	" Ari Neendiya Ki Pari"	Hasrat Jaipuri	Lata Mangeshkar	04:19
