= Y. G. Parthasarathy =

Indian playwright and actor (1917–1990)

- Born: 30 September 1917
- Died: 1990
- Occupations: Playwright, actor
- Spouse: Mrs YGP
- Children: 2, including Y. G. Mahendran
- Relatives: Vyjayanthimala (niece)

Y. G. Parthasarathy (30 September 1917 – 1990) was an Indian playwright and actor who founded the drama troupe United Amateur Artistes (UAA) along with his friend Padmanabhan "Pattu" in 1952.

== Theatre career ==
After returning from Delhi, Parthasarathy was acting with the Suguna Vilasa Sabha in 1948. There he met fellow actor and scriptwriter N. Padmanabhan, known as "Pattu". The two shared an interest in comedy and, after becoming dissatisfied with the opportunities available to them, established United Amateur Artistes in 1952. The troupe's first production was It Happened at Midnight.

UAA became known for plays that used colloquial Tamil, sometimes mixed with English, in contrast with the more formal language then common on the Tamil stage. The troupe also encouraged women to perform and developed a particular association with social comedies. Among its early productions were Yaman Emaandan, Never Say Die and Pavam Balaraman. A retrospective in The Hindu credited Parthasarathy's amateur troupe with helping usher in an era of social plays set in environments familiar to audiences.

UAA also became an early platform for performers and writers who later established careers in theatre and cinema. People associated with the troupe included Jayalalithaa, Nagesh, Lakshmi, Cho Ramaswamy, A. R. Srinivasan, Moulee, Visu and Vietnam Veedu Sundaram.

Alongside his theatre activities, Parthasarathy worked in the Indian government's import and export administration and rose to the position of Deputy Chief Controller of Imports and Exports.

== Personal life ==
Parthasarathy married Rajalakshmi Parthasarathy in 1948. They had two sons, actor and theatre personality Y. G. Mahendran and Y. G. Rajendra. Rajalakshmi later said that her husband encouraged her to establish a school rather than devote herself exclusively to domestic life. The institution developed into the Padma Seshadri Bala Bhavan group of schools.

Parthasarathy's centenary was commemorated in Chennai in September 2017 with a nine-day theatre festival that concluded on 30 September, his birthday.

== Filmography ==
Year	Film	Role
1975	Sila Nerangalil Sila Manithargal	Venkatarama Iyer
1976	Manmatha Leelai	Rekha's father
1977	Thani Kudithanam	Naana's father-in-law
1978	Shankar Salim Simon	
1978	Oru Nadigai Natakam Parkiral	Annasamy
1978	Ilamai Oonjal Aadukirathu	Padma's Father
1979	Adukku Malli	
1981	Tik Tik Tik	Uncredited role
1983	Paayum Puli	
1986	Iravu Pookkal	Judge
