= Bhama Rukmani =

- Theatrical release poster
- Directed by: R. Bhaskaran
- Written by: K. Bhagyaraj
- Produced by: Pavithiram K. Sundaraj
- Starring: K. Bhagyaraj; Radikaa; Praveena
- Cinematography: A. Kannan Narayanan
- Edited by: R. Bhaskaran
- Music by: M. S. Viswanathan
- Production company: Sri Kamakshi Amman Movies
- Release date: 12 June 1980
- Running time: 122 minutes
- Country: India
- Language: Tamil

Bhama Rukmani (/bɑːmɑː/) is a 1980 Indian Tamil-language romantic comedy film directed by R. Bhaskaran and written by K. Bhagyaraj. The film stars Bhagyaraj, Radikaa and Praveena. It was released on 12 June 1980.

== Plot ==
Nandagopal "Nandu", has been in love with Rukmani since their school days. However, his family pressures him to marry his cousin Bhama. Bhama's mother, Aandal, wants her daughter to marry Mounaguru, while Bhama's father, Ezhumalai, favours Nandu as his son-in-law. Nandu's mother, Lakshmi, also supports the idea of Nandu marrying Bhama. Feeling trapped, Nandu confides in his advocate friend, Seshadri "Seshu", who advises him to be honest about his feelings. Nandu reveals his love for Rukmani to his mother, but she threatens to commit suicide if he doesn't marry Bhama. Ezhumalai pushes for an immediate marriage between Nandu and Bhama to outmaneuver Aandal's plans.

The marriage takes place at a temple, where Rukmani happens to visit with her grandmother. Seshu successfully diverts them, but feels guilty when Rukmani affectionately refers to him as a brother. After the marriage, Nandu's mother leaves for a religious trip. Fearing Rukmani might commit suicide if she learns the truth, Nandu marries Rukmani as well, inspired by the film poster of Sri Krishna Leela, which depicts Lord Krishna's marriages to Rukmini and Satyabhama. After Nandu's second marriage to Rukmani, his uncle Ezhumalai discovers his deception and throws him out of the house. Rukmani learns about Nandu's first marriage to Bhama and chases him out of her home. Desperate for a solution, Nandu turns to Seshu, who devises various plans to unite Bhama and Rukmani. Seshu's initial plans, including using food and fake illnesses, fail miserably. Next, Seshu tries to spark possessiveness in both women by making them witness Nandu dancing with a cabaret dancer. However, Bhama and Rukmani team up to beat the dancer, Seshu, and Nandu.

Undeterred, Seshu concocts another plan, telling both women that Nandu will stay with the one who gets pregnant first. Bhama's father, Ezhumalai, pleads with Nandu to return home, but Nandu sneaks out at night to be with Rukmani. When Rukmani learns about Nandu's visit to Bhama, she chases Nandu away. As a final attempt, Seshu advises Nandu to pretend to be dead, hoping that both women will come together out of love for him. As Nandu pretends to be dead, the shared grief brings Bhama and Rukmani's families together, and they begin to bond over their sorrow. Seshu seizes this opportunity to bring Bhama and Rukmani closer, and in a moment of emotional vulnerability, they confess that they would stay united if Nandu were alive. Just as they say this, Nandu suddenly wakes up, shocking everyone. However, instead of uniting them, his ruse only angers Bhama and Rukmani further, and they separate once again.

Defeated, Nandu and Seshu witness a person trying to straighten a dog's tail, reminding them of the Tamil proverb "Naai valai nimirtha mudiyathu," (transl. A dog's tail cannot be straightened) which implies that some things, like Bhama and Rukmani's acceptance of each other, are impossible to change.

== Cast ==
- K. Bhagyaraj as Nandagopal "Nandu"
- Radikaa as Bhama
- Praveena as Rukmani
- Nagesh as Advocate Seshadhri "Seshu"
- Kallapetti Singaram as Solai
- Lakshmi Narayanan
- Usilai Mani
- Chandran Babu
- K. A. Thangavelu as Ezhumalai
- Pandari Bai as Lakshmi
- Gandhimathi as Aandal
- Sundari Bai as Rukmani's grandmother
- Y. G. Mahendran as Mounaguru (guest appearance)
- Jayamala as the cabaret dancer (guest appearance)
- Narayanan as Arulvaaku Aadhimoolam
- Loose Mohan as a teacher
- T. K. S. Natarajan

== Soundtrack ==
The music was composed by M. S. Viswanathan.

Song	Lyrics	Singers
"Nee Oru Kodi Malar"	Chidambaranathan	S. P. Balasubrahmanyam, S Janaki
"Gokula Kannan"	Muthulingam	Vani Jairam
"Kadhava Thiradi Bhama"	Muthulingam	Malaysia Vasudevan
"Take Somebody"	Chidambaranathan	L. R. Eswari, Joseph Krishna

== Critical reception ==
Kanthan of Kalki wrote that the film perfectly captures the drought of stories adapted for the screen. Anna praised the acting, music, cinematography and direction.
