= Charukesi (play) =

Tamil-language play

- Original language: Tamil
- Written by: Venkat
- Genre: Drama

Premiere
- Date: November 2021
- Directed by: Y. G. Mahendran

Charukesi (transl. With beautiful hair) is a Tamil-language play written by Venkat and directed by Y. G. Mahendran, first staged in November 2021. The play, starring Mahendran, was later adapted into a film with Mahendran reprising his role.

== Plot ==
The story revolves around the title character, an ageing Carnatic musician with Alzheimer's disease.

== Cast ==
- Y. G. Mahendran as Charukesi

== Behind-the-scenes ==
Mahendran has stated that singer M. S. Subbulakshmi's diagnosis with Alzheimer's disease later in her life, to the point that she could no longer remember herself or recognise Mahendran despite having known him since he was an infant, became the inspiration for the story of Charukesi, which he and playwright Venkat developed. Playwright Crazy Mohan and his brother, actor Maadhu Balaji were also involved in initial story discussions; the brothers were of the idea to make the play a comedy but eventually desisted, not wanting to be insensitive. The title derives from Charukesi, a Carnatic raga. A plot detail suggested by Mahendran's wife Sudha was added starting with the play's 25th run.

== Production history ==
The play was first staged in November 2021 at Narada Gana Sabha in Chennai. It continued to be staged throughout 2022, especially at Krishnadevaraya, Bangalore, and in 2023 it was staged at Singapore.
