= Paayum Puli (1983 film) =

1983 film by S. P. Muthuraman

- Theatrical release poster
- Directed by: S. P. Muthuraman
- Written by: Panchu Arunachalam
- Produced by: M. Kumaran; M. Saravanan; M. Balasubramanian; M. S. Guhan
- Starring: Rajinikanth; Radha
- Cinematography: Babu
- Edited by: R. Vittal
- Music by: Ilaiyaraaja
- Production company: AVM Productions
- Release date: 14 January 1983
- Running time: 130 minutes
- Country: India
- Language: Tamil
- Box office: ₹20 million

Paayum Puli (transl. Pouncing Tiger/Tiger will pounce) is a 1983 Indian Tamil-language martial arts film directed by S. P. Muthuraman, written by Panchu Arunachalam and produced by AVM Productions. The film, inspired from the 1978 film The 36th Chamber of Shaolin, stars Rajinikanth and Radha, alongside Jaishankar, Silk Smitha and R. N. Sudarshan, with K. Balaji making a cameo appearance. The music was composed by Ilaiyaraaja, while cinematography and editing were handled by Babu and R. Vittal respectively. Paayum Puli was released on 14 January 1983, coinciding with Pongal, and became a commercial success.

== Plot ==
Bharani, a meek person, joins a martial arts school and trains to become a martial artist, to exact revenge against Balram, a smuggler responsible for the death of his sister Sumathi.

== Cast ==
- Rajinikanth as Bharani alias "Paayum Puli"
- Radha as Revathy
- Jaishankar as Ranjith
- R. N. Sudarshan as Balram
- V. K. Ramasamy as Ceylon Sundari's uncle
- Manorama as Ceylon Sundari
- Thiagarajan as Thiyagu
- Y. G. Parthasarathy as Gopalakrishnan
- Sathyaraj as a gangster in Radha's tea stall
- Silk Smitha as Roopa
- Janagaraj as Chinnasamy
- Y. G. Mahendran as Mahi
- LIC Narasimhan as a hotel manager

Cameo appearances

- K. Balaji as master of martial arts
- Azhagu as a fighter

== Production ==
Director S. P. Muthuraman and writer Panchu Arunachalam, cashing on the popularity of Bruce Lee and his martial arts films, designed the story of Paayum Puli with Judo Rathnam being hired as the action choreographer. and it was inspired by the 1978 film The 36th Chamber of Shaolin. AVM Productions initially wanted A. C. Thirulokachandar to play the antagonist, but he declined the offer. Karate Mani, a stuntman was later cast in the role, but he walked out and the role finally went to Jaishankar. Filming took place primarily in a village near Andhra Pradesh.

== Soundtrack ==
The music was composed by Ilaiyaraaja and lyrics were written by Vaali. For the dubbed Telugu version Debbaku Debba, the lyrics were written by Rajasri. The disco song "Aadi Maasam" was well received, and it was later remixed by Srikanth Deva in Thottupaar.

Tamil track listing
No.	Title	Singer(s)	Length
1.	"Appakada Annakili"	Malaysia Vasudevan, P. Susheela	3:20
2.	"Aadi Maasa Kaathadikka"	S. P. Balasubrahmanyam, S. Janaki	5:34
3.	"Pothukkittu Oothuthadi"	Malaysia Vasudevan, P. Susheela	4:25
4.	"Vaa Vaa Maama"	S. Janaki	4:32
Total length:			17:51

Telugu track listing
No.	Title	Singer(s)	Length
1.	"Joru Vana Kurishindhi"	S. P. Balasubrahmanyam, S. P. Sailaja
2.	"Ra Ra Mama"	S. P. Sailaja
3.	"Aata Paata"	S. P. Balasubrahmanyam, S. P. Sailaja
4.	"Ammayi Andalani"	S. P. Balasubrahmanyam, S. P. Sailaja

== Release and reception ==
Paayum Puli was released on 14 January 1983, coinciding with Pongal. Thiraignani of Kalki said the real pouncing tigers of the film were the hero and the technicians. Balumani of Anna praised Ilaiyaraaja's music, Babu's cinematography and Judo Ratnam's stunt choreography but panned the story and dialogues and called it the weakest film from AVM Productions. Paayum Puli was a commercial success, completed a 133-day run at theatres and grossed over ₹20 million (equivalent to ₹340 million or US$4.0 million in 2023).

The makers wanted to release the film in Sri Lanka, but got into trouble as the title had "Puli" (Tiger), perceived as alluding to the Liberation Tigers of Tamil Eelam. It was decided to release the film in the country with the title Irumbu Karangal (transl. Iron hands), but the film still did not release there.

== Bibliography ==
- Ramachandran, Naman (2014) [2012]. Rajinikanth: The Definitive Biography. New Delhi: Penguin Books. ISBN 978-0-14-342111-5.
- Saravanan, M. (2013) [2005]. AVM 60 Cinema (in Tamil) (3rd ed.). Rajarajan Pathippagam. OCLC 1158347612.
