= Ezham Arivu (TV series) =

Indian television reality show

- Promotional poster
- Also known as: Tamilagathin Sirantha Illam Vigyanikana Thedal
- Genre: Talent; Science reality show
- Created by: Agnishwar Jayaprakash
- Directed by: Anand Rathinam; Nandhini Sundhar
- Presented by: Antony Raj
- Judges: Sultan Ahmed Ismail; T.S. Natrajan
- Country of origin: India
- Original language: Tamil
- No. of seasons: 02
- No. of episodes: 172

Production
- Producer: J. Agnishwar
- Production location: Tamil Nadu
- Camera setup: Multi-camera
- Running time: approx. 22-24 minutes per episode

Original release
- Network: DD Podhigai
- Release: 18 August 2016 – 11 August 2017

Ezham Arivu is a 2016–2017 Indian science reality show which aired on DD Podhigai from 18 August 2016 to 11 August 2017 on Mondays to Fridays for 172 episodes. The show was advertised as "a search for Tamilagathin Sirantha Illam Vigyanikana Thedal (Tamil Nadu's Young Scientist)." Agnishwar Jayaprakash designed and created the show to pay tribute to the late Dr. APJ Abdul Kalam, former president of India, whose dream was to enlighten students' mind through innovation. Ezham Arivu was hosted by Antony Raj.

== Description ==
Ezham Arivu was a 2016–2017 Indian science reality show which aired on DD Podhigai from 18 August 2016 to 11 August 2017. It aired on Mondays to Fridays at 7:30 p.m. (IST) for 172 episodes. The show was hosted by Antony Raj. The motto of Ezham Arivu was "a search for Tamilagathin Sirantha Illam Vigyanikana Thedal (Tamil Nadu's Young Scientist)."

The show was a tailor-made to showcase the different and diverse scientific innovations of the students at the same time the program is value added with inspiring background stories and preparatory clips of students creating the inventions. This show was aimed at bringing out young scientists who thinks out of the box, by serving as an ideal platform to exhibit their talent. Agnishwar Jayaprakash designed the show as a tribute to the late Dr. APJ Abdul Kalam, former president of India, whose dream was to enlighten students' mind through innovation.

=== Format of the show ===
- The top 30 contestants of the program were previewed and shortlisted by Dr APJ Abdul Kalam. This was his last interaction with school children before his death.
- Unique-theme-based rounds (e.g., inventions based on agriculture, consumer products, waste management, energy).
- Rapid fire rounds (Agni Paritchai) – the contestant had 60 seconds to answer questions posed by the judges.
- Daily, 6 contestants will participate. Least scorers were eliminated based on their science projects and rapid fire score marks evaluated by judges.
- After daily eliminations, top 6 finalists were selected.
- Among the top 6 finalists, the best were chosen as a show winner, awarded the title of Tamilagathin Sirantha Illam Vigyani (Tamil Nadu's Young Scientist).
