= Vishwaroopam (1978 film) =

- Directed by: Narayanan P. V. & Vasudevan T. K.
- Written by: Vasu Gopal
- Produced by: Chithrakala Kendram
- Starring: M. G. Soman; Jayan; Vincent; Vidhubala; K. P. Ummer; Rajasree; Sankaradi
- Cinematography: Madhu Ambat
- Music by: M. S. Viswanathan; Mankompu Gopalakrishnan (Lyrics)
- Release date: 8 July 1978
- Country: India
- Language: Malayalam

Vishwaroopam is a 1978 Indian Malayalam-language film directed by Narayanan P. V. & Vasudevan T. K. The film stars M. G. Soman, Jayan, Vincent, Vidhubala, K. P. Ummer and Sankaradi.

== Cast ==
- M. G. Soman
- Jayan
- Vincent
- Vidhubala
- K. P. Ummer
- Sankaradi
- Prema
- Praveena
- Rajasree
- Mydhili

== Soundtrack ==
The music was composed by M. S. Viswanathan and the lyrics were written by Mankombu Gopalakrishnan.

No.	Song	Singers	Lyrics	Length (m:ss)
1	"Ezhu Swarnathaazhika Choodum"	P. Susheela	Mankombu Gopalakrishnan	
2	"Kuchela Moksham"	M. S. Viswanathan	Mankombu Gopalakrishnan	
3	"Naaga Panchami"	P. Jayachandran	Mankombu Gopalakrishnan	
4	"Pushpangal"	P. Susheela	Mankombu Gopalakrishnan	
5	"Thambraan Kothichathu"	Ambili	Mankombu Gopalakrishnan	
