= Padikkadha Pannaiyar =

- Poster
- Directed by: K. S. Gopalakrishnan
- Written by: K. S. Gopalakrishnan
- Produced by: G. Sulochana
- Starring: Sivaji Ganesan; K. R. Vijaya
- Cinematography: Dutt
- Edited by: R. Devarajan
- Music by: Ilaiyaraaja
- Production company: Karpaga Lakshmi Pictures
- Release date: 23 March 1985
- Country: India
- Language: Tamil

Padikkadha Pannaiyar (transl. Uneducated Landlord) is a 1985 Indian Tamil-language drama film, directed by K. S. Gopalakrishnan and produced by G. Sulochana. The film stars Sivaji Ganesan, K. R. Vijaya, Y. G. Mahendra and V. K. Ramasamy. It is a remake of the director's 1967 film Kan Kanda Deivam, and was Vijaya's 200th film as an actress.

== Cast ==
- Sivaji Ganesan
- K. R. Vijaya
- Anuradha
- Y. G. Mahendran
- V. K. Ramasamy
- Dilip
- Thengai Srinivasan
- Jayamala
- Culcutta Viswanathan
- V. S. Raghavan
- Achamillai Gopi
- Venu Aravind
- V. Gopalakrishnan
- Shanmugasundaram
- Pasi Sathya
- Bayilvan Ranganathan
- Ennatha Kannaiya

== Production ==
The film was launched on 2 July 1984.

== Soundtrack ==
The soundtrack was composed by Ilaiyaraaja.

Song title	Singers	Lyricist
"Savari Kaaru Savari"	Malaysia Vasudevan, Deepan Chakravarthy	Vaali
"Konatha Sengarumbu"	Deepan Chakravarthy, S. P. Sailaja	Gangai Amaran
"Sangeetham Kettukunga"	Vani Jairam, Chorus	Gangai Amaran
"Onnum Theriyatha"	Malaysia Vasudevan, S. P. Sailaja	K. S. Gopalakrishnan

== Reception ==
Jayamanmadhan of Kalki wrote the title of the film itself suggests that the story is about twenty years back.
