= Manmadha Leelai (1976 film) =

1976 film by K. Balachander

- Theatrical release poster
- Directed by: K. Balachander
- Written by: K. Balachander
- Produced by: P. R. Govindarajan; J. Duraiswamy
- Starring: Kamal Haasan; Aalam
- Cinematography: B. S. Lokanath
- Edited by: N. R. Kittu
- Music by: M. S. Viswanathan
- Production company: Kalakendra Movies
- Release date: 27 February 1976
- Running time: 161 minutes
- Country: India
- Language: Tamil

Manmadha Leelai (transl. Cupid's Tale) is a 1976 Indian Tamil-language romantic sex comedy film written and directed by K. Balachander. The film stars Kamal Haasan and Aalam. A number of actresses debuted in the Tamil industry through this film, including Hema Chaudhary, Jaya Prada, Y. Vijaya among others. It was released on 27 February 1976. Though the film was criticised for its bold content when it was released, it has received cult status over the passing years and is considered a trendsetter.

== Plot ==
The film explores the life journey of a wannabe womaniser, Madhu and his attempted affairs with various women where he fails invariably, including those who are married.

The main conflict is between Madhu and his wife Rekha. The many women he flirts with and those who flirt with him are doing so for many different reasons. One has a drunkard husband who has no interest in her; another is merely living her fantasy of being in an extramarital relationship through phone; and another is an ultra-modern hippie cultured woman. Madhu, however, does not manage to consummate with any of them. He confesses all his problems to his secretary Iyer, who resigns, unable to bear his torture. In the end, the now-pregnant Rekha finds out about Madhu's attempted philandering and decides to leave him, only to find out that her role-model father has had a lifelong affair with their long-term maidservant, which her mother has chosen to ignore. Seeing that men are no better and considering that her husband is yet to consummate, she decides to go back to her husband, who vows to become a reformed man.

== Cast ==
- Kamal Haasan as Madhu
- Halam as Rekha
- Hema Chaudhary as Madhavi
- Jaya Prada as Kannagi
- Y. Vijaya as Bhargavi (Ms. Wrong Number)
- Reena as Anju
- Y. G. Mahendran as Petition Kodhandam
- Y. G. Parthasarathy as Rekha's father
- Radha Ravi (credited as M. R. R. Ravi)
- T. D. Kusalakumari as Rekha's mother
- Praveena Bhagyaraj (uncredited role)

== Production ==
M. R. Radha's son Radha Ravi made his acting debut with the film. The coat that Kamal Haasan wears prominently in the film was actually his brother Charuhasan's.

== Soundtrack ==
The soundtrack was composed by M. S. Viswanathan, with lyrics by Kannadasan. The song "Naadham Ennum" is set in Shree ranjani raga, while "Hello My Dear" is set in Dharmavati.

Track listing
No.	Title	Singer(s)	Length
1.	"Manaivi Amaivathellam"	K. J. Yesudas	4:29
2.	"Naathamenum"	Vani Jairam	4:12
3.	"Hello My Dear Wrong Number"	K. J. Yesudas, L. R. Eswari	4:22
4.	"Manmadha"	S. P. Balasubrahmanyam	5:02
5.	"Netru Oru Menagai"	A. V. Ramanan	4:38
6.	"Sugam Thanaa"	S. P. Balasubrahmanyam, P. Susheela	3:56
Total length:			26:39

== Release and reception ==
The film struggled to get a censor certificate. Kanthan of Kalki called it a problematic story but gets specialised by skill in creating characters and added that there is nothing special about it as a screenplay but Balachander has added innovation to the film by sticking the scenes quickly. Naagai Dharuman of Navamani praised the acting, dialogues and direction.

== Other versions ==
After Vijaya Bapineedu acquired the rights to dub the film in Telugu, he edited it down by more than 250 feet (76 m). Though Balachander was disappointed with the dubbed version, titled Manmadha Leela, it fared better than the Tamil original. The film was dubbed in Hindi as Meethi Meethi Baatein (1977), which fared reasonably well. In the late 2000s, K. Balachander reached out to Siddharth about remaking the film. The actor's refusal meant that the project was dropped.

== Legacy ==
Even though the film stirred up controversies when it was released, it later became a cult classic, and is considered a trendsetter. Kamal Haasan said, "it was an interesting subject. For that period it was unusual, a breaking down of the fidelity stereotypes".
