= K. S. Gopalakrishnan =

Indian screenwriter and director

K.S. Gopalakrishnan
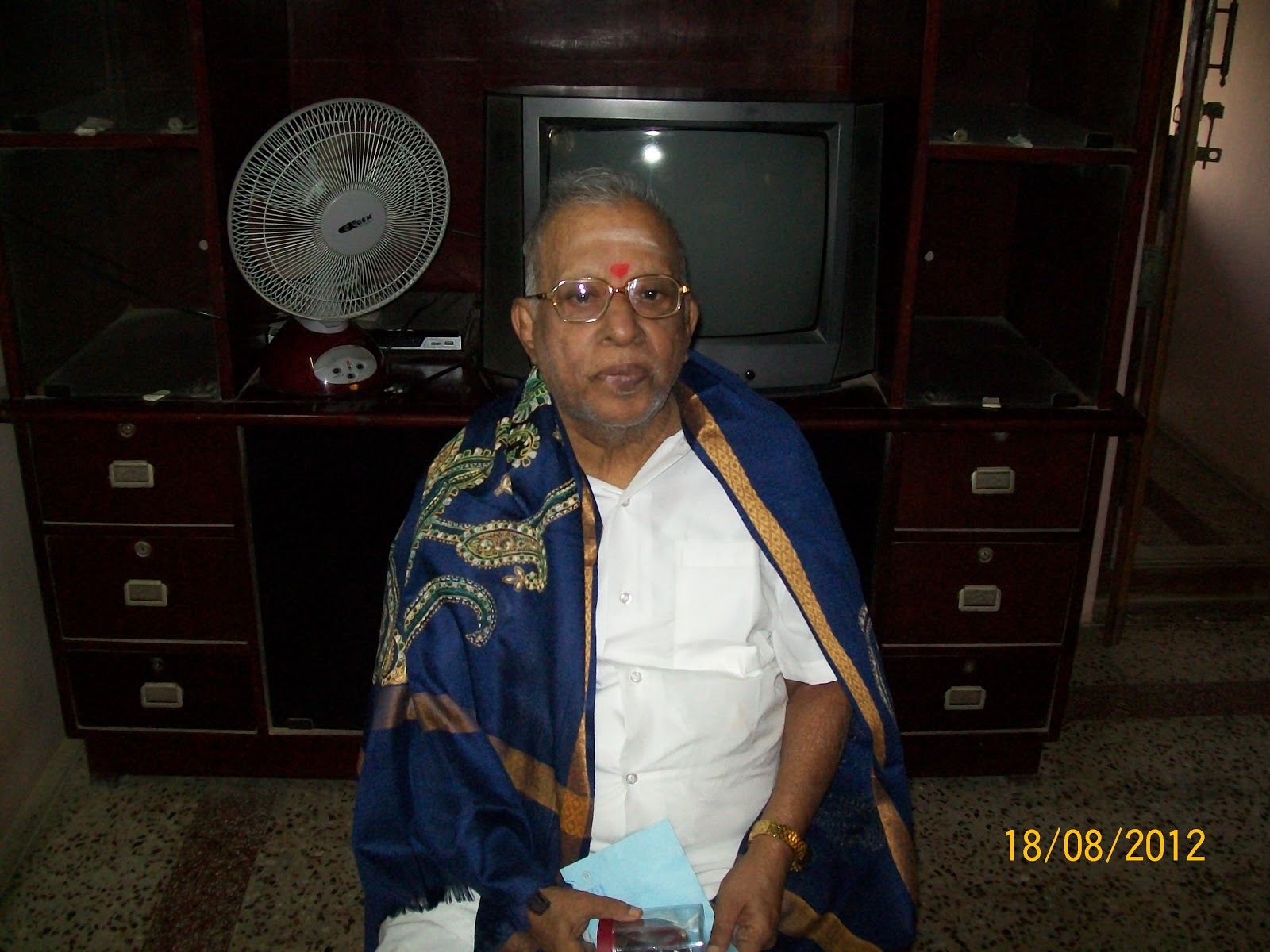
- Born: 1929; Sakkottai, Tanjore District, Madras Presidency
- Died: 14 November 2015 (aged 85–86); Chennai, Tamil Nadu, India
- Occupations: Film Writer, Director, Producer, Lyricist, Studio Owner, Devotional Orator on Thiruppugazh
- Years active: 1954-92
- Children: K. S. G. Venkatesh

K. S. Gopalakrishnan was an Indian screenwriter, director, producer, and lyricist, who worked in Tamil, Malayalam and Hindi films. Since the early 1960s, he directed 70 films. He spent most of his career directing and producing movies with social and devotional themes. Most of his movies are melodramas. His son K. S. G. Venkatesh is an actor who has acted in television serials and in films like Sathuranga Vettai.

== Career ==
After serving the Nawab's troupe for about nineteen years in various capacities, Gopalakrishnan joined Sri Devi Nataka Sabha where he wrote two successful plays entitled Post-Man, Thambi (younger brother), and Ezhuthalan (writer).

== Name fellow ==
K. S. Gopalakrishnan shared exactly the same name with an earlier director and actor who worked in Tamil cinema in the 1940s and 1950s. This Gopalakrishnan, who directed films produced by S. S. Vasan, did not achieve much cinematic success, and was often confused with the later Gopalakrishnan.

== Death ==
K. S. Gopalakrishnan died on 14 November 2015 at the age of 86.

== Filmography ==
=== As director ===
Year	Film	Cast	Notes
1962	Sarada	S. S. Rajendran, C. R. Vijayakumari	Debut movie
1962	Deivathin Deivam	S. S. Rajendran, C. R. Vijayakumari	
1963	Karpagam	Gemini Ganesan, K.R.Vijaya, Savithri	also writer
1964	Kai Koduttha Dheivam	Sivaji Ganesan, S. S. Rajendran, Savithri, K. R. Vijaya	also screenplay
1964	Aayiram Roobai	Gemini Ganesan, Savitri, M. R. Radha	
1965	Ennathaan Mudivu	A. V. M. Rajan, Anjali Devi, T. S. Balaiah	
1966	Chitthi	Gemini Ganesan, Padmini, M. R. Radha	
1966	Chinnanchiru Ulagam	Gemini Ganesan, K. R. Vijaya	
1966	Selvam	Sivaji Ganesan, K. R. Vijaya	
1967	Pesum Deivam	Sivaji Ganesan, Padmini	
1967	Kan Kanda Deivam	Padmini, S. V. Ranga Rao	
1968	Panama Pasama	Gemini Ganesan, B. Saroja Devi	
1968	Uyira Maanama	Jaishankar, Vijaya Nirmala, R. Muthuraman	
1969	Kula Vilakku	Gemini Ganesan, B. Saroja Devi	
1970	Thabalkaran Thangai	Gemini Ganesan, Vanisri, R. Muthuraman	
1970	Malathi	Gemini Ganesan, B. Saroja Devi, Ravichandran	
1971	Kulama Gunama	Sivaji Ganesan, Jaishankar, Padmini	
1971	Aathi Parasakthi	Gemini Ganesan, Jayalalithaa, Padmini	
1972	Kurathi Magan	Gemini Ganesan, K. R. Vijaya	
1972	Vaazhaiyadi Vaazhai	R. Muthuraman, S. V. Ranga Rao, Prameela	
1973	Vandhaale Magaraasi	Jaishankar, Jayalalithaa	
1973	Nathaiyil Muthu	R. Muthuraman, K. R. Vijaya	
1974	Swathi Nakshatram	P. Bhanumathi, Udhaya Chandrika, Ravikumar	
1975	Njan Ninne Premikkunnu	Kamal Haasan, Girija	Malayalam
1976	Dasavatharam	Ravikumar, Jayachitra	
1976	Vayilla Poochi	Jaishankar, Sripriya	
1977	Palabishegham	Jaishankar, Sripriya, Srikanth	
1977	Punniyam Seidhaval	R. Muthuraman, Jayalakshmi	
1977	Rowdy Rakkamma	Jaishankar, Srividya, Kavitha	25th Film
1978	Ullathil Kuzhanthaiyadi	Jaishankar, Sripriya	
1978	Naalumanippookkal	Madhu, Sreedevi	Malayalam
1978	Kanchi Kamakshi	Major Sundarrajan, Gemini Ganesan, Sujatha	
1979	Adukku Malli	Vijayakumar, Sujatha	
1980	Nandri Karangal	Srividya, Vanitha Krishnachandran,	
1980	Neer Nilam Neruppu	Sujatha, Vijay Anandh	
1982	Deviyin Thiruvilayadal	Sridevi, Ambika, K. R. Vijaya	
1981	Magarandham	Radhika Sarathkumar, Mohanram	
1982	Nayakkar Magal	Vijayakumar, Jayachitra, Sujatha	
1983	Yuga Dharmam	K. R. Vijaya, Rajesh	
1985	Padikkadha Pannaiyar	Sivaji Ganesan, K. R. Vijaya	
1986	Mahashakti Mariamman	K. R. Vijaya, Rajesh	
1986	Sakhavu	Unnimary, Bheeman Raghu	Malayalam
1988	Paarthal Pasu	Ramarajan, Pallavi	
1988	Charavalayam	Lalu Alex, Priya	Malayalam
1989	Athaimadi Methaiadi	K. S. G. Venkatesh, Pallavi	
1990	Enakku Oru Neethi	Pallavi, Chitra	
1992	Kaviya Thalaivan	Vijayakanth, Bhanupriya	Last movie

=== As lyricist ===
- Edhir Paradhathu (1954) - "Thinnu paarthu"
- Amaradeepam (1956) - "Naanayam Manushanukku"
- Vazhvile Oru Naal (1956) - "Mannilum Vinnilum.... Ezhai Vaazhvil Engum Thunbam"
- Engal Veettu Mahalakshmi (1957) - "Polladha Payalai", "Mannai Nambi Maram", "Purushan Sollai", "Kaathadi"
- Uthama Puthiran (1958) - "Kondattam Manasukkulle", "Un Azhagai Kanniyargal"
- Deivapiravi (1960) - "Kattadhathukku Manai", "Manidhanai Manidhan"
- Yugadharmam (1983)
- Padikkadha Pannaiyar (1985) - "Onnum Theriyatha"

=== As writer ===
- Deivapiravi — 1960
- Naan Kanda Sorgam (Dialogues) — 1960
- Padikkadha Medhai (dialogue) — 1960
- Kairasi (story, screenplay, dialogue) — 1960
- Ellam Unakkaga (screenplay, dialogue) — 1961
- Kumudham (story, screenplay, dialogue) — 1961
- Annai (dialogue/screenplay) — 1962
- Deivathin Deivam (dialogue/Screenplay) - 1962
- Thodu Needa (story credits; remake of Karpagam) - 1965
- Bhavani (story, screenplay, dialogue) — 1967
- Sange Muzhangu - Written by – 1972
- Uravukku Kai Koduppom - 1975
- Vishukkani (story credits; remake of Karpagam) - 1977
- Per Sollum Pillai (dialogue) — 1987

== Awards ==
National Film Awards

- 1962 – Certificate of Merit for the Third Best Feature Film in Tamil - Sarada
- 1963 – Certificate of Merit for the Second Best Feature Film in Tamil – Karpagam
- 1964 – President's silver medal for Best Feature Film – Kai Kodutha Dheivam

Titles and other honours

- Kalaimamani in 1975

Tamil Nadu State Film Awards

- Tamil Nadu State Film Honorary Award - Arignar Anna Award in 1990
