= Encyclopaedia of Indian Cinema =

1994 film encyclopedia compiled by Ashish Rajadhyaksha and Paul Willemen

- Editors: Ashish Rajadhyaksha; Paul Willemen
- Language: English
- Subject: Indian cinema
- Genre: Film encyclopedia
- Published: 1994 (first edition); 1999 (second edition)
- Publisher: British Film Institute; Oxford University Press; (1994 edition): Fitzroy Dearborn Publishers; (1999 edition)
- Media type: Print
- Pages: 568 (1994 edition); 658 (1999 edition)
- ISBN: 978-0-85170-455-5

The Encyclopaedia of Indian Cinema is a 1994 film encyclopedia compiled by Ashish Rajadhyaksha and Paul Willemen; it was substantially revised and expanded in 1999. It provides biographical entries and filmographies of prominent figures in Indian cinema, alongside technical information, synopses, and criticism of significant Indian films spanning from the silent-era to mid-1990s. Academic Lawrence Liang describes the book as "one of the most significant events in the history of film studies in India", noting that it serves as a starting point for many film scholars and researchers.

Rajadhyaksha and Willemen conceived the encyclopedia as a research tool that would provide a foundation for subsequent scholarship. In their introduction, they described it as a "baseline" that other researchers could "amplify and correct", allowing it to develop into a work of "collective, constantly retuned scholarship". Its compilation was complicated by the limited availability of Indian films, particularly those from the silent era; the authors consequently relied on surviving publicity materials and contemporary accounts.

The first edition was published in 1994 by the British Film Institute (BFI) and Oxford University Press, in association with the National Film Archive of India. The book was unveiled on 17 November 1994 at a reception hosted by the Nehru Centre in London, as part of the BFI London Film Festival celebrations. Upon publication, it received favourable reviews: a critic for Times Higher Education Supplement described it as an unprecedented undertaking, stating that "Nothing on this scale has ever been attempted before", while Sumita Chakravarty of Historical Journal of Film, Radio & Television called it a "marvelous gift to the world of film scholarship".

In a review of the 1995 reprint published by Indiana University Press, Vijay S. Jodha of Cinéaste praised the encyclopedia as a work of "meticulous scholarship". He particularly appreciated its explanations of Indian film genres, including Historical, Devotional and All India Film, although he noted the omission of contemporary filmmakers such as Ismail Merchant and Mira Nair. The first edition was also criticised for spelling and chronological errors and for their limited coverage of contemporary Indian cinema.

The authors subsequently expanded the encyclopedia's coverage of the 1990s, and a revised edition was published by Fitzroy Dearborn Publishers in 1999. It received favourable reviews from reference librarians. Ravi Shenoy of Library Journal described it as a "one-stop reference book on Indian cinema" and recommended it for academic and public libraries. Samantha J. Gust of Reference & User Services Quarterly called it a "unique, remarkable, and important work", despite organisational flaws, and highlighted its usefulness for the researchers of Indian cinema.

Writing in Media International Australia, Adrian M. Athique stated that "the sheer scale of the undertaking, and of the work itself, make this [encyclopedia] a major contribution to critical writing on the cinema in India". Likewise, Kari Hanet described the book as "an invaluable and long overdue research tool", adding that it represented "a step towards redressing an inadmissible imbalance which has prevented Indian cinema from occupying its rightful place in the History of the Cinema".
