= DD North-East =

DD North East
- Logo used since 2014
- Country: India
- Broadcast area: India and parts of Asia, China and Gulf Countries.
- Headquarters: Guwahati, Assam, India

Programming
- Languages: Assamese, Bodo, Bengali, Hindi
- Timeshift service: DD National Guwahati

Ownership
- Owner: Prasar Bharati

History
- Launched: 1994; 32 years ago (as Doordarshan Kendra Guwahati)
- Former names: Doordarshan Kendra Guwahati

Links
- Website: Official Website

DD North-East previously known as DD-13 was a state owned TV channel telecasting from Doordarshan Kendra in Guwahati, Agartala, Kohima, Imphal, Jorhat, Silchar, Dibrugarh, Tura, Aizawl, Itanagar and Shillong. On 4 August 2019 a particular 24x7 Doordarshan channel relaunched for Assam state named as DD Assam and it replaced DD North East and the channel was launched by Minister of Information and Broadcasting Shri Prakash Javadekar Ji through virtual event and CEO of Prasar Bharati Mr. Shashi Shekhar Vempati and other top levels of Doordarshan was present on the event. The event was also live telecasted on 11:00 A.M. at DD News DD National DD India DD Bharati and other North East DD channels. The programmes are produced at Doordarshan studios in Guwahati, Agartala, Kohima, Imphal, Silchar, Dibrugarh, Tura, Aizawl, Itanagar, Shillong and Gangtok for DD North East.

== History ==
The programmes are news and current affairs, art and culture. The first Assamese news transmission was introduced by the channel on 15 March 1991. Its name changed to DD Assam on 2 December 2019.

== Programmes ==
- Axomiya Batori
- English News
- Krisi Darsan
- Krirangan
- Yuva Darpan
- Dhun Dhamaka
