= DD Tamil =

Doordarshan Tamil-language television channel

- Country: India
- Broadcast area: India and Global
- Headquarters: Chennai, Tamil Nadu, India

Programming
- Picture format: 1080i HDTV

Ownership
- Owner: Doordarshan
- Sister channels: DD Pondicherry; DD North-East; DD Odia; DD Punjabi; DD Sahyadri; DD Malayalam

History
- Launched: 15 August 1975; 51 years ago
- Former names: Madras Television Centre (1975–1994); DD 5 (1994–2000); DD Podhigai (2000–2024)

Links
- Website: Official Website

Availability

Terrestrial
- Analogue: VHF band
- DVB-T2: Frequency DVB-T2
- DD Free Dish: LCN 21
- Airtel digital TV: LCN 820
- D2M: Availability soon in India

DD Tamil (formerly DD Podhigai) is an Indian Tamil-language state-owned public television broadcaster founded by the Government of India, owned by Doordarshan. It is broadcast both terrestrially and via satellite. It was established on 15 August 1975. DD Tamil launched its HD version on 19 January 2024.

== History ==
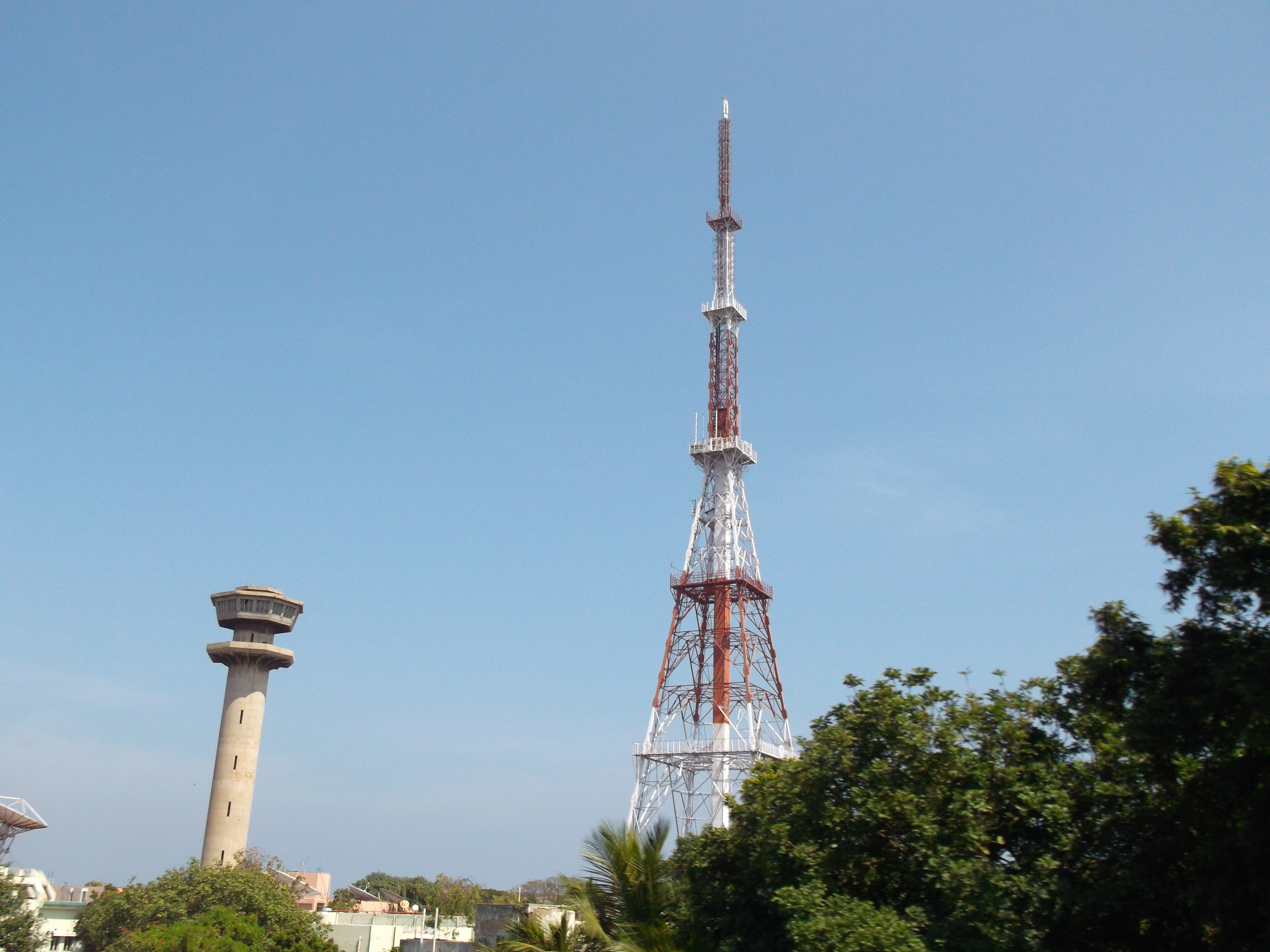
Television tower of Doordarshan Kendra, Chennai. The tower is also called as Podhigai Tower.

Doordarshan Kendra Chennai was inaugurated on 15 August 1975. The service had been extended to the entire state in phased manner by installing Terrestrial Transmitters of different capacities (HPTs, LPTs, VLPTs) at different parts of the state. Only one channel with limited time for regional language, that is, Tamil was telecasted, the duration of the entire telecast was not for 24 hours. During 1985, colour transmission was started; in 1988 a second channel was started. Meanwhile, in 1986 Tamil serials were telecasted for the first time. DD Chennai is one of the oldest kendras in the country, having been begun in the mid-1970s.

In addition to the Terrestrial transmission, Chennai programmes were beamed through satellite and cable networks. The channel is owned and operated by Doordarshan, a television network of Prasar Bharati Broadcasting Corporation and is based in Chennai. Prasar Bharati is an autonomous corporation of the Government of India's Ministry of Information and Broadcasting and comprises Doordarshan television network and All India Radio.

=== The early years ===
Employees trained at FTII in January 1975 ahead of the launch of the service. The channel began broadcast on an experimental basis on 15 August 1975 on channel 4 from a makeshift studio at Chennai Doordarshan Kendra in Chennai as part of All India Radio. It started with 20 TV receivers in and around Chennai and transmitted one-hour educational and developmental programs twice a week. Regular daily transmission started in 1975.

At launch, it became the first television station at all to be installed in South India, as well as the fifth Doordarshan station overall, after Delhi (1959), Mumbai (1972), Srinagar (1973) and Jharkhand (1974).

In 1976, the Indian government constituted Doordarshan, the public television broadcaster, as a separate department under the Ministry of Information and Broadcasting. Doordarshan Kendra Chennai has transformed from the initial setup of television base production center during 1975.

Television Base Production Center was established for SITE (Satellite Instructional Television Experiment) Project conducted from 1975 to 1976. This Experiment was envisaged by Govt. of India to Educate rural population by producing and telecasting area-specific programmes on the subjects ranging from agriculture, animal husbandry, health and nutrition, and adult education through satellite. Based on research villages had been selected to install DR Sets (Direct Reception Sets) viewing telecasts. This experiment was conducted Tamil Nadu and five other states.

These programmes were telecast through "ATS – 6" Satellite borrowed from the United States's National Aeronautics and Space Administration (NASA). On successful completion of SITE Project, these programmes were continued as INSAT project and was telecast through India's own Satellite INSAT. In addition to the terrestrial transmission, Chennai programmes were beamed through satellite and cable networks.

=== Later developments ===
As of 1983, the approval rating for the station was of 82%. Networked programming received a lower approval rate of 60%, with massive disapproval of Hindi-language news bulletins. English-language programming was still well-received.

DD Chennai converted to colour between 1985 and 1986. Around this time the first Tamil serials were produced. The station competed against the Sri Lanka Rupavahini Corporation with locals preferring Rupavahini over Doordarshan. The relays were often jammed by a Doordarshan relayer in Trivandrum in Kerala by Keltron. The service, which was in colour from the outset, led to a surge in colour television sets before DD Kendra Chennai converted. The power of the Doordarshan transmitters was reduced after an order issued by the government in 1984. After the passing of new rules following the airing of a Tamil dub of Hum Log, Doordarshan's first serial, all Hindi serials had to be dubbed in advance before airing on Doordarshan Kendra Chennai. In 1985 alone, Tamil-language programming like Oliyum Oliyum and Thirai Malar topped the first Doordarshan survey in Madras.

=== Satellite, Podhigai and rename to DD Tamil ===
Doordarshan Kendra Chennai's regional satellite network, DD 5, was launched on 15 April 1993. This service is viewed in India and some parts of the world. DD-5 took a new identity in Tamil and was renamed DD Podhigai on 15 January 2000.

It was also a part of the 50th anniversary of the main Delhi station in October 2009, producing a cultural special for this end.

DD Podhigai was rebranded as DD Tamil HD on 19 January 2024.

== DD National, DD Podhigai and Narrow cast ==
DD Chennai has a three-tier programme service:

- National (DD National): The emphasis in the programmes in the National service is on events and issues of interest to the entire nation.
- Regional (DD Tamil): Programmes in the regional service focus on events and issues of interest to the people of that particular state.
- Local (Narrow cast): The local (DD Coimbatore, DD Madurai, DD Pudhucherry) service caters to the needs of the populace living in the areas falling within the reach of a particular transmitter through area specific programmes in the local languages and dialects.

In addition, the programmes in the national and regional services are also available in satellite mode to the viewers all over the country.

DD Chennai is the only regional language terrestrial channel, that has sixteen hours Program from 11 p.m. to 3 p.m. link to Delhi DD National. In the terrestrial mode, that has eight hours Program from 3 p.m. to 11 p.m., has DD Podhigai. DD Chennai reaches 94 percent of the population of Tamil Nadu. The channel originates its programmes in Chennai.

DD Chennai was launched on 15 August 1975 and the network features some original programming, such as dramas, comedy-series, talk shows, documentaries, and some times re-runs of popular TV shows from other Tamil television channels. In addition, the channel also shows dubbed programs from other Indian languages, such as Urdu, Punjabi, Tamil, and so forth.

=== DD Kendra Puducherry ===
An independent station for the union territory of Puducherry started broadcasting on 15 August 1992. The station was only available on terrestrial television and was rejected by cable operators. In its later years, it broadcast for eight hours a day. In August 2021, it was decided that Doordarshan would shut down the kendra, including its PGFs at Madurai and Coimbatore.

== Program sourcing ==
Programmes for different channels of DD Chennai are sourced from:

- In-house production: Programmes produced by DD Chennai professionals utilizing Doordarshan infrastructure, including coverage of events 'live' by DD Chennai .
- Commissioned programmes: Programmes produced by persons of proven merit with funds provided by DD Chennai.
- Sponsored programmes: Privately produced programmes telecast by DD Chennai on payment of a fee in exchange for Free Commercial Time.
- Royalty programmes: Programmes acquired by DD Chennai from outside producers on payment of royalty for single or multiple telecasts.
- Acquired Programmes: Programmes/events acquired from foreign companies on payment of rights fee.
- Educational/Development programmes: Educational and Development programmes produced by different agencies of the Government.
- Self-financed commissioning: The initial production cost of these programmes is met by the private producer. DD Chennai reimburses the production cost to the producer after commencement of telecast. The programme is marketed by DD Chennai. The scheme also has provisions for payment of bonus on approved production cost on attainment of high TRPs, and for reduction of production cost in case of poor performance of programme.
- Narrowcasting of Agricultural Programmes through LPTs: The TNAU in collaboration with Doordarshan Kendra, Chennai has recently started the "Narrow casting of agricultural programmes through LPT" for the benefit of farmers and the general public in and around Coimbatore district.
- To focus on Tamil literature and folklore: DD Chennai is concentrating on Tamil folklore and literature. DD Chennai have started work in this regard. DD Chennai would broadcast programmes relating to the history of Tamil, make serials of Tamil novels, and televise short stories of contemporary writers.

== Programming coverage ==
- DD Chennai TV's Transmitters

Transmitters at various locations in Tamil Nadu

- Tamil Nadu

HPTs - 9, Power - 10, K.W Range - 70 km

- Chennai
- Dharmapuri
- Kodaikanal
- Kumbakonam
- Rameshwaram
- Chennai (DD News)
- Kodaikanal (DD News)
- Chennai (Podhigai channel),
- Chennai (Digital)

LPT - 54,100 W Range 15 km Ambasamudram, Ambur, Arani, Arcot, Attur, Cheyyar, Chidambaram, Coimbatore, Coonoor, Courtalam, Cuddalore, Denkanikotta, Erode, Gudiyatam, Kallakuruchi, Krishnagiri, Marthandam, Mayuram, Nagapattinam, Nagarcoil, Nattan, Neyveli, Palani, Pattukottai, Peranampet, Pollachi, Pudukkottai, Rajapalayam, Salem, Shankaran Kovil, Thanjavur, Thiruvaiyaru, Tindivanam, Tiruchendur, Tiruchirapalli, Tiruneiveli, Tirupattur, Tiruvannamalai, Tuticorin, Udagamandalam, Udumalpet, Vandavasi, Vaniyambadi, Vellore, Villupuram.

UHF) 20 K.W Range 70 km Coimbatore (DD News), Erode (DD News), Madurai (DD News), Salem (DD News), Tiruchirapalli (DD News), Tirunelveli (DD News), Tirupattur (DD News), Tuticorin (DD News), Vellore (DD News)

VLPT - 7 Gingee, Kanchipuram, Mettupalayam, Tiruvanamalai, Valliur, Valparai, Vaza Padi XSER - 1 Dindigul

- Pondicherry

HPT - 1 Pondicherry (int) LPT - 3 Karaikal, Pondicherry, Pondicherry (DD News) VLPT - 2 Mahe, Yanam

== DD sister channels ==
Tamil
Channel	Type	Notes
DD Podhigai	Tamil General Entertainment Channel	
DD Sports	Sports Channel	
DD News and DD India	News Channel	
DD National	Hindi General Entertainment Channel	

== Technology ==
The country's largest public broadcaster, Doordarshan Kendra Chennai was under the process of modernization during the forthcoming commonwealth games, DD would relay its signals on latest technology of High Definition. Process of establishing four Regional DD studios including, DD Delhi, DD Mumbai, DD Kolkata and DD Chennai is ongoing. The high-definition studios would help to relay digital signal to all the viewers of DD as it would drastically improve the quality of picture and sound of the channel.

Process of digitalization of the transmission system was already under process and it was expected that in the years to come the process would be completed, DD adding that for the modernization of the DD, new equipments were being purchased.

== History of channel name ==
The name Podhigai was suggested by the viewers themselves. It is named after the Podhigai Hills situated in Tirunelveli district. This hill range is part of the Western Ghats of Southern India. This hill range is famous for its association with Sage Agastya. Legend has it that Agastya created Tamil in this hill. The Thamirabarani River originates here.

The channel offers a variety of programmes with films, infotainment programmes, news, dramas and current affairs being most prominent. The first Tamil Weekdays serial was telecast on 7 November 1995 as Viluthugal. It is the only regional language satellite channel with terrestrial transmission. Terrestrial transmission is limited to major cities in Tamil Nadu.

== Programming ==
=== Fiction series ===
Premiere date	Series	Timing
Week Day Series
14 April 2025	Sarojini	09:05
19 January 2024	Shakthi IPS	09:00; 06:30
19 January 2024	Budget Kudumbam	08:00
19 January 2024	Thayamma Kudumbathaar	08:30
Week End Series
21 January 2024	Mahakavi Bharathi	09:00

=== Non-fiction ===
Premiere date	Series	Episodes
18 August 2016	Ezham Arivu: Search for Tamil Nadu's Young Scientist	172
4 June 2023	Dhinam Oru Kadhai	270
17 September 2023	Aram Namam Ayiram	200
19 January 2024	Thirumanthiram	120
19 January 2024	Valikku Vazhi	120
28 January 2024	Amudham Aharam	16

== See also ==
- List of programs broadcast by DD National
- All India Radio
- Ministry of Information and Broadcasting
- DD Free Dish
- List of South Asian television channels by country
- Media in Chennai
