= Charukesi (film) =

- Theatrical release poster
- Directed by: Suresh Krissna
- Screenplay by: Suresh Krissna
- Based on: Charukesi by Venkat
- Produced by: R. Arun
- Starring: Y. Gee. Mahendra; Suhasini Maniratnam
- Cinematography: Sanjay BL
- Edited by: Richard
- Music by: Deva
- Production companies: Arun Visualz; Madras Cine Production
- Distributed by: E5 Entertainments
- Release date: 12 June 2026
- Running time: 146 minutes
- Country: India
- Language: Tamil

Charukesi (transl. With beautiful hair) is a 2026 Indian Tamil-language musical drama film directed by Suresh Krissna, based on the play written by Venkat. The film stars Y. Gee. Mahendra reprising his role from the play as the title character, and Suhasini Maniratnam. It was released on 12 June 2026 to mixed reviews from critics.

== Plot ==
Charukesi is an ageing Carnatic musician with Alzheimer's disease.

== Cast ==
- Y. Gee. Mahendra as Charukesi
- Suhasini Maniratnam as Bhagyam
- Raj Ayyappa as Sanjay
- Ramya Pandian as Gautami
- Sathyaraj as Raagadevan
- Samuthirakani as Journalist
- Livingston
- Thalaivasal Vijay as Senthil
- Y. G. Madhuvanthi as Reporter
- Sai Dheena as Police Inspector
- Jayaprakash as Neurologist Dr. Jacob Jebastin
- Rithvik
- Preetika

== Production ==
In January 2023, Y. Gee. Mahendra's play Charukesi, first staged in 2021, was announced to be adapted into a film with Vasanth attached as creative director. Vasanth was also confirmed to write the screenplay, with Mahendra excited at the possibility of the script having the touch of Vasanth's mentor, filmmaker K. Balachander. Later however, Suresh Krissna had taken over full-fledged direction. Krissna said he directed the film adaptation at the behest of Rajinikanth, who liked the play.

== Soundtrack ==
The music was composed by Deva. It was his last film before his death in October 2026. He noted that it was long-time wish to compose music for a film revolving around Carnatic music, given his extensive knowledge in the field, and believed Charukesi helped fulfill that wish. Two songs each took 30 minutes to compose, with Deva noting that he had never took so long to compose any song before. A single "Vaa Endrathum" was released on 3 June 2026. Two more songs "Guitare Guitare" and "Aval Thantha Varam" were also released as singles on 8 and 10 June, respectively. All songs were written by Pa. Vijay.

Track listing
No.	Title	Singer(s)	Length
1.	"Vaa Endrathum"	Shankar Mahadevan	7:58
2.	"Guitare Guitare"	Adithya RK, Devu Mathew	3:46
3.	"Aval Thantha Varam"	Shankar Mahadevan	4:44
Total length:			16:28

== Release ==
A preview of Charukesi was held at Four Frames theatre in Chennai in March 2025. The film was theatrically released on 12 June 2026. E5 Entertainments distributed the film in Tamil Nadu. It began streaming on Amazon Prime Video from 3 July.

=== Reception ===
News Today called it a "heartfelt and emotional cinematic experience that celebrates the healing power of music and the timeless value of relationships", highlighting the screenplay and music. Ashwin S of Cinema Express wrote, "While Charukesi can remind you of age-old Tamil cinema tropes wrapped in some new-age making, the film misses the beat quite often". Harshini SV of The Times of India wrote, "The film, when at its best, is melodious and painfully soothing, but you wish it found its rhythm much sooner".

=== Box office ===
Trade analysts considered the film an underperformer in its opening week.
