= Adukku Malli =

- Theatrical release poster
- Directed by: K. S. Gopalakrishnan
- Written by: K. S. Gopalakrishnan
- Produced by: Naseem Begum; S. Alamelu
- Starring: Vijayakumar; Sujatha; Thengai Srinivasan
- Cinematography: Dutt
- Edited by: R. Devarajan
- Music by: Shankar–Ganesh
- Production company: Meena Art Pictures
- Release date: 20 October 1979
- Country: India
- Language: Tamil

Adukku Malli (transl. Layered Jasmine) is a 1979 Indian Tamil-language film directed by K. S. Gopalakrishnan. The film stars Vijayakumar, Sujatha and Thengai Srinivasan. It was released on 20 October 1979, and became a success.

== Plot ==
The story is about how the deep friendship between Vijayakumar, a Hindu, and Thengai Srinivasan, a Muslim goes beyond all conventional obstacles and how the friendly relationship between Srinivasan and Sujatha, Vijayakumar's wife and later widow, is tested by society.

== Cast ==
- Vijayakumar
- Sujatha
- Thengai Srinivasan
- K. Samarasam
- Y. G. Mahendran
- Vanitha Krishnachandran

== Soundtrack ==
The soundtrack was composed by Shankar–Ganesh.

Track listing
No.	Title	Lyrics	Singer(s)	Length
1.	"Aayiram Aandugal"	Kannadasan	Vani Jairam
2.	"Munnal Nadanthathu"	A. Maruthakasi	S. P. Balasubrahmanyam, P. Susheela
3.	"Thennamarathil"	A. Maruthakasi	Malaysia Vasudevan, Rani

== Reception ==
Naagai Dharuman of Anna praised the cast, music, direction and the film's message noted the film sometimes gives a play like feel and concluded saying this is not a paper flower, it is a bridal jasmine that attracts women.
