= Padma Seshadri Bala Bhavan =

- Tamil Nadu Chennai | Coimbatore | Cuddalore Karnataka; Bangalore Telangana Hyderabad; India

Information
- School type: Senior Secondary School
- Motto: "Knowledge is Power"
- Established: 1959
- Founder: Rajalakshmi Parthasarathy & Vanjulam Chari and ladies of NLRC
- School district: Chennai, Coimbatore, Bangalore, Hyderabad
- Dean: Mrs. Sheela Rajendra
- Director: Mrs. Sheela Rajendra
- Principal: Mrs. S. Vasanthi (Nungambakkam Branch) Geetha Govindarajan(KK Nagar Branch); Mrs.Vijayalakshmi (Siruseri branch)
- Staff: 600
- Grades: K to Grade 12
- Gender: Co-educational
- Enrollment: 12000
- Classes offered: KG to Class 12
- Language: English
- Colours: Bright blue and Dark Blue
- Affiliation: Central Board of Secondary Education, India
- Information: 29 Alagirisami Salai, K.K.Nagar, Chennai – 600 078 (Ph: +91 44 23663165); 15 Lake First Main Road, Nungambakkam, Chennai – 600 034 (Ph: +91 44 28172459)
- Uniform: Primary(LKG, UKG):Red/green checked shirts, red/green shorts in alternate years and similar for girls. High School(1st-5th): blue checked shirts, blue shorts and similar for girls. Secondary(6th-8th): Ashfab colours: brown Striped shirts, brown shorts/pants and pink salwar kameez for girls. Senior Secondary(9th-12th) Yellow and grey checks with grey pant for boys and Grey jacket, grey and checks top for girls. White uniform on Mondays
- Website: psbbschools.ac.in

Padma Seshadri Bala Bhavan (PSBB) is a group of schools located in Chennai, India. The school was founded by educationalist Rajalakshmi Parthasarathy (1925–2019), Vanjulam Chari and many other ladies of Nungambakkam Ladies Recreation Club (NLRC).

== History ==
The PSBB School in Chennai was established in 1958 by a group of housewives of the Nungambakkam Ladies Recreation Club. There were 13 students in a thatched shed on the terrace of the residence of the dean and director of the school, Mrs. Y. G. Parthasarathy. The land was donated by the family of the famous Table Tennis Player, Venugopal Chandrasekhar. At the time, the school did not have many facilities. Today, the school has 5 branches (including PSBB Millennium) with over 8,000 students and 500 staff.

The school was started with the vision of providing children with an Indianised version of education, one that would promote knowledge of Sanskrit shlokas, music, dance and reflect the Indian tradition.

In 1959, one year after its inception, the school shifted to a campus of its own at the present premises in Nungambakkam. It followed the Madras Matriculation System unit of Madras University. As the school grew, the need to extend its branches arose and thus emerged the T. P. Road Junior School in 1971, as an annex to the school in Nungambakkam. In 1978, the school was affiliated to the Central Board of Secondary Educations, New Delhi.

In 1976 another branch of the PSBB School, affiliated to the Central Board of Secondary Education, was started in a residential area of K. K. Nagar with 5-acre (20,000 m^{2}) surroundings. The K. K. Nagar branch is one of its biggest schools in the city.

In 2010, Mrs.Y.G. Parthasarathy, Dean of the PSBB Schools, received the Padma Shri in Education and Literature from the Government of India.

In 2012–2013, the PSBB group of schools was ranked first in the South zone and came third in India under the Day Schools Category as per the EducationWorld – C Fore Survey 2011.

Mrs. Y.G. Parthasarathy died on 6 August 2019.

== Branches ==
- Chennai
  - PSBB K.K.Nagar
  - PSBB Nungambakkam, PSBB Lake Area, also known as Main School, the oldest branch of the PSBB group of schools
  - PSBB T.P.Road (T. Nagar), an annexe of Nungambakkam
  - PSBB Siruseri, at the L&T Eden Park, the newest branch of the PSBB group of schools
  - PSBB Millennium School, Grand Southern Trunk Road (Nursery), Porur and DLF Garden City, Thazhambur, OMR (for classes Pre-KG to Std. XII (as from the academic year 2015–16)
- Coimbatore
  - The PSBB Millennium School, Somayampalayam
- Cuddalore
  - The PSBB Millennium School
- Bangalore
  - PSBB Learning Leadership Academy ( Lakshmipura, in Bannerghatta Road )
- Hyderabad
  - PSBB Millennium School

== Controversies ==
Interview with A. R. Rahman in 2012. After the death of his father R. K. Shekhar, the family faced financial difficulties and hardships. Rahman, who was studying at Padma Seshadri Bala Bhavan, had to work to support the family, which led to him regularly missing classes and failing exams. Rahman and his mother had very bad experiences with the school authorities for not paying fees. In a later interview, Rahman recalled facing humiliation at school due to his circumstances and that Padma Seshadri Bala Bhavan's authorities harshly criticized his mother for his lack of attendance, allegedly telling her: “Take your son and go begging in the back streets of Kodambakkam, maybe they will give you money.”

=== Drowning accident ===
A 10-year-old boy drowned in the swimming pool of the Padma Seshadri Bala Bhavan's school at K.K Nagar, in August 2012. Police arrested five people, including three swim coaches, in connection with the death of M. Ranjan of class 4, the child of movie producer R N R Manohar. The boy was missing at the end of the swim session. According to the city police, Ranjan allegedly experienced nausea after completing his second lap in a four-foot deep swimming pool. He was seen climbing up the ladder to get out, but fell into the water. Ranjan was rushed to a medical facility where he was pronounced dead. On receiving a complaint filed by Ranjan's father, the police arrested the swim coaches for causing death by negligence, following a preliminary post-mortem report that revealed the boy had drowned. The school had outsourced coaching to a private firm where four coaches had been assigned. Police said the witnesses gave contradictory accounts about what happened during the swim session and the investigating officer said that the student was alive when he was pulled out of the water, but was not properly resuscitated. Investigators said the boy had drowned due to the incompetence of swim instructors and trainers.

The Deputy Commissioner of Police told NDTV that the coaches were standing around the pool when the students were in the water and also said that the coaches should have been alert and watchful in the water. Pattali Makkal Katchi's leader S. Ramadoss ordered the arrest of the school's correspondent. He said, "It just demonstrates how schools that extract lakhs of rupees as fees and fleece in the name of swimming lessons do not pay attention to safety. All such illegal swimming pools in private schools should be shut down."

The Madras High Court called for details of the fees earned by the school for swimming and other extra-curricular activities the next day after the student's death. At the court, senior lawyer Vijay Narayan said that the school had swimming lessons during the day and that every student in the school had to compulsorily sign up for swimming, although the pool could accommodate a maximum of 15 students at a time. The counsel said, "If 30 boys are placed in the pool under the guidance of one coach, such accidents are bound to happen."

=== Sexual abuse allegations ===
PSBB school suspended Rajagopalan, a male teacher who was eventually arrested after many allegations of sexual harassment were reported against him by current students and alumni of the school. The school made the move after over a 1,000 alumni coerced, such as actress Lakshmi Priyaa Chandramouli and the CEO of AGS Cinemas Archana Kalpathi, demanding a full inquiry into the allegations. The teacher has been accused of touching students inappropriately, comments on students' bodies inappropriately, slut-shaming them, asking them out, turning up to online class topless while only wearing a towel around his waist, and sharing links to pornography to his students. The allegations started to pile up when a former student of PSBB, sharing an instance of sexual harassment one of her friends experienced at the school from the teacher, via Instagram. Moments after that, several other students posted about their own experiences, hence sparking an influx of allegations of similar misbehaviour from him.

Y. G. Mahendran, one of the Trustees of the school's Board, confirmed the suspension pending inquiry. Several politicians of Tamil Nadu also joined the demand for justice, including the DMK's MPs Kanimozhi Karunanidhi, Dayanidhi Maran and Thamizhachi Thangapandian, Congress MP Jothimani and PMK chief Ramadoss. Maran also wrote to the Union Minister for Education, Ramesh Pokhriyal, seeking appropriate investigation into the matter and to probe lapses in the mechanism that is there to address similar issues. Speaking to the reporters, Tamil Nadu School Education minister Anbil Mahesh Poyyamozhi said the department would take action against the teacher if he was found guilty. Social media has been abuzz with demands of justice for the survivors and accountability from the management. A number of right wing activists, including a few Bharatiya Janata Party (BJP) leaders have come out in support of the school. but the justice for the girls who get abuse are still denied by the school management.
