= Paul Willemen =

Belgian-born British professor and author (1944–2012)

- Born: 17 August 1944; Belgium
- Died: 13 May 2012 (aged 67); London, United Kingdom
- Occupations: Author, professor
- Years active: 1968–2012
- Spouse: Roma Willemen
- Children: 1

Paul Willemen (17 August 1944 – 13 May 2012) was a Belgian-born British professor, author and essayist. According to the British Film Institute, he was regarded as "a pioneering figure in the revolution in thinking about the cinema that began in the 1970s". His essays and books have dealt with cinema.

== Biography ==
Born into a Dutch-speaking family in Belgium, Willemen travelled to London in 1968 to teach about film at the BFI Education Department and the Society for Education in Film and Television. According to the Society for Cinema and Media Studies, he played a key role in the 1970s and 1980s to "define the subject area in the [United Kingdom] and also [help] to shape and mould the subject's theoretical terrain and institutional structures". He served as a professor for the Edinburgh Napier University and the Ulster University.

Willemen was married to Roma Willemen and has a daughter, named Nikki. He lived in London until his death in 2012 by cancer.

== Bibliography ==
- Willemen, Paul; Milne, Tom (1987). The Encyclopedia of Horror Movies. Harper. ISBN 978-00-60550-50-9.
- Willemen, Paul (1993). Looks and Frictions: Essays in Cultural Studies and Film Theory. British Film Institute. ISBN 978-08-517039-9-2.
- Willemen, Paul; Rajadhyaksha, Ashish (1994). Encyclopaedia of Indian Cinema. British Film Institute. ISBN 978-08-51704-55-5.
