= Mrs YGP =

Indian journalist, educationist and social worker (1925-2019)

- Born: Rajalakshmi; 27 November 1925; British India
- Died: 6 August 2019 (aged 93); Chennai, Tamil Nadu, India
- Education: University of Madras
- Occupations: Educationist, journalist and social worker
- Spouse: Y. G. Parthasarathy
- Children: 2, including Y. G. Mahendran,
- Relatives: K. Balaji (cousin); T. Rangachari (grandfather); Vyjayanthimala (niece)
- Awards: Padma Shri

Rajalakshmi Parthasarathy (27 November 1925 – 6 August 2019), better known as Mrs YGP, was an Indian journalist, educationist and social worker. She was the founder and dean of the Padma Seshadri Bala Bhavan. Rajalakshmi was awarded the Padma Shri in 2010, India's fourth highest civil honour for her contribution to literature and education.

== Personal life ==
Rajalakshmi was born in Madras on 27 November 1925 into an affluent and educated family, the daughter of Burmah Shell employee R. Parthasarathy and his wife Alamelu Amma. Her father was the son of Indian independence activist, Dewan Bahadur T. Rangachari and her mother was a homemaker. Her cousin K. Balaji was an actor and director in the Tamil film industry.

Rajalakshmi studied at St. John's School and Holy Cross College, Madras and received a graduate degree in journalism from the University of Madras in 1947, at a time when few women in India undertook higher studies. She was the only woman in her class and the first woman in her family to graduate. Later, she completed her M. Ed. and acquired a master's degree in history from the University of Madras.

She was married to playwright Y. G. Parthasarathy, and they had two sons, Y. G. Rajendran and Y. G. Mahendran, a Tamil film and stage actor. Rajalakshmi died in Chennai on 6 August 2019 at age 93 due to a cardiac arrest. She was replaced by Mrs. Sheela Rajendran, her daughter-in-law.

== Career ==
On completion of her graduation, Rajalakshmi worked as a journalist with The Hindu and the Tamil weekly, Kumudam. She however quit her job after marriage and started the Padma Seshadri Bala Bhavan in 1958.

=== Padma Seshadri Bala Bhavan ===
In 1958, Rajalakshmi started a school with 13 students along with members of the Nungambakkam Ladies Recreation Club in a shed in the terrace of her house in Nungambakkam and named it Padma Seshadri Bala Bhavan in deference to the wishes of one of its benefactors, R. M. Seshadri, who expressed his wish for the school to be named after his wife. The next year, the school acquired its own building. In 1971, the school established its first branch, in Nungambakkam (which is also known as the main school). Since then, the school has grown manifold and in 2009, comprised five branches with over 8,000 students and 500 staff members. Rajalakshmi served as the dean and director of the school since its inception in 1958, until her death. In 2010, it was reported to have more than 10,000 students.

== Awards ==
- On 26 January 2010, Rajalakshmi was awarded the Padma Shri, India's fourth highest civil honour for her contribution to literature and education.
- 'Achievement Medal for Leadership and Commitment to Excellence in Education' by the U.S-based Center for Excellence in Education.
- 'Vayoshreshtha Samman' award from the Government of India.
- 'Paul Harris Fellow Award' by the Rotary Club of Madras.

== Works ==
- Excellence Beyond the Classroom: A Memoir of YGP. Frank Bros. & Company. 2004. ISBN 9788171706976.
