= Ashish Rajadhyaksha =

Indian film scholar and cultural theorist

- Born: Ashish Vithal Rajadhyaksha; 12 March 1957 (age 69); Bombay, India
- Occupations: Film scholar, cultural theorist
- Years active: 1982–present
- Spouse: Pushpamala N. (divorced)
- Website: ashishrajadhyaksha.academia.edu

Ashish Vithal Rajadhyaksha (born 12 March 1957) is an Indian film scholar, art curator and cultural theorist. He was a Senior Fellow at the Bangalore-based Centre for the Study of Culture and Society.

== Early life ==
Ashish Vithal Rajadhyaksha was born on 12 March 1957 in Bombay (later renamed Mumbai), India. His father was a soldier in the Indian army. Rajadhyaksha's serious interest in cinema developed in the late 1970s. In 1978, he graduated from the University of Bombay with a Bachelor of Science degree.

== Career ==
Rajadhyaksha developed a keenness for Ritwik Ghatak's films after attending a course organised by the Film and Television Institute and the National Film Archive of India in the early 1980s. The first book that he authored was Ritwik Ghatak: A Return to the Epic, published in 1982. Starting in 1983, he wrote numerous articles for publications such as the New Delhi–based Journal of Arts & Ideas and Calcutta (now Kolkata)–based Journal of the Moving Image. He authored, with Paul Willemen, Encyclopaedia of Indian Cinema in 1994. After a long hiatus, Rajadhyaksha's next book, a solo, was Indian Cinema in the Time of Celluloid: From Bollywood to the Emergency in 2009, followed by The Last Cultural Mile: An Inquiry into Technology and Governance in India in 2011, and Indian Cinema: A Very Short Introduction in 2016.

== Personal life ==
Rajadhyaksha was married to Pushpamala N., a Bangalore-based artist. The couple later divorced.

== Books written ==
- Rajadhyaksha, Ashish (1982). Ritwik Ghatak: A Return to the Epic. Screen Unit. OCLC 10516837.
- Rajadhyaksha, Ashish; Willemen, Paul (1998) [1994]. Encyclopaedia of Indian Cinema. Oxford University Press. ISBN 0-19-563579-5.
- Rajadhyaksha, Ashish (2009). Indian Cinema in the Time of Celluloid: From Bollywood to the Emergency. Indiana University Press. ISBN 978-0-253-22048-6.
- Rajadhyaksha, Ashish (2011). The Last Cultural Mile: An Inquiry into Technology and Governance in India. Centre for Internet and Society. OCLC 925374086.
- Rajadhyaksha, Ashish (2016). Indian Cinema: A Very Short Introduction. Oxford University Press. ISBN 978-0-19-872309-7.
