= V. Dakshinamoorthy discography =

Carnatic musician

V. Dakshinamoorthy (9 December 1919 – 2 August 2013) was an Indian Carnatic musician and composer of Malayalam, Tamil and Hindi films, predominantly in Malayalam. He has set scores for the songs in over 125 films. He composed as many as 974 songs over a period of 63 years.

== Film songs ==
=== Prominent Tamil songs ===
Song	Movie	Year	Singer	Lyrics	Musician
Aandavan Illa Ulagamithu	Oru Oodhappu Kan Simittugiradhu	1976	Vani Jayaram	Kannadasan	V.Dakshinamoorthy
Nalla Manam Vaazhga	Oru Oodhappu Kan Simittugiradhu	1976	Yesudas	Kumaradevan	V.Dakshinamoorthy
Murukko Kai murukku	Oru Oodhappu Kan Simittugiradhu	1976	T. K. Kala	Kannadasan	V.Dakshinamoorthy
Nandha En Nila	Nandha En Nila	1977	S. P. Balasubramaniam		V.Dakshinamoorthy
Muthu Muthu Punnagaiye	Oru Kovil Iru Deepangal	1979	S.P. Balasubramaniam and P. Susheela		V.Dakshinamoorthy

=== Malayalam songs ===
Song	Movie	Year	Singer	Lyrics	Musician
Imbamerum Ithalaakum	Nallathanka	1950	P Leela, Vaikkam Mani	Abhayadev	V.Dakshinamoorthy
Shambho Shambho Shivane	Nallathanka	1950	P Leela	Abhayadev	V.Dakshinamoorthy
Ammathan Prema Soubhaagya	Nallathanka	1950	P Leela	Abhayadev	V.Dakshinamoorthy
Shambho Njan	Nallathanka	1950	P Leela	Abhayadev	V.Dakshinamoorthy
Choriyuka Madhumaari Nilaave	Chandrika	1950	Ganabhooshanam N Lalitha	P Bhaskaran	V.Dakshinamoorthy
Kezhuka Aathmasakhi	Chandrika	1950		P Bhaskaran	V.Dakshinamoorthy
Anpezhum Priya Thozhikale	Chandrika	1950	Jikki (PG Krishnaveni)	Thumbaman Padmanabhan Kutty	V.Dakshinamoorthy
Hello My Dear Ting Ting	Chandrika	1950	VN Sundaram	Thumbaman Padmanabhan Kutty	V.Dakshinamoorthy
Vana Gaayike Vanil Varoo Naayike	Jeevithanouka	1951	P Leela, Mehboob	Abhayadev	V.Dakshinamoorthy
Paahi Thaaye	Jeevithanouka	1951	Kaviyoor CK Revamma, Mehboob	Abhayadev	V.Dakshinamoorthy
Akaale Aarum Kaividam	Jeevithanouka	1951	Mehboob	Abhayadev	V.Dakshinamoorthy
Aanathalayolam Venna	Jeevithanouka	1951	Alappuzha Pushpam, Sebastian Kunjukunju Bhagavathar	Abhayadev	V.Dakshinamoorthy
Aanandamiyalum Baale	Jeevithanouka	1951	P Leela	Abhayadev	V.Dakshinamoorthy
Gathiyethumilla	Jeevithanouka	1951	Kaviyoor CK Revamma	Abhayadev	V.Dakshinamoorthy
Thornidumo Kanneer	Jeevithanouka	1951	Kaviyoor CK Revamma, Mehboob	Abhayadev	V.Dakshinamoorthy
Thoraathasrudhaara	Jeevithanouka	1951	Kaviyoor CK Revamma	Abhayadev	V.Dakshinamoorthy
Paapamaanithu Baale	Jeevithanouka	1951	Ghantasala	Abhayadev	V.Dakshinamoorthy
Paathakalil Vaaneedumee	Jeevithanouka	1951	Kaviyoor CK Revamma	Abhayadev	V.Dakshinamoorthy
Ghoraandhakaaramaaya	Jeevithanouka	1951	P Leela, T Lokanathan	Abhayadev	V.Dakshinamoorthy
Premarajyamarnu	Jeevithanouka	1951	V.Dakshinamoorthy, P Leela	Abhayadev	V.Dakshinamoorthy
Pasiyaaluyirvaadi	Jeevithanouka	1951	Kaviyoor CK Revamma	Abhayadev	V.Dakshinamoorthy
Vaarthinkal Thaalameduthavar [Magdalana Mariyam]	Jeevithanouka	1951	V.Dakshinamoorthy, Kaviyoor CK Revamma, Mehboob	Vallathol	V.Dakshinamoorthy
Karuthidaathey	Jeevithanouka	1951	Alappuzha Pushpam	Abhayadev	V.Dakshinamoorthy
Gaayaka Gaayaka	Navalokam	1951	P Leela	P Bhaskaran	V.Dakshinamoorthy
Malayala Malarvaadiye	Navalokam	1951	Kaviyoor CK Revamma	P Bhaskaran	V.Dakshinamoorthy
Thankakkinaakkal	Navalokam	1951	Kozhikode Abdul Khader	P Bhaskaran	V.Dakshinamoorthy
Ha Pon Pularkaalam	Navalokam	1951		P Bhaskaran	V.Dakshinamoorthy
Bhoovil Bhaashpadhaara	Navalokam	1951	Kozhikode Abdul Khader	P Bhaskaran	V.Dakshinamoorthy
Maanjidaathe Madhura	Navalokam	1951	P Leela, Kozhikode Abdul Khader	P Bhaskaran	V.Dakshinamoorthy
Puthusoorya Shobhayil	Navalokam	1951	V.Dakshinamoorthy	P Bhaskaran	V.Dakshinamoorthy
Sahajare Sahajare	Navalokam	1951	Kozhikode Abdul Khader	P Bhaskaran	V.Dakshinamoorthy
Sundara Jeevitha	Navalokam	1951		P Bhaskaran	V.Dakshinamoorthy
Parithaapamithe Ha Jeevithame	Navalokam	1951	Kozhikode Abdul Khader	P Bhaskaran	V.Dakshinamoorthy
Maayunnu Vanasooname	Navalokam	1951	P Leela	P Bhaskaran	V.Dakshinamoorthy
Karutha Penne	Navalokam	1951	Alappuzha Pushpam	P Bhaskaran	V.Dakshinamoorthy
Aananda Gaanam Paadi	Navalokam	1951	Kaviyoor CK Revamma	P Bhaskaran	V.Dakshinamoorthy
Kezhuka Thaaye	Amma	1952	P Leela	P Bhaskaran	V.Dakshinamoorthy
Aananda Sudinam	Amma	1952	V.Dakshinamoorthy, P Leela, Chorus	P Bhaskaran	V.Dakshinamoorthy
Vanamaali Varavaayi Sakhiye	Amma	1952	P Leela	P Bhaskaran	V.Dakshinamoorthy
Aruthe Painkiliye	Amma	1952	Janamma David	P Bhaskaran	V.Dakshinamoorthy
Pon thiruvonam	Amma	1952	P Leela, Chorus	P Bhaskaran	V.Dakshinamoorthy
Udamayum Elimayum	Amma	1952	Ghantasala	P Bhaskaran	V.Dakshinamoorthy
Churukkathil Randu Dinam	Amma	1952	Balakrishna Menon	P Bhaskaran	V.Dakshinamoorthy
Paavanam Paavanam	Amma	1952		P Bhaskaran	V.Dakshinamoorthy
Neenaal	Amma	1952	Ghantasala	P Bhaskaran	V.Dakshinamoorthy
Ammathaan Paarilaalambame	Amma	1952	Kaviyoor CK Revamma	P Bhaskaran	V.Dakshinamoorthy
Varunee Premaramani	Amma	1952	Gokulapalan, Kaviyoor CK Revamma	P Bhaskaran	V.Dakshinamoorthy
Aruma Sodara	Amma	1952	V.Dakshinamoorthy, P Leela, Chorus	P Bhaskaran	V.Dakshinamoorthy
Aniyaay Puzhayil	Amma	1952	V.Dakshinamoorthy, P Leela	P Bhaskaran	V.Dakshinamoorthy
Kaniviyennoren	Velakkaaran	1953		Abhayadev	V.Dakshinamoorthy
Pranayada Maanasa	Velakkaaran	1953		Abhayadev	V.Dakshinamoorthy
Pichakappoo Choodum	Velakkaaran	1953	Kaviyoor CK Revamma	Abhayadev	V.Dakshinamoorthy
Vidooramee	Velakkaaran	1953	Kaviyoor CK Revamma	Thirunayinaarkurichi Madhavan Nair	V.Dakshinamoorthy
Aathirathannaananda Kaalamaay	Velakkaaran	1953	Chorus, Kaviyoor CK Revamma	Abhayadev	V.Dakshinamoorthy
Paahimaam Jagadeeshwara	Velakkaaran	1953	Augustine Joseph	Abhayadev	V.Dakshinamoorthy
Alayukayaam	Velakkaaran	1953	P Leela, Kaviyoor CK Revamma	Abhayadev	V.Dakshinamoorthy
Aanandamennum	Velakkaaran	1953	P Leela, Augustine Joseph	Abhayadev	V.Dakshinamoorthy
Azhakin Ponnodavumaay	Velakkaaran	1953		Abhayadev	V.Dakshinamoorthy
Vanikayilingane	Velakkaaran	1953		Abhayadev	V.Dakshinamoorthy
Mangalacharithe	Velakkaaran	1953	P Leela	Abhayadev	V.Dakshinamoorthy
Maaye Mahaa Maaye	Velakkaaran	1953	P Leela	Abhayadev	V.Dakshinamoorthy
Paadupettu Paadangalil	Shariyo Thetto	1953	Jose Prakash	Thikkurissy Sukumaran Nair	V.Dakshinamoorthy
Kannuneer Nee Choriyaathe	Shariyo Thetto	1953	Jose Prakash	Thikkurissy Sukumaran Nair	V.Dakshinamoorthy
Vaarmazhaville Va	Shariyo Thetto	1953	P Leela, Jose Prakash	Thikkurissy Sukumaran Nair	V.Dakshinamoorthy
Thaarame Thaanuvaru	Shariyo Thetto	1953	Jose Prakash	Thikkurissy Sukumaran Nair	V.Dakshinamoorthy
Kamala Lochana Kanna	Shariyo Thetto	1953	Meena Sulochana	Thikkurissy Sukumaran Nair	V.Dakshinamoorthy
Pokaam Pokaam	Shariyo Thetto	1953	Jose Prakash	Thikkurissy Sukumaran Nair	V.Dakshinamoorthy
Anuraagamohanam	Shariyo Thetto	1953	Meena Sulochana	Thikkurissy Sukumaran Nair	V.Dakshinamoorthy
Vrindaavana Rani	Shariyo Thetto	1953		Thikkurissy Sukumaran Nair	V.Dakshinamoorthy
Thoomulla Chendupole	Shariyo Thetto	1953		Thikkurissy Sukumaran Nair	V.Dakshinamoorthy
Premathin Muraliyoothi	Shariyo Thetto	1953		Thikkurissy Sukumaran Nair	V.Dakshinamoorthy
Balanaam Prahlaadaneppole	Shariyo Thetto	1953	Kuttappan Bhagavathar, Vijayalakshmi	Thikkurissy Sukumaran Nair	V.Dakshinamoorthy
Sreeraama Seethaye	Shariyo Thetto	1953		Thikkurissy Sukumaran Nair	V.Dakshinamoorthy
Kadha Jeevithagathithan	Shariyo Thetto	1953		Thikkurissy Sukumaran Nair	V.Dakshinamoorthy
Tharumo	Shariyo Thetto	1953		Thikkurissy Sukumaran Nair	V.Dakshinamoorthy
Prathikaara Chintha	Shariyo Thetto	1953	V.Dakshinamoorthy	Thikkurissy Sukumaran Nair	V.Dakshinamoorthy
Jayamangala	Shariyo Thetto	1953	V.Dakshinamoorthy, P Leela	Thikkurissy Sukumaran Nair	V.Dakshinamoorthy
Praanasakhi	Shariyo Thetto	1953	Jose Prakash	Thikkurissy Sukumaran Nair	V.Dakshinamoorthy
Kanna Neeyurangu	Lokaneethi	1953	AM Raja, P Leela	Abhayadev	V.Dakshinamoorthy
Ariyaathe Kinaakkalil	Lokaneethi	1953	AM Raja, Kaviyoor CK Revamma	Abhayadev	V.Dakshinamoorthy
Snehame Lokam	Lokaneethi	1953	Ghantasala	Abhayadev	V.Dakshinamoorthy
Anuraagaamritham	Lokaneethi	1953	P Leela, Gokulapalan	Abhayadev	V.Dakshinamoorthy
Oru Navayugame	Lokaneethi	1953	P Leela, AM Raja, Kaviyoor CK Revamma	Abhayadev	V.Dakshinamoorthy
Komala Mridu	Lokaneethi	1953	P Leela, Kaviyoor CK Revamma	Abhayadev	V.Dakshinamoorthy
Poovaadiyaake	Lokaneethi	1953	Kaviyoor CK Revamma	Abhayadev	V.Dakshinamoorthy
Shokam Enthinaay	Lokaneethi	1953	AM Raja	Abhayadev	V.Dakshinamoorthy
Paavangalil Alivulla	Lokaneethi	1953	AM Raja, Kaviyoor CK Revamma	Abhayadev	V.Dakshinamoorthy
Paadunna Paadunna	Lokaneethi	1953		Abhayadev	V.Dakshinamoorthy
Aadi Aadi Pokum	Lokaneethi	1953		Abhayadev	V.Dakshinamoorthy
Jagadanandhakaraka	Aashadeepam	1953	P Leela, ML Vasanthakumari	Thyagaraja	V.Dakshinamoorthy
Janani Jayikka Neenal	Aashadeepam	1953	P Leela, ML Vasanthakumari	P Bhaskaran	V.Dakshinamoorthy
Graamathin Hridayame	Aashadeepam	1953	Jikki (PG Krishnaveni)	P Bhaskaran	V.Dakshinamoorthy
Maarivilloli	Aashadeepam	1953	Jikki (PG Krishnaveni)	P Bhaskaran	V.Dakshinamoorthy
Sharanam Mayilvaahanaa	Aashadeepam	1953	ML Vasanthakumari	P Bhaskaran	V.Dakshinamoorthy
Panthalittu	Aashadeepam	1953	P Leela, AM Raja	P Bhaskaran	V.Dakshinamoorthy
Karmabhalame	Aashadeepam	1953	Ghantasala	P Bhaskaran	V.Dakshinamoorthy
Veeshi Pon vala	Aashadeepam	1953		P Bhaskaran	V.Dakshinamoorthy
Premamennaal Pulivaal	Aashadeepam	1953		P Bhaskaran	V.Dakshinamoorthy
Poo Veno	Aashadeepam	1953	P Leela	P Bhaskaran	V.Dakshinamoorthy
Jeevithameevidhame	Aashadeepam	1953	P Leela, Nagaiyyah	P Bhaskaran	V.Dakshinamoorthy
Kanmani Vava	Aashadeepam	1953	P Leela	P Bhaskaran	V.Dakshinamoorthy
Kanivolum Kamaneeyahridayam	Snehaseema	1954	P Leela	Abhayadev	V.Dakshinamoorthy
Poyvaroo Nee Poyvaroo	Snehaseema	1954	P Leela	Abhayadev	V.Dakshinamoorthy
Innu Varum En Naayakan	Snehaseema	1954	P Leela	Abhayadev	V.Dakshinamoorthy
Kochilam Kaattathu	Snehaseema	1954	Saroja, Baby Lalitha	Abhayadev	V.Dakshinamoorthy
Mazhayellaam Poyallo	Snehaseema	1954	Saroja, Baby Lalitha	Abhayadev	V.Dakshinamoorthy
Kannum Poottiyuranguka	Snehaseema	1954	P Leela, AM Raja	Abhayadev	V.Dakshinamoorthy
Vannu Vannu Christmas	Snehaseema	1954	AM Raja, Chorus, M Sathyam	Abhayadev	V.Dakshinamoorthy
Maanam Thelinju Mazhakkaru Maanju	Snehaseema	1954	P Leela	Abhayadev	V.Dakshinamoorthy
Anayaathe Nilppu	Snehaseema	1954	P Leela	Abhayadev	V.Dakshinamoorthy
Jagadeeshwara Leelakal	Snehaseema	1954	P Leela, AM Raja	Abhayadev	V.Dakshinamoorthy
Mahalthyaagame	Snehaseema	1954	M Sathyam	Abhayadev	V.Dakshinamoorthy
Adhwaanikkunnavarkkum	Snehaseema	1954	P Leela, Amrutheswari	Abhayadev	V.Dakshinamoorthy
Koottukaar Ninne Vilippathenthe	Snehaseema	1954	Saroja, Baby Lalitha	V Anandakkuttan Nair	V.Dakshinamoorthy
Varunnu Njan	Avan Varunnu	1954	P Leela, AM Raja	Abhayadev	V.Dakshinamoorthy
Avan Varunnoo	Avan Varunnu	1954	AM Raja, LPR Varma	Abhayadev	V.Dakshinamoorthy
Adithozhunnen	Avan Varunnu	1954	Kaviyoor CK Revamma	Abhayadev	V.Dakshinamoorthy
Jeevitham Nukarnnu	Avan Varunnu	1954	V.Dakshinamoorthy, Stella Varghese	Abhayadev	V.Dakshinamoorthy
Ororo Chenchorathan	Avan Varunnu	1954	P Leela, Jose Prakash	Abhayadev	V.Dakshinamoorthy
Maanasa Mohane	Avan Varunnu	1954	P Leela	Abhayadev	V.Dakshinamoorthy
Anputhan Ponnambalathil	Avan Varunnu	1954	AM Raja, Kaviyoor CK Revamma	Abhayadev	V.Dakshinamoorthy
Pinnilaakki Jeevithathil	Avan Varunnu	1954	AM Raja	Abhayadev	V.Dakshinamoorthy
Aasha Kaivediyaathe	Avan Varunnu	1954	AM Raja	Abhayadev	V.Dakshinamoorthy
Vinnin Nilaave	Avan Varunnu	1954	Kaviyoor CK Revamma	Abhayadev	V.Dakshinamoorthy
Kunkumachaarumaninju	Kidappaadam	1955	AM Raja	Abhayadev	V.Dakshinamoorthy
Paavanamaamidamaanee	Kidappaadam	1955	AM Raja	Abhayadev	V.Dakshinamoorthy
Panathinte Neethiyil	Kidappaadam	1955	AM Raja	Abhayadev	V.Dakshinamoorthy
Ennini Njan Nedum	Kidappaadam	1955	AM Raja, Kaviyoor CK Revamma	Abhayadev	V.Dakshinamoorthy
Abhimaanam Vediyaathe	Kidappaadam	1955	AM Raja, LPR Varma	Abhayadev	V.Dakshinamoorthy
Naalathe Lokathil	Kidappaadam	1955	LPR Varma, Stella Varghese	Abhayadev	V.Dakshinamoorthy
Chorayillallo Kannil	Kidappaadam	1955	AM Raja	Abhayadev	V.Dakshinamoorthy
Palanaalil	Kidappaadam	1955	LPR Varma	Abhayadev	V.Dakshinamoorthy
Puthuvarsham	Aathmaarpanam	1956	P Leela, AM Raja	Abhayadev	V.Dakshinamoorthy
Maariville	Aathmaarpanam	1956	AM Raja	Abhayadev	V.Dakshinamoorthy
Hare Muraare	Aathmaarpanam	1956	AM Raja, Jikki (PG Krishnaveni)	Abhayadev	V.Dakshinamoorthy
Vaadathe Nilkkane	Aathmaarpanam	1956	P Leela	Abhayadev	V.Dakshinamoorthy
Aanandavalli	Aathmaarpanam	1956	P Leela, AM Raja	Abhayadev	V.Dakshinamoorthy
Ullathu Chollu Penne	Aathmaarpanam	1956	Soolamangalam Rajalakshmi, TS Kumaresh	Abhayadev	V.Dakshinamoorthy
Mazhamukile Neeridumee	Aathmaarpanam	1956		Abhayadev	V.Dakshinamoorthy
Maanju Povaan	Aathmaarpanam	1956	AM Raja	Abhayadev	V.Dakshinamoorthy
Maniyarayellaam	Aathmaarpanam	1956	P Leela	Abhayadev	V.Dakshinamoorthy
Oru Kaattum Kaattalla	Avar Unarunnoo	1956	AM Raja, Jikki (PG Krishnaveni)	Vayalar	V.Dakshinamoorthy
Kizhakku Ninnoru Pennuvannu	Avar Unarunnoo	1956	Chorus, Jikki (PG Krishnaveni)	Vayalar	V.Dakshinamoorthy
Ariyaamo Choraanu	Avar Unarunnoo	1956	Kamukara	Pala Narayanan Nair	V.Dakshinamoorthy
Puthujeevitham Thaan Kaamitham	Avar Unarunnoo	1956	Kamukara, Lalitha Thampi (R Lalitha)	Pala Narayanan Nair	V.Dakshinamoorthy
Maveli Naattile	Avar Unarunnoo	1956	LPR Varma	Pala Narayanan Nair	V.Dakshinamoorthy
En Maanasame	Avar Unarunnoo	1956	Kamukara, Shyamala	Pala Narayanan Nair	V.Dakshinamoorthy
Paaloli Poonilaa	Avar Unarunnoo	1956	Lalitha Thampi (R Lalitha), LPR Varma	Pala Narayanan Nair	V.Dakshinamoorthy
Aaromal Kunje	Avar Unarunnoo	1956	Sarada	Pala Narayanan Nair	V.Dakshinamoorthy
Oru Mullappanthalil	Avar Unarunnoo	1956	TV Rathnam	Pala Narayanan Nair	V.Dakshinamoorthy
Aalolathirayaadi	Avar Unarunnoo	1956	Chorus	Pala Narayanan Nair	V.Dakshinamoorthy
Maninellin Kathiraadi	Avar Unarunnoo	1956	Chorus	Pala Narayanan Nair	V.Dakshinamoorthy
Innum Kaanum	Naadodikal	1959	P Leela, PB Sreenivas	P Bhaskaran	V.Dakshinamoorthy
Inakkuruvi	Naadodikal	1959	P Leela	P Bhaskaran	V.Dakshinamoorthy
Kaarani raavilen	Naadodikal	1959	Chorus, Punitha, Kamala	P Bhaskaran	V.Dakshinamoorthy
Kannaadiyaattil	Naadodikal	1959	P Leela, Chorus	P Bhaskaran	V.Dakshinamoorthy
Varoo Varoo Munnil	Naadodikal	1959	AP Komala	P Bhaskaran	V.Dakshinamoorthy
Kunkumathin Pottukuthi	Naadodikal	1959	Jikki (PG Krishnaveni)	P Bhaskaran	V.Dakshinamoorthy
Moovandan Maavile	Naadodikal	1959	P Leela	P Bhaskaran	V.Dakshinamoorthy
Onnaanaam Kunnil	Naadodikal	1959	P Leela	P Bhaskaran	V.Dakshinamoorthy
Thekkuthekku Chennoru	Naadodikal	1959	Mehboob	P Bhaskaran	V.Dakshinamoorthy
Lankayil Vaana	Seetha	1960	PB Sreenivas	Abhayadev	V.Dakshinamoorthy
Paattupaadiyurakkaam	Seetha	1960	P Susheela	Abhayadev	V.Dakshinamoorthy
Unni Pirannu	Seetha	1960	AM Raja, Chorus	Abhayadev	V.Dakshinamoorthy
Kaanmu Njan	Seetha	1960	PB Sreenivas	Abhayadev	V.Dakshinamoorthy
Paavana Bharatha	Seetha	1960	PB Sreenivas, AM Raja	Abhayadev	V.Dakshinamoorthy
Raamaraajyathinte	Seetha	1960	AM Raja, Chorus	Abhayadev	V.Dakshinamoorthy
Kanne Nukaru Swargasukham	Seetha	1960	ML Vasanthakumari	Abhayadev	V.Dakshinamoorthy
Veene Paaduka	Seetha	1960	P Susheela	Abhayadev	V.Dakshinamoorthy
Rama Rama	Seetha	1960	AM Raja, Chorus	Abhayadev	V.Dakshinamoorthy
Seethe Lokamaathe	Seetha	1960	PB Sreenivas	Abhayadev	V.Dakshinamoorthy
Nerampoyi Nadanada	Seetha	1960	V.Dakshinamoorthy, Jikki (PG Krishnaveni)	Abhayadev	V.Dakshinamoorthy
Mangalam Neruka	Seetha	1960	S Janaki, Chorus	Abhayadev	V.Dakshinamoorthy
Prajakalundo Prajakalundo	Seetha	1960	PB Sreenivas, AM Raja, Jikki (PG Krishnaveni), Punitha	Abhayadev	V.Dakshinamoorthy
Mindaathathenthaanu	Jnaanasundari	1961	Kamukara	Abhayadev	V.Dakshinamoorthy
Parannu Poyo	Jnaanasundari	1961	Kamukara	Abhayadev	V.Dakshinamoorthy
Onnu Chirikkoo	Jnaanasundari	1961	P Leela, Kamukara	Abhayadev	V.Dakshinamoorthy
Kanyaamariyame Thaaye	Jnaanasundari	1961	P Leela	Abhayadev	V.Dakshinamoorthy
Panineer Malarinorithal	Jnaanasundari	1961	Kamukara	Abhayadev	V.Dakshinamoorthy
Ave Maria	Jnaanasundari	1961	P Leela, Chorus	Abhayadev	V.Dakshinamoorthy
Kezhaathe Kanmani	Jnaanasundari	1961	PB Sreenivas	Abhayadev	V.Dakshinamoorthy
Maathave Daiva Maathaave	Jnaanasundari	1961	P Leela	Abhayadev	V.Dakshinamoorthy
Amma Kanyamani Thante	Jnaanasundari	1961	P Leela	Abhayadev	V.Dakshinamoorthy
Mindaathathenthaanu [Bit]	Jnaanasundari	1961	P Leela	Abhayadev	V.Dakshinamoorthy
Vedanakal Karalin Vedanakal	Jnaanasundari	1961	P Leela	Abhayadev	V.Dakshinamoorthy
Kanda Nalloru Chetta	Jnaanasundari	1961	V.Dakshinamoorthy, Kottayam Santha	Abhayadev	V.Dakshinamoorthy
Appanippam Varum	Jnaanasundari	1961	P Leela	Abhayadev	V.Dakshinamoorthy
Mahaabali Vannaalum	Umminithanka	1961	Chorus	P Bhaskaran	V.Dakshinamoorthy
Vinnilulla Thaarakame	Umminithanka	1961	P Leela	P Bhaskaran	V.Dakshinamoorthy
Velikkunnil Palli manchalu	Umminithanka	1961	P Leela	P Bhaskaran	V.Dakshinamoorthy
Nimishangalenniyenni	Umminithanka	1961	P Leela	P Bhaskaran	V.Dakshinamoorthy
Geethopadesham	Umminithanka	1961	V.Dakshinamoorthy, P Leela, ML Vasanthakumari		V.Dakshinamoorthy
Akkaani Poloru	Umminithanka	1961	V.Dakshinamoorthy, Punitha	Kedamangalam Sadanandan	V.Dakshinamoorthy
Kaavilamme	Umminithanka	1961	P Leela, Chorus	P Gangadharan Nair	V.Dakshinamoorthy
Jay Jagadeesa	Umminithanka	1961	S Janaki	V.Dakshinamoorthy	V.Dakshinamoorthy
Kannuneer Maathram	Umminithanka	1961	P Leela	Abhayadev	V.Dakshinamoorthy
Kamaneeyakeralame (Bit)	Viyarppinte Vila	1962	KJ Yesudas	Abhayadev	V.Dakshinamoorthy
Omanakkanna	Viyarppinte Vila	1962	P Leela	Abhayadev	V.Dakshinamoorthy
Kochu Kuruvi Vaa Vaa	Viyarppinte Vila	1962	KJ Yesudas, P Leela	Abhayadev	V.Dakshinamoorthy
Vighnangalokkeyum	Viyarppinte Vila	1962	V.Dakshinamoorthy	Abhayadev	V.Dakshinamoorthy
Varumo varumo gokulapaala	Viyarppinte Vila	1962	P Leela	Abhayadev	V.Dakshinamoorthy
Kamaneeya keralame	Viyarppinte Vila	1962	P Leela, Renuka	Abhayadev	V.Dakshinamoorthy
Munnottu poku sahaja	Viyarppinte Vila	1962	PB Sreenivas	Abhayadev	V.Dakshinamoorthy
Koottile kiliyaanu njaan	Viyarppinte Vila	1962	P Leela	Abhayadev	V.Dakshinamoorthy
Thedithediyalanju njan	Viyarppinte Vila	1962	P Leela, PB Sreenivas	Abhayadev	V.Dakshinamoorthy
Ilamkaavil bhagavathy	Viyarppinte Vila	1962	Chorus, Renuka, Vinodini	Abhayadev	V.Dakshinamoorthy
Sreecharanaambujam	Sreekovil	1962	P Leela	Abhayadev	V.Dakshinamoorthy
Vedaavaakyam Naranonneyathu	Sreekovil	1962	KJ Yesudas	Abhayadev	V.Dakshinamoorthy
Manjakkuruvi Paadamo	Sreekovil	1962	Santha P Nair	Abhayadev	V.Dakshinamoorthy
Ellaarkkum Ennekkandaal	Sreekovil	1962	KJ Yesudas, P Leela	Abhayadev	V.Dakshinamoorthy
Marakkaruthe Marakkaruthe	Sreekovil	1962	KP Udayabhanu, Santha P Nair	Abhayadev	V.Dakshinamoorthy
Azhakil Mayangaathaarundu	Sreekovil	1962	Santha P Nair	Abhayadev	V.Dakshinamoorthy
Neru Parayoo Neru Parayoo	Sreekovil	1962	P Leela	Abhayadev	V.Dakshinamoorthy
Maanasaveena muzhangi	Sreekovil	1962	P Leela	Abhayadev	V.Dakshinamoorthy
Thorukille Mizhi	Sreekovil	1962	P Leela	Abhayadev	V.Dakshinamoorthy
Chundil mandahaasam	Vidhi Thanna Vilakku	1962	KJ Yesudas	P Bhaskaran	V.Dakshinamoorthy
Kannadachaalum	Vidhi Thanna Vilakku	1962	KJ Yesudas, P Leela	P Bhaskaran	V.Dakshinamoorthy
Guruvayoor Puresha	Vidhi Thanna Vilakku	1962	P Leela	Abhayadev	V.Dakshinamoorthy
Vaanin Madithattil	Vidhi Thanna Vilakku	1962	P Susheela	Abhayadev	V.Dakshinamoorthy
Kaarunya Saagarane [Guruvayupuresa]	Vidhi Thanna Vilakku	1962	P Leela, AP Komala	Abhayadev	V.Dakshinamoorthy
Chandanakkinnam	Vidhi Thanna Vilakku	1962	P Leela, PB Sreenivas	P Bhaskaran	V.Dakshinamoorthy
Kaaranamenthe Paartha	Vidhi Thanna Vilakku	1962	P Leela, Vinodini	P Bhaskaran	V.Dakshinamoorthy
Karakku Kampani	Vidhi Thanna Vilakku	1962	PB Sreenivas	P Bhaskaran	V.Dakshinamoorthy
Thuduthudunnaneyulloru	Vidhi Thanna Vilakku	1962	P Leela, Chorus	P Bhaskaran	V.Dakshinamoorthy
Kandaalum Kandaalum	Vidhi Thanna Vilakku	1962	V.Dakshinamoorthy, Santha P Nair	P Bhaskaran, Muthukulam Raghavan Pilla	V.Dakshinamoorthy
Kaathukolka Nangale	Veluthambi Dalawa	1962	P Leela	Abhayadev	V.Dakshinamoorthy
Thankachilanka Kilukki	Veluthambi Dalawa	1962	P Leela	Abhayadev	V.Dakshinamoorthy
Aakasathilirikkum	Veluthambi Dalawa	1962	Santha P Nair	Abhayadev	V.Dakshinamoorthy
Enthinnu Moham	Veluthambi Dalawa	1962	P Leela	Abhayadev	V.Dakshinamoorthy
Viralonnillenkilum	Veluthambi Dalawa	1962	AP Komala, KP Udayabhanu	Abhayadev	V.Dakshinamoorthy
Poojari Vannille	Veluthambi Dalawa	1962	P Leela, TS Kumaresh	Abhayadev	V.Dakshinamoorthy
Pushpaanjalikal	Veluthambi Dalawa	1962	KJ Yesudas	Abhayadev	V.Dakshinamoorthy
Kandu Njaan Ninmukham	Susheela	1963	S Janaki	P Bhaskaran	V.Dakshinamoorthy
Kandotte Onnu Kandotte	Susheela	1963	P Susheela	P Bhaskaran	V.Dakshinamoorthy
Yaathrakkaara Vazhiyaathrakkaara	Susheela	1963	KP Udayabhanu	Abhayadev	V.Dakshinamoorthy
Thaalolam	Susheela	1963	ML Vasanthakumari	Abhayadev	V.Dakshinamoorthy
Thaalolam [Pathos]	Susheela	1963	P Susheela	Abhayadev	V.Dakshinamoorthy
Kulirkaatte Nee	Susheela	1963	P Leela	Abhayadev	V.Dakshinamoorthy
Njanoru Kadha Parayaam	Susheela	1963	P Leela, Kamukara	Abhayadev	V.Dakshinamoorthy
Thaskaranalla Njan (Bharathastreekalthan)	Susheela	1963	PB Sreenivas, KP Udayabhanu, Prabha	Vallathol	V.Dakshinamoorthy
Priyamanasa Nee	Chilamboli	1963	P Leela	Abhayadev	V.Dakshinamoorthy
Poovinu Manamilla	Chilamboli	1963	P Leela, Kamukara	Abhayadev	V.Dakshinamoorthy
Kannane Kanden Sakhi	Chilamboli	1963	P Leela	Abhayadev	V.Dakshinamoorthy
Kalaadevathe Saraswathy	Chilamboli	1963	P Leela, Kamukara	Abhayadev	V.Dakshinamoorthy
Kettiyakaikondu	Chilamboli	1963	P Susheela	Abhayadev	V.Dakshinamoorthy
Paahi Mukunda	Chilamboli	1963	P Susheela, Kamukara	Abhayadev	V.Dakshinamoorthy
Doorennu Doorennu	Chilamboli	1963	P Leela	Abhayadev	V.Dakshinamoorthy
Deva Ninniluracheedunna	Chilamboli	1963	P Leela	Abhayadev	V.Dakshinamoorthy
Odivaava	Chilamboli	1963	Kamukara	Abhayadev	V.Dakshinamoorthy
Kasthoorithilakam	Chilamboli	1963	Kamukara	Vilwamangalam	V.Dakshinamoorthy
Maayaamayanude leela	Chilamboli	1963	Kamukara	Abhayadev	V.Dakshinamoorthy
Maadhava Madhukai	Chilamboli	1963	P Leela	Abhayadev	V.Dakshinamoorthy
Mannavanaayaalum	Sathyabhaama	1963	PB Sreenivas	Abhayadev	V.Dakshinamoorthy
Idathu Kannilakunnathenthinaano	Sathyabhaama	1963	S Janaki	Abhayadev	V.Dakshinamoorthy
Vaadaruthee Malarini	Sathyabhaama	1963	P Leela, KP Udayabhanu	Abhayadev	V.Dakshinamoorthy
Gokulathil Pandu	Sathyabhaama	1963	P Leela	Abhayadev	V.Dakshinamoorthy
Araamathin Sundariyalle	Sathyabhaama	1963	S Janaki	Abhayadev	V.Dakshinamoorthy
Kaadinte Karaluthudichu	Sathyabhaama	1963	P Leela, Chorus	Abhayadev	V.Dakshinamoorthy
Oru vazhi cholken	Sathyabhaama	1963	P Susheela	Abhayadev	V.Dakshinamoorthy
Mathi Mathi Maayaaleelakal	Sathyabhaama	1963	P Leela	Abhayadev	V.Dakshinamoorthy
Jaya Jaya Naarayana	Sathyabhaama	1963	Kamukara	Abhayadev	V.Dakshinamoorthy
Prabhaathakaale Brahmaavaayee	Sathyabhaama	1963	KJ Yesudas	Abhayadev	V.Dakshinamoorthy
Prakaasha Roopa Sooryadeva	Sathyabhaama	1963	KJ Yesudas	Abhayadev	V.Dakshinamoorthy
Maathe Jaganmaathe	Sathyabhaama	1963	P Leela	Abhayadev	V.Dakshinamoorthy
Kaakkakuyile Cholloo	Bharthaavu	1964	KJ Yesudas, LR Eeswari	P Bhaskaran	V.Dakshinamoorthy
Orikkaloru Poovalankili	Bharthaavu	1964	P Leela	P Bhaskaran	V.Dakshinamoorthy
Naagaswarathinte	Bharthaavu	1964	LR Eeswari, Chorus	P Bhaskaran	V.Dakshinamoorthy
Bhaaram Vallaatha Bhaaram	Bharthaavu	1964	KJ Yesudas	P Bhaskaran	V.Dakshinamoorthy
Kaneerozhukkuvaan Maathram	Bharthaavu	1964	Gomathy	P Bhaskaran	V.Dakshinamoorthy
Naagaraadi Ennayundu	Devaalayam	1964	V.Dakshinamoorthy	Abhayadev	V.Dakshinamoorthy
Kannilppettathu	Devaalayam	1964	PB Sreenivas	Abhayadev	V.Dakshinamoorthy
Poo Poocha Poochetti	Devaalayam	1964	Latha Raju	Abhayadev	V.Dakshinamoorthy
Maanathu Kaaru Kandu	Devaalayam	1964	P Leela	Abhayadev	V.Dakshinamoorthy
Neela Viriyitta	Devaalayam	1964	P Leela	Abhayadev	V.Dakshinamoorthy
Aaraanullil	Devaalayam	1964	P Leela	Abhayadev	V.Dakshinamoorthy
Odippokum	Devaalayam	1964	P Leela	Abhayadev	V.Dakshinamoorthy
Kaithozhaam	Devaalayam	1964	KJ Yesudas	Abhayadev	V.Dakshinamoorthy
Njaninnale	Devaalayam	1964	KJ Yesudas, P Leela	Abhayadev	V.Dakshinamoorthy
Maayaamaanava	Sree Guruvayoorappan	1964	P Leela	Abhayadev	V.Dakshinamoorthy
Radhamadhavagopala	Sree Guruvayoorappan	1964	KJ Yesudas	Abhayadev	V.Dakshinamoorthy
Janaka Kumaariyethedi	Sree Guruvayoorappan	1964	P Leela	Abhayadev	V.Dakshinamoorthy
Umma Tharam	Sree Guruvayoorappan	1964	P Leela	Abhayadev	V.Dakshinamoorthy
Kannaal Ennini [Avarnaneeyam]	Sree Guruvayoorappan	1964	P Leela	Abhayadev	V.Dakshinamoorthy
Krishna Krishna Enne	Sree Guruvayoorappan	1964	P Leela	Abhayadev	V.Dakshinamoorthy
Malayalipenne	Sree Guruvayoorappan	1964	P Leela, Renuka	Abhayadev	V.Dakshinamoorthy
Bhajare Maanasa Gopalam	Sree Guruvayoorappan	1964	V.Dakshinamoorthy	Abhayadev	V.Dakshinamoorthy
Shivathaandavam [Instrumental]	Sree Guruvayoorappan	1964			V.Dakshinamoorthy
Uthar Pathwali	Sree Guruvayoorappan	1964	V.Dakshinamoorthy	Abhayadev	V.Dakshinamoorthy
Aapath Baandhava	Sree Guruvayoorappan	1964	KJ Yesudas, Chorus		V.Dakshinamoorthy
Omkaaramaaya Porul [Santhakaaram]	Sree Guruvayoorappan	1964	V.Dakshinamoorthy		V.Dakshinamoorthy
Saandraananthaavabodham [Naaraayaneeyam]	Sree Guruvayoorappan	1964	V.Dakshinamoorthy		V.Dakshinamoorthy
Kaakkathamburaatti	Inapraavukal	1965	KJ Yesudas	Vayalar	V.Dakshinamoorthy
Karivala Karivala	Inapraavukal	1965	P Leela, PB Sreenivas	Vayalar	V.Dakshinamoorthy
Kurutholapperunnalinu	Inapraavukal	1965	KJ Yesudas, P Susheela	Vayalar	V.Dakshinamoorthy
Akkaraykkundo	Inapraavukal	1965	AM Raja	Vayalar	V.Dakshinamoorthy
Ichirippoovalan	Inapraavukal	1965	Jikki (PG Krishnaveni), Latha Raju	Vayalar	V.Dakshinamoorthy
Pathupara Vithupaadu	Inapraavukal	1965	LR Eeswari, CO Anto	Vayalar	V.Dakshinamoorthy
Virinjathenthinu	Inapraavukal	1965	P Susheela	Vayalar	V.Dakshinamoorthy
Janani Jagajanani	Kaavyamela	1965	KJ Yesudas	Vayalar	V.Dakshinamoorthy
Swararaagaroopini	Kaavyamela	1965	KJ Yesudas	Vayalar	V.Dakshinamoorthy
Devi Sreedevi (M)	Kaavyamela	1965	KJ Yesudas	Vayalar	V.Dakshinamoorthy
Naadam Shoonyathayinkal	Kaavyamela	1965	Uthaman	Vayalar	V.Dakshinamoorthy
Devi Sreedevi (F)	Kaavyamela	1965	P Leela	Vayalar	V.Dakshinamoorthy
Swapnangal Swapnangale	Kaavyamela	1965	KJ Yesudas, P Leela	Vayalar	V.Dakshinamoorthy
Theerthayaathra Ithu	Kaavyamela	1965	KJ Yesudas, P Leela	Vayalar	V.Dakshinamoorthy
Eeshwaranethedithedi	Kaavyamela	1965	Uthaman	Vayalar	V.Dakshinamoorthy
Nithyavasantham [Swararaagaroopini]	Kaavyamela	1965	KJ Yesudas	Vayalar	V.Dakshinamoorthy
Swapnangal Swapnangal	Kaavyamela	1965	KJ Yesudas, V.Dakshinamoorthy, P Leela, PB Sreenivas, MB Sreenivasan, Chorus, Gomathy	Vayalar	V.Dakshinamoorthy
Atham Pathinu	Pinchuhridayam	1966	LR Eeswari	P Bhaskaran	V.Dakshinamoorthy
Kattakkidaavaaya [Devakiyasode]	Pinchuhridayam	1966	P Leela	P Bhaskaran	V.Dakshinamoorthy
Ambaadikkuttaa	Pinchuhridayam	1966	Renuka	P Bhaskaran	V.Dakshinamoorthy
Gaanavum Layavum Neeyalle	Pinchuhridayam	1966		P Bhaskaran	V.Dakshinamoorthy
Mallaakshee ManiMoule	Pinchuhridayam	1966	P Leela, AP Komala	P Bhaskaran	V.Dakshinamoorthy
Akaleyakale Alakaapuriyil	Pinchuhridayam	1966	LR Eeswari	P Bhaskaran	V.Dakshinamoorthy
Seetha Naadakam [Kankavarum Kamini]	Pinchuhridayam	1966	Renuka, Aruna	P Bhaskaran	V.Dakshinamoorthy
Enniyaal Theeraatha	Kadamattathachan	1966	V.Dakshinamoorthy	Abhayadev	V.Dakshinamoorthy
Angangu Doore	Kadamattathachan	1966	P Leela	Anujan Kurichi	V.Dakshinamoorthy
Mulmudi Choodi	Kadamattathachan	1966	KJ Yesudas	Abhayadev	V.Dakshinamoorthy
Nin Thirunaamam	Kadamattathachan	1966	KJ Yesudas	Abhayadev	V.Dakshinamoorthy
Ellaam Thakarnallo	Kadamattathachan	1966	P Leela	Abhayadev	V.Dakshinamoorthy
Swapnashathangal	Kadamattathachan	1966	P Susheela	Abhayadev	V.Dakshinamoorthy
Aarundenikkoru	Kadamattathachan	1966	P Leela	Abhayadev	V.Dakshinamoorthy
Dushtaathmaakkalkkum	Kadamattathachan	1966	V.Dakshinamoorthy	Rt Rev Fr George Thariyan	V.Dakshinamoorthy
Kanyakaputhrante Daasanaayi	Kadamattathachan	1966	V.Dakshinamoorthy	Rt Rev Fr George Thariyan	V.Dakshinamoorthy
Pattadakkali	Kadamattathachan	1966	Chorus	Abhayadev	V.Dakshinamoorthy
Kannetha Doore	Indulekha	1967	P Leela	Pappanamkodu Lakshmanan	V.Dakshinamoorthy
Ambiliye Arikilonnu	Indulekha	1967	P Leela, Kamukara	Pappanamkodu Lakshmanan	V.Dakshinamoorthy
Manuja	Indulekha	1967	Gangadharan	Pappanamkodu Lakshmanan	V.Dakshinamoorthy
Nale Varunnu Thozhi	Indulekha	1967	P Leela	Pappanamkodu Lakshmanan	V.Dakshinamoorthy
Vazhithaara	Indulekha	1967	Gangadharan	Pappanamkodu Lakshmanan	V.Dakshinamoorthy
Poothaaliyundo	Indulekha	1967	Kamukara, Cochin Ammini	Pappanamkodu Lakshmanan	V.Dakshinamoorthy
Kanneer	Indulekha	1967	Cochin Ammini	Pappanamkodu Lakshmanan	V.Dakshinamoorthy
Salkkalaadevithan	Indulekha	1967	Kamukara, Gangadharan, Cochin Ammini	Pappanamkodu Lakshmanan	V.Dakshinamoorthy
Maanasam Thirayunnuthaare	Indulekha	1967	P Leela, Kamukara	Pappanamkodu Lakshmanan	V.Dakshinamoorthy
Varivande Nee Mayangi Veenu	Indulekha	1967	Kamukara	Pappanamkodu Lakshmanan	V.Dakshinamoorthy
Irathedi Piriyum	Cochin Express	1967	S Janaki, Chorus, Uthaman	Sreekumaran Thampi	V.Dakshinamoorthy
Kannukal Thudichappol	Cochin Express	1967	P Leela	Sreekumaran Thampi	V.Dakshinamoorthy
Ethu Raavilennnariyilla	Cochin Express	1967	P Leela	Sreekumaran Thampi	V.Dakshinamoorthy
Innunammal ramikkuka	Cochin Express	1967	V.Dakshinamoorthy, LR Eeswari	Sreekumaran Thampi	V.Dakshinamoorthy
Kadhayonnu Kettu	Cochin Express	1967	S Janaki	Sreekumaran Thampi	V.Dakshinamoorthy
Chandamulloru Penmani	Cochin Express	1967	KJ Yesudas, LR Eeswari	Sreekumaran Thampi	V.Dakshinamoorthy
Poy Varaam	Mainatharuvi Kolakkes	1967	P Susheela	Vayalar	V.Dakshinamoorthy
Pallaathuruthi	Mainatharuvi Kolakkes	1967	KJ Yesudas	Vayalar	V.Dakshinamoorthy
Appanaane Ammayaane	Mainatharuvi Kolakkes	1967	Kamukara	Vayalar	V.Dakshinamoorthy
Madhurikkum Ormakale	Lady Doctor	1967	Kamukara	P Bhaskaran	V.Dakshinamoorthy
Vidilla Njaan	Lady Doctor	1967	S Janaki, Kamukara	P Bhaskaran	V.Dakshinamoorthy
Ellaam Ellaam Thakarnallo	Lady Doctor	1967	P Leela	P Bhaskaran	V.Dakshinamoorthy
Kanninayum Kanninayum	Lady Doctor	1967	S Janaki, Kamukara	P Bhaskaran	V.Dakshinamoorthy
Manoharam	Lady Doctor	1967	LR Eeswari	P Bhaskaran	V.Dakshinamoorthy
Avideyumilla Visesham	Lady Doctor	1967	AP Komala	P Bhaskaran	V.Dakshinamoorthy
Aakaasham Bhoomiye	Bhaaryamaar Sookshikkuka	1968	KJ Yesudas	Sreekumaran Thampi	V.Dakshinamoorthy
Vaikkathashtami	Bhaaryamaar Sookshikkuka	1968	KJ Yesudas, S Janaki	Sreekumaran Thampi	V.Dakshinamoorthy
Chandrikayilaliyunnu (M)	Bhaaryamaar Sookshikkuka	1968	AM Raja	Sreekumaran Thampi	V.Dakshinamoorthy
Chandrikayilaliyunnu(D)	Bhaaryamaar Sookshikkuka	1968	KJ Yesudas, P Leela	Sreekumaran Thampi	V.Dakshinamoorthy
Marubhoomiyil Malar Viriyukayo	Bhaaryamaar Sookshikkuka	1968	P Jayachandran	Sreekumaran Thampi	V.Dakshinamoorthy
Maapputharoo	Bhaaryamaar Sookshikkuka	1968	P Leela	Sreekumaran Thampi	V.Dakshinamoorthy
Sindhubhairavi Raagarasam	Padunna Puzha	1968	P Leela, AP Komala	Sreekumaran Thampi	V.Dakshinamoorthy
Hridayasarassile	Padunna Puzha	1968	KJ Yesudas	Sreekumaran Thampi	V.Dakshinamoorthy
Paadunnu Puzha	Padunna Puzha	1968	KJ Yesudas, S Janaki, P Leela, AP Komala	Sreekumaran Thampi	V.Dakshinamoorthy
Bhoogolam Thiriyunnu	Padunna Puzha	1968	CO Anto	Sreekumaran Thampi	V.Dakshinamoorthy
Paadunnu Puzha (Bit)	Padunna Puzha	1968	S Janaki	Sreekumaran Thampi	V.Dakshinamoorthy
Pallimanikale	Adhyaapika	1968	P Leela, Chorus, Renuka	ONV Kurup	V.Dakshinamoorthy
Mannidam Pazhayoru	Adhyaapika	1968	Kamukara	ONV Kurup	V.Dakshinamoorthy
Agnikireedamaninjavale	Adhyaapika	1968	KJ Yesudas	ONV Kurup	V.Dakshinamoorthy
Manassinullile mayipeeli (Rajakumari)	Adhyaapika	1968	P Leela	ONV Kurup	V.Dakshinamoorthy
Swapnasundari	Adhyaapika	1968	KJ Yesudas	ONV Kurup	V.Dakshinamoorthy
Aathira Raavile	Adhyaapika	1968	KJ Yesudas, P Susheela	ONV Kurup	V.Dakshinamoorthy
Maavupoothu	Adhyaapika	1968	P Leela, Kalyani Menon, Renuka, Padma	ONV Kurup	V.Dakshinamoorthy
Kanya Nandana	Adhyaapika	1968	P Leela	ONV Kurup	V.Dakshinamoorthy
Nirdaya Lokam	Adhyaapika	1968	KJ Yesudas	ONV Kurup	V.Dakshinamoorthy
Utharaaswayamvaram	Danger Biscuit	1969	KJ Yesudas	Sreekumaran Thampi	V.Dakshinamoorthy
Ashwathinakshathrame	Danger Biscuit	1969	P Jayachandran	Sreekumaran Thampi	V.Dakshinamoorthy
Kannil kannil	Danger Biscuit	1969	S Janaki	Sreekumaran Thampi	V.Dakshinamoorthy
Parayaan Enikku Naanam	Danger Biscuit	1969	S Janaki	Sreekumaran Thampi	V.Dakshinamoorthy
Kaamukan Vannaal	Danger Biscuit	1969	S Janaki, Chorus	Sreekumaran Thampi	V.Dakshinamoorthy
Maananvamanamoru	Danger Biscuit	1969	P Leela	Sreekumaran Thampi	V.Dakshinamoorthy
Thamasaa Nadiyude	Danger Biscuit	1969	P Leela	Sreekumaran Thampi	V.Dakshinamoorthy
Kaamini Nin	Pooja Pushpam	1969	KJ Yesudas	Thikkurissy Sukumaran Nair	V.Dakshinamoorthy
Kodi Janmameduthaalum [Rajamallike]	Pooja Pushpam	1969	KJ Yesudas, S Janaki	Thikkurissy Sukumaran Nair	V.Dakshinamoorthy
Viralukalillaatha Vidwaante Kayyil	Pooja Pushpam	1969	KJ Yesudas	Thikkurissy Sukumaran Nair	V.Dakshinamoorthy
Kasthoorippottu Maanju	Pooja Pushpam	1969	KJ Yesudas, Renuka	Thikkurissy Sukumaran Nair	V.Dakshinamoorthy
Mohamo Daahamo	Pooja Pushpam	1969	S Janaki	Thikkurissy Sukumaran Nair	V.Dakshinamoorthy
Akkare Nikkana	Pooja Pushpam	1969	KJ Yesudas, LR Eeswari	Thikkurissy Sukumaran Nair	V.Dakshinamoorthy
Ethra Chirichaalum	Kannoor Deluxe	1969	KJ Yesudas	Sreekumaran Thampi	V.Dakshinamoorthy
Varumallo Ravil	Kannoor Deluxe	1969	S Janaki	Sreekumaran Thampi	V.Dakshinamoorthy
Kannundaayathu Ninne	Kannoor Deluxe	1969	P Leela, PB Sreenivas	Sreekumaran Thampi	V.Dakshinamoorthy
Marakkaan Kazhiyumo	Kannoor Deluxe	1969	Kamukara	Sreekumaran Thampi	V.Dakshinamoorthy
Thaippooyakkaavadiyaattam	Kannoor Deluxe	1969	KJ Yesudas	Sreekumaran Thampi	V.Dakshinamoorthy
Thulliyodum Pullimaane	Kannoor Deluxe	1969	P Jayachandran	Sreekumaran Thampi	V.Dakshinamoorthy
Ee Muhabathenthoru	Kannoor Deluxe	1969	KJ Yesudas, S Janaki, PB Sreenivas	Sreekumaran Thampi	V.Dakshinamoorthy
Maane Pedamaane	Palunku Paathram	1970	KJ Yesudas	Thikkurissy Sukumaran Nair	V.Dakshinamoorthy
Manasse Ilam Manasse	Palunku Paathram	1970	P Susheela	Thikkurissy Sukumaran Nair	V.Dakshinamoorthy
Oru Koottam Kadamkadha	Palunku Paathram	1970	P Leela	Thikkurissy Sukumaran Nair	V.Dakshinamoorthy
Kudila Kunthalakkettil	Palunku Paathram	1970	CO Anto	Thikkurissy Sukumaran Nair	V.Dakshinamoorthy
Kalyaanam Kalyaanam	Palunku Paathram	1970	S Janaki	Thikkurissy Sukumaran Nair	V.Dakshinamoorthy
Kunungi Kunungi	Palunku Paathram	1970	LR Eeswari, Chorus	Thikkurissy Sukumaran Nair	V.Dakshinamoorthy
Harisreeyennaadyamaay	Sabarimala Sree Dharmashaastha	1970	Nanu Aasan	Vayalar	V.Dakshinamoorthy
Unmaadinikal Udyaanalathakal	Sabarimala Sree Dharmashaastha	1970	P Leela	Vayalar	V.Dakshinamoorthy
Hemaambaraadambaree	Sabarimala Sree Dharmashaastha	1970	P Leela	Vayalar	V.Dakshinamoorthy
Njaattuvelakku Njan Natta	Sabarimala Sree Dharmashaastha	1970	P Susheeladevi	Vayalar	V.Dakshinamoorthy
Thripura Sundaree Naadhan	Sabarimala Sree Dharmashaastha	1970	KP Brahmanandan, Jaya Vijaya, KK Balan, M Henry, RC Suresh, S Joseph, Vaikkom Gopinath, VT Aravindakshamenon	Sreekumaran Thampi	V.Dakshinamoorthy
Ellaam Ellaam	Sabarimala Sree Dharmashaastha	1970	KP Brahmanandan, Jaya Vijaya, KK Balan, M Henry, RC Suresh, S Joseph, Vaikkom Gopinath, VT Aravindakshamenon	P Bhaskaran	V.Dakshinamoorthy
Om Namasthe Sarvashaktha	Sabarimala Sree Dharmashaastha	1970	P Jayachandran, KP Brahmanandan, Kesavan Nampoothiri	K Narayanapilla	V.Dakshinamoorthy
Madhuraapura Nayike	Sabarimala Sree Dharmashaastha	1970	P Leela	Sankaracharyar	V.Dakshinamoorthy
Shiva Rama Govinda	Sabarimala Sree Dharmashaastha	1970	KJ Yesudas	Traditional	V.Dakshinamoorthy
Lapannachyuthananda	Sabarimala Sree Dharmashaastha	1970	KJ Yesudas, P Leela, Ambili, Latha Raju, P Susheeladevi	Sankaracharyar	V.Dakshinamoorthy
Paarvanendu	Sabarimala Sree Dharmashaastha	1970	P Leela, Ambili, Latha Raju, P Susheeladevi, Leela Warrier	P Bhaskaran	V.Dakshinamoorthy
Mudaakaraatha Modakam [Ganesha Pancharatnam]	Sabarimala Sree Dharmashaastha	1970	P Jayachandran, Ambili, KP Brahmanandan, Jaya Vijaya, Latha Raju, P Susheeladevi	Sankaracharyar	V.Dakshinamoorthy
Neyyitta Vilakku	Sabarimala Sree Dharmashaastha	1970	P Susheela	K Narayanapilla	V.Dakshinamoorthy
Karagre vasathe	Sabarimala Sree Dharmashaastha	1970	Ambili	Traditional	V.Dakshinamoorthy
Sharanam Sharanam	Sabarimala Sree Dharmashaastha	1970	Jaya Vijaya	Sreekumaran Thampi	V.Dakshinamoorthy
Dhyaaye Charu Jata	Sabarimala Sree Dharmashaastha	1970	P Jayachandran	Bhoothanadha Sarvaswam	V.Dakshinamoorthy
Kalabhamazha Peyyunna	Kuttavaali	1970	P Susheela	Vayalar	V.Dakshinamoorthy
Maveli Vaanoru Kaalam	Kuttavaali	1970	P Susheela, Chorus	Vayalar	V.Dakshinamoorthy
Janichu Poyi Manushyanaayi	Kuttavaali	1970	KJ Yesudas	Vayalar	V.Dakshinamoorthy
Pambayaarin Karayilallo	Kuttavaali	1970	P Susheela	Vayalar	V.Dakshinamoorthy
Krishna Kamalanayana	Kuttavaali	1970	P Susheela	Vayalar	V.Dakshinamoorthy
Kunnathe Poomaram	Kalpana	1970	S Janaki	Vayalar	V.Dakshinamoorthy
Vajrakireedam	Kalpana	1970	S Janaki	Vayalar	V.Dakshinamoorthy
Amrithavarshini	Kalpana	1970	S Janaki, LR Eeswari	Vayalar	V.Dakshinamoorthy
Prapanchamundaaya	Kalpana	1970	P Leela	Vayalar	V.Dakshinamoorthy
Anuraagam	Kalpana	1970	KJ Yesudas	Vayalar	V.Dakshinamoorthy
Praanaveena Than	Ezhuthaatha Kadha	1970	P Jayachandran, B Vasantha	Sreekumaran Thampi	V.Dakshinamoorthy
Venkottakkudakkeezhil	Ezhuthaatha Kadha	1970	P Leela, Chorus	Sreekumaran Thampi	V.Dakshinamoorthy
Kannundenkilum	Ezhuthaatha Kadha	1970	KJ Yesudas	Sreekumaran Thampi	V.Dakshinamoorthy
Manassenna Marathaka Dweepil	Ezhuthaatha Kadha	1970	KJ Yesudas	Sreekumaran Thampi	V.Dakshinamoorthy
Ambalamanikal	Ezhuthaatha Kadha	1970	P Leela	Sreekumaran Thampi	V.Dakshinamoorthy
Udayathaarame	Ezhuthaatha Kadha	1970	B Vasantha	Sreekumaran Thampi	V.Dakshinamoorthy
Shraanthamambaram	Abhayam	1970	KJ Yesudas	G Sankara Kurup	V.Dakshinamoorthy
Paavam Maanavahridayam	Abhayam	1970	P Susheela	Sugathakumari	V.Dakshinamoorthy
Raavupoyathariyaathe	Abhayam	1970	P Susheela	P Bhaskaran	V.Dakshinamoorthy
Neeradalathaagriham	Abhayam	1970	S Janaki	G Sankara Kurup	V.Dakshinamoorthy
Maattuvin Chattangale	Abhayam	1970	MG Radhakrishnan	Kumaranasan	V.Dakshinamoorthy
Nammude Mathaavu	Abhayam	1970	Latha Raju	Vallathol	V.Dakshinamoorthy
Thaarathilum Tharuvilum	Abhayam	1970	V.Dakshinamoorthy	Sreekumaran Thampi	V.Dakshinamoorthy
Eriyum Snehaardramaam	Abhayam	1970	P Leela	G Sankara Kurup	V.Dakshinamoorthy
Ammathan Nenjil	Abhayam	1970	B Vasantha	Balamaniyamma	V.Dakshinamoorthy
Chumbanangalanumaathram	Abhayam	1970	P Jayachandran	Changampuzha	V.Dakshinamoorthy
Paarasparyashoonyamaakum	Abhayam	1970	B Vasantha	Changampuzha	V.Dakshinamoorthy
Enteyeka Dhanamangu	Abhayam	1970	B Vasantha	Sreekumaran Thampi	V.Dakshinamoorthy
Kaama Krodha Lobha	Abhayam	1970	P Jayachandran, P Leela, C Soman, CO Anto, T Soman, Varghese	Vayalar	V.Dakshinamoorthy
Manohari Nin Manoradhathil	Lottery Ticket	1970	KJ Yesudas	Sreekumaran Thampi	V.Dakshinamoorthy
Poomizhiyaal Pushpaabhishekam	Lottery Ticket	1970	KJ Yesudas	Sreekumaran Thampi	V.Dakshinamoorthy
Kumbhamaasa Nilavupole	Lottery Ticket	1970	KJ Yesudas	Sreekumaran Thampi	V.Dakshinamoorthy
Oru Roopanottukoduthal	Lottery Ticket	1970	Adoor Bhasi	Sreekumaran Thampi	V.Dakshinamoorthy
Kavya Narthaki	Lottery Ticket	1970	KJ Yesudas, P Leela, Chorus	Sreekumaran Thampi	V.Dakshinamoorthy
Oro Kanavilum	Lottery Ticket	1970	P Leela	Sreekumaran Thampi	V.Dakshinamoorthy
Innale Neeyoru	Sthree	1970	KJ Yesudas, S Janaki	P Bhaskaran	V.Dakshinamoorthy
Kavitha Paadiya Raakkuyilin	Sthree	1970	S Janaki	P Bhaskaran	V.Dakshinamoorthy
Janmam Nalki	Sthree	1970	KJ Yesudas	P Bhaskaran	V.Dakshinamoorthy
Ambala Veliyl	Sthree	1970	S Janaki	P Bhaskaran	V.Dakshinamoorthy
Kaali Bhadrakali	Marunaattil Oru Malayaali	1971	P Jayachandran, P Leela, Chorus	Sreekumaran Thampi	V.Dakshinamoorthy
Manassilunaroo	Marunaattil Oru Malayaali	1971	KJ Yesudas, S Janaki	Sreekumaran Thampi	V.Dakshinamoorthy
Asoka Poornima	Marunaattil Oru Malayaali	1971	KJ Yesudas	Sreekumaran Thampi	V.Dakshinamoorthy
Govardhana Giri	Marunaattil Oru Malayaali	1971	S Janaki	Sreekumaran Thampi	V.Dakshinamoorthy
Swargavaathil Ekaadashi	Marunaattil Oru Malayaali	1971	P Leela	Sreekumaran Thampi	V.Dakshinamoorthy
Kaattile Paazhmulam	Vilaykku Vaangiya Veena	1971	KJ Yesudas	P Bhaskaran	V.Dakshinamoorthy
Ekaantha Jeevanil	Vilaykku Vaangiya Veena	1971	KJ Yesudas	P Bhaskaran	V.Dakshinamoorthy
Kaliyum Chiriyum Maari	Vilaykku Vaangiya Veena	1971	P Jayachandran	P Bhaskaran	V.Dakshinamoorthy
Iniyurangoo	Vilaykku Vaangiya Veena	1971	S Janaki	P Bhaskaran	V.Dakshinamoorthy
Innathe Raathri	Vilaykku Vaangiya Veena	1971	B Vasantha	P Bhaskaran	V.Dakshinamoorthy
Aval Chirichal	Vilaykku Vaangiya Veena	1971	KJ Yesudas	Sreekumaran Thampi	V.Dakshinamoorthy
Sukhamevide Dukhamevide	Vilaykku Vaangiya Veena	1971	KJ Yesudas	Sreekumaran Thampi	V.Dakshinamoorthy
Izhanonthu Thakarnnoru	Vilaykku Vaangiya Veena	1971	KJ Yesudas	Sreekumaran Thampi	V.Dakshinamoorthy
Devagaayakane	Vilaykku Vaangiya Veena	1971	KP Brahmanandan	Sreekumaran Thampi	V.Dakshinamoorthy
Iniyurangoo [Pathos]	Vilaykku Vaangiya Veena	1971	S Janaki	P Bhaskaran	V.Dakshinamoorthy
Naranaayingane	Vilaykku Vaangiya Veena	1971	B Vasantha	Traditional	V.Dakshinamoorthy
Madhuram Madhumadhuram	Achante Bhaarya	1971	KJ Yesudas	Thikkurissy Sukumaran Nair	V.Dakshinamoorthy
Vaahinee Premavaahinee	Achante Bhaarya	1971	KJ Yesudas, S Janaki	Thikkurissy Sukumaran Nair	V.Dakshinamoorthy
Varumo Nee Varumo	Achante Bhaarya	1971	KJ Yesudas, S Janaki	Thikkurissy Sukumaran Nair	V.Dakshinamoorthy
Aaariraaro Thamarappoomizhi Pootti (Pathos)	Achante Bhaarya	1971	S Janaki	Thikkurissy Sukumaran Nair	V.Dakshinamoorthy
Omanathinkal Kidavo (Bit)	Achante Bhaarya	1971		Irayimman Thampi	V.Dakshinamoorthy
Harshabaashpam Thooki	Muthassi	1971	P Jayachandran	P Bhaskaran	V.Dakshinamoorthy
Mullakalinnale	Muthassi	1971	KJ Yesudas	P Bhaskaran	V.Dakshinamoorthy
Premakaumudi	Muthassi	1971	KJ Yesudas, S Janaki	P Bhaskaran	V.Dakshinamoorthy
Pambayaarin Panineer Kadavil	Muthassi	1971	S Janaki	P Bhaskaran	V.Dakshinamoorthy
Meeshakkaaran Keshavanu	Muthassi	1971	LR Anjali, Kousalya (Old), Aruna	P Bhaskaran	V.Dakshinamoorthy
Ezhu Sundara Kanyakamaar	Manushyabandhangal	1972	KJ Yesudas	P Bhaskaran	V.Dakshinamoorthy
Manushyabandhangal	Manushyabandhangal	1972	KJ Yesudas	P Bhaskaran	V.Dakshinamoorthy
Mizhiyillengilum	Manushyabandhangal	1972	P Susheela	P Bhaskaran	V.Dakshinamoorthy
Maasam Poovani Maasam	Manushyabandhangal	1972	KJ Yesudas	P Bhaskaran	V.Dakshinamoorthy
Kanakaswapnangal	Manushyabandhangal	1972	KJ Yesudas, P Susheela, P Jayachandran, LR Eeswari	P Bhaskaran	V.Dakshinamoorthy
Eeshwaran Manushyanaayavatharichu	Sree Guruvayoorappan	1972	KJ Yesudas	ONV Kurup	V.Dakshinamoorthy
Aadiyil Malsyamaay	Sree Guruvayoorappan	1972	KJ Yesudas	ONV Kurup	V.Dakshinamoorthy
Indeevaradalanayanaa	Sree Guruvayoorappan	1972	KJ Yesudas, Chorus	ONV Kurup	V.Dakshinamoorthy
Guruvayoorappante	Sree Guruvayoorappan	1972	Ambili	ONV Kurup	V.Dakshinamoorthy
Agre Pashyaami	Sree Guruvayoorappan	1972	KJ Yesudas	Melpathoor	V.Dakshinamoorthy
Peelippoomudi	Sree Guruvayoorappan	1972	P Leela, Soolamangalam Rajalakshmi	ONV Kurup	V.Dakshinamoorthy
Thiravalikkum	Sree Guruvayoorappan	1972	P Jayachandran	ONV Kurup	V.Dakshinamoorthy
Thankamakudam Choodi	Sree Guruvayoorappan	1972	V.Dakshinamoorthy, KP Brahmanandan	ONV Kurup	V.Dakshinamoorthy
Oru Varam Thedi	Sree Guruvayoorappan	1972	S Janaki	ONV Kurup	V.Dakshinamoorthy
Innaleyolam	Sree Guruvayoorappan	1972	KJ Yesudas	Poonthanam	V.Dakshinamoorthy
Ponnambala Nada	Sree Guruvayoorappan	1972	P Susheela	ONV Kurup	V.Dakshinamoorthy
Radhike [D]	Sree Guruvayoorappan	1972	P Susheela, KP Brahmanandan	ONV Kurup	V.Dakshinamoorthy
Yada Yadaahi Dharmasya	Sree Guruvayoorappan	1972	KJ Yesudas	Traditional	V.Dakshinamoorthy
Vinnil Thinkaludichappol	Sree Guruvayoorappan	1972	KJ Yesudas	ONV Kurup	V.Dakshinamoorthy
Thirumizhimunayaal	Sree Guruvayoorappan	1972	S Janaki	ONV Kurup	V.Dakshinamoorthy
Thaapangal Akattuka	Sree Guruvayoorappan	1972	P Leela	ONV Kurup	V.Dakshinamoorthy
Thankamakudam Choodi [V2]	Sree Guruvayoorappan	1972	KJ Yesudas, KP Brahmanandan	ONV Kurup	V.Dakshinamoorthy
Radhike [F]	Sree Guruvayoorappan	1972	Ambili, B Vasantha	ONV Kurup	V.Dakshinamoorthy
Karayatta Bhakthithan	Sree Guruvayoorappan	1972	KJ Yesudas	ONV Kurup	V.Dakshinamoorthy
Chithrasalabhangalaam Chithirappon	Sree Guruvayoorappan	1972	S Janaki	ONV Kurup	V.Dakshinamoorthy
Maasam Madhumaasam	Puthrakameshti	1972	S Janaki	Vayalar	V.Dakshinamoorthy
Ormakale	Puthrakameshti	1972	P Susheela	Vayalar	V.Dakshinamoorthy
Thottu Maraname	Puthrakameshti	1972	KJ Yesudas	Vayalar	V.Dakshinamoorthy
Chandrikaa Charchithamaam	Puthrakameshti	1972	KP Brahmanandan	Vayalar	V.Dakshinamoorthy
Enikku Melammo	Puthrakameshti	1972	KJ Yesudas, P Leela, Chorus, Adoor Pankajam	Vayalar	V.Dakshinamoorthy
Paaril Sneham	Naadan Premam	1972	KJ Yesudas	P Bhaskaran	V.Dakshinamoorthy
Panchaarakkunnine	Naadan Premam	1972	KJ Yesudas	P Bhaskaran	V.Dakshinamoorthy
Cheppum Panthum	Naadan Premam	1972	KJ Yesudas	P Bhaskaran	V.Dakshinamoorthy
Kanni Nilaavu	Naadan Premam	1972	P Susheela	P Bhaskaran	V.Dakshinamoorthy
Mayangaatha Ravukalil	Naadan Premam	1972	LR Eeswari	P Bhaskaran	V.Dakshinamoorthy
Undanennoru Raajaavinu	Naadan Premam	1972	P Jayachandran	P Bhaskaran	V.Dakshinamoorthy
Ponveyil	Nrithasaala	1972	KJ Yesudas	Sreekumaran Thampi	V.Dakshinamoorthy
Devavaahini	Nrithasaala	1972	KJ Yesudas	Sreekumaran Thampi	V.Dakshinamoorthy
Madanaraajan Vannu	Nrithasaala	1972	B Vasantha	Sreekumaran Thampi	V.Dakshinamoorthy
Sooryabimbam	Nrithasaala	1972	P Jayachandran	Sreekumaran Thampi	V.Dakshinamoorthy
Chirichathu Chilankayalla	Nrithasaala	1972	LR Eeswari	Sreekumaran Thampi	V.Dakshinamoorthy
Udayasooryan	Nrithasaala	1972	KP Brahmanandan	P Bhaskaran	V.Dakshinamoorthy
Manjaninja Madhumaasa	Nrithasaala	1972	S Janaki	P Bhaskaran	V.Dakshinamoorthy
Prathyusha Pushpame	Sathi	1972	KJ Yesudas, P Susheela	P Bhaskaran	V.Dakshinamoorthy
Madakara Mangala	Sathi	1972	P Susheela	P Bhaskaran	V.Dakshinamoorthy
Ulakameerezhum	Sathi	1972	P Susheela	P Bhaskaran	V.Dakshinamoorthy
Mizhiyo Mazhavilkkodiyo	Shakthi	1972	KJ Yesudas	Vayalar	V.Dakshinamoorthy
Neelaraanyame	Shakthi	1972	KJ Yesudas	Vayalar	V.Dakshinamoorthy
Pookkalenikkishtamaanu	Shakthi	1972	P Susheela	Vayalar	V.Dakshinamoorthy
Kuliro Kuliro	Shakthi	1972	S Janaki	Vayalar	V.Dakshinamoorthy
Maanyanmare Mahathikale	Shakthi	1972	Adoor Bhasi	Vayalar	V.Dakshinamoorthy
Njan Njan Njanenna	Brahmachaari	1972	KJ Yesudas	Vayalar	V.Dakshinamoorthy
Innalathe Vennilaavin	Brahmachaari	1972	KJ Yesudas	Vayalar	V.Dakshinamoorthy
Karayoo Nee Karayoo	Brahmachaari	1972	P Susheela	Vayalar	V.Dakshinamoorthy
Chithrashilaapaalikal	Brahmachaari	1972	KJ Yesudas	Vayalar	V.Dakshinamoorthy
Pathinezhu Thikayaatha	Brahmachaari	1972	KJ Yesudas	Vayalar	V.Dakshinamoorthy
Chenthengu Kulacha	Maaya	1972	KJ Yesudas	Sreekumaran Thampi	V.Dakshinamoorthy
Sandhyaykkenthinu Sindooram	Maaya	1972	P Jayachandran	Sreekumaran Thampi	V.Dakshinamoorthy
Ammathan Kanninamritham	Maaya	1972	S Janaki	Sreekumaran Thampi	V.Dakshinamoorthy
Valampiri Shankil	Maaya	1972	S Janaki	Sreekumaran Thampi	V.Dakshinamoorthy
Kaattile Poomaramaadyam	Maaya	1972	P Madhuri	Sreekumaran Thampi	V.Dakshinamoorthy
Dhanumaasathil Thiruvaathira	Maaya	1972	P Leela, Chorus	Sreekumaran Thampi	V.Dakshinamoorthy
Chundathe Punchiri	Poymukhangal	1973	KJ Yesudas	P Bhaskaran	V.Dakshinamoorthy
Aayiram Pookkal Viriyatte	Poymukhangal	1973	P Jayachandran	P Bhaskaran	V.Dakshinamoorthy
Amme Amme Ellam	Poymukhangal	1973	S Janaki	P Bhaskaran	V.Dakshinamoorthy
Manmadha Mandirathil	Poymukhangal	1973	KP Brahmanandan	P Bhaskaran	V.Dakshinamoorthy
Abhinavajeevitha	Poymukhangal	1973	S Janaki	P Bhaskaran	V.Dakshinamoorthy
Orikkal Maathram	Driksaakshi	1973	KJ Yesudas	Sreekumaran Thampi	V.Dakshinamoorthy
Chaithrayaamini	Driksaakshi	1973	KJ Yesudas	Sreekumaran Thampi	V.Dakshinamoorthy
Oru Chumbanam	Driksaakshi	1973	S Janaki	Sreekumaran Thampi	V.Dakshinamoorthy
Odakkuzhal Vili	Driksaakshi	1973	S Janaki	Sreekumaran Thampi	V.Dakshinamoorthy
Chandanathil	Shaasthram Jayichu Manushyan Thottu	1973	P Jayachandran	Sreekumaran Thampi	V.Dakshinamoorthy
Ponnin Chinga	Shaasthram Jayichu Manushyan Thottu	1973	P Leela, Chorus	Sreekumaran Thampi	V.Dakshinamoorthy
Ponnum Thenum	Shaasthram Jayichu Manushyan Thottu	1973	KJ Yesudas	Sreekumaran Thampi	V.Dakshinamoorthy
Eerezhulakum	Shaasthram Jayich Manushyan Thottu	1973	V.Dakshinamoorthy, S Janaki	Sreekumaran Thampi	V.Dakshinamoorthy
Thaarakaroopini	Shaasthram Jayichu Manushyan Thottu	1973	KP Brahmanandan	Sreekumaran Thampi	V.Dakshinamoorthy
Aaraattinaanakal	Shaasthram Jayichu Manushyan Thottu	1973	KJ Yesudas	Sreekumaran Thampi	V.Dakshinamoorthy
Gopeechandanakkuri	Football Champion	1973	KJ Yesudas	Sreekumaran Thampi	V.Dakshinamoorthy
Kaikottikali	Football Champion	1973	P Leela, Chorus	Sreekumaran Thampi	V.Dakshinamoorthy
Madhyaahna Velayil	Football Champion	1973	P Susheela	Sreekumaran Thampi	V.Dakshinamoorthy
Pathinezho Pathinetto	Football Champion	1973	S Janaki, Chorus	Sreekumaran Thampi	V.Dakshinamoorthy
Sathyadevanu Maranamundo	Football Champion	1973	KJ Yesudas, Chorus	Sreekumaran Thampi	V.Dakshinamoorthy
Naadaswarakkacheri	Football Champion	1973	Ambalappuzha Brothers		V.Dakshinamoorthy
Aarodum Mindaathe	Police Ariyaruthu	1973	S Janaki	Mankombu Gopalakrishnan	V.Dakshinamoorthy
Kaarirumbaani	Police Ariyaruthu	1973	S Janaki	Mankombu Gopalakrishnan	V.Dakshinamoorthy
Karalinte Kadalaassil	Udayam	1973	P Jayachandran	Sreekumaran Thampi	V.Dakshinamoorthy
Kalayude Devi	Udayam	1973	S Janaki, Ambili	Sreekumaran Thampi	V.Dakshinamoorthy
En Mandahaasam	Udayam	1973	KJ Yesudas	Sreekumaran Thampi	V.Dakshinamoorthy
Chaale Chaalicha	Udayam	1973	S Janaki	P Bhaskaran	V.Dakshinamoorthy
Ente Makan Krishnanunni	Udayam	1973	S Janaki	P Bhaskaran	V.Dakshinamoorthy
Kanakam Moolam Dukham	Interview	1973	KP Brahmanandan	Vayalar	V.Dakshinamoorthy
Uthara Madhuraapuriyil	Interview	1973	KJ Yesudas, P Susheela, Chorus	Vayalar	V.Dakshinamoorthy
Maala Maala Varanamaala	Interview	1973	LR Eeswari	Vayalar	V.Dakshinamoorthy
Naleekalochane	Interview	1973	KJ Yesudas	Vayalar	V.Dakshinamoorthy
Ammaykkum Achanum	Interview	1973	P Susheela	Vayalar	V.Dakshinamoorthy
Nalinamukhee	Veendum Prabhaatham	1973	KJ Yesudas	P Bhaskaran	V.Dakshinamoorthy
Oonjaala Oonjaala	Veendum Prabhaatham	1973	Ambili	P Bhaskaran	V.Dakshinamoorthy
Oonjaala	Veendum Prabhaatham	1973	KJ Yesudas, P Susheela	P Bhaskaran	V.Dakshinamoorthy
Aalolaneela Vilochanangal	Veendum Prabhaatham	1973	KJ Yesudas, S Janaki	P Bhaskaran	V.Dakshinamoorthy
Ente Veedinu	Veendum Prabhaatham	1973	ST Sasidharan	P Bhaskaran	V.Dakshinamoorthy
Kumudinikal	Veendum Prabhaatham	1973	KJ Yesudas	P Bhaskaran	V.Dakshinamoorthy
Nee Kelana	Veendum Prabhaatham	1973	KJ Yesudas	Traditional	V.Dakshinamoorthy
Chukkaala	Veendum Prabhaatham	1973	KJ Yesudas, V.Dakshinamoorthy	P Bhaskaran	V.Dakshinamoorthy
Jaya Jaya Gokulapaalaa (Bit)	Veendum Prabhaatham	1973	V.Dakshinamoorthy	Traditional	V.Dakshinamoorthy
Raadhaasamethane (Bit)	Veendum Prabhaatham	1973	KJ Yesudas	Traditional	V.Dakshinamoorthy
Kaarkoonthal Kettilenthinu	Urvasi Bhaarathi	1973	KJ Yesudas	Thikkurissy Sukumaran Nair	V.Dakshinamoorthy
Thullithulli Nadakkunna	Urvasi Bhaarathi	1973	P Jayachandran, B Vasantha	Thikkurissy Sukumaran Nair	V.Dakshinamoorthy
Nisheedhini Nisheedhini	Urvasi Bhaarathi	1973	KJ Yesudas	Thikkurissy Sukumaran Nair	V.Dakshinamoorthy
Enthu Venam	Urvasi Bhaarathi	1973	KJ Yesudas	Thikkurissy Sukumaran Nair	V.Dakshinamoorthy
Penninenthorazhaku	Urvasi Bhaarathi	1973	LR Eeswari	Thikkurissy Sukumaran Nair	V.Dakshinamoorthy
Onnichu Kalichu valarnnu	Urvasi Bhaarathi	1973	P Leela	Thikkurissy Sukumaran Nair	V.Dakshinamoorthy
Udyaanapaalaka	Urvasi Bhaarathi	1973	P Susheela	Thikkurissy Sukumaran Nair	V.Dakshinamoorthy
Mangala	Abala	1973	KJ Yesudas	SK Nair	V.Dakshinamoorthy
Srishtikarthaave	Abala	1973	Kalyani Menon	Thunchathezhuthachan	V.Dakshinamoorthy
Ennini Darsanam	Abala	1973	Kalyani Menon	Ashwathy	V.Dakshinamoorthy
Manjil Neeraadum	Abala	1973	KJ Yesudas	Sreekumaran Thampi	V.Dakshinamoorthy
Annarkkanna	Abala	1973	S Janaki	Sreekumaran Thampi	V.Dakshinamoorthy
Priyamodu Paarthanu	Abala	1973	Kalamandalam Sukumaran, Kalyani Menon	Ashwathy, Kottayathu Thamburan	V.Dakshinamoorthy, Traditional
Pathivrithayaakanam	Abala	1973	S Janaki	Kottayathu Thamburan, Puthukkad Krishnakumar	V.Dakshinamoorthy, Traditional
Kaavyapusthakamallo	Ashwathi	1974	P Jayachandran	P Bhaskaran	V.Dakshinamoorthy
Peraarin Theeratho	Ashwathi	1974	KJ Yesudas, S Janaki	P Bhaskaran	V.Dakshinamoorthy
Ente Sundaraswapna	Ashwathi	1974	KJ Yesudas	P Bhaskaran	V.Dakshinamoorthy
Chirikkoo Onnu Chirikkoo	Ashwathi	1974	P Susheela	P Bhaskaran	V.Dakshinamoorthy
Ashtamipoothinkale	Alakal	1974	KJ Yesudas	Mankombu Gopalakrishnan	V.Dakshinamoorthy
Vaassanakkulirumay	Alakal	1974	KJ Yesudas	Mankombu Gopalakrishnan	V.Dakshinamoorthy
Chandanakkuri Chaarthi	Alakal	1974	KJ Yesudas, S Janaki, Ayiroor Sadasivan	Mankombu Gopalakrishnan	V.Dakshinamoorthy
Pournami Chandrikayil	Alakal	1974	S Janaki	Mankombu Gopalakrishnan	V.Dakshinamoorthy
Premanubhoothiyumaayennil	Alakal	1974	P Leela	Mankombu Gopalakrishnan	V.Dakshinamoorthy
Madhurameenakshi	Youvanam	1974	S Janaki	Sreekumaran Thampi	V.Dakshinamoorthy
Pullaankuzhal Paattu Kelkkumbol	Youvanam	1974	KJ Yesudas	Sreekumaran Thampi	V.Dakshinamoorthy
Swarnappoonchola	Youvanam	1974	KJ Yesudas, S Janaki	Sreekumaran Thampi	V.Dakshinamoorthy
Kannaadi Vilakkumaay	Youvanam	1974	KJ Yesudas	Sreekumaran Thampi	V.Dakshinamoorthy
Daivame Deepame	Youvanam	1974	S Janaki	Sreekumaran Thampi	V.Dakshinamoorthy
Hare Raama	Youvanam	1974	Chorus	Sreekumaran Thampi	V.Dakshinamoorthy
Raagavum Thaalavum	Sapthaswarangal	1974	KJ Yesudas	Sreekumaran Thampi	V.Dakshinamoorthy
Sapthaswarangal Vidarum	Sapthaswarangal	1974	KP Brahmanandan	Sreekumaran Thampi	V.Dakshinamoorthy
Sringaara Bhaavanayo	Sapthaswarangal	1974	P Jayachandran	Sreekumaran Thampi	V.Dakshinamoorthy
Swaathithirunaalin	Sapthaswarangal	1974	P Jayachandran	Sreekumaran Thampi	V.Dakshinamoorthy
Anuraaga Narthanathin	Sapthaswarangal	1974	S Janaki	Sreekumaran Thampi	V.Dakshinamoorthy
Naadaswaram [Instrumental]	Sapthaswarangal	1974	Namagirippettai Krishnan		V.Dakshinamoorthy
Kanakasimhaasanathil	Arakkallan Mukkaalkkallan	1974	KJ Yesudas, P Jayachandran	P Bhaskaran	V.Dakshinamoorthy
Panchabaananen Cheviyil	Arakkallan Mukkaalkkallan	1974	P Susheela	P Bhaskaran	V.Dakshinamoorthy
Mullappoom Pallilo	Arakkallan Mukkaalkkallan	1974	KJ Yesudas, S Janaki	P Bhaskaran	V.Dakshinamoorthy
Pachamalappanamkuruvi	Arakkallan Mukkaalkkallan	1974	S Janaki	P Bhaskaran	V.Dakshinamoorthy
Ninte Mizhiyil	Arakkallan Mukkaalkkallan	1974	KJ Yesudas	P Bhaskaran	V.Dakshinamoorthy
Thinkalmukhi	Arakkallan Mukkaalkkallan	1974	S Janaki, Chorus	P Bhaskaran	V.Dakshinamoorthy
Kaathilla Poothilla	Arakkallan Mukkaalkkallan	1974	Chorus, Sreelatha Namboothiri	P Bhaskaran	V.Dakshinamoorthy
Naranayingane	Arakkallan Mukkaalkkallan	1974	S Janaki	P Bhaskaran	V.Dakshinamoorthy
Vinuthaasuthane	Arakkallan Mukkaalkkallan	1974	P Jayachandran, Chorus	P Bhaskaran	V.Dakshinamoorthy
Kaaman Pushpadalangal	Arakkallan Mukkaalkkallan	1974	V.Dakshinamoorthy	P Bhaskaran	V.Dakshinamoorthy
Kudakumala Kunnimala	Thacholi Marumakan Chanthu	1974	Ambili, ST Sasidharan	P Bhaskaran	V.Dakshinamoorthy
Pachamalakkiliye	Thacholi Marumakan Chanthu	1974	Chorus, Sreelatha Namboothiri	P Bhaskaran	V.Dakshinamoorthy
Kannalmizhi Kanimalare	Thacholi Marumakan Chanthu	1974	KJ Yesudas, S Janaki	P Bhaskaran	V.Dakshinamoorthy
Vrischikappoonilaave	Thacholi Marumakan Chanthu	1974	KJ Yesudas	P Bhaskaran	V.Dakshinamoorthy
Induchoodan Bhagavaante	Thacholi Marumakan Chanthu	1974	S Janaki	P Bhaskaran	V.Dakshinamoorthy
Illam Nira Vallam Nira	Thacholi Marumakan Chanthu	1974	Chorus, Kalyani Menon	P Bhaskaran	V.Dakshinamoorthy
Vadakkini Thalathile	Thacholi Marumakan Chanthu	1974	S Janaki	P Bhaskaran	V.Dakshinamoorthy
Onnaaman Kochuthumbi	Thacholi Marumakan Chanthu	1974	Ambili, Chorus, Sreelatha Namboothiri	P Bhaskaran	V.Dakshinamoorthy
Thacholi Omana Kunjichanthu	Thacholi Marumakan Chanthu	1974	P Jayachandran, Chorus		V.Dakshinamoorthy
Njanoru Paavam Morris	Bhoogolam Thiriyunnu	1974	P Jayachandran	Sreekumaran Thampi	V.Dakshinamoorthy
Kaurava Sadassil	Bhoogolam Thiriyunnu	1974	P Susheela	Sreekumaran Thampi	V.Dakshinamoorthy
Thulasi Pootha	Bhoogolam Thiriyunnu	1974	KJ Yesudas	Sreekumaran Thampi	V.Dakshinamoorthy
Ochirakkalikaanan Kondupokam	Bhoogolam Thiriyunnu	1974	KJ Yesudas	Sreekumaran Thampi	V.Dakshinamoorthy
Vilwamangalam Kandu	Night Duty	1974	S Janaki	Vayalar	V.Dakshinamoorthy
Sreemahaaganapathi	Night Duty	1974	Chorus, Jayashree, Sreelatha Namboothiri	Vayalar	V.Dakshinamoorthy
Aayiram Mukhangal	Night Duty	1974	KJ Yesudas	Vayalar	V.Dakshinamoorthy
Innu Ninte Youvanathinezhazhaku	Night Duty	1974	LR Eeswari, Ambili, Sreelatha Namboothiri	Vayalar	V.Dakshinamoorthy
Manassoru Devikshethram	Night Duty	1974	KJ Yesudas, P Susheela	Vayalar	V.Dakshinamoorthy
Anthimalarikal Poothu	Night Duty	1974	KJ Yesudas	Vayalar	V.Dakshinamoorthy
Pushpasaayaka Nin	Night Duty	1974	P Susheela	Vayalar	V.Dakshinamoorthy
Swapnangal Alankarikkum	Chumaduthaangi	1975	Jayashree	P Bhaskaran	V.Dakshinamoorthy
Ethusheethalachaaya Thalangalil	Chumaduthaangi	1975	KJ Yesudas, S Janaki	P Bhaskaran	V.Dakshinamoorthy
Maayalle	Chumaduthaangi	1975	Ambili	P Bhaskaran	V.Dakshinamoorthy
Maanathoru Kaavadiyaattam	Chumaduthaangi	1975	S Janaki	P Bhaskaran	V.Dakshinamoorthy
Swapnangal Alankarikkum (Pathos)	Chumaduthaangi	1975	Jayashree	P Bhaskaran	V.Dakshinamoorthy
Swapnangal Thakarnnu Veezhum	Chumaduthaangi	1975	V.Dakshinamoorthy	P Bhaskaran	V.Dakshinamoorthy
Muttathoru Panthal	Mattoru Seetha	1975	KJ Yesudas, P Susheela	P Bhaskaran	V.Dakshinamoorthy
Kattakkattakkayarittu	Mattoru Seetha	1975	Ambili, Chorus	P Bhaskaran	V.Dakshinamoorthy
Eechayum Poochayum	Mattoru Seetha	1975	Jayashree	P Bhaskaran	V.Dakshinamoorthy
Thattaamburathunni	Mattoru Seetha	1975	Jayashree	P Bhaskaran	V.Dakshinamoorthy
Udayathaaraka	Mattoru Seetha	1975	P Leela, Ayiroor Sadasivan, TR Omana	P Bhaskaran	V.Dakshinamoorthy
Kaamini Mouliyaam	Mattoru Seetha	1975	P Leela, Ayiroor Sadasivan, TR Omana	P Bhaskaran	V.Dakshinamoorthy
Njanuminnoru Dushyanthanaayi	Sathyathinte Nizhalil (Sathyameva Jayathe)	1975	KJ Yesudas	Sreekumaran Thampi	V.Dakshinamoorthy
Swargathilulloru	Sathyathinte Nizhalil (Sathyameva Jayathe)	1975	KJ Yesudas	Sreekumaran Thampi	V.Dakshinamoorthy
Swarnamalli Pushpavanathil	Sathyathinte Nizhalil (Sathyameva Jayathe)	1975	KJ Yesudas, Ambili	Sreekumaran Thampi	V.Dakshinamoorthy
Kaaladevathathanna Veena	Sathyathinte Nizhalil (Sathyameva Jayathe)	1975	P Susheela	Sreekumaran Thampi	V.Dakshinamoorthy
Kaattuchennu Kalebaram	Sammaanam	1975	Vani Jairam	Vayalar	V.Dakshinamoorthy
Ente Kayyil Poothiri	Sammaanam	1975	Vani Jairam	Vayalar	V.Dakshinamoorthy
Changampuzha	Sammaanam	1975	KJ Yesudas	Vayalar	V.Dakshinamoorthy
Kanninu Karuppu	Sammaanam	1975	P Jayachandran, Jayashree	Vayalar	V.Dakshinamoorthy
Karayoo Karayoo Hridayame	Sammaanam	1975	KJ Yesudas	Vayalar	V.Dakshinamoorthy
Utharagaarathil	Sexilla Stundilla	1976	Jayashree	Sreekumaran Thampi	V.Dakshinamoorthy
Yaa Ilaahi	Sexilla Stundilla	1976	S Janaki	Sreekumaran Thampi	V.Dakshinamoorthy
Avaloru Premakavitha	Sexilla Stundilla	1976	P Jayachandran	Sreekumaran Thampi	V.Dakshinamoorthy
Panchavaadyam Kottippaadum	Sexilla Stundilla	1976	Ambili, Bombay Kuruvila	Sreekumaran Thampi	V.Dakshinamoorthy
Enikkum Kuirunnu	Sexilla Stundilla	1976		Sreekumaran Thampi	V.Dakshinamoorthy
Anthappurathil	Sexilla Stundilla	1976	LR Eeswari	Sreekumaran Thampi	V.Dakshinamoorthy
Surabheemasa Vilaasam	Vazhivilakku	1976	KJ Yesudas, Jayashree	P Bhaskaran	V.Dakshinamoorthy
Samayam Chaithrasaayanthanam	Vazhivilakku	1976	Jayashree	P Bhaskaran	V.Dakshinamoorthy
Unaranuu Njanunarnnu	Vazhivilakku	1976	Vani Jairam	P Bhaskaran	V.Dakshinamoorthy
Seemantharekhayil Ninte	Vazhivilakku	1976	KJ Yesudas	P Bhaskaran	V.Dakshinamoorthy
Yuvabhaaratha	Vazhivilakku	1976	Shakeela Balakrishnan	P Bhaskaran	V.Dakshinamoorthy
Hello Madam Nair	Vazhivilakku	1976	KJ Yesudas, Pattom Sadan	P Bhaskaran	V.Dakshinamoorthy
Pulayanar Maniyamma	Prasaadam	1976	KJ Yesudas, S Janaki	P Bhaskaran	V.Dakshinamoorthy
Gaanathin Kalloliniyil	Prasaadam	1976	Vani Jairam	P Bhaskaran	V.Dakshinamoorthy
Udara Vedana [Vaatham Pitham]	Prasaadam	1976	KJ Yesudas	P Bhaskaran	V.Dakshinamoorthy
Haritha Kaanana	Prasaadam	1976	P Jayachandran, Ambili	P Bhaskaran	V.Dakshinamoorthy
En Priyamuraliyil	Neelasaari	1976	KJ Yesudas	Pappanamkodu Lakshmanan	V.Dakshinamoorthy
Priyadarsini Nin	Neelasaari	1976	S Janaki	Pappanamkodu Lakshmanan	V.Dakshinamoorthy
Kaashmeera Sandhyakale	Neelasaari	1976	KJ Yesudas	Pappanamkodu Lakshmanan	V.Dakshinamoorthy
Paarvana Sasikala	Neelasaari	1976	Ambili, Sreekanth	Pappanamkodu Lakshmanan	V.Dakshinamoorthy
Thapaswini Unaroo	Neelasaari	1976	KJ Yesudas	Pappanamkodu Lakshmanan	V.Dakshinamoorthy
Aareda Valiyavan	Neelasaari	1976	P Jayachandran	Cheri Viswanath	V.Dakshinamoorthy
Paarayidukkil Mannundo	Thulavarsham	1976	S Janaki, Selma George, Kamala	P Bhaskaran	V.Dakshinamoorthy
Maadathakkili	Thulavarsham	1976	Selma George	P Bhaskaran	V.Dakshinamoorthy
Maanikya Sreekovil [Pathos]	Priyamvada	1976	KJ Yesudas, S Janaki	Sreekumaran Thampi	V.Dakshinamoorthy
Thiruvaathira Manassil	Priyamvada	1976	P Susheela, B Vasantha	Sreekumaran Thampi	V.Dakshinamoorthy
Ariyaamo Ningalkkariyaamo	Priyamvada	1976	Sreelatha Namboothiri	Sreekumaran Thampi	V.Dakshinamoorthy
Muraleegaanathin	Priyamvada	1976	KJ Yesudas	Sreekumaran Thampi	V.Dakshinamoorthy
Manikya Sreekovil [Happy]	Priyamvada	1976	KJ Yesudas, S Janaki	Sreekumaran Thampi	V.Dakshinamoorthy
Lakshmeem [Bit]	Seethaa Swayamvaram	1976	PB Sreenivas	Traditional	V.Dakshinamoorthy, KV Mahadevan
Agnikku Nalki [Bit]	Seethaa Swayamvaram	1976	Vani Jairam	Sreekumaran Thampi	V.Dakshinamoorthy, KV Mahadevan
Vishnum = Jishnum	Seethaa Swayamvaram	1976	P Susheela, Jayashree	Traditional	V.Dakshinamoorthy, KV Mahadevan
Sreeramayana Kadha	Seethaa Swayamvaram	1976	Ambili, KP Brahmanandan, Chorus, Jayashree	Sreekumaran Thampi	V.Dakshinamoorthy, KV Mahadevan
Shudhaalakshmeer [Bit]	Seethaa Swayamvaram	1976	PB Sreenivas	Traditional	V.Dakshinamoorthy, KV Mahadevan
Om Om - Chanting [Bit]	Seethaa Swayamvaram	1976	Chorus	Traditional	V.Dakshinamoorthy, KV Mahadevan
Sarvam Raamamayam	Seethaa Swayamvaram	1976	KJ Yesudas, P Susheela, Chorus	Sreekumaran Thampi	V.Dakshinamoorthy, KV Mahadevan
Vanasanchaaram Cheyyum	Seethaa Swayamvaram	1976	PB Sreenivas, KP Brahmanandan, Jayashree	Sreekumaran Thampi	V.Dakshinamoorthy, KV Mahadevan
Mahavishnu Gaadhakal Madhurasudha Dhaarakal	Seethaa Swayamvaram	1976	Vani Jairam, KP Brahmanandan, Chorus	Sreekumaran Thampi	V.Dakshinamoorthy, KV Mahadevan
Sooryavamshajan	Seethaa Swayamvaram	1976	Vani Jairam, KP Brahmanandan	Sreekumaran Thampi	V.Dakshinamoorthy, KV Mahadevan
Kalyaanam Kaanaan Vannaalum	Seethaa Swayamvaram	1976	KJ Yesudas, P Susheela, Chorus	Sreekumaran Thampi	V.Dakshinamoorthy, KV Mahadevan
Ramachandraya Janakaraja [Bit]	Seethaa Swayamvaram	1976	P Susheela, KP Brahmanandan	Sreekumaran Thampi	V.Dakshinamoorthy, KV Mahadevan
Kannuneer Muthukal	Homakundam (Pathamudayam)	1976	Vani Jairam	Appan Thacheth	V.Dakshinamoorthy
Raasaleela Pulinamunarnnu	Homakundam (Pathamudayam)	1976	P Susheela	Appan Thacheth	V.Dakshinamoorthy
Sarigamapadhani Sapthaswarangale	Homakundam (Pathamudayam)	1976	KJ Yesudas	Appan Thacheth	V.Dakshinamoorthy
Vasundhare Janani	Homakundam (Pathamudayam)	1976	KJ Yesudas	Appan Thacheth	V.Dakshinamoorthy
Oru Pidi Pookkalum	Homakundam (Pathamudayam)	1976	Vani Jairam	Sathidevi	V.Dakshinamoorthy
Happy New Year	Muttathe Mulla	1977	Ambili	Pappanamkodu Lakshmanan	V.Dakshinamoorthy
Manam Poleyano	Muttathe Mulla	1977	KJ Yesudas	Pappanamkodu Lakshmanan	V.Dakshinamoorthy
Swapangalaadyamaay	Muttathe Mulla	1977	KJ Yesudas	Pappanamkodu Lakshmanan	V.Dakshinamoorthy
Aaromalunnikku	Muttathe Mulla	1977	P Jayachandran, Ambili, Chorus, Jayashree	Pappanamkodu Lakshmanan	V.Dakshinamoorthy
Thuruppugulaan Irakkividente	Thuruppugulaan	1977	KJ Yesudas, P Jayachandran	Sreekumaran Thampi	V.Dakshinamoorthy
Hindolaraagathin	Thuruppugulaan	1977	Vani Jairam, Latha Raju	Sreekumaran Thampi	V.Dakshinamoorthy
Govinda Naama Sankeerthanam	Thuruppugulaan	1977	P Leela, Jolly Abraham	Sreekumaran Thampi	V.Dakshinamoorthy
Udayathil Oru Roopam	Thuruppugulaan	1977	P Susheela, Jayashree	Sreekumaran Thampi	V.Dakshinamoorthy
Pambayaattile Palunkumani	Thuruppugulaan	1977	KJ Yesudas	Sreekumaran Thampi	V.Dakshinamoorthy
Ilaahi Nin Rehmath	Thuruppugulaan	1977	KP Brahmanandan, Latha Raju	Sreekumaran Thampi	V.Dakshinamoorthy
Kanmani Nin Kavilil	Thuruppugulaan	1977	KJ Yesudas, S Janaki	Sreekumaran Thampi	V.Dakshinamoorthy
Enthucheyyendu	Thuruppugulaan	1977	KJ Yesudas, S Janaki	Sreekumaran Thampi	V.Dakshinamoorthy
Kottaaramillaatha	Thuruppugulaan	1977	P Jayachandran	Sreekumaran Thampi	V.Dakshinamoorthy
Ammaykku Vendathu	Niraparayum Nilavilakkum	1977	KP Brahmanandan, Latha Raju	P Bhaskaran	V.Dakshinamoorthy
Mullappoothailamittu	Niraparayum Nilavilakkum	1977	P Jayachandran, Shakeela Balakrishnan	P Bhaskaran	V.Dakshinamoorthy
Sharanam Tharanamamme	Niraparayum Nilavilakkum	1977	Vani Jairam	Sreekumaran Thampi	V.Dakshinamoorthy
Swapnathin Varnangal	Niraparayum Nilavilakkum	1977	KP Brahmanandan, Jayashree	Sreekumaran Thampi	V.Dakshinamoorthy
Ellaam Neeye Shoure	Sreemad Bhagavadgeetha	1977	S Janaki	P Bhaskaran	V.Dakshinamoorthy
Vilaasalolupayaayi	Sreemad Bhagavadgeetha	1977	P Susheela, P Jayachandran	P Bhaskaran	V.Dakshinamoorthy
Paraa Paraa Paraa	Sreemad Bhagavadgeetha	1977	KJ Yesudas	P Bhaskaran	V.Dakshinamoorthy
Yamunaatheerathil	Sreemad Bhagavadgeetha	1977	Ambili, Jayashree	P Bhaskaran	V.Dakshinamoorthy
Madhurabhaashinikal	Sreemad Bhagavadgeetha	1977	KJ Yesudas	P Bhaskaran	V.Dakshinamoorthy
Karunaasaagara	Sreemad Bhagavadgeetha	1977	KJ Yesudas	P Bhaskaran	V.Dakshinamoorthy
Indraprasthathinnadhinaayakane	Sreemad Bhagavadgeetha	1977	P Leela, Chorus	P Bhaskaran	V.Dakshinamoorthy
Oordhwamoolamadhashaakham [Geethopadesam]	Sreemad Bhagavadgeetha	1977	P Jayachandran		V.Dakshinamoorthy
Chiriyo Chiri	Kaduvaye Pidicha Kiduva	1977	KJ Yesudas	Sreekumaran Thampi	V.Dakshinamoorthy
Oru Swapnathil	Kaduvaye Pidicha Kiduva	1977	P Susheela	Sreekumaran Thampi	V.Dakshinamoorthy
Mounamithenthe Maayaavi	Kaduvaye Pidicha Kiduva	1977	Vani Jairam	Sreekumaran Thampi	V.Dakshinamoorthy
Neelaanjanamalayilu Neeli	Kaduvaye Pidicha Kiduva	1977	KJ Yesudas	Sreekumaran Thampi	V.Dakshinamoorthy
Sreevaazhum Kovilil	Thaalappoli	1977	Vani Jairam, Chorus	Cheri Viswanath	V.Dakshinamoorthy
Purushantharangale	Thaalappoli	1977	P Susheela	Mankombu Gopalakrishnan	V.Dakshinamoorthy
Priyasakhi Poyvaroo	Thaalappoli	1977	KJ Yesudas	Cheri Viswanath	V.Dakshinamoorthy
Vrischikakkaatte	Thaalappoli	1977	KJ Yesudas	Cheri Viswanath	V.Dakshinamoorthy
Ini Njan Karayukayilla	Thaalappoli	1977	P Susheela	Cheri Viswanath	V.Dakshinamoorthy
Nithyakanyake Karthike	Makampiranna Manka	1977	KJ Yesudas, Kalyani Menon	Ettumanoor Somadasan	V.Dakshinamoorthy
Ini Njaanurangatte	Makampiranna Manka	1977	P Susheela	Ettumanoor Somadasan	V.Dakshinamoorthy
Aashrama Mangalyadeepame	Makampiranna Manka	1977	KJ Yesudas, P Susheela	Ettumanoor Somadasan	V.Dakshinamoorthy
Mallee Saayaka Lahari	Makampiranna Manka	1977	KJ Yesudas	Ettumanoor Somadasan	V.Dakshinamoorthy
Thottaal Pottunna Penne	Makampiranna Manka	1977	KJ Yesudas	Aravind Abhayadev	V.Dakshinamoorthy
Kaakkikkuppaayakkaara	Makampiranna Manka	1977	Vani Jairam	Ettumanoor Somadasan	V.Dakshinamoorthy
Sankara Digvijayam	Jagadguru Aadisankaran	1977	KJ Yesudas	P Bhaskaran	V.Dakshinamoorthy
Kumudini Priyathamanudichu	Jagadguru Aadisankaran	1977	S Janaki	P Bhaskaran	V.Dakshinamoorthy
Thripurasundari	Jagadguru Aadisankaran	1977	KJ Yesudas	P Bhaskaran	V.Dakshinamoorthy
Bhajagovindam	Jagadguru Aadisankaran	1977	KJ Yesudas	Sankaracharyar	V.Dakshinamoorthy
Aapovaahidam Sarvam	Jagadguru Aadisankaran	1977	KJ Yesudas, V.Dakshinamoorthy	P Bhaskaran	V.Dakshinamoorthy
Om Poornamada Poornamidam	Jagadguru Aadisankaran	1977	V.Dakshinamoorthy, KP Brahmanandan	Sankaracharyar	V.Dakshinamoorthy
Dadhya Dayanupavano (Kanakadharasthavam)	Jagadguru Aadisankaran	1977	P Leela	Sankaracharyar	V.Dakshinamoorthy
Gange Cha Yamune Chaiva Godavari	Jagadguru Aadisankaran	1977	P Leela	Sankaracharyar	V.Dakshinamoorthy
Paryankatham Vrajathiya (Guruvandanam)	Jagadguru Aadisankaran	1977	PB Sreenivas	Sankaracharyar	V.Dakshinamoorthy
Nabhramir Nathoyam	Jagadguru Aadisankaran	1977	PB Sreenivas	Sankaracharyar	V.Dakshinamoorthy
Dravino Da Dravina Sasmarasye (Jalakarshana Slokam)	Jagadguru Aadisankaran	1977	P Jayachandran	Sankaracharyar	V.Dakshinamoorthy
Chandrolbhasitha Sekhare (Sivasthuthi)	Jagadguru Aadisankaran	1977	P Jayachandran	Sankaracharyar	V.Dakshinamoorthy
Jaagrath Swapna Sushupthi (Chandalashtakam)	Jagadguru Aadisankaran	1977	P Jayachandran	Sankaracharyar	V.Dakshinamoorthy
Ugram Veeram Mahavishnum (Narasimhasthuthi)	Jagadguru Aadisankaran	1977	KJ Yesudas	Sankaracharyar	V.Dakshinamoorthy
Yal Bhavi Thal Bhavathi	Jagadguru Aadisankaran	1977	P Jayachandran	Sankaracharyar	V.Dakshinamoorthy
Aastham Thavadiyam (Maathruvandanam)	Jagadguru Aadisankaran	1977	KJ Yesudas	Sankaracharyar	V.Dakshinamoorthy
Anadyandyamam Param (Sivabhujangam)	Jagadguru Aadisankaran	1977	KJ Yesudas	Sankaracharyar	V.Dakshinamoorthy
Namasthe Namasthe (Vishnubhujangam)	Jagadguru Aadisankaran	1977	KJ Yesudas	Sankaracharyar	V.Dakshinamoorthy
Janmadukham Jaraadukham	Jagadguru Aadisankaran	1977	P Jayachandran	Sankaracharyar	V.Dakshinamoorthy
Cheruppakkaare Sookshikkuka	Cheruppakkar Sookshikkuka	1977	KJ Yesudas, Ambili, Chorus	Kallayam Krishnadas	V.Dakshinamoorthy
Kaamasangetham Thedivannethiya Prema	Cheruppakkar Sookshikkuka	1977	Ambili	Vayalar	V.Dakshinamoorthy
Kannaadikkavilil Kaamadevan Kurikkumee	Cheruppakkar Sookshikkuka	1977	KJ Yesudas	Vayalar	V.Dakshinamoorthy
Kshethra Manikalo	Cheruppakkar Sookshikkuka	1977	KJ Yesudas	Vayalar	V.Dakshinamoorthy
Thankathalikayil Choroottam	Cheruppakkar Sookshikkuka	1977	P Susheela	Kallayam Krishnadas	V.Dakshinamoorthy
Rambha Urvasi Menaka	Rambha Urvasi Menaka	1977	KP Brahmanandan, SP Shailaja	Madhu Alappuzha	V.Dakshinamoorthy
Veerabhageeradhan	Ninakku Njaanum Enikku Neeyum	1978	KJ Yesudas	Pappanamkodu Lakshmanan	V.Dakshinamoorthy
Dukhangal Ethuvare	Ninakku Njaanum Enikku Neeyum	1978	KJ Yesudas	Pappanamkodu Lakshmanan	V.Dakshinamoorthy
Aayiram Raathri Pularnnaalum	Ninakku Njaanum Enikku Neeyum	1978	P Jayachandran	Chirayinkeezhu Ramakrishnan Nair	V.Dakshinamoorthy
Kalladikkum Ponnaliya	Ninakku Njaanum Enikku Neeyum	1978	P Jayachandran, KP Brahmanandan	Chirayinkeezhu Ramakrishnan Nair	V.Dakshinamoorthy
Amme Amme	Premashilpi	1978	Vani Jairam	Sreekumaran Thampi	V.Dakshinamoorthy
Vannu Njan Ee Varna	Premashilpi	1978	P Jayachandran	Sreekumaran Thampi	V.Dakshinamoorthy
Thulliyaadum Vaarmudiyil	Premashilpi	1978	KJ Yesudas	Sreekumaran Thampi	V.Dakshinamoorthy
Kathirmandapathil	Premashilpi	1978	Vani Jairam	Sreekumaran Thampi	V.Dakshinamoorthy
Vayal Varambil	Kalpavriksham	1978	KJ Yesudas	Sreekumaran Thampi	V.Dakshinamoorthy
Aadu Paambe	Kalpavriksham	1978	P Jayachandran, Ambili, CO Anto	Sreekumaran Thampi	V.Dakshinamoorthy
Pulariyil Namme	Kalpavriksham	1978	Ambili, Chorus	Chirayinkeezhu Ramakrishnan Nair	V.Dakshinamoorthy
Kalyaanasougandhikappoo	Kalpavriksham	1978	KJ Yesudas	Chirayinkeezhu Ramakrishnan Nair	V.Dakshinamoorthy
Kocheelazhimugham	Kalpavriksham	1978	Ambili, Chorus, Jayashree	Chirayinkeezhu Ramakrishnan Nair	V.Dakshinamoorthy
Kaattadichaal Kaliyilakum	Ashtamudikkaayal	1978	KJ Yesudas	Sreekumaran Thampi	V.Dakshinamoorthy
Cherthalayil	Ashtamudikkaayal	1978	KJ Yesudas	Sreekumaran Thampi	V.Dakshinamoorthy
Chirikkunnatheppol	Ashtamudikkaayal	1978	P Jayachandran	Sreekumaran Thampi	V.Dakshinamoorthy
Kayyil Thottaalum	Ashtamudikkaayal	1978	P Jayachandran	Sreekumaran Thampi	V.Dakshinamoorthy
Medamaasakkuliril	Ashtamudikkaayal	1978	Sherin Peters	Chirayinkeezhu Ramakrishnan Nair	V.Dakshinamoorthy
Ananthamaam Chakravaalam	Kanalkattakal	1978	KJ Yesudas	Chirayinkeezhu Ramakrishnan Nair, Pappanamkodu Lakshmanan	V.Dakshinamoorthy
Induvadane	Kanalkattakal	1978	KJ Yesudas	Chirayinkeezhu Ramakrishnan Nair, Pappanamkodu Lakshmanan	V.Dakshinamoorthy
Aanandavalli Aayiravalli	Kanalkattakal	1978	V.Dakshinamoorthy, Ambili	Chirayinkeezhu Ramakrishnan Nair, Pappanamkodu Lakshmanan	V.Dakshinamoorthy
Elamani	Kanalkattakal	1978	P Susheela	P Bhaskaran	V.Dakshinamoorthy
Manmadha Kadhayude	Kanalkattakal	1978	KJ Yesudas	P Bhaskaran	V.Dakshinamoorthy
Chirakaala Kaamitha	Manoradham	1978	Vani Jairam	P Bhaskaran	V.Dakshinamoorthy
Madhura Swarga	Manoradham	1978	KJ Yesudas, Vani Jairam	P Bhaskaran	V.Dakshinamoorthy
Maanasa Souvarna	Manoradham	1978	KJ Yesudas	P Bhaskaran	V.Dakshinamoorthy
Kazhinja Kaalathin	Manoradham	1978	KJ Yesudas, Ambili	P Bhaskaran	V.Dakshinamoorthy
Maalakkaavadi	Ashokavanam	1978	KJ Yesudas	Sreekumaran Thampi	V.Dakshinamoorthy
Madhyavenal Raathri	Ashokavanam	1978	P Jayachandran	Sreekumaran Thampi	V.Dakshinamoorthy
Premathin Lahariyil	Ashokavanam	1978	S Janaki, Ambili	Vellanad Narayanan	V.Dakshinamoorthy
Sukhamenna Poovuthedi	Ashokavanam	1978	P Jayachandran, Ambili, CO Anto	Vellanad Narayanan	V.Dakshinamoorthy
Aadi Jeevakanam	Praarthana	1978	KJ Yesudas	Mankombu Gopalakrishnan	V.Dakshinamoorthy
Aashamsakal	Praarthana	1978	P Susheela	Mankombu Gopalakrishnan	V.Dakshinamoorthy
Chaarumukhi Ninnenokki	Praarthana	1978	KJ Yesudas	Mankombu Gopalakrishnan	V.Dakshinamoorthy
Ente Manoradhathile	Praarthana	1978	KJ Yesudas	Mankombu Gopalakrishnan	V.Dakshinamoorthy
Ettumaanoorambalathin	Kudumbam Namukku Sreekovil	1978	P Jayachandran, Ambili	Mankombu Gopalakrishnan	V.Dakshinamoorthy
Innolam Kaanatha	Kudumbam Namukku Sreekovil	1978	KJ Yesudas, Kalyani Menon	Mankombu Gopalakrishnan	V.Dakshinamoorthy
Omkaarapporulinte	Kudumbam Namukku Sreekovil	1978	KJ Yesudas	Mankombu Gopalakrishnan	V.Dakshinamoorthy
Daivam Bhoomiyil	Kudumbam Namukku Sreekovil	1978	KJ Yesudas, P Jayachandran	Mankombu Gopalakrishnan	V.Dakshinamoorthy
Sathyathin Kaavalkkaaran	Jimmy	1979	Kalyani Menon	Sreekumaran Thampi	V.Dakshinamoorthy
Njaayaraazhchakal	Jimmy	1979	KJ Yesudas, Ambili	Sreekumaran Thampi	V.Dakshinamoorthy
Chirikkumpol née	Jimmy	1979	KJ Yesudas	Sreekumaran Thampi	V.Dakshinamoorthy
Aadiyushassil	Manushyan	1979	KJ Yesudas	Bharanikkavu Sivakumar	V.Dakshinamoorthy
Aakashame	Manushyan	1979	KJ Yesudas	ONV Kurup	V.Dakshinamoorthy
Etho Sandhyayil	Manushyan	1979	KJ Yesudas	ONV Kurup	V.Dakshinamoorthy
Hamsapadangalil	Manushyan	1979	Vani Jairam	Bharanikkavu Sivakumar	V.Dakshinamoorthy
Oru Pularithudukathir	Manushyan	1979		ONV Kurup	V.Dakshinamoorthy
Kathirmandapam [M]	Kathirmandapam	1979	KJ Yesudas	Sreekumaran Thampi	V.Dakshinamoorthy
Kathirmandapam [F]	Kathirmandapam	1979	P Susheela	Sreekumaran Thampi	V.Dakshinamoorthy
Chembakamalla née	Kathirmandapam	1979	P Jayachandran	Sreekumaran Thampi	V.Dakshinamoorthy
Athappookkalam	Kathirmandapam	1979	Ambili, Sherin Peters	Sreekumaran Thampi	V.Dakshinamoorthy
Ee Gaanathil	Kathirmandapam	1979	KJ Yesudas, Vani Jairam	Sreekumaran Thampi	V.Dakshinamoorthy
Eeshwara Jagadeeshwara	Kannukal	1979	KJ Yesudas	Ravi Vilangan	V.Dakshinamoorthy
Vaathalayeshante	Kannukal	1979	KJ Yesudas	Ravi Vilangan	V.Dakshinamoorthy
Jyothirmayi	Kannukal	1979	S Janaki	Ravi Vilangan	V.Dakshinamoorthy
Swapname Ninakku Nanni	Aval Ente Swapnam	1979	P Jayachandran	Sasi Peroorkada	V.Dakshinamoorthy
Poonilaavu Punchirichu	Aval Ente Swapnam	1979	P Jayachandran, Kalyani Menon	Sasi Peroorkada	V.Dakshinamoorthy
Raasa Narthanam	Aval Ente Swapnam	1979	P Jayachandran	Sasi Peroorkada	V.Dakshinamoorthy
Madanolsavam	Aval Ente Swapnam	1979	P Jayachandran	Sasi Peroorkada	V.Dakshinamoorthy
Pakal Swapnathin	Ambalavilakku	1980	KJ Yesudas, Vani Jairam	Sreekumaran Thampi	V.Dakshinamoorthy
Manjappattu Njorinju	Ambalavilakku	1980	Vani Jairam	Sreekumaran Thampi	V.Dakshinamoorthy
Varumo Veendum Thrikkaarthikakal	Ambalavilakku	1980	KJ Yesudas	Sreekumaran Thampi	V.Dakshinamoorthy
Aananda Nadanam	Bhaktha Hanumaan	1980	P Susheela, Vani Jairam	Sreekumaran Thampi	V.Dakshinamoorthy
Sandhyaa Vihagam	Bhaktha Hanumaan	1980	Vani Jairam	Sreekumaran Thampi	V.Dakshinamoorthy
Rama Rama Rama	Bhaktha Hanumaan	1980	KJ Yesudas	Sreekumaran Thampi	V.Dakshinamoorthy
Varshappoomukil	Bhaktha Hanumaan	1980	Chorus, Kalyani Menon	Sreekumaran Thampi	V.Dakshinamoorthy
Ilavangappoovukal	Bhaktha Hanumaan	1980	KJ Yesudas, Ambili	Sreekumaran Thampi	V.Dakshinamoorthy
Charithra Naayaka	Bhaktha Hanumaan	1980	P Susheela	Sreekumaran Thampi	V.Dakshinamoorthy
Jagalpraana Nandana	Bhaktha Hanumaan	1980	KJ Yesudas	Sreekumaran Thampi	V.Dakshinamoorthy
Raamajayam Sreeramajayam	Bhaktha Hanumaan	1980	KJ Yesudas, Chorus	Sreekumaran Thampi	V.Dakshinamoorthy
Naagendra Haaraaya [Slokam]	Bhaktha Hanumaan	1980	KJ Yesudas		V.Dakshinamoorthy
Guruvum Pithaavum (Bit)	Bhaktha Hanumaan	1980	KJ Yesudas	Sreekumaran Thampi	V.Dakshinamoorthy
Suprabhaatham	Sree Oozhpaazhachi Daivadar	1980	KJ Yesudas	Keethari Narayanan Nambiar	V.Dakshinamoorthy
Sougandhikangale Vidaruvin	Pathiraasooryan	1981	KJ Yesudas, P Jayachandran	Sreekumaran Thampi	V.Dakshinamoorthy
Ilam Manjin	Pathiraasooryan	1981	Vani Jairam	Sreekumaran Thampi	V.Dakshinamoorthy
Paathiraasooryan Udichu	Pathiraasooryan	1981	KJ Yesudas	Sreekumaran Thampi	V.Dakshinamoorthy
Jeevithame Ha Jeevithame	Pathiraasooryan	1981	KJ Yesudas	Sreekumaran Thampi	V.Dakshinamoorthy
Idavazhiyil	Pathiraasooryan	1981	KJ Yesudas, Ambili	Sreekumaran Thampi	V.Dakshinamoorthy
Annante Hridayamallo	Ellam Ninakku Vendi	1981	KJ Yesudas, Vani Jairam	Sreekumaran Thampi	V.Dakshinamoorthy
Kandappol	Ellam Ninakku Vendi	1981	KJ Yesudas, CO Anto	PA Sayyed	V.Dakshinamoorthy
Kamukane	Ellam Ninakku Vendi	1981			V.Dakshinamoorthy
Paavunangi Kalamorungi	Arikkaari Ammu	1981	P Jayachandran, Vani Jairam, Chorus	Sreekumaran Thampi	V.Dakshinamoorthy
Panchaayathu Vilakkananju	Arikkaari Ammu	1981	KJ Yesudas	Sreekumaran Thampi	V.Dakshinamoorthy
Etho Etho Poonkaavanathil	Arikkaari Ammu	1981	KJ Yesudas, Usha Ravi	Sreekumaran Thampi	V.Dakshinamoorthy
Valliyakkante Varikka Plavil	Arikkaari Ammu	1981	CO Anto, Usha Ravi	Sreekumaran Thampi	V.Dakshinamoorthy
Venmukil Peeli Choodi Thennalil	Sambhavam	1981	KJ Yesudas	Sathyan Anthikkad	V.Dakshinamoorthy
Pakalo Paathiravo	Sambhavam	1981	KJ Yesudas, V.Dakshinamoorthy	Sathyan Anthikkad	V.Dakshinamoorthy
Vayalinnoru Kalyanam	Sambhavam	1981	KJ Yesudas, S Janaki, Chorus	Sathyan Anthikkad	V.Dakshinamoorthy
Sindoorathilakamaninju Vaanam	Sambhavam	1981	KJ Yesudas	Sathyan Anthikkad	V.Dakshinamoorthy
Moovanthipparambiloode	Aambalppoovu	1981	KJ Yesudas	Kavalam Narayana Panicker	V.Dakshinamoorthy
Maanthen Mizhikalil	Aambalppoovu	1981	Usha Ravi	Kavalam Narayana Panicker	V.Dakshinamoorthy
Poochakkurinji	Aambalppoovu	1981	Vani Jairam	Kavalam Narayana Panicker	V.Dakshinamoorthy
Naadhim Naadhim	Aambalppoovu	1981	Ambili	Kavalam Narayana Panicker	V.Dakshinamoorthy
Nananja Neriya Patturumaal	Ente Mohangal Poovaninju	1982	KJ Yesudas, S Janaki	Bichu Thirumala	V.Dakshinamoorthy
Thamburu Thaane Shruthi Meetti	Ente Mohangal Poovaninju	1982	S Janaki	Bichu Thirumala	V.Dakshinamoorthy
Oro Pulariyum	Ente Mohangal Poovaninju	1982	KJ Yesudas	Bichu Thirumala	V.Dakshinamoorthy
Aashaada Meghangal	Ente Mohangal Poovaninju	1982	KJ Yesudas, S Janaki	Puthiyankam Murali	V.Dakshinamoorthy
Love Two	Ente Mohangal Poovaninju	1982	Vikram, Anita Chandrasekhar	Puthiyankam Murali	V.Dakshinamoorthy
Chakkini Raaja [Bit]	Ente Mohangal Poovaninju	1982	S Janaki, M Balamuralikrishna		V.Dakshinamoorthy
Instrumental [violin]	Ente Mohangal Poovaninju	1982			V.Dakshinamoorthy
Raghuvara	Ente Mohangal Poovaninju	1982	KJ Yesudas, S Janaki, M Balamuralikrishna		V.Dakshinamoorthy
Tha Thai Thakita Thaka	Ente Mohangal Poovaninju	1982	KJ Yesudas		V.Dakshinamoorthy
Manasuloni	Ente Mohangal Poovaninju	1982	KJ Yesudas, S Janaki		V.Dakshinamoorthy
Ksheera Saagara	Ente Mohangal Poovaninju	1982	KJ Yesudas	Muringoor Sankara Potti	V.Dakshinamoorthy, traditional
Aalaapanam	Gaanam	1982	KJ Yesudas, S Janaki	Sreekumaran Thampi	V.Dakshinamoorthy
Sindooraaruna Vigrahaam	Gaanam	1982	S Janaki		V.Dakshinamoorthy
Maanasa	Gaanam	1982	S Janaki		V.Dakshinamoorthy
Aarodu Cholvene	Gaanam	1982	KJ Yesudas, Vani Jairam	Sreekumaran Thampi	V.Dakshinamoorthy
Sarvardhu Ramaneeya	Gaanam	1982	Kalamandalam Sukumaran, Kalanilayam Unnikrishnan	Unnai Warrier	V.Dakshinamoorthy
Karuna Cheyvaanenthu Thaamasam	Gaanam	1982	Vani Jairam	Irayimman Thampi	V.Dakshinamoorthy
Aliveni Enthu Cheyvu	Gaanam	1982	P Susheela	Swathi Thirunal	V.Dakshinamoorthy
Guruleka [Entharo Mahanubhavulu]	Gaanam	1982	M Balamuralikrishna	Thyagaraja	V.Dakshinamoorthy
Adri Suthaavara	Gaanam	1982	KJ Yesudas, P Susheela, M Balamuralikrishna	Swathi Thirunal	V.Dakshinamoorthy
Yaa Ramitha	Gaanam	1982	M Balamuralikrishna	Jayadevar	V.Dakshinamoorthy
Sree Mahaaganapathim	Gaanam	1982	M Balamuralikrishna	Muthuswamy Dikshithar	V.Dakshinamoorthy
Aalaapanam [M]	Gaanam	1982	KJ Yesudas	Sreekumaran Thampi	V.Dakshinamoorthy
Vilichal Kelkkaathe	Priyasakhi Raadha	1982	KJ Yesudas	Sreekumaran Thampi	V.Dakshinamoorthy
Sindooram Pooshi	Priyasakhi Raadha	1982	Vani Jairam	Sreekumaran Thampi	V.Dakshinamoorthy
Akale Ninnu Njan	Priyasakhi Raadha	1982	KJ Yesudas	Sreekumaran Thampi	V.Dakshinamoorthy
Chiriyude Kavitha	Priyasakhi Raadha	1982	P Susheela	Sreekumaran Thampi	V.Dakshinamoorthy
Anjanavarnnanaamunni	Guruvayoor Maahathmyam	1984	Kalyani Menon	P Bhaskaran	V.Dakshinamoorthy
Gurupavanapuranilaya	Guruvayoor Maahathmyam	1984	MG Radhakrishnan, Chorus	P Bhaskaran	V.Dakshinamoorthy
Kannane Kanninal Kandu	Guruvayoor Maahathmyam	1984	KJ Yesudas	P Bhaskaran	V.Dakshinamoorthy
Kisalaya Sayana	Guruvayoor Maahathmyam	1984	Kavalam Sreekumar		V.Dakshinamoorthy
Krishna Krishna Mukunda	Guruvayoor Maahathmyam	1984	V.Dakshinamoorthy, MG Radhakrishnan, Chorus		V.Dakshinamoorthy
Phulla Paadala Paadalee	Guruvayoor Maahathmyam	1984	KJ Yesudas	traditional	V.Dakshinamoorthy
Ennunnikkanna	Krishna Guruvaayoorappa	1984	Ambili	Koorkkancheri Sugathan	V.Dakshinamoorthy
Naarayana Krishna	Krishna Guruvaayoorappa	1984	Kalyani Menon	Koorkkancheri Sugathan	V.Dakshinamoorthy
Kanna Kaarmukilolivarnna [Ninthirunadayil]	Krishna Guruvaayoorappa	1984	Kalyani Menon	Koorkkancheri Sugathan	V.Dakshinamoorthy
Anjana Sreedhara	Krishna Guruvaayoorappa	1984	P Susheela		V.Dakshinamoorthy
Krishna (Bhooloka Vaikuntavaasa)	Krishna Guruvaayoorappa	1984	KJ Yesudas		V.Dakshinamoorthy
Yogeendraanaam	Krishna Guruvaayoorappa	1984	KJ Yesudas		V.Dakshinamoorthy
Mookane Gaayakanaakkunna	Krishna Guruvaayoorappa	1984	KJ Yesudas	Koorkkancheri Sugathan	V.Dakshinamoorthy
Raajaputhri [Slokam]	Krishna Guruvaayoorappa	1984	KJ Yesudas		V.Dakshinamoorthy
Thrikkaal Randum	Krishna Guruvaayoorappa	1984	KJ Yesudas	Koorkkancheri Sugathan	V.Dakshinamoorthy
Krishna Krishna Mukunda	Krishna Guruvaayoorappa	1984	KJ Yesudas		V.Dakshinamoorthy
Minnum Ponnin Kireedam	Krishna Guruvaayoorappa	1984	P Susheela		V.Dakshinamoorthy
Karaaravinda [Bit]	Krishna Guruvaayoorappa	1984	P Jayachandran		V.Dakshinamoorthy
Jaya Jagadeesa [Bit]	Krishna Guruvaayoorappa	1984			V.Dakshinamoorthy
Kasthoori Thilakam [Bit]	Krishna Guruvaayoorappa	1984	KJ Yesudas		V.Dakshinamoorthy
Sankadaapahaa [Bit]	Krishna Guruvaayoorappa	1984	Kalyani Menon		V.Dakshinamoorthy
Saandraananda	Krishna Guruvaayoorappa	1984	KJ Yesudas		V.Dakshinamoorthy
Archana Cheytheedaam	Naavadakku Paniyedukku	1985	KJ Yesudas	Mavelikkara Devamma	V.Dakshinamoorthy
Saaradhi Njangade	Naavadakku Paniyedukku	1985	Chorus, CO Anto	Mavelikkara Devamma	V.Dakshinamoorthy
Kaithozhaam	Naavadakku Paniyedukku	1985	Ambili	Mavelikkara Devamma	V.Dakshinamoorthy
Oru Veena Than	Kaaveri	1986	M Balamuralikrishna, Eeswari Panicker	Kavalam Narayana Panicker	V.Dakshinamoorthy, Ilayaraja
Janmangal	Kaaveri	1986	M Balamuralikrishna, Eeswari Panicker	Kavalam Narayana Panicker	V.Dakshinamoorthy, Ilayaraja
Neelalohitha	Kaaveri	1986	M Balamuralikrishna	Kavalam Narayana Panicker	V.Dakshinamoorthy, Ilayaraja
Swarnasandhya	Kaaveri	1986	M Balamuralikrishna	Kavalam Narayana Panicker	V.Dakshinamoorthy, Ilayaraja
Heramba	Kaaveri	1986	V.Dakshinamoorthy, Chorus, Eeswari Panicker	Kavalam Narayana Panicker	V.Dakshinamoorthy, Ilayaraja
Vaathilppazuthilooden	Idanaazhiyil Oru Kaalocha	1987	KJ Yesudas, KS Chithra	ONV Kurup	V.Dakshinamoorthy
Karaagre Vasathe	Idanaazhiyil Oru Kaalocha	1987	Vijay Yesudas	traditional	V.Dakshinamoorthy
Thedithedi Ananju	Idanaazhiyil Oru Kaalocha	1987	KJ Yesudas	ONV Kurup	V.Dakshinamoorthy
Aavanippoovani	Idanaazhiyil Oru Kaalocha	1987	KJ Yesudas, KS Chithra	ONV Kurup	V.Dakshinamoorthy
Devante Chevadiyanayukilo	Idanaazhiyil Oru Kaalocha	1987	KJ Yesudas	ONV Kurup	V.Dakshinamoorthy
Idarunna Kilimozhiyode	Veendumoru Geetham	1991	KS Chithra	Hari Kudappanakkunnu	V.Dakshinamoorthy
Gandharva Hridayam	Veendumoru Geetham	1991	KJ Yesudas	Hari Kudappanakkunnu	V.Dakshinamoorthy
Sangeetha Thapasya	Veendumoru Geetham	1991	KJ Yesudas	Hari Kudappanakkunnu	V.Dakshinamoorthy
Polkani Vaikkuvatharo	Veendumoru Geetham	1991	KJ Yesudas, KS Chithra	Hari Kudappanakkunnu	V.Dakshinamoorthy
Smarahara Gowreeshavibho [Sooryam Sundaraloka]	Veendumoru Geetham	1991	KJ Yesudas	V.Dakshinamoorthy	V.Dakshinamoorthy
Idarunna Kilimozhiyode [M]	Veendumoru Geetham	1991	KJ Yesudas	Hari Kudappanakkunnu	V.Dakshinamoorthy
Amme Neeyoru	Mizhikal Sakshi	2008	KJ Yesudas	ONV Kurup	V.Dakshinamoorthy
Chethiyum Chemparuthiyum	Mizhikal Sakshi	2008	KS Chithra	ONV Kurup	V.Dakshinamoorthy
Thaazhampoothottilil	Mizhikal Sakshi	2008	S Janaki	ONV Kurup	V.Dakshinamoorthy
Manjutharasree	Mizhikal Sakshi	2008	Aparna Rajeev	ONV Kurup	V.Dakshinamoorthy
Ennineedarshanam	Ambalam	0	P Leela	Sreekumaran Thampi	V.Dakshinamoorthy
Viravodu Paarthanu	Ambalam	0	Jayashree	Sreekumaran Thampi	V.Dakshinamoorthy
Manjilneeradum	Ambalam	0	KJ Yesudas	Sreekumaran Thampi	V.Dakshinamoorthy
Annaarakkanna	Ambalam	0	S Janaki	Sreekumaran Thampi	V.Dakshinamoorthy
Hasthinapuriyude	Karnan	0	P Susheela	Bichu Thirumala	V.Dakshinamoorthy
Madhava Radha Madhava	Karnan	0	KJ Yesudas, Chorus	Panicker Varappuzha	V.Dakshinamoorthy
Surapadhamo	Karnan	0	Vani Jairam, Ambili	Panicker Varappuzha	V.Dakshinamoorthy
Hiranmayena Paathrena..Kodi Kodi	Karnan	0	KJ Yesudas	Bichu Thirumala	V.Dakshinamoorthy
Kathunna Venaliloode	Vasanthathinte Kanal Vazhikalil	2014	Anuradha Sriram, RK Ramadas, G Sreeram	Anil V Nagendran	V.Dakshinamoorthy
Parayaatha Vaakkoru	Shyamaragam	2020	K. J. Yesudas, K. S. Chithra	Rafeeq Ahamed	V.Dakshinamoorthy
Aadi Njan Kadamba Vanikayil	Shyamaragam	2020	K. J. Yesudas	Rafeeq Ahamed	V.Dakshinamoorthy
Guruvinodo	Shyamaragam	2020	K. J. Yesudas	Kaithapram Damodaran	V.Dakshinamoorthy
Thumburu Narada	Shyamaragam	2020	K. J. Yesudas	Kaithapram Damodaran	V.Dakshinamoorthy
Izha Poya Thamburu	Shyamaragam	2020	K. J. Yesudas	Rafeeq Ahamed	V.Dakshinamoorthy
Manjunarthana Shalayil	Shyamaragam	2020	K. S. Chithra, Vijay Yesudas	Rafeeq Ahamed	V.Dakshinamoorthy
Rama Ravikula Soma	Shyamaragam	2020	K. J. Yesudas, Ammeya Vijay Yesudas	V. Dakshinamoorthy	V.Dakshinamoorthy
