= Nandha En Nila =

- Poster
- Directed by: A. Jagannathan
- Written by: Pushpa Thangadurai
- Based on: Nandha En Nila by Pushpa Thangadurai
- Produced by: R. S. Sankaran
- Starring: Vijayakumar; Sumithra; Fatafat Jayalaxmi
- Cinematography: Dutt
- Edited by: Vijayanand
- Music by: V. Dakshinamoorthy
- Production company: Ramya Cine Arts
- Release date: 9 December 1977
- Country: India
- Language: Tamil

Nandha En Nila (transl. Nandha, my moon) is a 1977 Indian Tamil-language film directed by A. Jagannathan and written by Pushpa Thangadurai. It is based on Thangadurai's novel of the same name that was serialised in Dinamani Kathir. The film stars Vijayakumar, Sumithra and Fatafat Jayalaxmi. It was released on 9 December 1977.

== Cast ==
- Vijayakumar
- Sumithra
- Fatafat Jayalaxmi
- M. N. Rajam (guest appearance)
- Kusalakumari (guest appearance)
- Jeyageetha
- Anupama
- Vasantha
- Selvakumar
- Veerasamy
- Ramachandran
- Rangamani

== Soundtrack ==
The music was composed by V. Dakshinamoorthy. The title song is set to the Hindustani raga Madhuvanti. It attained popularity, as did "Oru Kaathal Saamrajyam".

Track listing
No.	Title	Lyrics	Singer(s)	Length
1.	"Nandha En Nila"	Iraa. Pazhanisami	S. P. Balasubrahmanyam
2.	"Kovilukku Poojaiseiya"	Iraa. Pazhanisami	P. Susheela
3.	"Oru Kaathal Saamrajyam"	Na. Kamarasan	P. Jayachandran, T. K. Kala
4.	"Kannukutti Chellamma"	Pulamaipithan	S. Janaki
