= Appusami =

Series of Tamil novels and short stories

Appusami (Tamil: அப்புசாமி) stories are a series of Tamil novels and short stories written by Bhagyam Ramasamy. The first story was published in Kumudam magazine in 1963. The stories have been in print for over four decades and many of them have been made into stage plays and Television shows. A Humour club in Chennai has been named as the "Appusami-Seethapatti Humour Trust" after the protagonists of the series.

== Bagyam Ramasami ==
Bagyam Ramasami (Tamil: பாக்யம் ராமசாமி, also spelled as Bakkiyam Ramasamy) is the pseudonym of Ja. Ra. Sundaresan (1 September 1930 to 8 December 2017). He was born in Jalakandapuram, Salem district. His pen name is a combination of his mother's name (Bhagyam) and his father's (Ramasamy). His first breakthrough was the publication of the story Appusami and the African Beauty in Kumudam in 1963. Since then he has published a number of serialized novels, stage plays and short stories featuring the same set of characters. Some of the stories were published under various pen names including Yogesh, Vanamali, Selvamani, Mrinalini, Sivathanal, and Jwalamalini. He also worked as a journalist in Kumudam, eventually retiring in 1990 as its joint editor.

== Books ==
About 30 novels and novellas of Appusami have been published so far. Most of them were serialised in Kumudam and then published in book form. They are all illustrated by painter Jeyaraj.

- Appusami and the African Beauty
- 1001 Appusamiy Iravugal
- Manavar Thalaivar Appusami
- Appusamiyum Arupudha vilakkum
- Pamara Geethai
- Sundakkai Sithar Appusami
- Appusami Padam Edukkirar
- Berovin pinnal
- August Thyagi Appusami
- Seethapattiyin Sabadham
- Veerappan kattil appusamy
- Akasavaniyil Appusamy
- Appusami Divorce Ketkirar
- Come on Appusamy Come on
- Human bomb Appusamy
- Appusamiyin Colour TV
- Appusamiyum Hypnotisa poonayum
- Appusamiyum Azhagi pottiyum
- Appusamiyin Thali bakkiyam
- Appusamiyum Bharathi Narkaliyum
