= Jeyaraj =

Thomas Jeyaraj Fernando, aka Jeyaraj, Jayaraj, or simply, J., is an illustrator for Tamil periodicals and magazines. He is especially known for his depictions of attractive, young (and frequently buxom) women, which have earned him a fan following among readers of Tamil magazines as well as criticism.

Jeyaraj, who is from Tuticorin, has no formal training in art, but nevertheless won prizes in school and college for his sketches. He studied for a bachelor's degree in economics, but when he could not find any employment in his chosen field, he decided to try his luck with illustration. This was in Chennai in the late 1950s. His first assignment in 1958 was for a short story by Ra. Ki. Rangarajan in Kumudam magazine, fetched him Rs. 10.

Since then, Jeyaraj has illustrated thousands of Tamil short stories, jokes and serials, and is known for his versatility, handling everything from line-drawing, wash drawing, colour drawing, perspective drawing to cartoons. He is also very quick and prolific as an illustrator: according to Jeyaraj, in the 1970s, he used to make 40 illustrations a day. A biographical note in The Blaft Anthology of Tamil Pulp Fiction, Vol. II claims that by 1980, Jeyaraj had done over 2,00,000 illustrations. The same note lists his personal favourites from his vast body of work: the sketches for KJ, a science-fiction novel by Sujatha and My Name is Kamala by Pushpa Thangadurai. Other notable work includes Appusami and Seethapaatti (see entry on Appusami for a list of titles illustrated by Jeyaraj).

Jeyaraj continues to illustrate for twelve magazines, including a Telugu and a Kannada magazine, besides illustrating textbooks. He has been awarded the Devan Memorial Medal in 2007.

== Bibliography ==
- Highway 117, a comic written by Pushpa Thangadurai, illustrated by Jeyaraj. In The Blaft Anthology of Tamil Pulp Fiction, Vol. II (2010).
