= Oru Oodhappu Kan Simittugiradhu =

1976 film by S. P. Muthuraman

- Theatrical release poster
- Directed by: S. P. Muthuraman
- Based on: Oru Oodhappu Kan Simittugiradhu by Pushpa Thangadurai
- Produced by: S. Sankaran
- Starring: Kamal Haasan; Sujatha
- Cinematography: Babu
- Edited by: R.Vittal
- Music by: V. Dakshinamoorthy
- Production company: Ramya Cine Arts
- Release date: 4 June 1976
- Running time: 117 minutes
- Country: India
- Language: Tamil

Oru Oodhappu Kan Simittugiradhu (transl. A purple flower blinks) is a 1976 Indian Tamil-language film directed by S. P. Muthuraman. The film stars Kamal Haasan and Sujatha. It is based on the novel of the same name written by Pushpa Thangadurai. The film was released on 4 June 1976. Muthuraman won the Filmfare Award for Best Director – Tamil, and Haasan won for Best Actor – Tamil.

== Plot ==
Ravi lives next door to Radha and both fall in love with each other. Ravi's friend challenges him that he can make Radha fall for him in one week. Unable to prove himself right, the friend attempts to molest Radha. Ravi arrives at the scene and a fight ensues with Ravi killing his friend unintentionally. Ravi is sentenced to life sentence and he requests Radha to forget him and carry on with her life.

Due to Gandhi's birthday, Ravi gets a pardon after spending six years in prison. Film begins with Ravi travelling back to his hometown. Ravi happens to meet Radha who in turn spurns him and asks him not to interfere with her life! Apparently Radha is already married to Sundaram!

Unable to forget her, Ravi lives a lonely and monotonous life. Radha enters hs workplace and pleads with him to forget her and start his life anew. Ravi says that it is impossible unless Radha spends one whole day with him like as if they were married! "Don't mistake me," he pleads, "I will not even touch you." He explains that he had built a lot of dreams on living together and this "one day" business will satisfy his "hunger.”

Now Radha is overcome with emotions and is unable to forget Ravi!!! She now requests that there is only one solution.........!

Radha requests Ravi to come over to her house and pick her up that very night. Together they will run away and live together Ravi turns up Radha writes a long letter for her husband and then leaves the house. What happens then forms the story.

== Cast ==
- Kamal Haasan as Ravi
- Sujatha as Radha
- Vijayakumar as Sundaram
- Vijayalakshmi as Swapna
- Vijayageetha as Meena
- Thilak
- A. K. Veerasami as Ravi's father
- Desigan as train passenger

== Production ==
Oru Oodhappu Kan Simittugiradhu is based on the novel of the same name by Pushpa Thangadurai that was serialised in Dinamani Kathir. It was the debut film of producer S. Sankaran; he is credited for the dialogues. Babu was the cinematographer of this film. The song "Aandavan Illa Ulagamithu" was shot on the Backwater near Pondicherry and also at Majestic Studios. Muthuraman kept the film's ending entirely different from the novel to which Thangadurai agreed. Muthuraman felt this ending was done keeping the box-office success and cultural traditions in mind.

== Soundtrack ==
The soundtrack was composed by V. Dakshinamoorthy, while the lyrics for the songs were written by Kannadasan, Kumaradevan and R. Palani Samy. The song "Nalla Manam" is set in the Carnatic raga known as Kalyanavasantam.

| Title | Singer(s) | Length |
|---|---|---|
| "Murukko Kai Murukku" | T. K. Kala | 4:00 |
| "Aandavan Illaa Ulagamethu" | Vani Jairam, T. M. Soundararajan | 4:21 |
| "Nalla Manam Vaazhga" | K. J. Yesudas | 4:03 |

== Release and reception ==
Oru Oodhappu Kan Simittugiradhu was released on 4 June 1976. Kanthan of Kalki in his review praised the performances of star cast and Muthuraman's direction and concluded saying innovation of the film is not limited to the title. Naagai Dharuman of Navamani praised the acting, dialogues, music and direction. At the Filmfare Awards South, Muthuraman won in the Best Director – Tamil category, and Haasan in Best Actor – Tamil.
