= Pushpa Thangadurai =

Indian author (1931-2013)

Sri Venugopal (1931 – 10 November 2013) was an Indian author of religious pilgrimage travelogues, who also wrote fiction under the name Pushpa Thangadurai.

== Works ==
Some of his most famous novels are:

- En Peyar Kamala (1974–75)
- Oru Sivappu Villaku Erikirathu (1976)
- Oru Oodhappu Kan Simittugiradhu (1976)

Oru Oodhappu Kan Simittugiradhu was made into a film starring Kamal Haasan.

An excerpt of En Peyar Kamala was translated into English by Pritham K. Chakravarthy and published as part of The Blaft Anthology of Tamil Pulp Fiction in 2008. Volume 2 of The Blaft Anthology of Tamil Pulp Fiction featured Highway 17, a 1980 comic written by Pushpa Thangadurai and illustrated by Jeyaraj, starring a motorcycle-riding female detective called Karate Kavitha.

Some of Pushpa Thangadurai's other short stories and novels are:

- Neen Naan Nila,
- Thenmerku Paruvam,
- Naan Raamanalla,
- Thiruvarangan Ula
