= C. V. Rajendran =

Indian film director and producer

- Born: Chithamur Vijayaraghavulu Rajendran; 12 March 1937; Chithamur, Chengalpattu, Madras Presidency, British India
- Died: 1 April 2018 (aged 81); Chennai, Tamil Nadu, India
- Occupations: Director; Producer
- Years active: 1967–1989
- Relatives: C. V. Sridhar elder brother

C. V. Rajendran (12 March 1937 – 1 April 2018) was an Indian film director and producer who worked in the Tamil, Telugu, Malayalam, Kannada and Hindi film industries. He was a younger brother of famous director C. V. Sridhar.

== Film career ==
He worked with C. V. Sridhar as assistant and associate director and gained experience and the knowledge of successful filmmaking and started his own career. He introduced Sivaji Ganesan's son Prabhu as an actor through the film Sangili.

== Death ==
Rajendran died on April 1, 2018, at the age of 81 due to health issues at MIOT Hospital.

== Filmography ==
=== As director ===
Films

Year	Film	Language	Notes
1967	Anubavam Pudhumai	Tamil	
1968	Galatta Kalyanam	Tamil	
1969	Nil Gavani Kadhali	Tamil	
1970	Veettuku Veedu	Tamil	Based on the play Right Bed Wrong Husband; Remade as Galate Samsara
1971	Pudhiya Vazhkai	Tamil	
1971	Sumathi En Sundari	Tamil	
1972	Nawab Naarkali	Tamil	Adapted from stage play of same name written by Komal Swaminathan
1972	Raja	Tamil	Remake of Johny Mera Naam
1972	Needhi	Tamil	Remake of Dushman
1973	Nyayam Ketkirom	Tamil	
1973	Ponnoonjal	Tamil	
1973	Manidharil Manikkam	Tamil	
1974	En Magan	Tamil	Remake of Be-Imaan
1974	Sivagamiyin Selvan	Tamil	Remake of Aradhana
1974	Vani Rani	Tamil	Remake of Seeta Aur Geeta
1975	Thrimurthy	Kannada	Debut in Kannada as a director Debut of Parvathamma Rajkumar as producer
1975	Dulhan	Hindi	Debut in Hindi as a director Remake of Sharada
1975	Maalai Sooda Vaa	Tamil	
1976	Unakkaga Naan	Tamil	Remake of Namak Haraam
1977	Galate Samsara	Kannada	Remake of Veettuku Veedu
1977	Deepa	Kannada	
1977	Kittu Puttu	Kannada	Remake of Anubavi Raja Anubavi
1978	Vazhthungal	Tamil	25th Film
1978	Singaporenalli Raja Kulla	Kannada	
1979	Preethi Madu Thamashe Nodu	Kannada	Remake of Kadhalikka Neramillai
1979	Adalu Badalu	Kannada	
1979	Aliya Devaru	Kannada	Remake of Galatta Kalyanam
1979	Kamala	Kannada	
1980	Ullasa Paravaigal	Tamil	
1980	Usha Swayamvara	Kannada	
1981	Garjanai	Tamil	
1981	Garjane	Kannada	
1981	Garjanam	Malayalam	
1982	Thyagi	Tamil	Remake of Kannada film Antha
1982	Sangili	Tamil	Remake of Kalicharan
1982	Lottery Ticket	Tamil	
1982	Prema Matsara	Kannada	Remake of Uchakattam; Debut of Kannada actor V. Ravichandran as producer
1982	Puthiya Swargam	Tamil	
1983	Desanikokkadu	Telugu	
1983	Sandhippu	Tamil	Remake of Naseeb
1984	Naane Raja	Kannada	
1984	Vaazhkai	Tamil	Remake of Avtaar
1984	Raja Veetu Kannukutti	Tamil	
1984	Sahachariyam	Malayalam	
1984	Ungal Veetu Pillai	Tamil	
1985	Hum Nahin Jhukenge	Hindi	
1985	Unakkaga Oru Roja	Tamil	
1985	Perumai	Tamil	
1985	Puthiya Theerppu	Tamil	
1985	Chiranjeevi	Telugu	Remake of Naane Raja
1986	Poi Mugangal	Tamil	
1986	Raja Nee Vaazhga	Tamil	
1987	Poorna Chandra	Kannada	Remake of Aarilirunthu Arubathu Varai
1987	Anand	Tamil	Remake of Majnu
1989	Chinnappadass	Tamil	50th Film

Serials

- Kurinji Malar (DD Podhigai)
- Kokila Enge Pogiraal (Sun TV)
- Naalavathu Mudichu - Jaya TV

=== As producer ===
Year	Film	Language	Notes
1997	Once More	Tamil	
1994	Vietnam Colony	Tamil	Remake of Vietnam Colony
