= Aasai Manaivi =

- Theatrical release poster
- Directed by: K. Sornam
- Screenplay by: K. Sornam
- Story by: Ravindar
- Produced by: Mayuram Soundar
- Starring: Jaishankar; Sujatha
- Music by: Shankar–Ganesh
- Production company: Surialaya Productions
- Release date: 27 August 1977
- Running time: 144 minutes
- Country: India
- Language: Tamil

Aasai Manaivi (transl. Dearest wife) is a 1977 Indian Tamil-language comedy film directed by K. Sornam, and produced by Mayuram Soundar. The film stars Jaishankar and Sujatha. It was released on 27 August 1977.

== Plot ==
Kanan is a milk vendor living in a village. To teach a lesson to the village headman's arrogant daughter, he marries her upon becoming a movie star. Kanan takes various steps to tame his shrew wife, ultimately succeeding, and the couple amicably resolve their differences.

== Cast ==
Male cast

- Jaishankar
- Jayachandran
- Thengai Srinivasan

Female cast

- Sujatha
- Bhavani
- Manorama

== Production ==
Aasai Manaivi was directed by K. Sornam, who also wrote the screenplay based on a story by Ravindar. The film was produced by Mayuram Soundar under the production company Surialaya Productions. The final length of the film was 3,920.10 metres (12,861.2 ft).

== Soundtrack ==
The soundtrack was composed by the duo Shankar–Ganesh, while the lyrics were written by Kannadasan, Vaali and A. Maruthakasi.

Track listing
No.	Title	Singer(s)	Length
1.	"Azhagana Meni"	S. P. Balasubrahmanyam
2.	"Meenakshi Koil"	T. M. Soundararajan, P. Susheela
3.	"Maappillai Varaar"	T. M. Soundararajan
4.	"Varalamo"	S. Janaki

== Critical reception ==
Naagai Dharuman of Anna praised the acting of cast, music, Sornam's direction but found Thengai Srinivasan and Manorama's humour dissatisfying.
