= Aattukara Alamelu =

1977 film by R. Thyagarajan

- Poster
- Directed by: R. Thyagarajan
- Screenplay by: Sandow M. M. A. Chinnappa Thevar
- Produced by: Sandow M. M. A. Chinnappa Thevar
- Starring: Sivakumar; Sripriya
- Music by: Shankar–Ganesh
- Production company: Dhandayudhapani Films
- Release date: 10 November 1977
- Country: India
- Language: Tamil

Aattukara Alamelu (transl. Goatherd Alamelu) is a 1977 Indian Tamil-language film directed by R. Thyagarajan and produced by Sandow M. M. A. Chinnappa Thevar. The film stars Sivakumar and Sripriya. It was released on 10 November 1977 and became a silver jubilee hit. The film was remade in Telugu as Pottelu Punnamma and in Hindi as Mera Rakshak.

== Plot ==
Goatherd Alamelu leads a happy life with her pet goat in a village. Her life changes for the worse when a landlord talks ill of her character and claims to have had an affair with her.

== Cast ==
- Sivakumar as Vijay
- Sripriya as Alamelu
- Jai Ganesh as Balu
- Suruli Rajan as Velu
- S. A. Ashokan as Dharmalingam
- Kavitha as Radha
- Major Sundarrajan as Aarumugam
- Thengai Srinivasan as "Nattu Vaithiyar" Nallamuthu
- Nagesh as Varadhachary
- Jayamalini

== Production ==
Sivakumar said it took him "15 years to do the role in [Aattukara Alamelu]". The name of the title character, Alamelu, is a reference to Sripriya's birth name. Chinnappa Thevar wanted Nagesh to direct the film; he refused as he felt he was not the right person to do so.

== Soundtrack ==
The music for this film was composed by Shankar–Ganesh, and the lyrics were written by Ma. Ra.

Song	Singers	Length
"Aathula Meen"	P. Susheela	03:44
"Dhaagam Theerndhadi"	P. Susheela, T. M. Soundararajan	03:58
"Paruththi Edukkaiyile"	P. Susheela, T. M. Soundararajan	04:25
"Then Koodu Thirumagal"	P. Susheela	04:04

== Release and reception ==
Aattukara Alamelu was released on 10 November 1977, Diwali day. Film World wrote, "Aattukara Alamelu is a fluke; one misses any worthy element that is a box-office draw besides the performance of the goat!". The film was a silver jubilee hit.

== Legacy ==
Enga Ooru Aattukkaran (1990), which also stars Sripriya, was compared by journalists to Aattukara Alamelu as it also prominently features a goat.
