= Thyagi =

1982 film by C. V. Rajendran

- Theatrical release poster
- Directed by: C. V. Rajendran
- Written by: Aaroor Dass (dialogues)
- Story by: H. K. Anantha Rao
- Produced by: G. Hanumantharao
- Starring: Sivaji Ganesan; Sujatha; Major Sundarrajan; V. S. Raghavan
- Cinematography: P. Gopala Krishnan
- Edited by: K. Gopala Rao
- Music by: M. S. Viswanathan
- Production company: Padmalaya Pictures
- Release date: 3 September 1982
- Country: India
- Language: Tamil

Thyagi (/θjɑːɡɪ/ transl. Martyr) is a 1982 Indian Tamil-language action film, directed by C. V. Rajendran and produced by G. Hanumantharao. The film stars Sivaji Ganesan, Sujatha, Major Sundarrajan and V. S. Raghavan. It is a remake of the 1981 Kannada film Antha. The film was released on 3 September 1982.

== Plot ==
IG Ganesh takes up the place of his doppelganger criminal and don, Kanwarlal to infiltrate their gang, collect evidence and bring them to book.

In the course of his work as Kanwarlal, he has to see the tortured death of his pregnant wife, and his sister being raped and murdered. He is forced to ignore the death of his mother too. He bears through all this in the interest of seeing his mission through due to his patriotic nature. He gets caught eventually by the gang and is tortured brutally. He endures all the sacrifices and brings them to court only for them to get acquitted by extra-judicial means.

Seeing all his sacrifices go to waste, he loses his control and kills all involved with his own hands and stands as the culprit in the eyes of the law.

== Cast ==
- Sivaji Ganesan as IG Ganesh/Kanwarlal
- Sujatha as Kamala
- Sripriya as Rajani
- Geetha
- Major Sundarrajan
- V. S. Raghavan
- Vijayakumar as Baig
- Tiger Prabhakar as Prathap
- Pandari Bai
- Major Sundarrajan
- Y. G. Parthasarathy
- Oru Viral Krishna Rao

== Soundtrack ==
Soundtrack was composed by M. S. Viswanathan.

Track listing
No.	Title	Lyrics	Singer(s)	Length
1.	"Thottil Kattum"	Kannadasan	T. M. Soundararajan, P. Susheela	4:25
2.	"Mullai Poovena"	Kannadasan	P. Susheela, S. P. Balasubrahmanyam	4:24
3.	"Vandhaley Maadhu"	Kannadasan	S. Janaki	4:17
4.	"Yennai Yaar"	Vaali	S. Janaki	4:11
5.	"Aadungadi"	Vaali	T. M. Soundararajan	5:18
Total length:				22:35

== Controversy ==
Thyagi was initially denied a censor certificate by the censor board. One of the members claimed that the makers of the film retained the scenes which were deleted in the original Kannada film.

== Reception ==
Thiraignani of Kalki found the plot similar to Sangili which also starred Ganesan and directed by Rajendran but the director has shown variation in dealing the subject and praised Ganesan's acting in dual roles and concluded that it is obvious that the censor board has troubled the film more than cruel people torturing Ganesan in the film.
