= Naane Varuven =

Naane Varuven may refer to:

- Naane Varuven (1992 film)
- Naane Varuven (2022 film)
