= Krish J. Sathaar =

Indian actor and entrepreneur

Krish J. Sathar
- Born: Unni Krishnan Sathar
- Occupations: Actor; Entrepreneur
- Years active: 2013–2016
- Spouse: Sonali Nabeel (m. 2020)
- Parents: Sathaar; Jayabharathi

Krish J. Sathar (born Unni Krishnan Sathar; 14 September 1984) is a former Indian actor, who worked in Malayalam, Tamil, and Telugu films.

== Career ==
Krish was born to actors Sathaar and Jayabharathi. Being born into a film family, he received several acting offers. He chose the Mohanlal starrer Ladies and Gentleman directed by the very successful film maker Siddique as his launchpad. He was pursuing a course at the New York Film Academy before entering the film industry. In 2014, he made his Tamil film debuts with Malini 22 Palayamkottai directed by Sripriya and a remakes of Aashiq Abu's 22 Female Kottayam. His next film was To Noora with Love in which he portrays the lead character Shahjahan, a happy-go-lucky guy and sufi singer. He had agreed to be part of the film Thakkali but later opted out due to date issues. In 2016, he made his Telugu debut with Ghatana, the Telugu remake of 22 Female Kottayam which was simultaneously shot alongside Malini 22 Palayamkottai.

== Personal life ==
In 2020, Krish married Sonali Nabeel, daughter of Nabeel Sarooshi and Kamleshwari, in a Hindu wedding ceremony held in Chennai. Krish resides with his family in London, England.

== Filmography ==
Year	Film	Role	Language	Notes
2013	Ladies and Gentleman	Sharath	Malayalam	
2014	Malini 22 Palayamkottai	Varun	Tamil	
2014	To Noora with Love	Shahjahan	Malayalam	
2016	Ghatana	Varun	Telugu	

== Awards and nominations ==
Awards (for Ladies and Gentleman)

- 2013 - Asiavision Awards - Best Debut Actor - Won
- 2014 - Jaycee Foundation Awards - Best Debut Actor - Won
- 2014 - SIIMA Awards - Best Debut Actor - Won

Nominations (for To Noora with Love)

- Asiavision Awards - Best Actor - Nominated
- SIIMA awards - Best Actor - Nominated
- Asianet Film Awards - Best Actor - Nominated
