= Neeya? =

1979 film directed by Durai

- Theatrical release poster
- Directed by: Durai
- Screenplay by: P. Kalaimani
- Story by: Rajendra Singh Aatish
- Produced by: Girija Pakkirisami; K. S. Narasimhan
- Starring: See Cast
- Cinematography: V. Ranga
- Edited by: M. Vellaisamy
- Music by: Shankar–Ganesh
- Production company: Sri Chamundeswari Films
- Release date: 13 January 1979
- Running time: 137 minutes
- Country: India
- Language: Tamil

Neeya? (transl. Is that You?) is a 1979 Indian Tamil-language horror thriller film, directed by Durai and written by P. Kalaimani. A remake of the 1976 Hindi film Nagin, it has an ensemble cast that includes Kamal Haasan, Jai Ganesh, Vijayakumar, Ravichandran, Srikanth, M. N. Nambiar, Sripriya, Manjula, Deepa, Latha and Chandra Mohan. The film revolves around an Ichchadhari naag who seeks to kill six people she holds responsible for the death of her lover.

Neeya was released on 13 January 1979, the week of Pongal. The film was a commercial success, running for over 100 days in theatres. It was followed by two spiritual successors: Naane Varuven (1992) and Neeya 2 (2019).

== Plot ==
Naga Rani is an Ichchadhari naag – an elusive snake which can assume human form. She is in love with another Ichchadhari naag named Naga Raja. One day Naga Raja is attacked by a vulture and he is saved by Kamal, a researcher who shoots the vulture. Naga Raja thanks him for saving his life then he asks what is he doing here. Kamal replies that he is searching for Ichchadhari naags. Naga Raja then turns himself into one in front of Kamal and goes to Naga Rani. Kamal realises that he found the elusive snakes and inform his friends Vijay, Sri, Jai, Ravi and Salim, but they do not believe him. Kamal then takes them to the place where he met Naga Raja and they secretly sees the lovers in their human forms.

When Naga Raja turns back into a Cobra, he is shot dead by Salim, who thought the Cobra was going to attack Naga Rani. Naga Rani sees in Naga Raja's eyes the images of the killers, and decides to take revenge on the group of friends she holds responsible for her lover's death. Naga Rani systematically kills Salim, Ravi, Jai, Sri and Vijay. She attempts to kill Kamal too but fails, and is mortally wounded in another attempt. Near death, Naga Rani realises that she was wrong and that her revenge destroyed many lives just like her own life was destroyed. She sees Naga Raja in the sky calling out to her, and reunites with him in the afterlife.

== Cast ==
- Kamal Haasan as Kamal
- Sripriya as Naga Rani
- Jai Ganesh as Jai
- Vijayakumar as Vijay
- Ravichandran as Ravi
- Srikanth as Sri
- Sudheer as Saleem
- M. N. Nambiar as Appu Kuttan
- Manjula as Usha
- Deepa as Deepa
- Latha as Latha
- Chandra Mohan as Naga Raja
- Y. G. Mahendran as Martin

== Production ==
Sripriya saw the Hindi film Nagin (1976) with her mother and liked one of the film's songs, wishing for a potential film featuring her and a song set to the same tune. A week later, her mother bought the rights to remake Nagin in Tamil; the remake was titled Neeya?. Durai was approached to direct; though busy, he ultimately agreed. The male lead role was first offered to Rajinikanth, who could not accept due to scheduling conflicts; the role later went to Kamal Haasan.

== Soundtrack ==
Music was composed by Shankar–Ganesh.

Title	Lyrics	Singer(s)	Length
"Ore Jeevan"	Kannadasan	Vani Jairam, S. P. Balasubrahmanyam	4:45
"Naan Kattil Mele"	Vaali	S. P. Balasubrahmanyam, P. Susheela	4:26
"Unnai Ethanai"	Pulamaipithan	S. P. Balasubrahmanyam, P. Susheela	4:47
"Oru Kodi"	Alangudi Somu	S. P. Balasubrahmanyam, S. Janaki	4:56
"Ore Jeevan" (Pathos)	Kannadasan	Vani Jairam	---

== Release and reception ==
Neeya? was released on 13 January 1979, the week of Pongal. On 28 January 1979 Ananda Vikatan rated the film 50 out of 100, appreciating it for putting together an ensemble cast and for showing the snake in a limited manner, yet creating the right impact. Naagai Dharuman of Anna praised the acting, music, cinematography, dialogues and direction. The film was a commercial success, running for over 100 days in theatres.

== Legacy ==
Neeya? attained cult status in Tamil cinema, and became a landmark for being a rare multistarrer in the same industry. It was followed by two spiritual successors: Naane Varuven (1992) and Neeya 2 (2019).

== Bibliography ==
- Dhananjayan, G. (2011). The Best of Tamil Cinema, 1931 to 2010: 1977–2010. Galatta Media. OCLC 733724281.
