= Raja (1972 film) =

- Poster
- Directed by: C. V. Rajendran
- Screenplay by: A. L. Narayanan; Sujatha Story Dept.
- Story by: K. A. Narayanan
- Produced by: K. Balaji
- Starring: Sivaji Ganesan; Jayalalithaa
- Cinematography: Masthan–Thara
- Edited by: B. Kanthasamy
- Music by: M. S. Viswanathan
- Production company: Sujatha Cine Arts
- Release date: 26 January 1972
- Country: India
- Language: Tamil

Raja is a 1972 Indian Tamil-language spy action film directed by C. V. Rajendran. The film stars Sivaji Ganesan, Jayalalithaa and K. Balaji. It is a remake of the 1970 Hindi film Johny Mera Naam. The film was released on 26 January 1972, and became successful at the box office.

== Cast ==
- Sivaji Ganesan as Raja/Sekar
- Jayalalithaa as Radha
- K. Balaji as Chandran/Babu
- Major Sundarrajan as Prasanth
- S. V. Ranga Rao as Nagalingam Boopathy
- V. S. Raghavan as Dharmalingam Boopathy
- R. S. Manohar as Viswam
- Pandari Bai as Parvathi
- Gandhimathi as Radha Mother's
- J. P. Chandrababu as Pattabiraman/Seetharaman/Janakiraman
- V. Nagayya as Haridass
- K. Kannan as Jambu
- Harikrishnan as Head of Police officer
- Master Sekhar as Young Raja
- Gemini Balu as Gang Sumglar
- I.S.R as Club Manager

== Production ==
Raja is a remake of the 1970 Hindi film Johny Mera Naam. A. C. Tirulokchandar was initially chosen to direct the film but he left for personal reasons. Sivaji Ganesan later recommended C. V. Rajendran as director.

== Soundtrack ==
The music was composed by M. S. Viswanathan, with lyrics by Kannadasan.

Song	Singers	Length
"Kalayana Ponnu"	T. M. Soundararajan	04.23
"Gangaiyile"	Susheela	04.07
"Irandil Ondru"	S. P. Balasubrahmanyam, B. Vasantha	04.16
"Naan Uyirukku Tharuvatu"	L. R. Eswari	05.15
"Nee Vara Vendum"	T. M. Soundararajan, Susheela	04.26

== Re-release ==
A digitally restored version of the film was released in May 2018.
