= Sripriya =

Indian actress (born 1959)

- Born: Alamelu Mangai; 5 March 1956 (age 70); Chennai, Tamil Nadu, India
- Years active: 1974–1992; 2007–2014
- Political party: Makkal Needhi Maiam
- Spouse: Rajkumar Sethupathi (m. 1988)
- Children: 2

Sripriya is an Indian former actress, film director and politician. She has acted in over 300 films in Tamil, Telugu, Kannada, Malayalam and Hindi languages.

She has also directed films in Tamil, Kannada and Telugu languages, including the 2014 film Drushyam. She is a Core Committee Member of Makkal Needhi Maiam, a political party founded by Kamal Haasan.

== Career ==
=== Acting ===
She first faced the camera for Murugan Kaattiya Vazhi, directed by P. Madhavan in 1974. Following that, she acted with Rajinikanth, Kamal Haasan, Sivaji Ganesan, and Jaishankar among others.

Sripriya had a string of successful movies in the late 70s and early 80s. She played the lead character in C Rudraiya's 1977 film Aval Appadithan and her portrayal of Manju in the film won her a Tamil Nadu State Award that year. Her other hits include Aattukara Alamelu, Billa and Annai Oru Alayam.

She was in the jury of the National Awards committee and was a member of the State Awards committee.

She was Rajinikanth's leading lady in several of his films. She went on to act with Rajinikanth in 28 films. She has also paired in a number of films with Kamal Haasan as well, second only to Sridevi, who has been paired with Kamal Haasan for over 30 films. She also acted in a number of films which starred both Kamal and Rajini. This list of films includes Illamai Oonjaladukirathu, Aadu Puli Aatam, Alladinum Arputha Vilakkakum, Aval Appadithen and Natchathiram.

Overall, after starting in 1973, she has starred in more than 300 films in all the four South Indian languages, including over 200 in Tamil.

=== Direction ===
Following her acting career, Sripriya took to directing movies. Her directorial debut was 1984 Tamil film Shanti Muhurtam. She directed the film Malini 22 Palayamkottai, taking on the issue of sexual assaults on women. In an interview to the Indian Express, she has stated that "making this film is my way of registering [my] anger".

She has also directed television serials. By 2007, she had directed five serials, of which she considers Viduthalai the best serial. She has directed five films, two in Tamil, two in Kannada and one in Telugu with Venkatesh, Meena and Nadiya Moidu, titled Drushyam.

Sripriya is also a visual artist and the proceeds from her paintings are given to social causes, mainly for children. Additionally, she is a writer and has penned the dialogues for several TV serials and films.

== Early life ==
Sripriya was born in Chennai. She attended Church Park Convent School in Chennai. She is a trained classical dancer and hails from a professional music family including her uncles Natiyakalachakravarthy Padmashri, K. N. Dhandayuthapani Pillai and Rajamanickam Pillai.

== Personal life ==
Sripriya married actor Rajkumar Sethupathy, younger brother of actress Latha, in 1988. The couple has two children, a daughter and a son.

== Awards ==
Year	Award Category	Work	Work
1978	Tamil Nadu State Film Award Special Prize	Aval Appadithan	

=== Honours ===
- 1980: Received title of Kalaimamani Award by the Government of Tamil Nadu, which is the highest state honour in the field of Arts

== Filmography ==
Sripriya has appeared in over 200 films in Tamil. She has also acted in many films in Telugu, Kannada and Malayalam languages.

=== As actress ===
==== Tamil ====
1. Murugan Kaatiya Vazhi (1974)
2. Aval Oru Thodar Kathai (1974)
3. Unnaithan Thambi (1974)
4. Panathukkaga (1974)
5. Pattikkaattu Raja (1975)
6. Karotti Kannan (1975)
7. Thangathile Vairam (1975)
8. Thottadhellam Ponnaagum (1975)
9. Paattum Bharathamum (1975)
10. Aan Pillai Singam (1975)
11. Mogam Muppadhu Varusham (1976)
12. Dasavatharam (1976)
13. Nee Oru Maharani (1976)
14. Mayor Meenakshi (1976)
15. Santhathi (1976)
16. Paalooti Valartha Kili (1976)
17. Vayilla Poochi (1976)
18. Aattukara Alamelu (1977)
19. Thunayiruppal Meenakshi (1977)
20. Navarathinam (1977)
21. Aadu Puli Attam (1977)
22. Palabishegham (1977)
23. Chakravarthy (1977)
24. Madhurageetham (1977)
25. Nallathukku Kalamillai (1977)
26. Odi Vilayadu Thatha (1977)
27. Olimayamana Ethirkalam (1977)
28. Punniyam Seithaval (1977)
29. Sonthamadi Nee Enakku (1977)
30. Ilamai Oonjaladukirathu (1978)
31. Mangudi Minor (1978)
32. Meenakshi Kungumam (1978)
33. Per Solla Oru Pillai (1978)
34. Sri Kanchi Kamakshi (1978)
35. Ullathil Kuzhanthaiyadi (1978)
36. Unakkum Vaazhvu Varum (1978)
37. Vazha Ninaithal Vazhalam (1978)
38. Sattam En Kaiyil (1978)
39. Bairavi (1978)
40. Thai Meethu Sathiyam (1978)
41. Aval Appadithan (1978)
42. En Kelvikku Enna Bathil (1978)
43. Mela Thalangal (1978)
44. Annai Oru Alayam (1979)
45. Chellakili (1979)
46. Ennadi Meenakshi (1979)
47. Mangala Vaathiyam (1979)
48. Suprabadham (1979)
49. Velum Mayilum Thunai (1979)
50. Vetrikku Oruvan (1979)
51. Yarukku Yar Kaaval (1979)
52. Neelakadalin Orathile (1979)
53. Neeya? (1979)
54. Allaudinaum Arputha Vilakkum (1979)
55. Thirisoolam (1979)
56. Billa (1980)
57. Pollathavan (1980)
58. Natchathiram (1980)
59. Avan Aval Adhu (1980)
60. Kannil Theriyum Kathaikal (1980)
61. Oru Marathu Paravaigal (1980)
62. Maria My Darling (1980)
63. Ratha Paasam (1980)
64. Soundaryame Varuga Varuga (1980)
65. Yamanukku Yaman (1980)
66. Amara Kaaviyam (1981)
67. Ram Lakshman (1981)
68. Sathya Sundharam (1981)
69. Srinivasa Kalyanam/Deiva Thirumanangal (1981)
70. Karaiyellam Shenbagapoo (1981)
71. Kanneer Pookkal (1981)
72. Kulakozhundhu (1981)
73. Lorry Driver Rajakannu (1981)
74. Maadi Veettu Ezhai (1981)
75. Thee (1981)
76. Simla Special (1982)
77. Kathoduthan Naan Pesuven (1982)
78. Oorukku Oru Pillai (1982)
79. Oru Varisu Uruvagiradhu (1982)
80. Sangili (1982)
81. Ethanai Konam Ethanai Parvai (1982)
82. Vasandhathil Or Naal (1982)
83. Thyagi (1982)
84. Savaal (1982)
85. Vazhvey Maayam (1982)
86. Parvaiyin Marupakkam (1982)
87. Pagadai Panirendu (1982)
88. Thanikattu Raja (1982)
89. Oppantham (1983)
90. Chiranjeevi (1984)
91. Kadamai (1984)
92. Ninaivugal (1984)
93. Shanthi Muhurtham (1984)
94. Kudumbam (1984)
95. Enakkul Oruvan (1984)
96. Irandu Manam (1985)
97. Natpu (1986)
98. Kodai Mazhai (1986)
99. Sigappu Malargal (1986)
100. Arul Tharum Iyyappan (1987)
101. Kalicharan (1988)
102. Namma Ooru Nayagan (1988)
103. Senthoora Poove (1988)
104. Pongi Varum Kaveri (1989)
105. Pathimoonam Number Veedu (1990)
106. Enga Ooru Aatukkaran (1990)
107. Naane Varuven (1992)
108. Kannamoochi Yenada (2007)

==== Telugu ====
1. Vishali (1974)
2. Chittemma Chilakamma (1975)
3. Anthuleni Katha (1976)
4. Chilakamma Cheppindi (1977)
5. Aame Katha (1977)
6. Vayasu Pilichindi (1978)
7. Pottelu Ponnamma (1978)
8. Dongala Dopidi (1978) – Ganga
9. Patnavasam (1978) – Malli
10. Evvadabba Sommu (1979)
11. Donga Dora (1979)
12. Amma Evarikaina Amma (1979)
13. Captain Krishna (1979)
14. Hare Krishna Hello Radha (1980)
15. Bezawada Bebbuli (1983)
16. Maha Yagnam (1991)
17. Konguchaatu Krishnudu (1993)

==== Kannada ====
1. Maria My Darling (1980) – Maria
2. Jimmy Gallu (1982) – Sudha
3. Hasyaratna Ramakrishna (1982) – Krishnasaani
4. Maneli Ramanna Beedili Kamanna (1983)
5. Karune Illada Kanoonu (1983) – Kavitha
6. Matthe Vasantha (1983) – Vasantha
7. Nagara Mahime (1984)
8. Nagini (1991)
9. Preethi Mado Hudugarigella (2002)
10. Narada Vijaya (2010)

==== Malayalam ====
1. Bhaarya Illaatha Raathri (1975)
2. Aayiram Janmangal (1976)
3. Anthardaaham (1977)
4. Parivarthanam (1977)
5. Allauddinum Albhutha Vilakkum (1979)
6. Karthavyam (1982)
7. Anguram (1982)
8. Himam (1983)
9. Kariyilakkattu Pole (1986)

==== Hindi ====
1. Bechara (1984)

=== As director ===
Year	Film	Language	Notes
1984	Shanthi Muhoortham	Tamil	
1990	Enga Ooru Aattukkaran	Tamil	
1991	Nagini	Kannada	
1992	Naane Varuven	Tamil	
2014	Malini 22 Palayamkottai	Tamil	Remake of Malayalam film 22 Female Kottayam
2014	Drushyam	Telugu	Remake of Malayalam film Drishyam
2016	Ghatana	Telugu	Remake of Malayalam film 22 Female Kottayam

=== As producer ===
1. Neeya? (1979)
2. Natchathiram (1980)
3. Papanasam (2015)

=== Voice Artist ===
Year	Film	Actress
1987	Kadamai Kanniyam Kattupaadu	Geetha
1987	Anand	Radha
1989	Rajadhi Raja	Radha
1989	Nyaya Tharasu	Radha
1991	Idhayam	Heera Rajagopal
1992	Naane Varuven	Sasikala
2000	Alaipayuthey	Jayasudha
2001	Thavasi	Jayasudha

=== As playback singer ===
- Malini 22 Palayamkottai - "Madharthammai" (alongside Karthik)
- Ghatana - "Yennali" (alongside Karthik)

=== Television ===
1. Viduthalai
2. Marakka Mudiyuma
3. Vikramathithan
4. Imsai Arasigal
5. Anandham as Charulatha / Muthulashmi (Abhrirami's mother)
6. Chinna Papa Periya Papa as Chinna Papa - Season 1 and Season 2 (ep 1-52)
