= Pagadai Panirendu =

- Poster
- Directed by: Dhamodharan N.
- Screenplay by: M. Santhinarayanan
- Story by: Abarna Naidu
- Starring: Kamal Haasan; Sripriya; Y. G. Mahendran
- Music by: K. Chakravarthy
- Production company: Sornambika Productions
- Release date: 14 November 1982
- Country: India
- Language: Tamil

Pagadai Panirendu (transl. Twelve dices) is a 1982 Indian Tamil-language martial arts film directed by Dhamodharan N., starring Kamal Haasan, Sripriya and Y. G. Mahendran. Kanchana plays a guest role. The film was released on 14 November 1982.

== Plot ==
The film follows Anand, a journalist and martial arts expert, who is in love with Usha. Anand comes into possession of a microfilm exposing the crimes of underworld kingpin Dais. When Dais’s gang learns of this, they relentlessly pursue Anand to retrieve the microfilm.

Renuka, a member of Dais’s gang, attempts to befriend Anand to obtain the microfilm but fails. Meanwhile, Usha leaves her home after her father, played by Major Sundarrajan, opposes her relationship with Anand. Soon, Usha becomes a target of Dais’s gang, who threaten her in their quest for the microfilm. Anand’s friend, Vishnu, is also ensnared by the gang as part of their efforts to recover it.

In a twist, Anand is forced to confront his own martial arts master, who is revealed to be one of Dais’s aides. Despite the obstacles, Anand ultimately defeats the gang, secures the microfilm, and protects his loved ones.

== Cast ==
- Kamal Haasan – Anand
- Sripriya – Anand's lover Usha
- Kanchana – Anand's mother
- R. N. Sudarshan – Dais
- Major Sundarrajan – Usha's father
- Y. G. Mahendran – Vishnu
- Sathyapriya – Renuka
- Sathyaraj – henchman
- T. K. S. Natarajan

== Soundtrack ==
The music was composed by K. Chakravarthy and lyrics were written by Kannadasan and Vaali.

Song	Singers	Lyrics
"Varavendum Maharajan"	S. P. Balasubrahmanyam, P. Susheela	Kannadasan
"Naan Pathinaru Vayathanaval"	S. Janaki	Kannadasan
"Life Is a Game"	L. R. Eswari & Chorus	Vaali

== Critical reception ==
Thiraignani of Kalki felt Kamal Haasan was only wasting time fighting kung-fu throughout the film but praised the acting of Sripriya but felt other actors were wasted. He however praised Lakshman Gore's cinematography and Kiruba Shankar's stunt choreography and concluded this film is okay for those who love Kamal and action. Balumani of Anna praised the acting, found songs to be okay and called it a treat for the fans of Haasan and karate.
