= Ladies and Gentleman =

- Theatrical release poster
- Directed by: Siddique
- Written by: Siddique
- Produced by: Antony Perumbavoor; Roy C. J.
- Starring: Mohanlal; Meera Jasmine; Mamtha Mohandas; Padmapriya; Mithra Kurian; Krish J. Sathaar; Kalabhavan Shajohn
- Cinematography: Satheesh Kurup
- Edited by: K. R. Gaurishanker
- Music by: Ratheesh Vegha(Songs); Deepak Dev(Score)
- Production companies: Aashirvad Cinemas; Confident Group
- Distributed by: Maxlab Cinemas and Entertainments (India)
- Release date: 12 April 2013
- Running time: 156 minutes
- Country: India
- Language: Malayalam
- Budget: ₹10 crore (US$1.0 million)

Ladies and Gentleman is a 2013 Indian Malayalam-language family drama film written and directed by Siddique and jointly produced by Antony Perumbavoor and Roy C. J. under their production companies Aashirvad Cinemas and Confident Group. It stars Mohanlal, Meera Jasmine, Mamta Mohandas, Padmapriya, Mithra Kurian, Krish J. Sathaar and Kalabhavan Shajohn. The film features original songs composed by Ratheesh Vegha and background score by Deepak Dev. Ladies and Gentleman was released in India on 12 April 2013 on the Vishu festival.

== Plot ==
Chandrabose, a businessman in the Gulf becomes alcoholic after the death of his wife, Ashwathy. Chandrabose likes to keep a low profile and lives a rather carefree life. When he comes to Kochi, he saves a young IT professional Sharath from committing suicide and joins in the firm passing out positive philosophy which takes the firm from a struggling start-up to the top, and makes an impression on Anu, Jyothi, who is Sharath's sister and Chinnu.

== Cast ==
- Mohanlal as Chandrabose (Bose)
- Meera Jasmine as Ashwathy Chandrabose (Achu)
- Mamta Mohandas as Anu Menon
- Padmapriya as Jyothi (Jo)
- Mithra Kurian as Chinnu Kunjunni
- Krish J. Sathaar as Sharath
- Kalabhavan Shajohn as Mani
- Manoj K. Jayan as Anoop
- Krishna Kumar as Sibi Zakkariah
- K. B. Ganesh Kumar as Shivasankara Menon
- Shivaji Guruvayoor as Kunjunni
- Sreelatha Namboothiri as Bhanumathiyamma
- Abu Salim as Vinod
- Chali Pala as Mahendran
- Jaise Jose
- Manu Monayi
- Preethi Das

== Production ==
=== Casting ===
Siddique and Mohanlal planned the film eight years back, and Siddique had the theme in his mind back then. But he was busy with other films. Siddique was collaborating with Mohanlal after two decades since Vietnam Colony (1992), which he co-directed with Lal. Krish. J. Sathaar, son of actors Sathaar and Jayabharathi, makes his debut in films playing the role of Sarath. Siddique had seen Krish's photo a while ago and it was his face that came to his mind while he was searching for that character. About the film Siqqique says, "Ladies and Gentleman is essentially about the generation gap. Often, the older generation is set in their ways while the new generation is eager to believe that they are always right. Young achievers of today are mostly self-made and have a different attitude towards life". There were four heroines in the film—Meera Jasmine, Mamta Mohandas, Mithra Kurian, and Padmapriya Janakiraman. While Meera plays the CEO of a company, Mamta and Mithra plays two software professionals, and Padmapriya is a flight attendant. "Lalettan's[Mohanlal] character Chandrabose is a workaholic who lives abroad, giving more preference to making money in life than anything else. Meera's character is the one who changes his life and makes him understand that it is not money but relationships, values and happiness in life that really matter. Then he tries to pass on that message to a group of youngsters from the IT field who are business-minded and chase happiness in a materialistic life", says the director.

=== Filming ===
Principal photography began with a pooja function held on 17 December 2012. While most of the portions were shot in Kerala, song, dance and few other sequences used in the flashback scenes was shot in Dubai. A bungalow at Kakkanad, Kochi was also a filming location. Ladies and Gentleman is the first film to capture the Dubai Miracle Garden, where the song and dance sequence of Mohanlal and Meera was shot. The film was also shot inside the IMAX theater Meydan. Filming in Dubai was done with support from the Dubai Film and TV Commission. Mini Sharma, the CEO of 7Media was the line producer in Dubai. The filming was wrapped on 19 March 2013 after a six days shoot there. With a crew of about 20 men, filming took place across several areas in Dubai, including the Dubai Miracle Garden, Dubai Media City, Marina Walk, Dubai Creek and Jumeirah Beach Residence. Some scenes were shot in a car showroom in Al Ain, Abu Dhabi.

== Release ==
Ladies and Gentleman was distributed by Maxlab Cinemas and Entertainments. The film was released on 12 April 2013 in the country, during the festival of Vishu. It was released in 100 theatres across Kerala. PJ Entertainments distributed the film in Europe. The satellite rights were purchased by Asianet Communications Ltd.

=== Pre-release revenue ===
The film did a good pre-release business. Antony Perumbavoor and Roy C. J. invested close to ₹ 10 crores and received a profit of ₹ 1.5 crore before the theatrical release. The film brought in ₹ 11.5 crores in satellite, remake, and overseas rights due to the market value of Mohanlal and Siddique. It was the first time a Malayalam film was generating an amount over ₹ 11 crores before its release.

=== Home media ===
The home media rights of Ladies and Gentleman were purchased by Central Home Entertainment, and the DVDs were released on 9 October 2013.

== Reception ==
=== Critical response ===
Sify.com called it "average" and said, "Siddique, who has created some of the finest comedies in Malayalam history, seems to have lost his way with this one. Satheesh Kurup's visuals are fine, but Ratheesh Vegha's music doesn't impress much". Smitha of One India praised Mohanlal's acting but criticized the script saying "It is a light-hearted film with many comic situations. The script is half-baked. Moreover, the climax is a complete let down. Though the film starts off well, the second half falters and you are unable to make much sense of what director intended to do".

Manu of NowRunning.com rated 2.1/5 and said that "The screenplay is half-baked in the first half. It gets a little bit interesting in the second part, though it goes on downhill very soon", and gave positive remarks to the cinematography, songs, and film score. The reviewer of Indiaglitz.com criticized the script, film score and songs but praised the cinematography, rating it 5/10.

Rajeevan of MetroMatinee.com praised the lead performance, cinematography, film score and editing but criticized the songs and script saying "There is not much strength in the story but Mohanlal's presence and the way the story is presented makes some difference. Mohanlal, in the lead role as a sluggish inebriated hero with a hidden intent, makes the movie watchable" Aswin J. Kumar of The Times of India rated the film 2.5/5 and stated "Ladies and Gentleman engage only in sparse moments; courtesy Shajon, who digs up some laughter from a parched narrative. It's not the celebration of virtues that mars the purpose, but a palpable lack of earnestness with which Siddique moulds his plot developed by ill-shaped characters."

=== Box office ===
After a good opening, the film did not maintain the reception in the following weeks at the box office. Even then, Ladies and Gentleman completed 6,500 shows in Kerala theaters in five weeks. However, the film's theatrical run was affected when unlicensed copies of the film were illegally uploaded on the Internet in May 2013. Despite that, the film managed to run for more than 50 days in theaters.

== Soundtrack ==
Ladies and Gentleman

Soundtrack album by Ratheesh Vegha
- Released: 2 April 2013
- Recorded: 2012
- Genre: Film soundtrack
- Length: 25:32
- Language: Malayalam
- Label: Eastcoast Audios
- Producer: Antony Perumbavoor

Ratheesh Vegha chronology
| Lucky Star (2013) | Ladies and Gentleman (2013) | Orissa (2013) |

The soundtrack was composed by Ratheesh Vegha, with lyrics penned by Rafeeq Ahmed and Salavoodheen Kecheri. The album consists of seven songs. The album was launched on 1 April 2013 at IMA Hall in Kochi. The event was attended by Mohanlal, Siddique, Ratheesh Vegha, Krish. J. Sathaar, Meera Jasmine, Mamta Mohandas, East Coast Vijayan and members of the technical crew and cast.

Tracklist
| No. | Title | Lyrics | Singer(s) | Length |
|---|---|---|---|---|
| 1. | "Pranayame" | Rafeeq Ahmed | Haricharan, Saindhavi | 4:50 |
| 2. | "Palaniram Padarumi" | Rafeeq Ahmed | Karthik, Sooraj Santhosh | 3:56 |
| 3. | "Kandathinappuram" | Rafeeq Ahmed | Vijay Yesudas, Manjari | 4:30 |
| 4. | "Ladies and Gentleman" | Rafeeq Ahmed | Rahul Nambiar, Sricharan, Ankitha Lakshmi | 4:42 |
| 5. | "Pranayame" | Rafeeq Ahmed | Saindhavi | 4:50 |
| 6. | "Pallivalu" | Salavoodheen Kecheri | Biju Narayanan, Sreelakshmi | 5:40 |
| 7. | "Pranayame" | Rafeeq Ahmed | Haricharan | 4:50 |
| Total length: | | | | 31:18 |
