= Maria My Darling =

1980 film directed by Durai

- VCD cover in Kannada
- Directed by: Durai
- Written by: Thirumathi S. Madhu; N. Bhaskar (dialogues)
- Produced by: Thirumathi S. Madhu
- Starring: Kamal Haasan; Sripriya
- Cinematography: V. Ranga
- Edited by: M. Vellasami
- Music by: Shankar–Ganesh
- Production company: Durgeswari Films
- Release dates: 14 November 1980 (Kannada); 19 December 1980 (Tamil)
- Country: India
- Languages: Kannada; Tamil

Maria My Darling is a 1980 Indian action thriller film directed by Durai, starring Kamal Haasan and Sripriya. The film was made as a bilingual and was shot in both Kannada and Tamil.

== Plot ==
Maria, a bold woman, searches for and seeks revenge against the person who killed her mother.

== Cast ==
Cast (Kannada)	Cast (Tamil)	Role
Kamal Haasan		Raghu
Sripriya		Maria
Vajramuni	Srikanth	Shyam "Raja"
Shivaram	Thengai Srinivasan	Sunder Rao
M. P. Shankar	Major Sundarrajan	Maria's father
Udaykumar		Mahadeva "Ramdas"
T. N. Balakrishna	V. S. Raghavan	Krishnappa
R. N. Sudarshan		CBI officer Stephen
Natraj		
Baby Indira		
Kunigal Nagabhushan		waiter

== Production ==
The film was shot in Bangalore.

== Soundtrack ==
Shankar–Ganesh composed the music for the soundtracks with Kannada lyrics penned by Chi. Udayashankar and Tamil lyrics penned by Kannadasan, Aalangudi Somu and Pulamaipithan.

Kannada
No.	Title	Lyrics	Singer(s)	Length
1.	"Maria My Darling" (Version 1)	Chi. Udayashankar	S. P. Balasubrahmanyam	6:31
2.	"Obba Ninge"	Chi. Udayashankar	Kamal Haasan	5:57
3.	"Naanindhu"	Chi. Udayashankar	S. P. Balasubrahmanyam, Vani Jairam	4:53
4.	"Hoovanthe Naanu Olidaaga"	Chi. Udayashankar	S. Janaki	9:09
5.	"Maria My Darling" (Version 2)	Chi. Udayashankar	S. P. Balasubrahmanyam	4:29
6.	"Maria My Darling" (Version 3)	Chi. Udayashankar	S. P. Balasubrahmanyam	5:10

Tamil
No.	Title	Lyrics	Singer(s)	Length
1.	"Maria My Darling"	Kannadasan	S. P. Balasubrahmanyam
2.	"Rasathi Pakka Aasai"	Pulamaipithan	Kamal Haasan
3.	"Vaanga Naina"	Kannadasan	S. Janaki
4.	"Unnaithan Enni"	Kannadasan	S. Janaki
5.	"Yen Indha"	Aalangudi Somu	S. P. Balasubrahmanyam, Vani Jairam
6.	"Sowkiyama"

== Reception ==
The film was a box-office bomb.
