= Mangala Vaathiyam =

- DVD cover
- Directed by: K. Shankar
- Written by: P. Kalaimani
- Produced by: Gopikrishnan
- Starring: Kamal Haasan; Sripriya; Nagesh
- Music by: M. S. Viswanathan
- Production company: Saregama Films
- Release date: 21 September 1979
- Country: India
- Language: Tamil

Mangala Vaathiyam (transl. Auspicious music) is a 1979 Indian Tamil-language film, directed by K. Shankar and produced by Gopikrishnan son of M. S. Viswanathan. The film stars Kamal Haasan, Sripriya, Y. G. Mahendran and Nagesh. It was released on 21 September 1979.

== Cast ==
- Kamal Haasan as Santhana Gopalakrishnan Udayar
- Sripriya as Yamuna
- M. N. Nambiar as Nambiappa the Karate Master, Lakshmi's Father
- Nagesh as Kanakku, Andal's secretary
- Idichapuli Selvaraj as Mottai Andipandaaram, Andal's Sidekick
- S. S. Chandran as Andal's second Sidekick
- Vanna-Kollangal Kanakku Vathiyar as Iyer, Andal's third Sidekick
- Y. G. Mahendran as usual Cringe Character
- Gandhimathi as Andal, Santhana Gopalakrishnan Udayar's Mother
- Srikanth (cameo) as usual Twistu Character
- V. K. Ramasamy as Sambandham Udayar, Y.G. Mahendran's Cringe Character's Father
- T. K. S. Natarajan

== Soundtrack ==
Soundtrack was composed by M. S. Viswanathan and lyrics were written by Kannadasan.

Track list
No.	Title	Singer(s)	Length
1.	"Vandinna vandithaan"	S. P. Balasubrahmanyam
2.	"Rasathi Kungumam"	S. P. Balasubrahmanyam, Vani Jairam
3.	"Sorgam Therikiradhu"	S. Janaki
4.	"Vellaikaaka Mallakka Parakkudhu"	T. M. Soundararajan
5.	"Thulli Varum Kaalai"	Malaysia Vasudevan, S. Janaki

== Release and reception ==
Mangala Vaathiyam was released on 21 September 1979. Kousigan of Kalki wrote that writer Kalaimani and director K. Sankar had tried their best to make Mangala Vaathiyam entertaining but it was not fulfilling.
