= Ninaivugal =

- Poster
- Directed by: M. Velaisamy
- Written by: A. L. Narayanan
- Produced by: V. Mohan
- Starring: Sripriya; Karthik; Radha; Sarath Babu
- Cinematography: J. P. Selvam
- Edited by: M. Velaisamy; R. Krishnamurthy
- Music by: Shankar–Ganesh
- Production company: Priyadarshani Films
- Release date: 9 June 1984
- Country: India
- Language: Tamil

Ninaivugal (transl. Memories) is a 1984 Indian Tamil-language film co-edited and directed by M. Velaisamy and written by A. L. Narayanan. The film stars Sripriya, Karthik, Radha and Sarath Babu. It was released on 9 June 1984.

== Plot ==
The story is about how a woman faces problems in different stages of her life.

== Cast ==
- Radha
- Sripriya
- Karthik
- Sarath Babu
- Thengai Srinivasan
- Manorama
- Pushpalatha
- Peeli Sivam

== Soundtrack ==
The music was composed by Shankar–Ganesh.

Track listing
No.	Title	Lyrics	Singer(s)	Length
1.	"Naan Kaadhal Leelai Kannan"	Pulamaipithan	S. P. Balasubrahmanyam, S. Janaki
2.	"Odai Thanneeril"	Vaali	K. J. Yesudas, Vani Jairam
3.	"Rathiriukku Mappillai"	Mu. Metha	S. P. Balasubrahmanyam, Vani Jairam
4.	"Kuthuthaiyya"	Vaali	S. P. Sailaja
5.	"Kadavul Kannodu"	Vaali	P. Susheela
6.	"Kovil Deivam Nee"	Vaali	P. Susheela, S. P. Balasubrahmanyam

== Critical reception ==
Jayamanmadhan of Kalki felt the film was like a serial story that started without a proper plan, there is nothing like reminiscing in the twisting and twisting of the story, even if it is not tiring while watching it and concluded despite the title which never change as the scent of a past life, it's a film without lagging.
