= Naane Raja (1984 film) =

Nane Raja
- Directed by: C. V. Rajendran
- Written by: Somu
- Screenplay by: Somu
- Produced by: M. P. Shankar
- Starring: V. Ravichandran; Ambika; Jai Jagadish; Ambareesh
- Cinematography: V. K. Kannan
- Edited by: Victor Yadav
- Music by: Shankar–Ganesh
- Production company: Bharani Chithra
- Release date: 17 February 1984
- Country: India
- Language: Kannada

Nane Raja is a 1984 Indian Kannada-language film, directed by C. V. Rajendran and produced by M. P. Shankar. The film stars V. Ravichandran, Ambika, Jai Jagadish, and Ambareesh. The film's musical score was done by Shankar-Ganesh. The director remade the film in Telugu as Chiranjeevi (1985).

== Plot ==
Raja is the son of a Police commissioner and admires his father very much. He falls in love with a singer, Asha, who performs at his birthday party. Asha rejects his approaches. A few days later, Raja goes to see Asha at her home to convey his feelings. Asha rejects him again and belittles him and his father. Hearing her rather rash words at his father, Raja gets enraged and slaps Asha. In a freak accident, she dies immediately. What follows next is a series of murders that Raja commits in his attempt at hiding the accidental death caused by him.

== Cast ==
- V. Ravichandran as Raja
- Ambika as Asha
- Jai Jagadish as Mohan
- Ambareesh as Inspector Raghu (cameo)
- Kumari Indira
- M. P. Shankar as Police Commissioner
- Master Arjun
- Shivaram as Maruthi
- Mukunda
- Somu
- H. P. Basavaraj
- Chandrashekar
- Raghunandan
- P. J. Raju
- P. J. Dayashankar
- P. J. Vishwanath

== Soundtrack ==
The music was composed by Shankar–Ganesh.

No.	Song	Singers	Lyrics	Length (m:ss)
1	"Aasegalu Kenakuthalide"	S. Janaki, S. P. Balasubrahmanyam	Chi. Udaya Shankar	
2	"Ella Nanagagi"	S. P. Balasubrahmanyam	Chi. Udaya Shankar	
3	"Benkiya Muttida Mele"	S. P. Balasubrahmanyam	Chi. Udaya Shankar	
