= Kanneer Pookkal =

- Theatrical release poster
- Directed by: Rajasekhar
- Screenplay by: Rajasekhar
- Based on: Aayul Thandanai by Sivasankari
- Produced by: Jayalakshmi Hari; R. Ganapathy
- Starring: Vijayan; Sripriya
- Cinematography: V. Ranga
- Edited by: M. Vellaichamy
- Music by: Shankar–Ganesh
- Production company: Jayavel Productions
- Release date: 10 April 1981
- Country: India
- Language: Tamil

Kanneer Pookkal (transl. Flowers of tears) is a 1981 Indian Tamil-language film written and directed by Rajasekhar. The film stars Vijayan and Sripriya, with Anand, Anumanthu, Vijay Babu, Manorama, Pandari Bai, Rohini and Roopa in supporting roles. Based on the novel Aayul Thandanai (transl. Life sentence) by Sivasankari, it was released on 10 April 1981.

== Cast ==
- Vijayan
- Sripriya
- Anand
- Anumanthu
- Vijay Babu
- Manorama
- Pandari Bai
- Rohini
- Roopa

== Production ==
Kanneer Pookkal shares its name with a novel by Mu. Metha, but is actually adapted from Aayul Thandanai by Sivasankari. It is the first Tamil film directed by Rajasekhar. Cinematography was handled by V. Ranga and editing by M. Vellaichamy.

== Soundtrack ==
The music was composed by Shankar–Ganesh. The song "Maadi Veettu Mama" attained popularity.

Track listing
No.	Title	Lyrics	Singer(s)	Length
1.	"Kaviya Mullai"	Vairamuthu	S. P. Balasubrahmanyam	4:35
2.	"Iravum Pagalum"	Vaali	S. Janaki	4:36
3.	"Vasanthamum Neeye"	Pulamaipithan	S. Janaki	4:45
4.	"Maadi Veettu Mama"	Poongkuyilan	Ambili and chorus	4:21
Total length:				18:17

== Reception ==
Nalini Sastry of Kalki praised the performances of Vijayan and Sripriya and Ranga's cinematography. She concluded the review by saying the film is not a life sentence for us, however the praise is for Sivasankari. Naagai Dharuman of Anna praised the acting of the cast and the dialogues.
