= Seervarisai =

- Theatrical release poster
- Directed by: K. Sornam
- Written by: K. Sornam
- Produced by: Kovai Chezhiyan
- Starring: Muthuraman; Lakshmi
- Cinematography: Amirtham
- Edited by: K. Narayanan
- Music by: M. S. Viswanathan
- Production company: Kay Cee Films
- Release date: 15 September 1978
- Country: India
- Language: Tamil

Seervarisai (transl. Post-marriage offerings) is a 1978 Indian Tamil-language film written and directed by K. Sornam, and produced by Kovai Chezhiyan. The film stars Muthuraman and Lakshmi. It began production in 1973 but was released only five years later, on 15 September 1978.

== Cast ==
- Muthuraman
- Lakshmi
- Thengai Srinivasan
- Srikanth
- Ashokan
- T. K. Bhagavathi
- Vennira Aadai Moorthy
- Manorama
- Sukumari

== Production ==
The film began production in early 1973. The scene where Lakshmi and Sukumari argue with each other was shot at Bharani Studios in Madras. Some scenes were shot at Goa.

== Soundtrack ==
The music was composed by M. S. Viswanathan, with lyrics by Kannadasan. The LP records were released in 1973.

Track listing
No.	Title	Singer(s)	Length
1.	"Kannanai Ninaikkadha"	S. P. Balasubrahmanyam, P. Susheela
2.	"Sengottai Passenger"	L. R. Eswari
3.	"Pachangam Parthu Sollava"	S. P. Balasubrahmanyam, P. Susheela
4.	"Poorva Jenmam"	S. Janaki

== Release and reception ==
Seervarisai was released on 15 September 1978. Kousigan of Kalki said that, had the film been released earlier, the storyline would have seemed innovative to viewers, but now looked like a much older film. Naagai Dharuman of Anna praised the acting, humour, music, cinematography, dialogues and direction.
