= Pudhiya Vazhkai =

- Directed by: C. V. Rajendran
- Screenplay by: Thooyavan
- Story by: Peter Selvakumar
- Produced by: S. Soorya Prakash; S. Rajan; R. Ranganathan; R. Parthasarathy
- Starring: Jaishankar; R. Muthuraman; Nagesh; Jayabharathi; A. Sakunthala
- Cinematography: S. Maruthi Rao
- Edited by: N. M. Shankar
- Music by: K. V. Mahadevan
- Production company: Babu Movies
- Release date: 9 September 1971
- Country: India
- Language: Tamil

Pudhiya Vazhkai (transl. New life) is a 1971 Indian Tamil-language film, directed by C. V. Rajendran. The film stars Jaishankar, R. Muthuraman, Nagesh, Jayabharathi and A. Sakunthala. It was released on 9 September 1971.

== Cast ==
- Jaishankar as Shankar
- Jayabharathi as Vijaya
- Nagesh as Ramesh
- R. Muthuraman as Raju
- A. Sakunthala as Kalpana
- S. V. Sahasranamam
- V. K. Ramasamy
- T. S. B. K. Moulee
- Sachu
- V. Vasantha
- V. Thilagam
- "Baby" Dolly as Shanthi
- Jayanthi as Uma (Guest Appearance)
- Pandari Bai (Guest Appearance)

== Soundtrack ==
The music was composed by K. V. Mahadevan, with lyrics by Kannadasan.

Song	Singers
"Pesu Maname Pesu"	S. P. Balasubrahmanyam
"Party Dance"	Instrumental
"Kaalam Ennodu Varum Pothu"	S. Janaki
"Paada Therinthavar Paadungal"	S. Janaki
"Ithu Oru Thani Ulagam"	T. M. Soundararajan
