= To Noora with Love =

- Directed by: Babu Narayanan
- Screenplay by: G. S. Anil
- Story by: C. H. Muhammad
- Produced by: Muhammed Ansar
- Starring: Mamta Mohandas; Krish J. Sathaar; Kaniha; Archana Kavi
- Cinematography: Alagappan N.
- Edited by: Johnkutty
- Music by: Mohan Sithara; Gopi Sundar (Background Score)
- Production company: Don Bros International
- Distributed by: Grand Production
- Release date: 1 May 2014
- Running time: 139 minutes
- Country: India
- Language: Malayalam

To Noora with Love is a 2014 Indian Malayalam-language romantic film directed by Babu Narayanan and produced by Muhammed Ansar. Mamta Mohandas, Krish J. Sathaar, Kaniha, and Archana Kavi play the lead roles in the film. Filming started in January 2014.

== Plot ==
The plot revolves around a Muslim couple, Noorjahan aka Noora and Shahjahan. The movie begins showing Noora in the hospital for delivery with some complications. Depressed Shahjahan goes away from the hospital only to meet with an accident hitting his head with a stone. The movie takes a flashback. Noorjahan is a social activist who also won 1 crore rupees from the game show Crorepati to offer to the orphanage. Shahjahan is a Sufi singer. She uses "Phone-a-Friend" lifeline and calls Shahjahan to help her answer the last question which was based on Sufi singers, to which he gives her the correct answer. Soon it is telecasted on television. From that day onwards, Shahjahan tries to meet Noora whom he has never met. She falls in love and proposes to Shahjahan in a public mall for marriage. In the wedding ceremony of Dr. Sreeparvathi, Noora's close and childhood friend, Shahjahan kisses Noora to teach her a lesson for insulting him in public in front of everyone and all blame Noora for this. Shahjahan regrets his action and asks her forgiveness. Finally, both get married with a lot of celebrations.

One day, Noora and her friends along with their husbands go on an outing. While Noora and Shahjahan are boating, Noora faints and falls into the water when she is pregnant. After some days, her nose starts bleeding. Dr. Sajan Varghese tells the couple to abort the child because Noora is suffering from dilated cardiomyopathy, causing her heart to work slowly which may create complications during the delivery and even death. However, the couple decides to continue with her pregnancy and leaves the rest in God's hands. Finally, the delivery date arrives, and Noora is admitted to the hospital. The whole town prays for her as she is a good activist. Now, the movie is back to Shahjahan's accident. By God's grace Noora and her baby are out of danger. Shahjahan has a severe head injury, and both him and Noora are in the same ICU room. Seeing Shahjahan injured, her health becomes critical. The doctor advises the family to get a heart donor as Noora's heart has to be transplanted immediately within 48 hours. A donor is found and Noora is alright. When the media asks the doctors about the donor's name Dr. Varghese replies that he is a man who loved Noora and touched her heart who comes out to be Brother James.

== Cast ==
- Mamta Mohandas as Noorjahan aka Noora
- Krish J. Sathaar as Shahjahan
- Kaniha as Sainaba, Shahjahan's only elder sister
- Archana Kavi as Dr. Sreeparvathi, Noora's best friend
- Nedumudi Venu as Dr. Sajan Varghese
- Ambika as Noora's mother
- Ramesh Pisharody as Brother James
- Sreedevi Unni
- Biyon
- Munna
- Madhupal
- Mamukkoya
- Kozhikode Narayanan Nair
- Niyas Backer
- Kannur Sreelatha
- Anees Oscario
- Mukesh as Special Appearance in the game show

== Soundtrack ==
The music was composed by Mohan Sithara, with lyrics written by Sarath Vayalar.

| No. | Song | Singers | Lyrics | Length (m:ss) |
|---|---|---|---|---|
| 1 | "Kannale Kothichatham" | Devie Neithiyar | Sarath Vayalar | |
| 2 | "Love Mystery" | Priya Jerson | Sarath Vayalar | |
| 3 | "Oodin Puka" | Najim Arshad | Sarath Vayalar | |
| 4 | "Pira Nee" | Shankar Mahadevan | Sarath Vayalar | |
| 5 | "Swarna Pattu" | Jisha Nevin | Sarath Vayalar | |
