= Malini 22 Palayamkottai =

2014 Indian film by Sripriya

- Theatrical release poster
- Directed by: Sripriya
- Screenplay by: Sripriya
- Story by: Abhilash Kumar; Syam Pushkaran
- Produced by: Rajkumar Sethupathy
- Starring: Nithya Menen; Krish J. Sathaar
- Cinematography: Manoj Pillai
- Edited by: Bavan Sreekumar
- Music by: Aravind–Shankar
- Production company: Rajkumar Theatres Pvt Ltd
- Distributed by: Wide Angle Creations
- Release date: 24 January 2014
- Country: India
- Language: Tamil

Malini 22 Palayamkottai is a 2014 Indian Tamil-language thriller film directed by Sripriya. It stars Nithya Menen in the title role while Krish J. Sathaar and Naresh play supporting roles. A remake of the Malayalam film 22 Female Kottayam (2012) by Aashiq Abu, the film features musical score by Arvind-Shankar. This film was simultaneously shot in Telugu as Ghatana, which was released two years later. Malini 22 Palayamkottai was released on 24 January 2014.

== Plot ==
Malini is a nursing student in Bangalore with plans of traveling to Toronto for a career. She meets Varun from the travel consultancy agency working towards setting up her visa. They soon fall in love and start living together. Malini loves him with all her heart and takes their relationship and living together seriously.

One day while at a pub, a guy misbehaves with Malini, and Varun beats him up badly. The guy tries to take revenge on Varun and searches for him. Varun goes into hiding with the help of his boss Prakash. Prakash arrives at Varun's home to inform Malini about the situation. He then plainly asks Malini if he can have sex with her. A shocked Malini is then brutally attacked and raped. When Varun finds out what happened, he becomes violent and wants to kill Prakash. Malini calms him down, saying that she does not want to make the incident worse than it is; she instead wants to get to Canada at the earliest. Once Malini recovers from her injuries, Prakash visits her again to ask for forgiveness. He comes while Varun is not around and rapes her a second time. Malini decides not to travel abroad and plans to murder Prakash.

Varun discusses the situation with Prakash, who suggests killing Malini and appoints Varun to do it. Varun traps Malini by putting some drugs in her bag. The police arrests Malini, and she is imprisoned. While Malini calls out for help, she finds Varun simply walking away from her, which is when she realizes that he set her up. Varun relocates to Chennai and runs a modeling agency. While in prison, Malini meets Janaki, who is sentenced for murder. Through Janaki's criminal world connections, Malini realizes that Varun is a known pimp and was cheating her along with Prakash's support. Janaki and Malini bond well with each other, and Janaki molds a criminal mindset within her for the strength and courage needed to strike back at Varun and Prakash.

When the court sets her free, Malini, with the help of DK, kills Prakash by poisoning him with a cobra. Next, she arrives in Chennai as a femme fatale in search of Varun while pretending to be a model. Later one night, Malini hooks up with Varun in his studio. Varun, who had recognized her earlier, reveals it angrily berates her. He beats her and abuses her by calling her a "slut who does any 'adjustment' to flourish her career" for stopping her further being a menace to him. His frustration dissolves slowly as he wants to enjoy her company. He reminds her she is a mere woman.

However, at night, Malini executes her revenge plan and sedates Varun and sadistically penectomises him. When he regains consciousness, she tells him that she has removed his male organ through a medical surgery. While Varun finds himself in intense pain and bound to his bed, she taunts him to make him realize his faults and the gross wrongdoings he committed to her and rationalizes her crime. But he does not yield to her taunts and reveals a backstory concerning his mother and that his life as a pimp is not entirely his fault.

Malini tells Varun that she knows that she is still somewhere in his heart. She reminds him that she has only lost someone who cheated on her, whereas he lost someone who genuinely loved him. Now Varun is stunned that he is not even able to face Malini. Varun recollects that her love was true and his love was overshadowed by his male supremacy concept and greed for wealth. Over the days, he admits his actions that caused her pain. Then Malini leaves him, but not before inviting him to settle the score with her, if any remains there. Varun accepts the challenge of a true criminal as he is and taunts her that he will confront her when he is ready, most probably knowing that he has to settle the score with her in terms of true love with roots in violence. Malini leaves for Canada, dismantles her cell phone, and cuts further contact with DK.

== Cast ==
- Nithya Menen as Malini
- Krish J. Sathaar as Varun
- Naresh as Prakash
- Kota Srinivasa Rao as Santhanam
- Kovai Sarala as Sarala
- Mohan Raman as the doctor
- A. C. Murali Mohan as Lalitha's husband who is having an affair with Jency.
- Gowthami Vembunathan as P. Vidya
- Vidyullekha Raman as Shalini
- D. Janagi as Janaki
- Anjali Rao as Jency

== Soundtrack ==
Soundtrack was composed by Aravind–Shankar. All lyrics by Na. Muthukumar.

- "Vinmeengal" – Shakthisree Gopalan
- "Kanneer Thuliye" – Vijay Yesudas
- "Kanneer Thuliye (Duet)" – Vijay Yesudas, Nithya Menen
- "My Name is Malini" – Nithya Menen
- "Madharthammai" – Karthik, Sripriya
- "Madharthammai (Immigrant Mix)" – Nithya Menen

== Critical reception ==
Baradwaj Rangan from The Hindu wrote, "There's not one convincing moment in the movie. The performances are broad, the staging is most basic, and too much time is spent on Malini's dreary backstory. The minor victory of the film is that we get to hear the F-word, in all its un-beeped-out glory". Sify wrote, "It's unfair to compare the original with a remake in another language but a film that had all the ingredients which will make the audiences glued to their seats never come together and ends up as a damp squib". The Times of India gave it 2 stars out of 5 and wrote, "Even if director Sripriya had stuck close to the original, we would have got an engaging thriller, but here, bludgeons even the tiniest bit of subtlety found in the original to give us a clumsy film that attempts to form a social awakening while putting its viewers to sleep". The New Indian Express called it "a disappointing fare. Comparisons are odious, but inevitable. This version not just falls short of the earlier one, but also fails to be gripping, even when viewed on its own merits".

Rediff gave it 2.5 stars out of 5 and wrote, "Malini 22 Palayamkottai deals with an extremely relevant issue of contemporary society. The subject is well handled by Sripriya, but the film does get a bit dramatic in the end". Deccan Herald wrote, "That it falls short of a taut, edge-of-the-seat nifty thriller and turns out trite, tiresome affair is a sad letdown given the film seeks to turn the spotlight on rather demeaning and diastaseful attitude towards women looked at more as sex objects than equal, respectful partners".
