= K. Sornam =

Indian writer (1933–2021)

- Born: 1933; Thirukkuvalai, Madras Presidency, British India
- Died: 8 June 2021 (aged 87–88); Chennai, Tamil Nadu, India
- Other names: Swarnam, Swornam
- Occupations: Writer, director, journalist

K. Sornam (1933 – 8 June 2021) was an Indian journalist, screenwriter and director who worked in Tamil cinema. He was active in the second half of the 1900s, and shared close associations with chief ministers of Tamil Nadu Karunanidhi and M. G. Ramachandran.

== Film career ==
Born in Thirukkuvalai, Sornam worked as a literary writer with his relative, Karunanidhi. He had a key role in the operations of the Dravida Munnetra Kazhagam's political newspaper, Murasoli. While at Murasoli, Sornam brought out the supplement Pudhayal, and also worked on archiving Karunanidhi's writings. In the 1960s, he worked on the theatrical play Vidai Kodu Thaaye (Bid Me Farewell Mother), a revolutionary play written to highlight the need for social reforms. For his script, he was presented with an award by C. N. Annadurai.

Sornam went on to enrol in film institute in Chennai, besides becoming the secretary of Tamil Eyal Isai Nadaga Manram, a theatre organisation. Sornam wrote the dialogues for 3 movies starring MGR, including Nam Naadu (1969), Adimai Penn (1969) and Ulagam Sutrum Valiban (1973). He also directed films with actors such as Sivakumar and Kamal Haasan in Thangathile Vairam (1975), R. Muthuraman's Seer Varisai (1976), and Jaishankar's Aasai Manaivi (1977).

In 1987, he directed the film Ore Raththam featuring Karthik in the lead role. The film has since garnered attention for marking the acting debut of politician M. K. Stalin. In the 1990s, Sornam was later the editor-in-charge for the magazine Ilaya Suriyan, that had been created by M. K. Stalin, and regularly served as the political party's voice.

== Death ==
Sornam died on 8 June 2021, aged 88, due to age-related ailments.

== Partial filmography ==
Year	Film	Credited as		Notes
Year	Film	Director	Writer	Notes
1960	Aada Vandha Deivam	✗	✓	
1969	Nam Naadu	✗	✓	
1969	Adimai Penn	✗	✓	
1971	Kumari Kottam	✗	✓	screenplay credits
1973	Ulagam Sutrum Valiban	✗	✓	
1975	Thangathile Vairam	✓	✓	
1976	Nee Oru Maharani	✓	✓	
1977	Aasai Manaivi	✓	✓	
1978	Ganga Yamuna Kaveri	✓	✓	
1978	Seervarisai	✓	✓	
1978	Mela Thalangal	✓	✓	
1979	Naan Oru Kai Paarkiren	✓	✓	
1987	Ore Raththam	✓	✗	
