= Kannil Theriyum Kathaikal =

- Theatrical release poster
- Directed by: Devaraj–Mohan
- Dialogues by: Azhagapuri Azhagappan; Amudhavan
- Story by: Srikrishna Alanahalli
- Produced by: A. L. Raghavan
- Starring: Sarath Babu; Sripriya; Vadivukkarasi; M. N. Rajam
- Cinematography: Marcus Bartley Junior
- Edited by: T. Krishna
- Music by: Score: Ilaiyaraaja; Songs: Ilaiyaraaja; K. V. Mahadevan; G. K. Venkatesh; Shankar–Ganesh; Agathiyar
- Production company: Raja Meenakshi Films
- Release date: 14 March 1980
- Country: India
- Language: Tamil

Kannil Theriyum Kathaikal (transl. Stories in the eyes) is a 1980 Indian Tamil-language film directed by Devaraj–Mohan and produced by A. L. Raghavan. The film stars Sarath Babu, Sripriya, Vadivukkarasi and M. N. Rajam. The songs for this film were composed by five composers: K. V. Mahadevan, G. K. Venkatesh, Shankar–Ganesh (a duo), T. R. Pappa (credited as Agathiyar) and Ilaiyaraaja. The film, released on 14 March 1980, failed commercially.

== Cast ==
- Sarath Babu
- Sripriya
- Vadivukkarasi
- M. N. Rajam
- Senthamarai
- Vennira Aadai Moorthy

== Production ==
Kannil Theriyum Kathaikal was produced by playback singer A. L. Raghavan under Raja Meenakshi Films and was directed by the duo Devaraj–Mohan. Azhagapuri Azhagappan and Amuthavan wrote the dialogue, while T. Krishna was the editor. Film News Anandan worked as the film's public relations officer, and Marcus Bartley Junior was the cinematographer. The filming was held at locations such as Nagarjuna Sagar, Paritala in Andhra Pradesh.

== Soundtrack ==
The soundtrack consists of five songs. K. V. Mahadevan, G. K. Venkatesh, Shankar–Ganesh (a duo), T. R. Pappa (credited as Agathiyar) and Ilaiyaraaja composed one song each. Ilaiyaraaja composed the film's score. The song "Naan Oru Ponnoviyam" is set in the Carnatic raga known as Mohanam.

Track listing
No.	Title	Lyrics	Music	Singer(s)	Length
1.	"Naan Oru Ponnoviyam"	Pulamaipithan	Ilaiyaraaja	S. P. Balasubrahmanyam, P. Susheela S.Janaki
2.	"Naan Unnai Nenaichchane"	Vaali	Shankar–Ganesh	S. P. Balasubrahmanyam, Vani Jairam and Jikki
3.	"Onnu Rendu Moonu"	Vasukinathan	Agathiyar	S. P. Sailaja and B. S. Sasirekha
4.	"Vettaikaaran"	Kannadasan	K. V. Mahadevan	T. M. Soundararajan
5.	"Naan Paartha Rathidevi"	Muthulingam	G. K. Venkatesh	A. L. Raghavan

== Critical reception ==
Naagai Dharuman of Anna praised the actors, dialogues, music, cinematography and direction.
