= Thangathile Vairam =

- Poster
- Directed by: K. Sornam
- Screenplay by: K. Sornam
- Story by: Kalaignanam
- Produced by: Soundhar
- Starring: Sivakumar; Kamal Haasan; Jayachitra; Sripriya
- Music by: Shankar–Ganesh
- Production company: Sooralaya Productions
- Release date: 16 May 1975
- Country: India
- Language: Tamil

Thangathile Vairam (transl. Diamond in the gold) is a 1975 Indian Tamil-language film directed by K. Sornam, starring Sivakumar, Kamal Haasan, Jayachitra and Sripriya. The film's story was written by Kalaignanam.

== Cast ==
- Sivakumar as Ravi
- Kamal Haasan as Kumar
- Jayachitra
- Sripriya
- V. K. Ramasamy
- Thengai Srinivasan
- Manorama
- Mythili
- Vennira Aadai Moorthy
- I. S. R.
- Pushpa
- Shanthi

== Production ==
The film directed by K. Sornam, and story written by Kalaignanam. The final length of the film's prints were 3,925.74 metres (12,879.7 ft) long.

== Soundtrack ==
The music was composed by Shankar–Ganesh, with lyrics by Vaali.

Track listing
| No. | Title | Singer(s) | Length |
|---|---|---|---|
| 1. | "En Kaathali" | S. P. Balasubrahmanyam, K. J. Yesudas |
| 2. | "Puthisaaligal Kathalithargal" | L. R. Anjali, T. M. Soundararajan |
| 3. | "Anthappakkam" | L. R. Anjali, T. Kamala |
| 4. | "Pengalukkendru" | Sasireka, S. P. Balasubrahmanyam |

== Reception ==
Kanthan of Kalki called the story ordinary, but appreciated the direction by Sornam. The film failed at the box-office.
