= Ore Raththam =

1987 film by K. Sornam

- Theatrical release poster
- Directed by: K. Sornam
- Written by: M. Karunanidhi
- Based on: Ore Raththam by M. Karunanidhi
- Produced by: M. Suryanarayanan
- Starring: Karthik; Pandiyan; Radha Ravi; Kishmu; M. K. Stalin; Seetha; Madhuri
- Cinematography: M. S. Annadurai
- Edited by: L. Kesavan
- Music by: Devendran
- Production company: Murasu Movies
- Release date: 8 May 1987
- Country: India
- Language: Tamil

Ore Raththam (pronounced [oɾeː ɾattam] transl. Same Blood) is a 1987 Indian Tamil-language political drama film directed by K. Sornam and written by M. Karunanidhi. The film has an ensemble cast including Karthik, Pandiyan, Radha Ravi, Kishmu, M. K. Stalin (in his acting debut), Seetha and Madhuri. It is based on Karunanidhi's novel of the same name which was serialised in the magazine Kungumam. The film was released on 8 May 1987 and did not perform well at the box office.

== Cast ==
- Karthik as Magesh
- Pandiyan as Ponnan
- Radha Ravi
- Kishmu as the rigid religionist
- M. K. Stalin as Nandhakumar
- Seetha as Kamatchi
- Madhuri
- K. K. Soundar
- M. R. Krishnamurthy
- Chinni Jayanth
- C. I. D. Sakunthala
- Bhagyalakshmi as Merry
- Manorama as Parvathi

== Production ==
Ore Raththam was a story which was serialised in the magazine Kungumam. The author M. Karunanidhi adapted it for the screen with the same title. His son Stalin made his cinematic acting debut with this film.

== Soundtrack ==
The soundtrack was composed by Devendran.

Track listing
No.	Title	Singer(s)	Length
1.	"Ore Raththam Than Oduthu"	Devendran	4:08
2.	"Oru Poralien Payanam Idu"	Devendran	3:11
Total length:			7:19

== Release and reception ==
Ore Raththam was released on 8 May 1987. N. Krishnaswamy of The Indian Express liked the film because "most of the characters get a say, the focus shifts to each of them one time or another". He also praised the narration, dialogue, background score, camera work, and editing. Jayamanmadhan of Kalki felt that Karunanidhi wrote this script seemed like not go towards political area and also felt the song sequences and method of storytelling has outdated feel, citing director Sornam was in huge slumber then woke up suddenly and went to the sets and concluded saying if the film was ended showing Kishmu's character as reformed than dying it would have been a propaganda play preaching life education. The film did not perform well at the box office.
