= Chiranjeevi (1985 film) =

- Theatrical release poster
- Directed by: C. V. Rajendran
- Produced by: K. Lakshmi Narayana; K. V. Rama Rao
- Starring: Chiranjeevi; Vijayashanti; Bhanupriya; Kaikala Satyanarayana; Murali Mohan
- Music by: K. Chakravarthy
- Production company: Ajay Creations
- Release date: April 18, 1985
- Country: India
- Language: Telugu

Chiranjeevi is a Tollywood film which released on 18 April 1985. This film was directed by C. V. Rajendran. This film stars Chiranjeevi in the titular role. The film was a remake of director's own 1984 Kannada film Naane Raja.

== Plot ==
The story revolves around a man, Chiranjeevi (Chiranjeevi), who is the son of a sincere Police officer (Kaikala Satyanarayana). Chiranjeevi's mother dies in his childhood, and his father brings him up. Chiranjeevi admires his dad very much and his weakness is he cannot tolerate anyone talking ill about his father. He falls in love with Lalitha (Vijayashanti) and expresses his love. Bhanupriya plays as Shanthi, the blind sister of Vijayashanti, and Venu (Murali Mohan) is her lover. In a bank robbery, a thief hides money in Murali Mohan's bag. Vijayashanti accuses Chiranjeevi's father of wrongfully arresting Murali Mohan. She requests Chiranjeevi to help her, but their argument leads him to anger, and he hits her. Vijayshanti dies on the spot. What follows next is a series of murders that Chiranjeevi commits in his attempt at hiding the accidental death caused by him, as he does not want to fall lower in the eyes of his father. The movie ends when his father kills Chiranjeevi.

== Cast ==
- Chiranjeevi as Chiranjeevi
- Vijayashanti as Lalitha, Chiranjeevi's lover
- Bhanupriya as Shanti, Vijayashanti's blind sister
- Kaikala Satyanarayana as Commissioner Narayana Rao, Chiranjeevi's father
- Murali Mohan as Venu, Bhanupriya's lover
- Ranganath as Kumar
- Nutan Prasad as Pala Ramudu
- Suthi Veerabhadra Rao as Thirupathayya
- Suthi Velu as Chitti
- Bheemaraju as Head of Eagles gang
