= Jagathalaprathapan (1990 film) =

1990 film by Sankar Ganesh

- DVD cover
- Directed by: Shankar–Ganesh
- Screenplay by: Shankar–Ganesh
- Story by: Kanmani Subbu
- Produced by: C. Murugan
- Starring: Mohan; Rakhi Sri; Divya
- Cinematography: K. B. Dhayalan
- Edited by: T. Thirunavukkarasu
- Music by: Shankar–Ganesh
- Production company: Rani Cine Arts
- Release date: 17 March 1990
- Running time: 140 minutes
- Country: India
- Language: Tamil

Jagathalaprathapan is a 1990 Indian Tamil-language crime film directed by composers Shankar–Ganesh in their directorial debut and their only film directed. The film stars Mohan, Rakhi Sri and Divya. The film, produced by C. Murugan, was released on 17 March 1990.

== Cast ==
- Mohan as Prathap
- Rakhi Sri as Nandhini
- Divya as Vidya
- S. S. Chandran
- Senthil as Kittu
- Charle as Sri
- Kitty as Subash
- R. Sarathkumar as Dileep
- Kovai Sarala
- M. N. Nambiar as John Frederick
- Omakuchi Narasimhan
- Anuja
- Sribala
- Bhanu
- Nandhakumar
- Kanmani Subbu
- Gundu Kalyanam
- Radha in a guest appearance
- Shankar–Ganesh in a cameo appearance

== Soundtrack ==
The soundtrack was composed by Shankar–Ganesh.

Song	Singer(s)	Lyrics	Duration
"Kuyya Kuyya Maane"	Mano, Suja Radhakrishnan	Vaali	5:50
"Moru Thaana Gramathula"	Mano, K. S. Chithra	Vaali	4:55
"Naanthaane Yengugiraen"	K. S. Chithra	Shankar–Ganesh	4:40
"Pullimaane Pullimaane"	S. P. Balasubrahmanyam, K. S. Chithra	Vairamuthu	4:32
"Vaadi Amma Maariamma"	Malaysia Vasudevan, P. Susheela, Sakthi Shanmugam	Vaali	6:38
