= Ullathil Kuzhanthaiyadi =

- Directed by: K. S. Gopalakrishnan
- Screenplay by: K. S. Gopalakrishnan
- Story by: Poovai Krishnan
- Produced by: K. S. Sabarinathan
- Starring: Jaishankar; Sripriya; Thengai Srinivasan
- Cinematography: Dutt
- Edited by: Devan
- Music by: Shankar–Ganesh
- Production company: A. C. V. Combines
- Release date: 25 February 1978
- Country: India
- Language: Tamil

Ullathil Kuzhanthaiyadi (transl. A child at heart) is a 1978 Indian Tamil-language film written and directed by K. S. Gopalakrishnan from a story by Poovai Krishnan, starring Jaishankar and Sripriya. It was released on 25 February 1978. The trade considered it a success, although Sripriya did not.

== Cast ==
- Jaishankar as Mari
- Sripriya as Pappa
- Thengai Srinivasan as Madurai
- Prameela as Muniamma
- S. A. Ashokan
- Kannan
- P. R. Varalakshmi
- V. R. Thilagam

== Soundtrack ==
The music was composed by Shankar–Ganesh, with lyrics by A. Maruthakasi.

Track listing
| No. | Title | Singer(s) | Length |
|---|---|---|---|
| 1. | "Kannalam Kattame" | Vani Jairam | 3:22 |
| 2. | "Mammattiya Kaiyile Thookki" | S. Janaki | 3:15 |
| 3. | "Kannukku Nee Oru" | Sirkazhi Govindarajan, Vani Jairam | 4:35 |
| Total length: | | | 11:12 |

== Reception ==
Free India appreciated Gopalakrishnan for "deftly" directing the film, his "down to earth" dialogues and some of the cast performances, though Prameela was "stagy" in some sequences. A writer for London Murasu appreciated the performances of Jaishankar and Sripriya, but criticised Ashokan's performance and much of Gopalakrishnan's dialogues.
