= Mela Thalangal =

- VCD cover
- Directed by: K. Sornam
- Screenplay by: K. Sornam
- Story by: Thooyavan
- Produced by: S. N. S. Thirumal
- Starring: Jaishankar; Sripriya
- Cinematography: Rajagopal
- Edited by: Bhaskar
- Music by: Ramesh Naidu
- Production company: Ashtalakshmi Pictures
- Release date: 8 December 1978
- Running time: 130 minutes
- Country: India
- Language: Tamil

Mela Thalangal is a 1978 Indian Tamil-language film directed by K. Sornam. The film stars Jaishankar and Sripriya, with M. R. Radha, R. S. Manohar and S. A. Ashokan in supporting roles. It was released on 8 December 1978 and became success.

== Cast ==
- Jaishankar as Amarnath
- Sripriya
- M. R. Radha Inspector Viswanath
- R. S. Manohar as Jambu
- S. A. Ashokan as Varadarajan
- K. Kannan as Boopathy
- Suruli Rajan
- V. Gopalakrishnan
- I. S. R.
- P. R. Varalakshmi

== Soundtrack ==
The music was composed by Ramesh Naidu.

Track listing
No.	Title	Singer(s)	Length
1.	"Yenadhu Vilasam"	S. P. Balasubrahmanyam, S. Janaki
2.	"Thalathalakkuthu"	Vani Jairam
3.	"Sendoora Pottu"	Malaysia Vasudevan, S. Janaki
4.	"Anandha Veenai"	S. P. Balasubrahmanyam, P. Susheela

== Release and reception ==
Mela Thalangal was released on 8 December 1978, having been delayed from November. Kausikan of Kalki appreciated the film's cinematography and colour sequences.
