= Naane Varuven (1992 film) =

- Poster
- Directed by: Sripriya
- Screenplay by: Sripriya
- Story by: Mrs. Meenakshi
- Produced by: Girija
- Starring: Rahman; Sripriya
- Cinematography: K. B. Dhayalan; Prashanth Babu (Director of Cinematography)
- Edited by: M. Vellaisami
- Music by: Shankar–Ganesh
- Production company: Sree Chamundieswari
- Distributed by: Sree Janani Enterprises
- Release date: 27 February 1992
- Running time: 135 minutes
- Country: India
- Language: Tamil

Naane Varuven (transl. I myself will come) is a 1992 Indian Tamil language film, directed by Sripriya and produced by Girija. The film stars Rahman and Sripriya, with Rajani, Vagai Chandrasekhar, Vadivukkarasi, Gautami and Radhika in supporting roles. It is a spiritual sequel to the 1979 film Neeya?. The film was released on 27 February 1992.

== Plot ==
Story of Naga Rani is an Ichchadhari Snake. Naga Rani realises that she was wrong and that her revenge destroyed many lives just like her own life was destroyed. Her husband, who had been killed in Neeya, now taken rebirth in form of Raja.

Right from childhood, he had been out of town and he came to native and plans to marry his sweetheart Priya. Dr.Radhika and Priya having known the attempts made by the Nagarani, tries to save Raja.

Nagarani need to consummate with Raja so as to regain her husband, which was prevented by Priya with the aid of Dr.Radhika.

However, Nagarani mocks them by taking appearance of Priya consummates, before Priya and Doctor arrives.

== Cast ==
- Rahman as Raja
- Sripriya as Naga Rani
- Sasikala as Priya
- Vagai Chandrasekhar as Sathya
- Vadivukkarasi as Lakshmi
- Gautami as Thangam
- Radhika as Dr. Radhika
- R. S. Manohar as Saint, Guest Appearance
- Chinni Jayanth as Saint Assistant
- S. S. Chandran as Saint Assistant
- P. R. Varalakshmi as Sathya's mother
- Gokila as Gypsy
- Ramya Krishnan as Cameo Appearance

== Soundtrack ==
Music was composed by Shankar–Ganesh.

Songs	Singers	Lyrics	Length
"Orey Jeevan Ondre"	S. P. Balasubrahmanyam K. S. Chithra	Panchu Arunachalam	05:05
"Pachamala Pennu Naan"	K. S. Chithra	Vaali	04:51
"Pogathey Ennai Thandi"	K. S. Chithra	Vaali	04:41
"Orey Jeevan Ondre" – Female	K. S. Chithra	Panju Arunachalam	04:59
"Ketenamma"	S. P. Balasubrahmanyam, K. S. Chithra	Vaali	04:06
"Arambam Aagattum"	S. P. Balasubrahmanyam, K. S. Chithra	Vaali	05:03

== Reception ==
N. Krishnaswamy of The Indian Express wrote, "Though the plot moves like that of a mythological film for some time, it leaves that track and builds on excellent technical values (camera: Prasad Babu), background score (Shanker Ganesh) and screenplay (Sripriya) to enhance the dramatic highs of the script."
