= Sangili (1982 film) =

1982 film by C. V. Rajendran

- Theatrical release poster
- Directed by: C. V. Rajendran
- Screenplay by: A. L. Narayanan
- Story by: Subhash Ghai
- Produced by: S. D. Gunasekaran
- Starring: Sivaji Ganesan; Prabhu; Sripriya; M. N. Nambiar
- Cinematography: T. S. Vinayagam
- Edited by: B. Kandhasamy
- Music by: M. S. Viswanathan
- Production company: Arun Sujatha Combines
- Release date: 14 April 1982
- Country: India
- Language: Tamil

Sangili (transl. Chain) is a 1982 Indian Tamil-language action drama film, directed by C. V. Rajendran and produced by S. D. Gunasekaran. The film stars Sivaji Ganesan, Prabhu (in his debut film appearance), Sripriya, Major Sundarrajan, Sumithra and M. N. Nambiar. It is a remake of the 1976 Hindi film Kalicharan. The film was released on 14 April 1982.

== Plot ==
Inspector-General Sivaraj appoints his son and fellow police officer, the talented and steadfast DSP Saravanan Sivaraj as the Special Officer in-charge of tracking down a virulent, anti-national smuggling ring. Saravanan is a widower with two kids who are being raised by his sister Ganga. When Saravanan gets some firm clues that a reputed local businessman and philanthropist 'Lion' Dayanidhi could be the kingpin behind the cartel, Dayanidhi has him killed by one of his henchmen. Soon after, a distraught Sivaraj, who is desperate to find those behind his son's murder, is introduced by a retired jail superintendent friend to a ferocious criminal lodged in Vellore prison named Sangili who remarkably resembles his son Saravanan in appearance.

Sivaraj decides to reform and train the brutish Sangili to impersonate Saravanan in order to trace those behind Saravanan's death. Sivaraj finds transforming Sangili a seemingly impossible task as Sangili refuses to mend his ways and has his own agenda of seeking revenge against his sister's murderer but eventually succeeds with some help from Ganga and Saravanan's kids. Sangili, now transposing as DSP Saravanan, launches himself into tracking the real Saravanan's killer and bringing down the smuggling cartel. Alongside, he also falls in love with Ganga's friend Anandhi and befriends a local don named Rajali who offers to help him in need.

Just before his death, Saravanan had scribbled the word 'No17' on a doctor's prescription pad to help identify his killer and Sangili pursues the clue diligently but in vain. While attending a New Year's Eve party hosted by Sivaraj's friend 'Lion' Dayanidhi, Sangili stumbles on to the fact that they had been misreading the clue upside down and Saravanan had actually scribbled the word 'Lion' to implicate Dayanidhi. Sangili soon confronts Dayanidhi on his own as Sivaraj refuses to believe his assertions about Dayanidhi's criminal antecedents. He also encounters his sister's murderer as one of Dayanidhi's associates and gets the opportunity to avenge her death as well, but Dayanidhi becomes aware of Sangili's real identity through his associate and is ready for his moves.

== Cast ==
- Sivaji Ganesan as DSP Saravanan Sivaraj / Sangili
- Prabhu as Rajali
- Sripriya as Anandhi
- M. N. Nambiar as Tiger Dayanidhi / LION, leader of a smuggling ring
- Major Sundarrajan as IGP Sivaraj
- Sumithra as Ganga
- R. S. Manohar as Veeraiah
- Suruli Rajan
- Vennira Aadai Moorthy
- V. S. Raghavan
- Y. G. Mahendra
- Manorama
- Ceylon Manohar as Mangal Singh
- Manik Irani as Hukum Singh
- Roja Ramani
- S. N. Lakshmi

== Production ==
The film marked the cinematic acting debut of Prabhu, son of Sivaji Ganesan. Ganesan was initially against Prabhu acting in the film as he wanted him to join the police. Prabhu too was not initially interested in pursuing an acting career, but Rajendran insisted him to act in the film.

== Soundtrack ==
Soundtrack was composed by M. S. Viswanathan, with lyrics by Kannadasan.

Track listing
No.	Title	Singer(s)	Length
1.	"Nallorgal Vaazhvai"	T. M. Soundararajan
2.	"Ezhu Kadal"	S. P. Sailaja, B. S. Sasirekha
3.	"Malai Roja"	S. Janaki
4.	"Moga Veenai"	T. M. Soundararajan, Vani Jairam

== Release and reception ==
Sangili was released on 14 April 1982. Kalki negatively reviewed the film, comparing it unfavourably to the original and said the remake looked hastily made.
