= 22 Female Kottayam =

2012 Indian Malayalam-language thriller film

- Promotional poster
- Directed by: Aashiq Abu
- Written by: Abhilash S. Kumar; Syam Pushkaran
- Produced by: O. G. Sunil
- Starring: Rima Kallingal; Fahadh Faasil
- Cinematography: Shyju Khalid
- Edited by: Vivek Harshan
- Music by: Bijibal; Rex Vijayan; Avial
- Production company: Film Brewery
- Distributed by: PJ Entertainments Europe
- Release date: 13 April 2012
- Running time: 122 minutes
- Country: India
- Language: Malayalam
- Budget: ₹2.5 crore (US$260,000)
- Box office: ₹5.2 crore (US$540,000)

22 Female Kottayam, also known as 22FK, is a 2012 Indian Malayalam-language thriller film directed by Aashiq Abu. Written by Syam Pushkaran and Abhilash S. Kumar. The film stars Rima Kallingal and Fahadh Faasil. It was set and filmed in Bengaluru. It was later remade in Tamil as Malini 22 Palayamkottai and in Telugu as Ghatana.

It released on 13 April 2012, and received positive reviews from critics. It was also well received at the box-office.

== Plot ==
Tessa is a nursing student in Bengaluru with plans of traveling to Canada for a career. She meets Cyril, a travel agency worker, when she is setting up her visa. They fall in love and start living together. Tessa loves him with all her heart and takes their relationship and cohabitation seriously.

One day while at a pub, a guy misbehaves with Tessa and Cyril beats him up badly. The guy tries to take revenge on Cyril and searches for him. Cyril goes into hiding with the help of his friend Hegde. Hegde arrives at Cyril's home to inform Tessa about the situation. Then he asks her plainly "Can I have sex with you?" Though Tessa disagrees she is beaten up and forced to the bed. She gets raped that day. Cyril becomes violent and wants to kill Hegde. Tessa calms him down saying that she does not want to make the incident worse than it is; she instead wants to get to Canada at the earliest. Once Tessa recovers from her injuries, Hegde visits her again to ask for forgiveness. He comes while Cyril is not around and finds her in injury. He then rapes her again and leaves her. Tessa decides not to travel abroad and plans to murder Hegde.

Cyril discusses the situation with his boss who suggests killing Tessa and appoints Cyril to do it. Cyril traps her by putting some drugs in her bag. The police arrest Tessa and she is imprisoned. While Tessa calls out for help, she finds Cyril simply walking away from her, which is when she realizes Cyril set her up. Cyril relocates to Cochin and runs a modeling agency. While in prison Tessa meets Zubeida who is sentenced for murder. Through Zubeida's criminal world connections Tessa realizes that Cyril is a known pimp and was cheating her along with the support of his boss Hegde. Zubeida and Tessa bond well with each other, and Zubeida molds a criminal mindset within her for the strength and courage needed to strike back at Cyril and Hegde.

When the court sets her free, Tessa with the help of DK kills Hegde by poisoning him with a cobra. Next, she arrives in Cochin as a femme fatale in search of Cyril while pretending to be a model. Later one night Tessa hooks up with Cyril in his studio. Cyril who had recognized her earlier reveals it and angrily berates her. He beats her and abuses her by calling her a "slut who does any 'adjustment' to flourish her career" for stopping her further being a menace to him. But his frustration dissolves slowly as he wants to enjoy her company. She reminds him she is a mere woman.

But at night Tessa executes her revenge plan and sedates Cyril and surgically cuts off his penis. When he regains consciousness she tells him that she has removed his male organ through surgery. While Cyril finds himself in intense pain and bound to his bed, she taunts him to make him realize his faults and the gross wrongs he committed to her and rationalizes her crime.

Tessa tells Cyril that she knows that she is still somewhere in his heart. She reminds him that she has only lost someone who cheated on her, whereas he lost someone who genuinely loved him. Now Cyril is stunned that he is not even able to face Tessa. Cyril recollects that her love was true and his love was overshadowed by his male supremacy concept and greed for wealth. Over the days he admits his actions that caused her pain. Then Tessa leaves him but not before inviting him to settle the score with her, if any remains there. Cyril accepts the challenge of a true criminal as he is and taunts her that he will confront her when he is ready, most probably knowing that he has to settle the score with her in terms of true love with roots in violence. Tessa leaves for Canada, dismantles her cell phone, and cuts further contact with DK.

== Cast ==
- Rima Kallingal as Tessa K. Abraham
- Fahadh Faasil as Cyril C. Mathew
- Pratap K. Pothen as Hegde
- Riya Saira as Tissa K. Abraham
- T. G. Ravi as Ravi
- Sathaar as DK
- Resmi Sateesh as Zubeida
- Srinda Ashab as Jincy
- Vijay Babu as Benny
- Dileesh Pothan as Advocate
- Sreenath Bhasi as Bony
- Sandeep Narayanan as the Doctor in the jail

== Music ==
22 Female Kottayam

Soundtrack album by Rex Vijayan and Bijibal
- Released: 18 February 2012
- Genre: Film soundtrack
- Length: 22:44
- Language: Malayalam
- Label: Manorama Music
- Producers: Rex Vijayan; Bijibal

Rex Vijayan chronology
Chaappa Kurishu (2011)	22 Female Kottayam (2012)	English: An Autumn in London (2013)

Bijibal chronology
Venicile Vyaapari (2011)	22 Female Kottayam (2012)	Ozhimuri (2012)

The songs and score are composed by Bijibal and Rex Vijayan. The soundtrack album also consists of a title track Chillaane by Indian alternative rock band Avial.

22 Female Kottayam
No.	Title	Lyrics	Music	Singer(s)	Length
1.	"Chillaane"	R. Venugopal	Avial	Tony, Neha Nair	3:50
2.	"Melle Kollum"	R. Venugopal	Rex Vijayan	Job Kurian, Neha Nair	4:36
3.	"Neeyo"	Rafeeq Ahammed	Bijibal	Bijibal, Neha Nair	3:25
4.	"Melle Kollum (Aalaps)"	R. Venugopal	Rex Vijayan	Job Kurien, Neha Nair	5:24
5.	"Chillaane (Remix Version)"	R. Venugopal	Avial	Tony, Neha Nair	5:29
Total length:					22:44

== Production ==
Ashik says that the concept of the film was in his mind for many years. "This concept was there in my mind when I was working on my maiden venture, Daddy Cool. It stayed in my mind and I wanted to take it up at some point. I got the confidence to go ahead with the subject after the success of Salt N' Pepper. This one is not the usual kind of storyline that will appeal to all producers. There is a certain amount of risk in it." After the success of Salt N' Pepper, Ashik announced his next film Idukki Gold. During the pre-production, Abu put the project on hold and started the work of 22 Female Kottayam. The film was scripted by debutant writer Abhilash Kumar along with Shyam Pushkaran of Salt N' Pepper fame. Kumar had worked with Ashik in Daddy Cool and Salt 'N Pepper as an assistant director. Kumar says the story is loosely based on real-life stories about young women who move out of Kerala to Hyderabad, Orissa and Bengaluru in search of nursing jobs to eventually go abroad. The production controller of 22 Female Kottayam is Shibu G Suseelan.

22FK started production in December 2011 and was mostly filmed from Bengaluru. Shyju Khalid wielded the camera. He says that the film, which was shot on a multi-camera, was a big challenge for him. "It is a thriller-cum-romance movie. In the first half, there is romance and suddenly a rape scene, so I had to add a lot of grays to give that effect. And, the climax was the most challenging part, as it’s very dramatic and I had to add the proper effect to retain the mood. Here, the subject was a little dark so I could experiment, but in normal movies you can’t do much of an experiment. Also, you have to keep in mind the taste of Malayalis," says Khalid.

== Critical reception ==
22 Female Kottayam received positive critical response upon its release.

The Times of India rated it 3 out of 5 stars, concluding that "The film has a theme as old as the Kannaki myth but comes nowhere near in terms of inspiration." One India commented that "22 Female Kottayam is like a fresh whiff of breeze" and concluded the review by adding, "Cheers for director Ashik for experimenting with such a novel and path breaking plot." Rediff also rated the film 3 out of 5 star praising the direction of Ashik by saying "Ashik adds a distinct style to his direction with 22 Female Kottayam." Sify rated it as good and said that "22 Female Kottayam may be far from perfect, but it is a movie in the right direction. Such efforts should be well appreciated, as it is a step that leads to better cinema." NowRunning rated the film 3/5 and said "Big hugs, Mr. Abu for gifting us with this fighter female, 22 years old, from Kottayam. And an extra big hug for not parading her as a virgin." Metro Matinee rated film as "Excellent" and said "Ashik's 22FK is a refreshing theme with superb execution."

== Box office ==
22 FK is one of the low budget hits of 2012. The film made at a budget of ₹2.5 crore grossed ₹5.2 crore at the box office.

== Awards and nominations ==
Kerala State Film Awards(2012)

- Best Actress-Rima Kallingal
- Best Supporting Actor-Fahadh Faasil

Asiavision Movie Awards (2012)

- Best Actress - Rima Kallingal
- Performer of the Year - Fahadh Faasil

Filmfare Awards South (2013)

- Best Actor - Fahadh Faasil
- Best Actress - Rima Kallingal
- Best Film - 22 Female Kottayam (Nominated)
- Best Director - Aashiq Abu (Nominated)
- Best Supporting Actress - Rashmi Satheesh (Nominated)

== Remakes ==
The film was remade into Tamil and Telugu as Malini 22 Palayamkottai (2014) and Ghatana (2016) with Nithya Menen and Krish J. Sathaar playing the lead roles in both versions.
