= Enga Ooru Aattukkaran =

- Directed by: Sripriya
- Written by: S. S. Manian (dialogues)
- Screenplay by: Sripriya
- Produced by: V. Jayaraman
- Starring: Chandrakanth; Sripriya
- Cinematography: K. B. Dhalayan
- Edited by: S. Sankar
- Music by: Yuvaraj
- Production company: Yamini Cine Arts
- Release date: 11 August 1990
- Country: India
- Language: Tamil

Enga Ooru Aattukkaran (transl. The goatherd of our village) is a 1990 Indian Tamil-language film directed by Sripriya, starring her brother Chandrakanth as the protagonist and herself as the antagonist. It was released on 11 August 1990.

== Plot ==
A villager and a rich man's educated daughter clash after the former is insulted by the latter, but eventually fall in love.

== Cast ==
- Chandrakanth as the villager
- Sripriya as the village playboy's concubine
- Kanaka as the rich man's educated daughter
- Rajeev as the village playboy

== Soundtrack ==
The music was composed by Yuvaraj.

== Reception ==
N. Krishnaswamy of The Indian Express criticised the film's concept of giving importance to the goat and having it have a flashback scene while also criticising the film's camerawork and music.
