= Shankar–Ganesh =

Indian music director duo

- Shankar

Background information
- Origin: Chinthamani, Tenkasi(Dt) Chennai, India
- Genre: Film score
- Occupations: Film composers, Music directors, singers
- Instrument: Keyboard
- Years active: 1967–present
- Members: Ganesh

Shankar–Ganesh is an Indian music director duo who has worked on Tamil, Kannada, Malayalam, and Telugu movies for around 50 years. They also directed one movie Jagathalaprathapan in 1990. Despite Shankar's death, Ganesh continued using the name.

== Personal life ==
Shankar was the younger brother of music director C. R. Subbaraman while Ganesh was the son-in-law of G. N. Velumani who produced films like Bhaagapirivinai and Paalum Pazhamum.

== Career ==
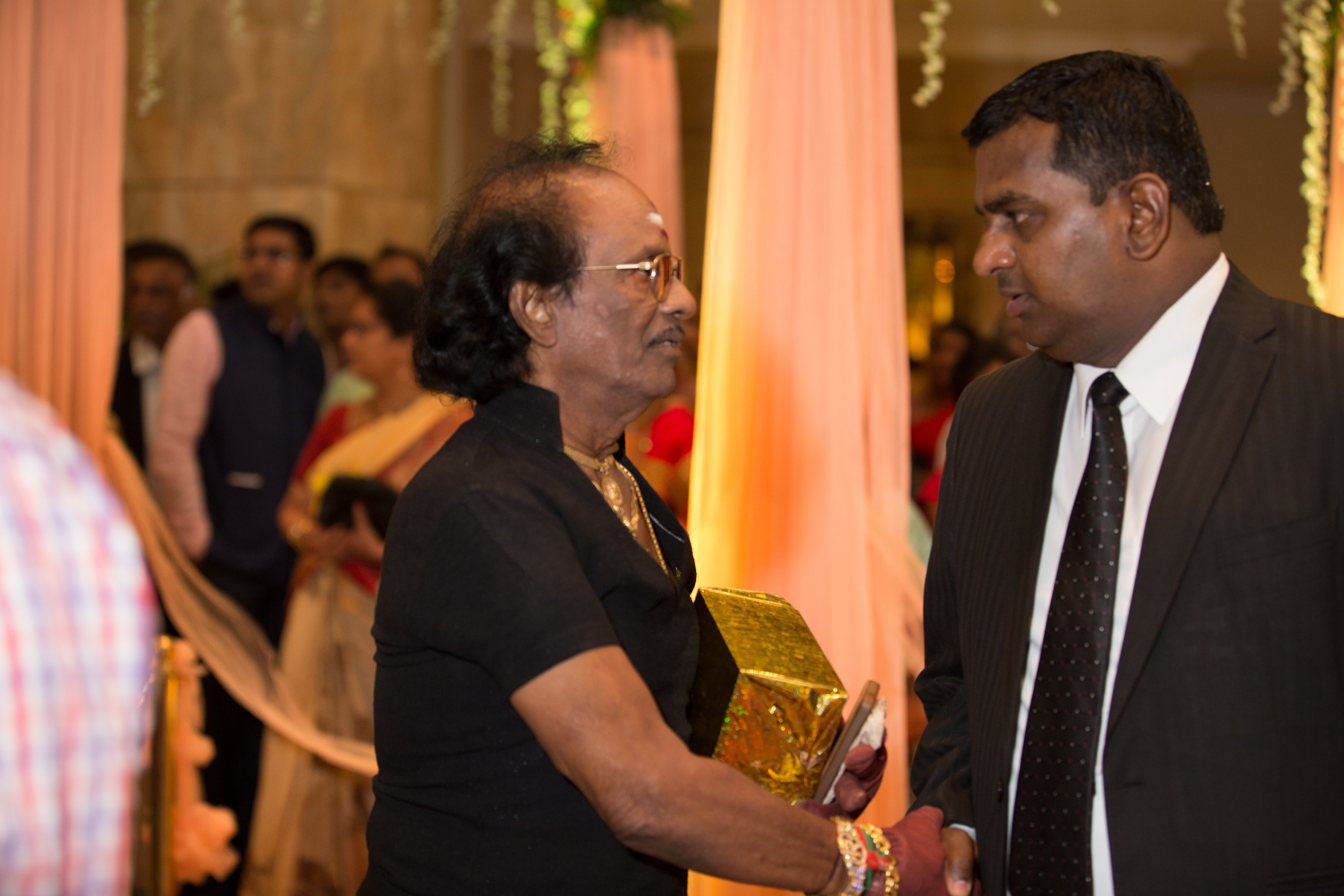
Ganesh (left), in May 2018

They started as assistants to Tamil music composers M. S. Viswanathan and T. K. Ramamoorthy in 1964 and later the duo assisted M.S.Viswanathan alone from 1965 till 1967. When Shankar Ganesh were composing for a stage play titled "Paadi Parandha Kuyil", Kannadhasan started his own film titled "Nagarathil Thirudargal" in which he introduced Shankar Ganesh as music directors. However that film was stopped, so Kannadhasan took them to Chinnappa Devar and requested him to give them a chance thus making their debut with Magaraasi. After Kannadhasan's death, Shankar Ganesh had their titles changed to " Kavinger vazhangiya thevarin" Shankar Ganesh.

Kaveri Thanda Kalaiselvi was a Natya Nadagam (Dance Drama) wherein Jayalalitha was main lead and rehearsals used to happen at her house with all artistes and musicians coming to her house and doing practice. Shankaraman, musician duo Shankar and Ganesh used to come to play music. Sandhya used to make food and give all artistes breakfast and lunch. This went on for 28 days before the first show happened in 1965. After Jayalalitha became a huge star she recommended Devar Films to give musician duo Shankar Ganesh their debut film as a music director in the film Maharasi starring Ravinchandran with Jayalalitha.

Their first independent release was Magaraasi in 1967. Aattukara Alamelu was a turning point in their career. Musician duo Shankar Ganesh composed music for 2 films of Jayalalitha – Maharasi in 1967 produced by Devar Films and Vandhale Maharasi in 1973 directed by K.S.Gopalakrishnan. Their best known composition were in Naan Yen Pirenden and Idhaya Veenai.

== Bomb blast ==
On 17 November 1986, Ganesh received an anonymous parcel by post. It contained a tape recorder with a note from the sender saying that the parcel contained a cassette with some ‘new’ music and if Ganesh liked it, he should give the sender a "break" into films. As Ganesh pressed the play button, the tape recorder exploded in his face, injuring his hands and eyes. Plastic surgery restored his hands and allowed him to play the keyboard, but he lost his vision in his right eye and had blurred vision in the left. On 1 June 2014, his vision was restored by a "glued intra ocular lens" technique.

He was also performing on the stage 50 meters away at the Congress rally in Sriperumbudur on 21 May 1991, when a human bomb killed Rajiv Gandhi.

== Personal life ==
Shankar from the duo died prematurely, while Ganesh continued take the band forward with the name Shankar–Ganesh, and has often been credited simply as Shankar Ganesh himself. Shankar's son Balasubramaniam "Bobby" Shankar made his debut as a music composer through Chinni Jayanth's romantic drama film, Unakkaga Mattum (2000). Ganesh's son Shreekumar, became an actor, and later married actress Shamitha, who starred in Pandavar Bhoomi (2001).

== Discography ==
=== Tamil films ===
Year	Film	Notes
1967	Magaraasi	Debut Film
1967	Naan Yaar Theriyuma	
1968	Siritha Mugam	
1969	Akka Thangai	
1970	Maanavan	
1970	Kalam Vellum	
1970	Kannan Varuvan	
1971	Deivam Pesuma	
1971	Kettikaran	
1971	Then Kinnam	
1972	Ganga	
1972	Thaikku Oru Pillai	
1972	Naan Yen Pirandhen	
1972	Kannamma	
1972	Savalukku Savaal	
1972	Varaverpu	
1972	Puguntha Veedu	
1972	Idhaya Veenai	
1972	Ponmagal Vandhal	
1973	Manjal Kungumam	
1973	Vandhaale Magaraasi	
1973	Amman Arul	
1973	Kasi Yathirai	
1973	Dheiva Vamsam	
1973	Iraivan Irukkindran	25th Film
1973	Komatha En Kulamatha	
1973	Veettukku Vandha Marumagal	
1973	Vakkuruthi	
1973	Nathaiyil Muthu	
1974	Kai Niraya Kaasu	
1974	Vellikizhamai Viratham	
1974	Doctoramma	
1974	Ore Satchi	
1974	Pathu Madha Bandham	
1974	Sorgathil Thirumanam	
1974	Devi Sri Karumari Amman	
1974	Pandhattam	
1974	Pudhiya Manidhan	
1975	Anbu Roja	
1975	Enga Pattan Sothu	
1975	Cinema Paithiyam	
1975	Pinju Manam	
1975	Panam Pathum Seyum	
1975	Thangathile Vairam	
1975	Pattikkaattu Raja	
1975	Oru Kudumbathin Kadhai	
1976	Ore Thanthai	
1977	Aattukara Alamelu	
1978	Karunai Ullam	50th Film
1978	Ullathil Kuzhanthaiyadi	
1978	Chinna Chinna Veedu Katti	
1978	Thaai Meethu Sathiyam	
1978	Palabishegam	
1978	Uravugal Endrum Vazhga	
1979	Inikkum Ilamai	
1979	Thaayillamal Naan Illai	
1979	Neeya?	
1979	Ennadi Meenakshi	
1979	Kanni Paruvathile	
1979	Pasi	
1980	Othayadi Paathayilae	
1980	Kannil Theriyum Kathaikal	composed one song "Naan Unna Nenachen"
1980	Dhinamthorum Deepavali	
1980	Vandichakkaram	
1980	Kumari Pennin Ullathile	75th Film
1980	Natchathiram	
1980	Nijangal Nilaikkindrana	
1980	Ponnagaram	
1980	Maria My Darling	
1981	Veli Thaandiya Vellaadu	
1981	Anjatha Nenjangal	
1981	Aani Ver	
1981	Jadhikkoru Needhi	
1981	Chinna Mul Periya Mul	
1981	Kanneer Pookkal	
1981	Needhi Pizhaithathu	
1981	Sattam Oru Iruttarai	
1981	Palaivana Solai	
1981	Sivappu Malli	
1981	Arthangal Aayiram	
1982	Darling, Darling, Darling	
1982	Pakkathu Veetu Roja	
1982	Nenjile Thunivirunthal	
1982	Amma	
1982	Neram Vandhachu	100th Film
1982	Mamiyara Marumagala	
1982	Ilanjodigal	
1982	Adhisayappiravigal	
1982	Auto Raja	
1982	Ayiram Muthangal	
1982	Kalyana Kalam	
1982	Kanalukku Karaiyethu	
1982	Krodham	
1982	Nenjangal	
1982	Oorum Uravum	
1982	Moondru Mugam	
1982	Pattanathu Rajakkal	
1982	Poi Satchi	
1982	Theerpugal Thiruththapadalam	
1982	Thooku Medai	
1982	Thunai	
1982	Ranga	
1983	Alai Payum Nenjangal	
1983	En Aasai Unnoduthan	
1983	Anal Kaatru	125th Film
1983	Thai Veedu	
1983	Dhooram Adhighamillai	
1983	Nenjamellam Neeye	
1984	Vaanga Mappillai Vaanga	Film unreleased One song "Ennadi Muniyamma" was later remixed by D. Imman in Vathiyar (2006)
1984	Ninaivugal	
1984	Nandri	
1984	Niraparaadhi	
1984	Osai	
1984	Madras Vathiyar	
1984	Vai Pandal	
1984	Vetri	
1984	Pournami Alaigal	
1985	Naagam	
1985	Chavi	
1985	Avan	
1985	Santhosha Kanavukal	
1985	Anthasthu	
1985	Bandham	
1985	Poi Mugangal	
1985	Chain Jayapal	
1985	Chidambara Rahasiyam	
1985	Engirunthalum Vazhga	150th Film
1985	Ilamai	
1985	Kutravaaligal	
1985	Needhiyin Nizhal	
1985	Uthami	
1985	Veli	
1985	Mangamma Sabatham	
1986	Aayiram Kannudayaal	
1986	Anandha Kanneer	
1986	Piranthaen Valarnthen	
1986	Kulirkaala Megangal	
1986	Paadum Vaanampadi	
1986	Panneer Nadhigal	175th Film
1986	Mounam Kalaikirathu	
1986	Kaalam	
1986	Samsaram Adhu Minsaram	
1987	Anbulla Appa	
1987	Anjatha Singam	
1987	Enga Chinna Rasa	
1987	Raja Mariyadhai	
1987	Oorkavalan	
1987	Thirumathi Oru Vegumathi	
1987	Veerapandiyan	
1988	Aalay Pathu Malai Mathu	
1988	Mappillai Sir	
1988	Makkal Aanaiyittal	
1988	Sahadevan Mahadevan	
1988	Veedu Manaivi Makkal	
1988	Poo Pootha Nandavanam	
1988	Neruppu Nila	
1988	Vacha Kuri Thappathu	
1988	Sivapputhaali	
1989	En Rathathin Rathame	
1989	Manidhan Marivittan	
1989	Sattathin Thirappu Vizhaa	
1989	Sakalakala Sammandhi	
1989	Nyaya Tharasu	
1989	Manandhal Mahadevan	
1989	Thangamana Purushan	200th Film
1989	Thangamani Ramamani	
1990	Aarathi Edungadi	
1990	Amma Pillai	
1990	Sathan Sollai Thattathe	
1990	Durga	
1990	Sakthi Parasakthi	
1990	Aavathellam Pennale	
1990	Manaivi Oru Manickam	
1990	Sandhana Kaatru	
1990	Vedikkai En Vadikkai	
1990	Idhaya Thamarai	
1990	Varavu Nalla Uravu	
1990	Nalla Kaalam Porandaachu	
1990	Aadi Velli	
1990	Pattikaattaan	225th Film
1990	Vaazhkai Chakkaram	
1990	Vaaliba Vilaiyattu	
1990	Pengal Veettin Kangal	
1990	Jagathalaprathapan	also director
1991	Nallathai Naadu Kekum	
1991	Sendhoora Devi	
1991	Vaakku Moolam	
1991	Eeswari	
1991	Aadi Viratham	
1991	Thai Poosam	
1991	Ayul Kaithi	
1991	Pudhusa Oru Kalyanam	Movie Not Released
1992	Moondram Padi	
1992	Naane Varuven	
1992	Urimai Oonjaladugiradhu	
1992	Deiva Kuzhandhai	
1992	Chinna Poovai Killathey	
1992	Devar Veettu Ponnu	
1992	Sivasankari	250th Film
1992	Madha Komadha	
1992	Harihara Puthran	
1992	Purushan Enakku Arasan	
1993	Paarambariyam	
1993	Sivarathri	
1993	Karpagam Vanthachu	
1994	Vaanga Partner Vaanga	
1995	Mudhal Udhayam	
2006	Mazhaithuli Mazhaithuli	
2006	Theenda Theenda	
2022	Uzhaikkum Kaigal	

=== Kannada films ===
Year	Film	Notes
1980	Maria My Darling	
1980	Rahasya Ratri	
1982	Khadeema Kallaru	
1982	Prema Mathsara	
1983	Chakravyuha	
1983	Dharma Yuddham	
1983	Karune Illada Kanoonu	
1983	Sididedda Sahodara	
1984	Naane Raja	
1984	Shapatha	
1984	Pralayanthaka	
1985	Hosa Itihaasa	
1985	Mareyada Manikya	
1985	Naanu Nanna Hendthi	
1985	Savira Sullu	
1985	Swabhimana	
1985	Karinaga	
1986	Na Ninna Preetisuve	
1986	Tiger	
1986	Asambhava	
1986	Kadinalli Jathre	
1986	Anand	
1987	Agni Kanye	
1987	Vijayothsava	
1988	Samyuktha	Background score only
1988	Prajaprabhutva	
1988	Mathru Vathsalya	
1988	Nee Nanna Daiva	
1988	Bharath	
1989	Ade Raaga Ade Haadu	
1989	Bangarada Baduku	
1989	Hosa Kavya	
1989	Mahayuddha	
1989	Jayabheri	
1990	Tiger Gangu	
1990	Mouna Horata	
1991	Nagini	
1991	Bombay Dada	
1991	Bhairavi	
1992	Mavanige Thakka Aliya	
1993	Vasantha Poornima	
1993	Vikram	
1993	Sidukabeda Singari	
1993	Sambhavi	
1993	Vijaya Kranthi	
1994	Mayor Prabhakar	

=== Malayalam films ===
Year	Film	Notes
1974	Ayalathe Sundari	
1974	Chakravakam	
1976	Chirikkudukka	
1976	Kamadhenu	
1977	Tholkan Enikku Manassilla	
1979	Pennorumbettaal	
1979	Prabhu	
1979	Vijayam Nammude Senani	
1980	Anthappuram	
1980	Chandra Bimbam	
1980	Ival Eevazhi Ithu Vare	
1980	Love in Singapore	
1981	Saahasam	
1981	Sankharsham	
1981	Sphodanam	
1982	Aarambham	
1982	Guha	
1982	Kaalam	
1982	Kazhumaram	
1982	Maattuvin Chattangale	
1982	Paanjajanyam	
1983	Angam	
1983	Bhookambam	
1983	Yudham	
1984	Thirakal	
1985	Aadhiyugam	
1985	Pournami Raavil 3D	
1988	Karate Girls	
1989	Mrugaya	
1989	Chakkikotha Chankaran	

=== Telugu films ===
Year	Film	Notes
1980	Love in Singapore	
1987	Veera Pratap	
1987	Srimathi Oka Bahumathi	
1988	Aadade Aadharam	
1989	Ajatha Satruvu	

== Filmography ==
=== As a director ===
Year	Title	Notes	Ref.
1990	Jagathalaprathapan		

=== As an actor ===
- Othaiyadi Paadhaiyile (1980)
- Sattam Oru Iruttarai (1981)
- Naan Paadum Paadal (1984) as themselves
- Pookkalai Parikkatheergal (1986)
- Namma Ooru Nalla Ooru (1986)
- Neruppu Nila (1988)
- Anbu Kattalai (1989)
- Poovellam Kettupaar (1999)
- Gurusamy (2011)
- Maharani Kottai (2015)
- Unnai Thottu Kolla Vaa (2017)
- Naai Sekar (2022)

== Bibliography ==
- ஆனந்த விகடன் பொக்கிஷம் (in Tamil). Vikatan Publications. 2011. pp. 157–160.
