= Antha (film) =

1981 film by Rajendra Singh Babu

- Poster
- Directed by: Rajendra Singh Babu
- Screenplay by: H. V. Subba Rao; Rajendra Singh Babu
- Based on: Antha by H. K. Anantha Rao
- Produced by: H. N. Maruthi; Venugopal
- Starring: Ambareesh; Lakshmi; Latha
- Cinematography: P. S. Prakash
- Edited by: K. Balu
- Music by: G. K. Venkatesh
- Production company: Parimala Arts
- Distributed by: Amee Films
- Release date: 1981
- Running time: 129 minutes
- Country: India
- Language: Kannada

Antha ( transl. The End) is a 1981 Indian Kannada-language action thriller film directed by Rajendra Singh Babu, based on H. K. Ananth Rao's serialised story of the same name published for the weekly magazine Sudha. The film stars Ambareesh and Lakshmi, while Shakti Prasad, Lakshman, Vajramuni, Tiger Prabhakar, Sundar Krishna Urs appear in supporting roles. The plot revolves around an honest police officer (Ambareesh) who goes on to impersonate his lookalike, a dreaded criminal, to expose the nexus between the underworld and the establishment.

The film was released after a lengthy battle of the makers with the Central Board of Film Certification over a few scenes in the film that allegedly glorified violence. It culminated with the director and producer meeting then Prime Minister Indira Gandhi, a parliamentary debate over the film's release and a subsequent judicial verdict in their favour. The film was met with commercial success. While it is seen as a landmark in Kannada cinema, Ambareesh's performance further strengthened his image as a 'rebel star', known for playing anti-establishment roles. At the 1981–82 Karnataka State Film Awards, the film received three awards: Best Screenplay (Babu), Best Cinematographer (P. S. Prakash) and Special Jury Award (Ambareesh).

It was remade in Telugu as Antham Kadidi Aarambam (1981), in Tamil as Thyagi (1982) and in Hindi as Meri Aawaz Suno (1981).

== Plot ==
Sushil Kumar is an honest Inspector, who leads a happy life with his wife Sunitha and his mother. Kanwar Lal, a cold-blooded gangster, who is a doppelganger of Sushil is in prison under life imprisonment, as he is the head of a crime syndicate. He controls dangerous gangsters headed by his partners Beg, Mekjee Topiwala and Ajab Singh, who are involved in counterfeit and human trafficking. The CBI Chief Shankar hatches a plan to send Sushil in the place of Kanwar to catch Kanwar's partners, who have high-level influence in the society. Sushil takes up the job by informing his family that he is headed for special duty. Sushil masquerades as Kanwar and creates an impression that Kanwar has escaped from prison and succeeds in joining the syndicate where he starts collecting intel about the gang's illegal activities.

When Sushil's mother dies of stroke, he is not in the position to attend his mother's funeral. While being with Kanwar's partners, Sushil confronts his lost-sister Shobha, whose circumstances have forced her to perform a cabaret number. Both are unable to bear the pain and Shobha commits suicide. Sushil was unable to acknowledge his sister, fearing for his identity and purpose. Sushil succeeds in his mission of collecting information about the illegal activities of the gang, including the higher officials of the government with evidence, but the partners capture him, after learning his identity. Sushil manages to safeguard the collected evidence. They keep him in their custody and torture him. They kidnap Sunitha, who is carrying Sushil's child and kill her in Sushil's presence. Sushil escapes and reaches the higher officials with evidence, but learns that they are helpless in arresting them. Sushil takes law into his own hands and kills Kanwar's partners. He then surrenders himself to the Judiciary with evidence.

== Cast ==
- Ambareesh as Sushil Kumar / Kanwar Lal
- Lakshmi as Sunitha, Sushil's wife
- Latha as Rajni
- Jayamala as Shobha, Sushil's sister
- Pandari Bai as Sushil's Mother
- Vathsala
- Sindhu (credited as Baby Sindhu)
- Vajramuni as Ajab Singh
- Tiger Prabhakar as Mekjee Topiwala
- Shaktiprasad as CID Chief Shankar
- Sundar Krishna Urs as Beg
- Dikki Madhava Rao
- Musuri Krishnamurthy as "Halkat" Lala
- Y. R. Ashwath Narayan
- M. S. Umesh as Prison Warden
- Lakshman as Kulwant
- Sharapanjara Iyengar
- Tomato Somu
- Tiptur Siddharamayya

== Production ==
Antha was based on the novel of same name by H. K. Anantha Rao which was serialised in Kannada weekly magazine which caught Babu's attention and decided to adapt it. Singh Babu revealed even Dr. Rajkumar expressed interest in acting in this film but Babu felt the role will not suit him as the role "wanted somebody who didn't have stardom". After plans of casting Vishnuvardhan, Rajinikanth and Shankar Nag in the lead role were dropped or failed, Ambareesh, who had until then mostly played supporting roles, was cast.

== Soundtrack ==
The soundtrack was composed by G. K. Venkatesh, with lyrics by Chi. Udaya Shankar, R. N. Jayagopal and Geethapriya.

| # | Title | Singer(s) |
|---|---|---|
| 1 | "Baaramma Illi Baaramma" | S. P. Balasubrahmanyam, S. Janaki |
| 2 | "Deepaveke Beku" | S. Janaki |
| 3 | "Naanu Yaaru Yaava Ooru" | S. P. Balasubrahmanyam |
| 4 | "Premavide" | S. Janaki |
| 5 | "Ninna Aata" | S. Janaki |

== Controversy ==
When the film was submitted to the Censor Board for certification, they denied giving any certificate. The Board advised deleting the torture scene of Ambareesh. But director Rajendra Singh Babu stated that it is necessary to the story. Then the Board delayed giving a certificate for the film. The film also involved in controversy for its depiction of politicians. Ultimately the censor passed the film with an A (adults only) certificate sans any cuts or muted dialogues.

== Awards ==
At the 1981–82 Karnataka State Film Awards, the film received three awards: Best Screenplay (Babu), Best Cinematographer (P. S. Prakash) and Special Jury Award (Ambareesh).

== Sequels and remakes ==
The film was remade in Tamil as Thyagi, in Telugu as Antham Kadidi Aarambam, and Rajendra Singh Babu directed the Hindi remake Meri Aawaz Suno. Sudeep announced in 2010 that he would direct the remake of the film with himself in the lead role. However, the project got shelved. Upendra made a sequel for the film called Operation Antha (1995), with Ambareesh reprising his role.

== Legacy ==
The film became a breakthrough in the career of Ambareesh, who went on to become one of the top actors in Kannada film industry. The dialogue from the film "Kutte, Kanwar Nahi Kanwarlal Bolo" (transl. Hey dog, don't call me Kanwar, call me Kanwarlal.) became a famous catchphrase. The Times of India included the film in their list "Top 5 films of Ambareesh". Ambareesh reprised the character of Kanwarlal in Thipparalli Tharlegalu (2010) also directed by Rajendra Singh Babu. Jeetendra who acted in the Hindi remake Meri Aawaz Suno (1981) later went on to work in a gangster flick named after his role in this movie - Kanwarlal (1988) which incidentally was a remake of Malayalam movie Rajavinte Makan (1986).
