= List of Tamil films of 1982 =

Post-amendment to the Tamil Nadu Entertainments Tax Act 1939 on 1 April 1958, Gross jumped to 140 per cent of Nett Commercial Taxes Department disclosed ₹37 crore in entertainment tax revenue for the year.

The following is a list of films produced in the Tamil film industry in India in 1982, in alphabetical order.

== Released films ==
Opening		Title	Director	Cast	Production	Ref
J A N	1	Nadamadum Silaigal	Malleeswar	C. H. Narayana Rao, Shankar, Roopa, Vadivukkarasi	Sri Nithyodaya Pictures	
J A N	2	Vedikkai Manidhargal	B. V. Balaguru	Rajeev, Vijayashanti, Vanitha	Abhirami Enterprises	
J A N	10	Nayakkirin Magal	K. S. Gopalakrishnan	Vijayakumar, Jayachitra, Jai Ganesh, Sathyaraj	Karpagam Studios	
J A N	14	Thunaivi	Valampuri Somanathan	Sivakumar, Sujatha, Sudhakar, Roopa, Surekha, Cho, Thengai Srinivasan	Girnar Films	
J A N	14	Krodham	A. Jagannathan	Prem, Rani Padmini	Lotus Film Company	
J A N	14	Kathoduthan Naan Pesuven	M. A. Kaja	Sripriya, Vijayan, Suruli Rajan, Manorama	Sri Mahamayi Enterprises	
J A N	14	Metti	Mahendran	Sarath Babu, Radhika, C. R. Vijayakumari, Rajesh, Vadivukkarasi	Rose Arts	
J A N	14	Erattai Manithan	K. Shankar	S. S. Rajendran, Jai Ganesh, Latha, Sumithra, Bhavani, V. K. Ramasamy, Manorama	Maruthapandiyan Pictures	
J A N	14	Murai Ponnu	R. Krishnamurthy	Vijayan, Roja Ramani	Saravana Movies	
J A N	14	Pokkiri Raja	S. P. Muthuraman	Rajinikanth, Sridevi, Radhika	AVM Productions	
J A N	14	Anandha Ragam	Bharani	Sivakumar, Radha, Aruna, Goundamani	Panchu Arts	
J A N	14	Ilanjodigal	Rama Narayanan	Karthik, Suresh, Radha, Vijayashanti, Goundamani	Bairavi Films	
J A N	14	Naan Kudithukonde Iruppen	Kadaloor Purushothaman	Thengai Srinivasan, K. R. Vijaya, Vijayakumar	Rajavarthini Pictures	
J A N	26	Vaazhvey Maayam	R. Krishnamurthy	Kamal Haasan, Sridevi, Sripriya, Pratap K. Pothen, Ambika	Suresh Arts	
J A N	26	Hitler Umanath	P. Madhavan	Sivaji Ganesan, K. R. Vijaya, Suruli Rajan	P. V. T. Productions	
J A N	26	Kalyana Kalam	Robert–Rajasekar	Suhasini, Janagaraj, Thyagu	K. R. K. Creations	
F E B	5	Oru Varisu Uruvagiradhu	Moulee	Pratap K. Pothen, Sripriya, Jaishankar	Trinity Creation	
F E B	5	Idhayam Pesugirathu	S. A. Chandrasekhar	Raveendran, Ambika	Sangamam United Movies	
F E B	5	Oorukku Oru Pillai	D. Yoganand	Sivaji Ganesan, K. R. Vijaya, Sripriya	Sri Gomathi Sankar Films	
F E B	6	Vaa Kanna Vaa	D. Yoganand	Sivaji Ganesan, Sujatha, Major Sundarrajan, Nagesh	Sivaji Productions	
F E B	11	Manamadurai Malli	Madurai Thirumaran	Ashok, Boopathy, Vyjayanthi Mala, Nisha	M. S. V. S. Pictures	
F E B	19	Parvaiyin Marupakkam	K. M. Balakrishnan	Vijayakanth, Sripriya, Sivachandran, Silk Smitha	Kannmani Creations	
F E B	19	Kanalukku Karaiyethu		Shankar, Aruna	Pushpanjali Productions	
F E B	19	Moondram Pirai	Balu Mahendra	Kamal Haasan, Sridevi, Silk Smitha	Sathya Jyothi Films	
F E B	19	Asthivaram	T. Thirunavukarasu	Jaishankar, K. R. Vijaya, Vanitha	Kar Creation	
F E B	25	Garuda Saukiyama	K. S. Prakash Rao	Sivaji Ganesan, Sujatha, Thiagarajan	Revathi Combines	
F E B	26	Vadivangal	Madhukoor Kannan	Ramji, Radhika, Suhasini	A. V. P. Combines	
F E B	26	Payanangal Mudivathillai	R. Sundarrajan	Mohan, Poornima Jayaram, S. Ve. Shekher	Motherland Pictures	
M A R	5	Pattanathu Rajakkal	S. A. Chandrasekhar	Vijayakanth, Jaishankar, Silk Smitha	Veeralakshmi Combines	
M A R	5	Iniyavale Vaa	N. C. Chakravarthy	Mohan, Radhika, Rajesh, Menaka, Y. G. Mahendra, Silk Smitha	Aiswarya Art	
M A R	5	Ayiram Muthangal	S. Devarajan	Sivakumar, Radha, Y. G. Mahendra, Charuhasan, Silk Smitha, Vanitha	Vivekanandha Pictures	
M A R	7	Deviyin Thiruvilaiyadal	K. S. Gopalakrishnan	K. R. Vijaya, Sridevi, Thiagarajan	Revathi Cine Arts	
M A R	12	Thanikattu Raja	V. C. Guhanathan	Rajinikanth, Sridevi, Sripriya, Jaishankar, Vijayakumar, Sathyakala, Y. G. Mahendra	Suresh Productions	
M A R	12	Vadaimalai	Maruthi Valli	Srikanth, Saroja, Poornam Viswanathan	Jayamurthy At Madras Chitra	
M A R	12	Thambathyam Oru Sangeetham	Venkat	Mohan, Prasanna, Sulakshana, Jai Ganesh	R. R. Films	
M A R	19	Anu	P. N. Menon	Jaya Devi, Raja, S. S. R. Rajendrakumar	T. R. M. Creations	
M A R	27	Auto Raja	K. Vijayan	Vijayakanth, Jaishankar, Gayathri, Vanitha	Santosh Art Films	
A P R	14	Simla Special	V. Srinivasan	Kamal Haasan, Sripriya, S. Ve. Shekher, Y. G. Mahendra, Manorama, Thengai Srinivasan	Muktha Films	
A P R	14	Sangili	C. V. Rajendran	Sivaji Ganesan, Sripriya, Prabhu, Sumithra, Roja Ramani, Y. G. Mahendra	Arun Sujatha Combines	
A P R	14	Ranga	R. Thyagarajan	Rajinikanth, Radhika, K. R. Vijaya, Raveendran, Silk Smitha	Devar Films	
A P R	21	Theerpu	R. Krishnamurthy	Sivaji Ganesan, Sujatha, Jaishankar, Vijayakumar, Sarath Babu, Silk Smitha	Sujatha Cine Arts	
A P R	30	Kadhal Oviyam	Bharathiraja	Kannan, Radha, Archana, Janagaraj	Manoj Creations	
M A Y	5	Thottal Sudum	N. S. Raj Bharath	Dileep, Suhasini	Hayagreeva Films	
M A Y	7	Kelviyum Naane Pathilum Naane	N. Murugesh	Karthik, Srividya, Aruna	S. T. Combines	
M A Y	7	Vasandhathil Or Naal	A. C. Tirulokchandar	M. S. Viswanathan	Sivaji Ganesan, Sripriya, Thengai Srinivasan	Venus Arts
M A Y	7	Manal Kayiru	Visu	S. Ve. Shekher, Shanthi Krishna, Visu, Manorama, Kismu	Kavithalayaa Productions	
M A Y	7	Sivantha Kangal	Rama Narayanan	Vijayakanth, Usharani	Uma Kannu Creation	
M A Y	10	Nenjil Oru Ragam	T. Rajendar	Saritha, Rajeev	K. R. G. Art Productions	
M A Y	14	Kanavugal Karpanaigal	A. L. S. Kannappan	Sarath Babu, Roopa, Rani Padmini	A. L. S. Enterprises	
M A Y	21	Kadhalithu Paar	A. Jagannathan	Mohan, Radha, Geetha	Sri Niranjani Films	
M A Y	25	Om Shakti	S. A. Chandrasekhar	Vijayakanth, Menaka, Jaishankar	Rajam Movies	
M A Y	28	Thooku Medai	Amirtham	Chandrasekar, Menaka, Chakravarthy, Usha Rajendar	Sri Appan Films	
M A Y	29	Katrukenna Veli	K. N. Subbu	Mohan, Radha, Geetha, Thengai Srinivasan	Bobby Films	
J U N	4	Eera Vizhi Kaaviyangal	B. R. Ravishankar	Sarath Babu, Pratap K. Pothen, Radhika	R. V. Cinemas	
J U N	4	Neram Vandhachu	M. Vellaisamy	Karthik, Radha, Thiagarajan, Usharani, Silk Smitha	Karthik Arts	
J U N	11	Puthukavithai	S. P. Muthuraman	Rajinikanth, Saritha, Jyothi	Kavithalayaa Productions	
J U N	11	Ezhavathu Manithan	K. Hariharan	Raghuvaran, Rathna	Latha Creations	
J U N	14	Echchil Iravugal	A. S. Pragasam	Pratap K. Pothen, Raveendran, Roopa, Vanitha	New Wavers Arts	
J U N	18	Ninaivellam Nithya	C. V. Sridhar	Karthik, Jigi, Nizhalgal Ravi	Shiv Shakthi Films	
J U N	18	Nirantharam	R. K. Murthy	Suresh, Rajeev, Menaka	B. M. K. Pictures	
J U N	18	Idho Varugiren	K. C. Krishna Moorthy	Mohan, Srikamu	S. G. Films	
J U N	24	Amma	Rajasekhar	Pratap K. Pothen, Saritha	AVM Productions	
J U L	2	Sattam Sirikkiradhu	T. R. Ramanna	Vijayakanth, Pratap K. Pothen, Jyothi, Aruna	E. V. R. Films	
J U L	2	Nambinal Nambungal	K. S. Gopinath	Sivakumar, Saritha, Shanthi Krishna	Suresh Chithra Films	
J U L	9	Thaai Mookaambikai	K. Shankar	K. R. Vijaya, Sivakumar, Jaishankar, Sujatha, Saritha, Major Sundarrajan, Karthik, Poornima Jayaram, Thengai Srinivasan, Manorama	Sivashankar Creations	
J U L	9	Nandri, Meendum Varuga	Moulee	Pratap K. Pothen, Suhasini, Jaishankar	Ponmalar International	
J U L	23	Manjal Nila	Ranjith Kumar	Suresh, Kalaranjini, Nizhalgal Ravi	Sri Manickam Films	
J U L	27	Kavithai Malar	S. Devarajan	Madhavi	S. M. Creations	
A U G	6	Raga Bandhangal	P. Ramachandren	Rajamani, Jayashri, Nalini	Venus Arts	
A U G	10	Lottery Ticket	C. V. Rajendran	Mohan, Prabhu, Suhasini, Silk Smitha	R. V. Creations	
A U G	11	Sparisam	R. C. Sakthi	S. Ve. Shekher, Sri Lakshmi	Sri Sathya Sai Art Movies	
A U G	14	Theeradha Vilaiyattu Pillai	Rama Narayanan	Mohan, Poornima Jayaram, Silk Smitha	Shobanaa's Creations	
A U G	14	Enkeyo Ketta Kural	S. P. Muthuraman	Rajinikanth, Ambika, Radha	P. A. Art Productions	
A U G	14	Kanne Radha	Rama Narayanan	Karthik, Radha, Raja, Vanitha	Charuchithra Films	
A U G	14	Sakalakala Vallavan	S. P. Muthuraman	Kamal Haasan, Ambika, Y. G. Mahendra, Silk Smitha	AVM Productions	
A U G	25	Nijangal	K. S. Sethumadhavan	Sivakumar, Menaka	Ramya Chithra Productions	
A U G	27	Panchavarnam	Manimaran	Jacob, Menaka	K. J. Films	
S E P	2	Pakkathu Veetu Roja	M. Bhaskar	Karthik, Radha, Goundamani	Bhairavi Films	
S E P	3	Thyagi	C. V. Rajendran	Sivaji Ganesan, Sujatha, Sripriya, Vijayakumar, Geetha	Padmalaya Pictures	
S E P	3	Poi Satchi	K. Bhagyaraj	K. Bhagyaraj, Radhika	Thirupathysamy Pictures	
S E P	17	Marumagale Vazhga	B. L. V. Prasad-Kalanidhi	Chandrasekar, Suhasini, S. Ve. Shekher, Raghuvaran, Manorama	Shrikant Pictures	
S E P	20	Nalanthana	Durai	Prabhu, Menaka, Thengai Srinivasan	Kailasa Vinayakar Films	
S E P	23	Boomboom Maadu	Adaikalavan	Chandrasekhar, Madhuri	A. N. N. Movies	
S E P	24	Kannodu Kann	Vijay Krishnaraj	Ravi, Sulakshana	Jaidevi Movies	
S E P	24	Kaduvulluku Oru Kadidham	Kalanidhi	Rajeev, Sivachandran, Ganga, Saira Banu, Rani Padmini	J. V. L. Creation	
O C T	1	Thunai	Durai	Sivaji Ganesan, Saritha, Suresh, Radha	Prakash Pictures	
O C T	1	Moondru Mugam	A. Jagannathan	Rajinikanth, Radhika, Rajyalakshmi, Kamala Kamesh	Sathya Movies	
O C T	8	Thaniyatha Dhagam	E. M. Ibrahim	Delhi Ganesh, Swarna	Mansoor Creations	
O C T	9	Theerpugal Thiruththapadalam	M. Bhaskar	Sivakumar, Ambika, Sathyakala	Oscar Movies	
O C T	9	Raagam Thedum Pallavi	T. Rajendar	Shankar, Roopa	Raja Cine Arts	
O C T	9	Rani Theni	G. N. Rangarajan	Kamal Haasan, Deepan Chakravarthy, Sri, Vanitha	Parameswari Enterprises	
O C T	9	Pannai Purathu Pandavargal	B. Lenin	Sarath Babu, Saritha, Geetha, Y. G. Mahendra	Jayasarathy Enterprises	
O C T	15	Archanai Pookal	Gokula Krishnan	Chandrasekhar, Mohan, Rajyalakshmi, Subhathra	Bagavathi Creations	
O C T	15	Gopurangal Saivathillai	Manivannan	Mohan, Suhasini, Radha, S. Ve. Shekher	Everest Films	
O C T	15	Antha Rathirikku Satchi Illai	R. Sundarrajan	Kapildev, Sivachandran, Sulakshana, Vanitha, Usha Rajendar	K. R. G. Art Productions	
O C T	15	Nadodi Raja	S. M. Omar	Rajeev, Aruna, Thiagarajan, Y. G. Mahendra	Balaji Creative Enterprises	
O C T	15	Mul Illatha Roja	K. Ramraj	Chakravarthy, Vijayakala, Delhi Ganesh, Goundamani, Usha Rani	Om Saravana Bava Creations	
O C T	22	Neethi Devan Mayakkam	Bapu	Bhanu Chander, Madhavi	Sathya Chithra Combines	
O C T	22	Kuppathu Ponnu	Feroz Sharif	Satyajit, Asha	Zoroo Creations	
N O V	14	Adhisayappiravigal	R. Thyagarajan	Karthik, Jaishankar, Prabhu, Radha, Rajyalakshmi, Y. G. Mahendra, Vanitha, S. Ve. Shekher	Devar Films	
N O V	14	Oorum Uravum	Major Sundarrajan	Sivaji Ganesan, Sripriya, Major Sundarrajan, Y. G. Mahendra, Nizhalgal Ravi	Raja Mahalakshmi Arts	
N O V	14	Avanuku Nigar Avane	M. Karnan	Suman, Madhan Kumar, Vasantha, Swetha	Indhrani Films	
N O V	14	Darling, Darling, Darling	K. Bhagyaraj	K. Bhagyaraj, Poornima Jayaram, Suman, Aruna, Baby Anju	Vigranth Creation	
N O V	14	Pagadai Panirendu	N. Dhamodharan	Kamal Haasan, Sripriya, Y. G. Mahendra	Swarnambika Productions	
N O V	14	Nizhal Thedum Nenjangal	P. S. Nivas	Rajeev, Vijayashanti, Bhanu Chander, Subhadra, Vadivukkarasi	Sivachithra Pictures	
N O V	14	Kanmani Poonga	Visu	Visu, Saritha, Chakravarthy, Sivashankari, Kismu	Ananthi Films	
N O V	14	Paritchaikku Neramaachu	V. Srinivasan	Sivaji Ganesan, Sujatha, Y. G. Mahendra	Vidhya Movies	
N O V	14	Agni Sakshi	K. Balachander	Sivakumar, Saritha, Swapna	Kavithalayaa Productions	
N O V	14	Thooral Ninnu Pochchu	K. Bhagyaraj	K. Bhagyaraj, Sulakshana, M. N. Nambiar	Durga Bhagavathy Films	
N O V	14	Valibamey Vaa Vaa	Bharathiraja	Karthik, Radha, Goundamani	Sri Amman Creation	
N O V	30	Aval Etriya Deepam	P. Bhanumathi	P. Bhanumathi, Sarath Babu	Bharani Pictures	
D E C	6	Vetri Namedhe	R. Sundaram	Rajeev, Rajesh, Vanitha, Usha Rajendra	Modern Theatres	
D E C	10	Nenjangal	Major Sundarrajan	Sivaji Ganesan, Lakshmi, Vijayakumar, Silk Smitha	Vanitha Film Production	
D E C	11	Chinnan Chirusugal	Rama Narayanan	Mohan, Sulakshana, Prabhu, Silk Smitha	Sri Thenandal Films	
D E C	17	Agaya Gangai	Manobala	Karthik, Suhasini, Goundamani	Sreeni Enterprises	
D E C	17	Azhagiya Kanne	Mahendran	Sarath Babu, Sumalatha, Suhasini, Baby Anju	Southern Creations	
D E C	25	Mamiyara Marumagala	A. K. Subramaniam	Sudhakar, Radhika	Narayanan Movies	
D E C	25	Magane Magane	K. N. Lakshmanan	Suresh, Poornima Rao, Manju Bhargavi	Panju Arts	
D E C	25	Kozhi Koovuthu	Gangai Amaran	Prabhu, Suresh, Silk Smitha, Viji	Pavalar Creations	
