= Kochi Metro (Malayalam) Short Film Fest =

- Location: Kochi, Kerala; U.A.E. (2016)
- Language: Malayalam
- Website: www.kochimetroshortfilmfest.com m.facebook.com/KochiMetroMalayalamShortFilmFest

Kochi Metro (Malayalam) Short Film Fest (Malayalam: കൊച്ചി മെട്രോ (മലയാളം) ഷോർട്ട് ഫിലിം ഫെസ്റ്റ്) is an annual film festival held in Kochi, Kerala, devoted to short films made in Malayalam language. The Short film pool consists of animation films, Student films, Experimental films as well as Documentary films. Established in the year 2014 by festival director Raveendran, a popular actor in Malayalam and Tamil language films at Gold Souk Grande, Kochi. Malayalam actor Mohanlal is the festival chairman.

The festival was held between December 26, 2014 to January 11, 2015 with more than 360 short films participating in the event. Short movies by women directors was also shown for the audience, attended by Mohanlal, actress Manju Warrier and film director Sathyan Anthikad.

The short film festival was dedicated to promote the essence of Malayalam language (ശ്രേഷ്ഠ ഭാഷ മലയാളം) and Kerala culture. The festival also provided opportunities and guidelines for the development of young film makers. were playing vital role on this fest. It also organized interviews with working industry professionals, live Q&A sessions with directors and producers as well as seminars, workshops and finally introduced newest film technologies like big screen video wall projection and walk through video projection.

The 2015 edition of the festival was held on December last week at Bolgatty Palace Island, Kochi where the place will be known as Media Island. The Island hosted photography, painting and poster designing contest; shows by film stars, dance show, music show, fashion show, DJ Party, art exhibition, management fest, tech fest, food fest and shopping festival. The fest was supported by Kerala Government Public Relations Department as well as Kerala Tourism Development Corporation and unlike the first edition, this festival also organized competition for all section of short films. The festival supported Malayalam language short films, documentary films, animation films, ad film and music albums. It also provided enough opportunity to all short film makers around the globe to meet and exchange thoughts in a common platform and also conducts seminars, film work shop, and interaction with film makers and different personalities from various field.

The festival also started its UAE chapter from 23 September 2016 targeting the expatriates to provide a good platform for aspiring short film makers at the venues Sharjah, Abu Dhabi and Dubai. Two theme based contests namely Pravasam (on expat life) and Sneham (love) has been announced for experienced and non-experienced filmmakers respectively and 45 short films will be selected on U.A.E.' s 45th national day.

The short films made by the expatriates will have a new venue to exhibit at Vismayas CineMax, Perintalmanna from 25 to 27, November 2016 in its chapter Arabian Frames. This chapter also introduces expatriate film makers to Kerala and train them with film festivals, film literacy programs, film history learning camps and make them well equipped for professional film making.

== Key People ==
- Festival Chairman - Mohanlal
- Festival Director - Raveendran

== See also ==
List of short film festivals
