= Enakkaga Kaathiru =

- Title card
- Directed by: P. S. Nivas
- Written by: E. Ramdoss (dialogues)
- Screenplay by: G. K.
- Story by: G. K.
- Produced by: P. S. Nivas
- Starring: Suman; Sumalatha; Nisha; Bhanu Chander
- Cinematography: P. S. Nivas
- Music by: Ilaiyaraaja
- Production company: Niveda Combines
- Release date: 11 September 1981
- Running time: 160 minutes
- Country: India
- Language: Tamil

Enakkaga Kaathiru (transl. Wait for me) is a 1981 Indian Tamil-language film directed and photographed by P. S. Nivas. The film stars Suman, Sumalatha and Bhanu Chander. It was released on 11 September 1981.

== Cast ==
- Suman
- Sumalatha
- Nisha
- Bhanu Chander

== Production ==
Enakkaga Kaathiru is Nivas' second film as director after Kallukkul Eeram (1980). The film was completely shot at Kashmir.

== Soundtrack ==
The music was composed by Ilaiyaraaja.

Song	Singers	Lyrics	Length
"Dhaham"	Uma Ramanan	Vairamuthu	03:40
"Oh Nenjame"	Deepan Chakravarthy, S. Janaki	Gangai Amaran	05:41
"Ooty Malai"	Ilaiyaraaja	Gangai Amaran	04:40
"Pani Mazhai"	Deepan Chakravarthy, S. P. Sailaja	Gangai Amaran	04:36

== Release and reception ==
Enakkaga Kaathiru was released on 11 September 1981. Sindhu and Jeeva of Kalki wrote this directorial venture of Nivas tested their patience and the film sinks when the karate and romance ratio goes awry and felt the actors were struggling to emote but praised the locations and Ilaiyaraaja's music.
