= Raveendran (actor) =

Indian actor

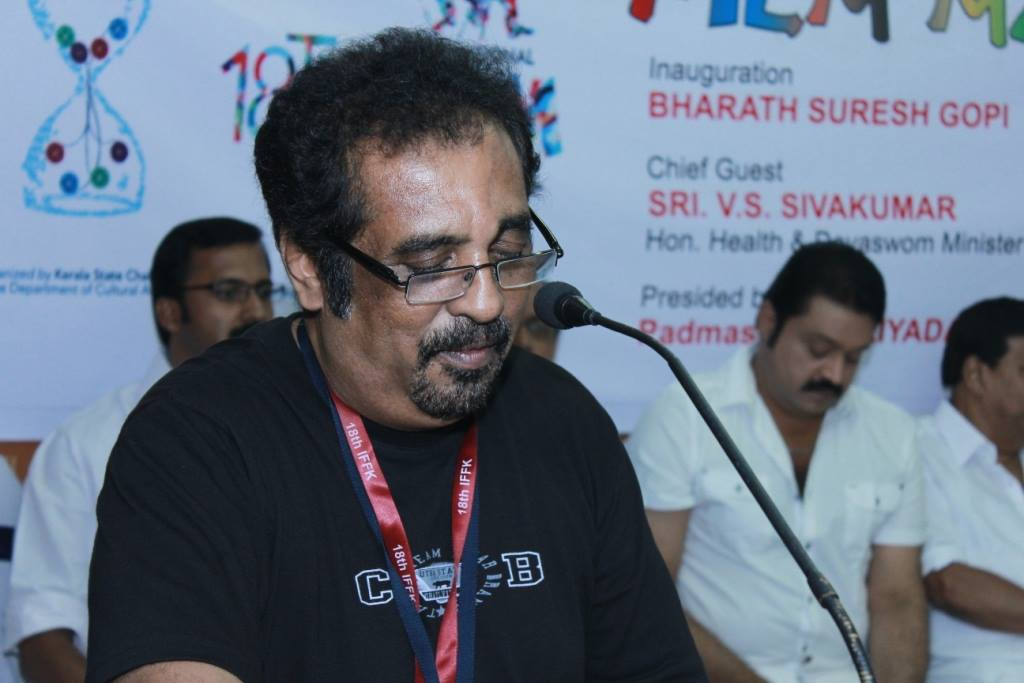
- Born: Thampi Elias; Thrippunithura, Kochi, Kerala, India
- Other names: Disco Raveendran; Ravindher
- Education: Adyar Film Institute
- Occupations: Actor; Film scholar; Filmmaker; TV anchor; Interior designer
- Years active: 1980–1995; 2004–present
- Spouse: Suma
- Children: 3
- Parents: Elias; Dr. Saramma

Raveendran is an Indian actor, primarily concentrating in Malayalam and Tamil films and he was a very busy actor of both these languages in the 1980s. A multi-faceted personality, Raveendran is also a screenwriter, interior designer, anchor, a film scholar, an acting coach, social activist and director of film festivals like Kochi Metro (Malayalam) Short Film Fest. He is an alumnus of the Adyar Film Institute.

== Career ==
Raveendran had his specialisation in acting from Adyar Film Institute (now called M. G. R. Government Film and Television Training Institute) in 1979. He made his feature film debut in the Tamil hit Oru Thalai Ragam (1980) and later he acted in 140 films in different languages including Malayalam, Tamil. He played the second lead in Kamal Haasan and Rajnikanth movies like Sakalakala Vallavan, Per Sollum Pillai, Ram Lakshman, Ranga, Thanga Magan and Pokkiri Raja. Often cited as Disco Raveendran for his dance movements, he concentrated more in Malayalam with I. V. Sasi movies like Ashwaradham, Ee Nadu, John Jaffer Janardhanan, Innalenkil Nale, Sindoora Sandhyakku Mounam, Iniyengilum, Athiratram, Idanilangal, Karimpinpoovinakkare, Rangam, Abhayam Thedi and was a part of numerous hit films until he decided to quit movies. In Tamil, he has also done major roles in Echchil Iravugal, Poikkal Kudhirai, En Priyame and Kutravaaligal. He became a notable film star through his acting in almost 80 superhit films like Ram Lakshman, Sakalakala Vallavan, Ee Nadu, Madrasile Mon, Pappayude Swantham Appoos, etc. He did a wide variety of genres like action, romantic, and comedy who has exposed his artistic villain characters and has become a sensation who did equal par roles with the South Indian superstars at his prime. He has acted in films directed by famous South Indian directors like K. Balachander, S. P. Muthuraman, I. V. Sasi, and Hariharan. He has also worked with big production companies like AVM, Navodaya, Devar Films, Sathya Movies and Dwarakesh.

He came back to films and did smaller roles till 2013 and then played one of the lead roles in Idukki Gold directed by Aashiq Abu and Kili Poyi directed by Vinay Govind. He made his debut as story writer through Sathyan Anthikad's Ennum Eppozhum and is the festival director of Kochi Metro (Malayalam) Short Film Fest.

Raveendran is also an interior designer and has introduced and executed the innovative steel structural space frames of UC College Stadium, Gulfar convention center, Kannamaly and Kothad churches, Kochi and the Petrol bunk at Bakery Junction, Thiruvananthapuram.

== Personal life ==
He is born to Elias and Dr. Saramma at Thrippunithura, Kerala, India. He completed 2 years of acting course at South India Film Chambers, Chennai and completed degree course at Film and Television Institute of India, Pune.

He is married to Suma. The couple have three children, Mareena, Bibin and Fabin. His son Fabin has acted in Idukki Gold in Michael's childhood role. He is a member and supporter of Indian National Congress.

== Other achievements ==
Raveendran has attained his Masters Certificate in Construction Management from the World of Concrete, USA (1996). He has been the convener of Indian Concrete Institute, Kerala (1995-2000) and has had his name highlighted for preparing various structures together with the concepts for Kerala's biggest construction centre, Gulfar. His contributions further stretch the list to Fisheries Department's Hatchery Shed, Bharat Petroleum gas filling station in Trivandrum, churches in Kochi (Kothad and Kalamaserry), etc. The structure design partners of the aforesaid projects were big institutions like Madras IIT, SCRC, and Anna University.

In 1996 The Economic Times reported Raveendran as India's most important building material distributor. He has also secured various medals from Tata Steel, Birla Cement, ACL, LST and other companies. For the first time, Tata's director of sales prepared a 15-page booklet on Raveendran's marketing strategy and sent to all zonal managers in India.

Raveendran is also a well known interior designer in Kerala and has also worked as an interior designer in the Handicraft Development Corporation of Kerala.

=== Recognitions ===
Raveendran has been conducting classes, seminars and festivals on cinema studies, drama, theatre works and short movies. Monsoon Film Fest, a traveling film festival, directed by Ravindhar, has been presented even in Paris. He has been the director of Peace International Film festival (1995 to 2008), Swaralaya International Film Festival (2007 to 2008) and has conducted various film festivals like Bharathan Film Festival, Padmarajan Festival, Lohithadas Festival, etc. over various universities in Kerala. He has also presented several programmes about cinema and sports in the major Malayalam television channels such as Asianet and Kairali, premiered a political satire programme in India Vision during the time of general election and has judged dancing reality shows in major TV channels. He has also joined for religious documentaries of Varapuzha and Ernakulam dioceses.

=== Present endeavours ===
Presently Raveendran is the director of ‘Elias Foundations’ and is conducting film festivals and film appreciation courses in GCC countries and various universities in South India. He has conducted researches on film economics, movie aesthetics and businesses, film culture and technology and is now engaged in writing, directing and producing documentaries for Elias Foundations. Raveendran has been having a great connection with the UAE authorities. Him along with Mohanlal has conducted the first ever UAE national day celebration outside the country of the UAE. He has supervised film festivals and free filmmaking workshops in all the Emirates and has presented seminars in Sharjah International Book Fair about the topics “Visual Literacy” in 2019 and 2022 and “Semiotics of Moving Images” in 2021.

He has also done an interview about his experience undergoing a test for COVID-19 and that has published as an article in the official news agency of the UAE, Emirates News Agency, also known as WAM.

Raveendran unveiled his book "Artificial Intelligence and the Future of Cinema" at the 43rd Sharjah International Book Fair.

== Filmography ==
=== Actor ===
==== Malayalam ====
Year	Title	Role	Notes
1980	Swandam Enna Padam		
1980	Ashwaradham	Ramootti	
1980	Varanmaare Aavashyamundu		
1981	Kaahalam		
1982	Anuraagakkodathi	Rajan	
1982	Madrasile Mon		
1982	Kaalam	Rajan	
1982	Aasha	Kabir Mohammad	
1982	Aarambham		
1982	Velicham Vitharunna Penkutty	Jayan	
1982	Veedu		
1982	Ee Nadu	Prathapan	
1982	Bheeman		
1982	Anthiveyilile Ponnu		
1982	Sindoora Sandhyakku Mounam	Kumar	
1982	John Jaffer Janardhanan	Jaffer	
1982	Innalenkil Nale	Ravi	
1983	Angam	Rajan	
1983	Thimingalam	Venu	
1983	Iniyengilum	Pradeep	
1983	Paalam		
1983	Thaavalam		
1983	Theeram Thedunna Thira	Suresh	
1983	Eettappuli	Inspector Jayan	
1983	Asuran		
1983	Bhookambam	Pramod	
1983	Aattakalasam	Vikas	
1984	Mainakam		
1984	Athirathram	Chandru	
1984	Poomadhathe Pennu		
1984	Minimol Vathicanil		
1984	Chakkarayumma		
1984	Velichamillatha Veedhi		
1985	Rangam	Madhavan	
1985	Karimpinpoovinakkare	Thampi	
1985	Aazhi		
1985	Thammil Thammil	Thampy	
1985	Idanilangal	Maniyan	
1986	Abhayam Thedi	Rajendran	
1986	Ente Shabdham	Sivan	
1987	Aattakatha		
1992	Mukhamudra		
1992	Pappayude Swantham Appoos	Rudran	
1993	Uppukandam Brothers	Vasu's son	
1993	Bhoomi Geetham	Vijayan	
1993	Customs Diary		
1994	Cabinet		
1994	Napoleon		
2004	Kathavaseshan		
2005	Chandrolsavam		
2005	Bharathchandran I.P.S.		
2006	Lanka		
2006	Notebook	Doctor	
2006	Rashtram		
2006	Chakkaramuthu		
2009	Swantham Lekhakan	Ravi Kumar	
2011	Oru Nunakkadha		
2011	Vaadamalli		
2012	101 Weddings	CI Chandrabose	
2013	Kili Poyi	Disco Douglas	
2013	Idukki Gold	K.C. Ravi	
2014	Salalah Mobiles	Hawala dealer	
2014	Manglish	Pothen	
2014	Vellivelichathil	Gautham's father	
2014	Ormayundo Ee Mukham		
2014	Ennum Eppozhum		
2015	Njan Samvidhanam Cheyyum		
2017	Cappuccino		
2017	Pashu		
2019	Kettyolaanu Ente Malakha	Bombay Sajeevan	
2024	DNA	Dr. Raymond D’Cunha	
2025	Haal		
2026	Vaazha II: Biopic of a Billion Bros	Benny	

==== Tamil ====
- Note: he was also credited as Raveendar.

Year	Title	Role	Notes
1980	Oru Thalai Ragam	Madhu	
1980	Vasantha Azhaippugal		
1980	Sujatha		
1980	Anjatha Nenjangal	Ranga	
1981	Oru Iravu Oru Paravai		
1981	Ram Lakshman	Raja	
1981	Kaalam		
1981	Mouna Yuddham		
1981	Panimalar		
1982	Sakalakala Vallavan	Pazhani	
1982	Ranga	Ravi	
1982	Pokkiri Raja		
1982	Anal Kaatru		
1982	Nandri, Meendum Varuga		Guest appearance
1982	Idhayam Pesugirathu	Sundar	
1982	Echchil Iravugal		
1983	Yudhakaandam		
1983	Thanga Magan	Ravi	
1983	Kann Sivanthaal Mann Sivakkum	Pakkiri	
1983	Poikkal Kudhirai	Muthu	
1983	Adutha Varisu	Prathap	
1983	En Priyame		
1984	Puyal Kadantha Bhoomi		
1984	Vai Sollil Veeranadi		
1984	Vaazhkai	Ramesh	
1984	Pudhiavan	Prakash	
1984	Kaval Kaithigal		
1984	Veetuku Oru Kannagi	Ravi	
1985	Thiramai		
1985	Poove Poochooda Vaa		Guest appearance
1985	Vetrikani		
1985	Kutravaaligal		
1985	Kalyana Agathigal	Ambikapathy	
1986	Mamiyargal Jakkirathai		
1986	Iravu Pookkal	Deaf-mute man	
1986	Unakkaagave Vaazhgiren	Vishnu	
1986	Vidinja Kalyanam	Balu	
1987	Ival Oru Pournami		
1987	Per Sollum Pillai		
1988	Aval Mella Sirithal		
1995	Paattu Vaathiyar	Maarappan	
2005	6′.2″	Ramamurthy	
2015	Kaaki Sattai		

=== Writer ===
Year	Film	Director
2015	Ennum Eppozhum (Story)	Sathyan Anthikad
