= Needhi Pizhaithathu =

- Title card
- Directed by: S. A. Chandrasekharan
- Written by: Pulavar Muthubharathi (dialogues)
- Story by: K. P. Kottarakkara
- Produced by: K. P. Ganesh
- Starring: Vijayakanth; Mucherla Aruna; Jaishankar
- Cinematography: D. D. Prasad
- Edited by: K. Sankunni
- Music by: Shankar–Ganesh
- Production company: Sharada Arts
- Release date: 28 November 1981
- Running time: 116 minutes
- Country: India
- Language: Tamil

Needhi Pizhaithathu (transl. Justice has prevailed) is a 1981 Indian Tamil-language action drama film directed by S. A. Chandrasekharan, starring Vijayakanth, Jaishankar and Mucherla Aruna. It was released on 28 November 1981.

== Cast ==
- Vijayakanth as Vijay
- Mucherla Aruna as Sheela
- Jaishankar as Shankar
- Uma as Geetha
- Silk Smitha as Mala
- S. S. Chandran as Rama Rao Chettiar
- Kalaranjini as Usha
- V. Gopalakrishnan

== Production ==
After the success of Sattam Oru Iruttarai (1981), director S. A. Chandrasekhar and actor Vijayakanth reunited for Needhi Pizhaithathu the same year.

== Soundtrack ==
The music was composed by Shankar–Ganesh.

Track listing
| No. | Title | Lyrics | Singer(s) | Length |
|---|---|---|---|---|
| 1. | "Edhuvarai Inbam" | Pulamaipithan | P. Jayachandran, S. Janaki |
| 2. | "Chikkichikka Chikkichikka" | Poonguyilan | Vani Jairam |
| 3. | "Vanakkam Vanakkam" | Pulamaipithan | S. P. Balasubrahmanyam |
| 4. | "Dham Dham Naanorudham" | Vaali | S. Janaki |

== Reception ==
Sindhu Jeeva of Kalki panned the film for its plot, music, dialogues and illogical sequences.
