= Jyothi (actress, born 1963) =

Indian actress

- Born: Jyothi; January 1, 1963
- Died: 18 May 2007 (aged 44); Chennai, India
- Occupation: Actress

Jyothi (1 January 1963 - 18 May 2007) was an Indian actress who appeared in South Indian films.

== Career ==
She acted in over 50 films. She is known for films like Pudukavithai and Rail Payanangalil. She had acted in over 50 films in Tamil and Telugu including Toorpu Velle Railu and Vamsa Vruksham in her earlier career.

She shot into the limelight when her maiden film Rayil Payanangalil, directed by T. Rajendar, turned out to be a success. She had also paired with Rajinikanth in Pudukavithai, produced by Kavithalayaas in the mid-1980s.

== Partial filmography ==
Year	Film	Role	Language	Notes
1979	Toorpu Velle Railu	Alimelu	Telugu	
1980	Vamsa Vruksham		Telugu	Filmfare Best Actress Award (Telugu)
1981	Rail Payanangalil		Tamil	
1981	Kanni Theevu		Tamil	
1982	Pudukavithai	Uma	Tamil	
1982	Sattam Sirikkiradhu		Tamil	
1982	Nenjangal		Tamil	
1982	Malle Pandiri	Syamala	Telugu	
1982	Koritharicha Naal		Malayalam	
1982	Maro Malupu		Telugu	
1982	Aa Divasam		Malayalam	
1983	Idhi Kaadu Mugimpu	Deepa	Telugu	
1983	Asthram	Rekha	Malayalam	
1983	Gramathu Kiligal		Tamil	
1983	Ikanaina Marandi		Telugu	
1983	Ee Desamlo Oka Roju		Telugu	
1983	Ee Pillaku Pellavuthundha		Telugu	
1984	Swarna Gopuram	Mercy	Malayalam	
1984	Shankari	Gracy	Tamil	
1984	Mudivalla Arambam		Tamil	
1985	Raman Sreeraman	Vidya	Tamil	
1985	Bhale Thammudu	Neelaveni	Telugu	
1985	Sri Katna Leelalu		Telugu	
1987	Agni Putrudu	Gayatri	Telugu	
1987	Raga Leela		Telugu	
1988	Chikkadu Dorakadu		Telugu	
1989	Raktha Kanneeru	Nirmala	Telugu	
1989	Ashoka Chakravarthy	Rukmini	Telugu	
1990	Chinna Kodalu		Telugu	
1991	Stuartpuram Police Station		Telugu	
1991	Indra Bhavanam		Telugu	
1991	Surya IPS	Parvathi	Telugu	
1991	Nirnayam	Nalini	Telugu	
1992	Killer	Lalitha	Telugu	
1992	Dharma Kshetram	Benarjee's sister	Telugu	
1992	Nani		Telugu	
1992	Joker Mama Super Alludu		Telugu	
1992	Police Brothers		Telugu	
1993	Jeevana Vedam		Telugu	
1994	Kalikalam Adadi		Telugu	
1995	Desa Drohulu		Telugu	
2000	Parthen Rasithen	Shankar's mother	Tamil	
2000	Vanna Thamizh Pattu	Bhuvana's mother	Tamil	
2001	Ullam Kollai Poguthae	Jyothi's mother	Tamil	
2001	Kadal Pookkal	Peter's mother	Tamil	
2002	Alli Arjuna	Kishore's mother	Tamil	
2002	Raja	Raja's mother	Tamil	
2002	Style	Viji's mother	Tamil	
2003	Kalatpadai	Bhama	Tamil	
2003	Anbu	Anbu's mother	Tamil	

== Death ==
Affected with breast cancer, she was admitted to a private hospital in Chennai a few days before her death. She did not respond to the treatment and died on the night of 18 May 2007, at the age of 44. A divorcee, she was staying with her daughter at suburban Neelangarai on the ECR and getting treatment for the last couple of years. Her body was cremated at Besant Nagar crematorium.
