= Pallavi (1977 film) =

- Directed by: B. K. Pottekkad
- Written by: Parathulli Raveendran
- Produced by: T. P. Haridas
- Starring: Jayabharathi; T. R. Omana; Bahadoor; M. G. Soman
- Cinematography: P. S. Nivas
- Edited by: V. P. Krishnan
- Music by: Kannur Rajan
- Production company: Anugraha Arts
- Release date: 25 February 1977
- Country: India
- Language: Malayalam

Pallavi is a 1977 Indian Malayalam-language film directed by B. K. Pottekkad and produced by T. P. Haridas. The film stars Jayabharathi, T. R. Omana, Bahadoor and M. G. Soman.

== Cast ==
- Vincent
- Jayabharathi
- M. G. Soman
- T. R. Omana
- Bahadoor
- Rajakokila
- Lalithasree

== Soundtrack ==
The music was composed by Kannur Rajan.

| Song | Singers | Lyrics |
|---|---|---|
| "Devi Kshethranadayil" | K. J. Yesudas | Parathulli Raveendran |
| "Kannaale Paaru" | P. Jayachandran | P. Bhaskaran |
| "Kilikkotha" | P. Madhuri, Chorus | Parathulli Raveendran |
| "Kinaavinte Kadavil" | K. J. Yesudas | Parathulli Raveendran |

== Reception ==
A critic from Free India wrote when the director of a film decides to narrate the story "in detail and establish convincingly the characteristics of the different characters in the story it is bound to be slow" and added despite the film moving slowly it sustains interest till the end.
