= Alaya Deepam =

- Poster
- Directed by: C. V. Sridhar
- Story by: C. V. Sridhar
- Produced by: K. R. Gangadharan
- Starring: Sujatha; Rajesh; Suresh; Ilavarasi
- Cinematography: P. Bhaskar Rao
- Edited by: K. R. Ramalingam
- Music by: M. S. Viswanathan
- Production company: K. R. G. Film Circuit
- Release date: 6 July 1984
- Country: India
- Language: Tamil

Alaya Deepam (transl. The temple lamp) is a 1984 Indian Tamil-language drama film directed by C. V. Sridhar and produced by K. R. Gangadharan. The film stars Sujatha, Rajesh, Suresh and Ilavarasi. It was released on 6 July 1984. The film was remade in Telugu under the same title in 1985 with Sujatha, Suresh, Ilavarasi and Y. G. Mahendran reprising their roles.

== Cast ==
- Sujatha
- Rajesh
- Suresh
- Ilavarasi
- Jaishankar
- Vanitha
- Manorama
- Thengai Srinivasan
- Y. G. Mahendran
- V. Gopalakrishnan in Guest appearance
- Typist Gopu

== Production ==
The song "Aagayam Kaanatha" was shot at Ooty.

== Soundtrack ==
The soundtrack was composed by M. S. Viswanathan, with lyrics by Vaali.

Track listing
No.	Title	Singer(s)	Length
1.	"Enni Chollava Un Mutha Kanakku"	S. P. Balasubrahmanyam, S. Janaki
2.	"Adi Meera Podu Jalra"	Vani Jairam
3.	"Agayam Kanatha Sooryodhayam Ennalum Theyatha Chanthrothayam"	Vani Jairam
4.	"Adi Radha Unnai Nee Thaa"	S. P. Balasubrahmanyam, S. Janaki

== Critical reception ==
Jayamanmadhan (a duo) of Kalki praised the acting of actors and they concluded the review by advising Sridhar that he can think and make films after watching films releasing in present times. Balumani of Anna praised acting, music but felt the concept of society will isolate film actors sounds unacceptable yet Sridhar gave a film without any lag which can be watched by everyone.
