= Thudikkum Karangal (1983 film) =

1983 film by C. V. Sridhar

- Theatrical release poster
- Directed by: C. V. Sridhar
- Written by: C. V. Sridhar
- Produced by: K. R. Gangadharan
- Starring: Rajinikanth; Radha
- Cinematography: Tiwari
- Edited by: K. R. Ramalingam
- Music by: S. P. Balasubrahmanyam
- Production company: K. R. G. Film Circuit
- Release date: March 4, 1983
- Running time: 137 minutes
- Country: India
- Language: Tamil

Thudikkum Karangal (transl. Shivering hands) is a 1983 Indian Tamil-language action drama film written and directed by C. V. Sridhar, and produced by K. R. Gangadharan. The film stars Rajinikanth and Radha, while Jaishankar, Sujatha, Vijayakumar and Y. G. Mahendran play other supporting roles. The soundtrack was composed by S. P. Balasubrahmanyam, who made his debut as composer with this film in Tamil. It was average at box-office.

== Plot ==
Gopi is an auto mechanic and brother of Balu, who works in Ramesh's estate as a clerk. The film portrays the events dealing with the clash between Gopi and Ramesh. Radha is the love interest of Gopi and Babu provides comic relief.

== Cast ==
- Rajinikanth as Gopi
- Radha as Radha
- Jaishankar as Ramesh
- Sujatha as Balu's wife
- Vijayakumar as Balu
- Y. G. Mahendran as Babu, Ramesh Assistant
- Vanitha Krishnachandran as Stella
- Prathapachandran as Church father
- Silk Smitha as Seetha
- LIC Narasimhan as Doctor
- Master Haja Sheriff as Workshop boy

== Production ==
The film was launched at AVM Studios and the recording of the song "Adada Idhuthan" happened on the same day. The film was predominantly shot in Ooty, where filming lasted a month.

== Soundtrack ==
The music was composed by S. P. Balasubrahmanyam. This was his first film in Tamil as composer.

| Title | Singer(s) | Lyrics | Duration | Pictured On |
|---|---|---|---|---|
| "Adada Ithuthan" | S. P. Balasubrahmanyam, S. Janaki | Pulamaipithan | 4:16 | Rajnikanth, Radha |
| "Megam Mundhanai" | S. P. Balasubrahmanyam, Vani Jairam | Pulamaipithan | 4:46 | Rajnikanth, Radha |
| "Santhanam Poosum" | S. P. Balasubrahmanyam, S. Janaki | Pulamaipithan | 3:51 | Rajnikanth, Radha |
| "Thottu Kitta" | S. P. Balasubrahmanyam, S. Janaki | Gangai Amaran | 4:27 | Jaishankar, Silk Smitha |
| "Ullaththil" | S. P. Balasubrahmanyam, B. S. Sasirekha | Gangai Amaran | 3:39 | Rajnikanth, Silk Smitha |
| "Valibam Vaadatha" | S. P. Balasubrahmanyam, Durga | Gangai Amaran | 4:39 | Rajnikanth, Radha |

== Critical reception ==
Thiraignani of Kalki wrote that Sridhar proved that he could direct a film with vigor and show it from the commercial point of view of the producers.
