= Rail Payanangalil =

- Theatrical release poster
- Directed by: T. Rajendar
- Written by: T. Rajendar
- Produced by: Mayilai Gurupatham
- Starring: Sreenath; Jyothi; Rajeev; Sivaranjani
- Cinematography: C. S. Ravibabu
- Edited by: R. Devarajan
- Music by: T. Rajendar
- Production company: G. R. P. Arts
- Release date: 28 May 1981
- Running time: 135 minutes
- Country: India
- Language: Tamil

Rail Payanangalil (transl. On train journeys) is a 1981 Indian Tamil-language film written, directed and scored by T. Rajendar. The film stars Sreenath, Jyothi, Rajeev and Sivaranjani. It was released on 28 May 1981.

== Plot ==
A singer and his fan have an unrequited love, but she marries a sadist bent on torturing her, questioning her chastity at every turn. The singer, in the end, to prove her chastity, attempts to molest her only to lose his life in the process of establishing her virtue to her husband.

== Cast ==
- Sreenath as N. Vasanth
- Jyothi as Shanthi
- Rajeev as Deepak
- Sivaranjani
- Master Ananth
- Idichapuli Selvaraj
- Dilip as Ravi, Vasanth's PA
- Veeraraghavan
- T. Rajendar in a cameo appearance as train passenger in Coimbatore in "Vasantham Paadi Vara"

== Soundtrack ==
The music was composed by T. Rajendar, who also wrote the lyrics. The songs "Amaithikku Peyarthaan" "Ada Yaaro", "Vasantham Paadi Vara" and "Noolumillai" attained popularity.

Song	Singers	Length
"Vasantham Paadi Vara"	S. P. Balasubrahmanyam	04:48
"Vasantha Kaalangal"	Jayachandran	04:45
"Ada Yaaro"	S. P. Balasubrahmanyam	04:36
"Noolumillai"	T. M. Soundararajan	05:27
"Vasantham Paadi Vara"	Janaki	04:48
"Amaithikku Peyarthaan"	T. M. Soundararajan	05:17

== Reception ==
The film ran for over 175 days in theatres. Nalini Sastry of Kalki praised Rajender's dialogues and music, and the performance of the actors but panned the ending as artificial. Naagai Dharuman of Anna praised Rajender for his music and direction and for handling many technical burden but felt story and screenplay could have been much better. He also praised the cinematography and acting of the cast.
