= P. S. Nivas =

Indian cinematographer (1946–2021)

- Born: 27 May 1946; Calicut, Kerala, India
- Died: 1 February 2021 (aged 75); Eduthuvecha kallu, Kozhikode District
- Occupations: Cinematographer; Film director Producer

Panayamparambil Sreenivasan a.k.a. P. S. Nivas (27 May 1946 – 1 February 2021) was an Indian cinematographer, film director and film producer who worked in Malayalam, Tamil, Telugu, and Hindi cinema. He was a recipient of National Film Award for Best Cinematography for the 1976 Malayalam film Mohiniyaattam.He is the second Keralite to win the national honor after Mankada Ravi Varma. He was a frequent collaborator with Bharathiraja and they worked together in 8 films.

== Life ==
Born in Panayam parambil, East Nadakkavu, Calicut, Nivas graduated from the St. Joseph's College, Devagiri and went on to do a diploma in motion picture photography from the Institute of Film Technology, Adyar, Madras.

== Career ==
Nivas started his film career as an operative camera man in P. N. Menon's Malayalam film, Kuttyedathi (1971). He apprenticed under Ashok Kumar in films such as Mappusakshi (1972), Chembarathi (1972) and Babu Nanthankode's Dhakam(1972) Swapnam (1973). His first film as an independent cinematographer was Sathyathinte Nizhalil (1975), directed by Babu Nanthankode. Nivas was awarded the National Film Award for Best Cinematography (Black and White) for the 1976 Malayalam film Mohiniyaattam. In 1978, he won the Nandi Award for Best Cinematographer the Telugu film, Nimajjanam.

Nivas made his Tamil cinema debut with Bharathiraja's 16 Vayathinile (1977), which was also the latter's directorial debut. He went on to work with the director in films such as Kizhake Pogum Rail (1978), Sigappu Rojakkal (1978), Solva Sawan (1978) and Puthiya Vaarpugal (1979). Between 1977 and 1980, he worked on seven Bharathiraja films, including five consecutively. He also photographed C. V. Sridhar's Ilamai Oonjal Aadukirathu and its Telugu remake, Vayasu Pilichindi (1978). He also worked with K. Viswanath in Saagara Sangamam (1983).

Nivas died on 1 February 2021, in Calicut.

== Filmography ==
=== As assistant cinematographer ===
- Kuttyedathi (1971)
- Chemparathi (1972)
- Mappusakshi (1972)
- Dhakam (1974)

=== As cinematographer ===
==== Malayalam ====
- Sathyathinte Nizhalil
- Sindooram
- Madhuram Thirumadhuram
- Mohiniyaattam
- Sankhupushpam
- Rajaparambara
- Sooryakanthi
- Pallavi
- Rajan Paranja Kadha
- Padmatheertham
- Velluvili
- Lisa (1978)
- Sarppam
- Maanyamahaajanangale
- Veendum Lisa
- Ayushman Bhava

==== Tamil ====
- 16 Vayathinile (1977)
- Kizhake Pogum Rail (1978)
- Sigappu Rojakkal (1978)
- Ilamai Oonjal Aadukirathu (1978)
- Puthiya Vaarpugal (1979)
- Niram Maaratha Pookkal (1979)
- Kallukkul Eeram (1980)
- Enakkaga Kaathiru (1981)
- Nizhal Thedum Nenjangal (1981)
- Kozhi Koovuthu (1982 film) (1982)
- Thanikattu Raja (1982)
- Kokkarakko (1983)
- My Dear Lisa (1987)
- Sembakame Sembakame (1988)
- Enga Ooru Mappillai (1989)
- Ooru Vittu Ooru Vanthu (1990)
- Pass Mark (1994)
- Sevvanthi (1994)
- En Paadal Unakkaga

==== Telugu ====
- Vayasu Pilichindi
- Nimajjanam
- Punadi Rallu - Actor Chiranjeevi's debut movie
- Saagara Sangamam
- Sankeerthana
- Hanthakudi Veta (1987)
- Nani

==== Hindi ====
- Solva Saawan
- Red Rose
- Bhayaanak Mahal (1989

=== As director ===
- Kallukkul Eeram (1980) - Bharathiraja plays himself in this movie
- Enakkaga Kaathiru (1981)
- Nizhal Thedum Nenjangal (1982)
- Sevvanthi (1994)
