= Sindoora Sandhyakku Mounam =

- Directed by: I. V. Sasi
- Written by: Priyadarshan (Uncredited) T. Damodaran
- Produced by: V. B. K. Menon
- Starring: Lakhsmi; Madhavi; Ratheesh; Mohanlal; Kuthiravattom Pappu; Prathap Pothen
- Cinematography: C. E. Babu; S. S. Chandramohan
- Edited by: K. Narayanan
- Music by: Shyam
- Production company: Marunadan Films
- Release date: 3 December 1982
- Running time: 120 minutes
- Country: India
- Language: Malayalam

Sindoora Sandhyakku Mounam (transl. The Silence of the Crimson Dusk) is a 1982 Indian Malayalam film directed by I. V. Sasi and written by Priyadarshan based the Hollywood title Psych-Out. The film stars Lakhsmi, Madhavi, Ratheesh, Mohanlal, Kuthiravattom Pappu and Prathap Pothen. The whole film is set in the city of Kathmandu.

== Cast ==
- Ratheesh as Vinod
- Mohanlal as Kishor
- Kuthiravattom Pappu as Chandran
- Prathap Pothen as Anil aka Raju
- Balan K. Nair as Sekhar
- Raveendran as Kumar
- Kunchan as Prem Anand
- Lakhsmi as Deepthi
- Madhavi as Siji
- Surekha as Kumar's fiancée
- Sathyakala as Deepthi's Mother
- Sathyachitra as Deepthi's step mother
- Jaffer Khan
- Jayanthi
- Mammootty as Deepthi's father (cameo)
- Seema as Seema (cameo)

== Plot ==
Deepthi and Raju, who are siblings lives separately after their parents divorced. However, Deepthi faces many challenges when she goes in search of Raju after many years.

== Soundtrack ==
The music was composed by Shyam and the lyrics were written by Bichu Thirumala.

No.	Song	Singers	Lyrics	Length (m:ss)
1	"Aakashagangayil Varnangalaal (D)	S. Janaki, Krishnachandran	Bichu Thirumala	
2	"Aakashagangayil Varnangalaal" (F)	S. Janaki, Chorus	Bichu Thirumala	
3	"Kelilolam Thooval"	K. J. Yesudas, S. Janaki	Bichu Thirumala	
4	"Leelarangam"	S. Janaki, P. Jayachandran	Bichu Thirumala	
5	"Shaaleenayaam Saralprasaadame"	K. J. Yesudas, S. Janaki	Bichu Thirumala	
6	"There Was a Woman"	K. J. Yesudas	Bichu Thirumala	

== Trivia ==
- This was one of the first screenplays of Priyadarshan, based on the American title Psych-Out. But only after release, he realized that someone else was credited for his work. Earlier, Psych-Out was remade in Hindi by Devanand, entitled Hare Rama Hare Krishna. it's not first time he faced such a bitter experience. Earlier that year he drafted Kadathu, which was directed by P. G. Viswambharan. When the movie screened in the theratre he noticed credit had gone to the director himself.

== view the film ==
- sindoora sandhyakku mounam on YouTube
