= Raman Sreeraman =

- Poster
- Directed by: Prasad T. K.
- Screenplay by: Prasad T. K.
- Produced by: Babu K.
- Starring: Vijayakanth; Jyothi; Vanitha; Sathyaraj
- Cinematography: Ramesh
- Music by: Sivaji Raja
- Production company: RB Creations
- Release date: 23 March 1985
- Running time: 135 minutes
- Country: India
- Language: Tamil

Raman Sreeraman is a 1985 Indian Tamil-language action thriller film, directed by Prasad T. K. and produced by Babu K. The film stars Vijayakanth and Jyothi, the former in dual roles. It was released on 23 March 1985, and failed at the box office.

== Plot ==
Vijay is a well-known good samaritan businessman. On the day after his wedding, he is stopped by his wife's ex-lover Shankar, who wishes them well in a sarcastic manner. Soon, Shankar starts black-mailing Vidya often. Vidya denies that they were ex-college-mates and keeps quiet because Shankar is the brother of Vidya's friend, Saradha. However, Vijay does not believe Shankar's stories and believes his wife Vidya. He also employs Shankar in his company as assistant manager and informs Vidya that Shankar will not disturb them again. One day, Vijay receives a phone call while playing tennis with his judge friend and receives the news that his cashier was murdered by Shankar. Shankar denies the accusation and confesses that it was Vijay who actually committed the murder.

Vidya, who later decides to help her friend Saradha, meets Shankar in prison. Shankar tells Vidya that he changed into a good person the moment Vijay offered him a job. However, since he saw Vijay murder the cashier himself and escape with the motorcycle plate number TMC 7979, he denies Vidya the idea that Vijay is a good person. After Vidya returns home, Vijay informs that his motorcycle number plate TMC 7979 is missing. Vidya starts suspecting Vijay, her husband.

One night, Vijay is shown to be drunk and having an affair with Saradha. Saradha took this opportunity to take revenge on Vijay. Later, Vidya receives a call from the hotel, that Vijay is heavily drunk and asks to pick him up. However, once Vidya reaches the hotel, she is informed that Vijay went back with his wife. This further confuses Vidya.

What happens next? Is Vijay the true murderer? Is he pretending to be a good person or is it Shankar who committed the murder?

== Cast ==
- Vijayakanth in a dual role as
  - Vijay
  - Sanjay
- Jyothi as Vidya
- Sathyaraj as Shankar
- Vanitha Krishnachandran as Saradha, Shankar's Sister and Vidya's friend
- Goundamani
- Anuradha
- Vennira Aadai Moorthy

== Soundtrack ==
The music was composed by Sivaji Raja.

Track listing
No.	Title	Singer(s)	Length
1.	"Kanni Thendral"	S. P. Balasubrahmanyam, P. Susheela	4:09
2.	"Roja Rathirikku"	Vani Jairam	4:16
3.	"Ayya Ayya"	Malaysia Vasudevan, S. P. Sailaja	4:07
4.	"Naalum Romba"	Malaysia Vasudevan, T. K. Kala	4:11
Total length:			16:43
