= Abhimanyu (1989 film) =

- Poster
- Directed by: Tony Juneja
- Screenplay by: Gyandev Agnihotri
- Based on: Sakalakala Vallavan (Tamil)
- Produced by: Tito
- Starring: Anil Kapoor; Poonam Dhillon; Kimi Katkar
- Cinematography: Jal Mistry
- Music by: Anu Malik
- Release date: 8 June 1989
- Running time: 168 minutes
- Country: India
- Language: Hindi

Abhimanyu is a 1989 Indian Hindi-language action drama film directed by Tony Juneja. The film stars Anil Kapoor, Kimi Katkar, Poonam Dhillon and Anita Raj. It is a remake of the 1982 Tamil film Sakalakala Vallavan. It was a flop despite being a satisfactory opening.

== Cast ==
- Anil Kapoor as Manu / Abhimanyu America Puri / Abdul Jabbar
- Poonam Dhillon as Tulsi / Miss California 'Kelly'
- Kimi Katkar as Geeta
- Anita Raj as Lalita
- Aruna Irani as Parvati (Ram's wife)
- Prem Chopra as Ram Babu
- Shakti Kapoor as Pannalal 'Panni' Double Horse Power
- Shafi Inamdar aa G.S. Parmeswaran
- Jagdeep as Pyarelal / Jack
- A.K. Hangal as Shyam Lal
- Guddi Maruti as Baby (Geeta's Friend)

== Music ==
1. "CHandni Raat Hai" - Anuradha Paudwal, Amit Kumar
2. "Kangna Khanke" - Anwar, Munmi Borah
3. "Fire Brigade" - Alka Yagnik, Amit Kumar
4. "I Am The Best" - Alka Yagnik, Amit Kumar
5. "Phate Na Meri Dosti" - Shabbir Kumar
6. "Puarana Mera Khunta" - Alka Yagnik
