= Mansoru Maha Samudram =

- Directed by: P. K. Joseph
- Written by: Kanam E. J.
- Screenplay by: Kanam E. J.
- Starring: Mammootty; Ratheesh; Aruna; K. P. Ummer
- Edited by: K. Sankunni
- Music by: M. K. Arjunan
- Production company: KMM Movies
- Distributed by: KMM Movies
- Release date: 25 March 1983
- Country: India
- Language: Malayalam

Mansoru Maha Samudram is a 1983 Indian Malayalam-language film, directed by P. K. Joseph. The film stars Mammootty, Ratheesh, Aruna and K. P. Ummer. The film has musical score by M. K. Arjunan.

== Cast ==
- Mammootty as Venugopal
- Ratheesh as Sanjayan
- Aruna as Renuka
- K. P. Ummer as Ranjini's father
- Seema as Ranjini
- Philomina as Renuka's mother
- Jagathy Sreekumar as Raghavan
- Kaviyoor Ponnamma as Devaki
- Sreenivasan as Pappu
- Lalithasree as Meenakshi
- Santo Krishnan

== Soundtrack ==
The music was composed by M. K. Arjunan and the lyrics were written by Kanam E. J.

No.	Song	Singers	Lyrics	Length (m:ss)
1	"Kunnin Purangalil"	K. J. Yesudas	Kanam E. J.	
2	"Manassoru Samudram"	K. J. Yesudas	Kanam E. J.	
3	"Suravalli Vidarum"	K. J. Yesudas	Kanam E. J.	
4	"Thudakkam"	S. Janaki, Chorus	Kanam E. J.	
