= Toorpu Velle Railu =

- Theatrical release poster
- Directed by: Bapu
- Written by: M. V. L. (dialogues)
- Story by: R. Selvaraj
- Produced by: V. Perraju
- Starring: Jyothi; Mohan
- Cinematography: Ishaan Arya
- Music by: S. P. Balasubrahmanyam
- Production company: Triveni Art Pictures
- Release date: 25 August 1979
- Country: India
- Language: Telugu

Toorpu Velle Railu (transl. Eastbound Train) is a 1979 Indian Telugu-language film directed by Bapu. The film stars Jyothi (in her debut) and Mohan (in his Telugu debut). It is a remake of the Tamil film Kizhakke Pogum Rail. The film was released on 25 August 1979.

== Cast ==
- Jyothi as Alivelu
- Mohan as Ramakoti
- Kakarala
- Sakshi Ranga Rao as a priest
- Rallapalli as Sivudu
- Vikram
- M. B. K. V. Prasad Rao
- Dhanalakshmi
- Sumangali
- Dham
- Ashok Kumar

== Soundtrack ==
The music was composed by S. P. Balasubrahmanyam, who also sang all the songs. The lyrics were written by Aarudra and Jaladi Raja Rao.

Track listing
| No. | Title | Singer(s) | Length |
|---|---|---|---|
| 1. | "Chuttu Chengavi Cheera" | S. P. Balasubrahmanyam | 3:19 |
| 2. | "Emitidi Emitidi Edo Teliyanidi" | P.Susheela | 3:21 |
| 3. | "Kanne Maa Chinnari" | P.Susheela | 3:26 |
| 4. | "Ko Ante Koyilamma Koko" | S. P. Balasubrahmanyam | 3:24 |
| 5. | "Neetibotlu Neetibotlu Paatala Kanneetibotlu" | S. P. Balasubrahmanyam | 3:12 |
| 6. | "Sandepoddu Andalunna Chinnadee" | S. P. Balasubrahmanyam P.Susheela | 3:03 |
| 7. | "Vasthade Naa Raaju" | S. P. Sailaja | 3:31 |
| 8. | "Veguchukka Podichindi" | S. P. Balasubrahmanyam | 3:06 |
| Total length: | | | 26:22 |

== Reception ==
Prasad of Zamin Ryot wrote that Bapu has a kind of respect for the Telugu audience. It is his responsibility to maintain it. Is it our intention to start making such inferior stories into films, to lose that honour. Griddaluru Gopalrao of the same newspaper wrote that Toorpu Velle Railu is a moral development for the progress of the nation and a comprehensive review for a democratic system (which isn't all about for money and calls for innovation). The reviewer added that the movie resonates with the hearts of poor people, focuses on them, and is like a new poem that sheds light on their lives.
