= Surya Kiran (director) =

Indian director (1974–2024)

- Born: Suresh; 6 September 1974; Chennai, Tamil Nadu, India
- Died: 11 March 2024 (aged 49); Chennai, Tamil Nadu, India
- Other name: Master Suresh
- Occupations: Film director, actor
- Years active: 1978 – 2020
- Spouse: Kalyani (divorced)
- Relatives: Sujitha (sister)

Surya Kiran (6 September 1974 – 11 March 2024) was an Indian director and actor who worked in Telugu and Tamil-language films. He was known for directing Satyam. He died on 11 March 2024 due to jaundice and other complications.

== Career ==
Kiran worked as a child actor in 200 films under the stage name Master Suresh. Surya Kiran made his directorial debut with the successful Satyam (2003) and went on to direct other Telugu-language films. In a review of Satyam, one critic praised his direction and called it a highlight of the film. He participated in the Telugu reality show Bigg Boss 4 and was the first contestant to get eliminated. He planned to make a comeback as a director in 2017, but the film was stuck in development limbo.

== Personal life ==
Surya Kiran was born to father T. S. Mani and mother Radha at Chennai, Tamil Nadu. His family is from Trivandrum, Kerala. His younger sister Sujitha Dhanush is also an actress. Kiran was briefly married to Kalyani before they divorced.

== Death ==
He died from jaundice at a hospital in Chennai, on 11 March 2024 at 9:30am, at the age of 49.

== Partial filmography ==
As an actor

- Snehikkan Oru Pennu (1978) (Malayalam)
- Kallukkul Eeram (1980) (Tamil)
- Savithiri (1980) (Tamil)
- Thee (1981) (Tamil) (uncredited)
- Mouna Geethangal (1981) (Tamil)
- Sathyabhama (1981) (Telugu)
- Kadal Meengal (1981) (Tamil) (uncredited)
- Ranga (1982) (Tamil)
- Nandri Meendum Varuga (1982) (Tamil)
- Darling, Darling, Darling (1982) (Tamil)
- Nizhal Thedum Nenjangal (1982) (Tamil)
- Mundhanai Mudichu (1983) (Tamil)
- My Dear Kuttichathan (1984) (Malayalam)
- Nallavanukku Nallavan (1984) (Tamil)
- Deivapiravi (1985) (Tamil)
- Geraftaar (1985) (Hindi)
- Neethiyin Marupakkam (1985) (Tamil)
- Mangamma Sabadham (1985) (Tamil)
- Babu (1985) (Hindi)
- Padikkadavan (1985) (Tamil)
- Dosti Dushmani (1986) (Hindi)
- Rakshasudu (1986) (Telugu)
- Manithan (1987) (Tamil)
- Donga Mogudu (1987) (Telugu)
- Swayam Krushi (1987) (Telugu)
- Velaikkaran (1987) (Tamil)
- Sankeertana (1987) (Telugu)
- Khaidi No. 786 (1988) (Telugu)
- Veguchukka Pagatichukka (1988) (Telugu)
- Mappillai Sir (1988) (Tamil)
- Sonthakkaran (1989) (Tamil)
- Kondaveeti Donga (1990) (Telugu)

As a director

- Satyam (2003) (Telugu)
- Dhana 51 (2005) (Telugu)
- Brahmastram (2006) (Telugu)
- Raju Bhai (2007) (Telugu)
- Chapter 6 (2010) (Telugu)

Television

- Bigg Boss (Telugu season 4) (2020)
