= Kutravaaligal =

- Directed by: Rama Narayanan
- Written by: Rama Narayanan (dialogues)
- Screenplay by: Ramesh
- Produced by: Selvam
- Starring: Raveendran; Viji; Raghuvaran
- Cinematography: N. K. Viswanathan
- Edited by: P. Venkateswara Rao
- Music by: Shankar–Ganesh
- Production company: Poompuhar Productions
- Release date: 7 June 1985
- Country: India
- Language: Tamil

Kutravaaligal (transl. Criminals) is a 1985 Indian Tamil-language crime film directed by Rama Narayanan. The film stars Raveendran, Viji and Raghuvaran. It was released on 7 June 1985.

== Cast ==
- Raveendran
- Viji
- Raghuvaran
- Jayamalini
- Radha Ravi

== Soundtrack ==
The music was composed by Shankar–Ganesh.

Track listing
No.	Title	Lyrics	Singer(s)	Length
1.	"Iravile Nilavile"	Vairamuthu	S. P. Balasubrahmanyam, S. P. Sailaja
2.	"Ketti Melam"	Vaali	S. P. Sailaja
3.	"Aadunna"	Vaali	S. P. Sailaja
4.	"Ella Payalum"	Vaali	Malaysia Vasudevan

== Reception ==
Jayamanmadhan of Kalki gave a negative review panning the story and acting.
