= Velluvili =

- CD Cover
- Directed by: K. G. Rajasekharan
- Written by: Pappanamkodu Lakshmanan
- Produced by: T. V. Vijayaraghavan
- Starring: Soman; Jayabharathi
- Cinematography: P. S. Nivas
- Edited by: V. P. Krishnan
- Music by: M. S. Viswanathan; Lyrics: Bichu Thirumala
- Production company: Chandhamani Films
- Release date: 24 February 1978
- Country: India
- Language: Malayalam

Velluvili (English: Challenge) is a 1978 Malayalam film, starring Soman and Jayabharathi in the lead roles. It marked the directorial debut of K. G. Rajasekharan. It was shot mostly at Perumbavoor, Kerala.

The film was released along with the Prem Nazir-starrer Kalpavriksham. It became a commercial success and provided a career break for Soman.

== Cast ==
- Jayabharathi as Lakshmi
- Jose Prakash as Minnal Moidu
- Prema as Parvathi
- K. P. Ummer
- M. G. Soman as Soman
- Paravoor Bharathan as Naanu
- Sadhana as Sarojini
- Ushakumari as Savithri
- Master Raghu as Pappan
- Janardhanan as Sreedharan
- K. P. A. C. Lalitha as Sarasu
- Pattom Sadan as Kuttappan

== Soundtrack ==
The music was composed by M. S. Viswanathan and the lyrics were written by Bichu Thirumala.

No.	Song	Singers	Lyrics	Length (m:ss)
1	"Katturumbe Vaayaadi"	K. J. Yesudas	Bichu Thirumala	
2	"Mukilukale"	S. Janaki	Bichu Thirumala	
3	"Onam Vanne"	Bichu Thirumala, P. Jayachandran, Ambili, K. P. Chandramohan	Bichu Thirumala	
4	"Vasanthakaala Viharam"	K. J. Yesudas	Bichu Thirumala	
