= Ilamai Oonjal Aadukirathu =

1978 film by C. V. Sridhar

- Film poster
- Directed by: C. V. Sridhar
- Written by: C. V. Sridhar
- Produced by: Kannaiyaa
- Starring: Kamal Haasan; Rajinikanth; Sripriya; Jayachitra
- Cinematography: P. S. Nivas
- Edited by: Kotagiri Gopalrao
- Music by: Ilaiyaraaja
- Production company: Sri Chitra
- Release dates: 9 June 1978 (Tamil); 4 August 1978 (Telugu)
- Running time: 141–150 minutes
- Country: India
- Languages: Tamil; Telugu

Ilamai Oonjal Aadukirathu (transl. Youth is swinging) is a 1978 Indian Tamil-language romance film written and directed by C. V. Sridhar. The film stars Kamal Haasan, Rajinikanth, Sripriya and Jayachitra. It focuses on two women falling in love with the same man.

Ilamai Oonjal Aadukirathu was simultaneously shot in Telugu as Vayasu Pilichindi (transl. Youth is calling), with much of the same cast. The film was released on 9 June 1978 in Tamil, and on 4 August the same year in Telugu. It ran for 175 days in theatres and won the Tamil Nadu State Film Award for Third Best Film. Sridhar remade the film in Hindi as Dil-e-Nadaan (1982).

== Plot ==
Prabhu, an orphan, is brought up by his friend Murali's mother and is the general manager for Murali's marketing agency at Madras. Murali treats Prabhu not just as a friend, but as a brother and depends on him for all business decisions. Prabhu is in love with Padma, a college student. Padma's relative Jayanthi is a young widow who works at Murali's office. Murali, an alcoholic with a roving eye, is not aware of Prabhu's love for Padma. Padma is the only girl who rejects Murali's advances. Though Jayanthi knows about the love affair between Prabhu and Padma, Prabhu's presence stimulates her sexually. Once she accompanies Prabhu and Padma for a film screening and unable to control her sexual feelings, comes out. Murali offers her a lift in his car; both get excited in the privacy of the car, but suddenly feel guilty about the incident.

A disturbed Jayanthi avails leave and goes to her village and Padma joins her, as Prabhu goes on an official tour. Prabhu, planning to surprise Padma, proceeds to Jayanthi's village to meet Padma. When Prabhu lands at Jayanthi's home, she is alone as Padma has gone to attend a wedding in a nearby village. Jayanthi convinces Prabhu to stay back overnight, so that he can meet Padma the next day. Jayanthi arouses Prabhu in the night and they make love. Prabhu, feeling guilty about the whole event, writes a letter of apology to Jayanthi and leaves. Devastated to read the note when she returns to Jayanthi's house, Padma returns to Madras, where she starts distancing herself from Prabhu without revealing why.

Murali continues to pursue Padma. When she falls down, he saves her and gets her admitted in a hospital, impressing her father. Murali happily informs Prabhu about his feelings for Padma; being a good friend and grateful for the help given by Murali's family, Prabhu remains silent. He accompanies Murali's mother to formally propose Murali's marriage with Padma. Padma's father accepts the proposal, and Padma remains silent. When Prabhu confronts her, she reveals that she had read his letter to Jayanthi, who is carrying his child. Shocked with the news, Prabhu leaves Madras without informing Murali and his mother and they feel upset thinking Prabhu is angry with them. Later Jayanthi writes a letter to Prabhu informing him of her pregnancy. Murali reads the letter and now knows why Prabhu left abruptly. Enraged, he severs ties with Prabhu then and there.

Prabhu searches for Jayanthi and finds her in Bangalore. He makes arrangements to marry her, but she has an accident. Before she dies, he ties a thaali around her neck, giving her the dignity of a wife. He relocates to Ooty. Meanwhile, Murali and Padma's wedding is postponed, as Murali falls ill and is advised rest by his doctor. He and Padma come to an estate on holiday, unaware that Prabhu works there. Prabhu meets them without realising that Murali knows about him and Jayanthi and apologises to Murali for leaving their home suddenly. While Murali is in no mood to forgive him, Padma, on learning that Prabhu married Jayanthi before she died, forgives him and tries to become close to him again.

Murali sees Padma and Prabhu together. Enraged, he takes Prabhu to a cliff; when he is about to shoot him, Padma reveals that they were originally in love and how they broke up due to Jayanthi's interference and Prabhu's honourable act in making Jayanthi his wife and legitimising their child, before she died. Murali and Prabhu reconcile, and Murali presents Padma to Prabhu as he knows they truly love each other, and leaves for Madras.

== Cast ==
- Kamal Haasan as Prabhu
- Rajinikanth as Murali
- Sripriya as Padma
- Jayachitra as Jayanthi
- Y. G. Parthasarathy as Padma's father (Tamil)
- Raavi Kondala Rao as Padma's father (Telugu)
- V. Gopalakrishnan as the doctor (Tamil)
- Sakshi Ranga Rao as the doctor (Telugu)
- A. K. Veerasamy as Jayanthi's father (Tamil)
- Vankayala Satyanarayana as Jayanthi's father (Telugu)
- Kantha Rao as Narayan (Tamil) / Fernandes (Telugu)
- Nirmalamma as Annapoorani
- Pushpakumari
- Jayasheela

== Production ==
Ilamai Oonjal Aadukirathu was produced under the banner Sri Chitra and directed by C. V. Sridhar, who also wrote its story and screenplay. It was also the first collaboration between him and Rajinikanth. It was Kamal Haasan who recommended Rajinikanth for the film; Jai Ganesh was the initial choice for Rajinikanth's role. Sridhar initially wanted to do this film with different actors; however his assistants P. Vasu and Santhana Bharathi wanted Rajinikanth and Kamal Haasan, and though Sridhar was initially against their decision, he later agreed to cast them. Editing was handled by Kotagiri Gopalrao, and cinematography by P. S. Nivas. Though Jayachitra was hesitant to act in the film, she was convinced by Sridhar. Due to her commitments to other films, she gave only a few call-sheet dates. The film was simultaneously produced in Telugu as Vayasu Pilichindi, with much of the cast.

== Soundtrack ==
The music was composed by Ilaiyaraaja and the lyrics were written by Vaali for the Tamil version. The song "Ore Naal Unnai Naan" is set in the Carnatic raga known as Pahadi, and "Kinnaththil Then" is set in Vakulabharanam. Jazz trumpeter Frank Dubier and gospel trumpeter Stephen Lazarus played the instruments in the disco song "Ennadi Meenakshi". The song "Thanni Karuthirichu" was used in Vayasu Pilichindi as "Mabbe Massagesindile", which was remixed by Achu Rajamani for the Telugu film Nenu Meeku Telusa? (2009). When this film was dubbed in Tamil as Ennai Theriyuma?, the original Tamil version was remixed. A remix version of "Ennadi Meenakshi" is featured on music artist M. Rafi's album Aasaiyae Alaipolae.

In May 2015, musician Bharadwaj commented on "Ennadi Meenakshi", "I've always believed that songs should express some emotion, some feeling. This song is a perfect example of what I believe in. It's simple, yet so dramatic. The element of drama in this song is so inherent to this film."

Tamil track listing
No.	Title	Singer(s)	Length
1.	"Ennadi Meenakshi"	S. P. Balasubrahmanyam	4:00
2.	"Ore Naal Unnai Naan"	S. P. Balasubrahmanyam, Vani Jairam	4:24
3.	"Kinnaththil Then"	K. J. Yesudas, S. Janaki	3:54
4.	"Nee Kettaal Naan"	Vani Jairam	4:33
5.	"Thanni Karuthiruchi"	Malaysia Vasudevan	4:21
Total length:			21:12

Telugu track listing
No.	Title	Lyrics	Singer(s)	Length
1.	"Elage Elage"	Aarudra	P. Susheela, S. P. Balasubrahmanyam
2.	"Hello My Rita"	Veeturi	S. P. Balasubrahmanyam
3.	"Nuvvadigindi"	Veeturi	Vani Jairam
4.	"Mabbe Massagesindile"	Veeturi	S. P. Balasubrahmanyam
5.	"Jeevitha Madhusaala"	Veeturi	V. Ramakrishna, S. Janaki

== Release and reception ==
Ilamai Oonjal Aadukirathu was released on 9 June 1978, and Vayasu Pilichindi on 4 August the same year. The Review Board of Ananda Vikatan, in a review dated 25 June 1978, rated the former a rating of 57.5 out of 100, praising Sridhar's screenplay and the limited usage of dialogues. The Board wrote that Sridhar proved that Tamil films could be made without a comedy subplot and a separate villain. Kousigan of Kalki praised Nivas' cinematography but took issues with the overuse of English dialogues. He also appreciated the film for not having a comedy subplot, action sequences or masala. The film was a commercial success, running for 175 days in theatres, and won the Tamil Nadu State Film Award for Third Best Film.

== Bibliography ==
- Dhananjayan, G. (2011). The Best of Tamil Cinema, 1931 to 2010: 1977–2010. Galatta Media. OCLC 733724281.
- Dharap, B. V. (1978). Indian Films. Motion Picture Enterprises.
- Ramachandran, Naman (2014) [2012]. Rajinikanth: The Definitive Biography. Penguin Books. ISBN 978-81-8475-796-5.
- Sundararaman (2007) [2005]. Raga Chintamani: A Guide to Carnatic Ragas Through Tamil Film Music (2nd ed.). Pichhamal Chintamani. OCLC 295034757.
