= Vikatakavi =

- Directed by: Hariharan
- Written by: Hariharan
- Produced by: Dr. Balakrishnan; George
- Starring: Prem Nazir; Madhavi; Mammootty
- Cinematography: Vipin Das
- Edited by: M. S. Mani
- Music by: Devarajan
- Production companies: Murali Films; Aishwaryadhara
- Distributed by: Murali & Benny Release
- Release date: 12 January 1984
- Country: India
- Language: Malayalam

Vikatakavi is a 1984 Malayalam film, written and directed by Hariharan. It stars Prem Nazir, Madhavi and Mammootty in the lead roles. The film's music has been composed by Devarajan, with lyrics by P. Bhaskaran.

== Cast ==
- Prem Nazir as Sankunni Nair
- Madhavi as Santhi
- Mammootty as Usman
- Balan K. Nair
- T. G. Ravi as Krishnankutty/ K. K. Nair
- Swapna as Sudha
- Sukumari as Ayisha
- Kuthiravattam Pappu as Adruman
- Bahadoor as Avaran
- Vanitha Krishnachandran as Nabeesa
- Rajkumar Sethupathi as Sasi
- Aranmula Ponnamma as Sankunni's mother
- Pattom Sadan as Lohithakshan
- Lalithasree as Lalitha
- Janardhanan as Mahesh
- Vincent as S. P. Ramesh
- Sadhana as Mrs. Nair
- Radhamani as Narayani

== Soundtrack ==
The music was composed by G. Devarajan and the lyrics were written by P. Bhaskaran.

No.	Song	Singers	Lyrics	Length (m:ss)
1	"Kadicha Chundu"	K. J. Yesudas, P. Madhuri	P. Bhaskaran	
2	"Mankappenne"	K. J. Yesudas	P. Bhaskaran	
3	"Oru Kannil"	K. J. Yesudas, P. Madhuri	P. Bhaskaran	
4	"Sankalpa Nandana"	K. J. Yesudas, P. Susheela	P. Bhaskaran	
