= Unnai Thedi Varuven =

- Poster
- Directed by: C. V. Sridhar
- Written by: C. V. Sridhar
- Produced by: K. R. Gangadharan
- Starring: Suresh; Nalini; Sadhana; Vinoth
- Cinematography: P. Bhaskar Rao
- Edited by: K. R. Ramalingam
- Music by: Ilaiyaraaja
- Production company: KRG Film Circuit
- Release date: 5 July 1985
- Country: India
- Language: Tamil

Unnai Thedi Varuven (transl. I will come searching for you) is a 1985 Indian Tamil-language thriller film directed by C. V. Sridhar and produced by K. R. Gangadharan. The film stars Suresh, Nalini, Sadhana and Vinoth. It was released on 5 July 1985, and became a commercial success.

== Plot ==
Devi and Anitha are best friends that are in Anitha's home alone when a killer on the run enters the home. He is running from the police after killing his ex-girlfriend and plans on hiding at the house. The young women capture him and he's arrested but nurses a grudge against them. Anitha is rich and funds Devi's education. Devi lives with her brother and sister-in-law. As her education is funded by Anitha, Devi feels a sense of obligation towards her friend. The two run into Anand, a happy-go-lucky dancer and Anitha falls for him. Anand, however, loves Devi and she reciprocates. Anand and Devi marry just as the killer escapes prison intent on getting revenge on the two women. Anitha and Devi must somehow escape the killer's clutches.

== Cast ==
- Suresh as Anand
- Nalini as Devi
- Sadhana as Anitha
- Vinoth as the Vinoth (Killer)
- Disco Shanti as Padma
- Thengai Srinivasan as Venkatachalam
- Manorama as Sundari
- Nizhalgal Ravi
- J.Lalitha as Kamala

== Production ==
Unnai Thedi Varuven was produced by K. R. Gangadharan under KRG Film Circuit and directed by C. V. Sridhar, who also wrote the story. The comedy subplot featuring Thengai Srinivasan and Manorama was written by Sridhar's longtime associate Chithralaya Gopu. Cinematography was handled by P. Bhaskar Rao, and the editing by K. R. Ramalingam.

== Soundtrack ==
The soundtrack was composed by Ilaiyaraaja.

Track listing
| No. | Title | Lyrics | Singer(s) | Length |
|---|---|---|---|---|
| 1. | "Oru Naanil" | Vairamuthu | S. Janaki, Ramesh | 4:29 |
| 2. | "Maalai Muthal" | Vaali | Vani Jairam | 4:25 |
| 3. | "En Anbe" | Vaali | S. Janaki, S. P. Balasubrahmanyam | 4:41 |
| 4. | "Endiyamma Keli" | Vaali | S. P. Balasubrahmanyam | 4:38 |
| 5. | "Valiya Vantha" | Gangai Amaran | S. P. Balasubrahmanyam | 4:32 |
| Total length: | | | | 22:45 |

== Release and reception ==
Unnai Thedi Varuven was released on 5 July 1985. Jayamanmadhan of Kalki said the suspense element in the film was weak, and was like sambar and payasam mixed together. The film became a commercial success.
