= Mudivalla Arambam =

- Title card
- Directed by: N. M. Mohideen
- Written by: N. M. Mohideen
- Produced by: N. M. Mohideen
- Starring: Rajesh; Jyothi
- Cinematography: R.M. Ramesh
- Edited by: V. Rajagopal
- Music by: Ilaiyaraaja
- Production company: N. M. Enterprises
- Release date: 30 March 1984
- Country: India
- Language: Tamil

Mudivalla Arambam (transl. Not the end, but the beginning) is a 1984 Indian Tamil-language film directed by N. M. Mohideen. The film stars Rajesh and Jyothi, with Sarath Babu, Kumarimuthu and Master Haja Sharif in supporting roles. It was released on 30 March 1984.

== Plot ==
Radha, the daughter of a woman who runs a roadside tea stall in a hill village, is educated up to the tenth grSW. Kannaiah, a cargo driver, often visits the tea shop on the way. Both fall in love with each other. Before marriage, the two become physically united. As a result, Radha becomes pregnant and hey fix the wedding date. Before that, Kannaiah, who went away on his business, did not return. Radha gives birth to a baby without marriage. She leaves the baby at the door of a charity home, unnoticed, and then joins the same charity home, naming herself as Sita. Her child named John grows up here. A doctor named Ram falls in love with Sita. At some point it becomes clear to everyone that Sita and John are mother and son. After a while, Kannaiah is admitted to a hospital there after losing his sight in an accident during Ram and Sita's wedding. Ram is working in the same hospital and Ram performs an operation to restore Kannaiah's eyesight. The final scene is after Kannaiah's sight returns, to whom Sita joins, either Kannaiya or Ram for marriage.

== Cast ==
- Rajesh
- Jyothi
- Sarath Babu
- Kumarimuthu
- Master Haja Sharif

== Soundtrack ==
The soundtrack was composed by Ilaiyaraaja. The song "Thennankeethum Thendral Kaatrum" is set to the raga Mayamalavagowla.

Title	Singers	Lyrics
"Padi Va Thendrale"	P. Jayachandran	Vairamuthu
"Thennankeethum Thendral Kaatrum"	P. Susheela, Malaysia Vasudevan	Vairamuthu
"Then Eduka Ponan"	Malaysia Vasudevan, S. P. Sailaja	Gangai Amaran
"Aasaina Aasai"	Gangai Amaran, Ramesh, Saibaba, Deepan Chakravarthy & Krishnachandran	Ravi

== Reception ==
Jayamanmadhan of Kalki praised the director for making an emotional film while also adding necessary commercial elements. They also appreciated the acting of cast especially Junior Balaiah, Ilayaraja's music and dialogues.
