= Mucherla Aruna =

Indian actress

- Born: Kothagudem, Andhra Pradesh, India
- Occupations: Influencer; actress
- Years active: 1980–1990
- Spouse: Mohan (m. 1987)
- Children: 4

Mucherla Aruna is an Indian influencer and former actress who worked in Telugu, Tamil, Malayalam and Kannada films, mainly during the 1980s.

== Early life and career ==
Mucherla Aruna hails from Arjunudupalem, near Tanuku West Godavari district of Andhra Pradesh. She was brought up in Chennai and Hyderabad.

She made her debut in the Tamil film titled Kallukkul Eeram by Bharathiraja which was released in 1980. She has been frequently paired with actor Vijayakanth in Sivappu Malli, Needhi Pizhaithathu, Sattam Sirikkiradhu, and Kanalukku Karaiyethu with Shankar . In some of the Tamil movies, she appeared as the second lead and supporting roles. She acted as Poornima Bhagyaraj's friend in Darling, Darling, Darling and as Sudhakar's sister in Pennin Vazhkai. She acted with Karthik in the suspense movie Kelviyum Naane Pathilum Naane (1982) where actress Srividya acted as an antagonist. Aruna Mucherla also acted in some good family-oriented movies like Kathula Poo, Sakalakala Sambanthi, and Penmani Aval Kanmani.

In 1981, the Telugu film Seethakoka Chiluka received a Swarna (Gold) Nandi Award for Best Feature Film. She spread across acting more than 80 movies within 10 years majoring all 4 South Indian languages.

She is married to Mohan, a businessman based from Chandigarh in 1987 and the couple has four daughters. She lives in Chennai with her family.

== Filmography ==
In order of languages in which she acted the most to fewest films.

=== Telugu ===
1. Seetakoka Chiluka (1981)
2. Jegantalu (1981)
3. Justice Chowdary (1982)
4. Pratigna (1982) as Tulasi
5. Poola Pallki (1982)
6. Pralaya Rudrudu (1982) as Janaki
7. Kirayi Kotigadu (1983) as Lakshmi
8. Kalyana Veena (1983)
9. Mugguru Ammayila Mogudu (1983)
10. Adavi Simhalu (1983)
11. Aalaya Sikharam (1983) as Thayaru
12. Puttadi Bomma (1983)
13. Rama Rao Gopal Rao a.k.a. Rao Gopal Rao (1984) as Sarada
14. Seethamma Pelli (1984)
15. Raraju (1984)
16. Srivariki Premalekha (1984)
17. Padmavyuham (1984)
18. Bobbili Brahmanna (1984)
19. Swathi (1985)
20. Sravanthi (1985)
21. Patala Nagu (1985)
22. Surya Chandra (1985)
23. Assadhyudu (1985)
24. Aagraham (1985)
25. Mudilla Muchata (1985)
26. Aruna Kiranam (1986)
27. Karpoora Deepam (1986)
28. Chantabbai (1986)
29. Seetharama Kalyanam (1986)
30. Neti Yuga Dharmam (1986)
31. Deshoddharakudu (1986)
32. Bhargava Ramudu (1987)
33. Samsaram Oka Chadarangam (1987)
34. Veera Pratap (1987) as Malini
35. Bharatamlo Arjunudu (1987)
36. Dongallo Dora (1987)
37. Makutamleni Maharaju (1987)
38. Shrutilayalu (1987)
39. Muddayi (1987) as Kamala
40. Srimathi Oka Bahumathi (1987)
41. Bhanumati Gari Mogudu (1987)
42. Collector Vijaya (1988)
43. Yuddha Bhoomi (1988)
44. Aadade Aadharam (1988)
45. Illu Illalu Pillalu (1988)
46. Swarnakamalam (1988)
47. Aswaddhama (1988) as Jyothi
48. Geethanjali (1989)
49. Mouna Poratam (1989)
50. Athaku Yamudu Ammayiki Mogudu (1989)
51. Adavilo Ardharatri (1989)
52. Rao Gari Intlo Rowdy (1990)

=== Tamil ===
1. Kallukkul Eeram (1980) – Debut in Tamil
2. Magarandham (1981)
3. Sivappu Malli (1981)
4. Needhi Pizhaithathu (1981)
5. Pennin Vazhkai (1981)
6. Nadodi Raja (1982)
7. Anandha Ragam (1982)
8. Sattam Sirikkiradhu (1982)
9. Darling, Darling, Darling (1982)
10. Nandri, Meendum Varuga (1982)
11. Kelviyum Naane Pathilum Naane (1982)
12. Kanalukku Karaiyethu (1982)
13. Kaakkum Kaamakakshi (1983)
14. Kathula Poo (1984)
15. Idhayam Thedum Udhayam (1984)
16. Muthal Mariyathai (1985)
17. Karimedu Karuvayan (1986)
18. Meendum Mahaan (1987)
19. Penmani Aval Kanmani (1988)
20. Kai Naattu (1988)
21. Sakalakala Sammandhi (1989) as Durga
22. Idhayathai Thirudathe (1989)
23. Enga Annan Varattum (1989)
24. Aadi Velli (1990)

=== Malayalam ===
1. Oomakkuyil (1983)
2. Mansoru Maha Samudram (1983) as Renuka
3. Pinnilavu (1983) as Gopi's wife
4. Sreekrishna Parunth (1984) as Naanikutty
5. Nethavu (1984)
6. Poomadhathe Pennu (1984) as Jaanu
7. Veendum Chalikkunna Chakram (1984) as Meera
8. Theere Pratheekshikkathe (1984) as Aruna
9. Njan Piranna Nattil (1985) as Sudha
10. Snehicha Kuttathinu (1985) as Sulochana
11. Uyarum Njan Nadake (1985) as Lasitha
12. Mulamoottil Adima (1985) as Sainaba
13. Scene No. 7 (1985) as Nandini
14. Ashtabandham (1986) as Ambika Antharjanam

=== Kannada ===
1. Parajitha (1982)
2. Ondagi Balu (1986)
3. Sowbhagya Lakshmi (1987)
4. Rudra (1989)
