= Poomadhathe Pennu =

- Poster designed by P. N. Menon
- Directed by: Hariharan
- Written by: Hariharan
- Screenplay by: Hariharan
- Produced by: G. P. Vijayakumar
- Starring: Prem Nazir; Unnimary; K. P. Ummer; M. G. Soman
- Cinematography: U. Rajagopal
- Edited by: M. S. Mani
- Music by: G. Devarajan
- Production company: Vimal Movies
- Distributed by: Vimal Movies
- Release date: 22 July 1984
- Country: India
- Language: Malayalam

Poomadhathe Pennu is a 1984 Indian Malayalam-language film, directed by Hariharan and produced by G. P. Vijayakumar. The film stars Prem Nazir, Unnimary, K. P. Ummer and M. G. Soman. The film's score was composed by G. Devarajan.

== Plot ==
Poomadhathe Pennu is an emotional family film.

== Cast ==
- Prem Nazir as Vasudevan
- Unnimary as Nalini
- K. P. Ummer as Sreedharan
- M. G. Soman as Somashekharan
- Ramu as Rajagopal
- Mucherla Aruna as Janu
- Kuthiravattom Pappu as Jeeevikkan marannupoya Khalid
- Paravoor Bharathan as Ayyappan Adiyodi
- T. G. Ravi as Kochaniyan
- Nellikode Bhaskaran as Hajiar
- Sathaar as Raghavan
- Sathyakala as Susheela
- Y. Vijaya as Police Ponnamma
- C. I. Paul as Udumban Joseph
- Pattom Sadan as Nanu Nair
- Aranmula Ponnamma as Grandmother
- Rajkumar Sethupathi as Anand
- Anuradha as Dancer
- Santo Krishnan as Gunda

== Soundtrack ==
The music was composed by G. Devarajan with lyrics by Mankombu Gopalakrishnan.

No.	Song	Singers	Lyrics	Length (m:ss)
1	"Kannil Kaamante"	Vani Jairam	Mankombu Gopalakrishnan	
2	"Thumbappoo Choru Venam" (Pathos)	K. J. Yesudas, P. Madhuri	Mankombu Gopalakrishnan	
3	"Thumbappoochoru"	K. J. Yesudas, P. Madhuri	Mankombu Gopalakrishnan	
