= Mappusakshi =

Film

- Directed by: P. N. Menon
- Written by: M. T. Vasudevan Nair
- Screenplay by: M. T. Vasudevan Nair
- Produced by: United Producers
- Starring: Madhu; Jayabharathi; Balan K Nair; Kuthiravattam Pappu
- Cinematography: Ashok Kumar
- Edited by: Ravi
- Music by: M. S. Baburaj
- Production company: United Films
- Distributed by: United Films
- Release date: 27 December 1972
- Country: India
- Language: Malayalam

Mappusakshi is a 1972 Indian Malayalam film, directed by P. N. Menon and produced by United Producers. The film stars Madhu, Jayabharathi, Balan K Nair and Kuthiravattam Pappu in the lead roles. The film had musical score by M. S. Baburaj.

== Cast ==
- Madhu
- Jayabharathi
- Balan K. Nair
- Kuthiravattam Pappu
- Nellikode Bhaskaranf

== Soundtrack ==
The music was composed by M. S. Baburaj and the lyrics were written by Sreekumaran Thampi and Mankombu Gopalakrishnan.

No.	Song	Singers	Lyrics	Length (m:ss)
1	"Pakalukal Veenu"	P. Jayachandran	Sreekumaran Thampi	
2	"Udayam Kizhakku Thanne"	K. J. Yesudas	Mankombu Gopalakrishnan	
3	"Vrischika Karthika Poo"	S. Janaki	Sreekumaran Thampi	
