= Pudukavithai =

- Poster
- Directed by: S. P. Muthuraman
- Screenplay by: Visu
- Based on: Naa Ninna Mareyalare by M. R. Anand (Note: The story is credited to M. R. Anand although the writer of the original story, Naanu Neenu Jodi, is A. R. Anand.)
- Produced by: Rajam Balachander
- Starring: Rajinikanth; Jyothi; Sukumari
- Cinematography: Babu
- Edited by: R. Vittal
- Music by: Ilaiyaraaja
- Production company: Kavithalayaa Productions
- Release date: 11 June 1982
- Running time: 139 Minutes
- Country: India
- Language: Tamil

Pudukavithai (transl. New Poem) is a 1982 Indian Tamil-language romantic drama film directed by S. P. Muthuraman, starring Rajinikanth, Jyothi and Sukumari with Saritha in a guest appearance. It is a remake of the 1976 Kannada film Naa Ninna Mareyalare. The film was released on 11 June 1982.

== Plot ==
Anand has been a motorcycle contest champion for six years in a row. Winning the championship introduces him to Uma, the daughter of a haughty, rich, and arrogant Thilakavathy, who owns a vast tea estate called Tiger Estate in Ooty. Initially, Uma hates and mocks Anand for his dark complexion, which their car driver, Saminathan, overhears. Enraged, Saminathan drops Uma and her friends midway, as Saminathan is Anand’s paternal uncle. When Thilakavathy learns about this, she brutally whips him using her henchmen. Seeing his uncle beaten, Anand confronts Thilakavathy at her bungalow, thrashes her henchmen with the same whip, and warns Thilakavathy. To avenge Uma for mocking him as “black-skinned,” he forcibly kisses her and leaves.

Humiliated, Thilakavathy sends goons to torch Anand’s hut. Anand gets knocked down and locked inside as they set the hut ablaze. Coincidentally, Uma rescues Anand from the fire and confesses her love, and soon Anand too reciprocates. Thilakavathy is shocked that he escaped from the fire, unaware that it was Uma who rescued him. Anand works in a company in Coimbatore and has a chance to meet Uma only on weekends. He fakes leave on a Wednesday and goes to Ooty to meet her, but Uma drives downhill to Coimbatore to meet him. Realizing that they have crossed paths, both drive back and finally meet. Thilakavathy notices their union and beats Uma for loving him. Anand confronts Thilakavathy, asking her to accept their love, but she verbally abuses him. Uma decides to leave with Anand, abandoning her mother. Instantly, to stop Uma, Thilakavathy pretends to accept their union. Meanwhile, she fixes Uma’s marriage with another groom, Prem, in Dharmapuri on the 20th. At the same time, she lies to Uma, telling her that her marriage to Anand is fixed on the 25th.

To execute her plan, Thilakavathy cleverly sends Anand to Madras under the pretense of arranging a passport for his honeymoon trip and restrains him there until Uma’s marriage is completed. Thilakavathy humiliates Saminathan as well when he comes to collect an invitation. Uma is shocked to discover her mother’s ruse of arranging her marriage with another groom and consumes poison, but Thilakavathy had replaced the bottle with sedatives, causing Uma only to faint. Using this, Thilakavathy transports Uma to Dharmapuri to carry out the marriage as planned. To ensure Uma does not resist, Thilakavathy, through her manager, threatens that if Uma refuses to marry Prem, Anand will be killed. Anand learns of Thilakavathy’s plan and soon, one of the goons reforms, helps Anand escape, and lends his bike to Anand to drive to Dharmapuri to stop the marriage. Braving many obstacles created by Thilakavathy, Anand rushes, but Uma’s wedding with Prem is completed by the time he arrives. Depressed, Anand resorts to alcoholism.

Years later, Anand is seemingly happily married to Kalyani and has a daughter, Uma, who studies in the second standard. Coincidentally, Anand meets Uma in his daughter’s school, where she happens to be the teacher. Anand learns that she, too, is happily married, has two children, and that she gave away all her properties to the workers after her mother died. Kalyani suspects Anand of infidelity with Uma and confronts her at school, insisting that Uma come to their house on Deepavali. When Uma visits, Kalyani introduces Uma to her husband Ganesh, shocking Uma, who had believed all along that Anand was married to Kalyani. In the past, Kalyani and Ganesh had saved Anand when he lay drunk on a road, after which Anand stayed with them. Kalyani has since discovered Anand’s past and intends to reunite him with his former lover, Uma.

Uma pleads with Anand to marry soon, but he vehemently refuses. In her rush to leave, she forgets her handbag, and Anand goes to her house to return it. There, Anand sees a garlanded photo of Prem, Uma’s husband, and with no other option, Uma then reveals the truth—that her husband, a Flight Lieutenant, died in a crash just one week after their marriage. She confesses that she lied, just as Anand did, so that neither of them would feel guilty about being separated. Knowing that the life of a widow is not easy, Anand asks for Uma’s hand in marriage. The next day, he travels to her house only to find it locked. He then receives a letter from her, in which she writes that she does not wish to stain his life, as she believes being a widow is her destiny. She decides to leave for Mysore.

Determined to marry her, Anand rushes to the railway station but fails to meet her in time. As the train departs, he speeds on his motorcycle and, despite many hindrances on the way, chases the train and reaches a mid-station along its route. Seeing Anand’s determination and pursuit, Uma has a change of heart. She deboards the train, and the two finally reunite, embracing each other.

== Cast ==
- Rajinikanth as Anand
- Jyothi as Uma
- Sukumari as Thilakavathy
- Srilekha Rajendran as Uma's friend
- Baby Deepa as Uma, Kalyani's daughter
- Thengai Srinivasan as Saminathan, Anand's uncle
- Poornam Viswanathan as Uma's father-in-law
- Delhi Ganesh as Ganesh
- I. S. R. as Thilakavathy's servant
- Saritha in a special appearance as Kalyani

== Production ==
Pudukavithai was a remake of Kannada film Naa Ninna Mareyalare. While scouting locations to shoot the song "Vellai Pura Ondru" in scenic places like Coutralam and Munnar, Muthuraman witnessed a blanket of fog on the water at 4:30 in the morning, and that is where he immediately shot the song. A scene where Rajinikanth chases the train was shot at a route between Kanchipuram and Arakonam.

== Soundtrack ==
Music was composed by Ilaiyaraaja. The song "Vellai Pura Onru" is set in Kalyani raga.

All tracks are written by Vairamuthu.

Track listing
No.	Title	Singer(s)	Length
1.	"Vellai Pura Onru" (duet)	K. J. Yesudas, S. Janaki	4:21
2.	"Vaarey Vaa"	K. J. Yesudas, S. Janaki	4:28
3.	"Vellai Pura Ondru" (solo)	K. J. Yesudas	4:24
4.	"Vaa Vaa Vasanthamey"	Malaysia Vasudevan	3:55
Total length:			17:13

== Release and reception ==
Pudukavithai was released on 11 June 1982. Playing on the film's title, Thiraignani of Kalki called it "Burr Burr Kavithai" (whoosh whoosh story).
