= Vanitha Krishnachandran =

Indian film and television actress

- Born: Sai Vanitha; Tiruchirappalli, Tamil Nadu, India
- Occupation: Film actor
- Years active: 1979–1987; 2002–present
- Spouse(s): Krishnachandran (m.1986–present)
- Parent(s): Ganeshan, Kamala, Kiran (Star Nephew)

Vanitha Krishnachandran is an Indian film and television actress. She acted during the 1980s in nearly 170 films in Tamil and Malayalam films. She is currently more active with several Tamil and Malayalam television serials.

== Personal life ==
Vanitha was born to Ganeshan and Kamala as the youngest of four children at Tiruchirappalli, Tamil Nadu. Her father is from Manjeri, Kerala, whose paternal ancestors originally hail from Tamil Nadu and her mother is from Tiruchirappalli. She was originally named Sai Vanitha, since her parents were huge devotees of the Indian guru Sathya Sai Baba. She has two elder sisters, Sai Prashanthi and Sai Jayalakshmi and an elder brother, Sai Ram. She had her primary education at RSK Higher Secondary School, Tiruchirappalli. She stopped studies after tenth grade since she became busy with movies by then.

She married Malayalam actor and singer Krishnachandran on 11 May 1986 with whom she starred in Eenadu, Vanithapolice, Belt Mathai, Deeparadhana and a few other films.

== Career ==
Vanitha entered the film industry as a 13-year-old and her debut film was Padai Maarinal directed by national award-winning director Durai, in 1979 in which she played a school girl. She played the lead role in her first Malayalam film, Chandrabimbam and became popular among Malayalis with her roles in Eenadu, Kaikeyi, and Enickum Oru Divasum. She acted opposite Mammooty and Mohanlal, in 'Vikatakavi and Chakravalam Chuvannappol, respectively. She said "I worked round-the-clock in Tamil, Telugu, Malayalam and Kannada films" and "cut down my assignments following my marriage". The last film she did before marriage was Kalyana Agathigal which was her 100th film.

In 2001, In Tamil, she made a comeback with a negative role in K. Balachander's television serial Kaalmulaitha Aasai. She has continued to act in serials in Tamil, such as Alaigal, and Kolangal, and Malayalam. She portrayed Jalaja teacher in K. K. Rajeev's serial Amma Manasu and has said that it was the real break in her second innings. She also played the role of a mother in Tamil films like Kana Kandaen, Kalabha Kadhalan and Parijatham and in many Malayalam films.

== Partial filmography ==
=== Tamil ===
Year	Title	Role	Notes
1979	Padhai Maarinal		
1979	Adukku Malli		
1980	Sujatha		
1980	Kaadu		
1980	Malargale Malarungal		
1980	Nandri Karangal		
1980	Malargindra Paruvathile		
1980	Neer Nilam Neruppu		
1980	Panam Penn Paasam		
1980	Porkkaalam		
1980	Oli Pirandhathu	Poongavanam	
1981	Andhi Mayakkam		
1981	Anjatha Nenjangal		
1981	Vasantha Kaalam	Kala	
1981	Madhu Malar		
1981	Keezh Vaanam Sivakkum		
1981	Nandu	Uma	
1981	Kazhugu	Vasanthi	
1981	Simla Special	Sri Sri	
1981	Nandu	Uma	
1982	Parvaiyin Marupakkam		
1982	Ayiram Muthangal		
1982	Kanne Radha	Geetha	
1982	Vedikkai Manidhargal		
1982	Amma		
1982	Thunai		
1982	Vadivangal		
1982	Vetri Namedhe	Rani	
1982	Auto Raja	Shanthi	
1982	Echchil Iravugal		
1982	Adhisayappiravigal		
1982	Theerpugal Thiruththapadalam	Kamini	
1982	Asthivaram		
1982	Antha Rathirikku Satchi Illai		
1982	Rani Theni	Kanagam	
1982	Nandri Meendum Varuga	Herself	
1982	Punitha Malar	Vanitha	
1982	Nenjil Oru Ragam		
1983	Anal Kaatru		
1983	Yugu Dharmam		
1983	Bramacharigal		
1983	Muthu Engal Sothu		
1983	Thalaimagan		
1983	Thudikkum Karangal	Stella	
1983	Anney Anney		
1983	Soora Puli		
1983	Seerum Singangal		
1983	Unmaigal	Kalpana	
1983	Poikkal Kudhirai		Guest role
1984	Oorukku upadesam		
1984	Pei Veedu		
1984	Nyayam		
1984	Sukra Desai		
1984	Pillaiyar		
1984	Vaai Sollil Veeranadi		
1984	Neengal Kettavai		
1984	Ambigai Neril Vanthaal		
1984	Aalaya Deepam		
1984	Unga Veetu Pillai	Sujatha	
1984	Priyamudan Prabhu		
1984	Vai Pandal		
1985	Pudhu Yugam		
1985	Raman Sreeraman	Saradha	
1985	Sivappu Nila		
1985	Veli		
1985	Vetrikani		
1985	Mookanankayiru		
1985	Porutham		
1985	Chain Jayapal		
1985	Ammavum Neeye Appavum Neeye		
1985	Raja Rishi	Ammani	
1985	Police Police		
1985	Kalyana Agathigal	Yeshodha	
1985	En Selvame		
1986	Kulirkaala Megangal		
1986	Oru Manithan Oru Manaivi		
1986	Naan Adimai Illai		
1987	Anjatha Singam		
2003	Student Number 1	Sibi's mother	
2003	Anbe Anbe	Vishali's mother	
2004	Arul	Arul's sister in law	
2004	Singara Chennai		
2004	Loves	Hari's mother	
2004	Gomathi Nayagam	Thangam	
2005	Kana Kandaen	Archana's mother	
2005	Kundakka Mandakka	Roopa's mother	
2006	Kalabha Kadhalan	Anbarasi's mother	
2006	Parijatham	Subhathra's mother	
2008	Yaaradi Nee Mohini	Godavari	
2008	Sandai	Kathiresan's aunt	
2010	Chikku Bukku	Meena's mother	
2010	Kalloori Kalangal	Santhosh's mother	
2010	Mudhal Kadhal Mazhai	Aanjaneyar Kumar's mother	
2011	Ko	Ashwin's mother	
2011	Bhavani	Deepa's mother	
2012	Manam Kothi Paravai	Thirumathi Ramaiah	
2013	Kanna Laddu Thinna Aasaiya	Shiva's mother	
2013	Desingu Raja	Thamarai's mother	
2014	Idhu Kathirvelan Kadhal	Pavithra' mother	
2014	Brahman	Siva's mother	
2014	Vellaikaara Durai	Murugan's mother	
2015	Kirumi	Anitha's mother	
2015	Ore Oru Raja Mokkaraja	Ananthavalli	
2016	Nambiar	Ramachandran's mother	
2016	Meendum Oru Kadhal Kadhai	Vinod's mother	
2016	Mapla Singam	Sailaja's mother	

=== Malayalam ===
Year	Title	Role	Notes
1980	Chandrahasam	Sreedevi	
1980	Chandra Bimbam	Mini	
1980	Shalini Ente Koottukari	Shalini's sister	
1981	Guha	Kamala	
1982	Aadharsam	Simmy	
1982	Enikkum Oru Divasam	Swapna	
1982	Innalenkil Nale	Rekha	
1982	Ee Nadu	Radha	
1982	Velicham Vitharunna Penkutty	Vanitha	
1983	Belt Mathai	Amina	
1983	Oru Madapravinte Katha	Malathi	
1983	Mouna Ragam		
1983	Professor Janaki		
1983	Deepaaradhana	Janu	
1983	Kaikeyi		
1983	Aadhipathyam	Kanam	
1983	Chakravalam Chuvannappol	Prabha	
1984	Vikatakavi	Nabeesa	
1984	Vanitha Police	Ratnamma	
1984	Oru Sumangaliyude Kadha	Kalyani	
1985	Nayakan	Heroine	
1985	Nulli Novikkathe		
1989	Aazhikkoru Muthu	Jaya	
1995	Sargavasantham		
2002	Basket	Siva	
2006	Nottam	Vishnu's mother	
2007	Chocolate	Vanaja	
2007	Rock & Roll	Chandramouli's mother	
2008	Minnaminnikoottam	Rosemary's mother	
2008	Innathe Chintha Vishayam	Kamala's mother	
2008	Mulla	Lachi's mother	
2009	Sagar Alias Jacky Reloaded	Azar's mother	
2009	Bhagyadevatha	Rosy	
2011	Bhakthajanangalude Sradhakku	Viswanathan's mother	
2011	Themmadi Pravu		
2012	Orkut Oru Ormakoot		
2012	Thalsamayam Oru Penkutty	Suryan's mother	
2012	Thattathin Marayathu	Vinod's mother	
2012	Perinoru Makan	Thulasi	
2012	101 Weddings	Malathi	
2012	Vaadhyar	Anoop's mother	
2012	Chapters	Krishna Kumar's mother	
2012	I Love Me	Xavi's mother	
2013	3 Dots	Padmakumar's wife	
2013	72 Model	Saajan's mother	
2013	Ravu	Sanjay's mother	
2013	Vishudhan	Sunny's mother	
2013	Artist	Gayatri's mother	
2013	Neelakasham Pachakadal Chuvanna Bhoomi	Azma	
2013	Memories	Marykutty	
2014	How Old Are You	Nirupama's mother	
2014	Pianist	Manu's mother	
2015	Mili	Sudha	
2015	Oru Second Class Yathra	Indira	
2015	Monsoon	Anaas's mother	
2015	Urumbukal urangarilla	Ratha	
2016	Kali	Anjali's mother	
2016	Pa Va	Elamma	
2016	Inspector Dawood Ibrahim	Dawood Ibrahim's mother	
2017	Kadamkatha	Sudha	
2018	Kammara Sambhavam	Gomathi	
2018	Thobama	Shanthi	
2019	Brother's Day	Mother Superior	
2021	Neeravam	Rajeswari	
2022	Vaashi	Ebin's mother	
2022	Aanandam Paramanandam	Vimala teacher	
2025	Ambalamukkile Visheshangal	Girijakumari	

=== Kannada ===
- Dharma (1985)

== Television ==
=== Television series ===
Year	Title	Role	Channel	Language
2001–2003	Kaalmulaitha Aasai	Valli	Sun TV	Tamil
2001–2003	Alaigal	Seetha	Sun TV	Tamil
2003–2006	Kolangal	Saradha	Sun TV	Tamil
2004–2005	Engirundho Vandhaal	Vijaya	Jaya TV	Tamil
2005–2006	Alli Raajiyam	Malarvizhi	Sun TV	Tamil
2006–2007	Amma Manassu	Jalaja Teacher	Asianet	Malayalam
2007	Kanavugal Aayiram		Jaya TV	Tamil
2007	Mounam Nombaram	Rachel	Kairali TV	Malayalam
2008	January		Asianet	Malayalam
2009	Coimbatore Ammayi		Amrita TV	Malayalam
2009–2011	Madhavi		Sun TV	Tamil
2009	Kudumbayogam	Dathamma	Surya TV	Malayalam
2009	Aagneyam		DD Malayalam	Malayalam
2011–2012	Deivathinte Swantham Devootty	Kalyani	Mazhavil Manorama	Malayalam
2011–2013	Akashadoothu	Mary	Surya TV	Malayalam
2011–2012	Paattukalude Paattu	Sulochana	Surya TV	Malayalam
2012	Kumkumapoovu	Professor Rajalakshmi	Asianet	Malayalam
2012	Chandralekha		Asianet	Malayalam
2017–2019	Mullum Malarum	Kanthiyamma	Zee Tamil	Tamil
2017	Nilavum Nakshathrangalum		Amrita TV	Malayalam
2018–2019	Kalyana Parisu 2	Subbulakshmi	Sun TV	Tamil
2021–2023	Aanpirannol	Daisy Teacher	Amrita TV	Malayalam
2024–present	Meera	Subhadra	Amrita TV	Malayalam
2024	Siragadikka Aasai (TV series)	Subbulakshmi	Star Vijay	Tamil

=== Other television shows ===
- JB Junction
- Tharapakittu
- Red Carpet
- Manassiloru Mazhavillu

== Web series ==
Year	Title	Role	Channel	Language	Notes
2019	Queen	Janani Devi	MX Player	Tamil	
2024-2025	Uppu Puli Kaaram	Subba lakshmi	Hotstar	Tamil	
2025	Yuva Sapnon Ka Safar		Waves OTT	Multilingual (mainly English)	Anthology series Segment: Backstage
