= Nizhal Thedum Nenjangal =

- Poster
- Directed by: P. S. Nivas
- Written by: Thirupur Manimaran
- Produced by: Jayagowri
- Starring: Rajeev; Vijayashanti; Vadivukkarasi
- Cinematography: P. S. Nivas
- Edited by: R. Bhaskaran
- Music by: Ilaiyaraaja
- Production company: Siva Chithra Pictures
- Release date: 14 November 1982
- Country: India
- Language: Tamil

Nizhal Thedum Nenjangal (pronounced [n̪iɻal teːɖum n̪eɲdʑaŋɡaɭ] transl. Shadow-Seeking Hearts) is a 1982 Indian Tamil-language film directed and photographed by P. S. Nivas. The film stars Rajeev, Vijayashanti and Vadivukkarasi. It was released on 14 November 1982.

== Cast ==
- Rajeev
- Vijayashanti
- Bhanu Chander
- Vadivukkarasi
- Vennira Aadai Moorthy
- Goundamani
- Oru Viral Krishna Rao
- Master Suresh
- Srikanth (uncredited)

== Production ==
Nizhal Thedum Nenjangal is Nivas' third directorial venture. Bhanu Chander's voice was dubbed by R. Parthiban.

== Soundtrack ==
The music was composed by Ilaiyaraaja.

Song	Singers	Lyrics
"Idhu Kanavugal"	Deepan Chakravarthy, S. Janaki	Vairamuthu
"Iva Machchamulla"	Malaysia Vasudevan	Vairamuthu
"Mangala Vaanam"	Malaysia Vasudevan, Sasi Rekha	Vairamuthu
"Pookal Sindhungal"	S. P. Balasubrahmanyam, S. Janaki	Vairamuthu
"Thendral Thererum"	Uma Ramanan	Kalimuthu

== Release and reception ==
Nizhal Thedum Nenjangal was released on 14 November 1982. Thiraignani of Kalki said Nivas' cinematography was better than his directing skills.
