= K. R. Gangadharan =

Indian producer (1936–2012)

- Born: Keshavan Rajagopalan (KRG); 1936
- Died: 19 June 2012 (aged 76); Chennai, India
- Occupation: Film producer
- Children: 2

K. R. Gangadharan (1936–2012) popularly referred to as KRG, was an Indian film producer. He produced over 60 films in Tamil and Malayalam under the banner 'KRG Productions', 'KRG Art Productions', 'KRG Enterprises' and 'KRG Movies International'.

== Film career ==
Gangadharan founded the Tamil Film Producer's Council and had a stint as president of the South Indian Film Chamber of Commerce. He was elected as the president of the South India Film Chamber, unanimously by the producers of Tamil, Telugu, Malayalam and Kannada film's, distributors, studio owners, theatre owners are members of the association.

== Partial filmography ==
Year	Film	Language	Notes
1975	Aayirathil Oruthi	Tamil	
1980	Johnny	Tamil	
1981	Kadal Meengal	Tamil	
1982	Antha Rathirikku Satchi Illai	Tamil	
1983	Thudikkum Karangal	Tamil	
1984	Thiruppam	Tamil	
1984	Alaya Deepam	Tamil	
1985	Nermai	Tamil	
1985	Unnai Thedi Varuven	Tamil	
1986	Thaaiku Oru Thaalaattu	Tamil	
1987	Kavalan Avan Kovalan	Tamil	
1988	Sangham	Malayalam	
1989	Adhipan	Malayalam	
1989	Mrugaya	Malayalam	
1989	Sakalakala Sammandhi	Tamil	
1989	Vadakkunokkiyantram	Malayalam	
1989	Varavelpu	Malayalam	
1989	Varnam	Malayalam	
1990	Lal Salam	Malayalam	
1990	Oliyambukal	Malayalam	
1990	Pengal Veettin Kangal	Tamil	
1990	Manaivi Vandha Neram	Tamil	
1991	Neelagiri	Malayalam	
1992	Sivandha Malar	Tamil	
1993	Parvathi Ennai Paradi	Tamil	
1999	Minsara Kanna	Tamil	
2000	Sudhandhiram	Tamil	
2000	Budget Padmanabhan	Tamil	
2001	Middle Class Madhavan	Tamil	
2001	Manadhai Thirudivittai	Tamil	
2009	Guru En Aalu	Tamil	

== Death ==
Gangadharan died on 19 June 2012, aged 76. He was admitted to a private hospital at T. Nagar in Chennai, and had been responding well to treatment. He was about to be discharged on the day he died, but as he was about to step out, he collapsed and was declared dead soon after, the sources said. He is survived by his wife and daughter.

== Awards ==
- Kalaimamani Award - 1998
