= Ananda Ragam =

- Poster
- Directed by: Bharani
- Screenplay by: Panchu Arunachalam
- Based on: Alaigal Oivathillai by Thamarai Senthoorapandi
- Produced by: Panchu Arunachalam
- Starring: Sivakumar; Radha; Aruna
- Cinematography: Velu Prabhakaran
- Edited by: B. Kandasamy
- Music by: Ilaiyaraaja
- Production company: Panju Arts
- Release date: 14 January 1982
- Country: India
- Language: Tamil

Anandha Ragam (transl. Tune of joy) is a 1982 Indian Tamil-language romance film directed by Bharani, starring Sivakumar, Radha and Aruna. The film is based on the novel Alaigal Oivathillai (transl. Waves never cease) by Thamarai Senthoorapandi. It was released on 14 January 1982.

== Cast ==
- Sivakumar
- Radha
- Aruna
- Sivachandran
- Ravikumar
- Goundamani
- Veera Raghavan
- V. R. Thilakam
- Indira Devi

== Soundtrack ==
The music was composed by Ilaiyaraaja.

Track listing
No.	Title	Lyrics	Singer(s)	Length
1.	"Kadaloram"	Panchu Arunachalam	K. J. Yesudas, Ilaiyaraaja	4:21
2.	"Kanavugaley"	Gangai Amaran	K. J. Yesudas	4:48
3.	"Megam Karukkuthu"	Panchu Arunachalam	K. J. Yesudas, S. Janaki	4:26
4.	"Oru Raagam"	Gangai Amaran	K. J. Yesudas, S. Janaki	4:27
Total length:				18:02

== Critical reception ==
Sindhu Jeeva of Kalki gave a mixed review, saying the film failed to do justice to the novel and it lacked naturality, but praised Ilaiyaraaja's music.
