= Shankari =

Shankari is a given name and surname. Notable people with the name include:

- Uma Shankari (fl. 2000), Indian actress
- Shankari Chandran (born 1974/75), British-Australian novelist
