= Nadodi Raja =

- Directed by: S. M. Ummar
- Produced by: Mrs. Thirumathi Geetha; K. R. Srinivasan
- Starring: Rajeev; Mucherla Aruna
- Cinematography: V. Manokar
- Edited by: C. V. Krishnan
- Music by: Shankar–Ganesh
- Release date: 15 October 1982
- Country: India
- Language: Tamil

Nadodi Raja (transl. Vagabond king) is a 1982 Indian Tamil-language action film directed by S. M. Ummar, starring Rajeev and Mucherla Aruna. The film was released on 15 October 1982.

== Cast ==
- Rajeev as Raja
- Mucherla Aruna
- Amrad Kumar
- Sangili Murugan
- Sathyaraj as Shekhar
- Thiagarajan as Muruga
- Y. G. Mahendran
- Jayamalini
- Vennira Aadai Nirmala
- Y. Vijaya
- Silk Smitha

== Soundtrack ==
The music was composed by Shankar–Ganesh.

Song	Singer(s)	Lyrics	Length
"Sandhana Punnagai Sindhiya"	S. P. Balasubrahmanyam, S. Janaki	Vairamuthu	04:05
"Ek Ladki Rupsundari"	Vani Jairam	Vaali	04:03
"Porakkum Pothu Idhe Vayasu"	Vani Jairam	Vaali	04:36
"Enga Veetu Pillai"	S. P. Balasubrahmanyam	Vaali	04:10
