= Kelviyum Naane Bathilum Naane =

- Title card
- Directed by: N. Murugesh
- Written by: Thooyavan
- Produced by: R. Radha; M. S. Akbar
- Starring: Karthik; Mucherla Aruna
- Cinematography: Govindhan–Kumar
- Edited by: N. Murugesh
- Music by: Ilaiyaraaja
- Production company: S. T. Combines
- Release date: 7 May 1982
- Running time: 125 minutes
- Country: India
- Language: Tamil

Kelviyum Naane Bathilum Naane (transl. I am both the question and answer) is a 1982 Indian Tamil-language thriller film directed by N. Murugesh in his debut, starring Karthik and Mucherla Aruna. It was released on 7 May 1982.

== Plot ==
Nirmal teaches piano to Usha. Nirmal meets Radha many times and they fall in love. When his student Usha tells him about her love, Nirmal says that he is in love with Radha and they will get married soon. Melancholic, she commits suicide.

Later, many people cross Nirmal's path thinking it's Babu. At the marriage ceremony, Satyavati tries to stop thinking it's her son Babu and they all explain it's Nirmal. A few days after the marriage, Nirmal gets into an accident, his car burns, and the police officers conclude that he's dead.

In actuality, Satyavati, Usha's mother, created the character of Babu and she escrows Nirmal. When Nirmal says the truth to Radha, she thinks that it's Babu. Radha's father tells Satyavati that Radha is her daughter. Satyavati forgives Nirmal, but he decides to take revenge on her and Usha. He goes to jail for Nirmal's murder as Babu. Satyavati appoints Rajagopal, a lawyer, to save him. Finally, Nirmal is liberated and Satyavati dies to rejoin her late daughter Usha.

== Cast ==
- Karthik as Nirmal / Babu
- Mucherla Aruna as Radha
- Poornima Devi as Usha
- Srividya as Satyavati
- Jaishankar as Rajagopal (guest appearance)
- Vadivukkarasi as Pankajam (guest appearance)

== Production ==
Kelviyum Naane Bathilum Naane marked the directorial debut of N. Murugesh who earlier assisted K. Bhagyaraj.

== Soundtrack ==
The music was composed by Ilaiyaraaja, with lyrics written by Vaali.

Song	Singer(s)	Duration
"Aadai Kondu Aadum"	S. P. Sailaja, Unni Menon	4:35
"Endrum Vaanaveliyil"	Unni Menon	4:36
"Ninaithu Ninaithu Varaintha Ovium"	P. Susheela	4:32
"Sollikkodu Sollikkodu"	Gangai Amaran, Sasirekha	4:42

== Reception ==
Kalki praised the acting of the actors, Murugesh's direction and concluded the film is watchable.
