= Kallukkul Eeram =

1980 film by P. S. Nivas

- Poster
- Directed by: P. S. Nivas
- Screenplay by: Bharathiraja
- Story by: Chandrabose
- Produced by: Neelima
- Starring: Bharathiraja; Sudhakar; Mucherla Aruna; Vijaya Shanthi
- Cinematography: P. S. Nivas
- Edited by: Chandy
- Music by: Ilaiyaraaja
- Production company: Neelima Movie Makers
- Release date: 29 February 1980
- Running time: 120 minutes
- Country: India
- Language: Tamil

Kallukkul Eeram (transl. Moisture in the stone) is a 1980 Indian Tamil-language drama film directed by P. S. Nivas in his directorial debut, starring Bharathiraja, Sudhakar, Mucherla Aruna and Vijaya Shanthi. The film marked the Tamil debut for both Aruna and Vijaya Shanthi. It was released on 29 February 1980.

== Plot ==
This is a story of two innocent village girls who fall in love with the director and the lead actor of a cinema crew visiting their village for a shoot. Aruna falls in love with Bharathiraja and Vijaya Shanthi with Sudhakar.

Bharathiraja's movie crew lands on the picturesque and primeval village. The villagers are enthralled by the visiting crew. Vijaya Shanthi, a witty girl and Aruna, who perpetually wears an expression of shock and surprise combined, her marble-eyes not letting any other emotions through, are constant onlookers. Aruna steps into the frame of the movie and is admonished by Bharathiraja. Vijayshanthi and Aruna stage a role play song with the village children, with V. Shanthi as the heroine and Aruna as the director. Bharathiraja and Sudhakar walk by and catch them in the act. They appreciate the villagers' amateur attempt and praise them. Aruna returns some money she finds, which belongs to Bharathiraja and he further appreciates her honesty.

Goundamani, who is Aruna's dad, runs the village laundry. Aruna delivers the laundered clothes to the crew. As she visits Bharathiraja each time, she also secretly sends him a flower or a note.

Vijayashanthi develops romantic feelings towards Sudhakar, only to be told by him that he meets several girls like her and she mistook his friendly gestures. In a moment when a supporting artiste did not show up, Bharathiraja grabs Aruna from the crowd and makes her play a one-line part.

Karuppan, who wounded the arm of another villager who once teased Aruna, returns from jail. He finds out about Bharathiraja grabbing Aruna's arm and tries to kill him by rolling rocks on him. However, Aruna finds out and saves Bharathiraja. He notices later that the cloth tied around his injured arm belongs to Aruna's saree. During the village temple festival, Vijayashanthi dances in the play. However, as she was jilted by Sudhakar, she commits suicide. Karuppan tries to molest Aruna in the groves, but Chandrashekar, the village madman kills him.

The crew leaves the village. As they leave, Aruna stops Bharathiraja, but doesn't tell him anything. Hounded by memories of her, he returns and they unite on the river banks. As he holds her hand, Chandrashekar kills him from behind.

== Cast ==
- Bharathiraja as himself
- Sudhakar as himself
- Vennira Aadai Nirmala as Nirmala
- Aruna as Solai
- Vijayashanti as Kaathi
- Goundamani as Velu
- Janagaraj
- Master Suresh

Assistant directors Manobala and Manivannan, uncredited, also act in the film in cameo roles.

== Soundtrack ==
The music was composed by Ilaiyaraaja.

Song	Singers	Lyrics	Length
"Endhan Kairasi Parum"	S. Janaki	Gangai Amaran	4:19
"Ennatthil Yedho"	S. Janaki	Gangai Amaran	4:08
"Kothamalli Poove"	Malaysia Vasudevan, S. Janaki	Gangai Amaran	4:10
"Siru Ponmani"	Ilaiyaraaja, Malaysia Vasudevan, S. Janaki	Gangai Amaran	3:59
"Thoppiloru Natakam"	Ilaiyaraaja, Malaysia Vasudevan, S. P. Sailaja	Muthuvendhan	4:29

== Critical reception ==
Kanthan of Kalki praised the performances of the cast and the cinematography, and called the film a must watch.

== In other media ==
The song "Siru Ponmani" is reused in Subramaniapuram (2008) in a single scene, playing on a radio set when Azhagar (Jai) and Thulasi (Swathi Reddy) exchange romantic glances.
