= Antha Rathirikku Satchi Illai =

- Title card
- Directed by: R. Sundarrajan
- Written by: R. Sundarrajan
- Produced by: K. R. Gangadharan
- Starring: Kapil Dev; Sulakshana; Sivachandran; Vanitha
- Cinematography: N. K. Viswanathan
- Edited by: K. R. Ramalingam
- Music by: K. V. Mahadevan
- Production company: K. R. G. Art Productions
- Release date: 15 October 1982
- Country: India
- Language: Tamil

Antha Rathirikku Satchi Illai (transl. There is no witness to that night) is a 1982 Indian Tamil-language film written and directed by R. Sundarrajan, and produced by K. R. Gangadharan. The film stars newcomer Kapil Dev, Sulakshana and Sivachandran. It was released on 15 October 1982.

== Cast ==
- Kapil Dev
- Sulakshana
- Sivachandran
- Vanitha
- Usha
- Goundamani
- Kallapetti Singaram
- Idichapuli Selvaraj
- Samikannu
- S. S. Chandran
- Balu Anand
- Senthil
- Pasi Sathya
- S. N. Parvathy
- Sumithra
- Satyachitra
- Vani
- Kakinada Shymala

== Production ==
The film's lead actor Irfan Ghatala was rechristened Kapil Dev after Sundarrajan found his height similar to the cricketer of the same name. The filming was held at Palapatti near Mettupalayam.

== Soundtrack ==
The soundtrack was composed by K. V. Mahadevan.

Track listing
No.	Title	Lyrics	Singer(s)	Length
1.	"Mani Osaiyum"	Pulamaipithan	S. P. Balasubrahmanyam, S. Janaki	4:09
2.	"Sumaithangiye"	Muthulingam	S. P. Balasubrahmanyam, P. Susheela	4:25
3.	"Ethirparthen"	Vaali	S. P. Balasubrahmanyam	5:15
4.	"Yaana Varadha"	V. Sundarraj	Malaysia Vasudevan	2:49
Total length:				16:38

== Release and reception ==
Antha Rathirikku Satchi Illai was released on 15 October 1982. Kalki felt the story and climax lacked spice but praised Viswanathan's cinematography and Mahadevan's music. Balumani of Anna praised the acting of cast except for the lead actor Kapil Dev's acting. He criticised Sundarrajan's direction for having lack of continuity in certain scenes while also panning the film for having silly scenes and concluded calling the film just okay.
