= Echchil Iravugal =

- Title card
- Directed by: A. S. Prakasam
- Written by: A. S. Prakasam
- Produced by: A. S. Prakasam
- Starring: Roopa; Pratap Pothen; Raveendar; Vanitha Krishnachandran; Chandrasekhar
- Cinematography: Balu Mahendra
- Edited by: D. Vasu
- Music by: Ilaiyaraaja
- Production company: New Wavers
- Release date: 14 April 1982
- Running time: 125 minutes
- Country: India
- Language: Tamil

Echchil Iravugal is a 1982 Indian Tamil-language film, directed by A. S. Prakasam, starring Roopa, Pratap Pothen, Raveendar and Vanitha Krishnachandran. It was released on 14 April 1982.

== Cast ==
- Roopa
- Pratap Pothen
- Raveendar
- Vanitha Krishnachandran
- Chandrasekhar

== Soundtrack ==
The music was composed by Ilaiyaraaja.

Song	Singers	Lyrics
"Ezhla Velakku"	S. P. Balasubrahmanyam	Vairamuthu
"Poothu Nikkudhu"	Jency Anthony, Malaysia Vasudevan	Kannadasan
"Kadar Karayil"	K. J. Yesudas & Chorus	Kannadasan
"Poo Melae Veesum"	K. J. Yesudas, Vani Jairam	Vallapan
