= Gold Souk Grande, Kochi =

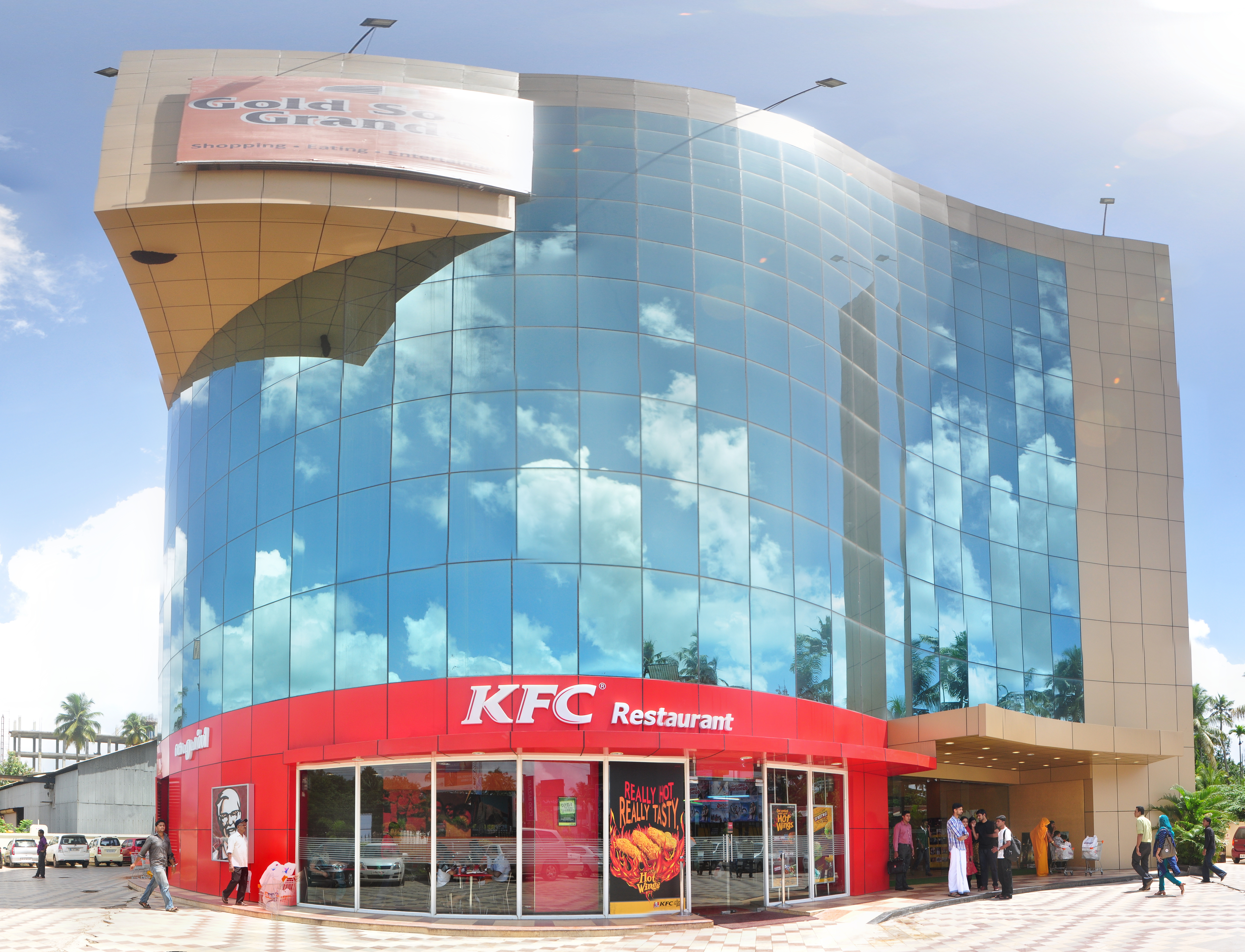
- Location: Kochi, India
- Coordinates: 9.9775°N 76.3161°E
- Address: NH Bypass Road, NH 66, Ponnurunni, Vytilla, Kochi - 682019
- Opened: March 2011
- Developer: Aerens Gold Souk Group
- Architect: WS Atkins
- Floor area: 500,000 sq ft (46,000 m^{2})
- Floors: B+G+4
- Parking: 1200

Gold Souk Grande is a shopping mall located in the Vytilla area of Kochi, India. The mall covered an area of approximately 500,000 sq ft (46,000 m^{2}), spread over five levels. It was opened to the public in March 2011, and subsequently, lost traction over the years and slowly neared its closure in the late 2010s and 2020s. The mall was part of the portfolio of properties owned and managed by the Gold Souk group, which has established several malls in various cities across India.

At the time of its inauguration, Gold Souk Grande was considered the largest mall in Kerala, featuring a collection of over 200 national and international brands.

Gold Souk Grande offered apparel, electronics, and lifestyle products. The mall also included food courts, entertainment zones, and multiplex cinemas.

As of 2025, Gold Souk Grande is largely deserted and devoid of retail stores altogether. The only remaining tenant is the KFC outlet on the ground floor, and the mall is in dilapidated condition.
