= Sakalakala Vallavan (1982 film) =

1982 film by S. P. Muthuraman

- Poster
- Directed by: S. P. Muthuraman
- Written by: Panchu Arunachalam
- Produced by: M. Kumaran; M. Saravanan; M. Balasubramaniam
- Starring: Kamal Haasan; Ambika; Raveendran; Thulasi
- Cinematography: Babu
- Edited by: R. Vittal
- Music by: Ilaiyaraaja
- Production company: AVM Productions
- Release date: 14 August 1982
- Running time: 137 minutes
- Country: India
- Language: Tamil

Sakalakala Vallavan (transl. Master of all arts) is a 1982 Indian Tamil-language masala film directed by S. P. Muthuraman and written by Panchu Arunachalam. The film stars Kamal Haasan, Ambika, Raveendran and Tulasi. Produced by AVM Productions, it revolves around a villager whose sister is raped by the village head's son when the former refuses to abide by his dictatorship. The villager vows to seek revenge and get his sister married to her rapist.

Sakalakala Vallavan was released on 14 August 1982. The film was a major commercial success and ran for over 175 days in theatres and was the highest-grossing film in Tamil cinema until 1989 when the record was broken by Apoorva Sagodharargal. It also made Haasan, then popular only with the elite, popular among the masses. The film was remade in Hindi as Abhimanyu (1989).

== Plot ==
Velu is a villager who manages the farm of his family. Ramaiah Pillai and his wife Parvathi are the landowners of the village. Parvathi cheats poor farmers and grabs their land and properties by lending money at a high rate of interest by mortgaging their properties. Their son Pazhani and daughter Geetha study in the city. Velu gets into issues with Parvathi's henchman when they try to cheat poor people. Due to this, Parvathi gets angry with Velu's family. Pazhani and Geetha complete their studies and return to the village. Geetha and Velu quarrel whenever they meet.

Velu's father Chinnaiah Pillai returns the money due to Parvathi through Pazhani. But when Velu goes to collect the promissory note from Pazhani, he lies that he has not received the money. Enraged, Velu beats him. Ramaiah comes to Velu's house, returns the promissory note and advises Velu to be calm. As revenge on Velu, Pazhani kidnaps and rapes Velu's sister Valli. Velu prevents her from committing suicide, and she decides to undo this disgrace is by marrying Pazhani. Velu pleads with Pazhani to marry Valli but he refuses, saying this is his revenge for the insult meted out to him.

Some time later, Ramaiah and Parvathi attend a New Year's Eve party and meet the former's old friend Sundaram, a US-returned businessman with his children Sam and Bobby (actually Velu and Valli in disguise). Parvathi takes her family to Sundaram's house and is impressed by his wealth and children. She proposes that they get married with her son and daughter. Both the marriages take place and later that night, Sam and Bobby reveal their true identities to their new spouses.

Parvathi and her family try to end the marriage, but Ramaiah warns them of dire consequences and tells them to live together amicably. Though Geetha initially behaves indifferently, she gradually gets attracted to Velu and starts living with him normally. However, Pazhani does not accept Valli and ill-treats her. He also develops a relationship with Lalitha, a club dancer. Learning of this, Velu goes disguised as a Dubai-based Sheikh and offers a large amount of money to Lalitha's brother to live with Lalitha.

Both Lalitha and her brother are happy and she spends more time with Velu. When Pazhani learns of this, he berates both Lalitha and her brother. Lalitha's brother decides to eliminate both Valli and Pazhani as they are impediments to his plans. He convinces Pazhani to bring Valli to an isolated bungalow and once they both enter, he sets the house on fire. By then, Lalitha, who is upset about her brother's plan, informs Velu about it, and he rushes to the place, defeats all the thugs (including Lalitha's brother) and saves both Pazhani and Valli. Pazhani realises his mistake and apologises to Valli and Velu; the family unites.

== Cast ==
- Kamal Haasan as Velusamy
- Ambika as Geetha
- Raveendran as Pazhani
- Tulasi as Valli
- V. K. Ramasamy as Ramaiah Pillai
- Thengai Srinivasan as Sundaram
- Y. G. Mahendran as Poonai
- Samikannu as Chinnaiah Pillai
- Pushpalatha as Parvathi
- Silk Smitha as Lalitha
- S. N. Parvathy as Sivagami

== Production ==
AVM Productions made the film to prove that Kamal Haasan was a "Master of all arts", keeping with the title Sakalakala Vallavan, which translates to the same. It was writer Panchu Arunachalam who came up with the title. The film was produced by M. Saravanan, M. Balasubramanian and M. S. Guhan. Cinematography was handled by Babu, and editing by R. Vittal. The film was launched in March 1982 with Rajinikanth attending the launch. The song "Illamai Idho Idho" was shot in a large king's court set created for a Kannada film, after suitable modifications by art director Chalam to show it as a five star hotel making it look like it has five sets. The set was decorated with night lamps and chandelier bought from Hyderabad. Shooting locations included Pollachi in Coimbatore, Kodambakkam in Madras (now Chennai), and the AVM Garden Villa in Madras. The song "Nethu Raatri" was shot at Meiyappan's bungalow and garden. The climax fight involving a burning building was shot in a set built at the eighth floor of AVM Studios in three days with three cameras. Haasan performed all the stunts in the film by himself. The final length of the film was 3,890 m (12,760 ft).

== Themes ==
Sakalakala Vallavan follows the "taming of the shrew" paradigm that was popular in Tamil cinema as early as the 1960s: "the city-bred girl making fun of the rustic and the latter turning the tables on her". Film producer and writer G. Dhananjayan compared the film to the William Shakespeare play The Taming of the Shrew for following the same concept. According to Saravanan, the film's plot was inspired from various Tamil films such as Kumari Penn, Periya Idathu Penn, Kalyanamam Kalyanam, Pattikada Pattanama and Savaale Samali.

== Soundtrack ==
The music was composed by Ilaiyaraaja, with lyrics by Vaalee. The song "Nila Kayuthu" is set in the Carnatic raga known as Madhyamavati. The disco song "Ilamai Idho Idho" remains one of the most popular New Year-themed songs in Tamil cinema, and is played on radio and television channels every New Year. According to Saravanan, the song initially did not have the words "Happy New Year"; S. P. Balasubrahmanyam, who realised the song is about New Year, decided to utter those words in high pitch.

In June 2013, A. Muthusamy of Honey Bee Music enhanced the songs from their original version on the film's soundtrack album to 5.1 surround sound.

All lyrics are written by Vaalee; all music is composed by Ilaiyaraaja.

Side A
No.	Title	Singer(s)	Length
1.	"Ilamai Edho Edho"	S. P. Balasubrahmanyam, Chorus
2.	"Nila Kayuthu"	Malaysia Vasudevan, S. Janaki
3.	"Kattavandi" (female)	S. P. Sailaja
4.	"Amman Koyil"	Ilaiyaraaja

Side B
No.	Title	Singer(s)	Length
1.	"Nethu Rathiri"	S. P. Balasubrahmanyam, S. Janaki
2.	"Kattavandi" (male)	Malaysia Vasudevan
3.	"Nila Kayuthu"	Malaysia Vasudevan, S. Janaki
4.	"Disco Music"	–

== Release and reception ==
Sakalakala Vallavan was released on 14 August 1982. The magazine Ananda Vikatan, in a review dated 5 September 1982, rated the film 42 out of 100, saying it would most probably collect the highest money and run for many days for the commercial masala offered to the audience and grand making. Thiraignani of Kalki praised Haasan's fights and dance, V. K. Ramasamy's comedy, Babu's cinematography and concluded calling the film as "Kalakala Vallavan". Despite facing competition from another Muthuraman-directed film Enkeyo Ketta Kural, released on the same day, Sakalakala Vallavan emerged the bigger success, and ran for over 175 days in theatres. G. Dhananjayan considered the film to have grossed over ₹1 crore (equivalent to ₹21 crore or US$2.1 million in 2026). The film was the highest-grossing film in Tamil cinema until 1989 when the record was broken by Apoorva Sagodharargal. It was dubbed into Telugu-language as Palleturi Simham and released on 10 December 1982.

== Legacy ==
Sakalakala Vallavan widened Kamal Haasan's audience base from the "classes" to a hero of the "masses". G. Dhananjayan noted that while Haasan was then considered an "A-centre star", the film took him "to the B and C centres". (Note: In Tamil cinema terminology, audiences are categorised into three centres: A centre (audiences in urban places like Chennai or Coimbatore), B centre (audiences in semi-urban places) and C centre (rural audiences).) Despite the film's success, Haasan thought little of the film, feeling it showed him as a "paid performer" rather an actor. He added, "It cleared certain notions in my head about the mistakes I shouldn't make." Sakalakala Vallavan inspired the title of a 2015 film which was not related to this film. Sudhir Srinivasan of The Hindu noted that both films were "about a gold-hearted villager and his taming of an urban woman". "Illamai Idho Idho" was used as the title for one of the segments of the 2020 anthology film Putham Pudhu Kaalai directed by Sudha Kongara.

== Bibliography ==
- Dhananjayan, G. (2011). The Best of Tamil Cinema, 1931 to 2010: 1977–2010. Galatta Media. OCLC 733724281.
- Saravanan, M. (2013) [2005]. AVM 60 Cinema (in Tamil) (3rd ed.). Rajarajan Pathippagam. OCLC 1158347612.
- Sundararaman (2007) [2005]. Raga Chintamani: A Guide to Carnatic Ragas Through Tamil Film Music (2nd ed.). Chennai: Pichhamal Chintamani. OCLC 295034757.
- Swaminathan, Roopa (2003). Kamalahasan, the consummate actor. Rupa & Co. ISBN 9788129103031.
- Muthuraman, S. P. (2017) [2005]. AVM Thandha SPM (in Tamil) (3rd ed.). Vikatan. OCLC 607342391.
