= Nandri Meendum Varuga =

- Title card
- Directed by: Mouli
- Written by: Mouli
- Produced by: M. Jayadevi
- Starring: Pratap Pothen; Suhasini
- Cinematography: P. C. Sreeram
- Edited by: V. Chakrapani
- Music by: Shyam
- Production company: Ponmalar International
- Release date: 9 July 1982
- Running time: 112 minutes
- Country: India
- Language: Tamil

Nandri Meendum Varuga (transl. Thank you, come again) is a 1982 Indian Tamil-language film directed by Mouli, starring Pratap Pothen and Suhasini, with Jaishankar in a significant role. Many actors and directors made guest appearances in the film, including Rajinikanth, Jayachitra, Radhika, Poornima Jayaram, Charuhasan, Thengai Srinivasan and Silk Smitha. The film was released on 9 July 1982.

== Cast ==
- Pratap Pothen
- Suhasini
- Master Suresh

Guest appearances

- Rajinikanth
- Jaishankar
- Jayachitra
- Radhika
- Poornima Jayaram
- Aruna
- Silk Smitha
- Vanitha Krishnachandran
- Thengai Srinivasan
- Charuhasan
- Raveendran
- I. V. Sasi
- Visu
- Mathioli Shanmugham

== Soundtrack ==
Soundtrack was composed by Shyam.

Track listing
| No. | Title | Singer(s) | Length |
|---|---|---|---|
| 1. | "Kaathal Kanavugalae" | S. P. Balasubrahmanyam, S. Janaki |
| 2. | "Pacha Milaka" | Kousalya |
| 3. | "Enna Vetkam" | S. Janaki |
| 4. | "Medaiyil Naane" | H. P. Haran |

== Release and reception ==
Nandri Meendum Varuga was released on 9 July 1982. Writing for Sunday Mid-Day, S. Shivakumar panned the film: "The film has all necessary ingredients from Smitha to the lead pair dying in the end. But a bad film remains bad and even a guest appearance by [Rajinikanth] hasn't helped this film at the box-office". Thiraignani of Kalki wrote Mouli's skill in creating individual scenes did not do in decorating the entire film.
