= Sattam Sirikkiradhu =

- Directed by: T. R. Ramanna
- Produced by: Indrarajan
- Starring: Vijayakanth; Jyothi; Prathap K. Pothan; Mucherla Aruna
- Cinematography: K. S. Rao
- Edited by: Kiruba Shankar
- Music by: T. Rajendar
- Production company: EVR Films
- Release date: 2 July 1982
- Country: India
- Language: Tamil

Sattam Sirikkiradhu (transl. The law is laughing) is a 1982 Indian Tamil-language film, directed by T. R. Ramanna. The film stars Vijayakanth, Jyothi, Pratap Pothen and Mucherla Aruna. It was released on 2 July 1982.

== Cast ==
- Vijayakanth as Subash
- Jyothi
- Pratap Pothen as Raj
- Mucherla Aruna
- Manorama

== Soundtrack ==
Soundtrack was composed by T. Rajendar, who also wrote the lyrics.

Track listing
No.	Title	Singer(s)	Length
1.	"Kanakambaram Poo Vangu"	T. S. Kalyanam
2.	"Malare Malare Unakindru"	P. Susheela
3.	"Kangal Kallanadu"	S. P. Balasubrahmanyam, S. Janaki
4.	"Malai Mugapinil"	Kalyanam, S. Janaki
