= Rajinikanth filmography =

Performances by Indian actor

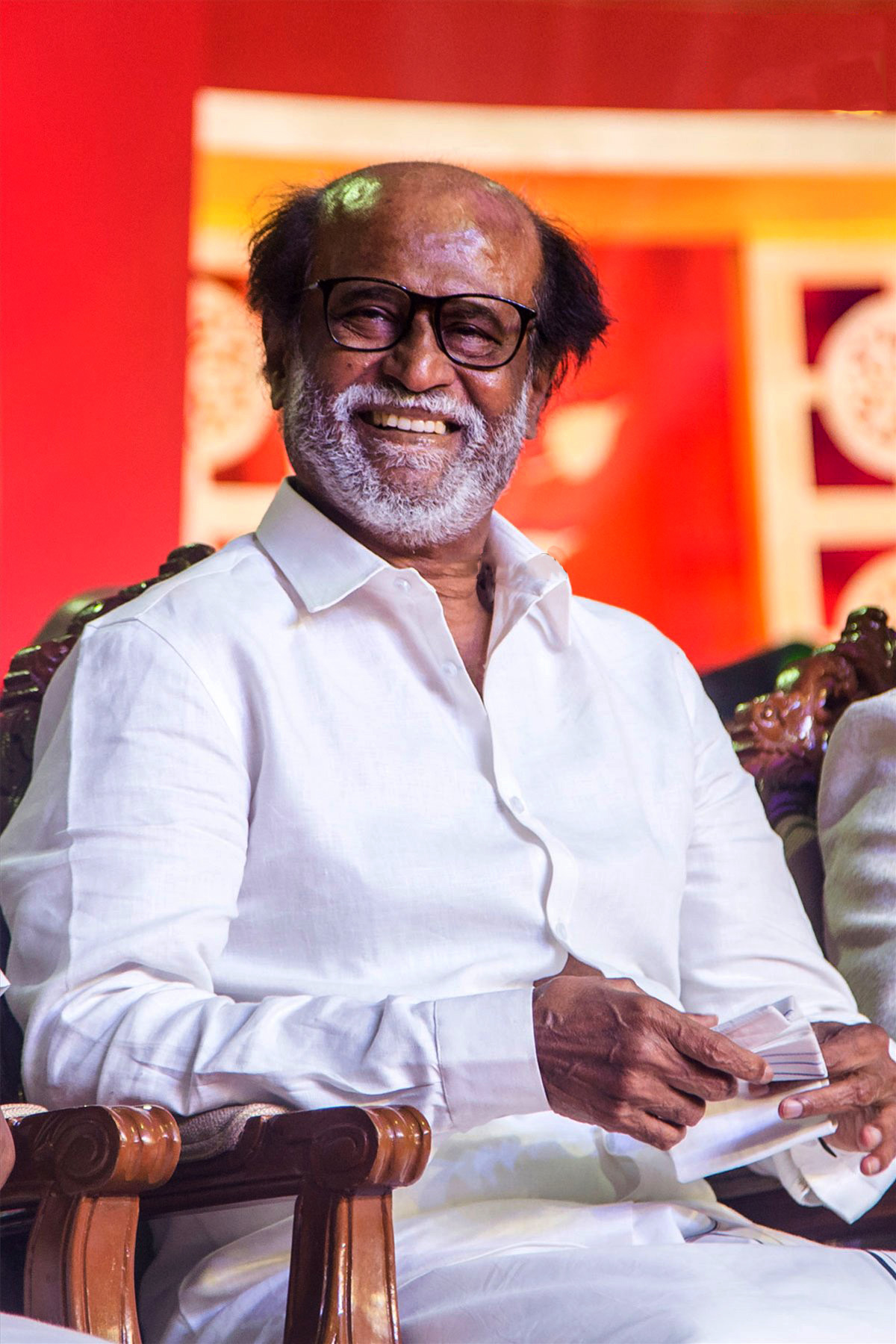
Rajinikanth at Inauguration of MGR Statue (2018)

Rajinikanth is an Indian actor, film producer, screenwriter and also a playback singer who has appeared predominantly in Tamil cinema. He began his film career by playing antagonistic and supporting roles before graduating to a lead actor. After starring in numerous commercially successful films throughout the 1980s and 1990s, he has continued to hold a matinée idol status in the popular culture of Tamil Nadu. Writing for Slate, Grady Hendrix called him the "biggest movie star you've probably never heard of," alluding to the fact that the West mainly considers Hindi cinema actors as Indian film stars. Rajinikanth has also worked in Hindi, Telugu, Kannada, Malayalam, and Bengali film industries.

He made his cinematic debut with K. Balachander's 1975 Tamil drama Apoorva Raagangal, in which he played a minor role of an abusive husband. He had his first major role in Balachander's Telugu drama film Anthuleni Katha (1976), and got his breakthrough in Tamil with Moondru Mudichu (1976)—also directed by Balachander. His style and mannerisms in the latter earned recognition from the audience. In 1977, he acted in 15 films, playing negative characters in most of them, including Avargal, 16 Vayathinile, Aadu Puli Attam and Gaayathri. He had positive roles in Kavikkuyil, the Kannada film Sahodarara Savaal, and the Telugu film Chilakamma Cheppindi, in which he played the protagonist for the first time in his career. His role as a failed lover in S. P. Muthuraman's Bhuvana Oru Kelvi Kuri (1977) won him critical acclaim. In 1978, he was cast as the main lead in the Tamil film Bairavi. The same year, he received critical acclaim for his roles in Mullum Malarum and Aval Appadithan; the former earned him a Tamil Nadu State Film Award Special Prize for Best Actor. He made his Malayalam cinema debut with I. V. Sasi's fantasy Allauddinum Albhutha Vilakkum (1979), an adaptation of a story from One Thousand and One Nights. By the end of the decade, he had worked in all South Indian languages and established a career in Tamil cinema.

He played dual roles in the action thriller Billa (1980), which was a remake of the Bollywood film Don (1978). It was his biggest commercial success to that point and gave him the action hero image. Murattu Kaalai released in 1980 was instrumental in establishing Rajinikanth as both an action hero and superstar. Balachander's Thillu Mullu (1981), the Tamil remake of the Bollywood film Gol Maal (1979), was Rajinikanth's first full-length comedy film. He played triple roles in the 1982 Tamil film Moondru Mugam, which earned him a special prize at the Tamil Nadu State Film Awards ceremony. The following year, he made his Bollywood debut with T. Rama Rao's Andhaa Kaanoon; it was among the top-grossing Bollywood films in 1983. Muthuraman's Nallavanukku Nallavan (1984) won him that year's Filmfare Award for Best Tamil Actor. In 1985, he portrayed the Hindu saint Raghavendra Swami in his 100th film Sri Raghavendrar, a box-office failure. In the latter half of the 1980s, he starred in several films in Tamil and Hindi, including Geraftaar (1985), Padikkadavan (1985), Mr. Bharath (1986), Dosti Dushmani (1986), Velaikaran (1987), Manithan (1987), Guru Sishyan (1988), Dharmathin Thalaivan (1988) and ChaalBaaz (1989). During this time, he made his debut in American cinema with a supporting role in the mystery adventure film Bloodstone (1988), a box-office failure.

Rajinikanth continued to act in Bollywood, often playing supporting roles in films such as Hum, and Phool Bane Angaray (both in 1991). Mani Ratnam's Tamil film Thalapathi (1991), based on the Indian epic Mahabharata, earned him critical acclaim. Suresh Krissna's Annaamalai (1992), P. Vasu's Mannan (1992) and Uzhaippali (1993) are among his box-office successes in Tamil. He made his debut as a screenwriter with Valli (1993), a commercial failure. (Note: He was also the producer.) The Suresh Krissna-directed Baashha, in which he played a crime boss, was a major commercial success in his career and earned him a "demigod" status in Tamil Nadu. Later that year he acted in K. S. Ravikumar's Muthu, which was dubbed into Japanese. (Note: The Japanese title is Mutu: Odoru Maharaja.) In Japan, the film grossed a record US$1.6 million in 1998 and was largely instrumental in creating a fan-base for Rajinikanth in the country. Padayappa (1999), his second collaboration with Ravikumar, went on to become the highest-grossing Tamil film to that point. In 2002 Rajinikanth produced, wrote and starred in the fantasy thriller Baba, which fell short of market expectations and incurred heavy losses for its distributors. After a three-year sabbatical, he returned to acting with the comedy horror film Chandramukhi (2005); it went on to become the highest-grossing Tamil film to that point, and its theatrical run lasted 126 weeks at Shanti Theatre in Chennai. (Note: The film broke the 63-year-old record set by the 1944 Tamil film Haridas, which ran for 112 weeks at Broadway Theatre, Madras.) Rajinikanth was paid ₹26 crore for his role in S. Shankar's Sivaji (2007), which made him the second-highest paid actor in Asia after Jackie Chan. He played dual roles, as a scientist and an andro-humanoid robot, in the science fiction film Enthiran (2010). It was India's most expensive production at the time of its release, and is among the highest-grossing Indian films of all time. (Note: The film grossed ₹ 2.89 billion (approximately US$43 million) worldwide, surpassing Sivaji's collection of ₹ 1.55 billion (approximately US$24 million). As of June 2016, it remains the highest-grossing Tamil film.) He played triple roles in the 2014 animated film Kochadaiiyaan, the first in India to be shot with motion capture technology; it was a commercial failure.

Two years later, Rajinikanth played a Malaysian Tamil crime boss in Pa. Ranjith's Kabali, which had the biggest weekend opening for an Indian film. In 2018, he had worked in two films, 2.0 and Kaala. 2.0 was the sequel to the earlier Enthiran (2010) and was produced at a budget of ₹400–600 crore, making it one of the most expensive Indian film made at the time of its release. It had grossed over ₹699 crore, securing the position of highest-grossing Indian film of 2018 and had ranked among the highest-grossing Indian films of all time. Alongside the commercial success of 2.0, Kaala, had grossed around ₹160 crore against the budget of ₹140 crore, making it commercially unsuccessful. After these films, he acted in Petta (2019), Darbar (2020), and Annaatthe (2021), which grossed around ₹219–250 crores, ₹202—250 crores, and ₹175–240 crores, respectively.

His recent blockbuster, Jailer (2023), directed by Nelson Dilipkumar, grossed over ₹600 crores, making it his second film to gross over the ₹500 and 600 crores mark, securing the position as the highest grossing Tamil film of 2023 and one of the highest grossing Indian films of all time.

== Filmography ==
Key
†	Denotes films that have not yet been released

List of Rajinikanth film acting credits
Year	Title	Role	Language	Notes	Ref.
1975	Apoorva Raagangal	Pandiyan	Tamil		
1976	Katha Sangama	Kondaji	Kannada		
1976	Anthuleni Katha	Murthy	Telugu		
1976	Premada Kanike	Criminal #2	Kannada	Photographic appearance	
1976	Moondru Mudichu	Prasath	Tamil		
1976	Baalu Jenu	Vasu	Kannada		
1977	Avargal	Ramanathan	Tamil		
1977	Kavikkuyil	Murugan	Tamil		
1977	Raghupathi Raghavan Rajaram	Veeraiyan	Tamil		
1977	Chilakamma Cheppindi	Ravi	Telugu		
1977	Bhuvana Oru Kelvi Kuri	Sampath	Tamil		
1977	Ondu Premada Kathe	Chairman of village panchayat	Kannada		
1977	16 Vayathinile	Parattai	Tamil		
1977	Sahodarara Savaal	Somashekhar	Kannada		
1977	Aadu Puli Attam	Rajini	Tamil		
1977	Gayathri	Rajarathnam	Tamil		
1977	Kumkuma Rakshe	Murali	Kannada		
1977	Aaru Pushpangal	Ravi	Tamil		
1977	Tholireyi Gadichindi	Chitti Babu	Telugu		
1977	Aame Katha	–	Telugu	Guest appearance	
1977	Galate Samsara	Sundar	Kannada		
1978	Shankar Salim Simon	Simon	Tamil		
1978	Kiladi Kittu	Inspector Srikanth	Kannada		
1978	Annadammula Savaal	Rangababu	Telugu		
1978	Aayiram Jenmangal	Ramesh	Tamil		
1978	Maathu Tappada Maga	Chandru	Kannada		
1978	Mangudi Minor	Kumar	Tamil		
1978	Bairavi	Mookaiah	Tamil		
1978	Ilamai Oonjal Aadukirathu	Murali	Tamil		
1978	Sadhurangam	Sundaresan	Tamil		
1978	Vanakkatukuriya Kathaliye	Joe	Tamil		
1978	Vayasu Pilichindi	Murali	Telugu		
1978	Mullum Malarum	Kaali	Tamil	Tamil Nadu State Film Award Special Prize	
1978	Iraivan Kodutha Varam	Rajnikanth	Tamil		
1978	Thappida Thala	Devu	Kannada		
1978	Thappu Thalangal	Devu	Tamil		
1978	Aval Appadithan	Thyagu	Tamil		
1978	Thai Meethu Sathiyam	Babu	Tamil		
1978	En Kelvikku Enna Bathil	Saravana	Tamil		
1978	Paavathin Sambalam	Himself	Tamil	Guest appearance	
1978	Justice Gopinath	Ravi	Tamil		
1978	Priya	Ganesh	Tamil		
1978	Priya	Ganesh	Kannada		
1979	Kuppathu Raja	Raja	Tamil		
1979	Iddaru Asadhyule	Bhaskar	Telugu		
1979	Allauddinum Albhutha Vilakkum	Kamruddin	Malayalam	Bilingual film	
1979	Allaudinaum Arputha Vilakkum	Kamruddin	Tamil	Bilingual film	
1979	Ninaithale Inikkum	Deepak	Tamil	Bilingual film	
1979	Andamaina Anubhavam	Dilip	Telugu	Bilingual film	
1979	Thaayillamal Naan Illai	Bichwa Bakri	Tamil	Guest appearance	
1979	Dharma Yuddham	Vijay	Tamil		
1979	Naan Vazhavaippen	Michael D'Souza	Tamil		
1979	Tiger	Rashid	Telugu		
1979	Aarilirunthu Arubathu Varai	Santhanam	Tamil		
1979	Annai Oru Aalayam	Vijay	Tamil		
1979	Amma Evarikkaina Amma	Vijay	Telugu		
1980	Billa	David Billa, Rajappa (Note: Rajinikanth plays two different characters.)	Tamil		
1980	Natchathiram	Himself	Tamil	Guest appearance	
1980	Ram Robert Rahim	Inspector Ram	Telugu		
1980	Anbukku Naan Adimai	Gopinath	Tamil		
1980	Kaali	Kaali	Tamil		
1980	Kaali	Kaali	Telugu		
1980	Mayadari Krishnudu	Krishnudu	Telugu		
1980	Naan Potta Savaal	Ramu (Shiva) (Note: Rajinikanth plays one character with two names.)	Tamil		
1980	Johnny	Johnny, Vidyasagar	Tamil		
1980	Ellam Un Kairasi	Raja	Tamil		
1980	Polladhavan	Manohar	Tamil		
1980	Murattu Kaalai	Kaalaiyan	Tamil		
1981	Thee	Rajashekar	Tamil		
1981	Kazhugu	Raja	Tamil		
1981	Thillu Mullu	Chandran (Indiran)	Tamil		
1981	Garjanai	Vijay	Tamil	Trilingual film	
1981	Garjanam	Vijay	Malayalam	Trilingual film	
1981	Garjane	Vijay	Kannada	Trilingual film	
1981	Netrikkan	Chakravarthi, Santhosh	Tamil		
1981	Ranuva Veeran	Raghu	Tamil		
1982	Pokkiri Raja	Ramesh, Raja	Tamil		
1982	Thanikattu Raja	Suryaprakash	Tamil		
1982	Ranga	Ranganathan	Tamil		
1982	Pudukavithai	Anand	Tamil		
1982	Nandri, Meendum Varuga	Himself	Tamil	Guest appearance	
1982	Enkeyo Ketta Kural	Kumaran	Tamil		
1982	Moondru Mugam	SP Alex Pandian IPS, Arun, John (Note: Rajinikanth plays three different characters.)	Tamil	Tamil Nadu State Film Award Special Prize	
1982	Agni Sakshi	Himself	Tamil	Guest appearance	
1983	Paayum Puli	Bharani	Tamil		
1983	Uruvangal Maralam	Himself (Raghavendrar)	Tamil	Guest appearance	
1983	Thudikkum Karangal	Gopi	Tamil		
1983	Andhaa Kaanoon	Vijay Kumar Singh	Hindi		
1983	Thai Veedu	Raju	Tamil		
1983	Sivappu Sooriyan	Vijay	Tamil		
1983	Jeet Hamaari	Raju	Hindi		
1983	Adutha Varisu	Kannan	Tamil		
1983	Thanga Magan	Arun	Tamil		
1984	Meri Adalat	Inspector Ashok	Hindi		
1984	Naan Mahan Alla	Vishwanath	Tamil		
1984	Thambikku Entha Ooru	Balu	Tamil		
1984	Kai Kodukkum Kai	Kaalimuthu	Tamil		
1984	Idhe Naa Savaal	Ramu (Shiva)	Telugu		
1984	Anbulla Rajinikanth	Himself	Tamil		
1984	Gangvaa	Gangvaa	Hindi		
1984	Nallavanukku Nallavan	Manikkam	Tamil	Filmfare Award for Best Actor – Tamil	
1984	John Jani Janardhan	John Mendez / Janardhan Gupta / Jani	Hindi		
1985	Nyayam Meere Cheppali	Inspector Aathmaram	Telugu	Guest appearance	
1985	Naan Sigappu Manithan	Vijay	Tamil		
1985	Mahaguru	Vijay "Mahaguru"	Hindi		
1985	Un Kannil Neer Vazhinthal...	Ravi	Tamil		
1985	Wafadaar	Ranga	Hindi		
1985	Sri Raghavendrar	Sri Raghavendrar	Tamil		
1985	Geraftaar	Inspector Hussain	Hindi	Cameo	
1985	Yaar?	Himself	Tamil	Guest appearance	
1985	Bewafai	Ranveer	Hindi		
1985	Padikkadavan	Rajendran	Tamil		
1986	Mr. Bharath	Bharath	Tamil		
1986	Naan Adimai Illai	Vijay	Tamil		
1986	Jeevana Poratam	Ravi	Telugu		
1986	Viduthalai	Raja	Tamil		
1986	Bhagwaan Dada	Bhagwan Dada	Hindi		
1986	Kodai Mazhai	Himself	Tamil	Guest appearance	
1986	Asli Naqli	Birju Ustad	Hindi		
1986	Dosti Dushmani	Ranjeet	Hindi		
1986	Maaveeran	Raja (Maaveeran)	Tamil	Also co-producer	
1987	Daku Hasina	Mangal Singh	Hindi	Cameo	
1987	Velaikaran	Raghupathi	Tamil		
1987	Insaaf Kaun Karega	Vikram Singh	Hindi		
1987	Oorkavalan	Kangeyan	Tamil		
1987	Manithan	Raja	Tamil		
1987	Manathil Urudhi Vendum	Himself	Tamil	Guest appearance	
1987	Uttar Dakshin	Shankaran	Hindi		
1988	Tamacha	Vikram Pratap Singh	Hindi		
1988	Guru Sishyan	Raja (Guru)	Tamil		
1988	Dharmathin Thalaivan	Balasubramanian, Shankar	Tamil		
1988	Bloodstone	Shyam Sabu	English		
1988	Kodi Parakkuthu	DCP Erode Shivagiri (Dhadha)	Tamil		
1989	Rajadhi Raja	Rajashekar, Chinnarasu	Tamil		
1989	Gair Kanooni	Adam Khan, Azam Khan	Hindi	Cameo	
1989	Siva	Siva (Tiger)	Tamil		
1989	Raja Chinna Roja	Raja (Kumar)	Tamil		
1989	Mappillai	Aarumugam	Tamil		
1989	Bhrashtachar	Abdul Sattar	Hindi	Cameo	
1989	ChaalBaaz	Jackie Pandyekar (Jaggu)	Hindi		
1989	Hum Mein Shahenshah Koun	Vijay Singh	Hindi	Unreleased	
1990	Panakkaran	Muthu	Tamil		
1990	Periya Idathu Pillai	Himself	Tamil	Guest appearance	
1990	Athisaya Piravi	Kaalai, Balu	Tamil		
1991	Dharma Durai	Dharma Durai	Tamil		
1991	Hum	Inspector Kumar Malhotra	Hindi		
1991	Farishtay	Inspector Arjun Tange (Note: His character's full name is Ranoji Rao Shivaji Rao Gaekwad Jadichmul Arjun Thange.)	Hindi		
1991	Khoon Ka Karz	Kishan	Hindi		
1991	Phool Bane Angaray	Inspector Ranjeet Singh	Hindi		
1991	Nattukku Oru Nallavan	Inspector Subhash	Tamil		
1991	Shanti Kranti	Inspector Subhash	Hindi		
1991	Thalapathi	Surya	Tamil		
1992	Mannan	Krishnan	Tamil	Also playback singer	
1992	Tyagi	Shankar G. "Dadhu" Dayal	Hindi		
1992	Annaamalai	Annaamalai	Tamil		
1992	Pandian	Pandian IPS	Tamil		
1993	Insaniyat Ke Devta	Anwar	Hindi		
1993	Yajaman	Kanthavel Vanavarayan	Tamil		
1993	Uzhaippali	Thamizharasan (Tamilazhagan)	Tamil		
1993	Valli	Veeraiyan	Tamil	Extended cameo; also producer and screenwriter	
1994	Veera	Muthuveerappan	Tamil		
1995	Baashha	Manikam (Manik Baasha)	Tamil		
1995	Pedarayudu	Paparayudu	Telugu	Special appearance	
1995	Aatank Hi Aatank	Munna	Hindi		
1995	Muthu	Muthu, Zamindar	Tamil	Tamil Nadu State Film Award for Best Actor	
1995	Bhagya Debata	Singer	Bengali	Guest appearance	
1997	Arunachalam	Arunachalam, Vedachalam	Tamil		
1999	Padayappa	Aarupadayappan	Tamil	Tamil Nadu State Film Award for Best Actor; also lead story writer and producer	
2000	Bulandi	Ghajraj Thakur	Hindi	Special appearance	
2002	Baba	Baba, Mahavatar Babaji (Voice-Over)	Tamil	Also producer and screenwriter	
2005	Chandramukhi	Dr Saravanan, Vettaiyan Raja	Tamil	Tamil Nadu State Film Award for Best Actor	
2007	Sivaji: The Boss	Sivaji Arumugam (M. G. Ravichandran)	Tamil	Tamil Nadu State Film Award for Best Actor; Nominated—Filmfare Award for Best Actor – Tamil	
2008	Kuselan	Ashok Kumar	Tamil	Extended cameo	
2008	Kathanayakudu	Ashok Kumar	Telugu	Extended cameo	
2010	Enthiran	Vaseegaran, Chitti	Tamil	Nominated—Filmfare Award for Best Actor – Tamil	
2011	Ra.One	Chitti (Himself)	Hindi	Cameo, computer generated	
2014	Kochadaiiyaan	Kochadaiiyaan, Ranadheeran, Senadheeran	Tamil	Also playback singer	
2014	Lingaa	K. Lingeswaran, Raja Lingeswaran	Tamil		
2016	Kabali	Kabaliswaran (Note: alias Kabali)	Tamil	Nominated—Filmfare Award for Best Actor – Tamil	
2017	Cinema Veeran	Narrator	Tamil	Documentary	
2018	Kaala	Karikaalan Vengaiyan (Note: alias Kaala)	Tamil		
2018	2.0	Vaseegaran, Chitti, Kutty	Tamil		
2019	Petta	Petta Velan (Kaali)	Tamil		
2020	Darbar	Aaditya Arunachalam IPS	Tamil		
2021	Annaatthe	Kaalaiyan (Annaatthe)	Tamil		
2023	Jailer	"Tiger" Muthuvel Pandian	Tamil		
2024	Lal Salaam	D. G. Mohideen (Note: alias Mohideen Bhai)	Tamil	Extended cameo	
2024	Vettaiyan	SP V. Athiyan IPS (Vettaiyan)	Tamil		
2025	Coolie	Devaraj (Note: alias Deva)	Tamil		
2026	Jailer 2	"Tiger" Muthuvel Pandian	Tamil		
2027	Dharman †	TBA	Tamil	Filming	
2028	RK x KH reunion film †	TBA	Tamil	Pre-production	

== Television ==
List of Rajinikanth television credits
Year	Title	Role	Language	Notes	Ref.
2020	Into The Wild With Bear Grylls	Himself	English	Guest	

== See also ==
- List of awards and nominations received by Rajinikanth

== Bibliography ==
- Ramachandran, Naman (2014) [2012]. Rajinikanth: The Definitive Biography. New Delhi: Penguin Books. ISBN 978-0-670-08620-7. OCLC 825198202.
