= List of awards and nominations received by Rajinikanth =

Rajinikanth awards and nominations
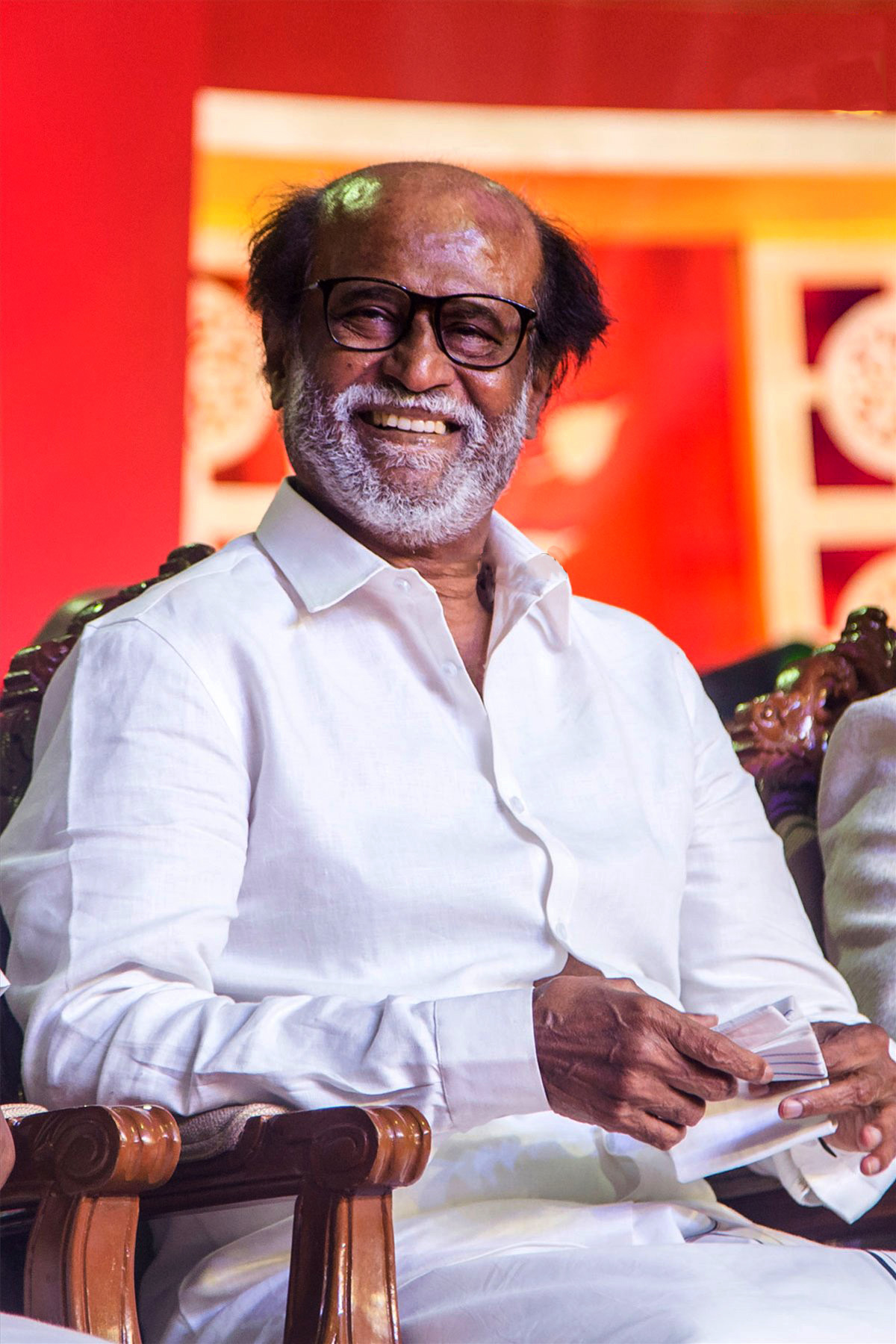
- Rajinikanth in 2018
Awards and nominations
Award	Wins	Nominations
Cinema Express Awards	7	7
Filmfare Awards South	1	19
Filmfans Association Awards	8	8
Honorary Awards	9	9
NDTV Awards	4	4
South Screen Awards	1	1
Tamil Nadu State Film Awards	8	8
Vijay Awards	5	5
National Film Award	1	1

Totals (Note: Certain award groups do not simply award one winner. They acknowledge several different recipients, have runners-up, and have third place. Since this is a specific recognition and is different from losing an award, runner-up mentions are considered wins in this award tally. For simplification and to avoid errors, each award in this list has been presumed to have had a prior nomination.)
- Wins: 43
- Nominations: 60

Rajinikanth is an Indian actor. In a career spanning five decades Rajinikanth has won so many awards from numerous associations. The Government of India honoured him with the Padma Bhushan in 2000 and the Padma Vibhushan in 2016, India's third and second highest civilian honours respectively, the Dadasaheb Phalke Award in 2019, the highest Indian award in the field of cinema, and the IFFI Satyajit Ray Lifetime Achievement Award for his contributions to world cinema. He has won numerous film awards including one National Film Award, eight Tamil Nadu State Film Awards, a Nandi Award, one Filmfare Award South and two Maharashtra State Film Awards.

Rajinikanth received the Kalaimamani award in 1984 and the M. G. R. Award in 1989, both from the Government of Tamil Nadu. In 1995, the South Indian Film Artistes' Association presented him with the Kalaichelvam Award. He was selected as the Indian Entertainer of the Year for 2007 by NDTV, competing against the likes of Shahrukh Khan. The Government of Maharashtra honoured him with the Raj Kapoor Award the same year. He received the Chevalier Sivaji Ganesan Award for Excellence in Indian Cinema at the 4th Vijay Awards. Rajinikanth was also named one of the most influential persons in South Asia by Asiaweek. He was named by Forbes India as the most influential Indian of the year 2010.

In 2011, he was awarded the Entertainer of the Decade Award by NDTV for the year 2010 by the then Indian Minister for Home Affairs P. Chidambaram. In December 2013, he was honoured by NDTV as one among the "25 Greatest Global Living Legends". In 2014, he was presented with the Indian Film Personality of the Year Award at the 45th IFFI.

== Civilian honours ==
No.	Image	Ribbon	Decoration	Field	Conferred date	Conferred by	Presenter
1			Padma Bhushan (Third Highest Civilian Award of India)	Art	26 January 2000	Government of India	K. R. Narayanan
2.			Padma Vibhushan (second Highest Civilian Award of India)	Art	25 January 2016	Government of India	Pranab Mukherjee

== National Film Awards ==
Year	Award	Honoring body
2021	Dadasaheb Phalke Award	Directorate of Film Festivals

== International Film Festival of India ==
Year	Award
2014	Indian Film Personality of the Year Award
2019	Golden Jubilee ICON Award
2025	Satyajit Ray Lifetime Achievement Award

== Maharashtra State Film Award ==
Year	Award
2006	Raj Kapoor Award
2012	Rajiv Gandhi Award

== Nandi Awards ==
Year	Award	Honoring body
2016	NTR National Award	Nandi Awards

== NDTV Award ==
Year	Award
2007	Indian Entertainer of the Year
2011	Entertainer of the Decade
2011	Most Stylish Actor
2013	The 25 Greatest Global Living Legends

== Cinema Express Awards ==
Year	Film(s)	Category	Outcome
1984	Nallavanuku Nallavan	Best Actor	Won
1985	Sri Raghavendra	Best Actor	Won
1988	Bloodstone	Best Achiever	Won
1991	Thalapathy	Best Actor	Won
1992	Annaamalai	Best Actor	Won
1993	Valli	Best Story Writer	Won
1995	Baashha, Muthu	Best Actor	Won

== Filmfans Association Awards ==
Year	Film(s)	Category	Outcome
1979	Aarilirunthu Arubathu Varai	Best Actor	Won
1982	Enkeyo Ketta Kural	Best Actor	Won
1984	Nallavanuku Nallavan	Best Actor	Won
1985	Sri Raghavendra	Best Actor	Won
1991	Thalapathy	Best Actor	Won
1992	Annaamalai	Best Actor	Won
1993	Valli	Best Story Writer	Won
1995	Baashha, Muthu	Best Actor	Won

== Filmfare Awards South ==
Rajinikanth won the Filmfare Award for Best Actor – Tamil in 1984 from a total of eighteen nominations, his first and only win in the category.

Year	Film(s)	Category	Outcome	Ref.
1977	Chilakamma Cheppindi	Best Actor – Telugu	Nominated	
1978	Mullum Malarum	Best Actor – Tamil	Nominated	
1979	Aarilirunthu Arubathu Varai	Best Actor – Tamil	Nominated	
1980	Johnny	Best Actor – Tamil	Nominated	
1981	Thillu Mullu	Best Actor – Tamil	Nominated	
1982	Moondru Mugam	Best Actor – Tamil	Nominated	
1984	Nallavanukku Nallavan	Best Actor – Tamil	Won	
1987	Velaikaran	Best Actor – Tamil	Nominated	
1990	Panakkaran	Best Actor – Tamil	Nominated	
1991	Thalapathi	Best Actor – Tamil	Nominated	
1992	Annaamalai	Best Actor – Tamil	Nominated	
1993	Uzhaippali	Best Actor – Tamil	Nominated	
1995	Baashha	Best Actor – Tamil	Nominated	
1995	Muthu	Best Actor – Tamil	Nominated	
1997	Arunachalam	Best Actor – Tamil	Nominated	
1999	Padayappa	Best Actor – Tamil	Nominated	
2007	Sivaji	Best Actor – Tamil	Nominated	
2010	Enthiran	Best Actor – Tamil	Nominated	
2016	Kabali	Best Actor – Tamil	Nominated	

== South Screen Awards ==
Year	Film	Category	Outcome
1995	Peddarayudu	Best Actor	Won

== Tamil Nadu State Film Awards ==
Year	Film	Category	Outcome
1978	Mullum Malarum	Special Award (Best Actor)	Won
1982	Moondru Mugam	Special Award (Best Actor)	Won
1989	Tribute for his Contribution for Tamil Cinema	Honorary Award - M.G.R. Award	Won
1999	Padayappa	Best Film (Producer)	Won
1995	Muthu	Best Actor	Won
1999	Padayappa	Best Actor	Won
2005	Chandramukhi	Best Actor	Won
2007	Sivaji	Best Actor	Won

== Vijay Awards ==
Year	Film	Category	Outcome
2008	Sivaji	Favourite Hero	Won
2011	Lifetime Achievement Award	Chevalier Sivaji Ganesan Award Ganesan Award for Excellence in Indian Cinema	Won
2012	Enthiran	Favourite Hero	Won
2012	Enthiran	Best Villain	Won
2015	Lingaa	Favourite Hero	Won

== See also ==
- Rajinikanth filmography
