= Mavadi Kadepathar =

Village in Maharashtra

- village
- Location in Maharashtra, India Mavadi Kadepathar (India)
- Coordinates: 18.16°N 74.13°E
- Country: India
- State: Maharashtra
- District: Pune district

Languages
  - Official: Marathi
- Time zone: UTC+5:30 (IST)
- PIN: 412303
- Nearest city: Purandar

Mavadi Kadepathar is a village in the Purandar taluka of Pune district in Maharashtra, India. Mavdi Kade Pathar/Mawadi Kade Pathar are other variations for the same name.

== Notable personalities ==
- Indian movie superstar Rajnikanth's ancestral(Gaikwad’s) origins lie in the village.
