= Priya (1978 film) =

- Theatrical release poster in Tamil
- Directed by: S. P. Muthuraman
- Screenplay by: Panchu Arunachalam
- Story by: Sujatha
- Produced by: S. P. Tamilarasi
- Starring: Rajinikanth; Sridevi; Ambareesh; Aznah Hamid
- Cinematography: Babu
- Edited by: R. Vittal
- Music by: Ilaiyaraaja
- Production company: S. P. T Films
- Release dates: 22 December 1978 (Tamil); 12 January 1979 (Kannada)
- Running time: 148 minutes (Tamil)
- Country: India
- Languages: Tamil; Kannada

Priya is an Indian thriller film directed by S. P. Muthuraman, starring Rajinikanth, Sridevi (as the title character), Ambareesh, and Aznah Hamid. It was simultaneously made in Tamil and Kannada languages. The film shares its title with a novel by Sujatha, but actually adapts from multiple works by the writer including the aforementioned novel. The Tamil version was released on 22 December 1978, and the Kannada version on 12 January 1979. It was dubbed and released in Telugu as Ajeyudu which released on 10 March 1979 and was also dubbed in Hindi as Love in Singapore in 1983. The soundtrack of this film is recorded using stereophonic sound technology for the first time in Tamil cinema. It was Sridevi's only Kannada film as a lead actress as well as Rajinikanth's penultimate Kannada film as a lead actor.

== Plot ==
Ganesh is a lawyer who specialises in saving kidnapped people without paying any ransom. He is also a parttime stage actor. Priya is a movie star who is exploited by her producer Janardhan and her uncle Kaalimuthu. Janardhan has such control over Priya's financial and personal affairs that he refuses to let her marry her boyfriend Bharath. Before she flies off to Singapore for a film shoot, Priya seeks the help of lawyer Ganesh to escape from Janardhan.

Ganesh goes to Singapore as Priya's guardian. Circumstances force him to act in Priya's film. He also falls in love with a Malaysian Tamil girl named Subadhra. Ganesh faces several challenges from Kaalimuthu's and Jaanardhan's henchmen but manages to keep Priya safe.

Priya eventually gets kidnapped and police find her dead body the next day. Ganesh questions Janardhan who accepts kidnapping Priya, but says she escaped from his clutches. Kaalimuthu says a similar story. A random person approaches Ganesh and says he has some information about Priya. He then takes the blindfolded Ganesh and Bharath to a house, and they are shocked to see Priya alive there. Kidnappers demand $1 million and release just Ganesh.

Ganesh returns to the house using audio clues he heard on his previous trip. He sings a cryptic song on the streets that Priya recognizes and reveals her location. Ganesh fights all the bad guys, reunites Priya and Bharath, and returns to India with Subadhra.

== Cast ==
- Rajinikanth as Ganesh
- Sridevi as Priya
- Aznah Hamid as Subadhra
- Ambareesh as Bharath
- Major Sundarrajan / K. S. Ashwath as Janardhan
- Thengai Srinivasan as a film director
- Shivaram
- K. Natraj
- Thideer Kannaiah as Vasanth

== Production ==
Priya was adapted from the novel of the same name by Sujatha. The film's screenplay and dialogues were written by Panchu Arunachalam. The film was produced by his brother Subbu. Rajinikanth portrayed the detective Ganesh created by Sujatha for his novels for which he received ₹110,000 (equivalent to ₹3.0 million or US$31,000 in 2023) for acting in the film while Ambareesh played the role based on Ganesh's partner Vasanth.

The film was made as a bilingual both in Tamil and Kannada. Since the novel was set in Singapore, S. P. Muthuraman planned to shoot the film in there, Kuala Lumpur and Hong Kong and was careful of shooting it within the budget and after finalising the script, Muthuraman along with Subbu and cinematographer Babu went on a recce to these places and finalise the locations and fixed all the necessary places to shoot. The filming wrapped within a month.

== Soundtrack ==
The soundtrack was composed by Ilaiyaraaja. It was recorded using stereophonic sound technology for the first time in Tamil cinema using eight tracks. Ilaiyaraaja revealed he wanted to use this technology in Annakili (1976); however since he was a debutant, sound engineers did not encourage him that time. When Ilaiyaraaja came to know that K. J. Yesudas had equipments for stereophonic technology, he acquired them. The pallavi of the song "Akarai Cheemai Azhaginile" is based on the song "Kites" by Simon Dupree and the Big Sound. The song "Hey Paadal Ondru" is set in the Carnatic raga known as Kapi.

All lyrics are written by Panchu Arunachalam.

Tamil track list
| No. | Title | Singer(s) | Length |
|---|---|---|---|
| 1. | "Ye Paadal Ondru" | K. J. Yesudas, S. Janaki | 4:32 |
| 2. | "Akarai Cheemai Azhaginile" | K. J. Yesudas | 4:21 |
| 3. | "Darling Darling" | P. Susheela | 4:39 |
| 4. | "En Uyir Nee Thaane" | K. J. Yesudas, Jency Anthony | 4:51 |
| 5. | "Sri Ramanin Sri Deviye" | K. J. Yesudas | 4:02 |
| Total length: | | | 22:25 |

Kannada track list
| No. | Title | Singer(s) | Length |
|---|---|---|---|
| 1. | "Kavithe Neenu" | K. J. Yesudas, S. Janaki | 4:32 |
| 2. | "Sagaradacheya" | K. J. Yesudas | 4:21 |
| 3. | "Darling Darling" | S. Janaki | 4:39 |
| 4. | "Nannali Neenagi" | K. J. Yesudas, S. Janaki | 4:51 |
| 5. | "Thangaaliye" | K. J. Yesudas | 4:02 |
| Total length: | | | 22:25 |

== Reception ==
Kousikan of Kalki found Priya to be entirely different from Sujatha's novel but praised the locations and cinematography. Naagai Dharuman of Anna praised the acting of the cast except for Rajinikanth, while also praising cinematography, music and direction. Another Tamil weekly wrote, "if this is what Panju wanted to do to Sujatha's novel he needn't have opted it for it at all". Responding to the criticism, Arunachalam said the original novel had dialogues between two characters over 40 pages and audience would not have patience if it was faithfully presented onscreen, so he made changes keeping the "very ordinary filmgoer in mind". Nevertheless, as Rediff.com noted in 2009, "the main characters were completely unrecognisable", prompting Sujatha to "complain vociferously about his characters being mauled".

== Allegations ==
The footage of the famous car chase sequence from the Steve McQueen film Bullitt was edited and spliced into the climax scene of this film; however, the allegations that ensued was that it was done so without permission.

== Bibliography ==
- Nayak, Satyarth (2019). Sridevi: The Eternal Screen Goddess. India: Penguin Random House. ISBN 9789353056780.
- Ramachandran, Naman (2014) [2012]. Rajinikanth: The Definitive Biography. New Delhi: Penguin Books. ISBN 978-0-14-342111-5.
