= Aadu Puli Attam (1977 film) =

1977 film by S. P. Muthuraman

Aadu Puli Aattam
- Theatrical release poster
- Directed by: S. P. Muthuraman
- Screenplay by: S. P. Muthuraman
- Story by: Mahendran
- Produced by: M. Santhinarayanan
- Starring: Kamal Haasan; Sripriya; Rajinikanth; Sangeetha
- Cinematography: Babu
- Edited by: R. Vittal; N. Damodaran
- Music by: Vijaya Bhaskar
- Production company: Swarnambika Productions
- Release date: 30 September 1977
- Running time: 137 minutes
- Country: India
- Language: Tamil

Aadu Puli Aattam (transl. The lambs and tigers game) is a 1977 Indian Tamil-language action film directed by S. P. Muthuraman, starring Kamal Haasan, Rajinikanth, Sangeetha and Sripriya. Later in 1978, S. P. Muthuraman remade the film in Telugu as Yetthuku Pai Yetthu. A few scenes were remade in Telugu with actors like Satyanarayana and Allu Ramalingaiah and the rest of the film was dubbed.

== Plot ==
The film starts with Kamal and Rajini, close associates, playing a game in a bar. When the game is finished, the couple, along with their gang ransack the bar and loot the money. In brief, this is the story of a young man who dreams of becoming a policeman, but decides to oppose the police and heads a gang of thieves. When he discovers that his associates are much worse than thieves, he joins the police and nabs the criminals.

== Cast ==
- Kamal Haasan as Madhan
- Rajinikanth as Rajini
- Sripriya as Hema
- Sangeetha as Mary
- Major Sundarrajan as Inspector of police
- Thengai Srinivasan as Krishnamoorthy Iyer
- Jayachandran as Balu
- K. Natraj as Natraj
- Muthaiah as Muthaiah
- Aparna
- Aanandhi
- M. S. Draupadi
- T. K. S. Natarajan
- Nanjil Nalini

== Production ==
The film was directed by S. P. Muthuraman, written by Mahendran and produced by M. Santhinarayanan, who began life as a costume-maker before rising to become a film producer. The song "Uravo Pudumai", picturised on Kamal Haasan and Sangeeta, was filmed on the area of Kundrathur and Thiruneermalai near Chennai. During a fight scene on Mount Road, Kamal Haasan was injured on set. Haasan fixed his shoulder dislocation with a turkey towel and an iron rod on the sets. He returned to the shot after taking just a 10-minute break. The film is noted for Rajinikanth's famous phrase "Idhu thaan Rajini style" (This is Rajini Style), which he says several times throughout the film. This film was shot in black-and-white. It was given an "U" (unrestricted) certificate by the Central Board of Film Certification after eight cuts. The final length of the film was 3,947.05 metres (12,949.6 ft).

== Soundtrack ==
All songs composed by Vijaya Bhaskar.

Track listing
No.	Title	Lyrics	Singer(s)	Length
1.	"Vaanukku Thanthai"	Kannadasan	S. P. Balasubrahmanyam, L. R. Anjali	4:22
2.	"Maname Solaiyam"	Panchu Arunachalam	Vani Jairam	4:21
3.	"Poonguyil Paadudhu"	Poovai Senguttuvan	Vani Jairam	2:58
4.	"Uravo Pudumai"	Panchu Arunachalam	S. P. Balasubrahmanyam	4:13
Total length:				15:54

== Release ==
Aadu Puli Attam was released on 30 September 1977, and became a commercial success.

== Bibliography ==
- Ramachandran, Naman (2014) [2012]. Rajinikanth: The Definitive Biography. New Delhi: Penguin Books. ISBN 978-0-14-342111-5.
