= Insaaf Kaun Karega =

- Poster
- Directed by: Sudarshan Nag
- Produced by: Suresh Bokadia
- Starring: Dharmendra; Rajinikanth; Jaya Prada; Madhavi
- Edited by: Aatri Dwivedi
- Music by: Laxmikant-Pyarelal
- Release date: 19 June 1987
- Running time: 156 minutes
- Country: India
- Language: Hindi

Insaaf Kaun Karega (transl. Who will deliver justice?) is a 1987 Indian action film directed by Sudarsan Nag and written by K. C. Bokadia. It stars Dharmendra, Rajinikanth, Jaya Prada, Madhavi. It was a hit at the box office. It was clashed with Vinod Khanna's movie Insaaf which was his comeback movie after 5 year long hiatus.

== Plot ==
Jageera Singh has always lived a life of crime, drinking alcohol and frequenting brothels, even though he is married to pregnant Laxmi, and has a son named Vikram. On the day of Laxmi's delivery, Jageera is busy molesting young Paro. Laxmi gives birth to a daughter, Jyoti, who is subsequently abducted. Jageera disappears from Laxmi's life, and she goes to live with a female friend who passes away, leaving Laxmi with the responsibility of also looking after her son, Virendra alias Veeru. Years later Jageera surfaces and joins forces with smuggler and prominent citizen, Bhanupratap. When Police Inspector Vikram's diligence causes problems for Bhanupratap, Jageera offers to kill Vikram, especially when Bhanupratap's niece, Priya, falls in love and wants to marry Vikram. It is at this point that the past will re-visit Jageera where he will come face to face with his past wrong actions and the devastation that he has inflicted on his family.

== Cast ==
- Dharmendra as Veerendra "Veeru"
- Rajinikanth as Inspector Vikram Singh
- Jaya Prada as Jyoti / Sitara
- Madhavi as Priya
- Shakti Kapoor as Paltu
- Amrish Puri as Bhanupratap
- Pran as Jagira
- Bindu as Chand Bai
- Gulshan Grover as Baggad
- Rohini Hattangadi as Laxmi
- Sarla Yeolekar as Parvati "Paro"
- Vikas Anand as Parvati's Brother
- Bob Christo as Bob
- Jack Gaud as Lal Singh

== Music ==
1. "Insaaf Kaun Karega" - Mohammed Aziz
2. "Tujhe Dekhe Bina Dil Nahi Mane" - Shabbir Kumar, Kavita Krishnamurthy
3. "Hathkadiyaan Pehnoongi" - Kavita Krishnamurthy
4. "Ikrar Kare Kis Se" - Anuradha Paudwal
5. "Mujre Ki Shaam Aakhri" - Anuradha Paudwal
