= Rajinikanth =

Indian actor (born 1950)

- Rajinikanth in 2018
- Born: Shivaji Rao Gaikwad; 12 December 1950 (age 75); Bangalore, Mysore State, India
- Education: Adyar Film Institute
- Occupations: Actor; film producer; screenwriter; playback singer
- Years active: 1975–present
- Works: Full list
- Spouse: Latha Rajinikanth (m. 1981)
- Children: Aishwarya; Soundarya
- Relatives: See Rajinikanth family
- Awards: Dadasaheb Phalke Award (2019); NTR National Award (2016); Kalaimamani (1984) (See full list)
- Honours: Padma Vibhushan (2016); Padma Bhushan (2000)

Shivaji Rao Gaikwad (Note: There are numerous variant spellings of the name. These include Gaikwad, Gaykwad, Gaikawad, and Gaykawad.) (born 12 December 1950), known professionally as Rajinikanth, (Note: There are numerous variant spellings of the name. These include Rajanikant, Rajni Kanth, Rajanikanth and Rajanikant.) is an Indian actor who predominantly works in Tamil cinema. In a career spanning over five decades, he has appeared in 170 films, including films in Tamil, Hindi, Telugu, Kannada, Bengali, and Malayalam. He is widely regarded as one of the most successful and popular actors in the history of Indian cinema. The Government of India honoured him with the Padma Bhushan in 2000 and the Padma Vibhushan in 2016, India's third- and second-highest civilian honours, respectively, the Dadasaheb Phalke Award in 2019, the highest Indian award in the field of cinema, and the IFFI Satyajit Ray Lifetime Achievement Award for his contributions to world cinema.

Following his debut in K. Balachander's 1975 Tamil drama Apoorva Raagangal, Rajinikanth's acting career commenced with a brief phase of portraying antagonistic characters in Tamil films. His major positive role as a scorned lover in S. P. Muthuraman's Bhuvana Oru Kelvi Kuri (1977), together with his roles in 1978's Mullum Malarum and Aval Appadithan, earned him critical acclaim; the former earned him a Tamil Nadu State Film Award Special Prize for Best Actor. By the end of the decade, he had worked in all South Indian film industries and established a career in Tamil cinema. He then played dual roles in the action thriller Billa (1980), a remake of the Hindi film Don (1978). It was his biggest commercial success to that point, earning him stardom and giving him an action hero image. He starred in a triple role in Moondru Mugam (1982), which earned him a special prize at the Tamil Nadu State Film Awards ceremony. The following year, he made his Hindi film debut with T. Rama Rao's top-grossing Andhaa Kaanoon (1983). Nallavanukku Nallavan (1984) won him that year's Filmfare Award for Best Tamil Actor. In the latter half of the 1980s, he starred in several successful films in Tamil and Hindi, including Geraftaar (1985), Padikkadavan (1985), Mr. Bharath (1986), Velaikaran (1987), Manithan (1987), Dharmathin Thalaivan (1988), Mappillai (1989) and ChaalBaaz (1989).

In 1991, Mani Ratnam's Tamil crime film Thalapathi earned Rajinikanth major critical acclaim for his performance. He collaborated with Suresh Krissna for many films including Annaamalai (1992) and Baashha (1995); the latter was the biggest commercial success in his career yet as well as the highest-grossing film in Tamil for many years. His other successes include P. Vasu's Mannan (1992), Uzhaippali (1993) and K. S. Ravikumar's Muthu (1995) and Padayappa (1999); the latter went on to become his and Tamil cinema's highest-grossing movie, exceeding Baashha.

After a hiatus of a few years, Rajinikanth returned to acting with the comedy horror film Chandramukhi (2005); it went on to become the highest-grossing Tamil film of all time. His next film, S. Shankar's Sivaji (2007), was the third Indian film and the first-ever Tamil film to enter the 100 Crore Club. He then played dual roles as a scientist and an andro-humanoid robot in the science fiction film Enthiran (2010) and its sequel 2.0 (2018), both of which were India's most expensive productions at the time of their release. (Note: The film grossed ₹2.89 billion (equivalent to ₹4.5 billion or US$48 million in 2026) worldwide, surpassing Sivaji's collection of ₹1.55 billion (equivalent to ₹2.4 billion or US$26 million in 2026). As of June 2012, it remains the highest-grossing Tamil film, till the release of Thuppakki.) His action films 2.0, Jailer (2023), Coolie (2025), and Jailer 2 (2026) became major commercial successes in Tamil cinema, making him the only actor in the industry with four films surpassing the ₹500 crore mark. His film, Jailer 2, shattered box office records by crossing 700 crores worldwide, topping 2.0 to become the highest-grossing Tamil film of all time. This also marks his second film to cross the 700-crore mark.

Known for his unique mannerisms and one-liners in films, he has a huge fan base and a cult following. He has won numerous film awards, including the National Film Award, eight Tamil Nadu State Film Awards, a Nandi Award, a Filmfare Award and two Maharashtra State Film Awards. Rajinikanth was named one of the most influential persons in South Asia by Asiaweek. He was also named by Forbes India as the most influential Indian of the year 2010.

== Early life and background ==
Rajinikanth was born Shivaji Rao Gaikwad on 12 December 1950 in a Marathi family in Bangalore, Mysore State (present-day Karnataka). His mother was a homemaker, (Note: While Naman Ramachandran's 2012 biography of Rajinikanth identifies his mother's name as Ramabai, journalist Ramachandra Rao, a childhood friend of the actor, said in 2012 that her name was Jijabai.) and his father, Ramoji Rao Gaekwad, was a police constable. His ancestors hailed from Mavadi Kadepathar, Pune district, Maharashtra. He is the youngest of four children in a family consisting of two elder brothers (Satyanarayana Rao and Nageshwara Rao) and a sister (Aswath Balubhai). After his father's retirement from work in 1956, the family moved to the suburb of Hanumantha Nagar in Bangalore and built a house there. He lost his mother at the age of nine.

Rajinikanth had his primary education at the Gavipuram Government Kannada Model Primary School in Bangalore. As a child, he was "studious and mischievous" with a great interest in cricket, football and basketball. During this time, his brother enrolled him at the Ramakrishna Math, a Hindu monastery set up by the Ramakrishna Mission. In the math, he was taught the Vedas, tradition and history, which eventually instilled a sense of spirituality in him. In addition to spiritual lessons, he also began acting in plays at the math. His aspiration towards theatre grew at the math, and he was once given an opportunity to enact the role of Ekalavya's friend from the Hindu epic Mahabharata. His performance in the play received praise from the Kannada poet D. R. Bendre. After sixth grade, Rajinikanth was enrolled at the Acharya Pathasala Public School and studied there until he completed his pre-university course. During his schooling at the Acharya Pathasala, he spent a lot of time acting in plays.

Upon completion of his school education, Rajinikanth held several jobs, including that of a coolie before getting a job in the Bangalore Transport Service as a bus conductor. He continued to take part in plays after the Kannada playwright Topi Muniappa offered him a chance to act in one of his mythological plays. He decided to take up an acting course in the newly formed Madras Film Institute after coming across an advertisement. Although his family was not fully supportive of his decision to join the institute, his friend and co-worker, Raj Bahadur, motivated him to join the institute and financially supported him during this phase. During his stay at the institute, he was noticed by the Tamil film director K. Balachander. Balachander provided Rajinikanth with his stage name to avoid confusion with fellow actor Sivaji Ganesan, having taken it from a character's name in his earlier film Gauravam. Balachander advised him to learn to speak Tamil, a recommendation that Rajinikanth quickly followed. Although he can read the language, he cannot write in it.

== Acting career ==
=== 1975–1977: Early career ===
"Rajinikanth claims that I am his school. But I must admit that this wasn't the Rajinikanth I introduced. He has evolved on his own merits and strengths. I gave him an opportunity and unveiled him to the world. He went and conquered it."

— K. Balachander about Rajinikanth

Rajinikanth began his film career with the Tamil film Apoorva Raagangal (1975), directed by K. Balachander. He was cast in a small role as the ex-husband of the female lead played by Srividya. The film explored relationships between people with wide age differences and was deemed controversial upon release. However, it received critical acclaim and won three National Film Awards including the Award for the Best Tamil Feature at the 23rd National Film Awards in 1976. A review from The Hindu noted that "Newcomer Rajinikanth is dignified and impressive." His next release was Puttanna Kanagal's Kannada anthology film Katha Sangama (1976). Rajinikanth appeared in the last segment of the film; he played the role of a village ruffian who rapes a blind woman in the absence of her husband. Balachander cast him in a pivotal role in Anthuleni Katha (1976), the Telugu remake of his own Tamil film Aval Oru Thodar Kathai (1974). In Moondru Mudichu—the first Tamil film to feature him in a prominent role—he played a character that "blithely row[s] away" when his friend drowns accidentally in the lake only to fulfill his desire to marry the former's girlfriend. His style of flipping the cigarette in the film made him popular among the audience. In his final release of the year, Baalu Jenu, he was cast as the main antagonist who troubles the female lead. He played similar roles in Balachander's Avargal (1977), and Bharathiraja's 16 Vayadhinile (1977). The same year, he made his first-ever appearance as a lead actor in the Telugu film Chilakamma Cheppindi (1977), which earned him his only nomination for the Filmfare Award for Best Actor – Telugu. S. P. Muthuraman experimented with casting Rajinikanth in a positive role in Bhuvana Oru Kelvi Kuri (1977). The success of the film brought the duo together for 24 more films until the 1990s. Rajinikanth played supporting and "villainous" roles in most of the films released during the year. In Gaayathri, he was cast as a pornographer who secretly films his relationship with his wife without her knowledge and in Galate Samsara, he played the role of a married man who develops an affair with a cabaret dancer. Fifteen of his films were released during the year.

=== 1978–1989: Experimentation and breakthrough ===
In 1978, Rajinikanth had 20 releases across Tamil, Telugu and Kannada. His first film of the year was P. Madhavan's Shankar Salim Simon, in which he was among the three leads. Following that, he co-starred alongside Vishnuvardhan in the Kannada film Kiladi Kittu. He played the second lead in Annadammula Savaal, which starred Krishna; Rajinikanth reprised his role from the Kannada original. He then played an important role in the supernatural thriller Aayiram Jenmangal. In Maathu Tappada Maga, he was the main antagonist. Bairavi, directed by M. Bhaskar, was the first Tamil film to cast Rajinikanth as a solo hero. It was for this film that he earned the sobriquet "Superstar". S. Thanu, one of the film's distributors, set up a 35 feet (11 m) high cut-out of Rajinikanth. His next appearance, Ilamai Oonjal Aadukirathu, a quadrangular love story written and directed by C. V. Sridhar, saw him play the role of a man who sacrifices his love for his friend, played by Kamal Haasan. The film's success prompted Sridhar to remake the film in Telugu, Vayasu Pilichindi, which retained the original cast of the Tamil film.

His next film, Vanakkatukuriya Kathaliye, had an introductory song to mark his entry, a trend that would soon become a feature of his later films. Mullum Malarum, released during the same period, received critical acclaim and earned him his first Filmfare Award for Best Actor – Tamil nomination. The film marked the directorial debut of Mahendran, with a screenplay adapted from a novel of the same name published in Kalki. It won the Filmfare Award for Best Tamil Film and a Special Prize (Best Actor) for Rajinikanth at the Tamil Nadu State Film Awards. Following this, he made a foray into Malayalam cinema with I. V. Sasi's fantasy film Allauddinum Albhutha Vilakkum, which was based on a story from the Arabian Nights. The same year, he acted in Dharma Yuddam, in which he played a mentally ill person avenging the death of his parents. He then co-starred with N. T. Rama Rao in Tiger. Upon completion of Tiger, Rajinikanth had acted in 50 films over a period of four years, and in four languages. Some other popular films released during this period were the youthful entertainer Ninaithale Inikkum, the Tamil–Kannada bilingual Priya, the Telugu film Amma Evarikkaina Amma and the melodrama Aarilirunthu Arubathu Varai. Priya, based on a detective novel by Sujatha, had the distinction of being the first Rajinikanth film to be shot mostly outside India, mainly in Southeast Asia. Aarilirunthu Arubathu Varai earned him his second nomination for the Filmfare Award for Best Actor – Tamil.

Rajinikanth, who credited Hindi film star Amitabh Bachchan as his inspiration, began playing Amitabh Bachchan's roles in Tamil remakes of his films. This began with Shankar Salim Simon (1978), a remake of Amar Akbar Anthony (1977), followed by Naan Vazhavaippen (1979), a remake of Majboor (1974). He was subsequently cast in a series of roles modelled after Amitabh Bachchan in Tamil remakes of his films. Rajinikanth starred in eleven Tamil remakes of Amitabh Bachchan films, as well as a Telugu remake of Amar Akbar Anthony, Ram Robert Rahim (1980), alongside Sridevi. The most successful of these were remakes of Salim–Javed films, such as Billa (1980), Thee (1981) and Mr. Bharath (1986). He would ultimately be known as the "angry young man" of Tamil cinema.

During this phase of his career, Rajinikanth abruptly chose to quit acting, but was coaxed to return with the Tamil film Billa (1980), a remake of the Bollywood blockbuster Don (1978), written by Salim-Javed and starring Amitabh Bachchan. Billa had Rajinikanth playing dual roles and eventually became his first solo commercial success. His pairing with Sridevi continued in Johnny, in which he was once again cast in a double role, earning him his third nomination for the Filmfare Award for Best Actor – Tamil. He also starred in Murattu Kaalai which was a commercial success. The success of Billa was a turning point in Rajinikanth's career, disproving detractors who claimed Rajinikanth was "finished" and which saw him accepted as a full-fledged hero. The success of Billa established Rajinikanth as one of the top stars of Tamil cinema.

In 1981, he appeared in Garjanai, which was shot simultaneously in Kannada and Malayalam, making it his last film in those two languages up until 2023. In K. Balachander's first home production, Netrikan, he played dual roles as a womanising father and a responsible son. His first full-length comedy was Thillu Mullu, directed by K. Balachander. He agreed to it solely due to the strong suggestion by his mentor that he should do non-commercial roles, to break the stereotyped action-hero mould by which he was getting famous at the time. Thillu Mullu earned him his fourth nomination for the Filmfare Award for Best Actor – Tamil. 1981 also saw the release of Thee, a remake of the blockbuster Hindi film Deewaar (1975), also originally written by Salim-Javed and starring Amitabh Bachchan; in Thee, Rajinikanth reprised Bachchan's role. In 1982, he starred in Pokkiri Raja, Moondru Mugam, Thanikattu Raja, Pudukavithai and Enkeyo Ketta Kural. Moondru Mugam, which featured Rajinikanth playing three different roles for the first time, earned him his fifth nomination for the Filmfare Award for Best Actor – Tamil.

By 1983, he was a popular actor across South Indian cinema, including Telugu and Kannada films. In 1983, Rajinikanth starred in his first Bollywood film, Andhaa Kaanoon, alongside Hema Malini, Reena Roy and Amitabh Bachchan (in an extended cameo appearance). The film opened to an excellent response from the audience and emerged as a blockbuster at the box office. In 1984, he appeared in Naan Mahaan Alla, a remake of Subhash Ghai's directorial venture Vishwanath. The film proved to be a superhit. That same year, he played a small role in Anbulla Rajinikanth and delivered three more successful Hindi films, Meri Adalat, Gangvaa and John Jani Janardhan (in which he played a triple role). His performance in Nallavanuku Nallavan earned him his first and only Filmfare Award for Best Actor – Tamil. In his 100th film, Sri Raghavendra (1985), he played the Hindu saint Raghavendra Swami.

In the second half of the 1980s, Rajinikanth acted in commercially successful films, such as Naan Sigappu Manithan (1985), Geraftaar (1985), Padikkathavan (1985), Mr. Bharath (1986), Dosti Dushmani (1986), Velaikaran (1987), Manithan (1987), Insaaf Kaun Karega (1987), Guru Sishyan (1988) and Dharmathin Thalaivan (1988), with Velaikaran earning him his seventh nomination for the Filmfare Award for Best Actor – Tamil. In 1988, he made his only American film appearance in Bloodstone, directed by Dwight Little, in which he played an English-speaking Indian taxi driver. Rajinikanth finished the decade with films including Rajadhi Raja, Siva, Raja Chinna Roja and Mappillai while also starring in a few Bollywood productions. Raja Chinna Roja was the first Indian film to feature live action and animation.

=== 1990–2010: Commercial peak ===
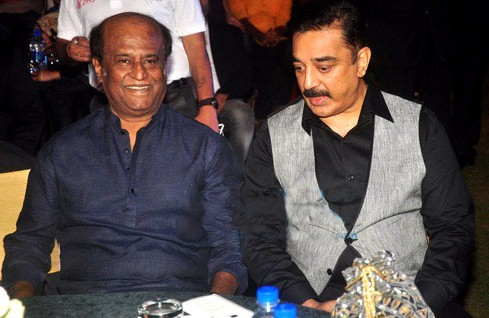
Rajinikanth with Kamal Haasan

Rajinikanth began the new decade with a mega blockbuster in Panakkaran (1990), which was a remake of Amitabh Bachchan's 1981 film Laawaris. The film earned him his eighth nomination for the Filmfare Award for Best Actor – Tamil. His next two Tamil films, the fantasy comedy Athisaya Piravi (a remake of Chiranjeevi's 1988 film Yamudiki Mogudu), which was also released in 1990, and the family drama Dharmadorai (1991), did above-average business at the box office. His stint in Bollywood, which began in the previous decade, continued as he starred in more Hindi films. Hum, released in 1991, featured him as the second lead alongside Amitabh Bachchan and became an inspiration for Baashha. In 1991, he worked with Mani Ratnam in Thalapathi, which was heavily inspired by the Mahabharata. He co-starred with actor Mammooty in the film, which dealt with the friendship between two unknown characters based on Karna and Duryodhana, respectively, and was set in a more contemporary milieu and was both critically acclaimed and successful upon release. He received his ninth nomination for the Filmfare Award for Best Actor – Tamil for the film. He went on to appear in remakes of films from other languages, mostly from Hindi and Telugu. Annaamalai, which released in 1992, was yet another friendship-centric film and was loosely based on the 1987 Bollywood film Khudgarz. The film was the first to have the Superstar graphic title card. He received his tenth nomination for the Filmfare Award for Best Actor – Tamil for the film. Mannan, directed by P. Vasu, a remake of Kannada actor Rajkumar's 1986 blockbuster Anuraga Aralithu, was also released in 1992 and became a box office success. Rajinikanth wrote his first screenplay for the film Valli (1993), in which he also made a special appearance. He also starred in the film Yajaman, in which he played the role of Vaanavaraayan, a village chieftain. His romantic-comedy Veera (1994) was controversial for its climax but went on to become one of the highest-grossing films in 1994. That year, he earned his eleventh nomination for the Filmfare Award for Best Actor – Tamil for the action-drama Uzhaippali.

He joined hands with Suresh Krishna for Baashha (1995), which emerged as an industry hit, and is routinely touted by fans as the film which elevated him from a star to demigod status among the masses. He made a cameo in Peddarayudu for his friend Mohan Babu and also helped him obtain the remake rights. The same year, he acted in yet another gangster film, Aatank Hi Aatank with Aamir Khan which was also his last Hindi film in a major role to date. His film Muthu, a remake of Mohanlal's blockbuster Malayalam film Thenmavin Kombathu, was another commercial success, directed by K. S. Ravikumar and produced by K. Balachander, and became the first Tamil film to be dubbed into Japanese, as Mutu: Odoru Maharaja. The film grossed a record US$1.6 million in Japan in 1998 and was responsible for creating a large Japanese fanbase for the actor. Muthu's success in Japan led American news magazine Newsweek to comment in a 1999 article that Rajinikanth had "supplanted Leonardo DiCaprio as Japan's trendiest heartthrob". During a visit to Japan in 2006, Indian Prime Minister Manmohan Singh acknowledged the success of Muthu in the country during a speech, justifying the positive relationship between the two nations. He received his twelfth and thirteenth nominations for the Filmfare Award for Best Actor – Tamil for his performances in Baashha and Muthu.

He also entered Bengali cinema through Bhagya Debata, which was released at the end of 1995. 1997's Arunachalam, another commercial success, earned him his fourteenth nomination for the Filmfare Award for Best Actor – Tamil. Rajinikanth released his last film of the millennium with Padayappa (1999), which went on to become a blockbuster success, and earned him his fifteenth nomination for the Filmfare Award for Best Actor – Tamil. It starred Ramya Krishnan and Soundarya, the former receiving critical acclaim for her performance. It was also the last prominent role for veteran Tamil actor Sivaji Ganesan.

After a brief pause, Rajinikanth starred in Baba in 2002, for which he had also written the screenplay. Released with much fanfare and hype at the time, the film featured a story revolving around the reformation of a gangster who is later revealed to be the reincarnation of the Hindu saint Mahavatar Babaji and fights against political corruption. It fell short of market expectations and the high bids reportedly translated to heavy losses for the distributors. Rajinikanth himself repaid the losses incurred by the distributors. The film drew comments such as "the bloom was off the rose" and that "the gold does not glitter any more". Pattali Makkal Katchi (PMK) leader S. Ramadoss condemned him for smoking and posing with beedis in the film. He was criticised for spoiling the Tamil youth by glorifying smoking and drinking. PMK volunteers attacked the theatres that screened the film and seized film reels and burned them.

Two years later, Rajinikanth signed up for P. Vasu's Chandramukhi (2005), a remake of the Malayalam film Manichitrathazhu. Upon release, the film was highly successful at the box office, and in 2007 it set the record of being the longest-running Tamil film. Chandramukhi was also dubbed in Turkish and in German as Der Geisterjäger and released in the respective nations. Following Chandramukhi's release, it was reported that AVM Productions was set to produce a film directed by Shankar starring Rajinikanth – the largest collaboration yet for a Tamil film. The film was titled Sivaji and was released in the summer of 2007, following two years of filming and production. It became the first Tamil film to be ranked among the top ten films at the United Kingdom and South Africa box offices upon release. Rajinikanth received a salary of ₹260 million (equivalent to ₹860 million or US$9.2 million in 2026) for his role in the film, the highest of his career at that time. He received his sixteenth nomination for the Filmfare Award for Best Actor – Tamil for his performance in the film. During the production of Sivaji, Soundarya Rajinikanth announced her intention to produce a computer-generated imagery film starring an animated version of her father titled Sultan: The Warrior. The film was set for release in 2008. However, it entered development hell, and its development status would become unknown over the next few years.

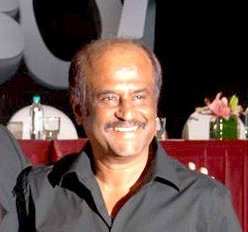
Rajinikanth at the Enthiran (2010) soundtrack release event in Mumbai

He worked with P. Vasu again for Kuselan, a remake of the Malayalam film Kadha Parayumbol, which was made simultaneously in Telugu as Kathanayakudu, in which Rajinikanth played an extended cameo role as Ashok Kumar, a film star in Indian cinema, and as a best friend to the film's protagonist. According to Rajinikanth, the film somewhat narrated his early life. The film, however, performed poorly at the box office and led to many distributors incurring major losses. Rajinikanth also stated that he would work with Pyramid Saimira again to compensate for Kuselan.

"Is there anything left to be said about a man who, at 61, still manages to star in one of the most successful films of the year, not just in the south, but across India? Superstar Rajni once again proved that he is the actor with the Midas touch with the sci-fi flick Endhiran, where he played an ambitious scientist, a naive robot and an evil android bent on destroying the world [...] He did it with such aplomb that he's been the talk of the town for months. He might do one film in two years, but when he does, he pulls out all the stops."

— Rediff.com on Rajinikanth's performance in Enthiran (2010)

Rajinikanth worked again with Shankar for the science fiction film Enthiran. The film was released worldwide in 2010 as the most expensive Indian film ever made, ultimately emerging as an all-time blockbuster and the second highest-grossing film in India of its time. Rajinikanth was paid a remuneration of ₹450 million (equivalent to ₹1.1 billion or US$12 million in 2026) for the film. He received his seventeenth nomination for the Filmfare Award for Best Actor – Tamil for his performance in the film. The film's success led the Indian Institute of Management Ahmedabad to use the film as a case study to analyse the business of cinema and its success story in a postgraduate elective management course called Contemporary Film Industry: A Business Perspective. The course would also study Muthu.

=== 2011–present: Career fluctuations and return to success ===
In January 2011, Rajinikanth was slated to appear in Rana, a period film to be produced by Soundarya Rajinikanth and directed by K. S. Ravikumar, who would work with the actor for a third time. During the principal photography of the film on 29 April 2011, he suffered a mild foodborne illness on the sets, which led to vomiting, dehydration, and exhaustion. He was treated at St. Isabel's Hospital for a day before being discharged. Five days later, he was rushed to the same hospital again after suffering from breathlessness and fever. He was diagnosed with bronchitis and was kept at the hospital for a week, while also spending a few days in an intensive care unit. Several conflicting reports of discharge dates arose, as well as claims of Rajinikanth's health deteriorating. Two days after his last discharge, Rajinikanth was admitted to the Sri Ramachandra Medical College and Research Institute on 16 May 2011 for recurring respiratory and gastrointestinal problems. The hospital maintained that Rajinikanth was in stable condition and showed a positive response to treatment. It was widely reported that he required a kidney transplant, which was later denied by Dhanush.

On 21 May 2011, Aishwarya Rajinikanth released a photo of her and Rajinikanth in his hospital ward, both posing with a thumbs-up, responding to fans' negative reaction to news reports. The hospital restricted unauthorised visitors. Rajinikanth's brother, Sathyanarayana Rao Gaekwad, reported that the sudden illness was due to stress from rapid weight loss and changes in diet, as well as alcohol withdrawal and smoking cessation. After addressing fans in a 4-minute digitally recorded voice message to the media, Rajinikanth, on the advice of Amitabh Bachchan, travelled from Chennai to Singapore with his family on 21 May 2011, where he was to undergo further treatment for nephropathy at Mount Elizabeth Hospital. After spending over two weeks at the hospital, he was finally discharged on 15 June 2011 and continued to recuperate in Singapore, before returning to Chennai on 13 July 2011. Despite several failed attempts to restart Rana upon his return, Rajinikanth reprised his Enthiran character, Chitti, in the Bollywood science-fiction film Ra.One (2011) in a guest appearance alongside Shah Rukh Khan and Kareena Kapoor. In November 2011, it was decided that Rana would be shelved in favour of a new project, titled Kochadaiiyaan. The film was a huge failure at the box office. The motion capture film, which was the first of its type in India, was released in 2014 to positive reviews. Kochadaiiyaan and the 3D release of Sivaji in 2012, made Rajinikanth the first Indian actor to have appeared in four different forms of world cinema: black-and-white, colour, 3D and motion capture. Following the completion of Kochadaiiyaan, Rajinikanth began work on Ravikumar's next directorial venture, titled Lingaa. The film was released on 12 December 2014, coinciding with his birthday, and received mixed reviews from critics.

After a two-year absence from the big screen, Rajinikanth's next film was director Pa. Ranjith's crime drama Kabali, produced by S. Thanu. The film was released in July 2016. The film became the highest-grossing Tamil film of the year, grossing over ₹300 crore (equivalent to ₹385 crore or US$41 million in 2026) and became the fifth highest-grossing Tamil film of all time before being surpassed by another of his films 2.0. (Note: Box office gross values of ₹650 crore were reported for Kabali in the first 13 days by several organisations including Financial Express and Indian Express, which were more than double the estimates made by other sources. International Business Times (IBT) and Firstpost criticized these estimates as inflated, explaining the discrepancy as due in part to the addition of "pre-release business" figures, such as music and satellite rights sales of ₹200 crore, being factored into the box office sales totals. Firstpost wrote, "More conservative estimates put Kabali's collections at around Rs 300 crores from worldwide ticket sales." IBT's analysts in August 2016 estimated the film's worldwide gross total of its first 13 days at around ₹350 crore (US$52.09 million). Figures given in December 2016 by Financial Express indicated an estimated domestic gross of ₹215 crore and an overseas gross of ₹262 crore, which total ₹477 crore. A figure of US$77 million given by Forbes in May 2017 converted to approximately ₹493–499 crore. According to International Business Times in October 2017, Kabali's final worldwide gross was around ₹286 crore (US$31 million).) Also, at the Ananda Vikatan Cinema Awards, the film was nominated in five categories, winning in all of them, and also won five awards at the Edison Awards, and received two nominations at the 6th South Indian International Movie Awards. He also received his eighteenth nomination for the Filmfare Award for Best Actor – Tamil for his performance in the film.

In August 2016, it was announced that Rajinikanth and director Ranjith would work together again on a film with Dhanush as the producer, titled Kaala, in which Rajinikanth plays a Dharavi-dwelling gangster who fights against a corporate takeover of the slum. The film was officially released on 7 June 2018 and received positive reviews from critics. In 2018, he also appeared in S. Shankar's 2.0, reprising the roles of Dr. Vaseegaran and Chitti, alongside Akshay Kumar and Amy Jackson. The film was released on 29 November 2018 and was commercially successful at the box office. The film earned over ₹117.34 crore (US$13 million) worldwide on its first day, which was the second-highest ever for an Indian film. The film crossed ₹520 crore (equivalent to ₹759 crore or US$81 million in 2026) in its opening weekend to be the highest-grossing film worldwide for that week. The film also grossed over ₹655.81 crore (US$70 million)–₹800 crore (US$85 million) at the box office and became the highest-grossing Tamil film of the year. By the end of its box office run, 2.0 was the fourth highest-grossing film in India and the seventh highest-grossing Indian film worldwide and remains the highest grossing Tamil film of all time. In 2019, Rajinikanth starred in Karthik Subbaraj's Petta, in which his performance received praise for his return to his vintage stereotypical style of acting. The film grossed over ₹250 crore (US$27 million), becoming the second-highest-grossing Tamil film of 2019. The combined gross earnings of Kaala, 2.0 and Petta by the end of January 2019 were determined to be over ₹1000 crore according to trade analysts. Rajinikanth then worked with AR Murugadoss in the film Darbar, alongside Nayanthara, which was released in 2020. He played the role of a police officer for the first time in 27 years, since his previous film as a police officer was the Tamil film Pandian. In spite of the huge expectations, the film received mixed to negative reviews and flopped at the box office. His 168th film was with director Siva, titled Annaatthe, co-starring Nayanthara and Keerthy Suresh. The film was released on 4 November 2021. The film became a commercial success at the box office by grossing around ₹240 crore (equivalent to ₹294 crore or US$31 million in 2026) beating the collections made by other Tamil films such as Master and Maanaadu.

After a two-year absence from the big screen, his 169th film was Jailer, which was directed by Nelson Dilipkumar. He played a retired jailer in the film and it was released on 10 August 2023. The film received predominantly positive reviews upon its release and achieved tremendous commercial success, grossing over ₹600 crores worldwide. In 2024, he appeared in T. J. Gnanavel's action drama film Vettaiyan and made a guest appearance in his daughter Aishwarya Rajinikanth's sports drama film Lal Salaam. While the latter sank without a trace, Vettaiyan opened to positive critical reception, but underperformed commercially. In 2025, he appeared in Lokesh Kanagaraj's action thriller Coolie which received mixed reviews upon release but ended up grossing over ₹500 crores worldwide. He then reunited with Nelson Dilipkumar to star in Jailer 2, a sequel to his 2023 film Jailer. The sequel released on 15 October 2026 and opened to mostly positive reviews from both critics and audience members alike.

== Political career ==
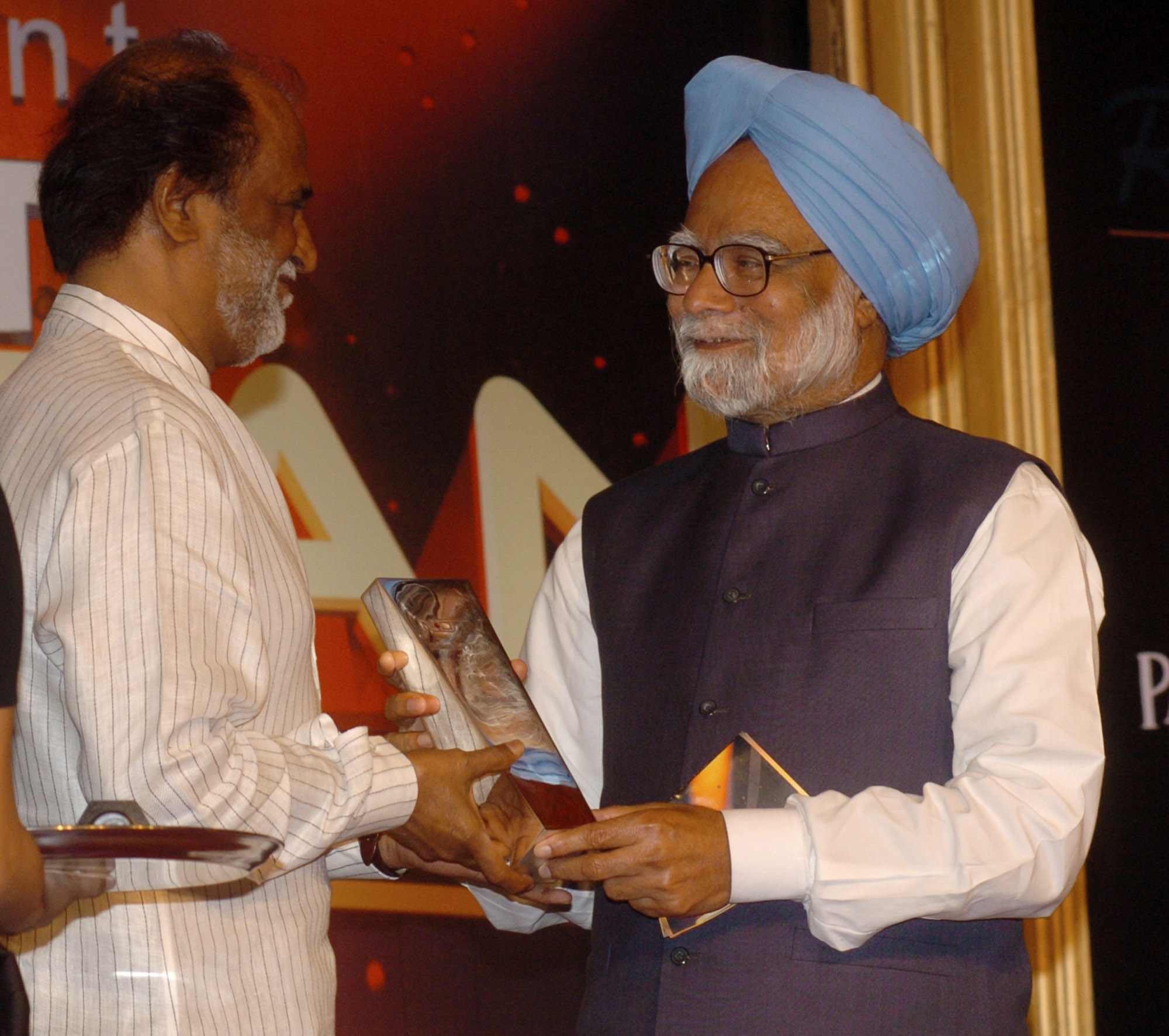
Rajinikanth (left) receiving the 2008 NDTV Entertainer of the Year Award from Prime Minister Manmohan Singh

It was speculated that Rajinikanth would enter politics in 1995. He decided against it and declared that if he entered politics then, it would result in a lot of confusion and that he would not be able to serve the people and fulfil their expectations. However, he added that if Chief Minister J. Jayalalithaa's party returned to power in the 1996 Tamil Nadu Legislative Assembly election, "even God cannot save the people of the State". Rajinikanth went on to wholeheartedly support the Dravida Munnetra Kazhagam (DMK) and Tamil Maanila Congress alliance and asked the people of Tamil Nadu and his fans to vote for that alliance. This alliance had a complete victory in the elections. He also supported the same alliance in the 1996 and 1998 Indian general elections.

Later in 2004, Rajinikanth said he would personally vote for the Bharatiya Janata Party (BJP) but would not extend his support to any front during the upcoming Indian general election. The party, however, failed to win any seats in Tamil Nadu in the Lok Sabha.

Rajinikanth canceled his visit to Sri Lanka in March 2017 at the urging of Tamil Nadu politicians. Leaders of the BJP criticized this choice. In June 2017, BJP leader Subramanian Swamy alleged that Rajinikanth was illiterate and unfit for politics. He also accused Rajinikanth of financial fraud, claiming that he had strong proof of financial irregularities involving Rajinikanth that will bring down Rajinikanth's political aspirations.

However, several political analysts stated that Rajinikanth had missed his chance and that, unlike in 1996, when he was at his peak, it would be very difficult for him to make a significant impact in 2019.

Rajinikanth announced his entry into politics on 31 December 2017 and confirmed his intention to contest in the 2021 Tamil Nadu Legislative Assembly elections in all 234 constituencies. He stated that his party would resign if it was unable to fulfil its electoral promises within three years of coming into power. Rajinikanth dissolved his organisation Rajini Makkal Mandram (RMM) on 12 July 2021 and also said that he has no plans to enter politics in the future.

== Public image ==
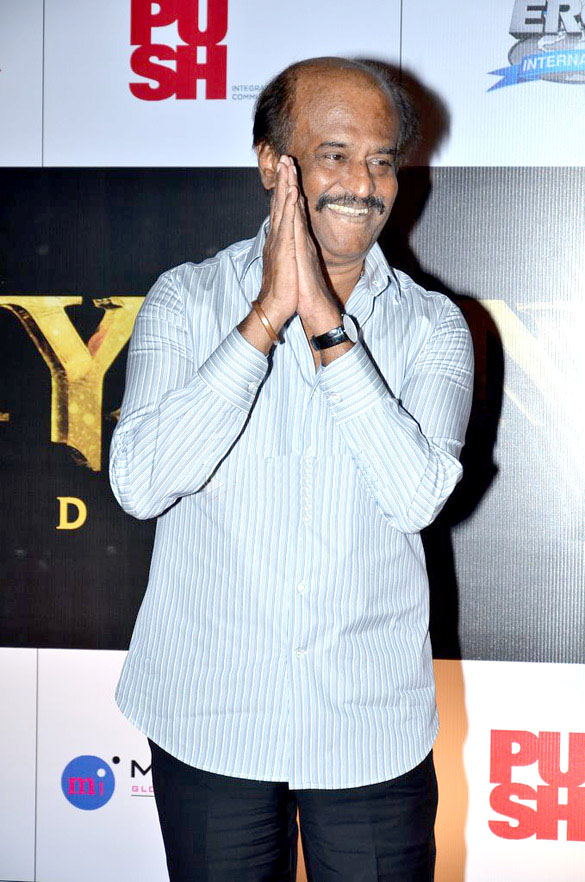
Rajinikanth at premiere of Kochadaiiyaan (2014)

Rajinikanth is widely regarded as one of the most popular actors in the history of Indian cinema. His popularity has been attributed to his distinctively delivered dialogue and eccentricities showcased in his movies, alongside his political pronouncements and charitable work. Many also attribute Rajinikanth's popularity to his larger-than-life superhero appearance in many films, supported by gravity-defying stunts and charismatic expressions, all while attempting to maintain modesty in real life. Almost every Rajinikanth film has punchlines delivered by him in a distinctive style, and these punchlines often have a message or even warn the film's antagonists.

Rajinikanth is one of the highest-grossing actors in Tamil cinema history. After opening his first official Twitter account in 2014, Rajinikanth received over 210,000 followers within 24 hours, a rate that, according to The Economic Times, social media research firms considered the fastest follower growth for any Indian celebrity and among the top ten worldwide. In 2015, a film about his fandom, For the Love of a Man, premiered at the 71st Venice International Film Festival.

== Personal life ==
=== Relationships ===
While he was working as a bus conductor in Bangalore, Rajinikanth met a medical student named Nirmala and started a relationship. After seeing him perform in a stage play, she encouraged him to pursue an acting career and sent an application to the Adyar Film Institute on his behalf without his knowledge. Although he took up the offer and proceeded with his acting career, Rajinikanth has since lost contact with her.

=== Family ===
Rajinikanth married Latha Rangachari, a student of Ethiraj College for Women who interviewed him for her college magazine. The marriage took place on 26 February 1981, in Tirupati, Andhra Pradesh. The couple has two daughters: Aishwarya and Soundarya. He has four grandchildren through his daughters.

=== Views ===
Rajinikanth is a practicing Hindu and is a strong believer in spirituality. He is also a practitioner of yoga and meditation. Rajinikanth has religiously visited major Hindu temples prior to the release of each of his films; for instance, he visited the Tirumala Venkateswara Temple before the release of Sivaji in 2007 and visited Sathya Sai Baba at Prasanthi Nilayam in Andhra Pradesh before the release of Kuselan the following year. He also occasionally goes on pilgrimages to the Himalayas.

He has often referred to Ramakrishna Paramahamsa, Swami Satchidananda, Ragavendra Swami, Mahavatar Babaji, and Ramana Maharshi as his favourite spiritual leaders.

=== Philanthropy ===
According to Naman Ramachandran, the author of Rajinikanth: The Definitive Biography, most of Rajinikanth's philanthropic activities went unpublicised because he chose not to disclose them. In the 1980s, when superstitious beliefs in Tamil Nadu created a stigma towards eye donation, Rajinikanth took up the cause of campaigning in support of corneal transplantation via television and public speeches. In 2011, Rajinikanth announced his support for the anti-corruption movement led by Anna Hazare and offered his commercial wedding venue, the Raghavendra Kalyana Mandapam, in Chennai free of cost for the India Against Corruption members to hold their fast. He also provided lodging in the venue for sanitary workers hired to clean up after the 2015 South India floods. Rajinikanth's fan associations regularly organise blood and eye donation camps and distribute food during his birthday.

=== Controversies ===
==== Money lending allegation ====
Rajinikanth declared ₹6.11 million (equivalent to ₹25 million or US$260,000 in 2026), ₹17 million (equivalent to ₹66 million or US$700,000 in 2026) and ₹3.39 million (equivalent to ₹13 million or US$130,000 in 2026) as earnings for the years 2002–2003, 2003–2004 and 2004–2005, respectively. However, the Income Tax Department observed that he had claimed a considerable sum of professional expenses and thus carried out a survey in 2005 at his residence at Poes Garden. During the survey, the I-T department found that he had accounted for many expenses as professional costs, and it was also discovered that less than one-tenth of the residential property was allocated to professional purposes. Moreover, when Rajinikanth was asked by the I-T department whether he was in the money-lending business, he initially denied it. Later, though, he admitted to the I-T department that he was indeed a money lender, and that he had lent money for profit at an interest rate of 18 percent. Later, for all three years in dispute, Rajinikanth was forced to submit revised returns, admitting that he had earned more than he had reported in the initial report on 14 February 2005. But the I-T department penalised him ₹6.6 million (equivalent to ₹8.5 million or US$91,000 in 2026), because he filed revised returns only after the department surveyed him.

This was challenged by Rajinikanth and his lawyers, and in January 2020 the I-T department wrote off the fine due to its recent decision to withdraw from appeals in cases below ₹10 million (equivalent to ₹13 million or US$140,000 in 2026). The news that Rajinikanth told the Income Tax department that he was lending money at an 18 per cent interest rate has drawn outrage and criticism for his high interest rate loans, which are a major problem in Tamil Nadu.

==== Comments on social issues ====
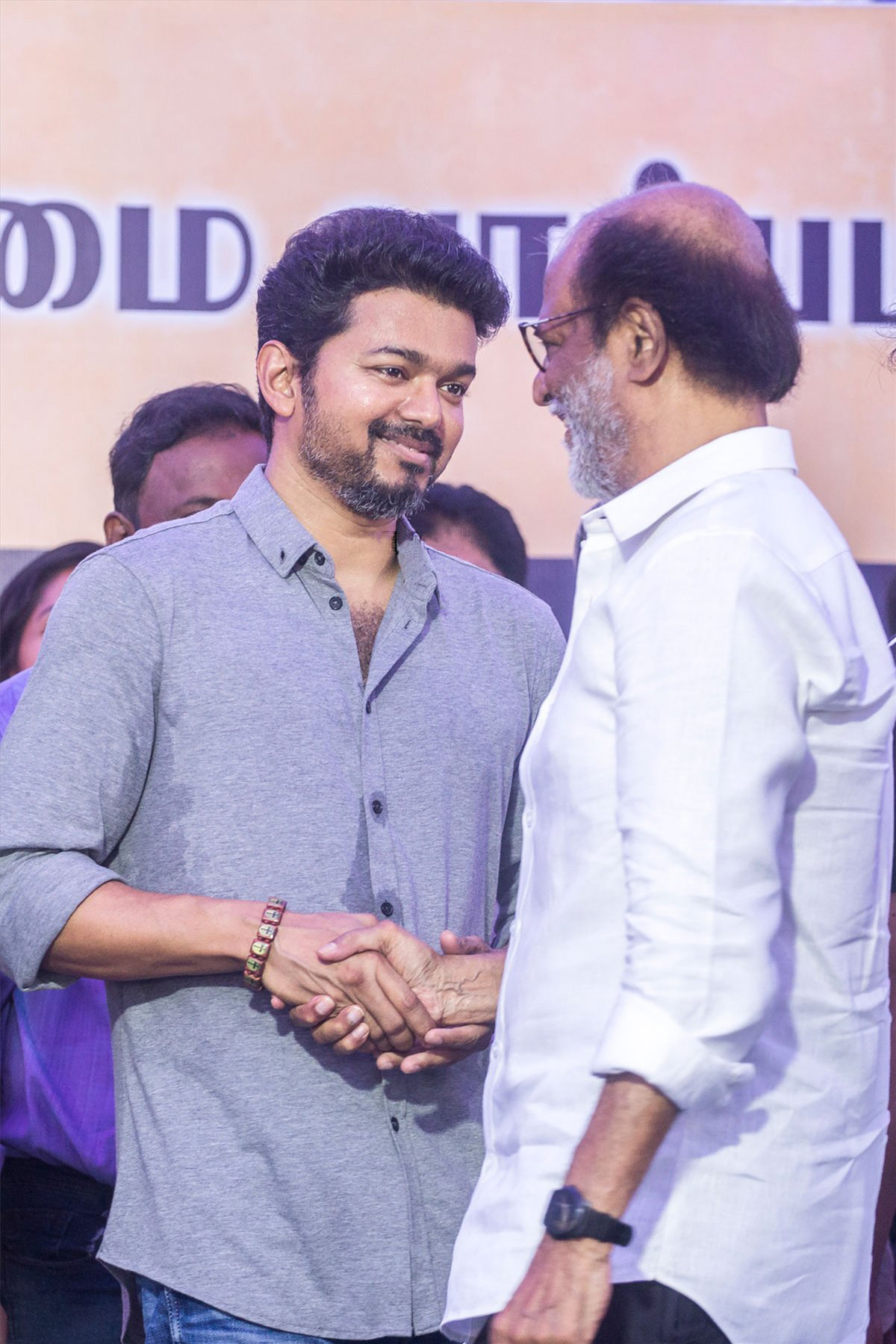
Rajinikanth with Vijay at a Kaveri water sharing protest by the Nadigar Sangam in 2018

In 2002, Rajinikanth undertook a day-long fast to protest the Government of Karnataka's decision not to release Kaveri River water into Tamil Nadu, and announced that he would contribute ₹10 million (US$110,000) toward a plan to interlink Indian rivers. He met with Indian Prime Minister Atal Bihari Vajpayee and many experts to canvass support for the project. His hunger strike was independent of the Nadigar Sangam, which organised its own solidarity protest for the same cause. Film director Bharathi Raja lashed out against Rajinikanth, alleging that he was dividing the film industry and saying that he was a "traitor who had a tacit understanding with the Karnataka government".

In 2008, Rajinikanth took part in a hunger strike organised by the Nadigar Sangam against Karnataka's stance on the Hogenakkal Falls water dispute, during which he gave a speech against politicians in Karnataka. It led to the state announcing a ban on him and his film Kuselan (2008). The ban was lifted after Rajinikanth appeared on TV9 Kannada and issued an apology for his speech. He later thanked the Government of Karnataka for lifting the ban and allowing the film's release in the state. The apology and subsequent gratitude towards Karnataka led to strong reactions from Nadigar Sangam members R. Sarathkumar, Sathyaraj and Radha Ravi, who called the apology a disgrace to Tamils and opined that his speech never provoked the sentiments of the Kannada people. Rajinikanth's support for fellow actor Ajith Kumar, who in 2010 condemned the forceful inclusion of Tamil cinema personae in political affairs, sparked controversy.

In 2020, Rajinikanth quoted a 2017 article from Outlook, which reported that Dravidar Kazhagam founder Periyar E. V. Ramasamy garlanded the idols of Hindu deities Rama and Sita with footwear at an atheist rally in 1971. His remarks were criticised by supporters of Periyar. In response to the backlash, Rajinikanth stated, "I did not speak on something that didn't happen. I've only spoken on what was reported. It was reported in Outlook also. Sorry, I will not apologise." A report on the Thoothukudi police firing criticised Rajinikanth's comment on the incident that the whole anti-Sterlite protest was engineered by "anti-social" elements.

== Filmography ==
Rajinikanth appeared in over 172 films, (Note: Including the film with cameo appearance-Lal Salaam) predominantly in Tamil cinema. He began his film career by playing antagonistic and supporting roles before moving on to lead roles. He has also worked in other Indian film industries such as Hindi, Telugu, Kannada, Malayalam and Bengali. Alongside Indian films, he has also appeared in an English film.

== Awards and recognition ==
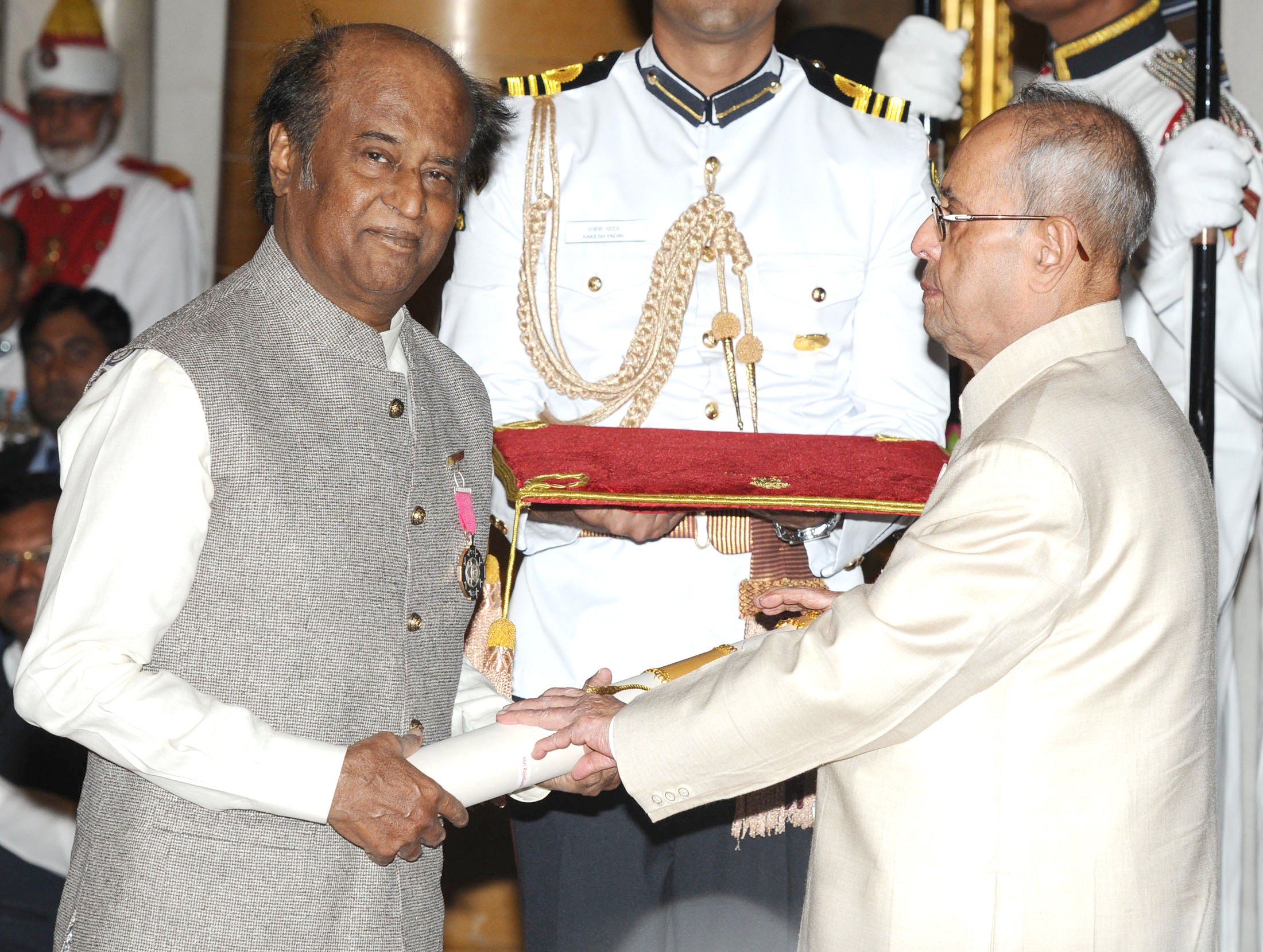
President Pranab Mukherjee presenting the Padma Vibhushan to Rajinikanth at Rashtrapati Bhavan, New Delhi, on 12 April 2016

Rajinikanth has received numerous awards, mostly for his Tamil films. He received his first and only Filmfare Award for Best Tamil Actor in 1984 for Nallavanuku Nallavan. Later, he received Filmfare Award nominations for his performances in Sivaji (2007) and Enthiran (2010). As of 2014, Rajinikanth has received six Tamil Nadu State Film Awards for his performances in various films. He also received numerous awards from Cinema Express and Filmfans' Association for his on-screen performances and off-screen contributions in writing and producing.

Rajinikanth received the Kalaimamani award in 1984 and the M. G. R. Award in 1989, both from the Government of Tamil Nadu. In 1995, the South Indian Film Artistes' Association presented him with the Kalaichelvam Award. He was honoured with the Padma Bhushan (2000) and the Padma Vibhushan (2016) by the Government of India. He was selected as the Indian Entertainer of the Year for 2007 by NDTV, competing against the likes of Shahrukh Khan. The Government of Maharashtra honoured him with the Raj Kapoor Award the same year. He received the Chevalier Sivaji Ganesan Award for Excellence in Indian Cinema at the 4th Vijay Awards. Rajinikanth was also named one of the most influential persons in South Asia by Asiaweek.

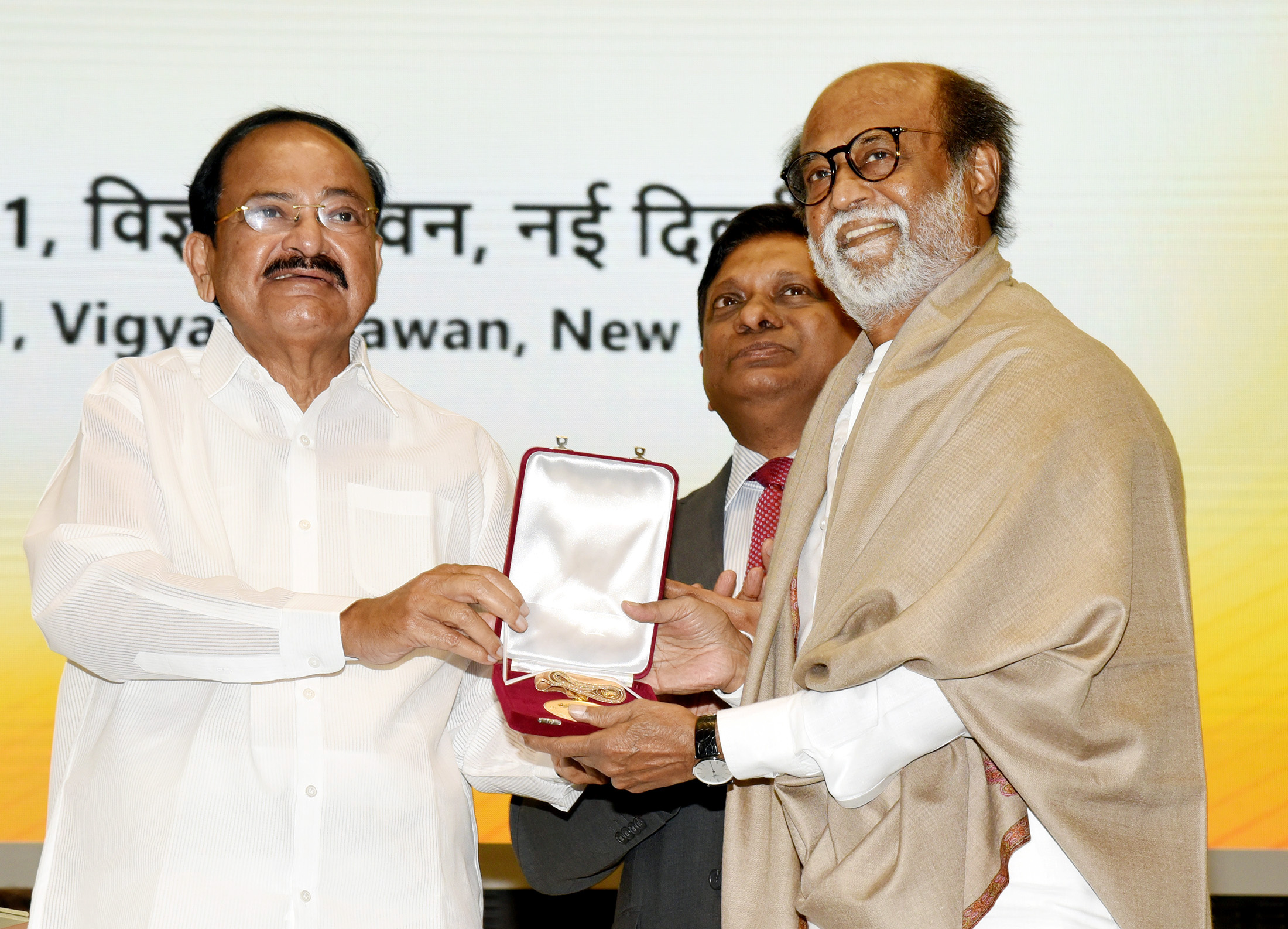
Vice President Venkaiah Naidu presenting the Dadasaheb Phalke Award to Rajinikanth at the 67th National Film Awards, New Delhi, on 25 October 2021

He was named by Forbes India as the most influential Indian of the year 2010. In 2011, he was awarded the Entertainer of the Decade Award by NDTV for the year 2010 by the then Indian Minister for Home Affairs P. Chidambaram. In December 2013, he was honoured by NDTV as one of the "25 Greatest Global Living Legends". In 2014, he was presented with the Indian Film Personality of the Year Award at the 45th IFFI. Rajinikanth received the Dadasaheb Phalke Award at the 67th National Film Awards presentation ceremony at Vigyan Bhawan in New Delhi on Monday, 25 October 2021.

In 2025, Rajinikanth was honoured with the Satyajit Ray Lifetime Achievement Award at the 56th International Film Festival of India.

== Bibliography ==
- Ramachandran, Naman (2012). Rajinikanth: The Definitive Biography. Penguin Books Limited. p. 244. ISBN 978-81-8475-796-5.
- Sreekanth, Gayathri (2008). The Name is Rajinikanth. Om Books International. ISBN 978-81-291-1355-9. Archived from the original on 27 July 2020.
- Ramachandran, Naman (2012). Rajinikanth 12.12.12: A Birthday Special. The Hindu. GGKEY:A78L0XB1B0X. Archived from the original on 8 January 2017.
