= 4th Vijay Awards =

Indian film awards ceremony in 2010

Vijay TV presented the fourth edition of Univercell Vijay Awards powered by Rin, to recognize the excellence of professionals in the Tamil film industry, for movies released in the year 2009. The year 2009 saw 131 films released. Winners from 32 various categories like Best Film, Best Actor Male/Female, Best Supporting Actor Male/Female, Best Comedian, Best Villain, Best Playback Singer Male/Female, Best Debut Actor Male/Female, Best Choreographer, Best Film Editor, Best Lyricist, Best Art Director, Best Dress Designer, Best Dialogue Writer are few of the awards that would be selected by the Jury members.

== Jury members ==
The Jury members for the Fourth Annual Vijay Awards are Director A. R. Murugadoss, Cinematographer Ravi, K. Chandran, Actress Radhika, Film Critic/Cartoonist Madan and Popular Writer/Director/Producer Sam Anderson.

== Honorees ==
The following won awards for the categories they were nominated.

Best Movie – Nadodigal

Best Director of the year – Director Pandiaraj

Best crew of the year – Pasanga

Best Actor – Prakash Raj (Kaanjevaram)

Best Actor Female – Pooja(Naan kadavul)

Best Villain – Rajendran(Naan kadavul)

Best Director – Bala(Naan kadavul)

Best Entertainer – Surya (for Ayan & Aadhavan)

Sivaji Ganesan award- Rajinikanth

Best Supporting actor – Jayaprakash( Pasanga)

Best Supporting actress – Abinaya (Nadodigal)

Best Newcomer Male – Vimal (Pasanga)

Best Newcomer Female – Ananya (Nadodigal)

Best Comedian – Santhanam (SMS)

Best Music Director – Harris Jayaraj (Aadhavan)

Best Story Screenplay – Arivazhagan (Eeram)

Best Cinematographer – Manoj Prahamasa (EerAM)

Best Art Director – Pokkisham

Best Editing – Yavarum Nalam

Best Choreographer -Shobi (Aathichudi)

Best Lyricist- N.A.Muthukumar (Oru kal oru kannadi)

Best Female Singer – Chinmayi (Varayo Varayo)

Best Male Singer – Karthik (Hasili Fisile)

Best Welfare Provider – Surya (Agaram foundation)

Best costume Designer – Anu Vardhan (Sarvam)

Best Makeup Artist – Sasi and Das ( Naan Kadvul)

== Public voting categories ==
Favourite Song of the Year – Oru Chinna Thamarai (Vettaikaran)

Favourite Heroine – Anushka(Vettaikaran)

Favourite Hero – vijay(vettaikaran)

Favourite Film – Ayan

Favourite Director- Samuthirakani(Nadodigal)
