= Mr. Bharath =

1986 film by S. P. Muthuraman

- Theatrical release poster
- Directed by: S. P. Muthuraman
- Screenplay by: Visu
- Based on: Trishul by Salim–Javed
- Produced by: M. Saravanan; M. Balasubramaniam
- Starring: Rajinikanth; Sathyaraj; Ambika
- Cinematography: T. S. Vinayagam
- Edited by: R. Vittal; C. Lancy
- Music by: Ilaiyaraaja
- Production company: AVM Productions
- Release date: 10 January 1986
- Country: India
- Language: Tamil

Mr. Bharath (/ˈbɑːˌrəθ/) is a 1986 Indian Tamil-language masala film directed by S. P. Muthuraman. The film stars Rajinikanth, Sathyaraj, and Ambika. A remake of the 1978 Hindi film Trishul, it revolves around a son's revenge against his father for cheating on his mother. The film was released on 10 January 1986 and was a box office success.

== Plot ==
Bharath is a young, educated man, unaware of his father's whereabouts. Shanti, his mother, tells him about his father on her deathbed.

Flashback: A young Gopinath arrives at Paarapatti village (where the then-young Shanti resides) to engineer a construction project. Over time, he gains Shanti's interest, as she works under his unit as a manual construction laborer. She entrusts him, and he takes the fullest advantage of her. After Gopinath's assigned construction work is completed, he decides to move out of Paarapatti village. Weeks later, Shanti realizes she has conceived. She eagerly and desperately awaits Gopinath's return, expecting him to fulfill his promise. But, she hears from fellow villagers that he was about to marry another rich woman. Shocked, she travels to Madras with the help of the visiting card that Gopinath had given to her earlier to meet him. They both have a furious face-off, after which Gopinath, who not only portrays his original ill-natured mannerisms but also refuses to accept her, highlights the difference in their stature and her archaic nature. He also states that she has no proof regarding intimacy between them that made her conceive, and berates her as a 'gold-digger'. Becoming aware of the innocence as a cloak that he used to exploit her, which he himself admits to at the end, exasperates Shanti furiously. Before departing, an insulted Shanti swears to him that one day her child will question him on the future of his vile actions and make him forcibly confess the truth about his depraved activity in front of the whole society. Over time, Shanti faces hardships yet raises her son to become who he is now by hiding her past until her last hour.

Present day: Shanti takes a promise from Bharath that he will fulfill her challenge before her last breath. Bharath, anguished at having lost his mother, takes up her vow as a challenge to make his biological father confess the truth before 31 August the next year, at his mother's first remembrance.

Bharath leaves for the city and meets his biological father, Gopinath, as a stranger. He does not reveal his identity. After a business deal, Bharath uses a brilliant yet manipulative strategy to extract money from Gopinath, which he invests in starting his own business. He ventures into the construction sector and, within months, rises to become the second-largest company, competing with Gopinath's construction company, 'Gopinath Constructions', which was the number 1 company in the same field. This angers Gopinath, as a result of which, Gopinath views Bharath as a strategic business enemy. Both Bharath and Gopinath try to overtake each other illegitimately. Bharath, however, hardworking and brilliant, outdoes all Gopinath's efforts and, with the help of Sanjeevi, his local trustee, goes on to make his company outrank Gopinath Constructions, becoming the sector's number one company.

Later, Bharath saves a girl from the goons and takes her home, only to realize that she is Pushpa, Gopinath's daughter, and his half-sister. Due to this, Bharath wins the affection of Mrs. Gopinath, who happens to be Bharath's stepmother. Mrs. Gopinath starts to treat him like her own son, Pushpa's brother. Bharath, tactfully, arranges Pushpa's marriage to the son of a wealthy man, Kumaresa Gounder, on 31 August, the first remembrance of his mother. Kumaresa Gounder is aware of Bharath's promise to his mother, so he too helps him fulfill the challenge he has against Gopinath. Bharath also uses the love connection between his rich-born step-brother and austere Sanjeevi's sister to corner the status-minded Gopinath by arranging their marriage on the same day (31 August). Bharath uses every way possible to torture Gopinath and make him realize his mistake, but Gopinath does not reciprocate. He, instead, becomes angrier as things go beyond business vengeance. Bharath sets various bottlenecks for Gopinath to make him realize that he is attacking much more than his business.

Having lost his hold on business, wealth, and status, Gopinath slowly goes bankrupt. He is unable to afford his own children's wedding. Meanwhile, Bharath invites him to inaugurate his orphanage on 31 August, the date when he planned to fulfill his mother's wish. Gopinath, furious with Bharath, who caused his downfall, hires a local goon, Michael, who was once the enemy of both Gopinath and Bharath. Gopinath proposes to kill Bharath at his own inaugural function on the same 31 August.

Mrs. Gopinath inaugurates the statue of Bharath's mother at the function, while Bharath waits for Gopinath to realize his mistake. Upon seeing the statue, Gopinath, in shock, recognizes Shanti and realizes that Bharath is his son. With a change of heart, Gopinath tries to save Bharath from Michael, only to get shot in his own shoulder. Gopinath publicly apologizes and declares that Bharath is his son. The father-son duo thrash Michael and reunite. Kumaresa hands Michael over to the police.

The movie concludes with Gopinath asking Bharath to make him a grandfather by 31 August the next year and lovingly sever his arrogance, sense of entitlement, and money-minded attitude.

== Cast ==
- Rajinikanth as Bharath
- Sathyaraj as Gopinath
- Ambika as Uma
- Sharada as Shanthi
- Goundamani as Sanjeevi
- S. Ve. Shekhar as Ashok
- Raghuvaran as Michael
- Visu as Kumerasa Gounder
- Deepan as Deepak
- Viji as Ponni
- Vadivukkarasi as Lakshmi
- Jothichandra as Pushpa
- Delhi Ganesh as Ramkumar, construction contractor
- LIC Narasimhan as Ravishankar

== Production ==
Sathyaraj acted as Rajinikanth's father in the film though he was in fact four years younger than Rajinikanth. Saravanan cast Raghuvaran after being impressed with his performance in Police... Police. According to Saravanan, the dialogue "Ennamma Kannu" spoken by Sathyaraj was taken from G. Umapathy, a popular film theatre owner who often used this line. The village portions were shot at former minister Mandradiyar's farm house while the song "Ennamma Kannu" was shot at Guindy Race Course, Madras. A fight sequence was shot at Vauhini Studios.

== Music ==
The music was composed by Ilaiyaraaja. The song "Ennamma Kannu" was later remixed by D. Imman for the film Thiruvilaiyaadal Aarambam (2006). The title was also used for a 2000 film also starring Sathyaraj.

Song	Singers	Lyrics	Length
"En Thayin Meethu Aanai"	Malaysia Vasudevan	Vairamuthu	04:31
"Ennamma Kannu"	Malaysia Vasudevan, S. P. Balasubrahmanyam	Vaali	04:36
"Enthan Uyirin"	S. Janaki	Pulamaipithan	04:24
"Kaathirukken"	S. P. Balasubrahmanyam, S. Janaki	Vaali	06:08
"Pacha Molaga Athu"	Malaysia Vasudevan, S. Janaki	Gangai Amaran	04:41

== Release and reception ==
Mr. Bharath was released on 10 January 1986, the week of Pongal. Jayamanmadhan of Kalki appreciated Rajinikanth and Sathyaraj's performances, but criticised that of Ambika. Balumani of Anna praised the acting, music, fights and direction.

== Bibliography ==
- Saravanan, M. (2013) [2005]. AVM 60 Cinema (in Tamil) (3rd ed.). Rajarajan Pathippagam. OCLC 1158347612.
- Muthuraman, S. P. (2017) [2005]. AVM Thandha SPM (in Tamil) (3rd ed.). Vikatan. OCLC 607342391.
