= Geraftaar =

1985 Indian film by Prayag Raaj

- Directed by: Prayag Raaj
- Screenplay by: K. K. Shukla; Kader Khan (dialogue)
- Story by: Prayag Raaj
- Produced by: S. Ramanathan
- Starring: Amitabh Bachchan; Kamal Haasan; Madhavi; Poonam Dhillon
- Cinematography: Anwar Siraj
- Edited by: A. Paul Durai Singham
- Music by: Bappi Lahiri
- Production company: Raam Raj Kalamandir
- Release date: 13 September 1985
- Country: India
- Language: Hindi
- Box office: est. ₹7.5 crore

Geraftaar (transl. Arrest) is a 1985 Indian Hindi-language action drama film directed by Prayag Raaj. The movie produced by S. Ramanathan. It starred Amitabh Bachchan, Kamal Haasan, Madhavi, Poonam Dhillon in lead roles. Rajinikanth played a cameo role as friend of Amitabh Bachchan. The film is one of the highest-grossing movie of the year 1985.

== Plot ==
The film starts off with a happy family consisting of Kapil Kumar Khanna, his wife Durga, and their two sons Karan (Master Ravi) and Kishen. Karan is a very naughty kid and usually angers his parents while at his pranks. Kapil Kumar is an honest inspector and one day, on his wife's request, takes Karan with him. While on duty, Khanna goes to arrest Vidyanath and Ranjit Saxena for possessing illegal drugs. Ranjit and Vidyanath try to kill him by throwing him onto the ground using machinery, when Karan, in an attempt to save his father, pulls the wrong lever and Kapil Khanna is killed. Vidyanath accuses Karan of killing his father, and his mother Durga also in a fit of rage, beats him and tells him to go away. In a wave of emotions, Karan leaves the house and runs towards the ocean. He jumps in and commits suicide. His mother is heartbroken and says she did not want him to leave her and give her such a punishment. Karan has not died, but has been saved by Hussein (Master Suresh) and brings Karan to his home where he finds a new mother (Renu Joshi) and he and Hussein become best friends, giving an example to mankind, which is later shown in this movie.

The starting credits roll on and shows Durga taking Kishen with her to another place where he grows up. On the other hand, Karan and Hussein's childhood are also shown. Now enters a grown up Kishen, a struggling actor who is in love with Lucy (Rabia Amin), a fellow struggling actress whose father uses all her money on drinking. Kishen returns home and enacts a drama in front of his mother, then the two reconcile. When his mother asks him to get married, Kishen refuses, describing the girls of today. Anuradha makes an entrance, speeding in her car. While Lucy crosses the road, Anuradha slams her car into Lucy, leaving her wounded. Kishen runs after her and a chase follows where Kishen takes her to the police station and gets her behind bars. Anuradha is an arrogant girl and calls up her brother, revealed as Ranjit Saxena. The police officer refuses to accept a bribe and locks Anuradha away.

Ranjit asks Vidyanath's brain to think of a way. Vidyanath sends his son Chutkiram to beat Kishen up. Chutkiram has a lisp and has a crush on Anuradha, whom he lovingly calls Anu. A fight ensues between Kishen and Chutkiram and his goons, in which the latter are beaten up by Kishen. Kishen takes him to the police station and explains that he was attacked. Just then Ranjit comes and gives the bail orders for Anu and leaves, saying that Lucy has forgiven Anu for a sum of 25 000 rupees.

Kishen confronts Lucy in hospital and Kishen tells Lucy to keep the money. Just then Lucy's drunkard father comes, takes the money and leaves. Kishen slaps him and tells him to get out Lucy's life. Lucy's father reluctantly leaves, vowing revenge. Anuradha is released from jail and is planning to take revenge on Kishen, and makes a bet with her friend.

Kishen lands a job as a chauffeur and he and his mom are very happy for his job. When he attends his first day at work, he finds out that he is Anuradha's driver, and Anuradha uses this as a means to humiliate Kishen by putting her feet in Kishen's face. He then throws her shoe away and she orders him to bring it. He then throws she shoe in her face and tries to slap him. Kishen then humiliates Anuradha and resigns from the job.

The girls then try to fool Kishen's mother by introducing themselves as social workers and tries to get close to Durga, in which she succeeds. The next day, Kishen and Durga go to a mandir, where they find Anuradha, and she is being very nice to Kishen, but Kishen doesn't fall for it and taunts her. He still hates her, and Anuradha swears in the mandir that she accepts Kishen as her husband and wants to marry him, but still Kishen doesn't fall for her. She then threatens to kill herself and runs away. She is about to jump off a cliff, but Kishen stops her, and professes his love.

A song sequence occurs, and afterwards, Anuradha holds a party in which Kishen publicly professes his love for Anuradha, but Anu then shows her real face and tells him she did this for revenge. Kishen then forcibly takes her to the very same temple where she swore Kishen as her husband. Kishen then marries her. Anu's brother Ranjit, is looking for her and Kishen takes her home, and tells Ranjit that he has just married Anuradha. Ranjit is furious, but he cannot do anything. Kishen leaves saying that he is leaving his wife in Ranjit's care.

Ranjit goes to Vidyanath to help him out. Vidyanath then calls Durga and tells her that Kishen forcibly married Anuradha, and if he does not stay away from her, they will kill him. Durga collapses, and asks for Kishen to forgive her as she really wanted Kishen to marry Anuradha. She is admitted into hospital, and the doctor tells Kishen that she needs to be operated on and he needs to arrange for the money.

Vidyanath calls Lucy, and proposes to produce a play in which she and Kishen play the lead roles. Lucy and Kishen agree and meet Vidyanath, where they rehearse for the play in which Kishen falsely shoots Lucy. While this is all happening, Vidyanath is secretly recording their voices and the gunshot. Vidyanath gives Kishen the money he needs for the surgery and Kishen leaves.

Lucy is practicing her dance, when Chutkiram comes and tries to rape Lucy, and Vidyanath comes and shoots her. He replaces the tape with the recorded voices of Lucy and Kishen. Lucy's father comes and hears the tape playing and steals the tape. Just as he leaves, Kishen comes in and finds Lucy dead. Just then the police arrive and arrest Kishen. In court, they are unable to prove Kishen guilty and he is put in remand. Vidyanath then sends in his jailbirds to kill Kishen. A fight ensues, in which Kishen is losing and is about to be stabbed. Just then a man comes to help Kishen. When Kishen asks who he is, he talks in riddles.

Here Ranjit and Vidyanath are tense as their plan flopped. Anuradha is listening to them talking and has a change of heart and truly accepts Kishen as her husband and declares this to her brother. Ranjit is furious and tries to kill her, but Vidyanath stops him. They let Anuradha go and Vidyanath reveals that they have the tape (they have found Lucy's father), and give this tape to Vidyanath's lawyer, who proves him guilty in court and he is sentenced to death. Vidyanath then kill Lucy's father by throwing him off a high building.

In jail, Kishen plays the song ""'Aana Jaana""', the song he and Karan used to listen to in their childhood. Karan listens to the tune and immediately recognises it. They sing the song throughout the jail and finally find each other at the end of the song. They recognise each other from the fight the other day, and it is revealed that the unknown person is in fact Karan Kumar Khanna, Kishen's lost older brother. Karan though, does not tell him who he is, but tells his story, from his childhood. Kishen finds a familiarity in his story and asks him to continue and he tells his story

Karan seeks blessings from Hussein's mother for his promotion, and his mother asks when he's going to marry, and tells him to go and propose to Geeta. He goes to Geeta, who is a fellow inspector and proposes to her.

The next day, Geeta and Hussein's mother go to a jewellery shop, where robbers come in and take Geeta and Hussein's mother hostage. Karan then takes an entry and beats the robbers, but they run off. Unfortunate for them Inspector Hussein is waiting for them and also beats them up. Both Karan and Hussein take them to jail.

It is revealed, that Ranjit, Vidyanath, Chutkiram and their lawyer are partners in crime and want Karan and Hussein finished. The Police Commissioner's son and Geeta's brother, Vijay is also involved in the crime gang. Karan and Hussein go and threaten to arrest them and to stop being a criminal. Later Vijay complains to his father, Police Commissioner Sinha. The Commissioner warns Hussein and Karan to stay in their limits.

A new case comes to Hussein and Karan and they promise to look into it. It is also Raksha Bandhan and Hussein leaves. Geeta and Hussein follow the ritual of "Rakhi", and then Geeta tries to explain to not abuse their police uniforms. A small fight ensues and Karan is listening. They joke around for a while and Hussein's mother blesses all three of them to live happy lives.

According to the two pathans, they go to the place where they instructed, and arrest Ranjit and Vidyanath, but they get bailed out by their lawyer. They hatch a new plan, and call them to different places. Hussein and Karan fall into their trap, and Hussein is beaten up by Ranjit, and is murdered by Vijay and is burnt alive. Karan reaches too late and Hussein breathes his last in Karan's arms. Karan vows revenge. Karan delivers this bad news to Hussein's mother, and she cannot bear the shock and dies of misery.

Vijay is in hiding, but Karan finds him and burns him alive in the same way he killed Hussein, thus fulfilling his revenge. As he walks out laughing, he is arrested by Geeta and is sentenced to life imprisonment. Here Karan finishes his story to Kishen. At the same time, Durga comes to meet Kishen and Karan recognises her, and without revealing himself, vows to protect Kishen.

The next day Karan helps Kishen escape and is arrested for helping Kishen escape. While humorously explaining the situation, he escapes himself. And while on the run, he unknowingly enters the Commissioner' house. The Commissioner is now handicapped and uses a wheelchair. When the Commissioner is about to shoot him, Karan pleads to let him go, to prove his brother, Kishen innocent. The Commissioner does not believe him, but on Geeta's insistence, he relents.

Durga is informed by her father, that Karan is alive and Durga realises that the one who saved Kishen's life in jail, was in fact his older brother. After fleeing from the Commissioner's place, he returns home after a number of years. Mother and son reconcile and the relation between Karan and Kishen strengthens. The brothers decide to trap Vidyanath and Ranjit in their own trap, using Chutkiram as their pawn. They soon find out that Vijay has not died, but has survived. In a final battle, all the gang members are killed while Chutkiram and Vidyanath are arrested by police. The police commissioner dies because he was killed by Vijay, but Karan kills Vijay and marries Geeta in the end.

== Cast ==
- Amitabh Bachchan as Inspector Karan Kumar Khanna
- Kamal Haasan as Kishan Kumar Khanna
- Rajinikanth as Inspector Hussain (Guest appearance)
- Madhavi as Inspector Geeta Sinha
- Poonam Dhillon as Anuradha Saxena
- Nirupa Roy as Durga Khanna
- Ranjeet as Ranjeet Saxena
- Kader Khan as Vidyanath
- Aruna Irani as Gulabo
- Shakti Kapoor as Chutkiram
- Kulbhushan Kharbanda as Vidyanath's Lawyer (Guest appearance)
- Jeevan as Lucy's Father
- Om Shivpuri as Police Commissioner Sinha
- Satyen Kappu as Inspector Kapil Kumar Khanna (Guest appearance)
- Rabia Amin as Lucy
- Renu Joshi as Hussein's Mother
- Pinchoo Kapoor as Judge
- Sharat Saxena as Vijay Sinha
- Jagdish Raj as Inspector Samant
- Master Ravi as Young Karan
- Manik Irani as Pandit Jagganath Prasad
- Master Suresh as Young Hussein
- Bob Christo as Ram
- Vijayakumar as Shyam
- Tej Sapru
- Shanker Lal
- Pedda Babu
- Swaraj Kumar
- Shyam Kumar
- Rudramoorthy

== Soundtrack ==
Geraftaar

Soundtrack album by Bappi Lahiri
- Released: 1985
- Genre: Feature film soundtrack
- Language: Hindi
- Label: Music India Ltd. (MIL)

Song	Singer
"Dhoop Mein Nikla Na Karo Roop Ki Rani"	Kishore Kumar, Asha Bhosle
"Yaaron Pe Kurbaan Hone Yaar Aaye Hain"	Kishore Kumar, Mohammed Aziz
"Aana Jana Laga Rahega" (Short)	Bappi Lahiri
"Aana Jana Laga Rahega, Dukh Jayega, Sukh Aayega" (Duet)	Bappi Lahiri, Shabbir Kumar
"Khul Jayega Kismat Ka Tala"	Shabbir Kumar
"Soni Kudi Ho, Mastibhari Ho, Kudrat Ki Jadugari Ho"	Mohammed Aziz, Asha Bhosle
