= Dharmathin Thalaivan =

1988 film by SP. Muthuraman

- Theatrical release poster
- Directed by: S. P. Muthuraman
- Screenplay by: Panchu Arunachalam
- Based on: Kasme Vaade by Mirza Brothers
- Produced by: C. Dhandayuthapani
- Starring: Rajinikanth; Prabhu; Suhasini; Khushbu
- Cinematography: T.S. Vinayagam
- Edited by: R. Vittal; S.B. Mohan
- Music by: Ilaiyaraaja
- Production company: Dhandayuthapani Films
- Release date: 24 September 1988
- Running time: 150 minutes
- Country: India
- Language: Tamil

Dharmathin Thalaivan (transl. Righteous Leader) is a 1988 Indian Tamil-language action-drama film directed by S. P. Muthuraman and produced by Dhandayuthapani Films, in their final venture. The film stars Rajinikanth in dual roles, along with Prabhu, Suhasini, Khushbu, Nassar and Captain Raju in other roles. It is a remake of the 1978 Hindi film Kasme Vaade. The film marked the debut of Khushbu in Tamil cinema. It was released on 24 September 1988, and composer Ilaiyaraaja won the Cinema Express Award for Best Music Director.

== Plot ==
Balasubramanian alias Balu is an absent-minded but kind-hearted college professor. He lives with his younger brother Raju, his maternal uncle Rangarajan and his cousin Sumathi, who is also his love interest. Raju, who studies in the same college that Balu works, is short-tempered, rowdyish and a drunkard, spoiled by Balu's and Sumathi's pamperings. He frequently gets into fights with a fellow student Raghupathy, whose father owns the college. Balu fails in several attempts to reform Raju. One night, Balu is accidentally killed when he tries to intervene in one of the fights between Raju and Raghupathy. Before dying, Balu asks Raju to ensure that he can find another person who can marry Sumathi as he does not want her to suffer after his death, to which Raju agrees with a heavy heart. Balu's demise marks a turning point for Raju, who vows never to get angry and drink again. Sumathi, who is devastated at Balu's death, goes into depression, dons the garb of a widow and vows never to marry. To ensure that Sumathi gets over Balu, Raju and Sumathi move to Bangalore, where Raju takes up a job at a garage owned by Devi.

One day, Raju encounters his brother's doppelgänger Shankar, a rowdy and thief who steals cars daily from the garage. Raju, who still feels guilty over his brother's death, is unable to fight Shankar as he looks like his brother and unsuccessfully tries to develop a bond with him. However, after hearing Raju's and Sumathi's sad story, Shankar undergoes a change of heart and he decides to mend his ways, eventually becoming a police informer. Soon, he falls in love with Sumathi, but Sumathi rebuffs him as she is unable to forget Balu. Meanwhile, Sumathi is kidnapped by a smuggler Bhaskar, for whom Shankar once used to work, in order to force him to smuggle diamonds. Shankar reluctantly agrees to Bhaskar's demand so that Sumathi would be saved, but when Bhaskar refuses to release Sumathi, a fight ensues between Shankar and Raju on one side and Bhaskar on the other side, which ends with Bhaskar's arrest. Sumathi realises her love for Shankar, and the movie ends with the marriages of both Shankar and Sumathi as well as Raju and Devi, with Shankar dressing up like the late Balu for the marriage.

== Cast ==
- Rajinikanth as Professor Balasubramanian (Balu) and Shankar
- Prabhu as Raju
- Suhasini as Sumathi
- Khushbu as Devi
- Nassar as Raghupathy
- Captain Raju as Bhaskar
- V. K. Ramasamy as Rangarajan
- Charle as Mani, Shankar's friend (allakkai)
- V. Gopalakrishnan as Devaraj
- M. R. Krishnamurthy as Mohanram
- Kavithalayaa Krishnan as workshop worker
- Disco Shanti (special appearance in "Othadi Othadi" song)

== Production ==
After Thai Veedu, Devar Films parted ways with Rajinikanth. All the subsequent films they produced were flops which resulted in heavy losses. Director R. Thyagarajan openly accepted that they had a very good rapport with Rajinikanth for sometime but due to unavoidable circumstances they lost their friendship with Rajinikanth. They accepted that they are responsible for the issue and there was no mistake on Rajinikanth's side. Rajinikanth wished to help them and did Dharmathin Thalaivan under the subsidiary Dhandayuthapani Films. The film, a remake of the 1978 Hindi film Kasme Vaade, was the 21st collaboration between Rajinikanth and S. P. Muthuraman. The film was launched at the office of Devar Films. It saw Prabhu and Rajinikanth pairing for the first time, although it released after their second outing together, Guru Sishyan (1988). The film marked the debut of actress Khushbu in Tamil films. She revealed that the film happened after she met Prabhu and he recommended her to Dhandayuthapani. She also recalled an instance when she struggled to learn and understand Tamil during the shoot.

== Soundtrack ==
The music was composed by Ilaiyaraaja. The song "Muthamizh Kaviye" is set in Gourimanohari raga.

Track listing
| No. | Title | Lyrics | Singer(s) | Length |
|---|---|---|---|---|
| 1. | "Muthamizh Kaviyae" | Panchu Arunachalam | K. S. Chithra, K. J. Yesudas | 04:34 |
| 2. | "Othadi Othadi" | Vaali | Malaysia Vasudevan, Sunanda | 05:45 |
| 3. | "Thenmadurai Vaigai Nadhi" | Vaali | S. P. Balasubrahmanyam, P. Susheela, Malaysia Vasudevan | 05:10 |
| 4. | "Thenmadurai Vaigai" (Sad) | Vaali | Malaysia Vasudevan, P. Susheela | 04:10 |
| 5. | "Yaaru Yaaru Indha Kizhavan" | Vaali | Mano, Malaysia Vasudevan | 07:04 |
| 6. | "Velli Mani Kinnathiley" | Gangai Amaran | Mano, K. S. Chithra, Malaysia Vasudevan | 04:34 |
| Total length: | | | | 35:57 |

== Release and reception ==
Dharmathin Thalaivan was released on 24 September 1988. The film became a commercial success and paid off all the losses of Devar. However it became the final production of Devar Films and after that they left the industry. Ilaiyaraaja won the Cinema Express Award for Best Music Director.

== Legacy ==
The first look poster of Ghajinikanth (2018) had its lead character in an ethnic attire resembling Balu portrayed by Rajinikanth from Dharmathin Thalaivan. The film was titled Ghajinikanth, because of the forgetful nature of its lead character, besides being a portmanteau of Rajinikanth and Ghajini (2005), which also revolves around a forgetful character.

== Bibliography ==
- Ramachandran, Naman, ed. (2012). Rajinikanth 12.12.12: A Birthday Special. Kasturi & Sons Ltd.
- Ramachandran, Naman (2014) [2012]. Rajinikanth: The Definitive Biography. New Delhi: Penguin Books. ISBN 978-0-14-342111-5.
