= Chilakamma Cheppindi =

1977 Indian Telugu-language film

- Poster
- Directed by: Eranki Sharma
- Written by: Pamman
- Produced by: Chalasani Gopi
- Starring: Sangeeta; Sripriya; Rajinikanth; Lakshmikanth
- Cinematography: B.S. Loknath; R. Raghunatha Reddy
- Music by: M. S. Viswanathan
- Release date: 13 August 1977
- Running time: 155 minutes
- Country: India
- Language: Telugu

Chilakamma Cheppindi (transl. "What the parrot said") is a 1977 Indian Telugu-language drama film, written and directed by Eranki Sharma. The film stars Sangeeta, Sripriya, Rajinikanth (in his first lead role) and Lakshmikanth. The film won the state Nandi Award for Best Feature Film. It was a remake of the 1969 Malayalam film Adimakal. The film premiered at the 1978 International Film Festival of India.

== Plot ==
Ravi, an executive, arrives in a small town in Andhra Pradesh on a temporary assignment. His friend Madhu helps him find accommodation opposite his own house. Ravi is a cocksure character who immediately rubs Madhu's sister Bharati, a dance teacher, the wrong way with his brash behaviour. Bharati hates men because of a past incident. Malli is the domestic help in Madhu's house. Madhu seduces and impregnates her, but denies paternity. In parallel, Ravi tries to tame the shrewish Bharati. Eventually, Malli's problems are all solved with Ravi's help and Bharati too responds to his advances.

== Cast ==
- Sangeetha as Bharati
- Sripriya as Malli
- Narayana Rao as Kasi
- Rajinikanth as Ravi
- Lakshmikanth as Madhu
- P. L. Narayana as Madanagopal
- Hema Sundar as Kanakayya

== Soundtrack ==
- "Chitti Chitti Chepallara Selayeti Papallara Chialakamma Cheppindoyi Challanimata" (P. Susheela)
- "Enduku Neekee Daaparikamu Ennallu Daastavu Daagani Nijamu" (S. P. Balasubrahmanyam, Vani Jairam)
- "Kurradanukoni Kunukuluteese Verridanikee Pilupu" (S. P. Balasubrahmanyam)
