= Velaikkaran (1987 film) =

1987 film by S. P. Muthuraman

- Theatrical release poster
- Directed by: S. P. Muthuraman
- Based on: Namak Halaal
- Produced by: Rajam Balachander; Pushpa Kandaswamy
- Starring: Rajinikanth; Sarath Babu; Pallavi; Amala
- Cinematography: T. S. Vinayagam
- Edited by: R. Vittal; C. Lancy
- Music by: Ilaiyaraaja
- Production company: Kavithalayaa Productions
- Release date: 7 March 1987
- Country: India
- Language: Tamil

Velaikkaran (pronounced [ʋeːlaɪkkaːɾan] transl. Servant) is a 1987 Indian Tamil-language masala film directed by S. P. Muthuraman, starring Rajinikanth, Sarath Babu, Amala and Pallavi. It is a remake of the 1982 Hindi film Namak Halaal. The film was released on 7 March 1987 and became a box office success.

== Plot ==
Gajapathy is a loyal employee of Ramraj, who often ends up in violent situations for Ramraj's sake. They suspect Ramraj's cousin Dhanraj of being a threat who eyes Ramraj’s wealth. Gajapathy's wife, Savithri, fears for her husband’s safety. Ramraj entrusts his baby son, Rajkumar, to Savithri's care and also transfers his wealth to Savithri's name. Soon after, Dhanraj kills both Gajapathy and Ramraj. On his deathbed, Gajapathy makes Savithri promise to protect Rajkumar at any cost and preserve the property for him. He also asks her to hide their own son, Ragupathy, with his paternal grandfather, Valayapathy, in Anaipatti village. Savithri, with the help of Ramraj's assistant Nathan, escapes with Rajkumar, while Savithri's maid Annamma takes Ragupathy. Midway, Annamma is stabbed but manages to carry Ragupathy to Valayapathy before dying. Valayapathy assumes Savithri abandoned her biological son and ran off with Ramraj's child for money. He forces her to promise never to reveal that she is Ragupathy's mother to anyone. Later, news arrives that a flight carrying Dhanraj crashed near Bombay, killing him. Savithri and Nathan feel relieved, believing the danger to Rajkumar is over.

Years later, Ragupathy has grown into a carefree youth and moves to Madras for work. Unknown to everyone, Dhanraj is still alive; he avoided the flight crash that was thought to have killed him, and the passenger list with his name misled people into believing he died. Dhanraj reveals to his son, Pounraj, that Savithri is Rajkumar's caretaker and orders him to kill Rajkumar, who is in Germany, so he can claim the property. In Madras, Ragupathy runs into Savithri, but neither knows they are mother and son. He meets his village friend Vaiyapuri, a struggling photographer, who takes him to a party at Rajkumar's 5‑star hotel that Pounraj manages. Ragupathy performs at the party, gains Pounraj’s trust, and is hired as a bearer. At the hotel, he meets room‑service captain Kousalya, and they fall in love after Ragupathy beats up a guest who misbehaved with her.

Meanwhile, Pounraj tries to have Rajkumar killed while he's skiing in Germany, but Rajkumar escapes and retrieves a letter from one of the attackers, leading him to suspect Savithri of plotting against him. His guardian tells him that Savithri isn't his biological mother. When Rajkumar returns to Madras, he acts cold toward Savithri and chooses to stay at the hotel, avoiding her. During his birthday celebration, a dog eats the cake and dies, reinforcing Rajkumar's suspicion that Savithri is trying to kill him. Ragupathy gains Rajkumar's trust by exposing a theft at the hotel involving a girl Rajkumar had brought in. When Rajkumar slaps him, Ragupathy quits out of pride, but Rajkumar stops him, apologizes, and hires him as his personal assistant to help uncover threats.

Soon, Valayapathy arrives disguised as a foreigner and checks into the same hotel. Ragupathy tries to uncover why his grandfather is pretending, but fails. Valayapathy realizes Kousalya loves Ragupathy and accepts their relationship. To test Valayapathy, Ragupathy pretends to be drunk, revealing his true identity and explaining he's been playing a role to see if Ragupathy remains the innocent boy from the village. Meanwhile, Dhanraj hires dancer Nisha to help kill Rajkumar. She reluctantly agrees because Dhanraj's men threaten her mother. Nisha lures Rajkumar on a drive, where goons capture him, but Ragupathy arrives in time to save him. When confronted, Nisha says she didn't see the person behind the plan, fueling Rajkumar’s suspicion toward Savithri.

Rajkumar confronts Savithri, accusing her of not being his biological mother and of being involved in his father Ramraj's death and property looting. Overhearing this, Ragupathy learns Savithri is his biological mother. Rajkumar, angry, decides to sell the properties, and Savithri pleads with Ragupathy to stop him. Savithri also discovers that Dhanraj is still alive. Ragupathy vows to uncover the truths and force the culprits to confess, so Rajkumar will stop doubting Savithri. Dhanraj's men pose as property buyers, and Ragupathy deliberately distracts and drives them away. He discovers that Pounraj was behind the German attack, and so, he pretends to join Pounraj's plan, but Pounraj secretly records the conversation and shows it to Rajkumar, who then chases Ragupathy out of the hotel. Savithri, believing the recording, beats Ragupathy, but Valayapathy intervenes, revealing that Ragupathy is her son, and they reunite.

Nathan brings the old documents Savithri wrote for toddler Rajkumar, and Rajkumar finally trusts her and learns that Ragupathy is Savithri's son. Ragupathy captures Pounraj, learns Dhanraj is alive, and follows him to his hideout in Thiruvanmiyur. Dhanraj captures Savithri, Valayapathy, Nisha, and her mother, demanding that Ragupathy get Rajkumar to sign the property documents. After Rajkumar signs, Pounraj shoots him, but the papers turn blank—Rajkumar's "death" was a staged ruse planned by Rajkumar and Ragupathy. A fight breaks out, and Pounraj kidnaps Kousalya and escapes with Rajkumar in a lorry, but Ragupathy blocks them, holding Dhanraj hostage. The police arrest Dhanraj and Pounraj, and finally, Savithri is reunited with her sons, Ragupathy and Rajkumar, who are married to Kousalya and Nisha, respectively.

== Cast ==
- Rajinikanth as Ragupathy
- Amala as Kousalya
- K. R. Vijaya as Savithri
- Sarath Babu as Rajkumar
- Pallavi as Nisha
- V. K. Ramasamy as Valayapathy
- Senthil as Vaiyapuri
- R. N. Sudarshan as Dhanraj
- Nassar as Pounraj
- Delhi Ganesh as Nathan, Ramraj's assistant
- S. R. Veeraraghavan as Ramraj, Gajapathy's boss
- Achamillai Gopi as Hari, Kausalya's brother
- Shihan Hussaini as a hotel guest
- Srikanth as Gajapathy
- Typist Gopu as Ragupathy's coworker
- Omakuchi Narasimhan as a villager
- Bayilvan Ranganathan as Vaiyapuri's customer
- Master Suresh
- A. Sakunthala as Nisha's mother
- Vijayachandrika as Annamma
- Puliyur Saroja as a brahmin woman in the song "Maamanukku Mayilapoorethaan"
- Pyramid Natarajan in a cameo appearance as Rajkumar's guardian in Germany

== Production ==
Rajinikanth acted without taking any remuneration, due to the losses the producers suffered from Sri Raghavendrar (1985). Since the film had scenes revolving in a hotel, those scenes were shot in Chola Hotel at Madras (now Chennai) and also at other hotels in Delhi, Kashmir and Agra. For the song "Mamanukku", Muthuraman who was in search of an old couple made the song's dance choreographer Puliyur Saroja and the film's associate director S. L. Narayanan dance for the song. In his memoir AVM Thandha SPM, Muthuraman said the song "Vaa Vaa" was shot at Shimla. However, in his column for Hindu Tamil Thisai, Cinema Eduthu Paar, he said it was shot at Srinagar.

== Soundtrack ==
The soundtrack was composed by Ilaiyaraaja, with lyrics by Mu. Metha. This is the first film where Mano sang for Rajinikanth. The song "Vaa Vaa Kanna" is set in Hamsadhvani raga.

Track listing
No.	Title	Singer(s)	Length
1.	"Enakku Thaa Un Uyirai"	B. S. Sasirekha	4:28
2.	"Maamanukku Mayilapoorethaan"	Malaysia Vasudevan	4:36
3.	"Pethu Eduthavathaan"	Malaysia Vasudevan	4:34
4.	"Va Va Va Kanna"	Mano, K. S. Chithra	5:53
5.	"Velai Ilathavan"	Mano	4:24
6.	"Thotathile Paathi"	S. P. Balasubrahmanyam, Saibaba, S.P. Sailaja	6:23
Total length:			29:38

== Release and reception ==
Velaikkaran was released on 7 March 1987. The Indian Express called it "pretty run of the mill stuff". Jayamanmadhan of Kalki criticised the story. The film became a box office success, and Rajinikanth won the Sunflash Award for Best Actor.

== Bibliography ==
- Muthuraman, S. P. (2017) [2005]. AVM Thandha SPM (in Tamil) (3rd ed.). Vikatan. OCLC 607342391.
- Ramachandran, Naman (2014) [2012]. Rajinikanth: The Definitive Biography. New Delhi: Penguin Books. ISBN 978-0-14-342111-5.
- Sundararaman (2007) [2005]. Raga Chintamani: A Guide to Carnatic Ragas Through Tamil Film Music (2nd ed.). Pichhamal Chintamani. OCLC 295034757.
