= Panakkaran =

1990 film by P. Vasu

- Poster
- Directed by: P. Vasu
- Screenplay by: P. Vasu
- Story by: R. M. Veerappan
- Produced by: T. G. Thyagarajan; V. Thamizhazhagan
- Starring: Rajinikanth; Gautami
- Cinematography: M. C. Sekar
- Edited by: K. R. Krishnan
- Music by: Ilaiyaraaja
- Production company: Sathya Movies
- Release date: 14 January 1990
- Country: India
- Language: Tamil

Panakkaran (transl. Rich man) is a 1990 Indian Tamil-language masala film directed by P. Vasu. A remake of the Hindi film Lawaaris (1981), it stars Rajinikanth and Gautami. The film was released on 14 January 1990, Pongal day, and ran for more than 175 days in theatres.

== Plot ==
Bhuvana is a famous singer and she is in love with Vishwanathan, a leading business man. She gets pregnant before wedding but Vishwanathan wants it to be aborted. Bhuvana, who doesn't want to abort her child, decides to break up with Vishwanathan and she leaves with her brother Rao Bahadur without informing Vishwanathan. Bhuvana gives birth to a baby boy but Rao takes away the baby and gives it to Aarumugam, a drunkard asking him to kill the baby and lies to Bhuvana that the baby was a stillborn. Bhuvana leaves the hospital without informing anyone and even Rao Bahadur doesn't know her whereabouts.

Meanwhile, Aarumugam decides to raise the baby on his own instead of killing it with the intention of making some money with the help of baby. He names the baby as Muthu. Muthu gets a job in a factory which is owned by Shankar, who happens to be the son of Vishwanathann and Pushpa. It is shown that Vishwanathann leads an unhappy life with his wife Pushpa in an estate. He feels guilty about his betrayal to Bhuvana thinking she is dead and Rao Bahadur uses this opportunity to make some money out of it.

Muthu understands that workers are not paid properly in Shankar's factory and decides to fight against it which angers Shankar and Rao Bahadur. Latha, who happens to be Rao Bahadur's only daughter falls in love with Muthu without knowing his true identity. One day, Muthu breaks the liquor bottles as Aarumugam buy dozens of alcohol bottles in Muthu's first salary. Aarumugam gets furious seeing this and reveals that Muthu is an orphan which makes Muthu worry and he leaves Aarumugam's home. Later Shankar transfers Muthu to work in his estate present at Ooty with the plan of killing him. Muthu meets Vishwanathan in the estate and gets into his good books. During a function, Shankar plans to kill Muthu but accidentally Vishwanathan gets hurt and is in need of a rare blood group for surgery. Now it is revealed that Bhuvana is alive and she stays in an ashram. Seeing the advertisement for blood requirement, she comes forward to save Vishwanathan. On the way, Shankar and Rao Bahadur tries to kill her so that Vishwanathan will also die. But Muthu saves her. Now it is revealed that Muthu is the son of Bhuvana and they are united. Vishwanatan is saved and he marries Bhuvana with the consent of Pushpa.

== Cast ==
- Rajinikanth as Muthu
- Gautami as Charulatha/Latha
- Vijayakumar as Viswanath
- Sumithra as Bhuvaneswari
- Sathyapriya as Puspha
- Radha Ravi as Rao Bahathur
- Charan Raj as Shankar
- Devisri as Lakshmi
- Achamillai Gopi as Gopi
- Senthamarai as Aarumugam
- Santhana Bharathi as Samiyar
- Janagaraj as Sabapathy
- Pandu as Ponnusamy
- Thyagu as Estate Manager
- Rangammal
- K. Samarasam as doctor
- Mayilsamy as Factory Worker
- Kullamani as Guest Appearance
- Usilai Mani as Guest Appearance

== Production ==
To celebrate the silver jubilee of the production company Sathya Movies, R. M. Veerappan decided to remake the Hindi film Laawaris with Rajinikanth and chose P. Vasu as the director. Vasu made changes to the screenplay for Tamil version by eliminating unnecessary characters from the original. The film marked the first of several collaborations between Rajinikanth and Vasu. While filming the song "Nooru Varusham", Rajinikanth dressed in drag. The scene where Rajinikanth's character expresses his sadness to Gautami's character was shot at Gem Granites, Madras (now Chennai).

== Soundtrack ==
The soundtrack was composed by Ilaiyaraaja. The song "Nooru Varusham" is frequently played at wedding receptions in Tamil Nadu. It was also featured in the 2025 Tamil feature film Dude. The song "Ullukulla Chakravarthy" is set in Mayamalavagowla raga.

Track listing
No.	Title	Lyrics	Singer(s)	Length
1.	"Ding Dang Dang; Irandum Ondrodu Ondru"	Pulamaipithan	S. P. Balasubrahmanyam, K. S. Chithra	5:00
2.	"Maraththa Vechchavan"	Ilaiyaraaja	Ilaiyaraaja	3:59
3.	"Nooru Varusham" (female)	Vaali	S. Janaki	4:27
4.	"Nooru Varusham" (male)	Vaali	Mano	4:27
5.	"Silence Silence"	Piraisoodan	S. P. Balasubrahmanyam, S. Janaki	4:38
6.	"Ullukulla Chakaravarthy"	Ilaiyaraaja	Ilaiyaraaja	4:31

== Release and reception ==
Panakkaran was released on 14 January 1990, Pongal day. The Hindu wrote, "A well chalked out screenplay with effective penmanship coupled with ideal situations to suit Rajinikanth contribute to make Sathya Movies Panakkaran one of the good release of Pongal". P. S. S. of Kalki wrote the only worthy thing to remember was Rajinikanth's acting, while praising the humour and found the music to be okayish. The film ran for more than 175 days in theatres.
