= List of Tamil films of 1981 =

Post-amendment to the Tamil Nadu Entertainments Tax Act 1939 on 1 April 1958, Gross jumped to 140 per cent of Nett Commercial Taxes Department disclosed ₹32 crore in entertainment tax revenue for the year.

The following is a list of films produced in the Tamil film industry in India in 1981, in alphabetical order.

== Tamil films released in 1981 ==
| Title | Director | Producer | Music | Cast |
|---|---|---|---|---|
| 47 Natkal | K. Balachander | Premalaya Productions | M. S. Viswanathan | Chiranjeevi, Jaya Prada, Sarath Babu, Rama Prabha |
| Aani Ver | K. Vijayan | Vivekananda Pictures | Shankar–Ganesh | Sivakumar, Saritha, Sathyaraj |
| Adugal Nanaigindrana | P. Madhavan | Shanti Chithra Productions | Chandrabose | Prasad, Roopa |
| Alaigal Oivathillai | Bharathiraja | Pavalar Creation | Ilaiyaraaja | Karthik, Radha, Thiagarajan, Silk Smitha |
| Amara Kaaviyam | Amirtham | Viswanathan Combines | M. S. Viswanathan | Sivaji Ganesan, Sripriya, Madhavi, Jai Ganesh, Nagesh |
| Anbulla Atthan | Kanmani Subbhu | Metha Movies | M. S. Viswanathan | Shoba, Kalaivanan |
| Andhi Mayakkam | Bhanudasan | Yuvaraja Pictures | Shyam | Vanitha, Manoj, Gandhimathi, Vinod, Suveetha |
| Andru Muthal Indru Varai | R. Sundaram | Modern Theatres | Shankar–Ganesh | Sivakumar, Roopa, G. Srinivasan, Jayamala, Kalaranjini |
| Anicha Malar | Sri Vijayakumar | Sri Kaleeswari Movies | Shankar–Ganesh | Raja Bahadoor, Lakshmi Kala, Suruli Rajan, Manorama, Gandhimathi |
| Andha 7 Naatkal | K. Bhagyaraj | Srini Creations | M. S. Viswanathan | K. Bhagyaraj, Ambika, Rajesh |
| Anjatha Nenjangal | R. Thyagarajan | Devar Films | Shankar–Ganesh | K. R. Vijaya, Suman, Saritha, Vanitha |
| Aradhanai | Prasad | Dimple Creations | Ilaiyaraaja | Suman, Sumalatha, Nizhalgal Ravi |
| Arthangal Ayiram | S. A. Rajkannu | Sri Amman Creations | Shankar–Ganesh | Bhuvaneswari |
| Arumbugal | Jupiter Chinnadurai | Kamatchi Art Films | M. S. Viswanathan | Sarath Babu, Sridevi |
| Avalum Thaayaanal | Mohammed Ali | Nachiar Films | Gunasingh | M. G. Venugopal, Jayavani |
| Aval Oru Kaviyam | Durai | Sri Sivalayaa Films | V. Kumar | Jai Ganesh, Sumithra, Savitri, Kavitha, Suruli Rajan, Sachu |
| Avasarakari | K. S. Mathangan | Anand Creations | Shankar–Ganesh | Mohan Kumar, Roopa |
| Bala Nagamma | K. Shankar | Charuchithra Films | Ilaiyaraaja | K. R. Vijaya, Sarath Babu, Sridevi |
| Chinna Mul Peria Mul | N. S. Raj Bharath | Indra Creations | Shankar–Ganesh | Raja, Sreenath, Shanthi Krishna, Sumanjali, 'Baby' Anju |
| Deiva Thirumanangal | P. Neelakantan; K. Shankar; K. Kameswara Rao | Solar Combines | K. V. Mahadevan; M. S. Viswanathan; G. K. Venkatesh | Seerkazhi Govindarajan, S. Varalakshmi, Chandra Mohan, Latha, Srividya, Moorthy |
| Devi Dharisanam | K. Shankar | Malar Combines | M. S. Viswanathan | K. R. Vijaya, Latha, Sarath Babu, |
| Ellam Inba Mayyam | G. N. Rangarajan | P. A. Art Productions | Ilaiyaraaja | Kamal Haasan, Jaishankar, Madhavi, Suman, Surekha, Y. G. Mahendra, K. S. Jayalakshmi, Thengai Srinivasan, Manorama |
| Enakkaga Kaathiru | P. S. Nivas | Niveda Combines | Ilaiyaraaja | Suman, Bhanu Chander, Sumalatha, Nisha |
| Enga Ooru Kannagi | K. Balachander | Ranjith Arts | M. S. Viswanathan | Saritha, Seema, Madhavi, Srikanth, Major Sundarrajan |
| Engamma Maharani | M. A. Kaja | Sri Gayathri Enterprises | Shankar–Ganesh | Delhi Ganesh, Sumithra, Roopa, Suruli Rajan |
| Garjanai | C. V. Rajendran | Hem Nag Films | Ilaiyaraaja | Rajinikanth, Madhavi, Jaishankar, Geetha |
| Indru Poi Naalai Vaa | K. Bhagyaraj | Rishad Creations | Ilayaraaja | K. Bhagyaraj, Radhika, Pazhanisamy, G. Ramli |
| Jadhikkoru Needhi | S. A. Chandrasekhar | Vadalooran Combines | Shankar–Ganesh | Vijayakanth, Swapna |
| Kaalam | R. S. Somanathan | Kala Chitra Arts | Shankar–Ganesh | K. R. Vijaya, Raveendran, Menaka |
| Kadal Meengal | G. N. Rangarajan | K. R. G. Art Productions | Ilaiyaraaja | Kamal Haasan, Sujatha, Swapna, Suman, Ambika, Nagesh, Thengai Srinivasan |
| Kadavulin Theerpu | C. N. Shanmugam | Senthil Sevarkodiyaan Creations | R. Govardhanam | Vijay Babu, Sangeetha, Major Sundarrajan, C. R. Vijayakumari, Srikanth, Cho, Suruli Rajan |
| Kalam Oru Naal Maarum | N. A. Panneer Selvam | Saroj Films | V. Kumar | Vijayakumar, Saritha |
| Kalthoon | Major Sundarrajan | S. S. K. Films | M. S. Viswanathan | Sivaji Ganesan, K. R. Vijaya, Major Sundarrajan, Nagesh |
| Kannadi | M. A. Kaja | Senthil Creations | V. Kumar | Vijayan, Deepa |
| Kanneer Pookkal | Rajasekhar | Jayavel Productions | Shankar–Ganesh | Vijayan, Sripriya, Roopa |
| Kanneeril Ezhudhadhe | Gangai Kondan | Iqbal Creation | Shyam | |
| Kanni Magamayi | M. Duraithangam | Sri Kumaralayaa Films | Shankar–Ganesh | Suruli Rajan |
| Kanni Theevu | T. R. Ramanna | Sri Ayvar Art Films | Ilaiyaraaja | Jaishankar, Radhika, Seema |
| Karaiyellam Shenbagapoo | G. N. Rangarajan | Sundari Art Creations | Ilaiyaraaja | Pratap K. Pothen, Sripriya, Sumalatha, Sundar |
| Kazhugu | S. P. Muthuraman | P. A. Art Productions | Ilaiyaraaja | Rajinikanth, Rathi, Sumalatha, Cho, Thengai Srinivasan, Y. G. Mahendra, Vanitha |
| Keezh Vaanam Sivakkum | V. Srinivasan | Vidhya Movies | M. S. Viswanathan | Sivaji Ganesan, Jaishankar, Saritha, Sarath Babu, Menaka, Y. G. Mahendra |
| Kilinjalgal | Durai | Sunitha Cine Arts | T. Rajendar | Mohan, Poornima, Dileep |
| Kodeeswaran Magal | A. Kodandarami Reddy | Sri Sovereign Combines | K. Chakravarthy | Sivakumar, Rajyalakshmi, Thengai Srinivasan, Sowcar Janaki, V. K. Ramasamy, Manorama |
| Koocham | Soman | Velan Creations | Gangai Amaran | Sarath Babu |
| Koyil Puraa | K. Vijayan | R. M. C. Creations | Ilaiyaraaja | Saritha, Shankar, K. Murugaiyan, Raja Bahadoor, Silk Smitha |
| Kudumbam Oru Kadambam | S. P. Muthuraman | Visakam Pictures | M. S. Viswanathan | Pratap K. Pothen, Suhasini, Sumalatha, S. Ve. Shekher, Visu, Kamala Kamesh, Nithya |
| Kulakozhundhu | T. R. Ramanna | E. V. R. Pictures | M. S. Viswanathan | Jaishankar, Sripriya |
| Lorry Driver Rajakannu | A. C. Tirulokchandar | Raja Mahalakshmi Arts | M. S. Viswanathan | Sivaji Ganesan, Sripriya, Suruli Rajan |
| Maadi Veettu Ezhai | Amirtham | Poompuhar Pictures | M. S. Viswanathan | Sivaji Ganesan, Sujatha, Sripriya |
| Madhu Malar | Bharathi-Vasu | Rishad Creations | Gangai Amaran | Pratap K. Pothen, Suhasini, Dileep, Ratheesh, Vanitha |
| Magarandham | K. S. Gopalakrishnan | Chithra Productions | Shankar–Ganesh | Mohan Ram, Radhika, Aruna |
| Makal Marumakalaanal | O. R. J. Abdul Rahim | Fathima Movie Productions | Kudanthai Subbaiya | Rajesh (Tamil actor), Vadivukkarasi |
| Mangala Lakshmi | Thiruchengodu Marimuthu | Mahalakshmi Arts | Thiruchengodu Marimuthu | Srikanth, Sangeetha |
| Mayil | Durai | Priya Chithra Films | Shankar–Ganesh | Vijayan, Shoba, Shankar, Roopa, Suruli Rajan |
| Mayyakkam | Unknown | Cecilia Productions | Peter-Ruban | Srikanth, Padmapriya |
| Meendum Kokila | G. N. Rangarajan | Charuchithra Films | Ilaiyaraaja | Kamal Haasan, Sridevi, Deepa |
| Meendum Sandhippom | M. A. Kaja | Kadayanallur Cine Arts | Shankar–Ganesh | Vijay Babu, Srikamu, Rathi Devi, Jayamala |
| Mohana Punnagai | C. V. Sridhar | Sarathy Motion Pictures | M. S. Viswanathan | Sivaji Ganesan, Jayabharathi, Geetha, Padmapriya, Anuradha, Nagesh |
| Mouna Geethangal | K. Bhagyaraj | Bagavathy Creations | Gangai Amaran | K. Bhagyaraj, Saritha, 'Master' Suresh |
| Mouna Yuddham | N. Sambandham | K. R. K. Creations | K. V. Mahadevan; Shankar–Ganesh | Raveendran, Roopa, Shankar |
| Nadhi Ondru Karai Moondru | M. A. Thirumugam | Vadivelan Films | M. S. Viswanathan | Sudhakar, Mohan Sharma, Illavarasan, Radhika |
| Nadigan Kural | A. Jagannathan | M. C. Brothers Production | M. S. Viswanathan | M. G. C. Sukumar, Saira Banu, M. N. Nambiar |
| Nallathu Nadanthe Theerum | K. Narayanan | K. N. Films | Ilaiyaraaja | Suman, Surekha |
| Nandu | Mahendran | Rangaraj Creation | Ilaiyaraaja | Ashwini, Sundar, Vanitha |
| Needhi Pizhaithathu | S. A. Chandrasekhar | Sharada Arts | Shankar–Ganesh | Vijayakanth, Jaishankar, Aruna, Silk Smitha |
| Nellikani | Kalaignanam | Bhairavi Creation | Shankar–Ganesh | Sivakumar, Sivachandran, Sumithra, Swapna |
| Nenjil Oru Mull | 'Mathi Oli' Shanmugham | Santosh Art Films | G. K. Venkatesh | Pratap K. Pothen, Poornima Bhagyaraj, Sivachandran, |
| Nenjile Thunivirunthal | S. A. Chandrasekhar | Veeralakshmi Combines | Shankar–Ganesh | Vijayakanth, Swapna, Vijayashanti, Goundamani, Manorama |
| Neruppile Pootha Malar | Kausik | Elizabeth Productions | K. V. Mahadevan | Sivakumar, Poornima |
| Netrikkan | S. P. Muthuraman | Kavithalayaa Productions | Ilaiyaraaja | Rajinikanth, Lakshmi, Saritha, Menaka, Vijayashanti |
| Noolarauntha Pattam | R. S. Jothe | Shree Nathi Movies | Stalin Varadharajan | Vijayakanth, Chakravarthy, Poornimadevi, Suvitha |
| Oonjal | Ziyavudeen | Sri Swamy Enterprises | Shyam | Vijayan, Vijaybabu, Vadivukkarasi |
| Oru Iravu Oru Paravai | P. C. Reddy | Eswari Chithra Productions | Ilaiyaraaja | Sarath Babu, Latha, Vijaykumar, Ravinder, Sankar |
| Oruthi Mattum Karaiyinile | J. Ramu | Sri Amman Art Productions | Gangai Amaran | Sudhakar, Rajesh, Saritha |
| Paakku Vethalai | R. S. Vairavan | Samsu Creations | Malaysia Vasudevan | Rajesh, Sumithra |
| Panimalar | Hemachandran | Jeppiar Pictures | Shankar–Ganesh | Raveendran, Usha Rajendar, Madhavi |
| Palaivana Solai | Robert–Rajasekar | R. V. Creations | Shankar–Ganesh | Suhasini, Chandrasekhar, Rajeev |
| Panneer Pushpangal | Bharathi-Vasu | Hemachitra Arts | Ilaiyaraaja | Pratap K. Pothen, Suresh, Shanthi Krishna, Archana |
| Pattam Padhavi | Thirumugan | Thirumurugan Creations | M. S. Viswanathan | K. A. Thangavelu, Manorama, Delhi Ganesh, Sumithra, Y. G. Mahendra, Usha Rajendar, Rani Padmini |
| Pen Manam Pesugirathu | A. Jagannathan | Kanniammal Pictures | Shankar–Ganesh | Sudhakar, Sumalatha |
| Pennin Vazhkai | K. Vijayan | Annapoorna Art Pictures | G. K. Venkatesh | Sudhakar, Rathi, Aruna, Sumathi |
| Ponnazhagi | O. Muthu | M. R. R. Creations | Shankar–Ganesh | A. K. Rajendran, Sumathi, Ceylon Nambiar, Jai Vijay, Jamila, Sri Kamu |
| Purandharadasar | R. Ramamurthy | Sri Ganesha Enterprises | Pendyala Nageswara Rao | Child Artist aged between 10 - 14 |
| Rail Payanangalil | T. Rajendar | G. R. P. Arts | T. Rajendar | Sreenath, Rajeev, Jyothi, Sivaranjani |
| Raja Paarvai | Singeetam Srinivasa Rao | Haasan Brothers | Ilaiyaraaja | Kamal Haasan, Madhavi, L. V. Prasad, Y. G. Mahendra |
| Rajangam | R. C. Sakthi | R. V. Creations | Shankar–Ganesh | Chandrasekhar, Vijayashanti, Charuhasan, Delhi Ganesh, Manorama, P. R. Varalakshmi |
| Ram Lakshman | R. Thyagarajan | Devar Films | Ilaiyaraaja | Kamal Haasan, Sripriya, Raveendran |
| Rani | Bharathan | Supriya Creations | M. S. Viswanathan | Pratap K. Pothen, Nithya |
| Ranuva Veeran | S. P. Muthuraman | Sathya Movies | M. S. Viswanathan | Rajinikanth, Sridevi, Chiranjeevi |
| Rathathin Rathame | Joe Devanand | Brighton Films | Shankar–Ganesh | Jaishankar |
| Sanditthanam | sobanan | Dimple Creations | Ilaiyaraaja | Sobanan, Rukku |
| Sankarlal | T. N. Balu | Balu Cine Arts | Ilaiyaraaja; Gangai Amaran | Kamal Haasan, Sridevi, Seema |
| Sathya Sundharam | K. S. Prakash Rao | Balakrishna Combines | M. S. Viswanathan | Sivaji Ganesan, K. R. Vijaya, Vijayakumar, Sripriya, Madhavi |
| Sattam Oru Iruttarai | S. A. Chandrasekhar | Vadalooran Combines | Shankar–Ganesh | Vijayakanth, Poornima, Vasumathi |
| Savaal | R. Krishnamoorthy | Sujatha Cine Arts | M. S. Viswanathan | Kamal Haasan, Jaishankar, Sripriya, Vijayakumar, Manorama, Y. G. Mahendra |
| Sivappu Aatril Oru Neela Malar | Damodara Raghavan | K.S.K. Creations | Williams | Lakshmi Sri, Reena |
| Sivappu Malli | Rama Narayanan | AVM Productions | Shankar–Ganesh | Vijayakanth, Chandrasekhar, Shanthi Krishna, Aruna |
| Sollathe Yarum Kettaal | N. S. Raj Bharath | Surya Art Films | Shankar–Ganesh | Pratap K. Pothen, Sumalatha |
| Sooravali | Nemai Ghosh | Chitra Bharathi | Vijaya Bhaskar | Vijay, Lavanya |
| Sorgathin Thirappu Vizha | A. Jagannathan | Kanchi Combines | Shankar–Ganesh | Jai Ganesh, Jayachitra |
| Sumai | Rama Narayanan | Sri Thenandal Films | Gangai Amaran | Vijayan, Chandrasekhar, Usha Rajendar, Vijayashanti |
| Thanneer Thanneer | K. Balachander | Kalakendra Movies | M. S. Viswanathan | Saritha, V. K. Veeraswami, Prasanna Srinivasan, Radha Ravi |
| Tharayil Vazhum Meengal | Babu Maharaja | K. K. Combines | Chandrabose | Sudhakar, Ambika |
| Thee | R. Krishnamoorthy | Suresh Arts | M. S. Viswanathan | Rajinikanth, Suman, Shobha, Sowcar Janaki |
| Thillu Mullu | K. Balachander | Kalakendra Movies | M. S. Viswanathan | Rajinikanth, Madhavi, Thengai Srinivasan, Sowcar Janaki |
| Thiruppangal | Joseph Anandan | Maharani Productions | M. S. Viswanathan | Jai Ganesh, Sumithra, Fatafat Jayalaxmi, Radhika |
| Thodarum Charithirangal | Babu Maharaja | Leo Cine Arts | Chandrabose | Nizhalgal Ravi, Menaka |
| Tik Tik Tik | Bharathiraja | Shiv Shakti Films | Ilaiyaraaja | Kamal Haasan, Madhavi, Swapna, Radha, Thengai Srinivasan |
| Udhayamaagirathu | Ranjith | Jai Murugan Art Creations | A. A. Raj | Sankar, Sivaranjani, Swarna |
| Vaa Intha Pakkam | Moulee | Ponmalar International | Shyam | Pratap K. Pothen, Deepa |
| Vaadagai Veedu | Durai | Murali Karthikeyan Pictures | Shankar–Ganesh | Vijayan, Suman, Shoba, Sathyakala, Suruli Rajan |
| Varayatha Oviyam | | Giri Art Production | Gunasingh | Rajeev (Tamil actor) |
| Vasanthakalam | M. A. Kaja | Abirami Enterprises | Shankar–Ganesh | Sumithra, Suruli Rajan |
| Velichathukku Vaanga | Vijayasarathi | Abhirami Creations | Gangai Amaran | Rajesh, Urmila, Rathi Devi |
| Vidiyum Varai Kaathiru | K. Bhagyaraj | S. T. Combines | Ilaiyaraaja | K. Bhagyaraj, Sathyakala |
