= G. N. R. Kumaravelan =

Tamil film director (born 1978)

- Born: G. N. Rangaraja Kumaravelan; 22 November 1978 (age 47); Tamil Nadu, India
- Occupation: Film director
- Years active: 2009 – present
- Parent: G. N. Rangarajan (father)

G. N. R. Kumaravelan is an Indian film director, who works in Tamil cinema. After assisting directors Balu Mahendra and Kamal Haasan in their films, Kumaravelan's directorial debut was the 2009 film Ninaithale Inikkum, and his second was the 2011 film Yuvan Yuvathi. His third film Haridas (2013), led to him being nominated for the Filmfare Award for Best Tamil Director.

== Career ==
=== 1980s-1990s: Early life, work ===
Kumaravelan is the son of former director G. N. Rangarajan, who had extensively collaborated with actor Kamal Haasan in his career, directing films including Kalyanaraman (1979), Meendum Kokila (1981) and Maharasan (1993). Kumaravelan worked as an assistant director under Balu Mahendra in Sathi Leelavathi (1995) and then in Kamal Haasan's unreleased ventures Ladies Only and Marudhanayagam.

=== 2009-12: Early directing ===
Kumaravelan's first feature film was the 2009 mystery drama film Ninaithale Inikkum, the Tamil remake of the 2006 Malayalam film Classmates. Featuring an ensemble cast including Prithviraj, Shakthi, Karthik Kumar, Priyamani and Anuja Iyer; the film was marketed by Sun Pictures and was super hit run at the box office. He then began pre-production on a film featuring R. Madhavan in the lead role, but the venture eventually did not materialise.

His second film was the romantic comedy, Yuvan Yuvathi featuring Bharath, Rima Kallingal and Santhanam. The film received mixed reviews after release in August 2011, with a critic noting that "Yuvan Yuvathi feels like being stuffed with stale food. You're likely to regurgitate", though Malathi Rangarajan from The Hindu stated, "A predictable yet enjoyable finish to a love story that sparkles with the energy of youth!".

=== 2013-22: Haridas and later career ===
Kumaravelan then moved on to make Haridas (2013), a drama film starring Kishore and Sneha revolving around the issues of caring for an autistic child, played by Prithviraj Das. The film opened to largely positive reviews from critics, with Sify.com noting that the film"rugs at your heartstrings, and urges you to introspect and makes you look at children with disability differently." Other reviews from The Hindu rated the movie "deserves to be supported.", while Behindwoods.com wrote that the movie was an "honourable tribute to parental love and sacrifice." The film was recognized at award ceremonies and film festivals, being nominated for a Filmfare Award and receiving second place at the 11th Chennai International Film Festival.

In 2014, he was working on the pre-production of a film starring Vikram Prabhu and approached Alia Bhatt to play the leading female role. However, in June 2014, the producers shelved the venture citing financial restraints. The producers again started the venture. The project was called Wagah which would be a cross border romance between an Indian soldier and a Pakistani girl.

== Filmography ==
Year	Film	Notes
2009	Ninaithale Inikkum	
2011	Yuvan Yuvathi	
2013	Haridas	Also playback singer
2016	Wagah	
2022	Sinam	
