= Maharasan =

1993 film by G. N. Rangarajan

- Theatrical release poster
- Directed by: G. N. Rangarajan
- Screenplay by: G. N. Rangarajan
- Story by: Gopu-Babu
- Produced by: G. N. Rangarajan
- Starring: Kamal Haasan; Bhanupriya
- Cinematography: M. Kesavan
- Edited by: K. R. Ramalingam
- Music by: Ilaiyaraaja
- Production company: Kumaravel Films
- Release date: 5 March 1993
- Running time: 149 minutes
- Country: India
- Language: Tamil

Maharasan is a 1993 Indian Tamil-language comedy film produced, directed and co-written by G. N. Rangarajan. The film stars Kamal Haasan and Bhanupriya, while Ramesh Aravind, Chandrasekhar, Goundamani, Senthil, Vadivelu, V. K. Ramasamy, Raghavi and Vadivukkarasi play supporting roles. It was released on 5 March 1993. Haasan acted in the film without any payment, to help his friend Rangarajan come out of his financial crisis. The film ran successfully in theatres, thereby becoming a profitable venture and helped Rangarajan recover from his earlier debts.

== Plot ==
Vadivelu, a butcher, lives with his 16-year-old sister Rani in a slum. His neighbour Selvi is in love with Vadivelu and considers marrying him. Irritated with her first, he starts to like Selvi but he said he will only marry her if Rani gets married first but she is too young for marriage. However, Rani is in love with Ramesh and told Selvi. Selvi then disguise as a boy who is in love with Rani so that Ramesh could compete with the 'boy' Selvi to win Rani. Ramesh and Rani end up falling in love and Selvi revealed to Ramesh that she is a girl and that she wanted him and Rani to marry so that she can marry Vadivelu. However, Ramesh knows that his family would not accept their relationship because of their class difference.

Meanwhile, Ramesh's father Paramasivan and his driver Govindan encounter Selvi's father who is an alcoholic and broke his carriage where he irons shirt. This causes Vadivelu to get involved and have a dispute with Paramasivan. Paramasivan tries to amend their relationship with Vadivelu by bribing him to vote for Paramasivan in the election but Vadivelu revealed that he would do it only if they build bathrooms at their place. Paramasivan refuses and replace the concept with school so Vadivelu became petty and voted for Paramasivan's opposite party as he was bribed as well.

Things take a turn when Paramasivan's wife Vadivu keeps hinting that she cheated on him which Paramasivan keeps ignoring that till when he asked her in the car with Govindan, she revealed that one of their children is not his. This causes Govindan to crash and Vadivu fell out of the car and became comatose. Paramasivan desperately wants to know which child is not his biological son and whom his wife had an affair with, so he waits till his wife reaches out of the coma. He also asks Govidan not to tell everyone, which Govidan blackmails him in order to have a pay rise. Ramesh and Rani marry and he introduced his father to Rani which he does not accept as she is poor and locks Ramesh in his room. Selvi revealed to Vadivelu about Rani's marriage which enraged him that she did this behind his back. Rani revealed to Vadivelu that her in-laws do not accept her marriage. Vadivelu comes into Paramsivan's house and tries to convince him to accept his sister as his daughter-in-law. To everyone's surprise, Ramesh's older brother Sekar is revealed to be married and has a son who is also called Paramasivan. Sekar's father-in-law revealed everything to Paramasivan which he blurted out that either Sekar or Ramesh might not be his son. This causes the family to have debate and turn this into a competition to win their father's affection. Govindan suggested that which son cares about their father the most is definitely Paramasivan's biological son.

From having a fake genetic mole to feeding their father and taking care of Vadivu, things have failed. Sekar's father-in-law noticed that Paramasivan would give the will to his biological son, so he attempts to kill Paramasivan and put the blame on Ramesh for poisoning his father. That failed so he attempts to kill Vadivu because it would be more of the chance that she would reveal that Sekar is not Paramasivan's son. He got interrupted by Vadivelu who was praying for Vadivu and starts to fight him. Paramasivan caught him and Vadivu down the stairs that he sends him out. Vadivu regains her consciousness.

She finally reveals that their first child was a baby girl and she knew that Paramasivan would not accept a daughter otherwise he would leave her. So her father bribed one of the family in the delivery room who had a baby boy to swap babies. Hence it's revealed that Sekar (who was the eldest) is adopted. Vadivelu later comes to the realisation that Selvi is none other than Paramasivan and Vadivu's daughter because Selvi has the same pendant as Vadivu which she wore growing up. Sekar accepted that he was adopted and reconciled with Selvi's adopted father.

While they were doing a Pooja festival, Sekar's father-in-law disliked the fact that Sekar is adopted and wants the will for his family so he plants a bomb on each of the basket that the family was carrying. Vadivelu comes to realise and he saves the whole family. He learns that Sekar's father-in-law is behind this and fights him off.

The film ends with him Sekar's father-in-law being arrested and Vadivelu asking Paramasivan for Selvi's hand in marriage, which he accepts.

== Cast ==
- Kamal Haasan as Vadivelu
- Bhanupriya as Selvi
- Ramesh Aravind as Ramesh
- Chandrasekhar as Sekar
- Goundamani as Govindan
- Senthil as Sangu Pillai
- Vadivelu as the Kasappu Kadai Vadivelu's assistant
- V. K. Ramasamy as Paramasivan
- Raghavi as Rani
- Vadivukkarasi as Vadivu

== Production ==
Kamal Haasan worked again with director G. N. Rangarajan for the fifth and last time after a twelve-year break following three previous collaborations in Kalyanaraman (1979), Ellam Inba Mayyam (1981), Kadal Meengal (1981) and Meendum Kokila (1981). Haasan did this film only to bail out Rangarajan from financial problems. He sported a handlebar moustache for his role. This was Rangarajan's final film as a director.

== Soundtrack ==
The soundtrack was composed by Ilaiyaraaja and the lyrics were written by Vaali. It was released under the label AVM Audio.

Track listing
No.	Title	Singer(s)	Length
1.	"Arachu Arachu"	Mano, S. Janaki	05:06
2.	"Avana Ivana"	Malaysia Vasudevan	04:20
3.	"Entha Velu"	Malaysia Vasudevan, K. S. Chithra	05:04
4.	"Rakoozhi Koovum"	S. P. Balasubrahmanyam, S. Janaki	04:59
5.	"Rasa Maharasa"	Malaysia Vasudevan, Minmini	04:23
Total length:			23:52

The movie was dubbed into Telugu as Rowdy Bullodu and lyrics were written by Vennelakanti

No.	Title	Singer(s)	Length
1.	"Veede Chinnodu"	S. P. Balasubrahmanyam, S. P. Sailaja
2.	"Ee Taluku Chilaka"	Mano, K. S. Chitra
3.	"Are Tholu Kodi Kootha"	S. P. Balasubrahmanyam, K. S. Chitra
4.	"Yedukondallu Yekkeamu"	S. P. Sailaja, Mano

== Reception ==
Maharasan was released on 5 March 1993. Ayyappa Prasad of The Indian Express wrote that the film "has may entertaining portions and would do well commercially. Gopu Babu's dialogues are straight for the front-benches". K. Vijiyan of New Straits Times wrote, "You are going to be disappointed if you go to see this movie expecting something excellent like Devar Magan. Go and see it if you are a big fan of Kamal and in the mood for some light-hearted comedy." R. P. R. of Kalki praised Ilaiyaraaja's music and the humorous dialogues of Gopu-Babu but questioned why the makers needed Haasan for a role which is usually done by comedians.

== Box office ==
As per Rangarajan's interview published in Dina Thanthi's Varalaatru Chuvadugal (Thiraippada Varalaaru 951), Maharasan was a very profitable venture for him and helped him recover from his debts. Earlier, the director had mortgaged his property after the failure of his previous film. From the revenue earned through Maharasan, he was able to pay off his debts and repurchase his home. In gratitude, Rangarajan named his house as "Kamal Illam".
