= Kalyanaraman (1979 film) =

1979 film by G. N. Rangarajan

- Theatrical release poster
- Directed by: G. N. Rangarajan
- Written by: Panchu Arunachalam
- Produced by: Meena Panchu Arunachalam
- Starring: Kamal Haasan; Sridevi
- Cinematography: N. K. Viswanathan
- Edited by: K. R. Ramalingam
- Music by: Ilaiyaraaja
- Production company: P. A. Art Productions
- Release date: 6 July 1979
- Running time: 134 minutes
- Country: India
- Language: Tamil

Kalyanaraman is a 1979 Indian Tamil-language supernatural comedy film directed by G. N. Rangarajan and written by Panchu Arunachalam. The film stars Kamal Haasan and Sridevi, while V. K. Ramasamy, Major Sundarrajan, Thengai Srinivasan, V. S. Raghavan, Senthamarai, Pushpalatha, Manorama and Master Japan Kuppu play supporting roles. It revolves around Kalyanam, a tea estate owner's son who is duped and murdered by a gang trying to seize the property. Kalyanam lives on as a ghost and informs his twin brother Raman, who seeks revenge.

Arunachalam initially wanted to make a film starring Haasan and Rajinikanth, and had the actors' dates ready. The actors did not want to appear in a film together, so it was decided to produce one film for each actor; the film starring Haasan became Kalyanaraman. The film is Rangarajan's directorial debut, and was produced by Arunachalam's wife Meena under their banner P. A. Art Productions; it was photographed by N. K. Viswanathan and edited by K. R. Ramalingam. The story was inspired by Idhu Nijama (1948) and Dona Flor and Her Two Husbands (1976).

Kalyanaraman was released on 6 July 1979 and became a commercial success, running in theatres for 140 days. It was remade in Hindi as Ghazab (1982) and in Kannada as Sriramachandra (1992). A sequel titled Japanil Kalyanaraman was released in 1985.

== Plot ==
Kalyanam is the naïve, infantile son of Chinnadurai, a wealthy tea estate owner. Realising his son would not be able to manage the estate or even take care of himself after his death, Chinnadurai tries to get him married but Kalyanam does not like the prospective bride. Kalyanam is in love with Shenbagam, a woman who works on the estate and is the daughter of Chinnadurai's driver Perumal. Along with his pre-teen friend Kuppu, Kalyanam tries to court Shenbagam but she does not reciprocate his feelings.

The manager of the estate is trying to seize Chinnadurai's wealth and property. He conspires with Perumal and the cook Samipillai, and hires a goon to kill Chinnadurai. On his deathbed, Chinnadurai tells Kalyanam he abandoned his first wife Rajalakshmi and Kalyanam's twin brother Raman in Madras, and advises him to go there to evade the malicious employees. Kalyanam reveals this plan to Samipillai, who leaks it to the manager. Samipillai tells Kalyanam he will fetch Raman and Rajalakshmi himself, and hires actors Kittu and Rangamani to pose as them.

Kalyanam overhears the gang gloating on how they duped him and runs to inform the police but the gang corner and murder him. Shenbagam watches the killing and becomes mentally unstable. The gang cuts off the other witness Kuppu's tongue, rendering him mute. The gang try to seize the property but they face difficult legal formalities from the bank. Kalyanam, now a ghost, travels to Madras to locate his brother and mother. He finds Raman and tells him what happened. Rajalakshmi confirms to Raman he had a twin, and he decides to take revenge.

Raman arrives at his late father's estate, and exposes Rangamani and Kittu as frauds. He poses as Kalyanam's ghost and threatens Samipillai, who breaks down, apologises and joins Raman in his crusade. With the help of Kalyanam, Raman restores Shenbagam's sanity, teaches Kuppu to read and write so he can testify. The manager and his gang try to kidnap Rajalakshmi, who had arrived at the estate sometime before, and attack Raman. Kalyanam temporarily enters Raman's body and gives him the power to fight everyone. The manager and his gang are arrested due to Kuppu's testimony. Raman and Shenbagam marry.

== Cast ==
- Kamal Haasan as Kalyanam and Raman
- Sridevi as Shenbagam
- V. K. Ramasamy as Samipillai
- Major Sundarrajan as the estate manager
- Thengai Srinivasan as Kittu
- V. S. Raghavan as Chinnadurai
- Senthamarai as Perumal
- Pushpalatha as Rajalakshmi
- Manorama as Rangamani
- Master Japan Kuppu as Kuppu

== Production ==
The producer-writer Panchu Arunachalam had the dates of Kamal Haasan and Rajinikanth ready for a potential film but the actors did not want to appear in the same film so it was decided Arunachalam would produce one film for each actor; the Rajinikanth film became Aarilirunthu Arubathu Varai, and the Haasan film became Kalyanaraman. Arunachalam initially contemplated having S. P. Muthuraman direct both films but Haasan recommended Muthuraman's assistant G. N. Rangarajan direct Kalyanaraman, making it his directorial debut. Kalyanaraman was written by Arunachalam and produced by his wife Meena under their banner P. A. Art Productions.

The concept of Kalyanaraman was based on that of the films Idhu Nijama (1948) and Dona Flor and Her Two Husbands (1976). Javar Seetharaman who wrote dialogues for Idhu Nijama admitted this. Haasan played twin brothers Kalyanam and Raman. In preparation for the role of Kalyanam, Haasan had his teeth fashioned by G. Janakiraman, a dentist. The cinematographer was N. K. Viswanathan and the film was edited by K. R. Ramalingam. The film was prominently shot at Ooty, while a fight sequence was shot at 300 feet (91 m) high cliff at Coonoor Estate.

== Soundtrack ==
Ilaiyaraaja composed the music for Kalyanaraman and the lyrics were written by Panchu Arunachalam. The song "Kaathal Vanthiruchu" is loosely based on "Lady in Black" by the British band Uriah Heep. "Kathal Deepam" is set in the Carnatic raga known as Natabhairavi, "Ninaithaal Inikkum" is set in Suddha Dhanyasi, and "Malargalil Aadum" is set in Shuddha Saveri. All of the lyrics for the dubbed Telugu version Kalyana Ramudu were written by Rajasri. "Kaathal Vanthiruchu" was remixed for the film Vallavan (2006), by Ilaiyaraaja's son Yuvan Shankar Raja.

Tamil
| No. | Title | Singer(s) | Length |
|---|---|---|---|
| 1. | "Kathal Deepam" | Malaysia Vasudevan | 4:15 |
| 2. | "Ninaithaal Inikkum" | S. Janaki | 4:48 |
| 3. | "Kaathal Vanthiruchu" | Malaysia Vasudevan | 4:17 |
| 4. | "Malargalil Aadum" | S. P. Sailaja | 4:39 |
| Total length: | | | 17:59 |

Telugu
| No. | Title | Singer(s) | Length |
|---|---|---|---|
| 1. | "Nene Neeku Pranam" | S. P. Balasubrahmanyam |
| 2. | "Manasunarege" | P. Susheela |
| 3. | "Neeke Manasu Ichaa" | S. P. Balasubrahmanyam |
| 4. | "Edo Ragam" | S. Janaki |

== Release ==
Kalyanaraman was released on 6 July 1979. The film was a commercial success and ran in theatres for 140 days. In April 1980, when Doordarshan Kendra Madras announced it would telecast Kalyanaraman, many people, particularly students, sent them letters asking them not to telecast the film during the examination season. One person telephoned Doordarshan Kendra and announced four bombs had been placed inside the building. The film was telecast according to schedule and the bomb threat was discovered to be a hoax.

== Critical reception ==
Ananda Vikatan rated the film 57 out of 100, and in particular praised Haasan's performance, Viswanathan's cinematography and Rangarajan's direction. Piousji, writing for the magazine Sunday, said; "As the dim-wit Kalyanam, [Kamal Haasan] was superb". Kaushikan, writing for Kalki, appreciated the film for its story and the cast performances. Anna appreciated Rangarajan's direction and said Haasan was well utilised, calling Kalyanaraman a worthy entertainer.

== Legacy ==
Following the success of Kalyanaraman, Rangarajan directed Haasan in four more films; Meendum Kokila (1981), Kadal Meengal (1981), Ellam Inba Mayyam (1981) and Maharasan (1992). According to film historian G. Dhananjayan, Kalyanaraman established the comedy horror genre in Tamil cinema. In 1982, the film was remade in Hindi as Ghazab, and in 1992 in Kannada as Sriramachandra. Six years after the release of Kalyanaraman, a sequel titled Japanil Kalyanaraman was made in 1985; it was the first sequel in Tamil cinema.

== Bibliography ==
- Dhananjayan, G. (2011). The Best of Tamil Cinema, 1931 to 2010: 1977–2010. Galatta Media. ISBN 978-81-921043-0-0.
- Sundararaman (2007) [2005]. Raga Chintamani: A Guide to Carnatic Ragas Through Tamil Film Music (2nd ed.). Chennai: Pichhamal Chintamani. OCLC 295034757.
