= Ninaithale Inikkum (2009 film) =

- Theatrical release poster
- Directed by: G. N. R. Kumaravelan
- Screenplay by: G. N. R. Kumaravelan
- Story by: James Albert
- Based on: Classmates (Malayalam)
- Starring: Prithviraj Sukumaran; Shakthi Vasu; Karthik Kumar; Priyamani; Anuja Iyer; Vishnupriyan
- Cinematography: Balasubramaniem
- Edited by: A. Sreekar Prasad
- Music by: Vijay Antony
- Production company: Gemini Film Circuit
- Distributed by: Sun Pictures
- Release date: 4 September 2009
- Country: India
- Language: Tamil

Ninaithale Inikkum (transl. Sweet Memories) is a 2009 Indian Tamil-language coming of age drama film directed by G. N. R. Kumaravelan in his directorial debut. It is the Tamil remake of the 2006 Malayalam film Classmates. The film was produced by Gemini Film Circuit and distributed by Sun Pictures. Prithviraj Sukumaran reprises his role from the original film, starring alongside Shakthi Vasu, Priyamani, Karthik Kumar, Anuja Iyer, and Vishnupriyan. The soundtrack was composed by Vijay Antony with cinematography handled by Balasubramaniem and editing by A. Sreekar Prasad.

Ninaithale Inikkum was released on 4 September 2009 and became a commercial success. The film's title was taken from a 1979 Tamil film.

== Plot ==
Shivaram returns to college to reunite with his friends. With his eyes sparkling with nostalgia, he takes a trip down memory lane, reminiscing about his college days, which form the crux of the story.

Shiva is an energetic, enthusiastic college student. He is short-tempered, getting easily provoked by the rich, proud Vasu and his arrogance, leading to many fights between them. Shakthi often stops their fights and strives to bring Shiva and Vasu together on friendly terms, but in vain. Shiva, Shakthi, and their faithful friend Bala stay together through thick and thin and are always ready to voice their views on behalf of those in the college hostel.

Shakthi's father Pazhaniyappan often visits his son at the hostel and is seen as a father to all of Shakthi's friends. Meera, the daughter of an MLA, nurtures a soft corner for Shiva. She is brave enough to stand up to him and pacify him when he throws unnecessary tantrums. Shalee, Meera's friend, is a shy, reserved Muslim girl from an orthodox family. She is often preoccupied with her own thoughts. Karthik is a showoff who tries to humiliate Shiva and Shakthi but ends up making a fool of himself.

At the reunion, the friends are happy to see each other after eight years. However, they are burdened by the tragic death of Shakthi; Shiva seems most affected of all. All seems well until Shiva is found almost strangled to death. Everyone suspects Vasu, though Shakthi's father discovers that Shalee actually attempted the murder.

A flashback reveals that Shakthi and Shalee were in love. Shalee revealed that Shiva, who was running away from the police after breaking into an election booth, accidentally killed Shakthi (mistaking him for someone else) with chloroform, as the latter suffered from asthma. Shalee is upset that Shakthi's father prevented her from taking revenge against Shiva.

Shiva recovers and seeks forgiveness from Pazhaniyappan. Pazhaniyappan forgives Shiva and asks him to marry Meera, who has been waiting for him for those eight years. Vasu also apologizes to Shiva for all of his antics in college. Shakthi's parents adopt Shalee, whose family has died, and decide to take her in as their own. The film ends as Shalee bids farewell to her friends and to the image of Shakthi, forever present on the college campus.

The film ends with the message: "Never forget the sweet memories that happened in college."

== Cast ==
- Prithviraj Sukumaran as Shivaram Nair IAS
- Shakthi Vasu as Shakthi Pazhaniyappan
- Karthik Kumar as Vasu
- Priyamani as Meera
- Anuja Iyer as Shalee
- Vishnupriyan as Bala
- K. Bhagyaraj as Pazhaniyappan, Sakthi's father
- Lollu Sabha Jeeva as Karthik
- Ilavarasu as Sethuraman, hostel warden
- Manobala as Lecturer
- Boys Rajan as Principal Ramachandran
- Bava Lakshmanan as Subramani, cook
- Anjali Devi as Sakthi's mother
- Jayashree as Shalini's friend
- Kausha Rach in a Special Appearance in Song "Sexy Lady"

== Production ==
Writer G. N. Rangarajan's son G. N. R. Kumaravelan ventured into direction with this Tamil film. Kumaravelan modified the screenplay from the Malayalam original.

== Soundtrack ==
The soundtrack was composed by Vijay Antony. The song "Azhaghai Pookuthe" is based on Keeravani raga.

Track listing
No.	Title	Lyrics	Singer(s)	Length
1.	"Azhagaai Pookkuthey"	Kalai Kumar	V. V. Prasanna, Janaki Iyer	4:58
2.	"Pia.. Pia.."	Annamalai	Vijay Antony, Dinesh Kanagaratnam	4:16
3.	"Nanbanai Partha"	Annamalai	Benny Dayal	5:05
4.	"Sexy Lady"	Priyan	MK Balaji, Sheba, Maya, Ramya NSK	4:27
5.	"Kalloori"	Sheba	Sheba	1:27
6.	"Allah"	Annamalai	Vijay Antony	4:51
7.	"Naatkal"	Prabha	Vijay Antony, Kaushik	1:39
Total length:				26:43

== Reception ==
A critic from The Hindu wrote that "Kumaravelan’s screenplay bubbles with youthful spirit in the first half while the knots are unreeled in the second". A critic from The New Indian Express wrote that "Though it seems a watered-down version of the Malayalam film, Ninaithale Inikkum does offer a different viewing experience to the Tamil audiences". Critic R. Richard Mahesh wrote that "Finally, Ninaithale Inikkum is a poignant film that has a middling start and gradually brimmed with interesting moments". A critic from Rediff.com wrote that "The Tamil version doesn't exactly pull at your heart-strings like the Malayalam version seems to have done -- but it at least has a plot with all the loose ends tied up".
