= James Albert =

James Albert may refer to:

- James S. Albert, professor of biology
- James Albert (screenwriter), Indian script writer and director
