= Yuvan Yuvathi =

- Directed by: G. N. R. Kumaravelan
- Written by: S. Ramakrishnan (Story; Dialogues)
- Screenplay by: G. N. R. Kumaravelan
- Produced by: Baija Tom; Dr. V. Rama Doss
- Starring: Bharath; Rima Kallingal; Santhanam; Sampath Raj
- Cinematography: Gopi Jagadeeswaran
- Edited by: Prabaahar
- Music by: Vijay Antony
- Production company: Ram Pictures
- Distributed by: Reliance Entertainment
- Release date: 26 August 2011
- Country: India
- Language: Tamil
- Budget: ₹ 14crores
- Box office: ₹ 10crores

Yuvan Yuvathi (transl. Male Youth, Female Youth) is a 2011 Indian Tamil-language romance film, written and directed by G. N. R. Kumaravelan. It stars Bharath and Rima Kallingal in the lead roles. The film released on 26 August 2011. It received generally mixed reviews and became an average success at the Tamil Nadu box office. The film was dubbed in Telugu as Dear and in Hindi as Dildaar Ashique.

== Plot ==
Kathirvel Murugan is a software engineer in Chennai. He shares his room with friend Sakkarai. Kathir hails from Usilampatti but wants to project himself as city-bred, and his ambition is to settle in the USA. Kathir's father Sevaka Pandian opposes his son's attitude. An influential local chieftain, he is against inter-caste marriage and love. Kathir meets Nisha, who too wants to go abroad. Nisha loses her passport, and Kathir helps her find it. Slowly, he falls for her. Meanwhile, Sevaka Pandian arranges his son's wedding with a High Court judge's daughter Thangameena. In the meantime, Kathir and Nisha get their visa and get ready to leave together for the USA.

Kathir thinks he has escaped from his marriage, and when he wants to propose to Nisha, he gets a rude shock. She informs him that she is going to the USA for her marriage. In the meantime, Sevaka Pandian learns of their relationship and kidnaps her. Afterwards, Kathir also learns about it and saves Nisha, but her marriage is stopped. After ten months, they meet in the same country again. Kathir does not want to see her, but his mind changes, and he tries to make Nisha love him. At last, they both fall in love with each other. Now they return to their hometown for their marriage. Initially, Sevaka Pandian does not allow it, but later, Kathir convinces him and marries Nisha.

== Cast ==
- Bharath as Kathirvel Murugan
- Rima Kallingal as Nisha
- Santhanam as Sakkarai
- Sampath Raj as Sevaka Pandian Thevar
- Anuja Iyer as Thangameena
- Sathyan as Chacha
- Devadarshini as Anu
- Five Star Krishna as Krishna
- Shobana as Sakkarai's wife
- Swaminathan as Sakkarai's father
- T. P. Gajendran as Thangameena's father
- Mayilsamy as Auto Driver
- Madan Bob as Alexpandian
- Sujatha Sivakumar as Sevakapandian's wife
- Hemalatha as Deivanai
- Muthukaalai as Maari
- Shakthi Vasudevan as Saravanan (guest appearance)

== Soundtrack ==
Yuvan Yuvathi

Soundtrack album by Vijay Antony
- Released: 1 July 2011
- Recorded: 2010
- Genre: Feature film soundtrack
- Label: Think Music
- Producer: Vijay Antony

Vijay Antony chronology
Sattapadi Kutram (2011)	Yuvan Yuvathi (2011)	Vedi (2011)

The soundtrack, composed by Vijay Antony, released on 1 July 2011. The album features 7 tracks with lyrics by Annamalai, Kalai Kumar and Priyan.

Track list
No.	Title	Lyrics	Singer(s)	Length
1.	"Oh My Angel"	Annamalai	Vijay Antony	04:40
2.	"Mayakka Oosi"	Kalai Kumar	Vijay Prakash, Srimathumitha	05:20
3.	"24 Hours"	Annamalai	Haricharan	05:32
4.	"Kola Kuthu"	Annamalai	Vijay Antony, Sneha, Lock up (Malaysia)	04:03
5.	"Un Kannai Partha Piragu"	Priyan	Karthik, Ramya NSK	05:31
6.	"Kadalai Poduran"	Annamalai	Krishnan Mahesan	02:04
7.	"Ullangai"	Annamalai	Sangeetha Rajeshwaran	04:39

== Critical reception ==
Malathi Rangarajan from The Hindu stated, "A predictable and enjoyable finish to a love story that sparkles with the energy of youth!". A critic from The New Indian Express wrote, "An average entertainer, Yuvan Yuvathi may not bore you. But it doesn’t have that fizz to keep one completely engrossed in the happenings." Behindwoods gave the film 2/5 stars and wrote, "In all, a film that could have worked well with its positive features, goes south due to the week screenplay, narration and the badly conceived climax."
