= Sriramachandra =

- VCD cover
- Directed by: D. Rajendra Babu
- Written by: Upendra; R. Rajashekhar (dialogues)
- Screenplay by: D. Rajendra Babu
- Story by: Panchu Arunachalam
- Produced by: P. Dhanaraj
- Starring: Ravichandran; Mohini; Srinath; Vajramuni
- Cinematography: Kabir Lal
- Edited by: K. Balu
- Music by: Hamsalekha
- Release date: 1 December 1992
- Running time: 127 minutes
- Country: India
- Language: Kannada

Sriramachandra is a 1992 Indian Kannada-language film supernatural comedy film, directed by D. Rajendra Babu and produced by P. Dhanraj. The film stars Ravichandran in dual roles, along with Mohini, Vajramuni and Srinath amongst others. The music and lyrics were composed by Hamsalekha. The film is a remake of the Tamil film Kalyanaraman (1979), and emerged a success.

== Plot ==
Srirama and Chandra are twin brothers, born to Srinath and Rajalakshmi. Over a family difference, the couple splits. Srirama lives with his father in the Kalasa (Chikmagalur district) tea estate, while Chandra is raised by his mother in Bangalore City.

Srirama is born as an innocent and immature boy, whose life revolves around his father and his friend Geetha, whom he intends to marry. However, motivated by greed, Srinath's manager Vajramuni hatches a successful plan to murder him. The plot leaves Srirama orphaned and the sole property owner. Srirama, without a knowledge in accounts, gets cheated regularly by his manager.

Before dying, Srirama's father reveals the secret about his mother and twin brother staying in Bangalore. Knowing this, the manager presents a couple of actors as Srirama's mother and brother, and Srirama is initially convinced. However, Srirama learns about the gang's plan and runs away to inform the police. En route, he gets killed by falling off a cliff, making Geetha lose her consciousness and become mentally unstable.

The rest of the plot concerns Srirama returning as a ghost, and informing his twin brother about the gang's schemes. And how the brothers are going to defeat the manager and the others who know each and everything about Srirama's property, business, how Chandra will save srirama and help Geetha become normal again.

== Cast ==
- Ravichandran as Srirama and Chandra
- Mohini as Geetha
- Srinath
- Vajramuni as Estate manager
- Dheerendra Gopal as Bhatta
- Mukhyamantri Chandru as the actor arranged by the manager to act as Chandra before Shrirama
- Umashree as an actress arranged by the manager to act as Rajalakshmi
- Sumithra as Rajalakshmi
- Rajanand as Estate Jeep driver
- Shivaram
- Krishne Gowda as Estate Lawyer
- Mafia Shashi as lingappa
- Bank Suresh
- Tiger Juneja
- Stunt Devu

== Soundtrack ==
Hamsalekha composed and wrote all songs of the film.

Title	Singer(s)
"Gaganadali Maleya Dina"	Mano, K. S. Chithra
"Enaayitu Nanageedina"	S. P. Balasubrahmanyam, K. S. Chithra
"Bhootavilla Pishachiyilla"	S. P. Balasubrahmanyam, Mano
"Sundari Sundari"	S. P. Balasubrahmanyam
"Sundari Sundari" (sad version)	S. P. Balasubrahmanyam
