= Rusi (film) =

- Directed by: Manamohan
- Screenplay by: Vennira Aadai Moorthy
- Produced by: S. S. Dhanapalan; Subha Chokkalingam
- Starring: Mohan; Swapna
- Cinematography: R. N. K. Prasad
- Music by: Gangai Amaran
- Production company: Subbravalle Films
- Release date: 10 August 1984
- Country: India
- Language: Tamil

Rusi (transl. Entertainment) is a 1984 Indian Tamil-language film directed by Manamohan, starring Mohan and Swapna. It was released on 10 August 1984.

== Cast ==
- Mohan
- Swapna
- Srikanth

== Soundtrack ==
The music was composed by Gangai Amaran.

Track listing
No.	Title	Lyrics	Singer(s)	Length
1.	"Etho Oru Vekam"	Gangai Amaran	P. Susheela
2.	"Vaanam Illamal"	Vaali	Malaysia Vasudevan, S. P. Sailaja
3.	"Kallum Oru Kaniyakalam"	Vaali	S. Janaki and chorus
4.	"Poraaduthe Idhayam"	Na. Kamarasan	Malaysia Vasudevan
