= Sir... I Love You =

- Directed by: G. N. Rangarajan
- Screenplay by: G. N. Rangarajan
- Story by: Cumbum Durai
- Produced by: R. Jayanthi
- Starring: Sivakumar; Ranjini
- Cinematography: D. D. Prasad
- Edited by: K. R. Ramalingam
- Music by: Ilaiyaraaja
- Production company: Jegan Mohini Films
- Release date: 14 February 1991
- Running time: 125 minutes
- Country: India
- Language: Tamil

Sir... I Love You is a 1991 Indian Tamil-language film directed by G. N. Rangarajan. The film stars Sivakumar and Ranjini. It was released on 14 February 1991. This was Ranjini's final Tamil film.

== Cast ==
- Sivakumar as Arun
- Ranjini as Lalitha
- Jaishankar as Ramanathan, Lalitha's father
- Lakshmi as Veni, Lalitha's mother
- S. S. Chandran
- T. S. Raghavendra
- Charuhasan as Namasivayam
- Loose Mohan
- Soorya
- Varalakshmi as Arun's mother
- Jegan as Jegan

== Soundtrack ==
The music was composed by Ilaiyaraaja.

Track listing
No.	Title	Lyrics	Singer(s)	Length
1.	"Ingai Iraivan"	Kuruvikkarambai Shanmugam	Mano, P. Susheela	4:20
2.	"Vaanambadi"	Na. Kamarasan	K. S. Chithra	4:34
3.	"Kannal Kadhal"	Kuruvikkarambai Shanmugam	Malaysia Vasudevan	2:36
4.	"Vaathiyaare"	Na. Kamarasan	K. S. Chithra	4:23
5.	"Ae Indhira Puthirana"	Na. Kamarasan	Malaysia Vasudevan, S. P. Sailaja	4:13
Total length:				20:06

== Reception ==
Sundarji of Kalki called Sivakumar's character a "readymade" role, noting that despite so many minor flaws, the film was barely able to escape them by a hairline.
