= Ghazab =

- Poster
- Directed by: C. P. Dixit
- Screenplay by: S. M. Abbas
- Story by: Panchu Arunachalam
- Produced by: N. N. Sippy
- Starring: Dharmendra; Rekha
- Music by: Laxmikant–Pyarelal
- Release date: 28 May 1982
- Country: India
- Language: Hindi
- Budget: ₹est.20 million
- Box office: ₹70 million

Ghazab (transl. Amazing) is a 1982 Indian Hindi-language action comedy-drama film starring Dharmendra and Rekha. The film was a remake of the Tamil film Kalyanaraman. The movie was a 'Hit' and the performance of Dharmendra was critically acclaimed.

== Cast ==
- Dharmendra as Ajay "Munna" / Vijay (Double Role)
- Rekha as Jamuna
- Ranjeet as Arjun Singh
- Madan Puri as Jatashankar
- Aruna Irani as Kaveri
- Jagdeep as Narmada
- Shreeram Lagoo as Thakur
- Seema Deo as Ajay and Vijay's mother
- Krishan Dhawan as Jamuna's uncle
- Sharat Saxena as Arjun's henchman
- Praveen Kumar as Henchman

== Soundtrack ==
Song	Singer
"Ghar Se Chali Thi Main Ek Din Sham Ko Jane Kis Kaam Ko"	Kishore Kumar, Lata Mangeshkar
"Aage Se Dekho, Peechhe Se Dekho, Upar Se Dekho, Neeche Se Dekho"	Kishore Kumar, Amit Kumar
"Jaan-E-Man Jaan-E-Jigar" - 1	Amit Kumar
"Jaan-E-Man Jaan-E-Jigar" - 2	Amit Kumar
"Ae Hawa Yeh Bata"	Lata Mangeshkar
