= Muthu Engal Sothu =

- Poster
- Directed by: G. N. Rangarajan
- Screenplay by: G. N. Rangarajan
- Produced by: G. N. Rangarajan
- Starring: Prabhu; Radha
- Cinematography: D. D. Prasath
- Edited by: K. R. Ramalingam
- Music by: Ilaiyaraaja
- Production company: Kumara Vel Films
- Release date: 9 December 1983
- Country: India
- Language: Tamil

Muthu Engal Sothu (transl. Muthu is our wealth) is a 1983 Indian Tamil-language film directed by G. N. Rangarajan, starring Prabhu and Radha. It was released on 9 December 1983.

== Plot ==
Muthu is a trusted servant of a rich man who unknown to Muthu is his father.

== Cast ==
- Prabhu as Muthu
- Radha
- Rajeev
- Venu Arvind
- Geetha
- K. A. Thangavelu
- Manorama
- Anuradha
- Vanitha
- Poornam Viswanathan as Muthu's father
- S. N. Parvathy
- Thengai Srinivasan
- Sivachandran

== Production ==
Muthu Engal Sothu is the feature film debut of Venu Arvind.

== Soundtrack ==
Soundtrack was composed by Ilaiyaraaja.

Song	Singers	Lyrics
"Yaararu"	Malaysia Vasudevan, S. Janaki	Vaali
"Yaar Yaaru"	P. Susheela, S. Janaki, B.S. Sashirekha	Vaali
"Naan Unthan"	S. P. Sailaja	Kalaivanan Kannadasan
"Nee Enna"	S. Janaki, Malaysia Vasudevan	Vairamuthu

== Reception ==
Jayamanmadhan of Kalki found the plot similar to Padikkadha Medhai (1960) and panned the vulgar dialogues of Panchu Arunachalam and concluded did Rangarajan had to produce and direct this film with such cheap material.
