= Haridas (2013 film) =

2013 Indian film by G. N. R. Kumaravelan

- Theatrical release poster
- Directed by: G. N. R. Kumaravelan
- Written by: A. R. Venkatesh (Dialogue)
- Screenplay by: G. N. R. Kumaravelan
- Story by: G. N. R. Kumaravelan
- Produced by: V. Ramadoss
- Starring: Kishore; Sneha; Prithviraj Das; Soori; Pradeep Rawat
- Cinematography: R. Rathnavelu
- Edited by: Raja Mohammad
- Music by: Vijay Antony
- Production company: DR V RAM Production Private Limited
- Distributed by: Ram Pictures
- Release date: 22 February 2013
- Running time: 146 minutes
- Country: India
- Language: Tamil

Haridas is a 2013 Indian Tamil-language action drama film written and directed by G. N. R. Kumaravelan starring Kishore and Sneha in the lead roles with Prithviraj Das as the title character. Musical score is by Vijay Antony. It was released on 22 February 2013 to extremely positive reviews and was moderately successful at the box office. The movie was screened at 11th Chennai International Film Festival where it won 2 awards.

== Plot ==
Sivadas is the daring cop who gets ruthless against the local goon Aadhi and is just miles away from nabbing the crook. He has a driver named Kandasamy. However, he is forced to leave the force for a while to take care of his autistic son, Haridas because of an unfortunate matter. With much difficulty, he enrolls Haridas in a normal school where Amudhavalli is a teacher specialized to deal with special children.

Kishore dwells into the character of Sivadas, a sorry father for not sparing time to his family when it mattered most and tries to understand his son's problem step by step.

== Cast ==
- Kishore as Sivadas
- Sneha as Amudhavalli
- Prithviraj Das as Haridas
- Soori as Kandasamy
- Pradeep Rawat as Aadhi
- Yugi Sethu as Ravi
- Raj Kapoor as P. T. Coach
- Nitish Veera as Ramesh
- P V Chandramoulli as Mouli
- Varadharajalu as Varadharajan
- Sathyajith as the police commissioner
- O. A. K. Sundar as selection committee member
- Vinod Sagar as the father of a child, whose chain is pulled by Haridas.

== Production ==
=== Casting ===
It was announced in 2012 that Kishore will play a lead. The shooting started from 10 March 2012 and Sneha was confirmed for the role.

=== Filming ===
Filming started from 10 March 2012 in Chennai, and Kumaravelan revealed on 12 March 2012 that he is going to croon a song and the movie contains only three songs. The unit of Haridas had a narrow escape as their boat capsized in the high seas of Dhanushkodi, during a shoot on 27 June 2012. After shooting in the sea, one of the boats that they were traveling capsized due to the high tide around the area. Kumaravela did not know how to swim, so he was forced to hold on to the boat for a while till some local fishermen rescued them.

== Soundtrack ==
Haridas

Soundtrack album Haridas by Vijay Antony
- Released: 26 November 2012
- Recorded: 2012
- Genre: Film soundtrack
- Language: Tamil
- Label: Gemini Audio
- Producer: Vijay Antony

Vijay Antony chronology
Sattam Oru Iruttarai (2012)	Haridas (2012)	Kathai Thiraikathai Vasanam Iyakkam (2014)

The music was composed by Vijay Antony in his third collaboration with Kumaravelan. The music was launched by director Bala and received by actor Vikram on 26 November 2012. The film has three songs, apart from a theme song. Kumaravelan said, "There’s a song about cops in this film. Vijay Antony scored the music for the song in just two days. There is also an inspirational song sung by Shankar Mahadevan." The song "Vaazhkaiye" is based on the 80s pop song "Sweet Dreams (Are Made of This)" by Eurythmics.

All lyrics are written by Annamalai, except where noted. (Note: The lyric "Everybody..." was reused from "Sweet Dreams".)

No.	Title	Singer(s)	Length
1.	"Annaiyin"	Shankar Mahadevan
2.	"Police"	Prabhu Pandala
3.	"Vaazhkaiye"	Maalavika Manoj, GNR Kumar
4.	"Vellakuthira"	Rockstar Ramani Ammal

== Release ==
The film was released on 22 February 2013 along with Ameerin Aadhi Bhagavan to average collections and at number 5 in the Chennai box office. Over the coming weeks, the collection improved and it moved to number 4 at the box office. It completed 50 days run at limited centers in Chennai and at the end of the theatrical run, it did mediocre business.

== Critical reception ==
The movie opened to positive reviews. A critic from Sify rated the movie as "Haridas makes for absolutely compelling viewing. It tugs at your heartstrings, and urges you to introspect and makes you look at children with disability badly for it!". A critic from Yahoo rated the movie as "Emotionally uplifting film and it is an effort that is sure to attract lot of attention from the masses." The Hindu rated the movie as "Story of action and emotions. Watch Haridas. He deserves to be supported."

== Awards ==
1. Second Best Film - 11th Chennai International Film Festival
2. Special Jury Award For Individual Excellence to Prithviraj Das - 11th Chennai International Film Festival
