= Rani Theni =

- Theatrical release poster
- Directed by: G. N. Rangarajan
- Screenplay by: G. N. Rangarajan
- Story by: Silakkalam Purushottaman
- Produced by: G. N. Rangarajan
- Starring: Deepan Chakravarthy; Mahalakshmi; Vanitha Krishnachandran; Sivachandran
- Cinematography: N. K. Viswanathan
- Edited by: K. R. Ramalingham
- Music by: Ilaiyaraaja
- Production company: Parameswari Enterprises
- Release date: 9 October 1982
- Country: India
- Language: Tamil

Rani Theni (transl. Queen bee) is a 1982 Tamil language film directed by G. N. Rangarajan, starring Kamal Haasan in an extended guest role. The film stars playback singer Deepan Chakravarthy, the son of Trichi Loganathan, a veteran playback singer in his first leading role. The female leads are played by Mahalakshmi / Shree and Vanitha Krishnachandran.

Kamal Haasan plays a comedy role with no connection with the main story and interacts only in one scene with the main villain Sivachandran, who plays the role of a playboy and Casanova; his character is killed by the heroine. The film was a remake of the Telugu film Kukka Katuku Cheppu Debba.

== Plot ==
Sekhar spends time playing the guitar and flirting with girls. Parvati is the daughter of his neighbor. Sekhar flirts with a girl who repairs his guitar and teaches him how to play it. He also acts as if he loves Rukmini, who is the daughter of Raghavaiah. Parvati hates Sekhar and his behavior and always tries to avoid him. Selvam and his family like Parvati and fix an engagement with her family. Out of curiosity to meet Parvati, Selvam comes to her home on some reasons but unable to directly talk to her, writes a letter requesting her to come and meet him in backyard at night if she loves him, else he will break the engagement. Parvati comes to meet him, where she is seduced. This continues for a second night too, but Parvati is shocked when Selvam throws a torch light on her and she finds herself in the arms of Sekhar. Selvam is heart broken and leaves her.

== Cast ==
- Mahalakshmi as Parvathi
- Deepan Chakravarthy as Selvam
- Sivachandran as Sekar
- Vanitha Krishnachandran as Kanagam
- Charuhasan
- Thengai Srinivasan as Thulasilingum
- Kamal Haasan as Miller (Guest appearance)
- Y. G. Mahendran (Guest appearance)
- T. K. S. Natarajan

== Production ==
Rani Theni was produced and directed by G. N. Rangarajan. After the film was completed, many distributors refused to buy the film due to lack of star value. Kamal Haasan who learned of this suggested to Rangarajan that he will do a cameo which will appear throughout the film and completed his portions within three days. After shooting scenes with Haasan, Rangarajan was able to sell his film to distributors.

== Soundtrack ==
Soundtrack was composed by Ilaiyaraaja.

| Song | Singers | Lyrics |
|---|---|---|
| "Enna Solli Naan Ezhutha" | P. Susheela | S. N. Ravi |
| "Samy Sambo Saranam" | Malaysia Vasudevan | Gangai Amaran |
| "Ramanukke Seethai" | S. Janaki, Deepan Chakravarthy | Panchu Arunachalam |
| "Koodi Vantha Megam" | Malaysia Vasudevan | Vairamuthu |

== Release and reception ==
According to Rangarajan, though Rani Theni failed at the box office, he was able to recover the investment. Thiraignani of Kalki felt Mahalakshmi's acting and Deepan Chakarvarthy's characterisation could have been better but praised Charuhasan's acting and Viswanathan's cinematography and concluded saying half the story, the rest is Haasan.
