= Paanjajanyam =

Paanjajanyam (1982)
- Directed by: K. G. Rajasekharan
- Screenplay by: Ravi Vilangal
- Produced by: Thodupuzha S. R. Swamy & M. K. Dathan for Drishyachithra
- Starring: Prem Nazir, Swapna, Nithya, Sathar, Balan K. Nair, Jose Prakash Kaviyoor Ponnamma etc.
- Cinematography: T. V. Kumar
- Edited by: V. P. Krishnan
- Music by: Shankar–Ganesh
- Release date: 27 August 1982
- Country: India
- Language: Malayalam

Paanjajanyam is a 1982 Indian Malayalam-language film, directed by K. G. Rajasekharan. The film stars Prem Nazir, Swapna, Kaviyoor Ponnamma and P. C. George. The film has musical score by Shankar–Ganesh.

== Cast ==
- Prem Nazir as Venu
- Swapna
- Kaviyoor Ponnamma as Lakshmidevi
- P. C. George
- Hari
- Jose Prakash
- Alummoodan
- Balan K. Nair as Balan
- Nithya
- P. R. Varalakshmi
- Beena Kumbalangi

== Soundtrack ==
The music was composed by Shankar–Ganesh with lyrics by Mankombu Gopalakrishnan.

No.	Song	Singers	Lyrics	Length (m:ss)
1	"Aaalekkandaal Paavam"	P. Jayachandran, Vani Jairam, Renuka	Mankombu Gopalakrishnan	
2	"Maarkazhiyile Manju"	Unni Menon	Mankombu Gopalakrishnan	
3	"Vasantha Manjimakal"	K. J. Yesudas, Ambili	Mankombu Gopalakrishnan	
4	"Vishu Sankramam"	Unni Menon, Ambili, K. P. Brahmanandan, Chorus	Mankombu Gopalakrishnan	
