= Aduthathu Albert =

1985 film

- Theatrical release poster
- Directed by: G. N. Rangarajan
- Screenplay by: G. N. Rangarajan
- Story by: Kasthuri Rangan
- Produced by: G. N. Rangarajan
- Starring: Prabhu; Urvashi
- Cinematography: D. D. Prasanth
- Edited by: K. R. Ramalingam
- Music by: Ilaiyaraaja
- Production company: Kumaravel Films
- Release date: 12 July 1985
- Running time: 120 minutes
- Country: India
- Language: Tamil

Aduthathu Albert (transl. Albert, the neighbour) is a 1985 Indian Tamil-language film produced and directed by G. N. Rangarajan. The film stars Prabhu and Urvashi. It was released on 12 July 1985, and failed at the box office.

== Plot ==
Albert, a Christian boy, hates Radha, a Brahmin girl. Mary, Albert's sister, and Raja, Radha's brother are in love. Albert then decides to help the lovers, but the lovers later commit suicide. Albert and Radha begin to scare their family to teach them a lesson, but they eventually fall in love.

== Cast ==
- Prabhu as Albert
- Urvashi as Radha
- Major Sundarrajan as Krishnamachari
- Senthamarai as Alexander, Albert's father
- Y. G. Mahendran as Baasha
- Thengai Srinivasan as Raangachari
- Isari Velan as Solomon
- Charuhasan as Father Daniel
- Poornima Bhagyaraj as Paanchali

== Production ==
A karate fight scene featuring Prabhu and other karate students were shot at Ooty.

== Soundtrack ==
The soundtrack was composed by Ilaiyaraaja. The song "Va Va Mysooru" attained popularity.

Song	Singer(s)	Lyrics	Duration
'Aadidu Peyygaley'	Vani Jairam, Malaysia Vasudevan, S. Janaki, Kovai Soundararajan	Gangai Amaran	4:58
'Hey Indhira'	S. P. Sailaja, Malaysia Vasudevan	Kadhal Mathi	4:28
'Idhayame'	Malaysia Vasudevan, S. Janaki	Ponnaruvi	4:32
'Sondhangale'	Malaysia Vasudevan	Vairamuthu	4:41
'Va Va Mysooru'	Ramesh, S. Janaki, Malaysia Vasudevan	Vaali	4:27

== Release and reception ==
Aduthathu Albert was released on 12 July 1985. Prior to release, the film faced issues with the censor board due to its theme of cross religion romance. Jayamanmadhan of Kalki felt many of the scenes from the film gave the impression of watching an old film on television. The film was a box office failure.
