= Japanil Kalyanaraman =

1985 film by S. P. Muthuraman

- Theatrical release poster
- Directed by: S. P. Muthuraman
- Written by: Panchu Arunachalam
- Produced by: Meena Panchu Arunachalam; Sethu Bhaskaran
- Starring: Kamal Haasan; Radha; Sathyaraj; Master Tinku
- Cinematography: T. S. Vinayagam
- Edited by: R. Vittal; C. Lancy
- Music by: Ilaiyaraaja
- Production company: P. A. Art Productions
- Release date: 11 November 1985
- Country: India
- Language: Tamil

Japanil Kalyanaraman (transl. Kalyanaraman in Japan) is a 1985 Indian Tamil-language romantic comedy film directed by S. P. Muthuraman, starring Kamal Haasan and Radha . A follow-up to Kalyanaraman (1979), it is the first sequel film in Tamil cinema. The film was released on 11 November 1985 and performed poorly at the box office.

== Plot ==
Raman is a journalist who exposes a smuggling and black money racket, which involves the high-profile and his son Narendran, and is about to go public. The magazine is bought by Narendran overnight.

When Raman reveals that he is about to start his own magazine, he is beaten up by Narendran's men. After surviving miraculously, Raman, his son Arun, and the spirit of the now-dead Kalyanaraman, travel to Japan to buy printing equipment and to show Arun around.

In the comedy side plot, Mayilsamy and Muppaathaa win a lucky draw to visit Japan, guided by Munusamy.

Raman meets Radha, who is a waitress in a restaurant, and they gradually fall in love, with the efforts of Kalyanaraman and Arun. Meanwhile, Narendran also travels to Japan to get rid of Raman before he arrives back in India.

The movie ends with Raman helping to arrest Narendran and getting back together with Radha and Arun.

== Cast ==
- Kamal Haasan as Raman and Kalyanam
- Radha as Radha
- Sathyaraj as Narendran
- V. K. Ramasamy as Samikannu
- Major Sundarrajan as Narendran's Father
- Goundamani as Mayilsamy
- Kovai Sarala as Muppatha
- Chitra Lakshmanan as Guide Munusamy
- Master Tinku as Arun
- ISR as Textile showroom salesman
- Nazeem

== Production ==
Japanil Kalyanaraman is a sequel to the 1979 film Kalyanaraman, making that the first Tamil film to have a sequel. The film was predominantly shot in Japan, including Expo 85 exhibition for 15 days and at Hong Kong for seven days. The buck tooth for Master Tinku was tooth designed by Janakiraman, a dentist.

== Soundtrack ==
The music was composed by Ilaiyaraaja.

Track listing
| No. | Title | Lyrics | Singer(s) | Length |
|---|---|---|---|---|
| 1. | "Appappoi Ammammoi" | Vaali | Kamal Haasan | 4:23 |
| 2. | "Chinna Poo" | Vaali | S. Janaki | 4:42 |
| 3. | "Radhe En Radhe" | Vaali | M. Ramesh, S. Janaki | 5:33 |
| 4. | "Vaaya Vaaya" | Vaali | S. P. Balasubrahmanyam | 4:32 |
| 5. | "Kadhal Un Leelaiya" | Vairamuthu | Ilaiyaraaja | 4:24 |
| 6. | "Appappa Thithikkum" | Vairamuthu | S. P. Balasubramanyam | 4:28 |
| 7. | "Theme Music" | | | 2:45 |
| Total length: | | | | 30:47 |

== Reception ==
Japanil Kalyanaraman was released on 11 November 1985. Kalki wrote the team had forgotten to pick up the screenplay while travelling to Japan. The film failed commercially because, according to the director, it "lacked the freshness" of its predecessor.
