= Idhu Nijama =

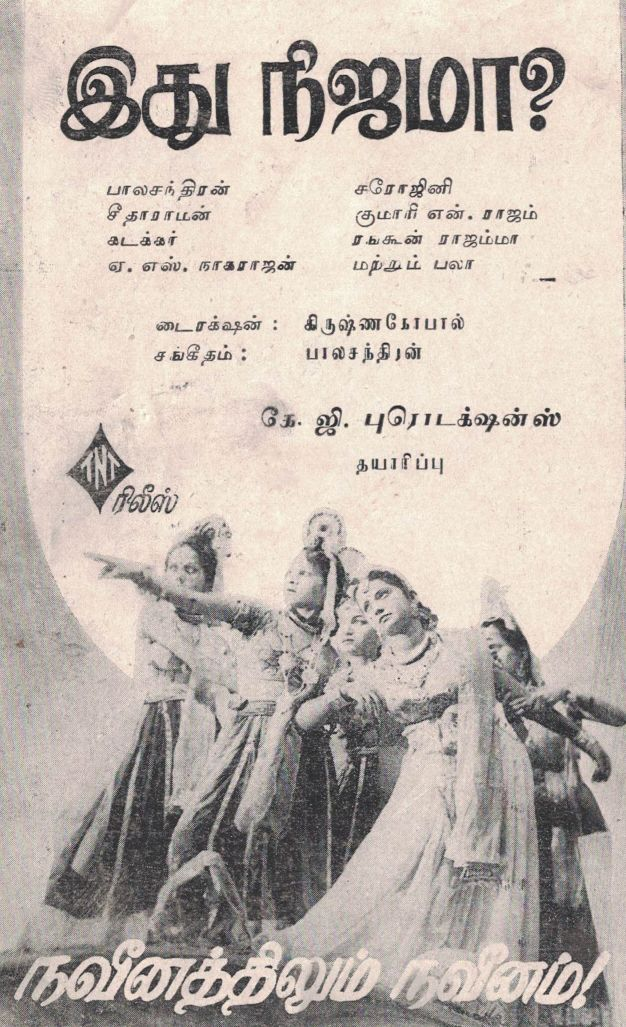
- Film Poster
- Directed by: Krishna Gopal
- Written by: Javar Seetharaman
- Screenplay by: S. Balachander
- Story by: S. Balachander
- Based on: Wonder Man
- Produced by: S. Soundararaja Ayyengar
- Edited by: A. S. Nagarajan
- Music by: S. Balachander
- Production company: Ranjith Studios
- Distributed by: K. G. Productions
- Release date: 6 March 1948
- Country: India
- Language: Tamil

Idhu Nijama (transl. Is This True?) is a 1948 Tamil-language thriller film directed by Krishna Gopal and produced by S. Soundararajan Ayyengar. The film dialogue was written by V. Seetharaman. The film script was written by S. Balachander as well as the music, an asset to the film. The film starred S. Balachander (as twins), Sarojini and Kumari N. Rajam, playing lead, with V. Seetharaman, Manuel, Pattammal and A. S. Nagarajan playing supporting roles. This film was inspired by the American Classic film Wonder Man (1945). Decades later, Kamal Haasan's Kalyanaraman was heavily inspired by Wonder Man and Idhu Nijama. The film was run successfully in many centres.

== Background ==
S. Balachander made a grand reentry in cinema with Idhu Nijama in 1948/K. G. Productions. The film based on the English classic Wonder Man in 1945, produced by Samuel Goldwyn. Wonder Man had Arthur Sheekman's story reworked to a riveting screenplay by Jack Jevne and Eddie Moran, and directed by H. Bruce Humberstone. Wonder Man had Danny Kaye playing the dual role of Edwin Dingle and his twin Buzzy Bellew. Idhu Nijama was financed by S. Soundararajan Ayyengar and directed by Krishna Gopal, who was acclaimed as a technical wizard those days. S. Balachander watched the movie repeatedly and observed all the finer points of the film. He came up with a brilliant screenplay suitable for an Indian milieu. The set of London City such as the famous Westminster Bridge was so realistically designed and impressively photographed (Krishna Gopal) that many movie goers thought the sequence was shot on location in England. The film was shot at the famous Ranjit Studio in Bombay.

== Plot ==
The twin brothers are Madhavan (Madhu) and Gopal (S. Balachander). Madhu goes for higher studies in London city and Gopal runs a Musical instrument shop in Chennai. Madhu was killed in London because of love matters, whose ghost comes back to his house and reveals the reasons of his death. Madhu was only visible to his twin brother Gopal. When Gopal spells the word Ma, who enters the body of Gopal and how Gopal goes about avenging the murder of Madhu fills the rest of reels. Kumari Rajam played Madhu's pair while Sarojini played Gopal's sweetheart.

== Cast ==
- S. Balachander as Madhavan/Gopal (Twin Brothers)
- Sarojini as Nalini, Gopal's Sweetheart
- Kumari N. Rajam as Nirmala, Madhu's Sweetheart
- V. Seetharaman
- Manuel
- Pattammal
- A. S. Nagarajan

== Soundtrack ==
Music by S. Balachander and lyrics were written by M. S. Subramaniam. The playback singers consists of S. Balachander, Radha Jayalakshmi and P. Leela.

! No	Songs	Singers	lyrics
1	"Aaha Anandham Adainthane"	S. Balachander	M. S. Subramaniam
2	"Vaaruvaar Vandhiduvaar"	S. Balachander	M. S. Subramaniam
3	"Kaikorthu Edhirpaarkkum"		M. S. Subramaniam
4	"Aa Naane Magizhven"		M. S. Subramaniam
5	"Chaara Chora"	S. Balachander	M. S. Subramaniam
6	"Maami.. how I love"	S. Balachander	M. S. Subramaniam
7	"Ee Paaradi Lakshmi"		M. S. Subramaniam
8	"Romeo Antonio"		M. S. Subramaniam
9	"Neela Mayil Vaaganano"		M. S. Subramaniam
10	"Nee Thoonga Mattayo"		M. S. Subramaniam
11	"Anbenum Amuthalithu"		M. S. Subramaniam
12	"Kavali Yedhu Gopal"		M. S. Subramaniam
13	"Madarellam"	S. Balachander, Radha Jayalakshmi	M. S. Subramaniam
14	"Mara Malar"	S. Balachander, P. Leela	M. S. Subramaniam
