= Swapna (actress) =

Indian actress

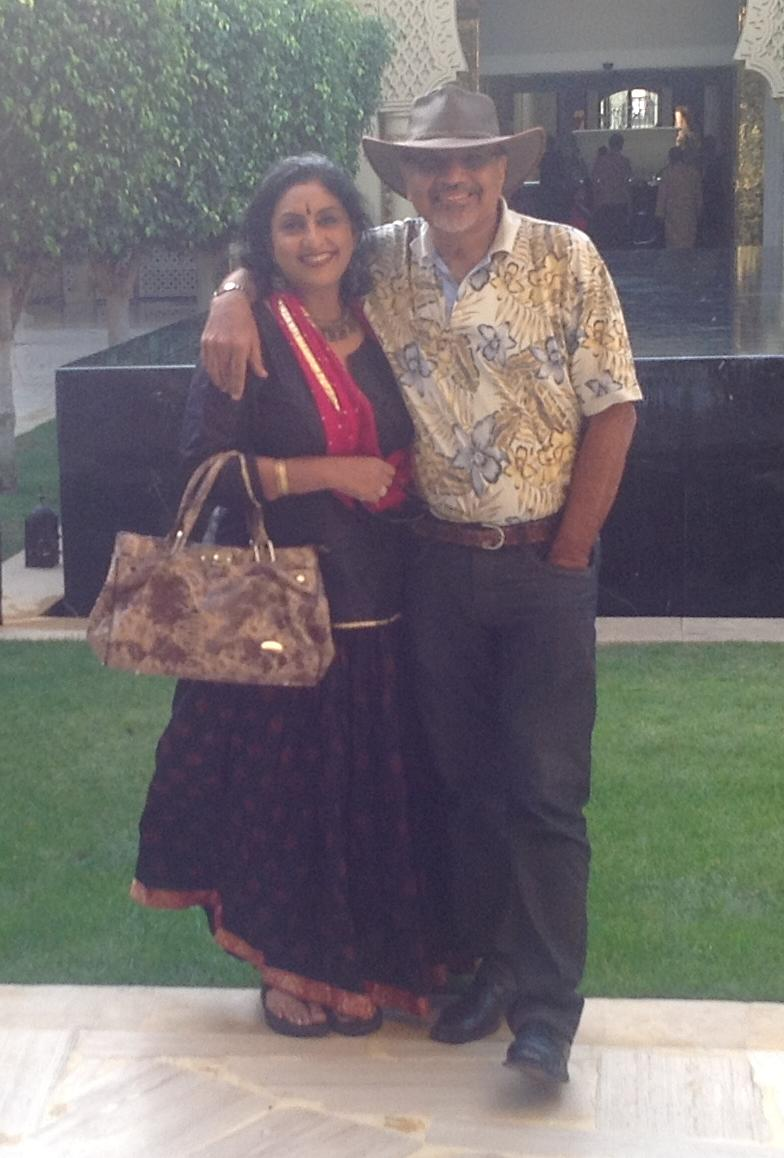
Swapna and Raman Khanna

Swapna Khanna is an Indian former actress who worked in Hindi, Malayalam, Telugu, Tamil and Kannada films from the 1980s and early 1990s. She was named Swapna, formerly Manjari Dhody, by Anil Sharma.

== Career ==
Swapna began her career with the P.G. Viswambharan directed Sangarsham (1981) and thereafter acted in several Tamil, Telugu and Malayalam language movies. She also appeared occasionally in Bollywood films like Teri Meherbaaniyan, Dak Bangla, Hukumat, Izzatdar, Janam Se Pehle and others. She guest starred in the Aditya Pancholi-starrer Qatil (1988). She left the film industry after her marriage in 1993 and worked with her husband, Raman Khanna in an event management company called Sangini Entertainment that organises and manages Bollywood and Indian classical dance events abroad. Their shows include Shaam-E-Rangeen and DreamGirls Of Bollywood, which have been performed worldwide. Along with this she also runs a resort called "The Brook at Khanna's", which is located in Karjat, Mumbai.

== Filmography ==
=== Hindi ===
- Guda (2003)
- Dhun (1996)
- Kis Kaam Ke Yeh Rishte (1995)
- Janam Se Pehle (1994)
- Saboot Mangta Hain Kanoon
- Chingari Aur Sholay
- Zindagi Ek Juaa (1992) - Sapna Bhatnagar
- Umar 55 Ki Dil Bachpan Ka (1992) - Bharti
- Kisme Kitna Hai Dum
- Swarg Jaisaa Ghar (1991)
- Kurbaan (1991)
- Farishtay (1991) - Gayatri
- Gori
- Izzatdaar (1990) - Sonu
- Aulad Ke Khatir (1990)
- Pyasi Meri Nigahen (1990)
- Ab Meri Baari (1989)
- Sachché Ká Bol-Bálá (1989) - Zarina
- Tujhe Nahin Chhodunga (1989)
- Indira (1989) - Geeta
- Sindoor Aur Bandook
- Paraya Ghar
- Lahu Ki Awaz
- Mera Muqaddar (1988) - Mary
- Aage Ki Soch (1988)
- Bandhan Baahon Ka
- Aai Pahije
- Qatil (1988) - Kamla
- Dak Bangla (1987) - Sapna/Princess Sapna
- Dacait (1987)
- Hukumat (1987) - Sonia
- Kachchi Jawani
- Patton Ki Baazi (1986) - Mona
- Fitarat
- Haqeeqat (1985) - Kusum
- Teri Meherbaniyan (1985) - Sharda Devi
- Lut Gayee Pyar Mein
- Sherdil Ladkiyan
- Ek Din Bahu Ka (1983) - Indu

=== Malayalam ===
- Kadathanadan Ambadi (1990) as Sreedevi Thampuratti
- Nagapanchami (1989)
- Karate Girls (1988)
- Uyaran Orumikkan (1988)
- Unnikale Oru Katha Parayam (1987)
- Thidambu (1986)
- Premalekhanam (1985) as Saramma Thomas
- Angadikkappurathu (1985) as Sherly
- Jeevante Jeevan (1985)
- Swanthamevide Bandhamevide (1984) as Usha
- Uyarangalil (1984) as Padma
- Bullet (1984) as Julie
- Minimol Vathicanil (1984) as Daisy
- Jeevitham (1984) as Renuka
- Vikatakavi (1984) as Sudha
- Aayiram Abhilashangal (1984)
- Bhookambam (1983) as Nisha
- Prem Nazirine Kanmanilla (1983) as Pappi
- Guru Dakshina (1983) as Reetha
- Shesham Kazhchayil (1983) as Elizabeth
- Onnu Chirikku (1983) as Rohini Menon
- Mortuary (1983) as Sindhu
- Paalam (1983) as Anitha
- Yudham (1983)
- Asuran (1983)
- Varanmaare Aavashyamundu (1982) as Pappi
- Innalenkil Nale (1982) as Vidhu
- Oru Thira Pinneyum Thira (1982) as Rema
- Chambalkadu (1982) as Sabitha
- Post Mortem (1982) as Alice
- Angachamayam (1982) as Malla
- Velicham Vitharunna Penkutti (1982) as Aasha
- Paanjajanyam (1982) as Indira
- Bheeman (1982)
- Dhrohi (1982)
- Garudan (1982)
- Ivan Oru Simham (1982) as Swapna
- Marupacha (1982) as Swapna
- John Jaffer Janardhanan (1982) as Sophiya
- Chiriyo Chiri (1982) as Sethubhai Thampuratti
- Sree Ayyappanum Vavarum (1982) as Bhavani
- Ahimsa (1981) as Radha
- Thrishna (1981) as Jayasree
- Swarnapakshikal (1981) as Devi
- Sangharsham (1981) as Sandhya

=== Kannada ===
- Bharjari Bete (1981)...Sheela
- Swapna (1981)
- Kaarmika KaLLanalla (1982)
- Khadeema KaLLaru (1982)

Shankar sundar (1982)

=== Tamil ===
- Rusi (1984)
- 24 Mani Neram (1984) - Swapna
- Puyalkadantha Boomi (1984)
- Punitha Malar (1982) - Asha
- Agni Sakshi (1982)
- Tik Tik Tik (1981) - Swapna
- Jadhikkoru Needi (1981)
- Kadal Meengal (1981) - Nisha
- Nenjile Thunivirunthal (1981)
- Nellikkani (1980)

=== Telugu ===
- Swapna (1981) as Swapna
- Priya (1981)
- Parvati Parameshwarulu (1981)
- Billa Ranga (1982)
- Kokilamma (1983)
- Kanchana Ganga (1984) as Ganga
- Samsaram O Sangeetam (1984)
- Kathanayakudu (1984)
