= Jadhikkoru Needhi =

- Theatrical release poster
- Directed by: S. Sankaran
- Screenplay by: S. Sankaran
- Based on: Sekku Maadugal by Komal Swaminathan
- Produced by: Vadalur S. Chidambaram
- Starring: Vijayakanth; Swapna
- Cinematography: M. Kesavan
- Edited by: T. Thirunavukkarasu
- Music by: Shankar–Ganesh
- Production company: P. S. V. Pictures
- Release date: 18 September 1981
- Country: India
- Language: Tamil

Jadhikkoru Needhi (transl. Justice for caste) is a 1981 Indian Tamil-language action drama film written and directed by S. Sankaran, starring Vijayakanth and Swapna. The film is based on the play Sekku Maadugal by Komal Swaminathan. It was released on 18 September 1981.

== Cast ==
- Vijayakanth
- Swapna
- Nagesh
- S. S. Chandran

== Soundtrack ==
Soundtrack was composed by Shankar–Ganesh.

Track listing
No.	Title	Lyrics	Singer(s)	Length
1.	"Yetramadi Yetram"	Era. Palanisamy	T. M. Soundararajan, P. Susheela	4:36
2.	"Bharatha Bhoomi"	Poonguyilan	T. M. Soundararajan	4:16
3.	"Ondru Sernthu"	M. Pavanan	T. M. Soundararajan, K. Latha	4:09
4.	"Orinathu"	Pulavarmari	T. M. Soundararajan, K. Latha, S. P. Ponnusamy, Manimala	4:09
Total length:				17:10

== Reception ==
Sindhu and Jeeva of Kalki praised the dialogues, acting performances of cast especially Nagesh, Kesavan's cinematography and Sankaran's direction but found the climax a huge drawback.
