= Karaiyellam Shenbagapoo =

- Title card
- Directed by: G. N. Rangarajan
- Based on: Karaiyellam Shenbagapoo by Sujatha
- Produced by: C. Shanmuga Sundaram
- Starring: Pratap Pothen; Sripriya
- Cinematography: N. K. Viswanathan
- Edited by: K. R. Ramalingam
- Music by: Ilaiyaraaja
- Production company: Sundari Art Creations
- Release date: 14 August 1981
- Running time: 123 minutes
- Country: India
- Language: Tamil

Karaiyellam Shenbagapoo (transl. The shore is full of champak flowers) is a 1981 Indian Tamil-language thriller film directed by G. N. Rangarajan, starring Pratap Pothen and Sripriya. It is based on Sujatha's novel of the same name. The film was released on 14 August 1981.

== Plot ==
Kalyanaraman a young man comes to a village from the town to collect village songs for his research. There, he meets a village girl named Velli who helps him to carry his luggage. Velli and her cousin Maruthamuththu are in love with each other, hoping to marry soon. Kalyanaraman stays in an abandoned old bungalow of the village Zamindar's, arranged by a village head man called Thangarasu. The Zamindar is now dead and their children live in far away towns with no connections with the village. Thangarasu tells Kalyanaraman about an old woman named Periyaththa who sings village songs well. On the first day, Kalyanaraman wanders around the big bungalow, witnessing old photographs of the Zamindar and his wife. On the upper floor, he finds a newly smoked cigarette which confuses him, as the bungalow has been abandoned for many years. On the night of the first day, Kalyanaraman hears someone is walking on the top floor, but cannot find who it is.

One day, Kalyanaraman finds an old cupboard which has old books inside it. When he is checking the books, he is shocked by a voice behind him. He sees a young woman who introduces herself as Snehalatha. Thangarasu is also present there, telling him that she is the daughter of the Zamindar's last son. She tells Raman that she has come just for spending her vacation. Raman wants to search for another place to stay. But Snehalatha tells him not to go as he is a guest of hers. She stays in another room of the Bungalow. Maruthamuththu starts helping Snehalatha and introduces her to Velli also. On that night, Maruthamuththu also stays outside of the Bungalow for their safety. In the middle of the night, Raman is waken up by a strange sound again and he goes out and wakes up Maruthamuththu. They both go and check and suddenly someone runs out of the bungalow, but they fail to catch the person.

Snehalatha gets close with Maruthamuththu, which makes Velli angry. One day when Raman is checking for the book cupboard, he finds a diary written by Rathnavathi Devi, the wife of the Zamindar. He shows it to Snehalatha, and Snehalatha grabs the diary, refuses to give it back to him and tells him that she cannot allow an outsider to read her family diary. When investigating about Rathnavadidevi from Periyaththa, she tells him the story of Innocent Rathnavadi Devi and how the Zamindar, who is a womaniser tortured her. She also confesses that once the Zamindar tried to molest her, but she somehow was able to run away from there, whereas the truth is she cooperated with the Zamindar. Raman tries several times to get that diary, but fails. Finally, Snehalatha confesses to him that she didn't show him because it has the truth that Rathnavadi Devi hadn't committed suicide, but was murdered. After hearing this, Raman stops trying to read the diary.

A dispute arises between Velli and Snehalatha as Velli accuses Snehalatha of seducing his fiancée and separating him from her. During the dispute, Maruthamuththu, who is now under full control of Snehalatha, beats Velli. An aggrieved Velli goes away from there. The Village Kovil Festival starts and on a night where all the villagers are gathered to watch a "Villu Paattu" show about a village deity Neeli, Snehalatha and Maruthamuththu go away from there in the middle of the show. Noticing this, Velli, who thinks that they are going to be together, follows them after some time that they have gone.

After the show finishes, Raman goes to the bungalow and finds Snehalatha dead. They also find a Voodoo Doll in her room. They inform Snehalatha's father about her death by telegram. Meanwhile, Velli's father says that Velli is missing. People and police suspect that there may be any connection between the murder and the disappearance of Velli. So they search for Velli. At midnight, while Raman is sleeping, Velli comes to him admitting that she has killed Snehalatha by dropping a rock on her. While Raman and Velli are having a conversation on this Police inspector, constables, Maruthamuththu and Thangarasu comes there to search the Bungalow for Velli. Raman saves Velli by hiding her in the secret door behind an old cupboard in his room.

After the police leave, Velli returns to Raman covered by gold jewellery. She tells Raman that she hid in the well and there she found a box of gold jewellery. Raman also finds that Velli has not thrown a rock at Snehalatha, but a small stone given by the village clergy man in order to save Maruthamuththu from her control, which she believed that the stone had powers of Goddess Kali. Raman goes near the well with her and sees the box. Also they get a return telegram from the son of the Zamindar stating that they have no daughter in the name of Snehalatha and all of their daughters are alive. However, Velli is taken under the custody under suspicion.

Raman finds the diary that Snehalatha has been hiding from him and reads. It is the diary of Rathnavadi devi, in which she has written all the tortures given by Zamindar in order to take over her jewels given to her by her parents. And also she has left a clue on the diary that where all of her jewels have been hidden by keeping a Shenbagam flower in that particular page. After seeing the dried flower, Raman realises that the box of jewellery found in the well is Rathnavadi's as there is a Shenbagam tree near the well. He also realises that that Snehalatha should have come for this treasure and someone else is also there behind the scenes who has also killed Snehalatha. He reveals a plan to the inspector to catch the criminal.

The next night they hide behind the trees near the well and see a man trying to enter the well. They immediately catch him and find that he is the Bioscope man who wanders in the village. (Seen as a small character in previous scenes). After getting caught, he admits that he has killed Snehalatha and reveals the reason. Actually, he is also a son of the Zamindar's through one of the Zamindar's mistresses. His mother was a stage drama artist, not treated well by the Zamindar and remained in poverty until she died. Before her death she has told his son to search for the treasure. He has got the help of his girl friend Snehalatha, a girl from the red light area. She has betrayed him after finding the jewels. On the night of Villu paattu, he accidentally kills Snehalatha during the dispute and ran away. Maruthamuththu also reveals that on the night of Villu paattu, they both came and searched for the box in the well and found it. But he never knew that there is jewels in the box and he has promised her to keep it as a secret.

Finally, the Bioscope man is arrested and the film ends with Raman returning to town, and Velli and Maruthamuththu is a happy couple again.

== Cast ==
- Pratap Pothen as C. Kalyanaraman
- Sripriya as Velli alias Vellaiyamma
- Sumalatha as Sneghalatha
- Sundar as Maruthamuthu
- Manorama as Periyaatha
- K. A. Thangavelu as Constable periyasamy
- Pandu as Thangarasu
- Kallapetti Singaram as Velli's father
- Peeli Sivam as Inspector
- Kula Deivam V. R. Rajagopal as Villupaatu singer
- Master Haja Sheriff as Velli's brother
- T. K. S. Natarajan as Villu Paatu singer
- "Kambar" Jayaraman as Bioscope Srinivasan

== Production ==
Ilaiyaraaja suggested to Sujatha the idea of a thriller set in a rustic milieu, and Sujatha soon came up with the novel Karaiyellam Shenbagapoo. Pratap Pothen said he chose to do the film adaptation because of the story and character.

== Soundtrack ==
The music was composed by Ilaiyaraaja.

Song	Singers	Lyrics	Length
"Yerupudichavare..."	Malaysia Vasudevan, P. Susheela	Gangai Amaran	04:24
"Yeriyile..."	S. Janaki, Ilaiyaraaja & Chorus	Panchu Arunachalam	04:46
"Kadellaam..."	Ilaiyaraaja & Chorus	Panchu Arunachalam	04:34
"Kalyanraman..."	S. P. Balasubrahmanyam, S. Janaki	Gangai Amaran	04:25
"Villu Paattu"	Chorus	Gangai Amaran	03:21

== Reception ==
Nalini Sastry of Kalki criticised Rangarajan's direction, Prathap's performance and felt Sripriya was miscast.
