= Classmates (2006 film) =

2006 Indian Malayalam film directed by Lal Jose

- DVD cover
- Directed by: Lal Jose
- Written by: James Albert
- Produced by: Prakash Damodaran; P. K. Muralidharan
- Starring: Prithviraj Sukumaran; Narain; Jayasurya; Indrajith; Kavya Madhavan
- Cinematography: Rajeev Ravi
- Edited by: Ranjan Abraham
- Music by: Alex Paul
- Production company: Arya Films
- Distributed by: Lal Release
- Release date: 25 August 2006
- Running time: 150 minutes
- Country: India
- Language: Malayalam
- Budget: ₹2.5–3.5 crore
- Box office: ₹18–25 crore

Classmates is a 2006 Indian Malayalam-language coming-of-age drama film directed by Lal Jose and written by James Albert. The film features an ensemble cast including Prithviraj Sukumaran, Narain, Jayasurya, Indrajith Sukumaran and Kavya Madhavan alongside Balachandra Menon, Radhika, Shobha Mohan Jagathy Sreekumar, Anoop Chandran, and Suraj Venjaramoodu in major supporting roles. The story revolves around a college graduate class of 1991. In 2006, working in different corners of the world, the friends get together for a class reunion to revive their college days. But on the night of the reunion, one of the students is found almost dead under mysterious circumstances.

Classmates was produced by Prakash Damodaran and P. K. Muralidharan through their company Arya Films, and is the company's debut production. The soundtrack album and background score were composed by Alex Paul. Classmates' cinematography was handled by Rajeev Ravi and editing was done by Ranjan Abraham. Principal photography primarily took place in and around C. M. S. College, Kottayam and Ooty and was completed in a span of 55 days, during the months of April and May.

The film was released on 25 August 2006 during Onam holiday period. The film became a major box office success, with a theatrical run of 150 days at Abhilash Complex, Kottayam. It became the highest-grossing Malayalam film of 2006. The film won two Kerala State Film Awards, five Kerala Film Critics Association Awards and three Asianet Film Awards. It was later remade into Tamil as Ninaithale Inikkum (2009) with Prithviraj reprised his role from the original film, and in Telugu and Marathi as Classmates (2007) and Classmates (2015), respectively.

Classmates has since become one of the most acclaimed films of its decade, particularly for its soundtrack. It is considered by many critics as one of the best campus films in Malayalam cinema. The film developed a cult following in the years after its release and is frequently referenced in popular Keralite culture. With the release of film, the concept of alumni meet started trending in Kerala, and schools and colleges started organising such get togethers to help the ex-students keep in touch with each other. The film is now regarded as a classic in Malayalam cinema.

== Plot ==
2006: It was Murali's dream to have a 15-year reunion with his classmates from college, but he had mysteriously died while still in college in 1991. His parents, Iyer and Lakshmi, both teachers at the college, decide to fulfill their deceased son's dream and organize the reunion. His classmates include Suku, Satheesan, Vasu, Pious, Thara, and Raziya. Suku is now a successful diamond dealer and business tycoon based in Mumbai; Satheesan is an MLA, while Vasu is his PA. Pious is settled in the Middle East, and Thara is a classical dancer and runs a dance school. Raziya had suffered a nervous breakdown years ago and is on her way to a slow recovery.

All the old classmates arrive for the reunion and are reliving their old memories. Unexpectedly, Suku attempts suicide that night, although the friends suspect that this is not the case. Even though they find out his personal diary with many negative notes and suicide notes penned by him, they refuse to believe it. Pious then narrates Suku's backstory to Iyer while at the hospital.

1991: Murali is a singer, Suku is a firebrand student union leader in student politics, and Pious is a rich, spoiled brat and Suku's best friend. Suku's rival Satheeshan leads the opposite faction of student politics with his sidekick Vasu. Thara Kurup is the daughter of an MLA and also an award-winning classical dancer. Raziya comes from a conservative Muslim family.

During the final year of college, when Satheeshan realizes Suku and Thara are in love, he plans to separate them and makes her stand against Suku in a college election. Just before election day, Satheeshan steals a letter Thara wrote for Suku and puts it inside the ballot box. Pious sees this, and he and Suku plan to retrieve the letter at night but are unable to do so. That same night, Raziya and Murali, who are in love, decide to meet in the generator room to elope. Raziya waits for Murali in the generator room, but he does not show up. The next day, Thara's letter is exposed, causing a public scandal. Satheeshan tells everyone, including Thara, that Suku was the one who put the letter in the ballot box to misuse it. Thara breaks up with Suku, and a vicious fight then breaks out between Suku and Satheeshan. During the fight, they are told that Murali has been found dead by Raziya in the generator room. Raziya then has a nervous breakdown.

After Murali's funeral, Suku decides to discontinue his studies. He goes to Mumbai and begins his diamond business. His business associate, Shantharam, helps Suku with his family and marries him to his daughter Ratna. After Shantharam's death, Suku takes over the business, but he and Ratna get a divorce.

2006: In the present, Thara reveals that she came to the reunion to apologize to Suku for her breakup. After Suku left for Mumbai, she realized he was actually kind and honest. She reveals that a guilt-ridden Satheeshan met her after a few years and admitted he put Thara's letter in the ballot box for his petty political gains and that he was why Suku stopped coming to college. She had also learnt about Suku's marriage and divorce.

Thara reveals that on the night of the get-together, she met Suku in the generator room. She tearfully apologized, confessed her love, and gently asked whether they could reunite. Suku then slightly holds her hands, and she becomes emotional, bursting into tears and emotionally embracing him, and he holds her in his arms. She also emotionally says she does not understand why he tried to commit suicide even though she reunited with him. Suku confesses that on the night he and Pious went to take Thara's letter from the ballot box, he hid in the generator room from security and found someone already there. In the darkness, mistaking the person for one of Satheeshan's men, he attacked and inadvertently killed that person, who turned out to be Murali. Due to his shock and guilt, he decided to discontinue his studies and leave the college. He also told her that she was free to tell everyone about that fateful incident, but she never did so.

Raziya later talks to Iyer about her nervous breakdown and her recovery. She then reveals that she also went into the generator room to remember Murali but hid from Suku and Thara and had overheard them. Raziya, consumed with rage due to Murali's death, visits Suku the next day, strangles him using a string from Murali's guitar when he was alone, and stages it as a suicide. However, she regrets it later.

When Suku regains consciousness in the hospital, he tells the police that he tried to commit suicide, instead of what actually happened. Suku apologizes to Iyer for killing Murali and tells Iyer to kill him as he does not want to live with everyone's curses. Iyer, Lakshmi and Raziya forgive him and ask Suku to be with Thara, as she had been waiting for him for the past 15 years. Suku forgives her and accepts her as his spouse, and she embraces him with tears of joy.

== Cast ==
- Prithviraj Sukumaran as P. Sukumaran a.k.a. Suku
- Narain as Murali Iyer
- Jayasurya as Satheeshan Kanjikuzhi, Thodupuzha MLA
- Indrajith Sukumaran as Pious George (PG)
- Kavya Madhavan as Thara Kurup
- Radhika as Raziya
- Balachandra Menon as Professor Iyer, Murali's father
- Shobha Mohan as Lakshmi Iyer, Murali's mother
- Jagathy Sreekumar as Fr. Esthappaan, Men's Hostel Warden
- Suraj Venjaramoodu as Ousepp
- Anoop Chandran as 'Pazhanthuni' Koshi
- Vijeesh as Vasu Sadashivan a.k.a. Vaalu Vasu
- J Pallassery as Fr. Geevarghese (College Principal)
- V. K. Sreeraman as Kunju Muhammad, Raziya's father
- Sukumari as Janaki, Sukumaran's mother
- Suja Menon as Bindu Balachandran
- Anil Murali as SI Zachariah
- Renjusha Menon as Kavitha
- Soorya J Menon as Aiswarya
- Shajahan RDX as Rahman
- Lekshmi Viswanath as Mariya

== Soundtrack ==
Classmates

Soundtrack album by Alex Paul
- Released: 31 August 2006
- Recorded: 2006
- Genre: Feature film soundtrack
- Length: 26:16
- Label: Sathyam Audios

Alex Paul chronology
Thanthra (2006)	Classmates (2006)	Bhargavacharitham Moonam Khandam (2006)

Alex Paul scored the film's background music and composed its soundtrack, lyrics for which was penned by Vayalar Sarath Chandra Varma. The soundtrack album consists of six tracks. The songs were recorded at Panchathan Record Inn, and the soundtrack was released under the Sathyam Audios label. It was released in Thiruvananthapuram on 31 August 2006 in the form of audio cassettes and compact discs.

Track listing
No.	Title	Lyrics	Singer(s)	Length
1.	"Kattadi Thanalum"	Vayalar Sarath Chandra Varma	Vidhu Prathap, Reju Joseph, Ramesh Babu, Cicily	4:00
2.	"Kathirunna Pennalle"	Vayalar Sarath Chandra Varma	Devanand, Jyotsna Radhakrishnan	5:24
3.	"Vote"	Vayalar Sarath Chandra Varma	M. G. Sreekumar, Pradeep	4:34
4.	"Ente Khalbile - Male"	Vayalar Sarath Chandra Varma	Vineeth Sreenivasan	4:19
5.	"Ente Khalbile - Female"	Vayalar Sarath Chandra Varma	Sujatha Mohan	4:30
6.	"Chillu Jaalaka"	Vayalar Sarath Chandra Varma	Manjari	5:27
Total length:				32:48

Reception

Upon the album's release, it topped the charts with the song "Ente Khalbile" receiving significant radio and TV airtime. According to a year-end analysis by Sify, Classmates had become the highest selling soundtrack in Malayalam cinema up to that point. Paresh C. Palicha of Now Running reported, "To say that music of Classmates has become popular would be an understatement. It dominates the charts." The song "Ente Khalbile" further propelled Sreenivasan's playback singing career in Malayalam cinema, becoming his biggest hit. The song "Ente Khalbile" reached number one on the charts on 19 October 2006, while the songs "Kattadi Thanalum" and "Kathuirna" reached the second and fourth spot respectively. "Kattadi Thanalum" and "Kathirunna" dropped to the third and fifth place respectively on 3 November 2006 while, Ente Khalbile retained its top spot. "Ente Khalbile" dropped to the second place on 14 November 2006 when "Karineela Kannilenthedee" reached number one.

Writing for The Hindu, music critic T. P. Sasthamangalam wrote, "The songs in Classmates recalls memories of the golden age of Malayalam music." Like Aniyathipravu and Niram, Lal Jose's Classmates is proving to be a trendsetter." A reviewer from Varnachithram wrote, "The music of the movie too deserves mention. Alex Paul and Vayalar Sharat Chandra Varma's songs re-create the spirit of the campus with very memorable songs. Our favorite is "Ente Khalbile"." Unni Nair of Now Running wrote that the film's music adds to the "charm" of the film. Paresh C. Palicha of Now Running wrote, "Classmates is a rare phenomenon in recent times where music plays an integral part of the narrative, and that is the reason for its success."

== Release ==
Produced by Arya Films and distributed by Lal Creations, Classmates was released to low expectations, on 25 August 2006, during the Onam holiday period. It faced competition from other releases such as the Mohanlal-starrer Mahasamudram. The film opened to a wide audience, with 47 screens across Kerala. The DVD of the film with 5.1 surround sound was distributed by Central Home Entertainments. It was made available for streaming on Disney+ Hotstar since 2020.

== Reception ==
=== Critical reception ===
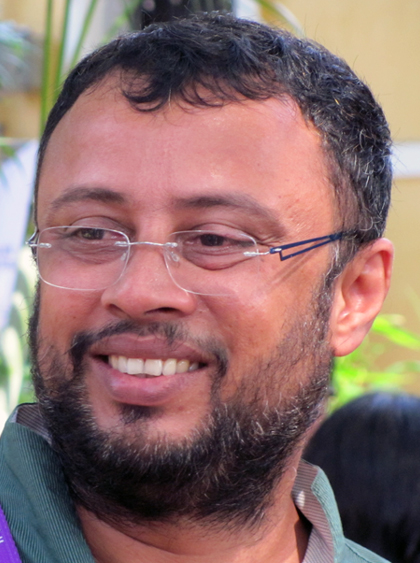
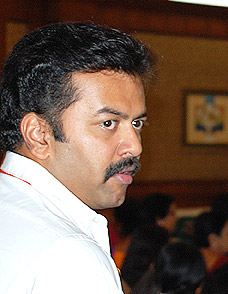
Lal Jose's (left) direction and Indrajith's (right) performance received praise.

Classmates received generally positive reviews, with critics praising its direction, story and cinematography. Paresh C. Palicha of Rediff wrote, "Classmates tells a campus story with a difference, and it is a well-narrated tale." He however, criticized the film's second half, writing: "But somewhere along the way, debutant writer James Albert shifts gears and takes the suspense-thriller route that culminates in a solution to the mystery behind Murali's death. Maybe it is a trick played to flummox the audience, but somehow the effort fails to excite." Palicha opined that Lal Jose did a "good job" and praised Rajeev Ravi's cinematography writing, "Though he has shot almost the entire film on a single location, we do not feel the monotony because of Rajeev Ravi's competent cinematography." Writing for The Hindu, Sreedhar Pillai called the film a "trendsetter" and wrote, "The success of Classmates is that its story appeals to all sections of the audience and vividly evokes fond bitter-sweet memories of college days." A critic from Sify wrote, "Lal Jose is a gutsy and daring different director and he proved once again with Classmates." and also termed the film a "trendsetter."

Unni Nair of Now Running wrote, "Director Lal Jose's Onam offering, sends very positive signals as far as the Malayalam film industry is concerned. The refreshingly different film proves that with the back-up of a well-written script and good direction, the younger generation stars too can also work miracles." A critic from entertainment portal IndiaGlitz said, "Other than the color and gaiety of campus life, Lal Jose's throw in a good mix of emotions and suspense. The film which opens with a little indifference soon falls to tracks to deliver the rest that surprises you and offer you an intimate and passionate viewing." They also praise Indrajith's performance writing, "Prithviraj and Kavya lead the show with their regular strengths in emoting, but the pick of the mates is definitely, Indrajith, who shows great timing and flexibility in renditions. He definitely proves once again that he is to go distances in the Malayalam film industry." Varnachithram felt that two aspects made the film "interesting" which was the "nostalgia it creates for the campus life" and the "way of narration." They also praised the performance of the cast, writing that Prithviraj had done an "excellent" job, writing "As we saw in Vargam (2006), playing arrogant head strong characters is his forte. But in this movie he gets to be a romantic as well as a devastated and helpless man." They called Indrajith a "revelation", praising his comedic timing. The critic also wrote "Though we are not big fans of Jayasurya after seeing terrible movies like Immini Nalloral (2005) and Pulival Kalyanam (2003), we were impressed with his role as Sateeshan. He can make a good villain." In October 2021, The Times of India wrote, "The movie keeps the suspense going till the end but most importantly leaves a perfect campus memory."

=== Box office ===
On release, initial response was tepid, but favorable word-of-mouth publicity and positive critical response helped it to become a box office success. In Kottayam, Classmates opened at the 288-seater Asha theatre but was shifted to the bigger 1180 Abhilash complex, due to tremendous pressure for tickets. It emerged the Onam winner and completed a 150-day theatrical run. It grossed a distributors' share of ₹2.10 crore in 21 days, which was a record. Despite new releases on Ramadan, the film still held the top spot. It remained the top earning film in Kerala for a period of three months, till the release of Chakkaramuthu. The film completed 150 days run in Thiruvananthapuram and 100 days in Kottayam and Ernakulam as well. It grossed a record distributors' share of ₹26.25 Lakhs in 40 days from Kavitha's theatre, Ernakulam and a record share of ₹14.26 Lakhs in 40 days in Abhilash complex, Kottayam. It became the highest grossing Malayalam film ever in the Kottayam district. The film went on to gross approximately ₹17-25 crores and concluded its final commercial performance with the verdict "blockbuster". The film thus emerged as the highest-grossing Malayalam film of the year. According to film-trade website Sify, it was touted to collect ₹10 crores in distributors share by the end of its theatrical run.

== Accolades ==
Award	Category	Nominee(s)	Result	Ref.
Kerala State Film Awards	Best Film with Popular Appeal and Aesthetic Value	Lal Jose	Won	
Kerala State Film Awards	Best Story	James Albert	Won	
Kerala Film Critics Awards	Best Popular Film	Lal Jose	Won	
Kerala Film Critics Awards	Best Screenplay	James Albert	Won	
Kerala Film Critics Awards	Best Music Director	Alex Paul	Won	
Kerala Film Critics Awards	Second Best Actor	Jagathy Sreekumar	Won	
Kerala Film Critics Awards	Special Award	Indrajith	Won	
Asianet Film Awards	Best Film	Lal Jose	Won	
Asianet Film Awards	Best Script Writer	James Albert	Won	
Asianet Film Awards	Best Male Playback singer	Vineeth Sreenivasan	Won	
Vanitha Film Awards	Best Director	Lal Jose	Won	
Vanitha Film Awards	Best Lyricist	Vayalar Sarath Chandra Varma	Won	
Vanitha Film Awards	Best Music Director	Alex Paul	Won	
Vanitha Film Awards	Best Singer - Male	Vineeth Sreenivasan	Won	
Amrita Film Awards	Best Supporting Actress	Radhika	Won	
Jaihind Film Awards	Best Male Playback singer	Vineeth Sreenivasan	Won	
Atlas Film Critics Awards	Best Music Director	Alex Paul	Won	
Atlas Film Critics Awards	Best Female Playback Singer	Manjari	Won	
Atlas Film Critics Awards	Second Best Actor	Jagathy Sreekumar	Won	

== Remakes ==
Classmates has been remade in Tamil as Ninaithale Inikkum, with Prithviraj reprising his role. Narain is replaced by Shakthi Vasu and Kavya is replaced by Priyamani. The Telugu rights for the film were purchased by Shravanthi Ravikishore. The Telugu remake titled Classmates, with Sumanth, Sharwanand and Sadha playing the lead roles, released in 2007. In 2015 it was remade in Marathi as Classmates with Ankush Chaudhary, Sai Tamhankar and Siddharth Chandekar.
