= James Albert (screenwriter) =

Indian scriptwriter and director

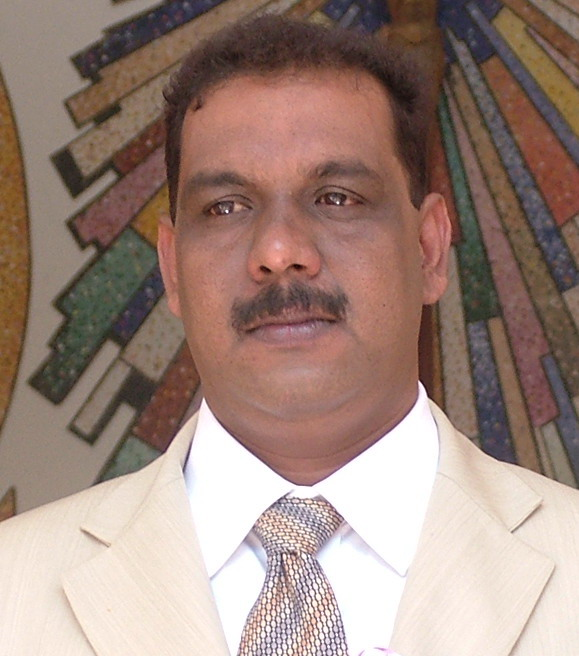
- Born: Kollam, Kerala, India
- Occupations: Script writer and director
- Years active: 2006 - present

James Albert is an Indian script writer and director who works in Malayalam cinema. He graduated from Fatima Mata National College, Kollam. He is probably most popular for his debut screenplay Classmates (2006).

== Career ==
He started his career through the film Classmates (2006). His next movie was Cycle directed by Johny Antony. Mariyam Mukku was his directorial debut.

== Filmography ==
Film	Year	Notes
Classmates	2006	Won; Kerala State Film Award for Best Story,
Cycle	2008	
Evidam Swargamanu	2009	Won; Kerala State Film Award for Best Popular Film
Venicile Vyaapari	2011	
Jawan of Vellimala	2012	
Ezhu Sundara Rathrikal	2013	
Mariyam Mukku	2015	Directorial Debut
