= G. N. Rangarajan =

Indian writer (1930–2021)

- Born: 17 December 1930; Gobichettipalayam, composite Coimbatore District, Madras Presidency, British India (now in Erode district, Tamil Nadu, India)
- Died: 3 June 2021 (aged 90); Chennai, Tamil Nadu, India
- Occupations: Writer, producer, director
- Children: G. N. R. Kumaravelan

G. N. Rangarajan (17 December 1930 – 3 June 2021) was an Indian writer, producer and director who worked in Tamil cinema.

== Film career ==
Rangarajan was influenced by the works of director A. Bhimsingh, and joined editor Dorai Singam as an assistant in the late 1950s. The first film Rangarajan began work on as an assistant director was Gnayirum Thingalum, which was shelved. He became associated with director S. P. Muthuraman and writer Panchu Arunachalam for many films, early in his career. He worked as an associate director on films including Bhuvana Oru Kelvi Kuri (1977), Aarilirunthu Arubathu Varai (1979) and Priya (1978).

As a director, Rangarajan subsequently collaborated with Kamal Haasan on a number of successful films including Kalyanaraman (1979), Meendum Kokila (1981), Kadal Meengal (1981) and Ellam Inba Mayyam (1981) in a two-year period. Notably, he took over directorial duties from Mahendran during the making of Meendum Kokila on the insistence of Kamal Haasan. He later also wrote and produced films, notably making Aduthathu Albert (1985) and Sir... I Love You (1991). His final directorial Maharasan (1993), had Kamal Haasan in the lead role, who refused to take any salary for the film, in ode to his friendship with Rangarajan. Following his film career, Rangarajan worked on the television series Raghuvamsam and also made a telefilm for Singaporean producers.

Owing to his association with Kamal Haasan, Rangarajan renamed his house as "Kamal Illam". His son, G. N. R. Kumaravelan, apprenticed with Kamal Haasan for films such as Sathi Leelavathi (1995) and Marudhanayagam, and then debuted as a director in the late 2000s.

== Death ==
Rangarajan died on 3 June 2021, aged 90, due to age-related ailments.

== Partial filmography ==
Films

Year	Film	Credited as			Notes
Year	Film	Director	Writer	Producer	Notes
1979	Kalyanaraman	✓	✗	✗	
1980	Rusi Kanda Poonai	✓	✗	✗	
1981	Meendum Kokila	✓	✗	✗	
1981	Kadal Meengal	✓	✗	✗	
1981	Karaiyellam Shenbagapoo	✓	✗	✗	
1981	Ellam Inba Mayyam	✓	✗	✗	
1982	Rani Theni	✓	✓	✓	
1983	Muthu Engal Sothu	✓	✓	✓	
1985	Aduthathu Albert	✓	✓	✓	
1991	Sir... I Love You	✓	✓	✗	
1993	Maharasan	✓	✓	✓	

Television

- Raghuvamsam
