= Kadal Meengal =

- Theatrical release poster
- Directed by: G. N. Rangarajan
- Screenplay by: Panchu Arunachalam
- Story by: T. Damodaran
- Produced by: R. Shantha
- Starring: Kamal Haasan; Sujatha; Nagesh; Swapna; Ambika
- Cinematography: N. K. Viswanathan
- Edited by: K. R. Ramalingam
- Music by: Ilaiyaraaja
- Production company: K. R. G. Art Productions
- Release date: 5 June 1981
- Running time: 137 minutes
- Country: India
- Language: Tamil

Kadal Meengal (transl. Sea Fishes) is a 1981 Indian Tamil-language masala film directed by G. N. Rangarajan, starring Kamal Haasan, Sujatha, Nagesh and Swapna. It is a remake of the 1980 Malayalam film Meen, and also draws inspiration from the Hindi film Trishul (1978). The film revolves around a man seeking revenge on his father for abandoning the former's mother. It was released on 5 June 1981.

== Plot ==
Selvanayagam "Selvam", a poor but hardworking fisherman, loves Bhagyam, the daughter of his father's friend, Nachimuthu. After Sivaanandham loses his job, Selvam's sister‑in‑law, Annapoorani, constantly belittles him. Though Selvam doesn't own a boat, he's determined to earn respect. When the hamlet opposes motorboat loans, Selvam buys one and starts fishing. Vadivelu, the moneylender, envious of Selvam, instructs the villagers to boycott him, forcing Selvam and his friend Peter to fish alone. Selvam and Bhagyam secretly consummate their love. Seeing no one buy Selvam's catch, Nachimuthu helps him sell the fish in the nearby village. At night, Vadivelu tries to damage Selvam's boat, sparking a fight where Selvam chases away Vadivelu's men. Annapoorani, fearing Vadivelu's wrath, tells Selvam to leave the house.

After Nachimuthu dies, Vadivelu plans to force‑marry Bhagyam to settle Nachimuthu's unpaid debt. A cyclone hits the Bay of Bengal, and Selvam and Peter are already at sea. Selvam's boat is caught in the storm; the next day, news reports that all boats were overturned. Selvam was severely injured but rescued and hospitalized elsewhere with Peter. They write a letter to Bhagyam, but Vadivelu tears it, keeping her in the dark. Believing Selvam dead, Bhagyam flees the hamlet to escape Vadivelu. A month later, Selvam returns to learn that Bhagyam is missing. Unknown to him, Bhagyam has given birth to their son, Rajan. Selvam secures loans, expands his business, and becomes a wealthy fishing businessman. Bhagyam, hearing he's alive, comes to meet him, only to see Selvanayagam marrying another woman. Heartbroken, she leaves. Now poverty‑stricken, Annapoorani sends Sivaanandham to Selvam for a job. Selvam, despite past mistreatment, puts him in charge of his businesses.

Years later, Rajan is now a fisherman, whom the villagers refuse to give a boat, calling him "illegitimate." Rajan learns that his father, Selvanayagam, is now a rich businessman running Selvanayagam Fishing Corporation, and Annapoorani is splurging the hard‑earned money. Rajan finds work as a fisherman in a nearby hamlet. Sivaanadham's son Ravi, misdirects Selvanayagam's motorboats to where small canoes are fishing, causing heavy losses. Selvanayagam funds their losses, but Rajan throws the money back in Selvanayagam's face. Rajan loses his job for humiliating Selvanayagam, who's seen as a benefactor. Rajan builds a hut outside Selvanayagam's office and beats the goons Selvanayagam sent to clear it. Selvanayagam's daughter, Uma, loves Sekhar, a hotel singer. Dhanakodi, Selvam's business partner, wants his son Ashok to marry Uma. Selvam agrees to the marriage without Uma's consent; she resists fiercely. Dhanakodi is furious when Selvanayagam backs out, having decided to unite Uma with Sekhar.

Unbeknownst to Selvanayagam, Ravi sends goons to attack Rajan. Dhanakodi rescues Rajan, gaining his trust to use him against Selvanayagam. To avenge Selvanayagam for abandoning Bhagyam, Rajan allies with Dhanakodi. On Dhanakodi's suggestion, Rajan plants smuggled silver bars in the boat driven by Peter, and tips off the police. The police seize the bars and arrest Selvanayagam. Peter is chased out of the house, blamed for smuggling. Rajan gets Mudhaliyar, Selvanayagam's accountant, drunk and learns of a secret wood‑procurement deal. At the auction, he inflates the price, forcing Selvanayagam to buy ₹40,00,000 (equivalent to ₹89 million or US$930,000 in 2026) worth of wood for ₹1,25,00,000 (equivalent to ₹280 million or US$2.9 million in 2026), causing a huge loss. Annapoorani urges Ravi to question the loss, but Selvanayagam snaps, declaring it's his hard‑earned money and no one can interfere. He asks Annapoorani to sign documents to repay the debt; Mudhaliyar suggests they meet Dhanakodi for help.

Dhanakodi exploits this by making them transfer properties to Rajan temporarily. Rajan takes over Selvanayagam's businesses, forcing Selvanayagam out. Feeling betrayed by Mudhaliyar and his brother's family, Selvanayagam leaves. Dhanakodi's daughter Devi falls for Rajan. Dhanakodi refuses to return the properties to Annapoorani, claiming betrayal. Peter consoles Selvanayagam and reunites with him; they take a boat ride when Selvanayagam expresses his wish to be thrown into the sea after death as gratitude to the sea that made him rich. Meanwhile, Rajan saves Sekhar from goons and informs Uma, making her think Selvanayagam ordered the attack. Rajan stops Dhanakodi's son Ashok from molesting Uma and brings Uma to his mother Bhagyam. Selvanayagam fears Uma is missing. Devi misunderstands Rajan's feelings for Uma and tells Selvanayagam.

Selvanayagam rushes to Rajan's house, and seeing Bhagyam, discovers Rajan is his biological son. Bhagyam's last wish is to be cremated beside Selvanayagam, wanting to spend at least their afterlife together. Rajan arranges Uma's marriage to Sekhar. With a changed heart, he transfers Selvanayagam's properties back to his name. Dhanakodi demands the properties from Rajan, who refuses. Enraged, Dhanakodi kidnaps Rajan. A fight ensues between Dhanakodi's men, Selvanayagam, and Rajan. Dhanakodi holds Bhagyam at gunpoint, forcing Rajan to hand over the properties. In the scuffle, Dhanakodi shoots Bhagyam. Selvanayagam, Bhagyam, and Rajan flee by boat, with Dhanakodi's henchmen in pursuit. Dhanakodi shoots Selvanayagam.

Devi brings the police just in time, arresting Dhanakodi and his men. The entire fishing hamlet mourns Selvanayagam's and Bhagyam's deaths. Rajan and Peter fulfill their last wish, pushing Selvanayagam and Bhagyam's coffins together into the ocean.

== Cast ==
- Kamal Haasan in a dual role as Selvanayagam "Selvam" and Rajan
  - Master Suresh as young Rajan (uncredited)
- Sujatha as Bhagyam
- Ambika as Uma, Selvanayagam's daughter
- Swapna as Devi, Dhanakodi's daughter
- Sukumari as Annapoorani, Sivaanandham's wife
- K. A. Thangavelu as Mudhaliyar, Selvanayagam's accountant
- Nagesh as Peter
- Thengai Srinivasan as Sivaanandham, Selvanayagam's brother
- Suman as Sekhar
- Sangili Murugan as Dhanakodi
- K. Kannan as Vadivelu
- Nizhalgal Ravi as Ravi, Sivaanandham's son
- G. Srinivasan in a cameo appearance as Nachimuthu
- V. Gopalakrishnan in a cameo appearance as a lawyer
- A.R.S as a loan officer
- Pandu as Vadivelu's sidekick
- R. M. Sethupathi as Rajan's employer

== Production ==
The makeup for old look of Kamal Haasan was done by R. Sundaramoorthy who revealed the look is inspired from a character from the 1980 film Babylon.

== Soundtrack ==
The music was composed by Ilaiyaraaja. The song "Endrendrum Anandhame" is set to Sarasangi, a Carnatic raga.

Track listing
No.	Title	Lyrics	Singer(s)	Length
1.	"Madini Madini"	Gangai Amaran	P. Susheela, Malaysia Vasudevan & Chorus
2.	"Thaalattudhe Vaanam"	Kannadasan	P. Jayachandran, S. Janaki
3.	"Endrendrum Anandhame"	Panchu Arunachalam	Malaysia Vasudevan
4.	"Kalai Maane"	Kannadasan	P. Susheela

== Critical reception ==
Sindhu-Jeeva of Kalki praised Kamal Haasan's acting, Viswanathan's cinematography and Ilaiyaraaja's music but felt unit who worked a lot in the idea of taking gold and making jewellery not realising it is just clay and concluded Meen (fish) in Malayalam, Karuvadu (dried fish) in Tamil.
