= Ellam Inba Mayyam =

1981 film directed by G. N. Rangarajan

- Theatrical release poster
- Directed by: G. N. Rangarajan
- Written by: Panchu Arunachalam
- Produced by: Meena Panchu Arunachalam
- Starring: Kamal Haasan; Jaishankar; Suman; Maadhavi; Surekha
- Cinematography: N. K. Viswanathan
- Edited by: K. R. Ramalingam
- Music by: Ilaiyaraaja
- Production company: P. A. Art Productions
- Release date: 5 December 1981
- Country: India
- Language: Tamil

Ellam Inba Mayyam (transl. Everything is happiness) is a 1981 Indian Tamil-language film directed by G. N. Rangarajan and written by Panchu Arunachalam. The film stars Kamal Haasan, Jaishankar, Suman, Maadhavi and Surekha. It was released on 5 December 1981.

== Plot ==
Pazhani and Velu, two country bumpkins, arrive at Chennai in search of a job. They end up getting conned the very first day and lose all their meager possessions. The next day, each man decides to go his own way in search of a job, and both agree to meet up in the evening to share prospects. Velu manages to enter the service of Kailasa Mudaliyar who is a building contractor and eventually becomes his personal servant. Meanwhile, Pazhani gets a job at a hotel and eventually starts to develop feelings for his boss's daughter Savitri. Although Pazhani picks up the knack of living in a city, Velu remains the same old innocent fellow, loyal to his employer.

A businessman visits Mudaliyar and brings with him illegal gold biscuits worth ₹12 lakh (equivalent to ₹2.7 crore or US$280,000 in 2026). Mudaliyar warns the businessman about venturing out with the gold and asks him to stay in his house. Later that day, Mudaliyar steals gold worth ₹10 lakh (equivalent to ₹2.2 crore or US$230,000 in 2026) when the businessman is away. Velu is unaware of all the dealings and goes about doing his household chores. The next day, Mudaliyar rushes the businessman to make a quick deal with a buyer; when he seems too nervous to do it, he sends Velu instead to deliver the remaining gold worth ₹2 lakh (equivalent to ₹45 lakh or US$46,000 in 2026) and get the cash. The innocent Velu, who is unaware of the trap, proceeds to fulfill his employer's command. Meanwhile, Mudaliyar calls the police and informs them about Velu in the car with the gold. Policemen give chase and catch up with Velu. When they trace the car back to Mudaliyar, he pretends innocence and tricks Velu into owning up for the crime. Velu takes the blame, hoping Mudaliyar will save him. Instead, he is sentenced to three years in prison. It is only then that he realises that he has been cheated by his employer.

While Velu is lamenting in prison, Mudaliyar has started an Export Import business through which he gains fame and riches. In prison, Velu is mentored by a fellow convict. At the end of the term, he emerges as a completely reformed man who is ready to take on Mudaliyar. His old friend Pazhani meets him outside the prison complex and takes him home. Pazhani who is now married to Savitri introduces Velu to his wife and sister-in-law Gomathi. Velu goes to meet Mudaliyar and demands half of his fortune. When Mudaliyar refuses, Velu challenges him that he will extract what is rightfully due to him.

Mudaliyar celebrates his fiftieth birthday by throwing a grand party for over a thousand guests. Velu learns of this and challenges Mudaliyar that he will humiliate him by wrecking the party. He arrives at the event dressed as a dancer and with Pazhani's help successfully starts a brawl between two guests, thereby leading to commotion at the event. Newspapers humiliate Mudaliyar by reporting the event in detail.

Mudaliyar's son Sukumar returns from abroad. Velu proposes his next challenge to Mudaliyar; he vows to pit father against son. Mudaliyar warns Sukumar about Velu and his motives. Meanwhile, Velu begins preparations to get Sukumar to fall for Gomathi. Gomathi and Velu pose as a poor, slum-dwelling daughter and father (Muniamma and Mari) to Sukumar. He develops feelings for Muniamma and proposes marriage to her; Mari asks him to get his father's consent first. To no one's surprise, Mudaliyar refuses to grant his blessings and Sukumar angrily storms out of the house. He tells Mari about his dad's refusal. Mari encourages him to see a lawyer, who is Velu again in a Brahmin lawyer's garb. Velu incognito as the lawyer, pays Mudaliyar a visit and coerces him into accepting his son's marriage with Muniamma. Mudaliyar gives in and the couple is united.

Velu poses his next challenge to Mudaliyar, he now vows to pit daughter against father. Fearing him, Mudaliyar tries to get his daughter Madhavi married before Velu can reach her. However, she has decided that she will marry only a simple fool who will not impinge upon her freedom and independence after marriage. Velu hears this and hatches a plan along with Manorama and K. A. Thangavelu (in cameos). He approaches Madhavi posing as the slightly retarded Basavappa with the veterans acting as his parents. Madhavi takes a genuine liking for the innocent Basavappa and lets her father know about her intention to marry him. Mudaliyar, who is intent on escaping Velu, almost falls for the scam, but is alerted due to a small mistake on Velu's part. He immediately exposes Basavappa as Velu in disguise. Madhavi is furious and gives Velu the boot, but later realises that she still harbours feelings for Velu and makes it up with him.

Mudaliyar and Velu clash with each other again and the former decides to hire a notorious thug, Rowdy Rakkappan to deliver Velu's chopped leg, in order to fulfill his challenge to Velu. He sends his secretary to fetch Rakkappan. Velu, again in the guise of the rowdy, manages to fool both Mudaliyar and his secretary and sets out to get Velu's leg. He later returns in the thick of night and tells Mudaliyar that he accidentally killed Velu and shows a severed head as proof. Mudaliyar, fearing the repercussions of this murder, hurriedly sends Rakkappan out of his house. Later he is haunted by Velu's ghost (in a mock-up of Dracula).

The terrified Mudaliyar confesses the crime to his secretary, who accidentally sees Velu up and about and realises that the entire episode of Velu's murder was a sham to trick Mudaliyar in the first place. He reports this back to Mudaliyar, who approaches the actual rowdy Rakkappan and arranges for him to kill Velu. Madhavi who hears about this plan appeals to her father to see reason that Velu had not actually harmed him and was only demanding the share of money due to him, albeit in a different way. When his daughter-in-law Gomathi reaffirms that she is a graduate from a respectable family, he realises that Velu had indeed not done anything wrong and sets out with his daughter to stop Rakkappan. But by the time they get to the hideout, Rakkappan stabs Velu. A distraught Mudaliyar confesses to his past mistakes and declares that he will donate his fortune to charity, at which point Velu rises and reveals that his stabbing is yet another trick to force Mudaliyar to reveal his real self. Velu is reunited with Madhavi and all are happy.

== Cast ==
- Kamal Haasan as Velusamy
- Jaishankar as Kailasa Mudhaliyar
- Suman as Mohan
- Madhavi as Madhavi
- Surekha as Gomathi, Mohan's wife
- Manorama
- Kavitha as (guest appearance)
- Thengai Srinivasan as Naidu
- K. A. Thangavelu
- Y. G. Mahendran as Pazhani
- Typist Gopu
- K. S. Jayalakshmi

== Production ==
Kamal Haasan sported at least seven different getups in the film.

== Soundtrack ==
The music was composed by Ilaiyaraaja, while the lyrics were written by Panchu Arunachalam. The song "Solla Solla Enna Perumai" belongs to the funk rock fusion genre. The song "Maaman Veedu" is set to the raga Bilahari.

Track listing
No.	Title	Singer(s)	Length
1.	"Barla Barla"	Malaysia Vasudevan
2.	"Solla Solla Enna Perumai"	S. P. Balasubrahmanyam
3.	"Maaman Veedu"	Malaysia Vasudevan
4.	"Onnum Onnum Rendu"	Ilaiyaraaja, S. Janaki and chorus

== Reception ==
Sindhu Jeeva of Kalki said Haasan dominated the film throughout. Nachi of Pesum Padam praised Haasan for making viewers laugh with his various disguises but found his dialogues difficult to understand and slippery and also praised Rangarajan for handling slapstick humor well.

== Bibliography ==
- Beaster-Jones, Jayson; Sarrazin, Natalie, eds. (2016). Music in Contemporary Indian Film: Memory, Voice, Identity. Taylor & Francis. ISBN 978-1-317-39970-4.
