= Meendum Kokila =

- Theatrical poster
- Directed by: G. N. Rangarajan
- Screenplay by: Ananthu
- Story by: Haasan Brothers
- Produced by: T. R. Srinivasan
- Starring: Kamal Haasan; Sridevi; Deepa
- Cinematography: N. K. Viswanathan
- Edited by: K. R. Ramalingam
- Music by: Ilaiyaraaja
- Production company: Charuchitra Films
- Release date: 14 January 1981
- Running time: 139 minutes
- Country: India
- Language: Tamil

Meendum Kokila (transl. Kokila, again) is a 1981 Indian Tamil-language romantic comedy film directed by G. N. Rangarajan from a screenplay written by Ananthu and a story by the Haasan Brothers. The film stars Kamal Haasan and Sridevi. Deepa, Suruli Rajan, Thengai Srinivasan and Omakuchi Narasimhan are featured in supporting roles. The narrative follows a young woman who fights to win back her husband after his infatuation with an actress.

Meendum Kokila was released theatrically on 14 January 1981. Upon its release, the film was a critical and commercial success. For her performance, Sridevi received the Filmfare Award for Best Actress – Tamil. The film was dubbed in Telugu as Chilipi Mogudu and released on 4 September 1981.

== Plot ==
Subramaniam, a lawyer, is married to Kokila and has a daughter. Things go well until he meets Kamini, a movie star, at a party. He gets attracted to Kamini and becomes ready to sacrifice his own family for her. Kokila's efforts in bringing back her husband form the rest of the story.

== Cast ==
- Kamal Haasan as Subramaniam
- Sridevi as Kokila
- Deepa as Kamini
- Suruli Rajan as Film Director
- S. N. Parvathy as Neighbour
- A. R. Srinivasan as Auditor
- "Nagesh" Krishnamurthy as Moorthy
- Baby Anju as Manju Subramaniam
- Thengai Srinivasan as Nattuvanar
- T. K. S. Natarajan as Film Star

== Production ==
The film was originally directed by Mahendran with Sridevi, Kamal Haasan and Bollywood actress Rekha—in her Tamil cinema debut—playing the lead roles. Rekha was the original choice for the role of Kamini, and scenes featuring her were shot till 3000 feet. Mahendran opted out of the film after a song sequence was shot. Later, as the film progressed, Rekha pulled out, citing no reason. It was Haasan who requested G. N. Rangarajan to take over the film as director. Rekha's father Gemini Ganesan claimed he told her not to play "second fiddle" to Sridevi. Rekha was replaced by Deepa. Haasan's character in the film twitches his eye, for which he took inspiration from cricketer Krishnamachari Srikkanth. After the film was screen for the Central Board of Film Certification, Rangarajan feared it would be given an A (adults only) certificate, but to his relief it was given U (unrestricted) without any cuts.

== Soundtrack ==
The music was composed by Ilaiyaraaja. The song "Radha Radha Nee" is set in the raga Shuddha Saveri whereas "Chinnan Chiru Vayathil" is set in Abheri. For the dubbed Telugu version Chilipi Mogudu, lyrics were written by Rajasri and Aarudra.

Tamil

Song	Singers	Lyrics	Length
"Chinna Chiru Vayathil"	K. J. Yesudas, S. P. Sailaja	Kannadasan	04:32
"Hey Oraiyiram"	S. P. Balasubrahmanyam	Panchu Arunachalam	03:55
"Ponnana Meni"	K. J. Yesudas, S. Janaki	Panchu Arunachalam	04:30
"Radha Radha Nee"	S. P. Balasubrahmanyam, S. Janaki	Kannadasan	04:27

Telugu

Song	Singers	Lyrics	Length
"Ninna Sandhya Velalo"	S. P. Balasubrahmanyam, S. P. Sailaja	Rajasri	03:20
"Radha Radha – Duet"	S. P. Balasubrahmanyam, P. Susheela	Rajasri	03:26
"Oh Chinna Maata"	G. Anand, S. P. Sailaja	Rajasri	03:22
"Hey Oorinchaku"	S. P. Balasubrahmanyam	Aarudhra	02:56

== Reception ==
Nalini Sastry of Kalki lauded Rangarajan's direction, Ananthu's dialogues, Viswanathan's cinematography and the performances of the main cast. Sridevi received the Filmfare Award for Best Actress – Tamil; the first of her four Filmfare Awards. Just 17 years old, when released, the film's success consolidated Sridevi's position as the highest paid actress in South Indian cinema.

== Re-release ==
The film's digitally restored version was released on 15 December 2017.
