= Bhuvana Oru Kelvi Kuri =

1977 film by S. P. Muthuraman

- Theatrical release poster
- Directed by: S. P. Muthuraman
- Screenplay by: Panchu Arunachalam
- Based on: Bhuvana Oru Kelvi Kuri by Maharishi
- Produced by: N. S. Mani
- Starring: Sivakumar; Rajinikanth; Sumithra
- Cinematography: Babu
- Edited by: R. Vittal
- Music by: Ilaiyaraaja
- Production company: M. A. M. Films
- Release date: 2 September 1977
- Running time: 146 minutes
- Country: India
- Language: Tamil

Bhuvana Oru Kelvi Kuri (transl. Bhuvana is a question mark) is a 1977 Indian Tamil-language drama film directed by S. P. Muthuraman and written by Panchu Arunachalam. It is based on the novel of the same name by Maharishi. The film stars Sivakumar, Rajinikanth and Sumithra. It focuses on two friends with conflicting characters and their conflicting lives.

Bhuvana Oru Kelvi Kuri was notable for casting Rajinikanth and Sivakumar as a hero and antihero respectively, contrary to the roles they played in earlier films. It was released on 2 September 1977. The film shocked audiences who were used to seeing Rajinikanth and Sivakumar in their usual roles; nevertheless, it was a commercial success, and won two Filmfare Awards: Best Tamil Film and Best Tamil Director for Muthuraman. The success of Bhuvana Oru Kelvi Kuri led to Rajinikanth playing more positive roles in films.

== Plot ==
Nagaraj and Sampath are garment salesmen and roommates in Nagercoil. While Sampath is a straightforward person who believes in honesty, Nagaraj is a womaniser, in contrast to Sampath who believes in true love. Sampath's lover Raji, while fleeing from a rogue bull, dies due to an accident. A depressed Sampath attempts suicide, but Nagaraj stops him, and Sampath decides to stop selling garments, instead confining himself to remaining Nagaraj's assistant.

Aboard a train bound for Madras, Nagaraj and Sampath encounter Muthu, a temple trust clerk who has a suitcase full of cash. But Muthu dies en route of a heart attack and Nagaraj steals his suitcase, over Sampath's objections. Muthu's sister Bhuvana visits them at Nagercoil to enquire about the lost cash (which is all black money). Nagaraj denies knowing anything, but Bhuvana remains suspicious. He pretends to love her; Bhuvana falls for his lust and has sex with him.

Nagaraj uses some of the black money to open his own garment store. To make the rest of the money legitimate, he decides to marry Manohari, the daughter of a wealthy businessman. Bhuvana, pregnant by Nagaraj, refuses to abort the baby and wants Nagaraj to marry her, but he refuses. To save Bhuvana's honour and help his friend, Sampath marries Bhuvana but they only share a platonic relationship, while Nagaraj marries Manohari and his business flourishes.

Sampath wants to have a physical relationship with Bhuvana but she rejects him, saying he is like a god to her. Sampath raises Bhuvana's son as his own. Meanwhile, Nagarajan and Manohari yearn for a child as the former has now become impotent due to his excessive libido. Nagaraj demands that his son be given to him for adoption but Bhuvana refuses.

When the child becomes ill and needs an injection, Nagaraj enters into a bargain that he would give the medicine from his pharmacy, provided it is agreed that the child is given to him in adoption. However, Sampath arrives on time to deliver the injection and the child is saved. A short while later, Sampath succumbs to cardiac arrest, the result of years of excessive smoking and drinking. Bhuvana prefers to live as his widow.

== Cast ==
- Sivakumar as Nagaraj
- Rajinikanth as Sampath
- Sumithra as Bhuvana
- Jaya as Manohari
- Meera as Raaji
- Suruli Rajan as Manohari's father
- Y. G. Mahendran as Muthu

== Production ==
Writer Panchu Arunachalam and director S. P. Muthuraman initially wanted Rajinikanth to play a small role in a low-budget film. (Note: While Muthuraman stated in 1999 that the film was Avalukku Oru Aasai, he contradicted himself in a later interview with The Hindu's Malathi Rangarajan, stating it to be Aan Singam.) But after meeting him, the duo found him to have "brightness" and decided to cast him in "something bigger, better". The film was Bhuvana Oru Kelvi Kuri, an adaptation of the novel of the same name by Maharishi. Produced by N. S. Mani under the banner M. A. M. Films who earlier worked as production controller for AVM Productions, its screenplay was written by Arunachalam. The film was the first collaboration of Rajinikanth and Muthuraman, and was conceived during the Emergency.

The film had a role swap as Sivakumar, then known for playing clean and positive characters, played an antihero while Rajinikanth, then an established villain, played a positive character Sampath. Muthuraman said he deliberately cast Rajinikanth against type since he wanted to "experiment with his acting skills". He also explained that his decision to shoot the film in black-and-white, rather than colour, was to save costs. Since Rajinikanth was not fluent in Tamil at that time, he was trained by S. L. Narayanan, who was popularly known by the prefix "Vaadhyar".

Cinematography was handled by Babu. Some scenes were filmed in Panagudi, Tirunelveli. A group song was shot in Tada area and it was decided that the song sequence could be shot in one day but due to a technical fault in the playback equipment which occurred when the half of the song scene was over, it was not possible to continue the shooting, the crew had no other option but to stay there for the night and finish the shoot next day. The film was initially shot with the ending of Sampath and Bhuvana (Sumithra) marrying; however after watching the preview, Muthuraman felt Bhuvana's purity seemed to have been spoiled when she was allowed to live together so the team discussed together various endings and half-heartedly agreed to the conclusion of Bhuvana living a widow's life after Sampath's death which was well received by audience. The film was edited by R. Vittal, and its final length measured 3,976.12 metres (13,045.0 ft).

== Soundtrack ==
Ilaiyaraaja composed the music and Panchu Arunachalam wrote the lyrics. The song "Vizhiyile" is set in the Carnatic raga known as Natabhairavi, and "Poonthendrale" is set in Rageshree. In June 2013, A. Muthusamy of Honey Bee Music released a 5.1 surround sound version of the soundtrack.

Track listing
No.	Title	Singer(s)	Length
1.	"Vizhiyile"	S. P. Balasubrahmanyam	4:24
2.	"Raja Enbar"	S. P. Balasubrahmanyam, S. Janaki	4:32
3.	"Poonthendrale"	P. Jayachandran, Vani Jairam	4:08
4.	"Theme" (Instrumental)	—	2:05
Total length:			15:09

== Release and reception ==
Bhuvana Oru Kelvi Kuri was released on 2 September 1977. The film shocked audiences who were used to seeing Rajinikanth in negative roles, and Sivakumar in heroic roles. Nevertheless, it won the Filmfare Award for Best Tamil Film and Muthuraman won the Best Tamil Director award at the same ceremony. Rajinikanth's performance earned him the Thirai Kathir Award for Best Supporting Actor. In 1978, the critic from Film World stated that although Bhuvana Oru Kelvi Kuri dealt with social questions, it "neither had the motivation nor the justification very much essential to make a film realistic; at best [it] appeared frivolous." Anna praised the performances of the cast, dialogues and direction but panned the humour and music.

== Legacy ==
The success of Bhuvana Oru Kelvi Kuri paved way for Rajinikanth the opportunity to do more hero oriented films. Although Sivakumar's fans disliked seeing him play a negative character, he received numerous offers to play negative roles following this film's success, and felt accepting to play Nagaraj was a mistake; he elaborated, "I do not wish to be typed either as a goody- goody leading man or a villain. I would like to act all types of roles." Muthuraman called it one of the favourite films he had directed. Film producer and writer G. Dhananjayan wrote that it is one of five films Rajinikanth considers "close to his heart"; the other four are Mullum Malarum (1978), Aarilirunthu Arubathu Varai (1979) and Enkeyo Ketta Kural (1982) and Sri Raghavendrar (1985).

== Bibliography ==
- Ramachandran, Naman, ed. (2012). Rajinikanth 12.12.12: A Birthday Special. Kasturi & Sons Ltd.
- Ramachandran, Naman (2014) [2012]. Rajinikanth: The Definitive Biography. New Delhi: Penguin Books. ISBN 978-0-14-342111-5.
- Sundararaman (2007) [2005]. Raga Chintamani: A Guide to Carnatic Ragas Through Tamil Film Music (2nd ed.). Chennai: Pichhamal Chintamani. OCLC 295034757.
- Muthuraman, S. P. (2017) [2005]. AVM Thandha SPM (in Tamil) (3rd ed.). Vikatan. OCLC 607342391.
