= Baalu Jenu =

1976 film directed by Balan and Kunigal Nagabhushan

- Poster
- Directed by: Balan; Kunigal Nagabhushan
- Screenplay by: Nagabhushan
- Based on: Mayangukiral Oru Maadhu
- Produced by: K. R. Ravichandran
- Starring: Aarathi; Gangadhar; Ramgopal; Rajinikanth; Udaya Chandrika; Pandari Bai
- Cinematography: T. M. Sundara Babu
- Edited by: P. K. Krishnan
- Music by: G. K. Venkatesh
- Production company: S G S Films
- Release date: 10 December 1976
- Running time: 131 minutes
- Country: India
- Language: Kannada

Baalu Jenu ( transl. Life is honey) is a 1976 Indian Kannada-language film directed by Balan and Kunigal Nagabhushan. It is a remake of the 1976 Tamil film Mayangukiral Oru Maadhu. The film stars Aarathi, Gangadhar, Ramgopal, Rajinikanth, Udaya Chandrika and Pandari Bai. In Baalu Jenu, a married woman must try to keep a one-night stand that she had in college a secret from her husband, and thwart a persistent blackmailer intent on collecting money from her to keep quiet about it. It was released on 10 December 1976, and became a commercial success.

== Plot ==
Geetha, a college student in Mysore, has a one-night stand with her rich boy friend Chandru. Unfortunately Chandru gets arrested on suspicion of abetting his industrialist father in smuggling and is sentenced to five years in prison. Geetha tries to find Chandru and when her efforts prove futile, consumes poison. Her hostel roommate Revathi and a doctor save her on time. After Geetha graduates, her marriage is arranged; to her surprise, the prospective groom's elder sister is the same doctor who saved her life and knows her secret. The doctor wholeheartedly recommends Geetha for her brother Ravi, a wealthy businessman. Ravi and Geetha get married and have a child.

Some years later, Geetha runs into Revathi at a sari shop. Revathi is married to Vasu, a photographer, and they too have a child. Vasu is the same photographer who had earlier blackmailed Chandru's father with pictures of him in the act of smuggling. When Revathi and Vasu visit Ravi and Geetha, Vasu takes some family photographs. While developing the pictures, Vasu recognizes Geetha's features; he recalls having clicked Geetha and Chandru during their one-night stand.

Chandru is released from prison, and to Geetha's horror, Ravi hires him as their driver. Vasu begins blackmailing Geetha and his financial demands increase. He also has altercations with Chandru. Geetha cannot cope with the mental and financial strain; she has a breakdown and is hospitalised. Chandru raids Vasu's dark room hoping to retrieve the damning negatives. In the ensuing fracas, Revathi bursts in and threatens to immolate herself and her child. Faced with the threat of losing his family before his very eyes, Vasu destroys the incriminating negatives. At the hospital, Ravi tells Geetha that he had full knowledge of the Chandru affair all along.

== Cast ==
- Aarathi as Geetha
- Gangadhar as Ravi
- Ramgopal as Chandru
- Rajinikanth as Vasu
- Udaya Chandrika as Revathi
- Pandari Bai as the doctor
- Rajanand as Rajanand, Chandru's father
- Kunigal Ramanath
- Meena Kuttappa
- Shanthamma
- Jayamalini
- Rajesh (credited as Master Rajesh) as Bharath, Geetha's son
- Rani (credited as Baby Rani) as Vasu's daughter

== Production ==
Baalu Jenu is a remake of the 1976 Tamil film Mayangukiral Oru Maadhu. It was directed by Balan and Kunigal Nagabhushan, and produced by K. R. Ravichandran under S.G.S Films. Co-director Nagabhushan also wrote the screenplay. Cinematography was handled by T. M. Sundara Babu, and editing by P. K. Krishnan. Rajinikanth, after watching Thengai Srinivasan's performance in the original film as a blackmailing photographer, expressed his desire to reprise that role and got it. Baalu Jenu was also the first film where a character played by Rajinikanth had a major onscreen fight sequence.

== Themes ==
Film critic Naman Ramachandran noted numerous parallels between Rajinikanth's character Vasu in Baalu Jenu and his character Prasad in Moondru Mudichu (1976). He also compared it to many other earlier Rajinikanth films such as Apoorva Raagangal (1975), Munithaayi (a segment of the 1976 anthology film Katha Sangama), Anthuleni Katha (1976) and Moondru Mudichu due to the fact that they focused on a central female character.

== Soundtrack ==
The soundtrack was composed by G. K. Venkatesh.

Track listing
No.	Title	Lyrics	Singer(s)	Length
1.	"Aase Aralide"	Kunigal Nagabhushan	S. Janaki	3:45
2.	"Madhura Balu Madhura"	R. N. Jayagopal	K. J. Yesudas, S. Janaki	4:38
3.	"Onde Ondu Katheya Heluve"	R. N. Jayagopal	S. Janaki	4:27
4.	"Samsaarada Santoshave"	R. N. Jayagopal	S. P. Balasubrahmanyam	4:25
Total length:				17:15

== Release ==
Baalu Jenu was released on 10 December 1976. The film became a commercial success, and Rajinikanth went on to play more negative roles in films.

== See also ==
- Yavvanam Katesindi
- Bezubaan

== Bibliography ==
- Ramachandran, Naman (2014) [2012]. Rajinikanth: The Definitive Biography. New Delhi: Penguin Books. ISBN 978-0-14-342111-5.
