= Kazhugu (1981 film) =

1981 film by SP. Muthuraman

- Poster
- Directed by: S. P. Muthuraman
- Written by: Panchu Arunachalam
- Produced by: Meena Panju Arunachalam
- Starring: Rajinikanth; Rati Agnihotri; Sumalatha
- Cinematography: Babu
- Edited by: R. Vittal
- Music by: Ilaiyaraaja
- Production company: P. A. Art Productions
- Release date: 6 March 1981
- Running time: 139 minutes
- Country: India
- Language: Tamil

Kazhugu (transl. Eagle) is a 1981 Indian Tamil-language action film written by Panchu Arunachalam and directed by S. P. Muthuraman, starring Rajinikanth, Rati Agnihotri and Sumalatha. Upon release on 6 March 1981, the film, which revolved around hypnotism and human sacrifice did not go well with the audience, and it became an average grosser. It is inspired by the 1975 American film Race with the Devil.

== Plot ==
Satyamoorthy is a wealthy diamond businessman and widower who lives with his younger brother Raja (Rajinikanth) and his two daughters Radha and Chitra. Satyamoorthy is a great devotee of saints and priests and trusts the authenticity of all of them, while Raja is a happy-go-lucky guy, just the opposite of his brother, who trusts none of them. On one occasion, Satyamoorthy invites a priest to his house to perform rituals to drive away the evil that surrounds his house, unaware that the priest is an impostor and a member of a gang of thieves. Satyamoorthy takes him to the treasure room, where he had stored his vast riches, and tells him the secret to opening his lockers. The false priest pretends to give him a sacred sheet and orders him to place it inside the locker to protect his things. As Raja suspected, the priest sends thieves in the night to plunder the wealth, but Raja wakes up and fights them and restores the plundered property. Raja's repeated attempts to prove the priest false are in vain, as Satyamoorthy firmly believes that Raja protected the riches only because of the divine power of the holy shroud.

On one occasion, Raja mistakenly enters a ladies' room and is surprised by a girl who shouts that Raja has come to misbehave. Raja wants revenge for her behavior towards him and goes to her father Sivaraman and lies to him that he is the lover of his daughter Hemavathy (Rati Agnihotri) alias Hema. Sivaraman believes him and stops all Hema's outings. Hema gets angry and goes to Raja to reveal the truth to her father. Hema explains to him that once a man entered the ladies washroom and tried to rape her and that is the reason for her behavior with him that day. Understanding Hema's situation, Raja tells the truth to Sivaraman. This brings Raja and Hema together and both fall in love and get married.

As a wedding gift, Satyamoorthy presents his brother with an RV for their honeymoon. Raja and Hema go on their honeymoon with Raja's friends. After a few days, Raja and his friends camp at a place near a small village. They receive help and assistance from an innocent villager Vasanthi (Vanitha Krishnachandran), a vegetable vendor. A few days later, at night, Raja's group hears the sound of a drum. Raja and his friend follow the sound which ends in a sacrificial field and the sacrifice of Vasanthi by a group of people. Raja screams at the sight of Vasanthi being beheaded and alerts the men. They were chased by the men and Raja escapes with his group from them. The next day, Raja goes to the police station and reports the incident. On police investigation, Raja is shocked to learn that there was no evidence of the existence of the Vasanthi girl.

Raja's men were tortured and Raja lost one of his friends. Raja goes into a deep investigation and ends up at a place of a Rajarishi (Sangili Murugan) who is believed to be a great saint. Raja meets his brother and father-in-law on their visit to Rajarishi and Raja goes with them. Raja discovers that Rajarishi is not a saint, but a great looter and head of a gang of thieves who makes rich people surrender their property to him by giving them a sacred drink called "Anandha Rasam", which is actually a mixture of alcohol. Radha, Satyamoorthy's daughter, is declared dead from a snake bite. But the girl is not dead and is made to believe that she has died as she is wanted by Rajarishi for a ritual of human sacrifice. Raja follows the Rajarishi's men and finds his niece in a trance-like state obeying everything Rajarishi says. When Rajarishi is about to behead her Raja rescues her and flees the place. Raja is followed by the whole village and Raja escapes in his bus. Finally Raja gets into a big fight with Rajarishi's men and reveals the truth to everyone. The police finally arrest Rajarishi and his men for their illegal crimes.

== Cast ==
- Rajinikanth as Rajasekar
- Rati Agnihotri as Hema
- Sangili Murugan as Rajarishi
- Thengai Srinivasan as Sathiyamoorthy
- Y. G. Mahendran as Gopi
- V. K. Ramasamy as Sivaraman
- Suruli Rajan as Rajarishi's Sishyan
- Cho Ramaswamy as Ramasamy
- Sumalatha as Suma
- Ramanathan as Raja's friend
- Senthamarai as Inspector of police
- S. V. Ramadas as Mahadevan
- K. Kannan as Henchman of rajarishi
- Vanitha Krishnachandran as Vasanthi
- S.L. Narayanan

== Production ==
Since a bus plays an pivotal role in the film's story, Panchu Arunachalam's brother Lakshmanan and art director Babu bought a bus from Bangalore. This bus had been built for the film resembling a caravan which had many facilities like kitchen, bathroom, bedroom, mini parking area.

== Soundtrack ==
The music was composed by Ilaiyaraaja, with lyrics by Panchu Arunachalam.

Track listing
No.	Title	Singer(s)	Length
1.	"Kadhal Ennum Kovil"	Soolamangalam Murali	4:37
2.	"Oru Poovanathile"	S. P. Balasubrahmanyam	4:24
3.	"Ponnoviyam Kandenamma"	Ilaiyaraaja, S. Janaki	4:06
4.	"Thedum Deivam"	Malaysia Vasudevan, S. Janaki	4:40
5.	"Thrill Music" (instrumental)	–	3:38

== Release and reception ==
Kazhugu was released on 6 March 1981. Nalini Sastry of Kalki praised Babu's cinematography, Ilaiyaraaja's music, the sound effects in fight choreography and also added since the film is inspired from Race with the Devil, it offers a new experience and sustains the interest despite being cinematic. The film failed at the box office as the offbeat theme was not appreciated by fans of Rajinikanth. Director S. P. Muthuraman felt the concept of caravan and investigative journalism was alien to Tamil audience that time which could have been the reasons for the film's failure. In the book Rajinikanth: The Definitive Biography, he is quoted as saying, "We bought a bus and created a caravan that became a character in the film. It was a different film, but the audience really didn't understand it".
