= Lights, Camera, Action =

Lights, Camera, Action, the traditional cue to a silent film crew at the beginning of a take, may refer to:

== Games ==
- Lights...Camera...Action! (pinball) 1989 pinball game
- Animaniacs: Lights, Camera, Action!, a 2005 video game for the Nintendo DS and Game Boy Advance
- Scene It? Lights, Camera, Action, a 2007 movie trivia video game for the Xbox 360

== Film and television ==
- Standby...Lights! Camera! Action!, a 1980s television series
- "Lights, Camera, Action", the third season of the television show The Wiggles

== Music ==
- "Lights, Camera, Action!" (Mr. Cheeks song), 2001
- "Lights Camera Action" (Kylie Minogue song), 2024
- Lights, Camera, Action, an album by Chico Slimani
- "Lights, Camera, Action", a song by Remy Ma from There's Something About Remy: Based on a True Story

== Other uses ==
- Lights! Camera! Action! Hosted by Steven Spielberg, a show attraction located in Universal Studios Singapore
- Lights, Camera, Action, a novel in the High School Musical book series

== See also ==
- Lights, Camera, Masala, a book about Indian cinema by Naman Ramachandran
- Lights, Motors, Action!: Extreme Stunt Show, a live stunt show performed at Walt Disney Studios Park
