= Halli Rambhe Belli Bombe =

- Directed by: M. S. Rajashekar
- Screenplay by: M. S. Rajashekar
- Story by: Panchu Arunachalam
- Based on: Manamagale Vaa (Tamil)
- Produced by: M. P. Shankar
- Starring: Chi. Guru Dutt; Malashri; Umashree; Ravikiran
- Cinematography: V. K. Kannan
- Edited by: S. Manohar
- Music by: Upendra Kumar
- Production company: Bharani Chithra
- Release date: 7 October 1991
- Running time: 137 minutes
- Country: India
- Language: Kannada

Halli Rambhe Belli Bombe (transl. Village Beauty Silver doll) is a 1991 Indian Kannada-language romantic comedy film directed by M. S. Rajashekar, based on the 1988 Tamil film Manamagale Vaa and produced by M. P. Shankar. The film stars Malashri and Chi. Guru Dutt. The film had cinematography by V. K. Kannan and the dialogues and lyrics are written by Chi. Udaya Shankar who also enacted in a supporting role. The film's music was composed by Upendra Kumar.

== Cast ==
- Malashri
- Chi. Guru Dutt
- Chi. Udaya Shankar
- M. P. Shankar
- Girija Lokesh
- Ravikiran
- Shivaram
- Umashree
- Balakrishna
- B.V. Rajashekar
- Sudheer
- Sihi Kahi Chandru
- Honnavalli Krishna
- Agro Chikkanna
- Kaminidharan
- Rekha Das

== Soundtrack ==
The music of the film was composed by Upendra Kumar with lyrics by Chi. Udaya Shankar.

Track listing
No.	Title	Lyrics	Singer(s)	Length
1.	"Andu Ninna Seridaga"	Chi. Udaya Shankar	S. P. Balasubrahmanyam, Chorus	04:29
2.	"Eko Kaane Nange Nachike"	Chi. Udaya Shankar	S. P. Balasubrahmanyam, S. Janaki	04:53
3.	"Halli Rambhe Anthare"	Chi. Udaya Shankar	S. Janaki	03:55
4.	"Rama Ennalenu"	Chi. Udaya Shankar	S. Janaki	04:37
5.	"O Chandrane Baaro Bega"	Chi. Udaya Shankar	S. P. Balasubrahmanyam	04:51
Total length:				22:45
