= Divya Thakur =

Indian interior architect

- Born: 1971 (age 54–55)
- Education: Sir J.J. Institute of Applied Arts (BFA)
- Occupations: Interior architect Designer; Creative director of Design Temple (established 1999)
- Years active: 1999–
- Known for: Interior architecture
- Notable work: Design Temple
- Website: divyathakur.com

Divya Thakur (born 1971) is an Indian designer and interior architect who is the founder and creative director of Design Temple, a boutique design firm. Described by The New York Times as "often modern and sometimes kitschy", her work in design focuses on incorporating elements from the culture of India.

Thakur's work spans from film posters including The Namesake and The Reluctant Fundamentalist; book covers, such as Naman Ramachandran's Lights, Camera, Masala; to designs for brands including Asian Paints and Taj Hotels. Her art installations have been featured in exhibitions throughout India and internationally, including in the Millesgården in Stockholm and the Victoria and Albert Museum in London.

== Early life and education ==
Thakur was born in 1971. Her father, Umesh Chandra Thakur, is a former Indian Army major, and her mother, Prema Thakur, is a former school principal. As a student at St. Kabir Public School in Chandigarh, India, Thakur won her first design award. She later attended the Welham Girls’ School in the state of Uttarakhand.

Thakur obtained her Bachelor of Fine Arts from the Sir J.J. Institute of Applied Arts. She has taken various design courses at Central Saint Martins, the London College of Fashion, the Pratt Institute.

== Career ==
Thakur established Design Temple in 1999, originally offering design work relating to home accessories and furniture.

In 2004, she hosted her first exhibition, "India Indigenous," at Loggia dei Mercanti.

Her 2016 installation, "Design: The India Story" at the Chhatrapati Shivaji Maharaj Vastu Sangrahalaya, traced the history of the architecture of India. It attracted approximately 250,000 visitors. In Elle, Aditi Sharma Maheshwari described the installation as having "delved deep into the products made by homegrown talent, throwing light on how they truly shaped the design story of India."

The same year, she was named 'Best Dressed' by Verve magazine.

From 2010 to 2017, Shakur owned a design gallery. In 2017, Thakur designed one of Marriott Hotels' promotional campaigns in Jaisalmer.
