= Maharishi (writer) =

Tamil writer (1932–2019)

- Born: 1 May 1932; Orathanad, Thanjavur, Madras Presidency, British India
- Died: 27 September 2019 (aged 87); Salem, Tamil Nadu, India

Maharishi is the pseudonym of T.K. Balasubramanian, a Tamil writer from Tamil Nadu, India. Many of his novels were made into films including the film Bhuvana Oru Kelvi Kuri (1977). Maharishi was born in Tanjore, but settled in Salem, Tamil Nadu. He worked as a clerk in the TNEB. His first novel Panimalai was made into a film titled Ennathan Mudivu in 1965. Some of his other novels which were made into films are Bhadrakali (1977), Sainthadamma Sainthadu (1977), Vattathukkul Chaduram (1978), Nadhiyai Thedi Vandha Kadal (1980).

Maharishi has written around 130 novels, 5 short-story collections and 60 essays.

== Books ==
- Adharam Madhuram
- Agni Valayam
- Andha Poonai
- Anna
- Athuvaraiyil Kanchana
- Bhadrakaali
- Bhuvana Oru Kelvikuri
- Eera Pudavai
- Eera Vizhigal
- Ethirkattru
- Ennathaan Mudivu?
- Garudanai Kaditha Paambu
- Ilaiyudhir Kaalam
- Ippadiye Oru Vazhkkai
- Iraval Karu
- Kaatril Mithantha Padagu
- Kaatrodu Odiyavan!
- Kadalora Pookal
- Kalaintha Suruthi
- Kalyaana Parisu
- Kanavodu Sila Naatkal
- Kanneer Pugai
- Kanneer Thuliyil Kadalosai
- Koodu Sellum Paravai
- Jothi Vanthu Piranthaal
- Jwalai
- Kaandhamunai
- Maanasa
- Maanilam Enna Vilai?
- Maganadhi
- Manam Kavarndhavan
- Manam Oru Brindhaavanam
- Manthira Pushpam
- Mara Seepu
- Mega Chithirangal
- Meganilal
- Mohanaasthiram
- Muthukal Pathu
- Nadhiyai Thedivantha Kadal
- Nallathor Veenai
- Neruppin Matroru Mugam
- Neruppu Kozhi
- Nilavukku Yengiyavargal
- Ninaivugal Unnoduthan...
- Nizhalai Thediyavargal
- Onrukkul Oraayiram
- Oosi Munai
- Oru Devathiyin Punnagai
- Oru Munpanikaalam
- Paadi Paranthaval
- Panimalai
- Panipor
- Panichuvar
- Panju Bommai
- Paradhesi Kolam Thaandivittathu
- Parvaiyile Sevaganai..!
- Pattu Kudai
- Poornima
- Poo Potta Thaavani
- Puthuiya Poo
- Puzhudhi Puyal
- Tharangini
- Thattaamaalai
- Therkaal
- Thulasi
- Thuyarangal Uranguvathillai
- Saainthaadamma Saainthaadu
- Sabthapathi
- Sakkara Vandi
- Sakkaram Ino Suzhalum
- Snehamai Oru Kaadhal
- Sooriya Paathai
- Spatikam
- Tharaiyil Piditha Meen
- Unmaiyai Sonnavan
- Uyirthudippu
- Vaazhndhu Kaattuvom Vaa!
- Vandichakkaram
- Veera Sundhandhiram!
- Vensangu
- Vilayada Vanthaval
- Vittil
- Vittil Anaitha Vilakku
- Vizhakolam
- Yaagam
