= Kalthoon =

- Theatrical release poster
- Directed by: Major Sundarrajan
- Story by: Vijay Krishnaraj
- Produced by: S. S. Karuppa Sami
- Starring: Sivaji Ganesan; K. R. Vijaya; Major Sundarrajan
- Cinematography: T. S. Vinayagam
- Edited by: R. Devarajan
- Music by: M. S. Viswanathan
- Production company: S.S.K. Films
- Release date: 1 May 1981
- Country: India
- Language: Tamil

Kalthoon (transl. Rock Pillar) is a 1981 Indian Tamil-language drama film directed by Major Sundarrajan. The film stars Sivaji Ganesan, K. R. Vijaya and Sundarrajan. It is an adaptation of the stage play of the same name. The film was released on 1 May 1981 and was a commercial success, running for over 100 days in theatres.

== Plot ==
Parameshwaran Goundar, a respected village chieftain and farmer, struggles to sell his land to fund the medical education of his youngest son, Pazhanisamy. Parameshwaran has two other sons: one adopted and one biological. Despite excelling academically, Pazhanisamy develops a reputation as a womanizer, causing great disappointment to his father.

Parameshwaran's own father was a notorious womaniser who murdered his own wife, Parameshwaran's mother when she tried to stop him. When his father's behavior threatened to tarnish the village's reputation, Parameshwaran, placing justice and honor above family, killed his father to restore the community's respect. He served a prison sentence for the act and later earned the position of chieftain for his unwavering commitment to justice.

When Pazhanisamy's behavior begins to mirror that of his grandfather, Parameshwaran publicly confronts him, even striking him at his college. This incident alienates Pazhanisamy from his family, setting the stage for a dramatic conflict. The story culminates in whether Parameshwaran will choose justice over familial ties once more or if Pazhanisamy will repent and change his ways.

== Cast ==
- Sivaji Ganesan as Parameshwara Gounder
- K. R. Vijaya
- Major Sundarrajan
- Nagesh
- Thengai Srinivasan
- V. S. Raghavan
- V. K. Ramasamy
- Thilak
- Jayamala

== Production ==
Kalthoon was based on the stage play of the same name. Sundarrajan who acted in the play, directed the film adaptation.

== Soundtrack ==
The music was composed by M. S. Viswanathan, while the lyrics were penned by Kannadasan.

Song	Singers	Duration
"Singara Chittu Thaan"	T. M. Soundararajan, P. Susheela	07:48
"Ezhu Thalaimuraiyil"	T. M. Soundararajan	05:32
"Valarththa Kada Mutta Vanda"	T. M. Soundararajan	04:20
"Eswaran Sannadhiyil"	T. M. Soundararajan	

== Release and reception ==
Kalthoon was released on 1 May 1981. Kutty Krishnan of Kalki criticised Sundarrajan's direction. After the film's success, Thilak adapted the film's title as a prefix.
