= Vetrikku Oruvan =

1979 film by SP. Muthuraman

- Theatrical release poster
- Directed by: S. P. Muthuraman
- Written by: Panchu Arunachalam
- Produced by: S. Baskar
- Starring: Sivaji Ganesan; Sripriya; M. N. Nambiar; Mohan Babu
- Cinematography: Babu
- Edited by: R. Vittal
- Music by: Ilaiyaraaja
- Production company: Vijayabhaskar Films
- Release date: 8 December 1979
- Country: India
- Language: Tamil

Vetrikku Oruvan is a 1979 Indian Tamil language film, directed by S. P. Muthuraman and produced by S. Baskar. The film stars Sivaji Ganesan, Sripriya, M. N. Nambiar and Mohan Babu. It was released on 8 December 1979.

== Plot ==
Saravanan is a shy, soft-spoken man who worships his father, Rajaraman, who pens love letters for his son. Saravanan develops feelings for Radha, a maid employed by Madhan, a criminal who works for Ethirajulu, the crime boss masquerading as an honest businessperson.

Rajaraman exposes him and raids his home and office in his capacity as tax officer. In anger, Ethirajulu gets Rajaraman murdered by Madhan. This comes as a wake up call to Saravanan who decides that he wants vengeance. He, with help from Radha, learns martial arts, prepares, does background research and then proceeds to systematically destroy Ethirajulu's empire and in the end, kills him and Madhan.

== Cast ==
- Sivaji Ganesan as Saravanan
- Sripriya as Radha
- M. N. Nambiar as Ethirajulu
- Mohan Babu as Madhan
- Major Sundarrajan as Rajaraman
- Thengai Srinivasan
- V. K. Ramasamy as Radha's father
- Y. G. Parthasarathy as Ethirajulu's secretary
- Poornam Viswanathan
- Pushpalatha as Saravanan's mother

== Production ==
Vetrikku Oruvan Is the debut film for wig maker B. Natesan. He designed the "curly" wig that Sripriya wears in the song "Thoranam Aadidum", which he found challenging to make. Pushpalatha, who played Ganesan's daughter in Paar Magaley Paar, played his mother in this film. The film was originally titled Kanne Kanmaniye.

== Soundtrack ==
The music was composed by Ilaiyaraaja, with lyrics by Panchu Arunachalam.

Song	Singers	Length
"Aadal Paadalil"	T. M. Soundararajan	04:25
"Muththamizh Charame"	T. M. Soundararajan, S. P. Sailaja	04:23
"Thoranam Aadidum"	T. M. Soundararajan, S. Janaki	04:40
"Yaar Maamano"	S. Janaki	04:41

== Reception ==
According to Muthuraman, the failed at the box-office as shoot happened without any proper planning.
