= Ulta Seedha =

- Directed by: Subodh Mukherji
- Written by: Subodh Mukherji
- Screenplay by: Ranjan Bose
- Story by: Subodh Mukherji
- Produced by: Subodh Mukherji
- Starring: Raj Babbar; Rati Agnihotri
- Cinematography: N. V. Srinivas
- Edited by: Ravi Patnaik
- Music by: Rajesh Roshan
- Production company: Subodh Mukerji Productions
- Release date: 26 April 1985
- Running time: 129 min
- Country: India
- Language: Hindi

Ulta Seedha (transl. Upside down right side up) is a 1985 Indian Bollywood comedy drama film directed and produced by Subodh Mukherji. It stars Raj Babbar, Rati Agnihotri in pivotal roles.

== Cast ==
- Raj Babbar as Ramesh Saxena
- Rati Agnihotri as Shobha Roy
- Deven Verma as Sapan Kumar
- Aruna Irani as Bahji
- Madan Puri as Colonel Khurana
- Utpal Dutt as Justice M. K. Roy
- Chand Usmani as Mrs. Roy
- Agha as Robert
- Shubha Khote as Mrs. Robert
- Dalip Tahil as Dhanraj Singh
- Dinesh Hingoo as Dr. Malik
- Sudha Chopra as Mrs. Khurana

== Soundtrack ==
Lyrics: Majrooh Sultanpuri

Song	Singer
"Ulta Seedha"	Kishore Kumar
"Dakan Ki Ek Haseena"	Kishore Kumar
"Yaar Ki Gali, Din Bahar Ka, Aa Gaya Maza Aaj Pyar Ka"	Kishore Kumar, Lata Mangeshkar
"Uncle Robert Kya Bole Tumko Dekhkar Kyun Aisa"	Kishore Kumar, Asha Bhosle, Bonny Remedious
"Zulfon Ke Andhere Mein"	Asha Bhosle
