= Magane Magane =

- Directed by: K. N. Lakshmanan
- Written by: Panchu Arunachalam
- Produced by: Panchu Arunachalam
- Starring: Suresh; Manju Bhargavi; Poornima Rao
- Cinematography: Rajasekar
- Edited by: Uma Shankar; Robert
- Music by: Ilaiyaraaja
- Production company: Panchu Arts
- Release date: 25 December 1982
- Country: India
- Language: Tamil

Magane Magane (transl. Oh Son! Oh Son!) is a 1982 Indian Tamil-language film directed by K. N. Lakshmanan and written by Panchu Arunachalam, starring Suresh, Manju Bhargavi and Poornima Rao. The film was released on 25 December 1982.

== Cast ==
- Suresh
- Manju Bhargavi
- Poornima Rao

== Soundtrack ==
The music was composed by Ilaiyaraaja.

Song title	Singer(s)	Lyricist
"Malligaipoovukul"	Malaysia Vasudevan, S. Janaki	Vairamuthu
"Magane Ilamagane"	P. Susheela	Vairamuthu
"Madhu Malargale"	Malaysia Vasudevan, S. Janaki	Panchu Arunachalam
"Per Solla"	P. Susheela	Panchu Arunachalam
