= Johny I Love You =

1982 Indian film Directed by Rakesh Kumar

- Directed by: Rakesh Kumar
- Written by: Sachin Bhowmick
- Starring: Sanjay Dutt; Rati Agnihotri; Amrish Puri
- Music by: Rajesh Roshan
- Release date: 19 November 1982
- Running time: 2 hours 51 min
- Country: India
- Language: Hindi

Johny I Love You is a 1982 Indian Hindi romance drama film directed by Rakesh Kumar. The movie stars Sanjay Dutt, Rati Agnihotri, Amrish Puri and Suresh Oberoi in lead roles.

== Plot ==
Suraj Singh leaves his past life and lives in a remote hill town after the death of his wife. His only son Johny is unaware about father's past but Suraj Singh's ex-partner, present enemy Zalim Khan comes there years later. Johny has to confront Zalim Khan to find the truth about his parents.

== Cast ==
- Sanjay Dutt as Raju Singh / Johny
- Rati Agnihotri as Seema
- Tanuja as Meera
- Suresh Oberoi as Suraj Singh
- Amrish Puri as Zalim Khan
- Om Prakash as Colonel
- Aruna Irani as Seductress

== Soundtrack ==
Lyrics: Anand Bakshi

#	Song	Singer
1	"Johny Dilber Jani"	Kishore Kumar, Lata Mangeshkar
2	"Aa Samne Maidan Mein"	Kishore Kumar, Lata Mangeshkar
3	"Aage Aage Dulha Chale"	Kishore Kumar, Asha Bhosle
4	"Kabhi Kabhi Bezuban"	Lata Mangeshkar
5	"Rang Rangila Hai Yeh"	Asha Bhosle
