= Kalthoon Thilak =

Indian actor (1943–2021)

- Born: Thilak Raj; April 5, 1943
- Died: May 7, 2021 (aged 78); Chennai, Tamil Nadu, India
- Occupation: Actor

Thilak Raj (April 5, 1943 – May 7, 2021) was an Indian actor. Also known as Kalthoon Thilak, he was known for playing supporting roles in Tamil films as an antagonist. His breakthrough performance came in the film, Kalthoon (1981), following which he adapted the film's title in his stagename.

== Career ==
Thilak began his career in the Tamil film industry as an assistant editor at AVM Studios and had worked on 24 films. He began experimenting as an actor through appearances in Major Sundarrajan's drama troupe.

Thilak went on to act in over 70 films, including Thayilla Kuzhandhai (1976), Per Solla Oru Pillai (1978) and Aarilirunthu Arubathu Varai (1979), often appearing as arrogant villainous characters. In the latter, he portrayed the son of T. K. Bhagavathi's character, who ill treats the character portrayed by Rajinikanth. He garnered acclaim for his role in Sundarrajan's Kalthoon (1981), featuring as the son of Sivaji Ganesan and K. R. Vijaya's characters. In the 2010s, he worked as an actor in Tamil television serials.

== Filmography ==
Films

- Vellikizhamai Viratham (1974)
- Tiger Thathachari (1974)
- Apoorva Raagangal (1975)
- Thayilla Kuzhandhai (1976)
- Oru Oodhappu Kan Simittugiradhu (1976)
- Per Solla Oru Pillai (1978)
- Aarilirunthu Arubathu Varai (1979)
- Kalthoon (1981)
- Per Sollum Pillai (1987)
- Kai Naattu (1988)
- Aavathellam Pennale (1990)
- Velai Kidaichuduchu (1990)
- Adhikari (1991)

Television

- Gopuram
- Athipookkal

== Death ==
Thilak died of COVID-19 during the COVID-19 pandemic in Tamil Nadu in Chennai on 7 May 2021.
