= Ennathan Mudivu =

1965 film by K. S. Gopalakrishnan

- Theatrical release poster
- Directed by: K. S. Gopalakrishnan
- Screenplay by: K. S. Gopalakrishnan
- Based on: Panimalai by Maharishi
- Produced by: Balu
- Starring: A. V. M. Rajan; T. S. Balaiah
- Cinematography: R. Sampath
- Edited by: R. Devarajan
- Music by: R. Sudharsanam
- Production company: Ravi Productions
- Distributed by: One Films Corporation
- Release date: 13 August 1965
- Country: India
- Language: Tamil

Ennathan Mudivu (transl. What was the result?) is a 1965 Indian Tamil-language thriller film written and directed by K. S. Gopalakrishnan. It is based on Panimalai, a novel written by Maharishi. The film stars A. V. M. Rajan and T. S. Balaiah. It was released on 13 August 1965 and received critical acclaim, but failed commercially.

== Plot ==
A just-released convict plans revenge against the man who framed him for two crimes.

== Cast ==
Actors

- A. V. M. Rajan
- T. S. Balaiah
- V. K. Ramasamy
- V. S. Raghavan
- Master Sridhar

Actresses

- Anjali Devi
- Vasanthi
- G. Sakunthala

== Production ==
Ennathan Mudivu was produced by Balu, and directed by K. S. Gopalakrishnan, who also wrote the screenplay. The film was based on Panimalai, a 1965 novel written by Maharishi. Cinematography was handled by R. Sampath, art direction by Rangamuthu and editing by R. Devarajan.

== Themes ==
According to Gopalakrishnan, he endeavoured to "stress the qualities of mercy and forgiveness" and this film was made to "eschew thoughts of revenge and to show kindness in return for evil".

== Soundtrack ==
The music of the film was composed by R. Sudarsanam, with lyrics by Kothamangalam Subbu and Mayavanathan.

Track listing
No.	Title	Lyrics	Singer(s)	Length
1.	"Paavi Ennai"	Mayavanathan	T. M. Soundararajan
2.	"Kalaithanil"	Kothamangalam Subbu	Sirkazhi Govindarajan, L. R. Eswari
3.	"Ponna Petha"	Mayavanathan	P. Susheela

== Release and reception ==
Ennathan Mudivu was released on 13 August 1965, and distributed by One Films Corporation. The film received critical acclaim for its treatment and the performances of its cast, but did not succeed commercially. On 21 August 1965, The Indian Express called the film "grim, gripping and, at times, brilliant." On 11 September 1965, T. M. Ramachandran of Sport and Pastime praised the film for various aspects, including Gopalakrishnan's writing and direction, and the cast performances. Kalki appreciated Gopalakrishnan for being able to make a film within three months without compromising on quality. However, S. Krishnaswamy of The Illustrated Weekly of India felt it "suffered from basic contradictions in plot, and from the absence of cinema in its vital visual form". The film earned Maharishi a best writer award.
