= Rakta Bandhan =

- Promotional poster
- Directed by: Rajat Rakshit
- Produced by: Tarachand Barjatya
- Starring: Mithun Chakraborty; Rati Agnihotri; Surinder Kaur; Jagdeep
- Music by: Usha Khanna
- Production company: Rajshri Productions
- Release date: 22 June 1984
- Running time: 135 minutes
- Country: India
- Language: Hindi

Rakta Bandhan is a 1984 Hindi-language drama film directed by Rajat Rakshit, starring Mithun Chakraborty, Rati Agnihotri, Surinder Kaur and Dina Pathak Jagdeep in a supporting role.

== Plot ==
A mother gives birth to twin children, naming one Chandan and the other Kundan. Durjan Singh who was a dacoit loots and burns their house. They also take Kundan separating the brothers. Chandan is mentally challenged and stays with his mother and his sister in a village. Kundan is brought up by dacoits and changed his identity to Trishul Singh. Kundan becomes a dacoit.

Chandan becomes a worker for Dharmadas and earns money. Meanwhile, Kundan joins a group of dacoits living in a forest and participates in robberies. Chandan is in a relationship with a woman named Roopa. In their village, a gangster named Kallu attempts to assault Chandan’s sister and harasses the family.One day, Trishul Singh’s father, Durjan Singh, falls ill and confesses that he had once looted a village and abducted Trishul as a child, revealing that he is not his biological father. He dies shortly afterward.Later, Trishul Singh commits a robbery at the house of a married couple and kills the husband of a dancer named Komabhayee. He brings her with him, and the two eventually develop a relationship.After Kallu severely beats Chandan, Trishul finds him unconscious and believes he is dead. He exchanges clothes with Chandan so that the police will assume he has died. Trishul then disguises himself as Chandan and goes to live with Chandan’s mother, unaware that she is his biological mother.

It is revealed that Chandan is alive. Trishul's gang finds Chandan in an unconscious condition and mistakes him for Trishul. Trishul had been the head of the gang. Chandan behaves very differently and they conclude that he has brain damage. Sardar wants to become the gang leader. He brings Dev, the priest of their village, to help him recover. Chandan identifies Dev and tries to convince him that he is Chandan, but Dev acts as if he doesn't know anything, Dev fears that if he tells the truth they will kill him. Dev returns to the village and tells Kallu that Trishul is pretending to be Chandan. Kallu kills Dev. The gang discovers that Chandan is not Trishul. Sardar tries to kill Chandan. Chandan realizes that he has a twin brother. One day their mother tells Trishul what happened when they were children. Trishul realizes that Chandan is his twin brother. Komabhayee tells Trishul that Sardar had planned to kill Chandan. Trishul goes to save his brother. Kallu follows and tries to kill him, but Trishul kills him. Komabhayee tells Chandan that his brother is still alive and Chandan figures out that Trishul is his twin. When Sardar tries to shoot Chandan, Komabhayee comes between them and gets shot in the stomach. She grabs a trident and stabs Sardar and kills him. Trishul arrives and the brothers hug each other. Trishul kills Komabhayee.

For their sister's wedding, Trishul sends Chandan to the marriage hall to make everything ready. The police appear. Trishul tries to escape, but the police shoot him. He comes to the marriage hall. Chandan sees that Trishul is in critical condition. Trishul convinces him to go back to the wedding. Trishul surrenders to the police and they tell him to come with them but he asks to see his sister's face one last time. After seeing his sister's face Trishul feels satisfaction and dies before the police can take him away.

== Cast ==
- Mithun Chakraborty as Chandan / Kundan a.k.a. Trishul Singh (dual role)
- Rati Agnihotri as Roopa, Chandan's girlfriend
- Sadhna Singh as Sona; Chandan and Kundan's sister
- Gopal Sehgal as a rakhi seller at the beginning of the movie
- Jagdeep as Bhola
- Leela Mishra
- Mukri as Dharmdas
- Dina Pathak as Chandan's mother
- Birbal as Kallu
- Dinesh Hingoo as Munimji of Dharmadas
- Shubha Khote as Bhola's mother
- Surinder Kaur as Komabhai
- Viju Khote as Police Inspector
- Jankidas

== Songs ==
#	Title	Singer(s)
1	"Shokh Hasina Dekho Aai".	Alka Yagnik
2	"Pyar Chahiye (Female)"	Alka Yagnik
3	"Sare Bazar Yu Muzko Laya Gaya"	Alka Yagnik
4	"Pyar Chahiye (Male)"	Suresh Wadkar
5	"Ghungharu Baje O Mere"	Hemlata
