= Ullasa Paravaigal =

- Theatrical release poster
- Directed by: C. V. Rajendran
- Written by: Panchu Arunachalam
- Produced by: S. P. Thamizharasi
- Starring: Kamal Haasan; Rati Agnihotri; Unni Mary
- Cinematography: Ashok Kumar
- Edited by: N. M. Victor
- Music by: Ilaiyaraaja
- Production company: S. P. T. Films
- Release date: 7 March 1980
- Running time: 126 minutes
- Country: India
- Language: Tamil

Ullasa Paravaigal (transl. Joyful birds) is a 1980 Indian Tamil-language romantic drama film directed by C. V. Rajendran, starring Kamal Haasan and Rati Agnihotri. It was released on 7 March 1980. This film was dubbed into Hindi as Do Dil Deewane. This film was also dubbed into Telugu-language as Prema Pichchi and was released on 21 February 1981.

== Plot ==
Ravi (Kamal Haasan) is in denial about his poor mental health. His love interest Shenbagam (Unni Mary), a charming village girl, recently died in a house fire, the result of an evil plot by her uncle, who lusted after his niece. As a result of the fire, Ravi develops pyrophobia but continues to deny his problems. His father and his friend Raju plan to take him abroad for treatment of his illness. Whilst there, Ravi meets his childhood friend Nirmala. With the help of Nirmala and Raju (Suruli Rajan), Ravi gets better. The second half of the film deals with how Ravi's uncle tries to kill him to get his hands on his fortune, and how Ravi overcomes him.

== Cast ==
- Kamal Haasan as Raveendran (Ravi)
- Rati Agnihotri as Nirmala
- Unni Mary as Shenbagam
- Major Sundarrajan as Madanagopal
- Suruli Rajan as Raju
- Vennira Aadai Moorthy as Film director
- K. Natraj as Rajagopal
- Anju as young Nirmala (Uncredited)

== Production ==
Ullasa Paravaigal was shot extensively in the Netherlands, Germany, France and the United States.

== Soundtrack ==
The music was composed by Ilaiyaraaja, and lyrics were written by Panchu Arunachalam. The songs "Germaniyin Senthen Malare" and "Dheiveega Raagam" became chartbusters. The latter song was recreated for Bommai (2023).

Track listing
No.	Title	Singer(s)	Length
1.	"Azhagiya Malargalin"	S. Janaki	3:37
2.	"Azhagu Aayiram"	S. Janaki	4:23
3.	"Dheiveega Raagam"	Jency, Vani Jairam	4:32
4.	"Engengum Kandenamma"	Malaysia Vasudevan, S. P. Balasubrahmanyam	4:22
5.	"Germaniyin Senthen Malare"	S. P. Balasubrahmanyam, S. Janaki	5:39
6.	"Naan Undan Thaayaaga"	S. Janaki	4:29
Total length:			27:02

All lyrics are written by Rajasri.

Telugu track listing
No.	Title	Lyrics	Singer(s)	Length
1.	"Andamannadi"	Rajasri	Jikki
2.	"Germany Ke Andam"	Rajasri	S. P. Balasubrahmanyam, S. Janaki
3.	"O Mouna Raagam"	Rajasri	Jikki
4.	"Prema Pichi – Theme 1"
5.	"Prema Pichi – Theme 2"
6.	"Ullasa Paravaigal – Theme 3"

All lyrics are written by Prem Dhawan.

Hindi track listing
No.	Title	Lyrics	Singer(s)	Length
1.	"Kitne Rangeen Hai"	Prem Dhawan	S. Janaki	03:47
2.	"Yeh Jahan Tum"	Prem Dhawan	S. Janaki	04:23
3.	"Hai Pyar Ka Sangam"	Prem Dhawan	S. Janaki & Chorus	04:28
4.	"Dilbar Aa"	Prem Dhawan	S. P. Balasubrahmanyam, S. Janaki	05:24
5.	"Aaj Khoye Se Ho Kyon Tum"	Prem Dhawan	S. Janaki	04:24

== Reception ==
Kanthan of Kalki wrote that the titular birds were flying high as a Boeing aircraft. Naagai Dharuman of Anna praised the acting of the cast, Ashok Kumar's cinematography, Ilayaraja's music and Rajendran's direction.
