= En Jeevan Paduthu =

1988 film by R. Sundarrajan

- Poster
- Directed by: R. Sundarrajan
- Screenplay by: R. Sundarrajan
- Story by: Panchu Arunachalam
- Produced by: Panchu Arunachalam; A. R. Shanmuganathan
- Starring: Karthik; Saranya; Sudha Swarnalakshmi
- Cinematography: Rajarajan
- Edited by: B Krishnakumar; Srinivas
- Music by: Ilaiyaraaja
- Production company: Panchu Associates
- Release date: 23 June 1988
- Running time: 132 minutes
- Country: India
- Language: Tamil

En Jeevan Paduthu (transl. My soul is singing) is a 1988 Indian Tamil-language romance film directed by R. Sundarrajan. The film stars Karthik and Saranya, supported by Sudha Swarnalakshmi, Captain Raju and Kapil Dev. It was released on 23 June 1988.

== Plot ==
Narmada joins a new college, as she feels so bored sitting alone in her house. Her father is a businessman. In college, she happens to see the paintings and books written by Surendran. She is very much fascinated by him, but unable to find him in college. She is shocked when she finds Surendran has already committed suicide. Narmada frequently visits his grave in the following days, and the ghost of Surendran appears, advising her to cease visiting his grave. Those around Narmada suspect that she is mentally ill, as nobody else can see Surendran.

Surendran tells Narmada he was duped into love by his colleague Philomina. He genuinely loved her, enough to convert to Christianity; Surendran's father dies of shock at the conversion. Philomina proves unfaithful, and marries Dr. Vijay, which results in Surendran committing suicide. Later it is revealed that Philomina dies during delivery.

Anand, a rich businessman, becomes attracted to Narmada and asks for her hand in marriage. Narmada's father approves of this marriage proposal, but Narmada is against this alliance as she is in love with Surendran. Narmada's father forcefully announces the marriage, but she escapes from the marriage hall and commits suicide to join Surendran in the afterlife.

== Cast ==
- Karthik as Surendran
- Pratap Pothen as Dr. Vijay
- Kapil Dev as Anand
- Saranya as Narmada
- Sudha Swarnalakshmi as Philomena
- Manorama as Seetha
- Kovai Sarala
- Captain Raju as Chakravarthy
- A. R. Srinivasan as Jagannatham
- Usilai Mani
- Santhana Bharathi as Surendran's father
- Chinni Jayanth
- Thyagu
- Ennathe Kannaiah
- Jaishankar (guest appearance)
- Subbu Panchu as Dr. Vijay's assistant (uncredited role)

== Production ==
The film began production in August 1986.

== Soundtrack ==
The music was composed by Ilaiyaraaja. The flute portions in the song "Ore Murai Un Dharisanam" were performed by Arunmozhi.

Track listing
No.	Title	Lyrics	Singer(s)	Length
1.	"Aan Pillai Enraal Meesai"	Panchu Arunachalam	S. Janaki, Mano, Chorus	4:43
2.	"Engirundho Azhaikkum" (female)	Ilaiyaraaja	Lata Mangeshkar	4:38
3.	"Engirundho Azhaikkum" (male)	Ilaiyaraaja	Ilaiyaraaja	4:40
4.	"Engirundho Azhaikkum" (duet)	Ilaiyaraaja	Mano, Lata Mangeshkar	3:00
5.	"Kaadhal Vaanile"	Panchu Arunachalam	S. Janaki	4:30
6.	"Katti Vechukko Enthan Anbu Manasu"	Panchu Arunachalam	Malaysia Vasudevan, S. Janaki	4:35
7.	"Mounam Yen Mounamey Vasantha Kaalama"	Panchu Arunachalam	Mano	4:29
8.	"Ore Murai Un Dharisanam"	Panchu Arunachalam	S. Janaki	4:21
Total length:				34:56

== Reception ==
N. Krishnaswamy of The Indian Express wrote, "Though director R. Sundarrajan is on very fragile ground and has to do some skating on thin ice playing the girl-ghost card as the audience sometimes tends to turn ghostbusters with catcalls, it is the humorous line — girl talking away to an invisible ghost to the incomprehension of her friends and these same friends in shivers when things seem suspended in thin air while the ghost is in fact holding them — that saves the day."
