= Manamagale Vaa =

- Theatrical release poster
- Directed by: Panchu Arunachalam
- Written by: Panchu Arunachalam
- Produced by: B. H. Rajannah
- Starring: Prabhu; Radhika
- Cinematography: Rajarajan
- Edited by: N. Chandran
- Music by: Ilaiyaraaja
- Production company: Rajaa Enterprises
- Release date: 25 November 1988
- Country: India
- Language: Tamil

Manamagale Vaa (transl. Come, my bride) is a 1988 Indian Tamil-language romantic comedy film written and directed by Panchu Arunachalam in his directorial debut. The film stars Prabhu and Radhika. It was released on 25 November 1988. The film was remade in Telugu as Idem Pellam Baboi (1990) and in Kannada as Halli Rambhe Belli Bombe (1991).

== Plot ==
Balu is an eligible bachelor, looking for a wife. With a picture perfect woman in mind, he insults and rejects many women. Meanwhile, Chitra is looking for a way to reconcile her sister Geetha's marriage with her husband. Geetha has been sent to her parents' home for s fault that's not hers. Chitra figures that the most appropriate way to settle scores with her sister's in-laws is by marrying Balu, as Geetha is married to Balu's brother. She disguises herself as a village belle, Rajathi and enters Balu's life. After marriage, Balu is traumatised by her ignorance, but Rajathi falls in love with him. Meanwhile, Rajathi's suitor from the village hatches a plan to bring her back from her husband and marry her forcibly. Balu, on the other hand, decides to divorce Rajathi. Chitra decides to unveil her mask now, but will her plan succeed or boomerang?

== Cast ==
- Prabhu as Balu
- Radhika as Chitra and Rajathi
- Goundamani as Gounder
- Chinni Jayanth
- P. R. Varalakshmi
- V. K. Ramasamy
- S. S. Chandran
- Gandhimathi
- Kovai Sarala as Ponni
- Vennira Aadai Moorthy
- Soorya as Geetha
- Oru Viral Krishna Rao
- Idichapuli Selvaraj
- Charle
- Omakuchi Narasimhan
- Typist Gopu
- Manorama
- Sudha

== Production ==
Manamagale Vaa is the directorial debut of Panchu Arunachalam, and was initially titled Kothandarama Reddi.

== Soundtrack ==
The music was composed by Ilaiyaraaja.

Track listing
| No. | Title | Lyrics | Singer(s) | Length |
|---|---|---|---|---|
| 1. | "Aavaram Poovai" | Panchu Arunachalam | P. Susheela | 4:27 |
| 2. | "Kannimanam" | Panchu Arunachalam | S. Janaki | 4:23 |
| 3. | "Ponmaanai Polaadum" | Panchu Arunachalam | Malaysia Vasudevan, K. S. Chithra | 4:32 |
| 4. | "Tell Me" | Vaali | Arunmozhi | 4:23 |
| 5. | "Thanniya Thorandhu" | Panchu Arunachalam | K. S. Chithra | 4:18 |
| Total length: | | | | 22:03 |

== Reception ==
The Indian Express appreciated the film for reversing the "Taming of the shrew" formula. P. S. S. of Kalki appreciated the film for its comedy.
