= Kaatrinile Varum Geetham =

1978 film by S. P. Muthuraman

- Poster
- Directed by: S. P. Muthuraman
- Written by: Panchu Arunachalam
- Produced by: S. Bhaskar
- Starring: R. Muthuraman; Kavitha
- Cinematography: Babu
- Edited by: R. Vittal; N. Damodharan
- Music by: Ilaiyaraaja
- Production company: Vijayabhaskar Films
- Release date: 26 January 1978
- Running time: 132 minutes
- Country: India
- Language: Tamil

Kaatrinile Varum Geetham (transl. The song wafts into the air) is a 1978 Indian Tamil-language film, directed by S. P. Muthuraman and written by Panchu Arunachalam. The film stars R. Muthuraman and Kavitha. It was released on 26 January 1978, and failed at the box-office.

== Plot ==
Mohan is suspected in the murder of a young woman. Geetha is the policewoman assigned to his case. Mohan, his mother and his friend Chandran are completely shocked to see Geetha and try to evade her. Police detain Mohan and question him and he reveals his past.

Mohan loved a village girl called Kamini and they elope to get married. But Kamini's father chases them and kills her. Distressed, Mohan goes on a trip where he meets Rosy, a look-alike of Kamini. They both fall in love and get married. But James, who also loved Rosy, kills her after the wedding.

Mohan says Geetha is a look-alike of Kamini/Rosy and that is the reason he is terrified of her. Geetha starts loving Mohan after hearing his story, but Mohan rejects her because he does not want another woman to die because of him. After a dramatic climax in an airplane, he is convinced they are made for each other and marries her.

== Cast ==
- R. Muthuraman as Mohan
- Kavitha as Geetha, Kamini and Rosy
- Thengai Srinivasan as Chandran
- Srikanth as James
- S. A. Ashokan as Veerayan
- M. N. Rajam as Mohan's mother
- Major Sundarrajan
- Sukumari
- Y. G. Mahendran as a flight passenger
- Usilai Mani as a flight passenger

== Production ==
The film's plot is based on the prevailing research opinion that seven people in the world are alike. The filming was held at four different states: Tamil Nadu, Kerala, Andhra Pradesh and Karnataka. While filming a song at Mercara, cinematographer Babu realised that the sun could not be seen and shoot could not be cancelled as most of the crew turned up on the sets. Since most of the place was foggy, he decided to shoot the song by showing the actress disappearing in white fog.

== Soundtrack ==
The music was composed by Ilaiyaraaja and lyrics were written by Panchu Arunachalam. The film marked the first collaboration between S. P. Muthuraman and Ilaiyaraaja. Voice overlapping technology was used in this film. The song "Oru Vanavil Pole" is set to Yamunakalyani, a Carnatic raga, while "Chithirai Sevvanam" is set to Tilang, a Hindustani raga.

Song	Singers
"Chithirai Sevvanam"	P. Jayachandran
"Kanden Engum"	S. Janaki
"Kanden Engum" (Pathos)	Vani Jairam
"Kannil Minnum"	Vani Jairam
"Oru Vanavil Pole"	P. Jayachandran, S. Janaki

== Reception ==
Ananda Vikatan rated the film 45 out of 100. Free India appreciated the cinematography, direction and triple-role performance of Kavitha. According to S. P. Muthuraman, the film failed at the box-office as audiences could not grasp the concept. Babu said the film failed due to its "complicated story". Nonetheless, he won the Tamil Nadu State Film Award for Best Cinematographer – Colour.

== Bibliography ==
- Sundararaman (2007) [2005]. Raga Chintamani: A Guide to Carnatic Ragas Through Tamil Film Music (2nd ed.). Pichhamal Chintamani. OCLC 295034757.
