= Kuva Kuva Vaathugal =

- Title card
- Directed by: Manivannan
- Screenplay by: Manivannan
- Story by: Panchu Arunachalam
- Produced by: Panchu Arunachalam
- Starring: Sivakumar; Sulakshana; Pandiyan; Ilavarasi
- Cinematography: A. Sabapathy
- Edited by: B. Kandhasamy
- Music by: Ilaiyaraaja
- Production company: Panchu Movies
- Release date: 14 January 1984
- Country: India
- Language: Tamil

Kuva Kuva Vaathugal (transl. The Ducks) is a 1984 Indian Tamil-language film directed by Manivannan and produced by Panchu Arunachalam. The film stars Sivakumar, Sulakshana, Pandiyan and Ilavarasi. It was released on 14 January 1984.

== Cast ==
- Sivakumar as Azhagu
- Sulakshana as Lakhsmi
- Pandiyan as Pandiyan
- Ilavarasi as Revathi
- Janagaraj
- Manorama as Parameswari
- Thengai Srinivasan as Dharmalingam
- Senthil
- Mohan (special appearance)
- Sasikala (special appearance)
- Vasu (special appearance)

== Soundtrack ==
The soundtrack was composed by Ilaiyaraaja and lyrics were written by Panchu Arunachalam.

Song	Singers
"Nenachen Nenachen"	Vani Jairam
"Paayum Puli"	S. Janaki
"Pollatha Aasai"	S. P. Balasubrahmanyam, Vani Jairam
"Thenil Vaditha Silaiye"	Krishnachandran, S. Janaki

== Reception ==
Jayamanmadhan of Kalki praised the acting of the star cast, Manivannan's direction, Arunachalam's dialogues, Ilaiyaraaja's music and Sabapathy's cinematography.
