= Mayangukiral Oru Maadhu =

1975 film by S. P. Muthuraman

- Directed by: S. P. Muthuraman
- Written by: Panchu Arunachalam
- Produced by: S. Baskar
- Starring: Muthuraman; Sujatha
- Cinematography: Babu
- Edited by: R. Vittal
- Music by: Vijaya Bhaskar
- Production company: Vijayabaskar Films
- Distributed by: Vijayabaskar Films
- Release date: 30 May 1975
- Running time: 127 minutes
- Country: India
- Language: Tamil

Mayangukiral Oru Maadhu (pronounced [majaŋɡukiraːɭ oɾu maːðuː] transl. A woman falls in love) is a 1975 Indian Tamil-language film directed by S. P. Muthuraman and produced by S. Baskar. The film stars Muthuraman and Sujatha, with Thengai Srinivasan, Vijayakumar and Fatafat Jayalaxmi in supporting roles. It revolves around a woman who must try to keep a one-night stand that she had in college a secret from her husband, and thwart a persistent blackmailer's intent on collecting money from her to keep quiet about it.

Mayangukiral Oru Maadhu was released on 30 May 1975. The film was remade in Kannada as Baalu Jenu (1976), in Telugu as Yavvanam Katesindi (1976), and in Hindi as Bezubaan (1982).

== Plot ==
Kalpana, a college girl, has a one-night stand with Balu and becomes pregnant, but is saved by her hostel roommate Revathi and a lady doctor. She later marries Kumar, the doctor's brother. Kalpana later discovers that Vasan, a photographer, is aware of her one-night stand with Balu, and strives to keep this a secret from Kumar, even as Vasan begins blackmailing her for money to keep quiet about it.

== Cast ==
- Muthuraman as Kumar
- Sujatha as Kalpana
- Thengai Srinivasan as Vasan
- Ashokan (guest appearance)
- Vijayakumar as Balu
- Senthamarai
- M. N. Rajam (guest appearance)
- Jayalaxmi as Revathi
- Gandhimathi
- Pushpa
- Master Kumar
- Baby Rani

== Production ==
Mayangukiral Oru Maadhu was produced by S. Baskar under Vijayabaskar Films. The screenplay was written by Panchu Arunachalam. Jaishankar insisted the crew to shoot in Modern Theatres' studio as they were willing to provide rent for certain amount for entire film, this led the crew to begin the film there as most of the facilities were available in studios.

== Themes ==
C. R. W. David, in the book Cinema as Medium of Communication in Tamil Nadu, compared Mayangukiral Oru Maadhu to Avalum Penn Thaane (1974) because in both films, the lead female has "fallen" in her past.

== Soundtrack ==
The music was composed by Vijaya Bhaskar. The song "Samsaram Enbathu Veenai" reflects the expectations of a husband about his wife, with the lyrics "Samsaram enbathu veenai, santhosam enbathu ragam, salanangal athil illai" (wife is a veena, happiness is the raga, there are no discordant notes in it). The song "Varavendum Vaazhkkaiyil Vasantham" was reused from Vijaya Bhaskar's own song "Karpoorada Gombe Naanu" from the 1972 Kannada film Naagarahaavu.

Song	Singers	Lyrics	Length
"Samsaaram Enbathu Veenai"	S. P. Balasubrahmanyam	Kannadasan	03:15
"Oru puram Vedan"	Vani Jairam	Kannadasan	03:09
"Sugam Aayiram"	Vani Jairam	Panchu Arunachalam	04:13
"Varavendum Vaazhkkaiyil Vasantham"	K. J. Yesudas	Kannadasan	04:07

== Release and reception ==
Mayangukiral Oru Maadhu was released on 30 May 1975. Distributors refused to buy the film as they wanted the heroine character to die which Muthuraman refused to change it as he wanted to end the film in a revolutionary manner. This led the producer to distribute the film by himself; however this end was well received by audience. The film was certified "U" (unrestricted) by the censor board despite having a sex scene. When Muthuraman who initially thought the certificate was given for removing this scene surprisingly asked the censor official for providing "U" when he expected "A" (adults only), the official said that this particular scene was a turning point in the film and it only showed the consequences of it so they decided not to remove it. Kanthan of Kalki said Babu's cinematography uplifted the film while appreciating Muthuraman's direction and called Sujatha's performance as lifeline of the film.

== Remakes ==
Mayangukiral Oru Maadhu was remade in Kannada as Baalu Jenu (1976), in Telugu as Yavvanam Katesindi (1976), and in Hindi as Bezubaan (1982).
