= Thambi Pondatti =

- Film poster
- Directed by: Panchu Arunachalam
- Written by: Panchu Arunachalam
- Produced by: Ar. Shanmuganathan; P. Ar. Subramanian
- Starring: Rahman; Ramya Krishnan; Sukanya; Nizhalgal Ravi
- Cinematography: G. Or. Nathan
- Edited by: N. Chandran
- Music by: Ilaiyaraaja
- Production company: Geetha Chitra Combines
- Distributed by: Sivasakthi Cine Combines
- Release date: 7 February 1992
- Running time: 125 minutes
- Country: India
- Language: Tamil

Thambi Pondatti (transl. Younger brother's wife) is a 1992 Indian Tamil-language film, written and directed by Panchu Arunachalam. The film stars Rahman, Sukanya, Nizhalgal Ravi and Ramya Krishnan. It was released on 7 February 1992, and did not perform well at the box office.

== Plot ==
Somu is an advertising photographer who exclusively works with female models. His family is a very modern family. His elder brother Balu falls in love with his friend Maala, a modern woman, and he discloses it to Somu. They finally get married. Thereafter, the entire family searches for a bride for Somu. In turn, Somu gets married with Sumathi, who is from a strict conservative family. Sumathi becomes a suspicious wife and she finds her husband's family's behaviours irritating. What transpires later forms the crux of the story.

== Cast ==
- Rahman as Somu
- Sukanya as Sumathi
- Nizhalgal Ravi as Balu
- Ramya Krishnan as Maala
- Nagesh as Venugopal
- Rajesh as Chellappa
- Vivek as Mani
- Sulakshana as Parvathi
- Kavitha as Lakshmi
- R. N. K. Prasad
- Crazy Mohan
- Jayamkondan
- Vijaya Chandrika
- M. Bhanumathi
- Baby Sowmya
- Baby Thenu
- Rajendran as henchman (uncredited)

== Soundtrack ==
The soundtrack was composed by Ilaiyaraaja.

Song	Singer(s)	Lyrics	Duration
"En Mane"	Mano, K. S. Chithra	Gangai Amaran	4:40
"Eyru Mayil Eyri"	Swarnalatha, Minmini, Kalpana, Prasanna	Arunagirinathar	5:38
"Kannan Vanthathaaley"	Uma Ramanan	Panchu Arunachalam	4:49
"Sonnaalu Vetkam"	Arunmozhi	Panchu Arunachalam	4:35
"Un Ennam Enge"	Sunanda	Ilaiyaraaja	4:54
