= Bhadrakali (film) =

1976 film by A. C. Tirulokchandar

- Poster
- Directed by: A. C. Tirulokchandar
- Screenplay by: A. C. Tirulokchandar; Aaroor Dass (dialogues)
- Based on: Bhadrakali by Maharishi
- Produced by: A. C. Tirulokchandar
- Starring: Sivakumar; Rani Chandra
- Cinematography: Viswanath Rai
- Edited by: B. Kandaswamy
- Music by: Ilaiyaraaja
- Production company: Cine Bharath
- Release date: 10 December 1976
- Running time: 139 minutes
- Country: India
- Language: Tamil

Bhadrakali (transl. Protector Kali) is a 1976 Indian Tamil-language psychological drama film starring Sivakumar and Rani Chandra. Produced and directed by A. C. Tirulokchandar, it is an adaptation of the 1976 novel of the same name written by Maharishi. The soundtrack and film score were composed by Ilaiyaraaja. The film was remade in Telugu with the same name in 1977, in Malayalam as Pichipoo in 1978 and in Hindi as Baawri in 1982, by the same director.

== Plot ==
Gayathri, a docile Brahmin girl, is married to Ganesh, a conservative Brahmin. Gayathri suffers from a fear psychosis and gets frightened of even small things. They are a happy couple with an infant daughter Alamelu. Once Gayathri attends an interview and returns home dazed. From then on, her behaviour becomes abnormal and unpredictable, which affects her family life. Slowly, she loses her mental balance and people around her, including her child, husband and mother-in-law, are afraid to come anywhere near her. Nobody is able to comprehend the basis for her erratic behaviour and all efforts to get her treated fail. She accidentally kills her child, after which Ganesh's mother advises him to divorce her and remarry, and he relents. Gayathri is taken back to her parents’ home by her father. Ganesan marries Jayanthi, the daughter of advocate Ananthu, on the persuasion of his mother.

Jayanthi learns about Ganesh's first marriage and subsequent divorce only after the wedding. Though Jayanthi is initially upset, she gets reconciled. The mentally imbalanced Gayathri keeps visiting Ganesh's house even after their divorce. One day, she barges into their bedroom and attacks Jayanthi when she is intimate with Ganesh. An upset Ganesh advises Gayathri's father to move her out of town and he complies. Jayanthi gives birth to Ganesh's daughter Rukmini. Gayathri's life takes a new turn in the new town. An unknown person attempts to kill her when she is alone; she fights him and gets injured in the process. As a result, she regains her memory and sanity, and recollects what happened to her.

Gayathri reveals to her parents that what she went through and why she behaved in an unpredictable manner. On the day she was returning from the interview, she witnessed a person murdering a girl in an isolated bungalow. Since Gayathri was the only witness, the murderer chased her and attempted to kill her. In the process, she lost her mental balance out of fear. Her parents become happy with her return to normalcy. She understands the changed scenario of her life, including the death of her child and divorce, and reconciles to live alone. She takes up a job and refuses to collect further alimony from Ganesh.

Rukmini is kidnapped by Kandappan, who previously worked as Jayanthi's driver and had fallen in love with her. Ananthu had implicated Kandappan in a false case and got him arrested to keep him away from Jayanthi. Exploiting Kandappan's absence, he got Jayanthi married to Ganesh. To take revenge, Kandappan has kidnapped Rukmini and demands that Jayanthi have sex with him for getting her child back. Jayanthi reaches his place and prays for her escape with the child. At the same time, Gayathri, who learns about the kidnapping from her mother-in-law, reaches the spot. She recognises Kandappan as the murderer. After becoming possessed by goddess Bhadrakali, she fights Kandappan who ultimately dies after being impaled. Gayathri, who was also injured, succumbs in Ganesh's arms after having saved his daughter.

== Cast ==
- Sivakumar as Ganesh
- Rani Chandra as Gayathri
- Major Sundarrajan as Gayathri's father
- Rajasekaran as Kandappan
- Thengai Srinivasan as Ananthu
- Manorama as Parameshwari
- Bhavani as Jayanthi
- Sukumari as Ganesh's mother
- S. R. Sivakami as Gayathri's mother

== Production ==
Tirulokchandar decided to produce and direct a film based on Bhadrakali, a 1976 novel by Maharishi. Tirulokchandar produced the film under his home production company Cine Bharath and wrote the screenplay, while Aaroor Dass wrote the dialogues. Tirulokchandar chose Sivakumar as the male lead and while looking for a new face to cast as the female lead, they chose Rani Chandra, a Malayali actress, and planned to introduce her to the Tamil audience under the name "Gayathri". Prior to acting in this film, Rani Chandra had acted in about 60 films in Malayalam apart from Porchilai (1969) and Then Sindhudhe Vaanam (1975) in Tamil. Bhadrakali was considered her first major role in Tamil as she played minor roles in her earlier films in the language.

During the final stages of filming, Rani Chandra along with her mother and sisters went to Dubai to take part in a cultural programme. When they were on a return from Bombay to Madras on 11 October 1976, their plane caught fire and crashed near the airport, killing all the passengers. By then, 60% of filming was complete. As a result of Rani Chandra's death, a few unfinished portions of her were shot using a look-alike, named Pushpa, a group dancer. Apart from a few scenes involving the female lead, the climax portions were fully shot using Pushpa. Tirulokchandar was not fully convinced with the idea to shoot with a look-alike as Pushpa slightly resembled Rani. However, Viswanath Rai, the cinematographer encouraged him to go with the idea of look-alike and used different camera angles and long shots for scenes involving Pushpa. The character's voice was dubbed by Soundaram.

== Soundtrack ==
The music was composed by Ilaiyaraaja and the lyrics were written by Vaali. The song "Kannan Oru Kaikuzhandhai" is set in Mohanam raga. The song "Kettele" was banned at All India Radio due to its alleged vulgar lyrics. It was remixed by Dhina for Guru Sishyan (2010).

Song	Singers	Length
"Anandha Bhairavi"	M R Vijaya	03:50
"Kannan Oru"	K. J. Yesudas, P. Susheela	04:40
"Kettele"	P. Susheela	04:40
"Odugindral"	Sirkazhi Govindarajan	03:21
"Oththa Rooba"	Malaysia Vasudevan, S. Janaki	03:12

== Release and reception ==
Bhadrakali was released on 10 December 1976, received unanimous acclaim and became a box office success. Rani Chandra's portrayal as a Brahmin housewife was well received. Ananda Vikatan said, "It is a daring effort to bring out the script of a Tamil writer in a high quality film format. Dialogues by [Aaroor] Das have depth and the film deserves our appreciation!" Kanthan of Kalki praised the performances of cast and also praised the makers for adapting the source material well on the screen, called Aaroor Das's dialogues as short and sweet and concluded by calling it as a different kind of film.

== Bibliography ==
- Dhananjayan, G. (2011). The Best of Tamil Cinema, 1931 to 2010: 1931–1976. Galatta Media. OCLC 733724281.
- Rajadhyaksha, Ashish; Willemen, Paul (1998) [1994]. Encyclopaedia of Indian Cinema. British Film Institute and Oxford University Press. ISBN 0-19-563579-5.
