= Niram Maratha Pookal =

1979 film by Bharathiraja

- Theatrical release poster
- Directed by: Bharathirajaa
- Screenplay by: Bharathirajaa
- Story by: K. Bhagyaraj
- Starring: Sudhakar; Radikaa; Vijayan; Rati
- Cinematography: P. S. Nivas
- Edited by: R. Bhaskaran
- Music by: Ilaiyaraaja
- Production company: Lena Productions
- Release date: 31 August 1979
- Country: India
- Language: Tamil

Niram Maratha Pookal (pronounced [n̪iram maːraːða puːkkaɭ]; transl. Flowers that do not change colours) is a 1979 Indian Tamil-language romantic drama film directed and co-written by Bharathirajaa. The film stars Sudhakar, Radikaa, Vijayan and Rati. It was released on 31 August 1979.

== Plot ==
Sudhakar is a poor man desperately looking for work. One day he has a skirmish with Radhika, a rich woman and only daughter of a businessman Selladurai, in a telephone booth. Radhika finds out that Sudhakar is searching for a job from his diary that he leaves at the booth. She employs him in her father's firm as a manager and soon they mutually fall in love. Radhika's class-conscious father initially opposes but later reluctantly agrees to have them married. However things take a turn when his business friend Sivaraman, to whom he owes a lot of favours, visits him and reminds him of his old promise to get Radhika married to Sivaraman's son Vijayan. And soon after Sudhakar goes missing with five lakhs of the office cash on his way to Bombay and is presumed to have absconded. Radhika is heart-broken and her father takes her to Sivaraman's estate in Ooty to relax for a while.

In Ooty, Radhika and her father are introduced to Vijayan who shockingly seems to be a severely despondent alcoholic. He is often seen standing near the shore of the river listening to his tape recorder playing a lone melodious song, sung by a woman. After a few days in the estate and several interactions, Vijayan and Radhika get acquainted and friendly with each other and he opens up about his erstwhile lover Rathi. Vijayan had fallen in love with the beautiful Rathi at first sight and pursues her relentlessly till she finally reciprocates. Rathi often playfully cheats Vijayan about not knowing stuff like horse riding and car driving when she actually could. And on an April Fool's Day when she claims she doesn't know how to swim, Vijayan thinks she's fooling him again and playfully pushes her into the river but to his horror she drowns and dies. The incident left Vijayan as a suicidal wreck who carries poison in his coat but doesn't consume it just for his father's sake. Rather he has chosen the slow poison of alcohol. When Vijayan learns Radhika too has a past forlorn love affair, he feels closer to her since they both seem to be in the same boat.

As days move on, Vijayan and Radhika get closer to each other and eventually agree to get married, much to the delight of their fathers but then on an eventful day Radhika encounters Sudhakar working as a gardener in the estate. Radhika angrily admonishes him for having deserted her and walks away but Vijayan is determined to find out the truth. It turns out that Sudhakar was coerced and forced to decamp by Radhika's father himself so he could get her married to Vijayan. On the day of their supposed marriage, Vijayan gets Radhika united with Sudhakar and they leave town together. Later, Vijayan who had promised to Radhika to give up alcohol, instead consumes the poison he carried in his pocket and walks into the river that had once consumed his beloved Rathi. Before dying Vijayan makes a statement to God, "They say love is blind, but You have been blind to my love, so I am leaving my glasses for You".

== Cast ==
- Sudhakar as Sudhakar
- Radikaa as Radikaa
- Vijayan as Vijayan
- Rati as Rathi
- Vagai Chandrasekhar as the office peon
- Janagaraj as the office manager

== Production ==
After Panchu Arunachalam wrote the screenplay for the film that would become Niram Maratha Pookal, Bharathiraja approached K. Bhagyaraj for advice; Bhagyaraj rewrote the screenplay. When Arunachalam learned of this, after reading Bhagyaraj's rewritten version, he recommended that it be made into a film. Bharathiraja initially wanted Rajinikanth, Kamal Haasan and Sridevi to portray the characters Vijayan, Sudhakar and Rati; the producer who initially was supposed to produce died, so Sudhakar, Radikaa, Vijayan and Rati Agnihotri were instead cast as the lead characters, with their characters being named after themselves. Ravi, who later debuted with Bharathiraja's Nizhalgal (1980) was asked to audition as a dubbing artist for Vijayan. However, since Bharathiraaja himself decided to dub for the character, Ravi was dropped. Some romantic scenes picturised on Agnihotri and Vijayan were shot at Kodaikanal. Assistant director Manobala made a cameo appearance in the film.

== Soundtrack ==
The music was composed by Ilaiyaraaja. The song "Iru Paravaigal" is set to the Carnatic raga Mohanam, and "Muthal Muthalaga" is set to Mohanakalyani.

Song	Singers	Lyrics	Length
"Aayiram Malargalae"	Malaysia Vasudevan, S. P. Sailaja, Jency	Kannadasan	5:13
"Iru Paravaigal"	Jency	Gangai Amaran	4:24
"Muthal Muthalaga"	S. P. Balasubrahmanyam, S. Janaki	Panchu Arunachalam	4:15
"Niram Mara Pookale" (title song)	Jency	Panchu Arunachalam	2:48
"Iru Paravaigal" (Sad)	S.P. Sailaja	Gangai Amaran	2:00

== Release and reception ==
Niram Maratha Pookal was released on 31 August 1979. Kaushikan of Kalki negatively reviewed the film, calling it worth watching only for Sudhakar and Radikaa. Naagai Dharuman of Anna praised the acting, music, and direction.

== Bibliography ==
- Sundararaman (2007) [2005]. Raga Chintamani: A Guide to Carnatic Ragas Through Tamil Film Music (2nd ed.). Pichhamal Chintamani. OCLC 295034757.
