= Ullam Kavarntha Kalvan =

- DVD cover
- Directed by: Ashok Kumar
- Screenplay by: Panchu Arunachalam
- Story by: Subodh Ghosh
- Produced by: தூயவன்
- Starring: Pandiarajan; Nizhalgal Ravi; Rekha
- Cinematography: Ashok Kumar
- Edited by: T. K. Rasun
- Music by: Ilaiyaraaja
- Production company: Appu Movies
- Release date: 4 September 1987
- Country: India
- Language: Tamil

Ullam Kavarntha Kalvan (transl. Heart stealer) is a 1987 Indian Tamil-language romantic comedy film written by Panchu Arunachalam, directed and photographed by Ashok Kumar. A remake of the Hindi film Chitchor (1976), it stars Pandiarajan, Nizhalgal Ravi and Rekha, with V. K. Ramasamy and Manorama in supporting roles. The film was released on 4 September 1987.

== Cast ==
- Pandiarajan
- Nizhalgal Ravi
- Rekha
- V. K. Ramasamy
- Manorama
- Captain Raju
- Master Tinku
- Karuppu Subbiah
- Sachu
- Kovai Sarala
- Kutty Padmini

== Production ==
Ullam Kavarntha Kalvan, a remake of the Hindi film Chitchor, is the final film produced by Thooyavan. He died on 11 July 1987, when the film was close to completion.

== Soundtrack ==
The music was composed by Ilaiyaraaja. Rajesh Rajamani of HuffPost feels "Naadirukum" is a fusion song. It is set in the Carnatic raga Sankarabharanam.

Track listing
No.	Title	Lyrics	Singer(s)	Length
1.	"Naadirukum"	Panchu Arunachalam	P. Jayachandran	4:30
2.	"En Manasa"	Panchu Arunachalam	P. Jayachandran	4:27
3.	"Idhukuthana"	Panchu Arunachalam	Malaysia Vasudevan	4:35
4.	"Kalangkaathale"	Ilaiyaraaja	K. J. Yesudas, K. S. Chithra	4:38
5.	"Thene Senthane"	Panchu Arunachalam	S. P. Balasubrahmanyam	4:18
6.	"Poothendral"		K. S. Chithra	4:29
Total length:				26:57

== Release and reception ==
Ullam Kavarntha Kalvan was released on 4 September 1987. The Indian Express criticised the "wafer-thin" plot, but lauded Ashok Kumar's cinematography. Jayamanmadhan of Kalki also reviewed the film.
