= Nadhiyai Thedi Vandha Kadal =

- Directed by: B. Lenin
- Based on: Nadhiyai Thedi Vandha Kadal by Maharishi
- Starring: Jayalalithaa; Sarath Babu
- Music by: Ilaiyaraaja
- Release date: 15 January 1980
- Country: India
- Language: Tamil

Nadhiyai Thedi Vandha Kadal (transl. The sea which came in search of a river) is a 1980 Indian Tamil-language film. The directorial debut of B. Lenin, the film stars Jayalalithaa and Sarath Babu, and is based on a Maharishi novel of the same name. It was the last Tamil film to be released with Jayalalithaa in the lead role. The film was released on 15 January 1980.

== Cast ==
- Jayalalithaa
- Sarath Babu
- Fatafat Jayalaxmi
- Srikanth
- Master Sekhar
- Jamila

== Soundtrack ==
The music was composed by Ilaiyaraaja, with the lyrics written by Panchu Arunachalam. The song "Poonthottam Poovil" attained popularity, and was frequently broadcast on radio stations in Madras.

Song	Singers
Thavikkudhu Thayanguthu	P. Jayachandran, S. P. Sailaja
Poonthottam Poovil	S. P. Sailaja
Engeyo Etho	P. Susheela, S. P. Balasubrahmanyam
Varatha Kalangal	P. Susheela, S. P. Sailaja

== Release and reception ==
Nadhiyai Thedi Vandha Kadal was released on 15 January 1980. Kausikan of Kalki thanked director Lenin for carrying the story smoothly and concluded fans flock to the theatre like sea. Maharishi, however, was dissatisfied with the ending and few changes of the film made from the novel.
