= Pudhuppaattu =

- Poster
- Directed by: Panchu Arunachalam
- Written by: Panchu Arunachalam
- Produced by: Ilaiyaraaja
- Starring: Ramarajan; Vaidegi; Suma; Rajeev
- Cinematography: Rajarajan
- Edited by: B. Lenin; V. T. Vijayan
- Music by: Ilaiyaraaja
- Production company: Ilaiyaraaja Creations
- Release date: 17 October 1990
- Country: India
- Language: Tamil

Pudhupaattu (transl. New song) is a 1990 Indian Tamil-language film written and directed by Panchu Arunachalam, and produced by Ilaiyaraaja who also composed the music. The film stars Ramarajan, Vaidegi, Suma (in her Tamil debut) and Rajeev. It was released on 17 October 1990.

== Cast ==
- Ramarajan as Ramu
- Vaidegi as Kaveri
- Suma as Rajalakshmi aka Raji
- Rajeev as Rajendran
- Goundamani as Palanisamy
- Senthil as Muthu
- Senthamarai as Periyasaami Ambalan
- Livingston as Vadivelan
- Karuppu Subbiah
- Vellai Subbaiah
- C. I. D. Sakunthala as Ponnamma
- Thideer Kannaiah
- Periya Karuppu Thevar
- Nizhalgal Ravi in Special Appearance
- Ramya Krishnan as Steffina aka Steffi in Special Appearance
- Vaishnavi as Kalyani in a special appearance
- Vishnukanth as young Rajeev

== Soundtrack ==
The music was composed by Ilaiyaraaja. The song "Enga Ooru Kadhala" is set to Sankarabharanam, a Carnatic raga. The song "Ich Liebe Dich" is entirely in German. "Nethu Oruthara Oruthara" is a fusion song, blending electronic funk with Carnatic music instruments. The song also features in the films Thilagar (2015), Maareesan (2025), and a crossover episode of the television serials Moondru Mudichu and Singapennae in 2026.

Song	Singers	Lyrics	Length
"Enga Ooru Kadhala"	Asha Bhosle, Ilaiyaraaja	Gangai Amaran	04:38
"Intha Bhoomiye Enga"	Mano, S. Janaki	Panchu Arunachalam	04:50
"Nethu Oruthara Oruthara"	Ilaiyaraaja, K. S. Chithra	Gangai Amaran	04:24
"Sontham Vandhadhu"	K. S. Chithra	Vaali	04:29
"Thavamaa Thavamirunthu"	K. S. Chithra	Vaali	00:46
"Vethala Paakku"	K. S. Chithra	Vaali	00:35
"Ich Liebe Dich"	S. Janaki	Gangai Amaran	03:13
"Kutthalathil Thanni"	Gangai Amaran, S. P. Sailaja	Vaali	04:32
"Kumbidum Kai"	K. S. Chithra	Vaali	00:51
"Senjanthu"	K. S. Chithra	Vaali	00:57
