= Vattathukkul Chaduram =

- Theatrical release poster
- Directed by: S. P. Muthuraman
- Screenplay by: Panchu Arunachalam
- Based on: Vattathukkul Chaduram by Maharishi
- Produced by: N. S. Mani
- Starring: Latha; Sumithra; Srikanth; Sarath Babu
- Cinematography: Babu
- Edited by: R. Vittal; N. Dhamodharan
- Music by: Ilaiyaraaja
- Production company: M. A. M. Films
- Release date: 28 July 1978
- Running time: 136 minutes
- Country: India
- Language: Tamil

Vattathukkul Chaduram (transl. A square within a circle) is a 1978 Indian Tamil-language female buddy film, directed by S. P. Muthuraman and written by Panchu Arunachalam. Based on the novel of the same name by Maharishi, the film stars Latha, Sumithra, Srikanth and Sarath Babu. It depicts the depth of friendship shared between the characters Anu and Malathy. The film was released on 28 July 1978, and Latha won the Filmfare Award for Best Actress – Tamil.

== Plot ==
Anu falls in love with Karthik, the brother of her best friend Malathy from childhood. Karthik doesn't like her, since she was born out of wedlock. Malathy has always done well in school and wishes to continue studying further. Kartik and Malathy's mother tries to get her married. Anu suggests that she could take her along to Chennai, where she could continue studying while Anu pursues a dancing career. Anu has to compromise and get along with her hotel managers to get a dancing contract to earn money to educate Malathy. Meanwhile, Malathy's fiancée doesn't approve of her friendship with a club dancer, and asks Malathy to cut Anu out of her life. Though Malathy doesn't approve of her friend's way of earning a living, she cannot throw away 15 years of friendship. Malathy decides to cancel the marriage proposal in order to save her friendship. Anu goes to extreme measures to save her friend's love life.

== Cast ==
- Latha as Anu
- Sumithra as Malathy
- Srikanth as Karthik
- Sarath Babu
- Thengai Srinivasan
- V. Gopalakrishnan
- Savitri
- C. K. Saraswathi
- Udayalakshmi
- Baby Sumathi
- Baby Indira
- Master Sunil Kumar
- Karuppiah
- Ceylon Manohar
- Narayanan
- Natarajan
- Jothi Shanmugam
- Rajaram
- Panikkar

== Soundtrack ==
The music was composed by Ilaiyaraaja, with lyrics by Panchu Arunachalam. The song "Kaadhal Ennum Kaaviyam" is set to the raga Panthuravali, and "Idho Idho En Nenjile" is set to Mayamalavagowla.

| Song | Singers | Length |
|---|---|---|
| "Idho Idho En Nenjile" | S. Janaki, B. S. Sasirekha, Uma Devi | 05:13 |
| "Perazhagu Meni" | S. Janaki | 03:15 |
| "Kaadhal Ennum Kaaviyam" | Jikki | 04:35 |
| "Aadachonnare" | Jency | 03:23 |

== Reception ==
Naagai Dharuman of Anna praised the acting, dialogues, music, direction and cinematography but panned Latha's characterisation. According to Muthuraman, the film failed at the box-office. However Maharishi was completely satisfied with the film adaptation.

== Bibliography ==
- Dharap, B. V. (1979). Indian Films. Motion Picture Enterprises. OCLC 982194991.
- Sundararaman (2007) [2005]. Raga Chintamani: A Guide to Carnatic Ragas Through Tamil Film Music (2nd ed.). Pichhamal Chintamani. OCLC 295034757.
- Muthuraman, S. P. (2017) [2005]. AVM Thandha SPM (in Tamil) (3rd ed.). Vikatan. OCLC 607342391.
