= Rati Agnihotri =

Indian actress

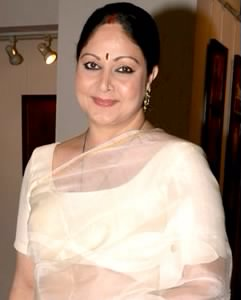
- Agnihotri in 2015
- Born: 10 December 1960 (age 65); Bareilly, Uttar Pradesh, India
- Other name: Rati Virwani
- Occupations: Model; actress
- Years active: 1979–1990; 2001–present
- Spouse: Anil Virwani (m. 1985)
- Children: Tanuj Virwani
- Relatives: Atul Agnihotri (cousin)

Rati Agnihotri (born 10 December 1960) is an Indian actress, known for acting in Hindi, as well as in Telugu and Tamil language films. Her roles in the cult-tragedy Ek Duuje Ke Liye (1981) and the drama film Tawaif (1985) earned her two nominations for the Filmfare Award for Best Actress.

== Early life ==
Agnihotri was born on 10 December 1960 in Bareilly, Uttar Pradesh, in a conservative Punjabi Brahmin family. She is a cousin of actor-director Atul Agnihotri.

== Career ==
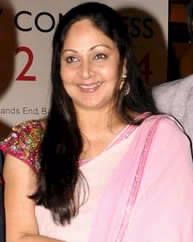
Agnihotri in 2012

She began modelling at the age of ten. Agnihotri's first film roles were in the Tamil language films Puthiya Vaarpugal and Niram Maaratha Pookkal (1979).

In the 1980s, she also starred in a number of Hindi films. She received a Filmfare nomination as Best Actress for the 1981 film Ek Duuje Ke Liye, which was a Hindi remake of the Telugu film Maro Charitra from 1979. Other Hindi films from this period included Farz Aur Kanoon (1982), Coolie (1983), Tawaif (1985) which also led to her being nominated for the Filmfare award, Aap Ke Saath (1986), and Hukumat (1987).

After a 16-year absence, she returned to acting in 2001, in the Hindi film Kuch Khatti Kuch Meethi and the Tamil film Majunu. She made her Malayalam debut in Anyar (2003), English debut in An Ode to Lost Love (2003), and Bengali debut in Aaina-te (2008).

She has also acted on the stage, in plays such as Please Divorce Me Darling (2005), and television serials, such as Sixer (2005). Agnihotri spends a lot of time in Poland, where she owns an Indian restaurant with her sister Anita.

== Personal life ==
Agnihotri married businessman and architect Anil Virwani on 9 February 1985, This, coupled with her father's death, convinced her to leave Hindi films. In 1986, the couple's son, Tanuj Virwani, was born. He is an actor working in Hindi films and television.

== Filmography ==
=== Films ===
Year	Film	Role	Language	Ref.
1979	Puthiya Vaarpugal	Jyothi	Tamil	
1979	Niram Maaratha Pookkal	Rathi	Tamil	
1979	Kadhal Killigal	Radha	Tamil	
1980	Veettukku Veedu Vasappadi	Jaya	Tamil	
1980	Ullasa Paravaigal	Nirmala	Tamil	
1980	Murattu Kaalai	Kannamma	Tamil	
1980	Anbukku Naan Adimai	Gowri	Tamil	
1980	Kaalinga		Kannada	
1980	Punnami Naagu	Lakshmi	Telugu	
1980	Andala Raasi		Telugu	
1980	Maayadhaari Krishnudu		Telugu	
1981	Prema Pichchi		Telugu	
1981	Jeevitha Ratham	Usha	Telugu	
1981	Jagamondi	Asha	Telugu	
1981	Bhogimanthulu		Telugu	
1981	Satyam Shivam	Rekha	Telugu	
1981	Tirugu Leni Manishi	Seeta	Telugu	
1981	Kazhugu	Hema	Tamil	
1981	Ek Duuje Ke Liye	Sapna	Hindi	
1981	Jeene Ki Arzoo	Laxmi	Hindi	
1981	Sahhas	Radha	Hindi	
1982	Shoukheeen	Anita	Hindi	
1982	Swami Dada	Seema	Hindi	
1982	Sumbandh		Hindi	
1982	Kaliyuga Ramudu	Sandhya	Telugu	
1982	Johny I Love You	Seema	Hindi	
1982	Farz Aur Kanoon	Poonam	Hindi	
1982	Ayaash	Mrs. Jaswant Singh	Hindi	
1982	Waqt Ke Shehzade		Hindi	
1982	Star	Maya	Hindi	
1983	Shubh Kaamna	Sujata	Hindi	
1983	Rishta Kagaz Ka	Aarti	Hindi	
1983	Pasand Apni Apni	Geeta	Hindi	
1983	Mazdoor	Smita	Hindi	
1983	Main Awara Hoon	Archana	Hindi	
1983	Mujhe Insaaf Chahiye	Malti	Hindi	
1983	Coolie	Julie D' Costa	Hindi	
1984	Srimadvirat Veerabrahmendra Swami Charitra	Raziya	Telugu	
1984	Rakta Bandhan	Roopa	Hindi	
1984	Paapi Pet Ka Sawaal Hai		Hindi	
1984	Mera Faisla	Rati	Hindi	
1984	Boxer	Rajni	Bengali, Hindi	
1984	All-rounder	Ritu	Hindi	
1984	Mashaal	Geeta (Press reporter)	Hindi	
1984	John Jani Janardhan	Madhu	Hindi	
1985	Zabardast	Sunita	Hindi	
1985	Pighalta Aasman	Anuradha	Hindi	
1985	Ulta Seedha	Shobha	Hindi	
1985	Triveni		Hindi	
1985	Karishma Kudrat Kaa	Radha	Hindi	
1985	Jaanoo	Kanchan	Hindi	
1985	Ek Se Bhale Do	Jenny	Hindi	
1985	Dekha Pyar Tumhara	Anu	Hindi	
1985	Bhawani Junction	Shaku	Hindi	
1985	Tawaif	Sultana	Hindi	
1985	Bepanaah	Advocate Bhavna	Hindi	
1985	Babu	Pinky	Hindi	
1986	Aap Ke Saath	Deepa/Salma	Hindi	
1986	Zindagani	Anuradha	Hindi	
1986	Begaana	Rama	Hindi	
1986	Ek Aur Sikander	Doctor Anita	Hindi	
1987	Dil Tujhko Diya	Rati	Hindi	
1987	Dadagiri	Deepa Singh	Hindi	
1987	Itihaas	Shobha	Hindi	
1987	Hukumat	Kusum Singh	Hindi	
1988	Zalzala	Radha	Hindi	
2001	Kuch Khatti Kuch Meethi	Archana Khanna	Hindi	
2001	Majunu	Heena's Mother	Tamil	
2001	Yaadein	Shalini (Guest appearance)	Hindi	
2002	Kranti	Sushma Singh	Hindi	
2002	Tumse Achcha Kaun Hai	Professor Dixit	Hindi	
2002	Na Tum Jaano Na Hum	Maya	Hindi	
2002	Yeh Hai Jalwa	Smita Mittal	Hindi	
2002	Kaante	Major's wife	Hindi	
2003	Chupke Se	Almera Kochar	Hindi	
2003	Anyar	Kamala	Malayalam	
2003	Dillagi... Yeh Dillagi		Hindi	
2004	Krishna Cottage	Sunita Menon	Hindi	
2004	Hum Tum	Anju Kapoor	Hindi	
2004	Dev	Dr. Bharti Singh	Hindi	
2004	Kyun...! Ho Gaya Na	Sulochana Khanna	Hindi	
2004	Dil Ne Jise Apna Kahaa	Dr. Shashi Rawat	Hindi	
2004	Shukriya: Till Death Do Us Apart		Hindi	
2004	Kis Kis Ki Kismat		Hindi	
2005	Socha Na Tha		Hindi	
2005	Pehchaan: The Face of Truth	Uttara Khanna	Hindi	
2006	Hot Money		Hindi	
2006	Rama Rama Kya Hai Dramaaa		Hindi	
2008	Jimmy		Hindi	
2008	Aaina Te		Bengali	
2008	Ru Ba Ru		Hindi	
2008	Love Has No Language		Hindi	
2009	Phir Kabhi		Hindi	
2009	Karma Aur Holi		Hindi	
2009	Luck	Mrs. Anushka Mehra	Hindi	
2009	Chal Chalein		Hindi	
2009	Blue Oranges		Hindi	
2009	Aao Wish Karein		Hindi	
2011	Bin Bulaye Baraati		Hindi	
2011	Chatur Singh Two Star		Hindi	
2012	Diary of a Butterfly	Shobha	Hindi	
2013	Ardhangini	Savitri	Hindi	
2013	Dehraadun Diary		Hindi	
2014	Shaadi Ke Side Effects	Mrs. Malik	Hindi	
2014	Spark		Hindi	
2014	Purani Jeans		Hindi	
2015	Second Hand Husband		Hindi	
2015	Singh is Bling	Harpreet Kaur	Hindi	
2015	Karbonn		Hindi	
2016	Ranviir The Marshal	Ayesha	Hindi	
2016	Dictator	Mahima Rai	Telugu	
2023	Khela Hobe	Ruksana	Hindi	
TBA	Tomchi		Hindi	

=== Television ===
Year	Title	Role	Notes
2001	Kabhi To Milenge		TV debut
2006–2007	Kaajjal	Nayantara Pratapsingh	
2006	Jhalak Dikhhla Jaa 1	Contestant	7th place

== Awards and nominations ==
Year	Award	Category	Film	Result	Ref.
1982:	Filmfare Awards	Filmfare Award for Best Actress	Ek Duuje Ke Liye	Nominated	
1986	Filmfare Awards	Filmfare Award for Best Actress	Tawaif	Nominated	
