= Aarilirunthu Arubathu Varai =

1979 film by S. P. Muthuraman

- Theatrical release poster
- Directed by: S. P. Muthuraman
- Written by: Panchu Arunachalam
- Produced by: Meena Panchu Arunachalam
- Starring: Rajinikanth; Jayalaxmi; Cho; Sangeeta; Jaya
- Cinematography: Babu
- Edited by: R. Vittal; T. K. Rajan
- Music by: Ilaiyaraaja
- Production company: P. A. Arts Productions
- Release date: 14 September 1979
- Running time: 138 minutes
- Country: India
- Language: Tamil

Aarilirunthu Arubathu Varai (transl. From 6 to 60) is a 1979 Indian Tamil-language drama film, directed by S. P. Muthuraman and written by Panchu Arunachalam, starring Rajinikanth. The cast also included Jayalaxmi, Cho, Sangeeta, Thengai Seenivasan, Jaya and Thilak. Soundtrack for the film was composed by Ilaiyaraaja.

The film portrays the life of Santhanam, the eldest son of a poor widow who struggles to make ends meet. He spends the first half of his life toiling day and night to provide his younger siblings an education and spends second half watching them leading comfortable lives, while he continues his struggle for survival.

Aarilirunthu Arubathu Varai was released on 14 September 1979. The film was screened for 25 weeks in the Midland theatre, Chennai. It was remade into Telugu as Maharaju (1985) and in Kannada as Poorna Chandra (1987).

== Plot ==
The story begins with a family man who has a wife and four children. He values the present moment and wants to lead a luxurious life along with his family. He spends a lot of his earnings rather than saving. Suddenly, one day, when his eldest son is just six years old, he dies in a road accident after getting heavily drunk. The eldest boy, Santhanam, visits his father's boss and asks for a job. He gets a job at the printing press and learns a trade running the printing press. He also does many other odd jobs. He aspires to give his siblings the comfort that his father wanted for his family.

All four children grow up and their mother dies suddenly. While Santhanam continues working in the print press, his siblings go to college. He seeks the help of his friend and his boss, asking them for money as and when he requires for his siblings' studies. Santhanam and a co-worker fall in love, but she breaks off when she learns of his numerous debts and continuing responsibilities towards his siblings. Santhanam's sister falls in love with a rich man and Santhanam feels he needs to give a suitable dowry to get his sister married to the rich man. His younger brother advises him not to give a dowry as the groom did not ask for it and also because they cannot afford a dowry. Santhanam goes ahead with the dowry and finds he is short of money, despite help from his friend and boss. In desperation, he marries Lakshmi when he is promised a sum of money. But it turns out to be a false promise. He then goes to a loan shark to obtain money. Later his sister ill treats him during his visit to their home mocking at his cheap gift to her new born baby.

Santhanam's younger brother (L. I. C. Narasimhan) graduates and gets a good job. Santhanam believes that his brother will help improving their family condition. But he doesn't help out Santhanam financially and becomes selfish purchasing expensive dresses and a watch only for him. He says that Santhanam's money problems were brought onto himself. Santhanam and his brother get into quarrel and his brother leaves the home and marries his friend. Santhanam's situation gets worse with his friend Cho losing his job and his boss falling ill. The printing press is now managed by the son of his ex-boss who does not like Santhanam as he has borrowed so much money from his father. Santhanam's new boss ask him to repay the money he owed to his father or else resign his job. Santhanam loses his job and he half-heartedly attempts to get help from his well-off siblings and fails. Unable to pay rent, he, his wife and child move to a slum. Santhanam gets a job as a proof reader, his wife earns some money doing some sewing and they have another child. Santhanam develops an interest to write and completes his first novel. His friend Cho, who has also recovered, publishes it. On the day that the book is available, Santhanam's wife leaves her kids at home to go to the market. In her absence, a fire occurs in the slum area. She rushes back to save her children and is badly burnt in the fire. She dies and Santhanam gets a sum of money from an insurance policy that she had secretly taken up. His friend suggests that they produce their own newspaper and this goes well. Santhanam becomes a popular novelist, winning a writer's award and he becomes rich. His siblings also unite with him considering that he is a celebrity now other than being very rich.

He is now 60 years old and he doesn't reject them, he knows though, that it was his wife who was there for him through the hard times. Santhanam's children leave for USA to pursue their higher education thanks to Cho who managed his finances and the press they started with Santhanam bringing in the creative input. The movie ends with Santhanam in a chair looking at his wife's photo and thinking about the opportunistic behaviour of his siblings and the meaninglessness of life.

== Cast ==
- Rajinikanth as Santhanam
- Fatafat Jayalaxmi as Lakshmi
- Cho as Alagappan
- Sangeeta as Amutha
- Thengai Srinivasan as Santhanam's father
- Jaya as Kamala
- T. K. Bhagavathi as Santhanam's boss
- Suruli Rajan as Naidu
- LIC Narasimhan as Raghu, Santhanam's brother
- T. K. S. Natarajan as Seshadri
- Thilak

== Production ==
During production, Rajinikanth had misgivings whether the audience would accept him in such a melodrama since he had been an entertainer till then. However, S. P. Muthuraman convinced him and showed him 5,000 feet (1,500 m) of the edited version; he was highly impressed, and then showed great involvement in its making. Rajinikanth and Muthuraman had differences of opinion every day during the film's shooting, and Panchu Arunachalam used to interfere frequently and tell Rajinikanth to listen to the director. The make-up for Rajinikanth was done by R. Sundaramoorthy and according to him, the old look of Rajinikanth was influenced by Leo Tolstoy. The filming began at AVM Studios with scenes of Rajinikanth and Jaya being shot.

== Soundtrack ==
Soundtrack was composed by Ilaiyaraaja, with lyrics by Panchu Arunachalam. The song "Kanmaniye Kadhal" is set in Mohanam raga.

Track listing
No.	Title	Singer(s)	Length
1.	"Kanmaniyae Kadhal Enbathu"	S. P. Balasubrahmanyam, S. Janaki	4:27
2.	"Vaazhkkayae Vesham"	Jayachandran	4:29
3.	"Aan Pillai Endralum"	S. P. Sailaja, Sasirekha	4:32
4.	"Theme"	Ilaiyaraaja	3:03
Total length:			16:31

== Reception ==
Kausikan of Kalki praised Rajinikanth's performance, citing he proved he can perform emotional roles too while also appreciating Arunachalam's screenplay and Muthuraman's direction but felt there were overdose of emotions still it can be enjoyed by general audience. He concluded calling it a good film which takes us back to the time of 1940s (only in terms of concept). Naagai Dharuman of Anna praised the acting of cast, cinematography, music, dialogues and appreciating Muthuraman for giving a quality family drama but felt he could have made it brisker in the latter half and concluded this film will attract womenfolk and general audience. The film was screened for 25 weeks in the Midland theatre, Chennai.
