= Ramanathan =

Ramanathan ராமநாதன் இராமநாதன்
- Pronunciation: Rāmanātaṉ
- Gender: Male
- Language: Tamil

Origin
- Meaning: Lord of Rama
- Region of origin: Southern India; North-eastern Sri Lanka

Other names
- Short form: Nathan
- Derived: Rama

Ramanathan (Tamil: ராமநாதன்) is a South Indian male given name. Due to the South Indian tradition of using patronymic surnames it may also be a surname for males and females. Ramanathan is derived from Rama (a Hindu god) and the Sanskrit word nath, meaning "lord". The name Ramanathan is given to the Hindu god Shiva at Rameshwaram, one of the southernmost towns in India. Hindus believe that Lord Rama worshipped Shiva before beginning his journey to Lanka; hence "Lord of Rama". This name is from the history of great epics.

== Notable people ==
=== Given name ===
- Annamalai Ramanathan (1946–1993), Indian mathematician
- Devakottai Ramanathan, Indian comedian
- G. Ramanathan (died 1963), Indian composer
- K. G. Ramanathan (1920–1992), Indian mathematician
- K. R. Ramanathan (1893–1984), Indian physicist and meteorologist
- M. Ramanathan, Indian politician
- M. D. Ramanathan (1923–1984), Indian composer and vocalist
- N. Ramanathan (born 1946), Indian musician and academic
- Pathmanathan Ramanathan (1932–2006), Sri Lankan lawyer and judge
- Ponnambalam Ramanathan (1851–1930), Ceylonese politician
- R. Ramanathan Chettiar (1913–1995), Indian businessman, politician and bureaucrat
- Rama Ramanathan (born 1964), Indian politician
- Ramkumar Ramanathan (born 1994), Indian tennis player
- S. Kumara Kurubara Ramanathan, Indian politician
- S. Ramanathan (1917–1988), musician
- Sellapan Ramanathan (1924–2016), Singaporean politician
- Veerabhadran Ramanathan, Indian climatologist

=== Surname ===
- Erik Ramanathan, American ambassador
- Leelawathy Ramanathan (1870–?), Australian author and publisher
- Ramanathan Indrarajah, Sri Lankan politician
- Ramanathan Gnanadesikan (1932–2015), Indian statistician
- Ramanathan Krishnan (born 1937), Indian tennis player
- Ramanathan V. Guha (born 1965), Indian computer scientist
- Ramanathan Sarathkumar (born 1954), Indian film actor, journalist and politician
- Ramkumar Ramanathan (born 1994), Indian tennis player
- Sharada Ramanathan, Indian journalist
- Mohan Ramanathan (born 1954), Indian Entrepreneur, Founder promoter, Advanced Construction Technologies Pvt Ltd, Chennai
