= Panchu Arunachalam =

Indian writer and producer (1941-2016)

- Panchu Arunachalam at the SIIMA awards
- Born: Panchanathan Arunachalam; 22 March 1941; Sirukoodalpatti, Karaikudi, Tamil Nadu
- Died: 9 August 2016 (aged 75); Chennai, Tamil Nadu, India
- Occupations: Producer, screenwriter, director, lyricist
- Years active: 1963-2016
- Spouse: Meena
- Children: 4, including Subbu Panchu

Panchanathan Arunachalam (22 March 1941 – 9 August 2016) was an Indian writer, director, producer and lyricist who worked in the Tamil cinema. He was mentored by poet Kannadasan who was his uncle. He also worked as a lyricist in the Tamil cinema industry. He started producing films under his production banner named P. A. Arts. His son Subbu Panchu Arunachalam is an actor and dubbing artist in the Tamil film industry.

== Career ==
In 2004, Panchu Arunachalam chose to return to work as a director and planned a film titled Ganesha with Cheran in the lead role. However, the film eventually did not materialise.

== Filmography ==
=== As director ===
- Manamagale Vaa (1988)
- Puthu Paatu (1990)
- Thambi Pondatti (1992)
- Kalikaalam (1992)

=== As a writer and producer ===
Year	Film	Credited as		Notes
Year	Film	Writer	Producer	Notes
1963	Ratha Thilagam	No	Yes	
1972	Thiruneelakandar	Yes	No	Co-written with Kannadasan
1972	Hello Partner	Yes	No	
1974	Kalyanamam Kalyananam	Yes	No	
1974	Ungal Viruppam	Yes	No	
1974	Engamma Sapatham	Yes	No	
1975	Avanthan Manithan	Dialogues	No	
1975	Thottadhellam Ponnaagum	Yes	No	
1975	Mayangukiral Oru Maadhu	Yes	No	
1975	Uravu Solla Oruvan	Yes	No	
1976	Thunive Thunai	Yes	No	
1976	Annakili	Yes	No	
1977	Avar Enakke Sontham	Yes	Yes	
1977	Kavikkuyil	Yes	No	
1977	Bhuvana Oru Kelvi Kuri	Yes	No	
1977	Gaayathri	Yes	No	
1978	Kaatrinile Varum Geetham	Yes	No	
1978	Ithu Eppadi Irukku	Yes	No	
1978	Vattathukkul Chaduram	Yes	No	
1978	Sakka Podu Podu Raja	Yes	No	
1978	Priya	Yes	No	
1979	Kavari Maan	Yes	Co-producer	
1979	Kalyanaraman	Yes	Yes	
1979	Aarilirunthu Arubathu Varai	Yes	Yes	
1979	Vetrikku Oruvan	Yes	No	
1979	Niram Maaratha Pookkal	Yes	No	
1980	Rusi Kanda Poonai	Yes	Yes	
1980	Ullasa Paravaigal	Yes	No	
1980	Murattu Kaalai	Yes	No	
1981	Kazhugu	Yes	Yes	
1981	Ellam Inba Mayyam	Yes	Yes	
1981	Kadal Meengal	Yes	No	
1982	Anandha Ragam	Yes	Yes	
1982	Magane Magane	Yes	Yes	
1982	Enkeyo Ketta Kural	Yes	Yes	
1982	Pokkiri Raja	Yes	No	
1982	Sakalakala Vallavan	Yes	No	
1983	Veetula Raman Veliyila Krishnan	No	Yes	
1983	Paayum Puli	Yes	No	
1983	Salangai Oli	Dialogues	No	
1983	Adutha Varisu	Yes	No	
1983	Mann Vasanai	Dialogues	No	
1983	Thoongadhey Thambi Thoongadhey	Yes	No	
1984	Kuva Kuva Vaathugal	Yes	Yes	
1984	Vaazhkai	Yes	No	
1984	Thambikku Entha Ooru	Yes	Yes	
1985	Japanil Kalyanaraman	Yes	Yes	
1985	Nalla Thambi	Yes	No	
1985	Uyarndha Ullam	Yes	No	
1985	Puthiya Theerppu	Yes	No	
1987	Ullam Kavarndha Kalvan	Yes	No	
1987	Paruva Ragam	Dialogues	No	
1987	Manithan	Yes	No	
1988	Guru Sishyan	Yes	Yes	
1988	En Jeevan Paduthu	Yes	Yes	
1988	Manamagale Vaa	Yes	No	
1988	Dharmathin Thalaivan	Yes	No	
1989	Rajadhi Raja	Yes	No	
1989	Apoorva Sagodharargal	Yes	No	
1989	Raja Chinna Roja	Yes	No	
1989	Mappillai	Yes	No	
1990	Michael Madhana Kamarajan	No	Yes	
1990	Athisaya Piravi	Yes	No	
1990	Engitta Mothathay	Yes	No	
1991	Dharma Durai	Yes	No	
1992	Thambi Pondatti	No	Yes	
1992	Raasukutti	No	Yes	
1992	Pandiyan	Yes	No	
1992	Singaravelan	Yes	No	
1993	Enga Muthalali	No	Yes	
1994	Veera	Yes	Yes	
1994	Vanaja Girija	Yes	Yes	
1995	Mayabazar	Yes	Yes	
1995	Thottil Kuzhandhai	Yes	No	
1996	Alexander	Yes	Yes	
1999	Poovellam Kettuppar	No	Yes	
2001	Rishi	Yes	Yes	
2002	Solla Marandha Kadhai	No	Yes	
2003	Unnai Paartha Naal Mudhal	Dialogues	No	
2005	Chanakya	Yes	No	
2007	Mayakannadi	No	Co-producer	

=== As lyricist ===
Year	Film	Songs
1962	Sarada	Manamagale Marumagale
1963	Kattu Roja	Ennai Paaru
1963	Aasai Alaigal	Nadanthu Vandha
1963	Naanum Oru Penn	Poopola poopola
1963	Ezhai Pangalan	Thaayaga Marava and Manathil Enna Mayakkam
1964	Alli	Ennunga Ennai Theriyuma and Nalungu Paadaya
1964	Amma Enge	Amma Amma Enge Pone
1965	Vallavanukku Vallavan	Kandalum Kandene
1965	Paditha Manaivi	Appa Oru Kannu
1965	Kalangarai Vilakkam	Ennai Marandhadhaen and Ponnezhil Poothadhu
1965	Kanni Thai	All songs
1966	Kathal Paduthum Padu	Alli Chendathuthe
1966	Madras to Pondicherry	Malar Pondra Paruvame
1971	Deivam Pesuma	Netru Paarthathellam and Ondre Ondru Than
1971	Veguli Penn	Neethan Mohiniyo
1976	Annakili	All songs
1976	Uravaadum Nenjam	All songs
1977	Aalukkoru Aasai	All songs
1977	Avar Enakke Sontham	Kabhi Kabhi, Oru Veedu, Surangani and Thenil Aadum
1977	Kavikuyil	All songs
1977	Thunai Iruppal Meenakshi	All songs
1977	Bhuvana Oru Kelvi Kuri	All songs
1977	Gaayathri	All songs
1977	Sainthadamma Sainthadu	All songs
1978	Kaatrinile Varum Geetham	All songs
1978	Vaazha Ninaiththal Vazhalam	Veenai Meetum Kaigale
1978	Maariyamman Thiruvizha	Pozhuthu Eppo and Sirithal Sirithen
1978	Ithu Eppadi Irukku	All songs
1978	Vattathukkul Chaduram	All songs
1978	Mullum Malarum	Adi Penne
1978	Priya	All songs
1979	Kavari Maan	All songs
1979	Poonthalir	Manathil Yenna, Raja Chinna Raja and Vaan Ponmayile
1979	Kalyanaraman	All songs
1979	Niram Maratha Pookal	Aayiram Malargale and Niram Mara Pookale
1979	Aarilirunthu Arubathu Varai	All songs
1979	Vetrikku Oruvan	All songs
1980	Nadhiyai Thedi Vandha Kadal	All songs
1980	Ullasa Paravaigal	All songs
1980	Poottaatha Poottukkal	All songs
1980	Anbukku Naan Adimai	Kaattiloru Singakuttiyam and Onedrodu Onedranaom
1980	Guru	Naan Vanangugiren
1980	Nizhalgal	Dhoorathil Naan Kanda
1980	Nenjathai Killathe	Paruvame
1980	Murattu Kaalai	All songs
1980	Rusi Kanda Poonai	Anbu Mugam, En Nenjam and Kanna Nee Enge
1981	Kanni Theevu	All songs
1981	Meendum Kokila	Hey Oraiyiram and Ponnaana Meni
1981	Kazhugu	All songs
1981	Kadal Meengal	Endrendrum Anandhame
1981	Alaigal Oivathillai	Kadhal Oviyam
1981	Garjanai	Enna Sugamana and Varuvai Anbe
1981	Karaiyellam Shenbagapoo	Kaadellam and Yeriyile
1981	Ellam Inba Mayyam	All songs
1981	Oomai Ullangal	Thulirvidum and Vazhavaitha
1982	Anandha Ragam	Kadaloram and Megam Karukkuthu
1982	Magane Magane	Madhu Malargale and Per Solla Vantha
1982	Thanikattu Raja	Mullai Arumbe
1982	Kadhal Oviyam	Kuyile Kuyile
1982	Enkeyo Ketta Kural	All songs except Thaayum Naanai
1982	Rani Theni	Ramanukke Seethai
1982	Kozhi Koovuthu	Veeraiyya Veeraiyya
1983	Veetula Raman Veliyila Krishnan	All songs except Aathu Pakkam
1983	Adutha Varisu	Aasai Nooruvagai, Kaveriye and Pesakoodathu
1983	Mann Vasanai	Anantha Then
1984	Kuva Kuva Vaathugal	All songs
1984	Vaazhkai	Yaavum Ayyappa
1984	Thambikku Entha Ooru	All songs
1984	Ambigai Neril Vanthaal	Kalyana Chelai
1984	Vaidehi Kathirunthal	Megam Karukayilae
1985	En Selvame	All songs except Naan Vaazha
1986	Neethane Antha Kuyil	En Jeevan Paduthu
1987	Ullam Kavarntha Kalvan	All songs except Kalangathale Oru Padam
1988	Irandil Ondru	Sangeetha Poo, Thanga Kudam, Inge Ellarum and Kadhalukku Thoodhu
1988	En Jeevan Paduthu	All songs except Engirundho Azhaikkum
1988	Dharmathin Thalaivan	Muthamizh Kaviye
1988	Manamagale Vaa	All songs except Tell me
1989	Mappillai	Ennathan Sugamo
1990	Michael Madana Kama Rajan	Kadha Kelu and Sundari Neeyum
1990	Puthu Paatu	Intha Bhoomiye Enga
1991	Dharma Durai	All songs except Aannenna
1992	Thambi Pondatti	Kannan Vantha and Sonnalum
1992	Pandiyan	Paandiyanin Raajyathil
1992	Raasukutti	Adi Naan Pudicha and Holi Holi
1993	Chinna Kannamma	Enthan Vazhkaiyin and Thayilla Pillai
1993	Enga Muthalali	Marumagale
1994	Veera	Aathile Annakili, Adi Pandhalile and Konji Konji
1994	Vietnam Colony	Enakku Ullathellam
1994	Vanaja Girija	Siragadikkuthu and Thirumagal Un
1995	Thottil Kuzhandhai	All songs
1995	Mayabazar	All songs except Naan Poranthathu
1995	Chandralekha	Ammadi Aathadi and Vanji Ponnu
1996	Aruva Velu	Yemma Indha Rathiri
1996	Alexander	Rajarajan Naane
1998	Kavalai Padathe Sagodhara	Thiruvonam Thirunalam, Iswar Allah and Chinna Chinna
2017	Muthuramalingam	All songs

== Awards ==
- Won, 1982 - Tamil Nadu State Film Award for Best Dialogue Writer for Engeyo Ketta Kural
- Won, 2016 - SIIMA Lifetime Achievement Award
