= Bezubaan =

- Poster
- Directed by: Bapu
- Written by: Ved Rahi (Dialogues)
- Screenplay by: Bhushan Banmali
- Based on: Mayangukiral Oru Maadhu (Tamil)
- Produced by: Pranlal Mehta
- Starring: Shashi Kapoor; Reena Roy; Raj Kiran; Naseeruddin Shah
- Cinematography: Baba Azmi
- Edited by: N. Chandra
- Music by: Raamlaxman
- Release date: 1982
- Country: India
- Language: Hindi

Bezubaan (transl. Unspoken) is a 1982 Indian Hindi-language film directed by Bapu and produced by Pranlal Mehta. The film stars Shashi Kapoor, Reena Roy, Raj Kiran and Naseeruddin Shah. It is a remake of the Tamil film Mayangukiral Oru Maadhu. The film was a box office failure.

== Plot ==
This is the story of a girl named Kalpana (Reena Roy), who stays in the women's hostel. She soon falls into wrong ways. She meets Raman and falls in love with him. She becomes pregnant and tries to commit suicide, but fails. Her roommate, Revati (Reeta Bhaduri), helps her out from this frustration. After some days, Kalpana marries Kumar (Shashi Kapoor), while Revati marries Shivnath (Naseruddin Shah). Kumar is a rich industrialist, whereas Shivnath is a struggling photographer. Shivnath soon starts blackmailing Kalpana, as he has photographs of Kalpana and Raman. In an accident, Kalpana gets injured and Raman, who is a taxi driver, helps her. Kalpana finally reveals everything to Kumar and Shivnath feels guilty for his act.

== Cast ==
- Shashi Kapoor as Kumar
- Reena Roy as Kalpana
- Raj Kiran as Raman
- Naseeruddin Shah as Shivnath
- Rita Bhaduri as Revati aka Meera Bai
- Seema Deo as Vidya
- Iftekhar as Amarnath, Kalpana's Dad
- Yunus Parvez as Seth Kalidas, Raman's Father
- Murad as Mr. Khanna
- Master Nadeem as Kumar and Kalpana's Son
- Guddi Maruti as Kalpana's Friend

== Music ==
Song title	Singer(s)
"Gaon Galiyo Phulo Kaliyo, Gaur Se Suno, Yeh Hai Meri Dulhan Tum Inse Milo"	Kishore Kumar, Asha Bhosle
"Har Ek Jeevan Hai Ek Khaani"	Lata Mangeshkar
"Tera Jaise Koi" (Sad)	Kishore Kumar
"Tere Jaisa Koi Khubsurat Nahi"	Kishore Kumar
"Chhodo Chhodo Mera Haath"	Behroz Chatterjee
"Ye Mausham Hai Matwala, Dil Gadbad Jhala"	Vinod Sehgal, Asha Bhosle
