= Rajinikanth: The Definitive Biography =

Book by Naman Ramachandran

- Cover of the first edition
- Author: Naman Ramachandran
- Language: English
- Genre: Biography
- Publisher: New Delhi, Penguin Viking
- Publication date: 12 December 2012
- Publication place: India
- Media type: Print (hardcover and paperback)
- Pages: 290 pp.
- ISBN: 9780670086207
- OCLC: 825198202

Rajinikanth: The Definitive Biography is a 2012 biography of the Indian actor Rajinikanth, written by Naman Ramachandran.

== Background ==
Naman Ramachandran writes for Sight & Sound and Variety and has previously authored Lights, Camera, Masala: Making Movies in Mumbai. Ramachandran wanted to meet Rajinikanth when he began his work on the book but was not allowed to meet him because of health. Later, Rajinikanth sent him a note. The author said that he had "tried to humanise Rajinikanth". Ramachandran met various people involved in Tamil, Telugu, and Kannada films, Rajinikanth's brother, Rajinikanth's daughters Soundarya and Aishwarya, and his friends and acquaintances.

Naman also searched Wikipedia and found that a fact about the actor's early life was wrong. His mother had died when he was nine years old and not five as the online encyclopedia claimed. Ramachandran watched each of his films twice and was spending so much time on his research work that his wife said that she had "lost [him] to Rajinikanth" for those two years. Ramachandran met Rajinikanth while the book's subject was filming for Kochadaiiyaan (2014) in London. Prepared after two years of research, the book was released on 12 December 2012. A second edition was released in paperback form in January 2014. Ramachandran has stated that he would aim to make a third edition of the book if Penguin India agrees.

== Summary ==
The book includes details about Rajinikanth's early life, struggle, films, personal life, and stardom. At the beginning of his career, Rajinikanth mostly played supporting and negative roles. Half of the fees he charges for every film are spent on charity. Several anecdotes are included. Plot details and analysis of several of his films are also included. Rajinikanth acted in the 1977 Telugu film Chilakamma Cheppindi alongside Sripriya. He wished to act with the Kannada actor Rajkumar but could not do so. His 50th film was Tiger. He had said that he would write an autobiography only if he became courageous enough like Mahatma Gandhi whose biography The Story of My Experiments with Truth revealed many unknown facts about him.

Rajinikanth worked as an office boy, a coolie, a carpenter, in Mysore Machinery, and at one time earned money by loading rice sacks. He obtained a bus conductor license by appearing for an exam. He later became a friend of the bus driver. When he was working as a conductor in Bangalore he became very popular among passengers due to his style of issuing tickets and returning the change. They wanted to travel only by the bus which had Rajinikanth. It was during this time he acted in stage plays, watched a lot of films, and imitated Sivaji Ganesan, Rajkumar, and M. G. Ramachandran. He said that Ganesan was the reason he has been in cinema. He joined the Madras Film Institute to learn acting skills. Director K. Balachander named him after A V M Rajan's character in the film Major Chandrakanth (1966).

== Reception ==
Sadanand Menon, writing for India Today, criticised the book. He compared Tamil film actors' biographers to the ones "who light a candle to look at the sun". He said that the author was "totally mixed up about whether he [was] writing a 'biography' or a 'filmography'." Anurag Kashyap, Suresh Krissna, Rajiv Menon, Sreenivasan and Rajinikanth himself praised the book. Writing for Daily News and Analysis, Kaushani Banerjee praised the author and said that he had "[entered] into the soul of the persona of the star". Banerjee credited Ramachandran for "[doing] complete justice in explaining the Rajinikanth phenomenon." Joginder Tuteja of Bollywood Hungama called it "just an above average read" and praised Gayathri Sreekanth's book The Name Is Rajinikanth by calling it a paisa vasool (worth its money).
