= Lights, Camera, Masala =

Book by Naman Ramachandran

Lights, Camera, Masala: Making Movies in Mumbai
- Front Cover
- Editor: Divya Thakur
- Author: Naman Ramachandran
- Illustrator: Sheena Sippy
- Language: English
- Subject: Bollywood
- Published: Mumbai: India Book House, 2006
- Publisher: India Book House
- Publication place: India
- Pages: 246 pp.
- ISBN: 9788175084414
- OCLC: 71428530

Lights, Camera, Masala: Making Movies in Mumbai is a 2006 book by Naman Ramachandran, published by India Book House and designed by Divya Thakur of Design Temple. The concept and photography were by Sheena Sippy. In 2007, the book won a Gold for Publication Design at the New York Festival. It was the author's first book. A complete insider look in the glitz, grit and grandeur of world's largest film industry, Bollywood.

Photographs of Abhishek Bachchan, Aishwarya Rai Bachchan, Salman Khan, Shah Rukh Khan, Preity Zinta and Bipasha Basu were also included.

== Reception ==
Hindustan Times review said "I flipped through this hardback on Bollywood films twice before reading a word within its glossy covers. The first time, I turned the pages quickly and curiously and I was impressed - actually blown away - because Lights Camera Masala is a design surprise."

Kaveree Bamzai of India Today described the book's design as "distractingly overwhelming" and asked whether one should see it, read it or tear it. Ramachandran's interviews of several actors were also included.

Bamzai praised the photographs by saying that they had "repose which blinds us to their ubiquity". The book had 10 chapters. They were "The spark", "The reality", "The game is afoot", "The shoot 1", "Objects of desire", "The shoot 2", "Young Turks", "From pillar to post", "Brand Bollywood" and "The people have spoken". It discussed all the steps a film is involved in before being released; script, cast selection, filming, costumes and marketing. The presentation of the content in the book is very good and catchy that binds the reader to it.

Arati Menon Carroll of Business Standard wrote "Despite being sponsored by the International Indian Film Academy, Lights... commendably is not slavish in its critique of the industry. There are unapologetic mentions of plagiarism, like the similarities between portions of Munna Bhai M.B.B.S. and Robin Williams's Patch Adams."
