= Naman Ramachandran =

Indian author and journalist

Naman Ramachandran is an Indian-born critic and journalist. He is the author of Rajinikanth: The Definitive Biography (Penguin, 2012) and Lights Camera Masala: Making Movies in Mumbai (IBH, 2006). He writes for Variety, Sight & Sound, and Cineuropa. Based in London, England, he is also on the steering group of the London Indian Film Festival. He also wrote the independent film Brahman Naman, which premiered at the 2016 Sundance Film Festival.

== Early life ==
Naman Ramachandran grew up in Thrissur, Kerala, India and later moved to Bangalore, Karnataka. He graduated with a Master of Science (MSc) in Media Management from the University of Stirling in Scotland. He also studied at the Asian College of Journalism in Chennai.

== Works ==
- "Imagine Asia - Going South - We've all heard of Bollywood, but other areas of India produce equally stunning arthouse and commercial films in greater numbers. Naman Ramachandran investigates". Sight & Sound. 12 (5). London: British Film Institute: 20. 2002. ISSN 0037-4806.
- Lights, Camera, Masala: Making Movies in Mumbai. Mumbai: India Book House. 2006. ISBN 9788175084414. OCLC 71428530.
- Rajinikanth: The Definitive Biography. New Delhi: Viking. 2012. ISBN 9780670086207. OCLC 825198202.
