= List of Telugu films of 1985 =

This is a list of films produced by the Tollywood (Telugu language film industry) based in Hyderabad in the year 1985.

== 1985 ==
Title	Director	Cast	Genre	Music	Notes
Aatmabalam	T. L. V. Prasad	Nandamuri Balakrishna, Bhanupriya	Musical Thriller		
Adavi Donga	K. Raghavendra Rao	Chiranjeevi, Radha, Sharada, Rao Gopal Rao	Drama	K. Chakravarthy	
Agni Parvatam	K. Raghavendra Rao	Krishna, Vijayashanti, Radha, Sharada	Action	K. Chakravarthy	
America Alludu	K. Vasu	Suman, Bhanupriya	Romance	K. Chakravarthy	
Anveshana	Vamsy	Karthik, Bhanupriya, Sharath Babu, Satyanarayana Kaikala	Thriller	Ilaiyaraaja	
Babai Abbai	Jandhyala	Nandamuri Balakrishna, Anitha Reddy			
Bangaru Chilaka	Anil Kumar	Arjun, Bhanupriya, Subhalekha Sudhakar		S. P. Balasubrahmanyam	
Bhale Thammudu	Paruchuri Brothers	Nandamuri Balakrishna, Urvashi	Action		
Bharyabhartala Bandham	V. B. Rajendra Prasad	Akkineni Nageshwara Rao, Nandamuri Balakrishna, Jayasudha, Rajani	Drama	K. Chakravarthy	
Bullet	Bapu	Krishnam Raju, Suhasini	Action		
Chattamtho Poratam	K. Bapayya	Chiranjeevi, Madhavi, Sumalatha		K. Chakravarthy	
Chiranjeevi	C. V. Rajendran	Chiranjeevi, Vijayashanti, Bhanupriya			
Dampatyam	A. Kodandarami Reddy	ANR, Jayasudha	Drama		
Darja Donga	Manivannan	Suman, Vijayashanti	Thriller	Ilaiyaraaja	
Devalayam	T. Krishna	Shoban Babu, Vijayashanti		K. Chakravarthy	
Donga	A. Kodandarami Reddy	Chiranjeevi, Radha, Giribabu, Kota Srinivasa Rao	Action	K. Chakravarthy	
Dongala Vetagadu	K. Raghavendra Rao	Kamal Haasan, Radhika, Pandari Bai		Ilaiyaraaja	
Illale Devata	T. L. V. Prasad	ANR, Radhika, Bhanupriya	Drama		
Jwala	Raviraja Pinisetty	Chiranjeevi, Bhanupriya, Radhika		Ilaiyaraaja	
Kattula Kondayya	S. B. Chakravarthy	Nandamuri Balakrishna, Sumalatha	Action		
Kongu Mudi	Vijaya Bapineedu	Shoban Babu, Jayasudha, Suhasini		S. P. Balasubrahmanyam	
Kotha Pelli Koothuru	K. S. Rami Reddy	Chandra Mohan, Vijayashanti, Rajendra Prasad	Drama		
Maa Pallelo Gopaludu	Kodi Ramakrishna	Arjun, Poornima, Gollapudi		K. V. Mahadevan	
Maha Manishi	M. Balaiah	Krishna, Jaya Prada, Radha	Action		
Maha Sangramam	A. Kodandarami Reddy	Krishna, Shoban Babu, Jaya Pradha, Sharada		K. Chakravarthy	
Maharaju	Vijaya Bapineedu	Shoban Babu, Suhasini		K. Chakravarthy	
Manthra Dandam	Kommineni Seshagiri Rao	Kanta Rao, Sudarshan		K. Chakravarthy	
Mogudu Pellalu	Jandhyala	Naresh, Bhanupriya, Subhalekha Sudhakar		Ramesh Naidu	
Muchataga Mugguru	Relangi Narasimha Rao	Chandra Mohan, Rajendra Prasad, Thulasi, Poornima, Nirmalamma, Giri Babu	Action	K. V. Mahadevan	
Nyayam Meere Cheppali	G. Rammohan Rao	Suman, Jayasudha			
Oka Radha Iddaru Krishnulu	A. Kodandarami Reddy	Kamal Haasan, Sridevi, Satyanarayana Kaikala, Nirmalamma	Comedy	Ilaiyaraaja	
Pachani Kapuram	T. Rama Rao	Krishna, Sridevi, Jaggayya, Sowcar Janaki	Romance, Drama	K. Chakravarthy	
Palnati Simham	A. Kodandarami Reddy	Krishna, Jayasudha, Radha, Sharada		K. Chakravarthy	
Pattabhishekam	K. Raghavendra Rao	Nandamuri Balakrishna, Vijayashanti	Romance		
Pratighatana	T. Krishna	Vijayshanti, Chandra Mohan	Action		
Preminchu Pelladu	Vamsy	Rajendra Prasad, Bhanupriya, Thulasi	Comedy	Ilaiyaraaja	
Puli	Raj Bharat	Chiranjeevi, Radha	Action		
Ragile Gundelu	A. Kodandarami Reddy	Mohan Babu, Radhika, Prabha		K. Chakravarthy	
Rakta Sindhuram	A. Kodandarami Reddy	Chiranjeevi, Radha		K. Chakravarthy	
Siksha	Relangi Narasimha Rao	Suhasini, Sarath Babu, Chandra Mohan		K. V. Mahadevan	
Sravanthi	Kranthi Kumar	Mohan, Suhasini Maniratnam, Sarath Babu	Romance		
Sri Datta Darsanam	Kamalakara Kameshwara Rao	Sarundaman D. Banerjee	Biographical		
Srivari Shobanam	Jandhyala	Naresh, Anitha Reddy		Ramesh Naidu	
Surya Chandra	Vijaya Nirmala	Krishna, Jaya Prada, Prabha	Action		
Tirugubatu	Dasari Narayana Rao	Krishnam Raju, Jayasudha	Drama		
Vajrayudham	K. Raghavendra Rao	Krishna, Sridevi	Action	K. Chakravarthy	
Vande Mataram	T. Krishna	Rajasekhar, Vijayashanti		K. Chakravarthy	
Vijetha	A. Kodandarami Reddy	Chiranjeevi, Bhanupriya	Drama	K. Chakravarthy	
Yuvataram Pilicindi	P. Bharatiraja				
