= K. S. Rama Rao =

Indian film producer

- Born: Vijayawada, India
- Occupation: Film producer

K. S. Rama Rao (7 July) is an Indian film producer known for his work in Telugu cinema. He founded the production company Creative Commercials in 1973, initially as a radio advertising business, before transitioning to film production in 1983. Rama Rao has produced several notable films, including Abhilasha (1983), Challenge (1984), Rakshasudu (1986), Chanti (1992), Matru Devo Bhava (1993), Criminal (1994), Vasu (2002), and Bujjigadu (2008).

== Early life ==
K. S. Rama Rao was born and brought up in Vijayawada, India, where his father was the owner of a textile business. As a child, Rama Rao would go to the nearby theatres to enjoy the films of the day. Vijayawada was a hub for the film industry, and many of his friends were sons of theatre owners, enabling him to see films for free. He initially aspired to become a movie photographer, but after facing initial setbacks, he shifted to the production side of filmmaking.

== Career ==
=== Early career ===
At the age of 21, Rama Rao moved to Madras with the aspiration of becoming a director. His career in films began when K. Raghavendra Rao introduced him to his father, K. S. Prakash Rao, and he joined their team as a fourth assistant for the film Bandipotu Dongalu (1969), starring Akkineni Nageswara Rao and S. V. Ranga Rao. He later worked on other films, including Vichitra Kutumbam (1969) and Naa Tammudu (1971). However, during the production of Vamsoddarakudu (1972), he had to return to Vijayawada due to his father's illness, leading him to temporarily step away from filmmaking. During this time, he also became involved in the Jai Andhra movement.

=== Formation of Creative Commercials ===
In 1973, Rama Rao founded Creative Commercials as a radio advertising company with the help of his friends like Vadde Ramesh. The company stood out with its English name in an industry dominated by traditional Indian names. The company initially focused on radio campaigns and quickly became successful, handling notable films such as Alluri Seetharama Raju (1974), Jeevana Jyothi (1975), Muthyala Muggu (1975), and Vetagadu (1979).

=== Transition to film production ===
Later, Rama Rao expanded into dubbing Tamil films into Telugu, releasing successful dubbed films like Erra Gulabilu (1978), Mouna Geetham (1980), and Tik Tik Tik (1981). Tik Tik Tik faced controversy due to the use of provocative stills in its promotional material, which sparked protests from women's organizations. Despite the negative attention, the film became a box office success.

An avid reader, Rama Rao was deeply influenced by Telugu literature, particularly the works of Yandamuri Veerendranath. He initially approached Yandamuri to adapt his novel Tulasi Dalam but was eventually captivated by Yandamuri's unpublished novel Abhilasha, which dealt with the theme of capital punishment. This marked Rama Rao's debut as a film producer, and Abhilasha was released in March 1983, becoming a major commercial success. Rama Rao formed a strong team for Abhilasha, including lead actor Chiranjeevi, writer Yandamuri Veerendranath, director A. Kodandarami Reddy, music composer Ilaiyaraaja, cinematographer Lok Singh, and dialogue writer Satyanand.

The collaboration with Chiranjeevi led to a series of successful films, including Challenge (1984) and Rakshasudu (1986). K. S. Rama Rao is credited with coining the title "Mega Star" for Chiranjeevi. While working on the film Marana Mrudangam, Rama Rao coined the title "Mega Star" for Chiranjeevi, which became synonymous with the actor's persona. Before this, Chiranjeevi had been referred to as "Dynamic Hero" and "Supreme Hero."

=== Other banners ===
Apart from Creative Commercials, Rama Rao also produced films under different banners, including Pramoda (named after his wife), under which he produced films like Punya Sthri (1986), Mutyamantha Muddu (1989), and Matrudevobhava (1993), which were commercial hits. He also presented films like Swarnakamalam (1988) and Rowdyism Nasinchali (1990) which were produced by his friend C. H. V. Appa Rao.

=== Later career ===
In the 2000s, Rama Rao began grooming his son, Alexander Vallabha, to take over Creative Commercials. He continued to produce films and was involved in both big-budget and small-budget projects.

== Personal life ==
K. S. Rama Rao has a son named K. A. Vallabha, who was introduced to the film industry through the film Evare... Athagadu! (2003). Later, Vallabha transitioned to production and began managing Creative Commercials banner.

== Filmography ==
=== Producer ===
- Abhilasha (1983)
- Challenge (1984)
- Rakshasudu (1986)
- Marana Mrudangam (1988)
- Stuartpuram Police Station (1991)
- Chanti (1992)
- Babai Hotel (1992)
- Konguchatu Krishnudu (1993)
- Mathru Devo Bhava (1993)
- Angarakshakudu (1994)
- Boyfriend (1994)
- Criminal (1994)
- Hello I Love You (1997)
- Vasu (2002)
- Veera Kannadiga (2004) (Note: Kannada film)
- Bujjigadu (2008)
- Tej I Love You (2018)

=== Presenter ===
- Punya Stree (1986)
- Swarnakamalam (1988)
- Mutyamantha Muddu (1989)
- Aarthanadham (1989)
- Rowdyism Nasinchali (1990)
- Agnipravesam (1990)
- Dr. Ambedkar (1992) (Note: Executive producer)
- Veede (2003)
- A film by Aravind (2005)
- Chukkallo Chandrudu (2006)
- Dammu (2012)
- Love You Bangaram (2014)
- Ulavacharu Biryani (2014)
- Malli Malli Idi Rani Roju (2015)
- Shankara (2016)
- Kousalya Krishnamurthy (2019)
- World Famous Lover (2020)
