= Creative Commercials =

Indian film production house

- Company type: Film and Television Production
- Industry: Entertainment
- Founded: 1973
- Headquarters: Jubilee Hills, Hyderabad, India
- Key people: K. S. Rama Rao
- Products: Films
- Owner: K. S. Rama Rao

Creative Commercials is an Indian film production company established by K. S. Rama Rao.

== History ==
The company was started by K. S. Rama Rao in 1973 as a radio publicity company with the help of his friends Vadde Ramesh (producer), Rangachari (Lakshmi Films) and Chanti Babu (Vijaya Pictures).

== Film production ==
Year	Film	Cast	Director	Notes
1983	Abhilasha	Chiranjeevi, Radhika	A. Kodandarami Reddy	
1984	Challenge	Chiranjeevi, Suhasini Mani Ratnam, Vijayashanti	A. Kodandarami Reddy	
1986	Rakshasudu	Chiranjeevi, Suhasini Mani Ratnam, Radha	A. Kodandarami Reddy	
1988	Marana Mrudangam	Chiranjeevi, Suhasini Mani Ratnam, Radha	A. Kodandarami Reddy	
1989	Mutyamantha Muddu	Rajendra Prasad, Seetha	Ravi Raja Pinisetty	
1991	Stuartpuram Police Station	Chiranjeevi, Vijayashanti, Nirosha	Yandamuri Veerendranath	
1992	Babai Hotel	Brahmanandam, Gundu Hanumantha Rao, Kinnera	Jandhyala	
1992	Chanti	Venkatesh, Meena	Ravi Raja Pinisetty	
1993	Konguchatu Krishnudu	Naresh, Meena	Pamarthi Govind Rao	
1993	Mathru Devo Bhava	Madhavi, Nassar	K. Ajayakumar	
1994	Angarakshakudu	Rajasekhar, Meena	Joshi	
1995	Criminal	Nagarjuna, Ramya Krishnan, Manisha Koirala	Mahesh Bhatt	
2002	Vasu	Venkatesh, Bhoomika Chawla	A. Karunakaran	
2006	Chukkallo Chandrudu	Akkineni Nageswara Rao, Siddharth Narayan, Sadha, Saloni Aswani, Charmme Kaur	Siva Ananth	
2008	Bujjigadu	Mohan Babu, Prabhas, Trisha Krishnan, Sanjjanaa	Puri Jagannadh	
2012	Dammu	NTR Jr, Trisha Krishnan, Karthika Nair	Boyapati Srinu	
2014	Love You Bangaram	Rahul Haridas, Shravya	Govi	Co-Production With Maruthi Talkies
2014	Ulavucharu Biriyani	Prakash Raj, Sneha	Prakash Raj	
2015	Malli Malli Idi Rani Roju	Sharwanand, Nithya Menen	Kranthi Madhav	
2018	Tej I Love You	Sai Dharam Tej, Anupama Parameswaran	A. Karunakaran	
2019	Kousalya Krishnamurthy	Aishwarya Rajesh, Rajendra Prasad	Bhimaneni Srinivasa Rao	
2020	World Famous Lover	Vijay Deverakonda, Raashi Khanna, Aishwarya Rajesh, Izabelle Leite	Kranthi Madhav	
2023	Bhola Shankar	Chiranjeevi, Tamannaah, Keerthi Suresh	Meher Ramesh	

== Awards ==
Ceremony	Year	Category	Nominee	Result
Filmfare Awards South	1993	Filmfare Award for Best Film – Telugu	Mathru Devo Bhava	Won
Nandi Awards	1993	Nandi Award for Best Feature Film (Bronze)	Mathru Devo Bhava	Won
Nandi Awards	2002	Best Home-viewing Feature Film	Vasu	Won
