= Lok Singh =

Indian cinematographer

Lok Singh was an Indian cinematographer who primarily worked in Telugu movies mostly in the 80s and 90s. He worked for over 31 movies with Chiranjeevi. He was mostly known for his collaborations with K. Vishwanath, A. Kodandarami Reddy, and Vijaya Bapineedu.

He died in an accident, caused by a fire, on the sets of Telugu movie Warning, produced by Anuradha Films division chadalavada tirupathi rao in 1996.

== Filmography ==
Name	Year	Director
Nyayam Kavali	1981	A. Kodandarami Reddy
Kirayi Rowdylu	1981	A. Kodandarami Reddy
Subhalekha	1982	K. Viswanath
Abhilasha	1983	A. Kodandarami Reddy
Mantri Gari Viyyankudu	1983	Bapu
Goonda	1984	A. Kodandarami Reddy
Hero	1984	Vijaya Bapineedu
Challenge	1984	A. Kodandarami Reddy
Rustum	1984	A. Kodandarami Reddy
Rakta Sindhuram	1985	A. Kodandarami Reddy
Vijetha	1985	A. Kodandarami Reddy
Kirathakudu	1986	A. Kodandarami Reddy
Chantabbai	1986	Jandhyala
Rakshasudu	1986	A. Kodandarami Reddy
Oka Radha Iddaru Krishnulu	1986	A. Kodandarami Reddy
Donga Mogudu	1987	A. Kodandarami Reddy
Pasivadi Pranam	1987	A. Kodandarami Reddy
Swayamkrushi	1987	K. Viswanath
Chakravarthy	1987	Ravi Raja Pinisetty
Jebu Donga	1987	A. Kodandarami Reddy
Khaidi No. 786	1988	Vijaya Bapineedu
Swarnakamalam	1988	K. Viswanath
Marana Mrudangam	1988	A. Kodandarami Reddy
Trinetrudu	1988	A. Kodandarami Reddy
Attaku Yamudu Ammayiki Mogudu	1989	A. Kodandarami Reddy
Lankeswarudu	1989	Dasari Narayana Rao
Muthyamantha Muddu	1989	Ravi Raja Pinisetty
Abhimanyu	1990	Ravi Raja Pinisetty
Raja Vikramarka	1990	Ravi Raja Pinisetty
Stuartpuram Police Station	1991	Yandamuri Veerendranath
Gang Leader	1991	Vijaya Bapineedu
Vaasthavam	1993	Valmiki
Mechanic Alludu	1993	B. Gopal
Vaddu Bava Thappu	1994	K. Ajay Kumar
Parugo Parugu	1994	Relangi Narasimha Rao
Allarodu	1994	K. Ajay Kumar
Big Boss	1995	Vijaya Bapineedu
