= Raktabhishekam =

1988 Telugu film by A. Kodandarami Reddy

- Theatrical release poster
- Directed by: A. Kodandarami Reddy
- Written by: Jandhyala(dialogues)
- Screenplay by: A. Kodandarami Reddy
- Based on: Raktabhishekam novel by Yandamuri Veerendranath
- Produced by: K. C. Reddy
- Starring: Nandamuri Balakrishna; Radha; Satyanarayana
- Cinematography: N. Sudhakar Reddy
- Edited by: D. Venkataratnam
- Music by: Ilaiyaraaja
- Production company: Sri Rajeev Productions
- Release date: 9 December 1988
- Running time: 125 minutes
- Country: India
- Language: Telugu

Raktabhishekam (transl. Anointing with Blood) is a 1988 Indian Telugu-language action film based on Yandamuri Veerendranath's acclaimed novel of the same title. The film stars Nandamuri Balakrishna as Parthasarathi opposite Radha who enacted the female lead, Aparna. Ilayaraja composed the film's score and soundtrack. The film directed by A. Kodandarami Reddy was released on 9 December 1988. The film was dubbed into Tamil as Rathabhishegam.

== Plot ==
The film begins with a hazardous netherworld Black Tigers who create mayhem in the country led by its deputy chief Black Cheetah Prasad. Anyhow, its chieftain Black Panther is under a veil. Pardhasaradhi, a lionhearted, lives with his father, Constable Narasimham, brother, Inspector Bhargav, sister-in-law Kamala and their daughter, Raaji. Narasimham received a Presidential Award for his integrity when DIG Raj Gopal organized a ceremony in his honor. Whereat, Pardhasaradhi garlands Raj Gopal and assassinates him by removing the revolver from it. Speedily, he flees and reaches his love, Aparna, who surrenders him to the police. Astonishingly, she is the daughter of Raj Gopal, but Pardhasaradhi succeeds in absconding twice. The next day, it is mourning Raj Gopal's fraternity, where GS Rao, a humanitarian afflicted by black tigers, conveys his condolences when Pardhasaradhi abducts Aparna. Bhargav chases him when he seizes the two and spins rearward. Pardhasaradhi spends his life cheerfully; once, he squabbles with Aparna, and they crush.

Meanwhile, black tigers design a bank robbery when Pardhasaradhi catches hold of one whom Bhargav severely interrogates. To slay him, Prasad contacts Narasimham when he uncovers the Blank Panther when they show danger to Raaji to shut him. Following this, they intrigue and eliminate his man on behalf of Bhargav. This day, GS Rao conducts an agitation against the cruelty of Bhargav, and he attempts suicide. So, to guard him, Narasimham takes the blame when Pardhasaradhi pledges to prove his father is not guilty and break out of the mystery of the Black Panther. Accordingly, he brings truth to light with the aid of Aparna and acquits Narasimham. Since Pardhasaradhi turns into a diehard to them, Prasad falsifies with a trap and gets Raj Gopal killed via him. Despite verity, Bhargav decides to apprehend his brother, but Aparna trusts him, and they run off. As it is inevitable, Bhargav announces his father's death to seize Pardhasaradhi. Thus, he is out of hiding together with the black tigers' attack when Narasimham dies. Before leaving breathing, he unwraps that Black Panther is non-else GS Rao. At a stretch, Pardhasaradhi finds the headquarters of the diabolics when they massacre his family. At last, he flares up and razes barbarians. The movie ends with Pardhasaradhi surrendering before the judiciary.

== Cast ==
- Nandamuri Balakrishna as Parthasarathi
- Radha as Aparna
- Satyanarayana as Black panther / GS Rao
- Jaggayya as D.I.G. Raj Gopal
- Sarath Babu as Inspector Bhargava
- Ranganath as Black Cheetah / Prasad
- J. V. Somayajulu as Constable Narasimham
- Vankayala Satyanarayana
- Bhimiswara Rao
- CH Krishna Murthy
- Brahmanandam
- Suthi Velu
- Chitti Babu
- Sangeetha as Kamala
- Sri Lakshmi
- Shobha
- Mamatha as Principal
- Baby Sujitha as Raaji

== Soundtrack ==
Raktabhishekam

Film score by Ilaiyaraaja
- Released: 1988
- Genre: Soundtrack
- Length: 28:52
- Label: Echo Music
- Producer: Ilaiyaraaja

Ilaiyaraaja chronology
Aakhari Poratam (1988)	Raktabhishekam (1988)	Marana Mrudangam (1988)

Music composed by Ilaiyaraaja. Lyrics written by Veturi. Music released on Echo Music Company.

No.	Title	Singer(s)	Length
1.	"Bandaru Chinnadana"	Mano, K. S. Chithra	4:46
2.	"Sari Ganga"	S. P. Balasubrahmanyam, K. S. Chithra	4:22
3.	"Cheye Cheye"	Mano, K. S. Chithra	5:57
4.	"Love Ante"	S. P. Balasubrahmanyam, P. Susheela	4:25
5.	"Kanhare"	K. S. Chithra	4:38
6.	"Jata Kata"	Mano, S. P. Sailaja	4:44
Total length:			28:52
