= Kashmora (1986 film) =

- Theatrical release poster
- Directed by: N. B. Chakravarthy
- Screenplay by: N. B. Chakravarthy
- Based on: Tulasi Dalam by Yandamuri Veerendranath
- Produced by: S. Sudhakar Reddy; K. Sai Mohan Reddy (Presenter)
- Starring: Rajendra Prasad; Rajasekhar; Bhanupriya
- Cinematography: V. S. R. Swamy
- Edited by: D. Venkataratnam
- Music by: Chakravarthy
- Production company: Ushodhaya Movies
- Release date: 4 April 1986
- Running time: 140 minutes
- Country: India
- Language: Telugu

Kashmora is a 1986 Indian Telugu-language horror film directed by N. B. Chakravarthy. Based on the novel Tulasi by Yandamuri Veerendranath, the film features an ensemble cast including Rajendra Prasad, Rajasekhar, Bhanupriya, and Sarath Babu. The music for the film was composed by Chakravarthy.

== Plot ==
The film follows the story of three friends—Sridhar, Jayadev, and Abraka Dhabara—who defeat a powerful sorcerer named Khadra in the remote village of Bista to save Sridhar's sister, Tulasi, from Kashmora's dark magic. In retaliation, the sorcerers' chieftain, Vishachi, creates a formidable new sorcerer, Darkha, to exact vengeance. Darkha vows to kill the three friends, with Tulasi being the only link to locate them within a year of Kashmora's awakening.

Darkha's journey leads him to the city, where a priest mentors him and inspires him to renounce harm toward innocent people. Meanwhile, the families of Sridhar, Jayadev, and Abraka Dhabara maintain cordial relationships, and their children—Dr. Rambabu (Jayadev's son), Shadow (Abraka Dhabara's sibling), and Tulasi—are close friends. A fraudulent saint, Siddheswari, who, upon discovering Darkha's magical abilities, tries to exploit him for her own gain. When Darkha refuses, Siddheswari attempts to sacrifice him, but Tulasi and Shadow intervene and expose her, forcing her to flee.

Darkha eventually identifies Tulasi and learns the whereabouts of the three friends. While seeking revenge, Siddheswari manipulates Rambabu to poison Tulasi gradually. Darkha's first attempt at vengeance results in the accidental death of Sridhar's daughter, Archana, which deeply affects him. He then targets Abraka Dhabara and his wife, Saku, but Saku’s connection to Darkha's priestly mentor protects her. These events lead Darkha to reconsider his actions, and he vows not to harm anyone.

Despite his resolve, Siddheswari captures Darkha again but fails to control him as he escapes and reunites with Shadow. Together, they uncover Siddheswari’s manipulation of Rambabu and work to reverse the effects. As the year ends, Kashmora rises and launches an attack. Darkha struggles to contain the dark forces while Sridhar captures Siddheswari, who reveals Darkha’s efforts to protect Tulasi by drawing a Sri Chakram. However, Sridhar misinterprets Darkha's actions and drives him away.

In the climactic battle, Vishachi lures Tulasi to a burial ground, where Darkha fights to protect her. Ultimately, Darkha sacrifices his soul to defeat Kashmora and destroy Vishachi. In the end, Sridhar kills Vishachi, and Darkha dies, proclaiming that even a sorcerer can possess a good soul.

== Cast ==
- Rajendra Prasad as Darkha
- Rajasekhar as Rambabu
- Bhanupriya as Thulasi
- Sarath Babu as Sridhar
- Nutan Prasad as Abraka Dabra
- Subhalekha Sudhakar as Shadow
- Sridhar as Jayadev
- Rajanala as Vishachi
- Rallapalli as Santana Pakir
- P. J. Sarma as Priest
- Bhimaraju as Khadra
- Juttu Narasimham as Paidithalli
- Jayachitra as Siddheswari Devi
- Sangeeta as Sarada
- Rajyalakshmi as Poornima
- Roja Ramani in a special appearance
- Anitha as Saku
- Nirmalamma as Thulasi's Bamma
- Baby Seeta as Archana

== Music ==
The music was composed by Chakravarthy. The lyrics were written by Veturi.

| Song title | Singers | length |
|---|---|---|
| "Thaaralaa Dhruva Thaaralaa" | P. Suseela | 3:32 |
| "Kaalam Chali Kaalam" | S. P. Balasubrahmanyam, P. Suseela | 4:14 |
| "Jatha Naagulam" | S. P. Balasubrahmanyam, P. Suseela | 3:30 |
| "Rama Bhata Hai Hanuma" | S. P. Balasubrahmanyam, S. P. Sailaja | 5:00 |
| "Thaaralaa Dhruva Thaaralaa" (Pathos) | P. Suseela | 1:49 |
