= Aakhari Poratam =

- Theatrical release poster
- Directed by: K. Raghavendra Rao
- Written by: Jandhyala (dialogues)
- Screenplay by: K. Raghavendra Rao
- Story by: Yandamuri Veerendranath
- Produced by: C. Aswini Dutt
- Starring: Nagarjuna; Sridevi; Suhasini
- Cinematography: K. S. Prakash
- Edited by: Kotagiri Venkateswara Rao
- Music by: Ilaiyaraaja
- Production company: Vyjayanthi Movies
- Release date: 12 March 1988
- Running time: 145 minutes
- Country: India
- Language: Telugu

Aakhari Poratam (transl. Final Battle) is a 1988 Indian Telugu-language romantic action film written and directed by K. Raghavendra Rao based on the novel of the same name by Yandamuri Veerendranath. Produced by C. Aswini Dutt, it starred Nagarjuna, Sridevi and Suhasini with music composed by Ilaiyaraaja. It was featured at the 12th IFFI Indian panorama mainstream section, and turned out to be a box office hit.

== Plot ==
CBI Deputy Chief Pravallika is on a mission to apprehend a Mafia don disguised as religious leader Anantananda Swamy. Swamy is involved in criminal activities such as illegal drug trade, extortion, and arms trafficking. Singer and performer Vihari helps Pravallika in this Covert operation. Pravallika accomplishes the mission and dies in the final battle between the Police and Swamy's Gang.

== Cast ==
- Nagarjuna as Vihari
- Sridevi as Pravallika Deputy Chief of CBI
- Suhasini as Sunadha Mala
- Chandra Mohan as Padmakar
- Amrish Puri as Anantananda Swamy
- Satyanarayana as Parameswaram
- Jaggayya as Pratap Rao
- Nutan Prasad as Surya Rao
- Pradeep Shakthi
- Suthi Velu
- P. J. Sarma as Dr. Murthy
- Peketi Sivaram as CBI Chief
- Jayanthi as Vardhani
- Mamatha
- Nirmalamma
- Master Rajesh as Swamy

== Soundtrack ==
Aakhari Poratam

Film score by Ilaiyaraaja
- Released: 1988
- Genre: Soundtrack
- Length: 24:27
- Label: Aditya Music
- Producer: Ilaiyaraaja

Ilaiyaraaja chronology
Maharshi (1988)	Aakhari Poratam (1988)	Marana Mrudangam (1988)

Songs were composed by Ilaiyaraaja. Music released on ECHO Music Company. Here, singer K. S. Chitra does her debut song Abha Deeni Sooku in Telugu.

No.	Title	Lyrics	Singer(s)	Length
1.	"Thella Cheeraku"	Veturi	S. P. Balasubrahmanyam, Lata Mangeshkar	4:46
2.	"Swathi Chinuku"	Veturi	S. P. Balasubrahmanyam, S. Janaki	5:33
3.	"Gundelo Thakita"	Jonnavittula	S. P. Balasubrahmanyam, K. S. Chithra	4:40
4.	"Abba Deenisoku"	Veturi	S. P. Balasubrahmanyam, K. S. Chithra	4:43
5.	"Eppudu Eppudu"	Veturi	S. P. Balasubrahmanyam, K. S. Chithra	4:38
Total length:				24:27
