= Abhilasha (1983 film) =

1983 film by A. Kodandarami Reddy

- Theatrical release poster
- Directed by: A. Kodandarami Reddy
- Based on: Abhilasha by Yandamuri Veerendranath
- Produced by: K. S. Rama Rao
- Starring: Chiranjeevi; Radhika; Rao Gopal Rao
- Cinematography: Lok Singh
- Edited by: Kotagiri Venkateswara Rao
- Music by: Ilaiyaraaja
- Production company: Creative Commercials
- Distributed by: Creative Commercials
- Release date: 11 March 1983
- Running time: 145 minutes
- Country: India
- Language: Telugu
- Budget: ₹16.5 lakh

Abhilasha (transl. Desire) is a 1983 Indian Telugu-language legal drama film directed by A. Kodandarami Reddy and produced by K. S. Rama Rao. The film stars Chiranjeevi and Radhika while Rao Gopal Rao and Gollapudi Maruti Rao play vital roles and the music is composed by Ilaiyaraaja.

An adaptation of Yandamuri Veerendranath's novel of the same name, it revolves around a young lawyer striving to end capital punishment in India, but gets entangled in a murder case. The film released theatrically on 11 March 1983 to positive response and was a commercial success. It was remade in Tamil as Sattathai Thiruthungal (1984). In spite of being an adaptation of a novel, the core plot was observed to be similar to two American films—The Man Who Dared (1946) and Beyond A Reasonable Doubt (1956).

== Plot ==
Struggling lawyer Chiranjeevi (Chiranjeevi) lives with his roommate (Allu Aravind) and is determined to abolish Section 302 of the Indian Penal Code, which mandates the death penalty for murder. His motivation stems from his father's wrongful execution for a crime he didn't commit.

Sarvothama Rao (Rao Gopal Rao), a renowned criminal lawyer, invites all the famous lawyers in the city to a party. By mistake, Chiranjeevi receives an invitation and seizes the opportunity to meet Sarvothama Rao. Nervous but resolute, he plans to discuss his proposal to repeal Section 302.

At the party, Chiranjeevi inadvertently drinks too much and ends up in an embarrassing situation, seeking refuge in a restroom. There, he accidentally meets Sarvothama Rao's niece, Archana (Radhika), and awkwardly explains his presence. This encounter leads to a blossoming romance between Chiranjeevi and Archana, who soon has to leave for a meeting abroad.

During her absence, Chiranjeevi devises a plan to fake a murder, implicate himself, and receive a death sentence. He hopes that Sarvothama Rao will reveal the truth at the last moment to the governor, thereby challenging Section 302 in the Supreme Court. They successfully frame Chiranjeevi with the body of a woman, leading to his death sentence. While in jail, guard Vishnu Sharma (Rallapalli) is puzzled by Chiranjeevi's calm demeanor.

Upon her return, Archana learns of Chiranjeevi's impending execution and visits him. Chiranjeevi, keeping his plan secret, pretends to have committed the crime out of lust, leaving Archana heartbroken. Meanwhile, Sarvothama Rao, en route to meet the governor, has an accident, jeopardizing the plan.

A desperate Chiranjeevi confides in Vishnu Sharma, who rushes to inform Archana. After a frantic night, they manage to contact Sarvothama Rao, who, though injured, provides the evidence needed to save Chiranjeevi.

To celebrate, Sarvothama Rao throws a party, announcing Chiranjeevi and Archana's engagement. However, a drunk Obulesu (Gollapudi Maruti Rao) pulls Chiranjeevi aside, arousing Archana's suspicion. She follows them, leading to the revelation that the woman whose corpse was used in the fake murder did not die naturally. The postmortem report shows she was killed by a man with four fingers on one hand. Archana remembers a four-fingered goon who attacked her previously, and Chiranjeevi recalls buying the body from this goon.

The investigation uncovers that the dead woman was Sarvothama Rao's daughter from an extramarital affair. Sarvothama Rao is arrested, and in court, the judge sentences him to death. Chiranjeevi objects, arguing that true punishment should involve suffering for one's actions, not death. The judge agrees, reducing Sarvothama Rao's sentence to seven years in prison.

== Cast ==
- Chiranjeevi as Chiranjeevi
- Radhika as Archana
- Rao Gopal Rao as Sarvothama Rao
- Rallapalli as Vishnu Sarma
- Gollapudi Maruthi Rao as Obulesu
- Rajyalakshmi as Sarvothama Rao's daughter
- Bheema Raju as Bheema Raju
- Mada Venkateswara Rao
- Uyyuru Ramakrishna
- C. S. Rao
- Satyendra Kumar
- P. J. Sarma
- Vijayaram
- Krishna Chaitanya
- Dham
- K. L. N. Rao
- Mallikarjuna Rao
- G. Murthy
- M. Jagadeesh Babu

== Production ==
K. S. Rama Rao, who founded Creative Commercials as a radio advertising business, later expanded into the film industry. His first foray into filmmaking involved acquiring the dubbing rights of successful Tamil films and releasing them in Telugu. His passion for literature inspired his transition to film production.

In the early 1980s, Rama Rao sought the rights to adapt Yandamuri Veerendranath's novel Tulasi Dalam. Instead, Veerendranath introduced Rama Rao to his unpublished novel Abhilasha, which explores the theme of capital punishment. Captivated by the story, Rama Rao secured the rights and decided to produce it as his first film. The novel itself was observed to be similar to two American films—The Man Who Dared (1946) and Beyond A Reasonable Doubt (1956).

For the adaptation of Abhilasha, Rama Rao assembled a distinguished team. He approached Chiranjeevi to play the lead. Chiranjeevi accepted the film immediately after his mother had previously recommended the novel to him based on its serialized publication in a magazine. A. Kodandarami Reddy was chosen as the director, and Ilaiyaraaja was brought on as the composer. Veerendranath, along with Satyanand and Satyamurthy, adapted the novel into the screenplay. This collaboration of Chiranjeevi, K. S. Rama Rao, Kodandarami Reddy, Yandamuri Veerendranath and Ilaiyaraaja proved highly successful and led to a series of hit films in the 1980s, including Challenge (1984) and Rakshasudu (1986).

== Music ==
All songs were composed by Ilaiyaraaja.

No.	Title	Lyrics	Singer(s)	Length
1.	"Navvindi Malle Chendu"	Veturi	S. P. Balasubrahmanyam & S. Janaki	4:17
2.	"Urakalai Godavari"	Acharya Aatreya	S. P. Balasubrahmanyam & S. Janaki	4:43
3.	"Sande Poddula Kada"	Veturi	S. P. Balasubrahmanyam & S. Janaki	4:28
4.	"Banthee Chamanthi"	Veturi	S. P. Balasubrahmanyam & S. Janaki	4:40
5.	"Vela Pala Ledu"	Acharya Aatreya	S. P. Balasubrahmanyam & S. Janaki	4:39

== Reception ==
Venkat Rao of Andhra Patrika, writing his review on 18 March 1983, praised the film for screenplay, direction and performances of the lead cast. "Chiranjeevi has breath life into his character, its not an exaggeration to say the he would reach greater heights in terms of acting," he opined. The reviewer also wrote "Introducing songs in the films of such genre may affect the screenplay, Ilaiyaraaja's soundtrack however would be appealing to the youth."

The film initially received negative feedback during its premier at Madras. Director Reddy and writer Yendamuri who were in Hyderabad that time, worried about their film career which was dependent on Abhilasha's success.

However, upon release, the film received a positive response from all areas and became a commercial success. Director Reddy opined that the film's success boosted the careers of the cast and crew.

== Bibliography ==
- Rajadhyaksha, Ashish; Willemen, Paul (1998) [1994]. Encyclopaedia of Indian Cinema (PDF). British Film Institute and Oxford University Press. ISBN 0-19-563579-5.
