= Jagan (film) =

1984 Telugu action film directed by Narayana Rao Dasari

- Directed by: Dasari Narayana Rao
- Written by: Dasari Narayana Rao (Story, screenplay & dialogues)
- Produced by: Vajjala Subba Rao; Vijaya Shankar
- Starring: Sobhan Babu; Jayasudha; Sumalatha
- Cinematography: K. S. Hari
- Edited by: V. Krishnam Raju
- Music by: Chakravarthy
- Production company: Lalithalaya Movies
- Release date: 10 March 1984
- Country: India
- Language: Telugu

Jagan is a 1984 Indian Telugu-language action film written and directed by Dasari Narayana Rao, produced by Vajjala Subba Rao and Vijaya Shankar under the banner of Lalithalaya Movies, starring Sobhan Babu, Jayasudha, Sumalatha and Jaggayya. The film was a box office bomb.

== Cast ==
- Sobhan Babu as Sobhan and Jagan
- Jayasudha as Lalitha
- Sumalatha as Jagan's wife
- Jaggayya as Dharmamurthy
- Gollapudi Maruti Rao as Maruti Rao
- Allu Ramalingaiah as Ramalingam
- Mallikarjuna Rao as member of Maruti Rao's party
- Peketi Sivaram as Shankaram
- Y. G. Mahendran as Mahendra
- Nirmalamma as Maruti Rao's sister
- Chalapathi Rao as Jailor
- Jayamalini
- P.J. Sarma as Judge
- Satyanarayana
- Gokina Rama Rao
- Dr. Radha Krishna
- K. R. Savitri
- Vijaya Lalitha

== Soundtrack ==
Soundtrack was composed by Chakravarthy.

Jagan

Soundtrack album by Chakravarthy
- Released: 1984
- Genre: Feature film soundtrack

Title	Singer(s)	Length
"Adi Oka Ratri"	Mano	4:37
"Shaana Ala"	Mano	4:22
"Raaka Raaka"	Mano	4:21
"Adagande"	Mano	4:38
"Thummeda"	Mano	4:38
