= Muthyamantha Muddu =

- Movie Poster
- Directed by: Ravi Raja Pinisetty
- Written by: G. Satya Murthy (dialogues)
- Screenplay by: Ravi Raja Pinisetty
- Story by: Yandamuri Veerendranath
- Based on: Thiller (Novel)
- Produced by: K. Benarjee
- Starring: Rajendra Prasad; Seetha
- Cinematography: Lok Singh
- Edited by: Velle Swamy
- Music by: Hamsalekha
- Production company: Pramoda Art Films
- Release date: 1989
- Running time: 136 Mins
- Country: India
- Language: Telugu

Muthyamantha Muddu (transl. Pearl Size Kiss) is a 1989 Telugu-language thriller film produced by K. Benarjee under the Pramoda Art Films banner, Presented by K. S. Rama Rao and directed by Ravi Raja Pinisetty. It stars Rajendra Prasad and Seetha, with music composed by Hamsalekha. The film is based on Yandamuri Veerendranath novel Thriller. Hamsalekha used the tune of two songs from two different Kannada movies in this movie.

The story is about Anudeep, a man who spends seven years doing intense penance (tapasya) in the Vindhya Hills to understand the true meaning of love. Through his devotion, he gains extraordinary spiritual powers.

The heroine, Vidyadhari, hates men because almost every man around her behaves badly. Her landlord, Professor Ranganatham, his son Rama Rao, and her boss Chakradhar constantly harass or flirt with her. When she rejects Chakradhar’s repeated proposals, he falsely accuses her of stealing a valuable bed, ruining her reputation.

At this difficult time, Anudeep suddenly enters her life. He speaks as if he already knows everything about her. He confidently takes her to confront Chakradhar. Using his mysterious powers, he forces Chakradhar to bow at Vidyadhari’s feet and apologize. Shocked, Vidyadhari asks Anudeep what he does for a living. He simply replies, “I love.”

From then on, Anudeep keeps protecting Vidyadhari from every danger. However, his strange behavior confuses her. Finally, he reveals that he has loved her for seven years and that his penance was done only for her. He says his devotion gave him supernatural abilities.

Vidyadhari refuses to believe him and thinks he is just another man pretending to be good. To prove that his love is pure and supernatural, Anudeep tells her to lock her house tightly one night. The next morning, she finds a love mark on her body even though no one entered the house. Furious, she accuses him of violating her trust. Instead of arguing, Anudeep promises to punish himself.

Later, in a movie theatre, Vidyadhari is horrified to see Anudeep cutting off his own hand as punishment. The police arrest him. During interrogation, the officer sarcastically challenges him to grow his hand back. Miraculously, Anudeep regenerates his hand before everyone’s eyes and calmly walks away, leaving everyone speechless.

Police Commissioner Dharma Rao believes Anudeep is only fooling people with clever tricks. However, SP Ravi Sastry investigates further. After visiting the Vindhya Hills, he realizes that Anudeep’s penance and spiritual powers are real.

Meanwhile, Vidyadhari’s attractive friend Vaishali makes a bet that she can seduce Anudeep. She invites him to her room, but instead of seeing her with desire, Anudeep sees her with the pure affection of a mother. Ashamed of herself, Vaishali apologizes and bows before him.

At the same time, the police suspect Chakradhar of planning a large financial fraud. Commissioner Dharma Rao asks Vidyadhari to secretly collect evidence against him. Anudeep warns her not to get involved because great danger is waiting for her, but she ignores his warning.

That night, Vidyadhari goes to Chakradhar’s house while SI Viswanatham is supposed to protect her. Instead, Viswanatham betrays everyone and joins Chakradhar’s partner Sampath. Together they murder Chakradhar and frame Vidyadhari for the crime.

Vidyadhari is arrested and sent to prison. She blames Anudeep for everything that has happened. However, SP Ravi Sastry uncovers the truth with Anudeep’s help and proves that Vidyadhari is innocent, leading to her release.

Later, Vidyadhari remembers an important clue that could identify the real criminals. When Viswanatham and Sampath discover this, they decide to kill her. Anudeep saves her once again but is fatally wounded in the process.

While Anudeep is in the hospital, Ravi Sastry finally tells Vidyadhari the whole truth. He explains that Anudeep’s penance, powers, and selfless love were all genuine and that he had been protecting her all along without expecting anything in return.

Vidyadhari finally realizes the depth and purity of Anudeep’s love. She rushes to the hospital to confess her feelings, but she arrives too late. Anudeep dies.

In the end, although Anudeep’s body is gone, his soul is united with Vidyadhari’s love, showing that true love is eternal and goes beyond death.

== Cast ==
- Rajendra Prasad as Anudeep
- Seetha as Vidyadhari
- Gollapudi Maruti Rao as Prof. Ranganatham
- Murali Mohan as Ravi Sastry
- Sudhakar as Chakradhar
- Brahmanandam as S. I. Viswanatham
- Ali as Rikshawala
- Ranganath as Commissioner Dharma Rao
- Prasad Babu as Sampath
- G. V. Narayana Rao as Rama Rao
- Kanta Rao as Anudeep's father
- Dham as Priest
- Annapurna as Anudeep's mother
- Divyavani as Vishali
- Raasi as Young Vidyadhari

== Soundtrack ==
Muthyamantha Muddu

Film score by Hamsalekha
- Released: 1989
- Genre: Soundtrack
- Length: 18:31
- Label: Lahari Music
- Producer: Hamsalekha

Hamsalekha chronology
Agni (1989)	Muthyamantha Muddu (1989)	Aarthanadham (1989)

Music composed by Hamsalekha. Lyrics were written by Veturi. Music released on Lahari Music Company.

Hamsalekha used the tune of two songs from two different Kannada movies starring Ravichandran in this movie. The song Premalekha Raasa was the reused version of the song Aakaradalli Gulabi Rangide from the 1988 Kannada movie Anjada Gandu. The song Ichcohuko was the reused version of the song Yaavudo Ee Bombe with a tune in between taken from the tune of the line Neenenayya Maayagaaranu from another song Sri Krishna Bandanu - both from the 1989 Kannada movie Yuga Purusha.

S. No.	Song title	Singers	length
1	"Premalekha Raasa"	S. P. Balasubrahmanyam, S. Janaki	4:47
2	"Goppinti Gopamma"	S. P. Balasubrahmanyam	4:24
3	"O Andama"	S. P. Balasubrahmanyam	4:33
4	"Ichcohuko"	S. P. Balasubrahmanyam, S. Janaki	4:32

== Awards ==
- Seetha won Nandi Special Jury Award
