= Oka Radha Iddaru Krishnulu =

- Theatrical release poster
- Directed by: A. Kodandarami Reddy
- Written by: Satyanand (dialogues)
- Screenplay by: A. Kodandarami Reddy
- Story by: Yandamuri Veerendranath
- Starring: Kamal Haasan; Sridevi
- Cinematography: Lok Singh
- Edited by: D. Venkataratnam
- Music by: Ilaiyaraaja
- Production company: Sri Sarasa Movies
- Distributed by: Raaj Kamal Films International (Tamil version)
- Release date: 2 October 1986
- Running time: 139 mins
- Country: India
- Language: Telugu

Oka Radha Iddaru Krishnulu (transl. One Radha, two Krishnas) is a 1986 Indian Telugu-language comedy film directed by A. Kodandarami Reddy. The film stars Kamal Haasan and Sridevi, with music composed by Ilaiyaraaja. It is adapted from the novel of the same name by Yandamoori Veerendranath.

Released on 2 October 1986, Oka Radha Iddaru Krishnulu premiered alongside another film by Kodandarami Reddy, Rakshasudu.

== Cast ==
- Kamal Haasan as Murali Krishna / Hari Krishna
- Sridevi as Radha
- Rao Gopal Rao as Narasimham
- Satyanarayana as Satyam / Jango
- Rajendra Prasad as Prasad
- Nutan Prasad as Inspector Koteswara Rao
- Suthi Veerabhadra Rao as Anjneelu
- Rajeev as Raja
- Ramana Murthy as Narayana Rao
- P. J. Sarma as Jailor
- Bhemiswara Rao as Principal
- Telephone Satyanarayana
- KK Sarma as Hostel Warden
- Chidatala Appa Rao as Barber Appa Rao
- Dham
- Annapurna as Parvathi
- Jayamalini as item number
- Samyukta
- Bindu Ghosh as Andallamma
- Chilakala Radha as Servant
- Kalpana Rai as Hostel Warden
- Nirmalamma as Bamma

== Soundtrack ==
The music was composed by Ilaiyaraaja. Lyrics were written by Veturi. Music was released on Echo Audio Company. For the Tamil-dubbed version Hare Radha Hare Krishna, all lyrics were written by Vaali.

Telugu
No.	Title	Singer(s)	Length
1.	"Vey Vey"	Kamal Haasan	4:46
2.	"Madhura Murali"	S. P. Balasubrahmanyam, S. Janaki	4:26
3.	"Pattu Mari"	S. P. Balasubrahmanyam, S. Janaki	4:25
4.	"Danimma"	S. P. Balasubrahmanyam, S. Janaki	4:34
5.	"Eami Tuntari"	S. P. Balasubrahmanyam, S. Janaki	4:32
Total length:			22:43

Tamil
No.	Title	Singer(s)	Length
1.	"Yar Amma"	S. P. Balasubrahmanyam, S. Janaki
2.	"Samakkoli"	S. P. Balasubrahmanyam, S. Janaki
3.	"Paruvamuruka Idhayam"	S. P. Balasubrahmanyam, S. Janaki
4.	"Radha"	S. P. Balasubrahmanyam
5.	"Paaramma"	S. P. Balasubrahmanyam, S. Janaki
6.	"Pachaimani Pavalamani"	S. P. Balasubrahmanyam, S. Janaki
