= Maa Pallelo Gopaludu =

1985 Telugu film directed by Kodi Ramakrishna

- Theatrical poster
- Directed by: Kodi Ramakrishna
- Written by: Ganesh Patro (dialogues)
- Screenplay by: Kodi Ramakrishna
- Produced by: S. Gopal Reddy
- Starring: Arjun; Poornima
- Music by: K. V. Mahadevan
- Production company: Bhargav Art Productions
- Release date: 9 April 1985
- Running time: 117 minutes
- Country: India
- Language: Telugu

Maa Pallelo Gopaludu is a 1985 Telugu-language film directed by Kodi Ramakrishna. The film starred Arjun and Poornima. The film was commercially successful and ran for 367 days. This film marked the Telugu debut of Arjun. Arjun and Kodi Ramakrishna later collaborated for four other films.

== Cast ==
- Arjun as Gopalam
- Poornima
- Raja
- Gollapudi Maruthi Rao
- Chandrika
- Y. Vijaya
- Kalpana Rai
- P. J. Sharma
- Chidatala Apparao
- Juttu Narasimham
- Baby Saraswathi
- S. Varalakshmi
- Ali (child artist)

== Soundtrack ==
Soundtrack was composed by K. V. Mahadevan.

- "Rani Ranamma" - S. P. Balasubrahmanyam, P. Susheela
- "Sariga Sariga" - S. P. Balasubrahmanyam
- "Ko Ko Kothi" - S. P. Balasubrahmanyam
- "Nenu Ele" - S. P. Balasubrahmanyam
- "Kum Kummanthine" - S. P. Balasubrahmanyam
