= Raksha (2008 film) =

- Movie Poster
- Directed by: Vamsikrishna Akella
- Written by: Jeevan Reddy (dialogues)
- Screenplay by: Vamsikrishna Akella
- Based on: Phoonk (2008)
- Produced by: Azam Khan; Ram Gopal Varma (Presents)
- Starring: Jagapati Babu; Kalyani
- Cinematography: Surjodeep Ghosh
- Edited by: Bhanodaya
- Music by: Bappi-Tutul
- Production companies: One More Thought Entertainment; Zed3 Pictures Productions
- Release date: 19 September 2008
- Running time: 116 minutes
- Country: India
- Language: Telugu

Raksha (transl. Protection) is a 2008 Telugu-language horror thriller film directed by Vamsi Krishna Akella. Produced by Azam Khan and presented by Ram Gopal Varma, the film stars Jagapati Babu and Kalyani in the lead roles, with music composed by Bappi-Tutul. It is a remake of Ram Gopal Varma's Phoonk, whose story is thematically similar to the Telugu thriller novel, Tulasi Dalam, by Yandamuri Veerendranath.

== Plot ==
The film begins with Rajeev, owner of Raksha Construction Company, leading a delightful life with his wife, Arthi, and their children, Rahul & Raksha. Moreover, he has immense affection for his daughter Raksha. Venu, the bestie of Rajeev, works in his company with his wife, Madhu, with whom he facilitates all comforts. Rajeev is an atheist, but his wife and mother have immense belief in God and black magic (Chethabadalu). On a regular work day at the construction site, his manager Shyam finds an ancient Ganesh idol. He also advises Rajeev to construct a temple therein; otherwise, it would be a bad omen for them. However, Rajeev takes heads deaf to his words. One day, Rajeev becomes aware of Venu and Madhu as swindlers, his friend Vinay. Then he is rude to them and expels them from his company.

After that, suddenly, on an uneventful day, strange things happen in his house, and Raksha starts behaving unusually. His mother and wife plead to him to overlook this unforeseen circumstance, but he will not listen. But sadly, her health levels start deteriorating. So, he consults a psychiatrist, Dr. Rangarajan, who is tongue-tied and unable to explain the changes happening to Raksha. In that fatal condition, Rajeev starts believing in God and owes to construct the temple on his site. Vinay takes him to a black magician, Baba, and finds out that it is black magic done by Venu & Madhu and with the support of Rajeev's car driver, Mani. Parallelly, a specialist, Dr. Seema, detects it as an obsession that erupted due to the silliness of Rajeevi's mother. At last, Rajeev finds out the whereabouts of Venu & Madhu and destroys the black magic. Simultaneously, Seema makes Raksha normal with hypnotism. The movie ends with a dichotomy of the existence of God and science.

== Cast ==
- Jagapati Babu as Rajeev
- Kalyani as Aarthi
- Baby Neha as Raksha
- Master Athulith as Rahul
- Radha Kumari as Rajeev's mother
- Pradeep Rawat as Baba
- Jayasudha as Dr. Seema
- Subbaraju as Vinay
- Rajiv Kanakala as Venu
- Satya Krishnan as Madhu
- Chatrapathi Sekhar as Mani
- Jeeva as Dr. Rangarajan
- Narsing Yadav as Shyam
- Shankar Melkote as Dr. Pandey
- Bhargavi as Lakshmi
