= Babai Hotel =

- Directed by: Jandhyala
- Written by: Jandhyala
- Story by: Sainath
- Produced by: K. S. Rama Rao
- Starring: Brahmanandam; Kinnera; Gundu Hanumantha Rao
- Cinematography: P. Diwakar
- Edited by: C. Manik Rao
- Music by: Madhavapeddi Suresh
- Production company: Creative Commercials
- Release date: 5 June 1992
- Running time: 118 min
- Country: India
- Language: Telugu

Babai Hotel is a 1992 Telugu-language comedy drama film directed by Jandhyala and produced by K. S. Rama Rao under the banner Creative Commercials. The film stars Brahmanandam, Gundu Hanumantha Rao and Kinnera. This movie was named based on Babai Hotel in Vijayawada.

== Cast ==
- Brahmanandam as Rama Chandra Moorti
- Gundu Hanumantha Rao as Hanumantu
- Kinnera as Chukka
- Suthivelu as Simhachalam
- Kota Srinivasa Rao as Sundaraiah
- Sri Lakshmi as Sundaraiah's wife Rama
- Maathu as Swapna
- Dharmavarapu Subrahmanyam
- Pavala Syamala
- Baby Karuna
- Baby Sreshta
- Gautam Raju
- Kadambari Kiran
- Aalapati Lakshmi
- Master Anil
- Sameera
- Sri Hari Murthy
- Jeedigunta Sridhar
- Vinnakota Vijayaram
- Ananth as thief
