= Mathru Devo Bhava =

- Directed by: K. Ajay Kumar
- Screenplay by: K. Ajay Kumar
- Story by: Dennis Joseph
- Produced by: K. S. Rama Rao
- Starring: Madhavi; Nassar; Y. Vijaya; Charuhasan; Subbaraya Sarma; Sarathi; Maharshi Raghava; Tanikella Bharani; Baby Seena Antony
- Cinematography: Chota K. Naidu
- Music by: M. M. Keeravani
- Production company: Creative Commercials
- Release date: October 22, 1993
- Running time: 140 minutes
- Language: Telugu
- Budget: ₹37 lakhs

Mathru Devo Bhava is a 1993 Telugu drama film written and directed by K. Ajay Kumar and starring Madhavi and Nassar. The film is a remake of the Malayalam film Akashadoothu (1993) by Sibi Malayil.

The film won the National Film Award for Best Lyrics by Veturi for the song "Raalipoye Puvva" and Filmfare Best Film Award (Telugu). The film was dubbed in Tamil as Thaai Ullam, which featured a reshot comedy track. The film won two Nandi Awards.

== Plot ==
Satyam (Nassar) is a driver and his wife Sarada (Madhavi) is a music teacher. They were both orphans brought up in the Seva Ashram (run by Charuhasan). Sarada and Satyam have four kids. Satyam, though good at heart, is addicted to liquor. Apparao (Tanikella Bharani), a toddy milk vendor, has an eye on Sarada. When Satyam discovers Apparao making advances on Sarada, he assaults him in front of everyone. Avenging the assault, Apparao kills Satyam. Sarada, who is diagnosed with cancer, wants her children to be brought up in a family atmosphere rather than in the Ashram and the children are adopted by different families.

== Cast ==
- Madhavi as Sarada
- Nassar as Satyam
- Allu Ramalingaiah
- Kota Srinivasa Rao
- Brahmanandam
- Dharmavarapu Subrahmanyam
- Nirmalamma
- Y. Vijaya as Parvatamma
- Charuhasan as Swami
- Subbaraya Sarma as Ananthaswami
- Sarathi as Suryam as toddy shop owner
- Maharshi Raghava as Doctor
- Tanikella Bharani as Apparao
- Baby Seena Antony as Radha
- Master Martin
- Master Teja P

== Production ==
K.S. Rama Rao saw the film and bought the remake rights for Telugu. Rama Rao brought Madhavi in to reprise her role from Akashadoothu since she was also a familiar face to the Telugu audience. Major portions of the Telugu remake were shot in the same locations as the original film.

In 2008, the movie was remade in Hindi as Tulsi by the same director with Manisha Koirala and Irrfan Khan.

== Soundtrack ==
The music for this film was composed by M. M. Keeravani. This album featured four tracks, which were highly successful. The track "Venuvai Vachanu", sung by K. S. Chithra was a huge chart buster and won a Nandi Award for best playback singer female. That song was composed in Shubhapantuvarali raga. All the lyrics are written by Veturi and he won his first National Film Award for Best Lyrics for the track "Raalipoyye Poova".

Track Listing
No.	Title	Singer(s)	Length
1.	"Raagam Anuragam"	S. P. Balasubrahmanyam & K. S. Chithra	4:36
2.	"Kanneetiki Kaluvalu"	S. P. Balasubrahmanyam	4:17
3.	"Raalipoyye Poovva"	M. M. Keeravani	4:05
4.	"Venuvai Vachhanu"	K. S. Chithra, M. M. Keeravani & Chorus	5:35

== Awards ==
Nandi Awards - 1993

- Third Best Feature Film - Bronze - K. S. Rama Rao
- Best Female Playback Singer - K. S. Chitra
