= Criminal (1994 film) =

1994 Indian film in Telugu and Hindi directed by Mahesh Bhatt

- Film poster (Telugu Version)
- Directed by: Mahesh Bhatt
- Screenplay by: Mahesh Bhatt
- Produced by: K. S. Rama Rao (Telugu); Mukesh Bhatt (Hindi)
- Starring: Nagarjuna; Manisha Koirala; Ramya Krishna
- Cinematography: S. Gopal Reddy
- Edited by: G. G. Krishna Rao (Telugu); Sanjay Sankla (Hindi)
- Music by: M. M. Keeravani (credited as M. M. Kreem in Hindi)
- Production companies: Creative Commercials (Telugu); Vishesh Films (Hindi)
- Distributed by: T-Series Films
- Release dates: 14 October 1994 (Telugu); 4 August 1995 (Hindi)
- Running time: 142 mins
- Country: India
- Languages: Telugu; Hindi

Criminal is a 1994 Indian action thriller film directed by Mahesh Bhatt, starring Nagarjuna, Manisha Koirala, Ramya Krishna. Shot simultaneously in Telugu and Hindi languages.

Produced by K. S. Rama Rao under the Creative Commercials banner in Telugu, and by Mukesh Bhatt under the Vishesh Films banner in Hindi with the music composed by M. M. Keeravani (credited as MM Kreem in Hindi). Criminal was an Indian adaptation to the 1993 American film The Fugitive.

The Telugu version released on 14 October 1994, while the Hindi version released on 4 August 1995. Criminal was the last film of the renowned Hindi film actor Ajit. Malayalam movie Nirnnayam starring Mohanlal is another adaptation of The Fugitive.

== Plot ==
After witnessing the unfortunate death of a woman, who was unable to afford hospital treatment, Dr. Ajay Kumar cancels his planned immigration to the U.S. and instead sets out to develop a plan to open a hospital that will be accessible to people who cannot afford treatment in regular hospitals, called "Amma Hospital". This draws quite a lot of attention, and he becomes popular, especially with two young women, Dr. Swetha and ACP Ramya. He falls in love with Swetha, and both get married, breaking Ramya's heart in the process. Shortly thereafter, much to their delight, Swetha becomes pregnant.

When Swetha discovers a frightening organ-smuggling operation in her hospital while going through a friend's diagnostic report, she calls Ramya. Soon after, Swetha is attacked by a killer and rings the police. Ajay enters their home to find Swetha, who soon succumbs to her injuries. The police arrive to find her dead body and arrest Ajay for murder. They deduce that Ajay's motive for killing Swetha was money, as Swetha was a wealthy heiress. Furthermore, she shouted Ajay's name as she was on the phone with the police. The court finds Ajay guilty, and he is sentenced to death. While being transported to the jail for the sentence to be carried out, the police bus meets with an accident as the other prisoners have staged a riot. Ajay escapes and changes his appearance and the police launch a manhunt for him but are unable to catch him. Ajay goes to Ramya's house to prove his innocence. Meanwhile, he used to know Ramya had a crush on him. He catches the real killer and discovers the man behind everything - including the smuggling, was Ajay's friend Dr. Pratap. Finally, he reopens the hospital and puts garland on Swetha's picture.

== Cast ==
Cast (Telugu)	Cast (Hindi)	Role (Telugu)	Role (Hindi)
Nagarjuna		Dr. Ajay Kumar	Dr. Ajay Kumar
Manisha Koirala		Dr. Swetha	Dr. Swetha
Ramya Krishna		ACP Ramya	ACP Ramya
Gulshan Grover		Rakesh Kumar / Robert	Rakesh Kumar / Robert
Kota Srinivasa Rao	Ajit	Srinivasa Rao	Jagdish Prasad
Satyanarayana	S M Zaheer	Chandrashekhar	Verma
Nassar		SP Teja	SP Teja
Sarath Babu		Dr. Pratap	Dr. Pratap
Sudha	Beena Banerjee	Yashoda	Yashoda
Brahmanandam	Johnny Lever	Chitti Babu	Changu
Gundu Hanumantha Rao	Laxmikant Berde	Tinku	Mangu
—N/a	Shrivallabh Vyas	Advocate	Advocate
Dharmavarapu Subramanyam		Inspector	Inspector
Devadas Kanakala	—N/a	Commissioner	Commissioner
Kota Shankar Rao	—N/a	Lawyer	Lawyer
Visweswara Rao		Servant	Servant
Husain		Prisoner	Prisoner
Jenny		Inspector Nanda Gopal	Inspector Nanda Gopal
Johnny Lever	—N/a	Himself	—N/a
Trishna		item number	item number

== Soundtrack ==
All the music was composed by M. M. Keeravani. The song "Paapki Paapki/Keemti Keemti" is inspired by "Lonely Monday Morning" from 12 Inches of Snow (1993) by the Canadian musician Snow. The track "Thelusa Manasa" (only the humming portion) was inspired from the English album The Cross of Changes (1993) and the song "Age of Loneliness" (1994) both composed by the German band Enigma. K. S. Chithra took four days to practice and replicate the same humming in her style. The song was set in the abheri/bhimpalasi ragas, and became a popular cult song.

=== Telugu version ===
Criminal

Film score by M. M. Keeravani
- Released: 1994
- Genre: Soundtrack
- Length: 25:50
- Label: ANAND AUDIO
- Producer: M. M. Keeravani

M. M. Keeravani chronology
Major Chandrakanth (1993)	Criminal (1994)	Bhairava (1994)

All music is composed by M. M. Keeravani.

Track list
No.	Title	Lyrics	Singer(s)	Length
1.	"Mudante Vadante"	Vennelakanti	S. P. Balasubrahmanyam, K. S. Chithra	4:57
2.	"Paapki Paapki"	Sirivennela Sitaramasastri	K. S. Chithra, S. P. Balasubrahmanyam, M. M. Keeravani	4:58
3.	"Hello Guru"	Vennelakanti	K. S. Chithra, S. P. Balasubrahmanyam	4:48
4.	"Thelusa Manasa"	Sirivennela Sitaramasastri	K. S. Chithra, S. P. Balasubrahmanyam	6:13
5.	"Jama Jama Jama"	Sirivennela Sitaramasastri	K. S. Chithra, S. P. Balasubrahmanyam, Sujatha	5:04
6.	"Thelusa Manasa - 1"	Sirivennela Sitaramasastri	M. M. Keeravani, K. S. Chithra (Humming)	6:11
Total length:				32:11

=== Hindi version ===
Criminal

Film score by M. M. Kreem
- Released: 1995
- Genre: Soundtrack
- Length: 38:16
- Label: His Master's Voice
- Producer: M. M. Kreem

M. M. Kreem chronology
Major Chandrakanth (1995)	Criminal (1995)	Bhairava (1995)

Hindi lyrics were written by Indeevar. Original audio was released on His Master's Voice. At first the tracks of "Tu Mile Dil Khile- All versions" were recorded in the voice of K. S. Chithra but due to some unforeseen reasons all the tracks sung by Chithra were replaced by Alka Yagnik, but still Keeravani managed to keep the humming portion sung by Chithra intact in all the tracks. Most popular & iconic song in album "Tu Mile Dil Khile" sang by Kumar Sanu & Alka Yagnik.

No.	Title	Singer(s)	Length
1.	"Tu Mile Dil Khile (Duet)"	Kumar Sanu, Alka Yagnik	6:03
2.	"Tu Mile Dil Khile (Male)"	Kumar Sanu	6:13
3.	"Tu Mile Dil Khile (Female)"	Alka Yagnik	5:57
4.	"Jaanu Jaanu Jaanu"	Kumar Sanu, Alka Yagnik	5:10
5.	"Mujhko Chhupa Le"	Kumar Sanu, Alisha Chinai	4:49
6.	"Kisi Ka Tu Ho Ja"	Abhijeet Bhattacharya, K. S. Chithra	5:00
7.	"Keemti Keemti Hai Zindagi"	S. P. Balasubrahmanyam, K. S. Chithra	5:01
Total length:			38:16

=== Tamil version ===
The soundtrack was released in Tamil as Ellame En Kadhali. The lyrics for songs were written by Piraisoodan.

All music is composed by Maragathamani.

Track list
No.	Title	Lyrics	Singer(s)	Length
1.	"Muthathin"	Piraisoodan	K. S. Chithra, Mano	4:57
2.	"Party Party"	Piraisoodan	K. S. Chithra, Mano	4:58
3.	"Anbe Thodu"	Piraisoodan	K. S. Chithra, Mano	4:48
4.	"Uyire Uyire"	Piraisoodan	K. S. Chithra, Mano	6:13
5.	"Jama Jama Jama"	Piraisoodan	K. S. Chithra, Mano	5:04
Total length:				32:11

== Release and reception ==
Alluru Rahim of Zamin Ryot, reviewing the Telugu version of the film on 21 October 1994, described it as "the film which drives the audience out the theatres [sic]." While appreciating the Nagarjuna's performance and the soundtrack by Keeravani, Rahim opined that the film lacked good story and screenplay.

After the film's success, it was later dubbed and released in Tamil as Ellame En Kadhali. K. Vijiyan reviewing this version for New Straits Times on 3 July 1995, opined that Bhatt had made a faithful remake of The Fugitive.

== See also ==
- Nirnayam (1995 film), another Indian remake of The Fugitive
