= Rakshasudu (1986 film) =

- Movie Poster
- Directed by: A. Kodandarami Reddy
- Written by: M. V. S. Haranatha Rao (dialogues)
- Screenplay by: A. Kodandarami Reddy
- Story by: Yandamuri Veerendranath
- Based on: Rakshasudu (Novel)
- Produced by: K. S. Rama Rao
- Starring: Chiranjeevi; Suhasini; Radha
- Cinematography: Lok Singh
- Edited by: M. Vellaiswamy
- Music by: Ilaiyaraaja
- Production company: Creative Commercials
- Release date: 2 October 1986
- Running time: 146 mins
- Country: India
- Language: Telugu

Rakshasudu (transl. Demon) is a 1986 Telugu-language action crime film directed by A. Kodandarami Reddy, starring Chiranjeevi in the lead role. Produced by K. S. Rama Rao under the Creative Commercials banner, the film features Radha and Suhasini as the female leads, with Nagendra Babu making his acting debut in a supporting role. The film is based on Yandamuri Veerendranath's novel of the same name.

The music was composed by Ilaiyaraaja. Rakshasudu marked the third collaboration of Chiranjeevi, K. S. Rama Rao, Kodandarami Reddy, Yandamuri Veerendranath, and Ilaiyaraaja, following Abhilasha (1983) and Challenge (1984). The film was a commercial success, running for 100 days in 28 centres.

== Plot ==
The film begins with a widowed woman giving birth to a baby boy, but the local landlord disapproves and orders the baby to be disposed of. A drunkard finds the baby and raises him for a few years before selling him to a labor camp in exchange for money. Twenty years later, the boy, Purusha, along with his friend Simham, escapes from the labor camp in search of Purusha’s mother. When Purusha confronts the landlord for information about his mother, the landlord reveals she left long ago and demands a bribe of ₹10,000 for further details.

Purusha and Simham resort to stealing the money from a house, but they are caught by J. Krishna Murthy (JK), who surprisingly permits them to keep the stolen amount. However, by the time they return, the landlord has sold the information about Purusha’s mother to JK for ₹50,000. Angered, Purusha confronts JK, who reveals that he wants to use Purusha to stop his rival, a drug dealer. Initially reluctant, Purusha eventually agrees.

During a confrontation with the rival's men, Purusha is injured and jumps into a river, where he is rescued by Sumathi, a school teacher and an orphan, who also happens to be the sister of Inspector Vijay. As Purusha recovers, he devises a plan to raid critical documents that would incriminate Sailaja’s father, who is JK's rival. However, during the mission, Vijay is killed. The rest of the story follows Purusha as he seeks revenge and reunites with his mother.

== Cast ==
- Chiranjeevi as Purusha / Rakshasudu
- Radha as Sailaja / Sailu
- Suhasini as Sumathi
- Tiger Prabhakar as Vankachakra Ram Murthy / VR
- Rao Gopal Rao as J. Krishna Murthy / JK
- Nagendra Babu as Simham
- Rajendra Prasad as Inspector Vijay
- Allu Ramalingaiah as Narasimham
- Annapurna as Rakshasudu's mother
- Sumalatha as Vani
- Samyuktha as JK's daughter
- Jayamala as Tarakeswari
- M. V. S. Haranatha Rao as Narakasurudu
- Narra Venkateswara Rao as Chief Commander
- P. J. Sarma as SP Bhujanga Rao
- Vankayala Satyanarayana as Sumathi's father
- Bhimeswara Rao as Principal
- Vasudeva Rao as Rajan
- Jagga Rao
- Master Suresh as Young Rakshasudu

== Production ==
Rakshasudu marked the third collaboration of Chiranjeevi, K. S. Rama Rao, Kodandarami Reddy, Yandamuri Veerendranath, and Ilaiyaraaja, following Abhilasha (1983) and Challenge (1984). The film is notable for being the only one where Chiranjeevi's character has no name, with other characters referring to him simply as "friend" or "Purusha" (transl. man).

== Music ==
Rakshasudu

Film score by Ilaiyaraaja
- Released: 1986
- Genre: Soundtrack
- Length: 24:40
- Label: Echo Audio
- Producer: Ilaiyaraaja

Ilaiyaraaja chronology
| Swathi Muthyam (1986) | Rakshasudu (1986) | Kirathakudu (1986) |

The music was composed by Ilaiyaraaja. All the songs were chartbusters. Music released on Echo Audio Company.

| No. | Title | Lyrics | Singers | Length |
|---|---|---|---|---|
| 1. | "Hey Naughty" | Veturi | S. P. Balasubrahmanyam, S. Janaki | 4:24 |
| 2. | "Malli Malli" | Veturi | S. P. Balasubrahmanyam, S. Janaki | 4:30 |
| 3. | "Acha Acha" | Veturi | S. P. Balasubrahmanyam, S. Janaki | 4:28 |
| 4. | "Giliga Gili" | Veturi | S. P. Balasubrahmanyam, S. Janaki | 4:26 |
| 5. | "Nee Meeda" | Veturi | S. P. Balasubrahmanyam, S. Janaki | 4:31 |
| 6. | "Jaya Jaya" | Devulapalli Krishna Sastry | S. Janaki | 2:04 |

== Reception ==
Rakshasudu was a major commercial success, running for 100 days in 28 centres. A grand celebration marked its success, with special guests including Rajinikanth, Sridevi, K. Viswanath, and M. S. Reddy. During the event, Sridevi presented a memento to Chiranjeevi.

It was also dubbed into Tamil as Raatshashan and did well in Tamil Nadu as well. The Telugu version did well in reruns too.
