= Gudachari No.1 =

- Theatrical release poster
- Directed by: Kodi Ramakrishna
- Written by: Kodi Ramarkishna
- Screenplay by: Kodi Ramakrishna
- Produced by: T. Trivikrama Rao
- Starring: Chiranjeevi; Radhika; P. J. Sharma; P. L. Narayana; Rao Gopal Rao; Gollapudi Maruthi Rao; R. N. Sudarshan; Prabhakar Reddy; Jayamalini; Silk Smitha
- Cinematography: P. Lakshman
- Edited by: K. Balu
- Music by: K. Chakravarthy
- Production companies: Vauhini Studios; Prasad Studios
- Distributed by: Lakshmi Films
- Release date: 30 June 1983
- Country: India
- Language: Telugu

Gudachari No.1 is a 1983 Telugu-language spy film written and directed by Kodi Ramakrishna. Produced by T. Trivikrama Rao, the film stars Chiranjeevi and Radhika in pivotal roles.

== Plot ==
The film deals with Vijay, a C.B.I-Agent on a special operation to explore the illegal explosive manufacture, and export headed by underworld Don Supreme.

== Cast ==
- Chiranjeevi as Vijay
- Radhika as Radha
- Rao Gopal Rao as Govinda Rao
- Gollapudi Maruti Rao as Veeraswamy
- Bhanu Chander as Bujji
- M. Prabhakar Reddy as Ananda Murthy
- P. L. Narayana as priest
- P.J. Sarma as Dr. Raghunath
- R.N. Sudarshan as Supreme
- Silk Smitha as Laila
- Sarathi as Pakshula Papanna
- Narra Venkateswara Rao
- Raja as Kumar
- Sakshi Ranga Rao
- Mada Venkateswara Rao

== Soundtrack ==
All lyrics are written by Veturi Sundararama Murthy.

No.	Title	Singer(s)	Length
1.	"Chirru Burru"	S.P. Balasubrahmanyam, P. Susheela
2.	"Pista Bahar"	S.P. Balasubrahmanyam, P. Susheela
3.	"Sachi Naa Kadupuna"	S.P. Balasubrahmanyam, P. Susheela
4.	"Siggoyamma"	S.P. Balasubrahmanyam, P. Susheela
5.	"Vangathota Kada"	S.P. Balasubrahmanyam, P. Susheela
