= Donga Mogudu =

- Directed by: A. Kodandarami Reddy
- Written by: A. Kodandarami Reddy; Satyanand; Yandamuri Veerendranath
- Produced by: Venkanna Babu S. P.
- Starring: Chiranjeevi; Bhanupriya; Madhavi; Radhika
- Cinematography: Lok Singh
- Music by: K. Chakravarthy
- Release date: 9 January 1987
- Country: India
- Language: Telugu
- Box office: 3 Crores

Donga Mogudu (transl. Thieving husband) is a 1987 Indian Telugu-language film starring Chiranjeevi, Bhanupriya, Madhavi and Radhika. This film was directed by A. Kodandarami Reddy. Chiranjeevi portrayed a dual role in this film and the film was a block buster at box office . The film is based on Yandamuri Veerendranath's novel Nallanchu Tellachira.

== Plot ==
Ravi Teja is an industrialist who owns a textile company. He is a successful person in business, but his personal life lacks harmony and peace. Tortured by his wife and her mother, he finds life miserable. He will slowly fall for his beautiful Personal Assistant Priyamvada. Meanwhile, his opponents cannot stand his success in business and plan to stop him from getting yet another business deal. Here, he meets Nagaraju, who is a small-time thief. Ravi Teja is saved by Nagaraju and he plans to exchange their positions, so that his problems can be solved forever. Nagaraju agrees, and teaches Madhavi, her mother, and Ravi Teja's enemies a lesson. Ravi Teja faces a strange situation of leading a thief's lifestyle. He encounters Seeta, who is also a small-time thief. In the end, they both reveal their true identities and end the story on a happy note.

== Cast ==
- Chiranjeevi as Ravi Teja and Nagaraju
- Bhanupriya as Priyamvada
- Radhika as Geetha
- Madhavi as Lalitha, Ravi Teja's wife
- Gollapudi Maruthi Rao as Brahmaji
- Giri Babu as Gopalam
- Jayanthi as Savithri
- Rao Gopal Rao as Chenchuramaiah
- Allu Ramalingaiah
- Charan Raj
- Suthi Velu
- Ranganath
- Master Suresh
- Potti Prasad as Ramudu

== Soundtrack ==
Soundtrack composed by K. Chakravarthy was released through T-Series music label. Lyrics were written by Kosaraju, Rajasri and Sirivennela Seetharama Sastry.

Track list
No.	Title	Lyrics	Singer(s)	Length
1.	"Nallanchu Tella Cheera"	Sirivennela Seetharama Sastry	S. P. Balasubrahmanyam, P. Susheela	4:37
2.	"Ee Chempaku Selaveeyaku"	Sirivennela Seetharama Sastry	S. P. Balasubrahmanyam, P. Susheela	4:35
3.	"Kokammaa Cheppammaa"	Sirivennela Seetharama Sastry	S. P. Balasubrahmanyam, S. Janaki	4:23
4.	"Idly Papa Idly Papa"	Rajasri	S. P. Balasubrahmanyam, P. Susheela	4:23
5.	"Nee Kokakintha"	Sirivennela Seetharama Sastry	S. P. Balasubrahmanyam, S. Janaki	4:21
6.	"Addama Reyi"	Kosaraju	S. P. Balasubrahmanyam, P. Susheela, S. P. Sailaja	5:15
Total length:				27:36
