= Sivudu Sivudu Sivudu =

1983 Indian Telugu film by A. Kodandarami Reddy

- Poster
- Directed by: A. Kodandarami Reddy
- Starring: Chiranjeevi; Radhika; Jaggayya; Rao Gopal Rao
- Music by: K. Chakravarthy
- Release date: 9 June 1983
- Country: India
- Language: Telugu

Sivudu Sivudu Sivudu is a 1983 Telugu film directed by A. Kodandarami Reddy. The film stars Chiranjeevi, Radhika, Jaggayya, and Rao Gopal Rao in important roles. The film was a box office disaster.

== Cast ==
- Chiranjeevi
- Radhika Sarathkumar
- Jaggayya
- Rao Gopal Rao
- Gollapudi Maruthi Rao
- Giri Babu
- Rallapalli
- Vankayala
- Pramod Kumar
- R. Narayana Murthy
- Puspha Latha
- Annapurna
- Veeramachaneni Krishna Rao
- Veeramachaneni Prasad
- Madan Mohan
- Pattabhi
- Balaji
- Raju
- Justice
- Jaggu
- Rudramurthy
- Rajakumar

== Soundtrack ==
The soundtrack was composed by K. Chakravarthy

| No. | Title | Singer(s) | Length |
|---|---|---|---|
| 1. | "Navarasa Baritham" | S. P. Balasubrahmanyam, S. Janaki | 5:33 |
| 2. | "Rudrash Wara Veera" | S. P. Balasubrahmanyam | 3:46 |
| 3. | "Kothi Bava" | S. P. Balasubrahmanyam, S. Janaki | 4:36 |
| 4. | "Aakasamlo Taraa" | S. P. Balasubrahmanyam, S. Janaki | 4:24 |
| 5. | "Narude Harudu" | S. P. Balasubrahmanyam | 5:42 |
| 6. | "Idi Devudi Patanama" | S. P. Balasubrahmanyam | 3:17 |
