= Captain Nagarjun =

1986 film by V. B. Rajendra Prasad

Captain Nagarjuna
- Theatrical release poster
- Directed by: V. B. Rajendra Prasad
- Written by: V. B. Rajendra Prasad (story/screenplay); Acharya Athreya (dialogues)
- Produced by: V. B. Rajendra Prasad
- Starring: Akkineni Nagarjuna; Khushboo; Rajendra Prasad
- Cinematography: S. Navakanth
- Edited by: A. Sreekar Prasad; A. Sanjeevi
- Music by: Chakravarthy
- Production company: Jagapathi Art Pictures
- Release date: 29 August 1986
- Running time: 173 mins
- Country: India
- Language: Telugu

Captain Nagarjun is a 1986 Telugu-language romance film, produced and directed by V. B. Rajendra Prasad under the Jagapathi Art Pictures banner. It stars Akkineni Nagarjuna, Khushboo, Rajendra Prasad and music composed by Chakravarthy. The film was declared as a flop at the box office.

== Cast ==
- Akkineni Nagarjuna as Nagarjun
- Khushboo as Radha
- Rajendra Prasad as Ravi
- Nutan Prasad as Anand Rao
- Gollapudi Maruti Rao as Obbayah
- Subhalekha Sudhakar as Murthy
- Vinod as Prabhu
- Srilakshmi as Manju
- Lakshmi Priya as Nagarjuna's mother
- Dubbing Janaki as Radha's mother
- Kalpana Rai as Maid Kondamma

== Soundtrack ==
Captain Nagarjuna

Film score by Chakravarthy
- Released: 1986
- Genre: Soundtrack
- Length: 29:33
- Label: Echo Audio
- Producer: Chakravarthy

Chakravarthy chronology
Vikram (1986)	Captain Nagarjuna (1986)	Pratidwani (1986)

The music was composed by Chakravarthy. Lyrics written by Acharya Athreya. The music was released on ECHO Audio Company.

S. No.	Song title	Singers	length
1	"Okati"	S. P. Balasubrahmanyam	3:58
2	"Muvvalanni"	S. P. Balasubrahmanyam, P. Susheela	4:30
3	"Edi Andam"	S. P. Balasubrahmanyam	3:32
4	"Nuvvu Nenu"	S. P. Balasubrahmanyam, P. Susheela	4:28
5	"Manasu Padithe"	S. P. Balasubrahmanyam	4:15
6	"Taitaka"	S. P. Balasubrahmanyam, P. Susheela	4:28
7	"Eee Moodu"	P. Susheela	4:22
