= Jagadeka Veerudu Athiloka Sundari =

1990 Telugu-language fantasy film

- Theatrical release poster
- Directed by: K. Raghavendra Rao
- Written by: Jandhyala
- Story by: Yandamoori Veerendranath
- Produced by: C. Aswani Dutt
- Starring: Chiranjeevi; Sridevi; Amrish Puri
- Cinematography: A. Vincent; K. S. Prakash
- Edited by: Kotagiri Venkateswara Rao
- Music by: Ilaiyaraaja
- Production company: Vyjayanthi Movies
- Release date: 9 May 1990
- Country: India
- Language: Telugu
- Budget: ₹2 crore
- Box office: est. ₹15 crore

Jagadeka Veerudu Athiloka Sundari (transl. Universal hero and the otherworldly beauty), also known by the initialism JVAS, is a 1990 Indian Telugu-language fantasy film directed by K. Raghavendra Rao, who co-wrote the script with Jandhyala and Yandamuri Veerendranath. The film stars Chiranjeevi and Sridevi, while Amrish Puri, Kannada Prabhakar, Allu Ramalingaiah and Rami Reddy play supporting roles. The film is produced by C. Aswani Dutt on Vyjayanthi Movies banner. The plot revolves around a man who finds a ring that gives the bearer great power, but the goddess who lost the ring seeks it back to return to her world.

Jagadeka Veerudu Athiloka Sundari was theatrically released on 9 May 1990. Upon release, the film was a massive success, grossing ₹15 crore at the box office, becoming the highest grossing Telugu film in history at the time, and winning five state Nandi Awards. It has since achieved cult status.

== Plot ==
Raju, a courageous tour guide living in a hill station, raises four young orphans. When one of the children sustains a serious injury, a local Ayurvedic practitioner advises that the only cure lies in a rare herb found exclusively along the shores of Lake Manasarovar in the Himalayas. Raju travels to the region to retrieve the herb. Concurrently, Indraja, a celestial being and the daughter of Lord Indra, visits Manasarovar and accidentally drops her divine ring, which serves as her key to re-enter Svargam. Raju discovers the ring and wears it, unaware of its supernatural capabilities. Unable to return to the celestial realm without it, Indraja is instructed by the divine guru Brihaspati to retrieve the ring from Earth before the upcoming Kartika Purnima.

Indraja arrives in Raju's town in search of the ring. Unaccustomed to mortal social norms and speaking an archaic dialect, her claims of divine origin are dismissed, and she is presumed insane. Pitying her, Raju and the children provide her with shelter. While bonding with the children, Indraja repeatedly tries to recover the ring from Raju without revealing her intent.

During this period, Raju becomes embroiled in a dispute with KP, an arrogant millionaire who unleashes his henchmen against Raju. Supported unconsciously by the ring's invulnerability, Raju repeatedly fends off the attacks. Intrigued by Raju's uncanny strength, KP consults Mahadrashta, a sorcerer who practices human sacrifice. Analysing the situation, Mahadrashta identifies Indraja's celestial nature and plots to sacrifice her to achieve immortality.

After an accidental vehicle mishap leads to a misunderstanding, Raju briefly estranges Indraja. Shortly after, KP's men bomb the school, critically injuring one of the children. While the family sleeps, Indraja retrieves the ring, uses its divine power to heal the child, and reveals her true identity to Raju. Recognising her virtue, Raju repents his previous harshness, and the two express mutual romantic feelings.

Seeking to trip Raju of his advantage, Mahadrashta hypnotises one of the orphans to obtain the ring. However, a monkey snatches the ring during the exchange and accidentally drops it in a vessel of Kumkuma at the base of a Hanuman statue, leaving Raju unable to locate it. Exploiting the ring's absence, Mahadrashta plants false evidence framing Indraja as a practitioner of black magic, provoking a local mob to stone her before abducting her for his ritual.

The children discover the ring and hand it to Raju, who rushes to Mahadrashta's lair. With the ring's divine aid, Raju awakes Indraja from Mahadrashta's spell and disdaining the ring's assistance, he fights and kills Mahadrashta through human effort alone, asserting that mortal courage suffices to defeat evil. Restored to her senses upon touching the ring, Indraja destroys KP and his remaining forces.

As the deadline of Kartika Purnima arrives, Indraja faces a choice between returning to Svargam and retain her immortality to remain on Earth as a mortal with Raju and the children. Choosing love over divine status, Indraja discards the ring and returns to Raju.

== Cast ==
- Chiranjeevi as Raju, a hill station tour guide
- Sridevi as Indraja, the daughter of Lord Indra who hails from the celestial realm of Indraloka
- Amrish Puri as Mahadrashtha, a sorcerer who practices black magic
- Kannada Prabhakar as KP
- Allu Ramalingaiah as Ganga Jalam
- Rami Reddy as Abbulu
- Tanikella Bharani as Dasu
- Brahmanandam as Vichitra Kumar
- Prasad Babu as Narada
- Janagaraj as Police Inspector
- Sangeeta as Teacher
- Baby Shalini as Orphan Pandu
- Baby Shamlee as Orphan Bujji
- Master Amith as Orphan
- Master Richard as Orphan
- P. J. Sharma as Sage
- R. S. Shivaji as Malokam
- Crazy Mohan as Kannada speaking tourist

== Production ==
=== Development ===
Writer Srinivas Chakravati shared the idea of a story with Raghavendra Rao, where the daughter of Indra who comes to Earth loses her ring without which she cannot return to Indraloka. Raghavendra Rao liked the story and following a series of meetings and story discussion sessions with writer Yandamoori Veerendranath, Jandhyala, Satyanand and Crazy Mohan, developed it into a socio-fantasy drama. Chiranjeevi spent almost 25 days with the writing team.

Initially, it was decided that the protagonist Raju would go to the Moon in a rocket and meet goddess Indraja there. Since the barren surface of the Moon would not be suitable for song picturization, the idea was dropped. Then Chiranjeevi suggested the backdrop of Manasarovar, where Indraja lands and Raju goes to bring the magical herb that would heal the injured leg of the little girl. It was liked by all and was immediately approved.

Aswani Dutt recalls being fascinated by the socio-fantasy films made by the Vijaya Studios, especially Jagadeka Veeruni Katha (1961), which was an inspiration for him to produce this film.

=== Filming ===
The film marked the first collaboration between frequent collaborators, Aswani Dutt and Chiranjeevi. A massive set was raised at Vijaya Vauhini Studios in Madras for the film, which producer Dutt claimed was "perhaps the biggest set ever for a Telugu film, after Prema Nagar." This is the third time Chiranjeevi and Sridevi paired in onscreen. Three of the child actors in the film, Shalini, Richard Rishi, and Shamili are siblings in real life.

The song "Abba nee Thiyyani Debba" was choreographed by Sundaram. Cinematographer Ajay Vincent used polythene sheets smeared with vaseline to replicate the snow-filled hills of Manasarovar for the song "Andhaalalo Mahodayam". Chiranjeevi shot the song "Dhinakkuthaa Kasakkuro" despite suffering from fever with a body temperature of 104 degrees Fahrenheit. He sponged his body with ice and completed the shoot, allowing Sridevi to fly abroad for another shoot. Right after the shoot, he was admitted to Vijaya Hospital and was discharged after 15 days. Amrish Puri dubbed for himself in Telugu for the role of the sorcerer, Mahadrashta.

== Music ==
The soundtrack was composed by Ilaiyaraaja and all songs are written by Veturi. The song "Yamaho" is based on "Madurai Marikozhundhu" from the Tamil film Enga Ooru Pattukaran (1987). According to Chiranjeevi, Ilayaraja composed the song "Abbani Teeyani" within less than a day. The song "Abbanee Teeyani" went on to be reused in Hindi as Dhak Dhak Karne Laga in the film Beta (1992) and the tune of the same song was reused as "Kannathil Kannam Vaika" in the film Watchman Vadivel (1994). The music rights of the film were acquired by Aditya Music. The film's songs composed by Ilaiyaraaja were instant chartbusters.

Telugu (original) tracklist

No.	Title	Singer(s)	Length
1.	"Yamaho Nee"	S. P. Balasubrahmanyam, S. Janaki	4:28
2.	"Abbanee"	S. P. Balasubrahmanyam, K. S. Chithra	4:53
3.	"Priyatama"	S. P. Balasubrahmanyam, S. Janaki	5:58
4.	"Mana Bharathamlo"	S. P. Balasubrahmanyam	4:26
5.	"Andalalo"	S. P. Balasubrahmanyam, S. Janaki	5:01
6.	"Dhinakkuta"	S. P. Balasubrahmanyam, K. S. Chithra	4:58
7.	"Jai Chiranjeeva"	S. P. Sailaja	3:01
Total length:			32:48

Hindi (dubbed) (Aadmi Aur Apsara) tracklist

All lyrics are written by Indeevar.

No.	Title	Singer(s)	Length
1.	"Chamke Tu Chama Chama Chham Chham"	Kavita Krishnamurthy, Amit Kumar	4:28
2.	"Tumne Is Tarah Maara Dekh Gaya Mai Zamarla Tumhara"	Kavita Krishnamurthy, Amit Kumar	4:53
3.	"Balama Hai Tu Mere Dil Ka Mehma"	Kavita Krishnamurthy, Amit Kumar	5:58
4.	"Pehle Bharat Me Korawo Pandawo Ka Raj Tha"	Amit Kumar	4:26
5.	"Sundar Dekho Lage Bada Shama"	Kavita Krishnamurthy, Amit Kumar	5:01
6.	"Tanak Dhin Ta, Tanak Dhin Ta"	Kavita Krishnamurthy, Amit Kumar	4:58
Total length:			29:47

== Reception ==
The film had 100-day runs in a number of theaters and a 200-day run in one centre, it grossed 15 crores at the box office and broke all the records which were set up by past movies and became an all-time blockbuster. This film's box office performance was undeterred by the floods raging then united Andhra Pradesh.

The film was subsequently dubbed in Hindi as Aadmi Aur Apsara, in Tamil as Kaadhal Devathai, and in Malayalam as Hai Sundari.

== Legacy ==
Jagadeka Veerudu Athiloka Sundari is regarded as a classic fantasy film in Telugu cinema.

Hemanth Kumar CR writing for Vogue India in February 2020 noted, "The dazzling chemistry of the lead actors, along with Ilaiyaraaja’s chart-busting music, and the epic nature of the film propelled it into one of the biggest hits of all time." Further, he listed the film among the seven Telugu films to watch for fans of fantasy genre.

Karthik Keramulu writing for Film Companion in July 2021 noted, "This is a bloody entertaining fantasy drama that has everything in equal measure – over the top action sequences, a sorcerer as the villain, a goddess in the form of Sridevi, a heartthrob with the face of Chiranjeevi, a finger ring that possesses magical powers, and amazing songs by Ilaiyaraaja. This is a lethal combination that today's movies do not have the temerity to fight against."

== Awards ==
Filmfare Awards South

- Filmfare Award for Best Director – Telugu – K. Raghavendra Rao (1990)

Nandi Awards

- Best Music Director – Ilaiyaraaja
- Best Audiographer - A. R. Swaminadhan
- Best Costume Designer - M. Krishna
- Best Art Director - B. Chalam
- Best Choreographer - Sundaram Master

== Potential sequel ==
In May 2020, producer Dutt stated that a sequel is already on the cards, which would be about the offspring of Indraja and Raju. Over speculations that Ram Charan and Janhvi Kapoor (son and daughter of Chiranjeevi and Sridevi respectively) are being considered, Dutt responded by saying, "it'll be wonderful if it can happen."
