= Goonda (film) =

- Theatrical release poster
- Directed by: A. Kodandarami Reddy
- Written by: Satyanand (story&dialogue)
- Screenplay by: A. Kodandarami Reddy
- Produced by: Midde Ramarao
- Starring: Chiranjeevi; Radha; Kaikala Satyanarayana; Allu Ramalingaiah; Rao Gopal Rao
- Cinematography: A. Venkat
- Edited by: D. Venkataratnam
- Music by: K. Chakravarthy
- Release date: 23 February 1984
- Country: India
- Language: Telugu

Goonda is a 1984 Indian Telugu film directed by A. Kodandarami Reddy. This film stars Chiranjeevi, Radha, Kaikala Satyanarayana, Rao Gopal Rao and Allu Ramalingiah. The film was recorded as a "Hit" at the box office.

== Plot ==
Ravi (Chiranjeevi) is the son of a sincere Police officer (Satyanarayana). Ravi accidentally hurts his neighbour's eyes and becomes responsible for his blindness. Fearing that his father would scold him, he runs away from home and is brought up by a don in Calcutta, who names him Kalidas. The don dies in an encounter and Kali is asked to leave the world of crime and become a good citizen. Kalidas changes his name to Raja and while traveling in a train, saves his father, later realising their relationship. Because of his criminal background he does not reveal that he is his son. Satyanarayana takes him to his house and introduces Raja to his family members. His father is to face the local goons headed by Rao Gopala Rao. In the meantime he meets Radha, and comes to realise that she is the daughter of the person who became blind because of him. Raja helps her in having her father's eyesight returned and wins her heart. How he wins the hearts of his family members and helps his father in catching the local goondas is the rest of the story.

== Cast ==
- Chiranjeevi as Kalidas/Raja/Ravi
- Radha as Jayanti aka Jaya
- Kaikala Satyanarayana as S.P. Ananda Rao
- Rao Gopal Rao as Dharmaraju
- Allu Ramalingiah as Kailasam
- Nutan Prasad
- Rajeev as Kasiram
- Annapoorna as Sarada
- Silk Smitha as Mohini
- Ramadas as Bhupal
- Chakrapani as Sekhar
- Suthi Velu
- Suthi Veerabhadra Rao

== Soundtrack ==
No.	Title	Singer(s)	Length
1.	"Andagatte Aatakemo Song"	S. P. Balu, P. Susheela
2.	"Gundalu Teesina"	SP Balu, S. Janaki
3.	"Kommalaki"	S. P. Balu, P. Susheela
4.	"Kommekki Kusindi"	S. P. Balu, S. Janaki
5.	"Na Geetam Nee"	S. P. Balu, P. Susheela
