= Punyasthree =

- Poster
- Directed by: Ravi Raja Pinisetty
- Written by: Sainath Thotapalli (dialogues)
- Screenplay by: Ravi Raja Pinisetty
- Story by: Visu
- Produced by: K. Benarjee
- Starring: Karthik; Bhavya; Rajendra Prasad
- Cinematography: K. S. Hari
- Edited by: Kotagiri Venkateswara Rao
- Music by: Chakravarthy
- Production company: Pramoda Art Films
- Release date: 28 March 1986
- Running time: 131 minutes
- Country: India
- Language: Telugu

Punyasthree is a 1986 Indian Telugu-language drama film directed by Ravi Raja Pinisetty. The film stars Karthik, Bhavya and Rajendra Prasad, with music composed by Chakravarthy. It is a remake of the Tamil film Aval Sumangalithan (1985).

== Cast ==
- Karthik as Bhaskar
- Bhavya as Lakshmi
- Rajendra Prasad as Peter
- Gollapudi Maruti Rao as Babu Rao
- P. J. Sarma as Dr. Sriram Murthy
- Ali as Balu
- Annapurna as Parvathi
- Samyutha as Stella

== Soundtrack ==
Music composed by Chakravarthy. Lyrics were written by Veturi.

Song title	Singers	length
"Mounama Kopama"	S. P. Balasubrahmanyam	3:48
"Munjethiki"	S. Janaki	2:10
"Gadapu Sari Garapu"	S. P. Balasubrahmanyam, S. Janaki	4:21
"Puvvulalo"	S. P. Balasubrahmanyam, S. Janaki	2:55
