= Rakta Sindhuram =

- Theatrical release poster
- Directed by: A. Kodandarami Reddy
- Written by: Yandamuri Veerendranath
- Produced by: A. Shesha Ratnam
- Starring: Chiranjeevi; Radha; Kaikala Satyanarayana
- Cinematography: Lok Singh
- Edited by: Kotagiri Venkateswara Rao
- Music by: K. Chakravarthy
- Production company: Gopi Films
- Release date: 24 August 1985
- Country: India
- Language: Telugu

Rakta Sindhuram is a 1985 Indian Telugu-language film directed by A. Kodandarami Reddy. The film stars Chiranjeevi Radha and Kaikala Satyanarayana. It is based on the novel of the same name by Yandamuri Veerendranath. The film was recorded as a "Hit" at the box office.

== Cast ==
- Chiranjeevi as Police Inspector Gopi / Gandragoddali (dual role)
- Radha as Rekha
- Kaikala Satyanarayana as Damodar Rao
- Gummadi as Superintendent of Police Jagannatham
- Nutan Prasad as Peda Kapu
- Suthi Velu as Damodar Rao's Secretary
- Suthi Veerabhadra Rao as Doctor
- Sudarshan as Bheemaraju
- Sivaprasad as Inspector Ajay
- P.J. Sarma as Inspector General of Police
- Annapoorna as Saradamma (Gopi's mother)
- Suryakantam as Women's hostel Warden (special appearance)

== Soundtrack ==
All songs were written by Veturi and composed by K. Chakravarthy.

Song	Playback Singers	Length
"Idi Sarigama Padina"	S. P. Balasubrahmanyam, P. Susheela	4:12
"Gummallo Muddu Gummaalalo"	S. P. Balasubrahmanyam, P. Susheela	4:15
"Hamma Hammamma Emito	S. P. Balasubrahmanyam, S. Janaki	4:13
"Kadilindi Kalki Avataramu"	S. P. Balasubrahmanyam	4:32
"O Chinnadana Naa Onti Badha"	S. P. Balasubrahmanyam, P. Susheela	4:00
