= Gollapudi Maruti Rao =

Indian actor, writer, director (1939–2019)

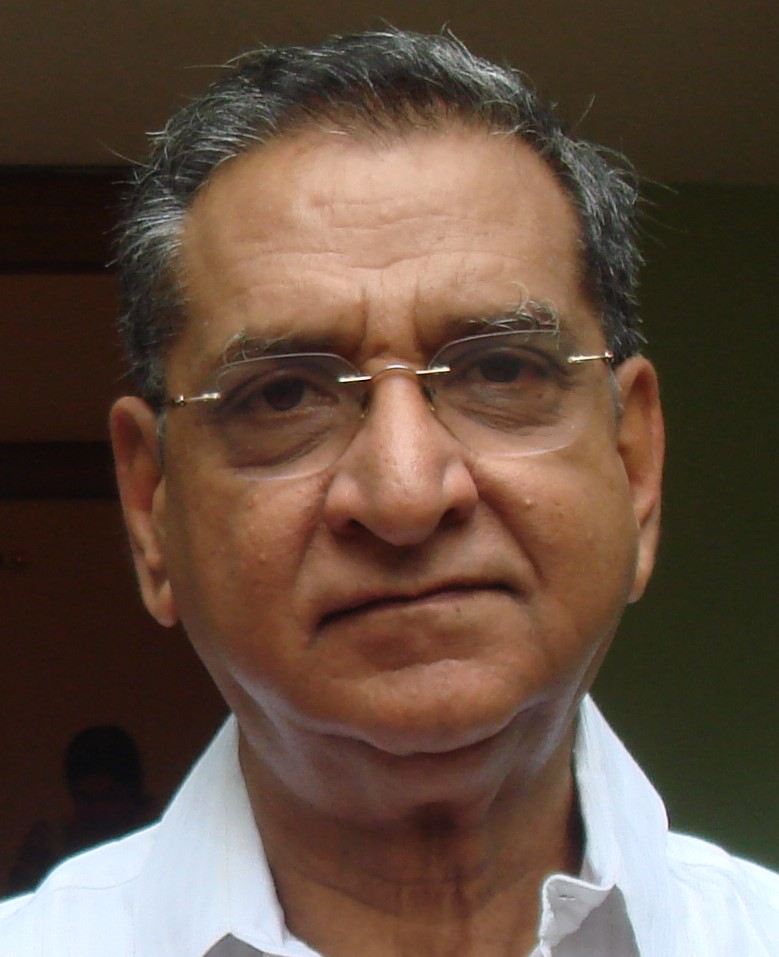
- Rao in 2007
- Born: 14 April 1939; Vizianagaram, Madras Presidency, British India
- Died: 12 December 2019 (aged 80); Chennai, Tamil Nadu, India
- Occupations: Actor; writer; director
- Children: 1 (deceased)

Gollapudi Maruti Rao (14 April 1939 – 12 December 2019) was an Indian actor, writer and director known for his works in Telugu cinema, Telugu theatre, and Telugu literature. Maruti Rao acted in over 250 Telugu films in a variety of roles. His noted literary works and plays, like Rendu Rellu Aaru, Patita, Karuninchani Devatalu, Mahanatudu, Kaalam Venakku Tirigindi, Aasayaalaku Sankellu, won numerous State Awards.

He was a member of the Script Scrutiny Committee of National Film Development Corporation and served as a Jury Member at International Film Festival of India for the Indian Panorama section in 1996. He was known for scripting landmark films like Doctor Chakravarthy, Tharangini, Samsaram Chadharangam, Kallu etc. He garnered six Andhra Pradesh State Nandi Awards. In 1997, he established the Gollapudi Srinivas Memorial Foundation, which presents the Gollapudi National Award, for the best first film of a director in Indian cinema.

Rao was also known for his works in All India Radio and Journalism, for over two decades. His play was included in the Master of Arts (Telugu literature) curriculum of Osmania University. This work was translated into all Indian languages by the National Book Trust, under the Aadaan Pradaan programme. The work was remade into a Telugu film in 1988 which won the Nandi Award for the Best Story in 1989. His 1975 play Kallu, was also remade into a Telugu film Kallu, which also garnered Nandi Award for Best Feature Film. His play Oka Chettu – Rende Puvvulu was purchased by the Song and Drama Division, Ministry of Information and Broadcasting for popular exhibition.

A volume of essays on theatre, Telugu Nataka Rangam, was prescribed as a textbook for the Department of Theatre Arts, Andhra University, Visakhapatnam (1967). He published two research articles appearing in Andhra Vignana Sarvaswam (Telugu Encyclopedia) 11th volume: "History of the development in 'Thought' and 'Technique' of Telugu Play-writing" and "Amateur Theatre – its origin and growth in relation to the World Amateur Theatre movement. His Telugu play Vandemaataram, the first one in Telugu about the Sino-Indian War, was published by Andhra Pradesh State Information & Public Relations Department, (1963).

== Early life ==
Maruti Rao was born in a Telugu-speaking Brahmin family on 14 April 1939, in Nandabalaga Village, Vizianagaram District, Andhra Pradesh, India and graduated from Andhra University, Visakhapatnam, Andhra Pradesh in 1959 specializing in B.Sc. Mathematical Physics.

== Literary activity ==
Maruti Rao has written and published several plays (9), playlets (18), novels (12), story volumes (4), essays (2), and children's stories (3). He wrote a weekly column, "Jeevana Kaalam" (The Living Times), a kaleidoscopic study of contemporary social and political issues for over 24 years. It was a very popular feature in one of the largest circulated Telugu dailies of Andhra Pradesh, Andhra Jyothy, and the feature continued to appear in Vaartha (Daily). His column with an audio reading (his voice) is presented, in an internet magazine Koumudi.

His autobiography Amma Kadupu Challaga, a 550-page compendium of his memoirs was released in India, USA and Australia. A travelogue Tanzania Teerthayatra was published by Koumudi in the US in 2008 in its collection. It is based on a 15-day safari with his friend Ganti Prasada Rao in the major national parks and historical places in Tanzania. The novel Pidikedu Aakaasham was released as an audio publication on 16 February 2009 while conferring the Lifetime Achievement Award by the Vanguri Foundation in Hyderabad.

== Death ==
He died on 12 December 2019 in Chennai. The loss of Gollapudi Maruti Rao was mourned by several noted writers and members of the Telugu film fraternity.

== Awards ==
Nandi Awards

- Best Story Writer – Aatma Gowravam (1965)
- Best Story Writer – Kallu (1988)
- Best Male Comedian – Tarangini (1983)
- Best Character Actor – Ramayanamlo Bhagavatham (1985)
- Best Dialogue Writer – Master Kapuram (1990)
- Best Screenplay Writer – Prema Pusthakam (1993)
- Nandi Award for Best Actor (Television) (1996)

All India Radio Awards

- Best Script in the Inter-University Radio play contest conducted by All India Radio, for Anantam (1959)
- Mahatma Gandhi Award for Creative Literature in an All India Contest, for Prasna

== Literary awards and honours ==
Sangam Academy Awards

- Sangam Academy Award for Best Play Kallu (1975)
- Sarvaraya Dharmanidhi Puraskaram for the Best Humorous Writing (1983)

Other awards

- Gurazada Apparao Memorial Gold Medal by Vamsee Art Theatre (1985)
- Telugu Velugu Award (1987)
- Madras Telugu Academy Award for Best All-rounder (1996)
- Paidi Lakshmayya Dharmanidhi Puraskaram (2002)
- Pulikanti Krishna Reddy Puraskaram (2007)
- Sarvaraya Memorial Puraskaram
- Andhra Nataka Kala Parishad Award
- Narasaraopeta Rangasthali Pratibha Puraskaram (2018) # First award recipient

== Selected filmography ==
=== Telugu films ===
- Intlo Ramayya Veedhilo Krishnayya (1982) – Subbarao
- Idi Pellantara (1982)
- Trisulam (1982)
- Shivudu Shivudu Shivudu (1983)
- Triveni Sangamam (1983)
- Palletoori Monagadu (1983)
- Chandirani (1983)
- Simhapuri Simham (1983)
- Abhilasha (1983) – Pydithalli
- Raju Rani Jackie (1983) – Joker
- Gudachari No.1 (1983) – Veerasawmy
- Mukku Pudaka (1983)
- Aalaya Sikharam (1983)
- Jagan (1984) – Maruti Rao
- James Bond 999 (1984) – Maruti
- Merupu Daadi (1984)
- Ee Charitra Inkennallu (1984) – Criminal Lawyer Chakravarthy
- Devanthakudu (1984)
- Danavudu (1984) – Mastan
- Padmavyuham (1984) – Jagannatham
- Srimathi Kaavali (1984)
- Challenge (1984)
- Manishiko Charitra (1984)
- Pralaya Simham (1984) – Varma
- Swati (1984)
- Sri Katna Leelalu (1985) – Seethapathi
- Maa Inti Mahalakshmi (1985) – Lawyer P.K. Murthy
- Punnami Ratri (1985) – Sakalalingeswara Rao
- Maa Pallelo Gopaludu (1985)
- Dongallo Dora (1985)
- Illale Devata (1985)
- Donga (1985)
- Musugu Donga (1985) – Govindam
- Kotha Pelli Koothuru (1985)
- Srivaru (1985) – Gangadhar Rao
- Sravana Sandhya (1986) – Amrutha Rao
- Swathi Muthyam (1986)
- Captain Nagarjun (1986)
- Dharmapeetam Daddarillindi (1986)
- Pavitra (1986)
- Captain Nagarjun (1986)
- Muddula Krishnayya (1986)
- Dhairyavanthudu (1986)
- Seetharama Kalyanam (1986)
- Mannemlo Monagadu (1986)
- Punyasthree (1986)
- Sravana Sandhya (1986)
- Desoddharakudu (1986)
- Iddaru Mithrulu (1986) – Koko aka Kodeekala Koteswara Rao
- Kaliyuga Krishnudu (1986) – Sambaiah
- Naa Pilupe Prabhanjanam (1986) – Salahala Rao
- Konte Kapuram (1986)
- Sakkanodu (1986)
- Maa Voori Magadu (1987) – Vande Mataram Babai
- Dongodochadu (1987) – Bhajagovindam
- Sthree Sahasam (1987) – Harischandra Rao
- Donga Mogudu (1987)
- Ummadi Mogudu (1987)
- Bhargava Ramudu (1987)
- Agni Putrudu (1987)
- Peliloi Pellilu (1987)
- Kaboye Alludu (1987)
- Trimurtulu (1987) as Cameo
- Srinivasa Kalyanam (1987)
- Kirai Dada (1987)
- Jebu Donga (1987) – Balaram
- Ummadi Mogudu (1987)
- Samsaram Oka Chadarangam (1987) – Appala Narasaiah
- Bhale Mogudu (1987)
- Madana Gopaludu (1987)
- Yamudiki Mogudu (1988) – Kailasam
- Murali Krishnudu (1988)
- Varasudochadu (1988)
- Chuttalabbayi (1988)
- Inspector Pratap (1988)
- Donga Pelli (1988)
- Samsaram (1988)
- Marana Mrudangam (1988)
- Rowdy No 1 (1988)
- Bharya Bhartalu (1988) – Veerabhadraiah
- Pelli Chesi Choodu (1988) – Parameswara Rao
- Chikkadu Dorakadu (1988)
- O Bharya Katha (1988) – Gopal Rao
- Bharyabhartala Bandam (1988)
- Agni Keratalu (1988) – Seshendra
- Jamadagni (1988)
- Kaliyuga Karnudu (1988) – Lawyer Bhanumurthy
- Prema (1989)
- Simha Swapnam (1989)
- Goonda Rajyam (1989) – Bangaraiah
- Swathi Chinukulu (1989)
- Bhale Dampathulu (1989)
- Manchi Kutumbam (1989)
- Shiva (1989)
- Indrudu Chandrudu (1989)
- Naa Mogudu Naake Sontham (1989)
- Sarvabhomudu (1989)
- Yama Pasam (1989)
- Soggadi Kaapuram (1989) – Venugopal's father-in-law
- Dorikithe Dongalu (1989) – Pithambaram
- Muthyamantha Muddu (1989)
- Chettu Kinda Pleader (1989) – Sarabhayya
- Vicky Daada (1989) – Amrutha Rao
- Neti Charitra (1990) – Vallabha Rao
- Jayasimha (1990) – Kolla Simhadri Nayudu
- Kodama Simham (1990)
- Alludugaru (1990)
- Iddaru Iddare (1990)
- Sahasa Putrudu (1990)
- Police Bharya (1990)
- Raja Vikramarka (1990) – Kanaka Rao
- Assembly Rowdy (1991)
- Srivari Chindulu (1991)
- Jeevana Chadarangam (1991)
- Aditya 369 (1991) – Curator
- Prema Entha Madhuram (1991) – Narayan Rao
- Balarama Krishnulu (1992) – Villain
- Sundara Kanda (1992)
- Prema Drohi (1992)
- Jagannatham & Sons (1992)
- Sahasam (1992)
- Golmaal Govindam (1992)
- Prema Pusthakam (1993)
- Illu Pelli (1993)
- Chirunavvula Varamistava (1993)
- Gharana Alludu (1994) – Bullabbai
- Atha Kodalu (1994)
- Bangaru Mogudu (1994)
- Punya Bhoomi Naa Desam (1994)
- Bhale Mavayya (1994)
- Muddula Priyudu (1994)
- Presidentgari Alludu (1994) – Somaraju
- Subha Sankalpam (1995) – Chennakesava Rao
- Vajram (1995)
- Hello Neeku Naaku Pellanta (1996)
- Velugu Needalu (1999)
- Murari (2001) – Chanti
- Andamaina Manasulo (2008)
- Rainbow (2008)
- Leader (2010)
- Inkosari (2010)
- Broker (2010) – Master
- Dhoni (2012)
- Daruvu (2012) – Chief Minister
- Uu Kodathara? Ulikki Padathara? (2012) – Venkat Rao
- Donga Police (2013)
- Sukumarudu (2013)
- Rowdy Fellow (2014)
- Kanche (2015) – Kondayya
- Size Zero (2015)
- Brahmotsavam (2016)
- Manamantha (2016)
- Ism (2016)
- Prematho Mee Karthik (2017)
- Sapthagiri LLB (2017)
- Jodi (2019)

=== Other language films ===
- Abdulla (1960; Hindi)
- Onnum Theriyatha Pappa (1991; Tamil)
- Hey Ram (2000, Tamil/Hindi film) – Govardhan
- Inji Iduppazhagi (2015, Tamil)

Television

- Intinti Ramayanam (1997)
- Kanyasulkam (2015)

Writer

- Chelleli Kapuram (1971)
- Raitu Kutumbam (1972)
- Papam Pasivadu (1972)
- Dorababu (1974)
- O Seeta Katha (1974)
- Annadammula Anubandham (1975)
- Nindu Manishi (1978)
- Maavari Manchitanam (1979)
- Garjanai (1981) (Tamil/Malayalam/Kannada)
- Subhalekha (1982)
- Kallu (1988)
- Intlo Ramayya Veedhilo Krishnayya (1982)

Director

- Prema Pustakam (1993)
