= Marana Mrudangam =

- Theatrical poster
- Directed by: A. Kodandarami Reddy
- Written by: Yandamoori Veerendranath (novel); Sainath Thotapalli (dialogues)
- Produced by: K. S. Rama Rao
- Starring: Chiranjeevi; Radha; Suhasini
- Cinematography: Lok Singh
- Edited by: M. Vellaiswamy
- Music by: Ilaiyaraaja
- Production company: Creative Commercials
- Release date: 4 August 1988
- Country: India
- Language: Telugu

Marana Mrudangam (transl. Percussions of death) is a 1988 Indian Telugu-language action crime film directed by A. Kodandarami Reddy. Produced by K. S. Rama Rao under the Creative Commercials banner, it stars Chiranjeevi, Radha, Suhasini, and Naga Babu in lead roles. Based on the novel of the same name by Yandamuri Veerendranath, Marana Mrudangam features a musical score composed by Ilayaraja.

Notably, Marana Mrudangam was the first film in which Chiranjeevi was credited onscreen with the title "Megastar," replacing his earlier title of "Supreme Hero." This title later became synonymous with Chiranjeevi’s name. The film also gained attention due to an incident during its shoot when Chiranjeevi was poisoned by a fan.

== Plot ==
Janardhan "Jaani" runs a small casino with his partner Bhillu. One day, he offers a lift to two women, Anusha (Radha) and Utpala, whose car breaks down. Anusha, recalling Jaani's help, mentions it in an interview, leading Utpala to secure a nursing job at a hospital. Jaani and Bhillu also help Anusha by eliminating a rival, enabling her to get a job.

One day, Bhillu discovers cocaine in an egg in his kitchen, prompting an investigation. They trace the source to a shop owned by a man named Pogaku Subba Rao. Their inquiry reveals that Subba Rao has connections with the underworld don, Vasanth Dada, who not only runs a criminal empire but also offers jobs to unemployed people, while engaging in illegal activities such as selling body parts. Utpala’s unemployed brother Sarma gets trapped in this operation and leaves home. Utpala seeks Jaani’s help to find her brother. Jaani starts investigating after realizing that the phone number Utpala provided leads to a location in the city.

Meanwhile, Anusha files a complaint about Subba Rao and his nephew Sudhakar’s dark dealings. Salim, a police officer working undercover, attempts to interrogate Anusha but tries to assault her. Jaani saves her, and the two fall in love. They continue to investigate Vasanth Dada’s operations. They discover a letter left by Sarma that reveals the criminal activities at Dada’s hideout. However, Salim kills Sarma, the only witness to the underworld activities, in a hospital.

Jaani and Anusha confront Vasanth Dada, but Dada’s men capture them and are left as prey for vultures in a desert. Using a magnifying glass dropped by Pogaku Subba Rao, they escape their bindings and attack Dada’s men. In the final confrontation, Jaani and Bhillu defeat Vasanth Dada, and Jaani marries Anusha.

== Cast ==
- Chiranjeevi as Janardhan aka Jaani
- Radha as Anusha
- Suhasini as Uthpala
- Nagendra Babu as Bhillu
- Satyanarayana
- Suresh Oberoi as Vasant Dada
- Ranjeet as Saleem Shankar
- Gollapudi Maruthi Rao as Subba Rao
- Prasad Babu as Sarma
- Brahmanandam
- Gummadi
- Sudhakar
- Pradeep Shakthi
- Ranganath
- Sakshi Ranga Rao

== Production ==
Marana Mrudangam was produced by Creative Commercials and directed by A. Kodandarami Reddy. Based on Yandamuri Veerendranath's novel, the film was shot in outdoor locations around Madras. It was the first film where Chiranjeevi was credited onscreen with the title "Megastar," replacing the earlier titles of "Supreme Hero" and "Dynamic Hero." Producer K. S. Rama Rao played a key role in popularizing this title, which later became synonymous with Chiranjeevi's name.

=== Poisoning attempt ===
During the shoot of Marana Mrudangam, many of Chiranjeevi's fans gathered at the location. During a break, a fan approached him, claiming it was his birthday and asking to cut a cake in the actor’s presence. The fan tried to force the cake into Chiranjeevi’s mouth, but the actor stopped him. After some of the cake was consumed, Chiranjeevi’s lips began to turn blue, and it was soon discovered that the cake contained suspicious substances. The fan's strange behaviour raised suspicions, and it was confirmed that the actor had been poisoned. Chiranjeevi was quickly rushed to the hospital, where he was treated with an antidote and recovered. Later in 2023, Chiranjeevi revealed that the fan admitted to poisoning the cake in an attempt to get closer to him, feeling that the actor had been distant. Chiranjeevi took the incident lightly, attributing it to misguided admiration.

== Music ==
The music for the movie was composed by Ilayaraja and all lyrics were penned by Veturi. The song "Godave Godavamma" was choreographed by Chiranjeevi himself.

Track Listing
No.	Title	Singer(s)	Length
1.	"Godave Godavama"	S. P. Balasubrahmanyam, K.S Chitra
2.	"Jungili Jima"	S. P. Balasubrahmanyam, Durga
3.	"Karigipoyaanu"	S. P. Balasubrahmanyam, P. Suseela
4.	"Kottandi Tittandi"	S. P. Balasubrahmanyam, K. S. Chithra
5.	"Sarigama Padanisa"	S. P. Balasubrahmanyam, K. S. Chithra
