= Tulasi Dalam =

1980 novel by Yandamuri Veerendranath

- Author: Yandamuri Veerendranath
- Language: Telugu
- Genre: Novel
- Published: 1981
- Publication place: India

Tulasi Dalam (transl. Holy basil leaf) is a Telugu thriller novel by Yandamuri Veerendranath. First published as a serial in Andhra Bhoomi weekly in 1980, the novel gained significant popularity and was later republished as a paperback in 1981, selling approximately 50,000 copies. Known for its gripping narrative style, it is considered one of Yandamuri's early works that contributed to his recognition as a writer.

The novel was partially inspired by the 1971 bestseller The Exorcist. Tulasi Dalam's success led to multiple adaptations, including the 1985 Kannada film Thulasidala, the 1989 Telugu film Tulasidalam, and the 2008 Hindi film Phoonk as well as its Telugu remake Raksha (2008).

== Plot ==
Sridhar, a self-made millionaire and director at a multinational company, lives a peaceful life in Hyderabad with his wife Sarada, younger sister Anita, and Sarada's mute brother Narayana Rao. After eight years of marriage, Sarada conceives a child, but shortly afterward, Sridhar loses his ability to father children due to an accident. The couple names their daughter Tulasi and raises her with immense love and care. When Tulasi is six, Sridhar saves his employer Richard's grandchild from a fatal accident. As a gesture of gratitude, Richard arranges for Tulasi to receive ₹20 lakh on her tenth birthday, stipulating in his will that if she dies before then, the money will go to an orphanage run by Chidananda Swami.

As Sridhar's company prepares to send him and his family to Paris for work, Tulasi suddenly falls ill, postponing their plans. Her condition worsens with bizarre and unexplained symptoms, baffling experienced doctors. With her tenth birthday approaching, the family desperately seeks solutions. Sarada turns to Jayadev, a renowned hypnotist, while Sridhar seeks the help of Santhaan Fakir, a paranormal expert. Meanwhile, Anita explores an alternative path to save Tulasi.

Sridhar, accompanied by his engineer Brahmin and lawyer Vidyapathi, travels to Orissa to confront Kadra, a malevolent force behind Tulasi's condition. Sarada and Jayadev stay with Tulasi to shield her from harmful hypnotic influences. The story culminates in their efforts to save Tulasi and reveals whether they succeed in overcoming the sinister forces threatening her life.

== Reception ==
Tulasi Dalam gained wide popularity and acclaim when it was published as a weekly serial. It helped Yandamuri to establish himself as a professional writer. Though many critics panned it saying that it was helping to re-popularize the forgotten superstitions regarding witchcraft, it remained as one of the best selling novels in Telugu literature.

== Adaptations ==
=== Film ===
Tulasi Dalam was first adapted into the 1985 Kannada film Thulasidala, directed by Vemagal Jagannath Rao and starring Sarath Babu and Aarthi. In 1989, the novel was adapted into the Telugu film Tulasidalam. It was later adapted into the Hindi film Phoonk (2008) and its Telugu remake Raksha (2008).

=== Television ===
Tulasi Dalam was adapted into a television series that aired on Gemini TV from 1999 to 2000. Directed by Yandamuri Veerendranath, the series received several awards, including the Nandi Award. It was later adapted into a daily soap on Star Maa, but this version was less successful.

== Sequel ==
It was followed by novel Tulasi which starts ten years after the events of the first book. The 1986 Indian Telugu-language horror film Kashmora is based on this novel.
