= A. Kodandarami Reddy =

Indian film director (born 1950)

Kodandarami Reddy
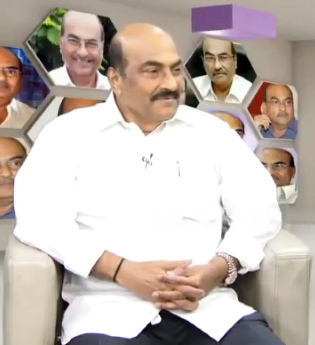
- Kodandarami in 2017
- Born: 1 July 1950 (age 76); Nellore, Madras State (now in Andhra Pradesh), India
- Occupation: Film director
- Years active: 1980-2009
- Spouse: Bharathi
- Children: Sunil Reddy; Vaibhav Reddy

A. Kodandarami Reddy (born 1 July 1950) is an Indian film director best known for his works in Telugu cinema. His association with Chiranjeevi created blockbusters in multiple genres such as Nyayam Kavali (1981), Khaidi (1983), Abhilasha (1983), Goonda (1984), Challenge (1984), Donga (1985), Rakshasudu (1986), Pasivadi Pranam (1987), Donga Mogudu (1987), Athaku Yamudu Ammayiki Mogudu (1989), Kondaveeti Donga (1990), and Muta Mestri (1993). In 2013 he received the B. N. Reddy National Film Award for Life Time Achievement.

== Personal life ==
Reddy was born on July 1, 1950, to Venku Reddy and Ramanamma in Mypadu, a small beach town near Nellore . He is from an agricultural family. Reddy is married to Bharathi. Their elder son, Sunil Reddy, is a businessman-turned-actor in Tamil cinema. He made his film debut, in Seethakaathi (2018), in which he played a negative role. He directed the 2007 film, Godava, under his home production, to launch his second son, Vaibhav Reddy.

Reddy made around 94 movies and almost 90% of them were successful. He was also one of the foremost directors, who introduced Ilaiyaraaja to give music for big budget films, in Telugu cinema. His films: Abhilasha, Challenge, Kirathakudu, Rakshasudu, and Kondaveeti Donga were big musical hits of the Chiranjeevi-Reddy-Ilaiyaraaja-Yandamuri Veerendranath combination. He was primarily responsible for Chiranjeevi's Supreme Hero and Mega Star monikers, which started with Khaidi, that released just a few months after Abhilasha, in 1983. Afterwards, he went on to make several blockbusters with Chiranjeevi. The pair earned great reputation with action and thriller films in Telugu cinema.

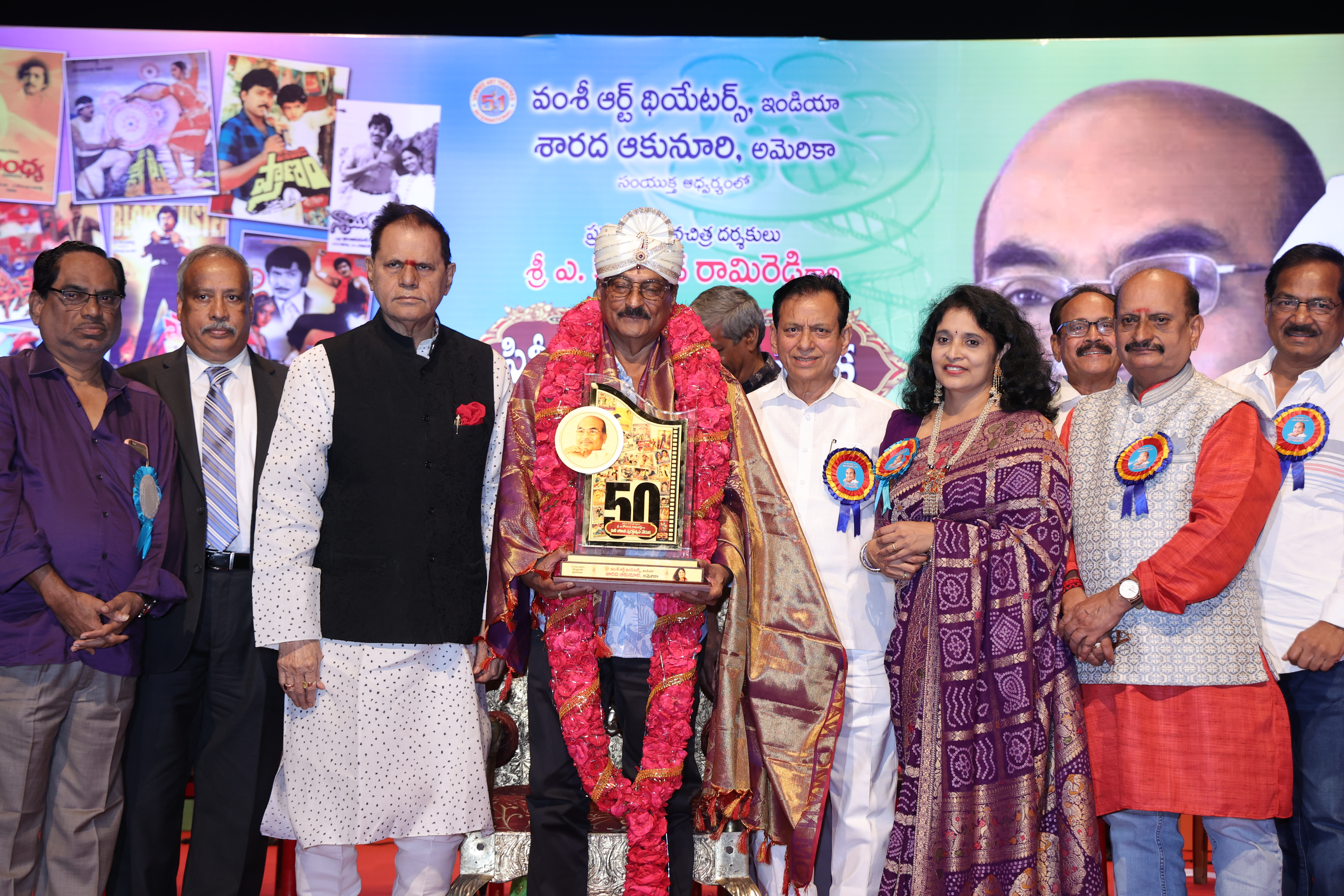
Celebrating 50 years of Cinematic excellence of great director Sri A. Kodandarami Reddy organized by Singer Sarada Akunuri along with Vamsee art theaters.

In 2023, US based Singer Sarada Akunuri organized a concert on the occasion of 50 years of cinematic excellence of the great director Sri A. Kodandarami Reddy along with Vamsee Art theaters in Hyderabad. Director B.Gopal, Director Relangi Narasimharao, Sri.T. Subbiramir eddy, Raasi movies Narasimharao, director S.Gopal and many more graced the event.

== Filmography ==
=== As director ===
Year	Film	Notes
1980	Sandhya	
1981	Kodeeswaran Magal	Tamil film; Remake of Gopal Rao Gari Ammayi
1981	Nyayam Kavali	
1981	Kirayi Rowdylu	
1982	Gopala Krishnudu	
1982	Goa	
1982	Pralaya Rudrudu	
1982	Prema Moortulu	
1983	Kirayi Kotigadu	
1983	Abhilasha	Based on Yandamuri Veerendranath's novel, with the same name
1983	Khaidi	Inspired by First Blood
1983	Prema Pichollu	
1983	Ramarajyamlo Bheemaraju	
1983	Sri Ranga Neethulu	
1983	Sivudu Sivudu Sivudu	
1984	Anubandham	
1984	Bava Maradallu	
1984	Challenge	Based on Yandamuri Veerendranath's novel, Dabbu to the Power of Dabbu
1984	Goonda	
1984	Illalu Priyuralu	
1984	Kanchu Kagada	
1984	Kodetrachu	
1984	Mr. Vijay	
1984	Rustum	
1985	Dampatyam	
1985	Donga	
1985	Maha Sangramam	
1985	Palnati Simham	
1985	Rakta Sindhuram	Based on Yandamuri Veerendranath's novel, with the same name
1985	Vijetha	
1986	Kirathakudu	Remake of Escape from New York
1986	Anasuyamma Gari Alludu	
1986	Khaidi Rudraiah	
1986	Oka Radha Iddaru Krishnulu	Based on Yandamuri Veerendranath's novel, with the same name
1986	Rakshasudu	Based on Yandamuri Veerendranath's novel, with the same name
1986	Shravana Sandhya	
1986	Veta	
1987	Bhanumati Gari Mogudu	
1987	Bhargava Ramudu	Based on Kommanaapalli Ganapati Rao's novel, Bhargava Nadam
1987	Donga Mogudu	Based on Yandamuri Veerendranath's novel, Nallanchu Tella Cheera
1987	Jebu Donga	
1987	Kartika Pournami	
1987	Pasivadi Pranam	Remake of Poovinnu Puthiya Poonthennal
1987	Sardar Krishnama Nayudu	
1987	Kirayi Dada	
1987	Maarana Homam	
1988	Bazaar Rowdy	
1988	Marana Mrudangam	Based on Yandamuri Veerendranath's novel, with the same name
1988	Raktabhishekam	Based on Yandamuri Veerendranath's novel, with the same name
1988	Tiragabadda Telugubidda	
1988	Trinetrudu	
1989	Athaku Yamudu Ammayiki Mogudu	
1989	Bhale Donga	
1989	Vicky Daada	
1990	Kondaveeti Donga	
1990	Rowdyism Nashinchali	Remake of Kireedam
1990	Jamai Raja	Hindi film; Remake of Athaku Yamudu Ammayiki Mogudu
1990	Iddaru Iddare	
1990	Nari Nari Naduma Murari	
1991	Surya IPS	
1992	Dharma Kshetram	
1992	Moratodu Naa Mogudu	Remake of En Rasavin Manasile
1992	President Gari Pellam	
1993	Nippu Ravva	
1993	Chittemma Mogudu	Remake of Thalattu Ketkuthamma
1993	Muta Mestri	
1993	Allari Alludu	
1994	Punya Bhoomi Naa Desam	Remake of Krantiveer
1994	Bobbili Simham	
1995	Pokiri Raja	Remake of Aankhen
1995	Maato Pettukoku	
1996	Jabilamma Pelli	
1996	Ramudochadu	
1997	Priyaragalu	Remake of Pappayude Swantham Appoos
1997	Muddula Mogudu	
1998	Rana	
2001	Premakke Sai	Kannada film; Remake of Chiru Navvutho
2002	Tappu Chesi Pappu Koodu	Remake of Kakkakuyil
2002	Okato Number Kurraadu	
2007	Godava	
2009	Punnami Naagu	

=== As producer ===
Year	Film	Notes
2007	Godava	
2009	Kasko	
