= Yandamuri Veerendranath =

Indian novelist and screenwriter

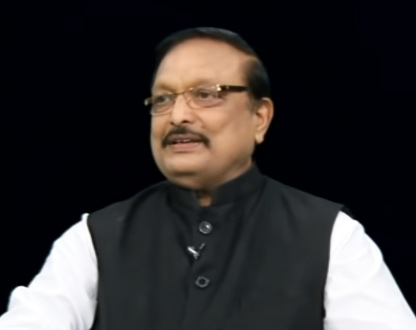
- Yandamuri Veerendranath in 2017
- Born: 14 November 1948 (age 77); Razole, Andhra Pradesh, India
- Occupation: Novelist
- Writing career
- Period: 1970–till date
- Genres: Thriller, playwright, novelist, film director

Yandamuri Veerendranath is an Indian novelist and screenwriter known for his works in the Telugu language. He influences younger generations with his socially relevant writings and YouTube videos. In his writings he addresses many of social problems in India like poverty, prejudices, and superstitions, and encourages people to be socially responsible. He successfully bridges the idealistic and the popular styles of literature. He is also a Chartered Accountant by qualification.

== Personal life ==
Yandamuri Veerendranath is from East Godavari district of Andhra Pradesh. He is a practicing chartered accountant. He worked for 15 years in various financial institutions as a senior executive.

He is an acclaimed novelist, playwright, and State Sahitya Academy award winner. His works have been translated into Tamil, Kannada, Malayalam, English, and Hindi. He is a motivational speaker and has delivered speeches in Australia, Tanzania, Indonesia, Singapore, US and the UK.

He has also directed films with Chiranjeevi, and Ramya Krishna. He is associated with more than 30 films that include 'Abhilasha' (అభిలాష) which was plagiarized from Fritz Lang’s film ‘Beyond a Reasonable Doubt’ written by Douglas Morrow (in 1956), 'Challenge' (ఛాలెంజ్) and ‘Jagadeka Veerudu Athiloka Sundari’ (జగదేక వీరుడు అతిలోక సుందరి). One of his popular novels, Tulasi Dalam, was first adapted into a Kannada movie (1985) titled Thulasidala and later in Telugu as Tulasidalam (1989), in Hindi as Phoonk (2008) and its remake in Telugu as Raksha (2008). His TV serials won Golden Nandi awards for best direction and production. His film, 'Oka Voori Katha’ (ఒక ఊరి కథ) won best regional film award from President of India. His film Vennelloa Aadapilla (వెన్నెల్లో ఆడపిల్ల) won the Filmfare award.

In an opinion poll in 1982 conducted by Andhrajyoti, he was among the "4 most popular persons" of the state, one of them being N.T. Ramarao. His book 'Success in Five Steps' holds an all-time record in Telugu literature, surpassing sales of more than two crore rupees.

He built an ashram in Kakinada, a one-crore rupee project to teach the importance of education to tribal students free of cost.

== Popular culture ==
Many of his novels have been made into motion pictures in Telugu. He also directed two movies in Telugu, the first being Agni Pravesam, starring Yamuna, and the second movie with Chiranjeevi by name, Stuvartpuram Police Station. Both the stories were based on his own novels but not received well by the audience. Hence, Veerendranath reverted to writing. His TV serials won Nandi awards, and film fare award. His film Beladingala Baale (Kannada - ಬೆಳದಿಂಗಳ ಬಾಲೆ) won Karnataka state best film award:

== Awards ==
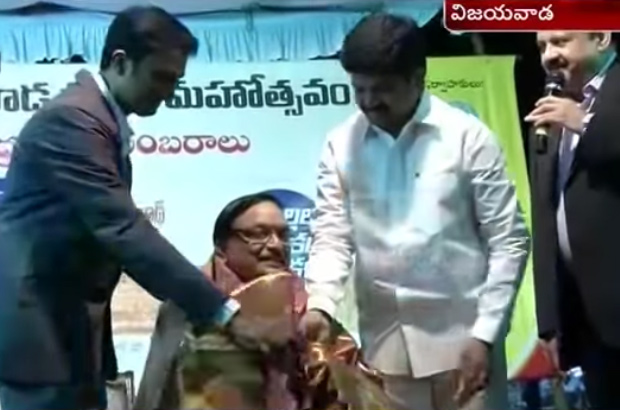
Yandamuri Veerendranath being felicitated in Vijayawada, in 2018

In addition to financial success, he has won many awards for his work. His first film as a dialogue writer won him the best regional award from the President of India.

- State Sahitya Academy Award for Raghupati Raghava Rajaram in 1982.
- Nandi Award as Best Director for the teleserial Vennello Adapilla in 1996.
- Nandi Award as Best Socially Relevant Tele-Film for Vijayam Vaipu Payanam in 2002.

== Bibliography ==
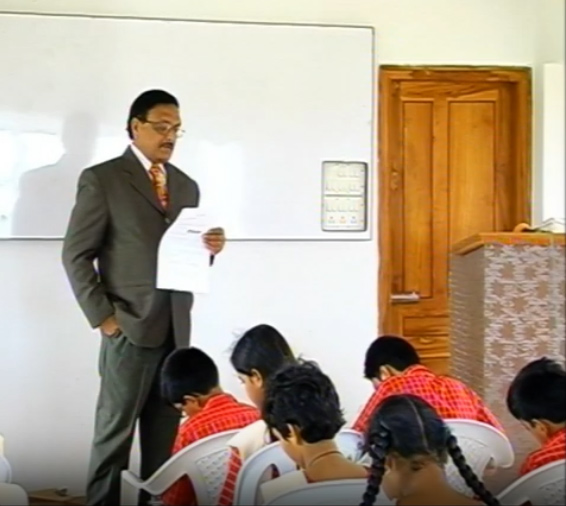
Yandamuri Veerendranath in a teaching session with children

He is passionate about motivating students and gave around 1000 motivational speeches all over India and abroad. He has also been involved in motivating around 40,000 financially poor SC & ST students all over Andhra Pradesh at 13 District headquarters.

=== Fiction ===
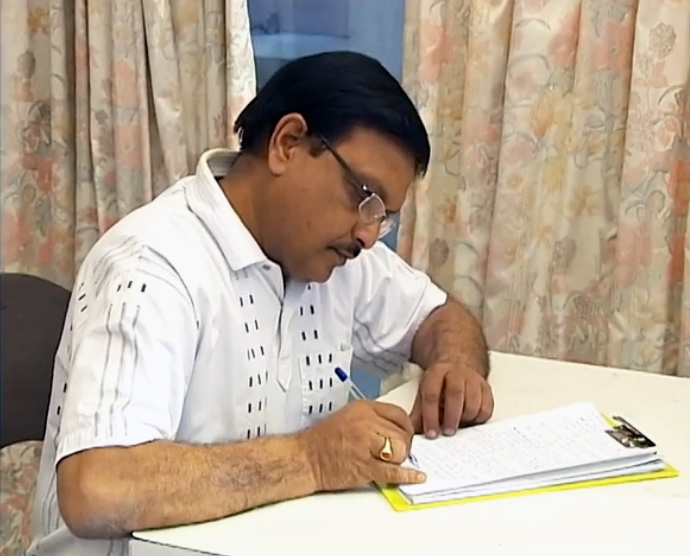
Yandamuri Veerendranath, writing a novel

- Dega Rekkala Chappudu
- Veellani Em Chedham?
- Rendu Gundela Chappudu
- Oka Varshakalapu Sayantram
- Siggesthondhi
- Ankitham
- Maro Hiroshima
- Prema
- Anaithikam
- Dhyeyam
- The Dairy of Miss Sharadha
- Priyuralu Piliche
- Vennello Aadapilla
- Manchu Parvatham
- Bharya Gunavathi Shathru
- Nallanchu Thellacheera
- Swara Bhethalam
- Sampoorna Premayanam
- Kaasanova 99
- Antharmukham
- Dabbu Minus Dabbu
- Stuvartpuram Police Station
- Cheekatlo Suryudu
- Dabbu to the Power of Dabbu
- Anando Brahmma
- Ashtavakra
- Chengalva Poodhanda
- Dhuppatlo Minnagu
- Yugantham
- Rushi
- Nishabdham - Neeku Naku Madhya
- Tulasi Dalam
- Thulasi
- Athade Aame Sainyam
- 13-14-15
- Athadu Aame Priyudu
- Ladies Hostel
- Agni Pravesham
- Rudhranetra
- Rakshasudu
- Aakhari Poratam
- Marana Mrudhangam
- Prardhana - plagiarised from Fever by Robin Cook
- Abhilasha - plagiarised from Fritz Lang’s film ‘Beyond a Reasonable Doubt’ written by Douglas Morrow
- Raktha Sindhuram
- Thriller
- Vennello Godhari
- Parnashala
- Oka Raadha Idharu Krishnulu
- Best of Veerendranath (Kathalu)
- Radha Kunthi
- Kshaminchu Supriya!

=== Non-fiction ===
- Popular Rachanalu Cheyatam Ela!?
- Manchi Muthyalu
- Padamati Koyila Pallavi
- Graphology
- Mimmalni Mee Pillalu Preminchalante
- Meeru Manchi Ammayi Kaadu
- Mimmalni Meeru Gelavagalaru
- Vijayam Vaipu Payanam
- Pillala Perla Prapancham
- Chaduvu – Ekagratha
- Vijayamlo Bhagaswamyam
- Mind Power – No.1 Avatam Ela?
- Vijayaniki 5 Metlu (English translation: The 5 Steps to Success)
- Vijayaniki Aro Mettu
- Tappu Cheddaam Randi
- Vijaya Rahasyaalu
- Manchu Poola Varsham
- Idli Orchid Aakaasham
- Bethala Prasnalu
- The Art of Studying

== Filmography ==
=== Films ===
- Oka Oori Katha (1977)
- Manchu Pallaki (1982)
- Abhilasha (1983)
- Sampoorna Premayanam (1984)
- Challenge (1984)
- Donga (1985)
- Kashmora (1986)
- Rakshasudu (1986)
- Oka Radha Iddaru Krishnulu (1986)
- Donga Mogudu (1987)
- Marana Mrudangam (1988)
- Raktabhishekam (1988)
- Aakhari Poratam (1988)
- Muthyamantha Muddu (1989)
- Jagadeka Veerudu Athiloka Sundari (1990)
- Stuartpuram Police Station (1991)
- Beladingala Baale (1995) - Kannada film
- Punnami Naagu (2009)
- Shakti (2011)
- Bunny n Cherry (2013)

=== Novels adapted into films ===
Book	Film	Notes
Rakshasudu	Rakshasudu	
Tulasi Dalam	Thulasidalam (Kannada)	
Nallanchu Tellachira	Donga Mogudu	
Abhilasha	Abhilasha	
Dabbu to the power of Dabbu	Challenge	
Rakta Sindhuram	Rakta Sindhuram	
Marana Mrudangam	Marana Mrudangam	
Raktabhishekam	Raktabhishekam	
Aakhari Poratam	Aakhari Poratam	
Vennello Aadapilla	Hello I Love you (Telugu), Beladingala Baale (Kannada)	
Thulasi	Kashmora	
Thriller	Muthyamantha Muddu	
Athadu Aame Priyudu	Sirichandana (Kannada)	

== Career ==
Veerendranath did Chartered Accountancy and started his career at Andhra Pradesh State Finance Corporation. He worked there for 5 years. Later he moved to Andhra Bank and worked as the head of Small Scale Industries Division. Some of his works are available as e-books

== See also ==
- List of Indian writers
