= P. J. Sarma =

Indian actor and writer

- Born: Pudipeddi Jogeswara Sarma; Kallepalli Rega, Vizianagaram district, Madras Presidency, British India (now in Andhra Pradesh, India)
- Died: 14 December 2014 (aged 81); Hyderabad, Telangana, India
- Occupations: Actor, writer
- Years active: 1968-2014
- Spouse: Shirisha
- Children: 5 including P. Sai Kumar; P. Ravi Shankar; Ayyappa P. Sharma
- Relatives: Aadi (grandson)

Pudipeddi Jogeswara Sarma was an Indian film dubbing artist, turned actor and writer, known for his works predominantly in Telugu cinema. He worked in over 500 films as an actor and dubbing artist. He was the father of actors P. Sai Kumar, P. Ravi Shankar and Ayyappa P. Sharma.

He died on 14 December 2014 of a heart attack at the age of 81.

== Selected filmography ==
- 1968 Bhale Monagadu
- 1969 Ukku Pidugu as Mahamanthri of Kalinga
- 1971 Sampoorna Ramayanam
- 1971 Kathanayakuralu as Lawyer
- 1971 Mattilo Manikyam as Father of Lakshmi's best friend
- 1972 Bala Bharatam
- 1972 Collector Janaki
- 1973 Devudamma as Nagabhushanam
- 1975 Zamindarugari Ammayi as Ramanatham
- 1975 Sri Ramanjaneya Yuddham
- 1976 Bhale Dongalu as Public Prosecutor
- 1976 Mahakavi Kshetrayya
- 1976 Bangaru Manishi
- 1977 Kurukshetram
- 1977 Daana Veera Soora Karna
- 1977 Indradhanusu
- 1977 Dongalaku Donga as David
- 1978 Indradhanussu as Govindu, Shanti's (Sarada) father
- 1978 Malle Poovu
- 1978 Dongala Veta as One of the Board Members
- 1978 Sahasavanthudu as Inspector General of Police
- 1978 Agent Gopi as Latha's confidante
- 1979 Hema Hemeelu
- 1979 Cheyyethi Jai Kottu as Shankaram
- 1980 Sivamethina Satyam as Public Prosecutor
- 1980 Mahalakshmi as Doctor
- 1980 Prema Tarangalu
- 1980 Ram Robert Rahim
- 1980 Love in Singapore as S.I. Krishna Rao
- 1980 Venkateswara Vratha Mahatyam aa Ramanandulu
- 1981 Nyayam Kavali
- 1981 Chattaniki Kallu Levu as Jailer Ananda Rao
- 1982 Kaliyuga Ramudu
- 1982 Naa Desam
- 1982 Kalahala Kapuram as Rammurthy
- 1982 Talliprema
- 1982 Bangaru Kanuka
- 1982 Pratigna as Ramaiah
- 1983 Shakthi
- 1983 Police Venkataswamy
- 1983 Neti Bharatam
- 1983 Abhilasha
- 1983 Gudachari No.1 as Dr. Raghunath
- 1983 Khaidi
- 1984 Kode Trachu as Family Lawyer
- 1984 Kondaveeti Nagulu as Police Officer trying to capture Nagulu
- 1984 Daku as I.G. Rama Rao
- 1984 Jagan as Judge
- 1984 Danavudu
- 1984 Janani Janmabhoomi
- 1984 Devanthakudu as Judge
- 1984 Chadarangam as Inspector General of Police
- 1984 Bobbili Brahmanna as Punnaiah
- 1985 Chattamtho Poratam as Lecturer
- 1985 Garjana as Ranga Rao
- 1985 Erramallelu
- 1985 Mugguru Mitrulu
- 1985 Pattabhishekam
- 1985 Adavi Donga
- 1985 Pachani Kapuram as Murthy
- 1985 Aggiraju
- 1985 Palnati Simham
- 1985 Raktha Sindhuram as Inspector General of Police
- 1985 Vijetha
- 1986 Ide Naa Samadhanam as Inspector General of Police
- 1986 Nireekshana
- 1986 Kashmora as Priest
- 1986 Tandra Paparayudu
- 1986 Kondaveeti Raja as Public Prosecutor
- 1986 Ugra Narasimham
- 1986 Oka Radha Iddaru Krishnulu
- 1986 Jailu Pakshi
- 1986 Punyasthree
- 1986 Aranyakanda
- 1987 Gowthami
- 1987 Pasivadi Pranam
- 1987 Bhanumathi Gari Mogudu
- 1987 Aadade Aadharam
- 1987 Daada
- 1987 Sahasa Samrat
- 1987 Marana Samsanam
- 1987 Allari Krishnayya
- 1987 Sankharavam
- 1987 Ida Prapancham
- 1988 Kaliyuga Karnudu as Judge
- 1988 Aswaddhama as Judge
- 1988 Jhansi Rani
- 1988 Aanimuthyam
- 1988 Ugranethrudu as CBI Officer Sarma
- 1988 Nyayam Kosam as CBI Chief
- 1988 Bazaar Rowdy
- 1988 Sri Saila Bramarambika Kataksham
- 1988 Inspector Pratap
- 1988 Khaidi No. 786
- 1988 Rowdy No.1
- 1989 Chennapatnam Chinnollu as Police Inspector
- 1989 Ontari Poratam
- 1989 Prema
- 1989 State Rowdy
- 1989 Black Tiger
- 1989 Neram Nadi Kaadu
- 1989 Balipeetam Pai Bharatha Nari
- 1989 Two Town Rowdy
- 1989 Yamapasam
- 1990 Jagadeka Veerudu Athiloka Sundari
- 1990 Karthavyam
- 1990 Kaliyuga Abhimanyudu as Collector
- 1991 Brahmarishi Vishwamitra
- 1991 Maanagara Kaaval (Tamil)
- 1991 Shanti Kranti
- 1991 Nayakuralu
- 1991 Tholi Puddu
- 1991 Chaitanya
- 1992 Asadhyulu
- 1992 Nani
- 1992 Samarpana
- 1993 Sarigamalu
- 1994 Mugguru Monagallu
- 1994 Hero (Tamil)
- 1995 Leader
- 1996 Maavichiguru
- 1996 Sampradayam as Diwan
- 1996 Hello Guru
- 1996 Shri Krishnarjuna Vijayam
- 1997 Rowdy Durbar
- 1997 Aahwanam
- 1998 Tholi Prema
- 1998 Padutha Theeyaga
- 1998 Kante Koothurne Kanu
- 1998 Eshwar Alla
- 1998 Kodukulu
- 1998 Choodalani Vundi
- 2001 Athanu
- 2001 Khaki Chokka
- 2003 Naaga
- 2004 Seshadri Naidu

== Awards ==
Nandi Awards
Filmfare Awards South
