= Lahari Music =

Indian music company

- Trade name: Lahari Recording Company
- Type: Public
- Industry: Music, Entertainment
- Genre: Various
- Founded: 1974; 52 years ago in Bangalore, Karnataka, India
- Headquarters: Bangalore, Karnataka, India
- Website: www.laharimusic.com

Lahari Music is an Indian music company based in Bangalore. It consists of a music label, called "Lahari Recording Company", and a film production corporate called "Lahari Films LLP".

== History ==
The company was established in 1974 by Manohar Naidu. The music label Lahari Music primarily produces film songs, but to a lesser extent also produces sugam sangeetha, folk, classical, and devotional albums.

In 2015, Lahari made a deal with music distributor T-Series which allowed T-Series to take over the role of marketing Lahari Music's catalogue on YouTube and television. Lahari Music continues to operate in music acquisition, content streaming, and radio.

== Filmography ==
=== Kannada ===
Year	Film	Music
1985	Asambhava	Shankar–Ganesh
1985	Nee Thanda Kanike	Vijaya Anand
1986	Africadalli Sheela	Bappi Lahiri
1986	Ee Jeeva Ninagagi	Vijaya Anand
1986	Premaloka	Hamsalekha
1987	Ranadheera	Hamsaleka
1987	Avale Nanna Hendthi	Hamsaleka
1987	Jayasimha	Vijaya Anand
1987	Krishna Rukmini	K. V. Madhadevan
1987	Sangliyana	Hamsaleka
1987	Brahma Vishnu Maheshwara	Vijaya Anand
1987	Mister Raja	Hamsaleka
1987	Digvijaya	Hamsaleka
1987	Shubha Milana	M. Ranga Rao
1987	Sundara Swapnagalu	Vijayabhaskar
1988	Anjada Gandu	Hamsaleka
1988	Yuddha Kaanda	Hamsaleka
1988	Devatha Manushya	Upendra Kumar
1988	Dance Raja Dance	Vijaya Anand
1988	Mana Mechchida Hudugi	Upendra Kumar
1988	Ranaranga	Hamsaleka
1988	Chiranjeevi Sudhakar	Upendra Kumar
1988	Elu Suttina Kote	L. Vaidyanathan
1988	Samyuktha	Singeetham Srinivasa Rao
1988	Ramanna Shamanna	S. P. Balasubrahmanyam
1989	Yuga Purusha	Hamsaleka
1989	Bannada Gejje	Hamsaleka
1989	Kindari Jogi	Hamsaleka
1989	C. B. I. Shankar	Hamsaleka
1989	Indrajith	Hamsaleka
1989	Muthina Haara	Hamsaleka
1989	Krishna Nee Kunidaga	Vijaya Anand
1989	Punda Prachanda	Hamsaleka
1990	Shruthi	S. A. Rajakumar
1990	Shanti Kranti	Hamsaleka
1990	Hosa Jeevana	Hamsaleka
1990	S.P.Sangliyanna - 2	Hamsaleka
1990	Ashwamedha	Sangeetha Raja
1990	Kempu Gulaabi	Hamsaleka
1990	Mallige Hoove	Hamsaleka
1990	Policeana Hendthi	M. Ranga Rao
1990	Rani Maharani	Hamsaleka
1990	Mathe Haditu Kogile	Rajan–Nagendra
1990	Prathap	Hamsaleka
1990	Nammoora Hammera	Hamsaleka
1991	Sundarakanda	Sangeetha Raja
1991	Belli Kalungura	Hamsaleka
1991	Ramachaari	Hamsaleka
1991	Malashree Mamashree	Raj–Koti
1991	Rowdy MLA	Hamsaleka
1991	Kitturina Huli	Upendra Kumar
1991	Neenu Nakkare Haalu Sakkare	Hamsaleka
1991	Kollura Kaala	Upendra Kumar
1991	Navathaare	Hamsaleka
1991	Gruha Pravesha	Upendra Kumar
1991	Ebbaru Hendira Muddina Police	Raj–Koti
1991	Ajagajaanthara	Hamsaleka
1992	Chaitrada Premanjali	Hamsaleka
1992	Muddina Maava	S. P. Balasubrahmanyam
1992	Solillada Saradara	Hamsaleka
1992	Chaitrada Premanjali	Hamsalekha
1992	Gandharva	Hamsaleka
1993	Baa Nalle Madhuchandrake	Hamsaleka
1993	Hoovu Hannu	Hamsaleka
1993	Rayaru Bandaru Mavana Manege	Raj–Koti
1993	Kaadambari	Hamsaleka
1993	Mannina Doni	Hamsalekha
1993	Gejje Naada	V. Manohar
1994	Bevubella	Hamsalekha
1994	Meghamaale	Hamsalekha
1994	Mahakshathriya	Hamsaleka
1994	Gandhada Gudi Part 2	Rajan–Nagendra
1994	Samraat	Hamsaleka
1995	Nammoora Mandara Hoove	Ilayaraja
1995	Beladingala Baale	Gunasingh
1995	Himapatha	Hamsaleka
1995	Mojugara Sogasugara	Hamsaleka
1995	Ganeshana Galate	Rajan–Nagendra
1995	Hendathi Endare Heegirabeku	Kashinath
1996	Amruthavarshini	Deva
1996	Ee Hrudaya Ninagaagi	V. Manohar
1996	Ganga Yamuna	Vidyasagar
1996	Rangena Halliyage Rangada Rangegowda	V. Manohar
1996	Gulabi	Ilayaraja
1996	Thayavva	V. Manohar
1997	A	Gurukiran
1997	Andaman	Hamsaleka
1997	Simhada Mari	Hamsaleka
1997	Prema Raga Haadu Gelathi	Ilayaraja
1998	Veerappa Nayaka	Rajesh Ramanath
1998	Gadibidi Krishna	Hamsaleka
1999	Chandramukhi Pranasakhi	K. Kalyan
2010	Porki	V. Harikrishna
2012	Prasad	Ilaiyaraaja
2014	KA	R. S. Ganesh Narayanan
2014	Aryan	Jassie Gift
2014	Power	S. Thaman
2014	Mandya Star	Manoj.S
2015	Wow Murugesh	Manoj.S
2015	Killing Veerappan	Ravishankar
2015	Apoorva	V. Ravichandran
2015	Rangitaranga	Anup Bhandari
2016	Viraat	V. Harikrishna
2016	Sundaranga Jaana	B. Ajaneesh Lokanath
2016	Jaguar	S. Thaman
2016	Santhu Straight Forward	V. Harikrishna
2017	Tiger	Arjun Janya
2017	Saheba	V. Harikrishna
2017	Bangara s/o Bangarada Manushya	V. Harikrishna
2017	Jani	Jassie Gift
2018	Janumada snehitharu	A raj kumar
2018	Kolar	Arya Mahesh
2018	K.G.F: Chapter 1	Ravi Basrur
2019	Natasaarvabhowma	D. Imman
2019	Kurukshetra	V. Harikrishna
2020	Khaki	
2022	K.G.F: Chapter 2	Ravi Basrur
2022	Martin	Mani Sharma
2022	Kshamisi Nimma Khaatheyalli Hanavilla	Prajwal Pai
2023	Long Drive	Vikas Vassishta
2026	Graamaayana	Poornachandra Tejaswi

=== Malayalam ===
Year	Film	Music
2019	Mamangam	M. Jayachandran

=== Telugu ===
Year	Film	Music
1987	Majnu	Laxmikant–Pyarelal
1987	Premalokam	Hamsalekha
1987	Swayamkrushi	Ramesh Naidu
1987	Chakravarthy	K. Chakravarthy
1987	Srinivasa Kalyanam	K. V. Mahadevan
1987	Trimurtulu	Bappi Lahiri
1988	Muthyamantha Muddu	Hamsalekha
1988	Brahmarshi Vishwamitra	Ravindra Jain
1989	Vichitra Sodarulu	Ilaiyaraaja
1990	Lorry Driver	K. Chakravarthy
1990	Muddula Menalludu	K. V. Mahadevan
1990	Nari Nari Naduma Murari	K. V. Mahadevan
1990	Shanti Kranti	Hamsalekha
1991	Gang Leader	Bappi Lahiri
1991	Rowdy Alludu	Bappi Lahiri
1991	Jaitra Yatra	S. P. Balasubrahmanyam
1992	Rowdy Inspector	Bappi Lahiri
1992	Donga Police	Bappi Lahiri
1992	Gharana Mogudu	M M Keeravani
1992	Roja (Dubbed version)	A R Rahman
1992	Chinna Rayudu	Ilaiyaraaja
1992	Sundarakanda	M. M. Keeravani
1992	Peddarikam	Raj–Koti
1992	Chamanthi (Dubbed version)	Ilaiyaraaja
1992	Aapathbandavudu	M M Keeravani
1993	Mugguru Monagallu	Vidyasagar
1993	Mechanic Alludu	Raj–Koti
1993	Gentleman (Dubbed version)	A R Rahman
1994	Indhu	Deva
1994	Nippu Ravva	Raj–Koti
1994	Aswamedham	Ilayaraja
1994	Abbayigaru	M M Keeravani
1994	Brahma	Bappi Lahiri
1995	Antham	R. D. Burman
1995	Gaayam	Sri Kommineni
1995	Nippu Ravva	Bappi Lahiri
1995	Allari Alludu	MM Keeravani
1995	Seetharathnam Gari Abbayi	Raj–Koti
1995	Muta Mestri	Raj–Koti
1995	Rowdy Gaari Pellam	Bappi Lahiri
1995	Bangaru Bullodu	Raj–Koti
1995	Kondapalli Raja	M M Keeravani
1995	Seetharamaiahgari Manavaralu	M M Keeravani
1995	Pokiri Raja	Raj–Koti
1995	Kshana Kshanam	M M Keeravani
1995	Premikudu (Dubbed version)	A R Rahman
1995	Money	Sri
1995	Indira (Dubbed version)	A R Rahman
1995	Orey Rikshaw	Vandemataram Srinivas
1995	Allari Mogudu	M M Keeravani
1996	Bombay Priyudu	M M Keeravani
1996	Pelli Sandadi	M M Keeravani
1996	Hitler	Koti
1996	Mr. Romeo (Dubbed version)	A R Rahman
1996	Akkada Ammayi Ikkada Abbayi	Koti
1997	Gokulamlo Seetha	Koti
1997	Master	Deva
1998	Tholi Prema	Deva
1998	Sriramulayya	Vandemataram Srinivas
1999	Hallo My Dear Monishaa (Dubbed version)	T. Rajendar
2009	Vengamamba	M M Keeravani
2009	Billa	Mani Sharma
2009	Magadheera ("Bangaru Kodipetta (Remix)")	M M Keeravani
2013	1:Nenokkadine	Devi Sri Prasad
2014	Legend	Devi Sri Prasad
2014	Race Gurram	Thaman
2014	Premalo ABC	Yelendar
2014	Aagadu	Thaman
2014	Joru	Sai Karthik
2015	Gopala Gopala	Anup Rubens
2015	Yevade Subramanyam	Radhan
2015	Dohchay	Sunny M.R.
2015	Rudramadevi	Ilaiyaraaja
2015	Bhale Bhale Magadivoy	Gopi Sunder
2015	Lion	Mani Sharma
2015	Asura	Sai Karthik
2015	Baahubali: The Beginning	M.M. Keeravani
2015	Akhil	Anup Rubens; Thaman
2015	Size Zero	M. M. Keeravani
2016	Krishna Gaadi Veera Prema Gaadha	Vishal Chandrasekhar
2016	Sarrainodu	Thaman
2016	Chuttalabbayi	Thaman
2016	Parvathipuram	Shayak Parvez
2016	Majnu	Gopi Sunder
2016	Attack	Ravi Shankar
2016	Guntur Talkies	Sricharan Pakala
2016	Srirastu Subhamastu	Thaman
2016	Jaguar	Thaman
2016	Hyper	Ghibran
2016	Janatha Garage	Devi Sri Prasad
2017	Khaidi No. 150	Devi Sri Prasad
2017	Gautamiputra Satakarni	Chirantan Bhatt
2017	Baahubali 2: The Conclusion	M. M. Keeravani
2017	Guru	Santhosh Narayanan
2017	Om Namo Venkatesaya	M. M. Keeravani
2017	Veedevadu	Thaman
2017	Poraatam	Harish-Sathish
2017	Agent Bhairavaa (Dubbed version)	Santhosh Narayanan
2018	Rangasthalam	Devi Sri Prasad
2018	Bharat Ane Nenu	Devi Sri Prasad
2018	Krishnarjuna Yudham	Hip Hop Tamizha
2018	Savyasachi	M. M. Keeravani
2018	Amar Akbar Antony	S. Thaman
2019	Vinaya Vidheya Rama	Devi Sri Prasad
2019	Sita	Anup Rubens
2019	Dear Comrade	Justin Prabhakaran
2019	Arjun Suravaram	Sam C. S.
2019	Sye Raa Narasimha Reddy	Amit Trivedi
2019	Prati Roju Pandage	S. Thaman
2020	Sarileru Neekevvaru	Devi Sri Prasad
2020	Disco Raja	S. Thaman
2020	30 Rojullo Preminchadam Ela	Anup Rubens
2020	Red	Mani Sharma
2021	Jathi Ratnalu	Radhan
2021	SR Kalyanamandapam	Chaitan Bharadwaj
2021	Akhanda	Thaman S
2021	Shukra	Ashirvad Luke
2022	RRR	M. M. Keeravani
2023	Writer Padmabhushan	Kalyan Nayak, Shekar Chandra
2023	Agent	Hiphop Tamizha
2024	Pailam Pilaga	Yashwanth Nag
2025	Baahubali: The Epic	M M Keeravani

=== Tamil ===
Year	Film	Music
1986	Naan Adimai Illai	Vijay Anand
1986	Enga Chinna Rasa	Shankar–Ganesh
1986	Kaagida Odam	Shankar–Ganesh
1986	Kaalaiyum Neeye Maalaiyum Neeye	Devendran
1986	Paruvaragam	Hamsalekha
1987	Annanagar Mudhal Theru	Chandrabose
1987	Cooliekkaran	T. Rajendar
1987	Kodi Parakuthu	Hamsalekha
1987	Makkal Aanai Ittal	S. A. Rajkumar
1987	Oorkavalan	Shankar–Ganesh
1987	Ullathil Nalla Ullam	Gangai Amaran
1987	Vedham Pudhithu	Devendran
1987	Veedu Manaivi Makkal	Shankar–Ganesh
1987	Veeran Veluthambi	S. A. Rajkumar
1988	Idhu Namma Aalu	K. Bhagyaraj
1988	Jadiketha Moodi	Hamsalekha
1988	Jeeva	Gangai Amaran
1988	Kathal Geetham	Ilaiyaraaja
1988	Pudhea Padhai	Chandrabose
1988	Puthiya Vaanam	Hamsalekha
1988	Samsara Sangeetham	T. Rajendar
1988	Then Pondi Cheemayiley	K. Bhagyaraj
1988	Veeran	Hamsalekha
1988	Idhu Unga Kudumbam	Hamsalekha
1989	Aararo Aariraro	K. Bhagyaraj
1989	Chinnappadass	Ilaiyaraaja
1989	Dravidan	M. S. Viswanathan
1989	En Rathathin Rathame	Shankar–Ganesh
1989	Nila Penne	Vidyasagar
1989	Penmani Aval Kanmani	Shankar–Ganesh
1989	Rajanadai	M. S. Viswanathan
1989	Sugamana Sumaigal	M. S. Viswanathan
1990	Vazhkai Chakram	Shankar–Ganesh
1990	Avasara Police 100	K. Bhagyaraj
1991	Perum Pulli	S. A. Rajkumar
1991	Cheran Pandiyan	Soundaryan
1991	Nattukku Oru Nallavan	Hamsalekha
1991	MGR Nagaril	S. Balakrishnan
1991	Thalapathi	Ilaiyaraaja
1991	Naan Pesa Ninaipathellam	Sirpy
1991	Moondrezhuthil En Moochirukkum	Ilaiyaraaja
1991	Vasanthakala Paravai	Deva
1991	Putham Pudhu Payanam	Soundaryan
1991	Rudra	Gangai Amaran
1992	Oor Mariyadhai	Deva
1992	Suriyan	Deva
1992	Annaamalai	Deva
1992	Singaravelan	Ilaiyaraaja
1992	Roja	A. R. Rahman
1992	Captain Magal	Hamsalekha
1992	Chembaruthi	Ilaiyaraaja
1992	Meera	Ilaiyaraaja
1993	Jathi Malli	Maragathamani
1993	Gokulam	Sirpy
1993	Gentleman	A. R. Rahman
1993	Rajadurai	Deva
1994	Captain	Sirpy
1994	Chinna Madam	Sirpy
1994	Senthamizh Selvan	M. S. Viswanathan; Ilaiyaraaja
1994	Kaadhalan	A. R. Rahman
1995	Indira	A. R. Rahman
1995	Sindhoo Nadi Poo	Soundaryan
1996	Gopala Gopala	Deva
1996	Poomani	Ilaiyaraaja
1996	Puthaiyal	Vidyasagar
1996	Tamizh Selvan	Deva
1996	Ullathai Allitha	Sirpy
1996	Kadhal Desam	A. R. Rahman
2004	New	A. R. Rahman
1997	Periya Idathu Mappillai	Sirpy
2015	Sagaptham	Karthik Raja
2015	Masala Padam	Karthik Acharya
2015	Baahubali: The Beginning	Maragathamani
2015	Sakalakala Vallavan	S. Thaman
2015	Inji Iduppazhagi	Maragathamani
2016	Irudhi Suttru	Santhosh Narayanan
2016	Kalam	Prakash Nikki
2016	Idhu Namma Aalu	Kuralarasan
2016	Raja Manthiri	Justin Prabhakaran
2016	Thodari	D. Imman
2016	Bruce Lee	G. V. Prakash Kumar
2016	Ulkuthu	Justin Prabhakaran
2016	Meen Kuzhambum Mann Paanaiyum	D. Imman
2016	Anbanavan Asaradhavan Adangadhavan	Yuvan Shankar Raja
2016	Virugam	Prabhu S. R.
2016	Kadhali Kanavillai	Deva
2017	Bairavaa	Santhosh Narayanan
2017	Maragadha Naanayam	Dhibu Ninan Thomas
2017	Baahubali: The Conclusion	Maragathamani
2017	Dhayam	Sathish Selvam
2017	Yaar Ivan	S. Thaman
2018	96	Govind Vasantha
2018	Vishwaroopam II	Mohamaad Ghibran
2018	Kaatrin Mozhi	A. H. Kaashif
2019	Viswasam	D. Imman
2019	Ayogya	Sam CS
2019	Kee	Vishal Chandrasekhar
2019	Thittam Poattu Thirudura Kootam	Ashwath
2019	Capmaari	Siddharth Vipin
2019	Hero	Yuvan Shankar Raja
2019	Thambi	Govind Vasantha
2020	Pattas	Vivek-Mervin
2020	Ka Pae Ranasingam	Mohamaad Ghibran
2020	Kavalthurai Ungal Nanban	Adithyha-Soorya
2021	Laabam	D. Imman
2021	Friendship	D. M. Udhaya Kumar
2021	Devadas Parvathi	
2022	Anbarivu	Hiphop Tamizha

== Lahari Films ==
Year	Film	Language	Note
2021	Rider	Kannada	
2023	Writer Padmabhushan	Telugu	
2023	Mem Famous	Telugu	
2023	UI	Kannada	Also released in Telugu, Tamil, Malayalam & Hindi
2023	NK04	Kannada	
2024	Jimmy	Kannada	
2026	Graamaayana	Kannada	
