= Maa Bapu Bommaku Pellanta =

2003 Telugu film by Ravi Raja Pinisetty

- DVD cover
- Directed by: Ravi Raja Pinisetty
- Screenplay by: Ravi Raja Pinisetty
- Story by: Ranjith
- Dialogues by: G. Satyamurthy
- Based on: Nandanam (2002)
- Produced by: P. D. Appachan
- Starring: Ajay Raghavendra; Gayathri Raguram; Aravind Akash
- Edited by: Gowtham Raju
- Music by: Koti
- Production company: Swarga Chitra
- Distributed by: Suresh Movies
- Release date: 18 May 2003
- Country: India
- Language: Telugu

Maa Bapu Bommaku Pellanta (transl. Our Bapu doll is getting married) is a 2003 Indian Telugu-language romantic drama film directed by Ravi Raja Pinisetty and produced by P. D. Appachan under the Swarga Chitra banner. A remake of the Malayalam film Nandanam (2002), it stars debutante Ajay Raghavendra alongside Gayatri Raguram in a central role, while Aravind Akash reprised his role as Lord Krishna from Nandamam. The music for the film was composed by Koti.

== Plot ==
Mohana is a devoted maidservant in a wealthy household, known for her unwavering faith in Lord Krishna. Despite her modest status, she secretly dreams of marrying Viswam, the son of her employer. When circumstances and social norms seem to thwart her desires, Mohana's faith leads to a divine intervention that changes her life. The narrative combines spiritual elements with a romantic storyline, culminating in a union blessed by destiny.

== Cast ==
- Ajay Raghavendra as Viswam
- Gayatri Raguram as Mohana
- Aravind Akash as Krishna
- Chandra Mohan
- Sujatha
- Seetha
- M. S. Narayana
- Telangana Shakuntala
- Vizag Prasad
- Narra Venkateswara Rao
- Pavala Syamala
- Rama Prabha
- Vineeth in a cameo appearance

== Production ==
P. D. Appachan, known for producing Malayalam originals of Telugu remakes like Peddarikam (1992), and Snehamante Idera (2001), made his Telugu debut with Maa Bapu Bommaku Pellanta. The film, based on Nandanam (2002), was adapted to suit Telugu audiences. Ranjith provided the story, while Satyamurthy wrote the dialogues. Ajay Raghavendra, who made his debut as a lead actor in this film, previously portrayed the young version of Venkatesh in Chanti (1992) and Kondapalli Raja (1993).

Directed by Ravi Raja Pinisetty, the film was shot extensively in Andhra Pradesh to authentically depict the rural atmosphere. Filming was completed over 93 working days, covering talkie portions and song sequences at locations like Vizag, Razole and Borra Caves.

== Music ==
The soundtrack, composed by Koti, included six songs, blending devotional tracks and situational melodies. Lyricists Surendra Krishna and Sri Harsha wrote the lyrics.

== Reception ==
The film was released on 18 May 2003. Producer Appachan released the film on his own through Suresh Movies distributors.

A critic for Telugucinema.com wrote, "No doubt the director tried his level best to bring out a good film with nativity backdrop, he could not do it as there is nothing new in taking, story line and could not match with the present trend. Even though the screenplay part is ok the film failed to create interest". Raviraja Pinisetty felt that casting went wrong with this film.
