= Vedurupaka =

- Village
- Nickname: Bamboohut, Land of gods.
- Interactive map of Vedurupaka
- Location in Andhra Pradesh, India Vedurupaka (India)
- Coordinates: 16.894°N 82.024°E
- Country: India
- State: Andhra Pradesh
- District: East Godavari
- Established: 1698

Government
  - Body: Vedurupaka Panchayat

Population (2011)
  - Total: 17,585

Languages
  - Official: Telugu
- Time zone: UTC+5:30 (IST)
- PIN: 533 345
- Telephone code: 91-08857
- Coastline: 25 kilometres (16 mi)
- Planning agency: Vedurupaka Grama Panchayat
- Climate: Tropical (Köppen)
- Avg. annual temperature: 30.0 °C (86.0 °F)
- Avg. summer temperature: 43.12 °C (109.62 °F)
- Avg. winter temperature: 28.0 °C (82.4 °F)

Vedurupaka is a village in Rayavaram mandal, East Godavari district of Andhra Pradesh state, India.

== Geography ==
The Tulyabhaga river flows by Vedurupaka. William Wilson Hunter described it as one of the seven estuaries of the mighty Godavari River.

== Culture ==
One of the main attractions is Vijaya Durga Peetham, a place of worship of the Hindu goddess Durga. The village festival of Poleramma Jathara or Sambaram takes place each May; it is a 2-day carnival of religious fervour and traditional dances. This event was supervised by the late Sri Murthineedi Venkayya Garu for 40 years. Another festival is Dasara.

The village's Hindu temples were built by the king of Peddapuram Thimma gaja pathi maharaja in 1700 AD.

== Education ==
The first school in Vedurupaka was established by the Canadian Baptist Mission, one of the early Christian mission initiatives. It was later gifted to the Government. This village has three Government Primary Schools along with SPPR Zilla Parishath High School.

Brahmin Student financial support trust originated in this village. D Satya Prasad, Brahmanaseva trust, Vedurupaka, Rayavaram mandal.

== Notables ==
- Sri Vijaya Durga Peethathipati, a Vedic Exegete
- Reverend Professor G. Babu Rao, the first graduate of Vedurupaka, who taught Old Testament at the country's first University, the Senate of Serampore College (University) in Serampore, West Bengal
- Katcha George Victor, Ex-Member of the Andhra Pradesh Legislative Council
- G. Satyamurthy, teacher and member of the United Teachers Federation who later became a film writer, director and lyricist
- Gara Chitti Babu of the United Teachers Federation,
- S. Chandra Sekhar Reddy - Tollywood film director
- Vasu Varma - Tollywood film director
- Devi Sri Prasad (music director)
- Sagar (playback singer, TV host)
- Vijai Bulganin (music director)
