= Annaamalai =

1992 film by Suresh Krissna

- Theatrical release poster
- Directed by: Suresh Krissna
- Screenplay by: Suresh Krissna; Shanmugasundaram
- Based on: Khudgarz by Rakesh Roshan
- Produced by: Rajam Balachander; Puspha Kandasamy
- Starring: Rajinikanth; Khushbu; Sarath Babu
- Cinematography: P. S. Prakash
- Edited by: Ganesh Kumar
- Music by: Deva
- Production company: Kavithalayaa Productions
- Release date: 27 June 1992
- Running time: 164 minutes
- Country: India
- Language: Tamil

Annaamalai (also spelt Annamalai; pronounced [aɳɳaːmalaɪ]) is a 1992 Indian Tamil-language action drama film directed by Suresh Krissna and produced by Kavithalayaa Productions. A remake of the 1987 Hindi film Khudgarz, itself based on Jeffrey Archer's 1979 novel Kane and Abel, it stars Rajinikanth, Khushbu and Sarath Babu with Radha Ravi, Nizhalgal Ravi and Manorama in supporting roles. The film revolves around Annaamalai, a poor milkman, and Ashok, a wealthy hotelier, who have been friends since childhood, a friendship opposed by Ashok's father who creates a rift between the two.

Initially Visu and later Vasanth were the directors, though they opted out due to lack of creative freedom. Suresh Krissna replaced them as director, and also contributed to the screenplay while Shanmugasundaram wrote the dialogue. Principal photography began in March 1992 and the entire filming process lasted 45 working days. The music was composed by Deva and the lyrics for the songs were written by Vairamuthu. The cinematography was handled by P. S. Prakash and the editing by the duo Ganesh Kumar.

Annaamalai was released on 27 June 1992. Although its opening was threatened due to a newly established Tamil Nadu government rule where posters of films were prohibited in Madras, the lack of promos only increased the hype and worked to the film's advantage; it ran for 175 days in theatres and was the highest-grossing film in Tamil cinema to that point. It was remade in Telugu in 1993 as Kondapalli Raja and in Kannada in 2003 as Gokarna.

== Plot ==
Annaamalai is a milkman, while Ashok is the owner of a five-star hotel in Madras. They have been very close friends since childhood. Ashok's father Gangadharan never liked his son's friendship with a poor milkman. Annaamalai is kind-hearted and innocent, and falls in love with Subbulakshmi, a college girl he eventually marries. Ashok falls in love with a poor girl, Shanthi, who works as his secretary. Annaamalai arranges Ashok and Shanthi's wedding which angers Gangadharan as he thinks Shanthi lacks the status to become his daughter-in-law.

Annaamalai clashes with Ekambaram, an MLA, following which Ekambaram understands Annaamalai's good nature. Annaamalai's small house along with a small piece of empty land is situated at a prime location, to which Annaamalai held sentimental values; Gangadharan pressures Ashok to buy it so that they can construct a star hotel. Ashok is initially hesitant as he does not want to mix business and friendship, but later agrees. Annaamalai happily accepts and also agrees to give the land for free, emulating pure friendship. Ashok feels proud of Annaamalai and informs his father that Annaamalai has to be made a shareholder in the new hotel. Gangadharan agrees, but decides to cheat Annaamalai and gets his signature on empty papers.

The star hotel is constructed, and Gangadharan plans to demolish Annaamalai's house which is located next to the hotel. Gangadharan and Ashok's cousin Sargunam forge documents and take control of Annaamalai's empty land. Annaamalai learns of this plan and argues with Gangadharan. Ashok, oblivious to his father's plan, gets angry with Annaamalai for fighting with him, and demolishes Annaamalai's house which is in the memory of Annaamalai's father. In response, Annaamalai lays a challenge that he will become wealthy and take revenge on Ashok.

Ekambaram helps Annaamalai secure funds. Annaamalai starts a small sweets business and, over the course of fifteen years due to hard work and toil, becomes one of the wealthiest hoteliers in Madras; he builds a star hotel which becomes more popular than Ashok's hotel. Sargunam steals money from Ashok and knowing this, Ashok asks him to leave. Sargunam joins Annaamalai's hotel and also marries Annaamalai's sister, Kamala. Annaamalai triumphs over Ashok and becomes the president of the hotel association and Ashok faces financial troubles. When Annaamalai learns that his daughter Priya and Ashok's son Deepak love each other, he opposes this because of his hatred for Ashok.

During the public auction of a plot, Annaamalai tricks Ashok into bidding for ₹120 million (equivalent to ₹1.0 billion or US$11 million in 2026), even though it is not worth more than ₹30 million. Ashok is forced to sell his bungalow to pay for the plot and Annaamalai purchases Ashok's bungalow, but soon after he gives the registration document to his mother Sivagami and asks her to hand it over to Ashok since he did not want to punish his friend thinking about the old friendship. Ashok and Gangadharan realise their mistake and apologise to Sivagami knowing Annaamalai's kind heart. Annaamalai learns about Gangadharan and Sargunam's document forgery, and that Ashok was unaware of their plans. Sargunam later hires Don, an assassin, to kill Ashok to usurp his wealth. But Annaamalai saves Ashok, kills Don and Sargunam seeks forgiveness. Annaamalai and Ashok reconcile, and fix their children's marriage.

== Cast ==
- Rajinikanth as Annaamalai
- Khushbu as Subbulakshmi
- Sarath Babu as Ashok
- Rekha as Shanthi
- Radha Ravi as Gangadharan
- Janagaraj as Panchu
- Nizhalgal Ravi as Sargunam
- Prabhakar as Don Fernadez
- Vinu Chakravarthy as Ekambaram
- Manorama as Sivagami
- Vaishnavi as Kamala
- Karan as Deepak
- Dakshayini as Priya
- L. Muthappa as the parrot astrologer (uncredited)

== Production ==
=== Development ===
In the first week of March 1992, the newspaper Dina Thanthi announced K. Balachander's production house Kavithalayaa Productions' next film Annaamalai, with Vasanth as director and Rajinikanth as the lead actor. When the title was announced, some people had misgivings because of the saying "Annamalaikku Arohara" (Hail Hara, Lord of Annamalai) which has negative connotations; however Balachander refused to change it. After completing work on Jaagruti on 8 March, Suresh Krissna left for Madras the next morning; he had not yet signed any film. Upon arrival the same day, he was informed that Balachander, his mentor, was waiting for him. Krissna visited Balachander, who told him that Vasanth had left Annaamalai, which was scheduled to begin filming in two days and its release fixed for June. When asked if he would direct, Krissna received an advance of ₹109 (equivalent to ₹920 or US$9.80 in 2026) and accepted. Vasanth has never elaborated on why he left, saying it was only due to "personal reasons". Visu was the director before Vasanth, but due to some contradiction with Rajinikanth, he opted out.

At the time of Krissna's arrival, the script was not complete; he met the screenwriter Shanmugasundaram, who narrated the main story: the "friendship between a poor milkman and a rich man, with the former's house being a point of conflict". Krissna realised there was still much work to be done because reasons like "why does his house mean so much to him, why does the rich man's father hate this milkman, what angers the hero so much that he goes against his rich friend" had yet to be established. The story was based on the Hindi film Khudgarz (1987), which itself was based on Jeffrey Archer's novel Kane and Abel. Unlike Khudgarz, where the rich man was the main character, Rajinikanth's character, the poor man, was made the main character. When Krissna asked Shanmugasundaram about the "incomplete pockets" in the story, Shanmugasundaram replied that it could all be developed over the course of production. Shanmugasundaram had been hired at Rajinikanth's suggestion, but Balachander wrote the dialogues for a scene involving the title character and the MLA Ekambaram (Vinu Chakravarthy) at Rajinikanth's insistence. According to Krissna, "We completely went with the flow, sometimes without even knowing what scene would be canned the next day, but we were always alert".

When Krissna met Rajinikanth, he told him that there was a substantial amount of work to be done in the script, but liked the plot. Shortly before the beginning of principal photography, which was scheduled to begin on 11 March and continue its first schedule for ten days, only the main cast – Rajinikanth as Annaamalai, Khushbu as his love interest and Sarath Babu as his friend Ashok – had been finalised. Khushbu's character initially had the same name as her, but this was later changed to Subbulakshmi alias "Subbu". Since the script was not complete, there was no proper shooting schedule, and Manorama was initially unavailable. But after another film she had signed got cancelled, she was cast in this film as Annaamalai's mother Sivagami. Radha Ravi was not interested in playing Ashok's father Gangadharan as he had grown weary of playing elderly characters, but agreed to appear in Annaamalai at Rajinikanth's insistence. Pre-production works such as casting and location hunting took place on the day before shooting began. Balachander's wife Rajam and their daughter Pushpa Kandhaswamy received the producer credit.

=== Filming ===
Annaamalai was launched with a puja at the Lord Ganapathi temple within AVM Studios. Principal photography began on 11 March 1992. The muhurat shot involved Annaamalai breaking a coconut and praying in a temple. After the muhurat shot, the first scene to be filmed was a comedy scene where Annaamalai would save Ashok, who has been brought to court for a minor offence. Krissna removed the scene from the final cut as he felt it had no bearing on the script. The introductory song "Vanthenda Paalkaaran" was shot at Ooty. Krissna wanted the picturisation of the song to be vibrant and colourful like the songs of Hindi films starring Amitabh Bachchan. The scene in the song where Annaamalai shows his face to the camera was extended in slow motion by Krissna so it would feel if he was looking towards the audience. The song was choreographed by Prabhu Deva. While filming the scene where Annaamalai challenges Ashok and Gangadharan after they demolish his house, the makers decided to include wind, rain and lightning in the background to show how Mother Nature was angry at the wrongs meted out to Annaamalai.

The scene where Annaamalai enters a ladies' hostel and gets terrified by a snake was shot at Chakra House, Alwarpet. A snake was brought specifically for the scene. The owner of the snake earlier worked in previous films of Rajinikanth. Krissna told cinematographer P. S. Prakash to use a zoom lens so that he could adjust the camera according to the situation. After the scene was finished, the members of the crew enjoyed the shot. Krissna congratulated Rajinikanth and asked him how he performed it so well and if it was planned, and Rajinikanth replied it was not planned; expressions in the scene were a result of his fear. In the same scene, Shanmugasundaram came with initial dialogues to convey Annaamalai's fear. Krissna felt that dialogues were redundant in such a situation. Rajinikanth insisted to keep Kadavule Kadavule (Oh God! Oh God!) as the dialogue. Krissna agreed as it went well into the situation of the scene. According to Krissna, nobody on set realised that the snake's mouth was not stitched; it was only after filming ended for that day that the director came to realise that Rajinikanth's life was at risk the entire time.

The title song "Annaamalai Annaamalai" where the title character and Subbu appear in periodic costumes was shot at the Fernhills Palace, Ooty while the matching shots were shot at Sivaji Gardens. Krissna shot the song sequence in a technique where the lip sync is perfect while the dance movements being fast, taking inspiration from the song "Mamavukku Koduma" from Punnagai Mannan (1986). The song "Vetri Nichayam", which is a montage showing Annaamalai's rise to power over the course of several years, was shot in many prestigious places such as Sea Rock Hotel, Bombay. The song "Rekkai Katti Parakudhu" was shot at Boat Club Road in Adyar and Horticultural Society in Radhakrishnan Road. The scene where Annaamalai and Ashok face each other on opposite escalators was shot at the Centaur Hotel in Bombay as no hotel in Madras had escalators then. Another scene, where Annaamalai beats up Sargunam in a one-sided fight was filmed at Hotel Ambassador Pallava. Filming was completed in 45 working days.

=== Post-production ===
The "Super Star" graphic title card

Annaamalai was edited by the duo Ganesh Kumar. It was the first film to feature the introductory "Super Star" graphic title card, where the words 'SUPER' and 'STAR' form in blue dots on the screen followed by R-A-J-N-I in gold, set to the sound of laser beams while the word "Hey!" plays in loop in the background. This idea was conceived by Krissna, who was inspired by the opening gun barrel sequence in the James Bond films, and felt that Rajinikanth, who was becoming a phenomenon, "warranted a unique logo to go with his name".

Rajinikanth initially objected to the inclusion of the Super Star title card as he felt it was "brazen self-aggrandisement" and "embarrassing", but Krissna convinced him, saying it would generate large applause. Balachander supported Krissna, and convinced Rajinikanth, who relented. The Super Star title card was created at Prasad Labs and took a month to complete because "every frame had to be animated by hand". The final cut of Annaamalai was initially 14,950 feet (4,560 m), at a time when the length of Tamil films was restricted to 14,500 feet (4,400 m), equal to two hours and forty-five minutes. With the removal of the courtroom scene, the final cut was reduced by 450 feet (140 m).

== Themes ==
Annaamalai revolves around themes such as friendship, betrayal and revenge. According to Krissna, none of the dialogues or scenes in the film were meant to be allegorical to Rajinikanth's enmity with politician J. Jayalalithaa, but they were interpreted by viewers that way. Krissna said an astrologer's dialogue to Annaamalai "Unakku amma naala dhaan problem varum" (Very soon, you are going to have problems because of a woman) was meant to be a "fun introduction" to the character Subbu, and Ekambaram reforming after hearing Annaamalai's words was intended to show "why an MLA turns a new leaf after hearing the words of a milkman", but viewers interpreted both scenes as reflecting "Rajini hitting out at Jayalalithaa". He also said the scene of Annaamalai going up an escalator and Ashok's going down one is symbolic of Annaamalai's rise and Ashok's fall.

== Music ==
The soundtrack was composed by Deva, with lyrics by Vairamuthu. It was released on 8 May 1992, under the Lahari label. The theme song, which does not appear on the soundtrack and plays during the Super Star graphic title card, was inspired by the James Bond Theme, and was composed by Deva's brother Sabesh of the Sabesh–Murali duo.

== Release ==
Annaamalai was released theatrically on 27 June 1992. Its opening was threatened since the government of Jayalalithaa implemented a new rule where posters of films were prohibited in Madras. Nevertheless, according to Krissna, the lack of promos only increased the hype and worked to the film's advantage. The film completed a 175-day run at the box office. It was the highest-grossing film in Tamil cinema to that point, and started Rajinikanth's "meteoric rise at the box office". For his performance, Rajinikanth won the Ambika Award for Best Actor.

== Reception ==
Lalitha Dileep of The Indian Express said the film "combines good screenplay, proficient direction and first rate acting. The end result is both entertaining and engrossing". She said the metamorphosis of Annaamalai from a simpleton to a wealthy man was "done in a plausible manner and with great cinematic finesse", praised the editing, the cinematography, the music and lyrics, concluding, "[Annaamalai] is enjoyable and touching." K. Vijiyan of New Straits Times praised the performances of Rajinikanth and Manorama, but felt that for a film depicting the close bonds of friendship, "the reason given for the split between Ashok and [Annaamalai] is rather weak." Vijiyan criticised the revenge plot as stale, the "good friends getting separated" trope for being derivative, and felt some of the songs were unnecessary since they were only slowing the film's pace. He praised the fight sequences, Deva's music and Janagaraj's comedy, but felt Khushbu and Rekha were merely "decorative items", concluding, "[Annaamalai] will be a hit with [Rajinikanth's] admirers but a disappointment for Balachander's discerning fans who are looking for a story with a difference."

A special screening was held for the actor Sivaji Ganesan who told Krissna, "In my heyday, the camera remained steady while I would move up and down to make an impact as a hero, but you've limited [Rajinikanth's] movements and made the camera whirl around. The dynamism of the shots have helped project heroism better [...] You've showcased another dimension of [Rajinikanth]. The film's plus is its making." Sundarji of Kalki noted that Rekha was underutilised, criticised Deva's music for being derivative, but praised Janagaraj's comedy (especially his broken English dialogues) and many of Rajinikanth's dialogues which he felt had political undertones.

== Legacy ==
Annaamalai set multiple trends in Tamil cinema, including a "mass introduction song for a hero", (Note: Two earlier Rajinikanth films, Vanakkatukuriya Kathaliye (1977) and Murattu Kaalai (1980) already introduced his character onscreen through a song, but after Annaamalai "started the legendary intro songs that have become the quintessential entry point for any actor.") a "special background music for the hero", and a poor man's rise to riches depicted during the course of a song. The Superstar graphic title card featured in many of Rajinikanth's later films, often with minor variations. It also inspired many other South Indian films to use similar title cards to promote their lead actors. Many dialogues from the film attained popularity such as "Naan solradaiyum seiven, soladadeiyum seiven" (I will do what I say, and I will also do what I don't say), "Malai da, Annamalai" (Malai, man. It’s Annamalai), "Ashok, indha Annamalai un nanban ah than pathiruka, inimey indha Annamalai un virodhiya pakkapora. Indha naal un calendar la kurichi vechikko. Innayilarunthe un azhivu kaalam aarambamaayiduchi" (Ashok, this Annamalai has only looked at you as a friend so far, but from now on, you will see this Annamalai as your enemy. Mark this day in your calendar. Your downfall has begun from this very day), and "I'm a bad man".

In 1996, the newly-formed Tamil Maanila Congress chose the character Annaamalai's cycle as its official symbol, "Rekkai Katti Parakudhu" as its theme song, and won the 1996 Tamil Nadu Legislative Assembly election by a huge margin. Annaamalai was remade into Telugu as Kondapalli Raja (1993), and into Kannada as Gokarna (2003). It has influenced other films with regards to plot and characterisations such as Aarumugam (2009) (also directed by Krissna) and Engaeyum Eppothum (2011), while its plot details were parodied or re-enacted in films such as Pandian (1992), Paarthale Paravasam (2001), Boss Engira Bhaskaran (2010), and Tamizh Padam (2010). The film has, however, gained criticism for glorifying smoking, a trait Rajinikanth eschewed in his films after Baba (2002).

== Bibliography ==
- Krissna, Suresh; Rangarajan, Malathi (2012). My Days with Baasha. Westland Ltd. ISBN 978-93-8162-629-0.
- Ramachandran, Naman (2014) [2012]. Rajinikanth: The Definitive Biography. Penguin Books. ISBN 978-81-8475-796-5.
