= Satyam Shivam Sundaram (disambiguation) =

Satyam Shivam Sundaram is a 1978 Indian Hindi-language romantic drama film by Raj Kapoor and also the motto of Doordarshan. It may also refer to:

- Sathyam Shivam Sundaram (1987 film), a 1987 Indian Kannada-language film
- Sathyam Sivam Sundaram (2000 film), a 2000 Indian Malayalam-language film
- Maaro (film), a 2011 Indian Telugu-language film, working title Satyam Sivam Sundaram
