= G. Satyamurthy =

Indian screenwriter

- Born: Gorthi Satyamurthy; 24 May 1954; Vedurupaka, East Godavari, Andhra Pradesh, India
- Died: 14 December 2015 (aged 61); Chennai, Tamil Nadu, India
- Occupations: Screenwriter; novelist; film director
- Spouse: Siromani
- Children: Devi Sri Prasad; Sagar; Padmini

Gorthi Satyamurthy (24 May 1954 – 14 December 2015) was an Indian screenwriter known for his work in Telugu cinema. Over his career, he wrote the script for more than 90 films and provided dialogues for over 400 films.

Some of his notable works include Devatha (1982), Abhilasha (1983), Kirayi Kotigadu (1983), Challenge (1984), Srinivasa Kalyanam (1987), Khaidi No. 786 (1988), Nari Nari Naduma Murari (1990), Sathruvu (1991), Chanti (1992), Bangaru Bullodu (1993), Matru Devo Bhava (1993), Pedarayudu (1995), and Pelli (1997). Satyamurthy frequently collaborated with actor Chiranjeevi on several successful projects. He was also the father of music composer Devi Sri Prasad and singer Sagar.

== Early life ==
Gorti Satyamurthy was born on 24 May 1953 or 1954 in Vedurupaka, a village in Rayavaram mandal, East Godavari district, Andhra Pradesh. He completed his Bachelor of Science (B.Sc.) degree in Ramachandrapuram before pursuing a Bachelor of Education degree (B.Ed.) at Andhra National College of Education, Machilipatnam. After completing his studies, Satyamurthy began his career as a teacher.

== Career ==
=== Literary career ===
Satyamurthy had a passion for literature, which led him to begin his writing journey with essays and novels. His first novel, Chaitanyam, marked the start of his literary career. His works, including Pavitrulu, Punarankitam, Edaloyalo Nidurinche, Digambara Ambaram, and Adhara Garalam, garnered appreciation among literary enthusiasts. Satyamurthy’s writing often explored the complexities of human relationships, establishing his reputation as a novelist and storyteller, which eventually drew him towards the film industry.

=== Film career ===
Satyamurthy made his entry into Telugu cinema as a story writer with the 1982 film Devatha, directed by K. Raghavendra Rao and produced by D. Ramanaidu. The success of the film brought him recognition, leading to a prolific career in screenwriting. Over the years, he contributed to numerous successful films, such as Abhilasha (1983), Kirayi Kotigadu (1983), Challenge (1984), Srinivasa Kalyanam (1987), Khaidi No. 786 (1988), Nari Nari Naduma Murari (1990), Chanti (1992), Bangaru Bullodu (1993), Matru Devo Bhava (1993), Pedarayudu (1995), and Pelli (1997). Satyamurthy's collaboration with Chiranjeevi resulted in several successful films like Abhilasha, Challenge, Jwala, and Khaidi No. 786, contributing to the actor’s rise to stardom.

Alongside his successful career as a writer, Satyamurthy also ventured into film direction. He directed films such as Chaitanyam (1987), Super Express (1991), Palletoori Mogudu (1994) and Baava garu. Unlike mainstream commercial cinema, Satyamurthy's directorial ventures were known for their strong emphasis on the values he believed in, earning critical acclaim. However, due to his busy schedule as a writer, he could not fully dedicate himself to direction.

== Personal life ==
Satyamurthy was married and had three children—two sons, music composer Devi Sri Prasad and singer Sagar, and a daughter, Padmini. He died on 14 December 2015 due to a myocardial infarction.

== Filmography ==
As Writer

Year	Film	Notes	Ref.
1982	Devatha	story	
1983	Abhilasha	screenplay	
1983	Kirayi Kotigadu	dialogues	
1984	Bava Maradallu		
1984	Challenge	dialogues	
1985	Jwala	dialogues	
1987	Srinivasa Kalyanam	story, dialogues	
1988	Kanchana Sita		
1988	Khaidi No. 786	dialogues	
1989	Bhale Donga	story	
1990	Nari Nari Naduma Murari	screenplay	
1991	Sathruvu	dialogues	
1992	Chanti	dialogues	
1993	Bangaru Bullodu	screenplay	
1993	Mathru Devo Bhava		
1995	Amma Donga	story	
1995	Pedarayudu	dialogues	
1997	Pelli	dialogues	
2003	Maa Bapu Bommaku Pellanta	dialogues	

As Director

Year	Film	Ref.
1987	Chaitanyam	
1991	Super Express	
1994	Palletoori Mogudu	
