= Sagar (singer) =

Indian playback singer

- Born: Gorthi Vidya Sagar Vedurupaka, Andhra Pradesh, India
- Occupations: singer; lyricist; performer
- Years active: 2004–present
- Labels: Aditya Music; Lahari Music
- Spouse: Mounica (m. 2019)

Gorthi Vidya Sagar, popularly known as Sagar, is an Indian playback singer, lyricist and dialogue writer who predominantly works in Telugu cinema and Telugu music. He started his singing career with the film Varsham (2004), composed by his brother Devi Sri Prasad. "Top Lechipoddi", "Sailaja Sailaja", "Nannaku Prematho", "Pakka Local", "Jatha Kalise", "Nammaka Thappani" and "Hello Guru Prema Kosame" are some of his popular songs.

== Personal life and career ==
Sagar started his career with the film Varsham (2004) and then sang around 80 songs. He has mostly collaborated with his brother Devi Sri Prasad in playback singing. In June 2019, he married Dr. Mounica. He turned into dialogue writer with the film Rakshasudu. He is the son of veteran writer G. Satyamurthy, who died on 14 December 2015.

== Discography ==
=== As playback singer ===
Year	Album	Song(s)	Language	Composer	Notes
2003	Varsham	"Neeti Mullai"	Telugu	Devi Sri Prasad	
2004	Arya	"Nuvvunte"	Telugu	Devi Sri Prasad	
2005	Nuvvostanante Nenoddantana	"Paripoke Pitta"	Telugu	Devi Sri Prasad	
2005	Nuvvostanante Nenoddantana	"Padam Kadalanantundha"	Telugu	Devi Sri Prasad	
2005	Oka Oorilo	"Ye Maikam"	Telugu	Devi Sri Prasad	
2005	Bunny	"Jabilammavo"	Telugu	Devi Sri Prasad	
2005	Mazhai	"Muthu Mazhaiye"	Tamil	Devi Sri Prasad	
2006	Bommarillu	"Nammaka Thappani"	Telugu	Devi Sri Prasad	
2006	Pournami	"Yevaro Raavali(Duet)"	Telugu	Devi Sri Prasad	
2007	Shankar Dada Zindabad	"Good Morning Hyderabad"	Telugu	Devi Sri Prasad	
2007	Tulasi	"Nee Kallathoti"	Telugu	Devi Sri Prasad	
2008	Santosh Subramaniam	"Uyire Uyire Piriyadhey"	Tamil	Devi Sri Prasad	
2008	Ready	"Naa Pedavulu Nuvvaithe"	Telugu	Devi Sri Prasad	
2008	Sangama	"Sangama"	Kannada	Devi Sri Prasad	
2008	King	"O Manmadhuda"	Telugu	Devi Sri Prasad	
2009	Current	"Rekkalu"	Telugu	Devi Sri Prasad	
2009	Arya 2	"Karige Loga (D-Plugged)"	Telugu	Devi Sri Prasad	
2010	Namo Venkatesa	"Nee Kallalo"	Telugu	Devi Sri Prasad	
2010	Kutty	"Yaaro En Nenjai"	Tamil	Devi Sri Prasad	
2011	Mr. Perfect	"Aakasam Badhalaina"	Telugu	Devi Sri Prasad	
2011	Dhada	"Chinnaga Chinnaga"	Telugu	Devi Sri Prasad	
2012	Julayi	"Mee Intiki Mundu"	Telugu	Devi Sri Prasad	
2012	Sarocharu	"Gusa Gusa"	Telugu	Devi Sri Prasad	
2013	Iddarammayilatho	"Top Lechipoddi"	Telugu	Devi Sri Prasad	
2014	Veeram	"Ival Dhaana"	Tamil	Devi Sri Prasad	
2015	Yevadu	"Pimple Dimple"	Telugu	Devi Sri Prasad	
2015	Legend	"Lasku Tapa"	Telugu	Devi Sri Prasad	
2015	S/O Satyamurthy	"Jaaruko"	Telugu	Devi Sri Prasad	
2015	Shivam	"Andamaina Lokam"	Telugu	Devi Sri Prasad	
2015	Srimanthudu	"Jatha Kalise"	Telugu	Devi Sri Prasad	
2015	Kumari 21F	"Baby U Gonna Miss Me"	Telugu	Devi Sri Prasad	
2016	Nenu Sailaja	"Sailaja Sailaja"	Telugu	Devi Sri Prasad	
2016	Nannaku Prematho	"Nannaku Prematho"	Telugu	Devi Sri Prasad	
2016	Sardaar Gabbar Singh	"Nee Chepakallu"	Telugu	Devi Sri Prasad	
2016	Janatha Garage	"Pakka Local"	Telugu	Devi Sri Prasad	
2017	Nenu Local	"Next Enti"	Telugu	Devi Sri Prasad	
2017	Nenu Local	"Side Please"	Telugu	Devi Sri Prasad	Additional Vocals
2017	Rarandoi Veduka Chudham	"Bhramaramba"	Telugu	Devi Sri Prasad	
2017	DJ: Duvvada Jagannadham	"Box Baddhalai Poyi"	Telugu	Devi Sri Prasad	
2017	Jaya Janaki Nayaka	"A For Apple"	Telugu	Devi Sri Prasad	
2017	Vunnadhi Okate Zindagi	"Vunnadi Okate Zindagi"	Telugu	Devi Sri Prasad	
2017	Middle Class Abbayi	"Kothaga"	Telugu	Devi Sri Prasad	
2018	Hello Guru Prema Kosame	"Hello Guru Prema Kosame"	Telugu	Devi Sri Prasad	
2018	Rangasthala	"Entha Muddagidiye"	Kannada	Devi Sri Prasad	Dubbed version
2019	F2: Fun and Frustration	"Girra Girra"	Telugu	Devi Sri Prasad	
2021	Alludu Adhurs	"Nadhila Nadhila"	Telugu	Devi Sri Prasad	
2021	Rang De	"Bus Stande Bus Stande"	Telugu	Devi Sri Prasad	
2022	Aadavaallu Meeku Joharlu	"Awesome"	Telugu	Devi Sri Prasad	
2022	F3	"Woo Aaa Aha Aha"	Telugu	Devi Sri Prasad	
2022	Khiladi	"Full Kick"	Telugu	Devi Sri Prasad	
2022	Liger	"Akdi Pakdi"	Tamil	Lijo George, DJ Chetas, Sunil Kashyap	Dubbed version
2022	Ranga Ranga Vaibhavanga	"Ranga Ranga Vaibhavanga"	Telugu	Devi Sri Prasad	
2024	Kanguva	"Yolo"	Telugu	Devi Sri Prasad	Dubbed version

=== As lyricist ===
Year	Film	Song	Composer	Language
2016	Nenu Sailaja	"The Night Is Still Young"	Devi Sri Prasad	Telugu
2022	Liger	"The Liger Hunt Theme"	Vikram Montrose	Tamil
2022	Liger	"Akdi Pakdi"	Lijo George; Dj Chetas; Sunil Kashyap	Tamil

=== As composer ===
Year	Film	Director	Notes
2017	Kachche Din	Shailendra Singh	Hindi short film

== Filmography ==
=== As dialogue writer ===
Year	Film	Director	Language	Notes
2019	Rakshasudu	Ramesh Varma	Telugu	Debut as Dialogue writer

== Awards and nominations ==
Year	Award	Category	Song	Film Album	Result
2005	Nandi Awards	Best Male Playback Singer	"Nuvvunte"	Arya	Won
2006	Filmfare Awards South	Best Male Playback Singer – Telugu	"Jabilammavo"	Bunny	Nominated
2016	South Indian International Movie Awards	Best Male Playback Singer – Telugu	"Jatha Kalise"	Srimanthudu	Won
2016	IIFA Utsavam	Best Male Playback Singer – Telugu	"Jatha Kalise"	Srimanthudu	Won
2017	South Indian International Movie Awards	Best Male Playback Singer – Telugu	"Sailaja Sailaja"	Nenu Sailaja	Won
