= Trisoolam =

Trisoolam may refer to:

- Trishula, a trident, a divine symbol in Hinduism
- Trisulam (film), a 1982 Telugu-language film
