= Ravi Raja Pinisetty =

Indian film director

- Other name: Ravi Raja
- Occupations: Film director Film producer
- Years active: 1985–present
- Known for: Film director Film producer
- Notable work: Yamudiki Mogudu; Chanti; Pedarayudu
- Spouse: Radha Rani
- Children: Aadhi Pinisetty (son); Sathya Prabhas Pinisetty (son)
- Relatives: Nikki Galrani (daughter-in-law)

Ravi Raja Pinisetty is an Indian film director known for his works in the Telugu cinema with actors such as Chiranjeevi, Nandamuri Balakrishna, Mohan Babu, Rajasekhar and Daggubati Venkatesh. Some of his major hits include Yamudiki Mogudu with Chiranjeevi, Pedarayudu with Mohan Babu, Bangaru Bullodu with Nandamuri Balakrishna and Chanti with Venkatesh. Most of his directorial ventures are remakes. He has directed about 40 films so far.

== Family ==
Ravi Raja Pinisetty has two sons. His elder son, Satya Prabhas, is a movie director and younger son Aadhi Pinisetty is an actor in Tamil and Telugu films.

== Filmography ==
Year	Title	Notes
1984	Veerabhadrudu	Remake of Kozhi Koovudhu
1985	Jwala	
1986	Tiger	Kannada film
1986	Punyasthree	Remake of Tamil movie Aval Sumangalithan
1986	Konaseema Kurrodu	
1987	Krishna Leela	
1987	Chakravarthy	Remake of Gnana Oli
1987	Nammina Bantu	Remake of Kannada film Thaliya Bhagya
1988	Donga Pelli	Remake of Tamil film Ninaive Oru Sangeetham
1988	Anna Chellelu	Remake of Tamil film Paasa Paravaigal
1988	Nyayam Kosam	Remake of Oru CBI Diary Kurippu
1988	Siripuram Chinnodu	
1988	Yamudiki Mogudu	
1989	Muthyamantha Muddu	Adaptation of Yandamoori novel Thriller
1989	Yamapaasam	Adaptation of Malladi novel Yamapaasam
1990	Abhimanyu	Kannada film Remake of Ankusam
1990	Pratibandh	Hindi film Remake of Ankusam
1990	Raja Vikramarka	Remake of My Dear Marthandan
1992	Chanti	Remake of Chinna Thambi
1992	Aaj Ka Goonda Raj	Remake of Gang Leader
1992	Balarama Krishnulu	Remake of Cheran Pandiyan
1993	Kondapalli Raja	Remake of Khudgarz
1993	Bangaru Bullodu	
1994	M. Dharmaraju M. A.	Remake of Amaidhi Padai
1994	S. P. Parasuram	Remake of Walter Vetrivel
1995	Pedarayudu	Remake of Nattamai
1995	Angrakshak	Hindi film
1996	Aranyam	
1996	Saradha Bullodu	
1997	Rukmini	Remake of Kannada movie Panchama Veda
1997	Devudu	
1998	Raayudu	Remake of Tamil movie Vallal
1999	Alludugaaru Vachcharu	Remake of Pooveli
2000	Okkadu Chalu	
2000	Maa Annayya	Remake of Vaanathai Pola
2001	Subhakaryam	Remake of Anandha Poongatre
2001	Adhipathi	Remake of Narasimham
2003	Maa Bapu Bommaku Pellanta	Remake of Nandanam
2003	Veede	Remake of Dhool
2004	K.D. No. 1	
2008	Andamaina Abaddham	Remake of Lovely
