= K. Murari =

Indian film producer (1944–2022)

- Born: 14 June 1944; Vijayawada, Krishna District, Madras Province, British India
- Died: 15 October 2022 (aged 78); Chennai, Tamil Nadu, India
- Occupations: Producer, Assistant Director

Katragadda Murari (14 June 1944 – 15 October 2022) was an Indian film producer who worked in Telugu cinema. He established the film production company Yuva Chithra Arts. His films are known for their knack in music. Music for all of his films was composed by K. V. Mahadevan. He released his autobiography Navvi Podurugaaka on 17 November 2012.

== Early life ==
Murari was born on 14 June 1944 in Vijayawada in Krishna district of Andhra Pradesh. He dropped out of final year M.B.B.S. at Kakatiya Medical College Warangal and moved to Madras to enter Film Industry. He started his career as an assistant director and moved on to become a Producer and produced Telugu films under Yuva Chitra Arts banner. Apart from producing movies, he edited a book, titled, "Telugu Chalanachitra Nirmatala Charitra (1931-2005)" (A History of Telugu Motion Picture Producers [1931-2005]).

== Controversies ==
The producer, who is known for classy film-making, was very vocal about upholding respect and dignity of veteran actors and film-makers in South India generally and Telugu film industry in particular. Murari lashed out at the organizers of Centenary celebrations of Indian Cinema organized at Chennai in 2013 in which the then President of India Pranab Mukherjee was the Chief Guest and the then Chief Minister of Tamil Nadu J. Jayalalithaa was the guest of honor and recipient of a medallion for her contributions to cinema. Speaking on the sidelines of the function to the media, Katragadda Murari has called the recently concluded centenary celebrations of Indian cinema a 'disgrace' for the Telugu film industry as several veterans were not invited and those who attended were not given due respect. "I'm surprised several industry veterans from Chennai were not even invited for the event. Artists such as Vennelakanti Rajeswara Prasad and Bhuvanachandra were among those who were not invited. I was told I would be invited but nobody contacted me and therefore I decided not to go. It's a disgrace to our industry," Murari told IANS. "If a committee is planning to honor an artist then it should let him or her know well in advance. Most of them didn't have a clue that they will be honoured until the minute they were called upon to receive their awards," he added. Commenting that the event lacked a basic sense of planning, Murari said, "They should have ideally given a single pass for all the four days but artists had to wait everyday at the entrance to pick up their passes. I was told that most of the artists who were honoured had to return their shawls and mementos because the committee had run out of stock".

On a different occasion, he faulted prominent Telugu film director K. Raghavendra Rao for being awarded honorary doctorate by the Gandhi Institute of Technology and Management (GITAM University) in the year 2014 at Visakhapatnam. "How can the Gitam University confer the director a Doctorate as he lacks dignity and held no social duty for over many years," he questioned. A video featuring the veteran producer's comments on Raghavendra Rao on the honorary doctorate issue became viral. Murari even recollected one incident where, he said, the veteran director denigrated his mother without any respect on seeing her photograph.

== Filmography ==
Year	Title	Director	Main cast
1978	Seetamalakshmi	K. Viswanath	Chandra Mohan, Talluri Rameswari
1979	Gorintaku	Dasari Narayana Rao	Sobhan Babu, Sujatha, Savitri
1981	Jegantalu	Singeetam Srinivasa Rao	Ramji, Mucherla Aruna
1982	Trisulam	K. Raghavendra Rao	Krishnam Raju, Sridevi, Jayasudha, Radhika
1984	Abhimanyudu	Dasari Narayana Rao	Sobhan Babu, Radhika, Vijayasanti
1986	Seetharama Kalyanam	Jandhyala	Balakrishna, Rajani
1987	Srinivasa Kalyanam	Kodi Ramakrishna	Venkatesh, Bhanupriya, Gautami
1988	Janaki Ramudu	K. Raghavendra Rao	Nagarjuna, Vijayashanti
1990	Nari Nari Naduma Murari	A. Kodandarami Reddy	Balakrishna, Shobana, Nirosha
