= Okkadu Chalu =

2000 film by Ravi Raja Pinisetty

- Directed by: Ravi Raja Pinisetty
- Screenplay by: Ravi Raja Pinisetty
- Dialogues by: Posani Krishna Murali
- Story by: Ravi Raja Pinisetty; V. Vijayendra Prasad
- Produced by: Sri Vaishnavi Creations
- Starring: Rajasekhar; Vishnuvardhan; Suresh; Rambha; Sanghavi
- Cinematography: Ram Pinisetty
- Edited by: A. Sreekar Prasad
- Music by: Koti
- Production company: Sri Vaishnavi Creations
- Release date: 23 June 2000
- Country: India
- Language: Telugu

Okkadu Chalu (transl. 'One man is enough') is a 2000 Indian Telugu-language action drama film written and directed by Ravi Raja Pinisetty and produced by Sri Vaishnavi Creations. The film stars Rajasekhar, Vishnuvardhan, Suresh, Rambha, and Sanghavi in key roles. The music was composed by Koti, and cinematography was handled by Ram Pinisetty.

Upon its release, Okkadu Chalu received a mixed to negative reception, with criticism for its storyline and narration, although the cinematography was praised.

== Plot ==
A ten-year-old boy is put on trial for the murder of two policemen. His father, a soldier, was preparing to testify against a corrupt official but was killed, along with his wife, in a staged police encounter. Seeking justice, the boy avenges their deaths by killing the officers responsible. When questioned, he vows to eradicate corruption within the police force. Major Bhargava, an army officer and the boy's father's superior, offers to adopt him, assuring the judge that he will guide the boy to become an honest police officer, which results in a reduced sentence.

Years later, the boy, named Surya, is raised by Major Bhargava and his wife, Lakshmi, growing up to become an Assistant Commissioner of Police. Known for his integrity, Surya frequently clashes with corrupt politicians, leading to multiple transfers. While posted in Visakhapatnam, he confronts Minister Appala Naidu, who forcibly removes his criminal son from police custody. Surya initiates a departmental strike until the minister apologizes and the son is returned. This leads to his transfer to Hyderabad, where his courage is put to the test.

In Hyderabad, Surya faces Dhanraj, a powerful mafia leader and criminal mastermind. Dhanraj, grieving his father's death, disrupts the local community with a public display of mourning. Surya intervenes, forcing Dhanraj to relocate the funeral to the outskirts of the city, which marks the beginning of a conflict between them. To weaken Surya, Dhanraj enlists Suresh, Major Bhargava's estranged son, and a mercenary. Surya arrests Suresh, which intensifies Dhanraj's animosity. In retaliation, Dhanraj orchestrates Major Bhargava's murder. Devastated, Bhargava's wife blames Surya for her husband's death. During the funeral, Dhanraj helps Suresh escape from custody.

Dhanraj's influence within the police leads to false accusations against Surya, putting his career at risk. Surya is given 48 hours to apprehend Suresh, and he embarks on a mission to clear his name. However, Surya is captured and tortured by Dhanraj's men. During his captivity, Surya uncovers a plot to assassinate the central defense minister and the chief minister at an upcoming public meeting.

In the climactic finale, Suresh is betrayed and killed by Dhanraj. Surya escapes, confronts Dhanraj and his gang, and successfully prevents the assassination attempt, reaffirming his commitment to justice and the values instilled in him by Major Bhargava.

== Cast ==
- Rajasekhar as ACP Surya
- Vishnuvardhan as Major Bhargava
- Suresh as Suresh
- Rambha
- Sanghavi
- Sharat Saxena as Dhanraj
- Sumalatha as Lakshmi
- Ranganath
- Giri Babu
- Sudhakar
- Kota Srinivasa Rao as Nandigama Narayana
- Rami Reddy as Appala Naidu
- Vallabhaneni Janardhan
- Satya Prakash as Appala Naidu's son
- Narsing Yadav as Dhanraj's henchman

== Production ==
Okkadu Chalu was produced by Vizag Raju under the banner of Sri Vaishnavi Creations. The script was written by Ravi Raja Pinisetty and V. Vijayendra Prasad, while the dialogues were penned by Posani Krishna Murali.

== Music ==
The music for Okkadu Chalu was composed by Koti, with lyrics written by Bhuvana Chandra, Sriharsha, and Samavedam Shanmukha Sarma.

Track list
No.	Title	Singer(s)	Length
1.	"Pibare Pibare Premarasam"	Ramu Chanchal, Anuradha Sriram	5:09
2.	"Hangaamare Hangamaare"	Anuradha Sriram, Devi Sri Prasad	5:07
3.	"Nee Debbaku Kaye"	Ramu Chanchal, Manasa	4:53
4.	"Raani Raani Vaste Ranee"	S. P. Balasubrahmanyam	3:54
5.	"Okkadu Chaalu"	Koti	4:33
Total length:			23:36

== Reception ==
Andhra Today reviewed Okkadu Chaalu as a routine action drama with an uninspiring storyline, illogical climax, and unimpressive music, though it praised the cinematography by Ram Pinisetty.

Telugucinema.com gave Okkadu Chalu a largely negative review, acknowledging its promising start and commendable cinematography but criticising its excessive plot elements, uneven performances, and lack of directorial control.

Indiainfo wrote "Though Ram Pinisetty's photography catches your eye, Raviraja Pinisetty’s bad direction coupled with poor editing and disturbing re-recording make the film quite avoidable".
