= Srinivasa Kalyanam (1987 film) =

- Theatrical release poster
- Directed by: Kodi Ramakrishna
- Written by: G. Satyamurthy
- Screenplay by: Kodi Ramakrishna
- Produced by: K. Murari
- Starring: Venkatesh; Bhanupriya; Gautami; Mohan Babu
- Cinematography: Nandamuri Mohan Krishna
- Edited by: Suresh Tata
- Music by: K. V. Mahadevan
- Production company: Yuva Chitra Arts
- Release date: 25 September 1987
- Running time: 143 minutes
- Country: India
- Language: Telugu

Srinivasa Kalyanam (transl. The Marriage of Srinivasa) is a 1987 Telugu-language romance film directed by Kodi Ramakrishna. It stars Venkatesh, Bhanupriya, Gautami, and Mohan Babu and music composed by K. V. Mahadevan. The film was produced by K. Murari under the Yuva Chitra Arts banner. The film was a Super Hit at the box office.

== Plot ==
Srinivas (Venkatesh), an educated unemployed guy and his sister Lakshmi (Varalakshmi) lost their parents in childhood while saving a landlord Sridhar Rao (Vankayala). They stay with their uncle Nagayah (Suthi Velu), who is a chronic drinker, takes away all the money given by Sridhar Rao and sells them. Srinivas's cousin Saroja (Gautami), daughter of Nagayah helps them to get away from that place and she stays back. They are adopted by a couple (Gollapudi Maruthi Rao and Y. Vijaya) in the city. Srinivas does all kinds of jobs like newspaper delivery boy, auto driver and runs a dance school, where he gets introduced to Lalitha (Bhanupriya), who will be looking for a job staying at the house of her sister (Anitha) and her brother-in-law Yenimdakula Venkatrao (Prasad Babu), who is a bad person. Srinivas gives Lalitha a job in his dance school and both of them fall in love. Meanwhile, Saroja changes her name to Swapna and comes to rent Srinivas' house not knowing that he's her cousin.

Bokka Lambodharam (Mohan Babu), the proprietor of a 5-star hotel, is a big womanizer. Incidentally, Srinivas' uncle Nagayya works as an assistant to him as Nisachara. He sees Lalitha in a dance program and is attracted to her. After a few days, Swapna knows the truth, which restarts her childhood love with Srinivas. At the same time, Bokka Lambodharam traps Lalitha's brother-in-law Venkatrao to get her. To protect her, Srinivas brings her home and tells her that he wants to marry her. After hearing that, Swapna sacrifices her love; while they are making marriage arrangements, Lalitha also knows the truth and decides to go away by accompanying Swapna with Srinivas. She takes the help of Bokka Lambodharam to stop the marriage, he agrees to that if she accepts his condition. Meanwhile, Swapna listens to everything and goes in place of Lalitha. Now Lalitha reveals the truth to Srinivas that Swapna is only Saroja, even Nagayah also recognizes his daughter. Srinivas goes and protects Swapna. Finally, Swapna/Saroja makes the marriage of Srinivas and Lalitha and she also stays along with them.

== Cast ==
- Venkatesh as Srinivas
- Bhanupriya as Lalitha
- Gautami as Swapna / Saroja
- Mohan Babu as Bokka Lambodharam
- Gollapudi Maruthi Rao
- Suthi Velu as Nagayya / Nisachara
- Prasad Babu as Yenimdakula Venkatrao
- Subhalekha Sudhakar as Rajesh
- Vankayala Satyanarayana as Sridhar Rao
- Bhimeswara Rao as Narasimham
- Gadiraju Subba Rao
- Varalakshmi as Lakshmi
- Srilakshmi
- Mamatha as item number
- Anitha as Lalitha's Sister
- Kalpana Rai as Sukumari
- Y. Vijaya

== Soundtrack ==
Srinivasa Kalyanam

Film score by K. V. Mahadevan
- Released: 1987
- Genre: Soundtrack
- Length: 31:43
- Label: Lahari Music
- Producer: K. V. Mahadevan

K. V. Mahadevan chronology
Sirivennela (1987)	Srinivasa Kalyanam (1987)	Muvva Gopaludu (1987)

Music composed by K. V. Mahadevan was released on Lahari Music Company.

Track list
No.	Title	Lyrics	Singer(s)	Length
1.	"Kadalika Kavalika"	Veturi Sundararama Murthy	S. P. Balasubrahmanyam, P. Susheela	4:48
2.	"Tholi Poddullo"	Veturi Sundararama Murthy	S. P. Balasubrahmanyam, S. Janaki	4:39
3.	"Vathsayana"	Jonnavittula Ramalingeswara Rao	S. P. Balasubrahmanyam, P. Susheela	4:29
4.	"Endaaka Egirevammaa"	Sirivennela Seetharama Sastry	S. P. Balasubrahmanyam, P. Susheela	4:35
5.	"Tummeda O Tummeda"	Sirivennela Seetharama Sastry	S. P. Balasubrahmanyam, P. Susheela	4:35
6.	"Jaabili Vacchi"	Sirivennela Seetharama Sastry	S. P. Balasubrahmanyam, P. Susheela	4:37
7.	"Anukoni Anukoni"	Sirivennela Seetharama Sastry	S. P. Balasubrahmanyam, S. Janaki	4:22
Total length:				31:41

== Others ==
- VCDs & DVDs on - VOLGA Videos, Hyderabad
