= Kirayi Kotigadu =

1983 Telugu film by Kodandarami Reddy

- Directed by: A. Kodandarami Reddy
- Screenplay by: A. Kodandarami Reddy
- Story by: Satyamurthy
- Dialogue by: Satyanand
- Produced by: N. Ramalingeswara Rao
- Starring: Krishna; Sridevi; Rao Gopala Rao
- Edited by: Kotagiri Venkateswara Rao
- Music by: K. Chakravarthy
- Production company: Ram Prasad Art Pictures
- Release date: 17 March 1983
- Country: India
- Language: Telugu

Kirayi Kotigadu (transl. "For hire" Kotigadu) is a 1983 Indian Telugu action drama film starring Krishna and Sridevi. The film was directed by A. Kodandarami Reddy who also wrote the screenplay while the story was provided by Satyamurthy. Chakravarthy scored and composed the film's soundtrack. Rao Gopala Rao, Allu Ramalingaiah and Giribabu play supporting characters.

The film was released on 17 March to good reviews and turned out to be a money spinner. The film became noted for the introduction scene of the protagonist Kotigadu, played by Krishna. Owing to the major success of the film, the director collaborated with Krishna for another film titled Ramarajyamlo Bheemaraju (1983) which was released in the same year to positive response.

== Plot ==
The story revolves around two notorious landlords who hire a ruthless and money-minded ruffian, Kotigadu, to deal with Rambabu, a military officer, who leads the villagers in a rebellion against the duo's atrocious activities. Though he heavily injures Ramu, the latter and Gauri, a village girl, discovers the good side of Kotigadu and decides to redeem him thereby pitting him against the landlords.

== Cast ==
- Krishna
- Sridevi as Gowri
- Rao Gopala Rao as Adiseshayya
- Allu Ramalingaiah as Garudachalam
- Sridhar as Rambabu
- Nirmalamma as Parvathamma
- Giribabu
- Jayamalini
- Mucherla Aruna as Lakshmi

== Release and reception ==
The film was released on 17 March 1983 to generally positive reviews. The film was declared a success at the box office.

== Soundtrack ==
The music was composed by Chakravarthy and all songs were penned by Veturi Sundararama Murthy.

Song title	Singer(s)	Length
"Ekkitokki Nee Andam"	S. P. Balasubramanyam, P. Susheela	4:08
"Namasthe Suswagatham"	S. P. Balasubramanyam, P. Susheela	4:20
"Chekkateppudavutundo"	S. P. Balasubramanyam, S. Janaki	3:32
"Pattumeeda Unnadi"	S. P. Balasubramanyam, P. Susheela	3:52
"Koodaballukkuni Kannaremo"	S. P. Balasubramanyam, P. Susheela	4:01
