= Challenge (1984 film) =

1984 film by A. Kodandarami Reddy

- Theatrical release poster
- Directed by: A. Kodandarami Reddy
- Written by: G. Satyamurthy
- Screenplay by: Sainath Thotapalli
- Based on: Dabbu to the power of Dabbu by Yandamuri Veerendranath
- Produced by: K. S. Rama Rao
- Starring: Chiranjeevi; Vijayashanti; Suhasini; Rao Gopal Rao
- Cinematography: Lok Singh
- Edited by: Kotagiri Venkateswara Rao
- Music by: Ilaiyaraaja
- Production company: Creative Commercials
- Release date: 9 August 1984
- Running time: 146 mins
- Country: India
- Language: Telugu

Challenge is a 1984 Indian Telugu-language film directed by A. Kodandarami Reddy and produced by K. S. Rama Rao under the Creative Commercials banner. It stars Chiranjeevi, Vijayashanti, Suhasini and Rao Gopal Rao with music composed by Ilaiyaraaja. This film is based on Yandamuri Veerendranath's novel Dabbu to the power of Dabbu (transl. Money to the power of Money). The plot revolves around an unemployed youngster (Chiranjeevi) taking up a challenge of a successful business magnate (Rao) to earn ₹50 lakh in five years.

Challenge released on 9 August 1984 and became a critically acclaimed and commercially successful film.

== Plot ==
When his mother falls gravely ill, Gandhi resorts to stealing money for medicine, but she dies before he can return, leaving him unable to pay for her cremation. Cornered by a corrupt ward boy demaning storage fees, Gandhi encounters business tycoon Ram Mohan Rao's daughter, Harika, who gives him five hundered rupees for the funeral after he successfully solves a numerical puzzle. After completing the rites, a destitute and homeless Gandhi rescues a young woman named Lakshmi from drowing after she jumps off a bridge.

They both reach Lakshmi's house and Gandhi finds an advertisement in the newspaper for a job. Gandhi understands the trick behind that ad and walks into Ram Mohan Rao's house for an interview. Gandhi gives a tit-for-tat for publishing an ad to fool people and both enter into an argument. When Gandhi says that it is not so difficult to make money and he can make ₹50 lakh in five years lawfully, Ram Mohan Rao challenges him that if Gandhi succeeds, he will get his daughter married to him. Both sign an agreement on this and Gandhi leaves on 19 April.

Ram Mohan Rao throws the agreement into the trash bin and forgets about the bet, but determined Gandhi starts planning for his ₹50 lakh. He wins his first ₹100, through gambling and explains to Lakshmi, the difference between law and justice and that he won those Rs.100 lawfully. Meanwhile, Ram Mohan Rao tries to make marriage arrangements for his daughter Harika, but Gandhi learns of this through Harika and spoils the marriage arrangement, citing their bet. While Gandhi is leaving, Ram Mohan Rao sends goons to kill Gandhi, but Gandhi bashes all goons and tells them to inform Ram Mohan Rao that not only he is intelligent but also has the physical power to beat up such goons.

Gandhi slowly progresses and buys a new house and moves in with Lakshmi, who now, is his secretary. Lakshmi gives Gandhi a letter which he must read only after completion of challenge duration of five years regardless of his success or failure in the challenge. Lakshmi's ill-charactered brother Hanumantha Rao enters their house with his wife Priyamvada, pretending to be homeless. Despite Lakshmi's warning, Gandhi lets them stay.

Hanumantha Rao tries every possible trick to defame Gandhi and separate him from Lakshmi and Harika but fails. Also, Priyamvada tries to seduce Gandhi but realizes her mistake on his advice and reveals that her husband Hanumantha Rao is the one who is leaking Gandhi's business secrets to Ram Mohan Rao. Gandhi plans to start a paper mill to compete with Ram Mohan Rao, and accidentally meets a young man named Vidyarthi.

Gandhi learns that Vidyarthi used to work for Ram Mohan Rao and uses Vidhyarthi's experience and talent to promote his business. During his rise, Harika supports him by saving him from going bankrupt and starts adoring him. Hanumantha Rao manages to create problems in Gandhi's paper mill and Lakshmi resigns her job and revolts seeing Gandhi being adamant about making money rather than bothering about his workers' welfare. The misunderstanding between them keeps developing. Since the problems in paper mill don't seem to come to an end, Gandhi opts for another plan which is launching a new scooter into the market. Gandhi gets an immense response from the public for his new scooter launch and gets a lot of money in advance booking in the form of cash, cheques and Demand Drafts.

On the last day of the bet, Gandhi is left with ₹500 short of ₹50 lakh and the ward boy, now a changed man, returns the ₹500 he took immorally from Gandhi. Jubilant, Gandhi tries to reach Ram Mohan Rao but realizes that he is leaving the country with his daughter. On his way to the airport, Gandhi is attacked by Hanumanth Rao and goons. Gandhi bashes them up and reaches Ram Mohan Rao to declare his victory. On his way, he reads Lakshmi's letter which has good wishes to Gandhi from Lakshmi for him to succeed in every matter of his life and expressing her love for him.

When Ram Mohan Rao tries to shoot Gandhi, he saves himself with the suitcase in his hand, which has all the cash in it. He throws away all the money, during which the letter given by Lakshmi to him falls down at the feet of Harika. He explains that he accepted the challenge just to show Ram Mohan Rao that there is nothing impossible for a man who has self-confidence. He confesses that he has realised from lakshmi's letter there are few things in this world that money can't buy, like love and peace. Further he accuses Ram Mohan Rao of being so arrogant that when they agreed to the challenge he did not consider his daughter's opinion on marriage before pawning her off in the bet and that Ram Mohan Rao didn't even mention what Gandhi must give or do if Gandhi fails in the challenge. Meanwhile, Harika reads the letter and hands over it to Gandhi and advices him to not miss her before she leaves. Gandhi returns to Lakshmi and marries her.

== Cast ==
- Chiranjeevi as Gandhi
- Vijayashanti as Harika
- Suhasini as Lakshmi
- Rao Gopal Rao as Rammohan Rao
- Gollapudi Maruti Rao as Hanumantha Rao
- Rajendra Prasad as Vidyarthi
- Allu Aravind in a cameo appearance
- P. Sai Kumar as Ward boy Prakasam
- Silk Smitha as Priyamvada

== Production ==
After the success of Abhilasha (1983), Kodandarami Reddy, Chiranjeevi and K. S. Ramarao came together for second time which became Challenge which was an adaptation of novel Dabbu to the power of Dabbu.

== Music ==
Challenge

Film score by Ilaiyaraaja
- Released: 1984
- Genre: Soundtrack
- Length: 22:37
- Label: Aditya Music
- Producer: Ilaiyaraaja

Ilaiyaraaja chronology
Sitaara (1984)	Challenge (1984)	Merupu Daadi (1984)

Music was composed by Maestro Ilaiyaraaja. Lyrics were written by Veturi. Music released on ECHO Audio Company.

S.No	Song title	Singers	Picturised On	length
1	"Induvadana"	S. P. Balasubrahmanyam & S. Janaki	Chiranjeevi & Vijayashanti	4:05
2	"Om Santhi"	S. P. Balasubrahmanyam & S. Janaki	Chiranjeevi & Vijayashanti	4:16
3	"Manase Mykam"	S. Janaki	Chiranjeevi & Silk Smitha	4:22
4	"Bhama Ee Thippalu"	S. P. Balasubrahmanyam & S. Janaki	Chiranjeevi & Suhasini Maniratnam	4:09
5	"Sayamkalam Sagarateeram"	S. P. Balasubrahmanyam & S. Janaki	Chiranjeevi & Vijayashanti	4:11

== Reception ==
The film received positive reviews and became a commercial success.
