= Kondapalli Raja =

- Theatrical poster
- Directed by: Ravi Raja Pinisetty
- Written by: Paruchuri Brothers (dialogues)
- Screenplay by: Ravi Raja Pinisetty
- Produced by: K. V. V. Satyanarayana
- Starring: Venkatesh; Nagma; Suman
- Cinematography: K. Ravindra Babu
- Edited by: Vemuri Ravi
- Music by: M. M. Keeravani
- Production company: Saudhamini Creations
- Release date: 9 July 1993
- Running time: 144 minutes
- Country: India
- Language: Telugu

Kondapalli Raja is a 1993 Indian Telugu-language action drama film directed by Ravi Raja Pinisetty and produced by K. V. V. Satyanarayana under Saudhamini Creations. It stars Venkatesh, Nagma and Suman, with music composed by M. M. Keeravani. The film is a remake of the 1987 Hindi movie Khudgarz which in turn was based on Jeffrey Archer's 1979 novel Kane and Abel. This was the second Telugu remake of Khudgarz after Prana Snehithulu (1988). The film was successful at the box office.

== Plot ==
Raja and Ashok have been best friends since childhood. Raja is a milkman while Ashok is the son of rich businessman and hotelier Gangadharam. Ashok falls in love with Shanthi, a poor girl, but his father is against the wedding. Raja arranges the wedding and earns his ire. Meanwhile, Raja falls in love with Subbu/Subbalakshmi, whom he subsequently marries.

Plotting to divide his son and Raja, Gangadharam hints that he would like to build a hotel on Raja's land. He gives the land to Ashok without even accepting money for it. When Gangadharam later talks about bringing down his house, he slaps Gangadharam in anger and even Ashok slaps Raja which breaks up their friendship. Gangadharam orders Raja's house to be bulldozed, which angers Raja and he blames Ashok. Raja boasts that he will become a bigger and more successful hotelier than Ashok. Raja, with his hard work and honesty, becomes the biggest businessman in the city.

Ashok's younger brother Srikanth and Raja's younger sister Kamala study in the same college, Srikanth traps Kamala and marries her to take revenge against Raja; he often harasses her. Meanwhile, during an auction, Raja tricks Ashok to buy a plot for 12 crores, which was not worth more than 3 crores, Raja buys out the entire property of Ashok including his house. But with goodness in heart and the old friendship in mind, Raja gives back the property to Ashok.

Meanwhile, Ashok becomes aware of the tricks played by his father by his cousin Prabhakar. Meanwhile, Daniel, a common enemy of Raja and Ashok, joins hands with Gangadharam. Both of them plan to kill Raja by mixing poison in his milk factory; information is passed to Ashok by Kamala, that's why she is tortured by Srikanth and Gangadharam, Raja saves her and discovers their plan to put poison in the milk. At the same time, Ashok goes to stop Daniel, but he is injured, Raja saves him, both of them join hands and see the end of Daniel and Gangadharam, which changes Srikanth and their friendship resumes.

== Cast ==
- Venkatesh as Raja
- Suman as Ashok
- Nagma as Subbalakshmi
- Srikanth as Srikanth
- Kota Srinivasa Rao as Gangadharam
- Captain Raju as Daniel
- Ali as Hotel Server
- Sujatha as Raja's mother
- Vinod as Prabhakar
- Yuvarani as Kamala
- Sudhakar as Muddu Krishna
- Costumes Krishna as Minister Simhadri Appanna
- Rekha as Shanthi
- Narsing Yadav as Rowdy
- Archana Puran Singh as Gujji Girl
- Master Raghavendra as young Raja

== Production ==
Kondapalli Raja was the remake of Tamil film Annaamalai (1992) which itself was remade from Hindi film Khudgarz (1987). Despite Khudgarz already being remade in Telugu as Prana Snehithulu (1988), the film's producer K. V. V. Sathyanarayana went ahead and bought the remake rights of Annamalai thus making it the second remake of the film in Telugu. He initially planned to make this film with Chiranjeevi who also agreed in this film however Venkatesh who came to know about the remake expressed interest in working in the film. Sathyanarayana who was producing Sundarakanda with Venkatesh at that time was surprised by this as it was a rare occurrence that a film with the same actor begins while another film with him is under production but proceeded to do the film. Actress Divya Bharti was offered the female role. But she insisted on the director to cast Nagma as she was already busy with her film Tholi Muddu.

However Krishnam Raju objected the making of the film as the team did not obtain his permission to make a film on similar subject and took the matter to the court. The matter was later settled and was compromised.

== Soundtrack ==
Kondapalli Raja

Film score by M. M. Keeravani
- Released: 1993
- Genre: Soundtrack
- Length: 31:00
- Label: Surya Audio
- Producer: M. M. Keeravani

M. M. Keeravani chronology
Alimayya (1993)	Kondapalli Raja (1993)	Matru Devo Bhava (1993)

Music composed by M. M. Keeravani. Music released on Surya Audio.

No.	Title	Lyrics	Singer(s)	Length
1.	"Kondapalli Raja"	Bhuvanachandra	S. P. Balasubrahmanyam	4:57
2.	"Guvvamgudugudu"	Bhuvanachandra	Mano, S. P. Sailaja	4:45
3.	"Dhanimma Thotaloki"	Veturi	S. P. Balasubrahmanyam, Chitra	5:03
4.	"A Kasilo Siggu"	Veturi	S. P. Balasubrahmanyam, Chitra	4:55
5.	"Ammammammammo"	Veturi	Mano, Chitra	5:03
6.	"Singarayakonda"	Veturi	S. P. Balasubrahmanyam, Malgudi Subha	5:00
Total length:				31:00
