= Prana Snehithulu =

1988 film directed by V. Madhusudhana Rao

Prana Snehitulu
- Poster
- Directed by: V. Madhusudhana Rao
- Story by: Rakesh Roshan
- Based on: Khudgarz
- Starring: Krishnam Raju; Sarath Babu; Radha; Mucherla Aruna
- Music by: Raj–Koti
- Release date: 2 September 1988
- Country: India
- Language: Telugu

Prana Snehithulu (transl. Lifelong friends) is a 1988 Indian Telugu-language action drama film directed by V. Madhusudhana Rao. It is a remake of the 1987 Hindi film Khudgarz, which itself was based on Jeffrey Archer's 1979 novel Kane and Abel. The generous borrowing had prompted Archer to call Bollywood directors “a bunch of thieves” for stealing his storylines. The film stars Krishnam Raju, Sarath Babu and Radha.

== Cast ==
- Krishnam Raju
- Sarath Babu
- Radha
- Suresh
- Mucherla Aruna
- Murali Mohan
- M. Balaiah
- Kota Srinivasa Rao
- Saradhi
- Sagarika
- A. J. V. Prasad
- Lakshmi Priya
- Baby Prasanna Lakshmi

== Production ==
Prana Snehithulu, directed by V. Madhusudhana Rao, is a remake of the 1987 Hindi film Khudgarz, itself inspired by Jeffrey Archer's 1979 novel Kane and Abel. Shooting took place at Padmalaya Studios.

== Soundtrack ==
The soundtrack was composed by the duo Raj–Koti while the lyrics were written by Bhuvana Chandra. Audio was released through LEO music.

Track listing
No.	Title	Singer(s)	Length
1.	"Kanchu Kanchu"	S. P. Balasubrahmanyam, S. Janaki	3:58
2.	"Snehaanikanna Minna"	S. P. Balasubrahmanyam	4:28
3.	"Mudduku Haddulu"	S. P. Balasubrahmanyam, S. Janaki	4:29
4.	"Mithramaa Mithramaa"	S. P. Balasubrahmanyam, Raj Seetharam	4:34
5.	"Bhuvanam Gaganam"	S. P. Balasubrahmanyam, P. Susheela	4:30
Total length:			21:59
