= Chanti (1992 film) =

- Theatrical release poster
- Directed by: Ravi Raja Pinisetty
- Screenplay by: Ravi Raja Pinisetty
- Story by: P. Vasu
- Dialogue by: G. Satyamurthy
- Based on: Chinna Thambi
- Produced by: K. S. Rama Rao
- Starring: Venkatesh; Meena
- Cinematography: K. Ravindra Babu
- Edited by: Krishna Murthy – Siva
- Music by: Ilayaraja
- Production company: Creative Commercials
- Release date: 10 January 1992
- Running time: 139 minutes
- Country: India
- Language: Telugu
- Box office: 16.15 crores(gross)

Chanti is a 1992 Indian Telugu-language drama film directed by Ravi Raja Pinisetty. The film stars Venkatesh and Meena, with music composed by Illayaraja. The film was produced by K. S. Rama Rao under the Creative Commercials banner. The film is a remake of the 1991 Tamil film Chinna Thambi. The make-up artist P. Sobhalatha received Nandi Award for the film. The film was a hit at the box office.

It was the first film to cross 100 days in more than 40 direct centers, an industry record at that time. It won four Nandi Awards.

== Plot ==
The story begins with the birth of a baby girl, Nandini, into a family of feudal landlords (Zamindars) whose word is law for the villagers who work on their land. Nandini's three brothers throw a feast in honour of her birth. The young son of the local singer (who had died) is brought in to sing for the event. The three brothers raise Nandini like their own child as their parents had died. At the age of 5, an astrologer predicts that Nandini will bring much happiness to the family, but her marriage will be based on her choice and not the choice of her brothers. This angers the brothers and to prevent this from happening, she is raised within the confines of the house. She is home-schooled and when she does go out, all the men are warned to hide from Nandini and that glimpsing Nandini will bring them with dire consequences.

Nandini reaches puberty. The few men allowed around her are the service staff and her bodyguards. Meanwhile, the boy who sang, Chanti grows up to be a naive and gullible simpleton with a heart of gold. He is raised by his widowed mother Kanthamma. He does not go to school and spends his time singing and entertaining the people of the village.

One day the bodyguards get into a fight with Chanti who beats them up. Impressed with Chanti's naivete and fighting skills, the brothers hire Chanti to be Nandini's bodyguard and butler. Nandini meanwhile starts to resent her lack of freedom. She cons Chanti to show her the village without her brothers' knowledge. Chanti complies with her wishes and shows her the village which results in Nandini falling ill. Chanti is blamed for Nandini getting sick and gets beaten up by the brothers. Nandini, who has just started to like Chanti, feels guilty for being the reason for him getting thrashed. She shares her medicine with Chanti who inadvertently equates Nandini to his mother, as being the few people who truly care for him. This incident brings them closer together emotionally. Nandini realises she is now in love with Chanti.

One day, a factory worker is punished for leering at Nandini. He plots to kill Nandini at the inauguration of the new factory owned by her brothers. Chanti overhears the plot, and in a desperate attempt to save Nandini, lunges towards her and inadvertently feels her up in public. Nandini doesn't mind and defends Chanti by arguing that Chanti wouldn't do something like that in public. But her brothers are enraged. They beat him to the point that they almost kill him. Nandini stops them and gives him a chance to explain. When Chanti explains the situation they hang their heads in shame. Chanti quits his job on the spot, despite Nandini's silent apology. That night Nandini decides to meet Chanti and apologise and perhaps convince him to come back to the job. Chanti refuses to come back as he doesn't want to put up with the violent nature of her brothers. She thinks if Chanti marries her, they won't be able to manhandle Chanti. She convinces Chanti to tie a wedding thread around her neck which will protect him from her brothers. Chanti, without realizing the sanctity of the act, does as told and doesn't realise he is now married to her.

Chanti returns to work and is given a more respect by the brothers for saving Nandini's life. Nandini too starts emulating her sisters-in-law in taking care of her husband. This makes Chanti nervous, but he still remains clueless. Meanwhile, her change in behaviour is noticed by her sister-in-law who urges the brothers to get Nandini married off before the situation gets any worse. Nandini, realising that they are trying to get her married, tries to make Chanti understand that they are already married. Chanti refuses to listen and runs away to his mother who upon realising what has happened pulls him out of denial. She sends him away from the village in an attempt to protect him.

The brothers come to know what's happened and try to harass the mother to get her to reveal where her son is hiding. She is saved in time by her son who almost kills the brothers. The wives of the brothers stop him from killing them and ask him to save Nandini who, upon hearing the cruel acts of her brothers, has resorted to self-destruction. Chanti rushes back to save his wife and revives her with his singing. The movie ends with Nandini's recovery.

== Cast ==
- Venkatesh as Chanti
- Meena as Nandini
- Nassar as Pedababu, Nandini's eldest brother
- Sujatha as Kanthamma, Chanti's mother (Voice Dubbed by Saritha)
- Manjula Vijayakumar as Pedababu's wife
- Brahmanandam as Cook Subbaiyah
- Allu Ramalingaiah as Subbaiyah's father-in-law
- Vinod as Nandini's second elder brother
- Prasanna Kumar as Nandini's third elder brother
- Maharshi Raghava as Madman
- Kallu Chidambaram as Servant
- Jeeth Mohan Mitra as Astrologer
- Badi Tataji as Servant
- C. K. Saraswathi as Villager
- Sudha Rani as Nandini's sister-in-law
- Sharmili as Ganga
- MasterRaghavendra as Young Chanti
- Baby Srilekha as Young Nandini
- Baby Monica as Young Nandini
- Baby Saride Priyanka as Young Nandini

== Production ==
K. S. Ramarao who saw the film Chinna Thambi bought the remake rights to do it in Telugu. He initially selected Rajendra Prasad and Kushboo as the lead pair but he eventually selected Venkatesh.

== Soundtrack ==
Chanti

Film score by Ilaiyaraaja
- Released: 1992
- Genre: Soundtrack
- Length: 33:04
- Label: LEO Audio
- Producer: Ilaiyaraaja

Ilaiyaraaja chronology
April 1 Vidudala (1992)	Chanti (1992)	Chinarayudu (1992)

Music composed by Ilaiyaraaja. Music released on LEO Audio Company.

No.	Title	Lyrics	Singer(s)	Length
1.	"Annula Minnula"	Sahithi	S. P. Balasubrahmanyam	4:51
2.	"Enneno Andalu"	Veturi	K. S. Chithra, S. P. Balasubrahmanyam	4:48
3.	"Idi Thailam"	Veturi	S. P. Balasubrahmanyam	5:01
4.	"Jabiliki Vennelaki (M)"	Sahithi	S. P. Balasubrahmanyam	2:36
5.	"O Prema (F)"	Veturi	K. S. Chithra	5:06
6.	"Pavuraniki Panjaraniki"	Veturi	S. P. Balasubrahmanyam	4:45
7.	"Jabiliki Vennelaki (F)"	Sahithi	K. S. Chithra	2:39
8.	"O Prema (M)"	Veturi	S. P. Balasubrahmanyam	3:00
Total length:				33:04

== Box office ==
The film is said to have grossed around Rs 16.15 crore.

== Awards ==
Nandi Awards

- Best Lyricist – Veturi
- Best Male Playback Singer – S. P. Balasubrahmanyam
- Best Makeup Artist – Shobalatha
- Best Villain – Nassar
