= Pedarayudu =

1995 Indian Telugu-language drama film

- Film poster
- Directed by: Ravi Raja Pinisetty
- Written by: G. Satyamurthy (dialogues); Ravi Raja Pinisetty (screenplay)
- Story by: Erode Soundar
- Based on: Nattamai by Erode Sounder
- Produced by: Mohan Babu
- Starring: Mohan Babu; Bhanupriya; Soundarya
- Cinematography: K. S. Prakash Rao
- Edited by: Gautham Raju
- Music by: Koti
- Production company: Sree Lakshmi Prasanna Pictures
- Release date: 15 June 1995
- Running time: 164 minutes
- Country: India
- Language: Telugu

Pedarayudu is a 1995 Indian Telugu-language drama film directed and co-written by Ravi Raja Pinisetty. It is a remake of the 1994 Tamil film Nattamai and stars Mohan Babu in the lead in a dual role as the title character and another character, while Bhanupriya and Soundarya appear in other prominent roles with Rajinikanth appears in a special appearance. For his role, Mohan Babu won the Best Actor - Telugu at South Filmfare Awards. It also marks Rajinikanth's last proper Telugu film to focus on Tamil cinema. The film was an Industry Hit.

== Plot ==
Pedarayudu is a kindhearted and disciplined man. He sits on the ancestral throne in his village to do justice. He hears all the cases and gives solutions to the people and punishments to the wrongdoers. His wife Lakshmi admires and respects him. His brothers Raja and Ravindra fear him but also have a lot of respect for him as he has brought them up as his children. Raja marries Bharathi, the daughter of an industrialist. She initially dislikes Pedarayudu because of his verdicts and attitude and her husband for being so timid with his brother but later transforms after learning of the former's greatness from her father. Ravindra loves his paternal cousin, Bhupathi's daughter.

In the flashback, Paparayudu, Pedarayadu's father, orders Bhupathi to marry his servant's daughter whom he raped, though he is his sister's son. His brother-in-law shoots him as he is disappointed by his verdict. Enraged, Paparayudu gives his final verdict before dying to abandon their family, and whoever visits his house will receive the same punishment and also not to share even a glass of water with them. Paparayudu also tells Pedarayudu that whenever someone gives a wrong verdict, they die at that moment. The moment when he says that, he dies.

Bhupathi builds envy on his uncle's family and waits for an opportunity to take revenge on them. He hires a woman as the village school teacher and asks her to make Raja fall for her. She does so to save her father, who is in the hands of Bhupathi. He kills her and makes the villagers believe that Raja has committed the murder. Pedarayudu sentences ten years of exile for his brother's family. Bhupathi learns of his daughter's love and tries to kill Ravindra, with the help of his goons. Raja goes in rescue of him, and a pregnant Bharathi goes to Pedarayudu to convey this message. While Raja starts to take revenge on Bhupathi, Pedarayudu's aunt rushes to Pedarayudu and kills Bhupathi. She finally reveals the truth to Pedarayudu and tells him that he punished his innocent brother without committing any mistake. She also tells him that all the crimes blamed on Raja were really perpetrated by Bhupathi. Pedarayudu dies upon learning that he gave a wrong verdict, and Raja is shown taking his place on the throne.

== Cast ==
- Mohan Babu in a dual role as
  - Pedarayudu
  - Raja
- Raja Ravindra as Ravindra
- Bhanupriya as Lakshmi
- Soundarya as Bharathi
- Subhashri as Teacher
- Anandaraj as Bhupathi
- Jayanthi as Paparayudu's sister and Pedarayudu's aunt
- Brahmanandam as Dhanush
- Chalapathi Rao as Bhupathi's father
- M. S. Narayana as Acharya
- Babu Mohan as Dhanush's father
- Master Mahendra
- Manchu Manoj as Young Raja
- Kaikala Satyanarayana as Bharathi's father
- Rajinikanth as Paparayudu (special appearance; voice dubbed by P. Sai Kumar)

== Production ==
Rajinikanth who saw Tamil film Nattamai recommended Mohan Babu to watch the film. Impressed by the film, Babu decided to remake the film in Telugu with himself in lead role. N. T. Rama Rao attended the launch and clapped the board for the first shot where Mohan Babu puts garland on Rajinikanth. The launch event also saw D. Ramanaidu, Nageswara Rao and Dasari Narayana Rao attending it. Ravi Raja Pinisetty was chosen to be the film's director. Mohan Babu initially agreed to cast Bhanupriya for elder character's wife but later got opinions from people around him that she's "an iron leg" and thus he preferred Khushboo for the role however Pinisetty remained firm with the choice. When Rajinikanth came to know of this, he finalised Bhanupriya for the role. The film was shot at Rajahmundry, East Godavari district. Rajinikanth did a special appearance as Paparayudu reprising the role originally enacted by Vijayakumar in the original. The dubbing voice for Rajinikanth was given by Saikumar.

== Music ==
Music for Pedarayudu was composed by Koti.

No.	Title	Lyrics	Singer(s)	Length
1.	"Dhama Dhama"	Samavedam Shanmukha Sarma	S. P. Balasubrahmanyam, K. S. Chithra
2.	"Koo Annadoyi"	Bhuvana Chandra	S. P. Balasubrahmanyam, K. S. Chithra
3.	"Kadile Kalama"	Sriharsha	K. J. Yesudas, K. S. Chithra
4.	"Abba Dani Soku"	Bhuvana Chandra	S. P. Balasubrahmanyam, K. S. Chithra
5.	"Bavavi Nuvvu"	Bhuvana Chandra	S. P. Balasubrahmanyam, K. S. Chitra
