= Sathyam Shivam Sundaram (1987 film) =

- Poster
- Directed by: K. S. R. Das
- Written by: Kunigal Vasanth
- Screenplay by: K. S. R. Das
- Story by: Ravi Raja Pinisetty
- Based on: Jwala (Telugu)(1985)
- Produced by: G. R. K. Raju
- Starring: Vishnuvardhan; Radhika; Sumithra; Vajramuni
- Cinematography: V. Lakshman
- Edited by: Nageshwara Rao
- Music by: K. Chakravarthy
- Production company: Vishwachithra Productions
- Release date: 3 December 1987
- Running time: 136 minutes
- Country: India
- Language: Kannada

Sathyam Shivam Sundaram (transl. The Truth, the God, the Beauty) is a 1987 Indian Kannada-language film directed by K. S. R. Das and produced by G. R. K. Raju. The film stars Vishnuvardhan, Radhika, Sumithra and Vajramuni. The film has musical score by K. Chakravarthy. The movie is a remake of 1985 Telugu movie Jwala. However, while the hero played dual role in the original, Vishnuvardhan played a triple role including the father's role.

== Cast ==
- Vishnuvardhan as Sathyaraj, Shivaraj and Sundaraj
- Radhika as Geetha, Shivaraj's wife
- Sumithra as Janaki, Sathyaraj's wife
- Keerthi as Sundaraj’s love interest
- Vajramuni as Mahabala Rao
- Sudheer as Vishwapathi
- N. S. Rao
- Ravikiran
- K. S. Ashwath in Guest Appearance
- Lokanath in Guest Appearance
- Master Manjunath in Guest Appearance

== Soundtrack ==
The music was composed by K. Chakravarthy.

No.	Song	Singers	Lyrics	Length (m:ss)
1	"Dwesha Bandaaga"	S. P. Balasubrahmanyam	Chi. Udaya Shankar	04:34
2	"Nanna Singariye"	S. P. Balasubrahmanyam	Chi. Udaya Shankar	04:31
3	"Ide Reethi Yendu"	S. P. Balasubrahmanyam, K. S. Chithra	Chi. Udaya Shankar	04:13
4	"Yeneno Kanasu Kande"	K. S. Chithra	R. N. Jayagopal	03:58
5	"Naguthiruva Hoovagi"	S. P. Balasubrahmanyam, Ramani	Chi. Udaya Shankar	04:25
