= Bangaru Bullodu (1993 film) =

1993 film by Ravi Raja Pinisetty

- Theatrical release poster
- Directed by: Ravi Raja Pinisetty
- Screenplay by: Satya Murthy
- Story by: Padma Kumar
- Produced by: V. B. Rajendra Prasad
- Starring: Nandamuri Balakrishna; Ramya Krishna; Raveena Tandon
- Cinematography: Sarath
- Edited by: Gautham Raju
- Music by: Raj–Koti
- Production company: Jagapathi Art Pictures
- Release date: 3 September 1993
- Running time: 143 minutes
- Country: India
- Language: Telugu

Bangaru Bullodu (transl. The Gold Bull) is a 1993 Indian Telugu-language action drama film, produced by V. B. Rajendra Prasad under the Jagapathi Art Pictures banner and directed by Ravi Raja Pinisetty. It stars Nandamuri Balakrishna, Ramya Krishna and Raveena Tandon. Raj–Koti composed the music. It marks Raveena Tandon's debut in Telugu cinema. The film was released the same day as Nippu Ravva, which also starred Balakrishna. The film was a box-office hit.

The film was dubbed and released in Hindi as Ek Anari Do Khiladi on 26 April 1996.

== Plot ==
The film begins with a terrorist, Nana, abducting a group of school children. He holds them hostage and demands that his brother Chinna be released in exchange. DIG Banerjee rescues the children, and in the ensuing fight, Chinna dies. Nana vows to avenge his brother by wiping out DIG Banerjee’s entire clan.

Next, the story shifts to a village named Pudipalli adjacent to the river Godavari. Here, Balakrishna, aka Balayya, lives with his mother Annapurnamma. He constantly clashes with his maternal uncle Ramadasu. Ramadasu’s daughter Rani is in love with Balayya and fights with any woman she suspects of getting close to him.

Priya, the daughter of Ram Mohan Rao, who is Annapurnamma’s cousin, arrives in the village with her companion Tulasamma. Balayya becomes infatuated with her, much to the anger of Rani. Rani tells off Priya, which irks her, and she ends up challenging Rani that she will make Balaiah fall in love with her. Priya and Rani compete with each other to draw Balaiah’s attention to themselves. Balaiah falls for Priya’s act and begins to love her sincerely. Priya, to prove to Rani how intensely Balaiah loves her, asks him to recover her ring from an anthill. He does so, but is bitten by a snake. Seeing him suffer, Priya feels remorse and discloses how she and Rani have been playing with his affection. This enrages Balayya, and he forcibly ties the wedding chain Mangalasutram to Priya’s neck as a form of retribution. Priya does not want to be married to Balayya, and it is revealed that Tulasamma is a police officer who is actually here to protect Priya. She asks Priya to be patient for the time being. When Tulasamma is speaking to Commissioner Srikanth, Ramadasu overhears their conversation and starts to blackmail them, but he is imprisoned before he can cause any mischief. Rani is remorseful for her part in the situation, and both she and Annapurnamma sincerely wish Balayya and Priya to be happy together.

Meanwhile, some miscreants come searching for Priya. They try to abduct her, but Balayya protects her. Priya begins to fall in love with him, but he does not reciprocate. He soon grows suspicious of the true identity of Priya and Tulasamma. He eventually learns the truth from the latter that Priya is not his cousin. She is a member of DIG Banerjee’s family. Nana massacred the entire family to avenge the death of his brother, but Priya managed to survive the attack. Tulasamma, who was a friend of the family as well as a colleague of Banerjee, took Priya away with the help of Commissioner Srikanth and hid her at Pudipalli, which is incidentally Nana’s own village, where he is unlikely to look for the girl. Balayya swears to protect Priya and declares his love for her.

Nana, who is in the same jail as Ramadasu, finds out the whereabouts of Priya from him and breaks out of jail to complete his vengeance. It is also revealed that Commissioner Srikanth lusts after Priya and threatens to harm Thulasamma if she does not agree to his advances. Balayya fights with both Nana and Commissioner Srikanth, defeating them. The movie ends on a happy note with the official marriage of Balayya and Priya, wherein Priya squabbles with Rani over a glass of milk to be taken to Balaiah for their wedding night.

== Cast ==
- Nandamuri Balakrishna as Bala Krishna aka Balaiah
- Ramya Krishna as Rani (Voice dubbed by Saritha)
- Raveena Tandon as Priya (Voice dubbed by Durga)
- Rao Gopal Rao as Ramadasu
- Allu Ramalingaiah as Kannappa
- Sharat Saxena as Commissioner Srikanth
- Devan as DIG Benerjee
- Devaraj as Nana
- Brahmanandam as Prisoner
- Babu Mohan as Paatha dasu
- Annapurna as Annapurnamma
- Srividya as Tulasamma
- Anitha as Ramadasu's wife
- Master Baladitya

== Production ==
The film was shot at Poodipalli village at Devipatnam.

== Soundtrack ==
Bangaru Bullodu

Film score by Raj–Koti
- Released: 1993
- Genre: Soundtrack
- Length: 32:19
- Label: Lahari Music
- Producer: Raj–Koti

Raj–Koti chronology
Muta Mestri (1993)	Bangaru Bullodu (1993)	Mechanic Alludu (1993)

Music was composed by Raj–Koti. Music released on Lahari Music Company. Raj- Koti reused "Adivi deviya" from Kannada film Rayaru Bandaru Mavane manage for Manasu Agadu. The song "Swatilo Muthyamantha" was recreated in 2021 film of same name.

Telugu
No.	Title	Lyrics	Singer(s)	Length
1.	"Gudivada Gummaro"	Bhuvanachandra	S. P. Balasubrahmanyam, Chitra	6:24
2.	"Ennetlo Chapesi"	Veturi	S. P. Balasubrahmanyam, Chitra	4:54
3.	"Thathiginathom"	Bhuvanachandra	Mano, Chitra, Minmini	5:02
4.	"Swathilo Muthyamantha"	Veturi	S. P. Balasubrahmanyam, Chitra	5:10
5.	"Manasu Aagadu"	Veturi	S. P. Balasubrahmanyam, S. P. Sailaja	5:51
Total length:				32:19

Later The movie was dubbed into Tamil as Thanga Pandi. Lyrics were written by Vairamuthu.

Tamil (Dubbed version)
No.	Title	Singer(s)	Length
1.	"Sugamana Kumariyo"	S. P. Balasubrahmanyam, S.P. Sailaja	6:24
2.	"Yethetho Nee"	S. P. Balasubrahmanyam, Minmini	4:54
3.	"Thathiginathom"	S.P. Balasubramaniam, Sujatha Mohan, Minmini	5:02
4.	"Ennavo Panna Cholli"	S. P. Balasubrahmanyam, Sujatha	5:10
5.	"Manasu Tharikkuthu"	S. P. Balasubrahmanyam, S. P. Sailaja	5:51
Total length:			32:19

== Release ==
Bangaru Bullodu was released on 3 September 1993 alongside Nippu Ravva on the same day and became successful at box-office.
