= Adhipathi =

2001 film by Ravi Raja Pinisetty

- Poster
- Directed by: Ravi Raja Pinisetty
- Written by: Paruchuri Brothers (dialogues)
- Screenplay by: Ravi Raja Pinisetty
- Story by: Ranjith
- Based on: Narasimham (Malayalam)
- Produced by: Mohan Babu
- Starring: Mohan Babu; Nagarjuna; Soundarya; Preeti Jhangiani
- Cinematography: V. Jayaram
- Edited by: Gautham Raju
- Music by: Koti
- Production company: Sree Lakshmi Prasanna Pictures
- Release date: 19 September 2001
- Running time: 152 minutes
- Country: India
- Language: Telugu

Adhipathi (transl. Ruler) is a 2001 Indian Telugu-language action drama film directed by Ravi Raja Pinisetty and produced by Mohan Babu under his Sree Lakshmi Prasanna Pictures banner. It stars Mohan Babu, Nagarjuna, Preeti Jhangiani and Soundarya, with music composed by Koti. The film is a remake of the Malayalam film Narasimham (2000).

== Cast ==
- Mohan Babu as Yogindra / Yogi
- Nagarjuna as Jagan
- Preeti Jhangiani as Anuradha
- Soundarya as Jagan's fiancé
- Mukesh Rishi as Dunnapothula Dharma Rao
- Vijayakumar as Justice Panduranga Rao
- Dasari Narayana Rao as Judge
- Kota Srinivasa Rao as Gnaneswara Rao
- Brahmanandam as S.I. Pathodi
- Ali
- Narra Venkateswara Rao as Dunnapothula Janardhan Rao
- Seema as Thulasi
- Raghunatha Reddy as Kaasi Visweswara Rao
- Suthi Velu as Satya Murthy
- Brahmaji as Yogi's friend
- Tanikella Bharani as Lawyer
- Banerjee as S.P. Ashok
- Venniradai Nirmala as Lakshmi
- Jayalalita as Mangala
- Jaya Prakash Reddyas Surya Prakash
- L. B. Sriram as Papa Rao
- Mohan Raj as Gajendra
- M. S. Narayana
- AVS
- Chitti Babu
- Kazan Khan as C.I. Shankar Narayan
- Navabharat Balaji as Krishna Murthy
- Gadiraju Subba Rao
- Y. Vijaya
- Devisri
- Shobha Rani
- Aruna Charlla
- Uma Chowdary
- Alphonsa as item number

== Music ==
Adhipathi

Film score by Koti
- Released: 2001
- Genre: Soundtrack
- Length: 28:51
- Label: TIPS Audio
- Producer: Koti

Koti chronology
Repallelo Radha (2001)	Adhipathi (2001)	Sandade Sandadi (2002)

Music for the film was composed by Koti. Audio soundtrack was released on TIPS Audio Company. Telugucinema wrote "The compositions in this movie cast a doubt on Koti's creativity! No tune gives a fresh feeling when heard. The "theme music" included makes one wonder how that can be called so! Koti could have done a lot better job than this. The songs are mostly based on beat, and are typically mass-oriented - the choice of lyricists proves that too!".

No.	Title	Lyrics	Singer(s)	Length
1.	"Puvvulanadugu"	Bhuvanachandra	Udit Narayan, KS Chitra	4:30
2.	"Abbabba Tuntari Gaali"	Bhuvanachandra	Kumar Sanu, KS Chitra	5:35
3.	"Kadapalo Kannesa"	Bhuvanachandra	Udit Narayan, KS Chitra	3:56
4.	"Aada Bratuke"	Ande Sri	Shankar Mahadevan	4:07
5.	"Aasa Padutunnadi"	Bhuvanachandra	Sukhwinder Singh, KS Chitra	5:42
6.	"Panchadara Patikabellam"	Suddala Ashok Teja	Shankar Mahadevan, Radhika	5:01
Total length:				28:51

== Reception ==
Idlebrain wrote "The first half of the film is very ordinary and second half of it is OK. Touted as a multi-starrer, Adhipati fails to impress the viewers. The producer seems to have made this film keeping the success of Narasimha Naidu in mind. They have selected the same set of artists (Mukesh Rushi, Jaya Prakash Reddy as villains and Preethi as heroine) and dialogue writer and tried to emulate the formula of Narasimha Naidu. What this film lacks is powerful screenplay and pulsating direction". Telugucinema wrote "Basically this is the story with many unexpected twists and turns. It is of course different from today's flow of teenage love stories. It's a theme packed with action, loaded with sentiment thus giving a lot of scope for so-called action. But the problem arises when the director can not think beyond the formula, that they think has ruled and will rule the films. The routine trivial love track, the ill-mannered humor, and mannerism-oriented performance make the film shallow and unbearable despite the gripping thread in the story. And there is no clue why the film is titled as Adhipathi".
