= Nari Nari Naduma Murari =

1990 Indian film by A. Kodandarami Reddy

- Theatrical release poster
- Directed by: A. Kodandarami Reddy
- Written by: Tanikella Bharani; Bhamidipati Radha Krishna; G. Satyamurthy; Vinayaka Sarma (dialogues)
- Screenplay by: A. Kodandarami Reddy
- Story by: Yuva Chithra Arts Unit
- Produced by: K. Murari
- Starring: Nandamuri Balakrishna; Shobana; Nirosha
- Cinematography: A. Vincent; Ajayan Vincent
- Edited by: Gautham Raju
- Music by: K. V. Mahadevan
- Production company: Yuva Chithra Arts
- Release date: 27 April 1990
- Running time: 138 minutes
- Country: India
- Language: Telugu

Nari Nari Naduma Murari (transl. Lord Krishna in between two ladies) is a 1990 Telugu-language romantic comedy film directed by A. Kodandarami Reddy. The film was produced by K. Murari under the Yuva Chitra Arts banner. It stars Nandamuri Balakrishna, Shobana and Nirosha, with music composed by K. V. Mahadevan. This is Balakrishna's 50th film and it was a Super Hit at the box office. During the pre-climax scene, Balakrishna does not appear for more than 20 minutes, which is uncommon in commercial Telugu films.

== Plot ==
The film begins in Nakkabokkalapaadu, where a lofty woman, Sesharatnam, prioritises outward beauty. She dispises her henpecked husband, Veerabhadraiah, as he has a second wife, Nagamani. Before his marriage to Sesharatnam, he loved Nagamani, but by force of his mother Janakamma, he wed Sesharatnam. Later, the truth is out when Sesharatnam rebukes, ostracizes her mother-in-law, and stays away from Veerabhadraiah. The couple has two daughters, Shobha, a homely woman & Neeraja "Neeru", a naughty modern youngster. Veerabhadraiah aspires to marry off his daughter to his nephew Venkateswara Rao "Venkanna" to unite the families. Sesharatnam inadvertently rejects the alliance. So, Veerabhadraiah gives rise to Venkanna, who words his grandmother to nuptials one of his cousins and rectifies his mother-in-law. Now, Venkanna lands at their village, where Sesharatnam vilifies him and challenges her to splice his daughter.

From there, he becomes operational in attempts to woo Shobha & Neeru in various skirmishes and teases Sesharatnam. Parallelly, Veerabhadraiah is blackmailed by Appadu as he upholds a secret. Once, Venkanna accuses himself of protecting his honor when Shobha endears him. Plus, a series of donnybrooks run between Venkanna & Neeru, and she, too, likes him. Out of the blue, the two struck Venkanna, proclaiming that they would not survey without him. Now, the story takes several twists and turns, which ends hilariously. Being conscious of the ongoing, Sesharatnam rebukes and smacks her daughters when Veerabhadraiah hinders and states one of the two is not her own. Afterward, he narrates that one is the progeny of Nagamani. The two delivered at the same time. Sesharatnam gave birth to twins and lost a baby, which Veerabhadraiah recouped with Nagamani's daughter.

Today, Sesharatnam proceeds to Janakamma and Shobha & Neeru to Nagamani to be aware of actuality. Then, Janakamma replies she also doesn't know it. Besides, Nagamani answers that the woman who shares love & affection with anyone is only the mother and asks them to retrieve. Listening to it, Sesharatnam embraces her daughters and is much obliged to Nagamani. The elders leave the decision to the kids, who will wedlock Venkanna when the sibling asks to make his choice, and he is bewildered. At last, Venkanna rushes to Venkateswara, where the Lord affirms that he is waiting to perceive the answer to the same question which he is unable to provide to his wives Sridevi and Bhudevi. Shobha & Neeru is approaching him, but he cannot respond. Finally, the movie ends happily, with Venkanna fusing with the two.

== Cast ==
- Nandamuri Balakrishna as Venkateswara Rao / Venkanna
- Shobana as Shobha
- Nirosha as Neeru
- Sarada as Sesharatnam
- Kaikala Satyanarayana as Veerabhadrayya
- Allu Ramalingaiah as Sarva Rayudu
- Tanikella Bharani as Bhairava Menon
- Babu Mohan
- Ananth
- Chitti Babu
- Chidatala Appa Rao as Swamiji
- Potti Prasad as Census Officer
- Vankayala Satyanayana
- Anjali Devi as Janikamma
- Rama Prabha as Venkamma / Raja Hamsa
- Sri Lakshmi as Devakanya
- Mamatha as Devakanya
- Kalpana Rai as S. I. Sukumari

== Production ==
The film was shot in Gobichettipalayam.

== Soundtrack ==
Nari Nari Naduma Murari

Film score by K. V. Mahadevan
- Released: 1990
- Genre: Soundtrack
- Length: 29:23
- Label: Lahari Music
- Producer: K. V. Mahadevan

K. V. Mahadevan chronology
Muddula Mavayya (1989)	Nari Nari Naduma Murari (1990)	Muddula Menalludu (1990)

Music composed by K. V. Mahadevan. Music released on Lahari Music Company. The song "Em Vaana" was inspired by the Tamil song "Naan Thedum Sevvanthi", composed by Ilaiyaraaja for Dharma Pathini (1986).

No.	Title	Lyrics	Singer(s)	Length
1.	"Iruvuru Bhamala"	credited as Acharya Aatreya, but actually written by Veturi	S. P. Balasubrahmanyam, P Susheela	5:33
2.	"Yem Vaano"	Sirivennela Sitarama Sastry	S. P. Balasubrahmanyam, P Susheela	4:25
3.	"Manasuloni"	Tyagaraja Swamy	S. P. Balasubrahmanyam, P Susheela	4:10
4.	"Vayasu Sogasu"	Sirivennela Sitarama Sastry	S. P. Balasubrahmanyam, P Susheela	5:23
5.	"Pellantune Vedekkinde"	Sirivennela Sitarama Sastry	S. P. Balasubrahmanyam, P Susheela	5:23
6.	"Duttaagunnaave Rattammattaa"	Veturi	S. P. Balasubrahmanyam	4:06
Total length:				29:23

== Reception ==
Griddaluru Gopalrao of Zamin Ryot wrote his review on 4 May 1990, criticised the film and called it "an absolute crappy film full of ins and outs".
