= Janaki Ramudu =

- Theatrical release poster
- Directed by: K. Raghavendra Rao
- Written by: Satyanand (dialogues)
- Screenplay by: K. Murari; K. Raghavendra Rao
- Story by: Siva Shakthi Datta; V. Vijayendra Prasad
- Produced by: K. Murari
- Starring: Nagarjuna; Vijayashanti; Jeevitha
- Cinematography: K. S. Prakash
- Edited by: Gautham Raju
- Music by: K. V. Mahadevan
- Production company: Yuva Chitra Arts
- Release date: 19 August 1988
- Running time: 133 minutes
- Country: India
- Language: Telugu

Janaki Ramudu is a 1988 Indian Telugu-language film directed by K. Raghavendra Rao and produced by K. Murari under Yuva Chitra Arts. The film stars Nagarjuna, Vijayashanti and Jeevitha, with music composed by K. V. Mahadevan. It was dubbed into Tamil as Idhaya Devathai. The film was influenced by Mooga Manasulu (1964).

== Cast ==
- Nagarjuna as Ramu / Ranga
- Vijayashanti as Janaki / Lakshmi (Voice Dubbed by Saritha)
- Jeevitha as Abaddala Satyavathi (Voice Dubbed by Roja Ramani)
- Satyanarayana as Ramu's Father
- Jaggayya as Raghavayah
- Mohan Babu as Balavantha Rao
- Pradeep Shakthi as Bhupathi
- Chalapathi Rao as Kathula Narasimha Bhupathi
- Brahmanandam as Rangam Singaraju
- Sakshi Rangarao as Satyavathi's Father
- Suthivelu as Hanumanthu
- Bhimeswara Rao as Doctor
- Vankayala Satyanayana as Priest
- Chidatala Appa Rao as Sambo Siva Shankar Sastry
- Shubha as Annapurnamma
- Kakinada Syamala as Durgamma
- Chandrika as Mangala
- Sri Lakshmi as Balavantha Rao's Keep
- Kalpana Rai as Principal

== Soundtrack ==
Janaki Ramudu

Film score by K. V. Mahadevan
- Released: 1988
- Genre: Soundtrack
- Length: 28:04
- Label: LEO Audio
- Producer: K. V. Mahadevan

K. V. Mahadevan chronology
Murali Krishnudu (1988)	Janaki Ramudu (1988)	Muddula Mavayya (1988)

Music composed by K. V. Mahadevan . Music released on LEO Audio Company.

No.	Title	Lyrics	Singer(s)	Length
1.	"Na Gonthu Sruthilona"	Acharya Aatreya	S. P. Balasubrahmanyam, Chitra	4:14
2.	"Ni Charanam Kamalam"	Veturi	S. P. Balasubrahmanyam, S. Janaki	5:25
3.	"Adirindhi Mama"	Acharya Aatreya	S. P. Balasubrahmanyam, P. Susheela	4:30
4.	"Arere Dhadapetti Pothundi"	Sirivennela	S. P. Balasubrahmanyam, P. Susheela	4:39
5.	"Chilaka Pachha Thotalo"	Veturi	S. P. Balasubrahmanyam, Chitra	4:37
6.	"Evarini Adagali"	Sirivennela	S. P. Balasubrahmanyam, P. Susheela	5:44
Total length:				28:04

== Awards ==
- S. Janaki won Nandi Award for Best Female Playback Singer for the song "Nee Charana Kamalam Mrudulam"
