= Khudgarz =

1987 film by Rakesh Roshan

- Poster
- Directed by: Rakesh Roshan
- Screenplay by: Mohan Kaul; Ravi Kapoor
- Story by: Rakesh Roshan
- Produced by: Rakesh Roshan
- Starring: Jeetendra; Shatrughan Sinha; Bhanupriya; Amrita Singh; Govinda; Neelam
- Cinematography: Pushpal Dutta
- Edited by: Nand Kumar
- Music by: Rajesh Roshan
- Production company: Filmkraft
- Release date: 31 July 1987
- Running time: 158 minutes
- Country: India
- Language: Hindi

Khudgarz (transl. Selfish) is a 1987 Indian Hindi-language action drama film, produced and directed by Rakesh Roshan under the Filmkraft banner. It features an ensemble cast of Jeetendra, Shatrughan Sinha, Govinda, Bhanupriya, Amrita Singh and Neelam Kothari with music composed by Rajesh Roshan. The film marks the directorial debut of actor Rakesh Roshan.

The film was remade in Telugu in 1988 as Prana Snehithulu, in Tamil in 1992 as Annaamalai (which went on to be remade in Telugu in 1993 as Kondapalli Raja and in Kannada in 2003 as Gokarna). The film has been claimed to be based on Jeffrey Archer's 1979 novel Kane and Abel.

== Plot ==
When Amar requests Bihari to sell the land, the latter agrees because they go back a long way. However, at the behest of Brij Bhushan, the agreement is drafted in a way that Amar and Brij Bhushan become the sole owners of the land. Bihari loses his ancestral property.

Amar believes Sudhir and pleads for forgiveness from Bihari, offering to rebuild the structure for him. However Bihari does not relent and declares that he will himself build a chain of hotels and outshine Amar one day.

As luck would have it, the son and daughter of Amar and Bihari respectively fall in love with each other, despite knowing about the enmity of their respective families. Bihari's wife, Lata decides to pay a visit to Amar's house before things get out of hand. She then overhears a conversation and learns that the loans with which Bihari could grow and prosper were backed by Amar.

Lalita, Bihari's sister who has been suffering physical abuse at the hands of her husband Sudhir, learns that he is making plans to kill her brother. She immediately approaches Amar for the safety of Bihari.

Lata informs Bihari about how Amar has been his benefactor. Bihari is crushed on learning about this and goes to Amar and reconciles. The two friends confront Sudhir and thrash him severely but stop short of killing him because he is married to Bihari's sister Lalita.

== Cast ==
- Jeetendra as Amar Saxena
- Shatrughan Sinha as Bihari Bhuvaneshwar Prasad Sinha
- Amrita Singh as Lata Sinha
- Bhanupriya as Jaya Saxena
- Govinda as Kumar Saxena
- Neelam as Jyoti Sinha
- Sushma Seth as Seeta Sinha
- Kader Khan as Advocate Bheemji Kanji Batliwala
- Saeed Jaffrey as Brij Bhushan Saxena
- Kiran Kumar as Sudhir
- Rahul Singh (Master Rinku) as Young Amar Saxena
- Master Javed Hyder as Young Bihari
- Sudhir Dalvi as Deshmukh
- Praveen Kumar as Giant at Sports Club
- Ghanshyam
- Dinesh Hingoo
- Rishi Kapoor as the Singing Tramp (guest appearance)
- Abhi Bhattacharya as Minister (special appearance) who comes for inauguration of hotel
- Satyen Kappu as Dayal
- Mac Mohan
- Sujay Khanta as Drunkard

== Soundtrack ==
The songs for this movie were penned by Indivar and music composed by Rajesh Roshan.

Song	Singer
"Zindagi Ka Naam Dosti"	Nitin Mukesh
"Yahi Kahi Jiyara"	Nitin Mukesh, Sadhna Sargam
"Zindagi Ka Naam Dosti" (Duet)	Mohammed Aziz, Nitin Mukesh
"Log Kehte Hain Ke"	Mohammed Aziz, Sadhana Sargam
"Aap Ke Aa Jaane Se"	Mohammed Aziz, Sadhana Sargam
"Zindagi Ka Naam Dosti" (Sad)	Mohammed Aziz, Nitin Mukesh

== Remakes ==
Year	Film	Language	Ref.
1988	Prana Snehithulu	Telugu	
1992	Annaamalai	Tamil	
1993	Kondapalli Raja	Telugu	
2003	Gokarna	Kannada	
