= Jwala (1985 film) =

- Theatrical release poster
- Directed by: Ravi Raja Pinisetty
- Produced by: Pinjala Nageswara Rao
- Starring: Chiranjeevi; Radhika; Bhanupriya; Kannada Prabhakar
- Music by: Ilaiyaraaja
- Production company: Rachana Films
- Release date: 14 June 1985
- Country: India
- Language: Telugu

Jwala (transl. Volcano) is a 1985 Indian Telugu-language film, directed by Ravi Raja Pinisetty. The film stars Chiranjeevi in a dual role, Radhika, Bhanupriya and Kannada Prabhakar. The film's music was composed by Ilaiyaraaja. The film was dubbed in Malayalam as Prathikara Jwala and dubbed in Tamil as Thudikkum Nenjam. The film was remade in Kannada in 1987 as Sathyam Shivam Sundaram starring Vishnuvardhan in triple roles (including the role of the father) unlike in Jwala.

== Cast ==
- Chiranjeevi as Raju and Yuvaraju (Double Role)
- Radhika as Janaki
- Bhanupriya as Bhanu
- Kaikala Satyanarayana as SP Chakravarthy
- Kannada Prabhakar as Sarvottama Rao
- Gummadi
- P. Sai Kumar as Sarvottama Rao's son
- Allu Rama Lingaiah as Pattabhi
- Annapoorna as Poorna
- Silk Smitha
- Jaya Malini as Dancer in "Oka Jyothinai" Song
- J.V. Ramana Murthi
- Ceylon Manohar as Manohar
- Rallapalli
- Chitti Babu
- Vijaya Ranga Raju as Sarvottama Rao's henchman

== Soundtrack ==
The music was composed by Ilaiyaraaja.

Telugu version

No.	Song	Singers	Lyrics	Length (m:ss)
1	"Ennela Ennela"	S. Janaki	C. Narayana Reddy	
2	"Kaliki Chilaka"	S. Janaki, S. P. Balasubrahmanyam	Veturi Sundararama Murthy	
3	"Evevo Kalalu Kannanu"	S. Janaki	Mylavarapu Gopi	
4	"Talangu Dintha"	S. P. Balasubrahmanyam	Veturi Sundararama Murthy	
5	"Oka Jyothinai"	S. P. Balasubrahmanyam	Veturi Sundararama Murthy	

Tamil version

No.	Song	Singers	Length (m:ss)
1	"Irandu Kiligal"	S. P. Balasubrahmanyam, Vani Jairam	4:17
2	"Yedhedho"	Vani Jairam	3:39
3	"Thalangu Dhimitha"	S. P. Balasubrahmanyam	4:17
4	"Oru Jothi Dhaan"	S. P. Balasubrahmanyam	3:55
