= Rajadurai =

Rajadurai ராஜதுரை
- Pronunciation: Rājaturai
- Gender: Male
- Language: Tamil

Origin
- Meaning: Royal chief
- Region of origin: Southern India; North-eastern Sri Lanka

Other names
- Variant form: Rajathurai

Rajadurai or Rajathurai (Tamil: ராஜதுரை) is a Tamil male given name. Due to the Tamil tradition of using patronymic surnames it may also be a surname for males and females.

== Notable people ==
=== Given name ===
- C. Rajadurai (born 1927), Ceylonese politician

=== Surname ===
- Brian Rajadurai (born 1965), Canadian cricketer
- Perumal Rajadurai (born 1967), Sri Lankan lawyer and politician

== Other uses ==
- Rajadurai (film), 1993 Tamil film
