= Pailam Pilaga =

- Theatrical release poster
- Directed by: Anand Gurram
- Written by: Anand Gurram
- Produced by: Rama Krishna Boddula; SK Srinivas
- Starring: Sai Teja Kalvakota; Pavani Karanam; Mirchi Kiran
- Cinematography: Sandeep Baddula
- Edited by: Ravi Teja Kurmana
- Music by: Yashwanth Nag
- Production company: Happy Horse Films
- Release date: 20 September 2024
- Country: India
- Language: Telugu

Pailam Pilaga (transl. "Take care, boy") is a 2024 Indian Telugu-language comedy-drama film directed by Anand Gurram and produced by Ramakrishna Boddula and Srinivas SK under the banner of Happy Horse Films. The film stars Sai Teja Kalvakota, Pavani Karanam, and Mirchi Kiran in the lead roles, with a supporting cast including Dubbing Janaki, Chitram Srinu, and BHEL Prasad.

== Plot ==
Set in the rural village of Kothula Gutta, the story revolves around Shiva, a young man with aspirations that extend far beyond his small-town life. As he embarks on a journey to secure a job and fulfill his ambitions, the film explores whether Shiva will ultimately succeed in overcoming the challenges he faces along the way.

== Cast ==
- Sai Teja Kalvakota as Shiva
- Pavani Karanam as Devi
- Mirchi Kiran as Village Sarpanch
- Dubbing Janaki as Grandmother
- Chitram Srinu as Murthy
- BHEL Prasad as Shiva's Father
- Jaya Naidu as Shiva's Mother

== Production ==
The film was directed by Anand Gurram and produced by Ramakrishna Boddula and SK Srinivas under the banner of Happy Horse Films. Sandeep Baddula served as the director of photography (DOP), and Yashwanth Nag composed the music. Filming took place in mid-2023 in the villages around Karimnagar, Telangana, and concluded within two months. The film's editing was handled by Ravi Teja Kurmana, with additional support from Shailesh Darekar. Sound design was done by Rabeesh Edavottom and Nikhil Sebastian, while the costume design was managed by Harika Potta.

== Soundtrack ==
The film's soundtrack was composed by Yashwanth Nag. The audio rights were acquired by T-Series, and the first single was launched in Hyderabad by director Sekhar Kammula.

Track Listing
No.	Title	Lyrics	Singer(s)	Length
1.	"Sodu Sodu"	Anand Gurram	Ram Miriyala	4:22
2.	"Jai Chiranjeeva"	Traditional	Yashwanth Nag	2:02
3.	"Naalo Sagama"	Anand Gurram	K.S. Chithra	3:19
4.	"Pailam Pilaga - Male Version"	Akkala Chandra Mouli	Yashwanth Nag	3:38
5.	"Pailam Pilaga - Female Version"	Akkala Chandra Mouli	Sravana Bhargavi	5:00
6.	"Ye Nimisham"	Anand Gurram	Yashwanth Nag	3:43
Total length:				21:24

== Release and reception ==
Pailam Pilaga was released worldwide on 20 September 2024. The Hans India rated the film 3/5 and NTV Telugu rated the film 2.5/5.

=== Home media ===
Pailam Pilaga streamed on ETV Win from 10 October 2024.
