= Trisulam (film) =

1982 Indian film

- Poster
- Directed by: K. Raghavendra Rao
- Written by: Satyanand
- Produced by: K. Murari
- Starring: Krushnam Raju; Sridevi; Jayasudha; Radhika
- Music by: K.V. Mahadevan
- Release date: 1982
- Country: India
- Language: Telugu

Trisulam (transl. Trident) is a 1982 Indian Telugu-language drama film directed by K. Raghavendra Rao with screenplay by Satyanand. The film stars Krishnam Raju and Sridevi with Jayasudha, Radhika, Prabhakar Reddy, Gollapudi Maruti Rao and Rao Gopal Rao in supporting roles. The music was composed by K. V. Mahadevan. The songs "Pellante Pandillu" and "Raayini Aadadi Chesina" were chartbusters. The film was based on the novel Jagruti. It was remade in Hindi as Naya Kadam (1984).

== Cast ==
- Krishnam Raju as Ramu
  - Harish as Young Ramu
- Sridevi as Lakshmi, Hitler Raghavaiah's daughter
- Jayasudha as Neeli
- Radhika as Yadi, Ramu's cousin
- Prabhakar Reddy as Master/Teacher
- Dubbing Janaki
- Suthi Veerabhadra Rao
- Gollapudi Maruti Rao as Hitler Raghavaiah
- Rao Gopal Rao as Pentaiah
- Suthi Velu as Pentaiah's son
- Allu Rama Lingaiah as Lingam
- Chalapathi Rao as Bhadraiah
- Tulasi
- Rajya Lakshmi

== Production ==
The film was shot at Poodipalli village at Devipatnam.

== Soundtrack ==
Soundtrack was composed by K. V. Mahadevan. All Lyrics were written by Aathreya

- Veluguku Udhayam - (P. Susheela, S. P. Balasubrahmanyam)
- Pellante Pandhillu - (P Suseela, S P Baalasubrahmanyam)
- Raayini Aadadhi Chesina Raamudivaa - (P Suseela, P Baalasubrahmanyam)
- Anukoledammaa Ilaa Avuthundani - (P Suseela, S P Baalasubrahmanyam)
- Athade Vachchi (Padyam) - (S P Baalasubrahmanyam)
- Suprabhaatham Suprabhaatham - (P Suseela, S P Baalasubrahmanyam)
- Pannendellaku Pushkaraalu - (P Suseela, S P Baalasubrahmanyam)
