= Andhra Pradesh United Teachers Federation =

Indian teachers union

Andhra Pradesh United Teachers Federation a pro-Communist Party of India (Marxist) (CPI(M)) teachers union in Andhra Pradesh, India.It was a united state teachers federation of Andhra pradesh and Telangana till April 2014. United teachers federation is affiliated toState teachers Federation of India (STFI). UTF was established on 10 August 1974. Its main goal for formation was to unite all the Teachers of Andhra pradesh. It is presently working to mobilize teachers against the corporatisation and monetization of education and to safeguard public education together with the people.From regrouping scales, pay scales upgrades, aided teachers direct payments, retirement for age of 60s, geo-instruments, counseling, insignia, etc., UTF, an organization that has stood at the forefront of independence and unity to abolish the apprenticeship policy. UTF has a strong voice in society for the teachers, pensioners, school workers safeguard and government schools Development. It is an active union of teachers in development of society. It also elected Member of legislative Council (MLC's) from their Union.They have president and general secretary as their union leaders.

== Telangana State United Teachers Federation ( TSUTF ) ==
Telangana State United Teachers Federation a pro-Communist Party of India (Marxist) (CPI(M)) teachers union in Telangana, India.It is a state level teachers Union in Telangana. TSUTF was established on 13 April 2014. It has the same goals and Ideology of United Teachers Federation. Its current president is Jangaih and general secretary Ch. Ravi. It started an official monthly magazine namely " Voice of Telangana Teacher " on 22 October 2014. It has elected Teacher's MLC Alugubelli Narsireddy in warangal, Nalgonda, Khammam constituency.
