= Nandi Awards of 1991 =

Awards by Government of Andhra Pradesh

Nandi Awards presented annually by Government of Andhra Pradesh. First awarded in 1964.

== 1991 Nandi Awards Winners List ==
Category	Winner	Film
Best Feature Film	Gutha Ramineedu	Yagnam
Second Best Feature Film	Bapu	Pelli Pustakam
Third Best Feature Film	B. S. Mouli	Ashwini
