= Kane and Abel (novel) =

Novel by Jeffrey Archer

- First edition
- Author: Jeffrey Archer
- Language: English
- Publisher: Hodder & Stoughton
- Publication date: 1979
- Publication place: United Kingdom
- Media type: Print (hardcover, paperback)
- Pages: 512 pp
- ISBN: 0-340-24594-8
- OCLC: 154821398

Kane and Abel is a 1979 novel by British author Jeffrey Archer.

Released in the United Kingdom in 1979 and in the United States in February 1980, the book was an international success, selling over one million copies in its first week. It reached No. 1 on the New York Times Best Seller list. By 2009, it had sold an estimated 34 million copies worldwide.

A sequel, The Prodigal Daughter, was released in 1982 and features Abel's daughter Florentyna as the protagonist.

In 2003, Kane and Abel was listed at number 96 on the BBC's survey The Big Read. Kane & Abel is among the top 100 best-selling books in the world, with a similar number of copies sold as To Kill a Mockingbird and Gone with the Wind.

== Plot summary ==
The book tells the stories of two men born worlds apart. They have nothing in common except their date of birth (18 April 1906), the day of the San Francisco Earthquake, and a zeal to succeed in life. William Lowell Kane is the wealthy and powerful, Ivy League-educated heir to an old Boston Brahmin family, while Abel Rosnovski (originally named Władek Koskiewicz) is a Pole who was born into great poverty and eventually migrated to the United States.

William follows in the footsteps of his father, Richard Kane, to become a successful banker. A few days before William's sixth birthday, Richard dies in the Titanic disaster, leaving William fatherless and heir to the Kane & Cabot bank. William displays extraordinary discipline and intelligence as a young man at St. Paul's School and later at Harvard University. His mother, Anne, marries Henry Osborne, who turns out to be a man interested in gambling and women. William hates Henry from the beginning and spends most of the time at Harvard and at his best friend Mathew Lester's home. William then dreams of becoming the chairman of Lester's bank. Henry spends every last penny of Kane's mother's money on the pretext of speculation. Anonymous notes warn Anne (who has been impregnated by Osborne, a matter which causes William some worry—until he finds out that he can toss him out easily without any money) about her husband, whose real name is Vitorio Tossana. She hires a detective to find out the truth, and miscarries fatally from the shock, after which Kane ejects Osborne from his home.

Władek Koskiewicz is born in a forest and raised by a trapper family. When he grows up and is found to have exceptional intelligence, Baron Rosnovski asks him to become a companion to his son, Leon, so that Władek might prove to be a competition to him. Władek agrees to go to the Baron's castle on the condition that he can bring along his elder sister Florentyna. Soon afterwards, World War I breaks out. Germans attack Poland and capture the Baron, his staff, and son in his castle. Leon dies by the hand of a German soldier. Before dying, the Baron hands Władek his silver band of authority. Władek realises, in a twist, that the Baron was his father when he finds that, like him, the Baron also had a missing nipple. Florentyna, Władek's beloved sister, who was now his only family, is raped 17 times and killed brutally in front of young Władek by Russian soldiers.

Władek was then moved to Siberia from where he manages to escape to Turkey after facing many hardships. There he nearly loses his hand (a Hudud punishment for theft) for stealing food but is luckily rescued by two British diplomats, owing to the silver band given by Baron which he wore on the hand. They transfer him to the Polish consulate from where, with their help, he migrates to America and assumes the name Abel Rosnovski (as inscribed on the silver band).

He starts his life as a waiter in the Hotel Plaza, while taking night classes in economics at Columbia University. While Abel is working there, Davis Leroy, owner of the Richmond group of hotels, is impressed by his work and appoints him manager of his flagship hotel. Abel converts the ill-managed hotel to a profit-making one and buys stock in the chain. During the Great Depression, the hotel needs a backer and Davis, unable to find one, commits suicide, leaving the remaining shares in the Richmond Group to Abel. Before committing suicide, Davis mentions that Kane & Cabot was the bank that did not support him. Abel thus plans for revenge and considers Kane his arch rival who was responsible for the death of his closest friend. The bank gets him an anonymous backer. Abel assumes it to be David Maxton, owner of Stevens' hotel. During this time, Abel catches up with his old time friend, George Novak and marries Zaphia—both Polish emigres he had met on the ship-journey to the United States from Turkey in his earlier life.

Abel changes the name of the hotel from Richmond to Baron and builds up a successful hotel chain. By collaborating with Henry Osborne, who had by now entered politics, Abel plans to ruin Kane and his bank. Abel begets a daughter, named Florentyna in memory of his dead sister, while Kane has a son, Richard and two daughters, Virginia and Lucy. Both Kane and Abel had volunteered to serve during World War II. Abel, during World War II, had saved Kane's life in France, unaware of each other. He divorces Zaphia when he returns home from the war.

Meanwhile, Kane's bank and Lester's bank merge and a provision is made that anyone who has a share of 8% can summon board meetings. Abel tries desperately to obtain 8% of the bank's stock but Kane manages to thwart his attempts. They unknowingly meet each other many times throughout the novel.

Florentyna Rosnovski, daughter of Abel Rosnovski, and Richard Kane, son of William Kane, happen to meet and fall in love without knowing about the rivalry between their fathers. They get married despite vehement protests from their fathers and start a chain of boutique stores named Florentyna's.

Finally, after Kane exposes Abel's dealings with Osborne and thwarts his ambition to be named Ambassador to Poland (the position goes to John Moors Cabot), Abel manages to obtain enough shares of the bank and ousts Kane from power. In 1967, Kane decides to forgive his son and daughter-in-law and expresses his wish to meet them. Both he and Abel observe the grand-opening of the New York branch Florentyna's, from outside, and they wave at each other. Kane dies before he is able to see them and his grandson William. Finally, in a dramatic twist, Abel discovers that his backer was not David Maxton, but William Kane. Filled with remorse, he reconciles with his daughter and son-in-law. Abel dies soon after, and bequeaths everything to his daughter Florentyna, except his silver band of authority, which he leaves to his grandson, whom Florentyna and Richard have named "William Abel Kane".

== Adaptations ==
=== Miniseries ===
In 1985, the novel was adapted into a CBS television miniseries titled Kane & Abel starring Peter Strauss as Abel Rosnovski and Sam Neill as William Kane. The main cast includes:

- Peter Strauss as Abel Rosnovski
- Sam Neill as William Lowell Kane
- Ron Silver as Thaddeus Cohen
- David Dukes as David Osborne
- Fred Gwynne as Davis LeRoy
- Tom Roberts Byrd as Richard Kane
- Alberta Watson as Zofia Rosnovski
- Reed Birney as Matthew Lester
- Vyto Ruginis as George Nowak
- Jill Eikenberry as Susan Lester
- Richard Anderson as Alan Lloyd
- Kate McNeil as Florentyna Rosnovski
- Veronica Hamel as Kate Kane

=== Further adaptations ===
The series was adapted into Doordarshan series Junoon which completed 510 episodes and ran for five years between 1994 and 1998. Another Indian adaptation titled Kismat ("Destiny"), produced by YRF Television, was set in Bombay in post-independent India. The Hindi movie Khudgarz was based on this book and released on 31 July 1987.
