= Bhale Pellam =

- Cover
- Directed by: Kranthi Kumar
- Written by: Ganesh Patro (dialogues)
- Story by: P. Vasu
- Based on: Purusha Lakshanam (1993)
- Produced by: V. Doraswamy Raju
- Starring: Jagapathi Babu; Meena
- Cinematography: Chota K. Naidu
- Edited by: A. Sreekar Prasad
- Music by: Deva
- Production company: VMC Productions
- Release date: 30 March 1994
- Running time: 132 minutes
- Country: India
- Language: Telugu

Bhale Pellam (transl. Excellent wife/What a wife) is a 1994 Telugu-language drama film directed by A. Kranthi Kumar. It stars Jagapathi Babu, Meena and music composed by Deva. The film was produced by V. Doraswamy Raju under the VMC Productions banner. The film was a remake of the Tamil film Purusha Lakshanam (1993).

== Cast ==
- Jagapathi Babu as Nanda Gopal
- Meena as Bharathi
- Satyanarayana
- Gollapudi Maruthi Rao
- Kota Srinivasa Rao
- Brahmanandam
- Sudhakar
- AVS
- Dharmavarapu Subramanyam
- Raja Ravindra
- Madan Mohan
- Ananth
- Gundu Hanumantha Rao
- Gautam Raju
- Dham
- Rohini Hattangadi
- Kinnera
- Kavitha Sri
- Radha Prashanthi
- Ayesha Jalil
- Swetha
- Srilata
- Padma
- Bhanusri
- Kalpana Rai

== Soundtrack ==
Bhale Pellam

Film score by Deva
- Released: 1994
- Genre: Soundtrack
- Length: 27:05
- Label: VMG CASSETTES
- Producer: Deva

Music composed by Deva. Lyrics written by Veturi. Music released on VMG CASSETTES Company. "Andala Matthulona", "Lokalu Yele", and "Maapatela Mallelabasthi" were reused from the original.

| No. | Title | Singer(s) | Length |
|---|---|---|---|
| 1. | "Andala Matthulona" | S. P. Balasubrahmanyam, Chitra | 4:36 |
| 2. | "Abbiga Yemannadhi" | S. P. Balasubrahmanyam, Chitra | 4:38 |
| 3. | "Lokalu Yele" | Chitra | 5:24 |
| 4. | "Maapatela Mallelabasthi" | Mano, Malgudi Subha | 4:22 |
| 5. | "Vardillu Vardillu" | S. P. Balasubrahmanyam | 3:55 |
| 6. | "Zindabad Zindabad" | Chitra | 4:10 |
| Total length: | | | 27:05 |
