= Vasavi (disambiguation) =

Vasavi may refer to:

- Sri Vasavi Vaibhavam, 2012 Indian Telugu-language devotional film
- Vasavi Kanyaka Parameshvari, a Hindu goddess, primarily revered by the Komati community of South and Central India
- Vasavi language, a Western Indo-Aryan language spoken by the Bhil people

== People ==
- Aninhalli Vasavi (born 1958), Indian anthropologist

== Places ==
- GMR Vasavi Diesel Power Plant, a power plant in Basin Bridge, Chennai, India (1999–2018)
- Sri Vasavi College, a general degree college in Erode, Tamil Nadu, India
- Vasavi College of Engineering, technical institute in Hyderabad, India
- Vasavi Colony, a commercial and residential neighborhood in Hyderabad, Telangana, India
- Vasavi LB Nagar, metro station in Hyderabad, India
- Vasavi Penugonda, a village in Andhra Pradesh, India
- Vasavilan, a town in Northern Province, Sri Lanka
