= Nandi Awards of 1984 =

Indian Telugu film and TV awards ceremony

Nandi Awards presented annually by Government of Andhra Pradesh. First awarded in 1964.

== 1984 Nandi Awards Winners List ==
Category	Winner	Film
Best Feature Film	Kranthi Kumar	Swati
Second Best Feature Film	V. Madhusudhana Rao	Kanchana Ganga
Third Best Feature Film	Beeram masthan Rao	Suvarna Sundari
