= Annamayya (film) =

- Theatrical release poster
- Directed by: K. Raghavendra Rao
- Written by: Screenplay: K. Raghavendra Rao; Story & Dialogues: J. K. Bharavi
- Produced by: V. Doraswamy Raju
- Starring: Nagarjuna Akkineni; Mohan Babu; Suman; Ramya Krishna; Roja; Bhanupriya; Kasthuri
- Cinematography: A. Vincent; Ajayan Vincent (Special Effects)
- Edited by: A. Sreekar Prasad
- Music by: M. M. Keeravani
- Production company: VMC Productions
- Release date: 22 May 1997
- Running time: 147 minutes
- Country: India
- Language: Telugu

Annamayya is a 1997 Indian Telugu-language hagiographical film directed by K. Raghavendra Rao and produced by V. Doraswamy Raju under the VMC Productions banner. The film portrays the life of the 15th century composer Annamacharya, played by Nagarjuna Akkineni who features alongside an ensemble cast including Mohan Babu, Suman, Ramya Krishna, Bhanupriya, Roja, and Kasthuri. The film has score and soundtrack composed by M. M. Keeravani. The film won eight Nandi Awards, three Filmfare Awards and two National Film Awards. It was featured in the Indian panorama mainstream section at the 29th IFFI.

== Plot ==
External videos
- Annamayya on YouTube.

Vishnu listens to requests from his wife Lakshmi, that there weren't many people singing songs in praise of the Lord. In response, the Lord sends his sword Nandaka, to be born as Annamacharya (Annamayya) to a childless couple - Narayana Suri and Lakkamba in Tallapaka village, Kadapa District. Growing up as a normal young man, Annamayya loves his 2 cousins Timakka & Akkalamma who thinks that they are the most beautiful creations of God.

Lord Vishnu appears in front of Annamayya in disguise and accepts a challenge from him to show someone more beautiful than his cousins - God in the form of Lord Venkateswara in a temple in his village. Upon discovering the beauty of the Lord, Annamayya is lost in a different world and ends up making a pilgrimage to Tirumala Venkateswara Temple without planning or informing his parents. As he finds pilgrims entering the holy hills (Saptagiri- seven hills), he embarks on his journey towards Him. But, he is lost and is helped by Goddess Lakshmi herself in the form of an old lady by informs him that his footwear was preventing his progress. Also weakened by fasting, Annamayya accepts Laddu - a Prasadam from the food consecrated by the Lord himself. Upon reaching Tirumala, he is enthralled by the beauty of God and settles there to write and sing hymns in praise of the Lord.

Meanwhile, Annamayya's parents get worried regarding Annamayya's whereabouts. Then, the Lord Venkateshwara, hearing the prayers of Lakkavaamba (Annamayya's mother), himself comes in the disguise of a Hunter along with his consorts and tells them that Annamayya lives in Tirumala. Then, Annamayya's parents, cousins, aunt, uncle, and his 2 friends come to Tirumala and watch him worship the Lord.

When Annamayya is asked to marry his 2 cousins, he refuses saying that his life is dedicated to the service of the Lord and marriage would become a hindrance to it. But, he is then convinced by the Lord himself who has now taken the form of a Brahmin. The Lord personally conducts the wedding of Annamayya with his cousins - Timakka and Akkalamma. After the birth of the children, Annamayya settles in Tirumala leaving his children in the care of his parents. Through encounters with the local administrator (Tanikella Bharani), he comes in contact with the ruler of the country - Saluva Narasimha (Mohan Babu), who becomes a fan of his songs and makes him the court poet. On hearing a Sringara Sankeertan, the King and Queen (Roja) request that Annamayya sing a Sankeertan in their praise as well, something Annamayya rejects as he would sing only for the Lord and not for any human being. Jailed for not heeding the King, Annamayya invokes the Lord in the form of Narasimha (human-lion), and to the surprise of the King, jailors, and everyone - the iron rods burst into flames and release Annamayya.

Realizing that their husband was born for humanity and Lord's service, his wives give up their lives freeing Annamayya of any earthly attachment. Annamayya, realizing the divine order, takes to writing poems and Sankirtans and reaches old age. Priests and Brahmins unhappy with his social inclusion of lower caste people in the temple try to destroy his writings. When Annamayya decides to sacrifice his life because all his works were lost, a significant portion of his work is saved by Lord's grace from the fire. Saluva Narasimha and Annamayya's sons convert his work from palm to copper inscriptions thus preserving his works for eternity. On completion and dedication of the work in the temple sanctum sanctorum, the Lord and his consorts appear one last time, in their divine form. The Lord grants salvation and Annamayya's soul returns as Nandaka.

== Cast ==
- Nagarjuna as Annamayya
- Suman as Lord Venkateshwara (Voice Dubbed By S. P. Balasubrahmanyam)
- Mohan Babu as Saluva Narasimha Rayalu
- Bhanupriya as Goddess Padmavati
- Ramya Krishna as Timmakka (Voice dubbed by Roja Ramani)
- Kasthuri as Akkalamma (Voice dubbed by Shilpa)
- Roja as Saluva Narasimha Rayalu's wife (Voice dubbed by Roja Ramani)
- Sri Kanya as Goddess Bhoodevi (Voice dubbed by Shilpa)
- M. Balayya as Narayana Suri
- Subha as Lakkamamba
- Kota Srinivasa Rao
- Brahmanandam as Annamayya's friend
- Babu Mohan
- Tanikella Bharani
- Mallikarjuna Rao
- AVS as Narada
- Gundu Hanumantha Rao as Annamayya's friend
- Chitti Babu
- Ananth Babu
- Suthi Velu
- Jenny
- "Fight Master" Raju
- Siva Parvathi

== Reception ==
Upon its release, the film became a cult classic and remains one of the most celebrated Telugu movies ever made. Although certain aspects of Shri Tallapaka Annamacharya's life story were modified, these creative liberties ultimately contributed to the film’s widespread appeal and commercial success.

== Soundtrack ==
Annamayya

Soundtrack album by M. M. Keeravani
- Released: January 1997
- Genre: Feature film soundtrack
- Length: 65:51
- Label: T-Series
- Producer: M. M. Keeravani

M. M. Keeravani chronology
Devaraagam (1996)	Annamayya (1997)	Surya Putrulu (1997)

The soundtrack of the film was released in January 1997 under T-Series record label. The audio was initially released in two volumes (Vol. 1 & Vol. 2) in the Audio cassette format. The film album is the highest sold Telugu music album till date. Most of the tracks which demanded main lead voices were recorded by S. P. Balasubrahmaniyum & Chitra, who were then household singers of Telugu film industry & also were acclaimed for making this album immortal with their golden voices. The rest other singers like M. M. Keeravani, Mano, Sujatha, Srilekha, Purna Chander, Anuradha Sriram & Renuka recorded almost all the backing vocals in the entire album. Many krithis of Annamaachaarya were brought back to life again through this album, say Nigama Nigamantha Krithi sung by SPB & Chitra still holds a special place in every Telugu film lover's hearts.

All music is composed by M. M. Keeravani.

Telugu Track listing
No.	Title	Lyrics	Artist(s)	Length
1.	"Vinaro Bhagyamu"	Annamayya Keerthana	S. P. Balasubrahmanyam, M. M. Srilekha, M. M. Keeravani, Sujatha Mohan, Anuradha Sriram, Anand, Gangadhar, Renuka, Purnachandar, Anand Bhattacharya	3:32
2.	"Telugu Padaniki"	Veturi	S. P. Balasubrahmanyam, Sujatha Mohan, Renuka	3:56
3.	"Ele Ele Maradala"	Veturi	S. P. Balasubrahmanyam, Sujatha Mohan, Anuradha Sriram	4:26
4.	"Padhaharu Kalalaku"	J. K. Bharavi	Mano	2:16
5.	"Kalaganti Kalaganti"	Annamayya Keerthana	S. P. Balasubrahmanyam	2:53
6.	"Adhivo Alladivo"	Annamayya Keerthana	S. P. Balasubrahmanyam	3:57
7.	"Podagantimayya"	Annamayya Keerthana	S. P. Balasubrahmanyam	4:10
8.	"Vinnapalu Vinavale"	Annamayya Keerthana	S. P. Balasubrahmanyam, K. S. Chithra, Renuka, Srilekha	4:08
9.	"Sobhaname Sobhaname"	Annamayya Keerthana	Mano	1:32
10.	"Moosina Muthyalake"	Annamayya Keerthana	S. P. Balasubrahmanyam, K. S. Chithra, Sujatha Mohan	3:22
11.	"Asmadeeya"	Veturi	K. S. Chithra, Mano	3:57
12.	"Kondalalo Nelakonna"	Annamayya Keerthana	S. P. Balasubrahmanyam	1:31
13.	"Emoko"	Annamayya Keerthana	S. P. Balasubrahmanyam	4:22
14.	"Palanethrala"	Annamayya Keerthana	S. P. Balasubrahmanyam	1:26
15.	"Nigama Nigamantha"	Annamayya Keerthana	S. P. Balasubrahmanyam, K. S. Chithra	3:59
16.	"Govindaa Sritha"	Annamayya Keerthana	S. P. Balasubrahmanyam, M. M. Keeravani, Anand Bhattacharya, Anuradha Sriram	8:02
17.	"Nanati Bathuku"	Annamayya Keerthana	Mano	1:06
18.	"Dachuko Nee Padaalaku"	Annamayya Keerthana	S. P. Balasubrahmanyam, S. P. Sailaja	0:46
19.	"Antharyami"	Annamayya Keerthana	S. P. Balasubrahmanyam, S. P. Sailaja	4:15
20.	"Brahma Kadigina Padamu"	Annamayya Keerthana	K. S. Chithra, M. M. Keeravani, Poorna Chandar, Anuradha Sriram, Sujatha Mohan, Radhika	2:05
Total length:				65:51

== Box-office ==
The film turned out to be a Blockbuster with a 100-day run in 42 centres. The film had a 176-day run in 2 centres. The film was a big hit in Chennai & Bangalore too.

The film was dubbed into Tamil as Annamacharya, into Malayalam as Annamacharya and in Hindi as Tirupathi Sri Balaji.

== Awards ==
45th National Film Awards

- Best Music Direction - M. M. Keeravani
- Special Mention (actor) - Nagarjuna

Filmfare Awards South

- Best Film – Telugu - V. Doraswamy Raju Raju
- Best Director – Telugu - K. Raghavendra Rao
- Best Actor – Telugu - Nagarjuna

Nandi Awards - 1997

- Best Feature Film - Gold - V. Doraswamy Raju
- Best Director - K. Raghavendra Rao
- Best Actor - Nagarjuna
- Best Male Dubbing Artist - S. P. Balasubrahmanyam
- Best Costume Designer - Thota Babu Rao
- Best Makeup Artist - T. Mallikarjuna Rao
- Best Art Director - V. Bhaskara Raju
- Best Cinematographer - A. Vincent
