= VMC Productions =

Indian film production and distribution company

Vijaya Maruti Creatives Private Limited
- Company type: Private company
- Industry: Tollywood
- Founded: 1978
- Founder: V. Doraswamy Raju
- Headquarters: Hyderabad, Telangana, India
- Area served: India
- Key people: V. Doraswami Raju (Chairman); V. Vijay Kumar Varma (CEO & MD)
- Services: Cinema Production; Serial Production; Cinema distribution in ceded region
- Parent: VMC Productions
- Subsidiaries: VMC Distributors
- Website: http://vmc1.co/

Vijaya Maruti Creatives Private Limited (VMC Productions or VMC Combines) is a company established by V. Doraswamy Raju which has produced and distributed several Telugu films. Its head office is situated in Hyderabad, Telangana. Its films Seetharamayya gari Manavaralu and Annamayya won the Filmfare Award for Best Film - Telugu.

== Filmography ==
=== Production ===
Year	Title	Cast	Director	Notes	ref
1987	Kirayi Dada	Nagarjuna, Amala Akkineni, Khushbu, Krishnam Raju, Jaya Sudha	A. Kodandarami Reddy		
1991	Seetharamayya Gari Manavaralu	Akkineni Nageswara Rao, Meena, Rohini Hattangadi	Kranthi Kumar		
1992	President Gari Pellam	Akkineni Nagarjuna, Meena	A. Kodandarami Reddy		
1992	Madhavayya gari Manavadu	Akkineni Nageswara Rao, Sujatha, Harish	Muthyala Subbaiah		
1997	Annamayya	Akkineni Nagarjuna, Mohan Babu, Suman, Ramya Krishna, Roja, Bhanupriya, Kasturi	K. Raghavendra Rao		
1999	English Pellam East Godavari Mogudu	Srikanth, Ramya Krishna	R. Suresh Varma		
2003	Simhadri	Jr. NTR, Bhumika Chawla, Ankitha, Mukesh Rishi	S.S. Rajamouli		
2004	Konchem Touchlo Vunte Cheputanu	Sivaji, Archana Shastry	Vamsy		
2009	Vengamamba	Meena, Sai Kiran	Uday Bhaskar		
2012	Sri Vasavi Vaibhavam	Meena, Sai Kiran, Suman, Suhasini, Naga Babu	Uday Bhaskar		
2016	Vijeta	Taraka Ratna, Shweta Basu Prasad	Uday Bhaskar		

=== Distribution ===
VMC has distributed more than 400 films in ceded region.

Year	Title	Cast	Director	Notes	ref
1981	Guru Sishyulu	Akkineni Nageswara Rao, Krishna, Sridevi, Sujatha	K. Bapayya		
1981	Premabhishekam	Akkineni Nageswara Rao, Sridevi, Jayasudha	Dasari Narayana Rao		
1984	Anubandham	Akkineni Nageswara Rao, Radhika, Sujatha	A. Kodandarami Reddy		
1986	Captain Nagarjun	Nagarjuna, Khushbu, Rajendra Prasad	V. B. Rajendra Prasad		
1986	Aranyakanda	Akkineni Nagarjuna, Ashwini, Rajendra Prasad	Kranthi Kumar		
1988	Janaki Ramudu	Akkineni Nagarjuna, Vijayashanti, Jeevitha Rajashekar	K. Raghavendra Rao		
1989	Simha Swapnam	Krishnam Raju, Jayasudha, Jagapathi Babu, Vani Viswanath, Shantipriya	V. Madhusudhana Rao		
1989	Iddaru Iddare	Akkineni Nageswara Rao, Akkineni Nagarjuna, Ramya Krishna	A. Kodandarami Reddy		
1992	Chanti	Venkatesh, Meena	Ravi Raja Pinisetty		
1993	Chinna Alludu	Dasari Narayana Rao, Suman, Aamani	Sarath		
1997	Chilakkottudu	Jagapathi Babu, Rajendra Prasad, Ramya Krishna, Madhu Bala, Gautami, Kasthuri, Indraja	E. V. V. Satyanarayana		
1998	Auto Driver	Akkineni Nagarjuna, Deepti Bhatnagar, Simran	Suresh Krishna		
2004	Andhrawala	Jr. NTR, Rakshitha, Sayaji Shinde, Rahul Dev	Puri Jagannadh		
