= Sardar Paparayudu =

- Theatrical release poster
- Directed by: Dasari Narayana Rao
- Written by: Dasari Narayana Rao
- Produced by: Kranthi Kumar
- Starring: N. T. Rama Rao; Sridevi; Sharada
- Cinematography: S. Venkataratnam
- Edited by: G. G. Krishna Rao
- Music by: Chakravarthy
- Production company: Sri Annapoorna International
- Distributed by: Shayikrishna
- Release date: 30 October 1980
- Running time: 151 minutes
- Country: India
- Language: Telugu

Sardar Paparayudu is a 1980 Indian Telugu-language historical fiction film written and directed by Dasari Narayana Rao. Produced by Kranthi Kumar, it stars N. T. Rama Rao in the title role, alongside Sridevi and Sarada, with music composed by Chakravarthy. The film was a commercial success and was remade in Hindi as Sarfarosh (1985).

== Plot ==
Ramu, a sincere police officer, is in love with Vijaya, the daughter of a corrupt politician, Dharmaraju. Although Dharmaraju maintains a respectable image in public, he is secretly involved in unethical activities. Along with his associates, Satya Murthy and Nyayapathi, Dharmaraju exploited the poor by collaborating with the British. Years earlier, the trio framed a freedom fighter, Sardar Paparayudu, for the murder of a king, Vijayaraghavaraju, in the Andaman Islands. As a result, Paparayudu was sentenced to life imprisonment.

Upon meeting Ramu, Dharmaraju is shaken by the young officer's striking resemblance to Sardar Paparayudu. It is soon revealed that Ramu is, in fact, Paparayudu's son. His mother, Seeta, is married to Paparayudu. Dharmaraju's fears intensify when Sardar Paparayudu is released from prison, seeking vengeance for his wrongful imprisonment.

A conflict arises between Paparayudu and Ramu, as the former seeks justice against Dharmaraju. In a climactic confrontation, Paparayudu sacrifices himself to protect his son and others. In his dying moments, he embraces Ramu, reconciling with him before dying.

== Cast ==
- N. T. Rama Rao as Sardar Paparayudu and Ram "Ramu" Mohan
- Sridevi as Vijaya
- Sharada as Seeta
- Rao Gopal Rao as Dharma Rao
- Satyanarayana as Satya Murthy
- Allu Ramalingaiah as Nyayapathi
- Mohan Babu as Britisher
- Gummadi as Baba
- Prabhakar Reddy as Vijaya Raghava Raju
- Tyagaraju as British Inspector
- K. V. Chalam as Raju
- P. J. Sarma as I.G.
- Chalapathi Rao as Sardar Paparayudu's henchmen
- Pandari Bai as Sardar Paparayudu's mother
- S. Varalakshmi as Urmila Devi
- Athili Lakshmi as Vijaya's mother
- Jyothi Lakshmi in an item number

== Production ==
=== Development ===
The idea for Sardar Paparayudu came about when producer Kranthi Kumar, who had previously worked on smaller, women-centric films such as Sarada (1973), Jyothi (1976), Kalpana (1977), and Ame Katha (1977) decided to make a film with the reigning superstar N. T. Rama Rao. Dasari Narayana Rao was selected to direct, with Kranthi Kumar, and Palagummi Padmaraju participating in honing the script along with Dasari Narayana Rao.

Originally titled Paparayudu, the film's name was later changed to Sardar Paparayudu for added emphasis. Sardar Paparayudu was the third collaboration between Rama Rao and director Dasari Narayana Rao, following successful films like Manushulantha Okkate (1976) and Circus Ramudu (1980).

=== Casting ===
Rama Rao was cast in the dual roles of the father, Paparayudu, and his son, Ram Mohan. His portrayal of these two distinct characters, with unique mannerisms and dialogue, was a highlight of the film. Sridevi played the female lead, and Rao Gopal Rao took on the role of the antagonist, Dharmaraju. Other notable cast members included Gummadi as Baba and Mohan Babu as a British soldier.

=== Filming ===
The film's production was notable for its extensive period settings, especially during sequences portraying pre-independence India. Rama Rao took special care in distinguishing the two characters he portrayed, ensuring their personalities and dialogue were unique. Additionally, Rama Rao fulfilled a long-held desire to portray Alluri Sitarama Raju in a dream sequence in the song "Vinara Bharatha Veera Kumara," a Burrakatha composed by Sri Sri. There was a notable incident during the filming when Rama Rao sustained a wrist injury, which led to a belief that the film would be a box-office success, following a pattern in his earlier films.

== Music ==
Sardar Paparayudu

Soundtrack album by Chakravarthy
- Released: 1980
- Genre: Feature film soundtrack
- Length: 30:14
- Label: AVM Audio
- Producer: Chakravarthy

Chakravarthy chronology
Rowdy Ramudu Konte Krishnudu (1980)	Sardar Paparayudu (1980)	Sarada Ramudu (1981)

The music was composed by Chakravarthy. Sri Sri, Rajasri, and Dasari Narayana Rao penned the lyrics. The Burrakatha "Vinara Bharatha Veera Kumara," written by Sri Sri and performed by Burrakatha Benarjee, became an iconic piece in the film. The song was later included in many historical retrospectives on Telugu cinema. After the movie's initial release, the song "Jyothilakshmi Cheerakattindi" was added to extend the film's appeal.

No.	Title	Lyrics	Singer(s)	Length
1.	"Hello Temper"	Rajasri	S. P. Balasubrahmanyam	3:48
2.	"Thella Cheera Kallakatuka"	Dasari Narayana Rao	S. P. Balasubrahmanyam, P. Susheela	4:38
3.	"Pandommidhi Vandhala"	Rajasri	S. P. Balasubrahmanyam, P. Susheela	4:41
4.	"Jyothilakshmi"	Dasari Narayana Rao	S. Janaki	5:59
5.	"Uyyalaku Vayasochchindhi"	Rajasri	S. P. Balasubrahmanyam, P. Susheela	4:19
6.	"Burrakatha"	Sri Sri	S. P. Balasubrahmanyam, Benerjee	6:49
Total length:				30:14

== Reception ==
Venkatram of Andhra Patrika appreciated the direction, screenplay and dialogues by Dasari Narayana Rao, songs by Chakravarthy and the performances of the cast.

Sardar Paparayudu was a commercial success. The film's powerful dialogues, penned by Dasari Narayana Rao, resonated with audiences, leading to high sales of LP records and cassettes of the audio track of the film. The film's re-recording, especially in the pre-independence era sequences, was highly praised. Rama Rao's dual-role performance was celebrated, with particular attention paid to the distinct mannerisms of both characters.
