= Oru Puthiya Kathai =

- Title card
- Directed by: R. Balasubbiah
- Produced by: M. Rajaram
- Starring: Prabhuraj; Meena
- Cinematography: G K. Raja
- Music by: Uma Kannadasan
- Production company: Kumar Movies
- Release date: 10 August 1990
- Country: India
- Language: Tamil

Oru Puthiya Kathai (transl. A new story) is a 1990 Indian Tamil-language romantic drama film directed by R. Balasubbiah, starring newcomer Prabhuraj and Meena. It was released on 10 August 1990.

== Cast ==
- Prabhuraj as Ravi
- Meena
- Bhavani
- Prasad
- Senthil
- R. Sundarrajan
- Peeli Sivam

== Production ==
Meena, who starred as a child actress in several films, made her lead Tamil debut with this film. She gained recognition on the serial Anbulla Amma before acting in this film. Editor M. Rajaram of Dinamalar turned producer with this film.

== Soundtrack ==
Uma Kannadasan, who is not related to Kannadasan, composed the soundtrack and wrote the lyrics.

== Reception ==
N. Krishnaswamy of The Indian Express opined that "the director Balasubbiah, though he flounders off and on, has kept the fare clean". B. S. S. of Kalki criticised the film for not presenting a new story while noting that Uma Kannadasan's music sounds like Ilaiyaraaja's in places. The film was a commercial failure.
