= Sri Vasavi Vaibhavam =

Indian devotional film

- DVD cover
- Directed by: Uday Bhaskar
- Screenplay by: T. K. Bhara
- Story by: Uday Bhaskar
- Produced by: V. Doraswamy Raju
- Starring: Meena; Suman; Sai Kiran; Suhasini
- Cinematography: Uday Bhaskar
- Music by: Arjun Sharma
- Production company: VMC Combines
- Release date: 16 November 2012
- Country: India
- Language: Telugu

Sri Vasavi Vaibhavam is a 2012 Indian Telugu-language devotional film directed by Uday Bhaskar and starring Meena, Suman, Sai Kiran and Suhasini, who plays the titular role.

== Plot ==
The film is about how Parvati Devi becomes Vasavi Kanyaka Parameshvari as a result of a curse.

== Cast ==
- Meena as Parvati
- Suman
- Sai Kiran as Vishnuvardhana
- Suhasini as Vasavi Kanyaka Parameshvari
- Priya Haasan
- Sridhar as Shiva
- Raghunatha Reddy
- Ashok Kumar
- Ananth
- Kavitha
- Sana

== Production ==
Despite being married and the mother of a then one-year-old daughter named Nainika, Meena accepted the film offer from producer V. Doraswamy Raju as she didn't want to send a wrong signal that she is not acting anymore. She shot for the film for four days at her convenience in Bangalore, where she lived at the time. The first schedule of the film was shot from 19 February 2012 to 19 February. 100 prominent Arya Vysya couples were invited to the sets during the shooting of the scenes with Vasavi Kanyaka Parameshvari entering the fire.

== Soundtrack ==
Sri Vasavi Vaibhavam

Soundtrack album by Arjun Sharma
- Released: 2012
- Genre: Feature film soundtrack
- Length: 30:20
- Language: Telugu
- Label: Aditya Music
External audio
- Sri Vasavi Vaibhavam – Jukebox on YouTube

The music was composed by Arjun Sharma. The lyrics were written by Uday Bhaskar. The platimum disc function took place on 12 September 2012 with Konijeti Rosaiah, Sagar, Prasanna Kumar, Tammareddy Bharadwaja, Taraka Ratna, Swetha Basu Prasad, and Rachana Maurya as the chief guests.

Track listing
No.	Title	Singer(s)	Length
1.	"Champaya Gourartha"	—	0:32
2.	"Kasthurika Slokam"	—	0:32
3.	"Hreemkarasana"	Janaki Ram	0:47
4.	"Kothi Bavalu"	Janaki Ram, Shilpa Sagar	2:55
5.	"Mangalam"	Malavika	4:03
6.	"Ammalagannayamma"	Malavika, Anuradha Bhat	4:19
7.	"Om Namashivaya"	Pallavi Suri	4:14
8.	"Sadashiva Nee Roopam"	Pallavi Suri	3:58
9.	"Sri Vasavi Slokam"	S. P. Balasubrahmanyam	0:47
10.	"Sri Vasavi Dandakam"	S. P. Balasubrahmanyam	3:52
11.	"Vande Vanchitha Slokam"	Shilpa Sagar	0:22
12.	"Sri Krishnostava"	Shilpa Sagar	0:53
13.	"Akaram Ukaram"	Uma Neha	3:06
Total length:			30:20

== Reception ==
A critic from The Times of India rated the film 2.5/5 and wrote, "The film seeks to offer a flattering portrayal of goddess Vasavi Devi for the devotees but there is something that doesn’t click. The film fails to conjure up a single intense devotional moment and that proves to be its undoing. Everything is just too passé".
