= Ganesh Patro =

Indian film writer (1945–2015)

- Born: Behara Ganesh Patro; 22 June 1945; Parvathipuram, Madras Presidency, British India
- Died: 5 January 2015 (aged 69); Chennai, Tamil Nadu, India
- Occupations: Playwright; screenwriter; lyricist
- Writing career
- Years active: 1975–2001; 2013

Behara Ganesh Patro (22 June 1945 – 5 January 2015) was an Indian playwright and screenwriter known for his works in Telugu cinema. He started his career in 1965, and wrote dialogues, songs, and stories for Telugu films from the 1970s up to the 1990s, including, Rudraveena, Maro Charitra, Idi Katha Kaadu, Mayuri, and Seetharamayya Gari Manavaralu.

He worked in over 100 films and is known for his association with K. Balachander and Kodi Ramakrishna.

== Life and career ==
Ganesh Patro was born on 22 June 1945 in Parvathipuram of Vizianagaram district, Andhra Pradesh.

He wrote dialogue for several films including Maro Charitra, Rudraveena, Maa Pallelo Gopaludu, Nirnayam, and Mayuri (film) among others. After a 15-year sabbatical, he wrote dialogue for Seethamma Vakitlo Sirimalle Chettu in 2013. Patro also wrote many plays in Telugu theatre and literature.

Patro died at age 69 on 5 January 2015 in Chennai while undergoing a treatment for cancer.

== Filmography ==
=== As dialogue writer ===
- Naaku Swaatantram Vacchindhi (1975)
- Alludochadu (1976)
- Atha Varrillu (1976
- Chilakamma cheppindhi (1977)
- Tholireyi Gadichindi (1977)
- Maro Charitra (1978)
- Naalage endharo (1978)
- Andamaina Anubhavam (1979)
- Guppedu Manasu (1979)
- Idi Katha Kaadu (1979)
- Tholi Kodi Koosindi (1980)
- 47 Rojulu (1981)
- Meesam kosam [(1981)]
- Aadavaallu Meeku Joharlu (1981)
- Aakali Rajyam (1981)
- Daaham daaham (1981)
- Adavalle Aligithe (1983)
- Kokilamma (1983)
- Mukku Pudaka (1983)
- Disco King (1984)
- Mangamma Gari Manavadu (1984)
- Manishiko charitra (1984)
- Mayuri (1984)
- Swaathi (1984)
- Maa Pallelo Gopaludu (1985)
- Mugguru Mithrulu (1985)
- O thandri theerpu (1985)
- Premichu Pelladu (1985)
- Mannemlo monagadu (1986)
- Mr. Bharath (1986)
- Muddula Krishnaiah (1986)
- Sraavana Meghaalu (1986)
- Shravana Sandhya (1986)
- Sravanthi (1986)
- Aranyakanda (1987)
- Collector Gari Abbai (1987)
- Gowthami (1987)
- Muvva Gopaludu (1987)
- Samsaram Oka Chadarangam (1987)
- Talambralu (1987)
- Dharmapathni (1987)
- Chakravarthy (1987)
- Aahuthi (1988)
- Murali Krishnudu (1988)
- Rudraveena (1988)
- Station Master (1988)
- Muddula Mavayya (1989)
- Vicky Daada (1989)
- Guru Sishyulu (1990)
- Muddula Menalludu (1990)
- Iddaru Iddare (1990)
- Puttinti pattu cheera (1990)
- Amma (1991)
- Amma Rajeenama (1991)
- Ashwini (1991)
- Jeevana Chadarangam (1991)
- Madhura Nagarilo (1991)
- Nirnayam (1991)
- Seetharamayya Gari Manavaralu (1991)
- Akka Mogudu (1992)
- Allari Pilla (1992)
- Dabbu Bhale Jabbu (1992)
- Madhavayya Gari Manavadu (1992)
- Pellam chepthe vinaali (1992)
- Mahanadhi (1993)
- Rajeswari Kalyanam (1993)
- Tholi Muddhu (1993)
- Sarigamalu (1994)
- Theerpu (1994)
- Maa Voori Maaraju (1994)
- Maatho Pettukoku (1995)
- Ratha Yaatra (1997)
- Padutha Theeyaga (1998)
- Maa Balaji (1999)
- 9 Nelalu (2001)
- Seethamma Vakitlo Sirimalle Chettu (2013)

== Awards ==
- Nandi Award for Best Dialogue Writer - 2 times
  - 1984 - Swathi
  - 1988 - Rudraveena
- Nandi Award for Second Best Story Writer - Naalaaga Endaro
