= 9 Nelalu =

2000 film by Kranthi Kumar

- Directed by: Kranthi Kumar
- Written by: Kranthi Kumar; Ganesh Patro (dialogues)
- Produced by: Kranthi Kumar
- Starring: Soundarya; Vikram
- Cinematography: C. Ramprasad
- Music by: V. S. Udhaya
- Production company: Sri Sai Creations
- Release date: 11 August 2000
- Running time: 135 minutes
- Country: India
- Language: Telugu

9 Nelalu or Tommidi Nelalu (transl. 9 Months) is a 2000 Telugu-language drama film co-written, produced, and directed by Kranthi Kumar. It starred Soundarya and Vikram. It opened to positive reviews from critics and was later re-shot and released in Tamil as Kanden Seethaiyai (transl. I saw Seetha), due to Vikram's newfound popularity post-Sethu. The film was premiered retrospective at the Toronto International Film Festival; Kumar shot the film in a record 15 days. Noted directors V. V. Vinayak and Surender Reddy worked as assistant directors on the film. The film was a box office flop although Soundarya's performance was praised.

== Plot ==
The film revolves around Savitri (Soundarya), an innocent simple and loving orphan, and Surendra (Vikram), an intelligent computer programmer. When Savitri has a marriage arranged with a drunkard (M. S. Narayana), Surendra stops this alliance and graciously agreed to marry her.

However, trouble starts when Surendra's brainchild, a virtual reality program on temples of South India is sabotaged, and he is accused of selling out to a rival company. Disillusioned by the sudden turn of events, he crashes into a truck and sustains a serious head injury that requires a major operation.

Savitri finds herself deserted by all her well-wishers when it comes to financial help, and her husband's life hangs in the balance. A lady doctor suggests that she become pregnant through artificial insemination for a rich man, whose wife is impotent, in exchange for monetary remuneration. Savitri agrees and the rest of the film is based on the social stigma attached to artificial insemination and surrogate motherhood.

== Cast ==
As per the film's opening credits:

- Soundarya as Savitri
- Vikram as Surendra
- Nutan Prasad as Judge
- Tanikella Bharani as Lawyer
- Narra Venkateswara Rao as Surendra's father
- M. S. Narayana as Peon
- Raghunatha Reddy as Doctor
- Dharmavarapu Subramanyam as Surendra's uncle
- Sudarshan as Savitri's family friend
- Uttej as Ice cream seller
- Sudha as Surendra's mother
- Madhavi Latha as Nurse
- Lakshmipati as News reporter for Popular TV (uncredited)

Tamil version

- Vivek as Indrajith
- Mayilsamy as Guduvancheri Govindasamy
- Bayilvan Ranganathan as Aruval Arumugam
- Kullamani as Indrajith's friend

== Production ==
Soundarya dubbed her own voice for her character in the film.

== Soundtrack ==
A. R. Rahman was initially signed on to score the film's music, but he later opted out owing to budget constraints. Later V. S. Udhaya came in as themusic director.

Tamil version

All lyrics are written by Snehan.

Track listing
No.	Title	Singer(s)	Length
1.	"Athi Kalai"	Srinivas	5:02
2.	"Vingnanathai Nambi"	Vivek	5:01
3.	"Yar Vanthu"	Harish Raghavendra	5:56
4.	"Yar Vanthu"	Harini	5:56
5.	"Americavil"	P. Unnikrishnan	4:16
6.	"Alwana Alwada"	Harini	5:01
7.	"Surian"	Pushpavanam Kuppusamy	5:12
Total length:			35:24

== Reception ==
Christopher Domingo of Fullhyd.com noted that "in short, this is cinema at its best" and that "the script is smooth flowing and engrossing" and that "it leaves you with a thought and a sense of pride in Indian cinema. Whether it will go down well with the masses is doubtful as there are no songs, action or cheap comedy, which might be a bitter pill to swallow for most". In regard to performances, the critic notes that Soundarya "excels in her role and that her expressions, body language and dialogue delivery fit her role like a glove" and that "Vikram has given a controlled performance as the troubled, confused, yet loving husband". C Vanaja of Indiainfo wrote, "The director has succeeded in dealing with the issue in a convincing manner though he resorts to melodrama in some scenes. Soundarya is extraordinary in her role, with Vikram lending able support". The film was later re-shot and released in Tamil as Kanden Seethaiyai with a comedy track separately shot with Vivek and Mayilsamy added in.
