= Kirayi Dada =

- Theatrical release poster
- Directed by: A. Kodandarami Reddy
- Screenplay by: A. Kodandarami Reddy; Satyanand (dialogues)
- Produced by: V. Doraswamy Raju
- Starring: Nagarjuna; Amala Akkineni; Khusboo; Krishnam Raju; Jaya Sudha
- Cinematography: N. Sudhakar Reddy
- Edited by: D. Venkataratnam
- Music by: Chakravarthy
- Production company: V.M.C Productions
- Release date: 12 November 1987
- Running time: 175 minutes
- Country: India
- Language: Telugu

Kirayi Dada (transl. Hench Man) is a 1987 Indian Telugu-language action drama film produced by V. Doraswamy Raju under VMC Productions and directed by A. Kodandarami Reddy. It stars Nagarjuna, Amala, Khusboo, Krishnam Raju, Jayasudha and music composed by Chakravarthy. This film is a remake of the Hindi movie Jaal (1986). This was Amala's Telugu debut and after this film, she played some other leading roles with her future husband, Nagarjuna, and the duo was considered among the finest duos of Tollywood.

== Plot ==
Vijay is an unemployed guy suffering from family problems. Rani Malini, alias Arunabai, a Kothi dancer, appoints him as a spy against Naga Raja Varma, a Zamindar of an estate. Vijay goes to his estate and gets a job. Naga Raja Varma's daughter, Rekha and his henchman Koti's daughter, Latha both fall in love with Vijay, but Vijay loves Latha. One day, Vijay discovers that Naga Raja Varma's younger brother Krishna Raja Varma is Malini's husband who was killed by Naga Raja Varma; and Vijay's father Satyam is trapped in the case and Latha is Malini's daughter. The rest of the story is about how Vijay defeats Naga Raja Varma in the climax.

== Cast ==
- Nagarjuna as Vijay
- Amala Akkineni as Latha
- Khusboo as Rekha
- Krishnam Raju as Zamindar Chinababu Krishna Raja Varma
- Jaya Sudha as Rani Malini / Arunabai
- Rao Gopal Rao as Nagaraja Varma
- Gollapudi Maruti Rao as Damodaram
- Murali Mohan as Satyam
- Sudhakar as Jackie
- Sreedhar Surapaneni as Koti
- Rallapalli as Sivayya
- Mada Venkateswara Rao as Chitti
- Suthi Veerabhadra Rao as Gadala Gavaraju
- KK Sarma as Ratio shop owner
- Annapoorna as Parvatamma
- Varalakshmi as Lakshmi
- Anita as Janaki
- Maheeja as Chilaka

== Soundtrack ==
Kirayi Dada

Film score by Chakravarthy
- Released: 1987
- Genre: Soundtrack
- Length: 24:49
- Label: Saptaswar Audio
- Producer: Chakravarthy

Chakravarthy chronology
Agni Putrudu (1987)	Kirayi Dada (1987)	Jebu Donga (1987)

Music was composed by Chakravarthy. Lyrics were written by Veturi. Music released on SAPTASWAR Audio Company.

S. No.	Song title	Singers	length
1	"Nee Buggapandu"	S. P. Balasubrahmanyam, S. Janaki	4:29
2	"Kurise Megalu"	S. P. Balasubrahmanyam, S. Janaki	4:22
3	"Nalanti Majnulu"	S. P. Balasubrahmanyam	3:50
4	"1 2 3 Vateseyi"	S. P. Balasubrahmanyam, S. Janaki	4:15
5	"Gumthalakadi"	S. P. Balasubrahmanyam	4:03
6	"Rathrivelaku"	S. P. Balasubrahmanyam, P. Susheela	3:50
