= Sarfarosh (1985 film) =

- Theatrical release poster
- Directed by: Dasari Narayana Rao
- Written by: Kader Khan (dialogues); Dasari Narayana Rao (story / screenplay)
- Based on: Sardar Papa Rayudu (1980) by Dasari Narayana Rao
- Produced by: Prasan Kapoor; Jeetendra (Presents)
- Starring: Jeetendra; Leena Chandavarkar; Sridevi
- Cinematography: M. Kannappa
- Edited by: K. Gopal Rao
- Music by: Laxmikant–Pyarelal
- Production company: Tirupati Pictures Enterprises
- Release date: 15 March 1985
- Running time: 159 minutes
- Country: India
- Language: Hindi

Sarfarosh (transl. Fervour) is a 1985 Indian Hindi-language action drama film, produced by Prasan Kapoor and directed by Dasari Narayana Rao. It stars Jeetendra, Leena Chandavarkar and Sridevi and music composed by Laxmikant–Pyarelal. The film is a remake of Telugu-language film Sardar Papa Rayudu (1980).

== Cast ==
- Jeetendra as Jwala Singh / Suraj Kapoor (Double Role)
- Leena Chandavarkar as Seeta
- Sridevi as Vijaya
- Prem Chopra as Nyay Sharma
- Ranjeet as Satyadev
- Kader Khan as Dharmadhikari
- Asrani as Buddhiram
- Nirupa Roy as Jwala's Mother
- Pran as Baba
- Bharat Bhushan as Raja Raghunathraj
- Bindu as Item Dancer
- Satyendra Kapoor as Singer in song 'Yaad Rakhna'
- Shriram Lagoo
- Raj Mehra
- Prem Kumar (unnamed role)

== Soundtrack ==
Song	Singer
"Sridevi Sridevi Sridevi Tu Nahin"	Kishore Kumar
"Chor Chor Chor, Chori Ho Gayi"	Kishore Kumar, Asha Bhosle
"Raat Meri Saiyan Se Anban"	Asha Bhosle
"Sare Shahar Ke Sharabi, O Bhabhi, Mere Peechhe Pade Hai"	Anuradha Paudwal, Alka Yagnik
"Yaad Rakhna, Bhool Na Jana Veer Amar Shahidon Ki Yeh Qurbani"	Suresh Wadkar, Mahendra Kapoor
