= Nirnayam (1991 film) =

- Theatrical release poster
- Directed by: Priyadarshan
- Written by: Ganesh Patro (dialogues)
- Screenplay by: Priyadarshan
- Story by: Priyadarshan
- Based on: Vandanam (1989) by Priyadarshan
- Produced by: D. Kishore; Murali Mohan (Presents)
- Starring: Nagarjuna; Amala
- Cinematography: S. Kumar
- Edited by: N. Gopalakrishnan
- Music by: Ilaiyaraaja
- Production company: Jayabheri Art Productions
- Release date: 21 February 1991
- Running time: 164 minutes
- Country: India
- Language: Telugu

Nirnayam (transl. Decision) is a 1991 Indian Telugu-language action drama film directed by Priyadarshan in his Telugu debut, produced by D. Kishore on Jayabheri Art Productions banner, presented by M.Murali Mohan, starring Nagarjuna and Amala with music composed by Ilaiyaraaja.

The movie was dubbed in Tamil and Hindi languages as Sambavam and Girafthari respectively. This film is a remake of Priyadarshan's own 1989 Malayalam film Vandanam starring Mohanlal which itself is loosely based on the 1987 movie Stakeout.

== Plot ==
A sincere cop named Vamsi Krishna (Nagarjuna) is sent undercover along with two other cops. Shivram (Subhalekha Sudhakar) is one of those cops and is a close friend and associate to Vamsi. The cops are sent by the Police Commissioner Narahari (Giri Babu) to track down a vicious criminal named Raghuram (Murali Mohan). Vamsi surveils Raghuram's daughter Geetha (Amala) by renting an apartment in the building opposite her flat to gather details on her criminal father. Geeta lives with her aunt Jolly (Sukumari). When Vamsi, in the guise of a telephone department inspector, pursues Geetha and falls in love with her, she reciprocates his love initially but refuses his advances after she learns the truth of his profession and that he is about to drag her father to prison. Vamsi gets a hold of Raghuram through Geetha and finds out that he is actually an innocent victim. The real criminal, Prahlad (Sharat Saxena), made Raghuram his scapegoat and plans a crime operation. The misunderstanding between Geetha and Vamsi is cleared, and Vamsi brings Prahlad to justice.

== Cast ==
- Nagarjuna as Inspector Vamsi Krishna
- Amala as Geetha (dubbed by Saritha)
- Murali Mohan as Raghuram
- Sharat Saxena as Prahlad Rao
- Subhalekha Sudhakar as Inspector Shivram
- Giri Babu as Police Commissioner Narahari
- Annapoorna as Vamsi's mother
- Sukumari as Jolly, Geetha's aunt
- Jyothi as Nalini
- Suthivelu as Yadagiri
- Allu Ramalingaiah
- Chinni Jayanth
- Charuhasan in a cameo appearance
- Chota K. Naidu
- Bhimeswara Rao as Principal
- Prasanna Kumar as Vinod
- Rajeevi as Anarkali
- Potti Veerayya
- Husain

== Soundtrack ==
Nirnayam

Film score by Ilaiyaraaja
- Released: 1991
- Genre: Soundtrack
- Length: 25:06
- Label: Echo Music
- Producer: Ilaiyaraaja

Ilaiyaraaja chronology
Stuartpuram Police Station (1991)	Nirnayam (1991)	Chaitanya (1991)

Music composed by Ilaiyaraaja. Music released on ECHO Audio Company.

No.	Title	Lyrics	Singer(s)	Length
1.	"Hello Guru"	Ganesh Patro	S. P. Balasubrahmanyam	5:04
2.	"Mila Mila"	Veturi	Mano, S. Janaki	5:05
3.	"Epudepudepudani"	Sirivennela	S. P. Balasubrahmanyam, S. Janaki	4:48
4.	"Enta Enta Dooram"	Ganesh Patro	S. P. Balasubrahmanyam, Chitra	5:04
5.	"O Papalu"	Ganesh Patro	S. P. Balasubrahmanyam, Swarnalatha	5:04
Total length:				25:06
