= Madhavayyagari Manavadu =

- Directed by: Muthyala Subbaiah
- Written by: Ganesh Patro (dialogues)
- Screenplay by: Muthyala Subbaiah
- Story by: VMC Unit; Bhisetty (main story)
- Produced by: V. Doraswamy Raju
- Starring: Akkineni Nageswara Rao; Sujatha; Harish
- Cinematography: K. S. Hari
- Edited by: Gowtham Raju
- Music by: Vidyasagar
- Production company: VMC Productions
- Release date: 24 February 1992
- Running time: 120 minutes
- Country: India
- Language: Telugu

Madhavayyagari Manavadu (transl. Madhavayya's Grandson) is a 1992 Telugu-language drama film, produced by V. Doraswamy Raju under the VMC Productions banner and directed by Muthyala Subbaiah. It stars Akkineni Nageswara Rao, Sujatha, Harish and music composed by Vidyasagar.

== Plot ==
The film begins in a village where Madhavayya, a millionaire, is benevolent & flirtatious. He leads a delightful life with his ideal wife, Madhavi, and grandson, Vamsi Krishna, who is reared under their pampering as an innocent who loves him boundlessly. As Vamsi is the only heir to Madhavayya, he is surrounded by so many relatives who plot to usurp his wealth. Once Madhavayya discovers Vamsi is seriously ill, he immediately takes him to Bombay for treatment with his brother's son, Dr. Satyam. Amid, awfully, Vamsi dies in an accident, which Madhavayya hides from Madhavi as he does not want to lose her too. After a few days, Madhavi arranges a warm welcome, assuming it is the day of Vamsi's arrival. At that juncture, perturbed Madhavayya is about to break up when, staggeringly, a person who resembles Vamsi comes in. Right now, Madhavayya is in a dichotomy. He maintains silence to shield his wife and tries to discover the reality but fails. Parallelly, duplicate Vamsi is brilliant & intelligent, does all good works, encounters evildoers in the house & office, and makes Madhavayya proud. Now, Madhavayya starts liking him, ready to flourish his affection, but requests for the fact, and then he reacts. The reason behind his homecoming is to take revenge against him. After that, they challenge; unfortunately, Madhavi overhears the conversation and pleads like Vamsi not to suffer her husband. There, he declares himself as their son's first wife's son, Vamsi Mohan, who has been renounced due to the depravity of Madhavayya. Eventually, Madhavayya also learns veracity. On the other side, Satyam divulges the secret to the remaining black hats, and they intrigue Vamsi Mohan when Madhavayya cleverly safeguards him and ceases baddies. Here, Vamsi understands the virtue of his grandfather and seeks pardon from him. Finally, the movie ends happily, with Madhavayya affirming Vamsi Mohan as his grandson.

== Cast ==
- Akkineni Nageswara Rao as Madhavayya
- Sujatha as Madhavi
- Harish as Vamsi Krishna & Vamsi Mohan (Dual role)
- Narra Venkateswara Rao as Arjuna Rao
- Rallapalli as Dr. Satyam
- Mallikarjuna Rao as Manager Ananda Rao
- Suthi Velu as Srimannarayana
- Babu Mohan as Madhavayya's servant
- Nandini as Radha
- Chandrika
- Saraswathi as Sakuntala
- Jaya Shanthi as Pushpa

== Soundtrack ==
Madhavayya gari Manavadu

Film score by Vidyasagar
- Released: 1992
- Genre: Soundtrack
- Length: 22:02
- Label: LEO Audio
- Producer: Vidyasagar

Vidyasagar chronology
Kalikaalam (1992)	Madhavayya gari Manavadu (1992)	Chitram Bhalare Vichitram (1992)

Music composed by Vidyasagar. Lyrics were written by Veturi. Music released on LEO Audio Company.

No.	Title	Singer(s)	Length
1.	"Govardhanaala Konda"	S. P. Balasubrahmanyam	4:47
2.	"Nee Choopu Suprabhatham"	S. P. Balasubrahmanyam, Chitra	4:30
3.	"Adarale Pilla"	S. P. Balasubrahmanyam	4:15
4.	"Raaraa Maa Intidaka"	S. P. Balasubrahmanyam	4:23
5.	"Yamma Yamma"	S. P. Balasubrahmanyam, Chitra	4:07
Total length:			22:02
