= Nenjangal =

- Poster
- Directed by: Major Sundarrajan
- Written by: Krishna (dialogues)
- Story by: Rabi Ghosh
- Produced by: Vijayakumar
- Starring: Sivaji Ganesan; Lakshmi; Manjula; Vijayakumar
- Cinematography: T. S. Vinayagam
- Edited by: B. Kandhasamy
- Music by: Shankar–Ganesh
- Production company: Vanitha Film Productions
- Release date: 10 December 1982
- Country: India
- Language: Tamil

Nenjangal (transl. Hearts) is a 1982 Indian Tamil-language film, directed by Major Sundarrajan and produced by Vijayakumar. The film stars Sivaji Ganesan, Lakshmi, Manjula and Vijayakumar. It was released on 10 December 1982 and it marks the on-screen debut of Baby Meena as child actress.

== Cast ==
- Sivaji Ganesan
- Lakshmi
- Manjula
- Vijayakumar
- Jyothi
- Baby Meena
- Y.G. Mahendran
- Major Sundarrajan
- Thengai Srinivasan
- Thiagarajan
- Sudarshan as Bairava

== Production ==
When Vijayakumar was in search of a child actress to portray Ganesan's daughter, he found Meena and approached her mother to let her daughter act in the film to which she agreed.

== Soundtrack ==
The soundtrack was composed by Shankar–Ganesh and lyrics of the songs were penned by Vaali while the lyrics for an item number were penned by actor Vijayakumar.

Track listing
No.	Title	Lyrics	Singer(s)	Length
1.	"Amma Oru"	Vaali	T. M. Soundararajan
2.	"Kuthuna Kuthu"	Vijayakumar	Vani Jairam
3.	"Kanne Kannin"	Vaali	T. M. Soundarrajan, Vani Jairam
4.	"Ennayandri"	Vaali	Vani Jairam

== Critical reception ==
Thiraignani of Kalki felt it is carelessness on the part of the director to trivialise the story which should have been taken seriously. Balumani of Anna praised Ganesan's acting but felt Vijayakumar and Manjula just come and go and praised humour and Shankar Ganesh's music and concluded this is amongst those films which come and go unnoticed soon.
