= President Gari Pellam =

- Theatrical release poster
- Directed by: A. Kodandarami Reddy
- Written by: Thotapalli Madhu(dialogues)
- Screenplay by: A. Kodandarami Reddy
- Story by: Ramani; Madhu
- Produced by: V. Doraswamy Raju
- Starring: Nagarjuna; Meena
- Cinematography: V. S. R. Swamy
- Edited by: A. Sreekar Prasad
- Music by: M. M. Keeravani
- Production company: VMC Productions
- Release date: 30 October 1992
- Running time: 138 minutes
- Country: India
- Language: Telugu

President Gari Pellam (transl. President's wife) is a 1992 Indian Telugu-language film directed by A. Kodandarami Reddy and produced by V. Doraswamy Raju under VMC Productions. It stars Nagarjuna and Meena, with music composed by M. M. Keeravani. The movie was later dubbed into Tamil as Thalaivar Pondatti. This film recorded as a super hit.

== Plot ==
Raja's (Nagarjuna) brother Chandraiah (Chandra Mohan) works as a servant under Devudu (Satyanarayana), the president of the village. Swapna is the daughter of Devudu and has arguments with Raja. To take revenge on him, Swapna acts as she loves him and insults him in front of the villagers. Later Raja stands as president candidate opposite Devudu and challenges him that if he wins, Raja will marry his daughter to him, but if Raja loses, he should leave the village. Raja wins as president. The rest of the movie is about whether he will marry Swapna and how he will teach Devudu a lesson.

== Cast ==
- Nagarjuna as Raja
- Meena as Swapna
- Satyanarayana as Devudu
- Srikanth as Narendra
- Chandra Mohan as Chandraiah
- Kota Srinivasa Rao as Nadamuni
- Bramhanandam as Vadatala Vundellu
- AVS as Subrahmanyam
- Ali as Raja's friend
- Raja as Rambabu
- Chidatala Appa Rao as Sambrani
- Chitti Babu as Raja's friend
- Gautam Raju as Nandan Rao
- Visweswara Rao as Raja's friend
- Gadiraju Subba Rao as Puvvulapalem President
- Narsing Yadav as Bheemanna
- Annapoorna as Janaki
- Sudha as Lakshmi
- Haritha as Seetha
- Disco Shanthi as Chemki Puvvu (item number)
- Baby Sunayana as Bujji

== Production ==
The film was shot at Gummalododdi village and Kadiam.

== Soundtrack ==
President Gari Pellam

Film score by M. M. Keeravani
- Released: 1992
- Genre: Soundtrack
- Length: 26:53
- Label: Akash Audio
- Producer: M. M. Keeravani

M. M. Keeravani chronology
President Gari Pellam (1992)	President Gari Pellam (1992)	Jathi Malli (1993)

The music was composed by M. M. Keeravani. Lyrics written by Veturi. Music released on AKASH Audio Company.

No.	Title	Singer(s)	Length
1.	"Nuvvu Malletheega"	S. P. Balasubrahmanyam, Chitra	4:00
2.	"Aa Oddu Ee Oddu"	S. P. Balasubrahmanyam, Chitra	4:32
3.	"Mandoori"	S. P. Balasubrahmanyam	4:33
4.	"Paruvala Kodi"	S. P. Balasubrahmanyam, Chitra	5:00
5.	"Thassa Chekka"	S. P. Balasubrahmanyam, Chitra	4:02
6.	"Umma Kavali"	S. P. Balasubrahmanyam, Chitra	4:46
Total length:			26:53
