= Konchem Touchlo Vunte Cheputanu =

- DVD cover
- Directed by: Vamsy
- Written by: Sankaramanchi Pardhasaradhi (dialogue)
- Screenplay by: Vamsy
- Story by: Sankaramanchi Pardhasaradhi
- Produced by: V. Vijay Kumar Varma; V. Doraswamy Raju (presenter)
- Starring: Sivaji; Veda
- Cinematography: M. V. Raghu
- Edited by: Basva Paidyreddy
- Music by: Chakri
- Production company: VMC Productions
- Release date: 4 December 2004
- Country: India
- Language: Telugu

Konchem Touchlo Vunte Cheputanu (transl. If you are in touch, I'll tell) is a 2004 Indian Telugu-language romantic drama film directed by Vamsy and starring Sivaji and Veda.

== Plot ==
Kalidasu (Sivaji) is suicidal due to his financial situation but JK (Prakash Raj) saves him and promises him money.

Kalidasu sees Alakananda (Veda), the daughter of a millionaire, on a TV show and it is love at first sight. Whether Alakananda accepts Kaludasu's love or not forms the rest of the story.

== Cast ==
- Sivaji as Kalidasu
- Veda as Alakananda
- Prakash Raj as JK
- M. S. Narayana
- Brahmanandam
- Krishna Bhagavaan
- Jeeva
- Venu Madhav
- Suman Setty
- Chitram Srinu
- AVS
- Ali
- Kondavalasa
- Surya
- Jogi Naidu
- Kanchi
- Duvvasi Mohan
- Shankar Melkote
- Raja Sridhar
- Gundu Sudarshan
- Bhuvaneswari
- Draksharamam Saroja
- Apoorva
- Madhu
- Archana Roy
- Bank Suresh
- Krishneswara Rao
- Prasada Murthy

== Soundtrack ==
The songs were composed by Chakri. All lyrics were written by Vennelakanti.

Track listing
| No. | Title | Singer(s) | Length |
|---|---|---|---|
| 1. | "Valapula Varam" | Kausalya, Chakri | 4:25 |
| 2. | "Unnattuga Lenattuga" | Kausalya, Hariharan | 6:04 |
| 3. | "Sarele Sarele" | Chakri, Kausalya, Hariharan | 4:44 |
| 4. | "Nee Kuluku Jamaku Jam" | Chakri, Kausalya | 3:49 |
| 5. | "Hello Annanu Monna" | Venu, Kausalya | 4:03 |
| 6. | "Chilipi Kanula Teeyani" | Hariharan, Kausalya | 4:08 |
| Total length: | | | 27:13 |

== Reception ==
A critic from Idlebrain.com wrote that "KTVC is a typical Vamsi's film with love, crime and comedy entangled".
