= Seetharamayya Gari Manavaralu =

- Theatrical release poster
- Directed by: Kranthi Kumar
- Screenplay by: Kranthi Kumar; Ganesh Patro (dialogues)
- Story by: VMC Unit
- Based on: Navvina Kanneelle by Manasa
- Produced by: V. Doraswamy Raju
- Starring: Akkineni Nageswara Rao; Meena
- Cinematography: K. S. Hari
- Edited by: A. Sreekar Prasad
- Music by: M. M. Keeravani
- Production company: VMC Productions
- Release date: 11 January 1991
- Running time: 131 min
- Country: India
- Language: Telugu

Seetharamayya Gari Manavaralu (transl. Seetharamayya's granddaughter) is a 1991 Indian Telugu-language drama film directed by Kranthi Kumar, and produced by V. Doraswamy Raju under the VMC Productions banner. The film stars Akkineni Nageswara Rao, Meena and Rohini Hattangadi with the music composed by M. M. Keeravani. Kumar also wrote the screenplay, based on the novel Navvina Kanneelle by Manasa. The plot follows Seetha (Meena) who arrives from the US to visit her grandparents, Seetharamayya (Rao) and Janakamma (Hattangadi) who are uninformed of her parents' accidental death.

It was featured in the 15th IFFI' 92 Indian Panorama section. The film won three Filmfare Awards South, three Nandi Awards and four Cinema Express Awards. The film was remade in Malayalam as Sandhwanam (1991), in Kannada as Belli Modagalu (1992), and in Hindi as Udhaar Ki Zindagi (1994).

== Plot ==
The film begins in a village adjacent to the river Godavari. The film revolves around Seetharamayya (Akkineni Nageswara Rao), a highly respected elder in his village. He lives a traditional, dignified life with his wife, Janakamma (Rohini Hattangadi), and commands respect from everyone around him. However, his personal life is scarred by a painful past — his only son had gone against his wishes by marrying a woman of his choice. This leads to bitter family disputes and estrangement. Seetharamayya, feeling betrayed, cuts off ties with his son.

Years later, the son and his wife die tragically in a car accident, leaving behind their daughter, Seetha (Meena). Having been raised in the United States, Seetha grows up unaware of the complexities and conflicts that had separated her from her grandparents. After finishing her studies, she decides to visit her grandparents in India, driven by love, curiosity, and a desire to reconnect with her roots.

When Seetha arrives, she is warmly welcomed by her grandmother, Janakamma, who is overjoyed to see her. However, Seetharamayya, still haunted by the memory of his son’s defiance, is hesitant and cold toward her at first. Despite his rigid exterior, Seetha’s innocence, affection, and respect slowly begin to soften his heart. She becomes a bridge between tradition and modernity, bringing joy and life back into the household.

When Seetha learns the truth about the strained relationship between her father and grandfather, she takes it upon herself to heal those wounds. Through her persistence, love, and sacrifices, she not only wins her grandfather’s affection but also restores harmony to the fractured family.

Seetharamayya finally accepts Seetha, recognizing her as the beloved granddaughter who carries forward his family’s legacy. The reconciliation represents forgiveness, love, and the enduring strength of family bonds.

== Cast ==
- Akkineni Nageshwara Rao as Seetharamayya
- Meena as Seeta
- Rohini Hattangadi as Janakamma
- Dasari Narayana Rao as Subbaraju
- Kota Srinivasa Rao as Veerabhadraiah
- Murali Mohan as Dr. Vivekam
- Tanikella Bharani as Govinda Rao
- Sudhakar as Pavan Kumar
- Sudarshan as Kaasi
- Narayana Rao as Lawyer Chakravarthy
- Raja as Dr. Srinivasa Murthy / Vaasu
- Chidatala Appa Rao
- Telangana Shakuntala
- Sudha Rani as Sumathi
- Srilatha as Shyamala
- Chandrika as Chinna Papa
- Saraswathi
- Master Amith as Banty

== Review ==
Sakshi.com summarised the movie as "The film is remembered for its emotional depth, performances, and portrayal of the delicate bond between grandparents and grandchildren. Even decades later, it resonates as a story of love, duty, and reconciliation".

== Production ==
The film was shot at Lolla village in Atreyapuram and also shot at Kadiyam. Tata Manavaralu was originally considered as title but Nageswara Rao did not want any comparison to the old film of the similar name.

== Soundtrack ==
Seetharamayya gari Manavaralu

Film score by M. M. Keeravani
- Released: 1991
- Genre: Soundtrack
- Length: 19:58
- Label: SURYA Music
- Producer: M. M. Keeravani

M. M. Keeravani chronology
Dagudumuthala Dampathyam (1990)	Seetharamayya gari Manavaralu (1991)	People's Encounter (1991)

Music composed by M. M. Keeravani. Lyrics were written by Veturi. Music released on SURYA Music Company.

No.	Title	Singer(s)	Length
1.	"Poosindi Poosindi"	S. P. Balasubrahmanyam, K. S. Chithra	4:14
2.	"Badharagiri Ramayya"	S. P. Balasubrahmanyam, K. S. Chithra	3:07
3.	"Kaliki Chilakala Koliki"	K. S. Chithra	3:44
4.	"Velugu Rekhalavaru"	K. S. Chithra, Jikki	4:27
5.	"Oa Seetha Hallo"	S. P. Balasubrahmanyam	2:40
6.	"Sathyanarayana Vratha-Slokas"	K. S. Chithra	1:46
Total length:			19:58

== Awards ==
Filmfare Awards

- Best Film – Telugu – V. Doraswamy Raju – won
- Best Director – Telugu – Kranthi Kumar – won
- Best Actor – Telugu – Akkineni Nageswara Rao– won

Nandi Awards - 1990

- Second Best Feature Film - Silver – V. Doraswamy Raju
- Best Director – T. Kranthi Kumar
- Best Female Playback Singer – K.S. Chithra for "Kaliki Chilkala Koliki"

Cinema Express Awards

- Best Film – VMC Productions – won
- Best Actor – Akkineni Nageswara Rao – won
- Best Actress – Meena – won
- Best Director – Kranthi Kumar – won
