= English Pellam East Godavari Mogudu =

1999 Indian Telugu-language film

- Audio cassette cover
- Directed by: R. Suresh Varma
- Written by: Posani Krishna Murali (Story, screenplay & dialogues)
- Produced by: V. Doraswamy Raju
- Starring: Srikanth; Ramya Krishna
- Cinematography: K. Dattu
- Edited by: A. Sreekar Prasad
- Music by: Mani Sharma
- Production company: VMC Productions
- Release date: 11 March 1999
- Running time: 135 minutes
- Country: India
- Language: Telugu

English Pellam East Godavari Mogudu (lit. 'English wife, East Godavari husband') is a 1999 Indian Telugu-language drama film directed by R. Suresh Varma and written by Posani Krishna Murali. Produced by V. Doraswamy Raju under the banner of VMC Productions, the film stars Srikanth and Ramya Krishna in the lead roles, with music composed by Mani Sharma. The film was released on 11 March 1999.

== Plot ==
The film tells the story of a Telugu girl, Sirisha, who was born and raised in the United States. Known for her arrogant and assertive nature, she comes to her native East Godavari district, where her behavior causes tension with the locals. Sambasiva Rao is a simple village boy who, despite Sirisha's haughty attitude, slowly manages to win her trust and affection. Eventually, Sirisha, believing in Sambasiva Rao, agrees to marry him. However, Sambasiva Rao later reveals his true identity, leaving Sirisha to confront the consequences.

== Cast ==
- Srikanth as Sambasiva Rao
- Ramya Krishna as Sirisha
- Murali Mohan
- Brahmaji
- Prasad Babu
- Manya
- Atluri Pundarikakshayya
- Jeeva
- Chitti Babu
- Annapurna
- Sana
- Rajitha
- Jayasudha (guest appearance)
- Posani Krishna Murali (guest appearance)

== Production ==
The film was directed by R. Suresh Varma and produced by V. Doraswamy Raju under the banner of VMC Productions. The music was composed by Mani Sharma. Blending romance and drama, the film explores the cultural clash between a Telugu woman, raised in the West, and her husband, deeply rooted in traditional rural life. The majority of the filming took place in rural Andhra Pradesh.

== Music ==
The film's music was composed by Mani Sharma, with lyrics penned by Vennelakanti and Veturi. Audio soundtrack was released on Mayuri Audio label.

No.	Title	Lyrics	Singer(s)	Length
1.	"East Nunchi"	Vennelakanti	Sujatha
2.	"Ettundi Abbayi"	Veturi	S. P. Balasubrahmanyam, K. S. Chithra
3.	"Emite Pilla Nee Goppa"	Veturi	S. P. Balasubrahmanyam, S. P. Sailaja
4.	"Kokkoroko Punjula"	Veturi	S. P. Balasubrahmanyam, Swarnalatha
5.	"Jarigina Katha"	Veturi	S. P. Balasubrahmanyam
6.	"Mudda Pasupe Chalu"	Veturi	Sri Vardhini, Sri Keerthana

== Reception ==
In the book Fashion and Motherhood: Image, Material, Identity, Indira Jalli analyzed the film and its portrayal of a Western-raised woman.
