= Vasavi Kanyaka Parameshvari =

Hindu goddess

Vasavi Kanyaka Parameswari
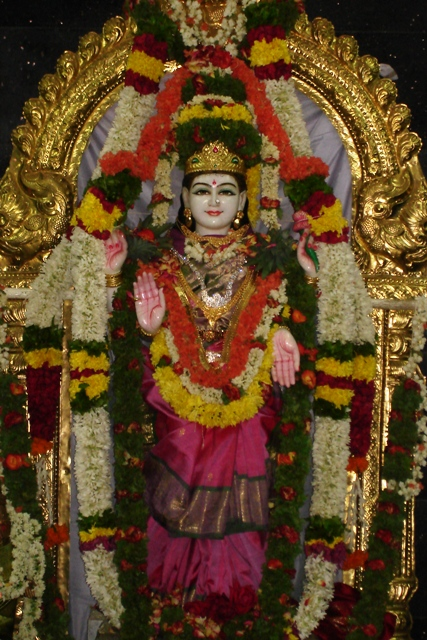
- Murti of the goddess
- Venerated in: Vaishnavism, Shaivism, Shaktism
- Affiliation: Lakshmi, Parvati, Devi
- Adherents: Komati or Arya Vysya
- Texts: Vasavi Puranamulu, Regional tales of Penugonda kshetram, Sri Pada SriVallabha Charitam
- Region: Vasavi Penugonda, Andhra Pradesh

Vasavi Kanyaka Parameshvari is a Hindu goddess, primarily revered by the Komati community of South and Central India. She is recognized as a Kanyaka form of Parvati in Shaivism, while in Vaishnavism she is identified as Lakshmi.

She is regarded to be a kuladevata, Goddess of the clan by members of the Komati community which is known as Vysya community in Andhra Pradesh, as well as the Arya Vaishya, Kalinga Vaishya, Arava Vaishya, Marathi Vaishya, Beri Vaishya, and the Trivarnika Vaishya communities, as per the various versions of the Vasavi Puranamulu, written in Telugu during the 18th century CE, ancient tales of Penugonda Kshetram, and Sri Pada Sri Vallabha Charitamrutham sacred texts.

The Jaina Komatis venerate her as Shanti Matha Vasavi, who is regarded to have promoted ahimsa for the benefit of all mankind, and averted warfare and loss of life through peaceful means.

== Legend ==
There is no authentic version of Vasavi's legend, and different versions exist amongst classes who are both Komati and non-Komati. The oral accounts sung by bards vary amongst regions, religious sects, castes, and sub-castes.

According to legend, a powerful Chalukya monarch called Vishnuvardhana ruled Andhra in the 11th century CE. During this period, a prominent Vaishya named Kusuma Sreshti lived at Penugonda, under the king's domain. Due to his wisdom, the king treated the man like a chieftain. Due to his childlessness, the merchant prayed to Virupaksha, who blessed him with a son, Virupaksha, as well as a daughter, Vasavi, who grew up to become a comely and pious maiden. She caught the attention of the king, who wished to marry her. Despite the fact that her parents objected to the match, they could not dissuade the king of his desire. On the day of her wedding, the bride, her parents, as well as all the leaders of the community's 102 gotras showed their opposition by leaping into the homam fire, performing the act of agni pravesham. After her death, Vasavi's soul was sanctified at Penugonda, and elevated to the status of a deity.

The legend is said to exemplify the concept of ritual pollution in Hinduism, where Vasavi chooses to end her life rather than forcibly marry the king, who was both already married, and belonged to a different varna from her.

== Traditions ==
=== Shaivism ===
The Jangam Komatis are a sub-group of the Veerashaivas, who believe Kanyaka became an ardent devotee of Shiva, who turned into a mendicant.

The Shaivaite Komatis see Kanyaka as Kanyaka Parameshvari. She is regarded to have cursed a king and killed him. She later showed herself as an incarnation of Parvati, and went to Kailasa, marrying the form of Shiva worshipped as Nagareshwara. This tradition is more common among Beri Komatis and Gavaras.

=== Vaishnavism ===
Sections of the Komatis, mainly the Trivarnikas and Gavara Komatis, for whom Venkateshvara is the family deity, follow Vaishnavism, and for them, Kanyaka is an incarnation of the goddess Lakshmi. This historical tradition stemmed when Vaishnavism spread southwards during the reign of King Vishnuvardhana, leading to a decline of Jainism and Buddhism.

=== Jainism ===
Komatis who practice Jainism worship the deity as Shanti Matha Vasavi Devi, the one who convinced the king to give up his kingdom, and later causing him to become a Jain monk through the teaching of ahimsa. She is believed to have blessed all Komatis to take up ahimsa and prosper in trade.

== In popular culture ==
Shri Kanyaka Parameshvari Kathe was a big screen Kannada movie released in 1966 starring Kalpana as Sri Kanyaka Parameshvari and Dr. Raj Kumar, Pandhari Bai, BS Dwaraknath, Ramachandra Shastry, Narasimha Raju and Ramadevi as the main cast. This movie was produced and directed by Hunsur Krishnamurthy.

In 2012 a Telugu movie called Sri Vasavi Vaibhavam was released depicting the goddess's life. The actress Meena acted as the goddess Parvati and actress Suhasini played the main role of goddess Kanyaka Parameshvari. Ramya Krishnan played goddess Parvathi in the film Sri Vasavi Kanyaka Parameswari Charitra (2014).
