= Sravanthi (film) =

1985 Telugu romance film

- Directed by: Kranthi Kumar
- Produced by: K. Kesava Rao; Jaya Krishna
- Starring: Mohan; Suhasini Maniratnam; Sarath Babu
- Music by: K. Chakravarthy
- Distributed by: Mudhu Art Movies
- Release date: 16 January 1985
- Country: India
- Language: Telugu

Sravanthi is a 1985 Telugu romance film directed by Kranthi Kumar. The film was remade in Tamil in 1986 as Revathi starring Revathi and Suresh.

== Plot ==
The film chronicles the emotional evolution of a young girl as she transforms into a resilient woman. She knowingly marries a man battling terminal cancer, who soon succumbs to the illness. After gradually overcoming her grief, she rebuilds her life and marries a widower, and has a little daughter. But her second husband becomes intolerant of the love and affection she shows towards him. Ultimately, she finds herself isolated once again, dedicating her life to raising her stepdaughter and caring for her first husband's parents.

== Cast ==
- Mohan
- Suhasini Maniratnam as Sravanti
- Sarath Babu
- Subhalekha Sudhakar
- Mucherla Aruna
- Nirmalamma

== Sound track ==
Music was composed by K. Chakravarthy with lyrics were written by Veturi.

Telugu
No.	Title	Singer(s)	Length
1.	"Mounam alaapana"	S. P. Balasubrahmanyam, P. Susheela	4:16
2.	"Navvutu Vellipo (Solo)"	S.P. Balasubramaniam	4:30
3.	"Navvutu (duet)"	S. P. Balasubrahmanyam, P. Susheela	3:02
4.	"Sravanthi Sravanthi (title song)"	S. P. Sailaja	2:03
Total length:			14:11

Later the movie was dubbed into Tamil with the same title 'Sravanthi' lyrics were written by Vaali

Tamil (Dubbed version)
No.	Title	Singer(s)	Length
1.	"Mounam Kaadhal Mozhi"	S. P. Balasubrahmanyam, S. P. Sailaja	4:16
2.	"Poovai Pol Vaazhava (Solo)"	S.P. Balasubramaniam	4:30
3.	"Poovai Pol Vaazhava (duet)"	S. P. Balasubrahmanyam, S.P. Sailaja	3:02
4.	"Sravanthi Sravanthi (title song)"	S. P. Sailaja	2:03
5.	"Kai Thoda Pogum Nayagan"	S. P. Sailaja, Ramesh	4:17
Total length:			18:28

== Awards ==
National Film Awards

- National Film Award for Best Feature Film in Telugu - 1986
