= L. V. Gangadhara Sastry =

Indian singer and composer (born 1967)

Dr. L. V. Gangadhara Sastry
- డా || లక్కావఝల వేంకట గంగాధర శాస్త్రి
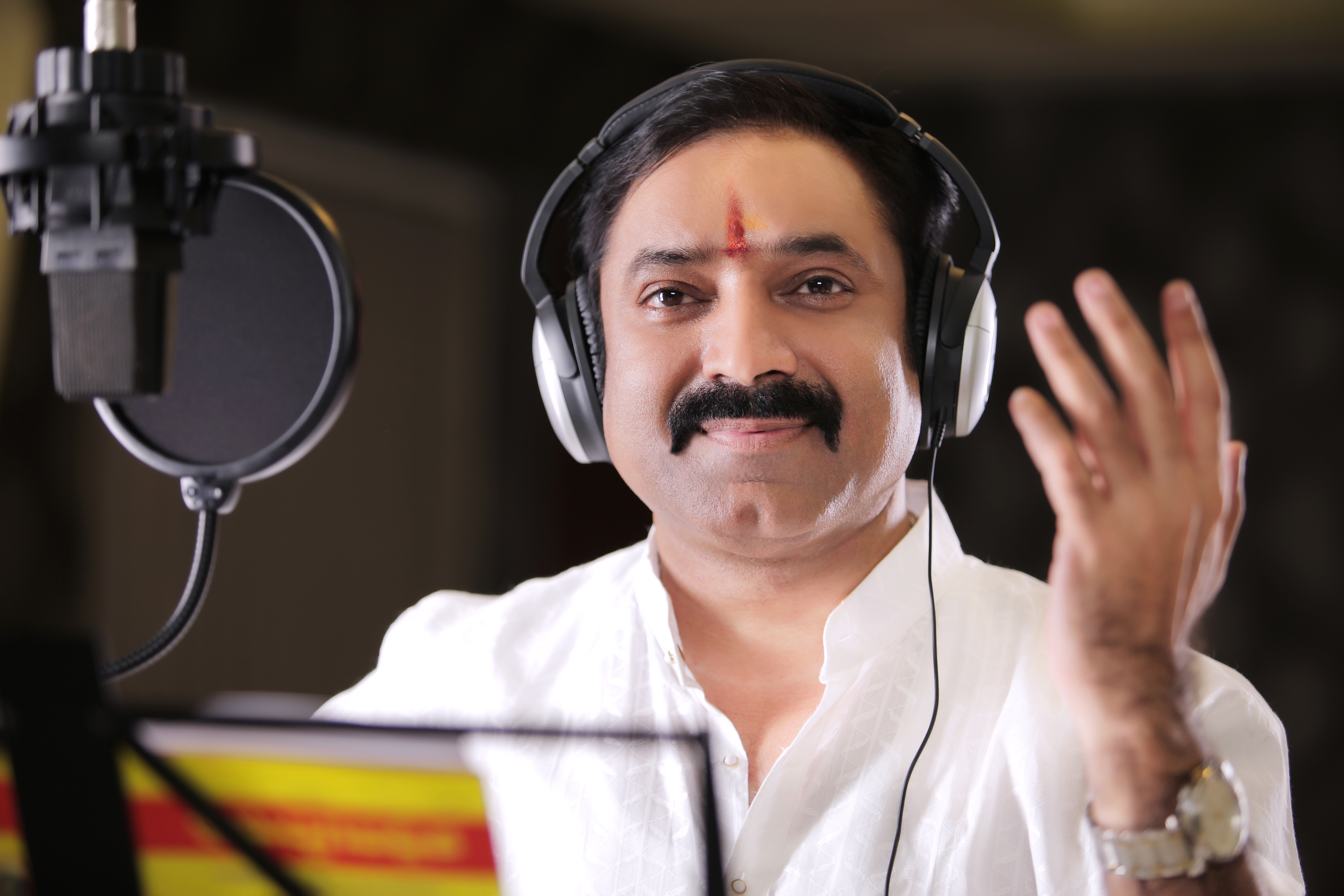
- Born: Lakkavajhala Venkata Gangadhara Sastry; 27 June 1967 (age 59); Avanigadda, Krishna district, Andhra Pradesh, India
- Education: B.A
- Alma mater: Acharya Nagarjuna University
- Occupations: singer, preacher, propagator of Bhagavadgita, Founder, chairman of Bhagavadgita foundation
- Spouse: Archana
- Children: Viswa Teja; Keerthi Priya
- Parents: L. Kasiviswanadha Sarma (father); L. Srilakshmi (mother)

Dr.Lakkavajhala Venkata Gangadhara Sastry is an Indian singer and composer. He established Bhagavadgita foundation to spread its importance. He recorded complete verses of Bhagavadgita in audio format. As a playback singer, he sang more than 100 songs in Telugu and Kannada films.

== Personal life ==
Sri Dr. L.V. Gangadhara Sastry was born on 27 June 1967 in Avanigadda, Krishna district, Andhra Pradesh, to L. Kasiviswanadha Sarma and Srilakshmi. His parents had some knowledge of classical music. He learned music basics from them. He became a follower of Ghantasala. He completed a B.A from Acharya Nagarjuna University. He worked as a film journalist in Eenadu group from 1990 to 2002.

== Bhagavadgita ==
He recorded over 700 verses along with Telugu meanings after 7 years of extensive research.

== Awards ==
He received Kala Ratna award from the government of Andhra Pradesh in 2017 and Sangeet Natak Akademi Award in 2023.
