= V. Doraswamy Raju =

Indian film producer, distributor, and politician (1941–2021)

Member of Legislative Assembly Andhra Pradesh
- In office 1994–1999
- Constituency: Nagari
- Chief Minister(s): N. T. Rama Rao; N. Chandrababu Naidu

Personal details
- Born: September 8, 1941 Chittoor District, Madras Presidency, British India
- Died: January 18, 2021 (aged 79) Hyderabad, Telangana, India
- Party: Telugu Desam Party
- Occupation: Film producer; distributor; politician

V. Doraswamy Raju (8 September 1941 – 18 January 2021) was an Indian film producer, distributor, and politician. He produced and distributed several Telugu films under his banner VMC Productions. He served as a Member of the Legislative Assembly from the Telugu Desam Party representing Nagari constituency, Andhra Pradesh between 1994 and 1999. He won two Nandi Awards and two Filmfare Awards.

== Early life ==
Doraswamy Raju was born in the Chittoor district of Andhra Pradesh to a family of farmers. He was married and has a son and daughter.

== Career ==
=== Films ===
Raju started VMC Productions in 1978, which was launched by actor-politician N. T. Rama Rao. His first film as a producer was Kirai Dada (1987), starring Nagarjuna. He later went on to produce successful films such as Seetharamayya gari Manavaralu (1991), President gari Pellam (1992), Madhavayya gari Manavadu (1992), Annamayya (1997), and Simhadri (2003).

In addition to production, he was also involved in film distribution in Rayalaseema. He has distributed over 750 films, giving him nickname "Rayalaseema Raju."

=== Politics ===
Raju began his political career in the early 1990s. He was elected as a Member of the Legislative Assembly from Nagari constituency in 1994. He contested the Telugu Desam Party ticket and defeated the Indian National Congress candidate R. Chenga Reddy. He also held positions such as member of TTD Board and president of Andhra Pradesh Film Chamber among others.

== Death ==
Raju died on 18 January 2021 at a private hospital in Banjara Hills, Hyderabad after suffering a cardiac arrest. He was 79. Filmmakers such as S. S. Rajamouli, Aswani Dutt, and Murali Mohan paid last respects to Raju.

== Filmography ==
- Kirai Dada (1987)
- Seetharamayya gari Manavaralu (1991)
- President gari Pellam (1992)
- Madhavayya gari Manavadu (1992)
- Annamayya (1997)
- English Pellam East Godavari Mogudu (1999)
- Simhadri (2003) - as presenter
- Konchem Touchlo Vunte Cheputanu (2005)
- Vengamamba (2009)
- Uyyale (2009)
- Sri Vasavi Vaibhavam (2012)
- Vijeta (2016)

== Awards ==
Filmfare Awards

- 1991: Best Film – Telugu – Seetharamayya gari Manavaralu
- 1997: Best Film – Telugu - Annamayya

Nandi Awards

- 1991: Second Best Feature Film - Silver – Seetharamayya gari Manavaralu
- 1997: Best Feature Film - Gold - Annamayya

Cinema Express Awards

- 1991: Best Film – Seetharamayya gari Manavaralu
