= Meena (actress) =

Indian actress (born 1976)

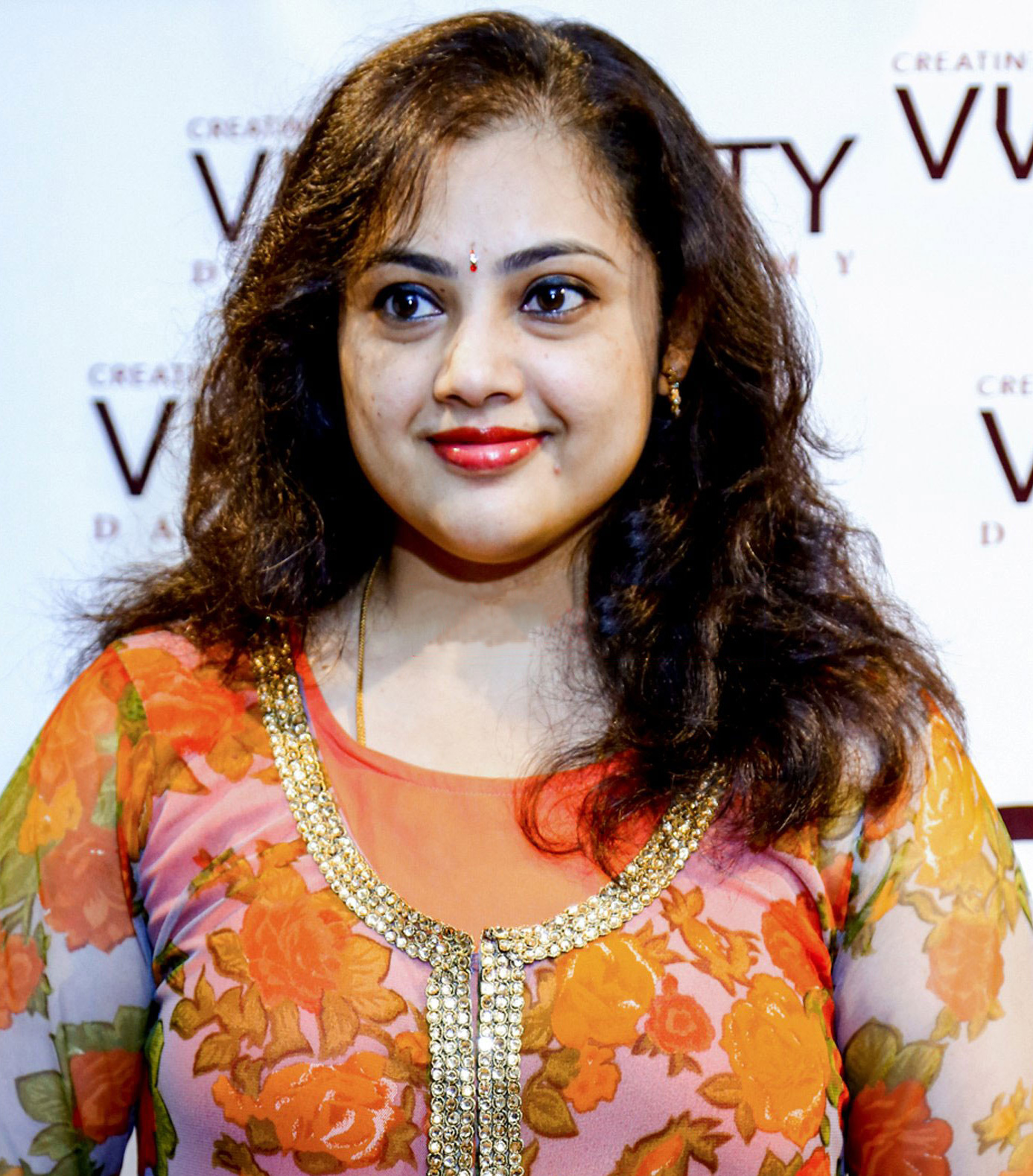
- Meena at Viscosity Dance Academy Launch
- Born: Meena Durairaj; 16 September 1976 (age 50); Madras, India
- Occupation: Actress
- Years active: 1982–present
- Spouse: Vidyasagar (m. 2009; died 2022)
- Children: 1

Meena Sagar (née Durairaj; born 16 September 1976) is an Indian actress known for her works in Tamil, Telugu and Malayalam films in addition to a few Kannada and Hindi films. Widely regarded as one of South Indian cinema's most successful and accomplished actresses, Meena is known for natural acting, expressive eyes, and successful collaborations with superstars. She became one of the most sought-after actresses in the South Indian film industry in the '90s. She has received numerous accolades, including two Filmfare Awards South, three Tamil Nadu State Film Awards, two Nandi Awards and two Cinema Express Awards. In 1998, she was honoured with the Kalaimamani Award by Government of Tamil Nadu.

Starting her career as a child artist, Meena's first appearance was in the Tamil film, Nenjangal (1982). She rose to fame as a child actor through the films Anbulla Rajinikanth (1984), Illalu Priyuralu (1984), Manasariyathe (1984) and Lakshmi Vanthachu (1986). Her first notable leading role came at 15, with Kasthuri Raja's Tamil film, En Rasavin Manasile (1991), which emerged as a highly successful film. The same year gave Meena her biggest breakthrough in Telugu cinema with the social drama, Seetharamayya Gari Manavaralu and its Malayalam remake, Sandhwanam. The former fetched her numerous awards including the Cinema Express Award. She went on to win numerous State awards for her performances in Rajeswari Kalyanam (1992) and Yejaman (1993). Her successful collaborations resulted in several commercial blockbusters throughout the 1990s and early 2000s with the films including Muta Mesthri (1993), Allari Alludu (1993), Sethupathi IPS (1994), Veera (1994), Nattamai (1994), Putnanja (1995), Muthu (1995), Avvai Shanmugi (1996), Muddula Mogudu (1997), Suryavamsam (1998), Friends (1999), Sneham Kosam (1999) and Vaanathai Pola (2000). Her role was critically acclaimed in films such as Bharathi Kannamma (1997), Varnapakittu (1997), Porkkaalam (1997), Rhythm (2000), Citizen (2001), Swathi Muthu (2003) and Vengamamba (2009). Her highest grossing films include Drishyam film series (2013, 2021) and Munthirivallikal Thalirkkumbol (2017).

Apart from acting, Meena has worked as a playback singer, TV show judge, and voice artist. She is also a classical dancer.

== Early life ==
Meena Durairaj was born on 16 September 1976 and was brought up in Madras. Her mother Rajamallika is from Kannur district of Kerala.

== Career ==
=== 1982-1986: Child artist ===
Meena started her career in 1982 as a child artist in the film Nenjangal, featuring Sivaji Ganesan in the lead role after he saw her at a birthday party. She has acted in several films along with Ganesan as a child artist. She has acted with Rajinikanth in two movies namely Enkeyo Ketta Kural and Anbulla Rajinikanth as a child artist. She appeared in over 45 films as a child.

=== 1990-1999: Debut as lead and continued success ===
Meena is regarded as one of the most successful actresses in South Indian cinema and has been part of several popular on-screen pairings with leading actors across multiple languages.

She began her acting career with her Telugu debut opposite Rajendra Prasad in Navayugam (1990). In the same year, she made her Tamil debut as a heroine in Oru Pudhiya Kathai. Her major breakthrough came with the Tamil film En Rasavin Manasile (1991), directed by Kasthuri Raja, in which she starred opposite Rajkiran. Her portrayal of the character Solaiyamma received widespread appreciation and established her popularity. The film was later remade in Telugu as Moratodu Naa Mogudu (1992), with Meena reprising her role. Meena entered the Malayalam film industry with Santhwanam (1991), where she played the daughter of Suresh Gopi’s character. The film’s success led to further opportunities with senior Malayalam actors.

In Telugu cinema, she gained further recognition with Chanti (1992), opposite Venkatesh. The film was a major commercial success, and Meena received a nomination for the Filmfare Award for Best Actress – Telugu. In the same year, she made her Hindi film debut opposite Chunky Pandey in Parda Hai Parda (1992). She went on to appear in several Telugu films in quick succession, including Allari Pilla (1992), directed by Kodi Ramakrishna; Allari Mogudu (1992) and Sundarakanda (1992), both directed by K. Raghavendra Rao; and President Gari Pellam (1992), opposite Nagarjuna and directed by A. Kodandarami Reddy.

Although Meena was widely known for portraying traditional and homely characters across South Indian cinema, she also took up glamour roles and established a distinct presence. She appeared in several female-centric Telugu films, such as Pellam Chepithe Vinali (1992), Allari Pilla (1993), and Bhale Pellam (1993). She starred in Rajeswari Kalyanam, directed by Kranthi Kumar, for which she won the Nandi Award for Best Actress. She subsequently appeared in notable films including Muta Mesthri and Yejaman. Her performance in Yejaman earned her the Tamil Nadu State Film Award for Best Actress. During this period, she also played the role of Sudha, a perceptive and intelligent wife, in Abbaigaru, and appeared in the comedy film Allari Alludu. Her on-screen pairing with Venkatesh became particularly popular in Telugu cinema.

After Yejaman, Meena continued her success in Tamil cinema with films such as Sethupathi IPS (1994), directed by P. Vasu and co-starring Vijayakanth. She later worked with Rajinikanth in Veera (1994) and Muthu (1995). This phase also included roles in Maaman Magal (1995), Sengottai (1996), Avvai Shanmugi (1996), and Bharathi Kannamma (1997).

Her biggest breakthrough in Malayalam cinema came through Varnapakittu (1997) where she starred opposite Mohanlal. She pair later in Olympian Anthony Adam (1999).

Meena’s Kannada film debut came with Putnanja (1995), opposite V. Ravichandran. She later paired with him again in Cheluva (1997) and Mommaga (1997). She co-starred with Jayaram in Malayalam films Kusruthi Kuruppu (1999) and Friends (1999).

=== 2000-2009 ===
In 2000, she appeared in Vikraman's Vaanathaippola as well as in a devotional role in Rama Narayanan's Palayathu Amman and Cheran's drama Vetri Kodi Kattu. Meena’s performance in the Tamil film Rhythm earned her the Best Actress award at the Cinema Express Awards. She collaborated successfully with actor Sudeepa in films such as Swathi Muthu (2003) and My Autograph (2006). Other notable Kannada films in this period include Sri Manjunatha (2001), Simhadriya Simha (2002), Game for Love (2003), and Mahasadhvi Mallamma (2005). After Anandha Poongatre (1999), she reunited with actor Ajith Kumar in Citizen (2001) and Villain (2002), both being successful at the box-office. Her roles in Ivan (2002), Shock (2004), Kadha Parayumbol (2007) and Kuselan (2008) were acclaimed by the critics. She makes her comeback with Vijayakanth in Mariyadhai (2009).

=== 2010-present: Matured roles ===
After her marriage, she returned to the big screen with the Kannada film, Hendtheer Darbar (2010), marking her comeback. She returned to Malayalam cinema, portraying the wife of Mohanlal’s character in Drishyam (2013), and appearing opposite Mammootty in Balyakalasakhi (2014). She reprised her role from Drishyam in its Telugu remake, Drushyam (2014). She subsequently made her return to Tamil cinema with Annaatthe (2021), reuniting with Rajinikanth.

The pair Mohanlal-Meena later collaborated in several films, including Drishyam (2013), Munthirivallikal Thalirkkumbol (2017), Drishyam 2 (2021), Bro Daddy (2022) and Drishyam 3 (2026).

== Other work ==
=== Playback singer ===
Meena has been a playback singer in two pop albums, called Pathinaru Vayathinile with actor Manoj and Kadhalism with actor Vikram, which she began recording in 2001. The latter album remains unreleased after Vikram was unable to make time for the project.

=== Dubbing ===
Meena dubbed for Padmapriya Janakiraman in Cheran's movie Pokkisham.

== Personal life ==
Meena married Vidyasagar, a Bangalore-based software engineer, on 12 July 2009 at Arya Vysya Samaj Kalyana Mandapam. The couple has a daughter, Nainika, who made her acting debut at the age of 5 in the Tamil film Theri (2016). Vidyasagar died on 28 June 2022 due to lung-related ailments.

== Filmography ==
Key
†	Denotes films that have not yet been released

=== Films ===
Year	Title	Role	Language	Notes
1982	Nenjangal	Kidnapped child	Tamil	Child artist
1982	Enkeyo Ketta Kural	Meena	Tamil	Child artist
1982	Parvaiyin Marupakkam	Geetha	Tamil	Child artist
1982	Theerpugal Thiruththapadalam	Priya	Tamil	Child artist
1983	Thandikkapatta Niyayangal	Playful child	Tamil	Child artist
1983	Sumangali	Doll-selling girl	Tamil	Child artist
1983	Siripuram Monagadu		Telugu	Child artist
1984	Thiruppam		Tamil	Child artist
1984	Illalu Priyuralu		Telugu	Child artist
1984	Yaadgar		Hindi	Child artist
1984	Bava Maradallu		Telugu	Child artist
1984	Kode Trachu	Roja	Telugu	Child artist
1984	Anbulla Rajinikanth	Rosy	Tamil	Child artist
1984	Oru Kochukatha Aarum Parayatha Katha	Rajani	Malayalam	Child artist
1984	Manasariyathe	Minimol	Malayalam	Child artist
1985	Panneer Nadhigal		Tamil	Child artist
1985	Uyire Unakkaga	Young Vijayanirmala Devi	Tamil	Child artist
1985	Rendu Rella Aaru	young Vighneswari	Telugu	Child artist
1985	Khooni	Aruna	Telugu	Child artist
1986	Penn Simham		Malayalam	Child artist
1986	Sirivennela		Telugu	Child artist
1986	Lakshmi Vanthachu	Playful child	Tamil	Child artist
1990	Kartavyam	Karuna	Telugu	
1990	Navayugam	Sumathi	Telugu	Debut as heroine
1990	Prajala Manishi	Roopa	Telugu	
1990	Oru Pudhiya Kadhai	Maha	Tamil	
1991	Seetharamayya Gari Manavaralu	Seetha	Telugu	
1991	En Rasavin Manasile	Cholaiamma	Tamil	
1991	Indra Bhavanam		Telugu	
1991	Idhaya Oonjal	Chithra	Tamil	
1991	Idhaya Vaasal	Vaani	Tamil	
1991	Jagannatakam	Jhansi	Telugu	
1991	Sandhwanam	Rajalakshmi	Malayalam	
1991	Chengalva Pudanda		Telugu	
1992	Chanti	Nandini	Telugu	
1992	Parda Hai Parda	Maya	Hindi	
1992	Allari Pilla	Nandini	Telugu	
1992	Allari Mogudu	Neelambari	Telugu	
1992	Sundarakanda	Nanchari	Telugu	
1992	President Gari Pellam	Swapna	Telugu	
1992	Pellam Chepte Vinali	Geetha	Telugu	
1992	Bangaru Maama	Kasthuri	Telugu	
1992	Moratodu Naa Mogudu		Telugu	
1992	Aswamedham	Dr. Bharati	Telugu	
1993	Rajeswari Kalyanam	Rajeshwari	Telugu	
1993	Konguchatu Krishnadu	Saccha	Telugu	
1993	Muta Mesthri	Buchamma	Telugu	
1993	Yejaman	Vaitheeswari Vaanavaraayan	Tamil	
1993	Abbaigaru	Sudha	Telugu	
1993	Allari Alludu	Sandhya	Telugu	
1994	Sethupathi IPS	Chandramathi	Tamil	
1994	Rajakumaran	Selvi	Tamil	
1994	Anga Rakshakudu	Meenu	Telugu	
1994	Bhale Pellam	Bharathi	Telugu	
1994	Veera	Devayanai	Tamil	
1994	Punya Bhoomi Naa Desam	Swathi	Telugu	
1994	Bobbili Simham	Venkatalakshmi	Telugu	
1994	Thai Maaman	Meena	Tamil	
1994	Nattamai	Meena	Tamil	
1995	Putnanja	Rose	Kannada	
1995	Oru Oorla Oru Rajakumari	Lakshmi Prabha	Tamil	
1995	Chilakapachcha Kaapuram	Radha	Telugu	
1995	Coolie	Vimala	Tamil	
1995	Marumagan	Manjula	Tamil	
1995	Nadodi Mannan	Meenakshi, Priya	Tamil	
1995	Muthu	Ranganayaki	Tamil	
1995	Aalu Magalu	Mallika	Telugu	
1995	Maaman Magal	Priya	Tamil	
1996	Sengottai	Meena	Tamil	
1996	Avvai Shanmugi	Janaki	Tamil	
1997	Bharathi Kannamma	Kannamma	Tamil	
1997	Varnapakittu	Sandra, Alina	Malayalam	
1997	Vallal	Annam	Tamil	
1997	Muddula Mogudu	Sirisha	Telugu	
1997	Cheluva	Meena	Kannada	
1997	Pasamulla Pandiyare	Vellayamma	Tamil	
1997	Panjaram		Telugu	
1997	Mommaga	Gowri	Kannada	
1997	Porkkaalam	Maragatham	Tamil	
1998	Ulavuthurai	Meena	Tamil	
1998	Naam Iruvar Nammaku Iruvar	Indu	Tamil	
1998	Suryavamsam	Swapna	Telugu	
1998	Kusruthi Kuruppu	Meera	Malayalam	
1998	Harichandra	Nandhini	Tamil	
1998	Gillikajjalu	Satyabhama	Telugu	
1998	Pape Naa Pranam	Priya	Telugu	
1999	Sneham Kosam	Prabhavathi	Telugu	
1999	Velugu Needalu	Radha	Telugu	
1999	Friends	Padmini	Malayalam	
1999	Perianna	Shenbagam	Tamil	
1999	Anandha Poongatre	Meenakshi	Tamil	
1999	Poovellam Kettuppar	Herself	Tamil	Cameo appearance
1999	Krishna Babu	Rama	Telugu	
1999	Bobbili Vamsham	Rajyalakshmi	Telugu	
1999	Olympiyan Anthony Adam	Angel	Malayalam	
1999	Iraniyan	Ponni	Tamil	
1999	Unnaruge Naan Irundhal	Mahalakshmi	Tamil	
1999	Manam Virumbuthe Unnai	Priya	Tamil	
2000	Vanathai Pola	Gowri Muthu	Tamil	
2000	Palayathu Amman	Palayathu Amman	Tamil	
2000	Vetri Kodi Kattu	Valli Muthuraman	Tamil	
2000	Doubles	Meena	Tamil	
2000	Rhythm	Chitra	Tamil	
2000	Maayi	Bhuvaneswari	Tamil	
2000	Dreams	Nirmala Mathan	Malayalam	
2000	Maa Annayya	Gowri	Telugu	
2000	Thenali	Meena (herself)	Tamil	Special appearance
2000	Anbudan	Shanthi	Tamil	Guest appearance
2001	Rishi	Indu	Tamil	
2001	Railway Coolie		Telugu	
2001	Citizen	Sevali	Tamil	
2001	Sri Manjunatha	Goddess Parvathi	Kannada	
2001	Rakshasa Rajav	Meera	Malayalam	
2001	Ammayi Kosam	Anjali	Telugu	
2001	Shahjahan	Meena	Tamil	Special appearance
2001	Grama Devathe	Angala Parameswari	Kannada	
2002	Angala Parameswari	Angala Parameswari Amman	Tamil	
2002	Dhaya	Thulasi	Tamil	
2002	Simhadriya Simha	Deepa	Kannada	
2002	Devan	Uma	Tamil	
2002	Ivan	Meena Kumari	Tamil	
2002	Namma Veetu Kalyanam	Meena	Tamil	
2002	Padai Veetu Amman	Padai Veetu Amman, Muthu Maariamman	Tamil	
2002	Villain	Thangam	Tamil	
2003	Mr. Brahmachari	Ganga	Malayalam	
2003	Paarai	Mallika	Tamil	
2003	Simhachalam	Simhachalam's wife	Telugu	
2003	Game for Love	Amrutha	Kannada	
2003	Aalukkoru Aasai	Eshwari	Tamil	
2003	Swathi Muthu	Lalitha	Kannada	
2004	Shock	Malini	Tamil	
2004	Puttintiki Ra Chelli	Wife	Telugu	
2004	Bharatasimha Reddy	Devudayya's wife	Telugu	
2004	Swamy	Swamy's wife	Telugu	
2004	Gowdru	Parvati	Kannada	Guest appearance
2004	Natturajavu	Maya	Malayalam	
2005	Mahasadhvi Mallamma	Mallamma	Kannada	
2005	Kannamma	Kannamma	Tamil	
2005	Udayananu Tharam	Madhumathi Udayabhanu	Malayalam	
2005	Chandrolsavam	Indulekha	Malayalam	
2006	My Autograph	Divya	Kannada	
2006	Karutha Pakshikal	Suvarnna	Malayalam	
2007	Kadha Parayumbol	Sridevi Balan	Malayalam	
2007	Black Cat	Meenakshi	Malayalam	
2008	Kuselan	Sridevi Balakrishnan	Tamil	Bilingual film Remake of Kadha Parayumbol
2008	Kathanayakudu	Sreedevi	Telugu	Bilingual film Remake of Kadha Parayumbol
2008	Magic Lamp	Anupama	Malayalam	
2009	Mariyadhai	Radha	Tamil	
2009	Katha, Samvidhanam: Kunchacko	Ann Mary	Malayalam	
2009	Vengamamba	Tarigonda Vengamamba	Telugu	
2010	Dasanna	Malli	Telugu	
2010	Hendtheer Darbar	Radha	Kannada	
2011	Thambikottai	Shanmugapriya Shanmugam	Tamil	
2012	Sri Vasavi Vaibhavam	Goddess Parvati	Telugu	
2013	Sri Jagadguru Aadi Sankara	Gangadevi	Telugu	
2013	Drishyam	Rani George	Malayalam	
2014	Balyakalasakhi	Majeed's mother	Malayalam	
2014	Drushyam	Jyothi	Telugu	
2015	Mama Manchu Alludu Kanchu	Suryakantham	Telugu	
2017	Munthirivallikal Thalirkkumbol	Annyamma	Malayalam	
2018	Saakshyam	Raju Garu's wife	Telugu	Cameo Appearance
2020	Shylock	Lakshmi Ayyanar	Malayalam	
2021	Drishyam 2	Rani George	Malayalam	
2021	Annaatthe	Mangayarkarasi	Tamil	
2021	Drushyam 2	Jyothi	Telugu	
2022	Bro Daddy	Annamma	Malayalam	OTT release Disney+ Hotstar
2024	Aanandhapuram Diaries	Nandhini	Malayalam	
2026	Drishyam 3	Rani George	Malayalam	
TBA	Rowdy Baby †	TBA	Tamil	Filming

=== Web series ===
Year	Title	Role	Language	Platform	Notes
2019	Karoline Kamakshi	Kamakshi	Tamil	ZEE5	
2026	Secret Stories: Roslin	Shobha	Malayalam	JioHotstar	

=== Television ===
Year	Title	Role	Language	Channel	Notes	Ref.
2006-2008	Lakshmi	Lakshmi	Tamil	Sun TV	Soap opera	
2009	Kalyanam	Anandhi	Tamil	Sun TV	Soap opera	
2012	Boys VS Girls	Judge	Tamil	Star Vijay	Reality show	
2013	Bharthakkanmaarude Sradhakku	Judge	Malayalam	Asianet	Reality show	
2015	Pasamalargal	Herself	Tamil	Mediacorp Vasantham	Soap opera	
2015	Simply Kushboo	Guest	Tamil	Zee Tamil	Reality show	
2016	Dance Dance	Special Judge	Kannada	Star Suvarna	Reality show	
2017	Ningalkkum Aakaam Kodeeshwaran	Contestant	Malayalam	Asianet	Reality show	
2017	Junior Senior	Judge	Tamil	Zee Tamil	Reality show	
2019	Extra Jabardasth	Judge	Telugu	ETV	Reality show	
2020	Kodeeswari	Contestant	Tamil	Colors Tamil	Reality show	
2022	Panam Tharum Padam	Contestant	Malayalam	Mazhavil Manorama	Reality show	
2023	Super Ammayum Makalum	Special Judge	Malayalam	Amrita TV	Reality show	
2023	Super Jodi	Judge	Tamil	Zee Tamil	Reality show	
2023	Ente Amma Supera	Judge	Malayalam	Mazhavil Manorama	Reality show	
2024	Super Jodi	Judge	Telugu	Zee Telugu	Reality show	

== Awards and nominations ==
Year	Award	Category	Awarded for	Result	Ref.
1991	Cinema Express Awards	Best Actress	Seetharamayya Gari Manavaralu	Won	
1992	Nandi Awards	Best Actress	Rajeswari Kalyanam	Won	
1993	Tamil Nadu State Film Awards	Best Actress	Ejamaan	Won	
1996	Dinakaran Film Awards	Best Actress	Avvai Shanmugi	Won	
1997	Tamil Nadu State Film Awards	Best Actress	Porkkaalam	Won	
1997	Filmfare Awards South	Best Actress	Bharathi Kannamma	Won	
1997	Filmfans Association Awards	Best Actress	Bharathi Kannamma	Won	
1998	Kalaimamani Awards	Kalaimamani	Contribution to Tamil Cinema	Won	
2000	Cinema Express Awards	Best Actress	Rhythm	Won	
2002	Tamil Nadu State Film Awards	Best Actress	Ivan	Won	
2003	Filmfare Awards South	Best Kannada Actress	Swathi Muthu	Won	
2006	Filmfare Awards South	Best Kannada Actress	My Autograph	Nominated	
2009	Ugadi Puraskar Awards; TSR – TV9 Film Awards	Special Jury Award	Venkamamba	Won	
2013	Filmfare Awards South	Best Actress	Drishyam	Nominated	
2013	Asianet Film Awards; Vayalar Awards	Best Character Actress; Vayalar Film Award for Best Actress	Drishyam	Won	
2014	TSR – TV9 Film Awards	TSR – TV9 Special Jury	Drushyam	Won	

=== Television ===
Year	Title	Role	Language	Channel	Notes
1990	Anbulla Amma	Shyamala	Tamil	Doordarshan	
2005	Housefull	Show Host	Tamil	Jaya TV	
2006-2008	Lakshmi	Lakshmi	Tamil	Sun TV	
2007	Mastana Mastana season 1	Judge	Tamil	Sun TV	
2009	Kalyanam	Meera/Sujatha	Tamil	Sun TV	
2009	Tarikonda Venkamamba	Tarikonda Venkamamba	Telugu	SVBC TV	
2009	Boys VS Girls season 2	Judge	Tamil	Vijay TV	
2011	Jodi Number One Season 5	Special Judge	Tamil	Vijay TV	
2012	Nee Kongu Bangaram Ganu	Host	Telugu	MAA TV	
2012	Veera	Judge	Telugu	ETV	
2012	Super Kudumbam	Judge	Tamil	Sun TV	
2012	Anubandhalu	Sharada	Telugu	Gemini TV	
2013	Bharthakkanmarude Sradhakku	Judge	Malayalam	Asianet	
2014	Super Kutumbam	Judge	Telugu	Gemini TV	
2015	Manada Mayilada season 10	Judge	Tamil	Kalaignar TV	
2016	Dance Dance	Special Judge	Kannada	Star Suvarna	
2017	Junior Senior	Judge	Tamil	Zee Tamil	
2017	Ningalkkum Aakaam Kodeeshwaran	Contestant	Malayalam	Asianet	
2019	Lolluppa	Judge	Tamil	Sun TV	
2019	Extra Jabardasth	Judge	Telugu	ETV	
2021	Top Singer	Judge	Malayalam	Flowers TV	
