= Swathi (1984 film) =

- Theatrical release poster
- Directed by: Kranthi Kumar
- Written by: Kranthi Kumar
- Produced by: Kranthi Kumar
- Starring: Suhasini; Bhanu Chander; Sharada
- Cinematography: Hari Anumolu
- Edited by: Krishnam Raju
- Music by: K. Chakravarthy
- Distributed by: Sri Kranthi Chitra
- Release date: September 22, 1984
- Country: India
- Language: Telugu

Swathi is a 1984 Telugu-language drama film written, produced and directed by Kranthi Kumar. The film starred Suhasini, Bhanu Chander and Sarada in lead roles. Upon release the film received positive reviews and became instant hit at the box office. The film won four Nandi Awards, two Filmfare Awards South, and was premiered at International Film Festival of India. The film was remade in Hindi with same name and in Kannada as Usha.

== Plot ==
Swathi (Suhasini) lives with her mother Saraswathi, who brought her up as a single mother and has not revealed anything about her husband. And so, Swathi thinks that her father is a cheater. Saraswathi works as a nurse under doctor Jaggayya, who is also a widower with a daughter named Prasunna. Swathi gets closer to Chako, who is an unemployed graduate, and upon Chako's suggestion, Swathi gets her mother married to doctor Jaggayya, but observes a change in her mother's behaviour, who feels embarrassed to introduce Swathi as her daughter. So she leaves that house. Meanwhile, she meets her biological father who is actually a very nice person, but was a victim of ill fate. Finally, Swathi's step-sister gets married, during which her biological father Satyam dies. She goes the different schools and realizes that her family is not worth her. She was a strong girl, and she was trying to get her unmarried mother to get married.

== Cast ==
- Suhasini as Swathi
- Bhanu Chander as Chako
- Jaggayya
- Sarath Babu as Satyam
- Rajendra Prasad as Subba Rao
- Subhalekha Sudhakar as Kapil Dev
- P. L. Narayana as Narayana
- Sharada as Saraswathi
- Rama Prabha as Victoria Naidu
- Mucherla Aruna as Lakshmi
- Nithya Ravindran as Prasunna

== Songs ==
The lyrics for the film are written by Veturi Sundara Rama Murthy. The music is by Chakravarthi. The singers are S.P. Balasubrahmanyam, P. Suseela, S.P. Sailaja, Jayachandran and Anitha Reddy. There are 4 songs in the film.

== Awards ==
Filmfare Awards South

- Filmfare Best Film Award (Telugu) – Kranthi Kumar
- Filmfare Award for Best Telugu Actress – Suhasini

Nandi Awards

- Best Feature Film - Gold - Kranthi Kumar
- Best First Film of a Director - Kranthi Kumar
- Best Actress - Suhasini
- Best Dialogue Writer - Ganesh Patro
