= Komati (caste) =

Indian trading community

- Komati women, c. 1855–1862
- Classification: Forward caste
- Kuladevi (female): Vāsavi Kanyakā Parameśvari
- Religions: Hinduism • Jainism
- Languages: Kannada, Telugu, Odia(amongst Kalinga Komatis), Marathi(amongst Marathi Komatis), Hindi(including MP, Chhattisgarh and other Hindi speaking states)
- Country: India
- Region: Karnataka, Maharashtra, Telangana, Odisha, Andhra Pradesh, Telangana, Tamil Nadu
- Subdivisions: Arya Vysya (Ārya Vaiśya), Beeri Komati (Beeri Vaishya), Kalinga Komati (Kaliṅga Vaiśya), Thrivarnika Komati (Trivarṇika Vaiśya), Jaina Komati (Jaina Kōmaṭi),

The Gaumati (Kōmaṭi, Kaūmūti or Kūmaṭi) is a trading community which is currently organized as a caste. They are primarily found in the Central and South Indian states of Maharashtra, Andhra Pradesh, Telangana, Odisha, and Karnataka. Small communities of Komatis are also present in the neighbouring states of Madhya Pradesh, Tamil Nadu and Chhattisgarh. The members of the Komati caste are commonly engaged as moneylenders, businessmen, and shopkeepers. The community consists of many sects who are followers of Hinduism, namely the Gomata (Arya Vysya), the Thrivarnika, and the Kalinga, along with the Jaina Komatis who are followers of Jainism. Traditionally, most Komatis are vegetarian, due to their belief in ahimsa (nonviolence).

== Etymology and terminology ==
The origin of the word "Komati" is uncertain, and there are several speculative theories about it.

The affinity of the word "Komati" to "Gomata" has led to speculation that the word is derived from Gomata (Gomateshwara), the name of a Jain deity. This theory is supported by scholars such as C. Dwarakanath Gupta, and Jaisetty Ramanaiah; B. S. L. Hanumantha Rao also mentions this as the most reasonable of the theories, noting that it is a "derivation of the word from gomata, the great Jaina saint, which implies that they were followers of Gomata cult or were originally Jains". Gupta theorises the Komatis were originally traders from Gauda in Bengal, who adopted Jainism and followed the cult of Gomata. They later gave up Jainism and embraced Vedic Hinduism. Hanumantha Rao noted that the merchant classes preferred Jainism for gaining social status and respectability, and the erstwhile Banias became Gomati or followers of the Gomata cult in medieval times.

An alternative etymology mentioned by Gupta derives the name of the caste from the name of a river. He states that the Komatis are said to have originally lived on the banks of Gomati, a local name for the Godavari River. Yet another theory states that the name of the community is derived from the Telugu phrase konu-ammu-atti ("persons engaged in the exchange of goods"). Colonial ethnographers Edgar Thurston and R. V. Russell derived "Komati" from the Sanskrit term "Gomathi," believed to have the meaning of possessor or keeper of cows or Ko-mati ("to be cow minded"), which references their business acumen. An origin story accepted by many in the community is mentioned in the Kanyaka Purana(the caste-book / book of vaisyas) which states that Shiva gave them the name Go-mati ("cow-minded").

The term "Vaisya" has been used to refer to Komatis. The term "Komati" also has a denotation of "trader in the north of Madras and corresponded to chetty".

== History ==
There is epigraphic evidence that the term Komati was in use by the 11th century CE. The Komati merchants were associated with the town of Penugonda in the West Godavari district of Andhra Pradesh. Also the deity in Penugonda temple "Vasavi Kanyaka Parameshvari" is considered the Goddess of Komati Caste.

Inscriptions from the erstwhile Godavari, Krishna and Guntur districts from 11th century refer to the merchants referred to as the "Lords of Penugonda". These merchants identified as Vaiśyas, and a number of them cited non-Brahmanical gōtras in inscriptions. Historians regard this community as a precursor to the modern Komati community. The wealthier sections of the Komatis were addressed as Setti, Chetti or Chettiyar, all derived from the Sanskrit term Sreshthi. Their trade associations bore the name nagaram. They also participated in long-distance trade networks called pekkandru (literally "the many"). During the times of the Vijayanagara Empire, they moved to various parts of South India to further their businesses. During the empire's reign, they emerged as prominent merchants in South Indian trade, and sought to be considered as Vaishyas, the third highest varna in the Hindu caste system. During this time, the Komati and Balija competed for Vaisya status, with their conflict organised according to the right and left hand designation.

During the pre-colonial period, Komatis migrated "to the Malayan peninsula". Komatis also immigrated to Malaysia in the 1930s.

After the arrival of European trading companies, the Komati merchants were among the local traders that partnered with them. The British referred to them as "Committys" and often used the term generically for all merchants on the Coromandel coast. Among the "Committys" that the British dealt with were the bulk sellers of cloth and other export commodities, money lenders and money changers, and the individual shop-keepers. The second Chief Merchant of the British East India Company in Madras was a Komati called Kasi Viranna, appointed in 1669. There was fierce competition in George Town between the Tamil-speaking Beeri merchants, who formed the 'left-hand' caste division and the Komati and Balija merchants, who were referred to as the 'right-hand' caste division and who also led the right-hand castes. Other "right hand" castes included those of washermen, barbers, potters, tank-diggers, Yenadis (tribals), and outcastes. The competition between the divisions gave rise to riots and disputes in 1652 and 1707. The British were able to settle the disputes between left-hand and right-hand caste divisions amicably by resettling members to designated areas in George Town which is a small neighbourhood in the city of Chennai.

Niyogi Brahmins and the Maha-nad opposed the attempts of Komatis to designate themselves as Vaishyas. The Maha-nad was a multi-caste secret assembly that was created to exact retribution for breaking the rules and rights of castes. The Maha-nad was led by Niyogi Brahmins, Chettiars, and Telagas. Whenever the Komatis attempted to perform orthodox rites (especially the Upanayana ceremony), the Maha-nad would disrupt the ceremonies. The leaders of the Maha-nad would invade the house of Komatis and disrupt the sacrificial fire, rendering the ceremony useless. The Maha-nad would hire throngs of untouchables to attack the houses of Komatis and vandalise them with cattle bones, blood, human feces, and cattle feces mixed with water. The Vaidiki Brahmins who served as family priests for the Komatis were, unlike their Niyogi Brahmin counterparts, unconcerned with the idea that Komatis were infringing the boundaries between lower once-born and upper twice born castes. From 1784–1825, the majority of Komatis conducted the Upanayana ceremonies according to the Kanyaki Purana, a late medieval Telugu text sacred to the Komatis. These Upanayana ceremonies were completely in Telugu and conducted right before a Komati man's marriage, however a few wealthier Komati families were able to afford the orthodox Sanskrit Upanayana for younger bachelor men. The orthodox Sanskrit version allowed Komatis to perform further orthodox rites, and Vaidiki Brahmins were fine in officiating them. By 1825, the two versions had mixed into a part-Telugu, part-Sanskrit ceremony. By the 1830s, the Komatis began to phase out their native Telugu Komati elements of their rituals.

Lengthy legal battles ensued between the Vaidiki and Niyogi Brahmins on whether the Komatis were allowed to perform orthodox Vaishya rites. The Vaidikis argued that there was nothing in the Vedas that prohibited the Komatis from performing their own Telugu versions of the Upanayana. They stated that since it was a well known fact that Komatis called themselves Vaishyas and their men wore the sacred thread, there was no reason prohibiting them from moving on to the orthodox Sanskrit versions of the Upanayana ceremony. The Niyogis argued that while they did indeed call themselves Vaishyas, they could not be real Vaishyas due to Hindu chronology. According to Hindu chronology, Vaishyas had become extinct in Kali Yuga, the final time period in Hindu cosmology. Additionally, the Niyogis stated that the Komatis performed the Upanayana incorrectly due to the fact that the majority of them had it performed right before an man's marriage, rather than at age 24 which the orthodox texts state a Vaishya bachelor should have the ceremony conducted. They argued that since the Komatis could not be real Vaishyas and performed the Upanayana incorrectly, they had renounced their right to do so and that there was nothing they could do to atone for it. Legal battles ensued for decades, with British officials being unable to resolve the conflict and agitation between Komatis and Niyogis.

In the 1800s, Komatis were involved with the indigo and cotton trade. Komatis were "founding import-export firms, particularly in timber, sugar and liquor, construction and engineering companies, and western style banks" by the late 1800s. Komatis were involved with modernizing the commercial activity in Madras. Most Komatis were involved with the trade of oil, salt, grains, fruits and vegetables or were moneylenders or textile merchants. The Komati community during the colonial period changed their name to the Arya Vaisya Community.

By the 20th century, the Komatis had begun calling themselves according to the orthodox rishi gotras, rather than their native 102 gotras, which were inappropriate in accordance with the rules for Vaishya gotras. Over the 19th century, many Komatis became wealthy and in the 1901 census, were the only Telugu caste to be ranked as Vaishya. Spurred by this recognition, in 1905, prominent Komatis formed the Southern India Vysya Association, and in the 1921 census, tens of thousands of Komatis were recorded as Vaishyas.

== Practices ==
Vasavi Mata is considered the Kuladevata of Komatis. Kanyaki Purana – a late medieval sacred text in Telugu – is their key religious text. The Kanyaka Purana is an oral epic, and today the Skanda Purana is associated with a written Sanskrit version of the Kanyaka Purana off of which the Kanyaka Purana is performed. Records are available for a Kanyaka Parameswari temple built on a garden owned by the Komati community in George Town, Madras in the early 18th century.

Komatis regard themselves as a `twice-born' caste, meaning that they are allowed to wear a sacred thread following an initiation ceremony (the upanayana).

== Komati sub-groups ==
=== Arya Vysya ===
Arya Vysya (or Arya Vyshya) is a subset of the Komati caste. Arya Vysyas are traditionally vegetarian; ahimsa is important to Arya Vysyas. Orthodox Arya Vysyas follow rituals prescribed in the Vasavi Puranam, a religious text written in the late Middle Ages. The community were formerly known as Komati Chettiars but now prefer to be referred to as Arya Vysyas.

Some sources say that "Vysyas" are also called Arya Vysyas.

Arya Vysyas worship deities that belong to "both Vaishnavite and Saivite sects".

The Komati merchants along with Balijas became notable as trading communities during the period of the Vijayanagara Empire (1325-1565 CE), and desired Vaishya status.

The Mackenzie manuscripts provide a record of a copper plate grant of guru Bhaskaracharya (16th century CE), given by the 102 gotras which formed the Gavara grouping. According to the Vasavi Purana, the Vaisyas of Penugonda and 17 other towns belonged to a group of Vaisyas of 714 gotras. However, the 102 gotras of Gavaras separated out, and formed the Gavara Komati community.

=== Kalinga Vysya ===
Kalinga Vysyas are a group claim to be Komatis residing in Kalinga, Odia speaking regions of ancient India was a flux of kingdoms and territories that made communities to constantly change and adapt to the social and religious currents of the time. Kalinga Komatis were patrons of Buddhism and later to Lord Jaganath. Kalinga Vaishyas worship Kanyaka as Parameshwari (Shiva's Consort) along with Lord Jaganath. Kalinga Vaishyas being from Odisha consume a variety of Sea Food and Meat. Some festivals in Odisha offer meat to Gods and Godesses which aren't refused by Kalinga Vaishyas. Kalinga Vysyas are found in the old Kalinga country, extending into erstwhile Bengal (including 24 paraganas in present day Bangladesh) .

Castes from Kalinga (now Odisha, parts of West Bengal and other states) are classified as Forward Class.

=== Thrivarnika Vysya ===
Thrivarnika Vysyas call themselves Thrivarnika Vaishnavites. They say that their community started in the 11th century at the time of Ramanuja.

=== Jain Komati ===
Followers of Gommateshwara were traditionally Komati merchants spread across central and south India. Komatis still practice many aspects of Jainism like Ahimsa, Lacto-vegetarian diet and engaging in trade. They venerate the princess Shanthi Matha Vasavi for upholding Ahimsa and avoiding wars. Komatis were patrons of Jainism and built many Basadis for monks and temples for Santhi Matha Vasavi throughout Central and South India in the Dravidian style of architecture. Many temple grants, charities were done by wealthy Komati merchants, the discovery of the last Jain temple of the Komati era in present Telangana stands testament to the Komati patronage of Jainism.

== Demographics ==
Arya Vysyas are the largest subsect of Komatis, with Kalinga Vysyas being the second largest subsect. The Thrivarnika Vysyas are lesser in number than both Arya Vysyas and Kalinga Vysyas.
