= Kranthi Kumar =

Indian film director, producer and screenwriter

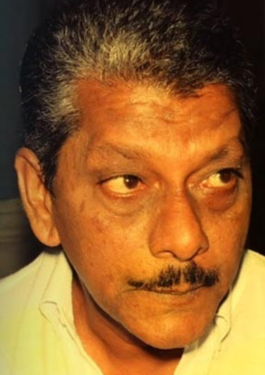
- Born: Talasila Kranthi Kumar; 5 April 1942; Penamaluru, Andhra Pradesh, India
- Died: 9 May 2003 (aged 61)
- Occupations: Producer; director; screenwriter

Talasila Kranthi Kumar (5 April 1942 – 9 May 2003) was an Indian film producer, director, and screenwriter known for his work in Telugu cinema. Over a career spanning nearly three decades, he produced 21 films and directed 19 films. He was recognized with multiple awards, including a National Film Award, five Nandi Awards, and two Filmfare Awards South.

Kranthi Kumar's notable directorial works include Sravanthi (1985), which won the National Film Award for Best Feature Film in Telugu, and Seetharamayya gari Manavaralu (1991), which was featured in the Indian Panorama section of the International Film Festival of India. In 2000, he directed 9 Nelalu, which was screened in a retrospective at the Toronto International Film Festival.

== Early life ==
Born in Penamaluru in Vijayawada, Andhra Pradesh, he studied M.A. and L.L.B. before entering the film world in 1968. He died on 9 May 2003.

== Filmography ==
Year	Title	Language	Producer	Director
1973	Sarada	Telugu	Yes	No
1974	Urvasi	Telugu	Yes	No
1976	Jyothi	Telugu	Yes	No
1977	Kalpana	Telugu	Yes	No
1977	Aame Katha	Telugu	Yes	No
1978	Pranam Khareedu	Telugu	Yes	No
1979	Punadhirallu	Telugu	Yes	No
1979	Sri Jagannath	Telugu	Yes	No
1980	Mosagadu	Telugu	Yes	No
1980	Sardar Papa Rayudu	Telugu	Yes	No
1981	Nyayam Kavali	Telugu	Yes	No
1981	Kirayi Rowdylu	Telugu	Yes	No
1982	Idi Pellantara	Telugu	Yes	No
1983	Sivudu Sivudu Sivudu	Telugu	Yes	No
1984	Swathi	Telugu	Yes	Yes
1984	Agni Gundam	Telugu	Yes	Yes
1984	Aaj Ka M.L.A. Ram Avtar	Hindi	Yes	No
1985	Sravanthi	Telugu	No	Yes
1985	Hero Boy	Telugu	No	Yes
1986	Swati	Hindi	No	Yes
1986	Aranyakanda	Telugu	No	Yes
1987	Saradamba	Telugu	No	Yes
1987	Gowthami	Telugu	No	Yes
1990	Neti Siddhartha	Telugu	Yes	Yes
1991	Seetharamayya Gari Manavaralu	Telugu	No	Yes
1992	Akka Mogudu	Telugu	No	Yes
1993	Rajeswari Kalyanam	Telugu	No	Yes
1993	Amma Koduku	Telugu	No	Yes
1993	Sarigamalu	Telugu	No	Yes
1995	Rikshavodu	Telugu	Yes	No
1994	Bhale Pellam	Telugu	No	Yes
1996	Baalina Jyothi	Kannada	No	Yes
1998	Padutha Theeyaga	Telugu	No	Yes
1999	Arundhati	Telugu	No	Yes
1999	Preminchedi Endukamma	Telugu	Yes	No
2000	9 Nelalu	Telugu	Yes	Yes

== Awards ==
National Film Awards

- National Film Award for Best Feature Film in Telugu (director) - Sravanthi (1986)

Filmfare Awards South

- Filmfare Best Film Award (Telugu) - Swathi (1984)
- Filmfare Best Director Award (Telugu) – Seetharamayya Gari Manavaralu (1991)

Nandi Awards

- Best Feature Film - Gold - Sarada (1973)
- Best Feature Film - Gold - Swathi (1984)
- Best First Film of a Director - Swathi
- Best Director - Seetharamayya gari Manavaralu (1991)
- Best Screenplay Writer - Sravana Meghalu (1986)

Cinema Express Awards

- Best Director – Seetharamayya gari Manavaralu (1991)
