= Hatya =

- Poster
- Directed by: Kirti Kumar
- Written by: Fazil; Kader Khan
- Based on: Poovinu Puthiya Poonthennal (Malayalam) by Fazil
- Produced by: Kirti Kumar; Govinda
- Starring: Govinda; Neelam; Sujitha; Anupam Kher; Babu Antony; Om Shivpuri; Raj Kiran; Johnny Lever; Satyen Kappu
- Cinematography: Lawrence D'Souza
- Edited by: A. R. Rajendran
- Music by: Bappi Lahiri (songs); Ilayaraaja (uncredited) (score)
- Production company: Sri Nirmala Devi Productions
- Distributed by: Bombino Video Pvt. Ltd.
- Release date: 3 June 1988
- Country: India
- Language: Hindi

Hatya (translation: Murder) is a 1988 Indian Hindi-language action thriller film directed and produced by Kirti Kumar. Released on 3 June 1988, the film stars an ensemble cast of Govinda, Neelam, Sujitha, Anupam Kher, Babu Antony, Om Shivpuri, Raj Kiran, Johnny Lever and Satyen Kappu. This film is a remake of Malayalam film Poovinu Puthiya Poonthennal (1986) which was remade into five other languages - in Tamil as Poovizhi Vasalile (1987), in Telugu as Pasivadi Pranam (1987), in Kannada as Aapadbandhava, in Bangladeshi as Khotipuron and in Sinhalese as Veda Barinam Vedak Nehe. Hatya (1988) was a hit at the box office. Hatya was mainly adapted from the Telugu remake of the original Malyalam one because of the differences between the Telugu version and Malyalam version and Hatya (1988) has the same differences that existed in the Telugu remake.

== Plot ==
On a dark night, an infant boy and his widowed mother, Meena, witness a disabled businessman, Surendra Mohan, and his henchman, Ranjeet, committing the murder of Surendra Mohan's manager, Mohan. As a result, Meena too is brutally stabbed to death by Surendra Mohan and Ranjeet, who proceed to throw Mohan's dead body in the sea, but the boy escapes from the criminals after witnessing the traumatic event. Sagar is a wealthy, but depressed young man, who has turned into an alcoholic as well as a street performer after the tragic deaths of his wife, Sheela, and their newborn son, Raja. After a night of consuming much alcohol, he comes across the same boy sleeping near a waste container on the streets. Being a kind-hearted person, Sagar takes the boy home and names him Raja after his late son, but continues to drink. He attempts to nurture Raja as his own son and is heartbroken when a doctor declares that he is deaf-mute by birth. Meanwhile, Raja sees both Surendra Mohan and Ranjeet several times in the city and unsuccessfully tries to inform Sagar in sign language that they are his mother's murderers. Soon, Surendra Mohan and Ranjeet learn about this development, as well as that Mohan's dead body has been recovered from the sea by Inspector Ashok Gupta. In order to cover up their crime, they keep trying to kill Raja and are nearly successful one night when Sagar is heavily drunk. However, Sagar saves Raja at the last moment and decides to quit drinking after the incident.

Later, Sagar meets a wealthy young girl, Sapna, at shopping centres a couple of times and she believes Raja to be his son. Sapna grows close to Raja and gradually falls in love with Sagar, while she also happens to resemble Sagar's late wife, Sheela. She takes Sagar and Raja to her home where Raja sees a photograph of Sapna with her widowed father, Kailash Nath, and shockingly his mother, who turns out to be Sapna's estranged older sister. Soon, Sapna and Kailash Nath learn from Meena's acquaintance, Father Joseph Sebastian, that Raja is Meena's son and that Meena's whereabouts are unknown. Kailash Nath files a police complaint against Sagar alleging that he might have kidnapped Meena.

As a result, Sagar is arrested, tortured and imprisoned by Inspector Gupta for helping a child. During the investigation for Meena's whereabouts, the police, Sagar, Sapna, Kailash Nath and Father Sebastian visit Raja's house where there was a happy family. The police take a detection dog to find out clues and the dog smells the ground outside the house. They dig the ground and shockingly discover a piece of cloth, in which Meena's dead body was wrapped and buried there, anguishing Sapna and Kailash Nath. Inspector Gupta concludes that Sagar has killed Meena and Sapna fails to convince the police that Sagar is not the culprit. In an attempt to prove his innocence, Sagar escapes from police custody and resorts to a blacksmith, Lohar, to discover the truth about Surendra Mohan and Ranjeet. With Lohar's help, he sketches a portrait of Ranjeet to help Raja identify him as his mother's killer.

In the process, Sagar visits Surendra Mohan and threatens to expose his crime through Raja's testimony. Subsequently, Inspector Gupta seeks Surendra Mohan's consent in allowing Raja to act as a witness against Ranjeet, while he also has an evidence has Surendra Mohan's wife had an extramarital affair with his manager, Mohan. When questioned by Inspector Gupta, Surendra Mohan informs him that his wife has gone to Switzerland for some change after her guilt and grief for Mohan's death. However, things take a drastic turn when Surendra Mohan and Ranjeet kidnap both Sagar and Raja from Sapna's home in Kailash Nath's absence and take them to Sagar's home. While there, Surendra Mohan reveals that he has murdered his wife too along with Mohan after learning about her affair with him. Moreover, he tries to brainwash Sagar into committing suicide by hanging in his home and threatens to kill Raja if he refuses to do so. Although a reluctant Sagar agrees and nearly succeeds, Raja creates a commotion that allows him to be freed and kill Surendra Mohan by hanging him from the same noose tied for his own death. Later, a furious Sagar thrashes Ranjeet nearly to death in revenge of Meena's brutal murder and knocks him unconscious. Just then, Sapna arrives at the scene with Inspector Gupta and the police and is reunited with Sagar and Raja. As a result, a gravely injured Ranjeet is arrested for his crimes while Sagar is cleared from all charges by Inspector Gupta.

== Cast ==
- Govinda as Sagar
- Neelam Kothari as Sapna Nath
- Sujitha as Raja
- Raj Kiran as Inspector Ashok Gupta
- Anupam Kher as Surendra Mohan
- Babu Antony as Ranjit
- Johnny Lever as Lohar
- Gauri Shanker as Johnny Lever's wife
- Om Shivpuri as Kailash Nath (Sapna's father)
- Satyen Kappu as Father Joseph Sebastian
- Satish Kaul as Mohan (Surendra Mohan's manager)
- Aparajita as Meena (Raja's mother)
- Lawrence D'Souza as Special Appearance
- Rakesh Bedi as Restaurant Owner
- Vikas Anand as Doctor Saxena
- Jimmy Pardhan as Jimmy

== Awards ==
34th Filmfare Awards:

Won

- Best Art Direction – Liladhar S. Sawant
- Best Sound – J. P. Sehgal

== Soundtrack ==
Lyrics by Indeevar.

#	Song	Singer
1	"Aap Ko Agar Zaroorat Hai, Dil Mera Haazir Khidmat Hai"	Kishore Kumar, Asha Bhosle
2	"Zindagi Mahek Jaati Hai, Har Nazar Bahek Jaati Hai"	Lata Mangeshkar, K. J. Yesudas
3	"Main Pyar Ki Pujaran, Mujhe Pyar Chahiye"	Mohammed Aziz, Sapna Mukherjee
4	"Main To Hoon Sab Ka, Mera Na Koi"	Kirti Kumar
5	"Ghunghat Ke Pat Khol"	Kirti Kumar
