= Albela (2001 film) =

2001 film by Deepak Sareen

- Poster
- Directed by: Deepak Sareen
- Written by: Honey Irani; Javed Siddiqui
- Produced by: Kumar S. Taurani; Ramesh S. Taurani
- Starring: Jackie Shroff; Govinda; Aishwarya Rai; Namrata Shirodkar; Saeed Jaffrey
- Cinematography: Manmohan Singh
- Edited by: Keshav Naidu; Pramod Naidu
- Music by: Jatin–Lalit
- Production company: Tips Films Pvt. Ltd
- Release date: 20 April 2001
- Country: India
- Language: Hindi

Albela (transl. Unique) is an Indian Hindi-language romantic comedy film released on 20 April 2001. It was directed by Deepak Sareen and stars Jackie Shroff, Govinda, Aishwarya Rai and Namrata Shirodkar.

Upon release, the film received mixed reviews from critics and was declared an "average" at the box office by Box Office India.

== Plot ==
Tony (Govinda) is an easy-going and popular tour guide. One day a fortune teller tells him that a blue-eyed princess from overseas will enter his life and change it forever. She is the dream girl that he has been searching for.

On the way from Austria to an intended holiday in Singapore, Sonia (Aishwarya Rai) and her nanny (Maya Alagh) stop off in Mumbai. When their connecting flight is delayed, Sonia decides instead to travel to Malaga (which is implied to be near Goa), the birthplace of her mother, who died when Sonia was very young. Sonia has been brought up by her father (the Austrian Ambassador) (Saeed Jaffrey) since her mother mysteriously abandoned the family to return to Malaga. Although Sonia knows her father will be very angry with her – he hates India and Indians due to his wife leaving him – Sonia wants to see her mother's grave for the first time. She convinces her father to let her stay in Malaga for a few days to fulfill her wish.

Upon arrival in Malaga, Sonia meets Tony and hires him to show her the area and to help her find her mother's grave. As Sonia and Tony see the sights of Goa and find her mother's grave, Tony begins to fall in love with Sonia and it appears Sonia is very fond of him. Unbeknownst to Tony, his childhood friend, Neena (Namrata Shirodkar) is in love with him and she does not take kindly to him spending all his time with Sonia.

One day when Sonia is traveling with Tony, she sees a man in the distance. Flashbacks show that the man is Prem Arya (Jackie Shroff), an Indian journalist who Sonia met in Austria when he was interviewing her father. Prem and Sonia became friends, fell in love, and hoped to marry. When Sonia's father found out, he forbade them to marry because Prem is Indian, and although they are deeply in love, they agree to end their relation.

Returning to the present, Sonia is shocked to find Prem is in Malaga. When she sees that Prem has written an article about Tony and that they are good friends, she asks Tony to organize a lunch on the pretense of meeting the author of the article. Prem agrees to the meeting and is startled to see Sonia. When Tony goes to order lunch, Sonia reveals to Prem that she is still in love with him and is sorry about having to leave him to keep her father happy. Prem tells her that there is no point in having these feelings as there is nothing either of them can do about it and, overcome by emotion, he leaves. When Tony returns from ordering lunch, Sonia says she wants to leave too, resulting in a very confused Tony.

The next day, Sonia calls Prem and admits he still loves her and has not been able to stop thinking about her. They begin to spend time together and after returning from one outing with Prem, Sonia admits to her nanny that she still is madly in love with Prem and that he is a wonderful and kind person. Tony overhears this and believes Sonia is referring to her feelings for him. On another occasion, Tony and Neena join Prem and Sonia on their outing. It is obvious to both Prem and Sonia that Neena loves Tony, so Sonia attempts to tell Tony that Neena loves him. Tony mistakes her comments and, in combination with what he has already overheard, believes that Sonia is trying to tell him that she loves him.

As Sonia and Prem spend time together, Sonia realizes that her true happiness lies in being with Prem. Unfortunately, Sonia's father travels to Malaga to surprise her and discovers that Sonia has been seeing Prem again. He believes that she intentionally traveled to Malaga to see Prem and does not believe that it was a coincidence. He forbids Prem to see Sonia and orders Sonia to pack, intending to take her back to Austria straight away.

Sonia tells Tony that she will be returning to Austria and he is devastated. Sonia invites Tony to join her in Austria and Tony willingly accepts. Neena is extremely upset, but Tony thinks this is because he is leaving her alone in Malaga – he assures her that he will find a job for her once he is settled in Austria and continues happily packing for his journey.

Sonia makes one last trip to the cemetery and is met by a priest, who tells her the true reason for her mother's return to Malaga. When she gets to the airport, she is met by Tony, who tells her that he cannot go with her to Austria anymore. He has discovered a message left for him by Neena, revealing her feelings and wishing him happiness in his new life. He tells Sonia that he knows she loves him and although he loves her in return, he realizes that Neena relies on him and will not cope if he leaves. Achieving his dream of being with Sonia will be at the expense of Neena, and he is not prepared to do this.

Sonia tries to tell Tony that she does not love him, but he leaves quickly, not wanting a sad farewell. Sonia's father makes derogatory comments about Indians and about Tony not joining them, but Sonia defends Tony and tells her father of his sacrifice. After seeing this sacrifice, Sonia realizes that she cannot give up Prem just to keep her father happy and begs him to let them marry. Her father still refuses and makes further derogatory comments about Indians and her mother, and this is when Sonia reveals the truth – that her mother was diagnosed with a contagious disease, so she made the sacrifice to leave the two of them and die alone in India so that they would not fall ill. She gives her father letters written by her mother (but never sent) and he apologizes to Sonia and tells her to go to Prem.

Tony and Neena are happily sitting in a restaurant when he notices Sonia at another table with Prem. Tony believes Sonia has not left Malaga because she wants to be near to him (Tony). Tony comments that although she looks quite pale and sad, Sonia will eventually get over her feelings for him. At Sonia and Prem's table, Sonia suggests to Prem that they should thank Tony because it was he who brought them together, and she also wants to clarify with Tony that she never had feelings for him. Prem stops her and advises that some dreams are so beautiful that they should not be broken – that it is better for Tony to believe that he gave up a princess for an ordinary girl.

== Cast ==
- Jackie Shroff as Prem
- Govinda as Tony
- Aishwarya Rai as Sonia
- Namrata Shirodkar as Neena
- Sanjay Mishra as Gabru
- Saeed Jaffrey as Sonia's Father
- Maya Alagh as Nanny

== Production ==
The film was shot in Bangalore (interiors), Goa, Mauritius and Austria.

== Reception ==
Taran Adarsh from IndiaFM gave the film 1 out of 5, writing "On the whole, ALBELA has just one factor going in its favour; the fresh combination of Govinda and Aishwarya Rai which has helped the film take a good start, but the poor direction and a poorer script will mar its prospects after the initial craze declines. Its fall is inevitable!". Ziys Us Salam of The Hindu cited "Albela brings Govinda and Aishwarya together for the first time. While Govinda attempts to step beyond the ribald street entertainer with his portrayal of the suave English-speaking guide, Aishwarya tries to prove that she can hold her own in front of the master of comedy. In their own way, both of them succeed. While Jackie and Namrata are adequate in their relatively smaller roles, it is the music of the film which does not quite get you humming out of the hall. It may not shower the bounties of spring on the producers but it is not too bad a proposition for this summer of relatively meagre takings". Ronjita Das of Rediff wrote "The film is pleasantly enjoyable. Deepak Sareen (of Aaina fame) probably didn't think of making anything more than a family entertainer, which is exactly what this film is. Aishwarya, as usual, is a visual treat. The film is just another ramp for her to display her exquisite designer clothes. If only she paid more attention to her acting. Govinda is atrociously overweight and has a tendency to mouth his dialogues as if everyone in the theatre had lost their hearing. On the other hand, Jackie Shroff steals the show – no bulging bags under his eyes, and the actor looks good. Namrata Shirodkar is hardly present in the film. When she is, all she does is cry. So making out whether she can act or not is rather tough. The music, however, is the saving grace of the film".

== Soundtrack ==
The soundtrack was composed by Jatin–Lalit.Songs were popular

#	Title	Singer(s)	Lyrics	Length
1	"Hai Mera Dil Tu"	Babul Supriyo, Alka Yagnik	Sameer	03:21
2	"Dil Hamara Hua Hai Kisi Ka"	Hariharan, Alka Yagnik	Rani Malik	04:21
3	"Kaho To Zara"	Kumar Sanu, Alka Yagnik	Sameer	05:19
4	"Haiyaa Hoo Kya Masti"	Kumar Sanu, Udit Narayan, Alka Yagnik	Sameer	05:15
5	"Pyaar Ke Jadoo"	Udit Narayan, Alka Yagnik	Sameer	04:09
6	"Hato Tum Baju"	Sonu Nigam	Sameer	04:50
7	"Sarse Sarak Gayi"	Babul Supriyo, Alka Yagnik	Sameer	04:49
