= Yare Nee Abhimani =

- DVD cover
- Directed by: D. Rajendra Babu
- Screenplay by: D. Rajendra Babu
- Produced by: Lakshman Pramod Kumar
- Starring: Shiva Rajkumar; Ramya Krishna; Sangita; Srinath
- Cinematography: P. K. H. Das
- Edited by: Shashikumar
- Music by: Hamsalekha
- Production company: Sri Jwalamalini Devi Productions
- Release date: 10 January 2000
- Country: India
- Language: Kannada

Yare Nee Abhimani (transl. Who are you, my admirer?) is a 2000 Indian Kannada-language film, written and directed by D. Rajendra Babu and produced by Lakshman Pramod Kumar. The film stars Shiva Rajkumar, Ramya Krishna and Sangita (in her last Kannada film to date). The film is a remake of the 1993 Hindi film Aaina.

== Cast ==
- Shiva Rajkumar as Adithya
- Ramya Krishna as Prajna
- Sangita as Utthara
- Srinath as Prajna and Utthara's father
- Dwarakish as Gundlupete Gundanna
- Doddanna as Photographer
- Mandeep Roy
- R. G. Vijayasarathy
- Rekha Das
- M. S. Karanth
- Deepa Bhaskar (uncredited)

== Soundtrack ==
All the songs are composed and written by Hamsalekha.

No.	Song	Singers	Length (m:ss)
1	"Ramya Krishna"	Rajesh Krishnan, Chithra	05:06
2	"Mysore Seeme"	S. P. Balasubrahmanyam	05:12
3	"Shrungarada Kavyavo"	S. P. Balasubrahmanyam, Rathnamala Prakash	05:05
4	"Yaare Nee Abhimani"	Srinivas, Chithra	05:16
5	"Hello Usire"	Rajesh Krishnan, Chithra	05:04
6	"Vasa Vasa Srinivasa"	Rajesh Krishnan, Chithra	04:51
