= Nagara Varidhi Naduvil Njan =

Nagaravaridhi Naduvil Njan
- Film poster
- Directed by: Shibu Balan
- Written by: Sreenivasan
- Starring: Sreenivasan; Sangita; Manoj K Jayan; Lal
- Cinematography: Sameer Haq
- Edited by: Ranjan Abraham
- Music by: Govind Menon
- Production company: E4 Entertainment
- Release date: 2014
- Country: India
- Language: Malayalam

Nagaravaridhi Naduvil Njan (The Great Town and I am in the Middle) is a 2014 Malayalam film directed by Shibu Balan and written by Sreenivasan. It stars Sreenivasan, Sangita, Lal, Manoj K Jayan, Innocent and Bheeman Raghu in major roles. It marked Sangita's return to films after a 14-year sabbatical from acting.

== Plot ==
The film tells the story of Venu, whose dream is to get an MBBS admission for his daughter. To fulfil his dream, he decides to sell his property. But, the colony members try to disrupt his plans.

== Cast ==
- Sreenivasan as Venu
- Sangita
- Lal as Senan
- Manoj K Jayan as Suresh
- Innocent as Davis
- Vijayaraghavan
- Bheeman Raghu as Ittikorah
- Prem Kumar
- Sethu Lakshmi as Venu's mother
- Joy Mathew
- Meghna Vincent

== Reception ==
Asha Prakash for The Times of India rated the film two and a half stars out of five and commented: "... the climax is interesting and the film does have several messages ... Innocent, Vijayaraghavan and Bheeman Raghu play their parts convincingly and provide comic relief and the residential colony scenes remind you of the evergreen comedies of Malayalam. However, the subtlety of satire and the sharp wit in a Sreenivasan script is missing and the attempts at sarcasm are naive."

Paresh C. Palicha for Rediff gave a rating of two stars out of five and considered: ... "When the film suggests that a common man can be coerced into becoming a contract killer to fulfill the dreams of his children, our credibility is stretched too far. ... "Innocent and Vijayaragavan are used as staple comedians. This deepens our disappointment with the overall proceedings."

Sify.com film rated the film two stars from five and commented: " ... Nagaravaridhi Naduvil Njan has its heart at the right place, but the way it has been presented lets you down. The issues being narrated here are relevant but you will need solid patience to sit through this one and to appreciate it."
