= Sujitha =

Indian television actress

- Born: 12 July 1983 (age 43); Chennai, Tamil Nadu, India
- Occupations: Actress, voice artist
- Years active: 1983–present
- Spouse: Dhanush
- Children: 1
- Relatives: Surya Kiran (brother)

Sujitha (born 12 July 1983) is an Indian actress who works in Tamil, Telugu and Malayalam TV serials. She also acted in some Tamil, Telugu, Kannada and Malayalam films.

== Personal life ==
She was born to T. S. Mani and Radha in Nungambakkam, Chennai, Tamil Nadu. Her family is from Trivandrum, Kerala. She has a late elder brother, Surya Kiran and a younger sister, Sunitha.

She married ad film maker Dhanush and the couple settled in Chennai. The couple have a son named Dhanwin.

== Career ==
She started her acting during her infancy. She first appeared in the film, Abbhas, as the granddaughter of K. R. Vijaya when she was just 41 days old.

== Television ==
TV serials

| Year | Serial | Role | Channel | Language | Notes |
|---|---|---|---|---|---|
| 1998 | Oru Pennin Kathai | Rathna | Doordarshan | Tamil | Debut |
| 1999 | Ganga Yamuna Saraswati | Manju/Narmada | Raj TV | Tamil | |
| 2000 | Uravugal | | Vijay TV | Tamil | |
| 2000 | Kalisundam Raa | | Gemini TV | Telugu | |
| 2001 | Kalavari Kodalu | | Gemini TV | Telugu | |
| 2001 | Swantham Malootty | Malootty | Surya TV | Malayalam | Debut in lead role |
| 2001 | Swayamvaram | Sindu | | Malayalam | |
| 2001 | Venalkkalam | | Asianet | Malayalam | |
| 2002 | Idavazhiyile Poocha Mindapoocha | | Asianet | Malayalam | |
| 2004 | Soundarya | Soundarya | Gemini TV | Telugu | |
| 2005 | Kanavarukaaga | Sandhya | Sun TV | Tamil | |
| 2006 | Kaanaakkinaavu | Archana Sharath/Achu | Surya TV | Malayalam | |
| 2006 | Mythili | | Kalaignar TV | Tamil | |
| 2007 | Pookkalam | | Surya TV | Malayalam | |
| 2008 | Aadivaram Adavallaku Selavu Kavali | Shanthi | GeminiTV | Telugu | |
| 2008 | Devimahathmyam | Devi | Asianet | Malayalam | |
| 2008 | Maruthani | Meenatchi | Sun TV | Tamil | |
| 2009 | Sudigundalu | | Gemini TV | Telugu | |
| 2009 | Akka Thangai | Sandhya | Kalaignar TV | Tamil | |
| 2009 | Hasini Suhasini | | Vijay TV | Tamil | |
| 2009 | Karthavyam | Sujatha | Gemini TV | Telugu | |
| 2009–2011 | Maharani | Maha | Vijay TV | Tamil | |
| 2009–2011 | Sundarakanda | Sneha | Gemini TV | Telugu | |
| 2009–2012 | Vilakku Vacha Nerathula | Pavithira | Kalaignar TV | Tamil | |
| 2010 | Kalpana | | Maa TV | Telugu | |
| 2010 | Kalavari Kodalu | Kusuma | Gemini TV | Telugu | |
| 2010 | Sreemahabhagavatham | Devaki | Asianet | Malayalam | |
| 2010 | Srikrishna Leelalu | Subhadra | ETV | Telugu | |
| 2010–2012 | Harichandanam | Unnimaya | Asianet | Malayalam | |
| 2011 | Thiruvilayadal | Parvathi | Sun TV | Tamil | |
| 2012 | Brindavanam | | Mega TV | Tamil | |
| 2012 | Bhairavi Aavigalukku Priyamanaval | Bhairavi | Sun TV | Tamil | Replaced by Nithya Das |
| 2013 | Gangotri | Ganga | Gemini TV | Telugu | |
| 2012 | Edadugulu | Vani | Zee Telugu | Telugu | |
| 2013 | Indira | Indira | Mazhavil Manorama | Malayalam | Replaced by Gayatri Arun |
| 2014–2015 | Oru Kai Osai | Akhila | Zee Tamil | Tamil | |
| 2015 | Aadavari Matalaku Arthale Verule | Akshaya | Gemini TV | Telugu | |
| 2015 | Sangamam | Ancy | Surya TV | Malayalam | |
| 2016 | Snehasangamam | Ancy | Surya TV | Malayalam | |
| 2017 | Tulasi Dhalam | Gautami | Star Maa | Telugu | |
| 2017 | Kalisundam Raa | Tulasi | Gemini TV | Telugu | |
| 2018 | Kumarasambhavam | Dakshayini | Amrita TV | Malayalam | |
| 2018–2023 | Pandian Stores | Dhanalakshmi (Dhanam) | Star Vijay | Tamil | |
| 2019–2022 | Vadinamma | Seetha | Star Maa | Telugu | |
| 2020 | Mounaraagam | Seetha | Star Maa | Telugu | Special appearance |
| 2020 | Bharathi Kannamma | Dhanalakshmi (Dhanam) | Star Vijay | Tamil | Special appearance |
| 2021–2022 | Baakiyalakshmi | Dhanalakshmi (Dhanam) | Star Vijay | Tamil | Special appearance |
| 2021 | Thamizhum Saraswathiyum | Dhanalakshmi (Dhanam) | Star Vijay | Tamil | Special appearance |
| 2023–2024 | Geethanjali | Geetha | Gemini TV | Telugu | |
| 2024 | Meghasandesam | Shobha Chandra | Zee Telugu | Telugu | Special Appearance |
| 2024–2025 | Gowri | Karumariamman; Adv. Karpagambal; SP Ulaganayagi | Kalaignar TV | Tamil | Extended Cameo Appearances |
| 2025–2026 | Archana Chechi LL.B | Adv. Archana | Mazhavil Manorama | Malayalam | |
| 2025 | Chinnanchiru Kiliye | Lakshmi | Zee Tamil | Tamil | Special Appearance |
| 2025–2026 | Police Police | Inspector Arthana | JioHotstar | Tamil | Web series |

TV shows

| Program | Role | Channel | Language | Notes |
|---|---|---|---|---|
| Super Dancer | Judge | Amrita TV | Malayalam | |
| Veruthe Alla Bharya season 2 | Judge | Mazhavil Manorama | Malayalam | |
| Veruthe Alla Bharya season 3 | Judge | Mazhavil Manorama | Malayalam | Replaced by Reshmi Soman |
| Enga Veetu Mapillai | Judge | Colors Tamil | Tamil | |
| Odi Vilayadu Mummy | Host | Puthuyugam TV | Tamil | |
| Oru Varthai Oru Latcham | Contestant | Star Vijay | Tamil | |
| Mrs. Chinnathirai | Contestant | Star Vijay | Tamil | |
| Start Music Tamil | Participant | Star Vijay | Tamil | |
| Start Music Telugu | Participant | Star Maa | Telugu | |
| Namma Veetu Natchathiram | Participant | Kalaingar TV | Tamil | |
| Raju Vootla Party | Guest | Star Vijay | Tamil | |
| Cooku with Comali season 5 | Contestant | Star Vijay | Tamil | 1st runner-up |
| Cooku with Jatiratnalu season 1 | Contestant | Star Maa | Telugu | Winner |
| Samaiyal Express | Host | Zee Tamil | Tamil | Replaced For Seetha |

== Filmography ==
=== Actress ===
| Year | Title | Role | Language | Notes |
|---|---|---|---|---|
| 1983 | Abbhas | | Tamil | Child artist |
| 1983 | Mundhanai Mudichu | Vaathiyar's son | Tamil | Child artist |
| 1983 | Vaashi | | Malayalam | Child artist |
| 1984 | Piriyilla Naam | Young Sreedevi | Malayalam | Child artist |
| 1984 | Kathanayakudu (1984 film) | Mahalakshmi's son | Telugu | Child artist |
| 1985 | Pudhu Yugam | | Tamil | Child artist |
| 1986 | Ravana Brahma | | Telugu | Child artist |
| 1986 | Mandhira Punnagai | Suji | Tamil | Child artist |
| 1986 | Manakanakku | Murali | Tamil | Child artist |
| 1986 | Poovinu Puthiya Poonthennal | Benny/Kittu | Malayalam | Child artist |
| 1987 | Poovizhi Vasalile | Benny/Raja | Tamil | Child artist |
| 1987 | Kadhal Parisu | | Tamil | Child artist |
| 1987 | Pasivadi Pranam | Raja | Telugu | Child artist |
| 1987 | Muddu Bidda | | Telugu | Child artist |
| 1987 | Jeevan Jyothi | | Kannada | Child artist |
| 1987 | Manithan | Sujitha | Tamil | Child artist |
| 1987 | Anbulla Appa | | Tamil | Child artist |
| 1987 | Paadu Nilave | Young Balakrishnan | Tamil | Child artist |
| 1987 | Aapadbandhava | | Kannada | Child artist |
| 1987 | Chandamama Raave | | Telugu | Child artist |
| 1987 | Kaalathinte Sabhdam | | Malayalam | Child artist |
| 1987 | Vrutham | | Malayalam | Child artist |
| 1987 | Nirabhedhangal | | Malayalam | Child artist |
| 1987 | Ajantha | | Malayalam | Child artist |
| 1987 | Per Sollum Pillai | | Tamil | Child artist |
| 1988 | Muthukkal Moondru | | Tamil | Child artist |
| 1988 | Raktabhishekam | Raaji | Telugu | Child artist |
| 1988 | Puthiya Vaanam | | Tamil | Child artist |
| 1988 | Hatya | Raja | Hindi | Child artist |
| 1988 | Paadatha Thenikkal | | Tamil | Child artist |
| 1988 | Poovukkul Boogambam | | Tamil | Child artist |
| 1988 | Thenpadi Seemayile | | Tamil | Child artist |
| 1989 | Vettaiyaadu Vilaiyaadu | | Tamil | Child artist |
| 1989 | Manchi Kutumbam | | Telugu | Child artist |
| 1989 | Vintha Dongalu | | Telugu | Child artist |
| 1990 | Doctor Bhavani | | Telugu | Child artist |
| 1990 | Judgement | | Telugu | Child artist |
| 1991 | Talli Tandrulu | Rani | Telugu | Child artist |
| 1991 | Azhagan | Baby | Tamil | Child artist |
| 1991 | Aadi Veli | | Tamil | Child artist |
| 1991 | Thangamana Thangachi | Young Lakshmi | Tamil | Child artist |
| 1991 | Chavettupada | | Malayalam | Child artist |
| 1992 | Roja | Chinna ponnu | Tamil | Child artist |
| 1992 | Thevar Magan | | Tamil | Child artist |
| 1993 | Naan Pesa Ninaipathellam | Kaveri | Tamil | Child artist |
| 1994 | Paasamalargal | Niroopa | Tamil | Child artist |
| 1994 | Rickshaw Rudraiah | | Telugu | Child artist |
| 1995 | Sindoora Rekha | | Malayalam | Child artist |
| 1995 | Bombay | Special appearance | Tamil | Child artist |
| 1997 | Iruvar | Tamizhselvan's daughter | Tamil | Child artist |
| 1997 | Circus Sattipandu | | Telugu | Child artist |
| 1997 | Aaro Pranam | Vinu | Telugu | Child artist |
| 1998 | Summer in Bethlehem | Ravishankar's cousin sister | Malayalam | Child artist |
| 1999 | House Full | | Tamil | Child artist |
| 1999 | Vaalee | Sheela | Tamil | Child artist |
| 1999 | Hello | Gayathri | Tamil | Child artist |
| 1999 | Samarasimha Reddy | | Telugu | Child artist |
| 2000 | Azad | Kaveri | Telugu | Child artist |
| 2000 | Ival Draupadi | Anitha | Malayalam | Child artist |
| 2000 | Ingane Oru Nilapakshi | Uma | Malayalam | Child artist |
| 2000 | Kaatrukkenna Veli | Manimekalai | Tamil | Child artist |
| 2000 | Sundara Kanda | Roja | Kannada | Child artist |
| 2002 | Vamshakkobba | Sumayya | Kannada | |
| 2002 | Andipatti Arasampatti | | Tamil | Delayed release |
| 2003 | Melvilasam Sariyanu | Anjali | Malayalam | |
| 2003 | Choonda | Ganga | Malayalam | |
| 2003 | Palnati Brahmanayudu | Kalyani | Telugu | |
| 2004 | Kottaram Vaidyan | Shivapriya | Malayalam | |
| 2004 | Wanted | Anu | Malayalam | Credited as Suchitra |
| 2004 | Quotation | Anjali | Malayalam | |
| 2004 | Malsaram | Laila | Malayalam | |
| 2005 | Jathi | Kavitha | Tamil | |
| 2005 | Prayatnam | Sujitha | Telugu | |
| 2005 | Jai Chiranjeeva | Satyanaraya Murthy's sister | Telugu | |
| 2006 | Sasanam | | Tamil | |
| 2006 | Samanyudu | Lakshmi | Telugu | |
| 2006 | Brahmastram | Tulasi | Telugu | |
| 2008 | Galimpu | | Telugu | |
| 2008 | Gorintaku | Sarvarayudu's wife | Telugu | |
| 2009 | Patham Adhyayam | Ashwathy | Malayalam | |
| 2009 | Aayirathil Oruvan | Saraswathi | Malayalam | |
| 2009 | Mestri | Jhansi | Telugu | |
| 2009 | Dairy | | Telugu | |
| 2011 | Pallikoodam | | Tamil | |
| 2012 | Thaandavam | Abi | Tamil | |
| 2012 | Gowri Kalyana Vaibhogame | Gowri | Telugu | |
| 2014 | Amma Ammamma | Jyothi | Tamil | |
| 2014 | Iniya Ulavaaga | | Tamil | |
| 2014 | Kottampatti Thodakka Palli | | Tamil | |
| 2018 | Diya / Kanam | Doctor | Tamil / Telugu | |
| 2021 | Ainthu Unarvugal | | Tamil | |

=== Dubbing artist ===
| Year | Movie | Actress | Notes |
|---|---|---|---|
| 2021 | Master | Malavika Mohanan | For Malayalam dubbed version |

== Awards ==
| Year | Award | Category | Serial | Role | Result | Notes |
|---|---|---|---|---|---|---|
| 1987 | Nandi Award | Best Child Actress | Chandamama Raave | Chandamama | Won | |
| 2011 | Asianet Television Awards 2011 | Special Jury Award | Harichandanam | Unnimaya | Won | |
| 2018 | Vijay TV Awards | Best Actress- Female | Pandian Stores | Dhanalakshmi | Won | |
| 2019 | Vijay TV Awards | Anbirkiniya Anniyar | Pandian Stores | Dhanalakshmi | Won | |
