= Jab Pyaar Kisise Hota Hai =

1998 film by Deepak Sareen

- Poster
- Directed by: Deepak Sareen
- Written by: Honey Irani
- Produced by: Kumar S. Taurani; Ramesh S. Taurani
- Starring: Salman Khan; Twinkle Khanna; Anupam Kher; Saeed Jaffrey; Aditya Narayan; Namrata Shirodkar
- Cinematography: Manmohan Singh
- Edited by: Renu Saluja
- Music by: Jatin–Lalit
- Production company: Tips Industries
- Release date: 22 May 1998
- Running time: 170 minutes
- Country: India
- Language: Hindi
- Budget: ₹6.50 crore
- Box office: ₹21.95 crore

Jab Pyaar Kisise Hota Hai (transl. When love happens with someone) is a 1998 Indian Hindi-language romantic-drama film directed by Deepak Sareen and written by Honey Irani. The film stars Salman Khan as a womaniser and Twinkle Khanna as his first true love. Anupam Kher, Johnny Lever, Mushtaq Khan, Himani Shivpuri, Farida Jalal, and Saeed Jaffrey play supporting roles. Aditya Narayan plays Khan's character's previously unknown son.

== Plot ==
The film follows Suraj Dhanrajgir, a carefree and flirtatious young man who lives a luxurious lifestyle filled with casual relationships. His grandfather, Anand Dhanrajgir, disapproves of Suraj’s irresponsible behaviour and hopes he will eventually reform. To keep watch over him, Anand employs Mahesh Pithani, Suraj’s close friend and wingman.

Suraj’s life changes when he returns home at his grandfather’s request and falls deeply in love with Komal, a principled and traditional woman. While attempting to introduce himself over the phone, Komal’s aunt mistakes him for Suraj Dhanoa, Komal’s childhood friend. Although Komal gradually gets to know Suraj,

Determined to win Komal’s trust, Suraj gives up smoking, drinking, flirting, and his other vices. The sudden lifestyle change causes him to suffer a relapse, leading to his hospitalisation. Komal initially believes he has failed to keep his promise, but after learning that he genuinely abandoned his habits for her sake, she accepts his sincerity.

Just as Suraj begins earning Komal’s love and trust, his past resurfaces in the form of a young boy named Kabir, who arrives claiming to be his son from a previous relationship. Suraj is initially shocked and unwilling to believe him, but learns that Kabir’s mother, Pooja, has died and that the child has nobody else to care for him. Suraj places Kabir in an orphanage, but Kabir escapes. Though reluctant and overwhelmed by the responsibilities of fatherhood, Suraj eventually accepts Kabir as his son. However, he conceals the truth from Komal through lies and deception, fearing it will destroy their relationship. Komal, meanwhile, believes Kabir’s presence will ruin their future together despite Suraj’s assurances.

On the day of their wedding, Suraj decides to confess everything to Komal. Shocked and heartbroken, Komal and her family feel betrayed by his dishonesty and demand that he choose between her and Kabir. Torn between his love for Komal and his growing attachment to Kabir, Suraj desperately tries to prove his sincerity and sense of responsibility. When he ultimately chooses to stand by Kabir, Komal recognises the genuine bond that has formed between father and son. She realises that Suraj has transformed from a careless playboy into a responsible and devoted man willing to embrace his duties as a father.

Moved by his love and dedication, Komal forgives Suraj and accepts both him and Kabir into her life. The film concludes with Suraj, Komal, and Kabir united as a happy family, symbolising love, acceptance, and the power of personal change. During the wedding celebrations, Mahesh plays a prank on Suraj by sending another child who falsely claims to be the son from one of Suraj’s former relationships.

== Cast ==
- Salman Khan as Sooraj Dhanrajgir
- Twinkle Khanna as Komal Sinha
- Namrata Shirodkar as Pooja Bachchan, Kabir's mother and Suraj's ex-girlfriend
- Johnny Lever as Mahesh Pithani
- Anupam Kher as Anand Dhanrajgir, Sooraj's grandfather and Kabir's great-grandfather
- Mushtaq Khan as Singh
- Aditya Narayan as Kabir Dhanrajgir
- Saeed Jaffery as Yashpal Sinha, Komal's father
- Farida Jalal as Gayatri Sinha, Komal's mother
- Harish Patel as Roopchand Sinha, Komal's Uncle
- Vivek Vaswani as Suraj Dhanoa
- Himani Shivpuri as Ragini Sinha, Komal's aunt

== Production ==
The film marked the acting debut of Namrata Shirodkar after appearing in a brief role as a child actress in Shirdi Ke Sai Baba (1977).

== Soundtrack ==
Jab Pyaar Kisise Hota Hai

Soundtrack album by Jatin–Lalit
- Released: 11 February 1998
- Genre: Feature film soundtrack
- Length: 39:36
- Label: Tips Music
- Producer: Jatin–Lalit

Jatin–Lalit chronology
Khoobsurat (1998)	Jab Pyaar Kisise Hota Hai (1998)	Ghulam (1998)

Jab Pyaar Kisise Hota Hai's music was composed by Jatin–Lalit with lyrics by Anand Bakshi, most of the songs were sung by Lata Mangeshkar, Kumar Sanu, Udit Narayan, Sonu Nigam and Alka Yagnik.

The film's soundtrack album sold 2 million units in India, making it the ninth top-selling Bollywood music album of 1998.

#	Title	Singer(s)	Length
1	"O Jaana Na Jaana"	Lata Mangeshkar, Kumar Sanu	04:25
2	"Pehli Pehli Baar Jab"	Kumar Sanu	04:32
3	"Madhosh Dil Ki Dhadkan"	Lata Mangeshkar, Kumar Sanu	05:26
4	"Chal Pyar Karegi"	Alka Yagnik & Sonu Nigam	06:17
5	"Dil Mein Basake"	Alka Yagnik & Kumar Sanu	05:02
6	"Is Dil Mein Kya Hai"	Lata Mangeshkar, Udit Narayan	04:41
7	"Ek Dil Tha Paas Mere"	Kumar Sanu & Alka Yagnik	05:08
8	"O Jaana Yeh Maana (Part 2)"	Lata Mangeshkar, Kumar Sanu	01:11

== Reception ==
A review in India Today noted that the story could potentially have been a "four-hankie tearjerker" but Sareen failed "to deliver". It opined that the "typically over-confident Bollywood brat" Aditya Narayan was the film's biggest problem and it was Khan who "[kept] the film going" quite opposite to Khanna's "awkward hysterics". Concluding the review, it called for her "to take both acting and grooming lessons from mom". Writing for Rediff.com, Dhara Kothari opined that the "storyline [had] been stretched a good deal more than it should have" been. He found the editing weak but noted that Narayan showed "promise". On Khanna's acting, he commented that she exhibited "her limitations" which possibly could be ascribed to her role. He concluded his review by saying that the film "is entertaining enough to draw audiences". Screen magazine wrote it "tackles an unusual subject in an interesting and sensitive manner".

Khanna told in an interview that scriptwise it was her best film. Aditya Narayan was nominated for the Zee Cine Award for Best Actor in a Supporting Role – Male for his performance in the film.

The film did quite well at the box office, the film grossed ₹200 million in India and $475,000 overseas for a worldwide total of ₹219.6 million ($5.322 million), against a budget of ₹65 million. It was the eleventh highest-grossing film of 1998.
