= Jathi (film) =

- Directed by: R. Vijayaragava
- Written by: R. Vijayaragava; Srivanker
- Produced by: P. Chithirai Selvan; K. S. Radha
- Starring: Sathya; Sujitha
- Cinematography: P. Chithirai Selvan
- Edited by: S. Ashok Mehta
- Music by: Agni Kalaivani (songs); Sathya (score)
- Production company: Seven Horse Films
- Release date: March 18, 2005
- Running time: 100 minutes
- Country: India
- Language: Tamil

Jathi (transl. Jathi), also spelled as Jadhi, is a 2005 Indian Tamil language romantic drama film directed by R. Vijayaragava. The film stars newcomer Sathya and Sujitha, with Nizhalgal Ravi, Seetha, Rajeev, Ambika, Abhinayashree, Ajay Rathnam, Azhagu and Rajini Nivetha playing supporting roles. The film, produced by P. Chithirai Selvan and K. S. Radha, was released on 18 March 2005.

== Plot ==
In Chennai, Shiva (Sathya), a jobless BE graduate, lives with his father Deena Dayalan (Nizhalgal Ravi) who is an assistant commissioner of police and his mother (Ambika). While Kavitha (Sujitha) is a college student living in a ladies hostel. One day, the scooter of Kavitha halts in the street and Shiva repairs it, but Kavitha leaves the place without thanking him. An infuriated Shiva follows Kavitha in his scooter and scolds her for not being thankful. In reply to this, Kavitha tells him that "thanks" is just a word and nobody should expect something after helping a person. Another day, at the house of Priya (Abhinayashree), a groom's family comes to see her. As Priya's parents were about to agree for the engagement, Shiva who is also the best friend of Priya's brother Vijay stops it. Kavitha who is Priya's friend reacts with anger for spoiling Priya's life. Later, Shiva meets Kavitha in a shop and clarifies everything: Priya, Vijay and their parents are all orphans and Shiva wanted them to live together as long as possible.

Thereafter, Shiva and Kavitha fall in love with each other. One night, Kavitha goes to see her mother (Seetha), a prostitute, in her house in the colony. A police squad headed by Deena Dayalan raid the colony and they arrest many women for alleged prostitution including the innocent Kavitha. Kavitha is then released but Shiva has been deeply shaken by the news and Deena Dayalan tells his son to forget her. A depressed Shiva cannot forget her. After the sudden death of her mother, Kavitha meets Shiva. She tells him everything and Shiva finally understands that she is innocent. On his side, Shiva convinces his parents to support their love and they accept for the marriage. Meanwhile, a saddened Kavitha arrives at the bus station to leave the city. Shiva then finds her at the bus station and he happily announces that they are going to marry with the blessings of his parents. Kavitha falls unconscious (she drank poison before) and she says to him "I love you" before dying on his lap. The film ends with a distraught Shiva dying of heart attack on the spot.

== Cast ==
- Sathya as Shiva
- Sujitha as Kavitha
- Nizhalgal Ravi as Deena Dayalan, Shiva's father
- Seetha as Kavitha's mother
- Rajeev as Nedumaran
- Ambika as Shiva's mother
- Abhinayashree as Priya
- Ajay Rathnam as Police inspector
- Azhagu as Priya's father
- Rajini Nivetha as Priya's mother
- Sarath as Bharath
- Raja
- Guru
- Ajay
- Sanjith
- Gopi as Gopi
- Vizag Ravi
- Buvan
- Jai
- Lekhasri in a special appearance

== Production ==
R. Vijayaragava made his directorial debut with Jathi under the banner of Seven Horse films. Sathya, who was graduated from the acting school run by dance choreographer Kala, was selected to play the male lead while Sujitha was chosen to play his love interest. Ambika, Seetha, Nizhalgal Ravi, Azhagu, Rajeev and Ajay Rathnam were also added to the cast. The film had music by debutant Agni Kalaivani, art direction by T. Rajan, editing by S. Ashok Mehta and stunt choreography by Super Subbarayan. Ireland and Rajasthan were the locations chosen to picturise two of the songs. Speaking of the film, the film director said, "The hero's mother has a passion for music, so the title is relevant. It's a love story, where a small mistake snowballs into a major misunderstanding".

== Soundtrack ==
Jathi

Soundtrack album by Agni Kalaivani
- Released: 17 December 2004
- Recorded: 2004
- Genre: Feature film soundtrack
- Length: 41:56
- Label: Kosmik
- Producer: Agni Kalaivani

The soundtrack was composed by Agni Kalaivani. The soundtrack, released on 17 December 2004, features 11 tracks.

Tracklist
No.	Title	Singer(s)	Length
1.	"Gods Gift Time"	Gandhi	3:35
2.	"Kanavillaiye Thediparkiren"	Harish Raghavendra	4:36
3.	"Saidapettai Rangarattinam"	Anuradha Sriram	4:54
4.	"Deivangal Thottradho"	Gandhi	1:37
5.	"Kadale Kadale"	Prabhakar	5:26
6.	"Shiyo Shiyo"	Tippu	3:59
7.	"Vennila Kangalil"	Srinivas, Mahathi	5:04
8.	"Title Music"		1:32
9.	"Nenjai Thuranthadu Yar"	G. Gayathri Devi	4:03
10.	"Vinnai Thodadha"	Ranjith, G. Gayathri Devi	3:57
11.	"Ada Oththakada"	Tippu, Rajalakshmi	3:13
Total length:			41:56
