= Snehikkan Oru Pennu =

- Directed by: N. Sukumaran Nair
- Written by: Thoppil Bhasi
- Screenplay by: Thoppil Bhasi
- Starring: Thikkurissy Sukumaran Nair; Sankaradi; Sreelatha Namboothiri; Vasanthi
- Cinematography: M. C. Sekhar
- Edited by: M. S. Mani
- Music by: G. Devarajan
- Production company: Suvarna Arts
- Distributed by: Suvarna Arts
- Release date: 8 December 1978
- Country: India
- Language: Malayalam

Snehikkan Oru Pennu is a 1978 Indian Malayalam-language film, directed by N. Sukumaran Nair. The film stars Thikkurissy Sukumaran Nair, Sankaradi, Sreelatha Namboothiri and Vasanthi. The film has musical score by G. Devarajan. The film marked the acting debut of Sangita Madhavan Nair as a child artiste.

== Cast ==
- Thikkurissy Sukumaran Nair
- Sankaradi
- Sreelatha Namboothiri
- Vasanthi
- Bahadoor
- M. G. Soman
- Meena
- Sangita Madhavan Nair

== Soundtrack ==
The music was composed by G. Devarajan and the lyrics were written by Yusufali Kechery.

No.	Song	Singers	Lyrics	Length (m:ss)
1	"Aararo Thechu Minukkiya"	P. Madhuri	Yusufali Kechery	
2	"Makaram Vannatharinjille"	P. Madhuri	Yusufali Kechery	
3	"Ormayundo Maankidaave" (F)	P. Madhuri	Yusufali Kechery	
4	"Ormayundo Maankidaave" (M)	P. Jayachandran	Yusufali Kechery	
5	"Poochakku Poonilavu Paalu Pole"	K. J. Yesudas	Yusufali Kechery	
6	"Snehikkaanoru Pennundenkil"	K. J. Yesudas	Yusufali Kechery	
