= Babu Antony =

Indian actor

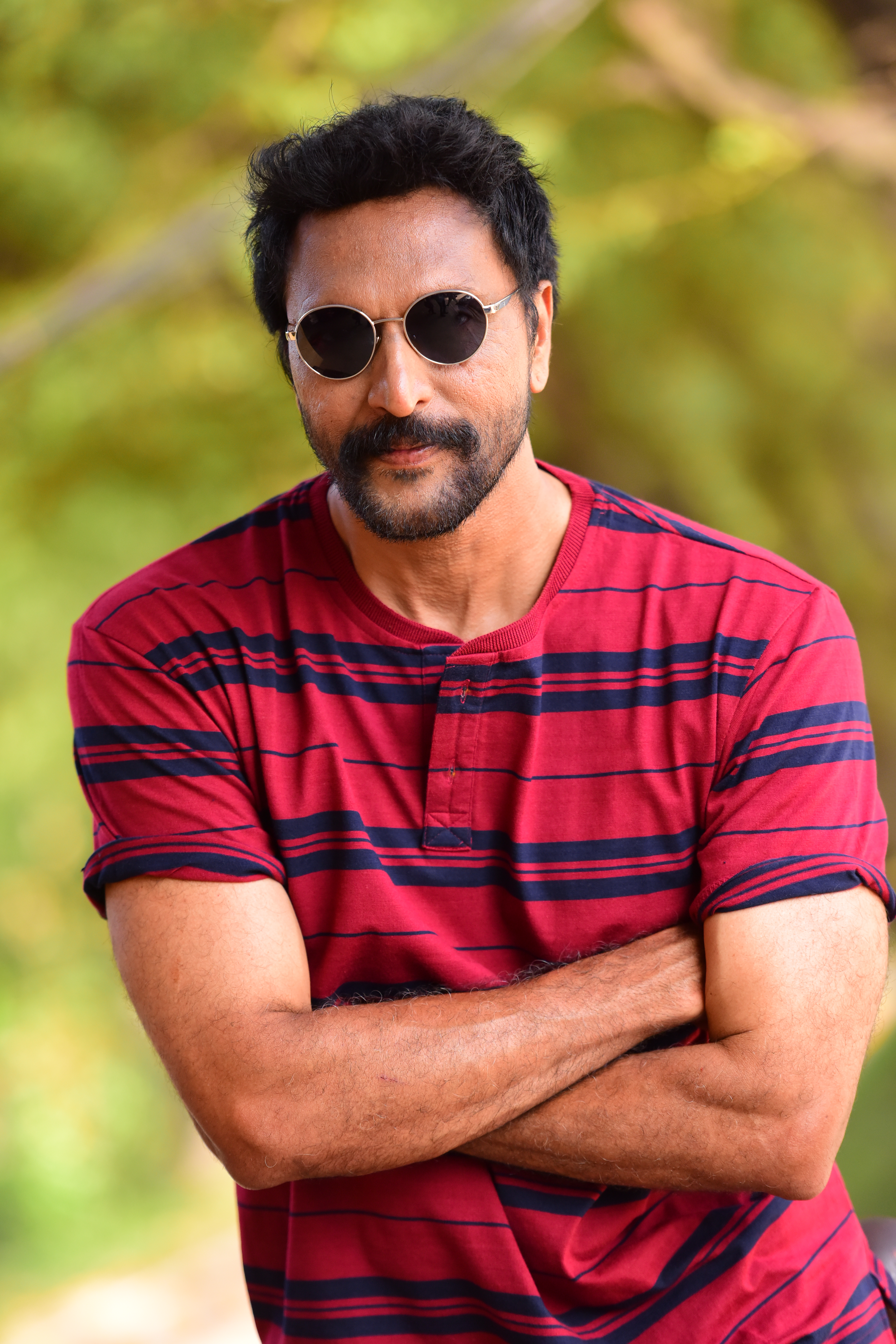
- Babu Antony in the film Karinkunnam 6'S
- Born: 22 February; Ponkunnam, Kerala, India
- Education: SIBM Pune (MBA)
- Occupation: Actor
- Years active: 1985–present
- Spouse: Evgeniya Antony
- Children: 2
- Relatives: Antony Thekkek (brother)
- Website: babuantony.com

Babu Antony (born 22 February) is an Indian-American actor and martial artist, who works primarily in Malayalam cinema. He has also acted in several Tamil, Telugu, Kannada, Sinhalese, Hindi and English films. He started his career doing antagonistic roles and progressed to supporting and leading roles as well. Babu owns a mixed martial art academy in Houston.

He made his debut in Bharathan's Chilampu (1986). His career highlights include Vaishali (1988), Aparahnam (1991) and Uppukandam Brothers (1993).

== Career ==
Early in his career, he started making appearances in roles like Chilambu, Mizhineerppoovukal (1986) in Malayalam. He made a mark through Fazil's 1986 thriller Poovinu Puthiya Poonthennal. The film was remade into Tamil, Telugu, Kannada and Hindi. Babu reprised his role in all five versions. He made his debut by playing an antagonist in Bharathan's Chilambu (1987).

In 1987, he appeared for its debut in Tamil cinema with Sathyaraj in Poovizhi Vasalile and then Makkal En Pakkam. Later with Kamal Haasan's Vrutham (1987) in Malayalam and Per Sollum Pillai in Tamil. With Nizhalgal Ravi, he acted in a horror film, Veendum Lisa which were all commercial successes. He also played with Chiranjeevi in Pasivadi Pranam and Jebu Donga which was later a hit at the box office. He started his career as a villain and later on featured in leading roles with the image of an angry young man.

His debut film in Kannada was Shanti Kranti (1991). His movies like Aparahnam (1991), Gandhari (1993), Rajadhani (1994), Bharanakoodam (1994), Chantha (1995), Special Squad (1995) and Indian Military Intelligence (1995) helped him to build a large audience and fan following for him. Apart from these, he has worked as many different characters such as an ex-terrorist role in Aparahnam, a king's role in Vaishali (1988), an impecunious man in Sayahnam (2000). Uppukandam Brothers (1993) gave a breakthrough for Babu's career in starring roles.

He made his debut in Hindi cine-industry with the movie Hatya in 1988. He is also in Telugu films including Lorry Driver (1990), Sathruvu (1991) and Nippu Ravva (1993). His debut movies in English Made in USA (2005) and Leader (2009) in Sinhala. His other Tamil hits were Anjali (1990), Surieyan (1992), Airport (1993), Attahasam (2004), Vinnaithaandi Varuvaayaa (2010), Kanchana (2011), Aadhi-Bhagavan (2013), Kaaviya Thalaivan (2014), Kaaka Muttai (2015), Adanga Maru (2018), Ponniyin Selvan (2022), Ponniyin Selvan: II (2023) and Leo (2023).

== Personal life ==
He is married to Evgeniya Antony, who is a Russian American. The couple has two sons, Arthur Antony and Alex Antony. He trains his sons in martial arts and Arthur got his 1st Dan Black Belt in MMA.

== Filmography ==
=== Malayalam films ===
Key
| † | Denotes films that have not yet been released |

| Year | Title | Role | Notes |
|---|---|---|---|
| 1986 | Chilambu | | Debut film |
| 1986 | Mizhineerppoovukal | Richard's friend | |
| 1986 | Poovinu Puthiya Poonthennal | Renji | |
| 1986 | Pranamam | Ajith | |
| 1987 | Jaithra Yaathra | | |
| 1987 | Vrutham | Freddy | |
| 1987 | Veendum Lisa | John Fernandes | |
| 1988 | Vaisali | Lomapadhan | |
| 1988 | Moonnam Mura | Antony | |
| 1989 | New Year | Robert | |
| 1989 | Douthyam | Gang Leader | |
| 1989 | Antharjanam | Vishnu Namboothiri | |
| 1989 | The News | Victor George | |
| 1989 | Carnivel | James | |
| 1989 | Jagratha | Babu | |
| 1990 | Kottayam Kunjachan | Psycho Jimmy | |
| 1990 | Randam Varavu | Customs Officer Stephen | |
| 1990 | Vyooham | | |
| 1991 | Koodikazhcha | Williams | |
| 1991 | Aparaahnam | Nandakumar | |
| 1991 | Kuttapathram | Vicky | |
| 1991 | Chakravarthy | Edwin | |
| 1992 | Kauravar | Hamsa | |
| 1992 | Kavacham | | |
| 1992 | Kasarkode Khaderbai | Kasim Bhai | |
| 1992 | Ezhara Ponnana | Charlie | |
| 1992 | Naadody | Jackson | |
| 1993 | Gandhari | Vishnu | |
| 1993 | Uppukandam Brothers | Uppukandam Sevichan | |
| 1993 | Mafia | Chandra Gowda | |
| 1994 | Kadal | Bapooty | |
| 1994 | Napoleon | Abu Salim | |
| 1994 | Rajadhani | Abbas Amanulla Khan | |
| 1994 | Kambolam | Tharakandam Daniel / Dany | |
| 1994 | Dadha | Bharathan | |
| 1994 | Bharanakoodam | Dany | |
| 1995 | Street | Guruji | |
| 1995 | Boxer | Jimmy Cherian | |
| 1995 | Rajakeeyam | Durga Dathan | |
| 1995 | Chantha | Sulthan | |
| 1995 | Special Squad | Siby Matthew | |
| 1995 | Arabia | Akbar Ali | |
| 1995 | Indian Military Intelligence | Imran Khan | |
| 1997 | Hitler Brothers | Narendran | |
| 1998 | Gloria Fernandes from USA | Fernandes | |
| 1999 | Jananaayakan | Rajmohan | |
| 1999 | Devadasi | | |
| 1999 | Captain | Ranger Haridas | |
| 2000 | Shayanam | | |
| 2001 | Sravu | Bawa | |
| 2001 | Uthaman | Pulimuttathu Sunny Thomas | |
| 2001 | Unnathangalil | Thug | Cameo appearance |
| 2002 | Thandavam | Sufi | |
| 2004 | Shambu | | |
| 2004 | Vajram | Paulson Williams | |
| 2004 | Black | Govind Chengappa IPS | |
| 2004 | Nothing but Life | Omar | |
| 2006 | Highway Police | Mammad | |
| 2008 | Twenty:20 | Vikram Bhai | |
| 2008 | Shambhu | Adisheshan | |
| 2009 | Thirunakkara Perumal | Job | |
| 2010 | Thathwamasi | Parashurama | |
| 2010 | Yugapurushan | Ayyankali | |
| 2010 | Sufi Paranja Katha | Sufi | |
| 2010 | 9 KK Road | Devdas Adiyodi | |
| 2010 | Kanyakumari Express | Ranjan Philip | |
| 2010 | Again Kasargod Khader Bhai | Kasargod Kasim Bhai | |
| 2011 | Christian Brothers | Captain Rasheed Rahman | |
| 2011 | Uppukandam Brothers: Back in Action | Uppukandam Sevichan | |
| 2012 | Cobra | Isaac | |
| 2012 | Grandmaster | Victor Rosetti | |
| 2013 | Buddy | Chandran Singh | |
| 2013 | Idukki Gold | Antony | |
| 2014 | Villali Veeran | | |
| 2014 | Homely Meals | Himself | |
| 2016 | Moonam Naal Njayarazhcha | | |
| 2016 | Karinkunnam 6's | Douglas | |
| 2017 | Ezra | Rabbi David Benyamin | |
| 2017 | Zacharia Pothen Jeevichirippundu | Chami | |
| 2018 | Kayamkulam Kochunni | Thangal | |
| 2019 | Mikhael | John | Cameo appearance |
| 2022 | The Great Escape | Bob Christo | |
| 2022 | Headmaster | | |
| 2022 | Neepa | | |
| 2023 | Madanolsavam | Madanan Manjakkaaran | |
| 2023 | RDX: Robert Dony Xavier | Antony Aashan | |
| 2024 | DNA | DCP Raja Mohammed | Cameo appearance |
| 2024 | Bad Boyz | Vettukadu Belson | |
| 2025 | Oru Jaathi Jathakam | Ramesh Babu | |
| 2025 | Bazooka | John Caesar | Cameo appearance |
| 2025 | Maranamass | DYSP Ajay Ramachandran | |
| 2025 | Odum Kuthira Chaadum Kuthira | | |
| 2025 | Adinaasam Vellapokkam | Police offficer | |

=== Tamil films ===
Key
| † | Denotes films that have not yet been released |

| Year | Title | Role | Notes |
|---|---|---|---|
| 1987 | Poovizhi Vasalile | Ranjith | |
| 1987 | Makkal En Pakkam | Kidnapper | |
| 1987 | Per Sollum Pillai | | |
| 1990 | Anjali | Dharma | |
| 1991 | Nattukku Oru Nallavan | Bob | |
| 1992 | Surieyan | Micky | |
| 1992 | Thirumathi Palanisamy | | |
| 1993 | I Love India | | |
| 1993 | Airport | | |
| 1996 | Nethaji | Baba | |
| 1997 | Pagaivan | Dharman's brother | |
| 2004 | Campus | Sathya's brother | |
| 2004 | Attahasam | Manthiram | |
| 2010 | Vinnaithaandi Varuvaayaa | Joseph (Jessie's father) | |
| 2011 | Rowthiram | Priya's father | |
| 2011 | Kanchana | Akbar Bhai | |
| 2013 | Aadhi Bhagavan | Sam | |
| 2014 | Kaaka Muttai | Shiva Chidambaram | |
| 2014 | Kaaviya Thalaivan | Zamindar | |
| 2018 | Adanga Maru | Sanjay | |
| 2022 | Ponniyin Selvan: I | Rashtrakuta King Khottiga | |
| 2023 | Ponniyin Selvan: II | Rashrakuta King Khottiga | |
| 2023 | Leo | Antony's henchman | |
| 2026 | Sardar 2 | Agent "Tiger" Michael Poiyamozhi | |

=== Telugu films ===
Key
| † | Denotes films that have not yet been released |

| Year | Title | Role | Notes |
|---|---|---|---|
| 1987 | Pasivadi Pranam | Ranjith | |
| 1987 | Jebu Donga | Mike | |
| 1988 | Trinetrudu | | |
| 1989 | Adavilo Abhimanyudu | Max | |
| 1990 | Magaadu | | |
| 1990 | Lorry Driver | Seenu | |
| 1991 | Sathruvu | Jorge | |
| 1991 | Chaitanya | Thug | |
| 1991 | Shanti Kranti | Bob | |
| 1993 | Nippu Ravva | Dasu | |
| 2008 | Ekaloveyudu | Bhakta | credited as Bob Antony |
| 2010 | Ye Maaya Chesave | Joseph (Jessie's father) | Cameo appearance |
| 2016 | Krishnashtami | | |

=== Hindi films ===
Key
| † | Denotes films that have not yet been released |

| Year | Title | Role | Notes |
|---|---|---|---|
| 1988 | Hatya | Ranjit | |
| 1990 | Jawani Ki Jalan | | |
| 1991 | Shanti Kranti | Hindi | |
| 2001 | Nayak: The Real Hero | Sniper | Guest appearance |
| 2012 | Ekk Deewana Tha | Advocate Joseph (Jessie's father) | |

=== Kannada films ===
Key
| † | Denotes films that have not yet been released |

| Year | Title | Role | Notes |
|---|---|---|---|
| 1991 | Shanti Kranti | Bob | |
| 1992 | Ravivarma | | |
| 1997 | Yuvasakthi | | |
| 2012 | Kalpana | Akbar Bhai | |

=== Other language films ===
Key
| † | Denotes films that have not yet been released |

| Year | Title | Role | Language | Notes |
|---|---|---|---|---|
| 2005 | Made in USA | Omar | English | |
| 2009 | Leader | Raghuwaran / Kimbulawala Soththi Siran | Sinhala | |
| 2019 | Bullets Blades and Blood | | English | |
