= Vallal =

- Theatrical release poster
- Directed by: Raj Kapoor
- Written by: Raj Kapoor
- Produced by: Ramanathan
- Starring: Sathyaraj; Meena; Sangita; Roja
- Cinematography: Ramji
- Edited by: B. Lenin; V. T. Vijayan
- Music by: Deva
- Production company: Raaj Films International
- Release date: 19 April 1997
- Running time: 147 minutes
- Country: India
- Language: Tamil

Vallal (transl. Generous) is a 1997 Indian Tamil-language drama film written and directed by Raj Kapoor. The film stars Sathyaraj, Meena, Sangita and Roja. It was released on 19 April 1997. The film was remade in Telugu in 1998 as Raayudu.

== Plot ==
Durairasu loves Madhavi but she doesn't reciprocate his love and marries her uncle. Once Virumandi and Madhavi's husband get into a fight. Unfortunately Madhavi & her husband passes away. So Durairasu does not marry anyone & devotes his life for Madhavi's daughter Chella kili. Because of this issue there was a break in the family, Thulasi who is Virumandi's wife and Durairasu's Sister and he were separated. This made Virumandi very angry so he always wants to avenge. Durairasu save a girl Annam from the sea, who doesn't want to divulge her past. As time passes, Annam gets closer into the family and Kamakshi Durairasu's mother asks Durairasu to marry Annam. And this creates a problem for Chella kili as she loses Durairasu's attention, she comes out of her family and stays in Virumandi's house. Later Thulasi explains the whole story to her and lets her go to her father. In the end Annam, Durairasu, Chella kili, Kamakshi, Chithapu live together happily.

== Cast ==
- Sathyaraj as Durairasu
- Meena as Annam
- Roja as Madhavi (Extended Cameo)
- Sangita as Chella Kili
- Manorama as Kamakshi
- Goundamani as Thangarasu
- Senthil as Azhagan
- Lakshmi as Thulasi
- Manivannan as Virumandi
- M N Nambiar as Dharmarasu (Guest Appearance)
- Ponnambalam as Ponnambalam
- Sanjay Bhargav as Maruthu
- Sabitha Anand as Selvi (Guest Appearance)
- Nizhalgal Ravi as Kalingarayan (Guest Appearance)

== Production ==
Shobana Vignesh was initially selected to play a role in the film alongside fellow actresses Meena and Roja. The first promotional campaign however featured Sangita's name instead of Shobana, prompting Meena to attempt to leave the project, citing potential reduced prominence owing to a third lead actress. The director Raj Kapoor subsequently asked her to stay on, assuring importance. After the film's release, Meena criticised Kapoor for his false assurances. The film marked the debut of cinematographer Ramji who earlier assisted P. C. Sreeram.

== Soundtrack ==
Soundtrack was composed by Deva and lyrics were written by Vaali.

| Song | Singers | Length |
|---|---|---|
| "Aagayam Rendaaga" | Chorus | 00:30 |
| "Aasai Vecha" | S. P. Balasubrahmanyam | 04:56 |
| "Kadharu Sattaiya" | K. S. Chithra, S. P. Balasubrahmanyam | 04:47 |
| "Kiliye Pachakiliye" | Mano | 00:41 |
| "Kulebagavali" | Pushpavanam Kuppusamy, Anuradha Sriram | 05:19 |
| "Poove Poove" | Mano | 00:44 |
| "Puliyampatti" | Manorama | 01:38 |
| "Samba Samba" | Deva, S. P. Balasubrahmanyam, Anuradha Sriram | 05:13 |
| "Thala Thalakira" | Mano, Harini | 04:21 |
| "Thoppul Enna" | Mano, Anuradha Sriram | 05:03 |
| "Vethala Vethala" | Febi Mani | 01:12 |
| "Yetti Uthachathamma" | Nagore E. M. Hanifa | 03:29 |

== Release and reception ==
When the film was struggling with its release, it was Vijayakanth who helped the film in getting its release. R. P. R. of Kalki praised the performance of Sangeetha who equally performed with Sathyaraj while also praising Deva's music and Meena's performance but felt the film's lengthy first half could have been reduced to avoid lagging. K. N. Vijiyan of New Straits Times wrote, "Though the story may be nothing new, in Raj Kapoor's hands, the movie proves praiseworthy". The film did well at the box-office.
