= Kalyana Vaibhogam =

- Title card
- Directed by: N. Rathnam
- Screenplay by: N. Rathnam
- Produced by: K.S.K. Sankara Subramaniam; K.S.K. Arumugam; K.S.K. Karthikeyan; K.S.K. Kumaran
- Starring: Ramki; Khushbu; Sangita
- Cinematography: B. S. Nandhalal
- Edited by: Rajarajan–Kiton
- Music by: Deva
- Production company: Gomathi Shankar Films
- Release date: 5 September 1997
- Running time: 145 minutes
- Country: India
- Language: Tamil

Kalyana Vaibhogam (transl. Marriage celebration) is a 1997 Indian Tamil-language romance film directed by N. Rathnam, who had previously directed the film Chellakannu (1995). The film stars Ramki, Khushbu and Sangita, with Vadivelu, R. Sundarrajan, V. K. Ramasamy, Vennira Aadai Moorthy, Vijay Krishnaraj and Haja Shareef playing supporting roles. It was released on 5 September 1997. The film was a remake of the Hindi film Aaina (1993).

== Plot ==
Ramya and Shanthi are step-sisters. Ramya is arrogant while Shanthi is soft-spoken and sensitive. Sakthi is a writer and becomes popular by writing short stories in Tamil weekly magazines. Shanthi is Sakthi's avid fan, sends him letters every week anonymously, and she is in love with him. Sakthi really likes her letters and he decides to meet her, eager to confess his love.

Sakthi thinks that the anonymous fan is Ramya. Later, Sakthi and Ramya fall in love. By luck, Ramya becomes a model, and thereafter her popularity grows rapidly. Sakthi and Ramya decide to get married whereas the heartbroken Shanthi remained silent. The day of the wedding, Ramya runs away with dreams of being a cinema actress and Ramya asks him to wait for him. Feeling betrayed, Sakthi cannot accept it and he finally marries Shanthi. They live happily until Ramya comes back. What transpires later forms the crux of the story.

== Cast ==
- Ramki as Sakthi
- Khushbu as Ramya
- Sangita as Shanthi
- Vadivelu as Jacky
- R. Sundarrajan as Ganesan
- V. K. Ramasamy as Shanthi's grandfather
- Vennira Aadai Moorthy as Ramu
- Vijay Krishnaraj as Rajasekhar
- Haja Shareef
- Thiagarajan
- Kavitha as Kavitha
- Baby Srividya
- Baby Sowmya
- Baby Sridevi

== Soundtrack ==
The music was composed by Deva.

Song	Singer(s)	Lyrics	Duration
"Vizhioda Aadiye Azhaga"	Mano, K. S. Chithra	Palani Bharathi	4:24
"Roja Poovile"	Mano, Swarnalatha	Navendan	5:01
"Hollywood Chance"	Malgudi Subha	'Nellai' Arulmani	5:00
"Thaada Budala"	S. Janaki, Chorus	Ravi Bharathi	4:35
"Kanang Kuruviku"	S. P. Balasubrahmanyam, Swarnalatha	Pulamaipithan	4:50

== Reception ==
Ji of Kalki praised director for taking the story in a straight line without wandering here and there while praising the performances of Khushbu, Sangita and humour and concluded saying if it had been handled a little shorter without sagging, it would have been an enjoyable film. Two years after release, the producers were given a ₹5 lakh subsidy by the then Tamil Nadu Chief Minister M. Karunanidhi along with ten other films.
