= Sangita Madhavan Nair =

Indian actress

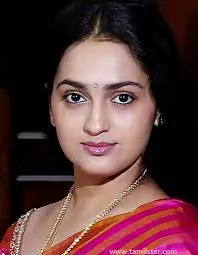
- Born: 25 July 1976 (age 50); Kottakkal, Malappuram, Kerala, India
- Occupation: Actress
- Years active: 1978–2000; 2014, 2023–present
- Spouse: S. Saravanan (m. 2000)
- Children: 1
- Parents: Madhavan Nair; Padma

Sangita Madhavan Nair is an Indian actress, who has worked in Tamil, Malayalam, Kannada and Telugu cinemas.

== Career ==
She started her career as a child artiste in the Malayalam movie Snehikkan Oru Pennu, released in 1978. Her debut film as a child artist in Tamil was En Rathathin Rathame (1989), which is the remake of Hindi movie Mr. India. The first film where she acted as a heroine was Ellame En Rasathan in 1995.

She is also well known for her role with actor Vijay's breakthrough film Poove Unakkaga (1996).

Subsequently, she starred in notable Tamil movies such as Kaalam Maari Pochu (1996), Alexander (1996), Vallal (1997), Pongalo Pongal (1997), Kalyana Vaibhogam (1997) and Ethirum Pudhirum (1999).

For her role in Malayalam satire film Chinthavishtayaya Shyamala (1998), which was written and directed by Sreenivasan, she won the Kerala State Film Award for Best Actress.

She portrayed impactful characters such as Aniyan Bava Chetan Bava (1995), Manthrikumaran (1998), Pallavur Devanarayanan (1999), Saphalyam (1999), Vazhunnor (1999) and Crime File (1999).

In Kannada, she is known for the movies Yaare Neenu Cheluve (1998) and Yare Nee Abhimani (2000).

She made her comeback after 14 years in Nagara Varidhi Naduvil Njan (2014) with Sreenivasan. Sangita has made a comeback to the silver screen with a strong character named Devi in Chaaver (2023).

After 25 years, Sangita returns to Tamil cinema with Bharath’s Kaalidas 2.

== Personal life ==
She was born as the youngest among four children, to the late Madhavan Nair from Kottakkal, Malappuram and mother, Padma from Kuzhalmannam, Palakkad, settled in Chennai. Her father migrated to Chennai for fruit business and the family settled there. She had her primary education from Sri Gujarati Vid Matriculation School, Chennai. She has two sisters, Mallika and Charu and a brother, Nitheesh.

She married cinematographer S. Saravanan in 2000 and retired from acting after marriage. The couple have a daughter Saai Thejaswathy born in 2002.

== Filmography ==
Year	Title	Role	Language	Notes
1978	Snehikkan Oru Pennu		Malayalam	
1983	Manju		Malayalam	
1986	Vartha		Malayalam	
1986	Ennennum Kannettante		Malayalam	
1987	Neeyallengil Njan	Syamala	Malayalam	
1989	En Rathathin Rathame		Tamil	
1991	Idhaya Vaasal	Uma	Tamil	
1991	Shanti Kranti	Orphan	Kannada	
1991	Shanti Kranti	Orphan	Telugu	
1991	Nattukku Oru Nallavan	Orphan	Tamil	
1991	Shanti Kranti	Orphan	Hindi	
1992	Naangal	Gayathri	Tamil	
1992	Samundi	Lakshmi	Tamil	
1992	Nani		Telugu	
1992	Naadody	Sindhu	Malayalam	
1993	Arthana	Anu	Malayalam	
1993	Thalattu	Sangita	Tamil	
1993	Captain Magal	Anjali	Tamil	
1994	Mahanadhi	Adult Kaveri	Tamil	Uncredited
1994	Ravanan	Uma	Tamil	
1994	Sarigamapadani	Sangita	Tamil	
1995	Simhavalan Menon	Urmila	Malayalam	
1995	Ellame En Rasathan	Raani	Tamil	
1995	Pullakuttikaran	Ammu	Tamil	
1995	Swapnam		Malayalam	
1995	Seethanam	Dhanalakshmi	Tamil	
1995	Aniyan Bava Chetan Bava	Malu	Malayalam	
1996	Amman Kovil Vaasalile	Poongothai	Tamil	
1996	Poove Unakkaga	Priyadarshini (Nirmala Mary)	Tamil	
1996	Kaalam Maari Pochu	Indra	Tamil	
1996	Vetri Vinayagar	Asirikai	Tamil	
1996	Namma Ooru Raasa	Rasaathi	Tamil	
1996	Alexander	Priya	Tamil	
1997	Vallal	Chella Kili	Tamil	
1997	Ganga Gowri	Gowri	Tamil	
1997	Adrasakkai Adrasakkai	Sangita	Tamil	
1997	Pongalo Pongal	Chitra	Tamil	
1997	Punniyavathi		Tamil	Unreleased
1997	Kalyana Vaibhogam	Shanthi	Tamil	
1998	Kattathoru Penpoovu	Kasthuri	Malayalam	
1998	Rathna	Chinthamani	Tamil	
1998	Chinthavishtayaya Shyamala	Shyamala	Malayalam	Kerala State Film Award for Best Actress; Cinema Express Award for Best Actress - Malayalam
1998	Manthrikumaran	Aswathy	Malayalam	
1998	Yaare Neenu Cheluve	Kamali	Kannada	
1998	Kumbakonam Gopalu	Sangeetha	Tamil	
1999	Samarasimha Reddy	Sangeetha	Telugu	
1999	Ethirum Pudhirum	Selvi	Tamil	
1999	Poomaname Vaa	Seetha	Tamil	
1999	Pallavur Devanarayanan	Vasundhara	Malayalam	
1999	Vazhunnor	Rabeka	Malayalam	
1999	Crime File	Amala	Malayalam	
1999	Saaphalyam	Sumithra	Malayalam	
1999	Jayam	Durga	Tamil	
2000	Yare Nee Abhimani	Utthara	Kannada	
2000	Kann Thirandhu Paaramma	Gayatri, Amman	Tamil	
2000	Kanal Kireedam	Mary	Malayalam	
2014	Nagara Varidhi Naduvil Njan	Sunitha	Malayalam	
2023	Chaaver	Devi	Malayalam	
2024	Parakramam	Savithri	Malayalam	
2024	Anand Sreebala	Sreebala	Malayalam	
2025	United Kingdom of Kerala	Annakutty	Malayalam	
2025	Hridayapoorvam	Devika	Malayalam	
2025	Haal	Asif's mother	Malayalam	
2026	Kaalidas 2	Roopa	Tamil	
