= Indian Military Intelligence =

- Directed by: T. S. Suresh Babu
- Written by: Dennis Joseph
- Screenplay by: Dennis Joseph
- Produced by: K.G Nair
- Starring: K. B. Ganesh Kumar, Babu Antony, Murali
- Release date: 24 December 1995
- Country: India
- Language: Malayalam

Indian Military Intelligence is a 1995 Indian Malayalam-language film, directed by T. S. Suresh Babu, starring Babu Antony, Murali and K. B. Ganesh Kumar.

== Cast ==
- K. B. Ganesh Kumar as ACP Shivaprasad IPS
- Murali as Captain Anthony Mathew
- Babu Antony as Imran Khan
- Srividya as Shivaprasad's mother
- Chippy as Sreedevi Varma
- Jose Prakash as Vijayan, Shivaprasad's grandfather
- Kuchan as Thankappan/George Spielberg
- Thikkurissy Sukumaran Nair as Valiya Thamburan
- Sukumaran as Cmde Raja Raja Varma
- Kundara Johny as Captain Sharma/Akbar
- Kuthiravattam Pappu as Aroodam Anandan
- P. C. George as Mohammed Sarkar
- Manu Varma as Jayakumar
- Prathapachandran as Comm. George Mathew
- Bheeman Raghu as Alex Ambalakkadan
- M. G. Soman as Ravi Varma
- Narayanankutty as Chandra Varma
- Poojappura Ravi as Mohana Varma
- K.P.A.C. Sunny as Shekhara Varmma
- Manjula Vijayakumar as Gracy
- Usharani as Mappasu Mariyamma
- Ratheesh as Auto decoratives proprietor
- Mohan Jose as Police officer
- Mohan Raj as Telephone operator
- Jayaram as Cameo Appearance in a song
- K. Madhu as himself
- Annie as Cameo Appearance in a song
- Kavitha Thambi as Prabha
- Biju Pappan
