= Shanti Kranti =

1991 Indian film by V. Ravichandran

- VCD cover of the Kannada version
- Directed by: V. Ravichandran
- Written by: V. Ravichandran; Hamsalekha (Kannada dialogues)
- Produced by: V. Ravichandran; N. Veeraswamy
- Starring: V. Ravichandran; Nagarjuna; Rajinikanth; Juhi Chawla; Ramesh Aravind; Khushbu; Anant Nag
- Cinematography: R. Madhusudhan
- Edited by: K. Balu
- Music by: Hamsalekha
- Production company: Eshwari Productions
- Release date: 19 September 1991
- Running time: 142 minutes
- Country: India
- Languages: Kannada; Telugu; Hindi
- Budget: ₹10 crores
- Box office: est. ₹8 crore

Shanti Kranti (/ʃɑːnθi krɑːnθi/ transl. Peace and Revolution) is a 1991 Indian action crime film written, directed and produced by V. Ravichandran. The film was simultaneously made in Kannada, Telugu, Hindi and Tamil languages, with the Tamil version titled Nattukku Oru Nallavan.

Ravichandran played the lead role in the original Kannada version, while Nagarjuna starred in the Telugu version, and Rajinikanth did so in Tamil and Hindi. The film's ensemble cast includes Juhi Chawla, Ramesh Aravind, Khushbu, Anant Nag, Babu Antony, Y. Vijaya and Baby Sangita. Chawla, Anant Nag, and Khushbu appeared in all four versions of the film. Ravichandran additionally portrayed Ramesh Aravind's role in the Telugu, Tamil, and Hindi versions.

The Telugu and Kannada versions of the film were released on 19 September 1991, followed by the release of the Tamil and Hindi versions on 2 October 1991. Despite its ambitious multilingual production and the inclusion of prominent actors, Shanti Kranti failed commercially in all languages.

== Plot ==
The film follows Inspector Subhash, who uncovers the sinister operations of a man named Daddy, who outwardly runs an ashram for children but is secretly involved in organ trafficking, particularly exploiting the children under his care. Subhash teams up with his friend, Inspector Bharath, to bring Daddy to justice.

Subhash's girlfriend Jyoti, who works at the ashram, aids in the investigation but is ultimately captured and killed by Daddy. Driven by grief and anger, Subhash enlists the help of the ashram's children to dismantle Daddy's operations. In the climactic confrontation, Subhash avenges Jyoti's death by defeating Daddy and putting an end to his criminal empire.

== Cast ==
Actor (Kannada)	Actor (Telugu)	Actor (Hindi)	Role
V. Ravichandran	Nagarjuna	Rajinikanth	Inspector Subhash
Juhi Chawla			Jyothi
Ramesh Aravind	V. Ravichandran	V. Ravichandran	Inspector Bharath
Anant Nag			Daddy
Khushbu			Rekha
Srinath		Alok Nath	Commissioner of Police
Doddanna	Satyanarayana	Satyendra Kapoor	Subhash's father
Annapurna		Aruna Irani	Subash's mother
Thyagaraju			I. G.
Charuhasan			Politician
Babu Antony			Bob
Y. Vijaya			Swathi
Baby Sangita			Orphan
Manik Irani			Daddy's henchman
Jack Gaud			Daddy's henchman

Kannada

- Master Prakash
- Rekha Das
- Master Sunil Raoh as young Subhash (uncredited)
- Baby Anu Prabhakar as young Jyothi (uncredited)

Telugu

- Srinath as Commissioner Shiva Kumar
- P. J. Sarma as Home Minister
- Sakshi Ranga Rao as Sastry
- Ahuti Prasad
- Master Amith

Hindi

- Om Shivpuri as Politician

== Production ==
Shanti Kranti was announced by V. Ravichandran as one of the most expensive projects of his career. He decided to direct the film in four languages—Kannada, Telugu, Tamil, and Hindi. The Tamil version was titled Naattukku Oru Nallavan. Rajinikanth was cast in the lead role for the Tamil and Hindi versions, while Nagarjuna was chosen for the Telugu version, and Ravichandran himself played the lead in the Kannada version. Bullet Prakash, who went on to become a famous comedian in Kannada cinema, made his acting debut as child artist with the Kannada version of this film.

The film was launched on 14 November 1988, coinciding with the birth anniversary of Jawaharlal Nehru, at Kanteerava Studios. The launch event was attended by journalists from various languages, who were shown Ravichandran's previous films Premaloka (1987) and Ranadheera (1988) before engaging in discussions with the director.

The film faced several production challenges. During the early stages of shooting, Ravichandran became concerned about the direction of the film. After 10 days of shooting, he felt that the story was not progressing as expected and doubted whether the project would succeed. Despite these reservations, Ravichandran continued with the film, motivated by the encouragement of his father, Veeraswamy, who was producing the film. In a conversation with his father, Ravichandran expressed his intention to quit, citing production difficulties. However, his father advised him against giving up, reminding him of the commitments made to the actors, including Rajinikanth and Nagarjuna, and the film's importance as a prestige project for Eswari Productions. His father urged him to finish the film, as backing out would reflect poorly on the production company.

The production process was further complicated by challenges such as securing call sheets from the stars and coordinating their schedules. Filming took place at a time when digital cameras were not available, so the production relied entirely on film reels, which limited the number of takes and required careful planning. Additionally, a strike in the Kannada film industry disrupted the production, making it even more difficult.

To realise his vision for the film, Ravichandran took the unconventional step of borrowing a 50-acre plot of empty land to shoot the climax. In addition, large sets were constructed to recreate M. G. Road in Bangalore, with special effects involving explosions and separate teams assigned to cater to the needs of each language version. Multiple cars, catering services, and crew members were organised for the different versions of the film.

Although the film was officially launched in 1988, production took nearly two years to complete. Despite his early doubts, Ravichandran finished Shanti Kranti, which was released in 1991. Ravichandran struggled to secure approval for an increase in ticket prices, which could have helped cover the film's substantial budget.

== Soundtrack ==
Hamsalekha composed the music for the film. The song "Vachaadu Yamaraaja" in the Telugu version contains the lyric "Hello Shiva Mama" alluding to Nagarjuna's previous film Siva (1989).

Kannada track listing
No.	Title	Singer(s)	Length
1.	"Swathantra Baanali"	S. P. Balasubrahmanyam, S. Janaki	4:44
2.	"Madhyarathrili"	S. P. Balasubrahmanyam, S. Janaki, Mano & chorus	8:30
3.	"Gaaliyo Gaaliyo"	S. Janaki, S. P. Balasubrahmanyam	5:14
4.	"Huttodyaake Saayodyaake"	S. Janaki	4:37
5.	"Iddare Iddare"	S. P. Balasubrahmanyam	5:09
6.	"One Two Three"	K. S. Chitra, S. P. Balasubrahmanyam	7:37
7.	"Aane Mele"	S. P. Balasubrahmanyam, S. Janaki	4:49
8.	"Anatha Bhanduve"	S. P. Balasubrahmanyam, S. Janaki	1:57
9.	"Bandano Yamaraya"	S. Janaki, S. P. Balasubrahmanyam	0:56
Total length:			43:35

Telugu track listing
No.	Title	Lyrics	Singer(s)	Length
1.	"Swathanthra Bhaarathamaa"	Veturi	S. P. Balasubrahmanyam, S. Janaki	4:44
2.	"Ardha Raathrilo"	Veturi	S. P. Balasubrahmanyam, Mano, S. Janaki	8:30
3.	"Gaali Go Gaali Go"	Veturi	S. P. Balasubrahmanyam, S. Janaki	5:14
4.	"Puttedhi Nijam"	Veturi	S. P. Balasubrahmanyam, S. Janaki	6:36
5.	"Evvaru Neesari"	Veturi	S. P. Balasubrahmanyam, S. Janaki	4:52
6.	"One Two Three"	Veturi	S. P. Balasubrahmanyam, K. S. Chithra	7:37
7.	"Enugoche Yeh Ooroche"	Veturi	S. P. Balasubrahmanyam, S. Janaki	4:49
8.	"Anaadha Bandhuve"	Veturi	S. P. Balasubrahmanyam, S. Janaki	1:57
9.	"Vachaadu Yamaraaja"	Sirivennela Sitarama Satry	S. P. Balasubrahmanyam	0:56
Total length:				43:35

Hindi track listing
No.	Title	Lyrics	Singer(s)	Length
1.	"Ja Ae Ga"	Indeevar	Alka Yagnik	4:41
2.	"One Two Three"	Indeevar	Anuradha Paudwal, S. P. Balasubrahmanyam	7:32
3.	"Ude Uhi Uncha"	Indeevar	Suresh Wadkar, Alka Yagnik	4:45
4.	"Tu Hi Mera"	Indeevar	Alka Yagnik, S. P. Balasubrahmanyam	1:22
5.	"Sajna O O"	Indeevar	Alka Yagnik, S. P. Balasubrahmanyam	4:49
6.	"Purvaee Purvaee"	Indeevar	Alka Yagnik, S. P. Balasubrahmanyam	5:15
7.	"Aadhi Night Mein"	Indeevar	Alka Yagnik, S. P. Balasubrahmanyam	8:24
8.	"Jo Dare Woh"	Indeevar	S. P. Balasubrahmanyam	5:10

== Reception ==
Deccan Herald wrote, "It was a visual spectacle no doubt, but the narrative lost sight of its subject---the organ transplant mafia". The film became a failure in all four languages. Its failure put Ravichandran in financial distress "forcing him to rely on remakes of hit Tamil and Telugu films" which resurrected his career. Ravichandran later estimated that the project caused a loss of approximately ₹10 crore during the 1989–90 period. Despite the film's failure, he won the Karnataka State Film Award (Special Jury Award) for Technology.

== Bibliography ==
- Ramachandran, Naman (2014) [2012]. Rajinikanth: The Definitive Biography. Penguin Books. ISBN 978-81-8475-796-5.
