= Deepak Sareen =

Indian director

Deepak Sareen is a Bollywood film director and assistant director. His first film as director was Ranbhoomi and last film as director was Albela.

== Filmography ==
=== As assistant director ===
- Deewaar (1975)
- Kabhi Kabhi (1976)
- Doosra Aadmi (1977)
- Silsila (1981)
- Mashaal (1984)
- Faasle (1985)

=== As director ===
- Ranbhoomi (1991)
- Aaina (1993)
- Gaddaar (1995)
- Jab Pyaar Kisise Hota Hai (1998)
- Albela (2001)
