= Special Squad (film) =

- Directed by: Krishnadas
- Written by: Kaloor Dennis
- Starring: Babu Antony; Charmila
- Cinematography: J. Willams
- Edited by: K. Sankunni
- Music by: Mohan Sithara
- Production companies: P&P Productions
- Distributed by: P&P Productions
- Release date: 1 September 1995
- Country: India
- Language: Malayalam

Special Squad is a 1995 Indian Malayalam-language action thriller film directed by Krishnadas and written by Kaloor Dennis. The film stars Babu Antony and Charmila in the lead roles. The soundtrack and musical score was composed by Mohan Sithara, while the cinematography and editing were handled by J. Willams and K. Sankunni.

== Plot ==
Sibi Mathew is appointed a customs officer in a tough place where he clashes with Fernandez and his sons for engaging in smuggling activities. Fernandez's son Freddy fights with Sibi and is killed, where Sibi get arrested and sentenced to life imprisonment after many false witnesses testify against him.

Fernandez's sons Bony and Martin chase Sibi's wife Shirley and kill her. Enraged by Shirley's death, Sibi escapes from prison and enters Vasudevan Nair's house where Vasudevan confesses that the files they received from the raid were handed back to Fernandez, which had become vital in the case against Sibi.

Sibi kills Martin and captures Freddy, who faked his death as per Fernandez's plan to kill a news leaker from their group and placed his dead body. After confessing, Freddy runs into Fernandez's hideout, where Sibi arrives and kills Fernandez, thus avenging Shirley's death.

== Cast ==
- Babu Antony as Sibi Mathew
- Charmila as Shirley
- Ramu as Bony
- Mala Aravindan as Kochaugusty
- Kundara Johny as Freddy
- Baburaj as Chandrappan
- Rajan P. Dev as Fernandez
- Chithra as Alice
- Captain Raju as Customs Collector Rajan Varghese
- Mahesh as Martin
- N. F. Varghese as Hameed
- Zainuddin as Murugan
- Geetha Vijayan as Rekha Cheriyan
- M. S. Thripunithura as Vasudevan Nair (Dubbing Hari)
- Vijayaraghavan as Noufal
- Vijayakumar as Simon
- Jose Pellissery as Adv. Shivadasa Menon
- Bindu Panicker as Sabiya
- Mafia Sasi as Gunda
- Silk Smitha as Madhumathi
- Nikhil as College student
- Benny as College student

== Soundtrack ==
The music was composed by Mohan Sithara and the lyrics were written by Mudavanmugal Vasantha Kumari.

No.	Song	Singers	Lyrics	Length (m:ss)
1	"Ente Kannil Nokku"	Malgudi Subha	Mudavanmugal Vasantha Kumari	
2	"Manjaniyum"	S. Janaki	Mudavanmugal Vasantha Kumari	
3	"Muthundo Ponnundo"	K. J. Yesudas	Mudavanmugal Vasantha Kumari	
