= Nattukku Oru Nallavan =

- Theatrical release poster
- Directed by: V. Ravichandran
- Written by: V. Ravichandran
- Produced by: V. Ravichandran
- Starring: Rajinikanth; Juhi Chawla
- Cinematography: Madhusudhan
- Edited by: K. Balu
- Music by: Hamsalekha
- Production company: Eswari Productions
- Release date: 2 October 1991
- Country: India
- Language: Tamil

Natukku Oru Nallavan (transl. A good man for the country) is a 1991 Indian Tamil-language crime action film directed by V. Ravichandran. The film stars Rajinikanth, Juhi Chawla, Ravichandran, Anant Nag, and Khushbu in major roles. It was simultaneously made in Hindi, Kannada and Telugu under the title Shanti Kranti, featuring slightly different casts. Hamsalekha composed the music for all versions.

Despite the release of a Telugu version, the film was later dubbed into Telugu under the title Police Bullet. It was a failure in all the languages produced.

== Plot ==
The storyline of Nattukku Oru Nallavan centres around an orphanage that secretly operates as a front for an illegal organ trafficking ring, masterminded by a ruthless criminal named Daddy. When Jyothi, a courageous young woman, discovers the horrifying truth behind the orphanage, she is brutally murdered to keep the secret hidden. Subhash, her lover and an honest police officer, is devastated by her death and sets out to bring those responsible to justice, leading to a confrontation with the criminal underworld.

== Cast ==
- Rajinikanth as Inspector Subhash
- Juhi Chawla as Jyothi
- V. Ravichandran as Inspector Bharath
- Anant Nag as Daddy
- Khushbu as Rekha
- Jaishankar as Police Commissioner
- Janagaraj as Subhash's father
- Manorama as Subhash's mother
- Charuhasan as Politician
- Babu Antony as Bob
- Y. Vijaya as Swathi
- Delhi Ganesh as Doctor
- Jai Ganesh as Lawyer
- Idichapuli Selvaraj as Astrologer
- Sangita Madhavan Nair as Orphan
- Manik Irani as Daddy's henchman
- Jack Gaud as Daddy's henchman

== Production ==
Initially, Rajinikanth was hesitant to take on the project due to the extensive commitment of a 100-day call sheet, but he eventually agreed after hearing the story.

== Soundtrack ==
Hamsalekha composed the music for the film.

Track listing
No.	Title	Lyrics	Singer(s)	Length
1.	"Chinna Kannamma"	Vairamuthu	S. P. Balasubrahmanyam, S. Janaki
2.	"Nallavan Nallavan"	Vairamuthu	S. P. Balasubrahmanyam
3.	"Thendrale Thendrale"	Vairamuthu	S. P. Balasubrahmanyam, S. Janaki
4.	"One Two Three"	Muthulingam	S. P. Balasubrahmanyam, K. S. Chithra
5.	"Veedi Katti Vilaiyadalama"	Muthulingam	S. P. Balasubrahmanyam, S. Janaki
6.	"Ore Moochi Ponal"	Muthulingam	S. Janaki
7.	"En Thayinmani Kodiye"	Vairamuthu	S. P. Balasubrahmanyam, S. Janaki
