= Ranbhoomi =

- Poster
- Directed by: Deepak Sareen
- Written by: K.K. Singh; Santosh Anand; Asad Bhopali (lyrics)
- Produced by: Vijay Sinha
- Starring: Jeetendra; Rishi Kapoor; Shatrughan Sinha; Dimple Kapadia; Neelam Kothari
- Cinematography: Ramesh Bhalla
- Edited by: Keshav Naidu
- Music by: Laxmikant–Pyarelal
- Production company: V.K.S. Films
- Release date: 16 August 1991
- Running time: 143 minutes
- Country: India
- Language: Hindi

Ranbhoomi (transl. Battlefield) is a 1991 Hindi-language action film, produced by Vijay Sinha under the V.K.S. Films banner and directed by Deepak Sareen. It stars Jeetendra, Rishi Kapoor, Shatrughan Sinha, Dimple Kapadia and Neelam, with music composed by Laxmikant–Pyarelal.

== Plot ==
Village born, simple-minded and honest, Bholanath comes to the big city with five hundred rupees, which he decides to keep with a prostitute, as he feels that his money will be a lot safer with her, than with him. He then befriends a dreaded gangster, Roopa, and goes to live and keep house for him. In an attempt to end hostilities between Roopa and rival gangster, Chandan Singh, he then offers himself as a hostage. But will the dreaded Roopa compromise to save Bholanath? And if so, will Chandan let Bhola live?

== Cast ==
- Jeetendra as Chandan Singh
- Shatrughan Sinha as Roopa Singh
- Rishi Kapoor as Bholanath
- Dimple Kapadia as Radha
- Neelam as Rani
- Raza Murad as Sanket Singh
- Gulshan Grover as Bhangadh
- Shekhar Suman as Dr. Paresh
- Parijat as Rajni (Paresh Wife)
- Annu Kapoor as Stationmaster
- Anjan Srivastav as Havaldar Bindeshwar Dubey
- Ram Sethi as Pyarelal
- Mangal Dhillon as Chandan's Henchman
- Yunus Parvez as Mithalwala
- Arun Bakshi as Hotel Owner
- Amita Nangia as Kammo (Roopa's Sister)
- Jagdish Raj as Police Officer
- Vikas Anand as Saw Mill Owner
- Kamaldeep as Grocery Shop Owner

== Soundtrack ==
#	Title	Singer(s)
1	"Peekar Shankarji Ki Booti"	Amit Kumar, Kavita Krishnamurthy
2	"Kaahe Mose Kare Jora Jori"	Anuradha Paudwal
3	"Wo Kaunsa Saaya Hai"	Jolly Mukherjee
4	"Main Naachoo Auron Ki Lagan Mein"	Nitin Mukesh
5	"Ladka Jab Ladki Se Lipte"	Amit Kumar, Sapna Mukherjee
