= Odi Vilayadu Mummy =

Indian Tamil-language children's game show

- ஓடி விளையாடு மம்மி
- Genre: Children; Game show
- Presented by: Sujitha
- Country of origin: India
- Original language: Tamil
- No. of seasons: 1
- No. of episodes: 17

Production
- Camera setup: Multi-camera
- Running time: approx. 40-45 minutes per episode

Original release
- Network: Puthuyugam TV
- Release: 1 June – 14 September 2014

Odi Vilayadu Mummy (Tamil: ஓடி விளையாடு மம்மி) is an Indian Tamil-language children's game show aired on Puthuyugam TV from 1 June 2014 to 14 September 2014 on every Sunday at 6:00PM IST for 17 episode. The show is anchored by actress Sujitha.

The game is played by mothers and their children, with the mothers playing for their kids. This game show is an interesting platform which provides an opportunity for the mothers to prove themselves by testing their physical and mental abilities through various segments. Odi Vilayadu Mummy started with four rounds. Odi Vilayadu Mummy also airs special programs on festive days by bringing in celebrity mothers and their kids.

== Gameplay format ==
- Round :1 Yaen amma smart(My Mummy is the smartest)
- Round :2 Yaen amma strong(My Mummy is the strongest)
- Round :3 Yaen amma fast(My Mummy is the fastest)
- Round :4 Yaen amma sharp(My Mummy is the sharpest)
