= Aparaahnam =

1991 Indian film

Aparahnam
- Directed by: M. P. Sukumaran Nair
- Written by: P. Balachandran; Sarathchandran; MP Sukumaran Nair (dialogues)
- Screenplay by: M. P. Sukumaran Nair
- Produced by: M. P. Sukumaran Nair
- Starring: Babu Antony; Kaviyoor Ponnamma; Ashwathy; M. Chandran Nair
- Cinematography: Aswani Kaul
- Edited by: M. Mani
- Music by: Jerry Amaldev
- Production company: Rachana Films
- Distributed by: Rachana Films
- Release date: 30 July 1991
- Country: India
- Language: Malayalam

Aparahnam (transl. Afternoon) is a 1991 Indian Malayalam-language film directed and produced by M. P. Sukumaran Nair. The film stars Babu Antony, Kaviyoor Ponnamma, Ashwathy and M. Chandran Nair.

== Cast ==
- Babu Antony as Nandakumar
- Kaviyoor Ponnamma as Nandakumar's mother
- Ashwathy
- M. Chandran Nair
- Murali
- Krishnankutty Nair
- Babu Namboothiri
- Jalaja
- N. L. Balakrishnan
- Vembayam Thampi
