= Poovinu Puthiya Poonthennal =

Poovinnu Puthiya Poonthennal
- Promotional Poster
- Directed by: Fazil
- Written by: Fazil
- Produced by: Swargachitra Appachan
- Starring: Mammootty; Suresh Gopi; Sujitha; Nadiya Moidu
- Cinematography: Anandakuttan
- Edited by: T. R. Sekhar
- Music by: Kannur Rajan
- Production company: Swargachitra
- Distributed by: Central Pictures
- Release date: 12 September 1986
- Country: India
- Language: Malayalam

Poovinnu Puthiya Poonthennal (transl. A Fresh Gentle Breeze for the Flower) is a 1986 Indian Malayalam-language action thriller film written and directed by Fazil. It stars Mammootty and Suresh Gopi in the lead while Sujitha, Nadiya Moidu, Babu Antony, Thilakan, Lalu Alex, Maniyanpilla Raju, Sukumari and Siddique appear in supporting roles. The film was produced by Swargachitra Appachan under his banner Swargachitra. It revolves around a drunkard widower who helps a deaf and mute boy find the killers of his parents. The film features original songs composed by Kannur Rajan and cinematography by Anandakuttan.

The film was released on 12 September 1986 on Onam to critical acclaim. It was later remade into six other languages — in Tamil as Poovizhi Vasalile, in Telugu as Pasivadi Pranam, in Kannada as Aapadbandhava, in Hindi as Hatya, in Bangladeshi as Khotipuron and in Sinhalese as Veda Barinam Vedak Nehe - becoming the first Malayalam film to be remade into six different languages and only the second Indian film to do so after Anuraga Aralithu.

== Plot ==
A deaf and mute boy witnesses his widowed mother being murdered by two men. Later, he escapes from them. Kiran is an alcoholic who is not able to recover from the tragic death of his family. Kiran finds the boy sleeping in the trash and adopts him, naming him Kittu, after his son. Soon he meets Neetha and become close friends without knowing that she is Kittu's aunt. Kittu recognizes his mother's murderer in a bar along with their boss. The police discovers the body of his mother and Neetha realizes it is her sister's son. Kiran kills the murderers and finally he also dies.

== Cast ==
- Mammootty as Kiran
- Suresh Gopi as Suresh
- Sujitha as Benny / Kittu
- Nadiya Moidu as Neetha
- Thilakan as Chandrasekhara Menon, Neetha and Sathi's father
- Lalu Alex as Inspector Simon
- Babu Antony as Renji
- Maniyanpilla Raju as Alex
- Sukumari as Doctor (cameo)
- Jayalalita as Sathi/Annie, Benny's mother
- N. F. Varghese as Hamsa, a man disguised as Benny's father (cameo appearance)
- Mini Arun as Neha, lady disguised as Benny's mother
- Mini Jairaj as the singer young woman in the bar
- Siddique as Vipin, Man at Priest's place
- Ajith Kollam as Gunda
- John Varghese as priest

== Soundtrack ==
The music was composed by Kannur Rajan with lyrics by Bichu Thirumala.

No.	Song	Singers	Lyrics	Length (m:ss)
1	"Aaro Aaro Aararo"	K. J. Yesudas	Bichu Thirumala	
2	"Aaro Aaro Aararo"	K. S. Chithra	Bichu Thirumala	
3	"Mounangalil Ninte Janmam"	K. J. Yesudas	Bichu Thirumala	
4	"Nenjinullil"	K. J. Yesudas, K. S. Chithra	Bichu Thirumala	
5	"Peeliyezhum Veeshi Vaa"	K. J. Yesudas, K. S. Chithra, Chorus	Bichu Thirumala	
6	"Peeliyezhum Veeshi Vaa" (F)	K. S. Chithra	Bichu Thirumala	
7	"Poove Ponpoove"	K. J. Yesudas	Bichu Thirumala	

== Reception ==
Upon release, the film flopped at the box office. According to producer Swargachitra Appachan, the film was not even able to make the money he had invested in it. Appachan felt that even with positive critical response, the film could not do well due to the fact that, there were six films releasing in the same week, out of which only Aavanazhi and Nandi Veendum Varika could achieve success and the film could not get the exposure due to the sheer amount of films released in the Onam week. Another reason for the failure of the film is believed to be because of the climax of the film in which Mammootty finally dies, which was not accepted by the audience. The producer says that in the Tamil version - Poovizhi Vasalile the protagonist doesn't die and hence, was a commercial success.

== Awards ==
Fazil won the Kerala State Film Award for Best Director for Ennennum Kannettante and Poovinu Puthiya Poonthennal.

Award	Category	Nominee(s)	Result
Kerala State Film Awards	Kerala State Film Award for Best Director	Fazil	Won

== Remakes ==
The movie was remade in six languages, all the climaxes of the films were different. Baby Sujitha and Babu Antony reprised their roles in four of the films. Interestingly, while the original did not performed well commercially, the remakes including Tamil, Telugu, Kannada and Hindi were box office successes with the Telugu version even becoming the highest-grossing Telugu film of all time.

Year	Film	Language	Ref.
1987	Poovizhi Vasalile	Tamil	
1987	Pasivadi Pranam	Telugu	
1987	Aapadbandhava	Kannada	
1988	Hatya	Hindi	
1989	Khotipuron	Bangladeshi/Bengali	
1991	Veda Barinam Vedak Nehe	Sinhalese	
