= Pasivadi Pranam =

- Theatrical poster
- Directed by: A. Kodandarami Reddy
- Written by: Story: Fazil; Screenplay: A. Kodandarami Reddy; Dialogues: Jandhyala
- Based on: Poovinu Puthiya Poonthennal (Malayalam)
- Produced by: Allu Aravind
- Starring: Chiranjeevi; Vijayashanti; Sumalatha; Raghuvaran; Babu Antony; Sujitha
- Cinematography: Lok Singh
- Edited by: M. Vellaiswamy
- Music by: K. Chakravarthy
- Production company: Geetha Arts
- Distributed by: Geetha Arts
- Release date: 23 July 1987
- Country: India
- Language: Telugu
- Box office: est. ₹4.75 crore (Distributor share)

Pasivadi Pranam is a 1987 Indian Telugu-language thriller film directed by A. Kodandarami Reddy, starring Chiranjeevi, Vijayashanti, Raghuvaran and Sujitha. The film was produced by Allu Aravind under Geetha Arts banner. It was a remake of the Malayalam film Poovinu Puthiya Poonthennal (1986).

Released on 23 July 1987, the movie became the highest-grossing Telugu film of the year and collecting a distributors' share of over ₹4.75 crore by surpassing the collections of all telugu films before

== Plot ==
Chakravarthy is a famous business tycoon. One night, he kills his general manager Sundaram with the help of his henchman Ranjith. This murder is seen by a woman Lakshmi and her infant son. Chakravarthy has Ranjith kill Lakshmi and tries to kill the son, but he runs away.

Madhu is a painter by profession and a drunkard. On his way home from a bar, he sees the kid sleeping on the road and takes him home. He names him Raja and takes care of him. One day, Raja sees Ranjith on the street so Ranjith and Chakravarthy become aware that he is living in town. Meanwhile, Madhu learns that Raja is a deaf-mute child and takes him to a doctor who confirms that Raja is born deaf-mute and must have been abandoned by his parents.

Madhu once gets acquainted with a girl named Geetha, who chides Raja for accidentally breaking her gift. She eventually realizes her mistake, befriends Raja and falls for Madhu. When she expresses her love, he reveals that he is married and his wife is deceased, but she persists. Meanwhile, Ranjith hires a blacksmith and his wife to act as Raja's parents and retrieve him from Madhu. However, Madhu realizes they are fake when they ask Raja to speak. They falsely claim that they are childless and wanted to adopt Raja, then Madhu kicks them out.

One day, Madhu and Raja visit Geetha's home where Raja is shocked to see a picture of his mother in their house. It is revealed that his mother Lakshmi is Geetha's elder sister. That night, Madhu gets drunk and passes out, while Ranjith breaks into the house and tries to kidnap Raja. Madhu saves Raja in the last minute and vows to never drink again, realizing that Raja's life is in danger. The next day, Madhu tangles with a gang on the road whom he beat up once at a bar. He gets arrested by the police, while Raja is secured by Geetha.

Geetha's father Chalapathi Rao, who disowned Lakshmi for marrying a Christian man, returns in search of Lakshmi. He arrives at Geetha's house where he sees and recognizes Raja as Lakshmi's son, whose real name is Benny, and he explains the same to Geetha. In prison, the police interrogate Madhu about Raja and his parents. They accuse Madhu of foul play but he claims that he is innocent. They go to Lakshmi's residence, where Raja explains to them through signals that his mother was stabbed with a knife by a bearded man. They discover Lakshmi's body buried in the backyard. Madhu escapes police custody and lands at a remote place where he asks the same blacksmith hired by Ranjith to break his handcuffs. Madhu is shocked to see that the blacksmith has children and realizes that he was hired by someone to kidnap Raja. Madhu demands a description of the man and sketches an image of him. He shows the picture to Raja and confirms that he is the killer.

Upon learning that General Manager Sundaram and Lakshmi were both murdered by the same person, Madhu goes to Chakravarthy's house and asks if he knows the person from the portrait he drew. Chakravarthy denies but Madhu notices that he is involved in the crime. Police Inspector Reddy demands Chakravarthy to have all his staff members ready for an identification parade to find the criminal. As a final resort, Chakravarthy and Ranjith try to kidnap Raja. Ranjith breaks into Geetha's home and takes Raja but is cornered by Madhu who kills him in a final duel. Chakravarthy successfully kidnaps Raja and takes him to a building terrace. Madhu reaches them and Chakravarthy blackmails him to jump off the terrace or else he will kill Raja. Madhu manages to get back on his feet and fight them. In a final duel, Madhu kills Chakravarthy and saves Raja. Madhu and Geetha marry and adopt Raja.

== Cast ==
- Chiranjeevi as Madhu
- Vijayashanti as Geetha
- Raghuvaran as Chakravarthy
- Babu Antony as Ranjith
- Sujitha as Raja / Benny
- Kannada Prabhakar as Inspector Reddy
- Brahmanandam in cameo appearance
- Sumalatha as Madhu's wife [special appearance]
- Rajyalakshmi as Lakshmi, Raja's mother
- Allu Ramalingaiah as a blacksmith
- Gummadi as Chalapathi Rao
- Giribabu as Venu, Madhu's friend
- Jaggayya as a church father
- Prasad Babu as General Manager Sundaram
- P.J. Sarma as E.N.T. Specialist

== Soundtrack ==
All songs were composed by K. Chakravarthy with lyrics written by Acharya Aatreya and Veturi. Vocals by S. P. Balasubrahmanyam, P. Susheela and S. Janaki.

Song	Playback Singers	Lyrics	Length
"Satyam Shivam Sundaram"	S. P. Balasubrahmanyam	Acharya Aatreya	4:16
"Andam Sharanam"	S. P. Balasubrahmanyam & P. Susheela	Acharya Aatreya	4:15
"Idedo Golaga"	S. P. Balasubrahmanyam & S. Janaki	Veturi	4:19
"Kashmiri Loyalo"	S. P. Balasubrahmanyam & S. Janaki	Veturi	4:32
"Chakkani Chukkala"	S. P. Balasubrahmanyam & S. Janaki	Veturi	4:32

== Reception ==
The film collected a share of over ₹4.75 crore in its theatrical run.

This movie was Chiranjeevi's first silver-jubilee hit. It had a 175-day direct run in Prathap theatre(Tirupati)with daily 5 shows (Still All India record). In those days, a Telugu movie running for 100 days direct centres with only 3 or 4 daily shows was also very difficult due to the introduction of the slab system by AP State Govt. in 1984.It has record run of 100 days direct in 11 centres(Previous record 6 direct centres).This film also set record of a Telugu movie has a run of 100 days daily 5 shows in 3 centres (Tirupati, Nellore, Anathapur). Previously another Telugu movie ran in 2 centres for 100 days with 5 shows per a day (Tirupati, Kurnool). It became the first South Indian movie to be dubbed into Russian language. In 1982, Russian people enjoyed the dance of Mithun Chakraborty in Disco Dancer. Again, in 1987, they felt the same with Chiranjeevi's dance.. Due to the influence of this film, later, Chiranjeevi and K.Viswanath's "Swayamkrushi" was also dubbed into Russian language.
