= Poovizhi Vasalile =

- Poster
- Directed by: Fazil
- Written by: Fazil; Gokula Krishnan (dialogues)
- Based on: Poovinu Puthiya Poonthennal (1986) by Fazil
- Starring: Sathyaraj; Sujitha; Karthika
- Cinematography: Anandakuttan; Jayanan Vincent
- Edited by: T. R. Sekhar
- Music by: Ilaiyaraaja
- Production company: Lakshmi Priya Combines
- Distributed by: Manoj Films
- Release date: 14 January 1987
- Running time: 155 minutes
- Country: India
- Language: Tamil

Poovizhi Vasalile (transl. Eye at the door) is a 1987 Indian Tamil-language thriller film directed by Fazil. The film stars Sathyaraj, Sujitha and Karthika, with Raghuvaran, Babu Antony, Nizhalgal Ravi, T. S. Raghavendra and Rajyalakshmi playing supporting roles. It is a remake of the 1986 Malayalam film Poovinu Puthiya Poonthennal. The film was released on 14 January 1987 and attained cult status.

== Plot ==
A deaf-mute boy Benny and his mother Stella witness a man getting killed by Anand and Ranjith. The killers also kill the mother, but Benny manages to escape from them.

Jeeva is an alcoholic who is not able to recover from the tragic death of his family. Jeeva finds Benny sleeping in the trash and adopts him as Raja, naming him after his son. Soon, he meets Yamuna and they become close friends without knowing that she is Raja's aunt. Raja recognises his mother's murderer in a bar along with their boss.

First, the police arrest Jeeva for kidnapping Raja and for hiding his mother Stella, but the police discover Stella's body with Raja's help and Yamuna understands the boy is none other than her sister's son Benny. Thereafter, Anand and Ranjith kidnap Raja from Yamuna, but Jeeva kills the murderers and goes to jail.

== Cast ==
- Sathyaraj as Jeeva
- Sujitha as Benny / Raja
- Karthika as Yamuna
- Raghuvaran as Anand
- Babu Antony as Ranjith
- Nizhalgal Ravi as Inspector Ravi
- T. S. Raghavendra as Vishwanathan, Ganga & Yamuna's father
- Rajyalakshmi as Ganga / Stella, Benny's mother
- Adoor Bhasi as Father Joseph Stephen
- Sreenath as Micheal, Benny's father (guest appearance)
- Charle in a guest appearance
- Delhi Ganesh as Dr.Venkatram (guest appearance)
- Maniyanpilla Raju
- Chittan as Sakkarakatti
- Sivagami

== Soundtrack ==
The soundtrack was composed by Ilaiyaraaja.

Song	Singer(s)	Lyrics	Duration
"Aattam Ingey"	Malaysia Vasudevan, S. P. Sailaja	Kamakodiyan	4:27
"Anne Anne"	Mano	Ilaiyaraaja	4:14
"Chinna Chinna Roja Poove"	K. J. Yesudas	Muthulingam	4:29
"Oru Kiliyin" (duet)	K. J. Yesudas, K. S. Chithra	Gangai Amaran	4:35
"Oru Kiliyin" (female)	K. S. Chithra	Gangai Amaran	4:31
"Paattu Engae"	S. P Shailaja, Malaysia Vasudevan	Kamakodiyan	4:27

== Reception ==
Jayamanmadhan of Kalki appreciated Fazil for being able to visually convey what he wanted, but said Ilaiyaraaja's music, Raghuvaran's acting and the cinematography were "okay. okay".

== Legacy ==
Poovizhi Vaasalile gained a cult following and has been noted for the villainous performance of Antony and Raghuvaran. Eashvar Karthic regarding his film Penguin (2020), said that "Faazil’s Poovizhi Vaasalile has given me many scary nights. I have always wanted to do a film like that".
