= Aaina (1993 film) =

- Release poster
- Directed by: Deepak Sareen
- Written by: Honey Irani; Shanker Iyer; Rahi Masoom Reza
- Produced by: Yash Chopra; Pamela Chopra
- Starring: Jackie Shroff; Amrita Singh; Juhi Chawla
- Cinematography: Romesh Bhalla; Nazir Khan
- Edited by: Keshav Naidu
- Music by: Dilip Sen-Sameer Sen
- Production company: Yash Raj Films
- Release date: 18 June 1993
- Running time: 149 minutes
- Country: India
- Language: Hindi

Aaina (transl. Mirror) is a 1993 Indian Hindi-language romantic drama film directed by Deepak Sareen, produced by Yash Chopra and his wife Pamela Chopra. It stars Jackie Shroff, Amrita Singh, Juhi Chawla in lead roles, with Deepak Tijori in a supporting role. The film was a blockbuster hit and solidified Chawla's career as a leading lady in the 1990s. Singh's performance in a negative role was highly appreciated and is regarded as one of her career-best performances. The film was remade in Telugu as Aayanaki Iddaru (1995), in Tamil as Kalyana Vaibhogam (1997), in Dhivehi as Dhauvaa (1998), and in Kannada as Yare Nee Abhimani (2000).

== Plot ==
Rajnesh Mathur, a wealthy businessman, has two daughters. Roma, the elder one is very competitive and has always been spoiled. Beautiful and shy, Reema is quite reserved and usually lets Roma take the spotlight. They both grow up to be entirely different personalities. Reema meets Ravi Saxena at a bookstore and immediately falls in love with him, having admired him through his books. Later on, Ravi meets Roma at an art gallery. He notices that she has the same taste in art as him, and he is immediately smitten with her. The art gallery owner gives Ravi her personal card. He then attends an auction where Roma, annoyed by him, tricks him into buying a sink, toilet and a bathtub. The next day, Ravi sends all these things to Roma's house and leaves his number on the mirror. They meet at a cafe where Ravi confesses that he has fallen in love with her. Sunil Bhatnagar, a photographer, approaches Roma and asks if he can take some photos of her, for the cover of a magazine. She agrees and after they take the photos, Ravi proposes to her and asks her to marry him. She asks him to take her family's permission first. The Mathurs are overjoyed, except Rajnesh, who knew about Reema's love for Ravi. Reema hides her pain as Ravi and Roma get engaged.

Sunil and Roma go to Ravi's office show him the success of Roma's photoshoot. Roma asks Ravi if she can continue modelling but he doesn't want her to continue it. Roma then declines modelling, but continues it behind Ravi's back. When some men recognize her from the photoshoot and eve-tease her, Ravi gets into a fight with them and later tells Roma that this was the reason why he didn't want her to continue modelling. But the next day, when Roma and Ravi are supposed to go the theatre together, she again lies to him that she has a headache so that she can go for another photoshoot. So, Ravi goes with Reema instead and they become good friends.

The day before the wedding, Roma gets offered a film by Sunil, who tells her to choose between modelling and marriage. Thus, Roma flees on her wedding day and leaves a letter behind, much to the shock of the Mathurs. In the letter, Roma suggests that she and Ravi can marry later but Ravi, disillusioned with her, asks Rajnesh for his permission to marry Reema, whom he thinks of as a good friend. Reema reluctantly agrees and marries Ravi. On their wedding night, Reema and Ravi agree not to rush things and stay as friends until Reema can think of Ravi as something more. With encouragement from Ravi's brother, Reema learns not to hide her beauty. Reema and Ravi gradually fall in love.

However their marital bliss is disturbed when Roma makes an unexpected return, calling Reema a traitorous sister and Ravi an unfaithful lover. As Ravi takes a stand for Reema, Roma leaves angrily. When they both are restless due to the encounter with Roma, they receive a phone from Roma's mother to inform them that she tried committing suicide. Reema and Ravi rush to the hospital and they find out Rajnesh kicked Roma out of his house. Roma pretends to feel guilty, and Reema lets her live in her house. Later on, Roma tells Reema that she was replaced by a famous actress in the film for which she had run from her wedding.

Roma makes a move on Ravi at his office, despite him adamantly telling her that he no longer has any feelings for her. Angered, she slits her wrist in front of Ravi and he rushes her to the hospital. Reema is left alone as Ravi constantly cares for Roma. When Ravi returns from a business trip, Roma doesn't inform this to Reema and comes out from the shower in Ravi's room just as Ravi returns. Disturbed by this, Reema pleads Roma to stop pursuing Ravi, but Roma only mocks her. Roma then throws Ravi a surprise party on his birthday to prevent Reema from spending time alone with him. Reema confronts her and asks Ravi to tell her what Roma means to him. When Ravi stays silent, Reema thinks that he too loves Roma. She is heartbroken as Ravi and Reema leave the house together.

As they leave, Ravi drives the car too fast and just as it seems that their car is about to go off a cliff, Roma jumps out of a car. At their honeymoon cottage, Ravi tells her that the recent event proved that Roma never cared about him and that she wants him just to defeat her sister. He also tells her that he came to know from the doctor that her suicide attempts were fake. He reveals to Roma that he pretended being in love with her to see how far she would go for him, and that he deeply loves Reema. Roma belittles Reema, calling her less beautiful than herself. Ravi angrily smashes all mirrors in the room and tells Roma that beauty is within a person and it cannot be seen in a mirror. He says that he sees this beauty only in Reema. Infuriated, Roma approaches Reema with a shard of mirror but breaks down and apologizes for her selfish behavior. The sisters hug and reconcile. Reema and Ravi marry again with joy, while Rajnesh accepts Roma into the house again.

== Cast ==
- Jackie Shroff as Ravi Saxena: Reema's husband
- Amrita Singh as Roma Mathur: Reema's sister and Ravi's ex-fiancée
- Juhi Chawla as Reema Mathur Saxena: Roma's sister and Ravi's wife
- Deepak Tijori as Vinay Saxena: Ravi's brother and Reema's brother-in-law
- Saeed Jaffrey as Rajnesh Mathur: Roma and Reema's father
- Dina Pathak as Rajnesh's mother: Roma and Reema's grandmother
- Maya Alagh as Mohini Mathur: Rajnesh's wife and Roma and Reema's mother
- Rajesh Khattar as Sunil Bhatnagar: A photographer
- Vikas Anand as Bhatia
- Yunus Parvez as Auctioneer
- Virendra Saxena as Pradeep

== Soundtrack ==
All the songs were composed by Dilip Sen and Sameer Sen and lyrics were penned by Sameer.

#	Song	Singer
1.	"Goriya Re Goriya"	Lata Mangeshkar, Jolly Mukherjee
2.	"Banno Ki Aayegi Baraat"-1	Pamela Chopra
3.	"Dil Ne Dil Se Kya Kahan"	Lata Mangeshkar, Nitin Mukesh
4.	"Banno Ki Aayegi Baraat"-2	Pamela Chopra
5.	"Meri Saanson Mein Tum"	Asha Bhosle, Kumar Sanu
6.	"Yeh Raat Khushnaseeb Hai"	Lata Mangeshkar
7.	"Aaina Hai Mera Chehra"	Lata Mangeshkar, Asha Bhosle, Suresh Wadkar
8.	"Saansen Behki"	Asha Bhosle

== Awards ==
39th Filmfare Awards:

Won

- Best Supporting Actress – Amrita Singh
