= List of songs recorded by K. S. Chithra =

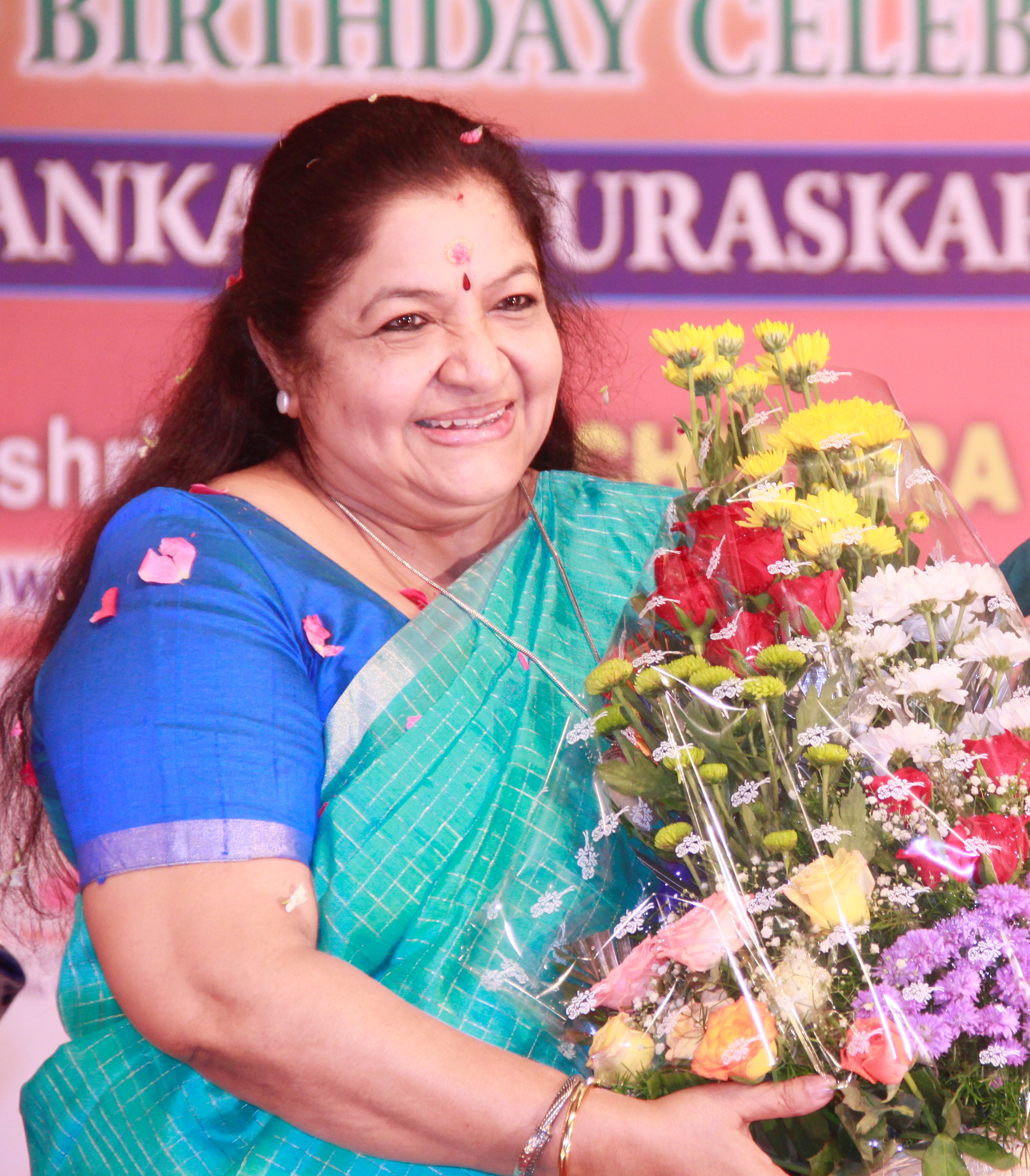
K S Chithra at an event

Krishnan Nair Shantakumari Chithra (born 27 July 1963), credited as K. S. Chithra, is an Indian playback singer and Carnatic musician. In a career spanning over five decades, she has recorded 20,000 songs in various Indian languages including Malayalam, Telugu, Tamil, Kannada, Hindi, Odia, Bengali, Marathi, Manipuri, Punjabi, Gujarati, Tulu, Rajasthani, Urdu, Sanskrit, and Badaga as well as foreign languages such as Malay, Latin, Arabic, Sinhalese, English and French. She is also known for her extensive history of collaboration in the songs with Music Composers A.R. Rahman, Ilaiyaraja, Hamsalekha, M. M. Keeravani and with the playback singers KJ Yesudas and SP Balasubramaniyam over the years. She is regarded as a cultural icon of Kerala and is fondly called as the Melody Queen and Nightingale of South India.

Chithra is a recipient of six National Film Awards, nine Filmfare Awards South and 36 different state film awards. She has won film awards from all the four south Indian states. She was awarded India's third highest civilian honour Padma Bhushan in 2021 and Padma Shri in 2005 for her valuable contributions towards the Indian musical fraternity. Chithra is the first Indian woman who was honoured by the House of Commons, British Parliament, United Kingdom in 1997 and is the only singer from India who was honoured by the Government of China at the Qinghai International Music and Water Festival in 2009. She is conferred with the highest honour of Rotary International, For the Sake of Honour award in 2001 and has received the MTV Video Music Award – International Viewer's Choice at the Metropolitan Opera House, New York in 2001. She received honorary doctorates from Sathyabama University in 2011 and from The International Tamil University, United States in 2018.

== Tamil film songs ==
This is the Incomplete list

=== 1985 ===
Film	No	Song	Composer(s)	Writer(s)	Co-artist(s)
Sindhu Bhairavi	1	"Naan Oru Sindhu"	Ilayaraaja	Vairamuthu	
Sindhu Bhairavi	2	"Paadariyen"	Ilayaraaja	Vairamuthu	
Poove Poochooda Vaa	3	"Chinna Kuyil Paadum"	Ilayaraaja	Vairamuthu	
Poove Poochooda Vaa	4	"Pattasu Chuttu"	Ilayaraaja	Vairamuthu	
Poove Poochooda Vaa	5	"Poovae Poochudava"(Female Version)	Ilayaraaja	Vairamuthu	
Idaya Kovil	6	"Oororama Aathupakkam"	Ilayaraaja	Vaali	Ilayaraaja
Aan Paavam	7	"Kuyile Kuyile Poonguyile"	Ilayaraaja	Vaali	Malaysia Vasudevan
Chinna Veedu	8	"Jaamam Aagi Pochu"	Ilayaraaja	Kuruvikkarambai Shanmugam	Malaysia Vasudevan
Naane Raja Naane Mandhiri	9	"Thegam Sirakadikkum"	Ilayaraaja	Muhammed Metha	Jayachandran
Geethanjali	10	"Oru Jeevan"(Happy)	Ilayaraaja		Ilaiyaraaja
Geethanjali	11	"Malare Pesu"	Ilayaraaja		Ilaiyaraaja
Geethanjali	12	"Oru Jeevan"(Sad)	Ilayaraaja		
Geethanjali	13	"Thulli Ezhunthathu"	Ilayaraaja		
Muthal Mariyathai	14	"Antha Nilava Thaan"	Ilayaraaja	Vairamuthu	Ilaiyaraaja
Thanga Mama 3D	15	"Vaan Veliyil Vannapparvai"	Ilayaraaja		Ilaiyaraaja
Puthiya Theerppu	16	"Ethanai Ethanai"	Ilayaraaja		
Puthiya Theerppu	17	"Raasa Manam"	Ilayaraaja		
Urimai	18	"Anbe Anbe"	Ilayaraaja		

=== 1986 ===
Film	No	Song	Composer(s)	Writer(s)	Co-artist(s)
Aayiram Kannudayaal	19	"Sirikkatthaane"	Shankar–Ganesh		
Africavil Appu	20	"Kanmani Appu"	Ilaiyaraaja		
Amman Kovil Kizhakale	21	"Un Paarvayil"	Ilaiyaraaja		
Aruvadai Naal	22	"Devanin Kovil"	Ilaiyaraaja		
December Pookal	23	"Intha Vennila"	Ilaiyaraaja		
December Pookal	24	"Maalaigal Idam"	Ilaiyaraaja		
December Pookal	25	"Nooraandu Kaalam"	Ilaiyaraaja		
Dharma Pathini	26	"Mutham Katti Mutham"	Ilaiyaraaja		
Enakku Nane Needipathi	27	"Thiruda Thiruda"	Ilaiyaraaja		
Kadalora Kavithaigal	28	"Podinadaya Poravare"	Ilaiyaraaja	Gangai Amaran	
Karimedu Karuvayan	29	"Silukku Thavani"	Ilaiyaraaja		
Kodai Mazhai	30	"Kaatrodu Kuzhalin"	Ilaiyaraaja		
Maaveeran	31	"Hey Maina"	Ilaiyaraaja		
Maaveeran	32	"Nee Koduththatha"	Ilaiyaraaja		
Maaveeran	33	"Sokku Podi"	Ilaiyaraaja		
Mandhira Punnagai	34	"Pavala Malligai"	Ilaiyaraaja		
Manithanin Marupakkam	35	"Santhosam Indru"	Ilaiyaraaja		
Manithanin Marupakkam	36	"Kannanai Kanpaya"	Ilaiyaraaja		
Mella Thirandhathu Kadhavu	37	"Kuzhaloodum Kannanukku"	Ilaiyaraaja		
Mella Thirandhathu Kadhavu	38	"Sakkara Kattikku"	Ilaiyaraaja		
Murattu Karangal	39	"Kanni Ponnu"	Ilaiyaraaja		
Murattu Karangal	40	"Rathiri Paattu"	Ilaiyaraaja		
Murattu Karangal	41	"Naan Unnai"	Ilaiyaraaja		
Murattu Karangal	42	"Oru Poongodi"	Ilaiyaraaja		
Neethana Antha Kuyil	1	"Poojaiketha Poovithu"	Ilaiyaraaja		
Neethana Antha Kuyil	44	"Kannana Kanna"(Female)	Ilaiyaraaja		
Punnagai Mannan	45	"Yedhedho Ennam Valarthen"	Ilaiyaraaja	Vairamuthu	
Punnagai Mannan	46	"Vaan Megam Poo Poovaai"	Ilaiyaraaja	Vairamuthu	
Punnagai Mannan	47	"Kaala Kaalamaaga Vaazhum"	Ilaiyaraaja	Vairamuthu	S. P. Balasubrahmanyam
Punnagai Mannan	48	"Singalathu Chinnakuyile"	Ilaiyaraaja	Vairamuthu	S. P. Balasubrahmanyam
Ratchasan	49	"Malli Malli Ithu"	Ilaiyaraaja		
Ratchasan	50	"Kiliye Ilam"	Ilaiyaraaja		
Ratchasan	51	"Yeh Naughty"	Ilaiyaraaja		
Ratchasan	52	"Maachan Maachan"	Ilaiyaraaja		
Ratchasan	53	"Nee Mutham"	Ilaiyaraaja		
Thaaiku Oru Thaalaattu	54	"Kadhala Kadhala"	Ilaiyaraaja		
Vidinja Kalyanam	55	"Kaalam Ilavenil"	Ilaiyaraaja		
Vikram	56	"En Jodi Manja Kuruvi"	Ilaiyaraaja		
Badhil Solvaal Badrakali	57	"Ashta Thikkilum"	K. V. Mahadevan		
Badhil Solvaal Badrakali	58	"Manja Kungumam"	K. V. Mahadevan		
Badhil Solvaal Badrakali	59	"Thotta Sinunguriye"	K. V. Mahadevan		
Kanmaniye Pesu	60	"Vaanam Engal Ellai"	Raveendran		
Kanmaniye Pesu	61	"Vilakku Vetcha"	Raveendran		
Lakshmi Vandhachu	62	"Kaalam Kanindhadhu"	Raveendran		
Lakshmi Vandhachu	63	"Naan Aanaiyittal"	Raveendran		
Naalellam Pournami	64	"Nee Thaana Nesam"	Gangai Amaran		
Naalellam Pournami	65	"Saathi Malligai"	Gangai Amaran		
Nambinar Keduvathillai	66	"Gokula Kanna"	M. S. Viswanathan		
Nambinar Keduvathillai	67	"Jyothisa Roobane"	M. S. Viswanathan		
Namma Ooru Nalla Ooru	68	"Singara Kaathu	Gangai Amaran		
Odangal	69	"Yen Azhuthai Megale"	Sampath Selvam		
Odangal	70	"Poove Enna Poraattam"	Sampath Selvam		K. J. Yesudas
Panneer Nadhigal	71	"Rojappu"	Shankar–Ganesh		S. P. Balasubrahmanyam
Panneer Nadhigal	72	"Chinnanchiru"	Shankar–Ganesh		
Pookalai Pareekatheergal	73	"Solaigal Ellam"	T. Rajendar		
Pookalai Pareekatheergal	74	"Adi Ammadi Chinna"	T. Rajendar		
Samsaram Adhu Minsaram	75	"Janaki Devi"	Shankar–Ganesh		
Sigappu Malargal	76	"Mutthamitta"	M. S. Viswanathan		
Thalaiyatti Bommaigal	77	"Vanduirukka Mannanku"	Gangai Amaran		
Thalaiyatti Bommaigal	78	"Aye Athaa"	Gangai Amaran		Malaysia Vasudevan
Agni Karangal	79	"Kangale Sol Nee"	Rajesh Roshan		Mano
Agni Karangal	80	"Aasai Manathu"	Rajesh Roshan		
Agni Karangal	81	"Naa Indru"	Rajesh Roshan		

=== 1987 ===
Film	No	Song	Composer(s)	Writer(s)	Co-artist(s)
Aalappirandhavan	82	"Yethivecha"	Ilaiyaraaja		
Aayusu Nooru	83	"Bramhadevan"	T. Rajendar		
Ananda Aradhanai	84	"Padapporen"	Manoj Gyan		
Ananda Aradhanai	85	"Naalai Namadhenna"	Manoj Gyan		
Ananda Aradhanai	86	"Kaalam Iniya"	Manoj Gyan		
Chellakutti	87	"Kamadevanin Kadhal"	Gangai Amaran		
Chellakutti	88	"Chella Kutti Chinna"	Gangai Amaran		
Chellakutti	89	"Thaayum Naane"	Gangai Amaran		P. Jayachandran
Chinna Kuyil Paaduthu	90	"Unnai Naane"	Ilaiyaraaja		
Chinna Kuyil Paaduthu	91	"Chithirai Mathathu"	Ilaiyaraaja		
Chinna Thambi Periya Thambi	92	"Mazhayin Thulaiyile"	Gangai Amaran		
Chinna Thambi Periya Thambi	93	"Oru Aala Marathula"	Gangai Amaran		
Chinna Thambi Periya Thambi	94	"Yayya Yayya"	Gangai Amaran		S. P. Sailaja
Chinnamanikkuyile	95	"Azhagiya"	V S Narasimhan		S. P. Balasubrahmanyam
Enga Ooru Pattukaran	96	"Madura Marikkozhunthu"	Ilaiyaraaja		
En Paadal Unakkaaga	97	"Vaanmele"	Ilaiyaraaja		
En Paadal Unakkaaga	98	"Vaa Vaa Kanmani"	Ilaiyaraaja		
En Paadal Unakkaaga	99	"Nooruruba"	Ilaiyaraaja		
En Paadal Unakkaaga	100	"Devi Durga Devi"	Ilaiyaraaja		
Gramatthu Minnal	101	"Kanne En"	Ilaiyaraaja		
Gramatthu Minnal	102	"Vatti Edutha"	Ilaiyaraaja		
Gramatthu Minnal	103	"Rettai Kili Suthi"	Ilaiyaraaja		
Gramatthu Minnal	104	"Nee Pogum Paathaiyil"	Ilaiyaraaja		
Idho Innoru Devdas	105	"I Love You"	Laxmikant–Pyarelal		
Idho Innoru Devdas	106	"Aaduthappa Aallirani"	Laxmikant–Pyarelal		
Idho Innoru Devdas	107	"Kanavukkul Kannum"	Laxmikant–Pyarelal		
Idhu Oru Thodar Kathai	108	"Pillaikoru"	Gangai Amaran		
Ini Oru Sudhanthiram	109	"Kaigalile Valuvirukku"	Gangai Amaran		
Ini Oru Sudhanthiram	110	"Mogathai Kondruvidu"	Gangai Amaran		
Iniya Uravu Poothathu	111	"Oru Poomalai Athil"	Ilaiyaraaja		
Iniya Uravu Poothathu	112	"Chittu Pole Mottu"	Ilaiyaraaja		
Ivargal Varungala Thoongal	113	"Mattrum Thurandha"	T. Rajendar		
Jaathi Pookkal	114	"Poo Malaigal Eru Thol"	M. S. Viswanathan		K. J. Yesudas
Jallikattu	115	"Kathi Chandai"	Ilaiyaraaja		
Kadhal Parisu	116	"Puraakale Puraakale"	Ilaiyaraaja		
Kathai Kathayam Karanamam	117	"Thudikidu Thudikidu"	M. S. Viswanathan		S. P. Balasubrahmanyam
Kavalan Avan Kovalan	118	"Oruvanukku Oruthi"	Vijay Anand		
Kizhakku Africavil Sheela	119	"Semmeni Ponno"	Bappi Lahiri		K. J. Yesudas
Kizhakku Africavil Sheela	120	"Sheela O My Sheela"	Bappi Lahiri		K. J. Yesudas
Kizhakku Africavil Sheela	121	"Thatharimi Thanna"	Bappi Lahiri		
Kootu Puzhukkal	122	"Innaikku Nadandha"	M. S. Viswanathan		
Kudumbam Oru Kovil	123	"Kudumbam Oru"	M. Ranga Rao		
Kudumbam Oru Kovil	124	"Manmadham Koil"	M. Ranga Rao		
Manathil Uruthi Vendum	125	"Kannin Maniyae"	Ilaiyaraaja		
Manathil Uruthi Vendum	126	"Kannaa Varuvaayaa"	Ilaiyaraaja		
Manathil Uruthi Vendum	127	"Aachchi Aachchi"	Ilaiyaraaja		
Manathil Uruthi Vendum	128	"Sangathamizh Kaviye"	Ilaiyaraaja		
Mangai Oru Gangai	129	"Azhaghyiya Metha Nilavidhu"	Laxmikant–Pyarelal		
Mangai Oru Gangai	130	"Achamilla Pathaliel"	Laxmikant–Pyarelal		
Manithan	131	"Yedho Nadakkirathu"	Chandrabose		
Meendum Mahathma	132	"Pattu Poochi"	V. Kumar		
Megam Karuththirukku	133	"Ding Dong"	Manoj Gyan		
Megam Karuththirukku	134	"Adiyamma Rakkayi"	Manoj Gyan		
Megam Karuththirukku	135	"Karuppa Adu"	Manoj Gyan		
Muthukkal Moondru	136	"Ennayya Manasilu"	T. Rajendar		
Muthukkal Moondru	137	"Mama Mama"	T. Rajendar		
Muthukkal Moondru	138	"Aazham Thriyama"	T. Rajendar		
Muthukkal Moondru	139	"Poove Chinna"	T. Rajendar		
Nalla Pambu	140	"Sagara Sangamam"	Shankar–Ganesh		
Nalla Pambu	141	"Kodia Nila"	Shankar–Ganesh		
Nalla Pambu	142	"Ithu Kangeyan"(Female)	Shankar–Ganesh		
Nayakan	143	"Nee Oru Kadhal Sangeetham"	Ilaiyaraaja		
Neram Nalla Irukku	144	"Sammatham Sammatham"	M. S. Viswanathan		K. J. Yesudas
Ninaikka Therintha Mamamey	145	"Engengu Nee"(Duet)	Ilaiyaraaja		
Ninaikka Therintha Mamamey	146	"Ilamai Rathathil Iyarakai"	Ilaiyaraaja		
Ninaive Oru Sangeetham	147	"Aethamayya Aetham"	Ilaiyaraaja		
Ninaive Oru Sangeetham	148	"Sandha Kadal"	Ilaiyaraaja		
Ondru Engal Jathiye	149	"Nilavukku Ilaiyavalo"	Gangai Amaran		Mano
Oorkavalan	150	"Maasi Maasam Thaan"	Shankar–Ganesh		
Oorkavalan	151	"Aathukkulley"	Shankar–Ganesh		
Oorkavalan	152	"Melang Kotti Aadu"	Shankar–Ganesh		
Oru Thayin Sabhatham	153	"Sollamathane Intha"	T. Rajendar		
Paadu Nilave	154	"Kuthamma Nellu Kuthu"	Ilaiyaraaja		
Paadu Nilave	155	"Kokkarako Koovura"	Ilaiyaraaja		
Paadu Nilave	156	"Paadungal Paattu"	Ilaiyaraaja		
Paadu Nilave	157	"Chithirai Maadhathu"	Ilaiyaraaja		
Paadu Nilave	158	"Vaa Veliyae Ilam Poonguyile"	Ilaiyaraaja		
Paadu Nilave	159	"Malaiyoram Veesum"(Female)	Ilaiyaraaja		
Poo Mazhai Pozhiyuthu	160	"Nadiya Nadiya"	R. D. Burman		
Poo Mazhai Pozhiyuthu	161	"Emama"	R. D. Burman		
Poo Mazhai Pozhiyuthu	162	"Ellarum Paithiyam"	R. D. Burman		
Poo Mazhai Pozhiyuthu	163	"My Name Is Aasha"	R. D. Burman		
Poo Poova Poothirukku	164	"Kuku Kuku Kuyile"	T. Rajendar		
Pookkal Vidum Thoodhu	165	"Paadu Paatu"	T. Rajendar		
Pookkal Vidum Thoodhu	166	"Moongil Katoram"(Duet)	T. Rajendar		
Poove Ilam Poove	167	"Putham Pudhiyadhu"	Amal Dev		S. P. Balasubrahmanyam
Poovizhi Vasalile	168	"Oru Kiliyin"(Female)	Ilaiyaraaja		
Poovizhi Vasalile	169	"Oru Kiliyin"(Duet)	Ilaiyaraaja		K. J. Yesudas
Puyal Paadum Paattu	170	"Kannaana Kanne"	Ilaiyaraaja		
Puyal Paadum Paattu	171	"Annadam Kasatapattalum"	Ilaiyaraaja		
Raja Mariyadhai	172	"Vannakkiliye Vadi Veliye"	Shankar–Ganesh		
Rettai Vaal Kuruvi	173	"Suthanthiratha Vaangi Puttom"	Ilaiyaraaja		
Rettai Vaal Kuruvi	174	"Thathedutha Muthu Pillai"	Ilaiyaraaja		
Sattam Oru Vilayaattu	175	"Sugam Tharum Nila"	M. S. Viswanathan		
Thaye Neeye Thunai	176	"Bhuvaneshwari"	Raveendran		
Thaye Neeye Thunai	177	"Aayiram Kangal"	Raveendran		
Thaye Neeye Thunai	178	"Chella Kiliye"	Raveendran		
Theertha Karaiyinile	179	"Kotti Kidakkuthu"	Ilaiyaraaja		
Theertha Karaiyinile	180	"Vizhiyil Pudhu Kavithai"	Ilaiyaraaja		
Thirumathi Oru Vegumathi	181	"Kattipudi Samy Dharisanam"	Shankar–Ganesh		
Thulasi	182	"Anbe Idhu Kadhal"	Sampath Selvam		
Thulasi	183	"Kathavu Thoranthu"	Sampath Selvam		
Ullam Kavarntha Kalvan	184	"Kalangathale Oru Padam"	Ilaiyaraaja		
Ullam Kavarntha Kalvan	185	"Poothendral Pogum Pathai"	Ilaiyaraaja		
Vaazhga Valarga	186	"Thoondaa Mani"	Ilaiyaraaja		
Vaazhga Valarga	187	"Apoothu"	Ilaiyaraaja		
Vedham Pudhithu	188	"Kannukkul Nooru"	Devendran		
Vedham Pudhithu	189	"Putham Pudhu Olai"	Devendran		
Veerapandiyan	190	"Chittu Kuruvi"	Shankar–Ganesh		
Veerapandiyan	191	"Muthumani Pullaku"	Shankar–Ganesh		
Veerapandiyan	192	"Maalaiya Katta"	Shankar–Ganesh		
Veeran Veluthambi	193	"Vechakuri"	S. A. Rajkumar		
Velaikkaran	194	"Va Va Va Kanna"	Ilaiyaraaja		
Velundu Vinaiyillai	195	"Pothaicha"	M. S. Viswanathan		
Vilangu	196	"Enna Aachchu Enna Aachchu"	Shyam		
Yettiki Potti	197	"Unnaippola"	Gangai Amaran		
Yettiki Potti	198	"Rosave Rasa"	Gangai Amaran		
Yettiki Potti	199	"Ketten Naan"	Gangai Amaran		

=== 1988 ===
Film	No	Song	Composer(s)	Writer(s)	Co-artist(s)
Agni Natchathiram	200	"Ninnukori Varanam"	Ilaiyaraaja	Vaali	
Agni Natchathiram	201	"Vaa Vaa Anbe Anbe"	Ilaiyaraaja	Vaali	K. J. Yesudas
Adimai Vilangu	202	"Nelave Ippa"	Sampath-Selvam		
Annanagar Mudhal Theru	203	"Ennai Kathai"(Female)	Chandrabose		
Annanagar Mudhal Theru	204	"Medhuva Medhuva"	Chandrabose		
Aval Mella Sirithal	205	"Medai Meedu Aadum"	Gangai Amaran		
Aval Mella Sirithal	206	"Aavaram Poovatha"	Gangai Amaran		
Aval Mella Sirithal	207	"Thegam Yengum"	Gangai Amaran		
Dharmathin Thalaivan	208	"Muthamizh Kaviyae"	Ilaiyaraaja		
Dharmathin Thalaivan	209	"Velli Mani Kinnathiley"	Ilaiyaraaja		
Dhayam Onnu	210	"Kotti Kidakku"	Ilaiyaraaja		
Dhayam Onnu	211	"Naane Un Kaathali"	Ilaiyaraaja		
Dhayam Onnu	212	"Pogathey Saaru"	Ilaiyaraaja		
En Bommukutty Ammavukku	213	"Chitra Chittugal"	Ilaiyaraaja		
En Bommukutty Ammavukku	214	"Kuyile Kuyile"(Duet)	Ilaiyaraaja		
En Bommukutty Ammavukku	215	"Kuyile Kuyile"(Female)	Ilaiyaraaja		
En Bommukutty Ammavukku	216	"Nallorgal Unnai"	Ilaiyaraaja		
En Bommukutty Ammavukku	217	"Uyire Uyirin"	Ilaiyaraaja		
En Bommukutty Ammavukku	218	"Yaiyaiya Yaiyaiya"	Ilaiyaraaja		
En Thamizh En Makkal	219	"Aarambichu"	Gangai Amaran		
En Thangachi Padichava	220	"Sondha Somaya Thooki Thooki"	Gangai Amaran		
En Thangai Kalyani	221	"Degam Suduguthu Vaadi"	T. Rajendar		
En Thangai Kalyani	222	"Ellaame En Thangachi"	T. Rajendar		
En Thangai Kalyani	223	"Thanandhani Kaatukulla"	T. Rajendar		
En Uyir Kannamma	224	"Salangai Satham"	Ilaiyaraaja		
En Uyir Kannamma	225	"Mathalam Kotta"	Ilaiyaraaja		
En Uyir Kannamma	226	"Yaarai Keattu"	Ilaiyaraaja		
En Vazhi Thani Vazhi	227	"Kadhal Paravai"	Chandrabose		
En Vazhi Thani Vazhi	228	"Pillai Pookkal"	Chandrabose		
Ennai Vittu Pogaathe	229	"Valaattum"	Ilaiyaraaja		
Ganam Courtar Avargale	230	"Motta"	Devendran		
Ganam Courtar Avargale	231	"Kadal Kavidai"	Devendran		
Ganam Courtar Avargale	232	"Aasaikku Pooja"	Devendran		
Guru Sishyan	233	"Vaa Vaa Vanji"	Ilaiyaraaja		
Guru Sishyan	234	"Jingidi Jingidi"	Ilaiyaraaja		
Idhaya Devathai	235	"En Idhayam"	K. V. Mahadevan		
Idhaya Devathai	236	"Vai Kilinja"	K. V. Mahadevan		
Idhaya Devathai	237	"Ennodu Sruthi"	K. V. Mahadevan		
Idhaya Devathai	238	"Evan Idhi Viduthana"	K. V. Mahadevan		
Idhaya Devathai	239	"Kiligal"	K. V. Mahadevan		
Idhu Namma Aalu	240	"Ammadi Idhu Thaan Kadhala"	K. Bhagyaraj		
Illam	241	"Manjal Nilla"	Ilaiyaraaja		
Irandil Ondru	242	"Naarinil Poo Thoduthu"	Ilaiyaraaja		
Irandil Ondru	243	"Sangeetha Poo"	Ilaiyaraaja		
Irandil Ondru	244	"Oru Vetti Vanthu"	Ilaiyaraaja		
Irandil Ondru	245	"Kadhalukku Thoothu"	Ilaiyaraaja		
Ithu Engal Neethi	246	"Padithen Padithen"	Ilaiyaraaja		
Ithu Engal Neethi	247	"Puthusaali Raaja"	Ilaiyaraaja		
Ithu Engal Neethi	248	"Unnattam Pillai"	Ilaiyaraaja		
Jeeva	249	"Hero Vandhachu"	Gangai Amaran		
Jeeva	250	"Pattuvanna Rosa"	Gangai Amaran		
Kadarkarai Thaagam	251	"O My Darling"	Chandrabose		
Kaliyugam	252	"Ilanguyil Paadutho"	Chandrabose		
Kalyana Paravaigal	253	"Alli Poova"	Rajan & Rajan		
Kan Simittum Neram	254	"Mamanthan"	V. S. Narasimman		
Kan Simittum Neram	255	"Vizhigalil Kodi Abinayam"	V. S. Narasimman		
Kodi Parakuthu	256	"Annai Madiyil"(Female)	Hamsalekha		
Kodi Parakuthu	257	"Oh Kadhal Ennai"	Hamsalekha		
Kodi Parakuthu	258	"Selai Mattum"	Hamsalekha		
Kodi Parakuthu	259	"Thondaikkulle"	Hamsalekha		
Kovil Mani Osai	260	"Odapatti Pichamuthu"	Gangai Amaran		
Kovil Mani Osai	261	"Pulla Pulla Vayasu Pulla"	Gangai Amaran		
Kovil Mani Osai	262	"Gala Gala Galavena"	Gangai Amaran		
Kovil Mani Osai	263	"Koora Podavakatti"	Gangai Amaran		
Kunguma Kodu	264	"Thamarai Poovithazh"	S. A. Rajkumar		
Kunguma Kodu	265	"Vaanam Kotuthu Veliye"	S. A. Rajkumar		
Kunguma Kodu	266	"Thendral Adikuthu"	S. A. Rajkumar		
Maappillai Sir	267	"Daddy Daddy"	Shankar–Ganesh		
Maappillai Sir	268	"Pattuppoovai"	Shankar–Ganesh		
Manamagale Vaa	269	"Ponmaanai"	Ilaiyaraaja		
Manamagale Vaa	270	"Thanniye"	Ilaiyaraaja		
Manasukkul Mathappu	271	"Poonthendrale"	S. A. Rajkumar		
Melam Kottu Thali Kattu	272	"Kattimelam Kotta Venum"	Premasiri Khemadasa		
Nallavan	273	"Mellam Kotti"	Chandrabose		
Nallavan	274	"Vaanmegam"	Chandrabose		
Nethiyadi	275	"Kookkuvena Koovum"	Pandiarajan		
Oomai Kuyil	276	"Poo Mudikanum"	Chandrabose		
Oomai Kuyil	277	"Yen Rasathi Nee"	Chandrabose		
Oruvar Vaazhum Aalayam	278	"Malaiyoram Mayile"	Ilaiyaraaja		
Paadatha Thenikkal	279	"Vanna Nilave"	Ilaiyaraaja		
Paarthal Pasu	280	"En Rasa Yaro"	Ilaiyaraaja		
Paarthal Pasu	281	"Aadai Maatra"	Ilaiyaraaja		
Paasa Paravaigal	282	"Thenpandi Thamizhe En"	Ilaiyaraaja		
Paatti Sollai Thattathe	283	"Vannathi Poochi"	Chandrabose		
Paatti Sollai Thattathe	284	"Vethala Madichi"(Version l)	Chandrabose		
Paatti Sollai Thattathe	285	"Vethala Madichi"(Version ll)	Chandrabose		
Pattikaatu Thambi	286	"Nandoorudhu Nariyoorudhu"	Chandrabose		
Poonthotta Kaavalkaaran	287	"Paramal Paartha Nenjam"	Ilaiyaraaja		Mano
Poonthotta Kaavalkaaran	288	"En Uyire Va"	Ilaiyaraaja		
Poovizhi Raja	289	"Eerachelai"	Yuvaraj		
Poovizhi Raja	290	"Oh Nenjodu Raagam"	Yuvaraj		
Poovukkul Boogambam	291	"Naal Varuthu"	S. P. Venkatesh		
Poovukkul Boogambam	292	"Thethi Sollattuma"	S. P. Venkatesh		
Poovum Puyalum	293	"Eruthe"	S. A. Rajkumar		
Puthiya Vaanam	294	"Raakuyile"	Hamsalekha		
Raasave Unnai Nambi	295	"Kaalai Nera Raagamey"	Ilaiyaraaja		
Raasave Unnai Nambi	296	"Kamma Kara Yoram"	Ilaiyaraaja		
Raththa Dhanam	297	"Neelu Konam"	Gangai Amaran		
Rayilukku Neramachu	298	"Raaj Nagam"	S. A. Rajkumar		
Rendum Rendum Anju	299	"Ethukkum Oru Neram"	Gangai Amaran		
Rendum Rendum Anju	300	"Ganak Karunguyile"	Gangai Amaran		
Rendum Rendum Anju	301	"Penneer Poovin"	Gangai Amaran		
Sakkarai Panthal	302	"Urummunnu Urumuthadi"	Ilaiyaraaja		
Senthoora Poove	303	"Chinna Kannan"	Manoj Gyan		
Shenbagamae Shenbagamae	304	"Saami En Thaali"	Ilaiyaraaja		
Sigappu Thali	305	"Oda Thani Uppu Thani"	Shankar–Ganesh		
Soora Samhaaram	306	"Naan Enbathu"	Ilaiyaraaja		
Soora Samhaaram	307	"Neela Kuyile"	Ilaiyaraaja		
Sudhanthira Naattin Adimaigal	308	"Ponno Maniyo"	M. S. Viswanathan		
Sudhanthira Naattin Adimaigal	309	"En Annai Desamey"	M. S. Viswanathan		
Thaai Paasam	310	"Neeye Neeye Neeye"	Chandrabose		
Thaai Paasam	311	"Othaiyila Nikkuriye"	Chandrabose		
Thaimel Aanai	312	"Chinna Kanna"(Version l)	Chandrabose		
Thaimel Aanai	313	"Chinna Kanna"(Version ll)	Chandrabose		
Thambi Thanga Kambi	314	"Sri Ranjani"	Gangai Amaran		
Thambi Thanga Kambi	315	"Aaiyram Thalaimurai"	Gangai Amaran		
Thanga Kalasam	316	"Thamaraielayil"	M. S. Viswanathan		S. P. Balasubrahmanyam
Thanga Kalasam	317	"Engum Inbham"	M. S. Viswanathan		P. Jayachandran
Thanga Kalasam	318	"Thamizhgnana"	M. S. Viswanathan		K. J. Yesudas
Thanga Kalasam	319	"Kaalamenum Kadalinile"	M. S. Viswanathan		
Thanga Kalasam	320	"Kanniyaval Naanukiraal"	M. S. Viswanathan		K. J. Yesudas
Thappu Kanakku	321	"Oru Poovai Pondra"	M. S. Viswanathan		
Thenpandi Seemaiyile	322	"Ae Rajadhi"	K. Bhagyaraj		
Thenpandi Seemaiyile	323	"Ae Machan"	K. Bhagyaraj		
Therkathi Kallan	324	"Inthiran Ketahu"	Ilaiyaraaja		
Therkathi Kallan	325	"Pottu Vachu Pokkuporen"	Ilaiyaraaja		
Therkathi Kallan	326	"Thilla Thaangu"	Ilaiyaraaja		
Unnal Mudiyum Thambi	327	"Ithazhil Kathai"	Ilaiyaraaja		S. P. Balasubrahmanyam
Unnal Mudiyum Thambi	328	"Enna Samayalo"	Ilaiyaraaja		
Urimai Geetham	329	"Ponmaanney"	Manoj Gyan		S. P. Balasubrahmanyam
Uzhaithu Vaazha Vendum	330	"Muthukkal Pathikkatha"	Devendran		
Uzhaithu Vaazha Vendum	331	"Ponmangani"	Devendran		
Vasanthi	332	"Santhosham"(Version ll)	Chandrabose		
Vasanthi	333	"Ravivarman"	Chandrabose		
Kathal Geetham	334	"Sonthakkara"(Version l)	Ilaiyaraaja		
Kathal Geetham	335	"Manjal Andhi"	Ilaiyaraaja		
Kathal Geetham	336	"Kankaniley"	Ilaiyaraaja		
Kathal Geetham	337	"Sonthakkara"(Version ll)	Ilaiyaraaja		
Thirutha Mudiyatha Theerpu	338	"Nenjame Thulluthey"	Satyam	Vairamuthu	S. P. Balasubrahmanyam
Thirutha Mudiyatha Theerpu	339	"Nithila Poove Thookamum"	Satyam	Vairamuthu	
Thirutha Mudiyatha Theerpu	340	"Evans Manmatha"	Satyam	Vairamuthu	

=== 1989 ===
Film	No	Song	Composer(s)	Writer(s)	Co-artist(s)
Aararo Aariraro	341	"Odappakkam Oru Kuruvi"	K. Bhagyaraj		
Anbu Chinnam	342	"Ippo Ippo"	Ilaiyaraaja		
Anbu Chinnam	343	"Aathadi Etho"	Ilaiyaraaja		
Anbu Kattalai	344	"Ponmaaney Ponmaaney"	Ilaiyaraaja		
Anbu Kattalai	345	"Vethalai Vethalai"	Ilaiyaraaja		
Andru Peytha Mazhaiyil	346	"Cukko Cukko"	Thayanban		
Annakili Sonna Kathai	347	"Kanmaniye"	Chandrabose		
Annanukku Jai	348	"Solai Ilanguyile"	Ilaiyaraaja		
Athaimadi Methaiadi	349	"I Love You"	SR Vasu		
Chinna Chinna Aasaigal	350	"Ilayavale"	Chandrabose		
Chinnappadass	351	"Vaanam Thodatha"	Ilaiyaraaja		
Chinnappadass	352	"Pakku Vethalai"	Ilaiyaraaja		
Chinnappadass	353	"Paadum Baktha Meera"	Ilaiyaraaja		
Chinnappadass	354	"Athi Ithu Ethu"	Ilaiyaraaja		
Dharma Devan	355	"Yedho Gnabagam"	Gangai Amaran		
Dharma Devan	356	"Kannumilla Kadhumilla"	Gangai Amaran		
Dharma Devan	357	"Dharma Devan Koyilil"	Gangai Amaran		
Dharmam Vellum	358	"Devi Devi"	Ilaiyaraaja		
Dharmam Vellum	359	"Mappile Sella"	Ilaiyaraaja		
Dilli Babu	360	"Pu Oda Addatha Kathu"	Gangai Amaran		
Dilli Babu	361	"Kathalisa Intha Dilli"	Gangai Amaran		
Dilli Babu	362	"Koora Pudavai Onnu"	Gangai Amaran		
Ellame En Thangachi	363	"Vaanampaadi Paadum Neram"	Gangai Amaran		
Ellame En Thangachi	364	"Enna Maamanu Sonna Enna"	Gangai Amaran		
En Kanavar	365	"Yenthan Ennodu"(Version l)	S. P. Venkatesh		
En Kanavar	366	"Vedan Thedum"	S. P. Venkatesh		
En Kanavar	367	"Yenthan Ennodu"(Version ll)	S. P. Venkatesh		
En Kanavar	368	"Netru Paarthado"	S. P. Venkatesh		
En Rathathin Rathame	369	"Indha Raagamum"	Shankar–Ganesh		
En Thangai	370	"Hey Beauty"	S. A. Rajkumar		
En Thangai	371	"Appan"	S. A. Rajkumar		
En Thangai	372	"Poovukkulle"	S. A. Rajkumar		
Enga Ooru Mappillai	373	"Vaanathula Velli"	Ilaiyaraaja		
Enga Ooru Mappillai	374	"En Kaveriye"	Ilaiyaraaja		
Enga Ooru Mappillai	375	"Kodupatha"	Ilaiyaraaja		
Enne Petha Raasa	376	"Sondham Ondrai"	Ilaiyaraaja		
Idhayathai Thirudathe	377	"Oh Priya Priya"	Ilaiyaraaja		
Idhayathai Thirudathe	378	"Kaattukulle Paatu Sollum"	Ilaiyaraaja		
Idhayathai Thirudathe	379	"Aththadi Ammadi"	Ilaiyaraaja		
Indhiran Chandhiran	380	"College Degreeyum"	Ilaiyaraaja		
Indhiran Chandhiran	381	"Nooru Nooru Mutham"	Ilaiyaraaja		
Indhiran Chandhiran	382	"Kadhal Ragamum"	Ilaiyaraaja		
Idhayathil Oru Udhayam	383	"En Alli Rani"	Hamsalekha		
Idhayathil Oru Udhayam	384	"Manmatha Banam"	Hamsalekha		
Idhayathil Oru Udhayam	385	"Naan Vanthen"	Hamsalekha		
Idhayathil Oru Udhayam	386	"O Penmani Kanmani"	Hamsalekha		
Idhaya Deepam	387	"Enakoru Devan"	Chandrabose		
Idhaya Deepam	388	"Thudipadhu Jeevan"	Chandrabose		
Idhu Unga Kudumbam	389	"Vetri Murasu"	Hamsalekha		
Idhu Unga Kudumbam	390	"Muthuswamy"	Hamsalekha		
Idhu Unga Kudumbam	391	"Ambalaikku Nenjil'	Hamsalekha		
Idhu Unga Kudumbam	392	"Naanamo"	Hamsalekha		
Kaaval Poonaigal	393	"Raagam Padave"(Female)	Sangeetha Rajan		
Kaaval Poonaigal	394	"Rasanaiya Raasa"	Sangeetha Rajan		
Kaaval Poonaigal	395	"Raagam Padave"(Child)	Sangeetha Rajan		
Kadhal Enum Nadhiyinile	396	"Kanna Vazhga"	Manoj Gyan		
Kadhal Enum Nadhiyinile	397	"Ullam Ullam"	Manoj Gyan		
Kadhal Enum Nadhiyinile	398	"Kanbathu Kanava"	Manoj Gyan		
Kaadhal Oru Kavithai	399	"Kaadhal Piththu"(Solo)	Raamlaxman		
Kaadhal Oru Kavithai	400	"Kaalam Thorum Kadhal Seiga"	Raamlaxman		
Kaadhal Oru Kavithai	401	"En Thoothu Sel Sel"	Raamlaxman		
Kaadhal Oru Kavithai	402	"Kanne Kaaman"	Raamlaxman		
Kaadhal Oru Kavithai	403	"Ezhunthada Naaththu"	Raamlaxman		
Kaadhal Oru Kavithai	404	"Kaadhal Piththu"(Duet)	Raamlaxman		
Kaadhal Oru Kavithai	405	"Manjal Thangame"	Raamlaxman		
Kaadhal Oru Kavithai	406	"Poonkili Neeyo"	Raamlaxman		
Kai Veesamma Kai Veesu	407	"Anbedhaan"	Ilaiyaraaja		
Kai Veesamma Kai Veesu	408	"Yeruthey"	Ilaiyaraaja		
Karakattakkaran	409	"Indha Maan"	Ilaiyaraaja		
Karakattakkaran	410	"Kudagu Malai"	Ilaiyaraaja		
Karakattakkaran	411	"Mariyamma Mariyamma"	Ilaiyaraaja		
Karakattakkaran	412	"Mundhi Mundhi"	Ilaiyaraaja		
Kuttravali	413	"Vaazhthu Sollungal"	Chandrabose		
Manasukketha Maharasa	414	"Mugamoru Nila"	Deva		
Manidhan Marivittan	415	"Idi Idichu"	Shankar–Ganesh		
Moodu Manthiram	416	"Vizhiyoram"	Shankar–Ganesh		
Naalai Manithan	417	"Sangamathil Sangamein"	Premi-Sreeni		
Ninaivu Chinnam	418	"Vaikasi Masthula"	Ilaiyaraaja		
Ninaivu Chinnam	419	"Oorukulla Unna"	Ilaiyaraaja		
Nyaya Tharasu	420	"Kalyana Penn Pola"	Shankar–Ganesh		
Ore Oru Gramathiley	421	"Rettaikiligal"	Ilaiyaraaja		
Ore Oru Gramathiley	422	"Nallathor Veenai"	Ilaiyaraaja		
Orey Thaai Orey Kulam	423	"Then Pondi"	K. V. Mahadevan		
Oru Ponnu Nenacha	424	"Takkar Adikuthu"	S. A. Rajkumar		
Oru Ponnu Nenacha	425	"Anandha Geethangal"	S. A. Rajkumar		
Paandi Nattu Thangam	426	"Ilam Vayasu Ponna"	Ilaiyaraaja		
Paandi Nattu Thangam	427	"Mayilaadum"	Ilaiyaraaja		
Paandi Nattu Thangam	428	"Siru Koottile Ulla"	Ilaiyaraaja		
Paandi Nattu Thangam	429	"Unn Manasile"(Version l)	Ilaiyaraaja		
Paandi Nattu Thangam	430	"Unn Manasile"(Version ll)	Ilaiyaraaja		
Paasa Mazhai	431	"Aayiram Poovum Undu"	Ilaiyaraaja		
Paasa Mazhai	432	"Anna Nadai Podum"	Ilaiyaraaja		
Paattukku Oru Thalaivan	433	"Azhagiya Nadhi Enna"	Ilaiyaraaja		
Paattukku Oru Thalaivan	434	"Isaiyile Naan Vasamaaginen"	Ilaiyaraaja		
Padicha Pulla	435	"Poongaatre"(Version l)	Ilaiyaraaja		
Pick Pocket	436	"Kadhal Thiruda"	Ilaiyaraaja		
Pick Pocket	437	"Manja Kuruvi"	Ilaiyaraaja		
Pick Pocket	438	"Poovum"	Ilaiyaraaja		
Paasakanal	439	"Therkupurama"(Female)	S. A. Rajkumar		
Pillaikkaga	440	"Iniya Vasanthame"	Gangai Amaran		
Pillaikkaga	441	"Mazhalayin"	Gangai Amaran		
Pillaikkaga	442	"Thaye Unnidam"	Gangai Amaran		
Pongi Varum Kaveri	443	"Velli Golusu"	Ilaiyaraaja		
Pongi Varum Kaveri	444	"Dhinamum Sirichi"	Ilaiyaraaja		
Ponmana Selvan	445	"Adichen"	Ilaiyaraaja		
Ponmana Selvan	446	"Kana Karunguyile"	Ilaiyaraaja		
Ponmana Selvan	447	"Nee Pottu Vacha"	Ilaiyaraaja		
Ponnu Pakka Poren	448	"Aalana Naala"	K. Bhagyaraj		
Ponnu Pakka Poren	449	"Sala Sala Yena"	K. Bhagyaraj		
Poo Manam	450	"En Anbe En Nanjil"	Vidyasagar		
Poo Manam	451	"Paatukoduthaadhu"	Vidyasagar		
Poruthathu Pothum	452	"Eley Tamizha"	Ilaiyaraaja		
Poruthathu Pothum	453	"Rathiri Thookkam Kettu"	Ilaiyaraaja		
Pudhu Mappillai	454	"Ullukul Ullathu Ellam Ungaluku"	Gangai Amaran		
Pudhu Pudhu Arthangal	455	"Guruvayurappa"	Ilaiyaraaja		
Raaja Raajathan	456	"Innum Enna"	Ilaiyaraaja		
Raaja Raajathan	457	"Mamarathu Kuyilu"	Ilaiyaraaja		
Radha Kadal Varaatha	458	"Therkku Thesa Kaththu"	K Kamalarajan		
Radha Kadal Varaatha	459	"Entha Eru Vizhigalil"	K Kamalarajan		
Rajadhi Raja	460	"Meenamma Meenamma"	Ilaiyaraaja		
Rajadhi Raja	461	"Enkitta Modhadhe"	Ilaiyaraaja		
Rajadhi Raja	462	"In Nenja Thottu Sollu"	Ilaiyaraaja		
Rajanadai	463	"Kasthuri Maankutti"(Female)	M. S. Viswanathan		
Rajanadai	464	"Kasthuri Maankutti"(Duet)	M. S. Viswanathan		
Rasathi Kalyanam	465	"Raajathi Ennai Thedi"	M. S. Viswanathan		
Rasathi Kalyanam	466	"Nee Mathanittadhdum"	M. S. Viswanathan		
Samsara Sangeetham	467	"Noolu Illa Oosiyila"	T. Rajendar		
Samsarame Saranam	468	"Unavu Sellavillai"(Female)	Gangai Amaran		
Samsarame Saranam	469	"Unavu Sellavillai"(Sad)	Gangai Amaran		
Sangu Pushpangal	470	"Kannukkul Deepam Yenthi"	Guna Singh		
Sattathin Thirappu Vizhaa	471	"Oh Vennila"	Shankar–Ganesh		
Siva	472	"Adi Vaanmathi"	Ilaiyaraaja		
Siva	473	"Iruvizhiyin"	Ilaiyaraaja		
Siva	474	"Velli Kizhama"	Ilaiyaraaja		
Sondham 16	475	"Adi Kudhira Irukku"	Shankar–Ganesh		
Solaikuyil	476	"Poongatre Kelayo"	MS Murari		
Solaikuyil	477	"Malat Naattu Maochan"	MS Murari		
Thalaippu Seithigal	478	"Mutham Ondru"	Shyam		
Thalaippu Seithigal	479	"Varum Aavani"	Shyam		
Thangamana Raasa	480	"Kanne En Karmugile"	Ilaiyaraaja		
Thangamana Raasa	481	"Thenmadurai Seemaiyile"	Ilaiyaraaja		
Thangamani Rangamani	482	"Sembaruthi"	Shankar–Ganesh		
Thendral Sudum	483	"Kannama Kannama"	Ilaiyaraaja		
Thiruppu Munai	484	"Adi Ye Pulla"	Ilaiyaraaja		
Thiruppu Munai	485	"Ilamai Ithu"	Ilaiyaraaja		
Thiruppu Munai	486	"Oru Naal"	Ilaiyaraaja		
Udhayam	487	"Achacho Penmai"	Ilaiyaraaja		
Udhayam	488	"Aadalgalo Paadalgalo"	Ilaiyaraaja		
Udhayam	489	"Kiss Me"	Ilaiyaraaja		
Udhayam	490	"Idhu Neeyum"	Ilaiyaraaja		
Uthama Purushan	491	"Suriya Dhaagangal"	Shankar–Ganesh		
Uthama Purushan	492	"Thaai Paadinal"	Shankar–Ganesh		
Vaathiyaar Veettu Pillai	493	"Chikkunnu Irukku"	Ilaiyaraaja		
Valudhu Kalai Vaithu Vaa	494	"Kannanavan Sonnathellam"	M. S. Viswanathan		
Varusham Padhinaaru	495	"Hey Aiyasamy"	Ilaiyaraaja		
Varusham Padhinaaru	496	"Karayatha Manamum"	Ilaiyaraaja		
Vetrimel Vetri	497	"Kannanaa Kaann Maniye"	Gangai Amaran		
Vetri Vizha	498	"Marugo Marugo"	Ilaiyaraaja		
Vetri Vizha	499	"Pungatru Un Peru Solla"	Ilaiyaraaja		
Vizhiyora Kavithaigal	500	"Pudhiya Nilavin"	Shankar–Ganesh		
Yogam Rajayogam	501	"Rathiri Nadu Rathiri"	Shankar–Ganesh		
Yogam Rajayogam	502	"Gokulam Gopiyan"	Shankar–Ganesh		

=== 1990 ===
Film	No	Song	Composer(s)	Writer(s)	Co-artist(s)
Idhaya Thamarai	503	"Oru Kadhal Devadhai"	Shankar–Ganesh		
Idhaya Thamarai	504	"Kanne Kadhavu Therandhidum"	Shankar–Ganesh		
Kavalukku Kettikaran	505	"Solai Ilangkuil"	Ilaiyaraaja		
Panakkaran	506	"Ding Dang Dang"	Ilaiyaraaja		
Aadi Velli	507	"Vanna Vizhiyazhagi"	Shankar–Ganesh		
Pattikattan	508	"Enghe Vachhen"	Shankar–Ganesh		
Pattikattan	509	"Yethanal Kavaichi"	Shankar–Ganesh		
Pattikattan	510	"Padithan Oru Paattu"	Shankar–Ganesh		
Vaazhkai Chakkaram	511	"Vizhiye Vizhiye Kaditham"	Shankar–Ganesh		
Vaazhkai Chakkaram	512	"Aathankarai Oram"	Shankar–Ganesh		
En Uyir Thozhan	513	"Machchi Mannaaru"	Ilaiyaraaja		
En Uyir Thozhan	514	"Kuyilukuppam"	Ilaiyaraaja		
Paattali Magan	515	"Thoppukkulle Kuruvi"	S. P. Venkatesh		
Paattali Magan	516	"Naattaama Ponnu"	S. P. Venkatesh		
Paattali Magan	517	"Themmangu"	S. P. Venkatesh		
Salem Vishnu	518	"Hey Nanaa Vayasu Pulla"	S. P. Venkatesh		
Arangetra Velai	519	"Maamanukkum"	Ilaiyaraaja		
Paattukku Naan Adimai	520	"Poove Poove"	Ilaiyaraaja		
Paattukku Naan Adimai	521	"Paattukku Jodiya"	Ilaiyaraaja		
Valiba Vizhayattu	522	"Anname Anname"	Shankar–Ganesh		
Pengal Veettin Kanngal	523	"Pagalalla Ithu Pagalalla"	Shankar–Ganesh		
Kavithai Paadum Alaigal	524	"Kaatrum Poovum"	Ilaiyaraaja		
Kavithai Paadum Alaigal	525	"Kanney Enn Kanmaniye"	Ilaiyaraaja		
Kavithai Paadum Alaigal	526	"Saamiya Vendikittu"	Ilaiyaraaja		
Kavithai Paadum Alaigal	527	"Unnai Kaanamal"	Ilaiyaraaja		
Kavithai Paadum Alaigal	528	"Vaan Nila"	Ilaiyaraaja		
Vetri Malai	529	"Kannikkazhagae"	Shankar–Ganesh		
Jagathalaprathapan	530	"Moru Dhaana"	Shankar–Ganesh		
Jagathalaprathapan	531	"Naandhaane Engugiraen"	Shankar–Ganesh		
Jagathalaprathapan	532	"Pulli Maane"	Shankar–Ganesh		
Manaivi Oru Manickam	533	"Kumguma Nayagi"	Shankar–Ganesh		
Manaivi Oru Manickam	534	"Nathan Mudimele"	Shankar–Ganesh		
Manaivi Oru Manickam	535	"Poojai Neram"	Shankar–Ganesh		
Unnai Solli Kutramillai	536	"Sorkathin Vasapadi"	Ilaiyaraaja		
Kalyana Rasi	537	"Aayiram Thalamurai"	Manoj Gyan		
Kalyana Rasi	538	"Idhu Veyiladikkum"	Manoj Gyan		
Kalyana Rasi	539	"Kanniponnu"	Manoj Gyan		
Kalyana Rasi	540	"Pathinettu Vayadhu"	Manoj Gyan		
Pondatti Thevai	541	"Aararo Paada"	Ilaiyaraaja		
Pondatti Thevai	542	"Thottavudan"	Ilaiyaraaja		
Pudhu Padagan	543	"Adhikaalai Naan Paadum"	S. Thanu		
Pudhu Padagan	544	"Malaiya Kondainju"	S. Thanu		
Pudhu Vasantham	545	"Aayiram Thirnaal"	S. A. Rajkumar		
Pudhu Vasantham	546	"Vaarungal Vaarungal"	S. A. Rajkumar		
Seetha	547	"Aararo Aariraro"	Vidyasagar		
Seetha	548	"Neram Kaalam"	Vidyasagar		
Seetha	549	"Vidai Ariya"	Vidyasagar		
Seetha	550	"Thene Thene"	Vidyasagar		
Silambu	551	"Unna Paatha"	M. S. Viswanathan		
Silambu	552	"Kaaluku Keezhe"	M. S. Viswanathan		
Thangathin Thangam	553	"Sevandhipoo Maalakattu"	S. A. Rajkumar		
Sakthi Parasakthi	554	"Madhurai Meenal"	Shankar–Ganesh		
Pagalil Pournami	555	"Poothendralum"	Ilaiyaraaja		
Pagalil Pournami	556	"Karaiyora Katru"	Ilaiyaraaja		
Periya Veetu Pannakkaran	557	"Malligaiye Malligaiye"	Ilaiyaraaja		
Periya Veetu Pannakkaran	558	"Nikkattumaa Pogattuma"	Ilaiyaraaja		
Neengalum Herothan	559	"Rathirikku Thookkam"	Shankar–Ganesh		
Neengalum Herothan	560	"Yezhulagam Aandu Varum"	Shankar–Ganesh		
Nyayangal Jayikkattum	561	"Yaanaikatti"	Shankar–Ganesh		
Nyayangal Jayikkattum	562	"Pudhumugam Poomugam"	Shankar–Ganesh		
Sandhana Kaatru	563	"Oh Thendrale"(Female)	Shankar–Ganesh		
Sandhana Kaatru	564	"Raavu Neram"	Shankar–Ganesh		
Pathimoonam Number Veedu	565	"Kandathu Ellam Mayyama"	Sangeetha Rajan		
Athisaya Piravi	566	"Paattukku Paattu"	Ilaiyaraaja		
Athisaya Piravi	567	"Unna Partha"	Ilaiyaraaja		
Mounam Sammadham	568	"Chic Chic Cha"	Ilaiyaraaja		
Mounam Sammadham	569	"Kalyaana Thaen Nilaa"	Ilaiyaraaja		
Mounam Sammadham	570	"Oru Raja Vanthan"	Ilaiyaraaja		
Mounam Sammadham	571	"Thithithamsidu"	Ilaiyaraaja		
Madurai Veeran Enga Saami	572	"Thangame"	Ilaiyaraaja		
Vedikkai En Vadikkai	573	"Jayathi Jayathi"	Shankar–Ganesh		
Nila Pennae	574	"Kichang Kichang"	Vidyasagar		
Nila Pennae	575	"Manasukku Vayasenna"	Vidyasagar		
Nila Pennae	576	"Raathiri Mella"(Version l)	Vidyasagar		
Nila Pennae	577	"Raathiri Mella"(Version ll)	Vidyasagar		
Kizhakku Vaasal	578	"Vanthathe O Kungumam"	Ilaiyaraaja		
Naanum Indha Ooruthan	579	"Ponnusirikidu Poovatama"	Shankar–Ganesh		
Naanum Indha Ooruthan	580	"Vaasal"	Shankar–Ganesh		
Ooru Vittu Ooru Vanthu	581	"Chingu Chaa Chaa Chingu"	Ilaiyaraaja		
Sirayil Pootha Chinna Malar	582	"Adhisaya Nadamidum"	Ilaiyaraaja		
Sirayil Pootha Chinna Malar	583	"Ethanai Per Unnai"	Ilaiyaraaja		
Sirayil Pootha Chinna Malar	584	"Vachaan Vachaan"	Ilaiyaraaja		
Keladi Kanmani	585	"Thendral Thaan"	Ilaiyaraaja		
Aarathi Edungadi	586	"Magarasi"	Shankar–Ganesh		
Aarathi Edungadi	587	"Maman Adicharo"	Shankar–Ganesh		
Durga	588	"Aadi Varum Paadi Varum"	Shankar–Ganesh		
Velai Kidaichuduchu	589	"Iyere Iyere"	Hamsalekha		
Velai Kidaichuduchu	590	"Nooraandu"	Hamsalekha		
Velai Kidaichuduchu	591	"Setthukulla"	Hamsalekha		
Velai Kidaichuduchu	592	"Vaasi Nadaswaram"	Hamsalekha		
My Dear Marthandan	593	"Satham Varamal"	Ilaiyaraaja		
Thalattu Padava	594	"Odai Kuyil"	Ilaiyaraaja		
Engitta Mothathay	595	"Kai Veesamma Kai Veesu"	Ilaiyaraaja		
Palaivana Paravaigal	596	"Saamy"	Ilayagangai		
Arubathu Naal Arubathu Nimidham	597	"Engum Un Mugam"	Kannan		
Arubathu Naal Arubathu Nimidham	598	"Pon Vaname En Ganame"	Kannan		
Amman Kovil Thiruvizha	599	"Madhuran Oyilattam"	Ilaiyaraaja		
Amman Kovil Thiruvizha	600	"Desamuthu"	Ilaiyaraaja		
En Kadhal Kanmani	601	"Ennai Vittu"	L. Vaidyanathan		
En Kadhal Kanmani	602	"Inru Dhan"	L. Vaidyanathan		
En Kadhal Kanmani	603	"Ayyakkannu"	L. Vaidyanathan		
Mallu Vetti Minor	604	"Adi Mattalam"	Ilaiyaraaja		
Mallu Vetti Minor	605	"Chinna Mani"	Ilaiyaraaja		
Mallu Vetti Minor	606	"Jalakku Jalakku"	Ilaiyaraaja		
Michael Madana Kama Rajan	607	"Rum Bum Bum Aarabum"	Ilaiyaraaja		
Michael Madana Kama Rajan	608	"Siva Rathiri"	Ilaiyaraaja		
Michael Madana Kama Rajan	609	"Mathapoovu Oru Penna"	Ilaiyaraaja		
Michael Madana Kama Rajan	610	"Aadi Pattam Thedi"	Ilaiyaraaja		
Puthiya Kaatru	611	"Elam Thenraley"	Rajesh		
Puthu Paatu	612	"Nethu Oruthara"	Ilaiyaraaja		
Puthu Paatu	613	"Sontham Vandhadhu"	Ilaiyaraaja		
Puthu Paatu	614	"Thavamaa Thavamirunthu"	Ilaiyaraaja		
Puthu Paatu	615	"Vethala Paakku"	Ilaiyaraaja		
Puthu Paatu	616	"Kumbidum Kai"	Ilaiyaraaja		
Puthu Paatu	617	"Senjanthu"	Ilaiyaraaja		
Sirayil Sila Raagangal	618	"Kai Pidithu"	Ilaiyaraaja		
Sirayil Sila Raagangal	619	"Thendral Varum"	Ilaiyaraaja		
Vellaiya Thevan	620	"Uchi Malai"	Ilaiyaraaja		
Vellaiya Thevan	621	"Kaagam"	Ilaiyaraaja		
Vellaiya Thevan	622	"Akka Magalukku"	Ilaiyaraaja		
Pudhu Pudhu Ragangal	623	"Solli Koduthal"(Happy)	S. A. Rajkumar		
Pudhu Pudhu Ragangal	624	"Solli Koduthal"(Sad)	S. A. Rajkumar		
Pudhu Pudhu Ragangal	625	"Kottum Mazhai"	S. A. Rajkumar		
Pudhu Pudhu Ragangal	626	"Summa Keluga"	S. A. Rajkumar		
Vaigasi Poranthachu	627	"Chinna Ponnuthaan"	Deva		
Vaigasi Poranthachu	628	"Neela Kuyile"	Deva		
Vaigasi Poranthachu	629	"Aatha Un Kovililae"	Deva		
Aatha Naan Pass Ayittaen	630	"Kanaavil Partha"	Vidyasagar		
Aatha Naan Pass Ayittaen	631	"Moonu Mozha"	Vidyasagar		
Aerikarai Poongaatre	632	"Kodi Mullai"	M. S. Viswanathan		
Namma Ooru Poovatha	633	"Manjanathipoove"	Deva		
Namma Ooru Poovatha	634	"Maarapu Potta Pulla"	Deva		
Namma Ooru Poovatha	635	"Chinna Chinna Poove"	Deva		
Namma Ooru Poovatha	636	"Romba Naalaga Maama"	Deva		
Namma Ooru Poovatha	637	"Aavaram Poovu Onu"	Deva		
Sathya Vaakku	638	"Vaigai Nadhiyodum"	Manoj Gyan		
Sathya Vaakku	639	"Poovil Oru Vandu"	Manoj Gyan		
Thangaikku Oru Thalattu	640	"Sundhupaadum"	Shankar–Ganesh		
Nadigan	641	"Aadippattam Thedi"	Ilaiyaraaja		
Nadigan	642	"Adi Veluthu"	Ilaiyaraaja		
Urudhi Mozhi	643	"Neruppu Neruppu"	Ilaiyaraaja		
Raja Kaiya Vacha	644	"Mazhai Varuthu"	Ilaiyaraaja		
Nee Sirithaal Deepavali	645	"Sindhumani"(Duet)	Ilaiyaraaja		
Pudhiya Sarithiram	646	"Maana Madhurakkaraindi"	Vidyasagar		
Pudhiya Sarithiram	647	"O Anbe Anbe"	Vidyasagar		
Vaazhnthu Kaattuvom	648	"Aaduvom Paaduvom"	Shankar–Ganesh		
Vaazhnthu Kaattuvom	649	"Goyyapazham Venuma"	Shankar–Ganesh		
Vaazhnthu Kaattuvom	650	"Adamazhai Mele"	Shankar–Ganesh		
Avanga Namma Ooru Ponnunga	651	"Thulli Thulli"	Shankar–Ganesh		
Paadi Vaa Thendrale	652	"Vaa Vaa Anbe"	S. A. Rajkumar		
Mannukketha Maindan	653	"Kannil Aadum Nilave"	Deva		
Vaaliban	654	"Epa Sindha"	Ilaiyaraaja		
Vaaliban	655	"Kanyakumari"	Ilaiyaraaja		
Vaaliban	656	"Pappampatti"	Ilaiyaraaja		
Vaaliban	657	"Vendaanna Vidalai"	Ilaiyaraaja		
Kaadhal Devathai	658	"Sammatham"	Ilaiyaraaja		
Kaadhal Devathai	659	"Eduthu Thaa"	Ilaiyaraaja		
Thangamalai Thirudan	660	"Shree Anjaneyam"	Ilaiyaraaja		
Thangamalai Thirudan	661	"Ponne Anbana"	Ilaiyaraaja		
Thangamalai Thirudan	662	"Chammakku"	Ilaiyaraaja		
Thangamalai Thirudan	663	"Subhavelai Nallai"	Ilaiyaraaja		
Nalla Kaalam Porandaachu	664	"Kaalai Paartha"	Shankar–Ganesh		

=== 1991 ===
Film	No	Song	Composer(s)	Writer(s)	Co-artist(s)
Sami Potta Mudichu	665	"Ponneduthu Varen"	Ilaiyaraaja		Mano
Sami Potta Mudichu	666	"Kodaiyidi"	Ilaiyaraaja		
Sigaram	667	"Itho Itho En"	S. P. Balasubrahmanyam		
Sigaram	668	"Unnai Kanda"(Female)	S. P. Balasubrahmanyam		
Eeramana Rojave	669	"Vanna Poongavanam"	Ilaiyaraaja		
Kumbakarai Thangaiah	670	"Koodalooru Gundumalli"	Ilaiyaraaja		
Kumbakarai Thangaiah	671	"Kootathula Kuninchu"	Ilaiyaraaja		
Naadu Adhai Naadu	672	"Oru Kili Thozhilae"	Deva		
Perum Pulli	673	"Gangai Nadhi"	S. A. Rajkumar		
Perum Pulli	674	"Ilamaiyin Vizhigalil"	S. A. Rajkumar		
Thaiyalkaran	675	"Mai Mai Kannmai"	S. P. Balasubrahmanyam		
Theechati Govindhan	676	"Then Madhura Naatukatta"	Sangeetha Rajan		
Thai Poosam	677	"Vel Vel"	Shankar–Ganesh		
Thai Poosam	678	"Pachaikili Vachirukkum"	Shankar–Ganesh		
Vanakkam Vathiyare	679	"Mettu Onnu"	V. R. Sampath Selvan		
Namma Ooru Mariamma	680	"Sikkira Sirripula"	Shankar–Ganesh		
Nanbargal	681	"Achu Vellam Tharean Machinichiye"	Babul Bose		
Nanbargal	682	"Atheri Paacha Pachadhan"	Babul Bose		
Nanbargal	683	"Ennuyerea Ennuyerea"(Solo)	Babul Bose		
Nanbargal	684	"Ennuyerea Ennuyerea"(Duet)	Babul Bose		
Nanbargal	685	"Vellai Rojavea"	Babul Bose		
Sir I Love You	686	"Vaathiyaare Konjam"	Ilaiyaraaja		
Sir I Love You	687	"Vanam Paadi"	Ilaiyaraaja		
Aasai Kiliye Kobama	688	"Odura Nariyila Oru Nari"	S. A. Rajkumar		
Irumbu Pookkal	689	"Muththaana Muththam"	M. S. Viswanathan		
Naan Pudicha Mappillai	690	"Myna Myna Pakkathu Rani"	Chandrabose		
Annan Kaattiya Vazhi	691	"Manja Thuni"	S. A. Rajkumar		
Annan Kaattiya Vazhi	692	"Uyaare Uyya"	S. A. Rajkumar		
Annan Kaattiya Vazhi	693	"Vaa Uyire Indha"	S. A. Rajkumar		
Pudhu Nellu Pudhu Naathu	694	"Hey Marikozhundhu"	Ilaiyaraaja		
Vetri Karangal	695	"Unnaala Thoongala"	Ilaiyaraaja		
Apoorva Naagam	696	"Enganaagam"	Shankar–Ganesh		
Apoorva Naagam	697	"Nallavalayanu"	Shankar–Ganesh		
Apoorva Naagam	698	"Raasave Enpaata"	Shankar–Ganesh		
Apoorva Naagam	699	"Kalyaanam Kattikitta"	Shankar–Ganesh		
Gopura Vasalile	700	"Kadhal Kavithaigal"	Ilaiyaraaja		
Pudhu Manithan	701	"Angam Unathu Angam"	Deva		
Pudhu Manithan	702	"Yelelankuyilae"	Deva		
Thanga Thamaraigal	703	"Deviya Naan Saranam"	Ilaiyaraaja		
Thanga Thamaraigal	704	"Yaarodu Naan Solvathu"	Ilaiyaraaja		
Chinna Thambi	705	"Thooliyile Ada Vantha"(Female)	Ilaiyaraaja		
En Rasavin Manasile	706	"Paarijatha Poove"	Ilaiyaraaja		
Captain Prabhakaran	707	"Paasamulla Paandiyare"	Ilaiyaraaja		
Adhikari	708	"Aathoram Poonthopu"	Gangai Amaran		
Adhikari	709	"Indha Raja"	Gangai Amaran		
Adhikari	710	"Naiyaandi Melam"	Gangai Amaran		
Pavunnu Pavunuthan	711	"Thedhi Onnu"	K. Bhagyaraj		
Pavunnu Pavunuthan	712	"Ennenna"	K. Bhagyaraj		
Pavunnu Pavunuthan	713	"Mama Unakku"	K. Bhagyaraj		
Pavunnu Pavunuthan	714	"Mullai Poo"	K. Bhagyaraj		
Karpoora Mullai	715	"Karpoora Mullai"	Ilaiyaraaja		
Karpoora Mullai	716	"Poonkaaviyam"	Ilaiyaraaja		
Karpoora Mullai	717	"Vaama Vaa"	Ilaiyaraaja		
Marikozhundhu	718	"Kannadhasane"	Deva		
Marikozhundhu	719	"Pookuyil Nitham"	Deva		
Marikozhundhu	720	"Theene Theraviyame"	Deva		
Marikozhundhu	721	"Thoda Thoda"	Deva		
Aatha Un Koyilile	722	"Ele Elanguyile"	Deva		
Nallathai Naadu Kekum	723	"Raavellaam Un Ngyaabagam"	Shankar–Ganesh		
Kaaval Nilayam	724	"One Two Three"	Shankar–Ganesh		
Mill Thozhilali	725	"Kaalam Ini Maari Vidum"	Deva		
Idhaya Vaasal	726	"Kannukkul Unnaithaan"	Viji Manuel		
Cheran Pandiyan	727	"Kangal Ondraga"	Soundaryan		
Cheran Pandiyan	728	"Ethirveetu"	Soundaryan		
Manitha Jaathi	729	"Siru Paartham Paarthen"	Ilaiyaraaja		
Manitha Jaathi	730	"Enga Seemathurai"	Ilaiyaraaja		
Pudhiya Raagam	731	"Maalai Soodum"	Ilaiyaraaja		
Thambi Varuvaanam	732	"Thambi Varuvaanam"	T T Sundhar Raajam		
Vigneshwar	733	"Thannikinni"	S. P. Venkatesh		
Vigneshwar	734	"Poonkathe"	S. P. Venkatesh		
Maanagara Kaaval	735	"Thodi Raagam Paadava"	Chandrabose		
Ayul Kaithi	736	"Paaduthu"(Female)	Shankar–Ganesh		
Ayul Kaithi	737	"Paaduthu"(Duet)	Shankar–Ganesh		
Ayul Kaithi	738	"Oru Raakkozhi"	Shankar–Ganesh		
Archana IAS	739	"Vaazhkai Enbathu"	S. A. Rajkumar		
Archana IAS	740	"Naalu Vaarthai"	S. A. Rajkumar		
Pondatti Pondattithan	741	"Unnai Vida Oorile"	Gangai Amaran		
Vaidehi Kalyanam	742	"Jootudhan Jootudhan"	Deva		
Vaidehi Kalyanam	743	"Mathaalam Thatungadi"	Deva		
Vaidehi Kalyanam	744	"Thenthoovum Vasandham"	Deva		
Malai Chaaral	745	"Kelaado Vellikolusu"	MS Murari		
Mangalyam Thandhunane	746	"Oru Malligai"	Deva		
Mangalyam Thandhunane	747	"Kaatuvazhi"	Deva		
Veetla Eli Velila Puli	748	"Madhal Rathiri"	Shankar–Ganesh		
Veetla Eli Velila Puli	749	"Raja Maha Raja"	Shankar–Ganesh		
Veetla Eli Velila Puli	750	"Aambala Pechi"	Shankar–Ganesh		
Veetla Eli Velila Puli	751	"Vaadai Kaatru"	Shankar–Ganesh		
Azhagan	752	"Kozhi Koovum Neram"	M. M. Keeravani		
Azhagan	753	"Thudikirathe Nenjam"	M. M. Keeravani		
Azhagan	754	"Thathithom"	M. M. Keeravani		
Azhagan	755	"Nenjamadi Nenjam"	M. M. Keeravani		
Idhaya Oonjal	756	"Adhu Yaaro"	S. A. Rajkumar		
Idhaya Oonjal	757	"Maalai Neram"	S. A. Rajkumar		
Naan Valartha Poove	758	"Rasa Manasula"	Rajesh Khanna		
Naan Valartha Poove	759	"Uyirulla Roja"(Female)	Rajesh Khanna		
Onnum Theriyatha Pappa	760	"Cittu Cittan Kurivi"	Shankar–Ganesh		
Onnum Theriyatha Pappa	761	"Pondati En Kannadi"	Shankar–Ganesh		
MGR Nagaril	762	"Udal Konda"	S. Balakrishnan		
Manasara Vazhthungalen	763	"Raasi Nalla Raasi Thaan"	S. A. Rajkumar		
Nee Pathi Naan Pathi	764	"Yaarai Keattu Eera Kaatru"	M. M. Keeravani		
Nee Pathi Naan Pathi	765	"Paatu Paatu Padipathenna"	M. M. Keeravani		
Nee Pathi Naan Pathi	766	"Pondatti Kuppidum"	M. M. Keeravani		
Nee Pathi Naan Pathi	767	"Kaalam Ulla Varai Nee Pathi"	M. M. Keeravani		
Vasanthakala Paravai	768	"Inni Thati"	Deva		
Vasanthakala Paravai	769	"Pothi Vacha"	Deva		
Kizhakku Karai	770	"Enakanna Perandhava"	Deva		
Kizhakku Karai	771	"Selu Selu Seluvena"	Deva		
Sivaranjani	772	"Ranjani Siva Ranjani"	S. A. Rajkumar		
Nattukku Oru Nallavan	773	"One Two Three"	Hamsalekha		
Vaasalil Oru Vennila	774	"Malaiyile"	Deva		
En Pottukku Sonthakkaran	775	"Solla Vandha Vaarthai"	Deva		
En Pottukku Sonthakkaran	776	"Unnale Nenjam Raagam"	Deva		
Moondrezhuthil En Moochirukkum	777	"Sandana Kili Rendu"	Ilayagangai		
Moondrezhuthil En Moochirukkum	778	"Odam Ondru"	Ilayagangai		
Nenjamundu Nermaiundu	779	"Rajavae Chinna Rajavae"	S. A. Rajkumar		
Rudhra	780	"Vittu Vittu"	Gangai Amaran		
Rudhra	781	"Aadadu"	Gangai Amaran		
Thalattu Ketkuthamma	782	"Sutti Sutti"	Ilaiyaraaja		
Thalattu Ketkuthamma	783	"Yamma Yamma"	Ilaiyaraaja		
Putham Pudhu Payanam	784	"Mallige Poo"	Soundaryan		
Vaidhegi Vandhachchu	785	"Senthoorame"(Duet)	Deva		
Vaidhegi Vandhachchu	786	"Samajavaraga"	Deva		
Vaidhegi Vandhachchu	787	"Chinna Idhazh"	Deva		
Anbulla Thangachikku	788	"Paakku Thoppula"	S. A. Rajkumar		
Anbulla Thangachikku	789	"Manja Thanni"	S. A. Rajkumar		
Paattondru Ketten	790	"Yaar Endhan Ragam"	M. M. Keeravani		
Paattondru Ketten	791	"Oru Siru Paravai"	M. M. Keeravani		
Aadi Viratham	792	"Aadi Velli Puthukku"	Shankar–Ganesh		
Aadi Viratham	793	"Ettadukku Maligayil"	Shankar–Ganesh		
Aadi Viratham	794	"Maskara Marugo"	Shankar–Ganesh		
Thoodhu Poo Chellakiliye	795	"Elumicham Poove"	Deva		
Thoodhu Poo Chellakiliye	796	"Naan Yepodhum"	Deva		
Thoodhu Poo Chellakiliye	797	"Otharuba"	Deva		
Thoodhu Poo Chellakiliye	798	"Thalaatu Paada"	Deva		
Thoodhu Poo Chellakiliye	799	"Yano Yanai Azhika"	Deva		
Kurumbukkaran	800	"Gujili Gujili"	Sambath Selvam		
Rasathi Varum Naal	801	"Mamaa Mamaa"	Vijay Anand		
Rasathi Varum Naal	802	"Mukkona Sakkarathil"	Vijay Anand		
Rasathi Varum Naal	803	"Naan Podum"	Vijay Anand		
Rasathi Varum Naal	804	"Vaa Kanmani"	Vijay Anand		
Padhai Mariya Payanam	805	"Panneeril Roja"	Ilaiyaraaja		
Ponnukku Sethi Vanthachu	806	"Nizhalai Nizhalai"	Shankar–Ganesh		
Ponnukku Sethi Vanthachu	807	"Thenchittu Thennanjittu"	Shankar–Ganesh		
Thambi Oorukku Pudhusa	808	"Va Va Geethanjali"	Deva		
Thambi Oorukku Pudhusa	809	"Thulli Thulli"	Deva		
Thayamma	810	"Pazhaiya Kanavai"	Ilaiyaraaja		
Vazhndhal Unnodudhan	811	"Un Kannile Snehamo"	S. A. Rajkumar		
Vazhndhal Unnodudhan	812	"O Priya Priya"	S. A. Rajkumar		
Vazhndhal Unnodudhan	813	"O En Penne"	S. A. Rajkumar		
Vazhndhal Unnodudhan	814	"Kittavaa Villavaa"	S. A. Rajkumar		
Vazhndhal Unnodudhan	815	"I Live For You"	S. A. Rajkumar		
Nadodi Kadhal	816	"Maalaikarukkal Vandhu"	Deva		
Ezhumalayan Mahimai	817	"Prabho Venkatesha"	Ilaiyaraaja		S. P. Balasubrahmanyam
Apoorva Sakthi 369	818	"Puthiya Ulagille"	Ilaiyaraaja		
Ashwini	819	"Mohana Ragam"	M. M. Keeravani		
Ashwini	820	"Ettu Meethu"	M. M. Keeravani		
Ennamo Nadakkudu	821	"Kattazhagu Rani"	M. M. Keeravani		
Ennamo Nadakkudu	822	"Thanimai Ratri"	M. M. Keeravani		
Ennamo Nadakkudu	823	"Inru Naan Kadhal Rani"	M. M. Keeravani		
Ennamo Nadakkudu	824	"Ammadi Mutham"	M. M. Keeravani		
Ennamo Nadakkudu	825	"Ada Machchinikki"	M. M. Keeravani		
Coolie No. 1	826	"Solai Pookalai"	Ilaiyaraaja		
Coolie No. 1	827	"Kanava Nijama"	Ilaiyaraaja		
Coolie No. 1	828	"Chinnanchiru"	Ilaiyaraaja		
Mudhalamaichar Jayanthi	829	"Nenjil Yethoo"	Ilaiyaraaja		
Mudhalamaichar Jayanthi	830	"Om Namo Nama"	Ilaiyaraaja		
Mudhalamaichar Jayanthi	831	"Hey Raja"	Ilaiyaraaja		
Mudhalamaichar Jayanthi	832	"Adi Jin Jinukka"	Ilaiyaraaja		
Madras To Goa	833	"Vezhigal Pudhu"	Ilaiyaraaja		
Madras To Goa	834	"Rababba"	Ilaiyaraaja		
Madras To Goa	835	"Chinna Raani"	Ilaiyaraaja		
Sambavam	836	"Babiyo Paavayo"	Ilaiyaraaja		
Sambavam	837	"Mella Mella"	Ilaiyaraaja		
Sambavam	838	"Yeppa Yeppa Yena"	Ilaiyaraaja		
Gang Leader	839	"Pattuppoove Thottu"	Bappi Lahiri		
Gang Leader	840	"Vaadai Vaadai Mazhaiyin"	Bappi Lahiri		
Gang Leader	841	"Pallavaram Selai"	Bappi Lahiri		
Gang Leader	842	"Sunday Kannadithaay"	Bappi Lahiri		
Pokkiri Mappilai	843	"Aasai Vanthu"	Bappi Lahiri		
Pokkiri Mappilai	844	"Azhage Nilamma"	Bappi Lahiri		
Pokkiri Mappilai	845	"Bolo Bolo"	Bappi Lahiri		
Pokkiri Mappilai	846	"Love Me"	Bappi Lahiri		
Pokkiri Mappilai	847	"Onnukkulla Onna"	Bappi Lahiri		
Pokkiri Mappilai	848	"Sanjanakka"	Bappi Lahiri		
Gnana Paravai	849	"Kaalai Maalai"	M. S. Viswanathan		

=== 1992 ===
Film	Song	Composer(s)	Writer(s)	Co-artist(s)	
Ilavarasan	850	"Aaniponne Asaimuthe"	Deva		
Ilavarasan	851	"Kaatu Paravaigal"	Deva		
Ilavarasan	852	"Kangalil Thooduvidu"	Deva		
Ilavarasan	853	"Thaaye Nee"	Deva		
Pandithurai	854	"Enna Marantha"	Ilaiyaraaja		
Pandithurai	855	"Ennai Paarthu"	Ilaiyaraaja		
Vanna Vanna Pookkal	856	"Pangunik kapuram"	Ilaiyaraaja		
Agni Paarvai	857	"Ithazh Inikka"	Ilaiyaraaja		
Agni Paarvai	858	"Ohm Kousalya"	Ilaiyaraaja		
Rendu Pondatti Kaavalkaaran	859	"Police Police"	Raj–Koti		
Rendu Pondatti Kaavalkaaran	860	"Sundakkai Kulambu"	Raj–Koti		
Kaaval Geetham	861	"Ethanai Pera"	Ilaiyaraaja		
Kaaval Geetham	862	"Thammara Thammaro"	Ilaiyaraaja		
Kaaval Geetham	863	"Then Pothikai"	Ilaiyaraaja		
Moondram Padi	864	"Kannu Rendum"	Shankar–Ganesh		
Sugamana Sumaigal	865	"Chinnapattam Poochi"	Chandrabose		
Naane Varuven	866	"Orey Jeevan Ondre"	Shankar–Ganesh		
Naane Varuven	867	"Pachamala Pennu Naan"	Shankar–Ganesh		
Naane Varuven	868	"Pogathey Ennai Thandi"	Shankar–Ganesh		
Naane Varuven	869	"Orey Jeevan"(Female)	Shankar–Ganesh		
Naane Varuven	870	"Ketenamma"	Shankar–Ganesh		
Naane Varuven	871	"Arambam Aagattum"	Shankar–Ganesh		
Jodi Sernthachu	872	"Ore Vedam"	M. S. Viswanathan		
Government Mappillai	873	"Ilavatta Poove"	Deva		
Government Mappillai	874	"Mama Mama Unnai"	Deva		
Government Mappillai	875	"Sontham Embathu"	Deva		
Government Mappillai	876	"Sottu Sottaga"	Deva		
Sivantha Malar	877	"Edhuvarai Pogum"	M. M. Keeravani		
Sivantha Malar	878	"Oru Nimisham"	M. M. Keeravani		
Sivantha Malar	879	"Eriyude"	M. M. Keeravani		
Sivantha Malar	880	"Oru Paattu"	M. M. Keeravani		
Naangal	881	"Paarthathenna Paarvai"	Ilaiyaraaja		
Kasthuri Manjal	882	"Melaakkum"	Deva		
Kasthuri Manjal	883	"Chikitita"	Deva		
Enga Veetu Velan	884	"Engal Kula Deivam"	T. Rajendar		
Enga Veetu Velan	885	"Paal Kavadi"	T. Rajendar		
Thangarasu	886	"Paavadai Thonga"	Deva	Kamakodiyan	
Thangarasu	887	"Poongatre"(Duet)	Deva	Vaali	
Innisai Mazhai	888	"Oru Patchai Kodi"	Ilaiyaraaja		
Bharathan	889	"Vaa Vaathiyare"	Ilaiyaraaja		
Chembaruthi	890	"Sembaruthi Poovu"	Ilaiyaraaja		
Senbaga Thottam	891	"Chinna Chinna Paavada"	Sirpy		
Nadodi Thendral	892	"Kadalukkul Serum"	Ilaiyaraaja		
Nadodi Thendral	893	"Yaarum Vilaiyaadum"	Ilaiyaraaja		
Tamil Ponnu	894	"Kargam Sumantharale"	Deva		
Tamil Ponnu	895	"Therkathi"	Deva		
Tamil Ponnu	896	"Aavaram Poo"	Deva		
Chinnavar	897	"Goondru Gongura"	Ilaiyaraaja		
Chinnavar	898	"Kottukkali"	Ilaiyaraaja		
Chinnavar	899	"Maarappu Chela"	Ilaiyaraaja		
Chinnavar	900	"Padakottum Pattammah"	Ilaiyaraaja		
Chinnavar	901	"Uttalangkiri Kiri"	Ilaiyaraaja		
Chinna Pasanga Naanga	902	"Jodi Nalla Jodi Ithu"	Ilaiyaraaja		
Oor Mariyadhai	903	"Kichchali Samba"	Deva		
Oor Mariyadhai	904	"Malaruthu"	Deva		
Oor Mariyadhai	905	"Mariyadai Ullavan"	Deva		
Pokkiri Thambi	906	"Silu Silu"	Deva		
Pokkiri Thambi	907	"Marai Karumarai"	Deva		
Vaaname Ellai	908	"Jana Gana Mana"	M. M. Keeravaani		
Vaaname Ellai	909	"Kambangade Kambangade"	M. M. Keeravaani		
Vaaname Ellai	910	"Nanodi Mannargale"	M. M. Keeravaani		
Vaaname Ellai	911	"Nee Aandavana"	M. M. Keeravaani		
Vaaname Ellai	912	"Siragillai"	M. M. Keeravaani		
Yermunai	913	"Aariraro Aariraro"	L. Vaidyanathan		
Yermunai	914	"Vanam Pozhiyattum"	L. Vaidyanathan		
Idhuthanda Sattam	915	"Kuruvi Kunju"	Sangeetha Rajan		
Thilagam	916	"Anbe Thilagam"	Chandrabose		
Kizhakku Veluthachu	917	"Pazhakiya Thengam"	Deva		
Sevagan	918	"Kalloori Mandabathil"	M. M. Keeravaani		
Sevagan	919	"Nandri Solli Paaduven"	M. M. Keeravaani		
Sevagan	920	"Thanga Kaavalan"	M. M. Keeravaani		
Nenja Thotta Sollu	921	"Rendu Panjavarna"	TN Kanna		
Nenja Thotta Sollu	922	"Mannikya Vendum"	TN Kanna		
Amma Vanthachu	923	"Soapu Madam Soapu"	Deva		
Amma Vanthachu	924	"Dhinathanthi Paperula"	Deva		
Annaamalai	925	"Annaamalai Annaamalai"	Deva		
Annaamalai	926	"Kondayil Thaazham"	Deva		
Annaamalai	927	"Rekkai Katti Parakudhu"	Deva		
Ponnuketha Purushan	928	"Kuruvi Pudhicha"	Ilaiyaraaja		
Ponnuketha Purushan	929	"Maalai Nilave"	Ilaiyaraaja		
Ponnuketha Purushan	930	"Duraina Durai"	Ilaiyaraaja		
Vasantha Malargal	931	"Ilam Thendralo"	Deva		
Vasantha Malargal	932	"Padatha Padal"	Deva		
Vasantha Malargal	933	"Yen Unmaigal"	Deva		
Vaa Vaa Vasanthame	934	"Poovae Sirupoovae"	Ilaiyaraaja		
Vaa Vaa Vasanthame	935	"Ithu Etthani Kala"	Ilaiyaraaja		
Thaali Kattiya Raasa	936	"Oho Oho"	S. A. Rajkumar		
Thaali Kattiya Raasa	937	"Unnai Oru"	S. A. Rajkumar		
Magudam	938	"Chinna Kanna"	Ilaiyaraaja		
Magudam	939	"Indha Mamavukku"	Ilaiyaraaja		
Mudhal Kural	940	"Unnaithan Azhaikkiren"	Chandrabose		
Muthal Seethanam	941	"Oh Nenchame"	Soundaryan		
Naalaya Seidhi	942	"Mandhiram Chonnadhu"	Adithyan		
Pattathu raani	943	"Ada Thotta"	Deva		
Pattathu raani	944	"Devathi"	Deva		
Urimai Oonjaladugiradhu	945	"Darishanam"	Shankar–Ganesh		
Kottai Vaasal	946	"Mannavane Mannavane"	Deva		
Kottai Vaasal	947	"Aathirathil"	Deva		
Roja	948	"Rukkumani Rukkumani"	A. R. Rahman	Vairamuthu	
Mouna Mozhi	949	"Poonguilea"	Deva		
Mouna Mozhi	950	"Thanni Kudam"	Deva		
Mouna Mozhi	951	"Pothi Vachcha"	Deva		
Mouna Mozhi	952	"Ellam Enga Kasthuri"	Deva		
Thalaivasal	953	"Unnai Thottu"	Bala Bharathi		
Maappillai Vanthachu	954	"Pudhu Mappila"	Ilaiyaraaja		
Maappillai Vanthachu	955	"Unnai Oru Pothum"	Ilaiyaraaja		
Palaivana Ragangal	956	"Mella Nada Mella Nada"	S. A. Rajkumar		
Ellaichami	957	"Ye Sami Ellaichami"	S. A. Rajkumar		
Ellaichami	958	"Naana Naana"	S. A. Rajkumar		
Ellaichami	959	"Rosave Rosave"	S. A. Rajkumar		
Kizhakku Veedhi	960	"Maama Naan"	Deva		
Kizhakku Veedhi	961	"Thedinen"	Deva		
Kizhakku Veedhi	962	"Kondaaduvom"	Deva		
Matha Gomatha	963	"Karpagam Pol"	Shankar–Ganesh		
Samundi	964	"Ethungadi"	Deva		
Samundi	965	"Kannula Paalai"	Deva		
Annai Vayal	966	"Vaa Vaa Vennilave"	Sirpy		
Chinna Chittu	967	"Dhinam Dhinam"	Devendran		
Chinna Chittu	968	"Nenjil Kodiyaagam"	Devendran		
Chinna Chittu	969	"Kaanumo Kangal"	Devendran		
David Uncle	970	"Azhage"	Adithyan		
Annayin Madiyil	971	"Kannale Thaalam"	Mamallan		
Annayin Madiyil	972	"Chittukuruvi Rekka"	Mamallan		
Kaviya Thalaivan	973	"Vannakili Vannakili Oru"(Female)	Aravind Siddhartha		
Mangala Nayagan	974	"Kaatrum Kai Thoduma"	S. A. Rajkumar		
Mangala Nayagan	975	"En Kanmani"	S. A. Rajkumar		
Pandiyan	976	"Adi Jumba"	Ilaiyaraaja		
Pandiyan	977	"Anbe Nee Enna"	Ilaiyaraaja		
Pandiyan	978	"Pandiyanin Rajiyathil"	Karthik Raja		
Raasukutti	979	"Palayathu Ponnu"	Ilaiyaraaja		
Abhirami	980	"Kalaikalin Thaaye"	Deva		
Neenga Nalla Irukkanum	981	"Mangalyam"	M. S. Viswanathan		
Neenga Nalla Irukkanum	982	"Shivashankari"	M. S. Viswanathan		
Villu Pattukaran	983	"Vaanam Ennum"	Ilaiyaraaja		
Deiva Kuzhanthai	984	"Muthu Muthu"	Shankar–Ganesh		
Naalaiya Theerpu	985	"Vaadai Kulirkatru"	M. M. Srilekha		
Naalaiya Theerpu	986	"Udalum Indha Uyirum"	M. M. Srilekha		
Naalaiya Theerpu	987	"Udalum Indha Uyirum"(Sad)	M. M. Srilekha		
Natchathira Nayagan	988	"Siru Siru Mazhaithuli"	Deva		
Natchathira Nayagan	989	"Nallathaan Matti"	Deva		
Purushan Enakku Arasan	990	"Enthiri Enthiri"	Shankar–Ganesh		
Meera	992	"Pudhu Routeladan"	Ilaiyaraaja		
Dever Veettu Ponnu	993	"Nensara Nambi Naan"	Shankar–Ganesh		
Sooriya Namaskaram	994	"Thazham Poosela"	Deva		
Sooriya Namaskaram	995	"Anjaru Naalagave"	Deva		
Ashokan	996	"Kulu Kulu Endru"	A. R. Rahman		S. P. Balasubrahmanyam
Thalaivar Pondatti	997	"Oodhura Sangha"	M. M. Keeravani		
Thalaivar Pondatti	998	"Ooru Kilee"	M. M. Keeravani		
Thalaivar Pondatti	999	"He Macchan"	M. M. Keeravani		
Thalaivar Pondatti	1000	"Udan Pirapphe"	M. M. Keeravani		
Agreement	1001	"Manavazhan Ivanthanamma"	M. M. Keeravani		
Agreement	1002	"Oru Veenakkul"(Female)	M. M. Keeravani		
Agreement	1003	"Paruvangalin Palakkile"	M. M. Keeravani		
Dharma Bhoomi	1004	"Eppadi Kaadhal"	Ilaiyaraaja		
Dharma Bhoomi	1005	"Gumathalakkadi"	Ilaiyaraaja		
Dharma Bhoomi	1006	"Jumchaggu"	Ilaiyaraaja		
Dharma Bhoomi	1007	"Naan Thappa"	Ilaiyaraaja		
Dharma Bhoomi	1008	"Oh Brahma"	Ilaiyaraaja		
Dharma Bhoomi	1009	"Vaadai Kaalam"	Ilaiyaraaja		
Porkalam	1010	"Siruvani Meenuthan"	Ilaiyaraaja		
Porkalam	1011	"Mothamaai"	Ilaiyaraaja		
Porkalam	1012	"Manjathil"	Ilaiyaraaja		
Porkalam	1013	"Adi Nadayoh"	Ilaiyaraaja		
Porkalam	1014	"Adi Jillu"	Ilaiyaraaja		
Auto Rani	1015	"Ettu Ettu"	Bappi Lahiri		
Auto Rani	1016	"Ammadi Ammadi"	Bappi Lahiri		
Auto Rani	1017	"Ada Vaa Mama"	Bappi Lahiri		
Auto Rani	1018	"Chinna Chinna"	Bappi Lahiri		
Auto Rani	1019	"Takku Tamara Vandi"	Bappi Lahiri		
Periyavar	1020	"Vasanthame"	Raj–Koti		
Periyavar	1021	"Mangala Janaki"	Raj–Koti		
Periyavar	1022	"Ithuthan"(Duet)	Raj–Koti		
Periyavar	1023	"Naan Unnai"	Raj–Koti		
Aval Oru Vasantham	1024	"Arindhe Neeradu"	Nawaz		

=== 1993 ===
Film	No	Song	Composer(s)	Writer(s)	Co-artist(s)
Aadhityan	1025	"Gongura Nennu Andhra"	Gangai Amaran		
Aadhityan	1026	"Kattikko Koora Pattu Selai"	Gangai Amaran		
Jaathi Malli	1027	"Azaithaal Varuvaal"	M. M. Keeravani		
Jaathi Malli	1028	"Kamban Engu"	M. M. Keeravani		
Jaathi Malli	1029	"Manmatha Leelai"	M. M. Keeravani		
Jaathi Malli	1030	"Marakamudiya"	M. M. Keeravani		
Jaathi Malli	1031	"Solladi Bharathamatha"	M. M. Keeravani		
Jaathi Malli	1032	"Samundharu"	M. M. Keeravani		
Dasarathan	1033	"Unnai Kandu"	L. Vaidyanathan		
Ejamaan	1034	"Aalappol Velappol"	Ilaiyaraaja		
Mudhal Paadal	1035	"Padava Poongkuilea"	S. A. Rajkumar		
Madurai Meenakshi	1036	"I Love You Meena"	Deva		
Madurai Meenakshi	1037	"Maalai"	Deva		
Madurai Meenakshi	1038	"Thanga Kunam"	Deva		
Maharasan	1039	"Entha Velu"	Ilaiyaraaja		
Pudhu Vayal	1040	"Naanudatula"	Aravind		
Malare Kurunji Malare	1041	"Kadhal Paingkili Inbha"	Raveendran		
Malare Kurunji Malare	1042	"Kaaman Kadhai"	Raveendran		
Malare Kurunji Malare	1043	"Aathoram Thoppukuruvi"	Raveendran		
Pettredutha Pillai	1044	"Enga Veetu Mahalakshmi"	T. Rajendar		
Pettredutha Pillai	1045	"Paatu Onnu Naan"	T. Rajendar		
Pettredutha Pillai	1046	"Pethavaley Marachi"	T. Rajendar		
Kalaignan	1047	"Dillu Baru Jaane"	Ilaiyaraaja		
Minmini Poochigal	1048	"Kanmaniku Nenjil"(Female)	Adithyan		
Prathap	1049	"En Kannanuku Kaadhal"	M. M. Keeravani		
Prathap	1050	"Solli Adi Raja"	M. M. Keeravani		
Prathap	1051	"Mandil Oru Paatu"	M. M. Keeravani		
Prathap	1052	"Arjunare Arjunare"	M. M. Keeravani		
Prathap	1053	"Raathire Nerathil"	M. M. Keeravani		
Ulle Veliye	1054	"Kalathanamaha"	Ilaiyaraaja		
Vedan	1055	"Dina Thathikku Oru"	Deva		
Vedan	1056	"I Love You"	Deva		
Vedan	1057	"Kamma Karayile"	Deva		
Paadhukaapu	1058	"Pudhu Vennila"	Maharaja		
Paadhukaapu	1059	"Idhayame"	Maharaja		Mano
Porantha Veeda Puguntha Veeda	1060	"Thondharavu Pannathinga"	Ilaiyaraaja		
Porantha Veeda Puguntha Veeda	1061	"Veettukku Vilakku"	Ilaiyaraaja		
Porantha Veeda Puguntha Veeda	1062	"Chandrigaiyum"	Ilaiyaraaja		
Idhaya Nayagan	1063	"Vaa Thendrale"	Deva		
Idhaya Nayagan	1064	"Methuva Methuva"	Deva		
Gokulam	1065	"Antha Vanam"	Sirpy		
Gokulam	1066	"Therkke Adikkuthu"	Sirpy		
Uzhaippali	1067	"Oru Kola Kili"	Ilaiyaraaja		
Uzhaippali	1068	"Oru Maina"	Ilaiyaraaja		
Uzhaippali	1069	"Uzhaippaliyum Naane"	Ilaiyaraaja		
Kattalai	1070	"En Aasai"	Ilaiyaraaja		
Kattalai	1071	"Aathukara Mama"	Ilaiyaraaja		
Nallathe Nadakkum	1072	"Nalla Rathiri"	Deva		
Band Master	1073	"Keladi Kanmani"	Deva		
Band Master	1074	"Kili Joshiyam"	Deva		
Maathangal Ezhu	1075	"Meetu Ennai"	Vidyasagar		
Maathangal Ezhu	1076	"Netru Indru Naalai"	Vidyasagar		
Naan Pesa Ninaipathellam	1077	"Manoduthu Mayiloduthu"	Sirpy		
Naan Pesa Ninaipathellam	1078	"Kadhal Ennum Puthu Pattu"	Sirpy		
Naan Pesa Ninaipathellam	1079	"Aagaya Gangaye"	Sirpy		
Naan Pesa Ninaipathellam	1080	"Poonguyil Ragame"(Female)	Sirpy		
Dharma Seelan	1081	"Ada Sonnaal"	Ilaiyaraaja		
Kadal Pura	1082	"Veedirunthum"	Babu Ganesh		
Kadal Pura	1083	"Kadalamma"	Babu Ganesh		
Pass Mark	1084	"Un Punagai Pothumadi"	Deva		
Pass Mark	1085	"Yerikayya Yerikayya"	Deva		
Maravan	1086	"Singara Kuyilu"	Deva		
Udan Pirappu	1087	"Ammamma"	Ilaiyaraaja		
Udan Pirappu	1088	"Puthusa Oru"	Ilaiyaraaja		
Varam Tharum Vadivelan	1089	"Eesan Mel"(Female)	S. A. Rajkumar		
Varam Tharum Vadivelan	1090	"Varam Tharum Vadilelan"	S. A. Rajkumar		
Karuppu Vellai	1091	"Oh Swarnamuki"	Deva		
Karuppu Vellai	1092	"Azhagaana"	Deva		
Karuppu Vellai	1093	"Sathiyame Jayamaagum"	Deva		
Akkarai Cheemayile	1094	"Indha Naatkal"	Deva		
Akkarai Cheemayile	1095	"Idhu Muttha Poomazhai"	Deva		
Rajadurai	1096	"Muthu Muthu"(Duet)	Deva		
Rajadurai	1097	"Muthu Muthu"(Female)	Deva		
Dhuruva Natchathiram	1098	"Poovendru"	Ilaiyaraaja		S. P. Balasubrahmanyam
Dhuruva Natchathiram	1099	"Theysathi Theysamellam"	Ilaiyaraaja		Malaysia Vasudevan
Parvathi Ennai Paradi	1100	"Kombugal Illa"	Ilaiyaraaja		
Parvathi Ennai Paradi	1101	"Muthu Therey"	Ilaiyaraaja		
Chinna Jameen	1102	"Oru Manthara Poo"	Ilaiyaraaja		
Enga Muthalali	1103	"Bhoomikkum Saamikkum"	Ilaiyaraaja		
Enga Muthalali	1104	"Marumagale"	Ilaiyaraaja		
Kattabomman	1105	"Palaivanathil"	Deva		
Kattabomman	1106	"Priya Priya"	Deva		
Kizhakku Cheemayile	1107	"Then Kizhakku"(Version l)	A. R. Rahman		
Kizhakku Cheemayile	1108	"Then Kizhakku"(Version ll)	A. R. Rahman		
Paarambariyam	1109	"Ilam Pookkale"	Shankar–Ganesh		
Paarambariyam	1110	"Sandhana Kaatru"	Shankar–Ganesh		
Pudhiya Thendral	1111	"Thendralile"	Devendran		S. P. Balasubrahmanyam
Sabash Babu	1112	"Maane Marikkozhudhe"(Female)	T. Rajendar		
Sabash Babu	1113	"Podiyannu"	T. Rajendar		
Thiruda Thiruda	1114	"Veerapandi Kotayyile"	A. R. Rahman		
Thiruda Thiruda	1115	"Putham Pudhu Bhoomi"	A. R. Rahman		
Uzhavan	1116	"Kaathu Kaathu Dinam Kaathu"	A. R. Rahman		
Uzhavan	1117	"Kangalil Enne Eeramo"	A. R. Rahman		
Uzhavan	1118	"En Aatha Pon Aatha"	A. R. Rahman		
Kathirukka Neramillai	1119	"Thuliyo Thuli"	Ilaiyaraaja		
Purusha Lakshanam	1120	"Kaakai Chiraganile"	Deva		
Purusha Lakshanam	1121	"Mundhanaiye Naan"	Deva		
Purusha Lakshanam	1122	"Oru Thaali"	Deva		
Purusha Lakshanam	1123	"Sempatti Poove"	Deva		
Rojavai Killathe	1124	"Arthamulla Pattu"	Deva		
Rojavai Killathe	1125	"Nee Oru Pakkam"	Deva		
Rojavai Killathe	1126	"Yamuna Nathi Karaiyil"	Deva		
Kizhakke Varum Paattu	1127	"Saamaththu Kaaththu"	Deva		
Senthoorapandi	1128	"Senthoora Pandikku"	Deva		
Nee Oru Thanipiravi	1129	"Yaaru Adhu Ulle"	Deva		
Shenbagam	1130	"Ezhumalai Kaattu"	Deva		
Periyamma	1131	"Poove Varuga"	Ilaiyaraaja		
Periyamma	1132	"Ponnmani Maadam"	Ilaiyaraaja		
Ilam Nenje Vaa	1133	"Oru Mutham"	Ilaiyaraaja		
Ilam Nenje Vaa	1134	"Ini Vellvathu'	Ilaiyaraaja		
Ilam Nenje Vaa	1135	"Chittu Kuruvi"	Ilaiyaraaja		
Ilam Nenje Vaa	1136	"Vezhva Maranama"	Ilaiyaraaja		
Ilam Nenje Vaa	1137	"Mattai Kozhi"	Ilaiyaraaja		
Kaval Thurai	1138	"En Jenmamme"	M. M. Keeravani		S. P. Balasubrahmanyam
Kaval Thurai	1139	"Kanni Pappa Kanduko"	M. M. Keeravani		S. P. Balasubrahmanyam
Kaval Thurai	1140	"Guppu Guppu Malar"	M. M. Keeravani		S. P. Balasubrahmanyam
Kaval Thurai	1141	"Kanni Ponnu Bossu"	M. M. Keeravani		S. P. Balasubrahmanyam
Yarukku Mappillai Yaaro	1142	"Rose Rose Rose"	M. M. Keeravani		
Yarukku Mappillai Yaaro	1143	"Ah Ho Oru Malarukku"	M. M. Keeravani		
Yarukku Mappillai Yaaro	1144	"Kangal Paattu"	M. M. Keeravani		
Yarukku Mappillai Yaaro	1145	"Annamma"	M. M. Keeravani		
Yarukku Mappillai Yaaro	1146	"Hey Mohini"	M. M. Keeravani		
Yarukku Mappillai Yaaro	1147	"Olai Thantha Oorvasi"	M. M. Keeravani		
Yarukku Mappillai Yaaro	1148	"Veshamaa Ada Penn"	M. M. Keeravani		
Thaai Ullam	1149	"Paadaven Vandhenu"	M. M. Keeravani		
Thaai Ullam	1150	"Raagam Anuraagam"	M. M. Keeravani		
Galatta Maappillai	1151	"Vunna Rottu"	M. M. Keeravani		
Galatta Maappillai	1152	"Kanmani Ezhil"	M. M. Keeravani		
Galatta Maappillai	1153	"Mayavaram Mayabazar"	M. M. Keeravani		
Galatta Maappillai	1154	"Singari Sakkaravalli"	M. M. Keeravani		
Galatta Maappillai	1155	"Raittu Suttu"	M. M. Keeravani		
Galatta Maappillai	1156	"Onnu Seru"	M. M. Keeravani		
Galatta Maappillai	1157	"Kodi Vekkara"	M. M. Keeravani		
Narasimha Mannadiar	1158	"Arasammagan"	S. P. Venkatesh		
Narasimha Mannadiar	1159	"Manimandiram"	S. P. Venkatesh		
Narasimha Mannadiar	1160	"Thumbai Malare"	S. P. Venkatesh		
Manbhumigu Maistri	1161	"Yenda Kartavya"	Raj–Koti		
Manbhumigu Maistri	1162	"Chik Chikcha"	Raj–Koti		
Manbhumigu Maistri	1163	"Joru Vandhachi"	Raj–Koti		
Suriya	1164	"Then Kuyil Paadum"	Bappi Lahiri		
Suriya	1165	"Ramayya Ramayya"	Bappi Lahiri		
Suriya	1166	"Gulebakavali Ival"	Bappi Lahiri		
Captain Magal	1167	"Nandhavanam Pookkal"	Hamsalekha	Vairamuthu	S. P. Balasubrahmanyam

=== 1994 ===
Film	No	Song	Composer(s)	Writer(s)	Co-artist(s)
Mahanadhi	1168	"Pongalo Pongal"	Ilayairaaja		
Rajakumaran	1169	"Aadi Varattum"	Ilayairaaja		
Rajakumaran	1170	"Sithagathi Pookale"	Ilayairaaja		
Sethupathi IPS	1171	"Mazhalai Endrum"	Ilaiyaraaja		
Siragadikka Aasai	1172	"Then Sindhum"	Manoj Gyan		
Athiradi Padai	1173	"Jing Jikka"	Ilaiyaraaja		
Athiradi Padai	1174	"Senthaazhum"	Ilaiyaraaja		
Athiradi Padai	1175	"Vennilavin"	Ilaiyaraaja		
Subramaniya Swamy	1176	"Porakkavenum Porakkavenum"	Deva		
Chinna Muthu	1177	"Edhazh Oram"	Deva		
Chinna Muthu	1178	"Soodana Manasu"	Deva		
Chinna Muthu	1179	"Vadugapattiku"	Deva		
Aranmanai Kaavalan	1180	"Oorukke Nallavan"	Deva		
Aranmanai Kaavalan	1181	"Raja Kumaran"	Deva		
Captain	1182	"Iduppu Adikkadi"	Sirpy		
Captain	1183	"Kannatthula Vai"	Sirpy		
Pondattiye Deivam	1184	"Vaigai Karai Vaalum Deviye"	Bala Bharathi		
Purushanai Kaikkulla Pottukkanum	1185	"Enga Thodanga"	S. A. Rajkumar		
Purushanai Kaikkulla Pottukkanum	1186	"Idhu Aadham"	S. A. Rajkumar		
Adharmam	1187	"Vambookara"	Ilaiyaraaja		
Sakthivel	1188	"Idi Idikuthu"	Ilaiyaraaja		
Sakthivel	1189	"Paatti Sutta"	Ilaiyaraaja		
Sakthivel	1190	"Pambu Ena Vembu Ena"	Ilaiyaraaja		
Varavu Ettana Selavu Pathana	1191	"Sonnan Antha"	Chandrabose		
Varavu Ettana Selavu Pathana	1192	"Naan Ondru Ninai"	Chandrabose		
Veera	1193	"Konji Konji"(Female)	Ilaiyaraaja		
Veera	1194	"Pattu Poo Poo"	Ilaiyaraaja		
Veera	1195	"Vaadi Vethalai"	Ilaiyaraaja		
Oru Vasantha Geetham	1196	"Thanneerindri"	T. Rajendar		
Oru Vasantha Geetham	1197	"Thotta Chinungi"	T. Rajendar		
Vaa Magale Vaa	1198	"Ayya En"	Deva		
Vaa Magale Vaa	1199	"Veenai Vandhathu"	Deva		
Duet	1200	"Anjali Anjali"	A. R. Rahman		
Duet	1201	"En Kadhale"(Female)	A. R. Rahman		
Namma Annachi	1202	"Enna Dappa Partyinnu"	Deva		
Namma Annachi	1203	"Neelagiri Mala Orathila"	Deva		
Priyanka	1204	"Durga Durga"	Ilaiyaraaja		
Priyanka	1205	"Jilla Mulukka"	Ilaiyaraaja		
Pathavi Pramanam	1206	"Ore Oru Pattu Naan Paada"	Deva		
Pathavi Pramanam	1207	"Thulli Thulli Thudikithu"	Deva		
Pathavi Pramanam	1208	"Vetri Kottai Nayagare"	Deva		
Seevalaperi Pandi	1209	"Oyila Paadum Paatule"	Adithyan		
Super Police	1210	"Maamo Love"	A. R. Rahman		
Super Police	1211	"Muthamma"	A. R. Rahman		
Maindhan	1212	"Sikkikicha Sikkikicha"	Deva		
Rasigan	1213	"Beechoram"	Deva		
Rasigan	1214	"Bombay City"	Deva		
Chinna Madam	1215	"Muthu Muthu Pennoruthi"	Sirpy		
Mettupatti Mirasu	1216	"Mangalam Mangalamae"	MS Sriraj		
Manitha Manitha	1217	"Enna Mogam Kannamma"	A. R. Rahman		
Manitha Manitha	1218	"Kisu Kisu Namakkul"	A. R. Rahman		
Manitha Manitha	1219	"Hello Hello Anburani"	A. R. Rahman		
Pudhupatti Ponnuthayi	1220	"Meri Pyari Koyi"	Ilaiyaraaja		
Pudhupatti Ponnuthayi	1221	"Manam Poul Mangalyam"	Ilaiyaraaja		
Pudhupatti Ponnuthayi	1222	"Maankutti Nee Vadi"	Ilaiyaraaja		
Sadhu	1223	"Ithayame Oh"	Ilaiyaraaja		
Sadhu	1224	"Oorariya Peredhuththa"	Ilaiyaraaja		
Sadhu	1225	"Paddikirom"	Ilaiyaraaja		
Watchman Vadivel	1226	"Vaaram Thethi"	Deva		
Watchman Vadivel	1227	"Kannathil Kannam Vaika"	Deva		S. P. Balasubrahmanyam
Watchman Vadivel	1228	"Chandiranum Sooriyanum"	Deva		
Watchman Vadivel	1229	"Un Chinna Chinna"	Deva		
Kanmani	1230	"Ennai Parthu"	Ilaiyaraaja		
Kanmani	1231	"Sariyana Paruppa"	Ilaiyaraaja		
Senthamizh Selvan	1232	"Rathiri Pozhuthu"	M. S. Viswanathan & Ilaiyaraaja		
Senthamizh Selvan	1233	"Thaikulame"	M. S. Viswanathan & Ilaiyaraaja		
Senthamizh Selvan	1234	"Koodu Enge"	M. S. Viswanathan & Ilaiyaraaja		
Thamarai	1235	"Vellai Kili Oruththi"	Deva		
Sarigamapadani	1236	"Aye Vadi Chi Poya"	Deva		
Sarigamapadani	1237	"Ding Dang"	Deva		
En Aasai Machan	1238	"Aadiyile Sedhi"	Deva		
En Aasai Machan	1239	"Karuppa Nila"	Deva		
En Aasai Machan	1240	"Raasithan Kai Raasithan"	Deva		
En Aasai Machan	1241	"Soru Kondu Pora"	Deva		
En Aasai Machan	1242	"Valai Virikkiran"	Deva		
Killadi Mappillai	1243	"Ovanna Solli"	Deva		
May Maadham	1244	"En Mel Vizhunda"	A. R. Rahman		
Raja Pandi	1245	"Athipazham"	Deva		S. P. Balasubrahmanyam
Raja Pandi	1246	"Maharani"	Deva		
Raja Pandi	1247	"Paaye Than"	Deva		
Sathyavan	1248	"Kanmani Kanmani"	Ilaiyaraaja		
Sathyavan	1249	"Muthu Therey"	Ilaiyaraaja		
Ungal Anbu Thangachi	1250	"Yaaro Athu Yaaro"	Chandrabose		
Hero	1251	"Sollikkul Enna Irukku"	M. M. Keeravani		
Hero	1252	"Puraa Puraa Pen Puraa"	M. M. Keeravani		
Hero	1253	"Kanaadi Paarkka"	M. M. Keeravani		
Mudhal Payanam	1254	"Kaathal Kolla"	Deva		
Mudhal Payanam	1255	"Metukkale Metukkale"	Deva		
Thai Maaman	1256	"Enga Kulasamy"	Deva		
Thai Maaman	1257	"Amman Kovil"	Deva		
Veeramani	1258	"Chinna Chinna Chittu"	Ekandhan		
Veeramani	1259	"Chithirathil Thottu"	Ekandhan		
Pattukottai Periyappa	1260	"Pettikulae"	Deva		
Pattukottai Periyappa	1261	"Palakaattu"	Deva		
Ulavaali	1262	"Mocha Kotta Pallazhagi"	Sirpy		
Ilaignar Ani	1263	"Chinna Chinna"	Deva		
Ilaignar Ani	1264	"Kanni Poove Vaa"	Deva		
Thendral Varum Theru	1265	"Unnai Pole"	Ilaiyaraaja		
Jallikattu Kaalai	1266	"Sirimalli Poove"	Deva		
Jallikattu Kaalai	1267	"Thookanakuruvi"	Deva		
Mani Rathnam	1268	"Kadhal Illaathathu"	Sirpy		
Nammavar	1269	"Poonnkuyil Paadinal"	Mahesh Mahadevan		
Nattamai	1270	"Kambeduthu Vantha Singam"	Sirpy		
Nattamai	1271	"Kozhi Kari Kulambu"	Sirpy		
Pavithra	1272	"Eechambazham"	A. R. Rahman		
Pavithra	1273	"Azhagu Nilave"	A. R. Rahman		
Periya Marudhu	1274	"Ponnu Velayara"	Ilaiyaraaja		
Periya Marudhu	1275	"Raasavukku"	Ilaiyaraaja		
Karuththamma	1276	"Thenmerku Paruva Kaatru"	A. R. Rahman		
Veera Padhakkam	1277	"Meesa Vacha"	Deva		
Veera Padhakkam	1278	"Othaiyile"	Deva		
Nila	1279	"Raasa Mela Aasai"	Deva		
Nila	1280	"Rukku Namba"	Deva		
Magudikkaran	1281	"Koo Kukku Kuyilu"	Deva		
Pandiyanin Rajyathil	1282	"Sekka Sivantha"	Deva		
Pandiyanin Rajyathil	1283	"Raasaathi Nee"	Deva		
Pudhiya Mannargal	1284	"Onnu Rendu Moonuda"	A. R. Rahman		
Atha Maga Rathiname	1285	"Mampoove"	Gangai Amaran		
Manju Virattu	1286	"Mamma Unn Perai"	Deva		
Vanaja Girija	1287	"Othaiyila"	Ilaiyaraaja		
Vanaja Girija	1288	"Siragadikkuthu"	Ilaiyaraaja		
Chella Kiliye Mella Pesu	1289	"Sandhana"	S. A. Rajkumar		
Maappillai Thozhan	1290	"Pudhusu Puduhsu"	Deva		
Ellame En Kadhali	1291	"Uyire Uyire Idhu"(Duet)	M. M. Keeravani	Piraisoodan	Mano
Ellame En Kadhali	1292	"Party Party Oram"	M. M. Keeravani	Piraisoodan	Mano
Ellame En Kadhali	1293	"Jamma Jamma Jamma"	M. M. Keeravani	Piraisoodan	Mano
Ellame En Kadhali	1294	"Muthathin Yuddhathil"	M. M. Keeravani	Piraisoodan	Mano
Ellame En Kadhali	1295	"Anbe Thodu Aasai"	M. M. Keeravani	Piraisoodan	Mano
Ellame En Kadhali	1296	"Uyire Uyire Idhu"(Humming)	M. M. Keeravani	Piraisoodan	S N Surendar
Sabash Ramu	1297	"Vasanthame"(Version l)	M. M. Keeravani		
Sabash Ramu	1298	"Naandha Unakku"	M. M. Keeravani		
Sabash Ramu	1299	"Silu Silu Sittu Pattu"	M. M. Keeravani		
Sabash Ramu	1300	"Vasanthame"(Version ll)	M. M. Keeravani		
Anbalayam	1301	"Anbu Then Mazhai"	Raamlaxman		S. P. Balasubrahmanyam
Anbalayam	1302	"Oh Chinnamma"	Raamlaxman		
Anbalayam	1303	"Amma Amma"	Raamlaxman		
Anbalayam	1304	"Thedi Thedi Devan"	Raamlaxman		S. P. Balasubrahmanyam
Anbalayam	1305	"Vare Vaa Ramayya"	Raamlaxman		S. P. Balasubrahmanyam
Anbalayam	1306	"Alai Paayum"	Raamlaxman		S. P. Balasubrahmanyam
Anbalayam	1307	"Yenna Pattu Paada"	Raamlaxman		Mano
Anbalayam	1308	"Dhikthana"(Version ll)	Raamlaxman		S. P. Balasubrahmanyam
Hello Brother	1309	"Inbha Rangangal"	Raj–Koti		
Hello Brother	1310	"Yerikkaiyya Sami"	Raj–Koti		
Hello Brother	1311	"Inbathen Mutham"	Raj–Koti		
Hello Brother	1312	"Thottaadu Pandhaadu"	Raj–Koti		
Hello Brother	1313	"Malar Kili Kili"	Raj–Koti		
Vijaya Prathaaban	1314	"Varugirathe Vasantha"	Madhavapeddi Suresh		
Vijaya Prathaaban	1315	"Amma Shambhavi"	Madhavapeddi Suresh		
Chinna Durai Periya Durai	1316	"Aagaya Gangai"(Female)	Shivaji Raja		
Chinna Durai Periya Durai	1317	"Aamadi Kumikal"	Shivaji Raja		
Greedam	1318	"Angamma"	Raj–Koti		
Greedam	1319	"Ponmaane"	Raj–Koti		
Greedam	1320	"Thazhuvi"	Raj–Koti		
Greedam	1321	"Oh Naveena"	Raj–Koti		
Greedam	1322	"Indiran"	Raj–Koti		
Alex Pandiyan	1323	"Roja"	Vidyasagar		
Alex Pandiyan	1324	"Saamanthi Poove"	Vidyasagar		
Alex Pandiyan	1325	"Rajasekara"	Vidyasagar		
Alex Pandiyan	1326	"Amma Endral"	Vidyasagar		
Alex Pandiyan	1327	"Swamy Vaa Vaa"	Vidyasagar		
Alex Pandiyan	1328	"Kuthu Kuthu"	Vidyasagar		
Alex Pandiyan	1329	"Amma Endral"(Repeat)	Vidyasagar		
Ravanan	1330	"Maaraappu Selaikkila"	A K Vasagan		

=== 1995 ===
Film	No	Song	Composer(s)	Writer(s)	Co-artist(s)
Karuppu Nila	1331	"Coffee Venuma"	Deva		
Karuppu Nila	1332	"Namma"	Deva		
Karuppu Nila	1333	"Sunda Kunji"	Deva		
Engirundho Vandhan	1334	"Nilave Vaa"	Viswanathan–Ramamoorthy		
Engirundho Vandhan	1335	"Nandhavana"	Viswanathan–Ramamoorthy		
Engirundho Vandhan	1336	"Oru Kootil"	Viswanathan–Ramamoorthy		
Baashha	1337	"Thanga Magan"	Deva		
Baashha	1338	"Style Style Thaan"	Deva		
Baashha	1339	"Azhagu Azhagu"	Deva		
Kattumarakaran	1340	"Chinna Poove"	Ilaiyaraaja		
Kattumarakaran	1341	"Vetri Vetri"	Ilaiyaraaja		
Sathi Leelavathi	1342	"Marugo Marugo"	Ilaiyaraaja		
Sathi Leelavathi	1343	"Maharajanodu"	Ilaiyaraaja		
Veluchami	1344	"Chinnamma"(Female)	Deva		
Veluchami	1345	"Kan Azhagu"	Deva		
Gangai Karai Paattu	1346	"Ye Nasaari"	Deva		
Gangai Karai Paattu	1347	"Maapela Thedungadi"	Deva		
Gangai Karai Paattu	1348	"Oru Brundhavanathinil"	Deva		
Mudhal Udhayam	1349	"Poongatre"	Shankar–Ganesh		
Paattu Padava	1350	"Paadura"	Ilaiyaraaja		
Deva	1351	"Chinna Paiyyan"	Deva		
Deva	1352	"Oru Kaditham"(Female)	Deva		
Chinna Mani	1353	"Eesawari Unaiye"	Deva		
Chinna Mani	1354	"Kiliye Kiliye"	Deva		
Chinna Mani	1355	"Vanthathu"	Deva		
Kalyanam	1356	"Or Aayiram Venmalikai"	Shiva		
Manathile Oru Paattu	1357	"Kanne Azhagiya"	Ilayagangai		
Puthiya Aatchi	1358	"Eezhu Eezhu Vanam"	Premi-Sreeni		
Puthiya Aatchi	1359	"Mutharame"	Premi-Sreeni		
Bombay	1360	"Kannalanae"	A. R. Rahman		
Bombay	1361	"Uyire Uyire"	A. R. Rahman		
Muthukulikka Vaariyala	1362	"Thangame"	Soundaryan		
Muthukulikka Vaariyala	1363	"Ilavattame"	Soundaryan		
Muthukulikka Vaariyala	1364	"Chik Chik"	Soundaryan		
Thondan	1365	"Littaalaa"	Rajan Sarma		
Aanazhagan	1366	"Aaacha Paatcha"	Ilaiyaraaja		
Aanazhagan	1367	"Arul Kann Paarvai"	Ilaiyaraaja		
Aanazhagan	1368	"Eley Matchi"	Ilaiyaraaja		
Udhavum Karangal	1369	"Thirumananaalam"	Adithyan		
En Pondatti Nallava	1370	"Kovai Kodi Kondu"	Deva		
Lucky Man	1371	"Ammmamma Anandham"	Adithyan		
Lucky Man	1372	"Yama Dharmaraja"	Adithyan		
Pasumpon	1373	"Adi Aathi"	Vidyasagar		
Pasumpon	1374	"Vada Thangam Vada"	Vidyasagar		
Chinna Vathiyar	1375	"Vatta Pandhu"	Ilaiyaraaja		
Chinna Vathiyar	1376	"Intha Padukaiyile"	Ilaiyaraaja		
Chinna Vathiyar	1377	"Love Pannidathan"	Ilaiyaraaja		
Indira	1378	"Thoda Thoda Malarndhadhenna"	A. R. Rahman		
Nandhavana Theru	1379	"Viralil Suthi Meettavaa"	Ilaiyaraaja		
Chellakannu	1380	"Chinna Kurivi"	Deva		
Sandhaikku Vandha Kili	1381	"Mayilu Mayilu"	Deva		
Rani Maharani	1382	"Maamanare Maamanare"	Deva		
Rani Maharani	1383	"Senthoora Pattu"	Deva		
Anbu Magan	1384	"Marumagale"	Deva		
Anbu Magan	1385	"Chinna Chiru"	Deva		
Marumagan	1386	"Laila Laila"	Deva		
Witness	1387	"Kannil Oru Minnal"	Premi-Sreeni		
Witness	1388	"Naan Unnai Than"	Premi-Sreeni		
Gandhi Pirantha Mann	1389	"Pattam Pattam"	Deva		
Gandhi Pirantha Mann	1390	"Pooparikira"	Deva		
Chakravarthy	1391	"Idathu Kaalai"	Deva		
Aval Potta Kolam	1392	"Penn Sonal"	Chandrabose		
Mayabazar	1393	"Birthday Party"	Ilaiyaraaja		
Mayabazar	1394	"Adada Oru"	Ilaiyaraaja		
Mayabazar	1395	"Muthu Muthu"	Ilaiyaraaja		
Vishnu	1396	"Singara Kannukku"	Deva		
Nadodi Mannan	1397	"Thenkizhakku"	Deva		
Raasaiyya	1398	"Karuvattu"	Ilaiyaraaja		
Raasaiyya	1399	"Unna Ninaichu"	Ilaiyaraaja		
Periya Kudumbam	1400	"Aakki Vecha Soru"	Ilaiyaraaja		
Periya Kudumbam	1401	"Muchathu Maadapura"	Ilaiyaraaja		
Periya Kudumbam	1402	"Muthamma"	Ilaiyaraaja		
Periya Kudumbam	1403	"Thatthi"	Ilaiyaraaja		
Aasai	1404	"Pulveli Pulveli"(Female)	Deva		
Mr. Madras	1405	"Akka Maga"	Vidyasagar		
Kolangal	1406	"Tamizhan Padaichu"	Ilaiyaraaja		
Kolangal	1407	"Ullaasa Poongatre"	Ilaiyaraaja		
Sindhu Bath	1408	"Sindhubath Kottaiyile"	Deva		
Sindhu Bath	1409	"Va Va Kanni Thene"	Deva		
Mannukku Mariyadhai	1410	"Ponn Manne"	Devadevan		
Mannukku Mariyadhai	1411	"Poo Malaiyo"	Devadevan		
Mannukku Mariyadhai	1412	"Raathiri Ezhum"	Devadevan		
Chandralekha	1413	"Adi Aathadi"	Ilaiyaraaja		
Chandralekha	1414	"Sangili"	Ilaiyaraaja		
Chandralekha	1415	"Vanji Ponnu"	Ilaiyaraaja		
Makkal Aatchi	1416	"Kottu Melangal"	Ilaiyaraaja		
Makkal Aatchi	1417	"Melooru Maaman"	Ilaiyaraaja		
Muthu	1418	"Kuluvalilae"	A. R. Rahman		
Ragasiya Police	1419	"Manmathan"	Laxmikant–Pyarelal		
Seethanam	1420	"Chinnavaru"	Deva		
Seethanam	1421	"Rathiri Puthu Rathiri"	Deva		
Seethanam	1422	"Selaikku Potta"	Deva		
Seethanam	1423	"Velayal"	Deva		
Seethanam	1424	"Vanthalaappa"(Duet)	Deva		
Seethanam	1425	"Vanthalaappa"(Female)	Deva		
Ilaya Ragam	1426	"Pattikattu"	Ilaiyaraaja		
Ilaya Ragam	1427	"Unnai Naan"	Ilaiyaraaja		
Ilaya Ragam	1428	"Unnai Naan"(Sad)	Ilaiyaraaja		
Ilaya Ragam	1429	"Naan Ondru"	Ilaiyaraaja		
Ilaya Ragam	1430	"Maruthani Charu"	Ilaiyaraaja		
Maaman Magal	1431	"Chupke Chori Chori"	Adithyan		
Maaman Magal	1432	"Dhimthana Thomthana"	Adithyan		
Varraar Sandiyar	1433	"Vai Kaiyyinnu Solliputten"	Deva		
Murai Mappillai	1434	"Unnai Marunthu"	Swararaj		
Thotta Chinungi	1435	"Manammae"(Female)	Philip Jerry		
Mannai Thottu Kumbidanum	1436	"Aatha Muthu Mariyamma"	Deva		
Mannai Thottu Kumbidanum	1437	"Seethatin Kaiyai Thotta"	Deva		
Dear Son Maruthu	1438	"Chinnanchiru"(Female)	Deva		
Dear Son Maruthu	1439	"Malarudhu Nilavu"	Deva		
Karutha Machaan	1440	"Siru Siru Mazhai Thuli"	Deva		
Karutha Machaan	1441	"Veetu Thotathu"	Deva		
Karutha Machaan	1442	"You You I Love"	Deva		S. P. Balasubrahmanyam
Namma Ponnu Vazhanum	1443	"Rakkumuthu"	S. A. Rajkumar		
Pudhu Ponnu	1444	"Kattinilae"	S. A. Rajkumar		
Idhayame Idhayame	1445	"Megangalo Ennai"	Sashi Preetam		
Idhayame Idhayame	1446	"Manishavin Mugavettu"	Sashi Preetam		
Idhayame Idhayame	1447	"En Kadhala"	Sashi Preetam		
Paasavalai	1448	"Mutharam Seiya Poren"	M. M. Keeravani	Vaali	S. P. Balasubrahmanyam
Paasavalai	1449	"Chiranjeevi Showbhagyavathi"	M. M. Keeravani	Vaali	S. P. Balasubrahmanyam
Paasavalai	1450	"Hailesso Hailesso"	M. M. Keeravani	Vaali	S. P. Balasubrahmanyam
Paasavalai	1451	"Sree Hariyin Paatham"	M. M. Keeravani	Vaali	
Mouna Yuddham	1452	"Konjudha Kadhal"	M. M. Keeravani		
Mouna Yuddham	1453	"Innum Enna Mounamo"	M. M. Keeravani		
Mouna Yuddham	1454	"Happy New Year"	M. M. Keeravani		
Mouna Yuddham	1455	"Palak Palak"	M. M. Keeravani		
Amman	1456	"Arul Maraigal"	Sri Kommineni		
Amman	1457	"Arul Puriya"	Sri Kommineni		
Amman	1458	"Arulum"	Sri Kommineni		
Amman	1459	"Madhu Malar"	Sri Kommineni		
Rowdy Boss	1460	"Rendu Rendu Kannal"	Koti		
Rowdy Boss	1461	"Pettai Kozhi"	Koti		
Rowdy Boss	1462	"Unakka Unakka"	Koti		
Rowdy Boss	1463	"Chinna Ponnu"	Koti		
Rowdy Boss	1464	"Athaikku Magalo"	Koti		
Andru Oru Naal	1465	"Yema Kobama"	Sri Kommineni		
Andru Oru Naal	1466	"Thappu Nadakkudhu"	Sri Kommineni		
Andru Oru Naal	1467	"Yenamma Yennachenakku"	Sri Kommineni		
Andru Oru Naal	1468	"Yeno Thavikiradhe"	Sri Kommineni		
Naan Petha Magane	1469	"Manichudunga"	Chandrabose		
Ayudha Poojai	1470	"Akka Kulikara"	Vidyasagar		

=== 1996 ===
Film	No	Song	Composer(s)	Writer(s)	Co-artist(s)
Kizhakku Mugam	1471	"Kannum Kannum"	Adithyan	Vairamuthu	Adithyan
Kizhakku Mugam	1472	"Chithamani"	Adithyan	Vairamuthu	
Love Birds	1473	"Malargaley Malargaley"	A. R. Rahman		
Parambarai	1474	"Thanjavur Nandi"	Deva		
Parambarai	1475	"Vayakkaadu"	Deva		
Thayagam	1476	"Cu Cu Tara"	Deva		
Thayagam	1477	"Monalisa"	Deva		
Thayagam	1478	"Oru Indiya Paravai"	Deva		
Thayagam	1479	"Rangeela"	Deva		
Thirumbi Paar	1480	"Vala Vayasukulla"	Deva		
Ullathai Allitha	1481	"I Love You Love You"	Sirpy		
Vaanmathi	1482	"Poontha Malli"	Deva		
Vaanmathi	1483	"Vaikaaraiyil"	Deva		
Mahaprabhu	1484	"Jackie Chan"	Deva		
Vaikarai Pookkal	1485	"Uyir Vazhgiren"	Devendran		
Amman Kovil Vaasalile	1486	"Ila Manasu"	Sirpy		
Amman Kovil Vaasalile	1487	"Ponnoonjal Aaduthu"	Sirpy		
Amman Kovil Vaasalile	1488	"Vayasu Ponnuthan"	Sirpy		
Meendum Savithri	1489	"Avaravar Thalai"	Devendran		
Nattupura Pattu	1490	"Aatharikkum"	Ilaiyaraaja		
Nattupura Pattu	1491	"Kokki Vaichchen"	Ilaiyaraaja		
Nattupura Pattu	1492	"Nattupura Pattu"	Ilaiyaraaja		
Poove Unakkaga	1493	"Anantham Anantham"(Female)	S. A. Rajkumar		
Kalloori Vaasal	1494	"Kiss Me"	Deva		
Summa Irunga Machan	1495	"Tik Tik Tik"	Deva		
Puthiya Parasakthi	1496	"Aathoram Maligai"	Deva		
Irattai Roja	1497	"Arasana Nambi"	Ilaiyaraaja		
Irattai Roja	1498	"Siruvaani Aathu"	Ilaiyaraaja		
Maanbumigu Maanavan	1499	"Sooriyane"	Deva		
Kaalam Maari Pochu	1500	"Achcham Ennadi"	Deva		
Kaalam Maari Pochu	1501	"Punnagai Raniye"(Duet)	Deva		
Karuppu Roja	1502	"Mangala Roopini"	M S V Raja		
Karuppu Roja	1503	"Siraiyil"	M S V Raja		
Karuppu Roja	1504	"Siraiyil"(Repeat)	M S V Raja		
Sengottai	1505	"Paadu Paadu"	Vidyasagar		
Sengottai	1506	"Vennilave Velli Poove"	Vidyasagar		
Aavathum Pennale Azhivathum Pennale	1507	"Mavane Magarasanae"	Bala Bharathi		
Krishna	1508	"Idhayam Idhayam"	S. A. Rajkumar		
Avathara Purushan	1509	"Unnai Ninachi"	Sirpy		
Veettukulle Thiruvizha	1510	"Oothukottai"	Deva		
Kadhal Kottai	1511	"Kaalamellam Kadhal"	Deva	Agathiyan	P. Unnikrishnan
Sundara Purushan	1512	"Marutha Azhagaro"	Sirpy		
Sundara Purushan	1513	"Vennila Vennila"	Sirpy		
Tamizh Selvan	1514	"Aasa Kepakali"	Deva		
Poovarasan	1515	"Rasa Magan Raasanukku"	Ilaiyaraaja		
Poovarasan	1516	"Raasaathi"	Ilaiyaraaja		
Poovarasan	1517	"Intha Poovukku Oru"	Ilaiyaraaja		
Poovarasan	1518	"Kattikidalaam"	Ilaiyaraaja		
Priyam	1519	"Udaiyatha Vennila"	Vidyasagar		
Vishwanath	1520	"Kartharai Parthen"	Deva		
Vishwanath	1521	"1,2,3,4,5,6 Yenn Phone"	Deva		
Vishwanath	1522	"Mama Nan Unakku"	Deva		
Mettukudi	1523	"Velvetta Velvetta"	Sirpy		
Mettukudi	1524	"Adi Yaaradhu Yaaradhu"	Sirpy		
Sivasakthi	1525	"Marumagale"	Deva		
Vetri Vinayagar	1526	"Madhane Rathiyae Ennidayae"	M. S. Viswanathan		
Namma Ooru Raasa	1527	"Chinna Mani"	Sirpy		
Subash	1528	"Thendral Mela"	Vidyasagar		
Parivattam	1529	"Madurai Anthapakkam"	Deva		
Thuraimugam	1530	"Chinna Chinna"	Adithyan		
Thuraimugam	1531	"Rukkumani Wrongapora"	Adithyan		
Thuraimugam	1532	"Raja Rajavin"	Adithyan		
Gokulathil Seethai	1533	"Enthan Kural"	Deva		
Gokulathil Seethai	1534	"Gukulathu Kanna"	Deva		
Gokulathil Seethai	1535	"Nilavae Vaa"(Female)	Deva		
Kalki	1536	"Ezhuthugiren Oru Kaditham"	Deva		
Kalki	1537	"Porul Thedum"(Female)	Deva		
Kalki	1538	"Sariya Ethu Sariya Manitha"	Deva		
Panchalankurichi	1539	"Chinna Chinna"	Deva		
Panchalankurichi	1540	"Katrai Niruthi"	Deva		
Senathipathi	1541	"Moonu Mozhama Malliyappoo"	Deva		
Senathipathi	1542	"Palaivana Roja"	Deva		
Senathipathi	1543	"Yarukkum Thalaivanangaa"	Deva		
Gopala Gopala	1544	"Yuddhathil"	Deva		
Vasantha Vaasal	1545	"Athipathi Azhagu"	Masa		
Purushan Pondatti	1546	"Mazhaaiyadikuthu"	Sirpy		
Purushan Pondatti	1547	"Natta Nadu Rathiri"	Sirpy		
Purushan Pondatti	1548	"Pulla Venum"	Sirpy		
Deiva Saatchi	1549	"Anbae Yerenna Solla"	Deva		
Unnaiye Kalyaanam Pannikkiren	1550	"Kannukkul Un Uruvame"	Sandeep Chowta		Hariharan
Kanavu Kanni	1551	"Kendai Meena Thedi Poga"	M. M. Keeravani	Vairamuthu	S. P. Balasubrahmanyam
Kanavu Kanni	1552	"Manjal Niram Konda Ponnu"	M. M. Keeravani	Vairamuthu	S. P. Balasubrahmanyam
Kanavu Kanni	1553	"Meena Meena Nee Enna"	M. M. Keeravani	Vairamuthu	S. P. Balasubrahmanyam
Kanavu Kanni	1554	"Malligai Thoranangal"	M. M. Keeravani	Vairamuthu	S. P. Balasubrahmanyam
Kanavu Kanni	1555	"Iru Kangalil Kavithai"	M. M. Keeravani	Vairamuthu	S. P. Balasubrahmanyam
Kanavu Kanni	1556	"Kaniya Kaniya Oru Mutham"	M. M. Keeravani	Vairamuthu	S. P. Balasubrahmanyam
Siraichalai	1557	"Alolam Kili Thopilae"	Ilaiyaraaja		S. P. Balasubrahmanyam
Siraichalai	1558	"Suttum Sudar Vizhi"	Ilaiyaraaja		M. G. Sreekumar
Siraichalai	1559	"Sempoove Poove"	Ilaiyaraaja		S. P. Balasubrahmanyam
Siraichalai	1560	"Maaman Kurai"	Ilaiyaraaja		
Devaraagam	1561	"Azhagiya Karthigal"	M. M. Keeravani	Vairamuthu	
Devaraagam	1562	"Ya Ya Yadhava"	M. M. Keeravani	Vairamuthu	S. P. Balasubrahmanyam
Devaraagam	1563	"Kadhal Ganam"	M. M. Keeravani	Vairamuthu	
Bombay Kadhali	1564	"Un Aasai Kadhali"	M. M. Keeravani		
Bombay Kadhali	1565	"Manmatha Malaranbu"	M. M. Keeravani		
Bombay Kadhali	1566	"Raajkapoor Cinemawala"	M. M. Keeravani		
Bombay Kadhali	1567	"Hello Priya"	M. M. Keeravani		
Bombay Kadhali	1568	"Jeeva Naatha Ennodu"	M. M. Keeravani		
Bombay Kadhali	1569	"Balamurali Krishna Engal"	M. M. Keeravani		
Enga Oor Singam	1570	"Vuyara Poda"	Koti		
Enga Oor Singam	1571	"Ranga Ranga"	Koti		
Enga Oor Singam	1572	"Jilele Jilele"	Koti		
Enga Oor Singam	1573	"Naatu Kozhi Petta"	Koti		
Enga Oor Singam	1574	"Mogamammo"	Koti		
Enga Oor Singam	1575	"Poo Saral"	Koti		
Poomani	1576	"Then Podhigai Kaatre"	Ilaiyaraaja		
Poomani	1577	"Ila Vatta Vatta Kalla"	Ilaiyaraaja		

=== 1997 ===
Film	No	Song	Composer(s)	Writer(s)	Co-artist(s)
Dharma Chakkaram	1578	"Putta Putta"	Deva		
Kaalamellam Kaathiruppen	1579	"Nilladi Endradhu"(Duet)	Deva		
Kaalamellam Kaathiruppen	1580	"Nilladi Endradhu"(Solo)	Deva		
Kaalamellam Kaathiruppen	1581	"Suthudhadi Bambarathai"	Deva		
Kathirunda Kadhal	1582	"Many Many"	Sirpy		
Kathirunda Kadhal	1583	"Sir Uh Porandha"	Sirpy		
Minsara Kanavu	1584	"Manna Madurai"	A. R. Rahman	Vairamuthu	Unni Menon, Srinivas
Bharathi Kannamma	1585	"Thendralukku Theriyuma"	Deva		
Gopura Deepam	1586	"En Vaazhkkai Mannavane"	Soundaryan		
Nesam	1587	"O Ranganatha"	Deva		
Kaalamellam Kadhal Vaazhga	1588	"Putham Pudhu Malargal"	Deva		
Vaimaye Vellum	1589	"Kuiyil Pattu"	Deva		
Mannava	1590	"Indhu Maha Samudrame"(Version l)	Deva		
Mannava	1591	"Indhu Maha Samudrame"(Version ll)	Deva		
Mannava	1592	"Nee Oru Romiyo"	Deva		
Maradha Uravu	1593	"Endru Mogham"	M. S. Viswanathan		
Maradha Uravu	1594	"Oru Nemisam"	M. S. Viswanathan		
Mappillai Gounder	1595	"Madhuraina Madhuraithan"	Deva		
Vivasaayi Magan	1596	"Katradikkum Neram"	Sirpy		
Vivasaayi Magan	1597	"Oru Maina Maina"	Sirpy		
Vivasaayi Magan	1598	"Sathiya Thaiyin"	Sirpy		
Vivasaayi Magan	1599	"Vaanathilae Chandirana"(Female)	Sirpy		
Vivasaayi Magan	1600	"Vettaveli Pottalile"	Sirpy		
Arunachalam	1601	"Nagumo"(Version l)	Deva		Hariharan
Arunachalam	1602	"Nagumo"(Version ll)	Deva		
Dhinamum Ennai Gavani	1603	"Sevvanthi Thottathile"	Sirpy		
Raasi	1604	"Ennai Thedetho"	Sirpy		
Raasi	1605	"Thendral"	Sirpy		
My India	1606	"Ulagam Ondru Thaan"	Adithyan		
Vallal	1607	"Katharu Satai"	Deva		
Pistha	1608	"Siru Siru Manithuli"	S. A. Rajkumar		
Pistha	1609	"Siru Siru"(Sad)	S. A. Rajkumar		
Pongalo Pongal	1610	"Appanukku Paadam Sonna"	Deva		
Pongalo Pongal	1611	"Namma Thaikulamtan"	Deva		
Pongalo Pongal	1612	"Kalam Namakkunnu"	Deva		
Nattupura Nayagan	1613	"Nethu Pudhicha"	S. A. Rajkumar		
Once More	1614	"Poove Poove Penpoove"	Deva		
V. I. P.	1615	"Minnal Oru Kodi"	Ranjit Barot		
V. I. P.	1616	"Mayilu Mayilu Mayilamma"	Ranjit Barot		
Nandhini	1617	"Laila Laila"	Sirpy		
Kadhal Palli	1618	"Kadhali"	Deva		
Periya Idathu Mappillai	1619	"Kadhalin Formula"	Sirpy		
Periya Idathu Mappillai	1620	"Saare Jahanse"	Sirpy		
Raman Abdullah	1621	"Puthithai Ketkum"	Ilaiyaraaja		
Raman Abdullah	1622	"Sembaruthi Pennoruthi"	Ilaiyaraaja		
Raman Abdullah	1623	"Muthamizhe"	Ilaiyaraaja		
Abhimanyu	1624	"Thodu Vaanamaai"	Deva		
Kalyana Vaibhogam	1625	"Vizhioda Adiye Azhaga"	Deva		
Paththini	1626	"O Thendrale"	Deva		
Paththini	1627	"Sumaithangi"	Deva		
Aahaa..!	1628	"Mudhan Mudhalil"	Deva		
Periya Manushan	1629	"Arabnha Etham"	Deva		
Periya Manushan	1630	"Hollywood Mudhal"	Deva		
Periya Manushan	1631	"Oh Mama"	Deva		
Porkkaalam	1632	"Chingucha Chingucha"	Deva		
Ratchagan	1633	"Pogum Vezhiyellam"	A. R. Rahman		
Themmangu Paattukaaran	1634	"Ponnukku"	Ilaiyaraaja		
Themmangu Paattukaaran	1635	"Kaveri Aaru"	Ilaiyaraaja		
Themmangu Paattukaaran	1636	"Namma Manasu"	Ilaiyaraaja		
Vasuki	1637	"Muthamma"	Ilaiyaraaja		
Vasuki	1639	"Veppilai"	Ilaiyaraaja		
Vasuki	1640	"Vamsathuku"	Ilaiyaraaja		
Vidukathai	1641	"Idhayam Idhayam"	Deva		
Vidukathai	1642	"Meenakshi Kaiyil"	Deva		
Thadayam	1643	"Oh Poornima"	Deva		
Kadavul	1644	"Kovilukku Irukkum"	Ilaiyaraaja		
Poochudava	1645	"Kaadhal Kaadhal"	Sirpy		
Poochudava	1646	"Sillu Sillu"	Sirpy		
Kadhalukku Mariyadhai	1647	"Anantha Kuyilin Pattu"	Ilaiyaraaja		
Kadhalukku Mariyadhai	1648	"Anantha Kuyilin Pattu"(Solo)	Ilaiyaraaja		
Punniyavathi	1649	"Oru Aalam Poovu"	Ilaiyaraaja		
Chinna Ramasamy Periya Ramasamy	1650	"Unnai Naan Sernthiruka"	Ilaiyaraaja		
Poonjolai	1651	"Kokkoga Kokkarako"	Ilaiyaraaja		
Ottam	1652	"Sooriyanaai"	A. R. Rahman		
Ottam	1653	"En Kaadhal Neruppil"	A. R. Rahman		
Uyirinum Melaaga	1654	"Thulludu Nenjil Aasai"	Deva		
Uyirinum Melaaga	1655	"Elanju Suriyan"	Deva		Mano
Uyirinum Melaaga	1656	"Sampangi"	Deva		
Uyirinum Melaaga	1657	"Mangai Mayil"	Deva		Mano
Uyirinum Melaaga	1658	"Thulludu Nenjil Aasai"(Sad)	Deva		
Charumathi	1659	"Kanni Theevu Kathai"	Deva		
Charumathi	1660	"Maalai Maalai Poo"	Deva		
Adhanda Idhanda	1661	"Mundha Naal"	Deva		
Unakkum Enakkum Kalyanam	1662	"Solla Vanthathai"	Sirpy		
Annamacharya	1663	"Ketpathe"	M. M. Keeravani		
Annamacharya	1664	"Ilamai Konjum"	M. M. Keeravani		
Adimaipenn	1665	"Thene Senthene"	Vandemataram Srinivas		
Adimaipenn	1666	"Sivappu Vannam"	Vandemataram Srinivas		
Velli Nilave	1667	"Kobam Enna"	Koti		
Velli Nilave	1668	"Thanga Manam"	Koti		
Velli Nilave	1669	"Ippothe Ingae"	Koti		

=== 1998 ===
Film	No	Song	Composer(s)	Writer(s)	Co-artist(s)
Kaadhale Nimmadhi	1670	"Kaalaiyil"	Deva		
Maru Malarchi	1671	"Pankajame"	S. A. Rajkumar		
Maru Malarchi	1672	"Nandri Solla Unakku"	S. A. Rajkumar		
Ulavuthurai	1673	"Meena Un Kannukulle"	Shah		
Ulavuthurai	1674	"Ullatthai Thirandhu"	Shah		
Kondattam	1675	"Unnoduthaan"(Happy)	M. M. Keeravani		
Kondattam	1676	"Unnoduthaan"(Sad)	M. M. Keeravani		
Sundara Pandian	1677	"Kayil Vandha"	Deva		
Swarnamukhi	1678	"Pollatha"	Swararaj		
Kaadhal Mannan	1679	"Vaannum Mannum"	Bharadwaj		
Color Kanavugal	1680	"Muthangal Vazhangu"	Adithyan		
Kangalin Vaarthaigal	1681	"Sreeramane"	Ilaiyaraaja		
Vaettiya Madichu Kattu	1682	"Un Peyar"	Deva		
Vaettiya Madichu Kattu	1683	"Vaanuyarntha"	Deva		
Thulli Thirintha Kaalam	1684	"Azhage"	Jayanth		
Ini Ellam Sugame	1685	"Kangalilae"	Sirpy		
Ninaithen Vandhai	1686	"Maligayae Maligayae"	Deva		
Ninaithen Vandhai	1687	"Un Marbile Vizhi Moodi"	Deva		
Ninaithen Vandhai	1688	"Unai Ninaithu Naan Enai"	Deva		
Ponnu Velayira Bhoomi	1689	"Mania Thalikatti"	Deva		
Veera Thalattu	1690	"Kumbhabhi"	Ilaiyaraaja		
Veera Thalattu	1691	"Alapirandha"	Ilaiyaraaja		
Kavalai Padathe Sagodhara	1692	"Maama Poo Poo"	Ilaiyaraaja		
Jolly	1693	"Otha Kallu Mookuthi"	Kavi		
Rathna	1694	"Vaan Thuli"	Jayasurya		
Rathna	1695	"Vanjikodi"	Jayasurya		
Aval Varuvala	1696	"Sikki Mukki"	S. A. Rajkumar		
Aval Varuvala	1697	"Seliayile Veedu"	S. A. Rajkumar		
Harichandra	1698	"Mundhaanai Saelai"	Agosh		
Golmaal	1699	"Nee Pesum"	Bala Bharathi		
Priyamudan	1700	"Pooja Vaa"	Deva		
Kanmani Oru Kavithai	1701	"Rimjim Rimjim"	Ilaiyaraaja		
Kanmani Oru Kavithai	1702	"Ulagam Unakku"	Ilaiyaraaja		
Kanmani Oru Kavithai	1703	"Ulaga Athisayam"	Ilaiyaraaja		
Kanmani Oru Kavithai	1704	"Ragam Azhaitha"	Ilaiyaraaja		
Kanmani Oru Kavithai	1705	"Jangu Jangu Janga"	Ilaiyaraaja		
Natpukkaga	1706	"Chinna Chinna Mundhiriya"	Deva		
Kalyana Galatta	1707	"Velli Mazhai"	Yuvan Shankar Raja		
Sollamale	1708	"Sollathae"	Bobby		
Sollamale	1709	"Sollu Chollu"	Bobby		
Nilaave Vaa	1710	"Nee Kaatru"(Duet Version)	Vidyasagar		
Unnidathil Ennai Koduthen	1711	"Kaatrukku Thudhuvittu"	S. A. Rajkumar		
En Aasai Rasave	1712	"Pathu Rooba Ravikkai"	Deva	Kasthuri Raja	Arunmozhi
Ellame En Pondattithaan	1713	"Kothamalli"	Deva		
Ellame En Pondattithaan	1714	"Twinkle Twinkle"	Deva		
Ellame En Pondattithaan	1715	"Valzhuvar Kuppamthanda"	Deva		
Kannedhirey Thondrinal	1716	"Kanave Kalaiyadhe"	Deva		
Senthooram	1717	"Unakkoruthi"	Ilaiyaraaja		
En Uyir Nee Thaane	1718	"Mela Mela"	Deva		
Urimai Por	1719	"Ilangkaali Deviamma"	Deva		
Pudhumai Pithan	1720	"Onnu Rendu"(Female)	Deva		
Guru Paarvai	1721	"Ek Ladka"	Deva		
Uyirodu Uyiraga	1722	"Anbae Anbae"	Vidyasagar		
Kannathal	1723	"Munthi Munthi Vinayagare"	Ilaiyaraaja		
Pooveli	1724	"Oru Poo Ezhuthum"	Bharadwaj		
Cheran Chozhan Pandian	1725	"Nam Vazhvile"	Soundaryan		
Nee Enakku Uyiramma	1726	"Pennazhage"	Deva		
Nee Enakku Uyiramma	1727	"Periyavargale"	Deva		
Nee Enakku Uyiramma	1728	"Kanmani Roja"	Deva		
Thambikku Thaai Manasu	1729	"Sorgathukku Enipadi"	Deva		
Harikrishnans	1730	"Ponnaambal"	Ouseppachan		K. J. Yesudas
Harikrishnans	1731	"Pooja Deivam"	Ouseppachan		S. P. Balasubrahmanyam
Harikrishnans	1732	"Thamizhisai Mazhai"	Ouseppachan		P. Unnikrishnan
Naga Devi	1733	"Naga Deviye"	Vandemataram Srinivas		
Culcutta	1734	"Kannile"	Mani Sharma		
Culcutta	1735	"Uthattu Then"	Mani Sharma		
Muradan	1736	"Nithamum"	Mani Sharma		
Muradan	1737	"Sorry Sorry"	Mani Sharma		

=== 1999 ===
Film	No	Song	Composer(s)	Writer(s)	Co-artist(s)
Suriya Paarvai	1738	"Kadhavai Thirakkum"(Female)	S. A. Rajkumar		
Thodarum	1739	"Yamma Yamma"	Ilaiyaraaja		
Thullatha Manamum Thullum	1740	"Thoda Thodu Enave"	S. A. Rajkumar		
Thullatha Manamum Thullum	1741	"Innisai Paadivarum"(Female)	S. A. Rajkumar		
Kallazhagar	1742	"Thoonda Thoonda" & "Azhaga Kallazhaga" (film version)	Deva		
Unnai Thedi	1743	"Malavika"	Deva		
Adutha Kattam	1744	"Karumbukku Vearummbu"	S. P. Venkatesh		
En Swasa Kaatre	1745	"En Swasa Kaatre"(Humming)	A. R. Rahman		
En Swasa Kaatre	1746	"Theendai"	A. R. Rahman		
En Swasa Kaatre	1747	"Thirakkadha"	A. R. Rahman		
Endrendrum Kadhal	1748	"Kangala Minnala"	Manoj Bhatnagar		
Endrendrum Kadhal	1749	"Nanodi Nanba"	Manoj Bhatnagar		
Devi	1750	"Kumkuma Poovin"	Devi Sri Prasad		
Devi	1751	"Nallodu Vedhamum"	Devi Sri Prasad		
Devi	1752	"Seevani Rudhrani"	Devi Sri Prasad		
Periyanna	1753	"Pacholay Keethukulla"	Bharani		
Periyanna	1754	"Thanthane Thamara"	Bharani		
Nilave Mugam Kaattu	1755	"Suthatha Bhoomi"	Ilaiyaraaja		
Poomagal Oorvalam	1756	"Malare Oru Varthai"	Bharani		
Poomagal Oorvalam	1757	"Naan Thai Yendhru"	Bharani		
Poomagal Oorvalam	1758	"Kannai Parikkira"	Bharani		
Poomaname Vaa	1759	"Ennai Thottu Vittu"	Sirpy		
Rajasthan	1760	"Machan Machan"	Ilaiyaraaja		
Nenjinile	1761	"Manase Manase"	Deva		
Antahpuram	1762	"Azageah Unn Mugam"	Ilaiyaraaja		
Antahpuram	1763	"Ammmamma Kaadal"	Ilaiyaraaja		
Antahpuram	1764	"Poovetham Kanna"	Ilaiyaraaja		
Viralukketha Veekkam	1765	"Pombalaya Less"	Deva		
Viralukketha Veekkam	1766	"Pondatti Illaaina"	Deva		
Viralukketha Veekkam	1767	"Yettukattu Vaasal"	Deva		
Kanave Kalaiyadhe	1768	"Kannil Unnai"	Deva		
Kanave Kalaiyadhe	1769	"Dilli Thaandi"	Deva		
Malabar Police	1770	"En Kannadi Thoppukkulle"	S. A. Rajkumar		
Malabar Police	1771	"Palakaattu Ponnu"	S. A. Rajkumar		
Thaalam	1772	"Sarithana Sarithana"	A. R. Rahman		
Nee Varuvai Ena	1773	"Paarthu"(Female)	S. A. Rajkumar		
Nee Varuvai Ena	1774	"Oru Devathai"(Female)	S. A. Rajkumar		
Amarkkalam	1775	"Unnodu Vaazha"	Bharadwaj		
Jodi	1776	"Mel Nattu Isai"	A. R. Rahman		
Minsara Kanna	1777	"Theemukka"	Deva		
Manaivikku Mariyadhai	1778	"Aakka Poruthathu"	Sirpy		
Manaivikku Mariyadhai	1779	"Thaanguthana"	Sirpy		
Suryodayam	1780	"Kaadhal Oru Poonthottam"	Ghani		
Suryodayam	1781	"Anbu Arasala Vendum"	Ghani		
Hello	1782	"Intha Nimisham"	Deva		
Kannupada Poguthaiya	1783	"Kannoramai Kadhai Pesu"	S. A. Rajkumar		
Kannupada Poguthaiya	1784	"Manasa Madichi"	S. A. Rajkumar		
Taj Mahal	1785	"Karisal Tharasil"	A. R. Rahman		
Iraniyan	1786	"Chandirane Satchi"	Deva		
Unnaruge Naan Irundhal	1787	"Enthan Uyire Enthan Uyire"	Deva		
Manam Virumbuthe Unnai	1788	"Vanathil Aadum"(Female)	Ilaiyaraaja		
Paattali	1789	"Siruvani Oothallo"(Female)	S. A. Rajkumar		
Bharani	1790	"Nethirunda Ulagam"	Ilaiyaraaja		
Kodiesvaran	1791	"Tholaivinilea"(Female)	Agosh		
Kodiesvaran	1792	"Naan Keezhnaatu"	Agosh		KK

=== 2000 ===
Film	No	Song	Composer(s)	Writer(s)	Co-artist(s)
Kadhal Rojavae	1793	"Ilavenil Idhu"	Ilaiyaraaja		
Kadhal Rojavae	1794	"Midnight Mama"	Ilaiyaraaja		
Kadhal Rojavae	1795	"Pudhuponnu"	Ilaiyaraaja		
Kadhal Rojavae	1796	"Manam Pona Pokkil"	Ilaiyaraaja		
Kannukkul Nilavu	1797	"Chinnanchiru Kiliye"	Ilaiyaraaja		
Thirunelveli	1798	"Yele Azhagamma"	Ilaiyaraaja		
Vaanathaippola	1799	"Rojappu Maalaiyile"	S. A. Rajkumar		Mano
Vaanathaippola	1800	"Mainaave Mainaave"	S. A. Rajkumar		
Good Luck	1801	"Itho Intha Nenjodu"	Manoj Bhatnagar		
Good Luck	1802	"July Pathinaaru"	Manoj Bhatnagar		
Good Luck	1803	"Idhayam Thudikkirathe"	Manoj Bhatnagar		
Kakkai Siraginilae	1804	"Nenavu Therinja"	Ilaiyaraaja		
Rajakali Amman	1805	"Pudhukottai Bhuvaneswari"	S. A. Rajkumar		
Kandukondain Kandukondain	1806	"Kannamoochi Yenada"(Solo)	A. R. Rahman		
Kandukondain Kandukondain	1807	"Yengae Enathu"	A. R. Rahman		
Kandukondain Kandukondain	1808	"Kannamoochi Yenada"(Duet)	A. R. Rahman		
Kandha Kadamba Kathir Vela	1809	"Thenatru Meena"	S. A. Rajkumar		
Kannan Varuvaan	1810	"Kooda Mela"	Sirpy		
Unnai Kodu Ennai Tharuven	1811	"Unnai Kodu Ennai Tharuven"	S. A. Rajkumar		
Vetri Kodi Kattu	1812	"Valli Valli"	Deva		
Koodi Vazhnthal Kodi Nanmai	1813	"Kodi Vazhnthal"	Deva		
Koodi Vazhnthal Kodi Nanmai	1814	"Enga Veettu Kalyanam"	Deva		
Koodi Vazhnthal Kodi Nanmai	1815	"Engal Thamizh Selvi"	Deva		
Kann Thirandhu Paaramma	1816	"Amman Solai"	S.P.Eshwar		
Simmasanam	1817	"Kongu Nattu Mama"	S. A. Rajkumar		
Simmasanam	1818	"Manja Manja Kizhangu"	S. A. Rajkumar		
Independence Day	1819	"College College"	Deva		
Independence Day	1820	"Namma Thaayi"	Deva		
Sabhash	1821	"Kanave Kanave"(Duet)	Deva		
Sabhash	1822	"Kanave Kanave"(Solo)	Deva		
Unnai Kann Theduthey	1823	"Paatu Ithu"	Deva		
Budget Padmanabhan	1824	"AzhagaSundari"	S. A. Rajkumar		
Ninaivellam Nee	1825	"Ponne Ponne"	Deva		
Ilaiyavan	1826	"En Idhayam"	Ilaiyaraaja		
Palayathu Amman	1827	"Aadi Vanthen"	S. A. Rajkumar		
Palayathu Amman	1828	"Palayathamma Nee"	S. A. Rajkumar		
Priyamaanavale	1829	"Aayulin Andhivarai"	S. A. Rajkumar		
Thenali	1830	"Injerungo Injerungo"	A. R. Rahman		
Naga Devathai	1831	"Murali Seviye"	Hamsalekha		
Naga Devathai	1832	"Oorai Kaakum Muthayi"	Hamsalekha		
Naga Devathai	1833	"Naan Unnai Thozhundhen"	Hamsalekha		
Naga Devathai	1834	"Oh Vandhe Pon Poove"	Hamsalekha		
Seenu	1835	"Dey Nandakumara"	Deva		
Kuzhanthayum Deivamum	1836	"Senthamizh Thenmozhi"	Vandemataram Srinivas		
Kuzhanthayum Deivamum	1837	"Poo Mazhalil Paadum"	Vandemataram Srinivas		
Vanna Thamizh Pattu	1838	"Enna Solli Paaduven"	S. A. Rajkumar		
Vanna Thamizh Pattu	1839	"Nilavil Nee"	S. A. Rajkumar		
Snegithiye	1840	"Radhai Manathil"	Vidyasagar		
Snegithiye	1841	"Kalluri Malare"	Vidyasagar		
Snegithiye	1842	"Devadhai Vamsam"	Vidyasagar		
Pottu Amman	1843	"Oyyara Mayil"	S. D. Shanthakumar		
Manasu	1844	"Orumurai Irumurai"	Deva		
Manu Needhi	1845	"Engoorukku Mattum"	Deva		
Manu Needhi	1846	"Mayilaadum Paarai"	Deva		
Manu Needhi	1847	"Oru Roja"	Deva		
Kaadhal Vandhiruchu	1848	"Pati Pati"	Deva		
Sri Sai Mahimai	1849	"Sai Deva Sai Deva"	Adithya Paudwal		
Sri Sai Mahimai	1850	"Sai Divya Roopam"	Adithya Paudwal		
Sammatham Tharuvala	1851	"Manasellam Malligai"	Ramana Gogula		

=== 2001 ===
Film	No	Song	Composer(s)	Writer(s)	Co-artist(s)
Looty	1852	"One More Ketka"	Deva		
Nageswari	1853	"Thullathe Thullathe"	S. A. Rajkumar		
Thaalikaatha Kaaliamman	1854	"Kanavil Patha"	Sirpy		
Thaalikaatha Kaaliamman	1855	"Sun TV"	Sirpy		
Ninaikkatha Naalillai	1856	"Brahma Brahma"	Deva		
Paarvai Ondre Podhume	1857	"Thirudiya Idhayathai"	Bharani		
Vinnukum Mannukum	1858	"Chambaruthi Poo"	Sirpy		
Vinnukum Mannukum	1859	"Unakenna"(Duet)	Sirpy		
Badri	1860	"Angel Vandhaaley"	Ramana Gogula		
Little John	1861	"Baila Re Baila"	Pravin Mani		
Seerivarum Kaalai	1862	"Re Re Rataikkili"(Female)	Sirpy		
Sri Raja Rajeshwari	1863	"Chindala Karaiyil"	Deva		
Sri Raja Rajeshwari	1864	"Maruvathoor Om Sakthi"	Deva		
En Iniya Pon Nilavae	1865	"Sillendra Malare"	MSV, Ilaiyaraaja		
Sonnal Thaan Kaadhala	1866	"Sonnalthaan"(Duet)	T. Rajendar		
Dosth	1867	"Rendu Angula Roja"	Deva		
Dhill	1868	"Oh Nanbane"	Vidyasagar		
Alli Thandha Vaanam	1869	"Thom Thom"	Vidyasagar		
Veettoda Mappillai	1870	"Pombalai Enna Ambalai"	Deva		
Veettoda Mappillai	1871	"Mannukketha Machane"	Deva		
Veettoda Mappillai	1872	"Vaada Malare Vaada"	Deva		
Pandavar Bhoomi	1873	"Kaviyan Kaviyan Bharathi"	Bharadwaj		
Mitta Miraasu	1874	"Adiye"	Asalam Mustafa		
Samrat Asoka	1875	"San Sanana Sana"	Anu Malik		
Samrat Asoka	1876	"Thaankuma Kanakkalin"(Female)	Anu Malik		
Samrat Asoka	1877	"Thaankuma Kanakkalin"(Duet)	Anu Malik		
Paarthale Paravasam	1878	"Nee Thaan En Desiya Geetham"	A. R. Rahman		
Kottai Mariamman	1879	"Sri Ranganatharukku"	Deva		
Kaadhale Swasam	1880	"Sokude Kaadhal Sokude"	D. Imman		Sonu Nigam

=== 2002 ===
Film	No	Song	Composer(s)	Writer(s)	Co-artist(s)
Alli Arjuna	1881	"Shingu Lingu"	A. R. Rahman	Vairamuthu	
Grama Devathe	1882	"Karamugide"	Dhina	K. Kalyan	
Kamarasu	1883	"Chinna Chinna"	S. A. Rajkumar	Muthulingham	P. Unnikrishnan
Kamarasu	1884	"Paathi Nila"	S. A. Rajkumar	Muhammed Metha	S. P. Balasubrahmanyam
Style	1885	"Kadhalithal Anandham"	Bharani		
Mutham	1886	"Orampo Orampo"	Bharani		Harish Raghavendra
Padai Veetu Amman	1887	"Pathu Ooraiyum"	S. A. Rajkumar		
Padai Veetu Amman	1888	"Udukkai Piranthathu"	S. A. Rajkumar		Keerthi
Namma Veetu Kalyanam	1889	"Minnuthu Minnuthu"	S. A. Rajkumar	Thamarai	S. P. Balasubrahmanyam
Maaran	1890	"Felomina Ni Enthan"	Deva	P. Vijay	S. P. Balasubrahmanyam, Mathangi
Sri Bannari Amman	1891	"Thalattu Kettathillai"	T. Rajendar	Vijaya T. Rajendar	Anuradha Sriram
Sri Bannari Amman	1892	"Vandhidu Vandhidu"	T. Rajendar	Vijaya T. Rajendar	
Varushamellam Vasantham	1893	"Naan Ready"	Sirpy	Manavai Ponmanikkam	Krishnaraj
University	1894	"Kathalai Valarthai"	Ramesh Vinayagam	Vairamuthu	Ramesh Vinayagam
Ezhumalai	1895	"Ella Malaiyilum"	Mani Sharma	Vaali	Karthik
Thenkasi Pattanam	1896	"Konjam Thenkasi"	Suresh Peters		Srinivas
Raja	1897	"Karisai Kaattu"	S. A. Rajkumar	S. A. Rajkumar	Manikka Vinayagam
Shree	1898	"Vasantha Sena"	TS Muralidharan		Harish Raghavendra
Arputham	1899	"Nee Malaraa Malaraa"	Shiva		Unni Krishnan
Jaya	1900	"Nilavea Nilavea"	Bharani		

=== 2003 ===
Film	No	Song	Composer(s)	Writer(s)	Co-artist(s)
Aasai Aasaiyai	1901	"Theeppori Pondrathu"	Mani Sharma		Karthik
Student Number 1	1902	"Vizhamale Irukka Mudiyuma"	M. M. Keeravani		S. P. B. Charan, K. S. Chithra
Magic Magic 3D	1903	"Kanne Chella"	Shareeth		S. P. Balasubrahmanyam
Kadhal Sadugudu	1904	"Ramshikku Ramshikku"	Deva	Vairamuthu	Harish Raghavendra
Alaudin	1905	"Yaaro Yaaravan"	Mani Sharma	Yugabharathi	
Priyamaana Thozhi	1906	"Kattre Poongattre"	S. A. Rajkumar	Kalaikumar	
Priyamaana Thozhi	1907	"Kattre Poongattre"(Bit)	S. A. Rajkumar	Kalaikumar	
Kadhal Sugamanathu	1908	"Sollathan Ninaikiren"	Shiva Shankar	Viveka	
Lesa Lesa	1909	"Ennai Polave"	Harris Jayaraj	Vaali	Suchitra
Saamy	1910	"Idhuthaanaa"	Harris Jayaraj	Thamarai	
Inidhu Inidhu Kadhal Inidhu	1911	"Siragulla"	Devi Sri Prasad	Vairamuthu	S. P. Balasubrahmanyam
Parthiban Kanavu	1912	"Buck Buck Buck"	Vidyasagar		

=== 2004 ===
Film	No	Song	Composer(s)	Writer(s)	Co-artist(s)
Jai	1913	"Kanavu Kaanalam"	Mani Sharma	Ilakiyan	Vijay Yesudas
Jai	1914	"Medhu Medhuvai"	Mani Sharma	Thamarai	S. P. Balasubrahmanyam
Autograph	1915	"Ovvoru Pookalume"	Bharadwaj	Pa. Vijay	Bharadwaj
Maanasthan	1916	"Katha Katha"	S. A. Rajkumar	P. Vijay	
Maanasthan	1917	"Raasa Raasa"	S. A. Rajkumar	Nandalala	Hariharan
Sullan	1918	"Kavidhai Iravu"	Vidyasagar	Yugabharathi	Karthik
Desam	1919	"Mazhai Mega Vanna"	A. R. Rahman	Vaali	Srinivas, Srinivas Murthy
Jairam	1920	"Kannin Maniye"	Anup Rubens		
Kazhugu	1921	"Nila Nila Nee Vaa"	M. M. Keeravani		M. M. Keeravani
Mathumathi	1922	"Thirumagal Kanavanin"	Koti		

=== 2005 ===
Film	No	Song	Composer(s)	Writer(s)	Co-artist(s)
Ulla Kadathal	1923	"Naana Ithu Naana"	Bharadwaj	Muhammed Metha	
Mannin Maindhan	1924	"Kannin Manipola"	Bharadwaj	Karunanidhi	Master Sathiya
Mayavi	1925	"Mayavi"	Devi Sri Prasad	P. Vijay	Ranjith, Devi Sri Prasad
Priyasakhi	1926	"Mudhal Mudhal"	Bharadwaj	P. Vijay	
Pesuvoma	1927	"Sonnal Puriyatha"	Parris Sekar		Madhu Balakrishnan
Englishkaran	1928	"Nanbanae Nanbanae"	Deva	P. Vijay	
Kaatrullavarai	1929	"Aanvaasamum Penvaasamum"	Bharani	Kabilan	Karthik
Kaatrullavarai	1930	"Mazhaiyil Nanaindha"(Female)	Bharani	Yugabharathi	
Anbe Aaruyire	1931	"Varugiraai"	A. R. Rahman	Vaali	Hariharan
Uyir Ullavarai	1932	"Nenja Nenja"(Female)	S. A. Rajkumar		
Karpanai	1933	"Kannaney"	Santhosh Jayaraj		
Karpanai	1934	"Nenjil"	Santhosh Jayaraj		S. P. Balasubrahmanyam
Mazhai	1935	"Nee Varumbodhu"	Devi Sri Prasad	Vairamuthu	Kalpana, Raqueeb Alam
Vetrivel Sakthivel	1936	"En Chella"	Srikanth Deva	P. Vijay	P. Jayachandran
Vetrivel Sakthivel	1937	"Thangapadakathin"	Srikanth Deva	Vaali	S. P. Balasubrahmanyam

=== 2006 ===
Film	No	Song	Composer(s)	Writer(s)	Co-artist(s)
Aavani Thingal	1938	"Koottukkulle"	R Shankar		
June R	1939	"Puthu Puthu"	Sharreth	P. Vijay	Usha Uthup
Madrasi	1940	"Yentha Ooro Yaro"	D. Imman	Palani Bharathi	Karthik
Pasa Kiligal	1941	"Aruviyoda"	Vidyasagar		
Poi	1942	"Enna Tholaithai"	Vidyasagar	Kirithaya	
Yen Indha Mounam	1943	"Raman Seethai"	K. M. Radha Krishnan		
Uyir Ezhuthu	1944	"Aadi Maasam"	Deva		
Sasanam	1945	"Pudhiya Kalai"	Balabharathi		
Sasanam	1946	"Poove Nee"	Balabharathi		
Sasanam	1947	"Vaazhkayil Vaasal"	Balabharathi		
Sathanai	1948	"A Aa E"	Premkumar S		Manikka Vinayagam
Thoothukudi	1949	"Karuvappaiya"	Pravin Mani		Tippu

=== 2007 ===
Film	No	Song	Composer(s)	Writer(s)	Co-artist(s)
Guru	1950	"Rendu Maangai"	A. R. Rahman	Vairamuthu	S. P. Balasubrahmanyam
Guru	1951	"Orey Khana"	A. R. Rahman	Vairamuthu	A. R. Rahman
Pasupathi c/o Rasakkapalayam	1952	"Uyir Thantha"	Deva	K. Selva Bharathy	
Chennai 600028	1953	"Yaaro"(Love)	Yuvan Shankar Raja	Vaali	S. P. Balasubramanyam
Thee Nagar	1954	"Kadavul Ethukku"	Jassie Gift		
Thirutham	1955	"Kadhal Kanmaniye"	Pravin Mani		
Veeramum Eeramum	1956	"Maane Mayilazhage"	Yugendran		
Puli Varudhu	1957	"Aasai Vachen"	Srikanth Deva	Na. Muthukumar	Vijay Yesudas

=== 2008 ===
Film	No	Song	Composer(s)	Writer(s)	Co-artist(s)
Indiralohathil Na Azhagappan	1958	"Oom Apsara Namagha"	Sabesh–Murali		
Jodhaa Akbar	1959	"Idhayam Idam Mariyathe"	A. R. Rahman		Karthik
Sila Nerangalil	1960	"Thirudapatta Nilave"	Srikanth Deva		
Velli Thirai	1961	"Kaanchi Paanai"	G. V. Prakash Kumar		
Velli Thirai	1962	"Vizhiyilae"	G. V. Prakash Kumar		
Thithikkum Ilamai	1963	"Nenjai Thodum Isaiye"	K. Manish		
Kuselan	1964	"Om Zaarare"	G. V. Prakash Kumar		Daler Mehndi, Sadhana Sargam
Nayagan	1965	"Manimaniyaga"	Mariya Manohar		
Ghatothkach	1966	"Kadhai Solgiraen"	Singeetam Srinivasa Rao	Na. Muthukumar	
Panchamirtham	1967	"Nadhikkarai Oram"	Sundar C. Babu		
Marudhani	1968	"Enna Ethu Kolankal"	S. A. Rajkumar		
Irukkankudi	1969	"Vannam Sindum"	Sudershan		

=== 2009 ===
Film	No	Song	Composer(s)	Writer(s)	Co-artist(s)
Yavarum Nalam	1970	"Kaatrilae Vaasame"	Shankar-Ehsaan-Loy	Thamarai	Shankar Mahadevan
Yavarum Nalam	1971	"Kaatrilae Vaasame" (Remix)	Shankar-Ehsaan-Loy	Thamarai	Shankar Mahadevan
Unnai Kann Theduthe	1972	"Kagetha Puveni"	Sirpy		Unni Menon
Pazhassi Raja	1973	"Kundrathu"	Ilaiyaraaja		
Jaganmohini	1974	"Unnai Vittal"	Ilaiyaraaja		
Pudhiya Payanam	1975	"Ulangal Pesum"	Prasad Ganesh		
Sirithal Rasipen	1976	"Enakulle Irupaval"	Iniyavan		Hariharan
Kadhalukku Maranamillai	1977	"En Ithyam Thavitten"	Bharadwaj		

=== 2010 ===
Film	No	Song	Composer(s)	Writer(s)	Co-artist(s)
Thillalangadi	1978	"Sol Pechu"	Yuvan Shankar Raja	Na. Muthukumar	Shreya Ghoshal, Yuvan Shankar Raja
Pugaippadam	1979	"Idhu Kanavo"	Gangai Amaran		S. P. Balasubrahmanyam
Naanayam	1980	"Naan Pogiren"	James Vasanthan	Thamarai	S. P. Balasubrahmanyam
Goa	1981	"Vaalibaa Vaa Vaa"	Yuvan Shankar Raja	Gangai Amaran	Ilaiyaraaja, S. P. Balasubrahmanyam
Thunichal	1982	"Yezhu Vannamai"	Premji Amaran		Karthik
Kutti Pisasu	1983	"Ambadhu Kilo"	Deva		Krishnaraj
Pen Singam	1984	"Aaha Veenaiyil"	Deva	M. Karunanidhi	S. P. Balasubrahmanyam
Kola Kolaya Mundhirika	1985	"Oru Varam"	Selvaganesh	Francis Kruba	S. P. Balasubrahmanyam
Yathumaagi	1986	"Parthadum"	James Vasanthan		Vijay Yesudas
Unakkaga En Kadhal	1987	"Unakkaka En Kadhal"	Sanjeev-Darshan		
Easan	1988	"Sugavaasi"	James Vasanthan	Yugabharathi	Malgudi Subha
Magizhchi	1989	"Selai Kattiya"	Vidyasagar		

=== 2011 ===
Film	No	Song	Composer(s)	Writer(s)	Co-artist(s)
Seedan	1990	"Oru Naal Mattum"	Dhina	P. Vijay	
Nootrenbadhu	1991	"Santhikkadha Kangalil"	Sharreth	Madhna Karky	Unni Menon
Sri Rama Rajyam	1992	"Ramayaname"	Ilaiyaraaja		
Sri Rama Rajyam	1993	"Devargal Thittikka"	Ilaiyaraaja		
Sagakkal	1994	"Ithu Varaiyil"	Thayarathnam		S. P. Balasubrahmanyam

=== 2012 ===
Film	No	Song	Composer(s)	Writer(s)	Co-artist(s)
Medhai	1995	"Ungakitta Rendukannum"	Dhina	Yugabharathi	Karthik
Soozhnilai	1996	"Uyire Uyire"	Dhina		
Sooriya Nagaram	1997	"Selladhe Jeevane"	Ron Ethan Yohann		S. P. Balasubrahmanyam
Maalai Pozhudhin Mayakathilaey	1998	"Yen Uyirey"(Reprsie)	Achu		

=== 2013 ===
Film	No	Song	Composer(s)	Writer(s)	Co-artist(s)
Masani	1999	"Uyire Raagam"	S N Fazil		
Thirumathi Thamizh	2000	"Thamizh Thamizh"(Duet)	S. A. Rajkumar		S. A. Rajkumar, S. P. Balasubrahmanyam
Thirumathi Thamizh	2001	"Thamizh Thamizh"(Female)	S. A. Rajkumar		

=== 2014 ===
Film	No	Song	Composer(s)	Writer(s)	Co-artist(s)
Amara Kaaviyam	2002	"Mounam Pesum"	Ghibran		Sowmya Mahadevan

=== 2015 ===
Film	No	Song	Composer(s)	Writer(s)	Co-artist(s)
O Kadhal Kanmani	2003	"Malargal Ketten"	A. R. Rahman	Vairamuthu	A. R. Rahman
Kanchana 2	2004	"Motta Paiyaa"	S. Thaman		Sooraj Santhosh
Rudhramadevi	2005	"Rajathi Raja"	Ilaiyaraaja		Senthil, S. P. Balasubrahmanyam
Rudhramadevi	2006	"Anthapurathil"	Ilaiyaraaja		Sadhana Sargam, Chinmayi
Pallikoodam Pogamale	2007	"Nilavukku Vaanam"	Samson Kottoor		

=== 2016 ===
Film	No	Song	Composer(s)	Writer(s)	Co-artist(s)
Sethupathi	2008	"Konji Pesida Venaam"	Nivas K. Prasanna	Na.Muthukumar	Sriram Parthasarathy
Pugazh	2009	"Vizhigalil Vizhundhavalo"	Vivek-Mervin		Hariharan, Vivek Siva
Kodi	2010	"Ariraro"	Santhosh Narayanan	Vivek	

=== 2018 ===
Film	No	Song	Composer(s)	Writer(s)	Co-artist(s)
Amutha	2011	"Kanna Enthen"	Arun Gopan	G.Ra	
Diya	2012	"Karuve"	Sam CS	Madha Karky	
Party	2013	"Kodi Mangani"	Premgi Amaren	Gangai Amaran	S. P. Balasubrahmanyam

=== 2019 ===
Film	No	Song	Composer(s)	Writer(s)	Co-artist(s)
Azhiyatha Kolangal 2	2014	"Iruvizhiyil Eerama"	Aravind Siddhartha	Vairamuthu	
Market Raja MBBS	2015	"Kanne Karuvizhiye"	Simon K. King		
Thiruttu Kalyanam	2016	"Kulamagalae Kulamagalae"	Vaidhhy		Harish Raghavendra

=== 2020 ===
Film	No	Song	Composer(s)	Writer(s)	Co-artist(s)
Kanni Raasi	2017	"Kannane"	Vishal Chandrashekhar		
Oh Andha Naatkal	2018	"Ini Oru Thollayum"	James Vasanthan	Subramania Bharati	
Walter	2019	"Yaarai Thedi"	Dharma Prakash		

=== 2021 ===
Film	No	Song	Composer(s)	Writer(s)	Co-artist(s)
Annaatthe	2020	"Yennuyire"(Female)	D. Imman	Thamarai	
Marakkar: Lion of the Arabian Sea	2021	"Kannae Kunyaali"	Ronnie Raphael	R. P. Bala	

=== 2022 ===
Film	No	Song	Composer(s)	Writer(s)	Co-artist(s)
Varisu	2022	"Soul of Varisu"	Thaman S	Vivek	Solo

=== 2023 ===
Film	No	Song	Composer(s)	Writer(s)	Co-artist(s)
Ponniyin Selvan: II	2023	"Veera Raja Veera"	A. R. Rahman	Ilango Krishnan	Shankar Mahadevan, Harini

=== 2024 ===
Film	No	Song	Composer(s)	Writer(s)	Co-artist(s)
Guardian	2024	"Guardian - Theme Song"	Sam C. S.		
J Baby	2025	"Yaar Padalai"	Tony Britto	Vivek	
Mazaiyil Nanaigiren	2026	"Kaalam Irukkum Varai"	Vishnu Prasad	Lalithanand	Vishnu Prasad

=== 2025 ===
Film	No	Song	Composer(s)	Writer(s)	Co-artist(s)
Trauma	2027	"Thaalilo"	R. S. Rajprathap	Magesh Balakrishnan	R. S. Rajprathap
The Door	2028	"Ennuyire Ennuyire"	Varun Unni	Ilango Krishnan	
DNA	2029	"Vaa En Uyir Poove"	Sathyaprakash	Uma Devi	Sathyaprakash
Angammal	2030	"Chendipoova"	Mohammed Maqbool Mansoor	Muthamil	

== Non-film songs ==
Year	Album	Song	Composer(s)	Writer(s)	Co-artist(s)	Notes
1997	Anbe....India	"Paara Ushar"	Biddu	Pirai Sudan	Solo	Tamil Version of Disco Deewane by Pakistani Pop Singer Nazia Hasan
1997	Anbe....India	"Paarthal Kaangal"	Biddu	Pirai Sudan	Solo	Tamil Version of "Aisa Hota Hai"
1997	Anbe....India	"Paarthal Kaangal" (Dialogue Version)	Biddu	Pirai Sudan, Shaan, Sagarika	Shaan, Sagarika	Tamil Version of "Aisa Hota Hai"
2003	India Today, Vol. 2: Bollywood & Koliwood Film Songs	"Ada Kungama Poo"	Tony Tape	Veilumuth Chitralekha	Mano	featured in Far Cry 4
2003	India Today, Vol. 2: Bollywood & Koliwood Film Songs	"Katti Kalandal"	Tony Tape	Veilumuth Chitralekha	Mano	featured in Just Dance 2 and Far Cry 4

== Television ==
=== TV series title songs ===
Year	Series	Song	Composer(s)	Writer(s)	Co-artist(s)
1998	Nimmadhi Ungal Choice – Part 1	"Nimmadhi Nimmadhi"	Chandrabose	Vairamuthu	S. P. B.
1998	Akshaya	"Oru Manathai"			
2001	Kavyanjali	"Paasathil Irandu"	Aravind Siddhartha		
2002	Nagamma	"Punnamilona Vennela Vana"	Dhina		
2002	Annamalai	"Uyirgal Pirandhadhu"	Dhina		KK
2003	Anandham	"Anandham"	Bharathwaj		
2005	Selvi	"Selvi"	Dhina		
2005	Nimmathi	"Nimmadhi O Nimmadhi"	Bharathwaj		
2006	Anjali				
2006	Naanayam	"Naanayam"	Bharathwaj		
2007	Paasam	"Paasam"			
2008	Naanal	"Nadhi Irundhal"	Dhina		
2008	Porandha Veeda Pugundha Veeda	"Porandha Veeda"	Chandrabose		
2009	Kalyanam				
2009	Thangamana Purushan	"Thangamana Purushan"	Deva		
2012	Pillai Nila				
2013	Vani Rani	"Enna Thavam Senjen Amma"	C. Sathya		
2020	Kannana Kanne	"Kannana Kanne"			
2021	Kayal	"Kanne Kanne Kannin Maniye"			
2022	Anandha Ragam	"Nenjikula Nooru Aasa"			
2023	Poova Thalaiya	"Thaaippolave Mela Thalattuval"			Namitha Babu
2024	Malli	"Sirithu Vaazha Vendum"			

== Private albums ==
- 2002 – "Senthamizh Naadenum" for Jaya TV (duet with Srinivas)
- 2021 – "Thalaattu" for Vairamuthu's Naatpadu Theral (along with P. Susheela and Harini)

== Telugu songs ==
=== 1980s ===
==== 1983 ====
Film	Song	Composer(s)	Writer(s)	Co-artist(s)
Pallavi Anu Pallavi	"Kanulu Kanulu"	Ilaiyaraaja	Rajasri	S. P. Balasubrahmanyam

==== 1986 ====
Film	Song	Composer(s)	Writer(s)	Co-artist(s)
Karpoora Deepam	"Ye Mandaramlo"	K. Chakravarthy	Veturi	K. J. Yesudas

==== 1988 ====
Film	Song	Composer(s)	Writer(s)	Co-artist(s)
Aakhari Poratam	"Abba Deenisoku"	Ilaiyaraaja	Veturi Sundara Ramamurhty	S. P. Balasubrahmanyam
Aakhari Poratam	"Eppudu Eppudu"	Ilaiyaraaja	Veturi Sundara Ramamurhty	S. P. Balasubrahmanyam
Aakhari Poratam	"Gundelo Thakita"	Ilaiyaraaja	Jonnavittula	S. P. Balasubrahmanyam

=== 2000s ===
==== 2000 ====
Film	Song	Composer(s)	Writer(s)	Co-artist(s)
Kodanda Ramudu	"Mounika Mounika"	S. V. Krishna Reddy	Veturi	Shankar Mahadevan
Kodanda Ramudu	"Manipuri Nadakalatho"	S. V. Krishna Reddy	Veturi	Shankar Mahadevan
Kodanda Ramudu	"Kodanda Ramayyaku"	S. V. Krishna Reddy	Veturi	M. G. Sreekumar
Kodanda Ramudu	"Ee Lahiri Pade"	S. V. Krishna Reddy	Veturi	Udit Narayan
Annayya	"Baava Chandamaamalu"	Mani Sharma	Jonnavittula	S. P. Balasubrahmanyam, S. P. B. Charan, Teja
Postman	"Lahiri Lahiri"	Vandemataram Srinivas	Suddala Ashok Teja	Udit Narayan
Postman	"Rajahamsa Cheera"	Vandemataram Srinivas	Suddala Ashok Teja	K. J. Yesudas
Postman	"Kuku Kokilamma"	Vandemataram Srinivas	Guru Charan	K. J. Yesudas
Vamsoddharakudu	"Kondapalli Bomma"	Koti	Ghantadi Krishna	S. P. Balasubrahmanyam
Vamsoddharakudu	"Andala Prayam"	Koti	Sirivennela Seetharama Sastry	S. P. Balasubrahmanyam
Vamsoddharakudu	"Gudi Gantalu"	Koti	M. S. Reddy	S. P. Balasubrahmanyam
Vamsoddharakudu	"Nee Choopu Bhale"	Koti	Suddala Ashok Teja	S. P. Balasubrahmanyam
Vamsoddharakudu	"Budi Budi Chinukula"	Koti	Bhuvanachandra	Ramu
Kalisundam Raa	"Manasu Manasu"	S. A. Rajkumar	Veturi	S. P. Balasubrahmanyam
Kshemamga Velli Labhamga Randi	"Adavallamandi Memu"	Vandemataram Srinivas	Chandrabose	Mano
Hands Up	"Lahiri Lahiri"	Sashi Preetam	Veturi	Sowmya Raoh
Chala Bagundi	"Daayamma Daayi"	Koti	Samaveda Shanmuga Sharma	S. P. Balasubrahmanyam
Chala Bagundi	"Daaham Daaha"	Koti	Bhuvanachandra	S. P. Balasubrahmanyam
Chala Bagundi	"Eai Rukkamma Chukkamma"	Koti	Sirivennela Seetharama Sastry	
Ravanna	"Nuvvante Chala Ishtam"	S. A. Rajkumar	Sirivennela Seetharama Sastry	Rajesh Krishnan
Ravanna	"Okey Oka Aasha"	S. A. Rajkumar	Sirivennela Seetharama Sastry	Udit Narayan
Nuvvu Vasthavani	"Komma Komma"	S. A. Rajkumar	ES Murthy	Hariharan
Nuvvu Vasthavani	"Paatala Pallakivai"	S. A. Rajkumar	Sirivennela Seetharama Sastry	
Yuvaraju	"Tholivalape"	Ramana Gogula	Veturi	Hariharan, Nanditha
Yuvaraju	"Haira Haira Debba"	Ramana Gogula	Veturi	Udit Narayan
Yuvaraju	"Gunthalakkadi"	Ramana Gogula	Veturi	S. P. Balasubrahmanyam
Manoharam	"Sari Sari Natanala"	Mani Sharma	Veturi	Shankar Mahadevan
Manoharam	"Puchha Puvvula"	Mani Sharma	Veturi	Parthasarathy
Manoharam	"Guppedu Gundala"	Mani Sharma	Veturi	S. P. Balasubrahmanyam
Manoharam	"Bharatha Maatha"	Mani Sharma	Veturi	Srinivas
Maa Pelliki Randi	"Nee Kosam"	S. A. Rajkumar	Veturi	Rajesh Krishnan
Maa Pelliki Randi	"Nuvve Naaku"	S. A. Rajkumar	Veturi	Rajesh Krishnan
Maa Pelliki Randi	"Hello Chalaki"	S. A. Rajkumar	Veturi	Mano
Maa Pelliki Randi	"Mama Chandamama"	S. A. Rajkumar	Veturi	P. Unnikrishnan
Goppinti Alludu	"Muddoche Gopala"	Koti	Surendra Krishna	
Goppinti Alludu	"Premisthe Entho Great"	Koti	Bhuvanachandra	Devan
Goppinti Alludu	"Vachestundo Chestundo"	Koti	Bhaskarabhatla	S. P. Balasubrahmanyam
Pelli Sambandham	"Thalapaaga Nethina"	S. A. Rajkumar	Chandrabose	S. P. Balasubrahmanyam
Kauravudu	"Ku Ku Ku"	Mani Sharma	Chintapalli Ramana	
Kauravudu	"Amma Padani"	Mani Sharma	Chintapalli Ramana	
Manasunna Maaraju	"Maaghamasam"	Vandemataram Srinivas	Chandrabose	Udit Narayan
Moodu Mukkalaata	"Palakova"	M. M. Srilekha	Veturi	S. P. Balasubrahmanyam
Moodu Mukkalaata	"Vaana Kanyaka"	M. M. Srilekha	Veturi	S. P. Balasubrahmanyam
Moodu Mukkalaata	"Raashi Chooste"	M. M. Srilekha	Sirivennela Seetharama Sastry	Udit Narayan
Ninne Premistha	"Prema Endukani"	S. A. Rajkumar	E. S. Murthy	Rajesh Krishnan
Ninne Premistha	"Gudi Gantalu"	S. A. Rajkumar	Ghantadi Krishna	Rajesh Krishnan
Ninne Premistha	"Koila Paata"	S. A. Rajkumar	Sirivennela Seetharama Sastry	S. P. Balasubrahmanyam
Ninne Premistha	"Oka Devata"	S. A. Rajkumar	Venigalla Rambabu	Parthasarathy
Rayalaseema Ramanna Chowdary	"Buchimallu Buchimallu"	Mani Sharma	Suddala Ashok Teja	Sukhwinder Singh
Rayalaseema Ramanna Chowdary	"Chamaku Chamaku"	Mani Sharma	Sirivennela Seetharama Sastry	Udit Narayan
Azad	"Chemma Chakka"	Mani Sharma	Sirivennela Seetharama Sastry	S. P. Balasubrahmanyam, Harini
Azad	"Sudigaalilo"	Mani Sharma	Veturi	Hariharan
Azad	"Hai Hai Naayaka"	Mani Sharma	Veturi	Sukhwinder Singh
Vamsi	"Veyinchukunte Baaguntadi"	Mani Sharma	Bhuvanachandra	Sukhwinder Singh
Nuvve Kavali	"Anaganaga Aakasam"	Koti	Sirivennela Seetharama Sastry	P. Jayachandran
Nuvve Kavali	"Kallaloki Kallu Petti"	Koti	Sirivennela Seetharama Sastry	
Devullu	"Nee Prema Kore"	Vandemataram Srinivas	Jonnavittula	Swarnalatha
Devullu	"Shanti Niketana"	Vandemataram Srinivas	Jonnavittula	Rajesh Krishnan
Chirunavvutho	"Kanulu Kalisaaye"	Mani Sharma	Bhuvanachandra	Hariharan
Chirunavvutho	"Sonare Sonare"	Mani Sharma	Bhuvanachandra	Shankar Mahadevan
Maa Annayya	"Maina Emainaave"	S. A. Rajkumar	Sirivennela Seetharama Sastry	P. Unnikrishnan
Maa Annayya	"Maa Logililo Pandedantha"	S. A. Rajkumar	Sirivennela Seetharama Sastry	S. P. Balasubrahmanyam, Sujatha Mohan, Unni Menon
Maa Annayya	"Thaajaga Maa Intlo"	S. A. Rajkumar	Sirivennela Seetharama Sastry	Mano, Sujatha Mohan
Sakutumba Saparivaara Sametam	"Puttinti Thulasiga"	S. V. Krishna Reddy	Suddala Ashok Teja	S. P. Balasubrahmanyam
Sakutumba Saparivaara Sametam	"Ollanta Thullinta"	S. V. Krishna Reddy	Suddala Ashok Teja	S. P. Balasubrahmanyam
Sakutumba Saparivaara Sametam	"Manasanta Manasupadi"	S. V. Krishna Reddy	Suddala Ashok Teja	S. P. Balasubrahmanyam
Sakutumba Saparivaara Sametam	"Andachandala Chandamama"	S. V. Krishna Reddy	Suddala Ashok Teja	S. P. Balasubrahmanyam
Tirumala Tirupati Venkatesa	"Nadumu Ompulo"	Vandemataram Srinivas	Sankarambadi Sundarachari	Rajesh Krishnan

==== 2001 ====
Film	Song	Composer(s)	Writer(s)	Co-artist(s)
Mrugaraju	"Hungama Hungama"	Mani Sharma	Kulasekhar	Raghu Kunche
Devi Putrudu	"Akasamloni"	Mani Sharma	Jonnavittula	S. P. Balasubrahmanyam
Navvuthu Bathakalira	"Konaseema Kurradaniro"	Devi Sri Prasad	Sirivennela Seetharama Sastry	S. P. Balasubrahmanyam
Suri	"Yemaayindo"	Vidyasagar	Vennelakanti	
Priyamaina Neeku	"Manasuna"	Shivasankar	Bhuvanachandra	
Murari	"Cheppamma Cheppamma"	Mani Sharma	Sirivennela Seetharama Sastry	
Deevinchandi	"Paruvala Pavurama"	S. A. Rajkumar	Kulasekhar	S. P. Balasubrahmanyam
Eduruleni Manishi	"Enadaina Anukunnana"	S. A. Rajkumar	Sirivennela Seetharama Sastry	Hariharan
Eduruleni Manishi	"Manasannadhi Annadhi"	S. A. Rajkumar	Pothula Ravi Kiran	Hariharan
Preminchu	"24 Carat Golden Babu"	M. M. Srilekha	Sirivennela Seetharama Sastry	S. P. Balasubrahmanyam
Preminchu	"Hai Amma"	M. M. Srilekha	Sirivennela Seetharama Sastry	S. P. Balasubrahmanyam
Preminchu	"Kantene Amma"	M. M. Srilekha	Sirivennela Seetharama Sastry	S. P. Balasubrahmanyam
Preminchu	"Maa Gundelalo"	M. M. Srilekha	Sirivennela Seetharama Sastry	S. P. Balasubrahmanyam
Preminchu	"Nooru Kotla"	M. M. Srilekha	Sirivennela Seetharama Sastry	S. P. Balasubrahmanyam
Preminchu	"Swagatham Yuva Premikulaku"	M. M. Srilekha	Sirivennela Seetharama Sastry	S. P. Balasubrahmanyam
Preminchu	"Tholisari Ninu Choosi"	M. M. Srilekha	Sirivennela Seetharama Sastry	S. P. Balasubrahmanyam
Ammayi Kosam	"B. A.lu Chadivina"	Vandemataram Srinivas	Samavedam Shanmukha Sarma	S. P. Balasubrahmanyam, Vandemataram Srinivas
Ninnu Choodalani	"Oopirochina Bapu Bomma"	S. A. Rajkumar	Sirivennela Seetharama Sastry	Rajesh Krishnan
Bava Nachadu	"Chandamama Chandamama"	M. M. Keeravani	Chandrabose	Udit Narayan, Harini
Bhalevadivi Basu	"Ayyare Ayyare"	Mani Sharma	Sirivennela Seetharama Sastry	S. P. Balasubrahmanyam
Bhalevadivi Basu	"Bava Bava"	Mani Sharma	Sirivennela Seetharama Sastry	Sujatha Mohan
Kalisi Naduddam	"Atu Itu Chudake"	S. A. Rajkumar	Sirivennela Seetharama Sastry	S. P. Balasubrahmanyam
Kalisi Naduddam	"Yenati Sarasami"	S. A. Rajkumar	Sirivennela Seetharama Sastry	
Tholi Valapu	"Paalato Kadigina"	Vandemataram Srinivas	Chandrabose	Hariharan
Akasa Veedhilo	"Yem Strokichavu Guru"	M. M. Keeravani	Bhuvanachandra	S. P. Balasubrahmanyam
Naalo Unna Prema	"Gopala Krishnudamma"	Koti	Sirivennela Seetharama Sastry	S. P. Balasubrahmanyam
Naalo Unna Prema	"O Naa Priyathama"	Koti	Sirivennela Seetharama Sastry	Mano
Naalo Unna Prema	"Manasa O Manasa"	Koti	Sirivennela Seetharama Sastry	
Naalo Unna Prema	"Veeche Chirugaali"	Koti	Sirivennela Seetharama Sastry	
Nuvvu Naaku Nachav	"Naa Choope Ninu"	Koti	Sirivennela Seetharama Sastry	Sriram Prabhu
Nuvvu Naaku Nachav	"Okkasari Cheppaleva"	Koti	Sirivennela Seetharama Sastry	Kumar Sanu
Adhipathi	"Puvvulanagadu"	Koti	Bhuvanachandra	Udit Narayan
Adhipathi	"Kadapalo Kannesa"	Koti	Bhuvanachandra	Udit Narayan
Adhipathi	"Aasa Padutunnadi"	Koti	Bhuvanachandra	Sukhwinder Singh
Adhipathi	"Abbabba Tuntari Gaali"	Koti	Bhuvanachandra	Kumar Sanu
Chiranjeevulu	"Anuragam Anubandham"	A. B. Murali	Siva Ganesh	Srinivas
Chirujallu	"Radhe Radhe"	Vandemataram Srinivas	Sirivennela Seetharama Sastry	S. P. Balasubrahmanyam, Vishala
Chirujallu	"Bhoodevi Bugga"	Veturi	Vandemataram Srinivas	
Student No: 1	"Paddanandi Premalo"	M. M. Keeravani	Chandrabose	Udit Narayan
Student No: 1	"Yemetti Chesaado"	M. M. Keeravani	Chandrabose	Udit Narayan
Student No: 1	"Kaastha Ninnu"	M. M. Keeravani	Chandrabose	S. P. Balasubrahmanyam
Anandam	"Evuraina Epudaina"	Devi Sri Prasad	Sirivennela Seetharama Sastry	
Daddy	"Naa Pranamaa"	S. A. Rajkumar	Sirivennela Seetharama Sastry	Udit Narayan
Daddy	"Vaana Vaana"	Chandrabose		Udit Narayan
Manasantha Nuvve	"Kita Kita Thalupulu"	R. P. Patnaik	Sirivennela Seetharama Sastry	
Veedekkadi Mogudandi!	"Paalu Ready"	Koti	Sirivennela Seetharama Sastry	Udit Narayan
Veedekkadi Mogudandi!	"Thaluku Thaluku"	Koti	Sirivennela Seetharama Sastry	Udit Narayan
Jabili	"Ganga Yamuna Godari"	S. V. Krishna Reddy	Suddala Ashok Teja	KK
Jabili	"Chiguraku Evaro"	S. V. Krishna Reddy	Suddala Ashok Teja	P. Unnikrishnan
Paravasam	"Neevena Jaatheeya"	A. R. Rahman	A. M. Rathnam	Balaram
Bhadrachalam	"Okate Jananam"	Vandemataram Srinivas	Sirivennela Seetharama Sastry	Shankar Mahadevan
Hanuman Junction	"Konaseemallo O Koila"	Suresh Peters	Veturi	Srinivas
Hanuman Junction	"Golmaal Golmaal"	Suresh Peters	Veturi	Mano, M. G. Sreekumar, Sujatha Mohan
Darling Darling	"Nari Nari"	Koti	Bhuvanachandra	Tippu
Ishtam	"Nuvvante Ishtamani"	DJ Gopinath	Sirivennela Seetharama Sastry	Hariharan
Ishtam	"Evaraina Chusara"	DJ Gopinath	Sirivennela Seetharama Sastry	Hariharan
Ishtam	"Chiru Chiru Nagavula"	DJ Gopinath	Bhuvanachandra	

==== 2002 ====
Film	Song	Composer(s)	Writer(s)	Co-artist(s)
Seema Simham	"Rendu Jalla Paapa"	Mani Sharma	Bhuvanachandra	Shankar Mahadevan
Priya Nestama	"Komma Meedha"	Bharani	Chandrabose	S. P. Balasubrahmanyam
Nee Premakai	"Vendi Mabbula"	S. A. Rajkumar	Sirivennela Seetharama Sastry	Rajesh Krishnan
Nee Premakai	"O Prema Swagatham"	S. A. Rajkumar	Sirivennela Seetharama Sastry	Rajesh Krishnan
Nee Premakai	"Mandakini Mandakini"	S. A. Rajkumar	Sirivennela Seetharama Sastry	Rajesh Krishnan
Aadi	"Tholi Pilupey"	Mani Sharma	Chandrabose	S. P. Balasubrahmanyam
Vasu	"Nammave Ammayi"	Harris Jayaraj	Sirivennela Seetharama Sastry	Harish Raghavendra
Vasu	"Vaale Vaale Poddula"	Harris Jayaraj	Potula Ravikiran	S. P. Balasubrahmanyam, Karthik
Lahiri Lahiri Lahirilo	"Kallaloki Kallu Petti"	M. M. Keeravani	Sirivennela Seetharama Sastry	Udit Narayan
Lahiri Lahiri Lahirilo	"Ohoho Chilakamma"	M. M. Keeravani	Sirivennela Seetharama Sastry	Udit Narayan
Lahiri Lahiri Lahirilo	"Kilmire"	M. M. Keeravani	Sirivennela Seetharama Sastry	Sukhwinder Singh
Lahiri Lahiri Lahirilo	"Manthramedho"	M. M. Keeravani	Sirivennela Seetharama Sastry	Kumar Sanu
Tappu Chesi Pappu Koodu	"Brundavanamali"	M. M. Keeravani	Jonnavittula	K. J. Yesudas
Tappu Chesi Pappu Koodu	"Vaana Kodtandi"	M. M. Keeravani	Guru Charan	Udit Narayan
Neetho	"Pannendintiki"	Vidyasagar	Chandrabose	Vijay Yesudas
Indra	"Radhe Govinda"	Mani Sharma	Bhuvanachandra	Udit Narayan
Sontham	"Thelusuna"	Devi Sri Prasad	Sirivennela Seetharama Sastry	
Holi	"Priyathama"	R. P. Patnaik	Kulasekhar	S. P. Balasubrahmanyam
Okato Number Kurraadu	"Orey Nuvvu"	M. M. Keeravani	Suddala Ashok Teja	S. P. B. Charan
Okato Number Kurraadu	"Nemali Kannoda"	M. M. Keeravani	Suddala Ashok Teja	Udit Narayan
Okato Number Kurraadu	"Enni Janmalettinaa"	M. M. Keeravani	Suddala Ashok Teja	S. P. Balasubrahmanyam
Chennakesava Reddy	"Bakara Bakara"	Manisharma	Chandrabose	Udit Narayan
Chennakesava Reddy	"Telupu Telupu"	Manisharma	Chandrabose	S. P. Balasubrahmanyam
Nuvve.. Nuvve...	"Nuvve Nuvve Kavalantundi"	Koti	Sirivennela Seetharama Sastry	
Pilisthe Palukutha	"Rotte Kavalante"	M. M. Keeravani	Kulasekhar	Karthik
Pilisthe Palukutha	"Bujjulu Bujjulu"	M. M. Keeravani	Kulasekhar	Karthik
Pilisthe Palukutha	"Manasa Ottu"	M. M. Keeravani	Sirivennela Seetharama Sastry	
Khadgam	"Aha Allari"	Devi Sri Prasad	Sirivennela Seetharama Sastry	Raqueeb Alam
Thotti Gang	"Vechhani Vechhani Deham"	Devi Sri Prasad	Sirivennela Seetharama Sastry	Rajesh Krishnan
Manmadhudu	"Na Manasune"	Devi Sri Prasad	Sirivennela Seetharama Sastry	S. P. Balasubrahmanyam

==== 2003 ====
Film	Song	Composer(s)	Writer(s)	Co-artist(s)
Ee Abbai Chala Manchodu	"Oh Sari"	M. M. Keeravani	Bhuvanachandra	S. P. Balasubrahmanyam
Okkadu	"Hay Re Hai"	Mani Sharma	Sirivennela Seetharama Sastry	Karthik
Juniors	"Hello Hello"	Chakri	Bhuvanachandra	Shankar Mahadevan
Vijayam	"Kusalamaa"	Koti	Sirivennela Seetharama Sastry	Rajesh Krishnan
Raghavendra	"Calcutta Pan Vesina"	Mani Sharma	Suddala Ashok Teja	Shankar Mahadevan
Dil	"Peddaloddantunna"	R. P. Patnaik	Peddada Murthy	Sri Ram
Palnati Brahmanayudu	"Bandarulo"	Mani Sharma	Veturi	Shankar Mahadevan
Ninne Ishtapaddanu	"Ku Ku Ku"	R. P. Patnaik	Sirivennela Seetharama Sastry	S. P. Balasubrahmanyam
Ninne Ishtapaddanu	"Emanatave O Manasa"	R. P. Patnaik	Sirivennela Seetharama Sastry	S. P. Balasubrahmanyam
Simhadri	"Chiraaku Anuko"	M. M. Keeravani	Chandrabose	S. P. B. Charan
Simhadri	"Nuvvu Whistlesthe"	M. M. Keeravani	Chandrabose	Tippu
Vasantam	"Gaali Chirugaali"	S. A. Rajkumar	Sirivennela Seetharama Sastry	
Vasantam	"O Jabili"	S. A. Rajkumar	Kulasekhar	
Praanam	"Snehama Swapnama"	Kamalakar	Sri Sai Harsha	Hariharan
Praanam	"Vaataapi"	Kamalakar	E. S. Murthy	
Dongodu	"Dum Dum Dum"	Vidyasagar	Sirivennela Seetharama Sastry	Valisha Babji
Neeku Nenu Naaku Nuvvu	"Naa Chirunama"	R. P. Patnaik	Kulasekhar	Rajesh Krishnan
Neeku Nenu Naaku Nuvvu	"Premakanna Goppadinka"	R. P. Patnaik	Kulasekhar	Shankar Mahadevan
Neeku Nenu Naaku Nuvvu	"Pellaade Teeralannaru"	R. P. Patnaik	Kulasekhar	S. P. Balasubrahmanyam
Seetayya	"Bussekki Vastaavo"	M. M. Keeravani	Chandrabose	S. P. Balasubrahmanyam
Seetayya	"Ammathodu"	M. M. Keeravani	Chandrabose	Udit Narayan
Tagore	"Chinnaga Chinnaga"	Mani Sharma	Chandrabose	Hariharan
Tagore	"Gappu Chippu"	Mani Sharma	Suddala Ashok Teja	Mano
Ela Cheppanu	"Ee Kshanam Oke Oka"	Koti	Sirivennela Seetharama Sastry	
Ela Cheppanu	"Prati Nijam"	Koti	Sirivennela Seetharama Sastry	
Ela Cheppanu	"Manninchu O Prema"	Koti	Sirivennela Seetharama Sastry	Udit Narayan
Maa Alludu Very Good	"Mutyala Pallakilo"	M. M. Keeravani	Chandrabose	S. P. B. Charan
Maa Alludu Very Good	"Nee Dumpatega"	M. M. Keeravani	Chandrabose	Udit Narayan
Tiger Harischandra Prasad	"Kadeddula"	S. A. Rajkumar	Jaladi Raja Rao	S. P. Balasubrahmanyam

==== 2004 ====
Film	Song	Composer(s)	Writer(s)	Co-artist(s)
Varsham	"Sinuku Ravvulo"	Devi Sri Prasad	Sirivennela Seetharama Sastry	Raqueeb Alam
Malliswari	"Gundello Gulabilaa"	Koti	Sirivennela Seetharama Sastry	Shankar Mahadevan
Malliswari	"Cheli Soku"	Koti	Sirivennela Seetharama Sastry	KK
Jai	"Nee Kosame"	Anup Rubens	Kulasekhar	Mallikarjun
Nenunnanu	"Ee Shwasalo"	M. M. Keeravani	Sirivennela Seetharama Sastry	
Nenunnanu	"Ettago Unnadi"	M. M. Keeravani	Sirivennela Seetharama Sastry	Tippu
Puttintiki Ra Chelli	"Chamanthi Poobanthi"	S. A. Rajkumar	Sai Sri Harsha	
Puttintiki Ra Chelli	"Anuragam Chese"	S. A. Rajkumar	Sai Sri Harsha	S. A. Rajkumar
Puttintiki Ra Chelli	"Seethakoka Chilaka"	S. A. Rajkumar	Sai Sri Harsha	Mano
Puttintiki Ra Chelli	"Anna Anna Puttintiki"	S. A. Rajkumar	Sai Sri Harsha	S. P. Balasubrahmanyam
Dost	"Eppa Saara Kottaro"	Koti	Sirivennela Seetharama Sastry	Karthik, Hanumanta Rao
Dost	"Malli Malli"	Koti	Sirivennela Seetharama Sastry	Udit Narayan
Adavi Ramudu	"Jinka Veta"	Mani Sharma	Sirivennela Seetharama Sastry	Hariharan
Adavi Ramudu	"Adugesthene"	Mani Sharma	Sirivennela Seetharama Sastry	Malathy Lakshman, Sangeetha Sajith
Samba	"Namaste Namaste"	Mani Sharma	Chandrabose	Tippu
Ammayi Bagundi	"Krishna Krishna"	M. M. Srilekha	Kulasekhar	Udit Narayan
Ammayi Bagundi	"Paatala Pallakilo"	M. M. Srilekha	Kulasekhar	Shivaji
Sri Anjaneyam	"Slokam"	Mani Sharma	Traditional	Kalpana
Donga Dongadi	"Vana Vana"	Dhina	Kulasekhar	
Naa Autograph	"Mounamgane Yedagamani"	M. M. Keeravani	Chandrabose	M. M. Keeravani
Arjun	"Oh Cheli"	Mani Sharma	Veturi	Karthik
Arjun	"Dum Dumrea"	Mani Sharma	Veturi	S. P. Balasubrahmanyam
Siva Shankar	"Krishna Nuvvu Raaku"	Ilaiyaraaja	Chandrabose	Hariharan
Sye	"Nalla Nallani Kalla"	M. M. Keeravani	Siva Shakti Datta	M. M. Keeravani
Letha Manasulu	"Thannana Thannaana"	M. M. Keeravani	M. M. Keeravani	M. M. Keeravani
Anand	"Yamunatheeram"	K. M. Radha Krishnan	Veturi	Hariharan
Anand	"Yedalo Ganam"	K. M. Radha Krishnan	Veturi	Hariharan
Swarabhishekam	"Shriman Manohara"	Vidyasagar	Veturi	Sriram Parthasarathy
Swarabhishekam	"Mangalam"	Vidyasagar	Veturi	Sriram Parthasarathy
Swarabhishekam	"Idi Naadani Adi Needani"	Vidyasagar	Veturi	S. P. Balasubrahmanyam
Swarabhishekam	"Nee Chenthe Oka"	Vidyasagar	Veturi	Mano
Swarabhishekam	"Ramavinodhi Vallabha"	Vidyasagar	Veturi	Madhu Balakrishnan, Mano, Sriram Parthasarathy
Sakhiya	"O Chandrama"	Mani Sharma	Sahiti	Mallikarjun
Leela Mahal Centre	"Sirimalle Puvvalle"	S. A. Rajkumar	Suddala Ashok Teja	
Vijayendra Varma	"Siggu Paaparo"	Koti	Suddala Ashok Teja	Tippu
Vijayendra Varma	"Maisamma Maisamma"	Koti	Veturi	Udit Narayan
Vijayendra Varma	"Mandapetalo"	Koti	Chandrabose	Shankar Mahadevan

==== 2005 ====
Film	Song	Composer(s)	Writer(s)	Co-artist(s)
Naa Alludu	"Nadumu Choosthe"	Devi Sri Prasad	Veturi	Tippu
Sankranti	"Ade Pade"	S. A. Rajkumar	Pothula Ravikiran	Karthik
Sankranti	"Doli Doli"	S. A. Rajkumar	E. S. Murthy	Shankar Mahadevan, Kalpana, S. A. Rajkumar
Aunanna Kadanna	"Suvvi Suvvi"	R. P. Patnaik	Kulasekhar	Mallikarjun
Subash Chandra Bose	"Abraka Dabra"	Mani Sharma	Chandrabose	Rajesh Krishnan
Athanokkade	"Gundelalo"	Mani Sharma	Sai Sri Harsha	Mallikarjun
Bhadra	"Sa Sa Sye"	Devi Sri Prasad	Sirivennela Seetharama Sastry	Karthik
Narasimhudu	"Singu Singu"	Mani Sharma	Bhuvanachandra	S. P. Balasubrahmanyam
Jagapati	"Cheera Kattu Vayasu"	M. M. Keeravani	Chandrabose	Tippu
Jagapati	"Chandamamaki Kaluva"	M. M. Keeravani	Chandrabose	Tippu
Jagapati	"Choose Koddi Ninne"	M. M. Keeravani	Chandrabose	S. P. Balasubrahmanyam
Kanchanamala Cable TV	"O Neelaveni"	K. M. Radha Krishnan	Veturi	S. P. Balasubrahmanyam
Athadu	"Neetho Cheppana"	Mani Sharma	Sirivennela Seetharama Sastry	S. P. Balasubrahmanyam
Andhrudu	"Pranamlo Pranamga"	Kalyani Malik	Chandrabose	
Mogudu Pellam O Dongodu	"Chilipi Alaka"	Kabuli	Peddada Murthy	
Allari Bullodu	"Dashukunte Dhanadhan"	M. M. Keeravani	Chandrabose	Devi Sri Prasad
Allari Bullodu	"Trisha Achata Ichata"	M. M. Keeravani	Chandrabose	M. M. Keeravani
Chatrapathi	"Nallanivanni"	M. M. Keeravani	Veturi	
Chatrapathi	"Gala Gala Gala"	M. M. Keeravani	Chandrabose	Jassie Gift, Neerippal
Allari Pidugu	"Dikki Dikki"	Mani Sharma	Bhaskarabhatla	Karthik
Modati Cinema	"Urime Megham"	Swaraj	Sirivennela Seetharama Sastry	Sonu Nigam
Mahanandi	"Yemainaa"	Kamalakar	Bandaru Danayya Kavi	Hariharan
Mahanandi	"Naa Panchapraanalu"	Kamalakar	Gurucharan	S. P. Balasubrahmanyam
Mahanandi	"Etu Choosthe Atu Nuvve"	Kamalakar	Velpula Venkatesh	
Jai Chiranjeeva	"Ko Ko Kodi"	Mani Sharma	Bhuvanachandra	Udit Narayan

==== 2006 ====
Film	Song	Composer(s)	Writer(s)	Co-artist(s)
Shock	"Madhuram Madhuram"	Ajay-Atul	Veturi	S. P. Balasubrahmanyam
Rajababu	"Prema O Tholiprema"	S. A. Rajkumar	Pothula Ravikiran	Udit Narayan
Sri Ramadasu	"Charanamulane"	M. M. Keeravani	Ramadasu Keerthana	Madhu Balakrishnan
Sri Ramadasu	"Paluke Bangaramayena"	M. M. Keeravani	Ramadasu Keerthana	M. M. Keeravani
Sri Ramadasu	"Bhadra Shaila"	M. M. Keeravani	Ramadasu Keerthana	Hariharan
Sri Ramadasu	"Dhasaradhi"	M. M. Keeravani	Vedavyas	S. P. Balasubrahmanyam
10th Class	"Kannulu Rendu"	Mickey J Meyer	Kulasekhar	Karthik
Pournami	"Yevaro Choodali"	Devi Sri Prasad	Sirivennela Seetharama Sastry	
Pournami	"Yevaro Raavali"	Devi Sri Prasad	Sirivennela Seetharama Sastry	Sagar
Pournami	"Bharatha Vedamuga"	Devi Sri Prasad	Sirivennela Seetharama Sastry	
Pournami	"Muvvala Navvakala"	Devi Sri Prasad	Sirivennela Seetharama Sastry	S. P. Balasubrahmanyam
Sarada Saradaga	"Rajasa Munna Ranganayaka"	S. V. Krishna Reddy	Bhuvanachandra	Madhu Balakrishnan
Veerabhadra	"Abbabba"	Mani Sharma	Bhaskarabhatla	S. P. Balasubrahmanyam
Evandoi Srivaru	"Adiga Brahmani"	Srikanth Deva	Kulasekhar	Karthik
Godavari	"Manasa Vaacha"	K. M. Radha Krishnan	Veturi	P. Unnikrishnan
Godavari	"Manasa Gelupu"	K. M. Radha Krishnan	Veturi	Shankar Mahadevan, K. M. Radha Krishnan
Sri Krishna 2006	"Nagumomu"	M. M. Srilekha	Siva Shakthi Datta	
Vikramarkudu	"College Paapala"	M. M. Keeravani	Jonnavittula	Jassie Gift
Vikramarkudu	"Dammare Damma"	M. M. Keeravani	Jonnavittula	Viji, Tippu
Astram	"Undipo Nestamaa"	S. A. Rajkumar	Suddala Ashok Teja	Rajesh Krishnan
Ashok	"Nuvvasalu Nachale"	Mani Sharma	Bhaskarabhatla	Jassie Gift
Andala Ramudu	"Chinni Chinni"	S. A. Rajkumar	E. S. Murthy	
Indian Beauty	"Priyathama"	Joy Kelvin	Bhuvanachandra	Priyasri
Raraju	"Bangaru Chilaka"	Mani Sharma	Suddala Ashok Teja	Tippu
Samanyudu	"Maghuva Premalo"	Vandemataram Srinivas	Kaluva Krishna Sai	Naveen, Sriramprabhu
Sainikudu	"Aadapilla Aggipulla"	Harris Jayaraj	Veturi	Hariharan
Khatarnak	"Doma Kudithe"	M. M. Keeravani	Chandrabose	Shankar Mahadevan
Khatarnak	"Vestaavaa"	M. M. Keeravani	Siva Shakthi Datta	Shankar Mahadevan
Annavaram	"Aa Devudu Naakosam"	Ramana Gogula	Suddala Ashok Teja	Ramana Gogula
Abaddham	"Jaaripoyina"	Vidyasagar	Veturi	

==== 2007 ====
Film	Song	Composer(s)	Writer(s)	Co-artist(s)
Madhumasam	"Oohale"	Mani Sharma	Peddada Murthy	Karthik
Evadaithe Nakenti	"Yedho"	Chinna	Peddada Murthy	Karthik
Athili Sattibabu LKG	"Amruthavarshamlaa"	Sri Krishna	Jonnavittula	Harish Raghavendra
Aata	"Hoynaa"	Devi Sri Prasad	Sirivennela Seetharama Sastry	Karthik
Shankar Dada Zindabad	"Chandamama"	Devi Sri Prasad	Bhaskarabhatla	Venugopal
Tulasi	"Nee Kallathoti"	Devi Sri Prasad	Bhaskarabhatla	Sagar

==== 2008 ====
Film	Song	Composer(s)	Writer(s)	Co-artist(s)
Okka Magaadu	"Pattuko Pattuko"	Mani Sharma	Chandrabose	S. P. Balasubrahmanyam
Swagatam	"Manasa Mounama"	R. P. Patnaik	Veturi	Karthik
Mr. Medhavi	"Kallu Kallatho"	Chakri	Kandikonda	
Vaana	"Sirimalle Vaana"	Kamalakar	Sirivennela Seetharama Sastry	Ranjith
Vaana	"Yeduta Nilichindi"	Kamalakar	Sirivennela Seetharama Sastry	
Sundarakanda	"Okato Yeta Rendo"	Vidyasagar	Sirivennela Seetharama Sastry	
Sundarakanda	"Kalagantini"	Vidyasagar	Sirivennela Seetharama Sastry	
Nee Sukhame Ne Koruthunna	"Yemito Idhi"	Madhavapeddi Suresh	Vennelakanti	Karthik
Bhale Dongalu	"Manasulo Nuvvena"	K. M. Radha Krishnan	Ramajogayya Sastry	Udit Narayan
Bhale Dongalu	"Pasandaina Vela"	K. M. Radha Krishnan	Vennelakanti	
Kantri	"Ammaho"	Mani Sharma	Sirivennela Seetharama Sastry	Karthik
Pandurangadu	"Premavalambanam"	M. M. Keeravani	Sri Vedavyas	Vijay Yesudas
Brahmanandam Drama Company	"Yendhuko"	Sai Karthik	Vennelakanti	S. P. B. Charan
Kathanayakudu	"Om Zaraare"	G. V. Prakash Kumar	Anantha Sreeram	Daler Mehndi, Sadhana Sargam
Baladoor	"Gundello Illundhi"	K. M. Radha Krishnan	Chandrabose	N. C. Karunya
Adivishnu	"Edu Rangula Harivillu"	M. M. Srilekha	Chandrabose	Srinivas
Adivishnu	"Ee Pani Chestunna"	M. M. Srilekha	Chandrabose	Murali
Gorintaku	"Anna Chellela"	S. A. Rajkumar	Chandrabose	S. P. Balasubrahmanyam
Gorintaku	"Yeradilo Koila"	S. A. Rajkumar	Chandrabose	
Avakai Biryani	"Nadiche Yedu Adugullo"	Manikanth Kadri	Vennelakanti	Naresh Iyer
Ekaloveyudu	"Komma Kommaku"	Anil Krishna	Vennelakanti	
Vinayakudu	"Saradaga Ee Samayam"	Sam Prasan	Vanamali	P. Unnikrishnan

==== 2009 ====
Film	Song	Composer(s)	Writer(s)	Co-artist(s)
Sasirekha Parinayam	"Ninne Ninne"	Mani Sharma	Sirivennela Seetharama Sastry	
Arundhati	"Bhu Bhu Bhujangam"	Koti	Veturi	
Mestri	"Anaganagaa"	Vandemataram Srinivas	Veturi	K. J. Yesudas
Malli Malli	"Maggada"	S. Thaman	Ananta Sriram	
Punnami Naagu	"Poojinche Punnami Naagu"	S. A. Rajkumar	Siva Shakthi Datta	
Mitrudu	"Dont Touch Me"	Mani Sharma	Ananta Sriram	Ranjith
Kick	"Dhim Thana"	S. Thaman	Sirivennela Seetharama Sastry	S. Thaman, Ranjith
Kalavaramaye Madilo	"Kalavaramaye Madilo"	Sharreth	Vanamali	
Kalavaramaye Madilo	"Tholi Tholi Aasalenno"	Sharreth	Vanamali	
Kalavaramaye Madilo	"Neelo Anuvantha"	Sharreth	Vanamali	Roshan Sebastian
Kalavaramaye Madilo	"Kari Varadhuni"	Sharreth	Vanamali	Sharreth
Kalavaramaye Madilo	"Gurubrahma"	Sharreth	Vanamali	
Kalavaramaye Madilo	"Pallavinchani"	Sharreth	Vanamali	
Kurradu	"Sarle Vadiley"	Achu Rajamani	Ananta Sriram	

=== 2010s ===
==== 2010 ====
Film	Song	Composer(s)	Writer(s)	Co-artist(s)
Panchakshari	"Panchakshirike Kalyanam"	Chinna	Sirivennela Seetharama Sastry	
Subhapradam	"Tappatloi Taalaloi"	Mani Sharma	Ramajogayya Sastry	
Puli	"Nammakame Iyyara"	A. R. Rahman	Chandrabose	Madhushree, Harini
Collector Gari Bharya	"Sai Baba Karuninchu"	Chinna	Sirivennela Seetharama Sastry	
Collector Gari Bharya	"Manasulona"	Chinna	Sirivennela Seetharama Sastry	
Collector Gari Bharya	"Cheyi Cheyi"	Chinna	Sirivennela Seetharama Sastry	
Nagavalli	"Omkara"	Gurukiran	Chandrabose	
Ragada	"Ragada Ragada"	S. Thaman	Ramajogayya Sastry	Baba Sehgal, Rita Thyagarajan

==== 2011 ====
Film	Song	Composer(s)	Writer(s)	Co-artist(s)
Mirapakay	"Silakaa"	S. Thaman	Bhaskarabhatla Ravi Kumar	Rahul Nambiar
Aha Naa Pellanta!	"Nuvve Nachhavu"	Raghu Kunche	Sira Sri	
Kudirithe Kappu Coffee	"Andarlaaga"	Rahul Raj	Sirivennela Seetharama Sastry	
Prema Kavali	"Nuvve Nuvve Naa"	Anup Rubens	Ramajogayya Sastry	Vijay Prakash
180	"Ninna Leni"	Sharreth	Vanamali	Anand Aravindakshan, S. Sowmya
It's My Love Story	"Ninnala Lede"	Sunil Kashyap	Ramajogayya Sastry	Dinakar
It's My Love Story	"Thadi Pedavule"	Sunil Kashyap	Ramajogayya Sastry	N. C. Karunya
Sri Rama Rajyam	"Devulle Mechchindi"	Ilaiyaraaja	Jonnavittula Ramalingeswara Rao	Shreya Ghoshal
Sri Rama Rajyam	"Ramayanamu Sri Ramayanamu"	Ilaiyaraaja	Jonnavittula Ramalingeswara Rao	Shreya Ghoshal
Kshetram	"Dheera Dheera"	Koti	Suddala Ashok Teja	Mano
Kshetram	"Hey Kala"	Koti	Suddala Ashok Teja	Karthik

==== 2012 ====
Film	Song	Composer(s)	Writer(s)	Co-artist(s)
Nippu	"Nena Ninnu"	S. Thaman	Vanamali	Karthik
Endukante Premanta	"Nee Choopule"	G. V. Prakash Kumar	Ramajogayya Sastry	Haricharan
Tuneega Tuneega	"Tuneega Tuneega"	Karthik Raja	Krishna Chaitanya	MK Balaji
Damarukam	"Reppalapai"	Devi Sri Prasad	Ramajogayya Sastry	Hariharan

==== 2013 ====
Film	Song	Composer(s)	Writer(s)	Co-artist(s)
Seethamma Vakitlo Sirimalle Chettu	"Seethamma Vakitlo"	Mickey J Meyer	Ananta Sriram	
Pavitra	"Pavitra"	M. M. Srilekha	Ramajogayya Sastry	
Pavitra	"Sukumara Raara"	M. M. Srilekha	Ramajogayya Sastry	

==== 2014 ====
Film	Song	Composer(s)	Writer(s)	Co-artist(s)
Legend	"Nee Kanti Choopullo"	Devi Sri Prasad	Ramajogayya Sastry	Vijay Yesudas
Avatharam	"Vevela Jejalive"	Ghantadi Krishna	Jonnavitthula	
Avatharam	"Nalugu Dhikkula"	Ghantadi Krishna	Jonnavitthula	
Mukunda	"Gopikamma"	Mickey J Meyer	Sirivennela Seetharama Sastry	

==== 2015 ====
Film	Song	Composer(s)	Writer(s)	Co-artist(s)
Malli Malli Idi Rani Roju	"Marhaba"	Gopi Sundar	Sahiti	Aishwarya
Rudhramadevi	"Matthagajame"	Ilaiyaraaja	Sirivennela Seetharama Sastry	S. P. Balasubrahmanyam, Kailash Kher
Rudhramadevi	"Choosukovo Teesukovo"	Ilaiyaraaja	Sirivennela Seetharama Sastry	Baba Sehgal
Rudhramadevi	"Anthapuramlo Andala Chilaka"	Ilaiyaraaja	Sirivennela Seetharama Sastry	Sadhana Sargam, Chinmayi

==== 2016 ====
Film	Song	Composer(s)	Writer(s)	Co-artist(s)
Nenu Sailaja	"Ee Premaki"	Devi Sri Prasad	Sirivennela Seetharama Sastry	
Savitri	"Chitramainadi"	Shravan	Krishna Chaitanya	Sai Charan
Supreme	"Andam Hindolam (remix)"	Sai Karthik, Raj-Koti	Veturi	L. V. Revanth
A Aa	"Yaa Yaa"	Mickey J Meyer	Ramajogayya Sastry	Abhay Jodhpurkar, Anjana Sowmya, Sai Shivani

==== 2017 ====
Film	Song	Composer(s)	Writer(s)	Co-artist(s)
Sathamanam Bhavati	"Shatamanam Bhavati"	Mickey J Meyer	Ramajogayya Sastry	Vijay Yesudas
Dwaraka	"Bhajare Nandagopala"	Sai Karthik	Sri Sai Kiran	
DJ: Duvvada Jagannadham	"Gudilo Badilo Madilo Vodilo"	Devi Sri Prasad	Sahiti	MLR Karthikeyan

==== 2019 ====
Film	Song	Composer(s)	Writer(s)	Co-artist(s)
NTR: Kathanayakudu N.T.R: Mahanayakudu	"Bantureethi Koluvu"	M. M. Keeravani	Sirivennela Seetharama Sastry	Sreenidhi Tirumala
NTR: Kathanayakudu N.T.R: Mahanayakudu	"Ramanna Katha"	M. M. Keeravani	M. M. Keeravani	Sunitha Upadrashta
Oorantha Anukuntunnaru	"Kanna"	K. M. Radha Krishnan	Vanamali	K. M. Radha Krishnan

=== 2020s ===
Year	Film	Song	Composer(s)	Writer(s)	Co-artist(s)
2020	Kalakarudu	"Kanulalo Neeru"	Raghuram	Ala Raju	
2021	Kalaposhakulu	"Nuvvele Nuvvele"	Yelender Mahaveer	Rambabu Goshala	Vijay Prakash
2021	Marakkar: Lion of the Arabian Sea	"Chinni Kunjali"	Ronnie Raphael	Vennelakanti	
2022	Bangarraju	"Nuvvu Siggupadithe"	Anup Rubens	Kasarla Shyam	Sai Charan
2022	Bheemla Nayak	"Antha Ishtam"	Thaman S	Ramajogayya Sastry	
2022	Hello June	"Chinni Chinni"	Ifthi	Sri Siraag	
2022	Major	"Kanna Kanna"	Sricharan Pakala	Ramajogayya Sastry	
2022	Sita Ramam	"Nene Aa Nene"	Vishal Chandrashekhar	Sirivennela Sitaramasastri	Hariharan
2022	Banaras	"Tholi Tholi Valape"	B. Ajaneesh Loknath	Krishna Kanth	Karthik
2022	Butterfly	"Amma"	Arviz	Anantha Sriram	
2023	Vaarasudu	"Amma"	Thaman S	Ramajogayya Sastry	
2023	Geetha Sakshiga	"Amma Manasu"	Gopi Sundar	Rehman	
2023	Yendhira Ee Panchayithi	"Katha Kadhu"	Peddapalli Rohith		
2023	Calling Sahasra	"Kalaya Nijama"	Mohith Rahmanic	Lakshmi Priyanka	
2023	Perfume	"Ilanti Prema"	Ajay Arasada	Chandrabose	
2023	Pindam	"Guvva Gelichindi"	Krishna Saurabh	Kavi Siddhartha	
2024	The Greatest of All Time (D)	"Ninnu Kanna Kanulae"	Yuvan Shankar Raja	Ramajogayya Sastry	S. P. Charan
2024	Darshini	"Ninnele Ninnele"	Nizani Anjan	Giridhar Ragolu	Yazin Nizar
2024	Sarangadhariya	"Andukova"	M. Ebenezer Paul	Rambabu Gosala	
2024	Sabari	"Anaganagaa Oka Kadhala"	Gopi Sundar	Rahman	
2025	8 Vasantalu	"Parichayamila"	Hesham Abdul Wahab	Vanamali	
2026	EPIC - First Semester	"Manasa Vaacha"	Hesham Abdul Wahab	Sri Harsha Emani	S. P. Charan
2026	Kiku Chiranjeevi	"Ekkadunnavo Emchesthunnavo"	Shekar Chandra	Bhaskarabhatla	

== Malayalam songs ==
This is an incomplete list

Year	Film	Song	Composer(s)	Writer(s)	Co-artist(s)
1979	Kummatty	"Muthassikkadhayile"	M. G. Radhakrishnan; Kavalam Narayana Panicker	Kavalam Narayana Panicker	Manju, Asha, Usha
1982	Aasha	"Aashe Aare Chaare"	A. T. Ummer	Dr. Pavithran	K. J. Yesudas, K. S. Beena, Chorus
1982	Kelkkaatha Sabdham	"Maanikyam"	Johnson	Devadas	K. J. Yesudas
1982	Njan Ekananu	"Rajani Parayu"	M. G. Radhakrishnan	Sathyan Anthikad	solo
1982	Njan Ekananu	"Pranaya Vasantham"	M. G. Radhakrishnan	Sathyan Anthikad	K. J. Yesudas
1982	Novemberinte Nashtam	"Arikilo Akaleyo"	M. G. Radhakrishnan	Poovachal Khader	Arundhathi
1982	Novemberinte Nashtam	"Arikilo Akaleyo" (record version)	M. G. Radhakrishnan	Poovachal Khader	M. G. Sreekumar, Arundhati
1982	Snehapoorvam Meera	"Enthu Mama Sadanathil"	M. G. Radhakrishnan		K. S. Beena
1983	Ente Mamattukkuttiyammakku	"Aalorungi Arangorungi"	Jerry Amaldev	Bichu Thirumala	solo
1983	Ente Mamattukkuttiyammakku	"Thaimanikkunju Thennal"	Jerry Amaldev	Bichu Thirumala	chorus
1983	Mounaraagam	"Gaaname Unaroo Dukha"	K. J. Yesudas	Sreekumaran Thampi	solo
1983	Rathilayam	"Kadalilum Karayilum"	M. G. Radhakrishnan	Poovachal Khader	K. G. Markose
1984	Arante Mulla Kochu Mulla	"Kaattil Kodum Kaattil"	Alleppey Ranganath	Madhu Alappuzha	K. J. Yesudas
1984	Arante Mulla Kochu Mulla	"Ponthaamarakal Poothulayum"	Alleppey Ranganath	Madhu Alappuzha	K. J. Yesudas
1985	Parayanumvayya Parayathirikkanumvayya	"Kannil Virinju Moham"	M. G. Radhakrishnan	Chunakkara Ramankutty	M. G. Sreekumar
1986	Ayalvasi Oru Daridravasi	"Swarangalaay"	M. G. Radhakrishnan	Chunakkara Ramankutty	M. G. Sreekumar
1986	Geetham	"Hei Kurumpi"	Ravindran	Bichu Thirumala	
1987	Sarvakalashala	"Panineerppoovithalil"	M. G. Radhakrishnan	Kavalam Narayana Panicker	K. J. Yesudas
1987	Jaalakam	"Unni Urangaariraro"	M. G. Radhakrishnan	O. N. V. Kurup	

=== 1990s ===
Year	Film	Song	Composer(s)	Writer(s)	Co-artist(s)
1992	Adhwaytham	"Mazhavilkkothumbil"	M. G. Radhakrishnan	Kaithapram Damodaran Namboothiri	M. G. Sreekumar
1992	Adhwaytham	"Ambalappuzhe"	M. G. Radhakrishnan	Kaithapram Damodaran Namboothiri	M. G. Sreekumar
1992	Adhwaytham	"Krishna Krishna"	M. G. Radhakrishnan	Kaithapram Damodaran Namboothiri	
1992	Oohakachavadam	"Engo Thaazhvarakkattile"	M. G. Radhakrishnan	Kala Adoor	
1993	Manichitrathazhu	"Varuvaanillarumee"	M. G. Radhakrishnan	Madhu Muttam	
1993	Manichitrathazhu	"Akkuthikkuthanakkombil"	M. G. Radhakrishnan	Bichu Thirumala	G. Venugopal, Sujatha Mohan, M. G. Radhakrishnan
1993	Manichitrathazhu	"Oru Murai Vanthu"	M. G. Radhakrishnan	Vaali (Tamil), Bichu Thirumala	K. J. Yesudas
1993	Devaasuram	"Angopangam"	M. G. Radhakrishnan	Gireesh Puthenchery	
1993	Devaasuram	"Sree Paadam"	M. G. Radhakrishnan	Gireesh Puthenchery	
1994	Kashmeeram	"Poru Nee Vaarilam"	M. G. Radhakrishnan	Gireesh Puthenchery	
1995	Agnidevan	"Saama Gaana"	M. G. Radhakrishnan	Gireesh Puthenchery	M. G. Sreekumar
1996	Azhakiya Ravanan	"O Dilruba "	Vidyasagar	Kaithapram Damodaran Namboothiri	Hariharan
1996	Azhakiya Ravanan	"Vennila Chandana"	Vidyasagar	Kaithapram Damodaran Namboothiri	
1996	Indraprastham	"Thanka Thinkal"	Vidyasagar		M. G. Sreekumar
1998	Rakthasakshikal Sindabad	"Nammalu Koyyum"	M. G. Radhakrishnan	O. N. V. Kurup	M. G. Sreekumar, Chorus
1998	Rakthasakshikal Sindabad	"Ponnaaryan Paadam"	M. G. Radhakrishnan	Gireesh Puthenchery	
1998	Rakthasakshikal Sindabad	"Vaikaasithennalo"	M. G. Radhakrishnan	Gireesh Puthenchery	M. G. Sreekumar
1999	Kannezhuthi Pottum Thottu	"Kaithappoovin"	M. G. Radhakrishnan	Kavalam Narayana Panicker	Mohanlal
1999	Kannezhuthi Pottum Thottu	"Meenakkodikkaate"	M. G. Radhakrishnan	Kavalam Narayana Panicker	

=== 2000s ===
Year	Film	Song	Composer(s)	Writer(s)	Co-artist(s)
2000	Pilots	"Poo Poothu Minni Thennum Yaamam"	M. G. Radhakrishnan	Gireesh Puthenchery	K. J. Yesudas
2000	Narasimham	"Manjin Mutheduthu"	M. G. Radhakrishnan	Gireesh Puthenchery	M. G. Sreekumar
2001	Achaneyanenikkishtam	"Shalabham Vazhimaarumaa"	M. G. Radhakrishnan	S. Ramesan Nair	M. G. Sreekumar
2003	Kattu Vannu Vilichappol	"Kaatte Nee"	M. G. Radhakrishnan	Thirunalloor Karunakaran	
2005	Anandabhadram	"Shivamallikaavil"	M. G. Radhakrishnan	Gireesh Puthenchery	
2005	Anandabhadram	"Minnayam Minnum"	M. G. Radhakrishnan	Gireesh Puthenchery	

=== 2020s ===
Year	Film	Song	Composer(s)	Writer(s)	Co-artist(s)
2020	Varane Avashyamund	"Ne Va En Arumukha"	Alphons Joseph	Santhosh Varma	Karthik
2020	Varane Avashyamund	"Kuttikkurumba"	Alphons Joseph	Santhosh Varma	
2021	Mohan Kumar Fans	"Oru Theera Novu (solo)"	Prince George	Jis Joy	
2021	Mohan Kumar Fans	"Oru Theera Novu (duet)"	Prince George	Jis Joy	Abhijith Kollam
2021	Malik	"Theerame Theerame"	Sushin Shyam	Anwar Ali	Sooraj Santhosh
2021	Kaalchilambu	"Payyanur Pavitram"	Kaithapram Damodaran Namboothiri	Kaithapram Damodaran Namboothiri	
2021	Kaaval	"Kaarmekham Moodunnu"	Ranjin Raj	B. K. Harinarayanan	
2021	Marakkar: Lion of the Arabian Sea	"Kunju Kunjaali"	Rahul Raj	B. K. Harinarayanan	
2022	Malayankunju	"Ponni Makale"	A. R. Rahman	Vinayak Sasikumar	
2023	Pookkaalam	"Ore Pakal"	Sachin Warrier	Rafeeq Ahamed	Shahabaz Aman
2023	Pookkaalam	"Vaadunnuvo"	Sachin Warrier	Rafeeq Ahamed	Sachin Warrier
2023	Neelavelicham	"Anuraga Madhuchashakam"	Bijibal, Rex Vijayan	P. Bhaskaran	
2023	Neelavelicham	"Potthithakarnna Kinavu"	Bijibal, Rex Vijayan	P. Bhaskaran	
2023	Neelavelicham	"Vasantha Panchami"	Bijibal, Rex Vijayan	P. Bhaskaran	
2023	Madhura Manohara Moham	"Thathana Thathana"	Hesham Abdul Wahab	B. K. Harinarayanan	Chorus
2024	Iyer in Arabia	"Parayaathe Parayunnathellam"	Anand Madhusoodhanan	Prabha Varma	Shahabaz Aman
2024	Aanandhapuram Diaries	"Aaru Nee Kanmani"	Albert Vijayan	Rafeeq Ahamed	
2024	Varshangalkku Shesham	"Jeevithagaadhakale"	Amrit Ramnath	Vaisakh Sugunan	Sreevalsan J. Menon, Mithun Jayaraj
2025	Anpodu Kanmani	"Mazhananavariyum"	Samuel Aby	Manu Manjith	
2025	Ponman	"Paka"	Justin Varghese	Suhail Koya	Justin Varghese
2025	Randaam Yaamam	"Melle Vannu Priyan"	Mohan Sithara	Nemom Pushparaj	
2025	PDC Athra Cheriya Degree Alla	"Manju Moodiya Thazhvarayil"	Firos Nadh	Illiyas Kadameri	Firos Nadh
2025	Vala: Story of a Bangle	"Arike"	Govind Vasantha	Rafeeq Ahamed	
2026	Magic Mushrooms	"Aaraane Aaraane"	Nadirshah	Rajeev Govindan	Rimi Tomy

== Kannada songs ==
=== 1980s ===
==== 1986 ====
Film	No	Song	Composer(s)	Writer(s)	Co-artist(s)
Sathkara	1	"Cheluveya Moga"	Satyam	Chi. Udayashankar	K. J. Yesudas
Preethi	2	"Nee Hachida Ee Kunkuma"	G. K. Venkatesh	Shyamasundar Kulkarni	S. P. Balasubrahmanyam
Aruna Raaga	3	"Hoovantha Hrudayavanu"	M. Ranga Rao	Doddarange Gowda	Solo
Aruna Raaga	4	"Naanondu Theera"	M. Ranga Rao	Doddarange Gowda	K. J. Yesudas
Africadalli Sheela	5	"Sheela O My Sheela"	Bappi Lahiri	Chi. Udayashankar	K. J. Yesudas
Sathya Jyothi	6	"Krishnana Kaanuva"	Ilaiyaraaja	R. N. Jayagopal	Solo
Sathya Jyothi	7	"Ananda Indu Ananda"	Ilaiyaraaja	Chi. Udayashankar	Solo

==== 1987 ====
Film	No	Song	Composer(s)	Writer(s)	Co-artist(s)
Aapadbandhava	8	"Manadaseye Nijavadare"	Rajan Nagendra	Chi. Udayashankar	S. P. Balasubrahmanyam
Dance Raja Dance (Also sang for Telugu and Tamil dubbed versions)	9	"Ee Namma Baale"	Vijayanand	Chi. Udayashankar	S. P. Balasubrahmanyam
Jeevana Jyothi	10	"Aatavu Chanda"	Vijayanand	Chi. Udayashankar	S. P. Balasubrahmanyam
Karunamayi	11	"Hejje Mele Hejje"	Rajan Nagendra	Chi. Udayashankar	S. P. Balasubrahmanyam
Karunamayi	12	"Manasali Bayasuvude"	Rajan Nagendra	Chi. Udayashankar	S. P. Balasubrahmanyam
Karunamayi	13	"Nammoora Cheluva"	Rajan Nagendra	Chi. Udayashankar	S. P. Balasubrahmanyam
Nyayakke Shikshe	14	"Nee Nakkare"	Vijayanand	R. N. Jayagopal	S. P. Balasubrahmanyam
Nyayakke Shikshe	15	"Namagagi Daiva Thanda"	Vijayanand	R. N. Jayagopal	Solo
Onde Goodina Hakkigalu	16	"Anna Atthige"	Vijayanand	R. N. Jayagopal	S. P. Balasubrahmanyam
Onde Goodina Hakkigalu	17	"Manasu Manasu"	Vijayanand	R. N. Jayagopal	Solo
Ravana Rajya	18	"Thande Nee Needubaa"	Vijayanand	R. N. Jayagopal	Manjula Gururaj
Ravana Rajya	19	"Thande Nee Needubaa -Sad"	Vijayanand	R. N. Jayagopal	Solo
Sathyam Shivam Sundaram	20	"Ide Reethi Endu"	Chakravarthy	Chi. Udayashankar	S. P. Balasubrahmanyam
Sathyam Shivam Sundaram	21	"Eneno Kanasa Kande"	Chakravarthy	Chi. Udayashankar	Solo
Vijayothsava	22	"Aagaasake"	Shankar Ganesh	Chi. Udayashankar	Rajkumar Bharathi

==== 1988 ====
Film	No	Song	Composer(s)	Writer(s)	Co-artist(s)
Arjun	23	"Baa Raaja Baa"	Rajan Nagendra	R. N. Jayagopal	S. P. Balasubrahmanyam
Arjun	24	"Naa Jaadugara"	Rajan Nagendra	R. N. Jayagopal	S. P. Balasubrahmanyam
Brahma Vishnu Maheshwara	25	"Chinna Naale Neenu"	Vijayanand	Chi. Udayashankar	Mano
Dharmathma	26	"Chinna Chinna Onde Aase"	Rajan Nagendra	Chi. Udayashankar	S. P. Balasubrahmanyam
Dharmathma	27	"Gaali Mysokithu"	Rajan Nagendra	Chi. Udayashankar	Solo
Jana Nayaka	28	"Doo Doo Basavanna"	Rajan Nagendra	R. N. Jayagopal	S. P. Balasubrahmanyam
Jana Nayaka	29	"Madhuchandra Banda"	Rajan Nagendra	R. N. Jayagopal	S. P. Balasubrahmanyam
Jana Nayaka	30	"Sukumari Sundarangiye"	Rajan Nagendra	Doddarange Gowda	S. P. Balasubrahmanyam
Jana Nayaka	31	"Jananayaka Namma Oorige"	Rajan Nagendra	Shyamasundar Kulkarni	S. P. Balasubrahmanyam
Nammoora Raja	32	"Aakasha Angaiyali"	Rajan Nagendra	Chi. Udayashankar	S. P. Balasubrahmanyam
Nammoora Raja	33	"Kilaadi Jodi"	Rajan Nagendra	Chi. Udayashankar	S. P. Balasubrahmanyam
Nammoora Raja	34	"Anuraagaveno Anandaveno"	Rajan Nagendra	Shyamasundar Kulkarni	Vishnuvardhan
Shakthi	35	"Manada Gudi"	Chakravarthy	R. N. Jayagopal	S. P. Balasubrahmanyam
Shakthi	36	"Baalondu Hoobana"	Chakravarthy	Shyamasundar Kulkarni	S. P. Balasubrahmanyam
Shakthi	37	"Nannantha Hennanu"	Chakravarthy	Shyamasundar Kulkarni	Solo
Suprabhatha	38	"Cheluve Nanna Cheluve"	Rajan Nagendra	Chi. Udayashankar	S. P. Balasubrahmanyam
Suprabhatha	39	"Aralida Aase"	Rajan Nagendra	Chi. Udayashankar	S. P. Balasubrahmanyam
Suprabhatha	40	"Ee Hrudaya Haadide"	Rajan Nagendra	Chi. Udayashankar	Solo

==== 1989 ====
Film	No	Song	Composer(s)	Writer(s)	Co-artist(s)
Adrushta Rekhe	41	"Hey Modi Maado"	Shankar Ganesh	Sriranga	S. P. Balasubrahmanyam
C.B.I. Shankar	42	"Idhu Mayabazaaru"	Hamsalekha	Hamsalekha	S. P. Balasubrahmanyam
C.B.I. Shankar	43	"Kaada Noda Hode"	Hamsalekha	Hamsalekha	S. P. Balasubrahmanyam
C.B.I. Shankar	44	"Geethanjali"	Hamsalekha	Hamsalekha	S. P. Balasubrahmanyam
Doctor Krishna	45	"Helida Maathu"	Rajan Nagendra	Chi. Udayashankar	S. P. Balasubrahmanyam
Doctor Krishna	46	"Bali Barele Chanchale"	Rajan Nagendra	V. Manohar	S. P. Balasubrahmanyam
Doctor Krishna	47	"Karunamayi Neene Daiva"	Rajan Nagendra	Su. Rudramurthy Shastry	S. P. Balasubrahmanyam
Gagana	48	"Ellu Kaanenu"	Rajan Nagendra	Chi. Udayashankar	S. P. Balasubrahmanyam
Gagana	49	"Naanu Happy"	Rajan Nagendra	Chi. Udayashankar	S. P. Balasubrahmanyam
Gagana	50	"Enaaythu Nanna Nalla"	Rajan Nagendra	Chi. Udayashankar	Solo
Gagana	51	"Baagilu Theredu"	Rajan Nagendra	Chi. Udayashankar	Solo
Gagana	52	"Iniya Baareya"	Rajan Nagendra	Chi. Udayashankar	Solo
Guru	53	"Nannantha Hudugi"	Bappi Lahiri	Chi. Udayashankar	S. P. Balasubrahmanyam
Guru	54	"Nee Muttidare Saaku"	Bappi Lahiri	Chi. Udayashankar	S. P. Balasubrahmanyam
Guru	55	"Ardha Raatri Veleli"	Bappi Lahiri	Chi. Udayashankar	S. P. Balasubrahmanyam
Hendthighelbedi	56	"Madhura Maya"	Vijayanand	Su. Rudramurthy Shastry	S. P. Balasubrahmanyam
Hendthighelbedi	57	"Neene Muride"	Vijayanand	Su. Rudramurthy Shastry	Solo
Hongkongnalli Agent Amar	58	"Ee Henna Roopa"	Peter J. Kamilose	R. N. Jayagopal	S. P. Balasubrahmanyam
Hongkongnalli Agent Amar	59	"Chinna Nelasiruve"	Peter J. Kamilose	R. N. Jayagopal	S. P. Balasubrahmanyam
Hongkongnalli Agent Amar	60	"Hello My Preyasi"	Peter J. Kamilose	R. N. Jayagopal	S. P. Balasubrahmanyam
Hrudaya Geethe	61	"Hrudaya Geethe Haaduthire"	Rajan Nagendra	Doddarange Gowda	S. P. Balasubrahmanyam
Hrudaya Geethe	62	"Yuga Yugagale Saagali"	Rajan Nagendra	M. N. Vyasa Rao	Solo
Idu Saadhya	63	"Kanninalle Nee Kollabeda"	Vijayanand	R. N. Jayagopal	Alisha Chinoy
Krishna Nee Kunidaga	64	"Praya Bandare Yaako"	Vijayanand	Hamsalekha	S. P. Balasubrahmanyam
Krishna Nee Kunidaga	65	"Dhama Dhamaru"	Vijayanand	R. N. Jayagopal	S. P. Balasubrahmanyam
Krishna Nee Kunidaga	66	"Ee Raadhe Jeeva"	Vijayanand	R. N. Jayagopal	Solo
Nyaayakkagi Naanu	67	"Kalla Nalla"	Satyam	R. N. Jayagopal	S. P. Balasubrahmanyam
Ondagi Balu	68	"Minuguva Thaare"	Vijayanand	Chi. Udayashankar	S. P. Balasubrahmanyam
Ondagi Balu	69	"Balegalu Aaduthide"	Vijayanand	Chi. Udayashankar	Solo
Sharavegada Saradara	70	"Attha Ittha Suttha Muttha"	Sangeetha Raja	Doddarange Gowda	S. P. Balasubrahmanyam

=== 1990s ===
==== 1990 ====
Film	No	Song	Composer(s)	Writer(s)	Co-artist(s)
Agni Divya	71	"Nee Ello Alle Ee Kannu"	Shyam	Chi. Udayashankar	Solo
Ajay Vijay	72	"Gaganade Thelide"	Yuvarajan	R. N. Jayagopal	S. P. Balasubrahmanyam
Ekalavya	73	"Ninna Sneha Channa"	Sangeetha Raja	Chi. Udayashankar	S. P. Balasubrahmanyam
Ekalavya	74	"Mutthu Mutthu Eega"	Sangeetha Raja	Chi. Udayashankar	S. P. Balasubrahmanyam
Ekalavya	75	"Male Billu Anda Illa"	Sangeetha Raja	Chi. Udayashankar	S. P. Balasubrahmanyam
Ekalavya	76	"Samsaravaadarenu"	Sangeetha Raja	Chi. Udayashankar	S. P. Balasubrahmanyam
Ekalavya	77	"Baa Illi Baa"	Sangeetha Raja	Chi. Udayashankar	S. P. Balasubrahmanyam
Kempu Surya	78	"Intha Gande Beku"	Rajan Nagendra	Chi. Udayashankar	S. P. Balasubrahmanyam
Kempu Surya	79	"Hejje Mele Hejje"	Rajan Nagendra	Chi. Udayashankar	S. P. Balasubrahmanyam
Kempu Surya	80	"Kempu Suryana"	Rajan Nagendra	Chi. Udayashankar	S. P. Balasubrahmanyam
Maheshwara	81	"Swaravu Shruthiyu"	Vijayanand	R. N. Jayagopal	S. P. Balasubrahmanyam
Maheshwara	82	"Manmatha Barediha"	Vijayanand	R. N. Jayagopal	S. P. Balasubrahmanyam
Mathsara	83	"Vesha Haaki"	Sangeetha Raja	Doddarange Gowda	S. P. Balasubrahmanyam
Mathsara	84	"Munnuggi Nadedare"	Sangeetha Raja	Doddarange Gowda	S. P. Balasubrahmanyam
Mathsara	85	"Kolalu Neenire"	Sangeetha Raja	Doddarange Gowda	S. P. Balasubrahmanyam
Mathe Haditu Kogile	86	"Naanindu Ninninda"	Rajan Nagendra	Chi. Udayashankar	S. P. Balasubrahmanyam
Mathe Haditu Kogile	87	"Haaduva Aase Haadadu Yeko"	Rajan Nagendra	Chi. Udayashankar	S. P. Balasubrahmanyam
Mathe Haditu Kogile	88	"Nava Vasanthada Gaali"	Rajan Nagendra	Chi. Udayashankar	S. P. Balasubrahmanyam
Muthina Haara	89	"Madikeri Sipayi"	Hamsalekha	Hamsalekha	S. P. Balasubrahmanyam
Muthina Haara	90	"Huliya Haalina Mevu"	Hamsalekha	Hamsalekha	S. P. Balasubrahmanyam
Muthina Haara	91	"Devaru Hoseda Premada Daara"	Hamsalekha	Hamsalekha	M. Balamuralikrishna
Panchama Veda	92	"Aase Holeye Ukki"	Sangeetha Raja	R. N. Jayagopal	Solo
Panchama Veda	93	"Nee Thanda Preethi"	Sangeetha Raja	R. N. Jayagopal	Solo
Poli Kitty	94	"Ee Rathri"	Sangeetha Raja	Doddarange Gowda	S. P. Balasubrahmanyam
Poli Kitty	95	"Thangali Beesidaga"	Sangeetha Raja	Doddarange Gowda	S. P. Balasubrahmanyam
Poli Kitty	96	"Oh Krishnaiah"	Sangeetha Raja	Doddarange Gowda	S. P. Balasubrahmanyam
Sididedda Gandu	97	"Helalilla Kelalilla"	Hamsalekha	Hamsalekha	Solo

==== 1991 ====
Film	No	Song	Composer(s)	Writer(s)	Co-artist(s)
Anatha Rakshaka	98	"Cheluvi Ninna"	Hamsalekha	Hamsalekha	S. P. Balasubrahmanyam
Aranyadalli Abhimanyu	99	"Preethige Maathugalu"	Laxmikant-Pyarelal	Su. Rudramurthy Shastry	S. P. Balasubrahmanyam
Aranyadalli Abhimanyu	100	"Manada Uyyale"	Laxmikant-Pyarelal	Su. Rudramurthy Shastry	S. P. Balasubrahmanyam
Aranyadalli Abhimanyu	101	"He Ganda Nanna Ganda"	Laxmikant-Pyarelal	Doddarange Gowda	S. P. Balasubrahmanyam
Aranyadalli Abhimanyu	102	"Ee Namma Pandyadalli"	Laxmikant-Pyarelal	Shyamasundar Kulkarni	Solo
Bangaradantha Maga	103	"Nenneginta Indu Channa"	S. Vasu Rao	Chi. Udayashankar	Mano
Bangaradantha Maga	104	"Kamana Billigintha"	S. Vasu Rao	Chi. Udayashankar	Mano
Gandanige Thakka Hendthi	105	"Aadu Thamashe Nodu"	Rajan Nagendra	Su. Rudramurthy Shastry	S. P. Balasubrahmanyam
Gandanige Thakka Hendthi	106	"Haaku Hejje"	Rajan Nagendra	Doddarange Gowda	S. P. Balasubrahmanyam
Gandanige Thakka Hendthi	107	"Sangeetha Ee Jeevana"	Rajan Nagendra	Shyamasundar Kulkarni	S. P. Balasubrahmanyam
Gandanige Thakka Hendthi	108	"Kuniyona Baa"	Rajan Nagendra	Geethapriya	S. P. Balasubrahmanyam, Manjula Gururaj
Gowri Kalyana	109	"Preethiyalli Entha"	S. A. Rajkumar	R. N. Jayagopal	S. P. Balasubrahmanyam
Gowri Kalyana	110	"Premada Kalpane"	S. A. Rajkumar	M. N. Vyasa Rao	S. P. Balasubrahmanyam
Ibbaru Hendira Muddina Police	111	"Geethopadesha Maadide"	Raj-Koti	R. N. Jayagopal	S. P. Balasubrahmanyam
Ibbaru Hendira Muddina Police	112	"Gange Gowri"	Raj-Koti	R. N. Jayagopal	S. P. Balasubrahmanyam
Ibbaru Hendira Muddina Police	113	"Mellage Nee Bandu"	Raj-Koti	R. N. Jayagopal	S. P. Balasubrahmanyam
Jagadeka Veera	114	"Naanu Neenu Koodi"	Rajan Nagendra	Su. Rudramurthy Shastry	S. P. Balasubrahmanyam
Jagadeka Veera	115	"Ninna Roopa"	Rajan Nagendra	Chi. Udayashankar	S. P. Balasubrahmanyam
Jagadeka Veera	116	"Nanna Premi"	Rajan Nagendra	Shyamasundar Kulkarni	Solo
Kadana	117	"Ee Sudo Bisi"	Sangeetha Raja	R. N. Jayagopal	Mano
Kadana	118	"Premadooralli Maavu Thorana"	Sangeetha Raja	R. N. Jayagopal	Mano
Kadana	119	"Ye Kalli Nodilli"	Sangeetha Raja	R. N. Jayagopal	Mano
Kiladi Gandu	120	"Hatthira Hatthira"	Manoranjan Prabhakar	Chi. Udayashankar	S. P. Balasubrahmanyam
Kiladi Gandu	121	"Neene Doni"	Manoranjan Prabhakar	M. N. Vyasa Rao	S. P. Balasubrahmanyam
Mangalya	122	"Nannase Enendu"	Rajan Nagendra	Chi. Udayashankar	Solo
Mangalya	123	"Sarvamangalege Shivanu"	Rajan Nagendra	Chi. Udayashankar	Manjula Gururaj
Mangalya	124	"Mutthinantha Maathanu"	Rajan Nagendra	Chi. Udayashankar	S. P. Balasubrahmanyam
Mathru Bhagya	125	"Nee Nagalu"	Upendra Kumar	Chi. Udayashankar	S. P. Balasubrahmanyam
Mathru Bhagya	126	"Thaalalaare Naa"	Upendra Kumar	Chi. Udayashankar	S. P. Balasubrahmanyam
Navathare	127	"Romeo Romeo"	Hamsalekha	Hamsalekha	S. P. Balasubrahmanyam
Navathare	128	"Loka Loka Nododu"	Hamsalekha	Hamsalekha	S. P. Balasubrahmanyam
Navathare	129	"O Majanu Ninage Sharanu"	Hamsalekha	Hamsalekha	S. P. Balasubrahmanyam
Navathare	130	"Neerinanthe Nirmala"	Hamsalekha	Hamsalekha	S. P. Balasubrahmanyam
Navathare	131	"O Majanu Ninage"	Hamsalekha	Hamsalekha	Solo
Nayaka	132	"Thakajum Thakajum"	Hamsalekha	Hamsalekha	S. P. Balasubrahmanyam
Nayaka	133	"Bhramara O Bhramara"	Hamsalekha	Hamsalekha	Solo
Neenu Nakkare Haalu Sakkare	134	"Baare Santhege Hogona"	Hamsalekha	Hamsalekha	S. P. Balasubrahmanyam
Neenu Nakkare Haalu Sakkare	135	"Baare Rukkamma"	Hamsalekha	Hamsalekha	S. P. Balasubrahmanyam
Neenu Nakkare Haalu Sakkare	136	"Nooru Henna Kandu"	Hamsalekha	Hamsalekha	S. P. Balasubrahmanyam
Neenu Nakkare Haalu Sakkare	137	"Baanalli Ninninda Sooryodaya"	Hamsalekha	Hamsalekha	Solo
Police Matthu Dada	138	"Ninna Kannali Kaathara"	Bappi Lahiri	Chi. Udayashankar	S. P. Balasubrahmanyam
Police Matthu Dada	139	"Laila Laila"	Bappi Lahiri	Chi. Udayashankar	Solo
Puksatte Ganda Hotte Thumba Unda	140	"Kogileye Elliruve"	Hamsalekha	Hamsalekha	S. P. Balasubrahmanyam
Punda Prachanda	141	"Beladingalu Beladingalu"	Hamsalekha	Hamsalekha	K. J. Yesudas
Ramachaari	142	"Burude Burude"	Hamsalekha	Hamsalekha	Mano
Ranachandi	143	"Geetha I Love You"	Sax Raja	Hamsalekha	S. P. Balasubrahmanyam
Ranachandi	144	"Naanyaaro Neene"	Sax Raja	Hamsalekha	S. P. Balasubrahmanyam
Ranachandi	145	"Huccharu Naavu"	Sax Raja	Hamsalekha	S. P. Balasubrahmanyam
Ranachandi	146	"Naanyaaro Neene"	Sax Raja	Hamsalekha	Solo
Rowdy & MLA	147	"Viraha Viraha"	Hamsalekha	Hamsalekha	S. P. Balasubrahmanyam
Rowdy & MLA	148	"Kolu Kolenna Kole"	Hamsalekha	Hamsalekha	S. P. Balasubrahmanyam
Shanti Kranti	149	"Bandano Yamaraaya"	Hamsalekha	Hamsalekha	S. P. Balasubrahmanyam
Shanti Kranti	150	"One Two Three"	Hamsalekha	Hamsalekha	S. P. Balasubrahmanyam
Shivaraj	151	"I Love You"	Hamsalekha	Hamsalekha	S. P. Balasubrahmanyam
Sundara Kanda	152	"Raviya Kiranagale"	Sangeetha Raja	K. V. Raju	Mano
Sundara Kanda	153	"Neenyava Gandu"	Sangeetha Raja	K. V. Raju	Mano
Sundara Kanda	154	"Maleyidenu Hosadide"	Sangeetha Raja	K. V. Raju	Mano
Theja	155	"Oh Cheluva Cheluva"	Hamsalekha	Hamsalekha	S. P. Balasubrahmanyam
Theja	156	"Rannada Rani"	Hamsalekha	Hamsalekha	S. P. Balasubrahmanyam
Theja	157	"Illi Nodu Shiva"	Hamsalekha	Hamsalekha	Solo
Theja	158	"Laila Laila"	Hamsalekha	Hamsalekha	Solo
Veera Dheera	159	"Kemmannu Gundimele"	Hamsalekha	Hamsalekha	S. P. Balasubrahmanyam
Yuddha Parva	160	"O Premave"	Raveendran	R. N. Jayagopal	S. P. Balasubrahmanyam
Yuddha Parva	161	"Hosa Kavya Barede"	Raveendran	R. N. Jayagopal	S. P. Balasubrahmanyam
Antharangada Mrudanga	162	"Vasantha Rajana"	M. Ranga Rao	Gajendra Kote	Solo
Shwethagni	163	"Inde Thaane"	Manoranjan Prabhakar	R. N. Jayagopal	S. P. Balasubrahmanyam

==== 1992 ====
Film	No	Song	Composer(s)	Writer(s)	Co-artist(s)
Aathma Bandhana	164	"Heluvaraarilla Nammanu"	Rajan Nagendra	Chi. Udayashankar	Solo
Aathma Bandhana	165	"Rajeshwari Yogeshwari"	Rajan Nagendra	Chi. Udayashankar	Solo
Aathma Bandhana	166	"Prema Endarenu"	Rajan Nagendra	Chi. Udayashankar	S. P. Balasubrahmanyam
Aathma Bandhana	167	"Nanna Hrudayadali"	Rajan Nagendra	Chi. Udayashankar	S. P. Balasubrahmanyam
Aathma Bandhana	168	"Hatthira Hatthira Nee"	Rajan Nagendra	Chi. Udayashankar	S. P. Balasubrahmanyam
Athimadhura Anuraga	169	"Munjane Surya"	Hamsalekha	Hamsalekha	S. P. Balasubrahmanyam
Athimadhura Anuraga	170	"Raathri Veleyadre"	Hamsalekha	Hamsalekha	Solo
Belli Kalungura	171	"Maama Maama Chandamaama"	Hamsalekha	Hamsalekha	S. P. Balasubrahmanyam
Belli Kalungura	172	"Belli Kalungura"	Hamsalekha	Hamsalekha	S. Janaki
Belli Kalungura	173	"Kelisade Kallu Kallinali"	Hamsalekha	Doddarange Gowda	Solo
Belliyappa Bangarappa	174	"Beda Doora Hogayya"	S. P. Balasubrahmanyam	Chi. Udayashankar	S. P. Balasubrahmanyam
Belliyappa Bangarappa	175	"Ninna Notake"	S. P. Balasubrahmanyam	Chi. Udayashankar	S. P. Balasubrahmanyam
Belliyappa Bangarappa	176	"Belli Modada Mareya"	S. P. Balasubrahmanyam	Chi. Udayashankar	S. P. Balasubrahmanyam
Belliyappa Bangarappa	177	"Sannamma Naanaaru"	S. P. Balasubrahmanyam	Chi. Udayashankar	S. P. Balasubrahmanyam
Chaitrada Premanjali	178	"O Malenadina"	Hamsalekha	Hamsalekha	S. P. Balasubrahmanyam
Chikkejamanru	179	"Nammoora Nyayadevaru"	Hamsalekha	Hamsalekha	S. P. Balasubrahmanyam
Chikkejamanru	180	"Buguri Buguri"	Hamsalekha	Hamsalekha	S. P. Balasubrahmanyam
Chitralekha	181	"Neenu Hennu"	Hamsalekha	Hamsalekha	S. P. Balasubrahmanyam
Chitralekha	182	"Ramanennalenu Ninna"	Hamsalekha	Hamsalekha	S. P. Balasubrahmanyam
Edurmaneli Ganda Pakkadmaneli Hendthi	183	"Meghavu Hariside"	Raj-Koti	R. N. Jayagopal	S. P. Balasubrahmanyam
Gandharva	184	"Attha Nodu Malenadu"	Hamsalekha	Hamsalekha	Solo
Gopi Krishna	185	"Nayakara O Nayaka"	Hamsalekha	Hamsalekha	Mano
Gopi Krishna	186	"Jagavella Jagavella"	Hamsalekha	Hamsalekha	Mano
Gopi Krishna	187	"Chori Chori"	Hamsalekha	Hamsalekha	Mano
Gopi Krishna	188	"Sharadammanavare"	Hamsalekha	Hamsalekha	Mano
Gruhalakshmi	189	"Mellage Ba Mellage"	Raj-Koti	Chi. Udayashankar	S. P. Balasubrahmanyam
Gruhalakshmi	190	"Kho Kho Abbabba"	Raj-Koti	Chi. Udayashankar	S. P. Balasubrahmanyam
Guru Brahma	191	"Varuna Varuna"	Hamsalekha	Hamsalekha	Mano
Guru Brahma	192	"Deepa Deepa Roopa"	Hamsalekha	Hamsalekha	K. J. Yesudas
Guru Brahma	193	"Maduve Maduve"	Hamsalekha	Hamsalekha	K. J. Yesudas, Mano
Halli Krishna Delhi Radha	194	"Beke Idu Beke"	Rajan Nagendra	Chi. Udayashankar	S. P. Balasubrahmanyam
Halli Krishna Delhi Radha	195	"Mutthinda Mathherithu"	Rajan Nagendra	Chi. Udayashankar	S. P. Balasubrahmanyam
Halli Krishna Delhi Radha	196	"Ayyo Ayyo Krishna"	Rajan Nagendra	Chi. Udayashankar	S. P. Balasubrahmanyam
Hatamari Hennu Kiladi Gandu	197	"Hejje Mele Hejje"	Rajan Nagendra	Chi. Udayashankar	S. P. Balasubrahmanyam
Hatamari Hennu Kiladi Gandu	198	"Barede Ninna Hesarannu"	Rajan Nagendra	Chi. Udayashankar	S. P. Balasubrahmanyam
Hatamari Hennu Kiladi Gandu	199	"Sokalu Ee Kai"	Rajan Nagendra	Chi. Udayashankar	Solo
Hosa Raga	200	"Manasugala Sangama"	Sangeetha Raja	Shyamasundar Kulkarni	S. P. Balasubrahmanyam
Hosa Raga	201	"Premiside Naanu"	Sangeetha Raja	Doddarange Gowda	S. P. Balasubrahmanyam
Jhenkara	202	"Namma Colleginalli"	Hamsalekha	Hamsalekha	S. P. Balasubrahmanyam
Jhenkara	203	"Thanu Olage Olava"	Hamsalekha	Hamsalekha	S. P. Balasubrahmanyam
Jhenkara	204	"Naanu Neenu Bereyaadare"	Hamsalekha	Hamsalekha	S. P. Balasubrahmanyam
Jhenkara	205	"Kande Kande Naanu"	Hamsalekha	Hamsalekha	S. P. Balasubrahmanyam
Kaliyuga Seethe	206	"Dinavu Nalide"	Rajan Nagendra	Chi. Udayashankar	S. P. Balasubrahmanyam
Kaliyuga Seethe	207	"Sarasa Sarasa"	Rajan Nagendra	Chi. Udayashankar	S. P. Balasubrahmanyam
Kaliyuga Seethe	208	"Hoovu Beke Hoovu"	Rajan Nagendra	Chi. Udayashankar	Solo
Kaliyuga Seethe	209	"Thattu Innu Thattu"	Rajan Nagendra	Chi. Udayashankar	Solo
Ksheera Sagara	210	"Priya Priya"	Hamsalekha	Chi. Udayashankar	S. P. Balasubrahmanyam
Ksheera Sagara	211	"Kalyani Kalyani"	Hamsalekha	Chi. Udayashankar	S. P. Balasubrahmanyam
Ksheera Sagara	212	"Mysore Mallige"	Hamsalekha	Chi. Udayashankar	S. P. Balasubrahmanyam
Ksheera Sagara	213	"Yaakla Puttnarsa"	Hamsalekha	Chi. Udayashankar	S. P. Balasubrahmanyam
Malashree Mamashree	214	"Bandano Bhoomige"	Raj-Koti	R. N. Jayagopal	S. P. Balasubrahmanyam
Malashree Mamashree	215	"Yaarava Shilpi"	Raj-Koti	R. N. Jayagopal	S. P. Balasubrahmanyam
Malashree Mamashree	216	"Ninnalli Ondadenu"	Raj-Koti	R. N. Jayagopal	S. P. Balasubrahmanyam
Mallige Hoove	217	"Andavo Andavu"	Hamsalekha	Hamsalekha	K. J. Yesudas
Mallige Hoove	218	"Baare Cheluve"	Hamsalekha	Hamsalekha	K. J. Yesudas
Mannina Doni	219	"Male Male"	Hamsalekha	Hamsalekha	S. P. Balasubrahmanyam
Mannina Doni	220	"Nandu Nindu Indu"	Hamsalekha	Hamsalekha	S. P. Balasubrahmanyam
Mannina Doni	221	"Rajanu Rani"	Hamsalekha	Hamsalekha	S. P. Balasubrahmanyam
Megha Mandara	222	"Nanna Mandara"	S. P. Venkitesh	Doddarange Gowda	S. P. Balasubrahmanyam
Megha Mandara	223	"Daddy Preethi"	S. P. Venkitesh	Doddarange Gowda	S. P. Balasubrahmanyam
Megha Mandara	224	"Megha Megha"	S. P. Venkitesh	Doddarange Gowda	Solo
Nagaradalli Nayakaru	225	"Oh Priyathama"	Raj-Koti	R. N. Jayagopal	S. P. Balasubrahmanyam
Nagaradalli Nayakaru	226	"My Darling Sweety"	Raj-Koti	R. N. Jayagopal	S. P. Balasubrahmanyam
Nanna Shathru	227	"Maagi Bandayithu"	Rajan Nagendra	Chi. Udayashankar	S. P. Balasubrahmanyam
Nanna Shathru	228	"Ellelli Nodali"	Rajan Nagendra	Chi. Udayashankar	S. P. Balasubrahmanyam
Nanna Shathru	229	"Jodiyada Dampathi"	Rajan Nagendra	Sri Ranga	S. P. Balasubrahmanyam
Nanna Shathru	230	"Nee Nanna"	Rajan Nagendra	Shyamasundar Kulkarni	S. P. Balasubrahmanyam
Nanna Shathru	231	"Abbabba Ninna Muttalu"	Rajan Nagendra	Geethapriya	S. P. Balasubrahmanyam
Nanna Thangi	232	"Oh Madhuri"	Hamsalekha	Hamsalekha	S. P. Balasubrahmanyam
Police File	233	"Naanu Ondu Kadambari"	Hamsalekha	Hamsalekha	S. P. Balasubrahmanyam
Police File	234	"Chiranjeevi Aagi"	Hamsalekha	Hamsalekha	Solo
Prema Sangama	235	"Jolly Day"	Rajan Nagendra	Chi. Udayashankar	S. P. Balasubrahmanyam
Prema Sangama	236	"Honna Kogile"	Rajan Nagendra	Chi. Udayashankar	S. P. Balasubrahmanyam
Pruthviraj	237	"Chandada Nandanavana"	Sax Raja	Chi. Udayashankar	K. J. Yesudas
Pruthviraj	238	"Adhe Sagara"	Sax Raja	Chi. Udayashankar	K. J. Yesudas
Rajadhi Raja	239	"Ninnalliro Anda"	Vijayanand	R. N. Jayagopal	S. P. Balasubrahmanyam
Rajadhi Raja	240	"Daba Daba Hrudayada Beetu"	Vijayanand	R. N. Jayagopal	S. P. Balasubrahmanyam
Sahasi	241	"Kogile Kogile"	Hamsalekha	Hamsalekha	S. P. Balasubrahmanyam
Shakthi Yukthi	242	"Nalle Ninna"	Manoranjan Prabhakar	Hirannayya	S. P. Balasubrahmanyam
Shambhavi	243	"Ninnane Nambi"	Shankar Ganesh	Chi. Udayashankar	Solo
Shivanaga	244	"Muthugala Ratnagala"	Rajan Nagendra	Chi. Udayashankar	S. P. Balasubrahmanyam
Shivanaga	245	"Baaro Nanna"	Rajan Nagendra	Chi. Udayashankar	S. P. Balasubrahmanyam
Shivanaga	246	"Manmatha Rathiyo"	Rajan Nagendra	Chi. Udayashankar	S. P. Balasubrahmanyam
Shivanaga	247	"Ondu Kottare	Rajan Nagendra	Chi. Udayashankar	Solo
Shivanaga	248	"Harana Koralalli"	Rajan Nagendra	Chi. Udayashankar	Solo
Snehada Kadalalli	249	"Maa Thayi Ganga Maayi"	Raj-Koti	Chi. Udayashankar	Mano
Snehada Kadalalli	250	"Ninna Haage"	Raj-Koti	Chi. Udayashankar	Mano
Snehada Kadalalli	251	"Barpara Bel"	Raj-Koti	Chi. Udayashankar	Mano
Snehada Kadalalli	252	"Jhum Jhum Endendu"	Raj-Koti	Chi. Udayashankar	Mano
Snehada Kadalalli	253	"Nanna Jeevana"	Raj-Koti	Chi. Udayashankar	Mano
Solillada Saradara	254	"Jogayya Jogayya"	Hamsalekha	Hamsalekha	S. P. Balasubrahmanyam
Solillada Saradara	255	"Yaarigagi Hele"	Hamsalekha	Hamsalekha	Manjula Gururaj
Solillada Saradara	256	"Premavendarenu"	Hamsalekha	Hamsalekha	Manjula Gururaj
Sriramachandra	257	"Gaganadali Maleyadina"	Hamsalekha	Hamsalekha	Mano
Sriramachandra	258	"Enaayithu Nanageedina"	Hamsalekha	Hamsalekha	S. P. Balasubrahmanyam
Vajrayudha	259	"Mohini Mohini"	Hamsalekha	Hamsalekha	Solo
Vajrayudha	260	"Tooru Tooru"	Hamsalekha	Hamsalekha	S. P. Balasubrahmanyam

==== 1993 ====
Film	No	Song	Composer(s)	Writer(s)	Co-artist(s)
Aaha Brahmachari	261	"Iralaare Innu Doora"	Raj-Koti	Chi. Udayashankar	S. P. Balasubrahmanyam
Aaha Brahmachari	262	"Nalle Ee Sanje"	Raj-Koti	Chi. Udayashankar	S. P. Balasubrahmanyam, Manjula Gururaj
Aathanka	263	"Hatthu Varushada Hinde"	Hamsalekha	K S Narasimha Swamy	Solo
Abhijith	264	"Akashave"	Sax Raja	Hamsalekha	S. P. Balasubrahmanyam
Abhijith	265	"Hosa Dina"	Sax Raja	Hamsalekha	S. P. Balasubrahmanyam
Abhijith	266	"Prema Solalla"	Sax Raja	Hamsalekha	S. P. Balasubrahmanyam
Alimayya	267	"Kopava Thapava"	M. M. Keeravani	Doddarange Gowda	S. P. Balasubrahmanyam
Alimayya	268	"Yavanavva Cheluvaraya"	M. M. Keeravani	Doddarange Gowda	Solo
Ananda Jyothi	269	"O Priyathama"	Vijayanand	Chi. Udayashankar	S. P. Balasubrahmanyam
Ananda Jyothi	270	"Eno Hosathana"	Vijayanand	Chi. Udayashankar	S. P. Balasubrahmanyam
Angaiyalli Apsare	271	"Amara Madhura Prema"	S. P. Balasubrahmanyam	Chi. Udayashankar	S. P. Balasubrahmanyam
Angaiyalli Apsare	272	"Nanna Danthada Gombe"	S. P. Balasubrahmanyam	Chi. Udayashankar	S. P. Balasubrahmanyam
Annayya	273	"Aa Haage Premiyo"	Hamsalekha	Hamsalekha	S. P. Balasubrahmanyam
Annayya	274	"Ragi Holadaage"	Hamsalekha	Hamsalekha	S. P. Balasubrahmanyam
Annayya	275	"Come On Darling"	Hamsalekha	Hamsalekha	S. P. Balasubrahmanyam
Apoorva Jodi	276	"Anna Banda"	Hamsalekha	Hamsalekha	Mano
Apoorva Jodi	277	"Naari Ninna"	Hamsalekha	Hamsalekha	Mano
Apoorva Jodi	278	"Mysoora Suthalu"	Hamsalekha	Hamsalekha	Mano
Apoorva Jodi	279	"Dukka Illa"	Hamsalekha	Hamsalekha	S. P. Balasubrahmanyam
Baa Nalle Madhuchandrake	280	"Baa Nalle Baa Nalle"	Hamsalekha	Hamsalekha	S. P. Balasubrahmanyam
Bahaddur Hennu	281	"Hoovanthe Mogavu"	Rajan Nagendra	Chi. Udayashankar	S. P. Balasubrahmanyam
Bahaddur Hennu	282	"Kannalle Kollaballenu"	Rajan Nagendra	Chi. Udayashankar	Solo
Bevu Bella	283	"Akashadinda Therinalli"	Hamsalekha	Hamsalekha	S. P. Balasubrahmanyam
Captain	284	"Kadalaala Kaanuthide"	Vijayanand	Chi. Udayashankar	S. P. Balasubrahmanyam
Captain	285	"O Jeeva Ee Nova"	Vijayanand	Chi. Udayashankar	Vinod Raj
Captain	286	"Laali Laali"	Vijayanand	Chi. Udayashankar	Solo
Gadibidi Ganda	287	"Pancharangi Putta"	Hamsalekha	Hamsalekha	S. P. Balasubrahmanyam
Gadibidi Ganda	288	"Gadibidi Ganda Neenu"	Hamsalekha	Hamsalekha	S. P. Balasubrahmanyam
Gadibidi Ganda	289	"Bidde Bidde Bathroomalli"	Hamsalekha	Hamsalekha	S. P. Balasubrahmanyam
Gadibidi Ganda	290	"Muddadendide Mallige Hoo"	Hamsalekha	Hamsalekha	S. P. Balasubrahmanyam
Gadibidi Ganda	291	"Bum Chick Bumbum"	Hamsalekha	Hamsalekha	Solo
Gejje Naada	292	"Malli Malli Minchulli"	V. Manohar	V. Manohar	Solo
Hoovu Hannu	293	"Manju Manju"	Hamsalekha	Hamsalekha	Rajesh Krishnan
Hoovu Hannu	294	"Raamana Paada"	Hamsalekha	Hamsalekha	Solo
Hoovu Hannu	295	"Thaayi Thaayi"	Hamsalekha	Hamsalekha	Dr. Rajkumar
Kadambari	296	"Kaadinolage Samsaara"	Hamsalekha	Hamsalekha	S. P. Balasubrahmanyam
Kempaiah IPS	297	"Shaka Vaishaka"	Hamsalekha	Hamsalekha	S. P. Balasubrahmanyam
Kempaiah IPS	298	"Aashareeravaniya"	Hamsalekha	Hamsalekha	S. P. Balasubrahmanyam
Kempaiah IPS	299	"Munjane Soorya	Hamsalekha	Hamsalekha	Solo
Kempaiah IPS	300	"Aashareeravaniya"	Hamsalekha	Hamsalekha	Solo
Kollura Sri Mookambika	301	"Kanasinali Banda"	Pugalendi Mahadevan	Chi. Udayashankar	Solo
Kollura Sri Mookambika	302	"Amma Daye Baradenu"	Pugalendi Mahadevan	Chi. Udayashankar	Solo
Kumkuma Bhagya	303	"Nanneya Manasemba"	Hamsalekha	Hamsalekha	S. P. Balasubrahmanyam
Kumkuma Bhagya	304	"Ee Lovvige Licenside"	Hamsalekha	Hamsalekha	S. P. Balasubrahmanyam
Kumkuma Bhagya	305	"Thangaalile"	Hamsalekha	Hamsalekha	Solo
Mane Devru	306	"Aarambha Premadarambha"	Hamsalekha	Hamsalekha	S. P. Balasubrahmanyam
Mane Devru	307	"Appa Appa Nange Neenu"	Hamsalekha	Hamsalekha	S. P. Balasubrahmanyam
Mane Devru	308	"Aparanji Chinnavo"	Hamsalekha	Hamsalekha	Mano
Mangalya Bandhana	309	"Jeeva Nanna"	Hamsalekha	Hamsalekha	S. P. Balasubrahmanyam
Mangalya Bandhana	310	"Bisilaadarenu"	Hamsalekha	Hamsalekha	S. P. Balasubrahmanyam
Mangalya Bandhana	311	"Baalu Needalagadavanu"	Hamsalekha	Hamsalekha	S. P. Balasubrahmanyam
Mechhida Madhumaga	312	"Ee Mohada Soundaryake"	Manoranjan Prabhakar	V. Manohar	S. P. Balasubrahmanyam
Mechhida Madhumaga	313	"Baanigeruva Aase"	Manoranjan Prabhakar	V. Manohar	Solo
Midida Hrudayagalu	314	"Chandana Chandanadinda"	Hamsalekha	Hamsalekha	S. P. Balasubrahmanyam
Midida Hrudayagalu	315	"Devaloka Premaloka"	Hamsalekha	Hamsalekha	S. P. Balasubrahmanyam
Mouna Sangrama	316	"Sandhya Sandhya"	Hamsalekha	Hamsalekha	S. P. Balasubrahmanyam
Muddina Maava	317	"Aradhana Premaradhana"	S. P. Balasubrahmanyam	Hamsalekha	S. P. Balasubrahmanyam
Muddina Maava	318	"Varane Maduve Maduve"	S. P. Balasubrahmanyam	Hamsalekha	S. P. Balasubrahmanyam
Munjaneya Manju	319	"Dumbi Dumbi"	Hamsalekha	Hamsalekha	S. P. Balasubrahmanyam
Munjaneya Manju	320	"Munjaneya Manju"	Hamsalekha	Hamsalekha	S. P. Balasubrahmanyam
Munjaneya Manju	321	"Kopaana Madana"	Hamsalekha	Hamsalekha	Solo
Munjaneya Manju	322	"Jeevana Sarigamagala"	Hamsalekha	Hamsalekha	Solo
Nanendu Nimmavane	323	"Kaddu Kaddu"	Rajan-Nagendra	Hamsalekha	S. P. Balasubrahmanyam
Nanendu Nimmavane	324	"Alli Nodalu Rama"	Rajan-Nagendra	Hamsalekha	Solo
Prathiphala	325	"Aatake Chenna"	Sathyam	R. N. Jayagopal	Solo
Prathiphala	326	"Come for the Show"	Sathyam	R. N. Jayagopal	Solo
Rayaru Bandaru Mavana Manege	327	"Adavi Deviya"	Raj-Koti	M. N. Vyasa Rao	S. P. Balasubrahmanyam
Rayaru Bandaru Mavana Manege	328	"Baare Baare Deviye"	Raj-Koti	M. N. Vyasa Rao	S. P. Balasubrahmanyam
Rayaru Bandaru Mavana Manege	329	"Muddina Hudugi Chenda"	Raj-Koti	R. N. Jayagopal	S. P. Balasubrahmanyam
Rayaru Bandaru Mavana Manege	330	"Aparadhi Naanalla"	Raj-Koti	R. N. Jayagopal	S. P. Balasubrahmanyam

=== 2000s ===
==== 2000 ====
Film	Song	Composer(s)	Writer(s)	Co-artist(s)
Chamundi	"Thatta Thatta"	Hamsalekha	Hamsalekha	Archana Udupa, Hemanth
Deepavali	"Mukkoti Suryaniva"	M. M. Keeravani	K. Kalyan	S. P. Balasubrahmanyam
Devara Maga	"Gowdaji Gowdaji"	Hamsalekha	Hamsalekha	S. P. Balasubrahmanyam
Devara Maga	"Ye Bellegowda Gedda"	Hamsalekha	Hamsalekha	S. P. Balasubrahmanyam
Devara Maga	"Bharathappa Namma"	Hamsalekha	Hamsalekha	Hariharan
Devara Maga	"Thayilla Thavarilla"	Hamsalekha	Hamsalekha	Rajesh Krishnan
Galate Aliyandru	"Sagariye Sagariye"	Deva	K. Kalyan	S. P. Balasubrahmanyam
Galate Aliyandru	"Saiyyare Hoye"	Deva	S. Narayan	S. P. Balasubrahmanyam
Hagalu Vesha	"Beladingala Benne Kaddu"	Hamsalekha	Baraguru Ramachandrappa	Rajesh Krishnan
Hagalu Vesha	"Mayaa Jinke"	Hamsalekha	Baraguru Ramachandrappa	Ramesh Chandra
Independence Day	"College College"	Deva	K. Kalyan	
Independence Day	"Namma Thaayi"	Deva	K. Kalyan	Deepika, Swarnalatha
Jeevana Raga	"Ileya Manamohini"	Rajesh Ramanath	Doddarange Gowda	Rajesh Krishnan
Jeevana Raga	"Jeevana Raga"	Rajesh Ramanath	Shyamsundar Kulkarni	S. P. Balasubrahmanyam
Jeevana Raga	"Baalina Yathreyali"	Rajesh Ramanath	Geethapriya	
Krishna Leele	"Chanda O Chanda"	V. Manohar	K. Kalyan	
Krishna Leele	"Keloo Geleyane"	V. Manohar	R. N. Jayagopal	
Naga Devathe	"Murali Ravali"	Hamsalekha	Hamsalekha	S. P. Balasubrahmanyam
Naga Devathe	"Haalundu Hoge Nagamma"	Hamsalekha	Hamsalekha	B. Jayashree
Naga Devathe	"Oora Kaayo Muthaide"	Hamsalekha	Hamsalekha	
O Nanna Nalle	"Kanasugarana Ondu"	V. Ravichandran	V. Ravichandran	
O Nanna Nalle	"Rangu Rangena Halli"	V. Ravichandran	V. Ravichandran	S. P. Balasubrahmanyam
Preethse	"Holi Holi Holi Holi"	Hamsalekha	Hamsalekha	S. P. Balasubrahmanyam, Rajesh Krishnan, Anuradha Paudwal
Shabdavedhi	"Prema Kashmira"	Hamsalekha	Hamsalekha	Dr. Rajkumar
Shabdavedhi	"Thayyare Thayya"	Hamsalekha	Hamsalekha	Dr. Rajkumar
Shabdavedhi	"Oh Gelathi"	Hamsalekha	Hamsalekha	Dr. Rajkumar
Shrirasthu Shubhamasthu	"Belli Bettada Mele"	K. Kalyan	K. Kalyan	S. P. Balasubrahmanyam
Shrirasthu Shubhamasthu	"Bhoodevi Netthi Mele"	K. Kalyan	K. Kalyan	S. P. Balasubrahmanyam
Shrirasthu Shubhamasthu	"Sagaradalli"	K. Kalyan	K. Kalyan	S. P. Balasubrahmanyam
Shrirasthu Shubhamasthu	"Doora Doora Nodidashtu"	K. Kalyan	K. Kalyan	
Soorappa	"Badavar Mane Oota"	Hamsalekha	Hamsalekha	Rajesh Krishnan
Soorappa	"Yaru Kaanda Saptasagara"	Hamsalekha	Hamsalekha	Rajesh Krishnan
Soorappa	"Mangala Ragada"	Hamsalekha	Hamsalekha	Rajesh Krishnan
Sparsha	"Sangaathi Heegeke "	Hamsalekha	Hamsalekha	Rajesh Krishnan
Sparsha	"Oho Chenne Chenne"	Hamsalekha	Hamsalekha	Hariharan
Swalpa Adjust Madkolli	"Baduku Olavina Goodu"	Sadhu Kokila	Srichandru	Rajesh Krishnan
Swalpa Adjust Madkolli	"Chali Chali Eke"	Sadhu Kokila	V. Manohar	Rajesh Krishnan
Yajamana	"O Maina O Maina"	Rajesh Ramanath	K. Kalyan	Rajesh Krishnan
Yajamana	"Mysooru Mallige"	Rajesh Ramanath	K. Kalyan	Rajesh Krishnan
Yajamana	"Shree Gandhada Gombe"	Rajesh Ramanath	K. Kalyan	Rajesh Krishnan
Yajamana	"Namma Maneyali Dinavu"	Rajesh Ramanath	K. Kalyan	S. P. Balasubrahmanyam, Rajesh Krishnan
Yajamana	"Baana Chandrama"	Rajesh Ramanath	K. Kalyan	
Yare Nee Abhimani	"Ramya Krishna"	Hamsalekha	Hamsalekha	Rajesh Krishnan
Yare Nee Abhimani	"Vasa Vasa Srinivasa"	Hamsalekha	Hamsalekha	Rajesh Krishnan
Yare Nee Abhimani	"Hello Usire"	Hamsalekha	Hamsalekha	Rajesh Krishnan
Yare Nee Abhimani	"Yaare Nee Abhimani"	Hamsalekha	Hamsalekha	Srinivas

==== 2001 ====
Film	Song	Composer(s)	Writer(s)	Co-artist(s)
Amma	"Amma Amma"	M. M. Keeravani	R. N. Jayagopal	M. M. Keeravani
Amma	"Munjane Gaganada"	M. M. Keeravani	R. N. Jayagopal	S. P. Balasubrahmanyam
Amma Nagamma	"Yamini Jaamadali"	Gopikrishna	Hamsalekha	Hemanth
Amma Nagamma	"Srichakra Nivasi"	Gopikrishna	Hamsalekha	
Anjali Geethanjali	"O Chandamama"	Prashanth Raj	S. Narayan	S. P. Balasubrahmanyam
Anjali Geethanjali	"Oho Panchamiye"	Prashanth Raj	S. Narayan	Rajesh Krishnan
Anjali Geethanjali	"Beladingale Neenu"	Prashanth Raj	S. Narayan	
Anjali Geethanjali	"Olave Olave"	Prashanth Raj	S. Narayan	
Asura	"Nangu Modalu"	Gurukiran	K. Kalyan	Rajesh Krishnan
Aunty Preethse	"Sneha Deepavali"	L. N. Shastry	K. Kalyan	Rajesh Krishnan, L. N. Shastry, Hemanth
Aunty Preethse	"Preethi Kadalalli"	L. N. Shastry	K. Kalyan	Rajesh Krishnan
Bahala Chennagide	"Holi Holi"	Koti	K. Kalyan	S. P. Balasubrahmanyam
Baanallu Neene Bhuviyallu Neene	"Chaluve Baanallu Neene"	Prashanth Raj	S. Narayan	S. P. Balasubrahmanyam
Baava Baamaida	"Preethi Neenillade"	Hamsalekha	Hamsalekha	Sonu Nigam
Baava Baamaida	"Onti Ontiyagiruvudu"	Hamsalekha	Hamsalekha	S. P. Balasubrahmanyam
Baava Baamaida	"Benna Hinde Bande"	Hamsalekha	Hamsalekha	
Chitte	"Chitte Chitte Haaditu"	V. Manohar	V. Manohar	Rajesh Krishnan
Chitte	"Belaku Iruva Thanaka"	V. Manohar	V. Manohar	Rajesh Krishnan
Chitte	"Nanna Namanagalu"	V. Manohar	V. Manohar	
Gattimela	"Hamsave Hamsave"	Hamsalekha	Hamsalekha	Sonu Nigam
Gattimela	"Navileno Kunibeku"	Hamsalekha	Hamsalekha	
Grama Devathe	"Karamugide"	Dhina	K. Kalyan	
Haalappa	"Oh Mandakini"	Sadhu Kokila	V. Manohar	
Haalappa	"Jambhadambari"	Sadhu Kokila	V. Manohar	Rajesh Krishnan
Jodi	"O Preethiye"	S. A. Rajkumar	R. N. Jayagopal	S. P. Balasubrahmanyam
Kanasugara	"Kaamana Bille"	Rajesh Ramanath	K. Kalyan	S. P. Balasubrahmanyam
Kanasugara	"Suryana Gelethanake"	Rajesh Ramanath	K. Kalyan	S. P. Balasubrahmanyam
Kanasugara	"Koti Pallavi Haaduva"	Rajesh Ramanath	K. Kalyan	
Kanasugara	"Ello Adhu Ello"	Rajesh Ramanath	K. Kalyan	
Kotigobba	"Kaaverige Kaalungura"	Deva	K. Kalyan	S. P. Balasubrahmanyam
Kotigobba	"Thingala Belakina"	Deva	K. Kalyan	S. P. Balasubrahmanyam
Kotigobba	"Vardhana Vishnuvardhana"	Deva	K. Kalyan	S. P. Balasubrahmanyam
Maduve Aagona Baa	"Koti Koti Raga"	Koti - M. M. Srilekha	K. Kalyan	S. P. Balasubrahmanyam
Maduve Aagona Baa	"Mutthina Mutthina"	Koti - M. M. Srilekha	K. Kalyan	S. P. Balasubrahmanyam
Neelambari	"Incharave Incharave"	Rajesh Ramanath	K. Kalyan	
Neelambari	"Malligeya Manasalli"	Rajesh Ramanath	K. Kalyan	
Prema Rajya	"Prathama Chumbana"	Hamsalekha	Hamsalekha	Mano
Premakke Sai	"Olavu Shuruvayitu"	Mani Sharma	K. Kalyan	Hariharan
Shaapa	"Ee Nadiyali"	Hamsalekha	Hamsalekha	Rajesh Krishnan
Sri Manjunatha	"Yaavon Kanda Ninna"	Hamsalekha	Hamsalekha	S. P. Balasubrahmanyam
Sri Manjunatha	"Shri Manjunatha Charite"	Hamsalekha	Hamsalekha	S. P. Balasubrahmanyam
Sri Manjunatha	"Jogappa Jangama"	Hamsalekha	Hamsalekha	S. P. Balasubrahmanyam
Sri Manjunatha	"Ananda Paramananda"	Hamsalekha	Sai Sankeerthi	S. P. Balasubrahmanyam
Sri Manjunatha	"Om Akasharaya Namaha"	Hamsalekha	J. K. Bharavi	Hemanth
Usire	"Janapada Annodu"	Ilaiyaraaja	K. Kalyan	S. P. Balasubrahmanyam
Usire	"Chilipiliyenno Chilipiligale"	Ilaiyaraaja	K. Kalyan	
Vande Matharam	"Hindusthana Gotteno"	Deva	Hamsalekha	S. P. Balasubrahmanyam
Vande Matharam	"Bisi Nettharu"	Deva	V. Nagendra Prasad	
Vishalakshammana Ganda	"Kirana Kirana"	Prashanth Raj	S. Narayan	S. P. Balasubrahmanyam

==== 2002 ====
Film	Song	Composer(s)	Writer(s)	Co-artist(s)
Athma	"Elle Iru"	Prashanth Raj	Bhangee Ranga	
Annayya Thammayya	"Kuhu Kuhu Kogile"	Prashanth Raj	S. Mahendar	
Appu	"Ellinda Aarambhavo"	Gurukiran	Sriranga	Udit Narayan
Appu	"Baare Baare Kalyana Mantappakke"	Gurukiran	Sriranga	Udit Narayan
Boothayyana Makkalu	"Jogada Siri Belakinalli"	Rajesh Ramanath	K. Kalyan	Rajesh Krishnan
Boothayyana Makkalu	"Beladingala Ooralli"	Rajesh Ramanath	K. Kalyan	Rajesh Krishnan
Boothayyana Makkalu	"Oho Chaitrave"	Rajesh Ramanath	K. Kalyan	
Cheluve Ondu Heltheeni	"Oh Nanna Omkarave"	Hamsalekha	Hamsalekha	
Daddy No.1	"Aa Bhaanu Ee Bhoomi"	V. Manohar	V. Manohar	Srikanth
Daddy No.1	"Chaka Chaka Chakamukhi"	V. Manohar	V. Manohar	Gurukiran
Dakota Express	"Jhum Anthu"	Hamsalekha	Hamsalekha	Rajesh Krishnan
Dhruva	"Dina Heege Ninne"	Gurukiran	V. Nagendra Prasad	Kumar Sanu
Dhruva	"Cheluvina Chakori"	Gurukiran	V. Nagendra Prasad	P. Unnikrishnan
Dhumm	"Baa Baa Baara"	Gurukiran	V. Nagendra Prasad	Suresh Wadkar
Hatthura Odeya	"Sooryanu Belakina"	K. Kalyan	K. Kalyan	
Jamindaru	"Hudugi Hudugi"	M. M. Keeravani	S. Narayan	Mano, M. M. Keeravani
Jamindaru	"Sundari Sundari"	M. M. Keeravani	S. Narayan	S. P. Balasubrahmanyam
Jamindaru	"Kande Naa Kande"	M. M. Keeravani	S. Narayan	
Jamindaru	"Veena"	M. M. Keeravani	S. Narayan	
Joot	"Nanna Sundara Kanasu"	Hamsalekha	Hamsalekha	S. P. Balasubrahmanyam
Joot	"Naanu Naanage Illa"	Hamsalekha	Hamsalekha	
Kambalahalli	"Karimani Byale"	Hamsalekha	Hamsalekha	Mano
Kodanda Rama	"Mallehoova Chandano"	V. Ravichandran	V. Ravichandran	L. N. Shastry
Love U	"Idena Prema"	Gurukiran	K. Kalyan	Hariharan
Manasella Neene	"Phala Phala Holeyuva"	Raviraj	Nagathihalli Chandrashekar	
Mutthu	"Chandana Chandana"	Rajesh Ramanath	K. Kalyan	S. P. Balasubrahmanyam
Mutthu	"Ambara Ambaradaache"	Rajesh Ramanath	K. Kalyan	S. P. Balasubrahmanyam
Mutthu	"Ondu Hunnime Chandrana"	Rajesh Ramanath	K. Kalyan	S. P. Balasubrahmanyam
Nagarahavu	"Ede Chippinalli"	Hamsalekha	Hamsalekha	Rajesh Krishnan
Ninagagi	"Hani Hani Seri"	Gurukiran	K. Kalyan	Madhu Balakrishnan
Ninagagi	"Kanninalli Kannanittu"	Gurukiran	K. Kalyan	
Ninne Preethisuve	"Prema Patra Bareyitu"	Rajesh Ramanath	K. Kalyan	Rajesh Krishnan
Ninne Preethisuve	"Kogileya Haadu"	Rajesh Ramanath	K. Kalyan	Rajesh Krishnan
Ninne Preethisuve	"Olave Nanna Olave"	Rajesh Ramanath	K. Kalyan	Rajesh Krishnan
Ninne Preethisuve	"Nanna Preethiya Devathe"	Rajesh Ramanath	K. Kalyan	Rajesh Krishnan
Ninne Preethisuve	"Gudiya Ganteyu"	Rajesh Ramanath	K. Kalyan	Rajesh Krishnan
Ninne Preethisuve	"Ninna Preethiya"	Rajesh Ramanath	K. Kalyan	Rajesh Krishnan
Parva	"Sadhane Paramapada"	Hamsalekha	Hamsalekha	S. P. Balasubrahmanyam
Parva	"Pallavi Thaane"	Hamsalekha	Hamsalekha	S. P. Balasubrahmanyam
Prema	"Ago Ago Kogile"	K. Kalyan	K. Kalyan	
Sainika	"Soldier Soldier"	Deva	Doddarange Gowda	Hariharan
Sainika	"Gombe Gombe"	Deva	Sriranga	Hariharan
Sainika	"Oh Chinna Chinna"	Deva	K. Kalyan	Srinivas
Simhadriya Simha	"Barthanavva Bhupa"	Deva	S. Narayan	S. P. Balasubrahmanyam
Simhadriya Simha	"Yajamana Yajamana"	Deva	S. Narayan	S. P. Balasubrahmanyam
Tapori	"Raathrige Obba"	Hamsalekha	Hamsalekha	
Thavarige Baa Thangi	"Ravivarma Baro Baro"	Hamsalekha	Hamsalekha	S. P. Balasubrahmanyam
Thavarige Baa Thangi	"Jaana Mari Jaana Mari"	Hamsalekha	Hamsalekha	
Thavarige Baa Thangi	"Mutthaide Maathanu"	Hamsalekha	Hamsalekha	Chethan Sosca
Vishwamithra	"Mellusire Savi Mohana"	Upendra Kumar	K. Kalyan	Badri Prasad
Vishwamithra	"O Geleya"	Upendra Kumar	K. Kalyan	
Vishwamithra	"Olavina Geleyana"	Upendra Kumar	K. Kalyan	

==== 2003 ====
Film	Song	Composer(s)	Writer(s)	Co-artist(s)
Ananda	"Yaaradaroo Kandeera"	Rajesh Ramanath	K. Kalyan	
Annavru	"Nanna Jeevave"	Rajesh Ramanath	K. Kalyan	
Bala Shiva	"Natana Visharada"	Hamsalekha	Uma Shivanand	Shankar Shanbog
Chandra Chakori	"Aaha Jhum Taka"	S. A. Rajkumar	S. Narayan	
Chandra Chakori	"Kuhoo Kuhoo Kogile"	S. A. Rajkumar	S. Narayan	
Chandra Chakori	"Kuhoo Kuhoo Kogile "	S. A. Rajkumar	S. Narayan	Hariharan
Daasa	"Nannusire"	Sadhu Kokila	K. Kalyan	
Dhad Dhad	"Hey Hey Hrudayave"	Madhukar	K. Kalyan	Karthik
Dhad Dhad	"Jeenkarisi"	Madhukar	Kaviraj	
Gokarna	"Jwara Illade"	Gurukiran	Kaviraj	Udit Narayan
Heart Beats	"Thangali Ellinda"	Venkat-Narayan	Thangali Nagaraj	Hariharan
Hrudayavantha	"Jumu Jumu Jumutha"	Hamsalekha	Hamsalekha	S. P. Balasubrahmanyam
Hrudayavantha	"Annayya Hrudayavantha"	Hamsalekha	Hamsalekha	Rajesh Krishnan
Hrudayavantha	"Ghama Ghama"	Hamsalekha	Hamsalekha	Mano, Anuradha Sriram
Hudugigagi	"Baaro Chora"	Babji - Sandeep	Shashank	
Hudugigagi	"Ee Usiru"	Babji - Sandeep	Shashank	Bobby
Khushi	"Dinavella Hasivilla"	Gurukiran	Kaviraj	Srinivas
Kiccha	"Meghakke Megha"	Hamsalekha	Hamsalekha	Hariharan
Kiccha	"Nanna Kasthoori"	Hamsalekha	Hamsalekha	Udit Narayan
Kushalave Kshemave	"Nannolave Nannolave"	Rajesh Ramanath	K. Kalyan	Rajesh Krishnan
Laali Haadu	"Olave Nannolave"	Sadhu Kokila	K. Kalyan	Srinivas
Lovve Pasagali	"Giridhara Muraliya"	Hamsalekha	Hamsalekha	
Mani	"Rattho Rattho"	Raja	Yogaraj Bhat	
Ondagona Baa	"Ajja Alad Mara"	Hamsalekha	Hamsalekha	S. P. Balasubrahmanyam
Pakka Chukka	"Yavva Yavva Enayitu"	S. Narayan	S. Narayan	Rajesh Krishnan
Pakka Chukka	"Ghal Ghal Ghal"	S. Narayan	S. Narayan	Rajesh Krishnan
Panchali	"Ku Ku"	Gurukiran	V. Nagendra Prasad	
Paris Pranaya	"Dig Dig Diganthadaachege"	Stephen Prayog	Nagathihalli Chandrashekar	Srinivas
Paris Pranaya	"Aa Biliyara Deshada"	Stephen Prayog	Nagathihalli Chandrashekar	Madhu Balakrishnan, Rajesh Krishnan
Prathidhwani	"Bangara Belli Yeke"	Rajesh Ramanath	K. Kalyan	Rajesh Krishnan, L. N. Shastri
Preethi Prema Pranaya	"Sundara Sundara Lokavidu"	Mano Murthy	K. Kalyan	
Preethi Prema Pranaya	"Ellidde Illi Thanka"	Mano Murthy	V. Nagendra Prasad	Ram Prasad
Sacchi	"Enagide Nange"	Gurukiran	V. Nagendra Prasad	Udit Narayan
Sacchi	"Nanda Kishora"	Gurukiran	V. Nagendra Prasad	
Singaaravva	"Baarappa Soorappa"	C. Ashwath	Gopal Vajpayee	C. Ashwath
Singaaravva	"Kuni Kunidu"	C. Ashwath	Gopal Vajpayee	
Singaaravva	"Ee Manada"	C. Ashwath	Gopal Vajpayee	
Smile	"Chile Chilipile"	V. Manohar	V. Manohar	S. P. Balasubrahmanyam
Smile	"Hey Kan Kan"	V. Manohar	V. Manohar	
Smile	"Kaarirulige"	V. Manohar	V. Manohar	
Swathi Muthu	"Manasu Bareda"	Rajesh Ramanath	V. Nagendra Prasad	Rajesh Krishnan
Swathi Muthu	"Suvvi Suvvi"	Rajesh Ramanath	V. Nagendra Prasad	Rajesh Krishnan
Swathi Muthu	"Sri Chakradharige"	Rajesh Ramanath	V. Nagendra Prasad	
Thayi Illada Thabbali	"Doori Doori"	Hamsalekha	Hamsalekha	Madhu Balakrishnan
Thayi Illada Thabbali	"Ninna Netthimyaale"	Hamsalekha	Hamsalekha	Hemanth
Thayi Illada Thabbali	"Thayi Illa Thavaru Illa"	Hamsalekha	Hamsalekha	
Thayi Illada Thabbali	"Eluthale Eddu"	Hamsalekha	Hamsalekha	
Thayi Illada Thabbali	"Doori Doori"	Hamsalekha	Hamsalekha	

==== 2004 ====
Film	Song	Composer(s)	Writer(s)	Co-artist(s)
Apthamitra	"Anku Donku"	Gurukiran	V. Manohar	S. P. Balasubrahmanyam
Apthamitra	"Pata Pata"	Gurukiran	V. Nagendra Prasad	Udit Narayan
Abbabba Entha Huduga	"Say Say Say Endide"	Suresh Kumar	K. Kalyan	Rajesh Krishnan
Baa Baaro Rasika	"Hotthu Gotthu"	Mahesh	Manjunath Rao	P. Unnikrishnan
Bidalare	"Yenu Naguve"	K. M. Indra	K. M. Indra	Rajesh Krishnan
Bidalare	"Sooryana Kivi Hindi"	K. M. Indra	K. M. Indra	
Bidalare	"Karibasava"	K. M. Indra	K. M. Indra	
Darshan	"Thangali Thangali"	Sadhu Kokila	V. Nagendra Prasad	Sadhu Kokila
Hendthi Andre Hendthi	"Jeeva Gange"	Gopikrishna	K. Kalyan	Rajesh Krishnan
Hendthi Andre Hendthi	"Vandane Hrudayave"	Gopikrishna	K. Kalyan	Rajesh Krishnan
Jyeshta	"O Kanchana"	S. A. Rajkumar	K. Kalyan	Rajesh Krishnan
Jyeshta	"Naaleya Nambikeyu"	S. A. Rajkumar	K. Kalyan	
Kadamba	"Yaamini Yaramma Neenu"	Deva	K. Kalyan	S. P. Balasubrahmanyam
Kadamba	"Chukki Chukki Chukki"	Deva	K. Kalyan	S. P. Balasubrahmanyam
Kalasipalya	"Kencha O Kencha"	Sadhu Kokila	K. Kalyan	Rajesh Krishnan
Kanakambari	"Thangaali Naa"	Praveen D. Rao	K. Kalyan	
Kanti	"Jinu Jinugo"	Gurukiran	Kaviraj	S. P. Balasubrahmanyam
Malla	"Ee Preethiya Marethu"	V. Ravichandran	V. Ravichandran	S. P. Balasubrahmanyam
Malla	"Bangadi"	V. Ravichandran	V. Ravichandran	Mano
Monalisa	"Monalisa Monalisa"	Valisha - Sandeep	V. Nagendra Prasad	Sonu Nigam, Vasundhara Das
Monalisa	"Nannusiru Neene"	Valisha - Sandeep	Doddarange Gowda	
Maurya	"Pilla Pilla Telugu Pilla"	Gurukiran	S. Narayan	Udit Narayan
Om Ganesha	"Manase Manase"	M. N. Krupakar	M. N. Krupakar	Rajesh Krishnan
Preethi Nee Illade Naa Hegirali	"Sangathi Ninna Preethiyalli"	L. N. Shastri	V. Nagendra Prasad	
Rama Krishna	"Gandhadagudi"	S. A. Rajkumar	K. Kalyan	S. P. Balasubrahmanyam
Rama Krishna	"Halli Hudugi"	S. A. Rajkumar	K. Kalyan	
Rama Krishna	"Halli Hudugi (sad)"	S. A. Rajkumar	K. Kalyan	
Ranga SSLC	"Manase Manase"	Sandeep Chowta	V. Nagendra Prasad	Rajesh Krishnan
Sahukara	"Thunta Thunta Thunta"	Rajesh Ramanath	K. Kalyan	Mano
Sahukara	"Maleyaaliya Pada"	Rajesh Ramanath	K. Kalyan	Udit Narayan
Sakhi	"Nannase Hoove"	L. N. Shastri	K. Kalyan	Rajesh Krishnan
Sakhi	"Swagatha"	L. N. Shastri	K. Kalyan	
Saradara	"Kanninalli Preethi Ide"	Venkat - Narayan	Dwaraki	Rajesh Krishnan
Sarvabhouma	"Kal Nanmagandi Prema"	Hamsalekha	Hamsalekha	Hemanth
Thali Kattuva Shubhavele	"Cheluvanu Arasutha"	Robin Gurung	M. N. Vyasa Rao	
Thali Kattuva Shubhavele	"Olavina Madhuvana"	Robin Gurung	M. N. Vyasa Rao	Udit Narayan
Thali Kattuva Shubhavele	"Edeyalli Hithavada"	Robin Gurung	Shyamsundar Kulkarni	Suresh Wadkar
Y2K	"Suryane Niyamava Daati"	Sadhu Kokila	Ram Narayan	Udit Narayan

==== 2005 ====
Film	Song	Composer(s)	Writer(s)	Co-artist(s)
Aakash	"Aaha Entha Aa Kshana"	R. P. Patnaik	K. Kalyan	
Anna Thangi	"Anna Thangiyara Anubandha"	Hamsalekha	Hamsalekha	S. P. Balasubrahmanyam
Anna Thangi	"Dum Dum Dum Thavaralli"	Hamsalekha	Hamsalekha	Udit Narayan
Anna Thangi	"Thavarumane Eega"	Hamsalekha	Hamsalekha	Madhu Balakrishnan, Anuradha Sriram
Anna Thangi	"Anna Nammavanaadaru"	Hamsalekha	Hamsalekha	
Auto Shankar	"Kachhi Kachhi Ninna"	Gurukiran	Kaviraj	Udit Narayan
Boyfriend	"Chandira Chandira"	K. M. Indra	K. M. Indra	
Gowramma	"Ondu Sari Helibidu"	S. A. Rajkumar	Kaviraj	Udit Narayan
Green Signal	"O Sakhi O Sakhi"	Venkat - Narayan	V. Nagendra Prasad	Ramesh Chandra
Gunna	"O My Love"	Mahesh	Dwarki	Rajesh Krishnan
Hai Chinnu	"Jeerige Bellana Haakuva"	Gopikrishna	Hamsalekha	Mano
Hai Chinnu	"Preethi Solode"	Gopikrishna	Hamsalekha	Hariharan
Inspector Jhansi	"Om Namo Namo"	Dilip Sen - Sameer Sen	V. Nagendra Prasad	Kumar Sanu
Inspector Jhansi	"Praya Praya"	Dilip Sen - Sameer Sen	V. Nagendra Prasad	Rajesh Krishnan
Kashi from Village	"Ye Kicchha Kicchha"	Koti	K. Kalyan	Udit Narayan
Kashi from Village	"Goli Maaro"	Koti	K. Kalyan	Udit Narayan
Love Story	"Nanna Ninna Prema Geethe"	S. A. Rajkumar	K. Kalyan	
Love Story	"Hagaluntu Suryanige"	S. A. Rajkumar	K. Kalyan	Hariharan
Maharaja	"Kandamma Kandamma"	S. A. Rajkumar	K. Kalyan	
Maharaja	"Kandamma Kandamma (bit)"	S. A. Rajkumar	K. Kalyan	
Mahasadhvi Mallamma	"Om Shrishaila Vaasaya"	Shrishaila	Goturi	
Mahasadhvi Mallamma	"Sharanembenu"	Shrishaila	Bharath Gowda	
Mahasadhvi Mallamma	"Navarasa Natya"	Shrishaila	Srichandra	B. Prasath
Nammanna	"Chellu Chellu"	Gurukiran	Kaviraj	Hariharan
Nammanna	"Olave Kele"	Gurukiran	Kaviraj	Srinivas
Nenapirali	"Olavu Ontiyalla"	Hamsalekha	Hamsalekha	Chethan Sosca, Ravi Shankar
Nenapirali	"Preethi Paatavalla"	Hamsalekha	Hamsalekha	Chethan Sosca, Ravi Shankar
Nenapirali	"Indu Baanigella Habba"	Hamsalekha	Hamsalekha	
Pandu Ranga Vittala	"Thattu Thattu"	V. Ravichandran	V. Ravichandran	Hemanth
Pandu Ranga Vittala	"Muttu Muttu"	V. Ravichandran	V. Ravichandran	Hemanth
Pandu Ranga Vittala	"Bangaadi Meenu"	V. Ravichandran	V. Ravichandran	Mano
Rama Shama Bhama	"Pade Pade Nenapade"	Gurukiran	Kaviraj	Ramesh Chandra
Rishi	"Ellellu Habba Habba"	Gurukiran	V. Manohar	Sonu Nigam
Shambu	"Radhe Radhe Jeevava"	Ramesh Krishnan	Anand	Rajesh Krishnan
Siddu	"Nee Sheetala"	R. P. Patnaik	Kaviraj	Sonu Nigam
Siri Chandana	"Hayagide Ee Thanu Mana"	S. A. Rajkumar	Chi. Udayashankar	S. P. Balasubrahmanyam
Siri Chandana	"Yaaritta Shapakke"	S. A. Rajkumar	Kaviraj	
Sye	"Koo Koo Maina"	Gurukiran	Kaviraj	Udit Narayan
Thunta	"Dede Dede"	V. Ravichandran	V. Ravichandran	S. P. Balasubrahmanyam
Thunta	"Preethsona Baa"	V. Ravichandran	V. Ravichandran	S. P. Balasubrahmanyam
Ugra Narasimha	"Phalaku Nageya"	Rajesh Ramanath	Mohan	
Valmiki	"Chumma Chumma"	Gurukiran	V. Manohar	Udit Narayan
Varsha	"Kanneerige Kanneerenu"	S. A. Rajkumar	S. Narayan	S. P. Balasubrahmanyam
Vishnu Sena	"Benkikaddi Hachchi"	Deva	V. Nagendra Prasad	S. P. Balasubrahmanyam

==== 2006 ====
Film	Song	Composer(s)	Writer(s)	Co-artist(s)
Shri	"Yaaro Neenu"	Valisha - Sandeep	Kaviraj	Rajesh Krishnan
Shri	"Deepa Deepa"	Valisha - Sandeep	Kaviraj	Rajesh Krishnan
Veeru	"Yello Jogappa"	Anoop Seelin	S. Narayan	
Eesha	"Raagake Swaravaagi"	Teja	Teja	S. P. Balasubrahmanyam
7 O' Clock	"Ee Lokavannu"	M. S. Madhukar	K. Ram Narayan	
My Autograph	"Araluva Hoovugale"	Bharadwaj	K. Kalyan	
Suntaragaali	"Ninnaane Ninnaane"	Sadhu Kokila	Ranganath	Kunal Ganjawala
Hettavara Kanasu	"Atthe Ninage Eega"	Vandemataram Srinivas	K. Kalyan	
Hatavadi	"Chali Chali"	V. Ravichandran	V. Ravichandran	S. P. Balasubrahmanyam
Thandege Thakka Maga	"Jajiya Hoovu Anda"	S. A. Rajkumar	V. Nagendra Prasad	Rajesh Krishnan
Shubham	"Ee Dhamani Dhamani"	Gurukiran	V. Nagendra Prasad	Rajesh Krishnan
Shubham	"Ee Mounava"	Gurukiran	K. Kalyan	Rajesh Krishnan
Shubham	"Hani Hani Ibbani"	Gurukiran	Kaviraj	
Sevanthi Sevanthi	"Maayadanta Male"	S. A. Rajkumar	Traditional	
Ambi	"Hey Hrudaya"	V. Nagendra Prasad	V. Nagendra Prasad	Rajesh Krishnan
Ambi	"Manasige Manasige"	V. Nagendra Prasad	V. Nagendra Prasad	Rajesh Krishnan
Ajay	"Enayitu Nanageedina"	Mani Sharma	K. Kalyan	Kunal Ganjawala
Belli Betta	"Thaye Hele Mallige"	A. T. Raveesh	Basavaraj	
Thavarina Siri	"Aakashadina Ilida Apsare"	Hamsalekha	Hamsalekha	Kunal Ganjawala
Honeymoon Express	"Layi Layi"	R. P. Patnaik	V. Nagendra Prasad	Udit Narayan
Gandugali Kumara Rama	"O Prema"	Gurukiran	M. N. Vyasa Rao	S. P. Balasubrahmanyam
Odahuttidavalu	"Baaro Baaro Maava"	R. P. Patnaik	K. Kalyan	Rajesh Krishnan
Sirivantha	"Koosu Mari"	S. A. Rajkumar	S. Narayan	S. P. Balasubrahmanyam
Sirivantha	"Megha Megha"	S. A. Rajkumar	S. Narayan	Hariharan
Ravi Shastri	"Sangeetha"	Rajesh Ramanath	M. N. Vyasa Rao	Udit Narayan
Tananam Tananam	"Koogalatheya Dooradalli"	K. Kalyan	K. Kalyan	S. P. Balasubrahmanyam
Tananam Tananam	"Cheluvantha Rajakumari"	K. Kalyan	K. Kalyan	Kunal Ganjawala
Tananam Tananam	"Kande Kande Govindana"	K. Kalyan	K. Kalyan	Ajay Warrier
Tananam Tananam	"Tananam Tananam"	K. Kalyan	K. Kalyan	
Student	"Ee Ninna Kalgejje"	R. P. Patnaik	V. Nagendra Prasad	Udit Narayan
Nage Habba	"Ninnadake Vaiyyarake"	S. Adarsha	V. Nagendra Prasad	Rajesh Krishnan
Kallarali Hoovagi	"Ninna Nenapinali"	Hamsalekha	Hamsalekha	Rajesh Krishnan
Kallarali Hoovagi	"Alimola Alimola"	Hamsalekha	Hamsalekha	Rajesh Krishnan
Kallarali Hoovagi	"Nanna Nechhina Koteya"	Hamsalekha	Hamsalekha	Kunal Ganjawala

==== 2007 ====
Film	Song	Composer(s)	Writer(s)	Co-artist(s)
Sixer	"Mel Preethi"	Hamsalekha	Hamsalekha	J. Anoop Seelin
Thayiya Madilu	"Malavalli Malli"	S. A. Rajkumar	S. Narayan	Tippu
Arasu	"Preethi Preethi Ninna"	Joshua Sridhar	Hamsalekha	Karthik
Thangiya Mane	"Neeragi Nelavannu"	Raju Upendra	Doddarange Gowda	
Thangiya Mane	"Ee Hennina Jeevana"	Raju Upendra	Doddarange Gowda	
Bhoopathi	"Chandrana Thangi"	V. Harikrishna	V. Nagendra Prasad	Srinivas
Bhoopathi	"San Sanana Re"	V. Harikrishna	V. Nagendra Prasad	
SMS 6260	"Kannada Thayiya Madilalli"	Ravi Dattatreya	V. Nagendra Prasad	Narayanan Ravindranathan
Parodi	"Huttiruva Manege"	Rajesh Ramanath	M. N. Vyasa Rao	S. P. Balasubrahmanyam
Ekadantha	"Ganapati Bappa"	Gurukiran	V. Manohar	S. P. Balasubrahmanyam
Ekadantha	"Ekadantha"	Gurukiran	Goturi	S. P. Balasubrahmanyam
Preethigaagi	"Ananda Nammi Maneyalli"	S. A. Rajkumar	K. Kalyan	S. A. Rajkumar, Prasanna
Preethigaagi	"Ee Preethi Manasugalu"	S. A. Rajkumar	K. Kalyan	Srinivas
Ee Preethi Ontara	"Ee Preethi Ontara"	Shameer	Kaviraj	Hariharan
Soundarya	"Soundarya Soundarya"	Hamsalekha	Hamsalekha	Sonu Nigam
Masti	"Raviye Vandane"	Gurukiran	K. Kalyan	
Pallakki	"O Priya"	Gurukiran	Kaviraj	
Amrutha Vaani	"Hrudaya Haaduthide"	S. P. Venkatesh	M. N. Vyasa Rao	Kunal Ganjawala
Amrutha Vaani	"Hoovige Dumbee"	S. P. Venkatesh	Doddarange Gowda	Madhu Balakrishnan
Kshana Kshana	"Ondu Kotre"	R. P. Patnaik	K. Kalyan	Udit Narayan
Hudugaata	"Are Are Saaguthide"	Jassie Gift	Jayanth Kaikini	Naresh Iyer
Jambada Hudugi	"Bhoomi Yathe Neenu"	Rajesh Ramanath	K. Kalyan	
Ugadi	"Preethisuve Ninna"	R. P. Patnaik	K. Kalyan	Rajesh Krishnan
Ugadi	"Preethi Endare"	R. P. Patnaik	K. Kalyan	
Ugadi	"Naa Nannagenu"	R. P. Patnaik	K. Kalyan	
Thamashegagi	"Rangeela"	R. P. Patnaik	Kaviraj	Kunal Ganjawala
Snehana Preethina	"Jagave Barali"	V. Harikrishna	V. Nagendra Prasad	S. P. Balasubrahmanyam, Srinivas, SPB Charan, Janani
Snehana Preethina	"Yaaru Ee Bhoomige"	V. Harikrishna	V. Nagendra Prasad	
Ninade Nenapu	"Ibbaniyalli Mindide"	Ram Sampath	Vishweshwara Bhat	
Nali Naliyutha	"Anandada Dumbi"	Rajesh Ramanath	K. Kalyan	
Milana	"Antu Intu Preethi Bantu"	Mano Murthy	Jayanth Kaikini	Udit Narayan
Chanda	"Savi Savi"	S. Narayan	S. Narayan	Shaan
Chanda	"Hogu Manase"	S. Narayan	S. Narayan	S. Narayan
Chanda	"Hogonammi"	S. Narayan	S. Narayan	Karthik
Orata I Love You	"Saddu Saddu"	G. R. Shankar	K. Kalyan	Rajesh Krishnan
Hetthare Hennane Herabeku	"Thayi Thande Emba"	Mano Murthy	Hrudaya Shiva	S. P. Balasubrahmanyam
Hetthare Hennane Herabeku	"Onde Suryana"	Mano Murthy	Kaviraj	S. P. Balasubrahmanyam
Gunavantha	"Kolle Nanna"	Hamsalekha	Hamsalekha	Rajesh Krishnan
Gunavantha	"Hogu Hogu"	Hamsalekha	Hamsalekha	Harish Raghavendra
Naanu Neenu Jodi	"Kagadada Doni"	Hamsalekha	Hamsalekha	Rajesh Krishnan
Ee Preethi Yeke Bhoomi Melide	"Neenene Neenene"	R. P. Patnaik	Kaviraj	Roop Kumar Rathod
Ee Preethi Yeke Bhoomi Melide	"Oh Huduga"	R. P. Patnaik	Kaviraj	Kunal Ganjawala

==== 2008 ====
Film	Song	Composer(s)	Writer(s)	Co-artist(s)
Gaja	"Lambuji"	V. Harikrishna	V. Nagendra Prasad	Shaan
Gaja	"Srikaarane"	V. Harikrishna	V. Nagendra Prasad	
Gaalipata	"Nadheem Dheem Tana"	V. Harikrishna	Yogaraj Bhat	
Honganasu	"Lagge Lagge Sahyadrige"	Hamsalekha	Hamsalekha	Karthik
Honganasu	"Baa Nagu Nanondige"	Hamsalekha	Hamsalekha	Vijay Yesudas
Beladingalagi Baa	"Saari Saari Naa"	Gurukiran	K. Kalyan	Udit Narayan
Yuga Yugagale Saagali	"Nava Pallaviya"	Hamsalekha	Hamsalekha	S. P. Balasubrahmanyam
Marujanma	"Chendulli"	Sri Murali	Kaviraj	Madhu Balakrishnan
Varasdhaara	"Enidu Indu"	Rajesh Ramanath	Shivu Jhamkandi	Karthik
Gooli	"Kaddu Kaddu"	Anoop Seelin	K. Kalyan	Rajesh Krishnan
Gooli	"Dealige Dealu"	Anoop Seelin	K. Kalyan	Shankar Mahadevan, P. N. Sathya
Satya in Love	"Rama Srirama"	Gurukiran	Kaviraj	
Chilipili Hakkigalu	"Guruve"	V. Manohar	C. S. Mahalakshmi	
Akasha Gange	"Malli Malli"	Deva	K. Kalyan	S. P. Balasubrahmanyam
Akasha Gange	"Belagutide"	Deva	K. Kalyan	
Akasha Gange	"Lalli Lalli"	Deva	K. Kalyan	
Akasha Gange	"Nanagagi Ninagagi"	Deva	K. Kalyan	
Akasha Gange	"Nanna Kannu Neenu"	Deva	K. Kalyan	
Akasha Gange	"Kuhu Kogile"	Deva	K. Kalyan	
Kaamannana Makkalu	"Nanna Kanase"	Vidyasagar	Jayanth Kaikini	Hariharan
Nee Tata Naa Birla	"Mutthu Kodala"	Gurukiran	Hrudaya Shiva	Rajesh Krishnan
Moggina Manasu	"Geleya Beku"	Mano Murthy	Jayanth Kaikini	Priya Himesh
Chaitrada Chandrama	"Milana Kaano"	S. Narayan	S. Narayan	Chetan Sosca
Chaitrada Chandrama	"O Jeevada Gelathi"	S. Narayan	S. Narayan	Srinivas
Dheemaku	"Huchcha Annu"	Arjun Janya	V. Nagendra Prasad	Udit Narayan
Patre Loves Padma	"Hingyaake"	Arjun Janya	Chandrashekar Srivastav	Srinivas, Anuradha Sriram
PUC	"Priya Geleya"	J. Raviraj	K. Kalyan	Hemanth
Baa Bega Chandamama	"Ellindalo Thangali"	Murali	Bhangi Ranga	
Premigagi Naa	"Naa Haduve"	Rajesh Ramanath	K. Kalyan	S. P. Balasubrahmanyam
Premigagi Naa	"Preethiya Sundara"	Rajesh Ramanath	K. Kalyan	S. P. Balasubrahmanyam
Nannusire	"Ninagaagiye Ninagaagiye"	Premji Amaren	K. Kalyan	Sri Ram
Maharshi	"Kalyana Rekhe"	Sri Murali	Hrudaya Shiva	Udit Narayan
Bidda	"Luckynova Raja"	Venkat Narayan	Thangali Nagaraj	
Ganga Kaveri	"Ninnalu Nannalu"	K. Kalyan	K. Kalyan	S. P. Balasubrahmanyam
Ganga Kaveri	"Moggina Manasina"	K. Kalyan	K. Kalyan	Ajay Warrier
Akka Thangi	"Dharani Mandala"	V. Manohar	S. Mahendar	
Akka Thangi	"Thangaali"	V. Manohar	K. Kalyan	
Paramesha Panwala	"Thuntarama Puttarama"	V. Harikrishna	V. Nagendra Prasad	Udit Narayan
Neenyare	"Nee Andharenu"	V. Manohar	V. Manohar	

==== 2009 ====
Film	Song	Composer(s)	Writer(s)	Co-artist(s)
Gulama	"Snehithane Snehithane"	Gurukiran	Tushar Ranganath	Srinivas
10th Class A Sec	"Helokagthilla"	R. N. Abhilash	Harishrunga	Kunal Ganjawala
10th Class A Sec	"Bannisalaguvude"	R. N. Abhilash	Hrudaya Shiva	Tippu
Ambari	"Aakasha Neene"	V. Harikrishna	Jayanth Kaikini	
Anjadiru	"Preethi Beku"	Sundar C Babu	Panchajanya	
Bellary Naga	"Sanjeya Thampinalu"	L. N. Shastri	V. Manohar	
Bhagyada Balegara	"Madhu Magalu"	Ilaiyaraaja	Kaviraj	Udit Narayan
Birugaali	"Jojo Laali"	Arjun Janya	Ranganath	
Chandragiri Rahasya	"Preethiya Kadalli"	G. Shekar	Giri	Jayadev
Chellidaru Sampigeya	"Ararare Hrudaya"	S. Narayan	S. Narayan	Kumar Sanu
Chickpete Sachagalu	"Navile Navile"	S. Narayan	S. Narayan	Kunal Ganjawala
Devaru Kotta Thangi	"Obba Thangi Mado Habba"	Hamsalekha	Hamsalekha	Rajesh Krishnan
Devaru Kotta Thangi	"Devaru Kotta Thangi"	Hamsalekha	Hamsalekha	Shankar Mahadevan
Devaru Kotta Thangi	"Nanna Netthige Mutthitta"	Hamsalekha	Hamsalekha	Udit Narayan
Devaru Kotta Thangi	"Ee Loka Katthale"	Hamsalekha	Hamsalekha	C. Ashwath, Vijay Yesudas, Usha, Nandini Hamsalekha
Ee Sambhashane	"Munjane Mussanje"	V. Manohar	V. Manohar	
Hushaar	"Ninna Kandare"	S. Adarsh	S. Adarsh	
Jaaji Mallige	"Mogava Nee Noduveyeke"	Sadhu Kokila	Ram Narayan	Kunal Ganjawala
Kabaddi	"Mutthe Mutthe"	Hamsalekha	Hamsalekha	Karthik
Kempa	"Andu Omme"	Gurukiran	Kaviraj	Kunal Ganjawala
Machcha	"Yaroo Preethi Thanda"	Arjun Janya	Malavalli Saikrishna	Rajesh Krishnan
Namyajamanru	"Dundu Bhoomige"	Hamsalekha	Hamsalekha	S. P. Balasubrahmanyam
Namyajamanru	"Ee Mouna"	Hamsalekha	Hamsalekha	Badri Prasad, Anuradha Bhat
Nannedeya Haadu	"Yeranneri Holeva"	A. T. Raveesh	Sridhar Koteshwara	
Ninagaagi Kaadiruve	"Bahumanavade Neenu"	Robin Gurung	V. Nagendra Prasad	Shaan
Ninagaagi Kaadiruve	"Bahumanavade Neenu (solo)"	Robin Gurung	V. Nagendra Prasad	
Ninagaagi Kaadiruve	"Jhum Jhummennuva"	Robin Gurung	Srichandra	
Salute	"Heegene Onchooru"	Sai Karthik	Jayanth Kaikini	Karthik
Seena	"Jeeva Midiyuthide"	A. T. Raveesh	Kaviraj	Hariharan
Shishira	"Elliruve Hegiruve"	B. Ajaneesh Lokanath	K. Kalyan	
Shishira	"Thumbu Hunnimeyali"	B. Ajaneesh Lokanath	Prof M. Krishnegowda	
Thabbali	"Jolaali Jo"	A. M. Neel	Sridevi	
Yodha	"Namm India"	Hamsalekha	Hamsalekha	

=== 2010s ===
==== 2010 ====
Film	Song	Composer(s)	Writer(s)	Co-artist(s)
Samagama	"O Nanna Preethiya"	Kiran	Subraya Chokkadi	
Preethiya Theru	"Yenidennu Maya"	Prasad	V. Nagendra Prasad	Vijay Yesudas
School Master	"Chinnumari Pappumari"	V. Sridhar	V. Manohar	S. P. Balasubrahmanyam
Jugaari	"Ninna Naanu Nodovaregu"	Arjun Janya	K. Kalyan	Rajesh Krishnan
Premism	"Arashina Kumkuma"	Hamsalekha	Hamsalekha	
Bombat Car	"Nanna Muddu Thangi"	Deva	Dwarki Raghava	Rajesh Krishnan
Shankar IPS	"Chumbaka"	Gurukiran	Kaviraj	Vijay Prakash
Hoo	"Sarigama Sari"	V. Harikrishna	V. Ravichandran	S. P. Balasubrahmanyam
Hoo	"Dheem Dheem"	V. Harikrishna	V. Ravichandran	S. P. Balasubrahmanyam
Sanchaari	"Bhoomi Sutthodu"	Arjun Janya	V. Nagendra Prasad	Sonu Nigam
Mathe Mungaru	"Hey Janmabhoomi"	Paul Raj	Dwarki Raghava	Vijay Prakash
Preethi Hangama	"Himse Himse"	Raj Kiran	Kaviraj	Karthik
Jothegara	"Muthaiderella Seri"	Sujeeth Shetty	Jhamkandi Shivu	Madhu Balakrishnan
Bisile	"Kanda Kanasugalu"	Gagan Baderiya	K. Kalyan	
Mylari	"Ghallu Ghallenutha"	Gurukiran	Kaviraj	S. P. Balasubrahmanyam

==== 2011 ====
Film	Song	Composer(s)	Writer(s)	Co-artist(s)
Sri Naga Shakthi	"Shubhadaayini"	Sri Ganesh	Goturi	Remo
Sri Naga Shakthi	"Sri Nagashakthiye"	Sri Ganesh	Goturi	
Ee Sanje	"Eno Onthara"	Jai Shiva	Hemanth Das	S. P. Balasubrahmanyam
Kalgejje	"Yeko Hrudaya"	Gandharva	Gandharva	
Shravana	"Kanasugala Koteyalli"	Karthik Bhoopathi	B. S. Rajashekar	Vaishali sisters
Hori	"Kogilegu"	Renukumar	V. Srikanth	Hariharan
Atheetha	"Mathe Mathe Nodthale"	Emil	Kaviraj	Hemanth Kumar
Vinayaka Geleyara Balaga	"Ondinchu Kannalli"	V. Harikrishna	V. Nagendra Prasad	Vijay Prakash
Taare	"Manasaare"	C. R. Bobby	Hrudaya Shiva	P. Unnikrishnan

==== 2012 ====
Film	Song	Composer(s)	Writer(s)	Co-artist(s)
Tsunami	"Mailaari"	Sadguna Raj	Sri Manohar	Srinivas
Tsunami	"Male Male"	Sadguna Raj	Sri Manohar	L. N. Shastry
Arakshaka	"Kuch Kuch"	Gurukiran	Kaviraj	Vijay Yesudas
Silence	"Jayamalini Neenena"	Vijaya Bharathi	Kannadiga Shivu	Hemanth
Paper Doni	"Helalu Aagadu"	Srisuman	Kaviraj	Rajesh Krishnan
Preethiya Loka	"Baanalli Theli Hodanthe"	Sai Kiran	Ravishankar Nag	Karthik
18th Cross	"Suriyo Suriyo"	Arjun Janya	Shivananje Gowda	Tippu
Gokula Krishna	"Idhu Preethi Ennale"	S. A. Rajkumar	Hrudaya Shiva	
Gokula Krishna	"Taju Mahalige Belliya"	S. A. Rajkumar	V. Nagendra Prasad	Karthik
Krantiveera Sangolli Rayanna	"Nannede Veene"	Yashovardhan	Keshavadithya	Sonu Nigam, Prakash Sontakke

==== 2013 ====
Film	Song	Composer(s)	Writer(s)	Co-artist(s)
Ee Bhoomi Aa Bhanu	"Anudina Neenu"	S. Prem Kumar	Siddalingaiah	S. Prem Kumar
Chandra	"Omkaradalli Jhenkara Ivanu"	Gautham Srivatsa	V. Nagendra Prasad	Madhu Balakrishnan
Nanda Gokula	"Mohana Raaga"	Madan Mohan	Narasimha M. Joshi	
Nanda Gokula	"Kanmuchchi Kandantha"	Madan Mohan	Narasimha M. Joshi	Madan Mohan

==== 2014 ====
Film	Song	Composer(s)	Writer(s)	Co-artist(s)
Love in Mandya	"Ondu Aparoopada Gaana"	Anoop Seelin	Arasu Anthare	Rajesh Krishnan
Baanaadi	"Bhoomi Ninna Thaayi"	Karthik Sharma	M. N. Vyasa Rao	

==== 2015 ====
Film	Song	Composer(s)	Writer(s)	Co-artist(s)
Mirchi Mandakki Kadak Chai	"Haage Bandu"	Harikavya	K. Kalyan	Rajesh Krishnan
Om Namaha	"Shuruna Shuruna"	Arjun Janya	Kaviraj	
Ganga	"Chukki Chukki"	Arjun Janya	K. Kalyan	Anuradha Bhat
Prema Pallakki	"Sammathiya Kelade"	Vineeth Raj	M. R. Shekar	

==== 2016 ====
Film	Song	Composer(s)	Writer(s)	Co-artist(s)
Priyanka	"Gange Thaayaane"	M. N. Krupakar	Keshav Chandra	Unni Menon
Priyanka	"O Geleya"	M. N. Krupakar	Keshav Chandra	Unni Menon
Jessie	"Maaye Neenondu Maaye"	Anoop Seelin	Jayanth Kaikini	Siddhartha Belmannu

==== 2017 ====
Film	Song	Composer(s)	Writer(s)	Co-artist(s)
Urvi	"Kanna Hani"	Manoj George	Suvarna Sharma	

==== 2018 ====
Film	Song	Composer(s)	Writer(s)	Co-artist(s)
Brihaspathi	"Amma Nannamma"	V. Harikrishna	Pradyumna	Santhosh Venky
Nanagishta	"Yaaro Bhoomige Hore"	Nanditha Rakesh	Hamsalekha	
Edakallu Guddada Mele	"Amma"	Ashik Arun	Kiran Kaverappa	
Edakallu Guddada Mele	"Nee Kareda"	Ashik Arun	Do Rah	

==== 2019 ====
Film	Song	Composer(s)	Writer(s)	Co-artist(s)
Kaddu Muchchi	"Date Guarantee"	Hamsalekha	Hamsalekha	S. P. Balasubrahmanyam
Ombathane Adbhutha	"Shuruvayitu Eno"	Sunil Koshy	Venu Krishna	Sunil Koshy
Ombathane Adbhutha	"Shuruvayitu Eno - Solo"	Sunil Koshy	Venu Krishna	

=== 2020s ===
Year	Film	Song	Composer(s)	Writer(s)	Co-artist(s)
2020	3rd Class	"Yaaro Yaaro"	Jassie Gift	Kaviraj	
2020	3rd Class	"Dayamadi Nanna"	Jassie Gift	Kaviraj	Jassie Gift
2021	Kotigobba 3	"Kanda Kanda"	Arjun Janya	V. Nagendra Prasad	
2023	South Indian Hero	"Savi Saviyo"	Harshavardhan Raj	Eeshwar Shyamarao	Yazin Nizar
2024	Krishnam Pranaya Sakhi	"Ninna Hegalu"	Arjun Janya	Kaviraj	
2024	The Rulers	"Nanna Muddu Kanda"	Karun KGF	V. Nagendra Prasad	
2025	1990's	"Male Haniye"	E. C. Maha Raja	Mohini Sachin Amin	E. C. Maha Raja
2025	Jai Gadakesari	"Ee Manada"	Karthik Venkatesh	Karthik Venkatesh	
2025	Love You Muddu	"Eegeega Nanagantu"	Aniruddha Sastry	Siddu Kodipura	Aniruddha Sastry
2026	Raktha Kashmira	"Kashmira"	Gurukiran	Kaviraj	Srinivas
2026	Brindavihari	"Ondhe Ondu"	Hesham Abdul Wahab	V. Nagendra Prasad	Jaskaran Singh

== Bengali songs ==
This is Incomplete list

Year	Film	Song	Composer(s)	Co-artist(s)
1994	Naag Panchami	"Aayre Bosonto Aay"	Prafulla Kar	S P Balasubrahmanyam
1994	Naag Panchami	"Jonmo Jonmo Nebo tomay Cheye"	Prafulla Kar	S P Balasubrahmanyam
1994	Naag Panchami	"Dialogues"	Prafulla Kar	S P Balasubrahmanyam
1994	Naag Panchami	"Boudi Gorom Dudhta Kheye Nao"	Prafulla Kar	S P Balasubrahmanyam
1994	Naag Panchami	"Chal Chal Haati Tui"	Prafulla Kar	solo
1994	Naag Panchami	"Nag Panchami"	Prafulla Kar	solo
1999	Shudhu Ekbar Bolo	"Bolo Sudhu Ek Baar"	Babul Bose	Babul Supriyo
1999	Shudhu Ekbar Bolo	"Hey Gore Gore America"	Babul Bose	Babul Supriyo
1999	Shudhu Ekbar Bolo	"Kokila Kokila Tu Gaye"	Babul Bose	Babul Supriyo
1999	Shudhu Ekbar Bolo	"Oh Daddy Daddy"	Babul Bose	Babul Supriyo

== Odia songs ==
This is Incomplete list

Year	Film	Song	Composer(s)	Co-artist(s)
1992	Naga Panchami	"Mani Nageshwari"	Prafulla Kar	
1992	Naga Panchami	"Zanama Zanama"	Prafulla Kar	Mahaprasad Kar
1994	Pacheri Uthila Majhi Duaru	"Sajani Mo Sajani"	Prafulla Kar	Debasish
1994	Pacheri Uthila Majhi Duaru	"To Premare"	Prafulla Kar	Debasish
1995	Mani Nageswari	"Kana Kalu Kana Kalu"	Akshaya Mohanty	
1995	Mani Nageswari	"He Naga Mata"	Akshaya Mohanty	
1995	Mani Nageswari	"Ete Dina Gala Pare"	Akshaya Mohanty	
1999	Sarpanch Babu	"Sundara Muhan Ku"	Amarendra Mohanty	Mano
1999	Sarpanch Babu	"Dauna Dauna"	Amarendra Mohanty	Mano
1999	Sasu Hatakadi Bhauja Bedi	"Suna Ama Ghara"	Akshaya Mohanty	Bhibu Das
1999	Sasu Hatakadi Bhauja Bedi	"Ku Ku Ku Ku Kuhu"	Akshaya Mohanty	Badri Narayan Mohanty
1999	Sasu Hatakadi Bhauja Bedi	"Fusuru Fusuru"	Akshaya Mohanty	Badri Narayan Mohanty
1999	Sasu Hatakadi Bhauja Bedi	"Chuna Hela Ei Sunara"	Akshaya Mohanty	

== Tulu songs ==
Year	Movie	Song	Composer(s)	Co-artist(s)
2014	Madime	"Taka Taka"	A K Vijay	Solo

== Marathi songs ==
Year	Film	Song	Composer(s)	Writer(s)	Co-artist(s)
2023	Ratricha Paus	"Tula Mi"	Pranav Jantikar	Parijit Khokle	Pranav Jantikar
2025	”Majhi Prarthana”	"Tujhya Premachi”	Viswajith C. T.	Padmaraj Rajgopal Nair	solo
2025	”Majhi Prarthana”	“Me Jagtoy Karan”	Viswajith C. T.	Padmaraj Rajgopal Nair	Viswajith C. T.
2025	”Majhi Prarthana”	”Sangayche Aahe”	Vishwajith C. T.	Padmaraj Rajgopal Nair	Vishwajith C. T.

== Punjabi songs ==
Year	Album	Song	Composer(s)	Co-artist(s)
2000	Sunset Point	"Pakhiyan Ve"	Vishal Bhardwaj	Solo
1995	Maaman Magal	Choori Choori chupke chupke	Adithyan	Gurdas Mann

== Rajasthani songs ==
Year	Album	Song	Composer(s)	Co-artist(s)
2000	Piya Basanti	"Rangeelo Rut" “Sawan Rut Ayi”	Sandesh Shandilya	Ustad Sultan Khan
2006	Ustad And The Divas	"Thaari Ghoomar Chay"	Sandesh Shandilya	Ustad Sultan Khan

== English songs ==
Year	Album / Film	Song	Composer(s)	Co-artist(s)
2005	Heart Beats	"Wake Me Up"	Balabhaskar	George Peters
2009	Fantasy Ride	"Turn Tables"	Ciara	Ciara
2010	The Imagine Project	"The Song Goes on"	Herbie Hancock	Chaka Khan, Anoushka Shankar, Wayne Shorter
2014	Million Dollar Arm	"Unborn Child"	A R Rahman	P. Unnikrishnan

== Latin songs ==
Year	Album / Film	Song	Composer(s)	Co-artist(s)
2005	Gloria	"Adeste Fideles" “Laudate dominum”	Jerry Amaldev	Chorous

== Arabic songs ==
Year	Album / Film	Song	Composer(s)	Co-artist(s)
2009	Amrelhob	"Amrelhob"	Jawed Al Ali	Jawed Al Ali
