= List of Tamil films of 1989 =

Post-amendment to the Tamil Nadu Entertainments Tax Act 1939 on 1 April 1958, Gross jumped to 140 per cent of Nett Commercial Taxes Department disclosed ₹69 crore in entertainment tax revenue for the year.

The following is a list of films produced in the Tamil film industry in India in 1989, presented in alphabetical order.

== Released films ==
Title	Director	Producer	Music	Cast
Aararo Aariraro	K. Bhagyaraj	Shantanoo Cine Combines	K. Bhagyaraj	K. Bhagyaraj, Bhanupriya, Manorama, Jai Ganesh
Anbu Kattalai	Yaar Kannan	Sri Gayathri Cine Arts	Ilaiyaraaja	Ramarajan, K. R. Vijaya, Pallavi, Goundamani, Senthil,
Andru Peytha Mazhaiyil	Ashok Kumar	Film Merchants International	Thayanban	Sarath Babu, Silk Smitha, Saranya, Y. G. Mahendra
Annakili Sonna Kathai	S. Devarajan	Sri Ananda Lakshmi Fim Combines	Chandrabose	Sathyaraj, Sudha Rani, Malaysia Vasudevan, Kamala Kamesh
Annanukku Jai	Gangai Amaran	Sri Vijaya Jagathambal Films	Ilaiyaraaja	Arjun, Seetha, Kiruthika, Vennira Aadai Moorthy, Chinni Jayanth, Charle
Apoorva Sagodharargal	Singeetam Srinivasa Rao	Raaj Kamal Films International	Ilaiyaraaja	Kamal Haasan, Gautami, Srividya, Rupini, Janagaraj, Manorama
Athaimadi Methaiadi	K. S. Gopalakrishnan	C. R. Production	S. R. Vasu	K. S. G. Venkatesh, Pallavi, Ilavarasi, S. S. Chandran, Prameela
Chinna Chinna Aasaigal	Muktha S. Sundar	Muktha Films	Chandrabose	Pandiarajan, Rasika, S. S. Chandran
Chinnappadass	C. V. Rajendran	Seethalakshmi Art Films	Ilaiyaraaja	Sathyaraj, Radha, S. S. Chandran, Kuyili
Dharma Devan	A. L. N. Mohan	Yovana Sasivarnam Combines	Shankar–Ganesh19 திஞா	Rajesh, Nizhalgal Ravi, Murali, B. Saroja Devi, Divya, Indira, S. S. Chandran, Manorama, Vinu Chakravarthy, Malaysia Vasudevan, Vennira Aadai Moorthy, Chinni Jayanth, Disco Shanti, Charle
Dharmam Vellum	K. Rangaraj	Kala Chithra	Ilaiyaraaja	Vijayakanth, Sujatha, Gautami, Rohini, S. S. Chandran, Senthil, Kovai Sarala
Dilli Babu	Chitralaya Gopu	Vasan Brothers	Gangai Amaran	Pandiarajan, Seetha, Yamuna, S. S. Chandran, Chinni Jayanth, Disco Shanti, Kovai Sarala
Dravidan	R. Krishnamoorthy	Suresh Arts	M. S. Viswanathan	Sathyaraj, Ambika, Vidhyashree, Jaishankar, Srividya, Suparna Anand, Monisha Unni, S. S. Chandran
Ellame En Thangachi	Bala Ganesh	Sri Dhandapani Creations	Gangai Amaran	Pandiarajan, Ramki, Nishanthi, Raasi, S. S. Chandran
En Arumai Manaivi	Jai Kumar	Manoranjitham Pictures	M. S. Viswanathan	K. R. Vijaya, Jai Kumar, Rajyalakshmi, Sabitha Anand, Goundamani, Disco Shanti, Loose Mohan, Senthamarai, Idichapuli Selvaraj, Oru Viral Krishna Rao, Gandhimathi
En Kanavar	Ashwini Kumar	Sri Thennakudi Mariamman Films	Sangeetha Rajan	Ramki, Nirosha, Raghuvaran
En Purushanthaan Enakku Mattumthaan	Manobala	Manthralaya Cine Creations	Ilaiyaraaja	Vijayakanth, Suhasini, Rekha, Janagaraj, V. K. Ramasamy
En Rathathin Rathame	K. Vijayan; Sundar K. Vijayan	Sujatha Cine Arts	Shankar–Ganesh	K. Bhagyaraj, Meenakshi Seshadri, Janagaraj
En Thangai	A. Jagannathan	Sathya Movies	S. A. Rajkumar	Arjun, Gautami, Vaishnavi, S. S. Chandran, Kuyili, Charle
Enga Annan Varattum	R. Krishnamoorthy	Sri Rajakali Amman Enterprises	Gangai Amaran	Arjun, Rupini, Aruna, Senthil
Enga Ooru Mappillai	T. P. Gajendran	Citizen Films	Ilaiyaraaja	Ramarajan, Gautami, Goundamani, Senthil, Kovai Sarala, Kuyili
Enga Veettu Deivam	T. R. Ramesh-Nandha Kumar	Saroj Movie International	Shankar–Ganesh	Nizhalgal Ravi, Pallavi, S. S. Chandran, Chithra, Sathyakala, Kovai Sarala
Enne Petha Raasa	Siraaj	Redsun Art Creations	Ilaiyaraaja	Ramarajan, Rupini, Srividya, Rajkiran, Goundamani, Vinu Chakravarthy, Senthil
Idhaya Dheepam	B. Nithyanandam	Manju Cine Creation	Chandrabose	Mohan, Rekha, Nizhalgal Ravi, Chinni Jayanth, Kovai Sarala, Charle
Idhu Unga Kudumbam	S. Umesh	Sri Devi Kala Chitra	Hamsalekha	Raghuvaran, Radhika, Urvashi
Kaalathai Vendravan	Mohan Gandhiram	Bharath Cine Creations	Shankar–Ganesh	M. G. Ramachandran
Kaaval Poonaigal	Kalaipuli G. Sekaran	Renuka Distributors	Sangeetha Rajan	Radhika, Nizhalgal Ravi, Bhanu Chander, Manjula
Kadhal Enum Nadhiyinile	M. K. I. Sukumaran	J. A. Movie Combines	Manoj–Gyan	Seetha, Pandiyan, Shankar
Kai Veesamma Kai Veesu	Vinodh	M. B. C. Arts	Ilaiyaraaja	Radhika, Murali, Nirosha, Rajyalakshmi, S. S. Chandran, Kovai Sarala, Chinni Jayanth
Kakka Kadi	N. S. Ramesh Khanna	Rajan Movies	Pandiarajan	Pandiarajan, Rekha
Karakattakkaran	Gangai Amaran	Vijaya Movies	Ilaiyaraaja	Ramarajan, Kanaka, Chandrasekhar, Goundamani, Senthil, Kovai Sarala
Karunguyil Kundram	Rajasekhar			Charan Raj, Saranya Ponvannan, Pandiyan
Kuttravali	L. Raja	Sujatha Cine Arts	Chandrabose	Raghuvaran, Charan Raj, Rekha, Devi Lalitha, Nizhalgal Ravi
Manandhal Mahadevan	Rama Narayanan	Murali Cine Arts	Shankar–Ganesh	S. Ve. Shekher, Pallavi, Janagaraj, S. S. Chandran, Kovai Sarala, Kuyili
Manasukketha Maharasa	Deenadayal	Irusaar Amman Movies	Deva	Ramarajan, Seetha, Nizhalgal Ravi, Madhuri, Goundamani, Senthil
Manidhan Marivittan	Manivannan	Kamala Jothi Combines	Shankar–Ganesh	Mohan, Chithra, Janagaraj, Vinu Chakravarthy, Gandhimathi, Chinni Jayanth, Charle
Mappillai	Rajasekhar	Geetha Arts	Ilaiyaraaja	Rajinikanth, Amala, Srividya, Jaishankar, S. S. Chandran
Meenakshi Thiruvilayadal	K. Shankar	Lakshmi Ganapathi Combines	M. S. Viswanathan	Vijayakanth, Radha, Sirkazhi Govindarajan, M. N. Nambiar, Jai Ganesh, Sumithra, Ramya Krishnan, Manorama
Moodu Manthiram	Manobala	Kaiser Creations	Shankar–Ganesh	Prabhu, Rekha, Nizhalgal Ravi, Madhuri, Janagaraj, S. S. Chandran, Kovai Sarala, Disco Shanti, Lalitha Kumari
Mundhanai Sabatham	Senthilnathan	Anand & Anand	Chandrabose	M. R. Yogaraj, Ilavarasi, Senthil, Goundamani
Naalai Manithan	Velu Prabhakaran	Perfect Production	Premi-Srini	Prabhu, Amala, Jaishankar, Janagaraj, Jayashree, Thakkali Srinivasan, Ajay Rathnam, Disco Shanti
Nee Vandhal Vasantham	A. Radhakrishnan	Poonga Films	Devendran	Vasantha Rajan, Sudha
Ninaivu Chinnam	Anu Mohan	Tamil Nadu Movies	Ilaiyaraaja	Prabhu, Radhika, Murali, Chithra, Goundamani, Senthil, S. S. Chandran
Nyaya Tharasu	K. Rajeshwar	Menaka Pictures	Shankar–Ganesh	Nizhalgal Ravi, Radha, Ra. Sankaran, Vijayan, Disco Shanti, Renuka, Priya, Charle
Ore Oru Gramathiley	K. Jyothi Pandian	Aeris Enterprises	Ilaiyaraaja	Lakshmi, Nizhalgal Ravi, Kamala Kamesh, Poornam Viswanathan, Vinu Chakravarthy, Senthil
Orey Thaai Orey Kulam	S. Jagadeesan	Om Sakthi Internationals	K. V. Mahadevan	B. Saroja Devi, Srividya, Nizhalgal Ravi
Oru Ponnu Nenacha	K. Chozharajan	Mayura Cine Arts	S. A. Rajkumar	Mohan, Radha
Oru Thottil Sabadham	Bharathi Mohan	Uthra Movie Makers	Chandrabose	Ramki, Seetha, Ravichandran
Paandi Nattu Thangam	T. P. Gajendran	Meenakshi Arts	Ilaiyaraaja	Karthik, Nirosha, S. S. Chandran, Senthil, Kovai Sarala, Y. Vijaya
Paasa Mazhai	Adhavan	Poompuhar Production	Ilaiyaraaja	Mohan, Radhika, Urvashi, Chandrasekhar
Paattukku Oru Thalaivan	Liaquat Ali Khan	Tamil Annai Cine Creation	Ilaiyaraaja	Vijayakanth, Shobana, M. N. Nambiar, K. R. Vijaya, S. S. Chandran, Janagaraj, Senthil, Kovai Sarala
Padicha Pulla	Senthilnathan	Sri Chowdeswari Pictures	Ilaiyaraaja	Arjun, Seetha, S. S. Chandran, Manorama, Senthil, Kovai Sarala, Silk Smitha
Penn Buthi Pin Buthi	Senthilnathan	AVM Productions	Chandrabose	Ramki, Gautami, Sujatha, Goundamani, Senthil, Sudha, Disco Shanti
Pickpocket	G. M. Kumar	K. B. Films	Ilaiyaraaja	Sathyaraj, Radha, S. S. Chandran, Silk Smitha
Pillaikkaga	P. Vasu	Sri Rajakali Amman Pictures	Gangai Amaran	Prabhu, Gautami, Rupini, Nassar, Rekha
Pongi Varum Kaveri	T. K. Bose	Manorama Movies	Ilaiyaraaja	Ramarajan, Gautami, Sripriya, S. S. Chandran, Disco Shanti, Kovai Sarala
Ponmana Selvan	P. Vasu	V. N. S. Films	Ilaiyaraaja	Vijayakanth, Shobana, Vidhyashree, Gemini Ganesan, B. Saroja Devi, V. K. Ramasamy, Goundamani, S. S. Chandran
Ponnu Paaka Poren	N. Murugesh	Lakshmi Raja Films	K. Bhagyaraj	Prabhu, Seetha, Mano, Janagaraj, Kovai Sarala
Poo Manam	S. Rajasekaran	N. K. Film Combines	Vidyasagar	Rajasekaran, Mahalakshmi, Janagaraj
Poruthathu Pothum	P. Kalaimani	Kamala Chithram	Ilaiyaraaja	Vijayakanth, Nirosha, Ranjini, Jaishankar, Srividya, Kamala Kamesh, S. S. Chandran
Pudhea Paadhai	R. Parthiepan	Vivek Chitra	Chandrabose	R. Parthiepan, Seetha, V. K. Ramasamy, Manorama, Kuyili
Pudhu Mappillai	P. S. Subramaniam	Sri Bala Murali Combines	Gangai Amaran	Pandiarajan, Jaishankar, Ranjini, Anuradha, Vennira Aadai Moorthy, Charle
Pudhu Pudhu Arthangal	K. Balachander	Kavithalayaa Productions	Ilaiyaraaja	Rahman, Sithara, Geetha, Jayachitra, Janagaraj, Lalitha Kumari
Raaja Raajathan	E. Ramadas	Danisha Pictures	Ilaiyaraaja	Ramarajan, Gautami, Srividya, Goundamani, Senthil, Manorama, Kovai Sarala
Radha Kadal Varadha	Deenadayal	Super Films	Yuvaraja	Mohan Kumar, Madhuri
Raja Chinna Roja	S. P. Muthuraman	AVM Productions	Chandrabose	Rajinikanth, Gautami, Ravichandran, S. S. Chandran, Kovai Sarala, Chinni Jayanth, Baby Shalini
Rajadhi Raja	R. Sundarrajan	Pavalar Creations	Ilaiyaraaja	Rajinikanth, Radha, Nadhiya, Janagaraj, Y. Vijaya
Rajanadai	S. A. Chandrasekhar	V. V. Creations	M. S. Viswanathan	Vijayakanth, Seetha, Gautami, Vidhyashree, S. S. Chandran, Kovai Sarala, Baby Shamili
Ramanujacharya	G. V. Iyer			
Rasathi Kalyanam	V. P. Sundar	K. M. R. Pictures	M. S. Viswanathan	Vetri, Yamuna
Rettai Kuzhal Thuppaki	M. Karnan	Vijaya Chithraa Cine Creations	Shankar–Ganesh	Karthik, Suganthi, Malathi, Radha Ravi, S. S. Chandran, Anuradha
Sakalakala Sambanthi	Visu	K. R. G. Movies International	Shankar–Ganesh	Visu, Saranya, Chandrasekhar, Aruna, Delhi Ganesh, Manorama, Pandiyan, Ranjini, Dhilip, Madhuri, Ilavarasan
Samsara Sangeetham	T. Rajendar	Chimbu Cine Arts	T. Rajendar	T. Rajendar, Renuka, Silambarasan
Samsarame Saranam	Jeevabalan	Sri Devi Bagavathi Films	Gangai Amaran	M. R. Yogaraj, Ranjini, Radha Ravi, Madhuri, Senthil, Vennira Aadai Moorthy, Manorama, Disco Shanti
Sandhya Raagam	Balu Mahendra	Doordarshan	L. Vaidyanathan	Archana, Chokkalinga Bagavathar, Veera Santhanam
Sangu Pushpangal	Anbukkani	Azhagapuram Amman Cine Arts	Guna Singh	Pandiyan, Vani Viswanath, Jeevitha, Senthil
Sariyana Jodi	Velu Prabhakaran	Film Makers International	Shyam	Pandiarajan, Ranjini, Jayadevi, Velu Prabhakaran, S. S. Chandran, Kovai Sarala
Sattathin Thirappu Vizhaa	M. Bhaskar	Oscar Movies	Shankar–Ganesh	Karthik, Shobana, Ravichandran, Sumithra, Vennira Aadai Moorthy, Kuyili
Siva	Ameerjan	Kavithalayaa Productions	Ilaiyaraaja	Rajinikanth, Raghuvaran, Shobana, Sowcar Janaki, Madhuri, Janagaraj, Disco Shanti, Charle
Shondham 16	T. S. Krishna Kumar	Sri Durga Films	Shankar–Ganesh	Mohan, Kalyani, Chandrasekhar, Manorama, S. S. Chandran, Senthil, Kovai Sarala, Disco Shanti, Lalitha Kumari
Solaikuyil	Rajan	Naachiar Movies	M. S. Murari	Karthik, Ragini Karthik, Radha Ravi, Pandiyan, S. S. Chandran, Kovai Sarala, Kuyili
Sonthakkaran	L. Raja	AVM Productions	Chandrabose	Arjun, Nirosha, Sarath Babu, S. S. Chandran, Kovai Sarala
Thaai Naadu	R. Aravindraj	Semba Movies	Manoj–Gyan	Sathyaraj, Radhika, M. N. Nambiar, Jaishankar, Srividya, Janagaraj
Thalaippu Seithigal	K. Madhu		Shyam	Pandiarajan, Chithra, Y. G. Mahendra
Thalaivanukkor Thalaivi	Vittal T. Gnanam	Balamurali Krishna Creations	M. Balamuralikrishna	Mohan, Rekha, Vaishnavi, Rajeev, Nizhalgal Ravi, Senthil
Thangamana Purushan	Rama Narayanan	Vijaya Vinayaga Arts	Shankar–Ganesh	S. Ve. Shekher, Rekha, S. S. Chandran, Manorama, Vennira Aadai Moorthy, Kovai Sarala, Chinni Jayanth
Thangamana Raasa	V. Azhagappan	Rekha Movies	Ilaiyaraaja	Ramarajan, Kanaka, Goundamani, Senthil, Vinu Chakravarthy, Gandhimathi, Rajeev, Ganga, Sudha
Thangamani Rangamani	Rama Narayanan	Sri Thenandal Films	Shankar–Ganesh	Murali, S. Ve. Shekher, Pallavi, Devi Sri, S. S. Chandran, Vennira Aadai Moorthy, Kovai Sarala, Gandhimathi, Charle
Thangachi Kalyanam	Prem	Lakshmi Jyothi Pictures		Vijay Menon, Poornima
Thaaya Thaarama	T. P. Gajendran	Amarajothi Movies	Shankar–Ganesh	S. Ve. Shekher, Rekha, K. R. Vijaya, Nizhalgal Ravi, Pandiyan, Anand Babu
Thendral Sudum	Manobala	G. B. Art Combines	Ilaiyaraaja	Nizhalgal Ravi, Radhika, Senthil
Thiruppu Munai	Kalaivanan Kannadasan	B. K. Enterprises	Ilaiyaraaja	Karthik, Chithra, Silk Smitha, Chandrasekhar, Sabitha Anand, Janagaraj
Unnai Naan Vazhthugiren	Venkatesh	Lakshmi Film Creations		Madhu Mohan, Kaveri
Uthama Purushan	K. Subash	Anandhi Films	Shankar–Ganesh	Prabhu, Revathi, Amala, V. K. Ramasamy, Kuyili, Charle
Vaathiyaar Veettu Pillai	P. Vasu	Raaj Films International	Ilaiyaraaja	Sathyaraj, Shobana, Srividya, Rajesh, Goundamani
Vaai Kozhuppu	Muktha Srinivasan	Muktha Films	Chandrabose	Pandiarajan, Gautami, Janagaraj, S. S. Chandran, Manorama, Disco Shanti
Valudhu Kalai Vaithu Vaa	K. Raghunathan	Future Cine Creations	Premi-Srini	Pandiyan, Chithra, K. R. Vijaya, Senthamarai, S. S. Chandran, Kovai Sarala
Varam	R. C. Sakthi	Lakshmi Sampoorna Movies	M. S. Viswanathan	Prabhu, Amala, Jayashree, Srividya
Varusham Padhinaaru	Fazil	Ganga Chithra Productions	Ilaiyaraaja	Karthik, Khushbu, Vadivukkarasi, Poornam Viswanathan, Jayabharathi, Janagaraj, V. K. Ramasamy, Sukumari, Charle
Vetrimel Vetri	M. Thyagarajan	Shiv Shri Pictures	Vijay Anand	Prabhu, Seetha, Goundamani
Vettaiyaadu Vilaiyaadu	L. Raja	Manthralaya Productions	Chandrabose	Arjun, Seetha, Nizhalgal Ravi, Charan Raj, Madhuri, Kovai Sarala, Baby Sujitha
Vettri Vizha	Pratap K. Pothen	Sivaji Productions	Ilaiyaraaja	Kamal Haasan, Prabhu, Amala, Khushbu, Sasikala, Sowcar Janaki, S. S. Chandran, Janagaraj, Disco Shanti
Vizhiyora Kavidhaigal	T. S. Chandrasekhar	Sri Sivalayaa Creations	Shankar–Ganesh	Manoj, Pallavi, Manorama, Senthil
Yogam Rajayogam	T. S. Krishna Kumar	Anbalaya Films	Shankar–Ganesh	Ramki, Seetha, S. Ve. Shekher
