= Sunanda (singer) =

Indian Singer

- Born: Kerala, India
- Occupation: Indian film playback singer
- Years active: 1984–1995

Sunanda is an Indian film playback singer, who predominantly works in Hindi cinema, Tamil cinema, and Malayalam cinema. She completed her pre-degree schooling in Kerala before moving to Chennai in 1983. She was trained in carnatic music. She was introduced to South Indian film music composer Ilaiyaraaja, who offered her the debut playback song for the movie Pudhumai Penn (1984 film). Nadeem - Shravan gave her the opportunity in bollywood and she rendered her voice for two of their films, Her Song "Jeetega Wohi Jisme Hai Dum" from the movie Sangraam and "Tumhein Dekhen Meri Aankhen" from the movie Rang are very popular..

== Career ==
Prior to her break in Tamil playback singing, she had sung Carnatic songs and slokas for a Malayalam documentary. Her debut film song was a hit, and she went on to sing multiple hit songs in Tamil and Malayalam movies in 1980s and 1990s. She was not able to continue active playback singing for many years for personal reasons.

== List of Tamil songs ==
Year	Film	Song	Music director	Co-Singer
1984	Pudhumai Penn	"Kathal Mayakam"	Ilaiyaraaja	P. Jayachandran
1985	Chinna Veedu	"Vellai Manam"	Ilaiyaraaja	Malaysia Vasudevan
1987	Enga Ooru Pattukaran	"Shenbagame"	Ilaiyaraaja	Mano
1987	Thangachi	"Marutha Jilla"	S. A. Rajkumar	S. P. Balasubrahmanyam
1987	Thangachi	"Mudhal Muraiye"	S. A. Rajkumar	S. P. Balasubrahmanyam
1987	Thangachi	"Ye Kuruvi Poongkuruvi"	S. A. Rajkumar	S. P. Balasubrahmanyam & S. P. Sailaja
1987	Thangachi	"Siraiyinil Seethai"	S. A. Rajkumar	S. P. Balasubrahmanyam
1988	Enga Ooru Kavakkaran	"Siruvani"	Ilaiyaraaja	Ilaiyaraaja & S. P. Sailaja
1988	Manasukkul Mathappu	"Poonthendrale"	S. A. Rajkumar	P. Jayachandran
1988	Puthiya Vaanam	"Mynaa Mynaa"	Hamsalekha	S. P. Balasubrahmanyam & S. P. Sailaja
1988	Solla Thudikuthu Manasu	"Poove Sempoove"	Ilaiyaraaja	
1988	Unnal Mudiyum Thambi	"Enna Samayalo"	Ilaiyaraaja	S. P. Balasubrahmanyam & K. S. Chithra
1989	En Purushanthaan Enakku Mattumthaan	"Poomudithu"	Ilaiyaraaja	P. Jayachandran
1989	En Thangai	"Vazhaiyum"	S. A. Rajkumar	
1989	Thiruppu Munai	"Adi Ye Pulla"	Ilaiyaraaja	Mano & K. S. Chithra
1989	Vetri Mel Vetri	"Indha Naal Nalla Naale"	Vijay Anand	S. P. Balasubrahmanyam & Vidya
1990	Adhisaya Manithan	"Manjal Azhaikkindrathe"	Premi–Srini	Mano
1990	Adhisaya Manithan	"Ulagame"	Premi–Srini	
1990	Adhisaya Manithan	"Avyaktho"	Premi–Srini	Sundarrajan
1990	Madurai Veeran Enga Saami	"Thangame"	Ilaiyaraaja	Arunmozhi
1990	Pachai Kodi	"Vaanam Bhoomi"	Gangai Amaran	
1990	Pudhu Padagan	"Kadhoram Kanagambaram"	Kalaipuli S. Thanu	S. P. Balasubrahmanyam
1990	Pudhu Pudhu Ragangal	"Summa Keluga"	S. A. Rajkumar	Dr. Vijayalakshmi Navaneethakrishnan
1991	Cheran Pandian	"Kodiyum Thoranamum"	Soundaryan	Malaysia Vasudevan
1991	Eeramana Rojave	"Adho Mega Oorvalam"	Ilaiyaraaja	Mano
1991	Manasara Vazhthungalen	"Ooraalum Sakthi"	S. A. Rajkumar	Malaysia Vasudevan
1991	Perum Pulli	"Mambala Thota"	S. A. Rajkumar	Malaysia Vasudevan
1991	Perum Pulli	"Manasum Manasum"	S. A. Rajkumar	S. P. Balasubrahmanyam
1991	Oyilattam	"Aathoram"	Deva	
1991	Vaidehi Kalyanam	"Kalyaanam Kalyaanam"	Deva	
1992	Unakkaga Piranthen	"Penn Venum"	Deva	S. P. Balasubrahmanyam
1993	Dharma Seelan	"Aiya Ithai Meiya"	Ilaiyaraaja	
1993	Kattalai	"Nambinen Maharajane"	Ilaiyaraaja	Mano
1993	Kizhakku Cheemayile	"Edhukku Pondatti"	A. R. Rahman	Shahul Hameed & T. K. Kala
1993	Maamiyar Veedu	"Theriyamal Matti"	Ilaiyaraaja	Mano, S. N. Surendar & Deepan Chakravarthy
1993	Moondravadhu Kann	"Malayalam Malayalam"	Deva	Malaysia Vasudevan
1993	Munarivippu	"Thottathellam"	Deva	
1993	Pon Vilangu	"Oru Kolakili"	Ilaiyaraaja	P. Jayachandran
1993	Pon Vilangu	"Koduthu Vacha"	Ilaiyaraaja	Malaysia Vasudevan
1993	Pon Vilangu	"Ooty Malai"	Ilaiyaraaja	Malaysia Vasudevan
1993	Thanga Pappa	"Naan Paadum Thalattu"	Deva	
1993	Thanga Pappa	"Aarararo Aariraaro"	Deva	
1993	Walter Vetrivel	"Mannava Mannava"	Ilaiyaraaja	
1993	Walter Vetrivel	"Poonkatre Inge Vanthu"	Ilaiyaraaja	Mano
1993	Uzhaippali	"Amma Amma"	Ilaiyaraaja	
1994	Magudikkaran	"Amma Paadiya"	Deva	
1994	Magudikkaran	"Pudhu Nagini"	Deva	
1994	Raasamahan	"Thuli Mani Thulie"	Ilaiyaraaja	
1994	Rajakumaran	"TRajakumara Rajakumara"	Ilaiyaraaja	Mano
1994	Sevvanthi	"Semmeene Semmeene"	Ilaiyaraaja	P. Jayachandran
1994	Thamarai	"Enge Then Thuli Iru Kaiyil Ottaamal"	Deva	Mano
1994	Veettai Paaru Naattai Paaru	"Rajani Ranjani"	Deva	
1994	Veetla Visheshanga	"Poonguyil Rendu"	Ilaiyaraaja	S. P. Balasubrahmanyam
1994	Kaadhalan	"Indiraiyo Ival Sundariyo"	A. R. Rahman	Minmini
1994	Humse Hai Muqabala	"Sagar Se Milne"	A. R. Rahman	Minmini
1995	Aanazhagan	"Poo Choodum"	Ilaiyaraaja	Uma Ramanan
1996	Enakkoru Magan Pirappan	"Aathu Mettulae"	Karthik Raja	P. Unnikrishnan
1996	Enakkoru Magan Pirappan	"En Raasi"	Karthik Raja	
1996	Mahaprabhu	"Sollava Sollava Oru Kadhal Kadhai"	Deva	S. P. Balasubrahmanyam
1996	Veettukulle Thiruvizha	"Rasa Unne Ravikkayin"	Deva	Swarnalatha & Krishnaraj
1996	Veettukulle Thiruvizha	"Pachaikallu Mookkuthi"	Deva	Malaysia Vasudevan
1997	Suryavamsam	"Natchathira Jannalil"	S. A. Rajkumar	Mano
1998	Pooveli	"Kathai Solla"	Bharadwaj	Karthik, Nizhalgal Ravi, Charle, Manorama & Bharadwaj
1999	Rajasthan	"Jil Jilara"	Ilaiyaraaja	Mano
1999	Thodarum	"Naanthaan"	Ilaiyaraaja	Arunmozhi, Gangai Amaran, Malaysia Vasudevan & Devie Neithiyar
2000	Kurukshetram	"Manadinile"	Mani Sharma	Ramu
2000	Thirunelveli	"Endha Paavi"	Ilaiyaraaja	
2001	Kaatrukkenna Veli	"Sri Gananatha Sindhoora"	Ilaiyaraaja	Uma Ramanan
2001	Kaatrukkenna Veli	"Theeradha Vilaiyattu Pillai"	Ilaiyaraaja	Uma Ramanan

== List of Hindi songs ==
Year	Film	Song	Music director	Co-Singer
1993	Sangraam	"Sajana Ban Ke Phiru"	Nadeem - Shravan	Alka Yagnik
1993	Sangraam	"Jeetega Wohi Jisme Hai Dum"	Nadeem - Shravan	Kumar Sanu
1993	Sangraam	"Tum Meri Mohabbat Ho"	Nadeem - Shravan	Kumar Sanu & Alka Yagnik
1993	Rang	"Tumhein Dekhen Meri Aankhen"	Nadeem - Shravan	Kumar Sanu & Alka Yagnik
1994	Humse Hai Muqabala	"Sagar Se Milne"	A. R. Rahman	Minmini
2009	Sanam Teri Kasam	"Sanam Yeh Pyar Hi To Hai"	Nadeem-Shravan	Kumar Sanu

== List of Telugu songs ==
Year	Film	Song	Music director	Co-Singer
1994	Kaadhalan (D)	"Alala Vale Vaana Varada Vale"	AR Rahman	Minmini
2010	Varudu	"Aidu Rojula Pelli"	Mani Sharma	K. Jamuna Rani, Hemachandra, Malavika, Vijayalakshmi & Ranjith
