= Manithan =

Manithan (transl. Human) may refer to the following Indian films:

- Manithan (1953 film), a 1953 Tamil film
- Manithan (1987 film), a 1987 Tamil film
- Manithan (2016 film), a 2016 Tamil film
- Manithan, a Tamil film series, consisting of
  - Naalai Manithan (1989)
  - Adhisaya Manithan (1990)
