= Vintage Film Awards =

Film Awards

- Awarded for: Best film and digital media productions from previous decades
- Country: Belgium
- First award: 2015
- Website: https://www.vintagefilmawards.com/

The Vintage Film Awards (VFA) are awards that recognize films released in previous decades with enduring popularity and continuing relevance in popular culture.

== History ==
The Vintage Film Awards was founded in 2015 by journalist James Rogers. The event takes place in Brussels, Belgium. Shortlisted films are chosen on account of their continued popularity, sales, and relevance in popular culture. Each year, shortlisted films are chosen from those officially released from 20, 30, 40 and 50 years prior. Final nominees and winners are determined by public opinion surveys.

== 1st Vintage Film Awards ==
The 1st Vintage Film Awards were presented in a ceremony held on May 11, 2016 at the Brussels Press Club. Awards were given to the best films and performances from 1995, 1985, 1975, and 1965.

=== Shortlists and nominees ===
Winners were announced May 11, 2016 in Brussels.

Year	Award	Shortlist	Nominated	Won
1995	Vintage Film of 1995 (V) Zeitgeist Film of 1995 (Z)	12 Monkeys		
1995	Vintage Film of 1995 (V) Zeitgeist Film of 1995 (Z)	Apollo 13		
1995	Vintage Film of 1995 (V) Zeitgeist Film of 1995 (Z)	Before Sunrise	Nominated	
1995	Vintage Film of 1995 (V) Zeitgeist Film of 1995 (Z)	Clueless	Nominated	
1995	Vintage Film of 1995 (V) Zeitgeist Film of 1995 (Z)	Mr. Holland's Opus		
1995	Vintage Film of 1995 (V) Zeitgeist Film of 1995 (Z)	Sense and Sensibility	Nominated	
1995	Vintage Film of 1995 (V) Zeitgeist Film of 1995 (Z)	Seven	Nominated	V
1995	Vintage Film of 1995 (V) Zeitgeist Film of 1995 (Z)	To Die For		
1995	Vintage Film of 1995 (V) Zeitgeist Film of 1995 (Z)	The Usual Suspects		
1995	Vintage Film of 1995 (V) Zeitgeist Film of 1995 (Z)	While You Were Sleeping	Nominated	Z
1995	Vintage Performance by an Actor	Ethan Hawke (as Jesse in Before Sunrise)	Nominated	
1995	Vintage Performance by an Actor	Bill Pullman (as Jack in While You Were Sleeping)	Nominated	
1995	Vintage Performance by an Actor	Paul Rudd (as Josh in Clueless)	Nominated	
1995	Vintage Performance by an Actor	Alan Rickman (as Brandon in Sense and Sensibility)	Nominated	
1995	Vintage Performance by an Actor	Morgan Freeman (as Det. Somerset in Seven)	Nominated	Won
1995	Vintage Performance by an Actress	Alicia Silverstone (as Cher Horowitz in Clueless)	Nominated	Won
1995	Vintage Performance by an Actress	Emma Thompson (as Elinor in Sense and Sensibility)	Nominated	
1995	Vintage Performance by an Actress	Julie Delpy (as Céline in Before Sunrise)	Nominated	
1995	Vintage Performance by an Actress	Nicole Kidman (as Suzanne Stone in To Die For)	Nominated	
1995	Vintage Performance by an Actress	Sandra Bullock (as Lucy in While You Were Sleeping)	Nominated	
1995	Vintage Soundtrack	Winner: “Gangsta’s Paradise” from “Dangerous Minds” by Coolio		
1985	Vintage Film of 1995 (V) Zeitgeist Film of 1995 (Z)	Back to the Future	Nominated	V
1985	Vintage Film of 1995 (V) Zeitgeist Film of 1995 (Z)	Better Off Dead		
1985	Vintage Film of 1995 (V) Zeitgeist Film of 1995 (Z)	Brazil (film)		
1985	Vintage Film of 1995 (V) Zeitgeist Film of 1995 (Z)	The Breakfast Club	Nominated	
1985	Vintage Film of 1995 (V) Zeitgeist Film of 1995 (Z)	The Color Purple	Nominated	
1985	Vintage Film of 1995 (V) Zeitgeist Film of 1995 (Z)	Fright Night		
1985	Vintage Film of 1995 (V) Zeitgeist Film of 1995 (Z)	The Goonies	Nominated	
1985	Vintage Film of 1995 (V) Zeitgeist Film of 1995 (Z)	Mask (film)		
1985	Vintage Film of 1995 (V) Zeitgeist Film of 1995 (Z)	St. Elmo’s Fire	Nominated	Z
1985	Vintage Film of 1995 (V) Zeitgeist Film of 1995 (Z)	Witness (film)		
1985	Vintage Performance by an Actor	Danny Glover (as Albert in The Color Purple)	Nominated	
1985	Vintage Performance by an Actor	Sean Astin (as Mikey in The Goonies)	Nominated	
1985	Vintage Performance by an Actor	Judd Nelson (as Bender in The Breakfast Club)	Nominated	
1985	Vintage Performance by an Actor	Michael J. Fox (as Marty McFly in Back to the Future)	Nominated	Won
1985	Vintage Performance by an Actor	Rob Lowe (as Billy Hicks in St. Elmo's Fire)	Nominated	
1985	Vintage Performance by an Actress	Demi Moore (as Jules in St. Elmo's Fire)	Nominated	
1985	Vintage Performance by an Actress	Lea Thompson (as Lorraine in Back to the Future)	Nominated	
1985	Vintage Performance by an Actress	Kerri Green (as Andy in The Goonies)	Nominated	
1985	Vintage Performance by an Actress	Molly Ringwald (as Claire in The Breakfast Club)	Nominated	
1985	Vintage Performance by an Actress	Whoopi Goldberg (as Celie in The Color Purple)	Nominated	Won
1985	Vintage Soundtrack	Winner: “Don't You (Forget About Me)” from The Breakfast Club by Simple Minds		
1975	Vintage Film of 1975 (V); Zeitgeist Film of 1975 (Z)	Dog Day Afternoon	Nominated	
1975	Vintage Film of 1975 (V); Zeitgeist Film of 1975 (Z)	Jaws	Nominated	V
1975	Vintage Film of 1975 (V); Zeitgeist Film of 1975 (Z)	Jeanne Dielman, 23 quai du Commerce		
1975	Vintage Film of 1975 (V); Zeitgeist Film of 1975 (Z)	Monty Python and the Holy Grail	Nominated	
1975	Vintage Film of 1975 (V); Zeitgeist Film of 1975 (Z)	One Flew Over the Cuckoo’s Nest	Nominated	
1975	Vintage Film of 1975 (V); Zeitgeist Film of 1975 (Z)	Operation Daybreak		
1975	Vintage Film of 1975 (V); Zeitgeist Film of 1975 (Z)	The Return of the Pink Panther		
1975	Vintage Film of 1975 (V); Zeitgeist Film of 1975 (Z)	The Rocky Horror Picture Show	Nominated	Z
1975	Vintage Film of 1975 (V); Zeitgeist Film of 1975 (Z)	The Stepford Wives		
1975	Vintage Film of 1975 (V); Zeitgeist Film of 1975 (Z)	The Wind and the Lion		
1975	Vintage Performance by an Actor	Al Pacino (as Sonny in Dog Day Afternoon)	Nominated	
1975	Vintage Performance by an Actor	Graham Chapman (as Arthur in Monty Python and the Holy Grail)	Nominated	
1975	Vintage Performance by an Actor	Jack Nicholson (as Randle McMurphy in One Flew Over the Cuckoo’s Nest)	Nominated	Won
1975	Vintage Performance by an Actor	Robert Shaw (as Quint in Jaws)	Nominated	
1975	Vintage Performance by an Actor	Tim Curry (as Frank N. Furter in The Rocky Horror Picture Show)	Nominated	
1975	Vintage Performance by an Actress	Candice Bergen (as Eden in The Wind and the Lion)	Nominated	
1975	Vintage Performance by an Actress	Delphine Seyrig (as Jeanne Dielman in Jeanne Dielman, 23, Quai du Commerce, 1080 Bruxelles)	Nominated	
1975	Vintage Performance by an Actress	Katharine Ross (as Joanna in The Stepford Wives)	Nominated	
1975	Vintage Performance by an Actress	Louise Fletcher (as Nurse Ratched in One Flew Over the Cuckoo’s Nest)	Nominated	
1975	Vintage Performance by an Actress	Susan Sarandon (as Janet Weiss in The Rocky Horror Picture Show)	Nominated	Won
1975	Vintage Soundtrack	“The Time Warp” from “The Rocky Horror Picture Show” by Richard O’Brien, Nell Campbell, and Patricia Quinn		
1965	Vintage Film of 1965 (V) Zeitgeist Film of 1965 (Z)	A Thousand Clowns		
1965	Vintage Film of 1965 (V) Zeitgeist Film of 1965 (Z)	The Agony and the Ecstasy		
1965	Vintage Film of 1965 (V) Zeitgeist Film of 1965 (Z)	Cat Ballou	Nominated	Z
1965	Vintage Film of 1965 (V) Zeitgeist Film of 1965 (Z)	Doctor Zhivago	Nominated	
1965	Vintage Film of 1965 (V) Zeitgeist Film of 1965 (Z)	For a Few Dollars More	Nominated	
1965	Vintage Film of 1965 (V) Zeitgeist Film of 1965 (Z)	The Great Race		
1965	Vintage Film of 1965 (V) Zeitgeist Film of 1965 (Z)	Shenandoah		
1965	Vintage Film of 1965 (V) Zeitgeist Film of 1965 (Z)	The Shop on Main Street (Obchod na korze)		
1965	Vintage Film of 1965 (V) Zeitgeist Film of 1965 (Z)	The Sons of Katie Elder	Nominated	
1965	Vintage Film of 1965 (V) Zeitgeist Film of 1965 (Z)	Thunderball	Nominated	V

== 2nd Vintage Film Awards ==
The 2nd Vintage Film Awards took place on May 5, 2017. Awards were given to the best films and performances from 1996, 1986, 1976, and 1966.

=== Shortlists and nominees ===
Year	Award	Shortlist	Nominated	Won
1996	Vintage Film of 1996 (V) Zeitgeist Film of 1996 (Z)	Bound		
1996	Vintage Film of 1996 (V) Zeitgeist Film of 1996 (Z)	Emma		
1996	Vintage Film of 1996 (V) Zeitgeist Film of 1996 (Z)	Fargo	Y	
1996	Vintage Film of 1996 (V) Zeitgeist Film of 1996 (Z)	Jerry Maguire	Y	V
1996	Vintage Film of 1996 (V) Zeitgeist Film of 1996 (Z)	Scream	Y	
1996	Vintage Film of 1996 (V) Zeitgeist Film of 1996 (Z)	Set It Off		
1996	Vintage Film of 1996 (V) Zeitgeist Film of 1996 (Z)	Shall We Dance?		
1996	Vintage Film of 1996 (V) Zeitgeist Film of 1996 (Z)	Sling Blade	Y	
1996	Vintage Film of 1996 (V) Zeitgeist Film of 1996 (Z)	Swingers	Y	Z
1996	Vintage Film of 1996 (V) Zeitgeist Film of 1996 (Z)	Trainspotting		
1996	Vintage Performance by an Actor	Billy Bob Thornton (in Sling Blade)	Y	
1996	Vintage Performance by an Actor	Ewan McGregor (in Trainspotting)	Y	
1996	Vintage Performance by an Actor	Jeremy Northam (in Emma)	Y	
1996	Vintage Performance by an Actor	Steve Buscemi (in Fargo)	Y	
1996	Vintage Performance by an Actor	Tom Cruise (in Jerry Maguire)	Y	Y
1996	Vintage Performance by an Actor	Vince Vaughn (in Swingers)	Y	
1996	Vintage Performance by an Actress	Frances McDormand (in Fargo)	Y	
1996	Vintage Performance by an Actress	Gwyneth Paltrow (in Emma (film))	Y	
1996	Vintage Performance by an Actress	Neve Campbell (in Scream)	Y	
1996	Vintage Performance by an Actress	Queen Latifah (in Set It Off)	Y	
1996	Vintage Performance by an Actress	Renée Zellweger (in Jerry Maguire)	Y	
1996	Vintage Performance by an Actress	Sandra Bullock (in A Time to Kill)	Y	Y
1996	Vintage Soundtrack	The Cardigans: "Lovefool" from Romeo and Juliet	Y	
1996	Vintage Soundtrack	Garbage (band) "#1 Crush" from Romeo and Juliet	Y	
1996	Vintage Soundtrack	Madonna: "Don't Cry for me Argentina" from Evita	Y	
1996	Vintage Soundtrack	R. Kelly:"I Believe I can Fly" from Space Jam	Y	Y
1996	Vintage Soundtrack	Underworld (band):"Born Slippy .NUXX" from Trainspotting	Y	
1986	Vintage Film of 1986 (V) Zeitgeist Film of 1986 (Z)	Aliens (film)	Y	
1986	Vintage Film of 1986 (V) Zeitgeist Film of 1986 (Z)	Blue Velvet		
1986	Vintage Film of 1986 (V) Zeitgeist Film of 1986 (Z)	Ferris Bueller's Day Off	Y	Z
1986	Vintage Film of 1986 (V) Zeitgeist Film of 1986 (Z)	Hoosiers		
1986	Vintage Film of 1986 (V) Zeitgeist Film of 1986 (Z)	Jean de Florette		
1986	Vintage Film of 1986 (V) Zeitgeist Film of 1986 (Z)	Little Shop of Horrors		
1986	Vintage Film of 1986 (V) Zeitgeist Film of 1986 (Z)	Platoon		
1986	Vintage Film of 1986 (V) Zeitgeist Film of 1986 (Z)	Pretty in Pink	Y	
1986	Vintage Film of 1986 (V) Zeitgeist Film of 1986 (Z)	Stand by Me	Y	
1986	Vintage Film of 1986 (V) Zeitgeist Film of 1986 (Z)	Top Gun	Y	V
1986	Vintage Performance by an Actor	Charlie Sheen (in Platoon)	Y	
1986	Vintage Performance by an Actor	Gary Oldman (in Sid and Nancy)	Y	
1986	Vintage Performance by an Actor	Kyle MacLachlan (in Blue Velvet)	Y	
1986	Vintage Performance by an Actor	Matthew Broderick (in Ferris Bueller's Day Off)	Y	Y
1986	Vintage Performance by an Actor	Rob Lowe (in About Last Night)	Y	
1986	Vintage Performance by an Actor	Tom Cruise (in Top Gun)	Y	Y
1986	Vintage Performance by an Actress	Dianne Wiest (in Hannah and Her Sisters)	Y	
1986	Vintage Performance by an Actress	Isabella Rossellini (in Blue Velvet)	Y	
1986	Vintage Performance by an Actress	Kelly McGillis (in Top Gun)	Y	
1986	Vintage Performance by an Actress	Kim Basinger (in 9½ Weeks)	Y	
1986	Vintage Performance by an Actress	Molly Ringwald (in Pretty in Pink)	Y	
1986	Vintage Performance by an Actress	Sigourney Weaver (in Aliens)	Y	Y
1986	Vintage Soundtrack	Berlin: "Take My Breath Away" from Top Gun	Y	
1986	Vintage Soundtrack	Kenny Loggins: "Danger Zone" from Top Gun	Y	
1986	Vintage Soundtrack	Lionel Richie: "Say You, Say Me" from White Nights	Y	
1986	Vintage Soundtrack	Michael McDonald: "Sweet Freedom" from Running Scared	Y	
1986	Vintage Soundtrack	Orchestral Manoeuvres in the Dark: "If You Leave" from Pretty in Pink	Y	
1976	Vintage Film of 1976 (V); Zeitgeist Film of 1976 (Z)	All the President's Men	Y	
1976	Vintage Film of 1976 (V); Zeitgeist Film of 1976 (Z)	Carrie	Y	
1976	Vintage Film of 1976 (V); Zeitgeist Film of 1976 (Z)	Logan's Run		
1976	Vintage Film of 1976 (V); Zeitgeist Film of 1976 (Z)	Murder by Death		
1976	Vintage Film of 1976 (V); Zeitgeist Film of 1976 (Z)	Network (film)		
1976	Vintage Film of 1976 (V); Zeitgeist Film of 1976 (Z)	Rocky	Y	V
1976	Vintage Film of 1976 (V); Zeitgeist Film of 1976 (Z)	Taxi Driver	Y	Z
1976	Vintage Film of 1976 (V); Zeitgeist Film of 1976 (Z)	The Omen		
1976	Vintage Film of 1976 (V); Zeitgeist Film of 1976 (Z)	The Shootist		
1976	Vintage Performance by an Actor	Clint Eastwood in The Outlaw Josey Wales	Y	
1976	Vintage Performance by an Actor	Dustin Hoffman (in Marathon Man)	Y	
1976	Vintage Performance by an Actor	Sylvester Stallone (in Rocky)	Y	Y
1976	Vintage Performance by an Actor	Gene Wilder (in Silver Streak)	Y	
1976	Vintage Performance by an Actor	Robert De Niro (in Taxi Driver)	Y	
1976	Vintage Performance by an Actress	Barbara Harris (in Family Plot)	Y	
1976	Vintage Performance by an Actress	Barbra Streisand (in A Star Is Born)	Y	
1976	Vintage Performance by an Actress	Faye Dunaway (in Network (film))	Y	
1976	Vintage Performance by an Actress	Jenny Agutter (in Logan's Run)	Y	
1976	Vintage Performance by an Actress	Jodie Foster (in Taxi Driver)	Y	
1976	Vintage Performance by an Actress	Lee Remick (in The Omen)	Y	
1976	Vintage Performance by an Actress	Sissy Spacek (in Carrie (film))	Y	
1976	Vintage Soundtrack	Aretha Franklin: "Something He Can Feel" from Sparkle	Y	
1976	Vintage Soundtrack	Barbra Streisand: "Evergreen" from A Star Is Born	Y	
1976	Vintage Soundtrack	Bill Conti: "Gonna Fly Now" from Rocky	Y	
1976	Vintage Soundtrack	Rose Royce: "Car Wash" from Car Wash	Y	Y
1966	Vintage Film of 1966 (V) Zeitgeist Film of 1966 (Z)	A Man for All Seasons		
1966	Vintage Film of 1966 (V) Zeitgeist Film of 1966 (Z)	Alfie		
1966	Vintage Film of 1966 (V) Zeitgeist Film of 1966 (Z)	Andrei Rublev		
1966	Vintage Film of 1966 (V) Zeitgeist Film of 1966 (Z)	Blowup		
1966	Vintage Film of 1966 (V) Zeitgeist Film of 1966 (Z)	Fahrenheit 451	Y	
1966	Vintage Film of 1966 (V) Zeitgeist Film of 1966 (Z)	How to Steal a Million	Y	Z
1966	Vintage Film of 1966 (V) Zeitgeist Film of 1966 (Z)	Persona		
1966	Vintage Film of 1966 (V) Zeitgeist Film of 1966 (Z)	The Battle of Algiers		
1966	Vintage Film of 1966 (V) Zeitgeist Film of 1966 (Z)	The Good, the Bad and the Ugly	Y	V
1966	Vintage Film of 1966 (V) Zeitgeist Film of 1966 (Z)	Who's Afraid of Virginia Woolf?	Y	

== See also ==
- Classical Hollywood cinema
