= Satrumun Kidaitha Thagaval =

Satrumun Kidaitha Thagaival
- Poster
- Directed by: Bhuvanai Kannan
- Produced by: Hari Bhaskar S.
- Starring: Kanal Kannan; Bharathi; Khushbu; Livingston; K. S. Ravikumar
- Cinematography: A. L. Narayana Raman
- Edited by: Don Max
- Music by: Bala
- Production company: Air Media Technologies
- Release date: 30 January 2009
- Country: India
- Language: Tamil

Satrumun Kidaitha Thagaval (transl. Information received a while back) is a 2009 Indian Tamil-language thriller film directed by Bhuvanai Kannan. The film stars Kanal Kannan, Bharathi, Khushbu, Livingston, and K. S. Ravikumar. The film was released on 30 January 2009.

== Plot ==
A sequence of murder takes place in the city and a cop steps in to investigate them. Meanwhile, Shiva leaves a mental asylum. It is concluded that a lunatic is behind all these murders. Siva (Kanal Kannan) manages to enter the house of a film director (Livingston). His wife is all alone. She suspects him to be the mentally-challenged man on murder trail. Meanwhile, the police zeroes in on a psychiatrist doctor (Khushbu) to be responsible for the murder. In the court, she spills the beans that a young girl who had a disturbed childhood was indeed responsible for the deaths, she is shown to have been molested by a police officer, her first adoptive father. Shiva eventually discovers that it was none other than the film director's wife. What the noble-hearted Shiva does to bring her back to normal life forms the rest.

== Cast ==
- Kanal Kannan as Siva
- Bharathi as Meera
- Khushbu as Radha
- Livingston
- K. S. Ravikumar
- Sriman
- Kausalya
- Karunas
- Sethu
- Meenakshi
- Shathiga
- Babilona
- Roshika
- T. P. Gajendran
- Ajay Rathnam
- Mohan V. Raman
- Naren
- Nambiraj
- Natesh
- Siddharth
- Kadhal Arun Kumar

== Production ==
The film marked the debut of Kanal Kannan as lead actor. Thakkali Srinivasan was initially chosen to be the director but was replaced midway through production by a debutant director, Bhuvanai Kannan.

== Soundtrack ==
Soundtrack was composed by newcomer Bala.

- "Sei Sei" – Karthik, Madhumitha
- "Pichavaram" – Tippu
- "Konjam" – Harish Raghavendra, Chinmayi
- "Rojavanam" – Anuradha Sriram

== Critical reception ==
Malathi Rangarajan of The Hindu wrote, "The script lacks cohesion and many questions remain unanswered. Every main character has a past and the director’s bid to weave them into the story results in utter confusion."
