= Oduvil Kittiya Vartha =

Oduvil Kiitiya Vartha
- Directed by: Yatheendra Das
- Written by: Vindhyan; S. L. Puram Sadanandan (dialogues)
- Screenplay by: S. L. Puram Sadanandan
- Produced by: Vindhyan
- Starring: Mammootty; Nedumudi Venu; Chithra; Jalaja
- Cinematography: Vipin Mohan
- Edited by: B Satheesh
- Production company: Bhadra
- Distributed by: Bhadra
- Release date: 22 March 1985
- Country: India
- Language: Malayalam

Oduvil Kiitiya Vartha is a 1985 Indian Malayalam film, directed by Yatheendra Das and produced by Vindhyan. The film stars Mammootty, Nedumudi Venu, Chithra and Jalaja in lead roles.

== Cast ==
- Mammootty
- Nedumudi Venu
- Chithra
- Jalaja
- Sukumari
- Jagathy Sreekumar
- Thilakan
- KPAC Lalitha
- Latheef
- Balan Kattoor
- TG Ravi
