= Dark Giant =

2026 Indian Tamil-language horror thriller film

- Film poster
- Directed by: K. S. Kishaan
- Written by: K. S. Kishaan
- Produced by: Logesvaran N
- Starring: Sonia Agarwal; K. Bhagyaraj; Madhan Kumar Dhakshinamoorthy
- Cinematography: Sangeeth Manigopal
- Edited by: G. J. Thiruselvam
- Music by: Vignesh Raja
- Production company: Biovan Creationism
- Distributed by: Uthraa Productions
- Release date: 19 June 2026
- Country: India
- Language: Tamil

Dark Giant is a 2026 Indian Tamil-language horror thriller film written and directed by K. S. Kishaan. The film is produced by Logesvaran N under the banner of Biovan Creationism and distributed by Uthraa Productions. It stars Sonia Agarwal, K. Bhagyaraj and Madhan Kumar Dhakshinamoorthy in pivotal roles. The film was released on 19 June 2026.

== Cast ==
- Sonia Agarwal
- K. Bhagyaraj
- Livingston
- Madhan Kumar Dhakshinamoorthy
- Jovita Livingston
- Amudha Vanan
- Rafiq Batcha
- Adharsh Mathikanth

== Production ==
The film was produced by Logesvaran N under the production banner Biovan Creationism. Principal photography was filmed in Tamil Nadu. The cinematography was handled by Sangeeth Manigopal, while editing was carried out by G. J. Thiruselvam. The film's music was composed by Vignesh Raja.

== Reception ==
Dina Thanthi gave the film a positive review, appreciating the intermission and climax scenes. Maalai Malar wrote that although the storytelling was confusing at times, the horror scenes and technical quality somewhat mad up for those shortcomings. Dinamalar wrote that Sangeeth Manigopal's cinematography and Vignesh Raja's music gave some strength to the story but criticised the slow-paced screenplay, the lack of a true horror/thriller experience, and the fact that Bhagyaraj and Livingston were underutilised.
