= Aduthathu =

2011 Indian film by Thakkali Srinivasan

- Theatrical poster
- Directed by: Thakkali Srinivasan
- Screenplay by: Thakkali Srinivasan; R. Narayanan (dialogues)
- Based on: And Then There Were None by Agatha Christie
- Starring: Nassar; Sriman; Vaiyapuri; Aarthi; Ilavarasu; Meenal; Darshini
- Cinematography: Ezhil
- Edited by: Maha Vishnu
- Music by: Peter Balaji
- Production company: Sutradhar
- Distributed by: Keyaar
- Release date: 20 April 2012
- Running time: 103 minutes
- Country: India
- Language: Tamil

Aduthathu (transl. Next) is a 2012 Indian Tamil-language thriller film directed by Thakkali Srinivasan. The film stars Nassar, Sriman, Vaiyapuri, Ilavarasu, Aarthi and Meenal. The film is based on Agatha Christie's mystery novel And Then There Were None. It was released on 20 April 2012, having been delayed from 23 September 2011.

== Cast ==
- Nassar as Krishnamoorthy, a retired judge
- Sriman as Prathap
- Vaiyapuri as Baskhar, a cook
- Ilavarasu as Dr. Mohan Ram, a neurologist
- Aarthi as Selvi, a village woman
- Meenal as Varsha, a model
- Darshini as Pavitra, an MBA graduate
- R. S. Shivaji as a reporter
- Vivek Anand as Angels, a journalist
- Chandru as Sandeep, a computer engineer
- Aruna as Sarika, a businesswoman
- Sundari as Indira, a public prosecutor
- VJ Sabarna as an anchor

== Reception ==
M Suganth of The Times of India wrote, "Despite having the premise for a perfect B-horror movie, Aduthathu fails to thrill".

== Controversy ==
There was a controversy that the 2015 Kannada film Aatagara is the remake of the film. At this point of time, the team of Aatagara arranged a special screening of the film for Thakkali Srinivasan in Bangalore. Srinivasan clarified that it is not a remake of his film. He also praised Aatagara of being an extremely well-made film. Srinivasan added that he had made a serial inspired from Agatha Christe's novel And Then There Were None in 1995. Later he made the film Aduthathu inspired by the same. For both these, Kannan Parameshwaran worked on the story. Kannan also wrote the story and co-wrote the screenplay for Aatagara inspired by the same novel. Srinivasan had said that anything similar was to the novel and not his film.
