= Thakkali Srinivasan =

Indian film director, musician and producer (1953/1954–2026)

- Born: 1953 or 1954
- Died: 10 March 2026 (aged 72); Bengaluru, Karnataka, India
- Occupation: Director
- Years active: 1991–2026

Thakkali Srinivasan (1953 or 1954 – 10 March 2026) was an Indian film director, musician and producer who worked on Tamil films, often involving horror or murder mystery plotlines. After his last film in 2012, he shifted to philanthropy.

== Life and career ==
Thakkali Srinivasan began his career as a producer and made the science fiction film Nalaya Manithan (1989) directed by Velu Prabhakaran. The success of the film prompted him to produce a sequel titled Adhisaya Manithan (1990) with a different cast, and the project did not perform as well commercially. He had also composed music for the films, along with Premi, forming the Premi–Srini duo largely supported by another music composer Manachanallur Giridharan. Subsequently, he directed two films in the 1990s, the horror film Jenma Natchathram (1991) with Nassar and the murder mystery film, Witness (1995) with Raghuvaran in the lead role. He began work on the production of a Pandiarajan-starrer titled Maaruvedam in the late 1990s, but the film was later shelved.

In 2001, he made Asokavanam, another murder mystery film featuring Livingston, Sriman and Riyaz Khan and won mixed reviews for his work. A critic from The Hindu noted that "the script is good in the first half but sags in the second". He later began working on a film titled Satrumun Kidaitha Thagaval (2009) featuring Kanal Kannan, but was replaced midway through production by a debutant director, Bhuvanai Kannan. His last release was Aduthathu (2012), a thriller about reality show contestants on a desert island, starring Sriman in the lead role.

In his final years, Srinivasan abstained from films in favour of philanthropy, and was running an ashram. He died in Bengaluru on 10 March 2026, at the age of 72.

== Filmography ==
Year	Film	Credited as					Role
Year	Film	Director	Writer	Producer	Music	Actor	Role
1987	Ivargal Varungala Thoongal		Yes				
1988	Manasukkul Mathappu		Yes				
1988	Soora Samhaaram					Yes	Kitty's son
1989	Nalaya Manithan		Yes	Yes	Yes	Dr. Kanth	
1989	Valathu Kalai Vaithu Vaa				Yes		
1990	Adhisaya Manithan		Yes	Yes	Yes		
1991	Jenma Natchathram	Yes	Screenplay		Yes	Yes	Lawrence
1995	Witness	Yes	Yes		Yes	Yes	Srinivasan
1995	Puthiya Aatchi				Yes		
2001	Asokavanam	Yes	Yes				
2012	Aduthathu	Yes	Screenplay				
