= Sorry Enaku Kalyanamayidichu =

- Directed by: Sagar
- Screenplay by: Sagar
- Produced by: GV
- Starring: Sriman; Swarnamalya; Flora Saini
- Cinematography: Ashok R. H.
- Edited by: Sedrik
- Music by: Siva-Dominic
- Production company: 99% Entertainers
- Release date: 23 December 2005
- Country: India
- Language: Tamil

Sorry Enaku Kalyanamayidichu (transl. Sorry, I am married) is a 2005 Indian Tamil-language film directed by Sagar. It stars Sriman (in his lead debut), Swarnamalya and Flora Saini. It is a remake of the 2004 Telugu film Sorry Naaku Pellaindi.

== Cast ==
- Sriman as Ashok
- Swarnamalya as Aparna
- Flora Saini as Manju
- M. S. Bhaskar as Azhagusundaram
- Chinni Jayanth as Raghu
- Chitti Babu as Murali
- Pandu as Narayanan
- Livingston as Appu
- Kunal as Vijay
- Manobala
- K. Rajan
- Muthukaalai as Pandi
- Shakeela as Baby
- Priyanka

== Controversy ==
The film was initially denied a censor certificate by the regional censor board in Chennai and was referred to the revising committee in Mumbai before it was released.
