= Namma Veetu Kalyanam =

- DVD cover
- Directed by: V. Sekhar
- Written by: V. Sekhar
- Produced by: K. Paarthiban
- Starring: Murali; Meena; Vivek; Vindhya; Vadivelu; Livingston
- Cinematography: P. S. Selvam, R. Mahendran
- Edited by: A .P. Manivannan
- Music by: S. A. Rajkumar
- Production company: Thiruvalluvar Kalaikoodam
- Release date: 20 September 2002
- Running time: 158 minutes
- Country: India
- Language: Tamil

Namma Veetu Kalyanam (transl. Our Family Marriage) is a 2002 Indian Tamil-language comedy drama film written and directed by V. Sekhar. The film stars Murali in the main lead role alongside Vadivelu and Vivek. Meena, Vindhya, Rajeev, Livingston and Manorama play supporting roles. The film was released on 20 September 2002 to mixed reviews from critics and was a commercial success.

== Plot ==
Ravi and Gopi are two graduates who come to Chennai in search of jobs. They stay in Sengalvarayan`s house, which is owned by Manickam, an auto driver. Manickam`s wife has two rich sisters Meena and Geetha. Their brother Krishnamurthy is an MLA. They give Rs.1.5 lakhs to a politician and wait for a job in a college. The two sisters who had rejected a number of proposals earlier fall in love with Ravi and Gopi as Sengalvarayan convinces them that both of them are professors in college. Krishnamurthy's plans to get his sisters married to the two sons of the education minister go awry. But finally Krishnamurthy agrees to his sisters` suitors. But after the wedding, Krishnamurthy and the girls are shocked to know that Ravi and Gopi are unemployed. The girls refuse to go with their husbands and the problems begin. How the two takes a vow to win back their wives forms the rest of the story.

== Cast ==
- Murali as Ravi
- Meena as Meena
- Vindhya as Geetha
- Vadivelu as Sengalvarayan
- Vivek as Gopi
- Livingston as Manickam
- Rajeev as MLA Krishnamurthy
- Manorama
- Sonia
- Sindhu as Manickam's wife
- Pyramid Natarajan as Minister Ponvannan
- Anu Mohan as Divisional Secretary
- Ajay Rathnam as Police Officer
- Madhan Bob as College Principal
- R. Sundarrajan
- Kumarimuthu
- Pandu
- Ammu
- Chandrasekhar as Police Commissioner (Guest appearance)

== Soundtrack ==
Soundtrack was composed by S. A. Rajkumar. The song "Othuda Othuda" is loosely based on Hindi song "Oh Mungda" from Hindi film Inkaar.

Song	Singers	Lyrics
"Andha Vaanam Vittu"	Srinivas, Swarnalatha	Pa. Vijay
"Ennadi Gnana Penne"	Mano	Arivumathi
"Minnuthu Minnuthu"	K. S. Chithra, S. P. Balasubrahmanyam	Thamarai
"Naatu Sakkara"	Mano	Palani Bharathi
"Othuda Othuda"	Karthik	Kalaikumar

== Reception ==
Chennai Online wrote "[..] V. Sekar seems to have exhausted all his issues, his recent films have been a hotchpotch of incidents and characters, neither message-oriented nor entertaining". Sify wrote "V. Sekhar?s storytelling technique and the technical aspects of the film are archaic. The problem with this film is that Murali and Vivek looks too old to be graduates out of college looking out for jobs! As for Meena she has not only aged but is willing to do any role opposite some hero. Is she that desperate? Vadivelu is too loud and S.A.Rajkumar?s music is repetitive. The only saving grace is Vivek and his one-liners".
