= Ivargal Varungala Thoongal =

- Theatrical release poster
- Directed by: Venkat
- Written by: Venkat
- Produced by: Thakkali Srinivasan
- Starring: Prabhu; Ambika
- Cinematography: P. N. Sundaram
- Edited by: T. Thirunavukkarasu
- Music by: T. Rajendar
- Production company: Perfect Productions
- Release date: 21 October 1987
- Country: India
- Language: Tamil

Ivargal Varungala Thoongal (transl. They are the pillars of the future) is a 1987 Indian Tamil-language film written and directed by Venkat, and produced by Thakkali Srinivasan. The film stars Prabhu and Ambika. It was released on 21 October 1987.

== Cast ==
- Prabhu
- Ambika
- Raghuvaran
- Jaishankar
- Jayachitra
- Ravichandran
- Nagesh
- Disco Shanti

== Production ==
Ivargal Varungala Thoongal is Prabhu's 50th film as an actor. The film spoke about drug addiction among college students due to which their lives get ruined.

== Soundtrack ==
The soundtrack was composed by T. Rajendar, who also wrote the lyrics.

Track listing
No.	Title	Singer(s)	Length
1.	"Thalaivar Cheettu Naarkalikku"	Mano	4:37
2.	"Vanjiyidam Nenjamadhai"	S. P. Balasubrahmanyam	4:28
3.	"Jaathimalli Poothirukku"	Malaysia Vasudevan	5:04
4.	"Manjal Nila Kaayudhu"	S. P. Balasubrahmanyam, Uma Ramanan	4:38
5.	"Varungaala Thoongale"	Malaysia Vasudevan	4:44
6.	"Mattrum Thurandha Munivan Yaaru?"	K. S. Chithra	4:18
Total length:			27:49

== Critical reception ==
Ivargal Varungala Thoongal was released on 21 October 1987, during Diwali. N. Krishnasamy of The Indian Express wrote, "Its partly a sermon, partly a feekless pack-up, mostly a letdown". Jayamanmadhan of Kalki in regards to Prabhu's performance felt he only had a cameo and added if he acts in more films like this, fans will forget him and felt Rajender's music was forgettable and concluded for a film which claims to reform student community will only make students gets addicted to bad vices.
