= Jenma Natchathram =

- Poster
- Directed by: Thakkali Srinivasan
- Screenplay by: Thakkali Srinivasan
- Story by: Krishnan
- Based on: The Omen by David Seltzer
- Starring: Pramod; G. Anandharam; Sindhuja; Baby Vichithra
- Cinematography: Dhayal Osho
- Edited by: Karthikeyas
- Music by: Premi–Srini
- Production company: Thirai Gangai Films
- Release date: 30 August 1991
- Running time: 117 minutes
- Country: India
- Language: Tamil

Jenma Natchathram (transl. Birth star) is a 1991 Indian Tamil-language supernatural horror film directed and co-written by Thakkali Srinivasan. A remake of the British-American film The Omen (1976), it stars newcomers Pramod, G. Anandharam, Sindhuja and Baby Vichithra. The film was released on 30 August 1991.

== Plot ==
Antony and his wife Jennifer are living in Coimbatore, where she gives birth to a boy who dies. The Hospital's Doctor Philips persuades Antony to secretly adopt a baby whose mother just died in childbirth. Antony does not tell Jennifer the child is not their own. They name him Xavier.

Five years later, Antony is now working as Assistant secretary to the Chief Minister of Tamil Nadu in Madras when mysterious events plague the family: a menacing Rottweiler appears at their home, Xavier's nanny publicly hangs herself during his fifth birthday party, new nanny Mrs. Elizabeth arrives unannounced, Xavier violently resists entering a church, and Xavier's presence terrifies horses at a park. Father Murphy warns Antony about Xavier's origins, hinting that he is not human and insisting Antony to meet Lawrence. He tells Antony that Xavier is the son of Satan, and that he will kill his parents unless he dies. Later, Murphy is killed by a falling lightning rod. Jennifer tells Antony she wants an abortion, which he opposes. Xavier knocks Jennifer over a railing to the floor below, injuring her and causing a miscarriage.

Photographer Swaminathan notices shadows in photographs of the nanny and of Father Murphy that presage their deaths. Swami shows Antony the photos along with news clippings and Biblical passages that suggest the coming of the Antichrist. He accompanies Antony to Coimbatore to investigate Xavier's birth. They learn that a fire destroyed the hospital, including Jennifer's maternity records. They find Doctor Phillips in a monastery, severely burned, mute, blind in one eye, and partly paralyzed. He directs them to a village where Xavier's biological mother is buried. Arriving to Xavier's mother's grave, Antony and Swami find a jackal carcass and, in the next plot, a child's skeleton with a shattered skull. Antony realizes that the jackal is Xavier's mother and the child is his own son, murdered so Xavier can take his place. A pack of Rottweilers drives Antony and Swami from the cemetery.

Antony calls Jennifer in hospital and asks her to come to Coimbatore. Before she can do so, Mrs. Elizabeth throws her to death from a window. Antony and Swami meet Archaeologist Lawrence who says if Xavier is the true Antichrist, he will bear a birthmark in the shape of three sixes. Lawrence gives Antony seven daggers with which to kill Xavier on hallowed ground. Antony refuses to do so, but Swamy remains convicted in their task. Afterwards, Swami is decapitated by a sheet of glass. Antony then reluctantly accepts his task.

Antony finds the birthmark on the sleeping Xavier's scalp and is attacked by Mrs. Elizabeth, whom he burns to death. Antony drives Xavier to a Church. His erratic driving draws the attention of the police. Antony drags the screaming Xavier to kill him, but is shot to death by police before he can do so.

The double funeral of Jennifer and Antony is attended by the Chief Minister. Later, it is shown that, a couple adopts and takes Xavier with them. Xavier turns and smiles at the camera.

== Cast ==
- Pramod as Antony
- G. Anandharam as Swaminathan
- Sindhuja as Jennifer
- Baby Vichithra as Xavier
- Vivek as David
- Prasanna as Doctor Sampath
- Indira Devi as Mrs. Elizabeth
- V. Gopalakrishnan as Doctor Philips
- Loose Mohan as John
- Sundari as Xavier's nanny
- Nassar as Father Murphy

== Production ==
Jenma Natchathram is the directorial debut of Thakkali Srinivasan. An unofficial remake of the American film The Omen (1976), it is the acting debut of Pramod, G. Anandharam, Sindhuja and Baby Vichithra.

== Release and reception ==
Jenma Natchathram was released on 30 August 1991. C. R. K. of Kalki gave a positive review, praising the camera work, absence of songs, and the combination of Sindhuja and Vichithra, but criticised Vivek's comedy.

== See also ==
- List of Indian films without songs
