= Madurai Veeran Enga Saami =

- Poster
- Directed by: Shanmuga Priyan
- Written by: Shanmuga Priyan
- Produced by: K. Balu
- Starring: Sathyaraj; Rupini
- Cinematography: Ashok Chowdry
- Edited by: Krishnan; Srinivas
- Music by: Ilaiyaraaja
- Production company: K. B. Films
- Release date: 22 June 1990
- Country: India
- Language: Tamil

Madurai Veeran Enga Saami (transl. Madurai Veeran, Our God) is a 1990 Indian Tamil-language film starring Sathyaraj and Rupini. It was released on 22 June 1990.

== Cast ==
- Sathyaraj as Mathi
- Rupini as Sakthi
- Goundamani as Balloon Kandasamy
- Senthil as Balusamy
- Jayabharathi as Theivanai
- Vinu Chakravarthy
- Manorama
- Sathyapriya as Nachiyar
- Pandu
- Vijay Krishnaraj
- Typist Gopu
- T. M. Samikannu
- C. K. Saraswathi
- Lalitha Kumari
- S. R. Vijaya as Alamelu
- Kullamani
- Ajay Rathnam
- Thyagu

== Soundtrack ==
Soundtrack was composed by Ilaiyaraaja.

Song	Singers	Lyrics
"Aathu Medu"	Malaysia Vasudevan	Gangai Amaran
"Mamava Parthu"	S. P. Balasubrahmanyam	Gangai Amaran
"Thangame"	Sunandha, Arunmozhi	Vaali
"Rangiyulla Rani"	Malaysia Vasudevan, Mano, S. N. Surender	Gangai Amaran
"Pottu Vechu"	Malaysia Vasudevan	Vaali
