= Minmini Poochigal =

- Poster
- Directed by: Raghu Vyaas
- Produced by: P. R. Janaga Raja
- Starring: Napoleon; Jaishankar; Bharath; Bhargavi
- Cinematography: Ramesh Vyaas
- Edited by: S. P. Bojaraj
- Music by: Adithyan
- Production company: P.R.J. Films
- Release date: 14 April 1993
- Country: India
- Language: Tamil

Minmini Poochigal (transl. Fireflies) is a 1993 Indian Tamil-language teen romance film directed by Raghu Vyaas. The film stars Napoleon, Jaishankar, Bharath and Yuvarani (credited as Bhargavi). It was released on 14 April 1993.

== Cast ==
- Napoleon as Victor
- Jaishankar as Thangaraj
- Bharath as Bharath
- Bhargavi as Bhargavi
- King Kong
- Silk Smitha
- Disco Shanti
- Livingston
- Ajay Rathnam as a police officer
- V. A. Moorthy

== Soundtrack ==
The music was composed by Adithyan.

Track listing
No.	Title	Singer(s)	Length
1.	"En Yarum Ilatha"	Sujatha Mohan	4:57
2.	"Kanmaniku Nenjil" (Male)	K. J. Yesudas	5:05
3.	"Kanmaniku Nenjil" (Female)	K. S. Chithra	5:05
4.	"Ottaka Marangal"	Adithyan	3:26
5.	"Thithikkum Paaru"	Subha	5:03
6.	"Vaa Pulimaane"	S. P. Balasubrahmanyam	4:47
Total length:			28:23

== Reception ==
A critic from The Indian Express wrote that "Good camera-work and good treatment of the subject by Raghu Vyas [...], aided by good performances by Napolean and Bhargavi (new name of Yuvarani [...]) make it worth viewing.
