= Asokavanam =

2001 film by Thakkali Srinivasan

- Directed by: Thakkali Srinivasan
- Written by: Thakkali Srinivasan
- Produced by: Kabilon; Kannan Parameswaran; Ambha Parameswaran
- Starring: Sriman; Livingston; Riyaz Khan; Rajashree
- Cinematography: K. C. Diwakar
- Music by: Balabharathy
- Production company: Housefull Pictures
- Release date: 12 October 2001
- Country: India
- Language: Tamil

Asokavanam is a 2001 Indian Tamil-language thriller film written and directed by Thakkali Srinivasan. The film stars Sriman, Livingston, Rajashree, and Riyaz Khan, while Master Mahendran and Baby Jennifer appear in supporting roles. Featuring music composed by Deva, the film was released on 12 October 2001.

== Cast ==
- Sriman as Madhu
- Livingston as Selvam
- Riyaz Khan as Mohan
- Rajashree as Uma
- Mohan Raman as Sadasivam
- Abhishek Shankar
- Master Mahendran as Rahul
- Baby Jennifer as Priya

== Reception ==
A reviewer from The Hindu noted "the script is good in the first half but sags in the second", adding "the director has not done much to sustain the viewers' interest or to keep them guessing". Chennai Online wrote "Despite its flaws, it is a commendable effort by the director to do something different".
