= Aivar (film) =

- Directed by: N. Priyan
- Written by: D. Sai Prasad (dialogues)
- Screenplay by: D. Sai Prasad
- Story by: AGR Right Films
- Produced by: A. G. Raja
- Starring: Vijay Anand; Ila; Perarasan; Hussain; Athulya
- Cinematography: P. Chandran
- Edited by: K. Maha Vishnu
- Music by: Kavi Periyathambi
- Production company: AGR Right Films
- Release date: 11 March 2011
- Running time: 120 minutes
- Country: India
- Language: Tamil

Aivar (transl. Five People), also known as Ivar, is a 2011 Indian Tamil language comedy drama buddy film directed by N. Priyan. The film stars newcomers Vijay Anand, Ila, Perarasan, Hussain and Athulya, with Sriman, Harish, Nambi Seenivasan, Prabhakar, Jayashree, Indhulekha, Bava Lakshmanan, V. M. Subburaj, Kovai Senthil and Kottai Perumal playing supporting roles. The film had musical score by Kavi Periyathambi and was released on 11 March 2011.

== Plot ==
In Tiruvannamalai, Viji (Vijay Anand), Ila (Jinga), Surya (Perarasan) and Sundaram (Hussain) are best friends and jobless youngsters. They love drinking alcohol so they often lie to their family and they give them money. Whereas in Arakandanalur, Ramana (Sriman) is a wealthy rice mill owner and lives with his sister Soundarya (Athulya). His best friend is Thiru (Harish) and he can do anything for him thus it makes his family jealous. Ramana then marries Dakshayani (Jayashree).

One year later, Ramana cannot digest that Thiru betrayed him so he becomes a drunkard. Surya falls in love with Soundarya at first sight. One day, Ramana and the four friends have an altercation in a bar. Later, Jinga has stomach pain and he is rushed to the hospital. There, the doctor informs them that Jinga has a tumour in his stomach and it has to be removed immediately. Jinga's family has no money for the operation, so his friends ask money to their family but they don't believe them and refuse to give money. At the hospital, Ramana feels bad for Jinga and pays for his operation. Thereafter, the four friends decide to earn money and Ramana helps them financially to start a business. The four friends feel sorry for Ramana because of his drinking habits and Soundarya tells them the reason. Ramana's family and his wife felt jealous about Thiru and they tried to brainwash Ramana. When Thiru came to know about it, he decided to break their friendship.

The four friends try their best to save Ramana and Thiru's friendship. Ramana eventually makes up with Thiru and Soundarya accepts Surya's love.

== Cast ==
- Vijay Anand as Viji
- Ila as Jinga
- Perarasan as Surya
- Hussain as Sundaram
- Athulya as Soundarya
- Sriman as Ramana
- Harish as Thiru
- Nambi Seenivasan
- Prabhakar as Prabhakar
- Jayashree as Dakshayani
- Indhulekha as Malliga
- Bava Lakshmanan as Malliga's husband
- V. M. Subburaj
- Kovai Senthil
- Kottai Perumal as Tea master

== Production ==
N. Priyan, who assisted leading directors like Aabavanan, Ezhil and Badri made his directorial debut with Aivar under the banner of AGR Right Films. Newcomers Vijay Anand, Ila, Perarasan, Hussain and Athulya were cast to play the lead roles while Sriman, Harish, Jayashree and many others have performed in prominent roles. D. Sai Prasad took care of the dialogues and screenplay while Suryan FM fame Kavi Periyathambi had scored music for the film.

== Soundtrack ==
Aivar

Soundtrack album by Kavi Periyathambi
- Released: 2010
- Recorded: 2010
- Genre: Feature film soundtrack
- Length: 32:44
- Label: Junglee Music
- Producer: Kavi Periyathambi

Kavi Periyathambi chronology
Muthukku Muthaaga (2011)	Aivar (2010)	Pandi Oliperukki Nilayam (2012)

The soundtrack was composed by Kavi Periyathambi. The soundtrack, released in 2010, features 7 tracks written by Palani Bharathi, Na. Muthukumar and Kavi Periyathambi.

Tracklist
No.	Title	Singer(s)	Length
1.	"Ammani Amman Gopura"	Madhu Balakrishnan	5:16
2.	"Malliga Malliga"	Tippu	5:52
3.	"Aaja Kujha"	Mukesh Mohamed	5:00
4.	"Enga Veetu Nai"	Benny Dayal	5:16
5.	"Kothavaranga"	Baby Harini	1:29
6.	"Vaanam Vedithadu"	Karthik	4:52
7.	"Aaja Kujha"	Mukesh Mohamed	4:59
Total length:			32:44

== Release ==
Initially, the film had its release date fixed on 11 February 2011, but it was released the following week on 11 March 2011.

Kungumam gave the film a positive review. In contrast, Dinamalar gave the film a mixed review.
