= Vaai Kozhuppu =

- Poster
- Directed by: Muktha Srinivasan
- Written by: Babu-Gopu (dialogues)
- Screenplay by: Muktha Srinivasan
- Produced by: Ramaswamy Govind
- Starring: Pandiarajan; Gautami; Janagaraj; S. S. Chandran
- Cinematography: Muktha S. Sundar
- Edited by: V. P. Krishnan
- Music by: Chandrabose
- Production company: Mukthaa Films
- Release date: 17 February 1989
- Country: India
- Language: Tamil

Vaai Kozhuppu (transl. Loud Mouth) is a 1989 Indian Tamil-language comedy thriller film, directed by Muktha Srinivasan and produced by Ramaswamy Govind and Muktha S. Ravi. The film stars Pandiarajan, Gautami, Janagaraj and S. S. Chandran. It was released on 17 February 1989.

== Plot ==
Murthy and Baskar are Chokkalingam's sons-in-law. Murthy cunningly squanders Chokkalingam's wealth, deflecting blame onto Baskar, the younger son-in-law. To deflect these accusations, Baskar devises a plan to find a suitable groom for Usha, his youngest sister-in-law, hoping the newcomer can expose Murthy's true intentions to their family. Vasu, a resourceful and witty individual, agrees to Baskar's scheme. He begins wooing Usha, who aspires to become a newsreader. Baskar introduces Vasu to Usha, presenting him as a television channel employee. The two spend time together, develop feelings, and their marriage is soon arranged. After the wedding, Vasu moves into his father-in-law's home. Initially, Murthy plots to eliminate Vasu by assigning him to collect overdue rent from the notorious Vinayaga colony. However, Vasu bravely confronts the goons, successfully retrieving the outstanding rents.

Meanwhile, Vasu's father weds Banaganapalli Mangamma, a Telugu-speaking sweeper woman. Murthy brings Vasu's father and stepmother Mangamma into their home, intending to stir trouble and Mangamma's relatives follow, irritating Chokkalingam. Murthy further fuels tension by bringing the TV station head, who exposes Vasu's false employment claims, driving a wedge between Vasu and Usha. However, Usha soon grasps Vasu and Baskar's true intentions and reconciles with Vasu. Chokkalingam suffers a fatal heart attack. His will reveals that all properties and wealth transfer to Murthy, his elder son-in-law. Vasu and Baskar are outraged; Vasu impulsively declares to the lawyer that they'll murder Murthy to reclaim the properties. With Murthy now the sole owner, Vasu and Baskar must vacate the house. They purchase a rope from a street vendor, intending to strangle Murthy.

Upon arriving at a cottage where Murthy frequently visits, they're stunned to find him dead, exactly as they had planned. As they flee, Murali witnesses their escape. The police launch an investigation, and careless remarks by Vasu's father and Mangamma, combined with statements from the lawyer, Murali, and the street vendor, spark a manhunt for Vasu and Baskar. Secretly, the duo meets their wives at a temple and professes their innocence. Vasu narrowly evades Inspector Ramani. With a bounty on their heads, they flee across various locations, narrowly escaping the lawyer and street vendor at a hotel. The pair reaches a liquor shop, gets intoxicated, and escapes as police arrive. They return to Murthy's house, where their wives urge them to uncover the true killer. However, Vasu and Baskar shift suspicion onto each other. Kalpana, Baskar's wife, reports Vasu as the murderer to the police, who arrive at the house. Disguised as police officers, Vasu and Baskar escape after attacking them. While in disguise, This leads them to confront illicit liquor manufacturers, and they escape in a van driven by Murali.

They follow Murali to a house where Shanthi is being held captive, whose photo they had already seen in the wallet Baskar took from the crime scene. Through Murali and Shanthi's conversation, they learn that Sugavanam, Murali's boss and Grand Hotel proprietor, lies comatose, and Shanthi is imprisoned for knowing a crucial secret. Vasu and Baskar retrieve a photo from Shanthi's house, revealing Sugavanam's fake coma. They investigate Grand Hotel, where the manager discloses Shanthi's illicit affair with Sugavanam. A hotel photo shows Shanthi wearing a ring identical to their family's, leading Vasu and Baskar to deduce that Sugavanam, enamored with Shanthi, murdered Murthy due to his relationship with her.

Murali captures and rigs Vasu and Baskar with bombs, but they narrowly escape. Disguised as nurses, they infiltrate the hospital, where police and Vasu's parents are present. Vasu and Baskar attempt to expose Sugavanam's fake coma but fail. Vasu initiates a bomb hoax, evacuating the hospital. Sugavanam flees, attacking Vasu, but Vasu apprehends Sugavanam and Murali after an intense car chase and physical confrontation. Shanthi confesses that Murali overheard Vasu and Baskar's angry plans to kill Murthy, exploiting the opportunity to commit the murder and frame them. Exonerated, Vasu and Baskar are hailed as heroes for solving the murder case.

== Cast ==
- Pandiarajan as Vasu
- Gautami as Usha, Vasu's wife
- Janagaraj as Baskar
- S. S. Chandran as Vasu's father
- Jai Ganesh as Murthy
- Manorama as Mangamma, Vasu's stepmother
- Vadivukkarasi as Murthy's wife
- Vedhavathi
- Disco Shanti as Shanthi, a dancer
- Kalaranjini as Kalpana, Baskar's wife
- T. S. Raghavendra as Chokkalingam
- Kitty as Sugavanam, proprietor of Grand Hotel
- Livingston as Murali, Sugavanam's henchman
- Idichapuli Selvaraj as a street vendor
- Bayilvan Ranganathan as Ramani, an Inspector
- Typist Gopu as TV Station head
- Pasi Narayanan as Josiyar Thandapani
- Oru Viral Krishna Rao as a bus conductor
- Vellai Subbaiah as a man in temple
- Meesai Murugesan as Narayanan, liquor shop owner
- LIC Narasimhan as a doctor
- Haja Sheriff as hospital compounder

== Production ==
Vaai Kozhuppu is Pandiarajan's second collaboration with Srinivasan after Katha Nayagan (1988).

== Soundtrack ==
Soundtrack was composed by Chandrabose. Lyrics were written by Vairamuthu.

Track listing
No.	Title	Singer(s)	Length
1.	"Pappa Sabhayil"	Vani Jairam
2.	"Mulichi Mulichi"	Mano
3.	"Ponnamma"	Mano, Lalitha Sagari
4.	"Edhedho Karpanai"	T. L. Thyagarajan, Lalitha Sagari
5.	"Vaai Kozhuppu"	Chandrabose

== Reception ==
The Indian Express wrote, "Gopu-Babu's dialogues follow the stageplay formula of a joke a minute and Janakaraj's bent in this enterprise and Pandyaraj's easy manner put Vaay Kozhuppu out of trouble's way".
