= Adhisaya Manithan =

- Title card
- Directed by: Velu Prabhakaran
- Screenplay by: Jeyadevi
- Produced by: Thakkali Srinivasan
- Starring: Gautami; Nizhalgal Ravi; Chitra; Ajay Rathnam
- Cinematography: Ajayan Basi
- Edited by: Shyam
- Music by: Premi–Srini
- Production company: Perfect Cine Arts
- Release date: 6 July 1990
- Running time: 101 minutes
- Country: India
- Language: Tamil

Adhisaya Manithan (transl. Mysterious Human) is a 1990 Indian Tamil-language science fiction slasher film directed by Velu Prabhakaran. It is a sequel to Naalai Manithan (1989). The film stars Gautami, Ajay Rathnam, Anand, Kuyili, Kovai Sarala and Silk Smitha. It was released on 6 July 1990.

== Plot ==
Five years after the incidents of the first film, researcher Charles, the brother of one of the Scientists, finds that John, the psychotic killer, is still alive and informs his friend Ravi, a Police officer to kill him as soon as possible.

Four college students – Kousalya, Urmila, Lynda and Nancy along with their boyfriends Gupta, Majnu, Vivek and Ramani go for vacation to an isolated mansion set aside of the town. They also take their colleague Ganga, a depressed girl, along with them by lying to her that they are going to meet a doctor to treat her medical condition. The mansion looks abandoned and it is shown that there is no human activity nearby.

As the researcher suggested, the psychotic John, who previously murdered a rancher and his wife, roams around the mansion to kill the youngsters. While on a trip, some goons misbehaves with Kousalya, and get beaten up by Gupta. The Goons in revenge enter the mansion to kill Gupta, but were killed by John one by one. In the meantime Charles, after examining the dead bodies of the rancher and his wife gives Ravi some bullets injected with drugs which may stop activities of John.

The devilish John now preys on the girls and their respective boyfriends, one by one, except Ganga. He also kills the butler, who advises Ganga to escape from the place. John also strangles a policeman who interferes with his plans. The policeman alerts Ravi about John before dying.

When John chases to kill Ganga, she hides at a nearby petrol station. She burns him by spraying petrol on him. But a furious and fully burnt John survives the accident and pursues her into a factory, where she activates hydraulic press, and crushes him. Partially crashed and immovable John suddenly grabs Ganga. But she breaks free from him and faints near the hydraulic press. John stands up and walks towards Ganga, to kill her. At the time, Ravi enters the spot and shoots John through the heart, finally killing him with injected bullets. Finally, Ravi and injured Ganga leave the factory where fellow policemen wait for them outside. Elsewhere, John awakens as an undead skeleton.

== Cast ==
- Gautami as Ganga
- Nizhalgal Ravi as Inspector Ravi
- Ajay Rathnam as John
- Chitra as Kousalya
- Kovai Sarala as Urmila
- Chinni Jayanth as Majunu
- Kapil Dev as Gupta
- Kuyili as Lynda
- Anand as Vivek
- Raja as Ramani
- Silk Smitha as Nancy
- Radha Ravi as a farmer
- Charan Raj as Charles, Dr. Shankar's brother
- Kitty as Sebastian
- V. Gopalakrishnan as Police Chief

== Soundtrack ==
The soundtrack was composed by Premi–Srini and lyrics were written by Muthubharathi.

Title	Singer(s
"Valibathin Vizhiyile (Lady)"	Anuradha, Chorus
"Valibathin Vizhiyile (Men)"	S. Giridharan, Chorus
"Medai Eruvean"	Mano
"Kaalam Poga Poga"	Mano
"Manjal Azhaikkindrathe"	Mano, Sunandha
"Ulagame"	Sunandha
"Avyaktho"	Sunandha, Sundarrajan

== Reception ==
C. R. K. of Kalki wrote that if fear is the only objective, then the filmmakers succeeded in it.
