= J. Livingston =

Indian actor, comedian, screenwriter (born 1957)

J.Livingston
- Born: Philip Livingston Jones; 21 August 1957 (age 69); Madras, Madras State (now Chennai, Tamil Nadu), India
- Occupations: Actor; comedian; screenwriter
- Years active: 1982–present
- Spouse: Jessy (m. 1997)
- Children: 2, including Jovita
- Relatives: Peter Selvakumar (brother-in-law)
- Awards: Kalaimamani Award (1999)

Philip Livingston Jones, commonly credited by his mononym Livingston, is an Indian actor, comedian and screenwriter who usually plays supporting and comedy roles in Tamil films.

He is known for the films Captain Prabhakaran (1991), Sundara Purushan (1996) and Sollamale (1998). He has acted in over 180 films.

== Career ==
He wrote the screenplay for the movies Kanni Rasi (1985) and Kaakki Sattai (1985) along with G. M. Kumar.

His first starring role was in Poonthotta Kaavalkaaran (1988). He started out playing villains and graduated to playing lead roles with Sundara Purushan (1996), Sollamale (1998), Viralukketha Veekkam (1999), En Purushan Kuzhandhai Maadhiri (2001) and Engalukkum Kaalam Varum (2001) are other films in which he has appeared in lead roles.

At the peak of his career in the late 1990s and early 2000s, Livingston opted to take on a mix of lead roles, antagonistic roles and cameo roles.

== Personal life ==
Livingston was born in a Christian family in Chennai, Tamilnadu. His father, Samuel Jones worked as a supervisor in Binny and Co., while his mother was a homemaker who was of Malaysian Tamil descent. He attended ELM Fabricus Hr.Sec. School in Purasawalkam until grade 10 after which he pursued his cinema career.

On 6 September 1997, he married Jessy Irudayaraj a Roman Catholic in a private ceremony in Chennai. The couple have two daughters including Jovita.

== Filmography ==
=== Tamil films ===
==== 1980s ====
List of J. Livingston Tamil film credits as actor in the 1980s
Year	Film	Role	Notes
1982	Darling, Darling, Darling	Livingston	Uncredited role
1988	Poonthotta Kaavalkaaran	Ramkumar	
1989	Vaai Kozhuppu	Murali	
1989	Paattukku Oru Thalaivan		
1989	Pick Pocket		
1989	Nyaya Tharasu	Nagappan	
1989	Naalai Manithan	Livingston	
1989	Valadhu Kalai Vaithu Vaa		

==== 1990s ====
List of J. Livingston Tamil film credits as actor in the 1990s
Year	Film	Role	Notes
1990	En Uyir Thozhan	Dilli Babu	
1990	Oru Veedu Iru Vasal	Arun Kapoor	credited as Ranjan
1990	Paattukku Naan Adimai	Danny	
1990	Ethir Kaatru	Maasi	
1990	Puthu Paatu	Vadivelu	
1991	Irumbu Pookkal		
1991	Captain Prabhakaran	Krishnamurthy	credited as Ranjan
1991	Thanga Thamaraigal	Sathish	
1991	Ayul Kaithi	Sudharshan	
1991	Mill Thozhilali	Prakash	
1991	Onnum Theriyatha Pappa		
1991	Apoorva Naagam	Maayandi	
1991	Mookuthi Poomeley		
1991	En Pottukku Sonthakkaran		
1991	Nenjamundu Nermaiyundu		
1991	Paattondru Ketten	Rocky	
1992	Amaran	Inspector Duraipandi	
1992	Pudhu Varusham		
1993	Captain Magal	Livi	
1993	Minmini Poochigal		
1993	Pathini Penn	Kadikalingam	
1994	Veera	Chandran	
1994	Chinna Madam		
1994	Pondattiye Deivam	Pandiyan	
1995	Oru Oorla Oru Rajakumari		
1995	Chellakannu	Thangavel	
1995	Witness	Niranjan	
1995	Makkal Aatchi	Govindasamy	
1996	Sundara Purushan	Ganeshan	Lead role
1996	Thuraimugam	Gowri Kumar	
1998	Jolly	Chakravarthy	
1998	Sollamale	Nataraj	Lead role
1999	Poomagal Oorvalam	Aavudayappan (Armstrong)	
1999	Suyamvaram	Kannan	
1999	Vaalee	Livi	Guest appearance
1999	Viralukketha Veekkam	Ravishankar	Lead role

==== 2000s ====
List of J. Livingston film Tamil credits as actor in the 2000s
Year	Film	Role	Notes
2000	Vaanathaippola	Shanmugam	
2000	Vallarasu	Chidambaram Pillai IPS	
2000	Athey Manithan	Mandhira Moorthy	
2000	Unnai Kann Theduthey	Raghu	
2000	Ninaivellam Nee	Kalyana Sundaram	
2001	Engalukkum Kaalam Varum	Kuppan	
2001	En Purushan Kuzhandhai Maathiri	Murugesan	Lead role
2001	Sonnal Thaan Kaadhala	Roja's uncle	
2001	Chocolate	ACP Jayachandran	
2001	Asokavanam	Selvam	
2002	Aasai Aasaiyai		
2002	Guruvamma	Thulasi	
2002	Charlie Chaplin	Vishwa	
2002	Thamizh	Anbazhagan	
2002	Raja	Mathi	
2002	Arputham	Govind	
2002	Namma Veetu Kalyanam	Manickam	
2002	Virumbugiren		Guest appearance
2003	Kadhal Sugamanathu	Thief	
2003	Annai Kaligambal	Madhu	
2003	Kalatpadai	'Cut' Raj	
2003	Raamachandra	Sathyamoorthy	
2003	Military	Balasubramaniam	
2003	Dum	Inspector Boopathi	
2003	Banda Paramasivam	Ravi	
2003	Inidhu Inidhu Kadhal Inidhu		
2003	Whistle	Professor Panneerselvam	
2003	Priyamaana Thozhi	Kumar	
2003	Vadakku Vaasal	Annamalai	
2004	M. Kumaran S/O Mahalakshmi	Sheikh Fakhrudeen	
2004	Kuthu	Adhi Kesav	
2004	Vayasu Pasanga	Devaraj	
2004	Settai	Periyasamy	
2004	Super Da	Subramani	
2004	Senthalam Poove		
2005	Thirupaachi	Inspector Inba Raghavan	
2005	Ayodhya	Hussain Bhai	
2005	Sevvel		
2005	Jithan	Surya's father	
2005	Chinna	Police Officer	
2005	Daas	Allapichai	
2005	Sorry Enaku Kalyanamayidichu	Appu	
2006	Aathi	Anjali's father	
2006	Sudesi	Ramasamy	
2006	Thirupathi	Chanakkiyan	
2006	Unakkum Enakkum	Lalitha's father-in-law	
2006	Nenjirukkum Varai	ACP Gandhi	
2006	Jayanth		
2007	Kuttrapathirikai	Hari	
2007	Naan Avanillai	David Fernandez	
2007	Parattai Engira Azhagu Sundaram	Parattai's father	
2007	Kasu Irukkanum	Manikkavel	
2007	Sivaji	Police Inspector	
2007	Cheena Thaana 001	CID Aanthaikannan	Guest appearance
2007	Naalaiya Pozhuthum Unnodu	Sakthi's father	
2007	Puli Varudhu	Vaitheeswaran	
2007	Kanna	Ashirvadham	
2007	Ippadikku En Kadhal	Vilvanathan	
2008	Aegan	Kamalakannan	
2008	Anjathe	Maasilamani	
2008	Ashoka	Politician	
2008	Dindigul Sarathy	Psychiatrist	
2008	Jayamkondaan	Police Inspector	
2008	Kadhalil Vizhunthen	Train passenger	
2008	Kuselan	Kuppusamy	
2008	Satyam	Politician	Bilingual film
2008	Sutta Pazham	Inspector Prasad	
2008	Thotta	Chief Minister Manimaran	
2008	Vambu Sandai	Nehru	
2009	A Aa E Ee		
2009	Enga Raasi Nalla Raasi	Pandian	
2009	Satrumun Kidaitha Thagaval	Film director Rajan	
2009	Solla Solla Inikkum	Jayaraman	
2009	Brahmadeva	Dravidan	
2009	Thoranai	Murugan's father	

==== 2010s ====
List of J. Livingston Tamil film credits as actor in the 2010s
Year	Film	Role	Notes
2010	Ambasamudram Ambani	Johnson	
2010	Irandu Mugam	Parthasarathy's uncle	
2010	Kutti Pisasu		
2010	Magane En Marumagane	Mahadeva	
2010	Thillalangadi	Nisha's uncle	
2010	Vallakottai	Advocate	
2011	Sankarankovil	Doctor	
2011	Kaavalan	College principal	
2011	Moondraam Pournami		
2011	Sattapadi Kutram	Santhana Swamy	
2011	Venghai	Mariyappan	
2011	Yuvan	Jeevanantham	
2012	Vilayada Vaa	Jyothi	
2012	Adhisaya Ulagam	Neelakantan	
2012	Kasi Kuppam		
2013	Kan Pesum Vaarthaigal		
2013	Yaaruda Mahesh		
2013	Thirumathi Thamizh	Lawyer	
2013	Idharkuthane Aasaipattai Balakumara	Sammandham	
2014	Amara	Sebastian	
2014	Nenjirukkumvarai Ninaivirukkum	Bhaskar	
2015	Miss Pannidatheenga Appuram Varuthapaduveenga		
2016	Onbathilirundhu Pathuvarai	Annachi	
2016	Vellikizhamai 13am Thethi	Ganesan	
2017	Unnai Thottu Kolla Vaa	Ranganatha Boopathi	
2017	Mathipen		
2017	Kattappava Kanom	Aali	
2017	Saravanan Irukka Bayamaen	Selvam	
2017	Paakanum Pola Irukku		
2017	Magalir Mattum	Mangalamurthi	
2017	En Aaloda Seruppa Kaanom	Bhai	
2018	Pei Irukka Illaya	Inspector Inavana	
2018	Traffic Ramasamy	Aavudayappan	
2018	Sarkar	Venkatesan	
2018	Silukkuvarupatti Singam	Muthaiya	
2019	Peranbu	House owner	
2019	Agni Devi		
2019	Perazhagi ISO	Veerasamy	
2019	Gurkha	Chief Minister	
2019	Petromax	Paripooranam	
2019	Capmaari	Jai's father	

==== 2020s ====
List of J. Livingston Tamil film credits as actor in the 2020s
Year	Film	Role	Notes
2020	Ayya Ullen Ayya		
2020	Thottu Vidum Thooram		
2020	Vaanga Padam Paarkalam		
2021	Pei Mama		
2021	Annaatthe	Irulandi	
2021	Mounika		
2022	Naai Sekar	Police inspector Thangaraj	
2022	Taanakkaran	Rajendran	
2022	Radha Krishna		
2022	Gargi	Sandra's father	
2022	The Legend	Gopi	
2022	Eppo Kalyanam		
2023	Moondram Pournami		
2023	Kannitheevu		
2023	Ghosty		
2024	Lal Salaam	Manickam	
2024	Pambattam		
2025	Rajaputhiran	Meesai	
2025	Chennai City Gangsters	Pasupathy	
2025	Mareesan	Chaari	
2025	Madharaasi	Raghu's delusional father	
2025	Kumaara Sambavam		
2025	Messenger		
2025	Nirvaagam Porupalla		
2026	Lockdown		
2026	Mustafa Mustafa		
2026	Vengeance	Thirupathi	
2026	Charukesi		
2026	Dark Giant		
2026	Black Gold	Marimuthu	

=== Other language films ===
List of J. Livingston other language film credits as actor
Year	Film	Role	Language	Notes
1992	Hello Darling	Alexander	Telugu	
2005	Love Story	Haribabu	Kannada	
2008	Salute	Politician	Telugu	Multilingual films
2010	Cara Majaka	Police officer	Telugu	Multilingual films
2011	Keratam	Mohan Rao	Telugu	Multilingual films
2026	Couple Friendly	M. Thumbathigam Sekar	Telugu	

=== As writer ===
List of J. Livingston film credits as screenwriter
Year	Film	Writer	Notes
1985	Kanni Rasi	Screenplay	
1985	Kaakki Sattai	Story	
1986	Aruvadai Naal	Story	credited as Livi
1996	Sundara Purushan	Yes	

=== As voice actor ===
List of J. Livingston film credits as voice actor
Year	Film	Actor
1994	Suriyan	Babu Antony

=== Television ===
List of J. Livingston television credits
Year	Title	Role	Channel	Notes
1987	Kadal Purathil	Peter	DD	
2018	Jimiki Kamal	Kallilio	Sun Life	
2020–2021	Kannana Kanne	Kodeeshwaran	Sun TV	
2020	Poove Poochudava	Poiyamozhi	Zee Tamil	Special appearance
2021	Sembaruthi		Zee Tamil	Special appearance
2022–2023	Amudhavum Annalakshmiyum	Kathiresan	Zee Tamil	Extended Special Appearance
2022	Ninaithale Inikkum	Amarthalingam	Zee Tamil	Special appearance
2024	My Perfectt Husband	Subramani	Disney+ Hotstar	
2025	Parijatham		Zee Tamil	

== Awards ==
- Kalaimamani Award - 1999
