= Rajasekaran =

Rajasekaran is a given name and surname. People with the name include:

== Surname ==
- Shanmuganathan Rajasekaran
- G. N. S. Rajasekaran
- Govindasamy Rajasekaran
- Gnana Rajasekaran
- Sindhu Rajasekaran
- S. Rajasekaran
- V. Rajasekaran

== Given name ==
- Rajasekaran Gunnasekaran
- Rajasekaran Pichaya

== Other ==
- M. Rajasekharan
- Robert–Rajasekaran
- S. Rajasekharan
