= Sriman (actor) =

Indian actor

- Born: Karri Srinivasa Reddy; 14 February 1972 (age 54); Rajamundry, Andhra Pradesh, India
- Occupation: Actor
- Years active: 1972–1984; 1991–present
- Spouse: Namitha Reddy Karri
- Parent: Karri Prakash Reddy

Karri Srinivasa Reddy (born 14 February 1972), known professionally as Sriman, is an Indian actor who works predominantly in Tamil cinema, along with a few Telugu films. He has acted in supporting, antagonistic, and lead roles in over 135 films, including Sethu (1999), Panchathanthiram (2002), Aayutha Ezhuthu (2004), Aegan (2008), Muni 2: Kanchana (2011), and its sequel Kanchana 2 (2015). Sriman is also known for his frequent collaborations with actor Vijay in films such as Love Today (1997), Friends (2001), and Pokkiri (2007).

== Early life ==
Kumaravatha Srinivasa Reddy was born into a Telugu Hindu family in 1972. He is the son of noted producer Kumaravatha Prakash Reddy.

== Career ==
Sriman started his film career as a child artist in the 1972 Telugu film Korada Rani and later worked in a few films. Until 1984, he performed and returned to continue his academic studies after acting in films directed by his uncle KS Reddy and mostly produced by his father. After his college studies, he returned to films.

In the 90s, he played the hero's friend in several films. He was spotted by director Geetha Krishna for Keechu Rallu (1991). Tamil director Kasthuri Raja spotted him while dancing in Kala Master's dance class and introduced in Mouna Mozhi, then Vikraman spotted and gave him a supporting role in his Tamil film Pudhiya Mannargal. He considers his performance in the Vijay-starrer Love Today as a turning point in his career. He has frequently appeared in Kamal Haasan's comedy films during the 2000s, including Pammal K. Sambandam, Panchathantiram, Nala Damayanthi, Unnaipol Oruvan, and Manmadan Ambu.

In the mid-2000s, he appeared in a series of lead roles in films with an adult theme including Sorry Enaku Kalyanamayidichu (2005), Unarchigal (2006) and the unreleased Sati Savithri. He recalled memorable moments as a down memory lane moment in an exclusive interview, where he and Vijay had to sit in one position for a long period of time from morning to afternoon for a hilarious comic scene during film shooting of Vaseegara (2003). During his acting career, he frequently collaborated with Vijay in most of the latter's films including Love Today (1997), Nenjinile (1999), Friends (2001), Vaseegara (2003), Pokkiri (2007), Azhagiya Tamil Magan (2007), Villu (2009), Sura (2010), Bairavaa (2017), Master (2021), and Varisu (2023), appearing as his friend, his assistant, or an antagonist. His 100th film appearance came in Vijay starrer Sura which became a box office bomb due to mixed to negative reviews. His performance as Raghava Lawrence's elder brother in Kanchana (2011) was well received by the audiences, mostly appreciating and admiring his humor tone.

He made his debut as a film producer Parimala Thiraiyarangam (2011) under his film production company Wales Productions. He credited Vikram for voluntarily helping him out in terms of teaching the craft of acting during the film shooting sets of Sketch (2018) and Sriman insisted that Vikram was one of his mentors who had been influential in his acting career as Vikram taught Sriman how to perform and emote in front of camera. He was seen seen in superstar Rajinikanth starrer Darbar (2020). Sriman makes his presence felt in the comedy-drama Baby and Baby (2025).

== Filmography ==
=== Tamil ===
| Year | Film | Role | Notes |
|---|---|---|---|
| 1992 | Mouna Mozhi | James | |
| 1994 | Athiradi Padai | | |
| 1994 | Pudhiya Mannargal | | |
| 1996 | Priyam | | |
| 1997 | Raasi | Rathnavelu | |
| 1997 | Love Today | Ravi | |
| 1998 | Thulli Thirintha Kaalam | Saravanan | |
| 1998 | Nilaave Vaa | Laasar | |
| 1998 | Guru Paarvai | Dancer | Guest appearance |
| 1999 | Nenjinile | Chandru | |
| 1999 | Iraniyan | Iraniyan's friend | |
| 1999 | Sethu | Sethu's friend | |
| 2000 | Vallarasu | Raheem | |
| 2001 | Dheena | Auto driver | |
| 2001 | Friends | Gowtham | |
| 2001 | Vaanchinathan | Siva | |
| 2001 | Kaatrukkenna Veli | Dr. Subhash Chandra Bose | |
| 2001 | Krishna Krishna | Balakrishnan | |
| 2001 | Dosth | Dharmaraj | |
| 2001 | Narasimha | Terrorist | |
| 2001 | Asokavanam | Madhu | |
| 2001 | Manadhai Thirudivittai | Ashok | |
| 2001 | Thavasi | Thangarasu | |
| 2002 | Pammal K. Sambandam | Malathi's Brother | |
| 2002 | Saptham | Pradeep | |
| 2002 | Enge Enadhu Kavithai | Bhaskar | |
| 2002 | Panchathantiram | Hanumanth Reddy | |
| 2002 | Shree | Sivakumar | |
| 2002 | Jaya | Balaji | |
| 2002 | Virumbugiren | | |
| 2003 | Ramachandra | Suresh Kumar | |
| 2003 | Chokka Thangam | Muthu's friend | |
| 2003 | Vaseegara | Sriman | |
| 2003 | Pop Corn | | |
| 2003 | Nala Damayanthi | Badri | |
| 2003 | Thayumanavan | Chellamuthu | |
| 2003 | Thennavan | Auto rickshaw driver | |
| 2003 | Diwan | Duraisingam's son | |
| 2003 | Kadhal Kirukkan | Police Officer | |
| 2003 | Indru | Richard D'Souza | |
| 2004 | Aaytha Ezhuthu | Dilli | |
| 2004 | Kudaikul Mazhai | | |
| 2005 | Sukran | Corrupt Police Officer | |
| 2005 | Thaka Thimi Tha | Sri | |
| 2005 | Thullum Kaalam | Meter Govind | |
| 2005 | Sorry Enaku Kalyanamayidichu | Ashok | |
| 2006 | Unarchigal | Ramesh | |
| 2006 | Imsai Arasan 23rd Pulikecei | Agandamuthu | |
| 2006 | Nenjirukkum Varai | Hospital MD | |
| 2006 | Kovai Brothers | | |
| 2007 | Pokkiri | Saravanan | |
| 2007 | Viyabari | Suryaprakash's PA | |
| 2007 | Thoovanam | Sriman | |
| 2007 | Satham Podathey | Police inspector | |
| 2007 | Nam Naadu | Bala | |
| 2007 | Vegam | Cop | |
| 2007 | Azhagiya Tamil Magan | Sakthi | |
| 2008 | Pattaya Kelappu | Ananthakrishnan | |
| 2008 | Sila Nerangalil | | |
| 2008 | Arasangam | Terrorist | |
| 2008 | Pandi | Rajapandi | |
| 2008 | Nalla Ponnu Ketta Paiyyan | Anand | |
| 2008 | Naayagan | Viswanath | |
| 2008 | Aegan | John's bodyguard | |
| 2008 | Sadhu Miranda | Dancer | Cameo appearance |
| 2008 | Naan Aval Adhu | | Unreleased |
| 2009 | Villu | Max | |
| 2009 | Satrumun Kidaitha Thagaval | | |
| 2009 | Ilampuyal | | |
| 2009 | Thoranai | Ganesan | |
| 2009 | Engal Aasan | Kumar | |
| 2009 | Aarumaname | Moorthy | |
| 2009 | Unnaipol Oruvan | Aravind Babu | |
| 2010 | Sura | Thandapani | |
| 2010 | Indrasena | | |
| 2010 | Mandabam | | |
| 2010 | Manmadan Ambu | Madhanagopal's friend | |
| 2011 | Aivar | Ramana | |
| 2011 | Muni 2: Kanchana | Raghava's brother | |
| 2011 | Aduthathu | Prathap | |
| 2011 | Vedi | Cheemachu alias Srinivasan | |
| 2011 | Vellore Maavattam | | |
| 2011 | Sadhurangam | Chandran | Delayed release; Filmed in 2003–06 |
| 2011 | Anandha Thollai | | |
| 2011 | Naane Varuven | | |
| 2012 | Billa II | Lawyer | |
| 2012 | Ajantha | | Delayed release; Filmed in 2006 |
| 2013 | Samar | Jayaraj | |
| 2013 | Naiyaandi | Paramjothy | |
| 2014 | Azhagiya Pandipuram | Veera Dayalan | |
| 2015 | Aambala | Naddu Ponnu's Husband | |
| 2015 | Kanchana 2 | Dr. Prasad | Edison Award for Best Supporting Actor |
| 2015 | Massu Engira Masilamani | Salesman Sripathy | |
| 2016 | Miruthan | Mall Security | |
| 2016 | Muthina Kathirika | Gopi | |
| 2017 | Bairavaa | PK's assistant | |
| 2017 | Motta Shiva Ketta Shiva | Kasi | |
| 2017 | Ippadai Vellum | | |
| 2017 | Ulkuthu | Sekar | |
| 2018 | Sketch | Bhaskar | |
| 2018 | Kadaikutty Singam | Adiyamaan (Safari) | |
| 2018 | Utharavu Maharaja | | |
| 2019 | Kanchana 3 | Raghava's brother | |
| 2020 | Darbar | Lily's cousin | |
| 2021 | Master | JD's friend | |
| 2022 | Naai Sekar | "Krodham" Ravi | |
| 2022 | Ward 126 | Kannan's neighbour | |
| 2023 | Varisu | Thambidurai | |
| 2023 | Ghosty | | |
| 2023 | Theerkadarishi | Srinivasan | |
| 2024 | Chiclets | Anusha's father | |
| 2024 | Guardian | Thyagu | |
| 2024 | Thiru.Manickam | Private bus driver | |
| 2025 | Baby and Baby | Manikkam | |
| 2025 | Mrs & Mr | Ravi | |
| 2026 | Sattendru Maarudhu Vaanilai | Hamumanth Reddy | |

=== Telugu ===
| Year | Film | Role | Notes |
|---|---|---|---|
| 1972 | Korada Rani | | Child artiste |
| 1975 | Bangara Manushulu | | Child artiste |
| 1975 | Pichodi Pelli | | Child artiste; uncredited |
| 1976 | Seetamma Santhanam | | Child artiste |
| 1979 | Toofan Mail | | Child artiste |
| 1983 | Chandi Chamundi | | Child artiste |
| 1984 | Railu Dopidi | | Child artiste |
| 1991 | Keechu Raallu | | |
| 1994 | Samaram | | |
| 1994 | Top Hero | Dasu's son | |
| 1995 | Ammaleni Puttillu | | |
| 1995 | Badilli | | |
| 1995 | Real Hero | | |
| 1996 | Maa Inti Aadapaduchu | | |
| 2001 | Snehamante Idera | Gautham | |
| 2002 | Seshu | Seshu's friend | |
| 2004 | Dharma | | |
| 2005 | 786 Khaidi Premakatha | | |
| 2009 | Pistha | Rambabu | |
| 2009 | Eenadu | Aravind Babu | |
| 2011 | Oosaravelli | Johnny | |
| 2012 | Rebel | Ajay | |
| 2015 | Tripura | Taddi Taapaarao | |
| 2023 | Narakasura | Inspector Sripathi | |
| 2024 | Chiclets | Anusha's father | Bilingual film |
| 2025 | Sasivadane | Raghava's father | |

=== Kannada ===
| Year | Film | Role | Notes |
|---|---|---|---|
| 2025 | Just Married | Shishupala | |

=== Television ===
- Anni
- Comedy Junction
- Pandian Stores
- Kelviyin Nayagane

Streaming television

- Label
- Mansion 24
