= Magudikkaran =

- VCD cover
- Directed by: Yaar Kannan
- Produced by: M. A. Subbiah; Lakshmi Subbiah
- Starring: R. Sarathkumar; Dev Anand; Devi; Chithra
- Cinematography: K. Sivaraj
- Edited by: Rajkeerthi
- Music by: Deva
- Production company: Sree Gayathre Cine Arts
- Release date: 25 November 1994
- Running time: 126 minutes
- Country: India
- Language: Tamil

Magudikkaran (transl. Snake Charmer) is a 1994 Indian Tamil-language drama film directed by Yaar Kannan. The film stars Sarathkumar in a guest appearance, while newcomers Dev Anand, Devi and Chithra play the lead roles. It was released on 25 November 1994.

== Cast ==
- R. Sarathkumar as Raja's father (guest appearance)
- Dev Anand as Raja
- Chithra as Thangam
- Devi
- Anandaraj
- Senthil
- K. Prabhakaran
- Vijay Krishnaraj
- Pradeep Jupiter
- Jeevan
- Nasim

== Soundtrack ==
The soundtrack was composed by Deva.

Song	Singer(s)	Lyrics
"Amma Paadiya" (Lady) I	Sunandha	Kalidasan
"Amma Paadiya" (Lady) II	Vani Jairam	Kalidasan
"Amma Paadiya" (Men)	S. P. Balasubrahmanyam	Kalidasan
"Ding Ding"	Mano, S. N. Surendar	Kalidasan
"Koo Kukku Kuyilu"	K. S. Chithra, Mano	Kalidasan
"Kutti Paaru"	Krishnaraj	Deva
"Pudhu Nagini"	Sunandha	Kalidasan
"Sendumalli"	Krishnaraj, Sangeetha Sajith	Yaar Kannan
