= Ninaivu Chinnam =

- Poster
- Directed by: Anu Mohan
- Written by: Anu Mohan
- Produced by: P. Chakrapani; Anuradha Mohan
- Starring: Prabhu; Radhika; Murali
- Cinematography: Rajarajan
- Edited by: Srinivas Krishnan
- Music by: Ilaiyaraaja
- Production company: Tamilnadu Movies
- Release date: 5 May 1989
- Country: India
- Language: Tamil

Ninaivu Chinnam (transl. Monument) is a 1989 Indian Tamil-language film directed by Anu Mohan. The film stars Prabhu and Radhika. It was released on 5 May 1989. Radhika won the Tamil Nadu State Film Award for Best Actress.

== Cast ==
- Prabhu as Rasappan
- Radhika as Bhagyam, Rasappan's wife
- Murali as Muthu (Muttikaal Raj)
- Chithra as Thangam
- Vijayakumar as Periya Pannai
- Goundamani as Kundalakesi
- Senthil as Aandava
- S. S. Chandran as Chinna Pannai
- Vijay Krishnaraj as Police Inspector
- Idichapuli Selvaraj as Head Constable Periyasamy
- Theni Kunjarammal
- A. K. S. as Postman

== Soundtrack ==
Soundtrack was composed by Ilaiyaraaja.

Song	Singers	Lyrics
"Yele Ilankiliye"	P. Susheela	Ilaiyaraaja
"Vaikasi Masthula"	S. P. Balasubrahmanyam, K. S. Chithra	Gangai Amaran
"Soruthinnu"	Malaysia Vasudevan, Senthil	Gangai Amaran
"Oorukulla Unna"	K. S. Chithra, Malaysia Vasudevan	Gangai Amaran
"Oorellam Thoonguthu"	K. S. Chithra	Piraisoodan
"Singara Cheemaiyile"	Ilaiyaraaja	Ilaiyaraaja

== Reception ==
P. S. S. of Kalki praised the acting of Prabhu, Radhika, Goundamani-Senthil's humour, music and cinematography though he was critical of loopholes in the plot and concluded praising for making a film with a social touch pointing out at some corrupt policemen being responsible for anti-social activities.
