= Witness (1995 film) =

Tamil language film

- Directed by: Thakkali Srinivasan
- Written by: Thakkali Srinivasan
- Starring: Nizhalgal Ravi; Gautami; Aamani; Raghuvaran; Suresh
- Cinematography: Dayal Osho
- Edited by: K. S. Karthikeyan
- Music by: Songs: Premi Seeni; Background Score: Manachanallur Giridharan
- Production company: T. G. F. Media Systems LTD
- Release date: 14 July 1995
- Running time: 110 minutes
- Country: India
- Language: Tamil

Witness is a 1995 Indian Tamil-language thriller film directed by Thakkali Srinivasan. The film stars Nizhalgal Ravi, Gautami, Aamani, Raghuvaran and Suresh, with J. Livingston, Thakkali Srinivasan, Chinni Jayanth and Baby Sowmya playing supporting roles. It was released on 14 July 1995.

== Plot ==
A serial killer targeting prostitutes goes on a murdering rampage in Chennai. The bodies of three prostitutes were discovered by the police, but there were no signs of sexual assault. The police inspector Vikram (Nizhalgal Ravi) takes charge of the case. Dhanasekhar and Ashok are two sub-inspectors who are put onto the case to assist Vikram. A fourth victim, a prostitute, is then found murdered in a hotel room. Luckily, Vikram's girlfriend Uma (Aamani), a journalist, took a picture of the presumed serial killer along with the fourth victim and show it to Vikram.

Vikram continues his investigation and discovers that the presumed serial killer, Niranjan (J. Livingston), is wanted by the Mumbai police. Niranjan went to jail several times for forgery. According to the information collected by the police informants, Niranjan will be at a nightclub for a special event. Vikram with his assistants finally catch Niranjan, but during the fight, Dhanasekhar has been wounded severely. At the court, Niranjan confesses that he had killed only one prostitute. That night, the prostitute discovered weapons in his suitcase and fearing that she will call the police, he killed her. Niranjan denies killing the other prostitutes, but the public prosecutor Priya (Gautami) and Vikram prove otherwise. The court has sentenced Niranjan with a death penalty. Days passed, and the murders of prostitutes continued in Chennai. Vikram and Priya realize that they have made a big mistake.

Priya tells to Vikram that a similar case happened a few years ago in Madurai. A serial killer murdered seven prostitutes, but the case is still unsolved. Priya's husband Ramesh (Raghuvaran) and brother Suresh (Suresh), who were police officers, investigated on these murders. One night, Ramesh told Priya that he found a shred of conclusive evidence. He and Suresh immediately took the police jeep to catch the serial killer. Later that night, they died in a car accident. Vikram starts looking into the Madurai's rape case and finds out that someone changed the post-mortem report of Ramesh and Suresh. Ramesh and Suresh did not die in the car accident, but they were killed by the serial killer.

The police officer Ashok then reveals to Uma that he is the serial killer. In the past, Ashok's mother (K. S. Jayalakshmi) was a prostitute, and Ashok could not bear the fact that his mother slept with other men for money, so he killed her at the age of eight. Ashok then became a police officer and continued his murdering rampage. He closed the cases in which he was involved before anyone even notices. After confessing everything, Ashok strangles Uma and she faints. Vikram later arrests him for murdering Uma, and Ashok's lawyer Srinivasan (Thakkali Srinivasan) defends him. Uma, who was supposed to be dead, survived. She arrives at the court and reveals that Ashok tried to kill her that night. The court judge postpones the judgment for the next hearing. If Uma testifies against Ashok and tells everything at the court, Ashok will be sentenced to life imprisonment. Srinivasan then advises Ashok to escape from police custody. Ashok manages to escape from the police. The court orders the police department to catch the serial killer Ashok dead or alive. Afterward, Vikram and the police department surround him, and Ashok is gunned down by Priya.

== Cast ==
- Nizhalgal Ravi as Vikram
- Gautami as Priya
- Aamani as Uma
- Raghuvaran as Ramesh, Priya's husband
- Suresh as Suresh, Priya's brother
- J. Livingston as Niranjan
- Thakkali Srinivasan as Srinivasan
- Chinni Jayanth as Musthafa
- Delhi Ganesh as Doctor
- Baby Sowmya as Chithra
- Prasanna Kumar as Manmadha Rajan
- K. S. Jayalakshmi as Ashok's mother
- Indra Devi as a prostitute
- Disco Shanti as a prostitute
- Silk Smitha in a special appearance

== Soundtrack ==
The soundtrack were composed by Premi-Seeni, with lyrics written by Muthu Bharathi.

Song	Singer(s)	Duration
"Kannil Oru Minnal"	S. P. Balasubrahmanyam, K. S. Chithra	4:17
"Naan Unnai Than"	K. S. Chithra	3:49
"Vatham Kollai"	Mano	0:57

== Reception ==
Thulasi of Kalki wrote that every scene is perfectly crafted to keep the viewers on the edge of their seats, but there are some hiccups. Thulasi added that some scenes seemed to be repeated, but the director should be thanked for trying out something new.
