= Ajay Rathnam =

Indian actor

- Occupation: Actor
- Years active: 1989-present
- Spouse: Sangeeta
- Children: 2

Ajay Rathnam is an Indian actor who has worked predominantly in Tamil films and serials apart from a few Telugu, Malayalam, Hindi and Kannada films. He is known for his supporting and negative roles and has acted in over 300 movies. Standing at 6 ft 4 in (193 cm), Rathnam is one of the tallest actors in Tamil cinema.

== Career ==
Rathnam made his acting debut with the horror film Naalai Manithan (1989) in which he played a psycho. He has appeared in one episode of the TV serial Marmadesam (Vidathu Karuppu).

== Other works ==
His other side is seen as a motivational trainer and has transformed lives of thousands of children under his academy "Stone to Diamond". Rathnam has been an abettor conducting motivational seminars for the students at various colleges. In 2018, he launched his badminton academy named "V Square" in Chennai. In 2019, he launched "V Square" Sports Arena in Mogappair.

== Personal life ==
His son Dheeraj Vishnu Rathnam is also an actor who made his debut with Arivazhagan's Aarathu Sinam (2016).

== Filmography ==
=== Tamil films ===
Year	Title	Role	Notes
1989	Naalai Manithan	John	credited as Ajay
1989	Thiruppu Munai	Manimudi	
1990	Madurai Veeran Enga Saami		
1990	Adhisaya Manithan	John	
1990	Chatriyan	John Swaminathan	
1990	Avanga Namma Ooru Ponnunga		
1991	Dharma Durai	Ajay	
1991	Thaiyalkaran		Guest appearance
1991	Nanbargal	Police Inspector	
1991	Kaaval Nilayam	Andhavar's son	
1991	Iravu Sooriyan		
1991	Gunaa	Inspector Moovendhar	
1992	Pandithurai	Rudramani	
1992	Singaravelan		
1992	Thevar Magan	Inspector S. Maruthupandi	
1993	Kalaignan		
1993	Minmini Poochigal	Police Officer	
1993	Vedan	Ajay	
1993	Gentleman	Rathnam	
1993	Udan Pirappu		
1993	Thiruda Thiruda	Ashok	
1993	Airport		
1994	Veera	Ratnavelu	
1994	Kaadhalan	Ajay	
1994	Honest Raj	Muthiah	
1994	Adharmam		
1994	Pandiyanin Rajyathil		
1995	En Pondatti Nallava	Police inspector	
1995	Mayabazaar 1995		
1995	Kuruthipunal	RPG expert shooter	
1996	Mahaprabhu		
1996	Irattai Roja		
1996	Indian	Freedom Fighter	
1996	Minor Mappillai	'Challenge' Sankaralingam	
1997	Ullaasam	Palpandi	
1997	Suryavamsam	Rajalingam	
1997	Pagaivan	Police inspector	
1997	Nerrukku Ner	Kachiram	
1997	Ratchagan	Mithran	
1997	Rettai Jadai Vayasu	Jeeva	
1998	Ulavuthurai	Ajay	
1998	Bhagavath Singh		
1998	Kaathala Kaathala	Williamson	
1998	Aasai Thambi		
1998	Urimai Por		
1999	Ullathai Killathe	Vinky	
1999	Periyanna		
1999	Annan Thangachi	Yashoda's brother	
1999	Mugam		
1999	Nesam Pudhusu	Vasanthi's cousin	
2000	Rhythm	Ajay	
2001	Nageswari	Devi's husband	
2001	Asathal	Jayaraj	
2001	Citizen	AC Krishnamoorthy	
2001	Shahjahan		
2002	Devan	Police officer	
2002	En Mana Vaanil	Police officer	
2002	Namma Veetu Kalyanam	Police officer	
2003	Paarai	Sub-Inspector	
2003	Indru	Superior officer	
2003	Diwan		
2003	Ottran	Saran	
2003	Thirumalai	Traffic police officer	
2003	Nadhi Karaiyinile		
2004	Varnajalam	ACP Prabhakaran	
2004	Vaanam Vasappadum	Police inspector	
2004	Vasool Raja MBBS	Medicine professor	
2004	Arasatchi		
2005	Aayudham		
2005	Sukran	Public Proscecutor Ramanujam	
2005	Kadhal FM	Principal	
2005	6'2	Krishnamurthy	
2005	Neeye Nijam	Police inspector	
2005	Selvam	Jyothy's father	
2006	Sudesi	Government Officer	
2006	Vanjagan	Chinrasu	
2006	Perarasu	Inspector Azhagappan	
2006	E		
2007	Pokkiri	Police Inspector	
2007	Agaram	Police commissioner	
2007	Parattai Engira Azhagu Sundaram		
2007	Periyar		
2007	Malaikottai		
2008	Pachai Nirame	Santhanapandian	
2008	Thozha		
2008	Theeyavan	Police Inspector	
2009	Satrumun Kidaitha Thagaval	Police Inspector	
2010	Thairiyam		
2010	Theeradha Vilaiyattu Pillai	Moneylender	
2010	Singam	Inspector General	
2011	Sattapadi Kutram	Police officer	
2012	Mayanginen Thayanginen	Kalivaradhan	
2012	Maattrraan	Ajay Rathnam	
2012	Nanban	Panchavan Pariventhan's father	Cameo appearance
2013	Thillu Mullu	Janani No. 2's father	
2014	Jigarthanda	Police officer	
2014	Poriyaalan	Banker	
2014	Bramman		
2015	Thani Oruvan	Superintendent of Police	
2015	Apoorva Mahaan		
2015	Puli		
2015	En Vazhi Thani Vazhi		
2015	Yatchan	Police officer	
2015	Uttama Villain	King Sadayavarman	
2015	Enakkul Oruvan		
2016	Wagah		
2016	Mudinja Ivana Pudi		
2017	Senjittale En Kadhala	Veera's father	
2017	Mangalapuram		
2017	Thupparivaalan	Police Chief	
2017	Spyder	Inspector Gokulnath	
2017	Kalathur Gramam		
2017	Thittivasal	Vanjinathan	
2018	Tamizh Padam 2	King Adhiyamaan	
2019	Goko Mako	Ajay Rathnam	
2022	Diary		
2023	Kodai	Anandan	
2025	Madha Gaja Raja	Pedha Perumal	
2025	Ten Hours	Divya's father	
2025	Red Flower		
2025	Theeyavar Kulai Nadunga	Church Father	

=== Telugu films ===
Year	Title	Role
1995	Aadaalla Majaka	
1996	Drohi	RPG expert shooter
1997	Master	Henchman
1998	Auto Driver	Nagaraj
2003	Ee Abbai Chala Manchodu	Vivekananda's father
2004	Adavi Ramudu	
2006	Naidu LLB	
2013	Satya 2	Sambasiva Rao "Samba"
2015	Malini & Co.	
2016	Dhruva	Ishika's father
2017	Spyder	Inspector Gokulnath
2019	Sye Raa Narasimha Reddy	Malla Reddy
2023	Ravanasura	Chief Minister
2023	Hidimba	Thilak
2024	Raajadhani Files	
2024	Mr. Bachchan	
2025	Karmanye Vadhikaraste	
2025	Mass Jathara	SP Devadas

=== Malayalam films ===
Year	Title	Role
1994	Vishnu	Guru dada
1994	Pidakkozhi Koovunna Noottandu	Dugluss
1994	Sainyam	Terrorist
1995	Hijack	
1995	Parvathy Parinayam	Aniyan Thirumeni
1999	Jananaayakan	Kuppuswami
2005	Bharatchandran IPS	Kala Purohit
2006	Pathaaka	Wincent Mozes
2009	Kerala Varma Pazhassi Raja	Subeidhar Cheran
2014	Little Superman	

=== Other language films ===
Year	Title	Role	Language	Notes
1992	Mera Dil Tere Liye	Police Inspector	Hindi	credited as R. Ajay
1997	Virasat	Police Inspector	Hindi	
2009	KA-99 B-333		Kannada	
2013	Madras Cafe	Anna Bhaskaran	Hindi	

== Television ==
Year	Serial	Role	Channel
1995	Chinna China Aasai - Minnal		
1997	Ragasiyam	Raghu (Police officer)	Sun TV
1997–1998	Vidathu Karuppu	Karuppannasamy Kadavul	Sun TV
2000–2001	Chithi	Yogi	Sun TV
2001	Ramany vs Ramany Part II	Radhakrishnan	Raj TV
2001	Amma	Sanjay	Sun TV
2002–2005	Annamalai	Anbalagan	Sun TV
2002–2004	Udhayam		Sun TV
2003	Tharkappu Kalai Theeratha		Sun TV
2006	Penn		Sun TV
2008–2009	Arasi	Vishwanathan	Sun TV
2007–2008	Porantha Veeda Puguntha Veeda		Sun TV
2008–2009	Gokulathil Seethai		Kalaignar TV
2009–2010	Karunamanjari		Raj TV
2009-	Dhayam		Kalaignar TV
2010–2011	Soundaravalli		Jaya TV
2010–2011	Yamirukka Bayamen		Vijay TV
2011	Mun Jenmam	Anchor	Vijay TV
2012–2015	Sivasankari		Sun TV
2013–2014	Uravugal Sangamam		Raj TV
2013–2014	Nalla Neram		Zee Tamil
2014–2015	Thiru Mangalyam	Vijaykumar	Zee Tamil
2020-2022	Poove Unakkaga	Shivanarayanan	Sun TV
2021	Sathya 1	Special Appearance	Zee Tamil
2022	Sathya 2	Special Appearance	Zee Tamil
2022	Bharathi Kannamma	Special Appearance	Star Vijay
2022	Kanda Naal Mudhal	IG Ravi	Colors Tamil
2023–present	Pandian Stores 2	Muthuvel	Star Vijay
2024	Baakiyalakshmi	Muthuvel (Special appearance)	Star Vijay
2024–2025	Thangamagal	GK	Star Vijay
2024	Meenakshi Ponnunga	Karuppusamy (Special appearance)	Zee Tamil
2025	Parijatham	Vijayaraghavan (Special appearance)	Zee Tamil
2026	Karthigai Deepam	Sanmugam (Special appearance)	Zee Tamil
2026–present	Vaagai Sooda Vaa	Vasudevan	Zee Tamil
