= Chithra (actress) =

Indian actress (1965–2021)

- Born: 21 May 1965; Kochi, Kerala, India
- Died: 21 August 2021 (aged 56); Saligramam, Chennai, Tamil Nadu, India
- Other names: Shruti Chithra; Nallennai Chithra
- Occupation: Actress
- Years active: 1981–2020
- Spouse: Vijayaraghavan (m. 1990–2021)
- Children: 1

Chithra (21 May 1965 – 21 August 2021) was an Indian actress best known for her work in Malayalam and Tamil films. She had acted in more than 100 films. She acted along with Prem Nazir and Mohanlal in her first film Aattakalasam in 1983. She was nicknamed "Nallennai Chithra" because of the fame she attained with the advertisement of an oil company she had acted in.

== Personal life and death ==
She was born as the second of three children of Madhavan and Devi at Kochi in 1965. She has an elder sister Deepa and a younger sister, Divya. She studied at ICF Higher secondary school, Chennai. She studied until tenth grade and could not continue her studies since she became busy with movies by then.

She married Vijayaraghavan in 1990. They have a daughter, Mahalakshmi, born in 1992. She resided at Saligramam, Chennai with her family. She acted in Tamil serials. She died on 21 August 2021 in Chennai due to a sudden cardiac arrest.

== Partial filmography ==
=== Malayalam films ===
Year	Title	Role	Notes
1975	Kalyanappanthal		
1977	Anugraham	Student in the song	Uncredited role
1981	Valarthumrugangal	Girl in the circus	Uncredited role
1983	Aattakalasam	Marykutty	Debut film
1984	Sandarbham		
1984	Ivide Ingane	Rema	
1984	Anthassu		
1984	Paavam Poornima	Susheela	
1985	Makan Ente Makan		
1985	Ezhu Muthal Onpathu Vare		
1985	Ottayan		
1985	Katha Ithuvare	Soosie	
1985	Manya Mahajanangale	Vimala	
1985	Uyarum Njan Nadake	Rajani	
1985	Pathamudayam	Amminikutty	
1985	Aazhi		
1985	Vasantha Sena	Nandini	
1985	Oduvil Kittiya Vartha		
1985	Thozhil Allengil Jail		
1985	Kothi Theerumvare		
1985	Jwalanam		
1986	Atham Chithira Chothy		
1986	Kaveri		
1986	Nimishangal	Ravi's wife	
1986	Annoru Ravil	Gayathri	
1986	Panchagni	Sarada	
1986	Onnu Randu Moonnu	Club Dancer	
1986	Shobhraj	Ayisha	
1987	Kaiyethum Doorath	Veena	
1988	Mukthi	Jayasree Nair	
1989	Asthikal Pookkunnu	Rajamma	
1989	Prabhaatham Chuvanna Theruvil	Thulasi	
1989	Oru Vadakkan Veeragatha	Kunjnooli	
1990	Parampara	Mary Lawrence	
1990	Kalikkalam	Ramani	
1990	Ee Thanutha Veluppan Kalathu	Padma	
1990	Rajavazhcha	Amminikutty	
1990	Malayogom	Rosely	
1991	Aavanikunnile Kinnaripookkal		
1991	Kakkathollayiram	Radhika	
1991	Koodikazhcha	Mollykutty	
1991	Orutharam Randutharam Moonnutharam	Lekha	
1991	Irikku M.D. Akathundu	Sujatha	
1991	Nagarathil Samsara Vishayam	Susan	
1991	Kankettu	Shyama	
1991	Kadalorakkaattu	Cicily	
1991	Amaram	Chandrika	
1991	Parallel College	Sudha	
1991	Nayam Vyakthamakkunnu		
1992	Manthrikacheppu	Sabu's wife	
1992	Naadody	Susheela	
1992	Adhwaytham	Karthyani	
1992	Mahan	Beevi	
1993	Thalamura	Doctor	
1993	Ponnuchami	Kanakam	
1993	Ekalvyan	Hemambaram	
1993	Devaasuram	Subhadramma	
1993	Ammayane Sathyam	Margarette	
1993	Sowbhagyam		
1993	Patheyam	Padmini	
1994	Rudraksham	Doctor	
1994	Dollar	Thankamma	
1994	Kadal	Kochu Mary	
1994	Commissioner	Adv. Sreelatha Varma	
1994	Chief Minister K. R. Gowthami	Anitha	
1995	Special Squad	Alice	
1995	Saadaram	Malathi	
1995	Prayikkara Pappan	Sarasu	
1995	Chaithanyam	Sreedevi	
1996	Swarnakireedam		
1997	Ikkareyanente Manasam	Pankajakshi	
1997	Adivaram	Vijayamma Thamburatti	
1997	Rishyasringan	Molly teacher	
1997	Rajathanthram	Seethalakshmi	
1997	Aaraam Thampuran	Thottathil Meenakshi	
1998	Manthri Maalikayil Manasammatham	Jayakumari	
1998	Manthri Kochamma	Dr. Maheswari Warrier	
1998	Kallu Kondoru Pennu	Pankajam	
1999	Bharya Veettil Paramasukham	Puthooramvettil Durgadevi	
1999	Ustaad	Ambika	
1999	Mazhavillu	Kathreena	
2000	Mister Butler	Mrs. Vijayan	
2001	Censor		
2001	Soothradharan	Ranimma	
2002	Aabharanachaarthu		

=== Tamil films ===
Year	Title	Role	Notes
1975	Apoorva Raagangal		Child artist
1978	Aval Appadithan	Young Manju	Child artist
1981	Raja Paarvai	Sulochana	
1982	Auto Raja	Raja's sister	
1984	En Uyir Nanba	Santhi	
1986	Krodham	Subha	
1986	Rasigan Oru Rasigai	Remya	
1987	Chinna Poove Mella Pesu		
1987	Manathil Urudhi Vendum	Chitra	
1987	Oorkavalan	Mallika	
1988	En Thangachi Padichava	Lakshmi	
1989	Enga Veettu Deivam	Jancy	
1989	Valudhu Kalai Vaithu Vaa	Latchmi	
1989	Thalaippu Seithigal		
1989	Ninaivu Chinnam	Thangam	
1989	Manidhan Marivittan	Tamilarasi	
1989	Thiruppu Munai	Chitra	
1990	Ethir Kaatru	Geetha	
1990	Vellaiya Thevan	Pournamma	
1990	Adhisaya Manithan	Kousalya	
1990	Enakkoru Neethi		
1990	Engal Swamy Ayyappan		
1990	60 Naal 60 Nimidam	Asha	
1991	Naadu Adhai Naadu	Anjali	
1991	Putham Pudhu Payanam	Nurse	
1991	Cheran Pandian	Parimalam	
1991	Puthiya Natchathiram	Gaadha	
1992	Pondatti Rajyam	Bharathi's sister	
1992	Chinnavar	Ponni	
1993	Paarambariyam	Vimala	
1993	Pathini Penn		
1994	Veettai Paaru Naattai Paaru	Mrs. Vikramadityan	
1994	Magudikkaran	Thangam	
1994	Muthal Manaivi	Kannamma	
1994	Madhumathii	Rathi teacher	
1995	Periya Kudumbam	Shanthi	
1996	Gopala Gopala	Meenakshi	
1996	Rajali	Latchmi	
1996	Ilamai Rojakkal	Asha's mother	
2001	Kabadi Kabadi	Landlord mami	
2005	Kadhal Seiya Virumbu	Nithika's mother	
2020	Bell Bottom		
2020	En Sangathu Aala Adichavan Evanda	Deivanai	

=== Telugu films ===
Year	Title	Role	Notes
1981	Amavasya Chandrudu	Sulochana	
1983	Gaaju Bommalu	-	
1986	Padaharella Ammayi	Papai	
1988	Neti Swatantram	Baby	
1988	Indra Dhanassu	Aruna	
1988	Chattamtho Chadarangam	Bhanu	
2005	Preminchaka	Nikita's mother	

=== Kannada films ===
Year	Title	Role	Notes
1986	Sundara Swapnagalu	Kamala	
1988	Krishna Mechida Radhe	Radha	
1990	Ajay Vijay	Radha	

=== Hindi films ===
Year	Title	Role	Notes
1982	Razia		
1984	Ek Nai Paheli		

=== Television ===
- Manasi (Doordarshan Malayalam)
- Kaialavu Manasu (Sun TV) as Kanchana
- Asaigal
- Udhyogasthan
- Saariyum Illai Thappum Illai - Micro Thodar Macro Sinthanaigal
- Nagamma (Telugu) as Indrani
- Kanavarukaaga (Sun TV) as Arundhati
- Malargal (Sun TV) as Indira
