= Thiruppu Munai =

- Poster
- Directed by: Kalaivanan Kannadasan
- Written by: K. N. Lakshmanan
- Produced by: B. Kandaswami
- Starring: Karthik; Chithra
- Cinematography: G. Dhanapal
- Edited by: B. K. Mohan
- Music by: Ilaiyaraaja
- Production company: B. K. Enterprizes
- Release date: 3 November 1989
- Running time: 130 minutes
- Country: India
- Language: Tamil

Thiruppu Munai (transl. Turning Point) is a 1989 Tamil-language crime film directed by Kalaivanan Kannadasan. The film stars Karthik and Chithra. It was released on 3 November 1989.

== Plot ==
Sathyamoorthy, an honest politician, becomes the new Minister of Justice. Chakravarthy, a corrupted politician, who wants to be a minister feels ridiculous and tries to kill Sathyamoorthy but he fails each time.

Rajaram, a jobless graduate, comes to the city to find a job. He has a mother in his village and he has a lot of debts. There, he becomes friends with Pichandi, who is also a jobless graduate, and Chidambaram, a disabled family man. Sangeetha, Chakravarthy's niece, interviews Rajaram for a job and he passes it well. Rajaram is hired by Chakravarthy but Chakravarthy asks him to first charm Chitra, Sathyamoorthy's daughter. Rajaram tries to charm her and Chitra falls in love with him. Sathyamoorthy wants to see, his daughter's lover, Rajaram, so Chakravarthy gives him a flower bouquet with a bomb inside. Sathyamoorthy appreciates Rajaram and he gives the flower bouquet to Sathyamoorthy. Sathyamoorthy dies in the bomb blast. Rajaram is sentenced to life imprisonment and Pichandi to five years in prison.

Chakravarthy has succeeded to the minister post and he decides to kill the witnesses. Anand, the jailer, because of his corrupted services, becomes the sub-jailer. Vanchinathan, who looks exactly like Rajaram, is the new jailer. Manimudi, Chakravarthy's henchman, kills Pichandi under the command of Chakravarthy and Vanchinathan is sentenced to life imprisonment. Vanchinathan then escapes from the jail and with Chitra, they try to flee the innocent Rajaram. Later, Chidambaram and his wife are murdered by Chakravarthy's henchmen.

Finally, Rajaram and Vanchinathan kill Chakravarthy's henchmen. Chakravarthy is sentenced to life imprisonment, Rajaram and Chitra get married and Vanchinathan decides to bring up Chidambaram's son.

== Cast ==
- Karthik as Rajaram / Vanchinathan
- Chithra as Chithra
- Janagaraj as Pichandi
- Vagai Chandrasekhar as Chidambaram
- Vinu Chakravarthy as Chakravarthy
- J. V. Somayajulu as Sathyamoorthy
- Silk Smitha as Sangeetha
- Sabitha Anand as Chidambaram's wife
- Thyagu as Anand
- Ajay Rathnam as Manimudi
- Jai Ganesh in a guest appearance

== Soundtrack ==
The soundtrack was composed by Ilaiyaraaja. In early 2020, during the COVID-19 pandemic in India, a version of "Ammana Summa Illada" with rewritten lyrics spreading awareness about COVID-19, became viral.

| Song | Singer(s) | Lyrics | Length |
|---|---|---|---|
| "Adi Ye Pulla" | Mano, K. S. Chithra, Sunandha | Pulamaipithan | 4:33 |
| "Ammana Summa Illada" | Ilaiyaraaja | Ilaiyaraaja | 4:40 |
| "Ilamai Ithu" | Mano, K. S. Chithra | Gangai Amaran | 4:02 |
| "Oru Naal" | Mano, K. S. Chithra | Kalaivanan Kannadasan | 4:20 |

== Reception ==
P. S. S. of Kalki praised the performances of Karthik and other actors and Ilaiyaraaja's music but felt the director heavily messed up the climax.
