= Naalai Manithan =

1989 Tamil film directed by Velu Prabhakaran

- Poster
- Directed by: Velu Prabhakaran
- Written by: Velu Prabhakaran
- Produced by: Thakkali Srinivasan
- Starring: Prabhu; Amala; Ajay Rathnam
- Cinematography: Velu Prabhakaran
- Edited by: V. Chakrapani
- Music by: Premi–Srini
- Production company: Perfect Productions
- Release date: 14 January 1989
- Running time: 108 minutes
- Country: India
- Language: Tamil

Naalai Manithan (transl. The Man of Tomorrow) is a 1989 Indian Tamil-language science fiction action horror film directed by Velu Prabhakaran. The film stars Prabhu, Ajay Rathnam, Amala and Jaishankar. It is a remake of the American film Silent Rage (1982). The film was remade in Kannada as Manava 2022 (1997). A sequel named Adhisaya Manithan was released a year later.

== Plot ==
In 2008, Chennai, Dr. Shankar invents a drug which gives back life to the dead if injected within two hours of death. He along with Ramesh and Kanth, experiments the drug on the dead body of a man named John and finds it successful. Unknown to them, the drug induces side effects which makes the recipient immortal and, at the same time murderous. As such, John starts to kill people in the town, the city is soon flooded with murders.

While murdering a group of youngsters at a resort, John is arrested by police officer Vijay and his deputy Shekar. But he breaks out of the handcuffs, overpowers the other officers, forcing the officers to shoot him. Severely injured John is again transported to the hospital.

Kanth requests to Shankar to kill John, as he is a threat towards the society. Overhearing this, John escapes from the institute and follows Kanth to his home. John breaks into Kanth's home and the two fight. Despite shooting John several times and pushing him down a flight of stairs, Kanth is killed. Kanth's wife Shree returns home after shopping finds her husband's body and is killed by John as well. At the time, Shree's friend Preethi arrives there for a feast, which Shree had invited for Preethi's upcoming marriage with Vijay. Preethi discovers Shree and Kanth's corpses. But John flees as Vijay arrives at the place.

Shekar takes Preethi to the institute, unaware that John has also returned there to get treat his wounds. Realizing that the situation is out of control, Ramesh attempts to kill John by injecting him with an acid. But being immortal John kills Ramesh and even Shankar, who comes to cure John. John chases to kill Preethi. Where Shekar saves Preethi. John kills Shekar and follows to kill Preethi too. Vijay returns in time but finds Shekar dying. He also rescues Preethi from John, by shooting him, which makes John fell off the balcony.

But John revives and tries to kill Vijay. John hangs on to Vijay's car as Vijay and Preethi try to escape and climbs into its back window, forcing them to jump out. The car crashes and explodes, lighting John on fire. This burns him, but he jumps into a nearby lake and quickly recovers and attacks them. After some intense bloodshed and fight, Vijay defeats John by hitting him several times before throwing him into a nearby well. As John seems to be killed, Vijay leaves the place along with Preethi. However, deep in the well, John comes out from water, having survived.

== Cast ==
- Prabhu as Inspector Vijay
- Amala as Preethi
- Jaishankar as Dr. Shankar
- Thakkali Srinivasan as Dr. Kanth
- Jai Ganesh as Dr. Ramesh
- Ajay Rathnam as John
- Jayashree as Shree
- Janagaraj as Sergeant Shekar
- Senthamarai as Preethi's father

Cameo appearances

- Mohan as himself, the chief guest
- Disco Shanti as a dancer in the bar
- Livingston as himself, the TV presenter.

== Production ==
Naalai Manithan marked the directorial debut of Velu Prabhakaran, who also wrote the screenplay and served as cinematographer. Thakkali Srinivasan produced the film and also acted. Ajay Rathnam made his acting debut with this film.

== Soundtrack ==
Music was by Premi–Srini, with lyrics by Muthu Bharathi. The background music and re-recording was by Manachanallur Giridharan.

Song	Singer	Length
"Sangamathil Sangamein"	S. P. Balasubrahmanyam, K. S. Chithra	04:26
"Ye Solai Pookkalae"	Mano, S. P. Sailaja	03:54
"Manithanum"	Sirkazhi Sivachidambaram	03:48
"Punnagai Pothuma"	Vani Jairam	03:36
"Mele Mele Bode"	Mano	03:01

== Release and reception ==
Naalai Manithan was released on 14 January 1989. N. Krishnaswamy of The Indian Express wrote on 20 January 1989, "The murderous hunt is what the film is about, and such sequences are put together with crisp finesse. 2008 notwithstanding, Naalai Manithan is closer to what Cain did to Abel." P. S. S. of Kalki gave a negative review, saying that though the final scene teases a sequel, enough was enough.

== Sequel ==
The sequel Adhisaya Manithan was released in 1990, and was also directed by Prabhakaran.
