= En Thangai (1989 film) =

1989 film by A. Jagannathan

- Poster
- Directed by: A. Jagannathan
- Screenplay by: R. M. Veerappan
- Story by: Ramani
- Produced by: T. G. Thyagarajan; V. Thamilazhagan
- Starring: Arjun; Gautami
- Cinematography: Viswam Natraj
- Edited by: K. R. Krishnan
- Music by: S. A. Rajkumar
- Production company: Sathya Movies
- Release date: 16 June 1989
- Running time: 143 minutes
- Country: India
- Language: Tamil

En Thangai (transl. My sister) is a 1989 Indian Tamil-language film, directed by A. Jagannathan, starring Arjun and Gautami.

== Cast ==
- Arjun
- Gautami
- Vaishnavi
- S. S. Chandran
- Vinu Chakravarthy
- Nassar
- Charle

== Soundtrack ==
The music was composed by S. A. Rajkumar.

Song	Singers	Lyrics	Length
"Appan Kedakkaran"	S. P. Balasubrahmanyam, K. S. Chithra	Vaali	04:46
"Hey Beauty"	S. P. Balasubrahmanyam, K. S. Chithra	S. A. Rajkumar	04:47
"Madhuvin"	Uma Ramanan, Kalyan	Muthulingam	04:33
"Poovukkulle"	S. P. Balasubrahmanyam, K. S. Chithra	S. A. Rajkumar	04:56
"Vazhaiyum"	Sunandha	Vairamuthu	04:17

== Reception ==
P. S. S. of Kalki said it was an okay film with constant twists and turns without any slack even though some other characters were flimsy.
