= Udhavikku Varalaamaa =

- Poster
- Directed by: Gokula Krishnan
- Screenplay by: Gokula Krishnan
- Story by: G. Kavitha
- Produced by: M. Gafar
- Starring: Karthik; Devayani; Sangeetha; Anju Aravind
- Cinematography: Jayanan Vincent
- Edited by: K.R. Gowri Shankar; T.R. Sekar
- Music by: Sirpy
- Production company: Taaj International
- Release date: 16 January 1998
- Running time: 150 minutes
- Country: India
- Language: Tamil

Udhavikku Varalaamaa (transl. May I come for help?) is a 1998 Indian Tamil-language comedy film directed by Gokula Krishnan. The film stars Karthik, Devayani, Sangeetha and Anju Aravind, with Janagaraj, Pandiyan, Vadivukkarasi, Manivannan, Kovai Sarala and Jai Ganesh playing supporting roles. It was released on 16 January 1998 and failed at the box-office. This was Gokula Krishna's last film as director and continued as dialogue writer before his death in 2008 and also was his last collaboration with Karthik after Poovarasan and Muthu Kaalai.

== Plot ==
Muthurasu has come to the city to earn money to finance his mother's operation and asks for ideas from his friend Annamalai. To rent a place owned by a Brahmin couple, Muthurasu transforms himself into a Brahmin Pichumani and also falls in love with Mythili, the couple's daughter. Getting a job at a company owned by a devout Muslim makes him put on the garb of Hussein, a Muslim. Things get more complicated when an unsafe situation makes him take on the role of Pastor James, a Christian and Stella, his secretary in the office where he works as Hussein, falls in love with him.

== Cast ==
- Karthik as Muthurasu / Pichumani / Hussein / Pastor James
- Devayani as Mythili
- Sangeetha (credited as Rasiga) as Stella
- Anju Aravind as Aisha
- Janagaraj as Annamalai
- Pandiyan as Paalrasu
- Vadivukkarasi as Mutharasu's mother
- Manivannan as Mythili's father
- Kovai Sarala as Mythili's mother
- Jai Ganesh as Aisha's father
- Kaka Radhakrishnan as Hussein's father
- J. Lalitha as Stela's mother
- Shakeela as an item number

== Soundtrack ==
The music was composed by Sirpy, with lyrics written by Palani Bharathi.

Song	Singer(s)	Duration
"Thottu Thottu"	Mano, Swarnalatha	4:23
"Ennodu Edho"	Mano, Sujatha Mohan	4:06
"Salakku Salakku"	Mano, Swarnalatha	4:54
"Neethan Neethan"	Deva	4:16
"Singapore"	Krishna Raj, Devie Neithiyar	4:00

== Reception ==
The film was released on 15 January 1998 for Pongal. D. S. Ramanujam wrote for The Hindu, "The director Gokul Krishna, who has written the screenplay and dialogue has created several situations, some of which are good while others are highly cinematic". He added, "Sirpi draws a blank again with his music while Jayanen Vicent's camera work is pleasant". A writer from Screen called the film "a total farce which taxes the patience of the viewers. Karthik plays a conman, who woos three girls posing as a Hindu, Muslim and Christian, but fails to impress in all three". The film failed at the box office, and distributors who suffered losses demanded Karthik to compensate them as he was reported to have financed the entire film, despite Gafar being credited as producer.
