= Ninne Preethisuve =

- Theatrical release poster
- Directed by: Om Prakash Rao
- Written by: BA Madhu (dialogues)
- Story by: Rajakumaran
- Based on: Nee Varuvai Ena (Tamil)
- Produced by: K Meharunnisa Rehaman; K Musthafa
- Starring: Ramesh Aravind; Shiva Rajkumar; Raasi
- Cinematography: Anaji Nagaraj
- Edited by: S. Manohar
- Music by: Rajesh Ramanath
- Production company: Oscar Films
- Release date: 9 August 2002
- Running time: 152 minutes
- Country: India
- Language: Kannada

Ninne Preethisuve (transl. I Love You) is a 2002 Indian Kannada-language romantic drama film directed by Om Prakash Rao and produced by Oscar Films. The film features Ramesh Aravind, and Raasi in lead roles with Shiva Rajkumar in extended cameo. The film was a remake of director Rajakumaran's Tamil film Nee Varuvai Ena (1999).

== Cast ==
- Ramesh Aravind as Kalyan
- Shiva Rajkumar as Major Srinivas (extended cameo)
- Raasi as Meghamala
- Sharan as Rajesh
- Lokesh (guest appearance)
- Mukhyamantri Chandru as Kalyan's father
- Sihi Kahi Chandru
- Srilalitha
- Chitra Shenoy
- Jayalakshmi as Kalyan's mother
- Shailaja Joshi
- Dingri Nagaraj as Thimma
- Sadhu Kokila
- Shivaji Rao Jadhav
- M. S. Karanth
- Baby Raksha

== Production ==
The film was launched at the Sriramanjeneya Temple in Hanumanthnagar, Bangalore.

== Soundtrack ==
The soundtrack of the film was composed by Rajesh Ramanath with the lyrics by K. Kalyan. All the tunes from Tamil film is retained while the song "Olave Nanna Olave" is based on the song "Nilave Vaan Nilave" from Maayi.

Track listing
| No. | Title | Lyrics | Singer(s) | Length |
|---|---|---|---|---|
| 1. | "Prema Patra" | K. Kalyan | Rajesh Krishnan, K. S. Chithra |
| 2. | "Kogileya Haadu" | K. Kalyan | Rajesh Krishnan, K. S. Chithra |
| 3. | "Gudi Ganteyu" | K. Kalyan | Rajesh Krishnan, K. S. Chithra |
| 4. | "Olave Nanna Olave" | K. Kalyan | Rajesh Krishnan, K. S. Chithra |
| 5. | "Ninna Preethiya" | K. Kalyan | Rajesh Krishnan, K. S. Chithra |
| 6. | "Nanna Preethiya Devathe" | K. Kalyan | Rajesh Krishnan, K. S. Chithra |

== Reception ==
A critic from Viggy wrote that "However, 'Ninne Preethisuve' is a genuine attempt to mean different at least in the climax and story line". A critic from indiainfo.com wrote, "Overall a good remake movie".
