= Kadhaludan =

- DVD cover
- Directed by: Rajakumaran
- Written by: Rajakumaran
- Produced by: Devayani
- Starring: Murali; Devayani; Abbas
- Cinematography: Vijay Milton
- Edited by: V. Jaisankar
- Music by: S. A. Rajkumar
- Production company: Raade Films
- Release date: 14 February 2003
- Running time: 150 minutes
- Country: India
- Language: Tamil

Kadhaludan (transl. With Love) is a 2003 Indian Tamil-language romantic drama film directed by Rajakumaran. The film stars Murali, Devayani and Abbas. The film, produced by Devayani, was released on 14 February 2003, coinciding with Valentine's Day.

== Plot ==
Kalyan, a talented magician, works with his friend and assistant Ramesh. Kalyan's mother insists him to get married soon and she finds a bride for him. Kalyan has a different view on marriage and he first wants to know all about his bride. With the marriage broker and Ramesh, Kalyan leaves his house to see his supposed bride.

The supposed bride Kavitha has a father Manickavasagar. Kalyan then stalks her everywhere she goes. Kalyan slowly begins to fall under her spell and he even helps them to settle their debts.

One day, Kavitha attempts to commit suicide because her lover's father arranges a marriage for her lover. Durai and Kavitha were in love. Although Manickavasagar accepted for the marriage, Durai's father asked an expensive dowry. Durai promises to Kavitha that he will pay her dowry for the marriage and he then leaves her village.

Kavitha waits until now for Durai's return. Concerned about her past, Kalyan decides to find Durai. Thereafter, the old man Ajmal tells to Kalyan that Durai is dead. Kalyan and Ramesh have no other choice than to lie to Kavitha concerning Durai. Later, Kalyan reveals to Manickavasagar that Durai is dead and that he is the real groom.

Durai, who supposed to be dead, comes back to get marry with Kavitha. Actually, Durai had a friend with the same name who died a few years ago. Kavitha and Durai get married without their parents' blessing but with the help of Kalyan. Kalyan, who cannot forget Kavitha, decides to stay a bachelor for a moment.

== Cast ==
- Murali as Kalyan
- Devayani as Kavitha
- Abbas as Durai
- Ramesh Khanna as Ramesh
- T. S. Raghavendra as Manickavasagar
- Radha Ravi as Durai's father
- Vinu Chakravarthy as Pannayar
- Vaiyapuri as a marriage broker
- Karunas as Durai
- Manivannan as Ajmal
- Sathyapriya as Kalyan's mother
- Anandaraj in a guest appearance
- Madhan Bob in a guest appearance
- Chaplin Balu
- Thadi Balaji

== Soundtrack ==
The soundtrack was composed by S. A. Rajkumar.

Song	Singer(s)	Lyrics	Duration
"Ithuvarai Yarum"	Srinivas, Kalpana Raghavendar	Viveka	5:10
"Pookalin Kathinile"	Karthik, Sujatha	Viveka	4:04
"Uchi Kilaiyilae"	Kalpana, Srinivas	Viveka	5:15
"Unnai Thinam"	Prasanna, Kalpana, P. Unni Krishnan	Viveka	5:10
"Vaazhga Pallandu" (Female)	Gopika Poornima	Amuthabharathi	4:47
"Vaazhga Pallandu" (Male)	S. P. Balasubrahmanyam	Amuthabharathi	4:47

== Critical reception ==
Sify said, "The plot is idiotic, as director Rajakumaran has tried to rehash his earlier film Nee Varuvai Ena." and described the film as tedious. Malathi Rangarajan from The Hindu described the film as a neat family drama, adding, "The screenplay is hampered mainly by lengthy, meandering dialogue that proves tiresome" and that "For Murali the role of a soft, caring hero is a cakewalk". Krishna Chidambaram of Kalki wrote an average mark can be given to Rajakumaran for making the film with emphasis on the story and no huge size nonsense. Malini Mannath of Chennai Online wrote, "In this triangular love story set in a rural ambience, the director has etched the three characters finely, and given each his space. The narration moves fairly smoothly most of the time, only, there is a sense of deja vu throughout. The film has shades of the director’s earlier film ‘Nee Varuvai Ena’. While the final scene reminds one of a Vikraman film ending. Some of the lines are meaningful, but then it becomes a little too sermonising at times".
