= Kai Kodukkum Kai =

1984 film by J. Mahendran

- Theatrical release poster
- Directed by: Mahendran
- Screenplay by: Mahendran
- Story by: Eeswarachandra
- Produced by: Vijayakumar; R. Vijayachandran
- Starring: Rajinikanth; Revathi
- Cinematography: Ashok Kumar
- Edited by: B. Lenin; V. T. Vijayan
- Music by: Ilaiyaraaja
- Production company: Sri Raghavendraas
- Release date: 15 June 1984
- Country: India
- Language: Tamil

Kai Kodukkum Kai (transl. The Hand that Helps) is a 1984 Indian Tamil-language film written and directed by Mahendran, starring Rajinikanth and Revathi. It is an extended version of Munithayi written by Eeswarachandra – the third segment of the 1976 Kannada anthology film Katha Sangama. Rajnikanth, who played the antagonist in Munithayi, played the lead role in this film. The film was produced by Vijayakumar and R. Vijayachandran. It was released on 15 June 1984.

== Plot ==
Kaalimuthu marries Seetha, the girl he loves after much denial from his elder brother. Seetha is blind and is raped by a Pannaiyar who has a weakness for women and addiction to sex. The Pannaiyar, even though married, lusts after looking at Seetha and rapes her in the absence of Kaalimuthu, her husband. The climax is an interesting twist as to what happens when Kaalimuthu decides to forgive the Pannaiyar for his crime.

== Cast ==
- Rajinikanth as Kaalimuthu
- Revathi as Seetha
- Rajyalakshmi as Mangamma
- Ranganath as Periyapannai
- V. S. Raghavan as Kaalimuthu's brother
- Sowcar Janaki as Kaalimuthu's sister-in-law
- Y. G. Mahendran
- Poornam Viswanathan
- Thengai Srinivasan
- Chinni Jayanth
- Kumarimuthu
- Vijayalakshmi
- Bayilvan Ranganathan

== Production ==
Actor Vijayakumar decided to produce a film with Rajinikanth as the lead actor. Rajinikanth suggested Mahendran be the director. The film was an extended version of Munithayi, the third segment of the 1975 Kannada anthology film Katha Sangama. Rajinikanth, who played the antagonist in Munithayi, played the lead in this film. Mahendran wrote the screenplay with slight changes in the script like having a different ending. When Revathi was approached by Mahendran to portray the blind girl Seetha, she accepted after being impressed by the script. In preparation for portraying the character, she walked around her house blindfolded. This is the feature film debut of Chinni Jayanth.

Revathi refused to expose her skin for the scene where Seetha is raped; respecting her wishes, Mahendran shot the scene "with care", prioritising Revathi's comfort. Vijayakumar claimed he was not satisfied with the climax as he felt fans would not accept Seetha getting raped, but Mahendran refused to change the climax that the original film had. Mahendran, in his autobiography Cinemavum Naanum, countered that the producer and financier insisted to have that scene in the end and was forced to keep it. A duet sequence had to be included in the film due to pressure from others.

== Soundtrack ==
The soundtrack and score were composed by Ilaiyaraaja. The song "Azaghu Sirichathilay" song is not available in the original EP record.

Track listing
No.	Title	Lyrics	Singer(s)	Length
1.	"Thaazham Poove Vaasam"	Pulamaipithan	S. P. Balasubrahmanyam, S. Janaki	4:13
2.	"Paattha Padichapulle"	Gangai Amaran	S. Janaki, Saibaba	4:08
3.	"Kannukkulle Yaaro"	Na. Kamarasan	S. P. Sailaja, P. Susheela	4:20
4.	"Aaththa Peththaale"	Vaali	Malaysia Vasudevan	4:28
5.	"Azaghu Sirichathilay"	Madukkur Kannan	Ilaiyaraaja	4:03
Total length:				21:12

== Release and reception ==
Kai Kodukkum Kai was released on 15 June 1984. Ananda Vikatan said the film "teetered between Rajini-ism and Mahendran-ism". Similar comments were made by Kalki. The film ran for over 100 days in theatres became successful venture.

== Bibliography ==
- Mahendran (2013) [2004]. சினிமாவும் நானும் [Cinema and I] (in Tamil). Karpagam Publications. OCLC 54777094.
- Ramachandran, Naman (2014) [2012]. Rajinikanth: The Definitive Biography. New Delhi: Penguin Books. ISBN 978-0-14-342111-5.
