= Ninne Premistha =

2000 Telugu-language romance film

- Theatrical release poster
- Directed by: R. R. Shinde
- Written by: Story: Rajakumaran; Screenplay: R. R. Shinde; Dialogues: Trivikram Srinivas
- Based on: Nee Varuvai Ena (Tamil)
- Produced by: R. B. Choudary
- Starring: Nagarjuna; Srikanth; Soundarya; Rajendra Prasad
- Cinematography: Shyam K Naidu
- Edited by: Marthand K. Venkatesh
- Music by: S. A. Rajkumar
- Production company: Super Good Films
- Release date: 14 September 2000
- Running time: 160 minutes
- Country: India
- Language: Telugu

Ninne Premistha (transl. I will Love You!) is a 2000 Indian Telugu-language romance film, produced by R. B. Choudary on the Super Good Films banner, directed by R. R. Shinde. It stars Nagarjuna, Srikanth, Soundarya, and Rajendra Prasad. The music was composed by S. A. Rajkumar, dialogues were written by Trivikram Srinivas and cinematography was by Shyam K Naidu. It is the Telugu remake of the 1999 Tamil film Nee Varuvai Ena (1999). Despite the mixed reviews, the film was a box office hit.

== Plot ==
The film begins with a young charm. Kalyan, a bank officer, spends his time dreaming of who his would-be spouse is. Anyhow, he receives many refusals for his parents' intercaste marriage. At that time, Kalyan gains promotion and proceeds to a beautiful village, Pattiseema West Godavari District. Midway, his bus meets with a terrible accident, and he loses his eyesight. After 3 months, Kalyan recoups and retrieves to take up his job accompanying his best friend, Ramesh. Whereat, he is acquainted with a charming girl, Meghamala, his neighbor, who showers hospitality & affection beyond relation, which attracts him to her. All of her shared contagious feelings that she loved him. So, with Ramesh's aid, Kalyan tries various means to pursue her, which ends hilariously. One day, he confirms it by accidentally noticing her diary, which writes the imposition of I Love You and forwards the bridal connections. Startlingly, Meghamala rejects his proposal, divulging her eternal love for Srinivas.

Indeed, Srinivas, Indian Army Major their elders fix their matchmaking during his vacation. Before it, the two cross paths, fall in love, and get engaged. Srinivas seeks Meghamala to propose to him, but she is quiet and shy. Suddenly, Srinivas receives an emergency call from the headquarters and moves, pausing the nuptial. Meghamala joins him at the railway station to fulfill his proposed wish. Amidst, Srinivas became the same accident victim, where Kalyan lost his vision to whom Srinivas's eyes were the transplant. Now, Meghamala proclaims to Kalyan that her intention of intimacy with him is to view his eyes. Since she regrets failing to propose, Srinivas Meghamala is writing an imposition and declaring that she will remain single. Still, Kalyan stands firm. Hence, Meghamala tactically arranges Kalyan's wedlock with a benevolent Srilakshmi, of which he is unbeknownst. Though Meghamala visits the wedding, Kalyan's parents expel her. The next day, she is surprised to see Kalyan, her opposite, calling off the splice and knitting Ramesh with Srilakshmi. At last, Kalyan affirms that he, too, remains single. Finally, the movie ends lovely with Meghamala taking care of Kalyan's eyes, and he is waiting for her love with hope.

== Cast ==
- Srikanth as Kalyan
- Soundarya as Meghamala
- Nagarjuna Akkineni as Major Srinivas
- Rajendra Prasad as Ramesh
- K. Chakravarthy as Bullabai, Meghamala’s father
- Chandra Mohan as Shankar Rao, Kalyan’s father
- Brahmanandam as Lottery Winner
- Ali as Servant
- MS Narayana as Dattudu
- Tanikella Bharani as Bank manager
- Nutan Prasad as Village head
- Chalapathi Rao as Srihari Rao, Srinivas’s father
- Sivaji Raja as Nukalu
- LB Sriram as Bullitata
- Ananth Babu as Mallasi Veerandranath
- Kallu Chidambaram as Budabukhalavadu
- Gadiraju Subba Rao as Washerman
- Mukku Raju
- Jenny as School master
- Ravali as Srilakshmi (Cameo Appearance)
- Annapurna as Srinivas's mother
- Sangeetha as Kalyan's mother
- Vinniradai Nirmala as Meghamala's mother
- Master Tanish
- Baby Saharik

== Soundtrack ==
Ninne Premistha

Film score by S. A. Rajkumar
- Released: 2000
- Genre: Soundtrack
- Length: 27:04
- Label: Aditya Music
- Producer: S. A. Rajkumar

S. A. Rajkumar chronology
Pelli Sambandham (2000)	Ninne Premistha (2000)	Priyamaina Neeku (2001)

The music was composed by S. A. Rajkumar. All songs were retained from the original except for "Prema Endukani", which was reused from "Nilave Vaan Nilave" from Maayi (2000). The music was released by Aditya Music.

No.	Title	Lyrics	Singer(s)	Length
1.	"Oka Devata (Male)"	Venigalla Rambabu	S. P. Balasubrahmanyam	4:44
2.	"Prema Endukani"	ES Murthy	Rajesh, K.S.Chithra	4:32
3.	"Koila Pata"	Sirivennela Sitaramsastri	S. P. Balasubrahmanyam, K.S.Chithra	4:06
4.	"Gudi Gantalu"	Ghantadi Krishna	Rajesh, K.S.Chithra	4:42
5.	"Premalekha"	Samavedam	Hariharan	4:24
6.	"Oka Devata (Female)"	Venigalla Rambabu	K.S.Chithra, Parthasarathy	4:10
Total length:				27:04

== Reception ==
Jeevi of Idlebrain.com wrote that "First half of the film is superb with Rajendra Prasad comedy and budding love between Srikanth and Soundarya (from Srikanth side). The second half is less entertaining when compared to the first half, as the viewer will come to know the reason behind Soundarya love towards Srikanth. But the tempo of what Srikanth and Soundarya are going to be left with in the climax is the only binding factor for the viewer". A critic from Full Hyderabad wrote that "The film drags on and on without any sense of direction, and the so-called comedy essayed by Rajendra Prasad is drab to the core, as is the rest of the film. The relationship shared by Nagarjuna and Soundarya in the film is a consolation of sorts (if one can call that) for the tired and weary audiences". Indiainfo wrote "Ninne Premista is the latest addition to the list of films ushering in winds of change in Telugu filmdom. It proves beyond doubt what Chitram’s success established: Telugu audience are ever ready to welcome a refreshing fare. Director R R Shinde, who has spent over two decades as assistant director in the industry, couldn’t have asked for a better directorial debut at his age".
