= Jayanan Vincent =

Indian cinematographer

- Born: Kozhikode, Kerala, India
- Occupation: Cinematographer
- Relatives: A. Vincent (father); Ajayan Vincent (brother)

Jayanan Vincent is an Indian cinematographer. He is the son of cinematographer and director A. Vincent and elder brother to Ajayan Vincent. He is known for his work in Malayalam, Telugu, Tamil, and Hindi films and he is a member of the Indian Society of Cinematographers (ISC). He won two Nandi Awards.He received the Kerala State Film Award for Best Cinematography in 1984 for Adiyozhukkukal. He immigrated to Canada to Vancouver BC.

== Selected filmography ==
- 1975 – Jyothi (1976 film) (Telugu)- apprentice, camera department
- 1976 – Kalpana (Telugu) - apprentice, camera department
- 1976 – Secretary (1976 film) (Telugu) - apprentice, camera department
- 1976 – Prema Lekhalu (Telugu) - assistant cameraman
- 1977 – Adavi Ramudu (1977 film) (Telugu) - assistant cameraman
- 1977 – Gadusu Pillodu (Telugu) - assistant cameraman
- 1977 – Agninakshathram (1977 film) (Malayalam) - associate cameraman
- 1977 – Kannappanunni (Malayalam) - assistant cameraman
- 1977 – Naam Pirandha Mann (Tamil) - assistant cameraman
- 1977 – Acharam Ammini Osaram Omana (Malayalam) - camera operator
- 1977 – Mariamman Thiruvizha (Tamil)
- 1978 – K D No 1 (Telugu) - assistant cameraman
- 1978 – Kadathanaattu Maakkam (Malayalam) - assistant cameraman
- 1978 – Rajaputhra Rahasyamu (Telugu) - associate cameraman
- 1978 – Radhakrishna (Telugu) - assistant cameraman
- 1978 – Eetta (Malayalam) - second unit camera
- 1978 – Anappachan (Malayalam)
- 1978 – Ente Neelakasham (Malayalam)
- 1978 – Vayanadan Thampan (Malayalam) - debut as independent cinematographer
- 1978 – Nakshathrangale Kaaval (film) (Malayalam) - second unit camera
- 1979 – Ilamai Kolam (Tamil) - camera operator
- 1979 – Ezhamkadalinakkare (Malayalam) - second unit camera
- 1979 – Ore Vaanam Ore Bhoomi (Tamil) - second unit camera
- 1979 – Allauddinum Albhutha Vilakkum (Malayalam/Tamil) - second unit camera
- 1979 – Rakthamillatha Manushyan (Malayalam) - second unit camera
- 1979 – Hridhayathinte Nirangal (Malayalam) - second unit camera
- 1979 – Pagalil Oru Iravu (Tamil) - second unit camera
- 1979 – Jimmy (1979 film) (Malayalam)
- 1979 – Aarattu (Malayalam)
- 1979 – Veerabhadran (Malayalam)
- 1979 – Pratheeksha (Malayalam)
- 1979 – Ivar (1980 film) (Malayalam)
- 1980 – Bandish (film) (Hindi) - camera operator
- 1980 – Angadi (film) (Malayalam) - second unit camera
- 1980 – Pavizha Mutthu (Malayalam) - second unit camera
- 1980 – Kaanatha Valayam (Malayalam) - second unit camera
- 1980 – Kaali (1980 Tamil film) (Tamil/Telugu) - second unit camera
- 1980 – Guru (Tamil/Telugu)
- 1980 – Krishnapparunthu (Malayalam)
- 1980 – Ashwaradham (Malayalam)
- 1980 – Karimpana (Malayalam)
- 1981 – Sanchari (Malayalam) - second unit camera
- 1981 – Ashajyothi (Telugu) - camera operator
- 1981 – Thrishna (Malayalam)
- 1981 – Ahimsa (Malayalam)
- 1982 – Archanai Pookal (Tamil)
- 1982 – Ina (film) (Malayalam)
- 1982 – Aksharangal (Malayalam)
- 1982 – Njan Ekananu (Malayalam)
- 1982 – Theeram Thedunna Thira (Malayalam)
- 1982 – Idiyum Minnalum (Malayalam)
- 1982 – Innalenkil Nale (Malayalam) - second unit camera
- 1983 – Aanandha Kummi (Tamil) - second unit camera
- 1983 – Aaroodam (Malayalam)
- 1983 – Iniyenkilum (Malayalam)
- 1983 – Rathilayam (Malayalam)
- 1984 – Athirathram (film) (Malayalam)
- 1984 – Aksharangal (Malayalam)
- 1984 – Umaanilayam (Malayalam)
- 1984 – Aalkkoottathil Thaniye (Malayalam)
- 1984 – Kanamarayathu (Malayalam)
- 1984 – Uyarangalil (Malayalam)
- 1984 – Lakshmana Rekha (film) (Malayalam)
- 1984 – Arante Mulla Kochu Mulla (Malayalam)
- 1984 – Adiyozhukkukal (Malayalam)
- 1984 – Karishma (1984 film) (Hindi)
- 1984 – Alaya Deepam (Tamil) - second unit camera
- 1985 – Anu Bandham (Malayalam)
- 1985 – Manicheppu Thurannappol (Malayalam)
- 1985 – Ee Thanalil Ithiri Nerum (Malayalam)
- 1985 – Nirakkoottu(Malayalam)
- 1985 – Iniyum Kadha Thudarum (Malayalam) - second unit camera
- 1985 – Pournami Raavil 3D (Malayalam/Tamil) - second unit camera
- 1986 – Vivahitare Itihile (Malayalam)
- 1986 – Vartha (Malayalam)
- 1986 – Rajavinte Makan (Malayalam)
- 1986 – Adiverukal (Malayalam)
- 1986 – Shyama (Malayalam)
- 1986 – Kshamichu Ennoru Vakku (Malayalam)
- 1986 – Nyayavidhi (Malayalam)
- 1986 – Udayam Padinjaru (Malayalam)
- 1986 – Thaaiku Oru Thaalaattu (Tamil)
- 1987 – Vazhiyorakkazhchakal (Malayalam)
- 1987 – January Oru Orma (Malayalam)
- 1987 – Bhoomiyile Rajakkanmar (Malayalam)
- 1987 – Poovizhi Vasalile (Tamil) - second unit camera
- 1987 – Thoovanathumbikal (Malayalam)
- 1987 – Ithrayum Kalam (Malayalam)
- 1987 – New Delhi (Malayalam)
- 1988 – Sangham (1988 film) (Malayalam)
- 1988 – Manu Uncle (Malayalam)
- 1988 – Antima Teerpu (1988 film) (Telugu)
- 1988 – New Delhi (1988 Kannada film) (Kannada)
- 1988 – Dinarathrangal (Malayalam)
- 1988 – Thanthram(Malayalam)
- 1988 – New Delhi (1988 Hindi film) (Hindi)
- 1988 – David David Mr. David (Malayalam) second unit camera
- 1989 – Naduvazhikal (Malayalam)
- 1989 – Douthyam (Malayalam)
- 1989 – Mahayanam (Malayalam)
- 1989 – Nair Saab (Malayalam)
- 1989 – Adavilo Abhimanyudu (Telugu)
- 1990 – Randam Varavu (Malayalam) - second unit camera
- 1990 – Marupuram (Malayalam) - second unit camera
- 1990 – Kanoon Ki Zanjeer (Hindi) - second unit camera
- 1990 – No.20 Madras Mail (Malayalam)
- 1990 – Nammude Naadu (Malayalam)
- 1990 – Kuruppinte Kanakku Pustakom (Malayalam)
- 1990 – Kuttettan (Malayalam)
- 1990 – Samrajyam (Malayalam)
- 1990 – Ee Thanutha Veluppan Kalathu (Malayalam)
- 1991 – Aathma Bandham (Telugu) - second unit camera
- 1991 – Uncle Bun (Malayalam)- second unit camera
- 1991 – Talli Tandrulu (Telugu) - second unit camera
- 1991 – Pookkalam Varavayi (Malayalam)
- 1992 – O' Faby (Malayalam)
- 1992 – Senthamizh Paattu (Tamil)
- 1992 – Kauravar (Malayalam)
- 1992 – Kizhakkan Pathrose (Malayalam)
- 1992 – Soorya Manasam (Malayalam)
- 1992 – Johnnie Walker (film) (Malayalam) - second unit camera
- 1993 – Airport (Tamil)
- 1993 – Udan Pirappu (Tamil)
- 1993 – Kalaignan (Tamil)
- 1993 – Angarakshakudu (Telugu)
- 1994 – Bobbili Simham (Telugu) - second unit camera
- 1994 – Sainyam (Malayalam)
- 1995 – Ravan Raaj: A True Story (Hindi)
- 1995 – Villadhi Villain (Tamil)
- 1995 – Muthu Kaalai (Tamil)
- 1996 – Poovarasan (Tamil)
- 1996 – Jung (1996 film)(Hindi)
- 1997 – Krishnagudiyil Oru Pranayakalathu (Malayalam) - second unit camera
- 1997 – Aaraam Thampuran (Malayalam) - second unit camera
- 1997 – Bhoopathi (1997 film) (Malayalam) - second unit camera
- 1997 – Gangothri (film) (Malayalam)
- 1997 – Kodieswaran (Tamil) unreleased
- 1998 – Udhavikku Varalaamaa (Tamil)
- 1998 – Premante Idera (Telugu)
- 1999 – Ravoyi Chandamama (Telugu)
- 1999 – F. I. R. (1999 film) (Malayalam) - second unit camera
- 1999 – Hogi Pyaar Ki Jeet (Hindi) - second unit camera
- 1999 – Raja Kumarudu (Telugu) - second unit camera
- 2000 – Bulandi (2000 film) (Hindi) - second unit camera
- 2000 – Sradha (Malayalam)
- 2000 – Sandhitha Velai (Tamil)
- 2001 – Bhalevadivi Basu (Telugu)
- 2001 – Badri (Tamil)
- 2001 – Friends (2001 film) (Tamil) - second unit camera
- 2002 – Takkari Donga (Telugu)
- 2009 – Love 4 Ever (Telugu/Hindi)
- 2009 – Jag Jeondeyan De Mele (Punjabi)
- 2009 – Heer Ranjha: a True Love Story 2009 film (Punjabi)
- 2010 – Om Shanti (Telugu)
- 2011 – Teen Maar (Telugu)
- 2012 – Gabbar Singh (Telugu)
- 2013 – Balupu (Telugu)
- 2013 – Baadshah (Telugu) - second unit camera
- 2014 – Double Di Trouble (Punjabi) - second unit camera
- 2014 – Power (Telugu)
- 2015 – Gopala Gopala (Telugu)
- 2016 – Sardaar Gabbar Singh (Telugu) - second unit camera
- 2017 – The Decision (English)
- 2019 – Kurukshetra (Kannada)

== Awards ==
Nandi Awards

- Best Cinematographer - Premante Idera
- Best Cinematographer - Takkari Donga
