= Krishnapparunthu =

- Directed by: O. Ramdas
- Written by: Sreerangam Vikraman Nair
- Screenplay by: Sreerangam Vikraman Nair
- Produced by: tom
- Starring: P. Jayachandran; Madhu; Srividya; Sreelatha Namboothiri
- Cinematography: Jayanan Vincent
- Music by: Shyam
- Production company: Navabhavana Films
- Distributed by: Navabhavana Films
- Release date: 7 December 1979
- Country: India
- Language: Malayalam

Krishnapparunthu is a 1979 Indian Malayalam film, directed by O. Ramdas and produced by Babu Varghese Nambiaparambil. The film stars P. Jayachandran, Madhu, Srividya and Sreelatha Namboothiri in the lead roles. The film has musical score by Shyam.

== Cast ==
- P. Jayachandran
- Madhu
- Srividya
- Sreelatha Namboothiri
- Prathapachandran
- Ambika
- Bahadoor
- Dr. Namboothiri
- K. P. Ummer

== Soundtrack ==
The music was composed by Shyam and the lyrics were written by Onakkoor Radhakrishnan.

No.	Song	Singers	Lyrics	Length (m:ss)
1	"Anjanashilayile"	P. Jayachandran, Jaseentha	Onakkoor Radhakrishnan	
2	"Janananmaykkaay"	K. J. Yesudas, P. Jayachandran	Onakkoor Radhakrishnan	
3	"Makara Maasathile"	K. J. Yesudas, P. Susheela	Onakkoor Radhakrishnan	
4	"Thrissivaperoore"	P. Jayachandran, Jaseentha	Onakkoor Radhakrishnan	
