= Gokula Krishnan =

Indian film director

- Born: 1945; Tirunelveli, Tamil Nadu, India
- Died: 28 October 2008 (aged 63); Chennai, Tamil Nadu, India
- Occupation: Film director
- Years active: 1982–2008
- Spouse: Kavitha

Gokula Krishnan was an Indian film director who has directed Tamil films. He was primarily active in the 1980s and early 1990s and is most noted for his work on films featuring actor Karthik. He also extensively worked with Malayalam director Fazil and other Malayalam directors when they made Tamil films, helping write dialogues.

== Career ==
Gokula Krishnan made his directorial debut in the early 1980s, before choosing to prioritise his work as a script-writer to Malayalam director Fazil, when he made Tamil films. In the mid-1990s, Gokula Krishnan made three consecutive films with actor Karthik. Muthu Kaalai (1995), Poovarasan (1996) and Udhavikku Varalaamaa (1998) all fared poorly at the box office.

He died after a brief illness on 28 October 2008, leaving behind his wife, Kavitha.

== Filmography ==
=== As director ===
Year	Film	Notes
1982	Archanai Pookal	
1983	Aanandha Kummi	
1986	Maragatha Veenai	
1995	Muthu Kaalai	
1996	Poovarasan	
1998	Udhavikku Varalaamaa	

=== As writer only ===
- Poove Poochooda Vaa (1985)
- Karimedu Karuvayan (1986)
- Poovizhi Vasalile (1987)
- En Bommukutty Ammavukku (1988)
- Varusham Padhinaaru (1989)
- Arangetra Velai (1990)
- Gopura Vasalile (1991)
- Karpoora Mullai (1991)
- Kilipetchu Ketkava (1993)
- Ponnumani (1993)
- Ejamaan (1993)
- Narasimha Naicker (1994)
- Rajakumaran (1994)
- Nandhavana Theru (1995)
- Kadhalukku Mariyadhai (1997)
- Time (1999)
- Kannukkul Nilavu (2000)
- Friends (2001)
- Kanden Seethaiyai (2001)
- Kasi (2001)
- En Mana Vaanil (2002)
- Magic Magic 3D (2003)
- Engal Anna (2004)
- 4 Students (2004)
- Oru Naal Oru Kanavu (2005)
- Sadhu Miranda (2008)
