= Aanandha Kummi =

- Title card
- Directed by: Balakrishnan
- Screenplay by: Balakrishnan
- Story by: Vairamuthu
- Produced by: Jeeva Ilaiyaraaja
- Starring: Balachandran; Ashwini
- Cinematography: A. Vincent
- Edited by: T.Rajasekar
- Music by: Ilaiyaraaja
- Production company: Ilaiyaraaja Pictures
- Release date: 25 December 1983
- Country: India
- Language: Tamil

Aanandha Kummi (transl. Joyful hand clapping) is a 1983 Indian Tamil-language film directed by Gokula Krishnan (credited as Balakrishnan) and produced by Jeeva Ilaiyaraaja for Ilaiyaraaja Pictures. The film stars Ashwini and a newcomer Balachandran. It was released on 25 December 1983, and failed at the box office.

== Plot ==
The pannaiyar of a small village is highly respected due to his generosity and kindness. His wife is equally well-liked and the loving couple have a son, Jeeva. The pannaiyar's right-hand man is Azhagiri, a man who's feared throughout the town as he's prone to violence. However, he will only resort to violence when he feels an injustice or wrong warrants his intervention. Azhagiri's sister, Devanai, is a young widow with a daughter, Selvi. The pannaiyar and his wife financially support Devanai's family. Selvi and Jeeva go to school together and are friends from childhood. As they grow older, their friendship grows into love. They go away to attend the same college. While they're away, long brewing secrets between the two families come to light and drastically change both families' circumstances. Jeeva and Selvi return home to a much-altered situation and face new challenges to their love that they must overcome.

== Cast ==
- Balachandran
- Ashwini
- Goundamani
- Senthil
- Baby Shalini
- Pasi Narayanan
- Karuppu Subbiah

== Production ==
The film was launched on 24 April 1983 at AVM Studios.

== Soundtrack ==
Soundtrack was composed by Ilaiyaraaja. A section of the song "Oru Kili Uruguthu" was incorporated into the official trailer for The Lovebirds (2020). The song also features in Miracle, a segment of the anthology film Putham Pudhu Kaalai (2020). The same song was reused by Ilaiyaraaja as "Jilibili" for the Telugu film Sitaara (1984). A snippet of the song "Oh Vennilave" was reused by the rapper M.I.A. in her 2022 song "Energy Freq".

Song title	Singer(s)	Lyricist
"Anandhakummi"	S.P. Sailaja	Vairamuthu
"Oru Kili Uruguthu"	S. Janaki, S.P. Sailaja	Vairamuthu
"Malarthinrukku"	S. Janaki, S.P. Sailaja	Vairamuthu
"Oomai Nenjin"	S.P. Balasubrahmanyam, S. Janaki	Vairamuthu
"Oru Kili Uruguthu"	S.P. Balasubrahmanyam	Vairamuthu
"Oh Vennilaave"	S.P. Balasubrahmanyam, S. Janaki	Vairamuthu
"Thamaraikodi"	S.P. Balasubrahmanyam	Vairamuthu
"Thindaduthe"	Ilaiyaraaja	Vairamuthu
"Anandhakummi – Oh Vennilaave Va"	S.P. Balasubrahmanyam, S.Janaki & S.P. Sailaja	Vairamuthu
"Annan Mare"	S.P. Balasubrahmanyam, Ilaiyaraaja, Gangai Amaren & Dr. Kalyan	Gangai Amaran
"Machan Maatikitaru"	S.P. Balasubrahmanyam, Ilaiyaraaja, Gangai Amaren and B.S. Sashirekha	Gangai Amaran

== Critical reception ==
Jayamanmadhan of Kalki praised the cinematography and music but felt the situations were not perfect enough to befit these two and panned the acting of debut actors.
