= ITFA Best Supporting Actress Award =

Kollywood film award

The ITFA Best Supporting Actress Award is given by the state government as part of its annual International Tamil Film Awards for Tamil (Kollywood) films.

== The list ==
Here is a list of the award winners and the films for which they won.

Year	Actress	Film
2008	Nikita Thukral	Saroja
2002	Devayani	Azhagi

== See also ==
- Tamil cinema
- Cinema of India
