= Sema Ragalai =

- Poster
- Directed by: Ramkumar
- Starring: Sathyaraj; Devayani; Kalabhavan Mani
- Music by: Simmam Kumar
- Release date: 16 July 2004
- Running time: 140 minutes
- Country: India
- Language: Tamil

Sema Ragalai is a 2004 Indian Tamil-language film directed by Ramkumar. The film stars Sathyaraj and Devayani, with Kalabhavan Mani in a pivotal role. The film was released on 16 July 2004.

== Plot ==
Sathyaraj and Kalabhavan Mani are friends. Mani works in the fire department and Sathyaraj aspires to go abroad. Sathyaraj, in a mix up, kidnaps Devayani. Devayani initially dislikes Sathyaraj for his persistent taunts. Later she develops a soft corner for Sathyaraj. Sathyaraj finally gets the opportunity to go abroad. Meantime, Mani loves Devayani. The climax concerns who will get Devayani's hand.

== Cast ==
- Sathyaraj
- Devayani
- Kalabhavan Mani
- Chitti Babu
- Bhuvaneswari
- Priyanka

== Soundtrack ==
Music is composed by newcomer Simmam Kumar.

- "Agravin Aarambamae" – Harish Raghavendra, Harini
- "Holy Holy" – P. Jayachandran, Chinmayi
- "Thulluvatho Ilamai" – Tippu, Chinmayi
- "Thuli Thuli Mazhiyinil" – Tippu
- "Thuli Thuli Mazhiyinil Rpt" – Simmam Kumar
- "Dhil Irukku" – Tippu

== Reception ==
A critic from Cinesouth noted, "The film's title is typical of all Sathyaraj films but it lacks anything that even remotely looks like him in the film. The film seems to be an attempt to repeat the comedy tracks done by Vivek and Vadivelu with Sathyaraj".
