= Maragatha Veenai (film) =

- Title card
- Directed by: Gokula Krishnan
- Screenplay by: Gokula Krishnan
- Story by: T. R. Sekhar
- Produced by: Rajamanickam
- Starring: Suresh; Revathi
- Cinematography: B. S. Basavaraj
- Edited by: T. R. Sekhar
- Music by: Ilaiyaraaja
- Production company: Naveena Films
- Release date: 14 March 1986
- Country: India
- Language: Tamil

Maragatha Veenai (transl. Emerald Veena) is a 1986 Indian Tamil-language film directed by Gokula Krishnan, starring Suresh and Revathi. It was released on 14 March 1986.

== Plot ==
Kokila is abandoned as a child and taken in by Carnatic musician who is impressed with her natural singing skills. He and his wife raise her as their own. When her father falls ill, Kokila becomes the sole earner in her family and is forced to go to work. Kokila starts as the new music teacher at a school in a small village. Kannan is the drill master at the same school and is rude to Kokila from their first meeting. Their relationship deteriorates until an injury causes Kannan to repent and apologize for his behavior. The two soon fall in love and Kannan's mother approves of their marriage. Kokila is called back home suddenly and told that her parents have arranged her marriage with Dr. Chandrasekar, the man that saved her father's life. Unable to say no to the people that took her in, she agrees to marry him and breaks things off with Kannan. Things come to a head when Kannan is forced into a marriage by his family and Chandrasekar learns the truth.

== Cast ==
- Suresh as Kannan
- Revathi as Kokila
- Vagai Chandrasekhar as Dr. Chandrasekar
- Goundamani as the school headmaster
- Manorama as Agni
- Senthil as the school clerk
- Kallapetti Singaram as the Thamizh Asiriyar
- Sangili Murugan as the town Minor
- Vinu Chakravarthy as Kannan's uncle
- J. V. Somayajulu as Kokila's adopted father
- Vadivukkarasi as Kokila's adopted mother
- Baby Sonia as young Kokila

== Production ==
The film's story was written by T. R. Sekhar who also worked as the film's editor. The song "Maragatha Veenai" was picturised at Monkey Falls at Anaimalai hills.

== Soundtrack ==
The soundtrack was composed by Ilaiyaraaja.

Song	Singers	Lyrics
"Chee Chee Poonga"	Manorama, Malaysia Vasudevan	Thirupathooran
"Ennai Nee Padathe"	S. Janaki	Vaali
"Kanna Vaa"	S. Janaki	Vairamuthu
"Isaiyin Deivam"	S. Janaki	Vairamuthu
"Oru Poovanakuyil"	S. Janaki	Mu. Metha
"Maragatha Veenai"	K. J. Yesudas, S. Janaki	Pulamaipithan
"Suthaa Madhuraya"	V. Dakshinamoorthy, S. Janaki	Tyagaraja
