= Vadivukkarasi =

Indian film and television actress (born 1955)

Vadivukkarasi Padhmanabhan
- Born: 7 July 1958 (age 68); Tamil Nadu, India
- Occupation: Actress / Producer
- Years active: 1978–present
- Spouse: Dekshinamurthy Sabapathy (sep)
- Children: Shanmugappriya
- Relatives: A. P. Nagarajan (maternal uncle)

Vadivukkarasi is an Indian actress who appears primarily in supporting roles in Tamil films. She also appears in Telugu, Kannada and Malayalam films. She has starred in over 350 films and participated in around 40 television serials in Tamil.

== Personal life ==
Vadiukarasi's maternal uncle is director A. P. Nagarajan, and she was named after his film Vadivukku Valai Kappu. She has one daughter Shanmugappriya.

== Career ==
Vadivukarasi's first job was as a primary school teacher. Due to her struggling family situation she chose to do different jobs. She made her debut in Tamil film Sigappu Rojakkal. Her first lead role was in Kanni Paruvathile. She has played various characters, playing the lead, supporting as well as antagonistic roles.

She has produced films under the banner Mantralaya arts such as Annai en Deivam.

In the early 2000s, she started acting in television serials.

She has done 350 movies and featured in more than 40 television serials.

== Filmography ==
=== Tamil ===
- Sigappu Rojakkal (1978) - Debut
- Shri Kanchi Kamakshi (1978)
- Kanni Paruvathile (1979)
- Enippadigal (1979)
- Porter Ponnusami (1979)
- Deiveega Raagangal (1980)
- Kannil Theriyum Kathaikal (1980)
- Aayiram Vaasal Idhayam (1980)
- Malargindra Paruvathile (1980)
- Naan Naaney Than (1980)
- Yaagasaalai (1980)
- Azhaithal Varuven (1980)
- Panam Penn Pasam (1980)
- Madhavi Vandhal (1980)
- Kaalam Orunaal Maarum (1981)
- Vaa Kanna Vaa (1982)
- Ethanai Konam Ethanai Parvai (1982)
- Kelviyum Naane Pathilum Naane (1982)
- Nadamadum Silaigal (1982)
- Kanne Radha (1982)
- Metti (1982)
- Nizhal Thedum Nenjangal (1982)
- Bhagavathipuram Railway Gate (1983)
- Sandhippu (1983)
- Theerppu En Kaiyil (1984)
- Raja Veettu Kannukkutty (1984)
- Shanthi Muhurtham (1984)
- Vaidehi Kathirunthal (1984)
- Oh Maane Maane (1984)
- Magudi (1984)
- Unnai Vidamatten (1985)
- Santhosha Kanavukal (1985)
- Ilamai (1985)
- Meendum Parasakthi (1985)
- Engal Kural (1985)
- Muthal Mariyathai (1985)
- Neethiyin Marupakkam (1985)
- Padikkadavan (1985)
- Ketti Melam (1985)
- Mr. Bharath (1986)
- Selvakku (1986)
- Maragatha Veenai (1986)
- Nambinar Keduvathillai (1986)
- Annai En Dheivam (1986)
- Kannukku Mai Ezhuthu (1986)
- Aruvadai Naal (1986) - Vadivu
- Velundu Vinaiyillai (1987)
- Dhoorathu Pachai (1987)
- Anjatha Singam (1987)
- Paruva Ragam (1987)
- Penmani Aval Kanmani (1988)
- Thambi Thanga Kambi (1988)
- En Thamizh En Makkal (1988)
- Sathyaa (1988)
- Uzhaithu Vaazha Vendum (1988)
- Vaai Kozhuppu (1989)
- Varusham Padhinaaru (1989)
- Oru Thottil Sabadham (1989)
- Unnai Solli Kutramillai (1990)
- En Uyir Thozhan (1990)
- Vedikkai En Vadikkai (1990)
- Engitta Mothathay (1990)
- Thalattu Ketkuthamma (1991)
- Nenjamundu Nermaiyundu (1991)
- Naane Varuven (1992)
- Chinna Pasanga Naanga (1992)
- Chinna Marumagal (1992)
- Kizhakku Veedhi (1992)
- Pattathu Raani (1992)
- Abhirami (1992)
- Chinna Kannamma (1993)
- Maharasan (1993)
- Pettredutha Pillai (1993)
- Pass Mark (1993)
- Porantha Veeda Puguntha Veeda (1993)
- Rajadhi Raja Raja Kulothunga Raja Marthanda Raja Gambeera Kathavaraya Krishna Kamarajan (1993)
- Ravanan (1994)
- Veera (1994)
- Sathyavan (1994)
- Karuththamma (1994)
- Thai Maaman (1994)
- Karuththamma (1994)
- Vanaja Girija (1994)
- Muthu Kaalai (1995)
- Thottil Kuzhandhai (1995)
- Thondan (1995)
- Amman (1995)
- Rajavin Parvaiyile (1995)
- Mannai Thottu Kumbidanum (1995)
- Thirumbi Paar (1996)
- Kizhakku Mugam (1996)
- Vaanmathi (1996)
- Kaalam Maari Pochu (1996)
- Rajali (1996)
- Sundara Purushan (1996)
- Enakkoru Magan Pirappan (1996)
- Alexander (1996)
- Vetri Vinayagar (1996)
- Nalla Manasukkaran (1997)
- Periya Thambi (1997)
- Mannava (1997)
- Nandhini (1997)
- Arunachalam (1997)
- Pongalo Pongal (1997)
- Udhavikku Varalaamaa (1998)
- Dhinamdhorum (1998)
- Velai (1998)
- Kavalai Padathe Sagodhara (1998)
- Dharma (1998)
- Poonthottam (1998)
- Nee Varuvai Ena (1998)
- Kannathal (1998)
- Thalaimurai (1998)
- Maya (1999)
- Annan (1999)
- Annan Thangachi (1999)
- Jayam (1999)
- Padayappa (1999)
- Poovellam Kettuppar (1999)
- Kanmani Unakkaga (1999)
- Kudumba Sangili (1999) as Valliyamma
- Aandavan (2000)
- Karisakattu Poove (2000)
- Snegithiye (2000)
- Magalirkkaga (2000)
- Sonnal Thaan Kaadhala (2001)
- Maayan (2001)
- Thavasi (2001) as Maragathammal
- Parthale Paravasam (2001) as Akilam
- Kasi (2001) as Muniyamma
- Punnagai Desam (2002)
- Samurai (2002)
- Samasthanam (2002)
- Solla Marandha Kadhai (2002)
- Guruvamma (2002)
- Aalukkoru Aasai (2003)
- Paarai (2003)
- Galatta Ganapathy (2003)
- Engal Anna (2004) as Easwari
- Kadhale Jayam (2004)
- Kannamma (2005)
- Sevvel (2005)
- Pesuvoma (2005)
- Iyappa Saamy (2006)
- Thirudi (2006)
- Sivaji (2007) as Parvathi Aarumugam, Sivaji’s mother
- Valluvan Vasuki (2008)
- Aachariyar (2008)
- Munnar (2009)
- En Kanmani Priya (2010)
- Gurusamy (2011)
- Oththa Veedu (2012)
- Anbulla Manvizhiye (2012)
- Kai (2012)
- Neerparavai (2012) as Ebenezar
- Unakku 20 Enakku 40 (2013)
- Anjal Thurai (2013)
- Sokku Sundaram (2014)
- Idam Porul Yaeval (2015)
- Puli (2015)
- Apoorva Mahaan (2015)
- Sowkarpettai (2016)
- Iraivi (2016) as Meenakshi
- Ka Ka Ka Po (2016)
- Kollidam (2016)
- Veera Vamsam (2017)
- Aakkam (2017)
- Namma Kadha (2017)
- Silukkuvarupatti Singam (2018)
- Peranbu (2019)
- Kanne Kalaimaane (2019)
- Jagame Thandhiram (2021) as Manimegalai
- Jananayagam Virpanaikku Alla (2022)
- Viruman (2022) as Kannatha
- N4 (2023) as Kannamma
- 800 (2023) as Angammal
- Garudan (2024) as Sellayee
- Thiru.Manickam (2024) as Elderly man’s (Bharathiraja) wife
- Niram Marum Ulagil (2025) as Kuzhandhai
- Nizharkudai (2025)
- Jinn - The Pet (2025)
- Thug Life (2025) as Pechiamma “Pechi”
- Panai (2025)
- Idli Kadai (2025) as Murugan’s Grandmother
- Vaa Vaathiyaar (2026) as Devayani, Ramu’s Grandmother
- Granny (2026)
- Con City (2026) as Janaki

=== Telugu ===
Year	Title	Role	Notes
1982	Patnam Vachina Pativrathalu	Sakunthala	Uncredited role
1983	Ramarajyamlo Bheemaraju	Seetha	
1990	Neti Siddhartha	Bharathi	
1995	Ammoru	Leelamma	
2001	Vyjayanthi	Maharani	
2006	Andala Ramudu	Ramudu's grandmother	
2006	Ashok	Yagamma	
2007	Gundamma Gaari Manavadu	Gundamma	
2007	Poramboku	Chaitra's foster mother	
2024	Ooru Peru Bhairavakona	Pedhamma	
2024	Swag	Vijjiamma	

=== Malayalam ===
Year	Title	Role
1979	Irumbazhikal	Thulasi
1979	Avano Atho Avalo	Gowri
1983	Onnu Chirikku	Rohini's elder sister
1993	Bandhukkal Sathrukkal	Dakshayani
1998	Sreekrishnapurathe Nakshathrathilakkam	Santhanavalli
2004	Youth Festival	
2010	Raama Raavanan	
2015	Ivan Maryadaraman	Narasimhan's mother

=== Kannada ===
Year	Title	Role
1984	Sidilu	
1987	Sedina Sanchu	
1991	Naagini	
1999	Jayasoorya	

=== Dubbing artist ===
Actress	Title	Language
Vanisri	Pokkiri Ponnu	Tamil (dubbed)
Vanisri	Vaaliban	Tamil (dubbed)
Vanisri	Bombay Kaadhali	Tamil (dubbed)
Lakshmi	En Pondatti Collector	Tamil (dubbed)
Lakshmi	Rowdy Boss	Tamil (dubbed)
Ashwini	Indira	Tamil
Kalpana Iyer	Iruvar	Tamil
KPAC Lalitha	Alaipayuthey	Tamil
KPAC Lalitha	Kireedam	Tamil
Sethulakshmi	36 Vayathinile	Tamil

=== Television ===
Serials

Year	Film	Role	Telecasted	Notes
	Meen		DD	
1991	Kadalpurathil		DD5	
1995	Viduthalai		DD	Producer
1996	Sakthi		Sun TV	
1998–1999	Kudumbam		Sun TV	
1999–2001	Ganga Yamuna Saraswati		Sun TV	
2000	Micro Thodargal-Savvukadi		Raj TV	
2001–2003	Alaigal	Kalyani	Sun TV	
2001–2007	Ninaivugal		DD	
2003–2007	Avargal		Sun TV	
2003–2005	Adugiran Kannan		Sun TV	
2002–2004	Sakthi		Sun TV	
2003–2007	Tharkappu Kalai Theeratha		Sun TV	
2002–2003	Agal Vilakkugal	Rukkumani	Sun TV	
2003–2005	Adugiran Kannan		Sun TV	
2004–2005	Gowravam		Raj TV	
2004–2006	Raja Rajeshwari		Sun TV	
2005–2006	Alli Raajiyam	Lakshmi	Sun TV	
2006–2007	Chellamadi Nee Enakku		Sun TV	
2006–2007	Vikiramathithan		Sun TV	
2007–2010	Megala	Shanmuga Vadivu	Sun TV	
2007–2013	Thirumathi Selvam	Sivagami Sivaraman	Sun TV	
2008–2010	Porantha Veeda Puguntha Veeda		Sun TV	
2009–2010	Amman		Sun TV	
2009	Bhavani		Kalaignar TV	
2009–	Dhayam		Kalaignar TV	
2010–2012	Kasthuri		Sun TV	
2010–2011	Yaamiruka Bayamen		Star Vijay	
2010–2011	En Peyar Meenakshi	Dhanam	Star Vijay	
2011–2013	Uthiripookal	Sharadambal	Sun TV	
2012–2013	Vellai Thamarai		Sun TV	
2013–2014	Vamsam	Nagavalli	Sun TV	
2013–2014	Uravugal Sangamam		Raj TV	
2013–2014	Ranga Vilas	Vairamani	Jaya TV	
2015–2018	Kula Deivam	Gnanambal	Sun TV	
2017	Rekka Katti Parakkudhu Manasu	Thyaramma	Zee Tamil	
2017	Saravanan Meenatchi	Judge	Star Vijay	Cameo appearance
2018–2022	Roja	Annapoorani	Sun TV	
2018	Chinna Thambi	Kadambavanathu Amma	Star Vijay	
2019–2020	Nachiyarpuram	Nagarathnam	Zee Tamil	
2020	Poove Unakkaga	Annapoorani	Sun TV	Cameo appearance
2022	Rettai Roja	Tayamma	Zee Tamil	
2022; 2023	Kayal	Rajalakshmi	Sun TV	Extended cameo appearance
2022	Mandhira Punnagai	Lakshmi	Colors Tamil	
2022	Aruvi	Annapoorani	Sun TV	Cameo appearances
2023	Amudhavum Annalakshmiyum	Nachiyar	Zee Tamil	Cameo appearances
2023	Iniya	Periya Aachi	Sun TV	Cameo appearances
2023	Thavamai Thavamirundhu	Chamundeshwari	Zee Tamil	Cameo appearances
2023–2024	Kannedhirey Thondrinal	Abhirami	Kalaignar TV	Extended cameo appearance
2023–present	Karthigai Deepam	Parameshwari	Zee Tamil	
2024	Sundari	Porkodi	Sun TV	
2024	Veera	Kokila	Zee Tamil	Cameo appearance
2025	Moondru Mudhichu	Rajalakshmi	Sun TV	Cameo appearance
2025–2026	Police Police	Sivagami	JioHotstar	Web series
2026	Sandhya Raagam	Rajanayagi	Zee Tamil	Cameo appearance

Shows

Year	Title	Role	Channel
2021	Poova Thalaiya	Guest	Sun TV
2021	Vanakkam Tamizha	Guest	Sun TV
2022	Roja Rojadan	Herself	Sun TV
2022	Roja Vetri Vizha	Herself	Sun TV
2023	Super Samayal	Contestant	Sun TV
2023	Vaa Tamizha Vaa	Guest	Kalaignar TV
