= Premotsava =

- Directed by: Dinesh Babu
- Written by: Dinesh Babu
- Produced by: Anitha Kumaraswamy
- Starring: Vishnuvardhan; Devayani; Roja
- Cinematography: Dinesh Babu
- Edited by: B. S. Kemparaj
- Music by: Praveen Dutt
- Production company: Chennambika Films
- Release date: 22 October 1999
- Running time: 142 minutes
- Country: India
- Language: Kannada

Premotsava (transl. Festival of love) is a 1999 Indian Kannada-language romantic drama film directed and written by Dinesh Babu. The film stars Vishnuvardhan along with Devayani (in her Kannada debut), Roja and Tara in the prominent roles. The film was produced by Anitha Kumaraswamy and presented by H. D. Kumaraswamy for "Chennambika Films" banner. The film was released on 22 October 1999 to generally positive reviews from critics.

== Cast ==
- Vishnuvardhan as Bharath
- Devayani as Chandana
- Roja as Bhavana
- Tara as Shanti
- Ramakrishna as Krishna
- Sumithra as Hospital Warden
- Chitra Shenoy as Sara
- Tharakesh Patel

== Production ==
The film was earlier titled as Navodaya and had cast Bollywood actress Priya Gill for the lead role. However, she was replaced with Devayani, a Tamil actress making her debut in Kannada cinema.

== Soundtrack ==
The music of the film was composed debutant Praveen Dutt.

Premotsava

Soundtrack album by Praveen Dutt
- Released: 1999
- Genre: Feature film soundtrack
- Label: Jhankar Music

No.	Title	Lyrics	Singer(s)	Length
1.	"Sneha Beleyutha"	Doddarangegowda	S. P. Balasubrahmanyam, K. S. Chitra
2.	"Mathugathi Missamma"	Shyamsundar Kulkarni	Rajesh Krishnan
3.	"Hrudaya Ee Hrudaya"	Hamsalekha	K. S. Chithra
4.	"Suryana Therige"	Hamsalekha	S. P. Balasubrahmanyam
5.	"Preethi Thoruva"	Doddarangegowda	S. P. Balasubrahmanyam, K. S. Chithra
6.	"Olidavarella"	Hamsalekha	S. P. Balasubrahmanyam, K. S. Chithra
7.	"Hrudaya Ee Hrudaya"	Hamsalekha	S. P. Balasubrahmanyam
8.	"Usire Mellusire"	K. Kalyan	K. S. Chithra

== Reception ==
Deccan Herald wrote "Looks like even an innovative director like Dinesh Baboo is fast running out of ideas. Baboo, whose films belong to a different league because of his experimentation with story and characters, has probably not done justice to his reputation in Premothsava. Compared to his previous films like Hendthige Helbedi and Nishyabda, Premothsava is a let down but still worth watching".
