= Thirumathi Thamizh =

2013 Tamil film by Rajakumaran

- Theatrical release poster
- Directed by: Rajakumaran
- Written by: Rajakumaran
- Produced by: Devayani
- Starring: Devayani; Rajakumaran; Keerthi Chawla
- Cinematography: Ram Singh
- Music by: S. A. Rajkumar
- Production company: Raa Dea Films
- Release date: 13 April 2013
- Running time: 151 minutes
- Country: India
- Language: Tamil

Thirumathi Thamizh (transl. Mrs. Thamizh) is a 2013 Indian Tamil-language romantic comedy film directed by Rajakumaran. The film stars himself alongside Devayani and Keerthi Chawla with Ramesh Khanna in a supporting role. It was released on 13 April 2013.

== Cast ==
- Devayani as Jothi
  - Yuvina Parthavi as young Jothi
- Rajakumaran as Thamizhselvan
  - Ray Paul as young Thamizhselvan
- Keerthi Chawla as Charumathi
- Babloo Prithiveeraj as the groom
- Ramesh Khanna as Manoharan, Thamizh's friend
- Radha Ravi
- Charuhasan
- Rohini
- Madhan Bob
- Vaiyapuri
- Scissor Manohar
- Crane Manohar
- Delhi Ganesh
- Chitti Babu
- Thalaivasal Vijay as R. Vijay
- Sathyapriya
- Fathima Babu
- Pasi Sathya
- Malaysia Vasudevan
- LIC Narasimhan as judge
- Livingston as a lawyer
- Ganja Karuppu as jail inmate
- Pandu as police officer
- Nellai Siva as police officer
- Bayilvan Ranganathan as the police inspector
- Singamuthu as Ramakrishna Gurukkal
- Robo Shankar as himself
- Chutti Aravind as himself

== Production ==
The film began production in 2008, and is Devayani's 75th film. It was the last film of veteran actor Malaysia Vasudevan.

== Soundtrack ==
The music was composed by S. A. Rajkumar.

Track listing
No.	Title	Singer(s)	Length
1.	"Thamizh Thamizh"	S. P. Balasubrahmanyam
2.	"Thamizh Thamizh" (Remix 1)	S. P. Balasubramaniam, K. S. Chithra, S. A. Rajkumar
3.	"Thamizh Thamizh" (Remix 2)	K. S. Chithra, S. A. Rajkumar
4.	"Thirukkural"	S. P. Balasubrahmanyam, S. A. Rajkumar
5.	"Nayagan"	Kalyani, Vijay Yesudas, S. A. Rajkumar
6.	"Nayagan" (Remix 1)	Kalyani
7.	"Nayagan" (Remix 2)	S. A. Rajkumar
8.	"Va Va Vennilave"	Shweta Mohan, Mukesh Mohamed
9.	"Va Va Vennilave" (Remix)	Shweta Mohan

== Critical reception ==
The Times of India gave the film one out of five stars and wrote that "The movie could have made for a much better watch had the director focused on the social issues it started out to discuss". A critic from Kungumam panned the screenplay.
