= Devayani (actress) =

Indian actress (born 1973)

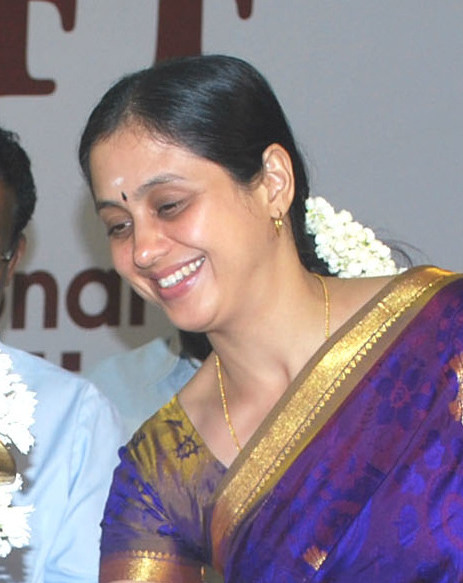
- Devayani at Mumbai International Film Festival, 2014
- Born: Sushma Jaidev; 22 June 1974 (age 52); Bombay, Maharashtra (now Mumbai), India
- Occupation: Actress
- Years active: 1993–present
- Spouse: Rajakumaran (m. 2001)
- Children: 2
- Relatives: Nakul (brother)
- Awards: Kalaimamani Award (2000)

Sushma Jaidev (born 22 June 1974), professionally known as Devayani Rajakumaran, is an Indian actress known for her works primarily in Tamil and Malayalam films. She has also appeared in a few Telugu, Kannada, Hindi and Bengali films.

She has received several awards for her performances in Kadhal Kottai (1996), Suryavamsam (1997) and Bharathi (2000).

She was honoured with a Kalaimamani Award in 2000. She won the Best Supporting Actress for the movie Azhagi (2002). She also won the Best Television Actress for her role in the serial Kolangal (2003–2009).

== Personal life ==
Devayani was born on 22 June 1974 in Mumbai, Maharashtra to a Konkani father from Mangalore and a Malayali mother. She has two younger brothers Nakkhul and Mayur. The former is working as an actor and singer in the Tamil film industry. She married director Rajakumaran on 9 April 2001. They have two daughters.

== Career ==
Devayani began her career in the Hindi film Koyal, which was later cancelled during its production stage. She later appeared in Bengali film Shaat Ponchomi (1993). She also acted in a Marathi film before debuting in the South with lead roles in Malayalam films as Kinnaripuzhayoram (1994).

Devayani made her debut with the film Thotta Chinungi (1995). Flaunting her glamorous avatar, the actress gained popularity in 1996 with the film Kadhal Kottai. She starred opposite Ajith in the film which was directed by Agathiyan. The film received positive acclaim among the audience. The movie was successful in establishing Devayani as the most successful actress in South Indian Cinema. Devayani, later, appeared in many films opposite several renowned names in the film industry.

She was a part of several successful films, including Surya Vamsam (1997), Marumalarchi (1998), Ninaithen Vandhai (1998), Nee Varuvai Ena (1999), Bharathi (2000), Thenali (2000), Friends (2001), Aanandham (2001) and Azhagi (2002).

The late 90s and early 2000s were the golden years for Devayani as she delivered over 50 films, and most of them were blockbusters.

Devayani over the years played powerful female characters until 2001 when she fell in love with Rajakumaran who directed her Vinnukum Mannukum. She has also played small cameos in hit movies like Panchathantiram (2002) alongside Kamal Haasan.

She has become a virtual cult figure in Tamil Nadu after the success of the Mega Serial Sun TV's serial Kolangal (2003–2009).

She has produced a few films that her husband directs, a notable one being Thirumathi Thamizh (2013) where she played an important role.

In the late 2010s she was a judge on a reality show on Mazhavil Manorama titled Ugram Ujwalam. In 2021, she acted in Pudhu Pudhu Arthangal, a Tamil serial of Zee Tamil. Later, she slowly took up the role of mother.

Devayani has directed a short film named Kaikuttai Rani (2024). The film won Best Children's Short Film at the 7th Jaipur International Film Festival, marking a significant milestone in Devayani's transition from acting to filmmaking.

== Filmography ==
List of Devayani film credits
Year	Title	Role	Language	Notes
1993	Shaat Ponchomi		Bengali	Credited as Sushma
1993	Dhusar Godhuli	Moulika	Bengali	Credited as Koel
1994	Kinnaripuzhayoram	Indhu	Malayalam	Malayalam Debut
1995	Achan Rajavu Appan Jethavu	Alice	Malayalam	
1995	Three Men Army	Shubha	Malayalam	
1995	Kakkakum Poochakkum Kalyanam	Latha.S.Pillai	Malayalam	
1995	Dil Ka Doctor	Dolly	Hindi	Credited as Koyal and Hindi cinema debut
1995	Thotta Chinungi	Ramya	Tamil	Tamil Debut
1996	Kalloori Vaasal	Nivetha	Tamil	
1996	Chhota Sa Ghar	Vidya	Hindi	Credited as Koyal
1996	Kadhal Kottai	Kamali	Tamil	Tamil Nadu State Film Award Special Prize; Nominated, Filmfare Award for Best Actress – Tamil
1996	Poomani	Vijaya	Tamil	
1996	Sivasakthi	Guest Appearance	Tamil	
1996	Mahathma	Saraswathi	Malayalam	
1996	Kinnam Katta Kallan	Anju	Malayalam	
1996	Mr. Clean	Nirmala	Malayalam	
1996	Kaathil Oru Kinnaram	Megha	Malayalam	
1996	Ajay	Anjali	Hindi	
1997	Vivasaayi Magan	Jyothi	Tamil	
1997	Kaadhali	Soubhagyavathi	Tamil	
1997	Periya Idathu Mappillai	Lakshmi	Tamil	
1997	Surya Vamsam	Nandhini	Tamil	Tamil Nadu State Film Award for Best Actress; Nominated, Filmfare Award for Best Actress – Tamil
1998	Suswagatham	Sandhya	Telugu	Telugu Debut
1998	Kizhakkum Merkkum	Malli	Tamil	
1998	Marumalarchi	Jayanthi	Tamil	
1998	Udhavikku Varalaamaa	Mythili	Tamil	
1998	Swarnamukhi	Swarnamukhi	Tamil	
1998	Ninaithen Vandhai	Savithri	Tamil	
1998	Moovendhar	Vaidegi	Tamil	
1998	Poonthottam	Sundari	Tamil	
1998	Senthooram	Otta Rosa (Megala)	Tamil	
1998	Srimathi Vellostha	Archana	Telugu	
1998	En Uyir Nee Thaane	Janaki	Tamil	
1998	Pudhumai Pithan	Aarthi	Tamil	
1999	Thodarum	Seetha Anand	Tamil	
1999	Kummi Paattu	Amaravathi	Tamil	
1999	Nee Varuvai Ena	Nandhini	Tamil	Nominated, Filmfare Award for Best Actress – Tamil
1999	Oruvan	Nandhini	Tamil	
1999	Premotsava	Chandana	Kannada	Kannada Debut
1999	Nilave Mugam Kaattu	Kasthuri	Tamil	
1999	Paattali	Sakunthala	Tamil	
1999	Manikyam	Meenakshi	Telugu	
2000	Vallarasu	Anjali Vallarasu	Tamil	
2000	Appu	Seetha	Tamil	
2000	Ennamma Kannu	Gayathri	Tamil	
2000	Bharathi	Chellamal Bharathi	Tamil	Tamil Nadu State Film Award for Best Actress; Nominated, Filmfare Award for Best Actress – Tamil
2000	Thenali	Jalaja Kailash	Tamil	
2000	Kannukku Kannaga	Devi	Tamil	
2001	Friends	Padmini	Tamil	
2001	En Purushan Kuzhandhai Maadhiri	Maheswari	Tamil	
2001	Vinnukum Mannukum	Devayani	Tamil	
2001	Aanandham	Bharathi	Tamil	Nominated, Filmfare Award for Best Actress – Tamil
2001	Ninaikkaadha Naalillai	Kavitha	Tamil	
2001	Sundara Purushan	Jyothika Menon	Malayalam	
2001	Kottai Mariamman	Rajeswari	Tamil	
2002	Vivaramana Aalu	Pappu	Tamil	
2002	Azhagi	Valarmathi Shanmugham	Tamil	ITFA Best Supporting Actress Award; Nominated, Filmfare Award for Best Supporting Actress – Tamil
2002	Panchathantiram	Nirmala	Tamil	
2002	Thenkasi Pattanam	Sangeetha	Tamil	
2002	Guruvamma	Guruvamma	Tamil	
2002	Samasthanam	Divya	Tamil	
2002	Padai Veetu Amman	Samundi	Tamil	
2002	Chennakesava Reddy	Chennakesava Reddy's sister	Telugu	
2003	Kadhaludan	Kavitha	Tamil	Also producer
2003	Bheeshmar	Gowri Bheeshmar	Tamil	
2003	Balettan	Radhika	Malayalam	
2004	Naani	Indira Devi	Telugu	Simultaneously shot in Telugu and Tamil
2004	New	Indira	Tamil	Simultaneously shot in Telugu and Tamil
2004	Sivaram	Nandhini	Telugu	
2004	Giri	Suryaprakash's wife	Tamil	
2004	Sema Ragalai	Devi	Tamil	
2004	Senthalam Poovae		Tamil	
2004	Soumyam		Malayalam	
2005	Naran	Janaki	Malayalam	
2009	Aiyantham Padai	Kalpana Gunasekaran	Tamil	
2010	Oru Naal Varum	Rajalekshmi	Malayalam	
2011	Sarkar Colony	Padmini Shivaramakrishnan	Malayalam	
2013	Thirumathi Thamizh	Jothi	Tamil	Also producer
2015	Sagaptham	Lakshmi	Tamil	
2015	Strawberry	Shanthi Aadhiraj	Tamil	
2016	Janatha Garage	Prabha Sathyam	Telugu	
2017	My School	Mahalakshmi	Malayalam	
2018	Aravinda Sametha Veera Raghava	Suguna	Telugu	
2018	Ezhumin	Bharathi	Tamil	
2018	Kalavani Mappillai	Rajeswari	Tamil	
2019	NTR: Kathanayakudu	Akkineni Annapurna	Telugu	
2021	Love Story	Mounica's mother	Telugu	
2021	Madhagaja	Rathnamma	Kannada	
2023	Anuragam	Mercy	Malayalam	
2024	Devaki Nandana Vasudeva	Devaki	Telugu	
2025	Nizharkudai	Jothi	Tamil	
2025	3BHK	Shanthi Vasudevan	Tamil	winner Behindwoods gold icon Best lead role Female Provoke Award Best Character artist Female
2025	Kiss	Daisy Marcus	Tamil	

Key
†	Denotes films that have not yet been released

== Television ==
=== Serials ===
Year	Serial	Role	Language	Channel
2003–2009	Kolangal	Abinaya(Abi)	Tamil	Sun TV
2007–2008	Manjal Magimai	Soundarya/Neeraja	Tamil	Kalaignar TV
2010–2011	Kodi Mullai	Anna Kodi/Malar Kodi	Tamil	Raj TV
2011–2013	Muthaaram	Ranjini Devi / Sivaranjani	Tamil	Sun TV
2019–2020	Rasaathi	Illavarasi Soundaravalli	Tamil	Sun TV
2021–2022	Pudhu Pudhu Arthangal	Lakshmi	Tamil	Zee Tamil
2021	Sembaruthi	Amman (Cameo)	Tamil	Zee Tamil
2023	Maari	Muthupechi (Cameo)	Tamil	Zee Tamil

=== Shows ===
Year	Serial	Role	Language	Notes
2015–2016	Ugram Ujjwalam season 2	Judge	Malayalam	Mazhavil Manorama
2016–2017	Jodi Number One	Judge	Tamil	Vijay TV
2017	Junior Super Stars Season 2	Judge	Tamil	Zee Tamil
2022	Pudhu Pudhu Arthangal Niraivu Vizha	Lakshmi	Tamil	Zee Tamil

=== As director ===
==== Short film ====
Year	Film	Notes	Ref.
2024	Kaikuttai Rani		

== Awards and honours ==
Year	Award category	Work	Result
1996	Tamil Nadu State Film Special Award for Best Actress	Kaadhal Kottai	Won
1997	Tamil Nadu State Film Award for Best Actress	Surya Vamsam	Won
2000	Tamil Nadu State Film Award for Best Actress	Bharathi	Won
2000	Kalaimamani Award by Tamil Nadu Government	Contribution to Tamil Cinema	Won
2002	ITFA Best Supporting Actress Award	Azhagi	Won
2004	Pace Awards Best Television Actress	Kolangal	Won
2004	Vivel Chinna Thirai Awards Best Actress	Kolangal	Nominated
2007	Tamil Nadu State Television Award for Best Actress	Kolangal	Won
2025	Best Short Film for Children	Kaikuttai Rani	Won
