= Archanai Pookal =

- Directed by: Gokula Krishnan
- Written by: Gokula Krishnan
- Produced by: K. Gopinathan
- Starring: Chandrasekhar; Mohan; Rajyalakshmi; Subhathra
- Cinematography: Jayanan Vincent
- Edited by: T. Sekar
- Music by: Ilaiyaraaja
- Production company: Bagavathy Creations
- Release date: 15 October 1982
- Country: India
- Language: Tamil

Archanai Pookal (transl. Sacred flowers) is a 1982 Indian Tamil-language film written and directed by Gokula Krishnan, starring Chandrasekhar, Mohan, Rajyalakshmi and Subathra. The film was released on 15 October 1982, and failed at the box office.

== Cast ==
- Chandrasekhar
- Mohan
- Rajyalakshmi
- Subhathra
- Sangili Murugan
- Manorama
- Poornam Viswanathan
- Senthil

== Production ==
Archanai Pookkal marked the directorial debut of Gokula Krishnan who earlier assisted K. Bhagyaraj.

== Soundtrack ==
The music was composed by Ilaiyaraaja.

| Song | Singers | Lyrics | Length |
|---|---|---|---|
| "Aavaram Kaatukul" | Malaysia Vasudevan, Uma Ramanan | Kannadasan | 04:16 |
| "Kaveriye" | S. P. Balasubrahmanyam, S. Janaki | Gangai Amaran | 04:17 |
| "Naduchamam Poyachu" | Malaysia Vasudevan, R. Bhaskar | Vaali | 04:43 |
| "Vazhimel Vizhiyaal" | S. Janaki | Vaali | 04:23 |
| "Paappa Pacha" | Malaysia Vasudevan, P. Susheela | Gangai Amaran | 04:25 |

== Reception ==
Sindhu-Jeeva of Kalki praised the film for pleasant visuals, beautiful music but panned the editing and unnecessary symbolic shots.
