= Muthu Kalai =

- Title card
- Directed by: Gokula Krishnan
- Written by: Gokula Krishnan
- Produced by: Raadhika Reddy
- Starring: Karthik; Soundarya
- Cinematography: Jayanan Vincent
- Edited by: T. R. Shekar; K. R. Gowrishankar
- Music by: Ilaiyaraaja
- Production company: Shri Arkay Film Makers
- Release date: 24 February 1995
- Running time: 145 minutes
- Country: India
- Language: Tamil

Muthu Kalai is a 1995 Indian Tamil-language film written and directed by Gokula Krishnan. The film stars Karthik and Soundarya. It was released on 24 February 1995.

== Plot ==
The film begins with Poochi announcing bad news to Muthu Kaalai. Muthu Kaalai first refuses to see Poonjolai in her deathbed, but he finally accepts.

In the past, Poonjolai was from a rich family in her village, while Muthu Kaalai was a poor herdsman who worked for Raakayi. Since their first meeting, Poonjolai hated him and put him in a lot of troubles. Muthu Kaalai wanted to marry Poonjolai, but her uncles Sakthivel, Sangaiah, and Rathnavel were determined to wipe out his wish.

Later, they unite

== Cast ==
- Karthik as Muthu Kaalai
- Soundarya as Poonjolai
- Napoleon as Sakthivel
- Vijayakumar as Sangaiah, Poonjolai's uncle
- Chandrasekhar as Rathnavel, Poonjolai's father
- Goundamani as Pattayakarar
- Senthil
- Vadivelu as Poochi
- Manorama as Raakayi
- Vadivukkarasi as Deivanai
- Vaishnavi as Maheshwari
- Disco Shanti
- Periya Karuppu Thevar
- Singamuthu

== Soundtrack ==
The music was composed by Ilaiyaraaja, with lyrics written by Vaali.

Song	Singer(s)	Duration
"Antha Kanji Kalaiyatha"	S. P. Balasubrahmanyam, S. Janaki	5:06
"Engey Vaippaaru"	S. P. Balasubrahmanyam, S. Janaki	4:52
"Ereduthu Ereduthu"	S. P. Balasubrahmanyam, Manorama	4:38
"Nalla Kaaram Pasu"	S. P. Balasubrahmanyam	4:29
"Punnai Vanathu Kuyile"	S. P. Balasubrahmanyam, S. Janaki	4:59

== Reception ==
K. Vijayan of New Straits Times stated, "Good acting, characterisation and the director's skills at telling a run-of-the-mill story make this in an above-average movie".
