= Nee Varuvai Ena =

1999 film by Rajakumaran

- Theatrical release poster
- Directed by: Rajakumaran
- Written by: Rajakumaran
- Produced by: R. B. Choudary
- Starring: Parthiban; Devayani
- Cinematography: Agilan
- Edited by: V. Jaishankar
- Music by: S. A. Rajkumar
- Production company: Super Good Films
- Release date: 14 August 1999
- Running time: 159 minutes
- Country: India
- Language: Tamil

Nee Varuvai Ena (transl. Will you come for me?) is a 1999 Indian Tamil-language romantic drama film written and directed by Rajakumaran. The film stars Parthiban and Devayani, with Ajith Kumar in a guest appearance. Ramesh Khanna, Vijayakumar, Fathima Babu, Jai Ganesh, and Sathyapriya also play important roles.

Nee Varuvai Ena released on 14 August 1999 to positive reviews and became a commercial success. It was later remade in Telugu as Ninne Premistha (2000), in Kannada Ninne Preethisuve (2002) and in Malayalam as Pranayamanithooval (2002).

== Plot ==
Ganesh, is the only son of Mudaliar-Gounder inter-caste parents in Chennai. He loses several prospective brides due to this and spends his time dreaming of marriage, despite being an Assistant Bank manager in a Govt bank. On a bus ride to Chengalpattu to take up a promotion as a bank manager in Chengalpattu, he gets involved in an accident. The scene shifts to 4 months later when he finally shows up at Vendanthangal. Nandhini, the only daughter of Village president, who lives in the house opposite to his, showers affection on him, gives him coffee, provides him with hot water, etc. Ganesh falls in love with Nandhini and weeks later visits her family with his parents to talk about marriage. However, she rejects the proposal without telling the reason.

Nandhini is met by Ganesh in a hilltop and cornered for the reason behind rejection. She tells him about her ill-fated love affair with army officer Subramani. Subramani and Nandhini's wedding was planned, with their courtship being very sweet. A week before the wedding, Subramani was recalled to the forces, due to an unknown clerical error. While going to the station, their car meets with a freak accident which results in the deaths of Subramani and his parents, while Nandhini suffers a broken leg. Coincidentally, this was the same accident in which the bus Ganesh was travelling met with. Ganesh lost his vision in the accident, and Subramani's eyes had been donated to Ganesh. Nandhini came to know this in the hospital which made her fall in love with his eyes. This was the reason for her attachment to Ganesh.

Eager to send him on his way, Nandhini sends a letter in Ganesh's name to Ganesh's home, accepting the latest girl whom they picked for him. Ganesh returns home to find arrangements for his wedding in full swing. Coincidentally, the girl turns out to be Subalakshmi, someone he had dreamed of marrying during his pre-Nandini days. However, Ganesh cancels the wedding plans, and his friend marries Subalakshmi. Ganesh returns to Vendanthangal. In the end, it is shown that Ganesh and Nandhini remain good friends without getting married.

== Cast ==
- Parthiban as Ganesh
- Devayani as Nandhini
- Jai Ganesh as Ramasamy, Ganesh's father
- Sathyapriya as Lakshmi, Ganesh's mother
- Crane Manohar as Maarisamy
- Ramesh Khanna as Ramesh, Ganesh's friend
- Vadivukkarasi as Sivagami, Nandhini's mother
- Vaiyapuri as Mani
- Madhan Bob as Kesavan
- Shanmugasundaram as Rajadurai, Nandhini's father
- Singamuthu as Muthu
- T. S. Raghavendra as Santhanam, Subalakshmi's father
- Gowthami Vembunathan as Nurse Rekha
- Master Mahendran
- Saranya Nag (child artiste)
- Ajith Kumar as Subramani (guest appearance)
- Vijayakumar as Rathnavelu Gounder, Subramani's father (guest appearance)
- Fathima Babu as Kamatchi, Subramani's mother (guest appearance)
- Suvalakshmi as Subalakshmi (guest appearance)
- Kanal Kannan as bus passenger (guest appearance)

== Production ==
The film was written by and marked the directorial debut of Rajakumaran, who had earlier assisted director Vikraman. Initially Vijay was offered the main lead role, he liked the story but wished to act in the role offered to Ajith Kumar but as Ajith refused to change the role, Vijay left the film and the main lead role went to Parthiban.

== Soundtrack ==
The music was composed by S. A. Rajkumar.

Track listing
No.	Title	Lyrics	Singer(s)	Length
1.	"Oru Devathai Vanthu Vittaal" (male)	Ra. Ravishankar	Hariharan	4:45
2.	"Paarthu Paarthu Kangal" (female)	Pa. Vijay	K. S. Chithra	4:33
3.	"Poonguil Paattu Pidichirukka"	Viveka	Arunmozhi, Harini	4:07
4.	"Athikaalaiyil Sevalai"	Ramesh Vaidya	Sujatha, P. Unnikrishnan	4:44
5.	"Oru Devathai Vanthu Vittaal" (female)	Ra. Ravishankar	K. S. Chithra	4:09
6.	"Paarthu Paarthu Kangal" (male)	Pa. Vijay	S. P. Balasubrahmanyam	4:31
Total length:				26:49

== Release and reception ==
Nee Varuvai Ena released on 14 August 1999. Kala Krishnan Ramesh of Deccan Herald wrote, "Parthiban is not bad at all, Devayani, if you can overlook the aura of sickening sweetness about her is alright too. Ajith doesn`t have much to do, but is pleasant while he`s there. Ramesh Khanna fills in the comedy, which you can manage to overlook". The New Indian Express wrote "The plot is almost always predictable, and at times, even degenerates into blatant stupidity. But the director presents all this with such a straight face, that you find yourself lapping it all up". Kalki wrote that though the director managed the first half, he successfully made them fail in examination by testing their patience in the second half. Rajakumaran went on to win the Tamil Nadu State Film Award for Best Story Writer.
