= Poovarasan =

- VCD cover
- Directed by: Gokula Krishnan
- Screenplay by: Gokula Krishnan
- Story by: G. Kavitha
- Produced by: M. Gafar
- Starring: Karthik; Rachna Banerjee
- Cinematography: Jayanan Vincent
- Edited by: K R Gowri Shankar; T R Sekar
- Music by: Ilaiyaraaja
- Production company: Taj International
- Release date: 9 August 1996
- Running time: 140 minutes
- Country: India
- Language: Tamil

Poovarasan is a 1996 Indian Tamil-language masala film directed by Gokula Krishnan, starring Karthik and Rachna Banerjee. The film was released on 9 August 1996. This is Banerjee's debut Tamil film.

== Plot ==
Ukrapandi, after consulting an astrologer, ordered Govind to kill his baby in order to save his wife's life. Govind gives the baby to Sudalai and orders him to kill the baby. 25 years later, Poovarasan was recruited by Govind to work. Poovarasan and Kaveri fall in love with each other. One day, Poovarasan saves Senadhipathy.

Senadhipathy's son Sinrasu and Ukrapandi's daughter Sundari fall in love. Their parents then agree to the marriage. Before the marriage, Senadhipathy reminds Ukrapandi of his stinging humiliation and orders Ukrapandi to do the same thing. He refuses to do so and the marriage is subsequently cancelled.

While Senadhipathy's son is getting married, Poovarasan stops it and takes him to marry Sundari. The village's chiefs then decide to exonerate the new married couple and teach a lesson to Poovarasan. Poovarasan must attend the "Bhoomi Pooja": the ritual before the construction of any structure.

Meanwhile, an old man, pretending to be Poovarasan's father, is recognised by Govind. Sudalai could not kill the baby and the baby was in fact, Poovarasan. Senadhipathy wants to take revenge on Ukrapandi's family, so he sends his henchmen to kill them. Poovarasan saves them, but he dies by a gunshot.

== Cast ==
- Karthik as Poovarasan
- Rachna Banerjee as Kaveri
- Vijayakumar as Ukrapandi
- Sujatha as Ukrapandi's wife / Govind's sister
- Radha Ravi as Senadhipathy
- Goundamani as Govind
- Senthil as Samuthiram
- Chandrasekhar as Sudalai
- Thalapathi Dinesh as Houseworker

== Soundtrack ==
The music was composed by Ilaiyaraaja, with lyrics by Vaali.

Song	Singer(s)	Duration
"Rasa Magan Raasanukku"	S P Balasubrahmanyam, K S Chitra	5:07
"Raasaathi"	S P Balasubrahmanyam, K S Chitra	5:00
"Intha Poovukku Oru"	S P Balasubrahmanyam, K S Chitra	5:12
"Kattikidalaam"	S P Balasubrahmanyam, K S Chitra	5:15
"Pottu Vacha Kiliye"	S P Balasubrahmanyam	4:50
"Aarambam Nalla"	Malaysia Vasudevan, Devie Neithiyar	4:37

== Reception ==
D. S. Ramanujam of The Hindu wrote, "None could find fault with Karthik's portrayal, taking on a slightly heavy role with convincing ease". R. P. R. of Kalki praised Ilaiyaraaja's music and Goundamani's humour and concluded with just enough love, enough sentiment, fights, a little bit of sadness, a lot of comedy, all the proportions are right, however the mixed vessel is taken from the museum.
