= Pannaiyar =

Hindu caste of Tamil Nadu, South India

Pannaiyar, or Alagar, is a Hindu caste of Tamil Nadu, India. Most of the caste's members are in Tamil Nadu, primarily in the Thoothukudi district and some in Kanyakumari, Tirunelveli and Ramanathapuram districts.
