= Rajakumaran (director) =

Indian actor (1999–2017)

- Born: Santhipalayam, Anthiyur, Erode, Tamil Nadu, India
- Occupations: Film director; actor
- Years active: 1993–2017
- Spouse: Devayani (m. 2001)
- Children: Iniya Rajakumaran, Priyanka Rajakumaran

Rajakumaran is an Indian film director, who has made Tamil films. He is married to actress Devayani, who he has collaborated with in all his films.

== Career ==
Rajakumaran, an assistant to director Vikraman, made his debut with Nee Varuvai Ena (1999), a romance story produced by R. B. Choudary. The film starring Parthiban and Devayani won positive reviews and commercial success, being described as "a film definitely worth watching" by a critic from Indolink.com, who cites that "it is bound to touch your heart and make you wonder about the power of love." A reviewer from the Indian Express wrote "The plot is almost always predictable, and at times, even degenerates into blatant stupidity. But the director presents all this with such a straight face, that you find yourself lapping it all up". The film went on to win the Tamil Nadu State Film Award for Best Storywriter for Rajakumaran. He then briefly began working on another project titled Devathai Vanthuvittaal, and then started and shelved a film titled Aanavam, which was to feature Sathyaraj, Khushbu and Roja.

After the success of Nee Varuvai Ena, Rajakumaran was given a chance by R. B. Choudary to make another film under his banner. The project was titled as Vinnukum Mannukum (2001), with an ensemble cast featuring Vikram, Devayani, Sarathkumar and Khushbu. In an interview in 2008, Vikram mentioned his displeasure at being a part of it, claiming that he had arguments with the director for every single shot and that "everything in that film, right from the first shot was wrong". Furthermore, Rajakumaran failed to utilize the call sheets of Sarathkumar and this caused some delay in finishing off the shootings, taking over a year to complete. The film received mixed reviews with a critic from The Hindu noting: "director Rajakumaran has taken special care in the choice of songs and locations to make the film entertaining. He should have paid more attention to the first half and more important, must have extracted more work from Vikram, who has the potential, and Devayani, for whom it is a cakewalk".

He next chose to direct and produce a film titled Kadhaludan (2003) with Murali in the lead role. The film won mixed reviews with a critic from Sify noting: "the plot is idiotic, as director Rajakumaran has tried to rehash his earlier film Nee Varuvai Ena" and described the film as tedious. Another review from The Hindu described the film as a neat family drama, adding that: "The screenplay is hampered mainly by lengthy, meandering dialogue that proves tiresome". The failure of the films prompted Rajakumaran to take a sabbatical from film-making and briefly worked as a film distributor. Along with his wife, they then launched another production Thirumathi Thamizh in February 2008, with Rajakumaran playing the lead role and Devayani starring opposite him. The film, after much delay, released to mixed reviews in April 2013.

== Personal life ==
He married actress Devayani in April 2001 in a secret marriage at Thiruthani Murugan Temple. The pair had fallen in love during the production of his first two films.

They have two children, Iniya and Priyanka.

== Filmography ==
=== Director ===
Year	Film	Notes	Ref(s)
1999	Nee Varuvai Ena	Tamil Nadu State Film Award for Best Storywriter	
2001	Vinnukkum Mannukkum		
2003	Kadhaludan	Tamil Nadu State Film Award for Best Family Film	
2004	Shivaram	Telugu film	
2013	Thirumathi Thamizh		

=== Actor ===
Year	Film	Role	Notes
1993	Naan Pesa Ninaipathellam		Uncredited
1996	Poove Unakkaga	Cyclist	Uncredited
1997	Suryavamsam	Bus passenger	Uncredited
2013	Thirumathi Thamizh	Thamizhselvan	
2014	Vallavanukku Pullum Aayudham	Raj	
2017	Kadugu	Pandi	
