= List of Tamil films of 1995 =

Post-amendment to the Tamil Nadu Entertainments Tax Act 1939 on 1 April 1958, Gross jumped to 140 per cent of Nett Commercial Taxes Department disclosed ₹98 crore in entertainment tax revenue for the year.

A list of films produced in the Tamil film industry in India in 1995 by release date:

== Movies ==
| Opening | | Title | Director | Cast | Production | Ref. |
|---|---|---|---|---|---|---|
| J A N | 15 | Karuppu Nila | R. Aravindraj | Vijayakanth, Khushbu, Ranjitha | Rowther Films | |
| J A N | 15 | Engirundho Vandhan | Santhana Bharathi | Sathyaraj, Roja, Aamani | V. S. R. Pictures | |
| J A N | 15 | Baashha | Suresh Krissna | Rajinikanth, Nagma, Shashikumar, Raghuvaran | Sathya Movies | |
| J A N | 15 | Kattumarakaran | P. Vasu | Prabhu, Eva Grover, Sanghavi | A. G. S. Movies | |
| J A N | 15 | Naan Petha Magane | V. Sekhar | Nizhalgal Ravi, Raadhika, Urvashi, Manorama | Manithalayam Productions | |
| J A N | 15 | Oru Oorla Oru Rajakumari | K. Bhagyaraj | K. Bhagyaraj, Meena | Indrani Movies | |
| J A N | 15 | Sathi Leelavathi | Balu Mahendra | Kamal Haasan, Ramesh Aravind, Kalpana, Heera, Kovai Sarala | Raaj Kamal Films International | |
| J A N | 15 | Veluchami | Arul | Sarath Kumar, Vineetha, Shruthi | Lakshmi Movie Makers | |
| F E B | 3 | Gangai Karai Paattu | Manivannan | Varun Raj, Roopa Sri, Manivannan | Kokkintha Cine Arts | |
| F E B | 10 | Mudhal Udhayam | Prithviraj | Arjun, Suman Ranganathan | Mother Cine Productions | |
| F E B | 10 | Paattu Padava | B. R. Vijayalakshmi | S. P. Balasubrahmanyam, Rahman, Lavanya | Kiran Films | |
| F E B | 10 | Valli Vara Pora | S. V. Solai Raja | Pandiarajan, Mohana, Nirosha | Greenways Film International | |
| F E B | 15 | Raja Muthirai | R. K. Selvamani | Arun Pandian, Roja, Vineetha | Varshini Pictures | |
| F E B | 17 | Deva | S. A. Chandrasekhar | Vijay, Swathi | B. V. Combines | |
| F E B | 17 | Kizhakku Malai | Ganesh Ramana | Anand, Suvarna Mathew | R. R. Film Units | |
| F E B | 24 | Muthu Kaalai | Gokula Krishnan | Karthik, Soundarya | Sri R. K. Film Makers | |
| F E B | 24 | Thottil Kuzhandhai | S. P. Muthuraman | Ramki, Ranjitha | Meena Movies | |
| M A R | 3 | Chinna Mani | M. Thilakarajan | Napoleon, Kasthuri | Shivashree Pictures | |
| M A R | 3 | Kalyanam | R. Narayanan | Vishnu, Vinodhini | Sree Parthasarathy Perumal Pictures | |
| M A R | 3 | Manathile Oru Paattu | Gnanamozhi | Vignesh, Saradha Preetha | Mozhi Movies | |
| M A R | 3 | Puthiya Aatchi | Velu Prabhakaran | Anandaraj, Raadhika, Radha Ravi, Sarath Babu | Jayadevi Films | |
| M A R | 10 | Bombay | Mani Ratnam | Arvind Swamy, Manisha Koirala | Aalayam Productions | |
| M A R | 10 | Muthu Kulikka Vaarieyala | K. S. Ravikumar | Vignesh, Khushbu, Sanghavi | Thirumoorthy Films | |
| M A R | 10 | Raja Enga Raja | T. Vijayasingaam | Goundamani, Ramya Krishnan | M. R. Movies | |
| M A R | 10 | Thondan | Karvannan | Murali, Rohini | R. K. Film Makers Circuit | |
| M A R | 11 | Aanazhagan | Thyagarajan | Prashanth, Suneha | Supreme Films International | |
| M A R | 14 | Dharmangal Sirikkinrana | A. Kasilingam | Ravichandran, Srividya | Pachai Nayagi Films | |
| M A R | 15 | Udhavum Karangal | Shanmuga Priyan | Raadhika, G. D. Ramesh, Anuja | Radhi Films | |
| A P R | 24 | Coolie | P. Vasu | Sarath Kumar, Meena, Goundamani | Seventh Channel Communications | |
| A P R | 24 | Ellame En Rasathan | Rajkiran | Rajkiran, Sangita, Roopa Sri | Red Sun Art Creations | |
| A P R | 24 | En Pondatti Nallava | Senthilnathan | Napoleon, Khushbu | Ramakrishna Movie Makers | |
| A P R | 24 | Karnaa | Selva | Arjun, Ranjitha, Vineetha | Vijaya Madhavi Combines | |
| A P R | 24 | Lucky Man | Prathap K. Pothan | Karthik, Sanghavi, Goundamani | Prashath Art Movies | |
| A P R | 24 | Padikkara Vayasula | Jameen Raj | Pandiarajan, Kaveri | Valli Cine Arts | |
| A P R | 24 | Pasumpon | Bharathiraja | Sivaji Ganesan, Sivakumar, Prabhu, Raadhika, Saranya Ponvannan, Vignesh, Yuvarani | Ananthi Films | |
| A P R | 24 | Thai Thangai Paasam | T. Rajendar | T. Rajendar, Sithara | Thanjai Cine Arts | |
| M A Y | 11 | Indira | Suhasini Maniratnam | Arvind Swamy, Anu Haasan, Nassar | GV Films | |
| M A Y | | Thirumoorthy | Pavithran | Vijayakanth, Ravali | M. G. Pictures | |
| M A Y | 12 | Chellakannu | N. Rathnam | Vignesh, Yuvarani | Poornima Shankar Enterprises | |
| M A Y | 14 | Mogamul | Gnana Rajasekaran | Abhisek, Archana Joglekar | J. R. Film Circuit | |
| M A Y | 15 | Nandhavana Theru | R. V. Udayakumar | Karthik, Srinidhi | Amma Creations | |
| M A Y | 19 | Murai Maman | Sundar C | Jayaram, Khushbu, Goundamani | Ganga Gowri Productions | |
| J U N | 9 | Avatharam | Nassar | Nassar, Revathi | Kamalam Movies | |
| J U N | 9 | Sandhaikku Vandha Kili | M. S. Raja Annadurai | Sarathraj, Sivaranjani | Sri Raja Rajeshwari Film Corporation | |
| J U N | 23 | Rani Maharani | Liyakat Ali Khan | Raghuvaran, Raadhika | Evergreen Movies | |
| J U N | 23 | Villadhi Villain | Sathyaraj | Sathyaraj, Nagma | Raj Films International | |
| J U N | 29 | Thamizhachi | S. Asokan | Napoleon, Ranjitha, Revathi | K. P. S. Films International | |
| J U L | 7 | Anbu Magan | Shanmuga Sundaram | Bharath Kumar, Sanghavi | Everest Super Films | |
| J U L | 7 | Anjathavan | D. Raymond | D. Raymond, Sophy Salmon | Haars Group | |
| J U L | 7 | Marumagan | Manivasagam | Karthik, Meena | K. B. Films | |
| J U L | 7 | Thedi Vandha Raasa | Bhoopathi Raja | Ramarajan, Khushbu | Theradhi Films | |
| J U L | 14 | Pullakuttikaran | R. Parthiepan | R. Parthiepan, Sangita, Urvashi | Ammu Movies | |
| J U L | 14 | Witness | Thakkali Srinivasan | Nizhalgal Ravi, Gautami, Aamani | D. G. S. Media Symptoms | |
| J U L | 21 | Asuran | Velu Prabhakaran | Arun Pandian, Roja | Motherland Movies International | |
| J U L | 21 | Gandhi Pirantha Mann | R. Sundarrajan | Vijayakanth, Revathi, Ravali | Tamil Annai Cine Creations | |
| J U L | 21 | Paattu Vaathiyar | T. P. Gajendran | Ramesh Aravind, Ranjitha | Sree Navalady Creations | |
| J U L | 29 | Chakravarthy | M. Bhaskar | Karthik, Bhanupriya | Oscar Movies | |
| A U G | 5 | Rajavin Parvaiyile | Janaki Soundar | Vijay, Indraja, Ajith Kumar | Sri Masani Amman Movies | |
| A U G | 8 | Aval Potta Kolam | K. Vijayan | Rajesh, Ambika | D. N. Combines | |
| A U G | 12 | Mayabazar | K. R. | Ramki, Urvashi, Suvarna Mathew | P. A. Art Productions | |
| A U G | 17 | Vishnu | S. A. Chandrasekhar | Vijay, Sanghavi | Oscar Movies | |
| A U G | 19 | Nadodi Mannan | Manivasagam | Sarath Kumar, Meena | Raja Pushpa Pictures | |
| A U G | 24 | Raasaiyya | P. Kannan | Prabhu Deva, Roja | Amma Creations | |
| S E P | 1 | Periya Kudumbam | K. S. Ravikumar | Prabhu, Kanaka, Vineetha | Ravi Shankar Films | |
| S E P | 8 | Aasai | Vasanth | Ajith Kumar, Suvalakshmi, Prakash Raj | Aalayam Productions | |
| S E P | 8 | Mr. Madras | P. Vasu | Prabhu, Sukanya, Vineetha | Lakshmi Movie Makers | |
| S E P | 15 | Kolangal | I. V. Sasi | Jayaram, Khushbu | Carolina Films | |
| S E P | 15 | Sindhu Bath | Balu Anand | Mansoor Ali Khan, Kasthuri, Sanghavi | Manithan Cine Arts | |
| S E P | 22 | Mannukku Mariyadhai | T. R. Vijayan | Vignesh, Sanghavi | J. K. S. Films | |
| S E P | 22 | Thaikulame Thaikulame | N. Murugesh | Pandiarajan, Vinaya Prasad, Urvashi | Ananth Cine Arts | |
| S E P | 23 | Aakaya Pookal | Deenadayal | Murali, Napoleon, Kasthuri | Vinothram International | |
| O C T | 6 | Ilavarasi | Selva Vinayagam | Rajachander, Indhumathi, Vijayakumar, Anju | Raghavendra Network | |
| O C T | 23 | Chandralekha | Nambhiraaj | Vijay, Vanitha Vijayakumar, Sindhu | Shri Sairam Arts (P) Ltd. | |
| O C T | 23 | Kuruthipunal | P. C. Sreeram | Kamal Haasan, Arjun, Gautami, Geetha | Raaj Kamal Films International | |
| O C T | 23 | Makkal Aatchi | R. K. Selvamani | Mammootty, Roja, Ranjitha | Aarthi International | |
| O C T | 23 | Muthu | K. S. Ravikumar | Rajinikanth, Meena, Sarath Babu, Subhashri | Kavithalayaa Productions | |
| O C T | 23 | Neela Kuyil | Alleppey Ashraf | Pandiarajan, Rajashree | Annu Pictures | |
| O C T | 23 | Ragasiya Police | R. S. Ilavarasan | Sarath Kumar, Nagma | A. N. S. Film International | |
| N O V | 17 | Maa Manithan | Mardhananda | Napoleon, Vineetha | Nivedhitha Cine Arts | |
| N O V | 24 | Seethanam | R. Sundarrajan | Prabhu, Sangita, Ranjitha | Amma Creations | |
| N O V | 24 | Ayudha Poojai | C. Sivakumar | Arjun, Urvashi, Roja | Bhagyam Cine Combines | |
| D E C | 1 | Ilaya Ragam | P. R. Devaraj | Jothi Shankar, Sirisha | Pournami Film International | |
| D E C | 2 | Maaman Magal | Guru Dhanapal | Sathyaraj, Meena, Goundamani | A. G. S. Movies | |
| D E C | 14 | Jameen Kottai | Ramchandar | Kalaipuli G. Sekaran, Seetha | Thiraiparavai | |
| D E C | 14 | Varraar Sandiyar | N. K. Viswanathan | Prem, Khushbu | Sree Rajakaliamman Cine Arts | |
| D E C | 15 | Ilaimaikku Oru Etcharikkai | S. Manikandan | Bhaskaran, Poovitha | Sanjaykumar Films | |
| D E C | 15 | Murai Mappillai | Sundar C | Arunkumar, Kirthika | Anbalaya Films | |
| D E C | 15 | Thotta Chinungi | K. S. Adhiyaman | Karthik, Revathi, Raghuvaran, Rohini, Nagendra Prasad, Devayani | Span Vision | |
| D E C | 16 | Mannai Thottu Kumbidanum | R. Umashankar | Selva, Keerthana | Sree Renukaambika Movies | |
| D E C | 21 | Dear Son Maruthu | M. Solai Rajendran | Rahman, Sivakumar, Soundarya | Madhans Movie Creations | |
