= E. Ramdoss =

Indian film director, screenwriter and actor (died 2023)

- Born: Villupuram
- Died: 23 January 2023
- Occupations: Director, actor, screenwriter
- Years active: 1979–2023

E. Ramdoss (died 23 January 2023) was an Indian film director, screenwriter and actor who worked on Tamil films.

== Career ==
Ramdoss moved to Mylapore, Chennai in late 1979, attempting to make a career in the Tamil film industry where he became acquainted with then budding film maker Manobala, who was his neighbour. Ramdoss then worked with director P. S. Nivas on his first screenplay, and was given the writing credits for Enakkaga Kaathiru (1981) which starred Suman and Sumalatha. After working with Nivas, Ramdoss moved on to collaborate as an assistant director to Manivannan for six films, before moving on to work for producer Kovai Thambi for Motherland Pictures. The success of several of Thambi's films meant that he offered Ramdoss an opportunity to make his directorial debut through Aayiram Pookkal Malarattum (1986) which starred Mohan and Seetha. Despite a publicised fallout between the producer and the original music composer Ilaiyaraaja, the film became a success commercially. His next film Raaja Raajathan (1989) featured Ramarajan and Gautami, and also did well at the box office.

Failing to get opportunities to work with bigger stars, Ramdoss next made two films with actor Mansoor Ali Khan, by helming the action drama Ravanan (1994) and the political satire, Vaazhga Jananayagam (1996). He also later got the opportunity to direct a portion in the multi-starrer Suyamvaram (1999), which was shot within 24 hours, and was made in charge of filming the track between Pandiarajan and Kasthuri.Apart from his credits as director, Ramdoss often collaborated with other film makers as a writer and contributed to films including Makkal Aatchi (1995), "Sangamam" and Kanda Naal Mudhal (2005). He later began to get opportunities as an actor following his role as a ward boy in Vasool Raja MBBS (2004). He has since appeared as a police officer in Yuddham Sei (2011), Kakki Sattai (2015), Visaranai (2016), Dharma Durai (2016) and Vikram Vedha (2017) amongst other projects.

== Death ==
Ramdoss died of a heart attack on 23 January 2023.

== Filmography ==
=== Director ===
Year	Film	Notes
1986	Aayiram Pookkal Malarattum	
1989	Raaja Raajathan	
1991	Nenjamundu Nermaiyundu	
1994	Ravanan	
1996	Vaazhga Jananayagam	
1999	Suyamvaram	

=== Writer ===
- Enakkaga Kaathiru (1981)
- Ellaichami (1992)
- Pon Vilangu (1993)
- Raja Muthirai (1995)
- Makkal Aatchi (1995)
- Rajali (1996)
- Adimai Changili (1997)
- Dhinamum Ennai Gavani (1997)
- Ini Ellam Sugame (1998)
- Kannathal (1998)
- Harikrishnans (1998) (Dialogues for Tamil version)
- FIR (1998) (Dialogues for Tamil version)
- Anthahpuram (1999)
- Ethirum Pudhirum (1999)
- Sangamam (1999)
- Independence Day (2000) (Dialogues for Tamil version)
- Nee Indri Naan Illai (2000) (Dialogues for Tamil version)
- Kanda Naal Mudhal (2005) - Dialogues only
- Yuga (2006)

=== Actor ===
- Nooravathu Naal (1984) as Museum Attender
- Vasool Raja MBBS (2004)
- Yuddham Sei (2011)
- Cuckoo (2014)
- Oru Oorla Rendu Raja (2014)
- Kaaki Sattai (2015)
- Thiranthidu Seese (2015)
- Visaranai (2016)
- Metro (2016)
- Oru Naal Koothu (2016)
- Vellikizhamai 13am Thethi (2016)
- Dharma Durai (2016)
- 12-12-1950 (2017)
- Vikram Vedha (2017)
- Thappu Thanda (2017)
- Aramm (2017)
- Palli Paruvathile (2017)
- Aan Devathai (2018)
- Goli Soda 2 (2018)
- Maari 2 (2018)
- Boomerang (2019)
- Mei (2019)
- Miga Miga Avasaram (2019)
- Naadodigal 2 (2020)
- Vellai Yaanai (2021)
- Vidiyadha Iravondru Vendum (2022)
- Agent Kannayiram (2022)
- Varalaru Mukkiyam (2022) as Karthik's grandfather
- Parundhaaguthu Oor Kuruvi (2023) (Posthumous release)
- Sattam En Kaiyil (2024) - Constable Moorthi (Posthumous release)
