= Chembaruthi =

1992 film by R.K. Selvamani

- Poster
- Directed by: R. K. Selvamani
- Written by: R. K. Selvamani; John Amirtharaj (dialogues)
- Produced by: Kovaithambi
- Starring: Prashanth; Roja
- Cinematography: Ravi Yadav
- Edited by: V. Udhayashankar
- Music by: Ilaiyaraaja
- Production company: Motherland Movies
- Distributed by: Balakrishna Pictures
- Release date: 17 April 1992
- Running time: 146 minutes
- Country: India
- Language: Tamil

Chembaruthi (transl. Hibiscus) is a 1992 Indian Tamil-language teen romantic drama film written and directed by R. K. Selvamani and produced by Kovaithambi. The film stars Prashanth and Roja (in her Tamil debut), while P. Bhanumathi, Nassar, Radha Ravi, and Mansoor Ali Khan play supporting roles. It was partially re-shot in Telugu as Chamanti with Satyanarayana replacing M. N. Nambiar. The music was composed by Ilaiyaraaja, while editing was done by V. Udhayashankar and cinematography by Ravi Yadav. The film was released on 17 April 1992 and was a major box office success. It was remade in Bangladeshi as Ontore Ontore and in Hindi as Aao Pyaar Karen (both 1994).

== Plot ==
Raja is the grandson of a rich businesswoman and is settled in London. He comes to a village in India to see his grandmother. Chembaruthi is the sister of a poor fisherman Pandi, who works in Raja's grandmother's house. The couple first sees each other during Raja's birthday party, and it is love at first sight for Raja. They meet often, and their love grows by leaps and bounds. Raja's grandmother wants him to marry Malathy, the daughter of a rich seafood exporter named Murugan. At the party, they announce Raja's interest in Malathy. Raja realises that his relationship with the daughter of a poor fisherman is not taken kindly by his eccentric grandmother, and when she discovers Raja's love for Chembaruthi, she accuses Pandi of using his sister's beauty and charm to trap Raja for his money. She even offers Pandi cash to have Chembaruthi stop seeing Raja. Pandi feels very humiliated by this accusation and reciprocates by insulting Raja's grandmother. Their conversation enters a deadlock, spelling doom for Raja and Chembaruthi's tender love.

Raja's grandmother then engages him to be married to Malathy in order to establish business ties with her rich father. Murugan also has his sister betrothed to a fisherman named Kumar, but Raja and Chembaruthi run away from home. Raja's grandmother announces a reward for anyone who can help find her grandson. Murugan decides that he wants the money. He and his goons find the lovers, abduct them, and lock them up in a boat. Raja fights for Chembaruthi and saves her from drowning in the sea. Raja's grandmother then realises that their love is very strong, and she does not want to stand in the way of their happiness. She and Pandi accept their love and give their blessings to the union.

== Cast ==
- Prashanth as Raja Rathnam
- Roja as Chembaruthi (Voice over by Rohini)
- Bhanumathi as Bhuvaneshwari
- Nassar as Murugan
- Radha Ravi as Pandi
- Vaasavi as Malathi
- Mansoor Ali Khan as Kumar
- M. N. Nambiar as Raja Rathnam, Raja's grandfather
- Satyanarayana as Raja's grandfather (Telugu version)
- Vaishnavi
- Hemalatha
- Anitha
- Adeen Khan as Pinky
- John
- S. Rajasekar as Raja's father

== Production ==
After the success of Captain Prabhakaran (1991), director R. K. Selvamani decided to make a film completely with newcomers which became Chembaruthi. He initially cast debutants such as Raman Kapoor from Mumbai, Suchithra Krishnamurthy and Gayathri (of Aranmanai Kili) in lead roles; however after shooting half of the film, he was unimpressed and scrapped it. Selvamani eventually cast Prashanth and Roja in the lead roles. During the production of Urudhi Mozhi, its producer Ravi Yadav approached Saravanan Sivakumar, later known as Suriya, to portray the lead role in Chembaruthi; however Saravanan's father Sivakumar refused the offer.

== Soundtrack ==
The music was composed by Ilaiyaraaja. He completed the soundtrack within 40 minutes. The song "Chalakku Chalakku" is set to the raga Chakravakam, "Chembaruthi Poovu" is set to Kapi, "Kadalila Ezhumbura Alaigala" is set to Sindhu Bhairavi, "Nadandhal" is set to Keeravani, and "Nila Kayum" is set to Sankarabharanam.

Tamil
No.	Title	Lyrics	Singer(s)	Length
1.	"Chembaruthi Poovu"	Vaali	K. S. Chithra, Mano, Bhanumathi	4:52
2.	"Chalakku Chalakku"	Vaali	S. Janaki, Mano	4:54
3.	"Ada Vanjiram"	Piraisoodan	Malaysia Vasudevan, Chorus	1:12
4.	"Pattu Poove"	Muthulingam	S. Janaki, Mano	5:06
5.	"Nadandhal"	Piraisoodan	S. P. Balasubrahmanyam	5:04
6.	"Nila Kayum"	Vaali	S. Janaki, Mano	4:49
7.	"Kadalile Ezhumbura Alaigala"	Vaali	Ilaiyaraaja	5:01
8.	"Kadile Thanimaiyile"	Piraisoodan	Nagore E. M. Hanifa, Mano	5:06
Total length:				36:04

Telugu (Chamanthi)
No.	Title	Lyrics	Singer(s)	Length
1.	"Chamanthi Pushpa"	Veturi	S. P. Balasubrahmanyam, K. S. Chithra, P. Bhanumathi	5:55
2.	"Ide Rajayogam"	Rajasri	S. P. Balasubrahmanyam, K. S. Chithra	5:13
3.	"Chakkani Chikkani Chilaka"	Rajasri	S. P. Balasubrahmanyam, K. S. Chithra	5:00
4.	"Paala Ponge"	Rajasri	S. P. Balasubrahmanyam, K. S. Chithra	5:16
5.	"Kadale Neeku Thalli Thandri"	Rajasri	S. P. Balasubrahmanyam, K. S. Chithra	5:11
6.	"Neekatha Needile"	Veturi	S. P. Balasubrahmanyam	5:14
7.	"Kadali Meeda Ontariga"	Rajasri	S. P. Balasubrahmanyam, T. Srinivas	5:16
8.	"Vanjaram – Bit"	Rajasri	Malaysia Vasudevan	1:14
Total length:				38:23

== Reception ==
The Indian Express wrote the film is "akin to formula Hindi film" and praised the performances, music and cinematography. Supraja Sridharan of Kalki praised the director for conveying tender romantic feelings in an entertaining manner on the big screen while also praising the cinematography, editing and music.

== Bibliography ==
- Sundararaman (2007) [2005]. Raga Chintamani: A Guide to Carnatic Ragas Through Tamil Film Music (2nd ed.). Pichhamal Chintamani. OCLC 295034757.
