= Kanmani (film) =

Indian film about college rivalry, family secrets, and romance

- Theatrical release poster
- Directed by: R. K. Selvamani
- Screenplay by: R. K. Selvamani
- Story by: P. Kalaimani
- Produced by: T. Sethuraman; T. S. Saravanan
- Starring: Prashanth; Mohini
- Cinematography: Ravi Yadav
- Edited by: V. Udhayashankar
- Music by: Ilaiyaraaja
- Production company: Kalyani Cine Productions
- Release date: 31 July 1994
- Running time: 137 minutes
- Country: India
- Language: Tamil

Kanmani is a 1994 Indian Tamil-language romantic drama film. It was directed by R. K. Selvamani. The film stars Prashanth and Mohini, while Sujatha, Lakshmi and Jaishankar play supporting roles. It was released on 31 July 1994.

== Plot ==
Raja, a student at S.R.M. Engineering College, who faces harassment from a group led by Mohini, who secretly films women in the college bathroom. After several clashes, Prashanth asserts dominance over Mohini, sparking a romance despite their early conflicts. Meanwhile, his sister Lakshmi, a prominent criminal lawyer, seeks revenge against police officer Sujatha and her husband, Judge Jai Shanker, due to a past betrayal. Lakshmi supports smugglers, including liquor baron Mansur Ali Khan, who runs a medical college, to undermine Sujatha. Khan’s daughter also develops feelings for Prashanth, creating a love triangle.

== Cast ==
- Prashanth as Raja
- Mohini as Kanmani
- Jaishankar as Rajasekaran
- Sujatha as Rajalakshmi
- Lakshmi as Gayatri
- Subhashri as Radha
- Mansoor Ali Khan
- Thyagu

== Production ==
According to Mohini, she was forced by Selvamani to do intimate scenes, and though she did not initially consent, she eventually yielded.

== Soundtrack ==
The songs were composed by Ilaiyaraaja.

Song	Singers	Lyrics	Length
"Aasai Idhayam"	Malaysia Vasudevan, S. Janaki	Muthulingam	05:07
"Busilla"	Mano, S. Janaki	Vaali	04:54
"Ennai Parthu"	K. S. Chithra	Muthulingam	05:00
"Madicharu"	Mano, K. S. Chithra	Vaali	05:11
"Netru Vandha Kaatru"	Ilaiyaraaja, S. Janaki	Vaali	04:14
"Oh En Deva Deviye"	S. P. Balasubrahmanyam, Swarnalatha	Pulamaipithan	05:10
"Sariyana Paruppu"	K. S. Chithra	Vaali	04:57
"Udal Thazhuva"	Mano, Minmini	Pulamaipithan	05:07

== Reception ==
K. Vijiyan of New Straits Times called it "just another love story, big on bare flesh appeal".
