= Athiradi =

Athiradi may refer to:

- Athiradi (2015 film), a 2015 Indian Tamil-language film by Balu Anand
- Athiradi (2026 film), a 2026 Indian Malayalam-language film by Arun Anirudhan
