= Arasiyal =

- Poster
- Directed by: R. K. Selvamani
- Written by: R. K. Selvamani; Liaquat Ali Khan (dialogues)
- Starring: Mammootty; Shilpa Shirodkar; Roja
- Cinematography: M. V. Panneerselvam
- Edited by: Udhaya Sankar
- Music by: Vidyasagar
- Production company: Motherland Movies Internationals
- Release date: 12 December 1997
- Running time: 140 minutes
- Country: India
- Language: Tamil

Arasiyal (transl. Politics) is a 1997 Indian Tamil-language political drama film directed by R. K. Selvamani. The film stars Mammootty, Shilpa Shirodkar and Roja. It was released on 12 December 1997.

== Plot ==
Chandrasekhar (Mammootty) is an honest collector who arrests Vikram (Anandaraj), an international terrorist, in Delhi. He's transferred to Madras to eradicate the corruption. Chandrasekhar has two sisters, Priya (Jeeva) and Supriya (Roja). Priya is in love with Marudapandi (Charan Raj), a hopeless police officer and Chandrasekhar's friend. Meanwhile, Chandrasekhar is in love with Anita Sharma (Shilpa Shirodkar), a Punjabi girl, whom he met in Delhi. Venkatraman (Mansoor Ali Khan), a corrupt politician, is suspected by Chandrasekhar for corruption. Chandrasekhar takes actions against his brothers-in-law, Vishnu (Madhan Bob) and Ramkumar (Uday Prakash) and sent them to jail. Chandrasekhar gets a job promotion because his superiors hate his honest work, but he resigned and showed the journalists the corruption proofs of all corrupted politicians. The people becomes angry and beats all corrupted politicians, and Venkatraman's politic party doesn't even win a seat at the parliament. Chandrasekhar gets married with his lover in Punjab. Venkatraman's wife Vasanthi (Pallavi) was sent to jail for corruption. Venkatraman loses all his money and decides to take vengeance. Vikram, released from jail, wants also to revenge Chandrasekhar and becomes friends with Venkatraman. When Vikram decides to kill Chandrasekhar, he sees his sister Anita Sharma and promised her to protect his husband. Venkatraman's henchmen kidnaps Priya; but when she escaped, she fell from the building and died. They also put a bomb in Supriya's handbag which exploded by killing Supriya and Marudapandi. Venkatraman kills Vikram but Chandrasekhar is suspected for Vikram's murder. Chandrasekhar escapes from the police and kills all corrupted politicians. Finally, Chandrasekhar gets applause for his actions, but the court sends him to jail.

== Cast ==
- Mammootty as Chandrasekhar
- Shilpa Shirodkar as Anita Sharma
- Roja as Supriya
- Mansoor Ali Khan as Venkatraman (R. K. V)
- Anandaraj as Vikram (guest appearance)
- Charan Raj as Marudapandi
- Jeeva as Priya
- Jai Ganesh as Shanmugasundaram, Chandrasekhar's father
- Sumithra as Chandrasekhar's mother
- John Amirtharaj as the Chief Minister
- Thyagu as Thiruvasagam
- Madhan Bob as Vishnu
- Uday Prakash as Ramkumar
- Pallavi as Vasanthi

== Production ==
After the success of Makkal Aatchi, the actor Mammootty and director Selvamani reunited for another political film titled Arasiyal. The director, prior to release, played down any potential controversial story plots and indicated it would be more about a politician's personal life rather than his work. The team shot across North India in 1997 with scenes also filmed at the Golden Temple, Punjab. The film's shoot was delayed for few months due to poor health of Mammootty and Jai Ganesh, in addition to the 1997 FEFSI strike.

== Soundtrack ==
The music was composed by Vidyasagar. The film marked the debut of singer Harish Raghavendra in cinema.

| Song | Singer(s) | Lyrics | Duration |
|---|---|---|---|
| "Arasiyal Arasiyal" | Pushpavanam Kuppusamy, Anitha Kuppusamy | Vairamuthu | 3:49 |
| "Hello Nanthalaala" | Sujatha Mohan | Vaasan | 4:19 |
| "Sindhubathi" | Sundar Rajan, Anupama | Vaasan | 5:00 |
| "Vaa Sagi Vaa Sagi" | Harish Raghavendra, Uma Ramanan | Arunmozhi | 4:53 |
| "Varai En Thozhiyae" | S. P. B. Charan, Harini, Shubha Mudgal | Piraisoodan | 4:37 |
| "Varai En Thozhiyae" II | Sujatha Mohan, Swarnalatha, Shubha Mudgal | Piraisoodan | 4:34 |

== Release and reception ==
The film was initially supposed to release in the Diwali season of 1997, but got postponed to 12 December. Ji of Kalki praised the performances of Mammootty and Mansoor Ali Khan, Liyakath Ali Khan's dialogues and Panneer Selvam's cinematography but felt since many of the political incidents have been analysed earlier, it feels like watching action replay with no thrills. Despite the film receiving primarily mixed reviews, Mammootty's performance was well noted by critics and fans. The film won the Tamil Nadu State Film Award for Third Best Film. Liaquat Ali Khan received the Dinakaran Award for Best Dialogue writer.
