= M. V. Panneerselvam =

Indian Cinematographer

- Born: Tamil Nadu, India
- Occupation: Cinematographer
- Years active: 1992–present
- Spouse: Madhu
- Awards: Kalaimamani Award (2006)

M. V. Panneerselvam is an Indian cinematographer, who primarily works in the Tamil film industry. He has associated with directors like R. Parthiban, R. K. Selvamani and K. Subash. He has worked as a cinematographer in more than 25 films in Tamil.

== Early life and career ==
After the graduation in Diploma in Film Technology from Adyar Film Institute, he started his career as a cinematographer for the film Unnai Vaazhthi Paadugiren starring R. Parthiepan. He is one of the cinematographers in the Guinness World Record film Suyamvaram, Tamil Dramedy film which is released in 1999, starring an ensemble cast from actors in the Tamil Film Industry and shot by a large technical team from the industry. He is well known for his cinematographic work in films such as Sugamana Sumaigal, Pullakuttikaran, Makkal Aatchi, Abhimanyu, House Full, Roja Koottam etc.

== Awards ==
- Kalaimamani Award - 2006

== Filmography ==
As cinematographer

Year	Movie	
1992	Sugamana Sumaigal	
1993	Ulle Veliye	
1994	Athiradi Padai	Simultaneously shot in Telugu
1995	Pullakuttikaran	
1995	Makkal Aatchi	
1995	Raja Muthirai	
1995	Ayudha Poojai	
1997	Adimai Changili	
1997	Abhimanyu	
1997	Arasiyal	
1998	Ninaivirukkum Varai	
1999	House Full	
1999	Suyamvaram	
1999	Time	
2000	Sudhandhiram	
2001	Nila Kaalam	Telefilm
2002	Roja Koottam	
2002	April Maadhathil	
2003	Chokka Thangam	
2003	Naam	
2004	Devathayai Kanden	
2004	Shock	
2006	Kizhakku Kadarkarai Salai	
2006	Pasa Kiligal	
2006	Perarasu	
2007	Viyabari	
2008	Velli Thirai	
2010	Vandae Maatharam	
2010	Rasikkum Seemane	
2011	Pillaiyar Theru Kadaisi Veedu	
2012	Chaarulatha	
2014	Pongadi Neengalum Unga Kadhalum	
2018	Johnny	
2021	Mirugaa	Also screenwriter
2021	Pei Mama	
2026	Breakfast	
2026	Lakshmikanthan Kolai Vazhakku	
