= Rajali =

- Title card
- Directed by: Velu Prabhakaran
- Written by: E. Ramadoss (dialogues)
- Screenplay by: R. K. Selvamani
- Story by: R. K. Selvamani
- Produced by: R. K. Selvamani
- Starring: Ramki; Napoleon; Roja
- Cinematography: Velu Prabhakaran
- Edited by: V. Udhayashankar
- Music by: Aravind
- Production company: Motherland Movies International
- Release date: 17 April 1996
- Running time: 135 minutes
- Country: India
- Language: Tamil

Rajali (pronounced [ɾaːdʑaːɭi] transl. Bonelli's eagle) is a 1996 Indian Tamil-language action-adventure film directed by Velu Prabhakaran, and written by R. K. Selvamani. The film stars Ramki and Napoleon, while Roja and Mansoor Ali Khan play supporting roles. It was released on 17 April 1996, and did not perform well at the box office.

== Cast ==
- Ramki as Jeeva
- Napoleon as Rajali
- Roja as Rani
- Mansoor Ali Khan as Rani's uncle
- S. S. Rajendran as Shekhar
- Surendra Pal as Rathnavelu
- Vichithra as Rani's friend
- Vadivukkarasi as Rani's mother
- Raja in a guest appearance
- Silk Smitha in a guest appearance
- Disco Shanti in a guest appearance

== Soundtrack ==
The soundtrack was composed by the debutant Aravind and lyrics were written by Piraisoodan.

Song	Singer(s)
"Nee Powerhouse"	Mano, Sindhu
"Kadhal Thamarai"	Suresh Peters, Sujatha
"Wrong Route"	Mansoor Ali Khan, Sujatha

== Release and reception ==
Rajali was released on 17 April 1996. Kalki wrote the film looks like a bunch of good technicians got together and sprayed a bag of garbage. D. S. Ramanujam of The Hindu wrote, "In a cast filled with glamorous dancers, [Selvamani and Velu Prabhakaran] have failed to utilise them in their known abilities and concentrate in giving the necessary pep the narration with the result that everything looks haphazard". However, he also said, "The director's work behind the lens is appreciable especially in the large cave scenes". The film, along with Velu Prabhakaran's other venture Asuran (1995) which released during the same period, did not perform well at the box office.
