= Nerkonda Paarvai =

2019 Indian film by H. Vinoth

- Theatrical release poster
- Directed by: H. Vinoth
- Written by: H. Vinoth; Ritesh Shah
- Story by: Shoojit Sircar; Aniruddha Roy Chowdhury
- Based on: Pink by Aniruddha Roy Chowdhury
- Produced by: Boney Kapoor
- Starring: Ajith Kumar; Shraddha Srinath; Abhirami Venkatachalam; Andrea Tariang
- Cinematography: Nirav Shah
- Edited by: Gokul Chandran
- Music by: Yuvan Shankar Raja
- Production companies: Zee Studios; Bayview Projects LLP
- Distributed by: S Picture; Kandhasamy Arts
- Release date: 8 August 2019
- Running time: 157 minutes
- Country: India
- Language: Tamil
- Box office: est. ₹108–181.45 crore

Nerkonda Paarvai (transl. The Forthright Gaze) is a 2019 Indian Tamil-language legal drama film directed by H. Vinoth. Produced by Boney Kapoor, it is a remake of the Hindi film Pink (2016). The film stars Ajith Kumar, Shraddha Srinath, Abhirami Venkatachalam, and Andrea Tariang (reprising her role from the original). It also features Arjun Chidambaram, Adhik Ravichandran, Aswin Rao, Rangaraj Pandey, Sujith Shankar, Delhi Ganesh, and Jayaprakash in pivotal roles. Nirav Shah is the cinematographer of the film, while Gokul Chandran is the editor.

The film's soundtrack and score were composed by Yuvan Shankar Raja with cinematography by Nirav Shah and editing by Gokul Chandran. The film was released theatrically on 8 August 2019 to positive reviews from critics. It grossed ₹108–181.45 crore worldwide.

== Plot ==
Meera Krishnan, Famitha Banu, and Andrea Tariang are three independent young women living in Chennai who are best friends. One night, they happen to attend a party, enjoying themselves. On the other hand, rich boys Vishwa and Venkatesh take their friend, an injured Adhik Ramajayam, to the hospital. Adhik had been hit in the head and was bleeding profusely. However, the boys decide not to file a police complaint. Meanwhile, the women hurriedly return home from the party, agitated over something, but they try to forget it and carry on with their lives.

During her morning exercise, Meera is observed by Bharath Subramaniam, a grim man living in their neighbourhood who was a successful lawyer and a loving husband to his wife Kalyani years ago. Kalyani had died due to pregnancy complications when Bharath had to leave her alone at home due to an important case. This causes Bharath to break down mentally and retire from his profession, coping with his depression through the use of medications. Bharath senses from the look on Meera's face that something unpleasant has been going on in her life. Later, Meera filed a complaint against Adhik and his friend as they had started causing misery in her friends' lives. Learning of this, Adhik orchestrates a gang to kidnap Meera and molest her, while threatening her to withdraw the complaint. She is later dropped back at home, but is arrested the next day on charges of prostitution and attempted murder by Adhik.

Bharath learns of Meera's plight from her friends and fights the gang that aided Adhik's friends, capturing the main goon and handing him over to the police. He also returns to his profession by offering to help the women by representing them in their cases. Soon, a case is filed. Adhik's side is represented by Sathyamoorthy.

Sathyamoorthy presents the events based on Adhik's allegations that Meera and her friends met Adhik and his friends, and slept with them after having drinks. Adhik is hit on the head by Meera as a result of non-payment, labelling the women as prostitutes. He bases this on the fact that Meera has a family but lives alone, Famitha has a relationship with an older man, and Andrea is moving to Chennai from North India. Meera and her friends deny the allegations and state that the men tried to sexually assault them, prompting Meera to hit Adhik on the head with a bottle in self-defence.

Bharath represents the women and bases their statement on the fact that a woman has the right to say no. Bharath and Sathyamoorthy cross-examine the witnesses and the women individually in the subsequent days, with Bharath's investigation proving successful in favour of the women. Towards the end of the trial, Bharath questions Adhik, who arrogantly says that "girls born in good families don't party or drink." Bharath, however, holds a photo of Adhik's sister attending a party and having drinks in the courtroom, causing Adhik to lose his cool and curse Meera and her friends, stating that they "reaped what they sowed." Consequently, he blurts out that he tried to rape Meera, shocking Sathyamoorthy. Bharath concludes the case by criticising the regressive views of society where women are stereotyped as prostitutes if they come home late, yearn to be independent, drink, and so on, but men are not judged the same way for having similar preferences.

The case ends with Adhik and his friends getting arrested.

== Cast ==
- Ajith Kumar as Adv. Bharath Subramaniam
- Shraddha Srinath as Meera Krishnan
- Abhirami Venkatachalam as Famitha Banu
- Andrea Tariang as Andrea Tariang
- Vidya Balan as Kalyani Bharath (special appearance)
- Arjun Chidambaram as Adhik
- Adhik Ravichandran as Vishwa
- Aswin Rao as Venkatesh
- Rangaraj Pandey as Adv. Sathyamoorthy
- Sujith Shankar as Gavaskar
- Delhi Ganesh as Krishnan
- Jayaprakash as Ramajayam
- D. Ramachandran as the Judge
- Junior Balaiah as Junior
- Uday Mahesh as Commissioner Deepak
- Dinesh Prabhakar as Inspector Kandhasamy
- Sittrarasu as Kathiravan
- Priyadarshini Rajkumar as Meera's senior colleague
- Kishen Das as Andrea's friend
- Mai Pa Narayanan
- Mathew Varghese
- Kumar Natarajan
- Kalpana Shree
- Kalki Koechlin (special appearance in the song "Kaalam")
- Yunohoo (special appearance in the song "Kaalam")

== Production ==
The film was officially launched on 7 December 2018 with a formal pooja in Chennai. Boney Kapoor made his Tamil debut with this film. Actress Vidya Balan made her Tamil debut with this film. It is a remake of the Hindi film Pink. The film producers said that the shooting will start from February 2019 and will hit the theatre screens on 8 August 2019. In January 2019, Kannada actress Shraddha Srinath was finalised to play the role that Taapsee Pannu played in the original version. The film also had Abhirami Venkatachalam. Andrea Tariang, who was also part of the original film, reprised her role. Shooting was finished in early April 2019.

== Music ==
Nerkonda Paarvai

Soundtrack album by Yuvan Shankar Raja
- Released: 8 August 2019
- Genre: Feature film soundtrack
- Language: Tamil
- Label: Zee Music Company
- Producer: Yuvan Shankar Raja

Yuvan Shankar Raja chronology
Kazhugu 2 (2019)	Nerkonda Paarvai (2019)	Hero (2019)

Singles from Nerkonda Paarvai
- 1. "Vaanil Irul" Released: 27 June 2019; 2. "Kaalam" Released: 9 July 2019; 3. "The Theme – Thee Mugan Dhaan" Released: 20 July 2019; 4. "Agalaathey" Released: 25 July 2019

The soundtrack album is scored by Yuvan Shankar Raja in his first collaboration with director H. Vinoth. All the songs were released as singles. The soundtrack rights for the movie were acquired by Zee Music Company.

No.	Title	Lyrics	Singer(s)	Length
1.	"Vaanil Irul"	Uma Devi	Dhee	3:23
2.	"Kaalam"	Nagarjoon R, Yunohoo	Alisha Thomas, Yunohoo	3:38
3.	"The Theme – Thee Mugam Dhaan"	Pa. Vijay	Sathyan, Senthildass Velayutham, Sarath Santhosh	3:07
4.	"Agalaathey"	Pa. Vijay	Prithivee, Yuvan Shankar Raja	4:38

== Reception ==
=== Box office ===
The film has done average in Tamil Nadu and in Chennai. It grossed ₹ 6.70 crore in the first five days in Chennai itself. The film collected ₹45 crore (US$7.01 million) in Tamil Nadu in 4 days and ₹70 crore (US$10.91 million) worldwide in opening weekend. It collected ₹72.5 crore in Tamil Nadu, ₹4.1 crore in Karnataka, ₹1.95 crore in Kerala and ₹20.5 crore overseas. The Times of India published that Nerkonda Paarvai made ₹181.45 crore worldwide, whereas Firstpost stated that the film ended its run with ₹108 crore worldwide. The film entered ₹100 crore crore club in 4 days.

=== Critical response ===
On the review aggregator website Rotten Tomatoes, 100% of 5 critics' reviews are positive, with an average rating of 7.3/10.

We magazine gave the film 4/5 stars, stating "Vinoth has done well to keep the fans engaged. Especially, in the second half of the movie, the courtroom scenes. On the whole, the movie stays true to its original, stays relevant to the current situation. We already know that this movie will be a huge hit and with Ajith as the lead, things only have got better. Once again, huge applause for Ajith. For his acting, for selecting a plot like this." Hindustan Times gave 4/5 stars stating "Ajith and Shraddha Srinath starrer is one of the most socially relevant films to come out of Tamil film industry. Also, it mostly remains true to the story of its Hindi original". Deccan Chronicle gave 4/5 stars stating "A man of Ajith's stature is bound to create ripples in the media and the messages get spread far and wide".

The Times of India gave 3.5/5 stars stating "With arresting performances of artistes and an engaging screenplay which touch upon a sensitive issue, H Vinoth manages to stay true to the original version". Firstpost gave 3.5/5 stars stating "Nerkonda Paarvai is Ajith's best movie in recent times and deserves a watch for its daring theme and presentation". The Indian Express gave 3/5 stars stating "Nerkonda Paarvai is a timely film that could significantly contribute to sensitising people to the plight of the victims of sexual violence. When a big star like Ajith says 'No means No', the impact of the punchline on the audience could be immediate and stronger than what Amitabh Bachchan achieved when he said it the first time."

News18 gave 2.5/5 stars stating "Ajith carries the weight of the film on his shoulders with ease but he refuses to shed his mainstream superstar image completely". Baradwaj Rangan wrote for Film Companion, "In a sense, Nerkonda Paarvai is a companion piece to Viswasam. Once again, Ajith redeems himself by saving a woman after failing to protect one. It's an admirable admission of vulnerability for a megastar...as Bharath, Ajith gives one of his best performances. He is subdued, dignified—like the courtroom scenes".

=== Home media ===
The film became available as VOD on ZEE5 on 19 September 2019, and saw a DVD release in India, the United Kingdom, France, Germany, and Japan.
