= Kuttrapathirikai =

- Title card
- Directed by: R. K. Selvamani
- Written by: R. K. Selvamani
- Produced by: Ravi Yadav
- Starring: Ramki; Rahman; Ramya Krishnan; Roja
- Cinematography: Ravi Yadav
- Music by: Ilaiyaraaja
- Production company: Yadavalaya Films
- Release date: 23 March 2007
- Country: India
- Language: Tamil

Kuttrapathirikai (transl. Charge Sheet) is a 2007 Indian Tamil-language film directed by R. K. Selvamani. The film stars Ramki, Rahman, Ramya Krishnan and Roja. It was produced by Ravi Yadav's Yadavalaya Films, had music scored by Ilaiyaraaja and has the assassination of Rajiv Gandhi and the Sri Lankan Civil War as its backdrop. The film began production in 1991 and was completed by 1992, but remained stuck for fifteen years as the Censor Board refused to allow such a film with a drastic political message to be released; the film was finally released in March 2007 with several cuts.

== Plot ==
A group of people in a van and ambassador car make their way into an apartment building, start shooting at the guard and proceed to kill people inside the apartment including Padmanabha, the EPRLF leader. They then kill the policemen in the check post and proceed.

They are caught by Ramakrishnan (Ramki) and Arun (Rahman). Ramakrishnan also saves Divya (Ramya Krishnan) when she is caught in the chase. When Ramakrishnan questions the leader Sivarasan (Mansoor Ali Khan), he remains silent. Another LTTE member (Rajesh) who was not caught phones Subha Sundaram to release his fellows. Ramakrishnan releases them and they proceed to Sri Lanka.

Divya parks her car in a no parking area and refuses to move the car. When asked by a traffic constable, she shows Ramakrishnan's business card. Arun orders to seize the car and also tears up the business card that Divya shows him.

Divya complains to Ramakrishnan and asks him to get the car and an apology from Arun. Ramakrishnan convinces Arun to give her car back. Then Ramakrishnan and Divya get married.

One day in a meeting, the DGP (M. N. Nambiar) informs that the state govt may be dismissed, so they have to tighten security in Chennai since ruling party supporters may indulge in violence.

Sivarasan, Dhanu and group of 12 people arrive in a boat from Jaffna to Point Calimere, they are received by the smuggler Shanmugam, who accommodates them. Sivarasan exchanges suitcase of gold biscuits for money. Sivarasan then goes to Subha Sundaram's house to find the photographer. Then Subha introduces Hari babu to Sivarasan. Sivarasan insists Haribabu to take photos of all political party leaders' homes, offices etc. and when the latter ask for a reason, Sivarasan says it is for a book to be published worldwide. The DGP informs that Rajiv Gandhi (Anupam Kher) will arrive in Sriperumbudur for an election rally and they must guard him since he is under threat of terrorists. Sivarasan and other LTTE members assemble and plan to kill Rajiv Gandhi during the election rally. They then conduct a mock drill of the assassination and prepare a belt bomb.

Rajiv Gandhi arrives and gives his answers on Ramjanmabhoomi and the Sri Lankan issue to reporters at a press meet. He then garlands Indira Gandhi's statue and arrives at the venue. Dhanu sneaks in as a person to garland Rajiv Gandhi. Arun doesn't allow her since she is not on the list. When Rajiv Gandhi arrives, he lets Dhanu garland him when a female constable stops her, and she activates the bomb. Confusion follows after the blast and wires short-circuit due to the impact.

A colleague of Haribabu phones Subha Sundaram that Hari is dead due to the blast. Subha asks him to get Hari's camera saying it is very important.

The riots break out in Chennai city due to Rajiv Gandhi's death and a small hotel owner asks Sivarasan and others to leave due to the tension. They all leave in a Maruthi van. The rioters plan to cut up a DMK flag. But a DMK worker (Chandrasekhar) fights them. Ramakrishnan intervenes and the worker recites poetry saying that they are not weak, but they follow their party orders since they believe their party as a family. A voiceover of Muthuvel Karunanidhi is heard saying that at this unfortunate time, people may provoke and try to demoralise the party, but they must not lose their hope.

Arun tries to talk with DGP regarding suspension of officers. A Congress leader asks the DGP to release his party men. The DGP says rowdies and goondas are using this situation so they cannot differentiate between rowdy and party members. Arun asks why they have been suspended the Congress leader says they should be dismissed. Arun loses his cool when the Congress leader says police have chickened out and run, Arun says that since there where no party people and only police, common people died. Arun asks whether they knew of the blast before, he storms out and Ramakrishnan follows him. The DGP asks the leader to go away since politicians and police still have respect.

Karthickeyan (Vijayakumar) from New Delhi arrives to investigate the case. Sivarasan says they are at a critical stage of their mission and says that the Tamil Nadu coast has come into control of the Indian Navy so they cannot escape via sea. Another LTTE commander (Rajesh) says that Karthickeyan is a competent officer and says that they must not use old contacts and must remain underground till further instructions.

Karthickeyan arrives in Chennai. He tells the officials that they must not believe in a single path to cracking the case. He also says that the Press can divert them by posting rumours. He visits the assassination site and then later in headquarters and asks Ramakrishnan to develop the film from Haribabu's camera. In Thiruthuraipoondi, Shankar gets caught and based on his diary, the officers arrest Nalini's mother, brother and finally Nalini and Murugan. Based on their confessions, they arrest Subha Sundaram and Shanmugham and also find a large cache of weapons in the safe house and beaches.

Meanwhile, the hit squad moves to Mysore and lies low as per instructions. Sivarasan says that only one mission is completed. The investigating team gets information of Sivarasan and others hiding in Konakunte near Mysore. They proceed and after a standoff, Sivarasan and Subha commit suicide and also destroy all evidence.

In an ADMK victory celebration of Jayalalithaa, the tigers plan to kill her, but Ramakrishnan recognises and shoots him. While trying to find out about others, a militant who was disguised as officer kills the militant. Then Ramakrishnan chases him and kills him. The militants then threaten Ramakrishnan that they will kill his wife. Arun goes to Ramakrishnan's home and manages to kill the militant even though he is heavily injured. Another LTTE commander (Rajesh) plans to kill the chief minister through a bomb attached to his police jeep and crash into the CM's car. Ramakrishnan crashes his car and jumps into the sea. In the end, Arun and Geetha are United and Ramakrishnan & Divya have babies and all four are seen on the beach. A militant holding a rifle is shown with the message "No More Violence" in the ending scene.

== Cast ==
- Ramki as ACP Ramakrishnan IPS
- Rahman as Arun IPS
- Ramya Krishnan as Divya
- Roja as Geeta
- Mohini as Rekha
- Vijayakumar as Karthikeyan
- Livingston as Haribabu
- Anupam Kher as Rajiv Gandhi
- M. N. Nambiar as DGP
- Mansoor Ali Khan as Sivarasan
- Rajesh as an LTTE commander

== Production ==
Production work for the film began in 1991 and it was announced that the assassination of Rajiv Gandhi and the Sri Lankan Civil War would be its backdrop. The film was launched in July 1991 and completed by mid-1992, with plans of a release in October 1992.

In December 2006, in a landmark judgement, the Madras High Court dismissed a petition filed on behalf of the Central Board of Censors against an earlier verdict by the court, allowing the screening of the film with an 'A' (adults only) certificate after certain cuts. The court subsequently directed the board to award an 'A' certificate to the film within four weeks of their judgement. The petition had alleged that the film supported the Liberation Tigers of Tamil Eelam (LTTE). Sections of the Tamil Nadu Congress had also taken exception to some scenes in the film. Chief Justice of Madras High Court A. P. Shah and Justice K. Chandru viewed the film and found nothing objectionable in it. R. K. Selvamani revealed that the court had actually said there is no need to delete the portions, which the earlier verdict wanted to be cut. The scenes, which the censors wanted to cut, included the Tigers' training and police officers fleeing the venue, where Rajiv Gandhi was assassinated.

== Soundtrack ==
The soundtrack was composed by Ilaiyaraaja.

Track listing
No.	Title	Singer(s)	Length
1.	"Madhavara"	Swarnalatha	4:40
2.	"Thaam Dhana"	Malaysia Vasudevan	6:15
Total length:			10:55

== Reception ==
Cinefundas wrote, "The film’s only positive point is Anupam Kher and Vijay Kumar underplaying their parts well by giving a good account of them while Ramki and Rahman has come out with a mediocre performance like a deflated ballon". Malini Mannath wrote for Chennai Online, "Cleverly scripted and presented, [Selvamani's previous] films had engaged the viewers and provided for some racy entertainment. But 'Kutrappathrikai' fails on all counts". Sify wrote "Kuttrapathirikai is just another run of the mill masala film that used to be churned out of the Kollywood film factory in the 90's.All the allegations against the film are totally unfound, as it turns out to be yet another typical action formula movie. In fact the basic thread of the film is taken from the classic Chuck Norris police action movies of the late 80's- Delta Force 1 and 2".
