= Lakshmikanthan Kolai Vazhakku =

2026 Indian Tamil-language political crime drama film

- Theatrical release poster
- Directed by: Dayal Padmanabhan
- Screenplay by: Kavitha Bharathy
- Story by: Dayal Padmanabhan
- Produced by: K. V. Shabarreesh
- Starring: Vetri; Rangaraj Pandey
- Cinematography: M. V. Panneerselvam
- Edited by: Bhoopathy Vedhagiri
- Music by: Darbuka Siva
- Production companies: 2M Cinemas; D Pictures
- Distributed by: Trident Arts
- Release date: 10 July 2026
- Running time: 107 minutes
- Country: India
- Language: Tamil

Lakshmikanthan Kolai Vazhakku (transl. Lakshmikanthan murder case) is a 2026 Indian Tamil-language political crime drama film co-written and directed by Dayal Padmanabhan. The film stars Vetri and Rangaraj Pandey in the lead roles. Shot between November 2025 and April 2026, it was released theatrically on 10 July 2026.

== Plot ==
In 1972, a man named Arivumathi is sentenced to death for murdering a man named Lakshmikanthan.

== Cast ==
- Vetri as Arivumathi
- Rangaraj Pandey as Sivanandham
- Brigida Saga as Mallika
- Lollu Sabha Maaran as Moorthy
- Saravanan as Sargunam
- Lizzie Antony as Soodamani
- Logan Kannan
- Narmadha
- Madhankumar Dakshinamoorthy as Velmurugan
- Subramaniam Siva as Dharman
- Kanya Bharathi as Annam
- Kavitha Bharathy

== Production ==
The film was directed by Dayal Padmanabhan, who also co-wrote the screenplay with Kavitha Bharathi. It was produced by K. V. Shabarreesh under the banners 2M Cinemas and D Pictures, with Dayal Padmanabhan serving as co-producer. Cinematography was handled by M. V. Panneerselvam. Editing was handled by Bhoopathy Vedhagiri, while the film's score and soundtrack were composed by Darbuka Siva. The film's title is a reference to the Lakshmikanthan murder case. Filming began in November 2025, and was complete by April 2026, with the majority of filming having taken place in Chennai.

== Release and reception ==
Lakshmikanthan Kolai Vazhakku was released theatrically on 10 July 2026, having been delayed from 25 June. Trident Arts distributed the film in Tamil Nadu.

== Reception ==
Abhinav Subramanian of The Times of India said that "Vetri is adequate and does what he can to carry the film. The melodrama surrounding his family, with members weeping on cue, lays it on thick where restraint would have served better. Rangaraj Pandey is the more watchable presence, lending the jailer a composed authority the film needs more of." Ashwin S of the Cinema Express said, "Lakshmikanthan Kolai Vazhakku could have been a proper 'karuthu' padam, but is instead let down by the very calculated nature of the writing." Dina Thanthi wrote that the realistic scenes are the strength of the film. Maalai Malar stated that overall, it is not just a film about a murder case and has emerged as a socially conscious film.
