= Kadhal Kadhai =

2009 film directed by Velu Prabhakaran

- Theatrical release poster
- Directed by: Velu Prabhakaran
- Written by: Velu Prabhakaran
- Produced by: J. Satish Kumar
- Starring: Velu Prabhakaran; Shirley Das; Preity Rangayani; Babilona; Stefi
- Cinematography: Veda Selvam
- Edited by: P. Keerthi Mohan
- Music by: Ilaiyaraaja
- Production company: JSK Film Corporation
- Distributed by: Kalasangham Films
- Release date: 17 July 2009
- Running time: 110 minutes
- Country: India
- Language: Tamil

Kadhal Kadhai (transl. Love story), also known as Velu Prabhakaranin Kadhal Kadhai (transl. Velu Prabhakaran's love story), is a 2009 Indian Tamil language erotic romantic drama film written and directed by Velu Prabhakaran. The film stars himself, Shirley Das, Preity Rangayani, Babilona, and Stefi, with Jai Rathan, Adhiroopan, Sampath Ram, Srilekha, Saakshi Siva, and Suruli Manohar playing supporting roles. The film, produced by J. Satish Kumar, had music by Ilaiyaraaja. After years of struggle with the censor board, the film was released on 17 July 2009 amid a controversy over its adult content.

== Plot ==
Film director Velu Prabhakaran has directed a controversial film containing nudity, and the censor board banned the film's release; thus, Prabhakaran is caught in legal battles to release the film. One day, after a court hearing, goons attack Prabhakaran, and he is rushed to the hospital in a serious condition. The police investigates the murder attempt, and a female journalist (Stefi) who has recently interviewed Prabhakaran is interrogated by the police. A few days ago, Prabhakaran told her the story of his film, which was about three women – Raani (Shirley Das), Thangam (Preity Rangayani), and Saroja (Babilona) – who hailed from the village Vishnupuram. The three women have one common issue: lust.

Vishnupuram is affected by communal riots that frequently break out between upper-caste and lower-caste people. During a riot, the lower-caste girl Raani is saved by the upper-caste boy Sakthi (Jai Rathan), and they fall in love. Sakthi is the son of the heartless caste leader Reddiar, while Raani is the niece of the brute Karuppaiah (Sampath Ram). Reddiar and Karuppaiah are archenemies. A bachelor schoolteacher (Adhiroopan) falls under the spell of his maid Thangam, a poor single mother. Thangam was dumped by her boyfriend after he made her pregnant; therefore, she was rejected by her brother Pazhani and sister-in-law Saroja. One day, the teacher gives Thangam a glass of milk mixed with sleeping pills and rapes her in her sleep. The teacher then promises to marry Thangam but later tells her that his family arranged his wedding with a woman of his caste. Feeling betrayed by a man for the second time, Thangam spits on the teacher's face, and he leaves the village. Saroja, who would do anything for money, has an affair with Reddiar. One day, Pazhani catches Saroja sleeping with Reddiar, and Reddiar brutally kills him.

After telling the story, Prabhakaran shared with the journalist his troubled love life and the reason why he directed this film. Back to the present, the police arrest the culprit: Prabhakaran's ex-wife. She wanted to hide her previous marriage from her new husband, so she hired goons to kill him.

A few months later, Prabhakaran, now healed, meets the journalist and tells her the climax of his film. Sakthi and Raani wanted to elope, but Reddiar caught them and beheaded Raani. In turn, Sakthi murdered him. The journalist then proposes her love to Prabhakaran, who tells her that he does not believe in love but in lust.

== Cast ==
- Velu Prabhakaran as himself
- Shirley Das as Raani
- Preity Rangayani as Thangam
- Babilona as Saroja
- Stefi as Journalist
- Jai Rathan as Sakthi
- Sampath Ram as Karuppaiah
- Adhiroopan as Teacher
- Srilekha as Raani's mother
- Saakshi Siva as Police Inspector
- Suruli Manohar
- Sundar
- Poochi Senthil
- Aavadi Manoharan
- Anbu Thennarasu

== Production ==
Velu Prabhakaran began work on the production of a film titled Kadhal Arangam in October 2003, writing the story, screenplay and dialogue for the project. The censor board was not initially willing to give it a certificate due to objectionable scenes and an ongoing battle with the censor board emerged in December 2004. In 2009, the team finally agreed to tone down the scenes and mute certain dialogues and to compromise with the censors, they changed the title from Kadhal Arangam to Kadhal Kadhai. The director had reportedly inserted a few elements from this story of his life into the film and in the title credits of the film, Velu Prabhakaran included an extended scene which narrates his opinions and difficulties of the way the film released; while he also played the role of a film director in the venture, noting that parts were autobiographical.

== Soundtrack ==
The music was composed by Ilaiyaraaja, with lyrics written by Muthulingam and Mu. Metha.

Track listing
No.	Title	Singer(s)	Length
1.	"Malare Malare"	Ilaiyaraaja	4:34
2.	"Kadukule Nadakurathe"	Karthik, Chorus	4:45
Total length:			9:19

== Release ==
The film was released on 17 July 2009, and took a good opening, which the media attributed to steamy scenes.
