= Oru Iyakkunarin Kadhal Diary =

2017 film by Velu Prabhakaran

- Theatrical release poster
- Directed by: Velu Prabhakaran
- Written by: Velu Prabhakaran
- Starring: Velu Prabhakaran; Pon Swathi
- Cinematography: Manivannan
- Edited by: J.F Castro
- Music by: Ilaiyaraaja
- Production company: Sures Invincible Innovations
- Release date: 2 June 2017
- Running time: 123 minutes
- Country: India
- Language: Tamil

Oru Iyakkunarin Kadhal Diary (transl. A Film director's love diary) is a 2017 Tamil-language Indian film directed by Velu Prabhakaran, starring himself and Pon Swathi with many newcomers. It was released on 2 June 2017.

== Summary ==
Oru Iyakkunarin Kadhal Diary is a story of a film director and his experience in film industry.

== Cast ==
- Velu Prabhakaran
- Pon Swathi
- Ragunath Manet
- Jega
- Remya

== Production ==
After the failure of his last few films, Velu Prabhakaran kept away from the film industry for a number of years and launched his film Oru Iyakkunarin Kadhal Diary with himself, Pon Swathi and many newcomers. The film had a launch in August 2015, and had a teaser released during January 2016. Prabakaran said the film is about his experience as a film director in show business. He also said that, his aim is to make people understand the power of divine love and if the film is banned due to its adult content, then it's an insult to the government and not to him. The film was shot at Kodaikanal, Khajuraho and Jaipur. The trailer of the film was released during May 2017.

== Reception ==
A critic from iFlicks wrote that "In short, Oru Iyakkunarin Kadhal Diary has still a lot more that can be written". Nadika Nadja of Silverscreen India wrote, "It looks, sounds, and feels like a cheaply made film. Little more than a home video, with some hammed-up, scenery-chewing performances, poor lip sync [...] questionable make-up, and really bad sex". Critic Malini Mannath wrote, "Crudely taken, the film (123 minutes) could have done with better crafting and a more aesthetic treatment".
