= Adimai Changili =

- Title card
- Directed by: R. K. Selvamani
- Written by: E. Ramdoss (Dialogue)
- Screenplay by: R. K. Selvamani
- Story by: R. K. Selvamani
- Produced by: M. M. Thahaa; R. K. Selvamani
- Starring: Arjun; Roja; Rambha; Sunitha
- Cinematography: M. V. Panneerselvam
- Edited by: Ashok Mehta
- Music by: Deva
- Production company: Sai Roja Companies
- Release date: 9 May 1997
- Country: India
- Language: Tamil

Adimai Changili (transl. Chain of slavery) is a 1997 Indian Tamil language action film directed by R. K. Selvamani. The film stars Arjun and Roja, while Rambha, Sunitha, Anandaraj and M. N. Nambiar play supporting roles. It was released on 9 May 1997.

== Cast ==
- Arjun as Karthikeyan
- Roja as Senthamarai
- Rambha as Radha
- Sunitha
- Anandaraj
- Charle
- M. N. Nambiar
- Radha Ravi
- Jai Ganesh
- Chinni Jayanth
- Vadivelu
- Visu
- Ponnambalam

== Production ==
During the making of the film, it was reported that Rambha fell out with the director due to his excessive promotion of the film's other heroine Roja over her.

== Soundtrack ==
Soundtrack was composed by Deva.

Song	Singers	Lyrics	Length
Jeeboomba Jeeboomba	Mano	Vaasan	05:02
Mazhai Nadathum	Krishnaraj, Anuradha Sriram	Vaasan	05:11
Sultan Pettai	Adithyan, Swarnalatha	Piraisoodan	04:26
Ellora Ellora	Gopal Rao, Bharathi	Arunmozhi	04:41
Kaanangatha Meenu	Deva, Anuradha Sriram	Piraisoodan	03:50
Oh Laali	Gopal Rao, Swarnalatha	Kamakodiyan	04:22

== Reception ==
K. N. Vijiyan of New Straits Times called the film "a polished effort despite the poor finish".
