= Kadavul =

- Poster
- Directed by: Velu Prabhakaran
- Written by: Velu Prabhakaran
- Produced by: H. Anraaj
- Starring: Velu Prabhakaran; Arun Pandian; Manivannan; Mansoor Ali Khan; Roja
- Cinematography: Velu Prabhakaran
- Edited by: Nandamuri Haribabu
- Music by: Ilaiyaraaja
- Production company: Deccan Pictures PVT. LTD.
- Release date: 5 December 1997
- Running time: 130 minutes
- Country: India
- Language: Tamil

Kadavul (transl. God) is a 1997 Indian Tamil language film directed by Velu Prabhakaran. The film stars Velu Prabhakaran, Manivannan, Arun Pandiyan, Mansoor Ali Khan and Roja. It was released on 5 December 1997. Despite having controversial themes, the film was well received.

== Plot ==
Parvathi (Roja), a young woman, is a goddess believer while her father (V. Gopalakrishnan) is the priest of a temple. After a quarrel between two castes during a Hindu festival, the temple was closed off. Five years later, the temple reopens.

Muthu (Rahul) and Thenmozhi (Nandhini) are in love but they are not of the same caste. Velusamy (Karikalan), Thenmozhi's uncle, finds out their love and forces her to marry him.

K. Shanmugam (Mansoor Ali Khan), a corrupt MLA, kills a girl and blames Thamizharasan (Arun Pandian). Thamizharasan fights against injustice and is a revolutionary. Angry, Thamizharasan tries to kill him but fails and eventually steals his money. In the process, Thamizharasan is injured and the prostitute Shenbagam (Rupasri) takes care of him.

Rajapandi (Velu Prabhakaran), an atheist, propagates the non-existence of God. One day, he saves Parvathi from her uncle K. Shanmugam and accidentally marries her. Soon, Rajapandi gets beaten by the devotees. In anger, Rajapandi challenges God to become a human and understand the humans, and God (Manivannan) appears as a human.

== Cast ==
- Velu Prabhakaran as Rajapandi
- Manivannan as God
- Arun Pandian as Thamizharasan
- Mansoor Ali Khan as K. Shanmugam M.L.A
- Roja as Parvathi
- Rahul as Muthu
- Nandhini as Thenmozhi
- V. Gopalakrishnan as Parvathi's father
- Karikalan as Velusamy
- Naga Kannan
- Roopa Sri as Shenbagam
- J. Lalitha as Thenmozhi's mother
- Shakeela
- Vincent Roy
- Suryakanth
- Meesai Murugesan as Naidu
- V. Pandu

== Production ==
Sathyaraj had been first choice to play the lead role, but his refusal prompted Velu Prabhakaran to take on the lead role himself. Delhi-based model and former air hostess Nandhini was signed on to play a role after the director had seen her modelling pictures.

== Soundtrack ==
The music was composed by Ilaiyaraaja, with lyrics written by Pulamaipithan.

Song	Singer(s)	Duration
"Aadi Sivan Tholil Irukkum"	Bhavatharini	5:40
"Ariviruntha Konjam"	Malaysia Vasudevan	4:51
"Enakku Oru Raasa"	Amudha	5:08
"Kaathalai"	P. Unni Krishnan, Sujatha	5:07
"Kovilukku Irukkum"	K. S. Chithra	4:52
"Poovarasan Poove"	Arunmozhi, Sujatha	5:20

== Reception ==
Yugandhan of Kalki wrote though Kadavul speaks about atheism, it is not a complete effort. He also added approaching the theme superficially, by adding a bit of crudeness, can be more dangerous than blue films. Yugandhan praised Ilaiyaraaja's background score as the only highlight of the film. Prabhakaran won the Tamil Nadu State Film Award for Best Screenplay Writer.

== Potential sequel ==
In January 2018, Prabhakaran announced that he would be making a sequel, titled Kadavul 2. The film has stars Tamil Selvan and Swathy with Imman Annachi and veteran Seetha in supporting roles.
