= Rangaraj Pandey =

Indian journalist and actor

Rangaraj P
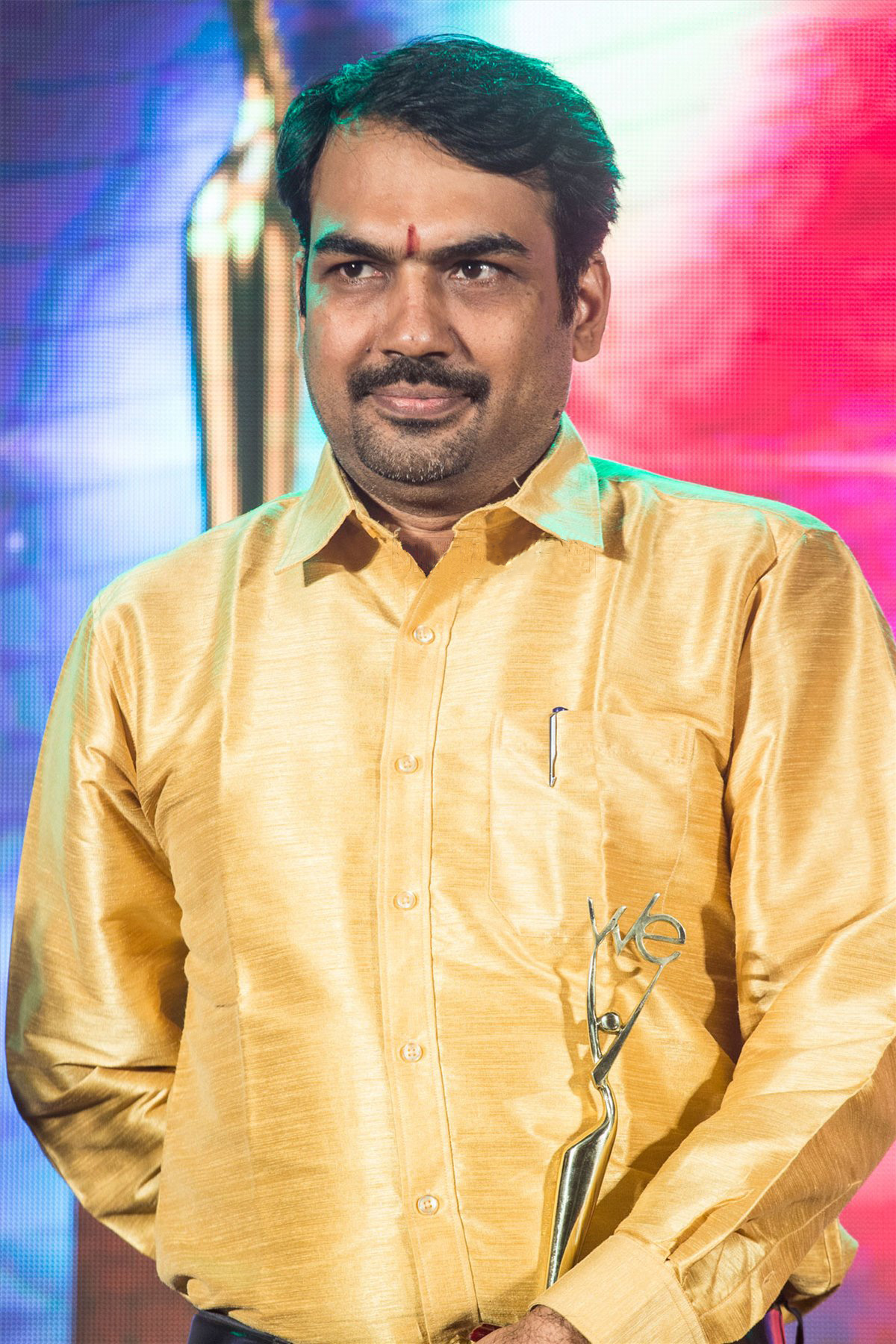
- Pandey at the 12th We Awards 2016
- Born: Rangaraj Pandey Ragunathacharya; 16 November 1975 (age 50); Srivilliputhur, India
- Education: Madurai Kamaraj University
- Occupations: Former Editor-in-Chief of Thanthi TV; Youtuber Chanakyaa (YouTube Channel); Journalist; .
- Years active: 1998 – present
- Notable credit(s): Doubtu Dhanabalu, Ayutha Ezhuthu, Kelvikenna Bathil , Nerkonda Paarvai
- Children: 2

Rangaraj Pandey Ragunathacharya is an Indian journalist and actor, who started his career at Dinamalar and Visual Media Career at Thanthi TV.

== Early life and career ==
His parents, who were from the Buxar district, Bihar, migrated to Tamil Nadu before his birth. He did his schooling at a Tamil-medium government school in Srivilliputhur.

Pandey hosted Kelvikku Enna Badhil (transl. What is the answer to the question?) and Ayutha Ezhuthu on Thanthi TV.

== Filmography ==
Year	Film	Role	Notes	Ref.
2016	Wagah	Himself	Uncredited role	
2019	Nerkonda Paarvai	Advocate Sathyamoorthy		
2020	Ka Pae Ranasingam	Tamizhkumaran		
2026	Love Insurance Kompany	Judge	Cameo appearance	
2026	Angikaaram	Judge		
2026	Lakshmikanthan Kolai Vazhakku	Sivanandham		

== Awards and accolades ==
Year	Award	Honouring body
2018	The Most Talked About Host Award	Galatta Nakshathra Awards
