= Angikaaram =

2026 Indian Tamil language film

- Theatrical release poster
- Directed by: Thenpathiyan
- Produced by: SK Prasanth; Ajith Baskar; Arun Murugan
- Starring: Kotapadi J Rajesh; Sindhoori Vishwanath
- Cinematography: A. Viswanath
- Edited by: Dineshkumar
- Music by: Ghibran Vaibodha
- Production company: Swasthik Visions
- Release date: 26 June 2026
- Running time: 140 minutes
- Country: India
- Language: Tamil

Angikaaram (transl. Acknowledgement / Recognition) is a 2026 Indian Tamil-language sports legal drama film directed by Thenpathiyan in his debut. The film stars Kotapadi J Rajesh, and Sindhoori Vishwanath in the lead roles. It was released on 26 June 2026, and did not perform well at the box office.

== Plot ==
Aathiran Banumathi is a skilled athlete from an oppressed background. He sets records in the 200 metres run, but when his efforts are overlooked by sporting bodies and he is not allowed to participate in the Commonwealth Games, Aathiran decides to fight it out in court.

== Cast ==
- Kotapadi J Rajesh as Aathiran
- Sindhoori
- Viji Venkatesh
- Rangaraj Pandey
- Mansoor Ali Khan
- Rama as Aathiran's mother
- Vasundhara Kashyap
- Mohan Raman as Judge
- Aroul D. Shankar
- Ajit Koshy

== Production ==
The film marks the directorial debut of Thenpathiyan, who previously worked as an assistant director to Pa. Ranjith for Kaala (2018). Kotapadi J Rajesh was cast after Thenpathiyan wanted a fresh face; it is his debut in a leading role. Since he plays an athlete, Rajesh bulked up for the role, training for at least eight months.

== Reception ==
Abhinav Subramanian of The Times of India said that "The subject, the way institutional politics smothers talent from the bottom rungs, deserves a film. That film is in there somewhere, under all the speeches and the heaped-on suffering. Angikaaram just never trusts you to find it on your own." Avinash Ramachandran of the Cinema Express said that "One can't move past the assembly line of scenes that feel lifeless just because it preaches the right things. Nevertheless, as the credits roll, we can't help but wake up to a stinging reality."
