= Annanagar Mudhal Theru =

- Theatrical release poster
- Directed by: Balu Anand
- Screenplay by: Balu Anand
- Story by: Sathyan Anthikad
- Produced by: M. Padmavathi
- Starring: Sathyaraj; Ambika; Radha
- Cinematography: V. Ranga
- Edited by: T. R. Shekhar
- Music by: Chandrabose
- Production company: Vivekananda Pictures
- Release date: 14 January 1988
- Running time: 159 minutes
- Country: India
- Language: Tamil

Annanagar Mudhal Theru (transl. Anna Nagar First Street) is a 1988 Indian Tamil-language comedy drama film directed by Balu Anand. The film stars Sathyaraj, Ambika, and Radha. It is a remake of the 1986 Malayalam film Gandhinagar 2nd Street. The film was released on 14 January 1988.

== Plot ==
Sivaraman, unable to find a good job, joins a colony as a security guard, identifying himself as Ramsingh. Geetha lives in the colony with her daughter. Geetha's husband works abroad. A police officer Rajagopal comes to the colony along with his daughter Latha. Latha is none other than Sivaraman's ex-lover. A flashback is shown where Sivaraman and Latha are classmates and in love with each other, but Latha breaks up after a misunderstanding.

Seeing Latha after a long time, Sivaraman gets excited but Latha does not reciprocate. Geetha finds Sivaraman's real identity and treats him with respect, while other colony members ill-treat him as he is just a security guard. The colony members also spreads rumours about Geetha having illegal affair with Sivaraman. Anand, a cunning guy lives in the colony and sets an eye on Latha but gets beaten up by Sivaraman. Now the colony members turn against Sivaraman. But Geetha comes to Sivaraman's rescue. Latha also understands that Sivaraman is still in love with her and decides to patch up with him.

Geetha's husband comes from abroad. The colony members speak ill about Geetha to Ramesh. But Ramesh does not believe those and trusts Geetha. It is revealed that Geetha has already informed Ramesh about Sivaraman, and Ramesh has also arranged him a job abroad. The movie ends on a positive note with Sivaraman and Latha uniting.

== Cast ==
- Sathyaraj as Sivaraman/Ramsingh
- Ambika as Geetha
- Radha as Latha
- Manorama as Colony Secretary Shenbagam
- Janagaraj as Madhavan
- Raghuvaran as Widowed Professor
- Jai Ganesh as Inspector Rajagopal
- Anand as Flirty son of Manorama and smuggler
- Vennira Aadai Moorthy as Script Writer
- Thyagu as Constable
- T. S. Raghavendra as Smuggler
- C. R. Saraswathi as Saraswathi
- Chinni Jayanth
- Charle
- MRK
- Kumarimuthu
- Prabhu as Ramesh (extended cameo)

== Production ==
The film was launched at Prasad Studios on 10 July 1987 along with song recording of "Hey Pachaikili". Despite the film's title, none of the scenes were shot at Anna Nagar. The filming was completed in November 1987.

== Soundtrack ==
The music was composed by Chandrabose. The songs especially "Medhuva Medhuva" (set in Abheri/Bhimpalasi Raga) became chartbusters.

Song	Singers	Lyrics	Length
"Enna Kathai Solla" (Female)	K. S. Chithra	Pulamaipithan	04:23
"Enna Kathai Solla" (Male)	S. P. Balasubrahmanyam	Pulamaipithan	04:15
"Medhuva Meduva"	S. P. Balasubrahmanyam, K. S. Chithra	Vaali	04:19
"Theem Thanakutheem"	S. P. Balasubrahmanyam	Vaali	04:18
"Yei Pacha Kili"	Malaysia Vasudevan, Vani Jairam	Pulamaipithan	04:31

== Release and reception ==
Annanagar Mudhal Theru was released on 14 January 1988. The following week, N. Krishnaswamy of The Indian Express praised the performances of Janagaraj and Sathyaraj, but noted that, slowly the film "belies its distinctive start and sluds into tiresome cliches so well-beloved to Tamil cinema." Jayamanmadhan of Kalki gave a mixed review for various aspects, including the editing and inclusion of ingredients not relevant to the story.
