= T. S. Raghavendra =

Indian actor (1945–2020)

- Born: 19 September 1945; Tamil Nadu, India
- Died: 30 January 2020 (Aged 74)
- Other name: Vijayaramani
- Occupations: Actor; Singer; Music Director
- Years active: 1984-2005
- Spouse: Sulochana
- Children: Kalpana Raghavendar, Shekinah Shawn

T. S. Raghavendra (19 September 1945 – 30 January 2020) was an Indian actor, playback singer and occasional music director who concentrated on Tamil-language films. As an actor, he was known as the father character of actress Revathi in Vaidehi Kathirunthal.

He also gave music for a few films like Uyir (old Tamil film), Padikkatha Paadam and Yaaga Saalai.

== Personal life ==
His wife Sulochana is also a singer His daughter Shekinah Shawn (born Prasanna Raghavendar) who is popular as an Opera singer and daughter Kalpana is also playback singer.

== Filmography ==
=== As actor ===
==== Films ====
Year	Movie title	Notes
1984	Vaidehi Kathirunthal	
1985	Sindhu Bhairavi	
1986	Vikram	
1987	Chinna Thambi Periya Thambi	
1988	Annanagar Mudhal Theru	
1988	Solla Thudikuthu Manasu	
1989	Dharmam Vellum	
1989	Vaai Kozhuppu	
1991	Karpoora Mullai	
1991	Ente Sooryaputhrikku	
1991	Rudra	
1996	Vaazhga Jananayagam	
1998	Harichandra	
1999	Nee Varuvai Ena	
2000	Ilaiyavan	
2003	Kadhaludan	
2005	Pon Megalai	

==== Television ====
- 1999 Pushpanjali
- 2000-2001 Anandha Bhavan - Ganga's father-in-law
- 2004-2009 Kolangal - "Church Father" Rafael
- 2007-2008 Athi Pookal - Easwari's father-in-law

=== As Music Director ===
Year	Movie title	Notes
1979	Ninaivil Oru malar	
1980	Yaaga Saalai	
1980	then sittugal	
1971	Uyir	
1986	Padikkatha Paadam	

=== As singer ===
Year	Song(s)	Film	Notes
1984	Azhagu Malarada	Vaidehi Kathirunthal	
1993	Madurai Marikozhundhu	Rajadhi Raja Raja Kulothunga Raja Marthanda Raja Gambeera Kathavaraya Krishna Kamarajan	
1996	Adi Painkili, Mazhai Penji	Vaazhga Jananayagam	
