= Ennai Paar Yogam Varum =

- Poster
- Directed by: M. Jameen Raj
- Screenplay by: M. Jameen Raj
- Story by: Mansoor Ali Khan
- Produced by: Mansoor Ali Khan
- Starring: Mansoor Ali Khan; Manju
- Cinematography: Ashokrajan
- Edited by: K. M. P. Kumar
- Music by: A. K. Vasagan (songs); Devendran (score)
- Production company: Raj Kennedy Films
- Release date: 6 July 2007
- Running time: 140 minutes
- Country: India
- Language: Tamil

Ennai Paar Yogam Varum (transl. See me and you will get luck) is a 2007 Indian Tamil language action comedy film directed by M. Jameen Raj. The film stars Mansoor Ali Khan and newcomer Manju, with Kandeepan, Kutty, Priyanka Shailu, R. Sundarrajan, Anuradha, Abhinayashree, Ponnambalam and Manikka Vinayagam playing supporting roles. The film, produced by Mansoor Ali Khan, was released on 6 July 2007 after many delays.

== Plot ==
The lovers Meena and Jeeva elope and they decide to get married at the registrar's office. Meena's father Anandaraman orders the rowdy Jaga to bring him his daughter back and to put Jeeva in jail. At the registrar's office, Jaga and his sidekicks break the arm of the deputy tehsildar Krishnamoorthy and the forges his signature on a marriage document. Jaga tracks down the lovers in a police station and he blames Jeeva for kidnapping Meena and for signature forgery. Jeeva is then put in police lockup and Jaga forcefully brings Meena to her father.

Kandeepan falls in love with Jagadeeshwari and he makes his mother Seethamangalam Muthamma, a greedy and corrupt politician, accepts for the marriage. Krishnamoorthy decides to get VRS and puts all his savings to arrange his daughter's wedding. Thereafter, Muthamma makes a deal with a political leader: fixing the marriage between Kandeepan and the political leader's granddaughter. Muthamma then delegates Jaga the mission of stopping the wedding between her son and Jagadeeshwari. On the day of the marriage, Jaga wreaked havoc in the wedding hall and stops the marriage. Krishnamoorthy who felt humiliated and distraught of losing all his savings dies of a heart attack on the spot. Jagadeeshwari vows to take revenge on Jaga.

Later, Jagadeeshwari files a false rape complaint against Jaga and he is arrested by the police but he then comes out of jail thanks to his lawyer. Meanwhile, Jeeva, who is now in a wheelchair after a suicide attempt, and Meena meet Jagadeeshwari, and Jagadeeshwari promises them to arrange their marriage. Jaga feels guilty for Jeeva's accident and he himself arranges their marriage while Anandaraman genuinely accepts Jeeva as his son-in-law. Jaga later learns about Muthamma's true face and saves Jagadeeshwari from her. The film ends with Jaga and Jagadeeshwari falling in love with each other.

== Cast ==
- Mansoor Ali Khan as Jaga
- Manju as Jagadeeshwari
- Kandeepan as Kandeepan
- Kutty as Jeeva
- Priyanka Shailu as Meena
- R. Sundarrajan as Anandaraman
- Anuradha as Seethamangalam Muthamma
- Abhinayashree as "Mobile" Lakshmi
- Ponnambalam as Police inspector
- Manikka Vinayagam as Krishnamoorthy
- Vennira Aadai Moorthy as Bala Balasubramaniam
- Kaka Radhakrishnan as Politician
- Anu Mohan as Anandaraman's friend
- Babitha as Jagadeeshwari's friend
- Kumarimuthu as House owner
- Pandu as Groom's father
- Nellai Siva as Head constable
- Muthukaalai as Man on cellphone
- Chitti Babu as Singer
- Thadi Balaji
- Suruli Manohar as Suruli
- Lollu Sabha Balaji as Groom
- V. M. Subburaj as Lakshmi's husband
- Idichapuli Selvaraj
- Thideer Kannaiah
- Kullamani
- Bonda Mani as Jaga's sidekick
- Benjamin as Jaga's sidekick
- Kottachi as Jaga's sidekick
- King Kong as Jaga's sidekick
- Jinda as Jaga's sidekick
- Vijay Ganesh as Party member
- Kovai Senthil as Ganesan
- Mahadevan
- Marthandam
- Rajajirajan as MLA's relative
- Vengal Rao as Henchman
- L. V. Adhavan as L. V. Kannan (guest appearance)
- Dr. Kaliyaperumal in a guest appearance
- Lawyer Rajaram in a guest appearance
- Thol. Thirumavalavan in a special appearance in a song

== Soundtrack ==
The soundtrack was composed by A. K. Vasagan. The soundtrack, released in 2007, features 6 tracks with lyrics written by Thiruvalluvar, Avvaiyar, Mansoor Ali Khan and A. K. Vasagan.

Track listing
No.	Title	Singer(s)	Length
1.	"Koyambedu Koyyapazham"	Mansoor Ali Khan, A. K. Vasagan, Laila Ali Khan	5:22
2.	"Eruvakka Sakaro"	Prasanna, Kavita Krishnamurthy	4:03
3.	"Police Police"	Abhilash, Mythili, Mansoor Ali Khan	4:21
4.	"Ennai Paar Yogam Varum"	Bairavi	3:15
5.	"Velai Vettikkellam"	K. S. Mahadevan, Sinthuri	3:48
6.	"Naan Vaikaikari"	Ranina Reddy, S. M. Moosa	4:14
Total length:			25:03

== Reception ==
Malini Mannath of Chennai Online wrote, "It's a film that one goes to without any expectation. So there's not much disappointment either".
