= Mansoor Ali Khan (actor) =

Indian actor and film producer

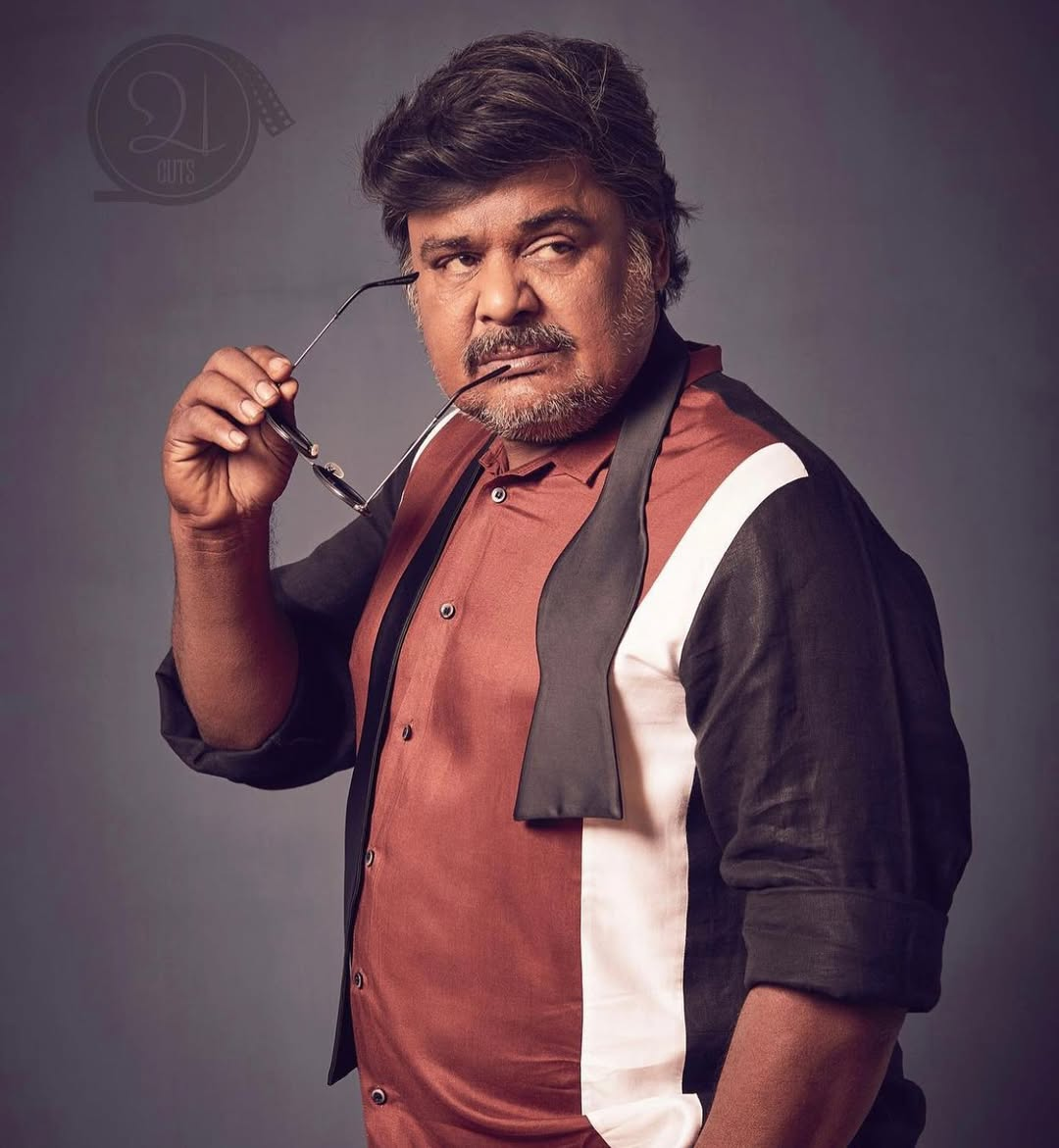
- Born: Dindigul, Tamil Nadu, India
- Occupations: Actor, film producer, composer, politician
- Years active: 1990-present
- Children: 4

Mansoor Ali Khan is an Indian actor, composer, screenwriter, film producer and politician. He has predominantly appeared in Tamil films, mostly in antagonistic and supporting roles.

He got a breakthrough role as an antagonist in Captain Prabhakaran (1991). After the success of this film, he got a lot of acting opportunities. He has acted in over 250 films in addition to producing and directing numerous films. He has also acted in some Malayalam, Kannada and Telugu films.

== Early and personal life ==
Mansoor Ali Khan was born in Dindigul, Tamil Nadu. His parents are Meesaikaara Abdul Salam Rowther and Sagorammal. Khan has three sons and a daughter.

== Film career ==
Khan has often played antagonist roles and a few lead roles. He got a breakthrough role as an antagonist in Tamil cinema industry with the R.K. Selvamani directorial Captain Prabhakaran (1991) starring Vijayakanth which became a blockbuster, fetching him a lot of acting opportunities. He did an acting course at Anupam Kher's acting school in Mumbai.

In 1993, he took a hero avatar through the film Rajadhi Raja Raja Kulothunga Raja Marthanda Raja Gambeera Kathavaraya Krishna Kamarajan. This movie was directed by Balu Anand and Mansoor Ali Khan composed the music too. He also starred in and produced the films Ravanan (1994) and Vaazhga Jananayagam (1996).

He has worked in a large number of films directed by R. K. Selvamani, such as Captain Prabhakaran (1991), Chembaruthi (1992), Athiradi Padai (1994), Kanmani (1994), Raja Muthirai (1995), Makkal Aatchi (1995), Arasiyal (1997), Kuttrapathirikai (2007) and Pulan Visaranai 2 (2015). He also collaborated with the director K. S. Ravikumar in films such as Pistha (1997), Natpukkaga (1998), Padayappa (1999), Suyamvaram (1999), Minsara Kanna (1999), Paarai (2003) and Varalaru (2006). He has been cast as a villain in most of his roles, though he has also done some character roles.

Later, he acted as lead roles in the comedy films such as Ennai Paar Yogam Varum (2007), Lollu Dha Dha Parak Parak (2013), Athiradi (2015) and Sarakku (2023). He played comedy roles with Kalyaan's directorial in Gulaebaghavali (2018), Jackpot (2019) and 80s Buildup (2023).

== Political career ==
In his early career, Mansoor Ali Khan tried his hand at politics by supporting the Pattali Makkal Katchi (PMK). At the 1999 Indian general election in Tamil Nadu, he contested from Periyakulam as a candidate of the Puthiya Tamilagam (PT), he secured about one lakh votes and finished at the third position. At the 2009 Indian general election in Tamil Nadu, he stood as an independent candidate and the opposition pressed criminal charges against him for moving around in a vehicle with a banner breaching the electoral code of conduct. At the 2019 Indian general election in Tamil Nadu, he contested from Dindigul as a candidate of the Naam Tamilar Katchi (NTK).

== Electoral career ==
=== Lok Sabha Elections Contested ===
Election	Constituency	Party	Result	Vote %	Opposition Candidate	Opposition Party	Opposition vote %
1999 Indian general election	Periyakulam	PT	Lost	13.1	T. T. V. Dhinakaran	AIADMK	45.6
2009 Indian general election	Tiruchirappalli	Independent	Lost	0.24	P. Kumar	AIADMK	41.65
2019 Indian general election	Dindigul	NTK	Lost	4.76	P. Velusamy	DMK	64.60
2024 Indian general election	Vellore	Independent	TBD	TBD	TBD	TBD	TBD

=== Tamil Nadu Legislative Assembly Elections Contested ===
Election	Constituency	Party	Result	Vote %	Opposition Candidate	Opposition Party	Opposition vote %
2021 Tamil Nadu Legislative Assembly election	Thondamuthur	Independent	Lost	0.19	S. P. Velumani	AIADMK	53.89

== Controversies ==
=== Roadblock ===
Khan was arrested in July 1998 for causing a roadblock and obstructing traffic while protesting against the pirate showings of his film Vettu Onnu Thundu Rendu (1998) on cable television. His activity led to film distributor Chinthamani Murugesan releasing a press statement condemning the television's actions and prompted a shut down of cinema halls across Pondicherry for one day.

=== False rape accusation ===
Khan was convicted on the charge of rape and awarded seven years of imprisonment on 27 March 2001 by a Sessions court. Later, in 2012, the Madras High court found the woman had made false accusations against him and ordered her to pay Rs 50 lakh as damages to the actor for malicious prosecution and defamation.

=== Land grabbing ===
Khan was arrested in January 2012 on land grabbing charges after it was alleged that he had illegally constructed a 16-storeyed property in Arumbakkam.

Khan was arrested on 17 June 2018, along with environmentalist Piyush Manush, while protesting the proposed 270-kilometre superhighway connecting Salem and Chennai.

Khan was arrested in April 2021 for spreading rumours about COVID-19 vaccination and ordered to pay 2 lakhs to the health secretary.

In 2023, Khan said in an interview that he expected to do a rape scene with actress Trisha in Leo movie but didn't get a chance to share the screen with her. The statement was criticized by social media commentators. Trisha replied to his statement, "I strongly condemn this and find it sexist, disrespectful, misogynistic, repulsive and in bad taste. He can keep wishing but I am grateful never to have shared screen space with someone as pathetic as him and I will make sure it never happens for the rest of my film career as well. People like him bring a bad name to mankind.” He then apologized to Trisha and she responded by saying "To err is human, to forgive is divine".

== Filmography ==
=== Tamil films ===
Year	Title	Role	Notes
1990	Velai Kidaichuduchu	Maari	
1991	Thangamana Thangachi	Lakshmi's brother	
1991	Captain Prabhakaran	Veerabhadran	
1991	Moondrezhuthil En Moochirukkum	Moses	
1991	Rudhra	Kedi Mayandi	
1992	Chembaruthi	Kumar	
1992	Therku Theru Machan	Devaraj	
1992	Idhuthanda Sattam	Kaali	
1992	Chinna Poovai Killathey		
1992	Magudam	Thillainathan's brother	
1992	Pandithurai	Narasimma	
1992	Thai Mozhi	Mariyaraj	
1992	Pangali	Abdul Khidr	
1992	Samundi	Rajangam	
1992	Deiva Kuzhanthai		
1992	Naalaiya Theerpu	Inspector	
1993	Kadal Pura		
1993	Ezhai Jaathi	Rajarathinam's son	
1993	Rajadhi Raja Raja Kulothunga Raja Marthanda Raja Gambeera Kathavaraya Krishna Kamarajan	Kulothungan	Also producer, music director
1993	Thalattu	Jeeva	
1993	Moondravadhu Kann	Subbarayan	
1993	Sabash Babu		
1994	Ravanan	Ravanan	Also producer
1994	Athiradi Padai	Selva	
1994	Uzhiyan	Govindaraj	
1994	Kanmani		
1995	Gangai Karai Paattu	Sitapati	
1995	Raja Muthirai	Fake Priest	
1995	Deva	Periyavar	
1995	Sandhaikku Vantha Kili		
1995	Asuran	Veerabhadran	
1995	Gandhi Pirantha Mann		
1995	Sindhu Bath	Mayilsamy	
1995	Makkal Aatchi	Valaiyapathi	
1995	Seethanam	Marimuthu	
1996	Thayagam	Snobir (Snow Bear)	
1996	Musthaffaa	Kaalaiya	
1996	Vaazhga Jananayagam	Bhagat Singh	Also producer, music director
1996	Vasantha Vaasal	Ganesh	
1996	Maanbumigu Maanavan	Politician	
1996	Rajali	Rani's uncle	
1996	Manikkam	Karuvayan	
1996	Aavathum Pennale Azhivathum Pennale	Prabhakaran	
1997	Pistha	Adv. Adhimoolam	
1997	Kadavul	K. Shanmugam	
1997	Arasiyal	Venkatraman (R. K. V)	
1997	Pagaivan	Dharman	
1998	Maru Malarchi	Mannaru	
1998	Vettu Onnu Thundu Rendu	Singaram	
1998	Jolly	Chakravarthy's father	
1998	Natpukkaga	Perusu	
1998	Dharma	Daas	
1998	Urimai Por	Balu	
1998	Cheran Chozhan Pandian	Police Inspector	
1999	Padayappa	Krishnasamy Mudaliar	
1999	Suyamvaram	Kabilan	
1999	Antahpuram	Shekhar	
1999	Minsara Kanna	Vedhachalam	
1999	Jayam	Anand	
1999	Kanmani Unakkaga	Karan	
2000	Vallarasu	Politician	
2000	Kannaal Pesavaa	Mookiah	
2000	Unnai Kann Theduthey		
2000	Puratchikkaaran		
2000	Krodham 2	Selvakumar	
2001	Thaalikaatha Kaaliamman		
2001	Seerivarum Kaalai	Kamakshi's brother	
2001	Ponnana Neram		
2002	Raajjiyam	Inspector Kabilan	
2002	Kadhal Virus	Himself	Cameo appearance
2002	En Mana Vaanil	Gajendran	
2002	Andipatti Arasampatti	Arasampatti	
2003	Parasuram	Home Minister Vishwanathan	
2003	Paarai	Vijayan's son	
2003	Thennavan	S. R. S.	
2003	Anjaneya	Contractor	
2003	Oru Thadava Sonna		
2004	Maanasthan		
2004	Arasatchi	Inspector India Ganesan	
2004	Neranja Manasu	Masanam	
2004	Arumugaswamy		
2005	Aayudham	Minister Andiappan	
2005	Chinna	Chinna's friend	
2006	Sudesi	Police inspector	
2006	Perarasu	Sivapprakasam	
2006	Varalaru	Divya's brother	
2007	Ennai Paar Yogam Varum	Jaga	Also producer, storywriter
2007	Kuttrapathirikai	Sivarasan	
2007	Rasigar Mandram	Rameshkanth, Peethamparam	
2008	Thithikkum Ilamai	Inspector Dharma	
2009	Kanthaswamy	Police Inspector	
2009	Aadatha Aattamellam	Police Inspector	
2010	Thillalangadi	Police Inspector	
2010	Virudhagiri	Police Inspector	
2011	Puli Vesham	Govindan	
2012	Kadhal Paathai	Drunkard	
2012	Mirattal	Shankar's father	
2013	Lollu Dhadha Parak Parak		Also music director
2013	Singam II	Sub Inspector Karim Bhai	
2014	Tenaliraman	Cannibal tribe leader	Uncredited role
2014	Kaaviya Thalaivan	Contract Kannaiah	
2015	Pulan Visaranai 2		
2015	Athiradi		Also producer, writer, music director
2015	Naanum Rowdy Dhaan	Mansoor	
2015	Vedalam	Manimaran	
2016	Unnodu Ka	Kasi	
2016	Enakku Innoru Per Irukku		Cameo Appearance
2016	Adra Machan Visilu	Doctor	
2016	Veera Sivaji		
2017	Bruce Lee	Minister Mansoor Ali Khan	
2017	Saravanan Irukka Bayamaen	Veerasingam	
2017	Velaikkaran	Kennedy	
2017	Konjam Konjam	Kodumudi Babu	
2018	Gulaebaghavali	Nambi	
2018	Yenda Thalaiyila Yenna Vekkala		
2018	Semma	'Attack' Balu	
2018	Itly	Kalluthu	
2018	Chekka Chivantha Vaanam	Khalid	
2018	Evanukku Engeyo Matcham Irukku	Sengalvaraayan	
2018	Silukkuvarupatti Singam	Nilakkottai Narayanan	
2018	Inba Twinkle Lilly	Kalluthu	
2019	Pottu	Swami	
2019	Natpuna Ennanu Theriyuma	Don	
2019	Jackpot	Bhai	
2022	The Legend	Politician	
2023	Bakasuran		Cameo Appearance
2023	Pichaikkaran 2	ACP Gopal	
2023	Kick	Ganesh	
2023	Leo	Hridayaraj D'Souza	
2023	80s Buildup	Diamond Thief	
2023	Sarakku	Thirupathi	
2024	Joshua: Imai Pol Kaakha	Don Shiva	
2024	Vasco Da Gama	Police Inspector	
2024	Kanguva	Francis's friend	Cameo Appearance
2025	Rajaputhiran		
2025	Surrender	Himself	
2025	Padaiyaanda Maaveeraa	Kodukkan	
2026	Karuppu Pulsar	Kaveri	
2026	Karuppu	Cold	
2026	Angikaaram		
2026	Parundhu		

=== Malayalam films ===
Year	Film	Role	Notes
1990	Shubhayathra		Uncredited role
1993	Ponnu Chami	Ratnam	
1994	Sukham Sukhakaram		
1995	Hijack	Vishwanathan	
1996	Kinnam Katta Kallan	Bindran Billa	
1996	Man of the Match	Udumbu Rajappan	
1999	Jananaayakan		
1999	Red Indians	Vayanadan	
2000	Sathyam Sivam Sundaram	Andra Ponnan	
2001	Soothradharan	Zamindar	
2024	Aavesham	Reddy	

=== Telugu films ===
Year	Film	Role	Notes
1993	Vaasthavam		
1993	Mutha Mestri	Inspector	Dubbed into Tamil as Manbhumigu Maistri
1994	Samaram		
2002	Sahasa Baludu Vichitra Kothi	Pallappa	
2004	Samba	McDowell Mani	
2006	Naayudamma		

=== Kannada films ===
Year	Film	Role	Notes
1996	Boss		
1997	Yuva Shakthi		
1997	Lady Commissioner		
2001	Diggajaru		
2007	Masti		

=== Singer ===
Year	Film	Song	Composer	Language	Notes
1993	Rajadhi Raja Raja Kulothunga Raja Marthanda Raja Gambeera Kathavaraya Krishna Kamarajan	"Mama Mama"	himself	Tamil	
1996	Vaazhga Jananayagam	"Kodambakkam"	himself	Tamil	
1996	Rajali	"Wrong Route"	Aravind	Tamil	
1998	Maru Malarchi	"Rettakili Rettakili"	S. A. Rajkumar	Tamil	
2007	Ennai Paar Yogam Varum	"Koyambedu"	A. K. Vaasagan	Tamil	
2015	Athiradi	"En Kathirikka", "Edho Paarka", "Thanniyadichu", "Yenda Thenna"	himself	Tamil	
