= Vaazhga Jananayagam =

- Directed by: E. Ramdoss
- Written by: John Amirtharaj; E. Ramadoss (dialogues)
- Produced by: J. A. Mohamed Ali
- Starring: Mansoor Ali Khan; Pragathi
- Cinematography: Thangar Bachan
- Edited by: K. M. P. Kumar
- Music by: Original Songs; Mansoor Ali Khan; Background Score; S. P. Venkatesh
- Production company: Raj Kennedy Films
- Release date: 7 March 1996
- Running time: 145 minutes
- Country: India
- Language: Tamil

Vaazhga Jananayagam (transl. Long Live Democracy) is a 1996 Tamil-language political satire film directed by E. Ramdoss. The film stars Mansoor Ali Khan and Pragathi, with John Amirtharaj, S. S. Chandran, T. S. Raghavendra, Pandu, Raveendra Babu and Mahanadi Shankar playing supporting roles. It was released on 7 March 1996, and failed at the box office.

== Plot ==
Bhagat Singh (Mansoor Ali Khan) is an angry young man who cannot tolerate injustice. He buys and sells old stuff: he owns a small junk shop. Next to his shop, there is a fruit shop owned by the bubbly girl Anjala (Pragathi) and she likes to tease the short-tempered Bhagat Singh. Meanwhile, the corrupt police officer Sivashankar (Mahanadi Shankar) is transferred to a new city, where he forces the tradespeople to give him bribes. One day, he clashes with the talkative Anjala. Bhagat Singh stops their fight and humiliates the corrupt police officer. Later, Sivashankar tries to rape Anjala but Bhagat Singh comes in time and saves her. Worried about Anjala, Bhagat Singh immediately marries her.

One day, Bhagat Singh witnesses the murder of a journalist in front of his shop. The goons then beat up Bhagat Singh for no reason, he then hits back and Bhagat Singh wounds severely the local don Zinda (Raveendra Babu). This news reaches the Minister Sisubalan (John Amirtharaj) who considered the don Zinda as his right hand. Sisubalan asks Bhagat Singh to join him but he refuses. Later that night, Bhagat Singh is arrested and beaten by the police.

In a police lockup, Bhagat Singh remembers his past. In the past, Bhagat Singh was a graduate and lived with his mother but he could not find a job. Bhagat Singh and his mother sold their house to bribe Sisubalan's accountant Ramanujam (T. S. Raghavendra). Sisubalan and Ramanujam ripped him off and Bhagat Singh's mother died due to the shock. Heartbroken, Bhagat Singh decided to become a junk dealer.

The rest of the story is how Bhagat Singh takes revenge on his enemies.

== Cast ==
- Mansoor Ali Khan as Bhagat Singh
- Pragathi as Anjala
- John Amirtharaj as Sisubalan
- S. S. Chandran
- T. S. Raghavendra as Ramanujam
- Pandu as Anjala's father
- Raveendra Babu as Zinda
- Mahanadi Shankar as Sivashankar
- Kumarimuthu
- Oru Viral Krishna Rao
- Joker Thulasi
- Krishnamoorthy as Kicha
- Nellai Siva
- Bonda Mani
- Kallukkul Eeram Ramanathan
- Singamuthu
- Arulmani as Chitragupta
- Chandrasekhar
- Delhi Ganesh in a guest appearance
- Vimalraj
- Shanmugasundari as Muniyamma
- Kokila as Maha
- Sharmili
- Kavithasri
- Revathi
- Sahadevan
- Mahadevan
- K. R. Vijaya
- V. Gowthaman in an uncredited role

== Soundtrack ==
The soundtrack was composed by Mansoor Ali Khan, who also wrote the lyrics.

Song	Singer(s)	Duration
"Amma Vanga"	Mano	3:38
"Kodambakkam"	Suresh Peters	3:29
"Saidapetta Singari"	Antony	4:54
"Aadu Machi Gopalu"	Malaysia Vasudevan	3:33
"Adi Painkiliyai"	T. S. Raghavendra	2:57
"Mazhai Penji"	T. S. Raghavendra	3:44
"ABCD Ungoppan"	Malgudi Subha	4:22
"Vaango Vaango"	Pazhani	3:56
