= Athiradi Padai =

- Poster
- Directed by: R. K. Selvamani
- Written by: R. K. Selvamani
- Produced by: K. Rajarathnam
- Starring: Rahman; Roja; Suman
- Cinematography: M. V. Panneerselvam
- Edited by: V. Udhayashankar
- Music by: Ilaiyaraaja
- Production company: R. K. Star Productions
- Release date: 10 February 1994
- Country: India
- Languages: Tamil; Telugu

Athiradi Padai (transl. Strike force) in Tamil / Samaram in Telugu is a 1994 Indian bilingual action film directed by R. K. Selvamani. The film stars Rahman, Suman, and Roja with Lakshmi, Vijayakumar and Silk Smitha play supporting roles. It was released on 10 February 1994.

== Plot ==
The film is loosely based on an acid attack on Chandralekha IAS.

IAS officer Chitralekha (Lakshmi) refuses to clear public land at low price to Adhiseshan (Puneet Issar). Adiseshan gave 30 crores to CM Ramachandra Moorthy (Kota srinivasa Rao/Vinu Chakravarthy) Adiseshan tries to halt investigation by throwing acid on Chitralekha's face, sending goons to attack her daughter Bharathi (Roja), giving sedated chocolate to Chitra's younger daughter and humiliating her in public. When the IAS officer refuses to back down, Adiseshan kills her by hanging and makes it look like suicide.

Bharathi (Roja) receives a courier containing evidences of Adiseshan and politicians scam. She plans to expose this to the public through press meet. But another politician (Mansoor Ali Khan) who promised to help her betrays and her younger sister is raped and killed by Adiseshan. She kills Mansoor Ali Khan in rage and sentenced to prison. She also finds her father (Vijayakumar) is in prison on false case.

In prison, she suffers unnecessary torture at hands of police and finally she joins rahman's gang and uncovers the truth. Finally she kills Adiseshan (Puneet Issar).

== Cast ==
- Rahman as Saatha
- Suman
- Roja as Bharathi
- Vinu Chakravarthy / Kota Srinivasa Rao
- Vijayakumar as Roja's father
- Silk Smitha
- Puneet Issar as Adiseshan
- Lakshmi as Chitralekha IAS
- Mansoor Ali Khan
- Srihari as Adiseshan's henchman
- R. Sundarrajan / Babu Mohan
- Satyanarayana as the police inspector
- Rupini
- Sriman

== Soundtrack ==
The music was composed by Ilaiyaraaja.

Tamil

Song	Singers	Lyrics	Length
"Ada Jaangurey"	S. P. Balasubrahmanyam, S. Janaki	Muthulingam	05:43
"Ennachu"	S. P. Balasubrahmanyam, S. Janaki	Vaali	05:09
"Jing Jikka"	Mano, K. S. Chithra	Vaali	02:47
"Kattalagu Pappa"	S. P. Balasubrahmanyam, S. Janaki	Muthulingam	05:05
"Senthaazhum"	K. S. Chithra	Kamakodiyan	01:12
"Vennilavin"	S. P. Balasubrahmanyam, K. S. Chithra	Kamakodiyan	05:02
"Yammaadi"	S. P. Balasubrahmanyam, S. Janaki	Vaali	01:26

Telugu

Song	Singers	Lyrics	Length
"Are Changura Changure"	S. P. Balasubrahmanyam, K. S. Chithra	Bhuvana Chandra	05:43
"Vennelalo Mallelalo"	S. P. Balasubrahmanyam, K. S. Chithra	Bhuvana Chandra	05:09
"Ammadee Ammadee"	S. P. Balasubrahmanyam, S. Janaki	Bhuvana Chandra	02:47
"Bangaru Podharinta"	Ilaiyaraaja, K. S. Chithra	Bhuvana Chandra	05:05
"Konare Konare"	K. S. Chithra	Bhuvana Chandra	01:12
"Ekkadadhi Guvva"	S. P. Balasubrahmanyam, K. S. Chithra	Bhuvana Chandra	05:02

== Reception ==
Malini Mannath of The Indian Express wrote that Selvamani's "Athiradippadai [..] has more of imagination gone astray and less of reality" and "unlike the smooth transition from scene to scene in his earlier films, here the narration is jerky". R. P. R. of Kalki found cinematography as the only appreciable aspect of the film calling angles and lighting of Hollywood type and found no other positive aspects from the film.
