= Puthiya Aatchi =

- Directed by: Velu Prabhakaran
- Written by: Velu Prabhakaran; Gajendra Kumar (dialogues)
- Produced by: R. Premavathi
- Starring: Anandaraj; Sarath Babu; Radhika
- Cinematography: Velu Prabhakaran
- Edited by: K. Srinivasa Rao
- Music by: Songs: Premi – Sreeni, Manachanallur Giridharan; Film score: Shyam
- Production company: Jayadevi Films
- Release date: 3 March 1995
- Running time: 110 minutes
- Country: India
- Language: Tamil

Puthiya Aatchi (transl. New reign) is a 1995 Indian Tamil-language vigilante action film directed by Velu Prabhakaran. The film stars Anandaraj, Radhika and Sarath Babu. It was released on 3 March 1995.

== Plot ==
Marappan (Anandaraj) is the rebel leader of 'Puratchi Padai'. The rebel group only kills corrupted politicians who spoil the poor's lives. A corrupted politician, Valluvadasan (Radha Ravi), misuses their name and he perpetrates murders of innocent people under their name.

Vivekanandan (Sarath Babu), an IPS officer, lives happily with his wife (Radhika) and his son. Vivekanandan is charged to arrest the members of 'Puratchi Padai'.

== Cast ==
- Anandaraj as Marappan
- Sarath Babu as Vivekanandhan / Vivek
- Radhika
- Radha Ravi as Valluvadasan
- S. S. Chandran as Kannusamy
- S. Gajendra Kumar
- V. Gopalakrishnan
- Meesai Murugesan
- Naga Kannan
- Idichapuli Selvaraj
- MRK
- Velu Prabhakaran as Tamizhmani
- Silk Smitha as an item number
- Janagaraj as Rajarathnam (guest appearance)
- Nirosha in a guest appearance
- Rajendran as a goon (uncredited role)

== Soundtrack ==
The songs were composed Premi–Sreeni and Manachanallur Giridharan, and the score by Shyam. The lyrics were written by Vairamuthu.

Song	Singer(s)	Duration
"Eera Kaathu Veesudhe"	S. P. Balasubrahmanyam, K. S. Chithra	4:22
"Ezhu Ezhu Vanam"	S. P. Balasubrahmanyam	3:42
"Mutharame"	Mano, K. S. Chithra	4:12
"Porakkumpothu Manishan"	Mano, S. P. Sailaja	4:38
"Va Mamara Kanmani"	K. J. Yesudas	4:56
