= Raja Muthirai =

- Poster
- Directed by: R. K. Selvamani
- Written by: R. K. Selvamani; E. Ramdoss (dialogues)
- Produced by: Vasu
- Starring: Arun Pandian; Roja; Vineetha; Raghuvaran
- Cinematography: M. V. Panneerselvam
- Edited by: V. Udhayashankar
- Music by: Raasaiya
- Production company: Varshini Pictures
- Release date: 15 February 1995
- Country: India
- Language: Tamil

Raja Muthirai (transl. Royal Seal) is a 1995 Indian Tamil-language action film directed by R. K. Selvamani and Movie Music from Raasaiya, The film stars Arun Pandian and Roja whilst Raghuvaran, Napoleon and Silk Smitha play supporting roles. It was released on 15 February, 1995, and became a modest success.

== Cast ==
- Arun Pandian as Rajkumar IPS, CBI officer
- Napoleon as Markandeyan
- Roja as Priya
- Vineetha as Abirami
- Sukumari
- C. R. Saraswathi as Sathyabama Mami
- Raghuvaran as Usman
- Mansoor Ali Khan as Fake Priest
- M. N. Nambiar
- Major Sundarrajan
- V. K. Ramasamy as Bai
- Silk Smitha

== Soundtrack ==
The music was composed by Raasaiya.

Track listing
No.	Title	Length
1.	"Mainave Mainave"
2.	"Yaaru Rambavai"

== Reception ==
Pa. Raghavan of Kalki praised Panneerselvam's cinematography as the film's positive.
