= Ravi Yadav =

Indian cinematographer

- Born: Thiruthani, Tamil Nadu, India
- Occupations: Cinematographer, film producer, film director
- Years active: 1990–present
- Spouse: Sapna Ravi Yadav
- Children: Vagmin, Rohin and Uyir

Ravi Yadav is an Indian cinematographer known for his works with directors, Abbas–Mustan and R. K. Selvamani, in the Hindi and Tamil film industries, respectively. He started doing cinematography for Films, even before completing his Diploma in Cinematography from MGR Film Institute, Chennai. He started shooting Tamil feature films with his batch mates and friends. Ravi did his debut film independently, without assisting any film maker or cinematographer. He also produced two Tamil films and later moved into Bollywood. His collaboration with Bollywood director duo Abbas and Mustan Burmawalla brought out notable Hindi films like Humraaz, Taarzan, Aitraaz, 36 China Town, Naqaab, Race 1, Players, Race 2.

== Filmography ==
Key
†	Denotes films that have not yet been released

Year	Film	Language	Notes
1988	Puthiya Vaanam	Tamil	Remake of Hukumat
1990	Pulan Visaranai	Tamil	
1992	Chembaruthi	Tamil	
1996	Devaraagam	Malayalam	
1998	Harichandra	Tamil	
1998	Kaadhal Kavithai	Tamil	
2001	Alli Thandha Vaanam	Tamil	
2001	Hum Ho Gaye Aapke	Hindi	Remake of Gokulathil Seethai
2002	Show	Telugu	
2002	Humraaz	Hindi	
2004	Taarzan: The Wonder Car	Hindi	
2004	Aitraaz	Hindi	
2005	Socha Na Tha	Hindi	
2006	36 China Town	Hindi	
2007	Naqaab	Hindi	
2007	Kuttrapathirikai	Tamil	Commenced in 1991; Also producer
2008	Race	Hindi	
2008	Telling Lies	English	
2008	Catch Your Mind	English	
2009	Mr. Fraud	Hindi	
2010	Hello Darling	Hindi	
2010	Maro Charitra	Telugu	Remake of the 1978 film of the same name Also director
2011	Thank You	Hindi	
2012	Players	Hindi	
2013	Race 2	Hindi	
2013	Phata Poster Nikla Hero	Hindi	
2014	Humshakals	Hindi	
2016	Ghayal Once Again	Hindi	
2018	Sarvam Thaala Mayam	Tamil	
2018	Manasuku Nachindi	Telugu	
2019	Prassthanam	Hindi	Remake of Prasthanam
2022	Maarrich	Hindi	
2023	Yaariyan 2	Hindi	Remake of Bangalore Days
2024	Andhagan	Tamil	Remake of Andhadhun
2025	Kis Kisko Pyaar Karoon 2	Hindi	
TBA	3 Monkeys †	Hindi	
