= Asuran (1995 film) =

- Theatrical release poster
- Directed by: Velu Prabhakaran
- Written by: Ma. Pandarinathan (Dialogue)
- Screenplay by: R. K. Selvamani
- Story by: R. K. Selvamani original story by Jim Thomas (uncredited); John Thomas (uncredited)
- Produced by: R. K. Selvamani
- Starring: Arun Pandian; Roja
- Cinematography: Velu Prabhakaran
- Edited by: V. Udhayashankar
- Music by: Adithyan
- Production company: Motherland Movies International
- Release date: 21 July 1995
- Country: India
- Language: Tamil

Asuran (transl. Demon) is a 1995 Indian Tamil-language science fiction action horror film, photographed and direction by Velu Prabhakaran and written and produced by R. K. Selvamani. The film stars Arun Pandian and Roja, while Radha Ravi, Vijayakumar, and Senthil play supporting roles and Mansoor Ali Khan reprises his role from Captain Prabhakaran. The film released on 21 July 1995 and became a box office failure. The film is an unsanctioned amalgamation of various Hollywood films, including Predator (1987).

== Cast ==
- Arun Pandian as DSP Prasad
- Roja as Parvathi (Voice dubbed by Rohini)
- Radha Ravi as Rajasekhar
- Vijayakumar as DGP Raghupathi
- Senthil as Srinivasan
- Mansoor Ali Khan as Veerabhadran
- Thiyagu as Krishnaswamy
- Thalapathi Dinesh as Chandru
- Pandu
- S. N. Lakshmi
- Vichithra as Balamani
- Krishnamoorthy
- Krishnaraj Muthuramalingam as Krishna
- Naga Kannan
- Kalyan as main dancer in "Vathikuchu Pathikuchu"
- Napoleon as Marthayan (guest appearance)

== Soundtrack ==
Music was composed by Adithyan. The programming of the song "Chakku Chakku Vathikuchi" was done by Harris Jayaraj. The song was also featured in the 2022 film Vikram where it became a trend in India after its release.

Song	Singers	Lyrics	Length
"Chakku Chakku Vathikuchi"	Adithyan, Sujatha	Piraisoodan	04:27
"Kukku Kukku"	Priya	Kamakodiyan	04:02
"Moham Pathikichu"	Gayathri	Palani Bharathi	04:28
"O Saali"	Adithyan, Sangeetha Sajith	Palani Bharathi	04:40
"O Vaanmathi"	P. Unnikrishnan, Sangeetha Sajith	Piraisoodan	05:32

== Reception ==
Thulasi of Kalki wrote since there is no such thing as story, most of the grandeur did not work out; if the viewer watches it without thinking about logic, they will get the satisfaction of watching Arabian Nights.
