= Athiradi (2015 film) =

2015 Indian-malyalam language film by Balu Anand

- Theatrical release poster
- Directed by: Balu Anand
- Written by: Mansoor Ali Khan
- Produced by: Mansoor Ali Khan
- Starring: Mansoor Ali Khan; Moumita Choudhury
- Music by: Mansoor Ali Khan
- Release date: 16 October 2015
- Country: India
- Language: Tamil

Athiradi (transl. Sudden action) is a 2015 Indian Tamil-language action comedy film directed by Balu Anand from a screenplay by Mansoor Ali Khan, who also served as the producer and music composer. The film stars Khan and Moumita Choudhury. It was released on 16 October 2015.

== Plot ==
The film is about a commoner who survives by doing aerobics.

== Cast ==
- Mansoor Ali Khan
- Moumita Choudhury
- Radha Ravi
- Senthil
- Moolai Alaghi
- King Kong
- Bonda Mani
- C. Ranganathan
- Balu Anand
- Scissor Manohar
- Ambani Shankar

== Soundtrack ==
The music was composed by Mansoor Ali Khan.

1. "Angusam Angusam" - Laila Ali Khan
2. "En Kathirikka Thottathile" - Mansoor Ali Khan, Vijaya Lakshmi
3. "Etho Paarka Latchanama" - Mansoor Ali Khan, Lakshmi Venkat
4. "Gudu Gudu Ena Odu" - Nincy
5. "Thalaivar Varrar Othiko" - Lakshmi Venkat
6. "Thanniyadichu Thanniyadichu" - Mansoor Ali Khan
7. "Yenda Thenna Marathathula" - Mansoor Ali Khan
