= Velu Prabhakaran =

Indian filmmaker, cinematographer and actor (1957–2025)

Velu Prabakaran
- Born: 1956 or 1957; Madras, Madras State, India
- Died: 18 July 2025 (aged 68); Chennai, Tamil Nadu, India
- Occupations: Film director, actor, cinematographer
- Years active: 1980–2025
- Spouse: Shirley Das

Velu Prabakaran (1956 or 1957 – 18 July 2025) was an Indian filmmaker, cinematographer, and actor, who worked in Tamil-language films. He was known for his themes highlighting atheism and revolutionary subjects in his films.

== Career ==
Prabakaran began as a cinematographer before making his directorial debut with the 1989 horror film Nalaya Manithan, before also directing its sequel Adhisaya Manithan (1990). He then made two more consecutive action films under R. K. Selvamani's production in Asuran and Rajali, both box office failures. He then worked on action films with lead characters often depicted as revolutionaries, making Kadavul (1997), Sivan (1999), and Puratchikkaaran (2000). In 2000, he began pre-production on a film titled Deepavali, and approached Kamal Haasan to play the lead role. However, the actor's rejection meant that the project was later shelved.

Prabakaran began work on the production of a film titled Kadhal Arangam in 2004, writing the story, screenplay, and dialogue for the project. Starring newcomers Preethi Rangayani and Shirley Das, he revealed that the film would expose the falsehood of kama in society, though he later gave directorial credits of the film to his brother Velu Raja. The film also takes on the prevailing caste system and explores sexuality. Film censors were not willing to give it a certificate due to objectionable scenes and an ongoing battle with the censor board emerged in December 2004. In December 2006, Prabakaran made an emotional appeal at a press conference, stating that the film touched upon issues of social concern and stressed the importance of sex education amongst youngsters. In 2009, he finally agreed to tone down the scenes and mute certain dialogues and to compromise with the censors on the film, and changed the title from Kadhal Arangam ("Love Arena") to Kadhal Kathai ("Love Story"). In the title credits of the film, Prabakaran included an extended scene which narrates his opinions and difficulties of the film's release. He noted that parts were autobiographical. The film opened to very negative reviews from critics, with one reviewer noting "the movie has apparently no script or whatever and is a string of events interspersed with sex scenes." Another critic noted "it's too boring to even qualify as a sex flick", describing the film as "unwatchable".

In 2009, he signed on to direct a film titled Deva Dasi telling the tale of a 16th-century romance. During delays, he began another project titled Mugamoodi Koothu and then another titled Kalainganin Kadhal, in which he would play the lead roles. The projects failed to take off and Prabakaran kept away from the film industry for a number of years before releasing a teaser trailer to Oru Iyakkunarin Kadhal Diary in January 2017.

== Personal life and death ==
Prabhakaran was once married to actress and director P. Jayadevi. In June 2017, Prabakaran announced his marriage to Shirley Das, who had acted in his film Kadhal Kadhai (2009).

Prabhakaran died after a long illness on 18 July 2025, at the age of 68.

== Filmography ==
Year	Title	Credited as			Notes
Year	Title	Director	Writer	Cinematographer	Notes
1980	Ivargal Vithyasamanavargal			✓	
1980	Matravai Neril			✓	
1989	Nalaya Manithan	✓	✓	✓	
1989	Sariyana Jodi	✓		✓	
1989	Pick Pocket			✓	
1990	Adhisaya Manithan	✓			
1991	Uruvam			✓	
1993	Uthama Raasa			✓	
1995	Puthiya Aatchi	✓	✓	✓	
1995	Asuran	✓		✓	
1996	Rajali	✓		✓	
1997	Kadavul	✓	✓		Tamil Nadu State Film Award for Best Dialogue Writer
1999	Sivan	✓	✓	✓	
2000	Puratchikkaaran	✓	✓		
2003	Vikadan			✓	
2009	Kadhal Kadhai	✓	✓		
2017	Oru Iyakkunarin Kadhal Diary	✓	✓		

=== As an actor ===
Year	Title	Role	Notes
1989	Sariyana Jodi		
1995	Puthiya Aatchi	Tamizhmani	
1997	Kadavul	Rajapandi	
2000	Puratchikkaaran	Tamizhmani	
2007	Naalaiya Pozhuthum Unnodu		
2009	Kadhal Kadhai	Himself	
2011	Pathinaaru		
2017	Oru Iyakkunarin Kadhal Diary		
2019	Gangs of Madras		
2021	Jango		
2021	Anti Indian	Hajiyar	
2022	Cadaver		
2023	Pizza 3: The Mummy		
2023	Raid		
2024	Weapon	Omkar	
2024	Appu VI STD		
2025	Gajaana		
