= Balu Anand =

Indian actor and director

- Born: c. 1954; Kalampalayam, Coimbatore, Tamil Nadu
- Died: 3 June 2016 (aged 62); Kalampalayam, Coimbatore, Tamil Nadu
- Occupations: Director; Actor
- Years active: 1982-2016

Balu Anand (1954 – 3 June 2016) was an Indian actor and director who worked in Tamil-language films (Kollywood). He appeared in over 100 films as an actor and directed several films, such as Naane Raja Naane Mandhiri, Annanagar Mudhal Theru and Unakkaga Piranthen.

== Career ==
Anand was supposed to make his directorial debut with a film Idhazhgalin Azhaipithazh with Kapil Dev and Nalini, however it was shelved. He is known as the director of successful films Naane Raja Naane Mandhiri (his directorial debut) starring Vijayakanth and the Sathyaraj, Radha, Ambika starrer Annanagar Mudhal Theru, a remake of Malayalam film Gandhinagar 2nd Street.

In the early 2000s, Anand attempted to make a comeback through two films as a director, Paapoo...Paapoo and Low Class Loganathan, but neither film was theatrically released. His last directorial venture Anandha Thollai starring Powerstar Srinivasan is still unreleased.

== Death ==
Anand died of a heart attack in his home town of Kalampalayam.

== Filmography ==
=== As director ===
Year	Film
1985	Naane Raja Naane Mandhiri
1986	Rasigan Oru Rasigai
1986	Endravathu Oru Naal
1988	Annanagar Mudhal Theru
1992	Unakkaga Piranthen
1993	Rajadhi Raja Raja Kulothunga Raja Marthanda Raja Gambeera Kathavaraya Krishna Kamarajan
1995	Sindhu Bath
2013	Sandhithathum Sindhithathum
2015	Athiradi

=== As actor ===
Year	Film	Role	Notes
1982	Antha Rathirikku Satchi Illai		
1989	Rajadhi Raja	Lorry Driver	
1990	Engitta Mothathay	Mutton shop owner	
1991	Naadu Adhai Naadu	Driver of Bullock cart	
1992	Thirumathi Palanisamy	Priest	
1994	En Aasai Machan	Nachimuthu	
1995	Gandhi Pirantha Mann		
1996	Dhinamum Ennai Gavani		
1996	Aavathum Pennale Azhivathum Pennale	Manush	
1996	Thayagam		
1996	Tata Birla	Deluxe Pandiyan	
1997	Gopura Deepam		
1997	Dhinamum Ennai Gavani		
1997	Pistha		
1997	Aahaa Enna Porutham	Kunju Gounder	
1997	Thedinen Vanthathu	Peter Pandian	
1997	Pagaivan	Security guard	
1998	Ulavuthurai	Neurotic	
1999	Annan		
1999	Suyamvaram	Kanna's father	
1999	Unakkaga Ellam Unakkaga		
1999	Manaivikku Mariyadhai		
2000	Vaanathaippola	Ramasamy	
2000	James Pandu	Railway Porter	
2000	Kannaal Pesavaa	Poongodi's grandfather	
2000	Unnai Kann Theduthey	Pattabi	
2000	Vanna Thamizh Pattu	Velusamy	
2001	Paarvai Ondre Podhume	Murugan	
2001	Krishna Krishna	Unnikrishnan	
2001	Kunguma Pottu Gounder	Textile shop owner	
2001	Lovely	Chandru's relative	
2001	Star	Police inspector	
2001	Alli Thandha Vaanam		
2002	Pammal K. Sambandam	Police Inspector	
2002	Unnai Ninaithu	Radha's father	
2002	Guruvamma		
2003	Anbe Sivam	Train Ticket Checker	
2003	Anbu Thollai		
2003	Diwan		
2003	Jay Jay		
2004	Image		
2004	Settai		
2004	Vayasu Pasanga	Vicky's father	
2004	Super Da		
2004	Arivumani		
2004	En Purushan Ethir Veetu Ponnu	Rekha's father	
2005	Kadhal FM	Balaji	
2005	Pesuvoma	Shanmugam	
2005	Englishkaran		
2006	Kusthi		
2006	Vattaram		
2006	Vanjagan	Avudaiyappan	
2007	Kalakkura Chandru	Police inspector	
2007	Nee Naan Nila	Ulundurpet Uthamarasu	
2007	Veerappu	Police Inspector	
2008	Pazhani	Jail warden	
2008	Kasimedu Govindan	Vedi Muthu	
2009	Padikkadavan	Shanmugam	
2009	Unnai Kann Theduthe		
2009	Engal Aasan		
2009	Vedappan	Vedappan's father	
2010	Rasikkum Seemane		
2010	Pournami Nagam		
2010	Pollachi Mappillai	Sali Veera	
2010	Aattanayagann		
2012	Vachathi		
2015	Athiradi		
2016	Manithan	Constable	

=== As voice actor ===
Year	Film	Notes
1996	Enakkoru Magan Pirappan	Mimicking Goundamani's voice
1996	Aanazhagan	Mimicking Manivannan's voice
