= Captain Prabhakaran =

1991 film by R.K. Selvamani

- Poster
- Directed by: R. K. Selvamani
- Produced by: Ibrahim Rowther
- Screenplay by: R. K. Selvamani
- Story by: Batten Boss (K. M. Chacko )
- Dialogues by: Liaquat Ali Khan
- Starring: Vijayakanth
- Cinematography: Rajarajan; A. Ramesh Kumar
- Edited by: G. Jayachandran; V. Udhayashankar
- Music by: Ilaiyaraaja
- Production company: I. V. Cine Productions
- Release date: 14 April 1991
- Running time: 162 minutes
- Country: India
- Language: Tamil

Captain Prabhakaran is a 1991 Indian Tamil-language action film directed by R. K. Selvamani. The film stars Vijayakanth, leading an ensemble cast that includes M. N. Nambiar, Sarathkumar, J. Livingston (credited as Ranjan), Rupini, Ramya Krishnan and Mansoor Ali Khan, in his first major role. It was Vijayakanth's 100th film, and popularised the sobriquet "captain" for him.

The character of the antagonist Veerabhadran, played by Mansoor Ali Khan, is loosely based on the forest brigand Veerappan. The title of the film was inspired from Velupillai Prabhakaran, the leader of the Liberation Tigers of Tamil Eelam. Upon its release, the film became a blockbuster at the box office.

== Plot ==
Captain Prabhakaran is an DFO in Indian Forest Service (IFS) officer sent to Sathyamangalam to nab Veerabhadran, who tortures the people of that place. Prabhakaran is not only going to nab Veerabhadran, but also avenge the death of his friend and fellow IFS officer Rajaraman, who was killed by Veerabhadran. The police commissioner and the district collector are corrupt and also support Veerabhadran. In the climax, Veerabhadran kidnaps Prabhakaran's wife and son. Prabhakaran arrives at the right time and saves his wife and son. He then nabs Veerabhadran. Poongkodi was Rajaraman's lover. She dies while giving birth to his child. Veerabhadran is shot dead by the corrupt inspector and collector. Prabhakaran kills both of them. He is then dragged to court for killing the police inspector and the collector. Prabhakaran tells the truth that they were corrupt, and the film ends with Prabhakaran being acquitted by the court.

== Cast ==
- Vijayakanth as DFO Captain Prabhakaran IFS
- M. N. Nambiar as Police Commissioner S. Ramanathan
- Sarathkumar as Rajaraman IFS
- Livingston as Krishnamurthy
- Rupini as Gayathri
- Ramya Krishnan as Poongkodi
- Gandhimathi as Fathima Beevi
- Yuvasri as Lalitha, Rajaraman's Younger Sister
- Peeli Sivam as Raja
- V. M. John as Minister Sabanayagam
- Mansoor Ali Khan as Veerabhadran
- Ponnambalam as Sub Inspector (uncredited)
- LIC Narasimhan as Police officer Sriram (uncredited)
- Karikalan as Veerabhadran's henchman (uncredited)

== Production ==
After the success of Pulan Visaranai, producer Ibrahim Rowther decided to make another project with star Vijayakanth and director R. K. Selvamani titled Captain Prabhakaran, the plotline of the film was based on the forest brigand Veerappan. The film also was the 100th project of Vijayakanth. Since majority of the scenes were set in a forest, Selvamani who was scouting locations all over India finally zeroed in Chalakudy. The filming was held at Chalakudy for 60 days. Many scenes were also filmed at Athirappilly Falls. Due to excessive rainfall and accidents happened there, Rowther ordered Selvamani to conduct remaining filming at Mundanthurai forest at Thirunelveli; however, Selvamani was unimpressed with that location and choose to film again at Chalakudy. The film had Mansoor Ali Khan in his first major role, for which Karikalan was the initial choice who was removed after Selvamani felt he looked disinterested in portraying the role of Veerabhadran. However Karikalan did appear as an extra portraying one of Veerabhadran's henchman. During the shoot, a rope to which Vijayakanth was bound snapped and his shoulder got dislocated. With both his hands tied he screamed in pain, but this was mistaken for acting, and as a result, there was a delay in getting medical assistance. Saranya Ponvannan was originally cast as Poongudi, but left as the role was glamorous; the role went to Ramya Krishnan. A train fight sequence was shot at Andipatti Mountain Pass for four days with 100 horses.

== Soundtrack ==
The soundtrack has only two songs, both composed by Ilaiyaraaja. The song "Aattama Therottama" is set in the Carnatic raga known as Sindhu Bhairavi. It was later remixed by Prasanna Sekhar in Singakutty (2008).

Track listing
No.	Title	Lyrics	Singer(s)	Length
1.	"Paasamulla Paandiyare"	Gangai Amaran	Mano, K. S. Chithra	5:09
2.	"Aattama Therottama"	Piraisoodan	Swarnalatha	5:12
Total length:				10:21

== Reception ==
On 19 April 1991, The Indian Express wrote, "The strength of the film is its visual vibrancy and the narrative line too has a great measure of cohesion, despite it being an action film all the way". On 26 April, The Hindu wrote, "Vijayakanth doing his rough stuff with his known felicity, particularly the fights on top of the moving train, the horse riding horde of Veerabadran's men in Sholay fashion trying to stop him". Unlike other Tamil actors who did not face success with their 100th film, Vijayakanth was considered by N. Kesavan of The Hindu to have broken that jinx. Rajarajan won the Cinema Express Award for Best Cameraman.

== Re-release ==
The film was re-released in 4K quality on 22 August 2025 and was digitalized with Dolby sound.
