= Makkal Aatchi =

- Theatrical release poster
- Directed by: R. K. Selvamani
- Written by: E. Ramdoss; Liaquat Ali Khan (dialogues)
- Screenplay by: R. K. Selvamani
- Story by: P. Kalaimani
- Produced by: Thirupur A. Selvaraj
- Starring: Mammootty; Roja; Ranjitha
- Cinematography: M. V. Panneerselvam
- Edited by: V. Udhayashankar
- Music by: Ilaiyaraaja
- Production company: Aarthi International
- Release date: 23 October 1995
- Country: India
- Language: Tamil

Makkal Aatchi (transl. People's rule) is a 1995 Indian Tamil-language political thriller film written by E. Ramdoss, directed by R. K. Selvamani and Movie Music from Ilaiyaraaja produced by Thirupur A. Selvaraj under Aarthi International. The film stars Mammootty, Roja and Ranjitha, while Aishwarya, Anandaraj and Livingston play supporting roles. It revolves around a common man who accidentally finds a stash of money which he then uses to become a politician. The film was released on 23 October 1995, during Diwali, and became a box office success.

== Plot ==
Sethupathi, a common man, accidentally finds a large amount of money in a truck. He decides to use the money to enter politics and ends up becoming the Chief Minister of Tamil Nadu.

== Cast ==
- Mammootty as Sedhupathy
- Roja as Sarasu
- Ranjitha as Parvathi
- Aishwarya as Manjula (Guest Appearance)
- Radharavi as Parvathi's father
- R. Sundarrajan as Seetharaman
- Livingston as Govindhasamy
- Anandaraj as Rangachari
- Mansoor Ali Khan as Valayapathy

== Soundtrack ==
The music was composed by Ilaiyaraaja.

Song	Singers	Lyrics	Length
"Ippothu Ena"	Lekha	Palani Bharathi	5:06
"Kathavukku Kathavu"	Swarnalatha	Kamakodiyan	6:00
"Kottu Melangal"	K. S. Chithra	Muthulingam	5:09
"Melooru Maaman"	K. S. Chithra	Mu. Metha	5:05
"Nam Naadu"	Malaysia Vasudevan, Swarnalatha	Vaali	5:17

== Release and reception ==
Makkal Aatchi was released on 23 October 1995, during Diwali, and was dubbed into Malayalam as Ente Naadu. Despite facing competition from other Diwali releases including Muthu and Kuruthipunal, it was a box office success. Thulasi of Kalki called it a must watch film. D. S. Ramanujam of The Hindu wrote, "The happenings in the political arena, particularly in Tamil Nadu, are fitted aptly in the screenplay of the director".
