= R. K. Selvamani =

Indian film director (born 1965)

- Selvamani at Irumbu Thirai success meet
- Born: 21 October 1965 (age 60); Thirumukkadal, Chengalpattu, Tamil Nadu, India
- Occupations: Film director, film producer
- Years active: 1990–present
- Spouse: Roja (m. 2002)
- Children: 2

R.K. Selvamani (born 21 October 1965) is an Indian Tamil film director. He is known to make films in the police or whodunit genres.

== Career ==
Born in Chengalpattu, R. K. Selvamani, an assistant of Manivannan, narrated a story line to Vijayakanth who then insisted Selvamani narrate the story to his friend, film producer Ibrahim Rowther. After being told that the actor was busy, Selvamani with the help of his friend Jothi decided to narrate the story through drawn pictures by having Hollywood films as reference and was given the opportunity to make the film.

The action thriller Pulan Visaranai (1990) was partly based on a real life confession by criminal Auto Shankar that he had kidnapped many girls at the behest of some political bigwigs and featured Vijayakanth alongside Rupini, Anandaraj, Radha Ravi and Sarathkumar in his first major role.

R.K. Selvamani initially imposed many rules and conditions which led to the cancelling of shooting for six months after the actor became displeased, but with the help of Manivannan, shooting was continued. The film was released in January 1990 and became successful film at the box-office, also going on to win critical acclaim by reviewers. The success of the film prompted Rowther to offer the actor and director another venture, with Selvamani making Captain Prabhakaran (1991). The title of the film was an homage to Prabhakaran, the LTTE leader, while the plotline was based on the forest brigand Veerappan. It marked the hundredth project of Vijayakanth and featured Rupini and Sarath Kumar again in pivotal roles. The film also became a large commercial success and Selvamani began to gain plaudits for his ability as a film director in the action genre.

Selvamani agreed to work on a film produced by Ravi Yadav with music scored by Ilaiyaraaja, having late Prime Minister Rajiv Gandhi's assassination and the Sri Lankan civil war as its backdrop. Production work for the film, Kuttrapathirikai began in 1991 and it would feature Ramki, Rahman, Ramya Krishnan and Roja, in her second film, in the leading roles.

The film was launched in July 1991 and completed after short delays during December 1992. The film was stuck for fourteen years as the censor board refused to allow such a film with a drastic political message to be released, with Selvamani having no option but to move on to direct other films. In December 2006, in a landmark judgement, the Madras High Court dismissed a petition filed on behalf of the Central Board of Censors against an earlier verdict by the court, allowing the screening of the film with an 'A' certificate after certain cuts. The court subsequently directed the board to award an 'A' certificate to the film within four weeks of their judgement.

The petition had initially alleged that the film supported the Liberation Tigers of Tamil Eelam (LTTE), while sections of the Tamil Nadu Congress had also taken exception to some scenes in the film. Selvamani revealed that the court had actually said there is no need to delete the portions, which the earlier verdict wanted to be cut. The scenes, which the censors wanted to cut, included the Tigers' training and police officers fleeing the venue, where Rajiv Gandhi was assassinated. The film won positive reviews after release in March 2007 with a critic stating "it is an interesting attempt to thread reality and some wonderful domestic drama. The style of the narration and the camera angles are slightly dated. But you cannot hold the director responsible for that." Other critics also questioned the ban, citing it was just "another run of the mill action film", with lookalikes used to represent real life characters.

He then made Chembaruthi an unusual love story starring Prashanth and Roja in 1992. In 1995, he worked again with Prashanth, making another romantic action film Kanmani (1994), which featured him alongside Mohini. The film won average reviews with a critic noting "though not very convincing and as powerful a story as he might have intended this to be, R. K. Selvamani still manages to keep one engrossed for most of the time with a narration sans hitches." Selvamani next worked on a political film titled Makkal Aatchi with Mammootty in the lead, which won critical and commercial acclaim after release in October 1995. The film's dialogues by Liaquat Ali Khan, won rave reviews. He then collaborated with another film maker Velu Prabhakaran, writing the script for two of his films, Asuran (1995) and Rajali (1996). He then produced and directed Athiradi Padai, film was flopped and Selvamani incurred huge losses.

He then made a quick action film Adimai Changili (1997) with Arjun, Roja and Rambha in the leading roles. During the making of the film, it was reported that Rambha fell out with the director due to his excessive promotion of the film's other heroine Roja over her.

The story was taken in forest areas and is based on a true story where a small community fights against majority rule. The film released to poor reviews and became a disaster at the box office. The success of Makkal Aatchi, prompted the actor and director to come together in another political film titled Arasiyal (1997). The director, prior to release, played down any potential controversial story plots and indicated it would be more about a politician's personal life rather than his work. The team shot across North India in 1997 with scenes also filmed at the Harmandir Sahib, Punjab.

The film fared less well critically than the previous collaboration, with a reviewer noting "the director is caught in a cross-fire between, coming out with a realistic movie, and at the same time, one with the hero running around the trees, and the heroine." It, however, went on to win the third place award in the category for Best Film at the Tamil Nadu State Awards. Selvamani once again launched another political drama venture titled Indian Express in 1997, which would narrate the happenings of an event which had occurred in Trivandrum. However, despite signing up Sarath Kumar to play the lead role as well as Khushbu, Roja and Anupam Kher, the film became stalled and was discontinued after the launch. He instead went on to make a big budget Telugu action film, Rajasthan with Sarathkumar and Vijayashanti. The film was later dubbed and released in Tamil with a few re-shot scenes and a reworked storyline to relate to Tamil Nadu instead of Andhra Pradesh. A critic noted the director was "losing his touch", criticising that aspects were almost "cartoonish" but praised his ability to maintain the viewer's suspense. A further film titled Operation Veerappa, based on the kidnapping of actor Rajkumar by dacoit Veerappan, was announced in 2001 but later dropped.

He returned briefly to direct his partner Roja's 100th film, Durga, a Telugu language devotional subject. The film opened in 2001 to poor reviews, with a critic noting it "lacks the distinctive touch" of the director, the film was simultaneously shot in Tamil as Pottu Amman with his brother being credited as the director for Tamil version. Another film which he launched during the project, Police Commissioner featuring Sathyaraj, was shelved shortly after production began. Selvamani became the managing director of a channel named "Thamizh Thirai" in 2003, working to form a new cable television channel, which would be run by film producers and help assist them financially, bypassing network channels. He was engaged in a series of legal tussles before the channel was finally launched to air in May 2005. The project ran into troubles shortly after, with Selvamani opting out of his role to re-begin work as a director. He was also involved in his wife Roja's election campaign in 2005, taking charge of her promotional activities and trying to ensure maximum publicity. Selvamani began working on Pulan Visaranai 2 in November 2005, a sequel to his 1990 film, and cast Prashanth in the leading role of the investigative cop.

He revealed that the idea had come to him in the early 2000s and Vijayakanth's unavailability had meant the film only materialised after a delay. Prashanth underwent strength training for the venture, while beauty pageant winner Medha Raghunath was briefly signed on to play the lead female role, before opting out again. The film progressed slowly, also a result of Prashanth's marital problems, and reports in May 2007 suggested that Rowther was unhappy with the film's content and felt the film lacked a proper storyline unlike the previous version. The film ran into problems with the censor in April 2008, with the committee highlighting twenty-six objectionable scenes. Selvamani subsequently appealed and compromised by agreeing to remove controversial dialogues and a sequence which involved an actress depicting Indian tennis player Sania Mirza. The producer subsequently accepted an "A" certificate for the film, with the soundtrack releasing the following week. The team also revealed that the film would be released the following month, though this proved to be untrue.

After a long period of delay, the film was released in 2015. Selvamani chose to take a break from films and remain heavily involved in running the Tamil Nadu Film Directors' Association, working to increase salary for assistant directors and helping conduct celebratory events.

The director re-emerged after a sabbatical from film making in 2013, announcing that he was working on a project titled Kannivedi featuring newcomers. He revealed that the film would wove a triangular love story into present day problems in society, adding that he will also feature as an actor in the film, however the project was shelved after announcement. Selvamani made his acting debut portraying negative role in Express (2017).

R.K. Selvamani is the current Secretary of the Tamil Nadu Directors association.

== Personal life ==
Selvamani married actress Roja on 10 August 2002. The couple has a daughter and a son.

== Filmography ==
=== As film director ===
- Note: all films are in Tamil, unless otherwise noted.

Year	Film	Notes		
Year	Film	Notes	1990	Pulan Visaranai
1991	Captain Prabhakaran			
1992	Chembaruthi			
1994	Athiradi Padai			
1994	Samaram	Telugu film		
1994	Kanmani			
1995	Raja Muthirai			
1995	Makkal Aatchi			
1997	Adimai Changili			
1997	Arasiyal	Tamil Nadu State Film Award for Best Film (Third Prize)		
1999	Rajasthan			
2001	Durga	Telugu film		
2007	Kuttrapathirikai			
2015	Pulan Visaranai 2			

=== As writer and producer ===
Year	Film	Credited as		Notes
Year	Film	Writer	Producer	Notes
1993	Pon Vilangu	✓	✗	
1995	Asuran	✓	✓	
1996	Rajali	✓	✓	

== Television ==
Year	Title	Role	Network
2024	Super Singer Season 10	Guest	Star Vijay

Actor

- Vaigai Express (2017)
- Nirangal Moondru (2024)
