= List of Telugu films of 1991 =

This is a list of films produced by the Tollywood (Telugu language film industry) based in Hyderabad in the year 1991.

== List of released films ==
Title	Director	Cast	Sources
Aada Pilla	K. Vasu	Harish, Kinnera	
Aagraham	K. S. Ravikumar	Rajasekhar, Amala	
Aditya 369	Singeetham Sreenivasa Rao	Balakrishna, Mohini, Tarun, Tinnu Anand, Silk Smitha	
Alludu Diddina Kapuram	Krishna Ghattamaneni	Krishna, Shobana, Mohan Babu	
Amma	Suresh Krissna	Sharat Babu, Suhasini, Brahmanandam	
Amma Kadupu Challaga	Boyina Subbarao	Sanjay Mitra, Yamuna	
Amma Rajinama	Dasari Narayana Rao	Sharada, Sai Kumar, Brahmanandam	
April 1 Vidudala	Vamsy	Rajendra Prasad, Shobana	
Assembly Rowdy	B. Gopal	Mohan Babu, Divya Bharati, Brahmanandam	
Ashwini	Ramoji Rao	Bhanuchander, Ashwini Nachappa	
Athiradhudu	A. Chandra	Bhanuchander, Nirosha	
Athma Bandham	Sunil Varma	Suman, Lizzy, Brahmanandam	
Attintlo Adde Mogudu	Relangi Narasimha Rao	Rajendra Prasad, Nirosha	
Bharat Bandh	Kodi Ramakrishna	Vinod Kumar Alva, Archana, Rami Reddy	
Bhargava	R. S. Ramaraju	Suman, Bindhiya	
Brahmarshi Vishwamitra	NTR	NTR, Nandamuri Balakrishna, Meenakshi Sheshadri	
Chitram Bhalare Vichitram	P N Ramachander Rao	Naresh, Rajani, Brahmanandam, Subhalekha Sudhakar	
Coolie No. 1	K. Raghavendra Rao	Daggubati Venkatesh, Tabu, Mohan Babu, Rao Gopal Rao	
Edurinti Mogudu Pakkinti Pellam	Relangi Narasimha Rao	Rajendra Prasad, Divya Vani	
Gang Leader	Vijaya Bapineedu	Chiranjeevi, Vijaya Shanti, Sumalatha, R. Sarathkumar	
Iddaru Pellala Muddula Police	Relangi Narasimha Rao	Rajendra Prasad, Divya Vani, Anusha	
Indra Bhavanam	Krishna	Krishna, Krishnam Raju, Meena	
Jaitra Yatra	Uppalapati Narayana Rao	Nagarjuna, Vijaya Shanti	
Kalikalam	Muthyala Subbaiah	Chandra Mohan, Jayasudha, Saikumar Pudipeddi	
Keechu Raallu	Geetha Krishna	Bhanu Chander, Shobana, Shamili	
Kobbari Bondam	Katragadda Ravi Teja	Rajendra Prasad, Nirosha	
Kshana Kshanam	Ram Gopal Varma	Daggubati Venkatesh, Sridevi, Paresh Rawal	
Madhura Nagarilo	Kodi Ramakrishna	Suresh, Srikanth, Meena, Nirosha	
Mamagaru	Muthyala Subbaiah	Vinod Kumar Alva, Dasari Narayana Rao, Yamuna	
Minor Raja	Katragadda Ravi Teja	Rajendra Prasad, Shobana, Rekha	
Naa Ille Naa Swargam	K. Rushyendra Reddy	Krishna, Ramesh Babu, Divya Bharti, Roopa Ganguly	
Naa Pellam Naa Ishtam	Gedhada Anand Babu	Naresh, Vijaya Rekha, Brahmanandam, Vijaya Lalitha	
Nagastharam	Krishna	Krishna, Vijaya Shanti	
Nayakuralu	Sathya Reddy	Seetha, Sharada	
Nirnayam	Priyadarshan	Nagarjuna, Amala	
Niyantha	Dasari Narayana Rao	Vinod Kumar Alva, Sithara	
Pandirimancham	Omkar	Jagapathi Babu, Bhagyalakshmi, Radha	
Parama Sivudu	G. Anil Kumar	Krishna Ghattamaneni, Radha, Ramesh Aravind, Ramya Krishna	
Parishkaram	Tarani	Jagapati Babu, Kinnera, Nagendra Babu, Vani Viswanath	
Peddintalludu	Sarath	Suman, Nagma, Mohan Babu, Vanisri	
Pelli Pustakam	Bapu	Rajendra Prasad, Divya Vani	
People's Encounter	Mohan Gandhi	Vinod Kumar Alva, Bhanupriya, Srikanth	
Prardhana	K. Vijaya Bhaskar	Suresh, Anjali, Charuhasan	
Prema Entha Madhuram	Jandhyala	Naresh, Mayuri Kango, Kota Srinivasa Rao	
Prema Thapassu	Dr. N. Shiva Prasad	Rajendra Prasad, Roja	
Ramudu Kadu Rakshasudu	Dasari Narayana Rao	Suman, Bhanupriya, Radha	
Rowdy Alludu	K. Raghavendra Rao	Chiranjeevi, Divya Bharati, Shobana	
Rowdy Gaari Pellam	K. S. Prakash Rao	Mohan Babu, Shobana	
Sarpayagam	Paruchuri Brothers	Sobhan Babu, Vani Viswanath, Roja Selvamani	
Seetharamayya Gari Manavaralu	Kranthi Kumar	Akkineni Nageswara Rao, Meena, Rohini Hattangadi	
Shanti Kranti	V. Ravichandran	Nagarjuna Akkineni, V. Ravichandran, Juhi Chawla, Khushbu	
Siva Shakthi	Tammareddy Bharadwaja	Naresh, Lizzy	
Sri Edukondala Swaami	Kamalakara Kameswara Rao	Arun Govil, Bhanupriya, Daggubati Raja, Shabnam	
Stuartpuram Police Station	Yandamuri Veerendranath	Chiranjeevi, Vijaya Shanti, Nirosha	
Stuvartpuram Dongalu	Sagar	Bhanu Chander, Lissy	
Surya IPS	A. Kodandarami Reddy	Venkatesh, Vijaya Shanti	
Talli Tandrulu	T. Rama Rao	Nandamuri Balakrishna, Vijaya Shanti	
Teneteega	M. Nanda Kumar	Rajendra Prasad, Sithara	
Vichitra Prema	Jandhyala	Rajendra Prasad, Amurtha	
Yerra Mandaram	Muthyala Subbaiah	Rajendra Prasad, Yamuna	
Yugantam	Katragadda Ravi Teja		
