= Puttur, Andhra Pradesh Assembly constituency =

Former constituency of the Andhra Pradesh legislative assembly, India

Coordinates: 13.44°N 79.55°E

Puttur
- Former constituency for the Andhra Pradesh Legislative Assembly

Constituency details
- Country: India
- Region: South India
- State: Andhra Pradesh
- District: Chittoor
- Established: 1951
- Abolished: 2008
- Reservation: None

Puttur Assembly constituency was an Assembly constituency of the Madras Legislative Assembly until States Reorganisation Act, 1956 transferred it to the Andhra Pradesh Legislative Assembly, India. It was one of constituencies in Chittoor district.

== Overview ==
It was part of the Chittoor Lok Sabha constituency.

== Members of the Legislative Assembly ==
=== Madras State ===
- 1951: Kumaraswamy Rajah Bahadur (Raja of Karvetnagar), Kisan Mazdoor Praja Party
- 1952 by-election: RBV Sundarsana Varma, Indian National Congress

=== Andhra State ===
- 1955: Tarimela Ramachandrareddi, Indian National Congress

=== Andhra Pradesh ===
Year	Member	Political party
1962	Tarimela Nagireddy	Communist Party of India
1967	G. Sivaiah	Communist Party of India
1972	Elavarthi Gopal Raju	Indian National Congress
1978	KB Siddaiah	Janata Party
1983	Gali Muddukrishnama Naidu	Telugu Desam Party
1985	Gali Muddukrishnama Naidu	Telugu Desam Party
1989	Gali Muddukrishnama Naidu	Telugu Desam Party
1994	Gali Muddukrishnama Naidu	Telugu Desam Party
1999	Reddivari Rajasekhar Reddy	Telugu Desam Party
2004	Gali Muddukrishnama Naidu	Indian National Congress

2008 onwards: Nagari. This Assembly constituency was merged with neighbouring Nagari seat. The longest serving legislator of this erstwhile Puttur constituency Mr.Gali Muddukrishnama Naidu got elected from Nagari in 2009 elections and lost against Actress turned Politician RK Roja in 2014 elections.

== Election results ==
=== 2004 ===
2004 Andhra Pradesh Legislative Assembly election: Puttur
Party	Candidate	Votes	%	±%
INC	Gali Muddhu Krishnama Naidu	65,788	62.49	
TDP	Kandati Sankar Reddy	35,837	34.04	
Margin of victory		29,951	28.45	
Turnout		1,05,284	75.73	
Registered electors		1,39,019		
INC gain from TDP		Swing		

=== 1952 ===
1952 Madras Legislative Assembly election: Puttur
Party	Candidate	Votes	%	±%
KMPP	Kumaraswami Rajah Bahadur	37,500	76.80	
INC	B. Ramakrishna Raju	11,331	23.20	23.20
Margin of victory		26,169	53.59	
Turnout		48,831	58.56	
Registered electors		83,392		
KMPP win (new seat)				

== See also ==
- List of constituencies of Andhra Pradesh Legislative Assembly
