= G. V. Anjaneyulu =

Indian politician

Member of Legislative Assembly Andhra Pradesh
- Incumbent
- Assumed office 2024
- Preceded by: Bolla Brahma Naidu
- Constituency: Vinukonda
- In office 2009–2019
- Preceded by: Makkena Mallikarjuna Rao
- Succeeded by: Bolla Brahma Naidu
- Constituency: Vinukonda

Personal details
- Born: 14 July 1966 (age 60) Kothapet, Vinukonda, Palnadu, Andhra Pradesh, India
- Citizenship: Indian
- Party: Telugu Desam Party
- Spouse: Gonuguntla Leelavathi
- Children: 2
- Parent(s): Satyanarayana; Venkata Chalavamma
- Occupation: Business
- Profession: Politician

Gonuguntla Venkat Shiva Sita Rama Anjaneyulu (born 14 July 1966) is an Indian politician who was elected as the Member of the Legislative Assembly for Vinukonda constituency in Andhra Pradesh, India in 2009. He represents the Telugu Desam Party.

== Biography ==
He won in 2009 Assembly Election with 51.90% of votes gained for Telugu Desam Party in Vinukonda constituency. In 2014 Assembly Elections he also won with 52.77% of votes gained for Telugu Desam Party (TDP) in Vinukonda constituency.

Anjaneyulu was born in an agricultural family, from Inumella village in Ipur mandal Guntur Dt. of A.P. He is a graduate in science (B.Sc.). He is married to Gonuguntla Leelavathi and they have two children.

== Political career ==
Anjaneyulu is a member of the Telugu Desam Party (TDP) and has represented the Vinukonda constituency in the Andhra Pradesh Legislative Assembly. His political journey saw significant victories in the 2009 and 2014 Assembly Elections, where he secured 51.90% and 52.77% of the votes, respectively, for the Telugu Desam Party in Vinukonda Constituency. His dedication to public service and his ability to connect with constituents have earned him a clean image and a high reputation among the general public, government, and non-government circles.

Lead India 2020

The group started as Sivasakthi Lila & Anjan Foundation, a nonprofit, voluntary organisation striving towards corporate social responsibility. Every year, an amount of Rs. One Crore is being spent on social service activities for the benefit of poor and needy people. The activities include health camps, eye camps, free distribution of medicines, free distribution of Spectacles, tree plantation, rehabilitation of people affected by natural calamities, encouraging rural sports, empowerment of women, providing drinking water during summer, educational scholarships to poor & merit students, etc.

Of late, Lead India 2020 programme is being implemented by the foundation, which is the brain child of Dr. APJ Abdul Kalam, ex-president of India. Through this programme, the students/youth are trained to become responsible citizens of their country with morals, ethics and specific goals and achievements. So far 48,526 students were trained from 142 schools/colleges in Guntur Dist. by the Foundation.

Anjaneyulu, is the MLA from Vinukonda Constituency, in Guntur Dist., A.P.

Anjaneyulu started Shivashakti Group Companies in 1996. The group manufactures and markets qualitative and high yielding Agri inputs like organic fertilisers, micronutrients, plant growth promoters, bio fertilisers, bio pesticides, etc. The group also markets Teak plants.

== Awards ==
The group companies under the leadership of Anjaneyulu, were conferred the following awards:

- Honoured with "Best Marketing Effort Award 2000–2001" from FAPCCI, Hyderabad.
- Honoured with "Best Industrial Productivity Award 2002–2003" from FAPCCI, Hyderabad.
- Honoured with "Best Marketing Performance Award 2003–2004" from FAPCCI, Hyderabad.
- Honoured with "Organization with Innovative HR Practices 2011–12" Award in 12th Asia Pacific HRM Congress on Sept. 6th 2012 at Taj, Bangalore.
- Honoured with "Best Marketing Company 2011–12" Award by FICCI, at "FICCI Food 360" on Nov. 5th 2012 in Hyderabad.
- Honoured with "Best Learning & Development Strategy" Award in India Human Capital Awards on 7 Dec. 2012 at Taj Deccan, Hyderabad
- Honoured with "Excellence in Training & Best HR Strategy in line with Business" Award in 7th Employer Branding Award on 7 Dec. 2012 at Taj Deccan, Hyderabad.
- Honoured with "TV5 – Business Leader Award 2012" - under the category "Agriculture and Food Processing", presented on 18 May 2013 at N Convention Centre, Hyderabad.
