= Veera (1994 film) =

1994 film by Suresh Krissna

- Theatrical release poster
- Directed by: Suresh Krissna
- Screenplay by: Panchu Arunachalam
- Based on: Allari Mogudu by P. Satyanand
- Produced by: Meena Panchu Arunachalam
- Starring: Rajinikanth; Meena; Roja
- Cinematography: P. S. Prakash
- Edited by: Ganesh–Kumar
- Music by: Ilaiyaraaja
- Production company: P. A. Art Productions
- Release date: 14 April 1994
- Running time: 164 minutes
- Country: India
- Language: Tamil

Veera (transl. Valour) (Note: Also the titular character.) is a 1994 Indian Tamil-language romantic comedy film directed by Suresh Krissna and written by Panchu Arunachalam. It is a remake of the Telugu film Allari Mogudu (1992) and stars Rajinikanth, Meena and Roja with Janagaraj, Senthil, Vadivukkarasi, J. Livingston, Mahesh Anand, Vinu Chakravarthy, Ajay Rathnam, Vivek and Charuhasan in supporting roles. The film is about a man who marries twice because of circumstances beyond his control and is forced to live a double life to cover his tracks.

Krissna initially refused to remake Allari Mogudu because he disliked it but agreed after Rajinikanth told him their next film after Annaamalai (1992) should be different to avoid comparisons. The screenplay of Veera was written to be substantially different from the original; it was tailored to Rajinikanth's style and had logic added to the scenario. Arunachalam, who made script changes, received sole screenwriting credit. The film was produced by Arunachalam's wife Meena, photographed by P. S. Prakash and edited by Ganesh–Kumar.

Veera was released on 14 April 1994 during the Puthandu holiday. The film received mixed reviews from critics and audiences were disappointed because they expected a film like Annaamalai. Despite this, ticket sales improved within a few weeks of its release and Veera became a commercial success, running for over 100 days in theatres.

== Plot ==
Muthuveerappan "Muthu", an idler from Karamadai, falls in love with Devayani alias Devi, the daughter of Carnatic musician Krishnamurthy Shastri. To lure her, Muthuveerappan pretends to learn music from Shastri. One day, Devi overhears Muthuveerappan discussing his plans to seduce her with his friends, and confronts him. Chastened, Muthuveerappan concentrates on his music and later wins over Devi. They marry in secret but before they can make this official, Rathnavelu, son of the village landlord, tries to rape Devi. Muthuveerappan saves her by subduing Rathnavelu. Enraged, the landlord insults Muthu's mother, tells her about a loan owed to him by Muthuveerappan's late father and threatens to evict her if the loan is not paid within a week. Muthuveerappan goes to Madras to earn money.

In Madras, Muthuveerappan tries to enter a music competition to win the prize money. He meets tabla player Ravikanth, who gives him the stage name "Veera". Both make repeated attempts to enter the competition but are unsuccessful. Muthuveerappan saves the competition promoter's owner Viswanathan's daughter Roopakala from Harichandran, a gangster. With Roopa's help, Muthuveerappan is able to perform at the competition with Ravikanth and wins the prize money. Muthuveerappan returns to Karamadai and repays the loan, clearing his mother's debt. He learns Devi's house had been destroyed by a flood; the bodies of Devi and her father were not found. With Devi presumed dead, Muthuveerappan's mother tells him to return to Madras so that he can start afresh.

After Muthuveerappan and his mother arrive in Madras, he gets a full-time job in the music industry and embraces the Veera identity. Viswanathan appoints him as the new company manager after firing the previous manager Chandran for selling pirated cassettes. Roopa, having fallen in love with Muthuveerappan, wants to marry him. Muthuveerappan initially refuses because he misses Devi but his mother persuades him to marry her. After her marriage, Roopa and Viswanathan go to the United States as the latter needs a heart surgery there. One day, at his recording studio, Muthuveerappan finds Devi alive and well. She survived the flood but was left with amnesia; her memory was restored when she heard Muthuveerappan singing on the radio, so she went to Madras in search of him. Muthuveerappan decides not to tell Devi about his marriage to Roopa.

After Roopa and Viswanathan return, Muthuveerappan tries to tell Roopa about Devi but decides not to after she tells him about how her friend, at Roopa's suggestion, murdered her lover for infidelity. Devi and Muthuveerappan go to a temple to formally marry on Devi's demands, and Ravikanth is tasked with preventing Roopa from going there but fails. Roopa arrives at the temple; Ravikanth helps Muthuveerappan to hide his marriage to Devi from Roopa and vice versa. When Roopa sees her husband leaving with Devi, Ravikanth lies that Muthu and Veera are different men. As a result, Muthuveerappan is forced to live a double life as Devi's husband Muthu and as Roopa's husband Veera.

Chandran, aware of Muthuveerappan's double life, tries to blackmail him but Muthuveerappan gives him an altered photograph showing two of him. Believing it is genuine, Chandran gives the photograph to Harichandran who sees through the fraud, commits a murder and frames Muthu as Veera's killer. After Muthuveerappan reveals the truth about his double life to his wives, they fight over him and refuse to share. The wives are kidnapped by Harichandran's men. Muthuveerappan subdues Harichandran and Chandran, who are arrested. Muthuveerappan's wives reconcile with him but not with each other. Muthuveerappan's mother persuades him to leave Madras and return to Karamadai. When he, his mother and Ravikanth enter Muthu's house, they find Devi, Roopa and Viswanathan already there. Devi and Roopa take a bag each from Muthuveerappan then flounce off in opposite directions.

== Cast ==
- Rajinikanth as Muthuveerappan
- Meena as Devayani alias Devi
- Roja as Roopakala alias Roopa
- Janagaraj as Viswanathan
- Senthil as Ravikanth
- Vadivukkarasi as Lakshmi
- J. Livingston as Chandran
- Mahesh Anand as Harichandran
- Vinu Chakravarthy as the village landlord
- Ajay Rathnam as Rathnavelu
- Vivek as Chinnamani
- Y. G. Mahendran as Kesavan
- Charan Raj as Inspector Sathyamurthy (guest appearance)
- Charuhasan as Krishnamurthy Shastri (uncredited)

== Production ==
=== Development ===
After Rajinikanth saw the Telugu film Allari Mogudu (1992) with the director Suresh Krissna and producer-screenwriter Panchu Arunachalam, he expressed his desire to remake it in Tamil as their next collaboration. Krissna objected to this idea as he did not like the film and found it unsuitable for him. Rajinikanth said he wanted to make a "two-wife" comedy, but Krissna noticed Allari Mogudu lacks the values associated with typical Rajinikanth films and felt fans would not accept his character being bigamous. Rajinikanth said changes could be made to suit the local milieu. Krissna wanted to begin work on Baashha but Rajinikanth said if their next film was heavy on action like their previous film Annaamalai (1992), "we will get caught. Bring the hopes down, bring the level down and then take it up again." Krissna agreed but avoided making a shot-for-shot remake of Allari Mogudu.

Rajinikanth and Krissna went to the Taj Banjara hotel in Hyderabad to discuss the plot. They prepared a fresh outline in ten days; Krissna tailored the story to Rajinikanth's style and added logic to the scenario. He submitted the final draft to Arunachalam, who liked it and suggested plot changes. According to Krissna, the remake has more "emotional profundity" than the Telugu original, and it was established that the protagonist Muthuveerappan is a pious person who married twice due to circumstances beyond his control. He differentiated Muthuveerappan from the original's protagonist, saying although circumstances drive him to another woman (Roopa), Muthu's feelings for his first wife Devi are sincere, he has not forgotten her and is forced by his mother into marrying Roopa.

Whereas in Allari Mogudu the second wife's desire for the protagonist is sexual, that aspect in Veera was made secondary. According to Krissna, "we polished the screenplay over and over again till it gathered sheen. Eventually, but for the basic plot, Veera emerged as a near-new product." Veera was produced by Arunachalam's wife Meena under their banner P. A. Art Productions. Arunachalam received sole credit for the screenplay while P. Satyanand, the writer of Allari Mogudu, received credit for the original story. Cinematography was handled by P. S. Prakash, editing by the duo Ganesh–Kumar, and art direction was done by Magie. The action choreography was handled by Raju, and dance sequences were choreographed by Raghuram. Meena was chosen to play Devi, reprising her role from Allari Mogudu, and Ramya Krishnan was offered to reprise her role as well. She declined, citing scheduling conflicts, and Roja was cast as Roopa instead. Bollywood actor Mahesh Anand portrayed the antagonist Harichandran in his first Tamil film.

=== Filming ===
Veera was formally launched with a puja at the Lord Ganapathi temple within AVM Studios, although principal photography began at Rajahmundry. A four-day filming schedule with 40 background dancers was planned for the song "Maadethile Kanni" at Talakona. After the first day's filming, Krissna was unhappy because the location did not provide him with the expected quality. The crew returned to Madras and filmed the song at Raghavendra Kalyana Mandapam and at a house at AVM Studios. The song "Konji Konji" was filmed at Narada Gana Sabha, Madras. Because the song that depicts Muthuveerappan, as Veera, performing on stage "didn't lend itself to anything vibrant", Krissna intercut it with scenes in which Roopa visualises Veera in various outfits and begins to find him attractive. According to Krissna, this was a chance to show Veera in a variety of costumes because he is only shown wearing a simple white shirt and black trousers until the song begins and would not change his clothing and appearance until much later in the film. Krissna decided to "let the audience get a glimpse of how [Veera] would look later on in the film" through this song.

The song "Malai Kovil Vaasalil" was filmed at the MRF Racing Track in Sriperumbudur. As it depicts Devi having formed the name "Muthu" in the Tamil script (முத்து) by arranging thousands of lamps, 20,000 lamps were made to glow simultaneously. Krissna decided to use chimney lamps that stopped the wind from extinguishing the lights. The song had to be filmed from above to emphasise the glowing lamps while Devi "should appear as a mere spot in the middle of gigantic lamps", so Prakash went to a tower that stood about 200 feet (61 m) away from the actual spot so the camera could zoom in and out for best results. Krissna described it as "one of the most strenuous and painstakingly shot sequences" in his career. Rajinikanth and Anand did not rehearse the fight sequence in which Muthuveerappan and Harichandran jump towards each other, then fall to the ground with their hands interlocked; they watched the stuntmen perform and followed their instructions. Rajinikanth performed all of his stunts without using a stunt double.

Magie's assistant Mani designed the film's large, multicoloured kolam that was 100 ft × 200 ft (30 m × 61 m); a rope was attached to a pulley, one side of which was attached to Mani's waist. He was made to hang horizontally from it, with his face and hands turned towards the floor; completing the task took him two days and two nights. A scene in which Muthuveerappan and Ravikanth (Senthil) attempt to fool Roopa at a temple was filmed at Hyderabad's Birla Mandir, which does not generally permit filming. Most of Rajinikanth's acting was improvised on set. For the scene in which Muthuveerappan trips on his dhoti while changing into formal clothing, there were no retakes. In the post-production phase, Meena's voice was dubbed by K. R. Anuradha and the introductory "Super Star" graphic title card from Annaamalai was re-used. The length of the final film is 4,406.34 metres (14,456.5 ft).

== Themes ==
Writer S. Rajanayagam compared Veera to another Rajinikanth film Panakkaran (1990) because both of them stress that "true wealth consists of good parents, wife, children and friends". Though the film is a remake of Allari Mogudu, many writers have compared Veera with Rettai Vaal Kuruvi (1987) and Micki & Maude (1984), both of which also have bigamy as their themes. According to writer Archanaa Sekar, in Tamil films women married to the same man show "an unusual display of sisterhood" and "female solidarity", citing Veera as an example because the two female leads are initially friends (despite being unaware that they are married to the same man), and once a conflict arises amongst them, "the friendship helps smooth things over, and the film ends with the two choosing to co-exist with the man".

== Soundtrack ==
The soundtrack of Veera was composed by Ilaiyaraaja, who also wrote lyrics along with Vaali and Panchu Arunachalam. It is the last Rajinikanth film for which Ilaiyaraaja composed music. The soundtrack album was released on the label Pyramid Music. During the filming schedule at Rajahmundry, Ilaiyaraaja had composed a duet and sent it to Krissna, who liked the song but felt it did not suit the situation. Rajinikanth and other crew members expressed similar views. On returning to Madras, Krissna told Ilaiyaraaja the duet's tune did not suit the situation; Ilaiyaraaja was angry with Krissna but a few hours later, he replaced the duet with other tunes. The audio launch was held at Raghavendra Kalyana Mandapam.

Many of the songs are set in Carnatic ragas such as "Konji Konji" in Dharmavati, "Malai Kovil Vaasalil" in Asaveri, "Pattu Poo Poo" in Chalanata, and "Thirumagal" in Lalitha. "Maadethile Kanni" is set in the Hindustani raga, Brindavani Sarang. Two versions of "Konji Konji" were recorded; one was sung by S. P. Balasubrahmanyam and the other by K. S. Chithra. Over 100,000 audio cassettes of Veera's soundtrack were sold on the release date.

Track listing
No.	Title	Lyrics	Singer(s)	Length
1.	"Aathile Annakili"	Panchu Arunachalam	Arunmozhi	1:11
2.	"Adi Pandalile"	Panchu Arunachalam	Mano	1:37
3.	"Konji Konji" (female)	Panchu Arunachalam	K. S. Chithra	1:16
4.	"Konji Konji" (male)	Panchu Arunachalam	S. P. Balasubrahmanyam	5:10
5.	"Maadethile Kanni"	Vaali	S. P. Balasubrahmanyam, Swarnalatha	4:24
6.	"Malai Kovil Vaasalil"	Vaali	Swarnalatha, Mano	4:36
7.	"Pattu Poo Poo"	Vaali	K. S. Chithra	4:25
8.	"Thirumagal"	Ilaiyaraaja	Arunmozhi	4:52
9.	"Vaadi Vethalai"	Vaali	Mano, K. S. Chithra	4:03
Total length:				31:34

== Release ==
Veera was released on 14 April 1994 during the Puthandu holiday. Two months after release, a delegation representing various women's organisations in Madras urged the Central Board of Film Certification to remove parts of the film that allegedly "portray, recognise and legitimise bigamy".

=== Critical reception ===
Veera received mixed critical reviews; audiences and fans of Rajinikanth were disappointed because they expected a film like Annaamalai and were discontent with the title character's lack of heroism. Malini Mannath of The Indian Express wrote, "Veera starts promisingly enough", praising Rajinikanth's comedy timing in the first half, but said the manner in which Muthuveerappan learns of Devi's presumed death is "not very convincingly told". She said, "The script takes a nosedive" with the return of Devi, "never to recover". Mannath added Rajinikanth's comedy in the second half feels forced and that "At this stage of his career [Rajinikanth] could have taken more meaningful roles" but concluded by praising the songs. K. Vijiyan of New Straits Times praised the film's action sequences, the performances of the female leads and the music by Ilaiyaraaja but said Harichandran has "little to do with the main story" and was included "just to satisfy Rajni's action-oriented fans". Vijiyan concluded the review by saying, "Veera has a bit of everything to satisfy all sections of the audience to provide a superb evening's entertainment". A writer for the magazine Manushi said, "The director has displayed much ingenuity in bringing the first supposedly dead 'wife' back to life, bringing the two wives together, etc. The final scenes were shoddy, ill-conceived and in bad taste." R. P. R. of Kalki gave the film a mixed review, criticising the screenplay and lack of originality, but lauded Ilaiyaraaja's music.

=== Box office ===
During the first few weeks of its release, Veera had a mediocre response at the box office because of comparisons with Annaamalai but after a few weeks, audiences increased and the film completed a 100-day run in theatres. Krissna attributed the film's success to its comedy and Rajinikanth's popularity after Annaamalai, which had "soared to unimaginable heights" while other commentators attributed its success to its music. According to journalist Sudhir Srinivasan, Veera is the first Tamil film to collect ₹1 crore (equivalent to ₹6.6 crore or US$680,000 in 2023) in the NSC (North Arcot, South Arcot and Chengalpattu) areas; historian G. Dhananjayan said it collected that much "in Chengalpettu alone".

== Legacy ==
Veera partially redeemed Rajinikanth's reputation following the commercial failure of his home production Valli (1993). Veera has been dubbed in Hindi and released under several titles, despite Allari Mogudu having been remade in Hindi as Saajan Chale Sasural (1996). Rajinikanth's English line "How is it?" (pronounced "Owwizzit?") became immensely popular, as did the response "Super" (pronounced "Soopar"). Producer Elred Kumar obtained permission to reuse the film's title; his production Veera was released in 2018.

== Bibliography ==
- Krissna, Suresh; Rangarajan, Malathi (2012). My Days with Baasha: The Rajnikanth Phenomenon. Westland Ltd. ISBN 978-93-8162-629-0.
- Rajanayagam, S. (2015). Popular Cinema and Politics in South India: The Films of MGR and Rajinikanth. Routledge. ISBN 978-1-317-58772-9.
- Ramachandran, Naman (2014) [2012]. Rajinikanth: The Definitive Biography. Penguin Books. ISBN 978-81-8475-796-5.
- Sundararaman (2007) [2005]. Raga Chintamani: A Guide to Carnatic Ragas Through Tamil Film Music (2nd ed.). Pichhamal Chintamani. OCLC 295034757.
