= Venkateshwarlu =

Venkateshwarlu or Venkateswarlu is a Telugu given name: Notable people with the name include:

- Avudari Venkateswarlu, Indian politician
- B. Venkateshwarlu (born 1973), Indian businessman, journalist, writer, and film director
- Ummareddy Venkateswarlu (born 1935), Indian politician
