= Gali Bhanu Prakash =

Indian politician

Member of Legislative Assembly Andhra Pradesh
- Incumbent
- Assumed office 2024
- Preceded by: R. K. Roja
- Constituency: Nagari

Personal details
- Born: 20-06-1976
- Party: Telugu Desam Party

Gali Bhanu Prakash (born 20 June 1976) is an Indian politician from Andhra Pradesh. He is an MLA from Nagari Assembly constituency in Chittoor district. He represents Telugu Desam Party. He won the 2024 Andhra Pradesh Legislative Assembly election where TDP had an alliance with BJP and Jana Sena Party.

== Early life and education ==
Prakash is from Nagari. His late father Gali Muddu Krishnam Naidu was a former minister, six times MLA and an MLC. He completed his post graduation in 2000 at University of Bridgeport, Connecticut, US. Earlier, he did his graduation in 1997 at MJ College which is affiliated with Osmania University, Hyderabad. He completed his Intermediate in 1993 at Vikas Junior College, Guntur after his schooling at Hyderabad Public School. He declared assets worth Rs.23.9 crore in his affidavit to the Election Commission of India in 2024.

== Political career ==
Prakash won the 2024 Andhra Pradesh Legislative Assembly election from Nagari Assembly constituency representing Telugu Desam Party. He polled 107,797 votes and defeated his nearest rival, R. K. Roja, the tourism minister in the incumbent YSR Congress Party government, by a margin of 45,004 votes. He entered politics after his father died in 2018. He contested the 2019 Andhra Pradesh Legislative Assembly election but lost by a narrow margin of 2,708 votes to Roja.
