= Bolla Brahma Naidu =

Indian politician

Member of Legislative Assembly Andhra Pradesh
- In office 2019–2024
- Preceded by: G. V. Anjaneyulu
- Succeeded by: G. V. Anjaneyulu
- Constituency: Vinukonda

Personal details
- Born: 1957 (age 68–69) Velpur Village, Savalyapuram Mandal, Palnadu district, Andhra Pradesh
- Party: YSR Congress Party (2011-present)
- Other political affiliations: Praja Rajyam Party (2008-2011)
- Parents: Bolla Hanumayya (father); Bolla Manikyamma (mother)
- Profession: Politician; Farmer

Bolla Brahmanaidu is an Indian politician, who currently represents Vinukonda Assembly constituency in the Andhra Pradesh Legislative Assembly.

== Political career ==
Bolla Brahmanaidu came from a farming family and founded Tirumala Dairy in 2004, Tirumala Engineering College and Tirumala Oxford Education Society. He entered politics in 2009 and contested the 2009 assembly elections from the Praja Rajyam Party and lost.

After Bolla Brahmanaidu's Praja Rajyam Party merged with the Congress, he joined the YSR Congress Party and contested the 2014 assembly elections from Pedakurapadu constituency and lost. He contested the 2019 elections from Vinukonda constituency and was elected to the assembly for the first time.
