= Peddannayya =

1997 Indian film by Sarath

- Theatrical release poster
- Directed by: Sarath
- Written by: Paruchuri Brothers (story / dialogues)
- Screenplay by: Sarath
- Produced by: Nandamuri Ramakrishna
- Starring: Nandamuri Balakrishna; Roja; Indraja
- Cinematography: Nandamuri Mohana Krishna
- Edited by: Kotagiri Venkateswara Rao
- Music by: Koti
- Production company: Ramakrishna Horticultural Cine Studios
- Release date: 10 January 1997
- Running time: 146 minutes
- Country: India
- Language: Telugu

Peddannayya (transl. Big Brother) is a 1997 Telugu-language drama film directed by Sarath and produced by Nandamuri Ramakrishna under Ramakrishna Horticultural Cine Studios. It stars Nandamuri Balakrishna, Roja and Indraja, with music composed by Koti. The film was recorded as a blockbuster at the box office.

== Plot ==
The film begins with Ramakrishna Prasad, a supreme authority of the terrain who holds a family feud with malevolent Bhaskar Rayudu, a big gun. The two used to be besties in the past. Ramakrishna is paterfamilias to his conscientious joint family. He only cares for his three cousins, Sai Prasad, Durga Prasad, & Bhavani Prasad, and their mother. Plus, they, too, esteem him as a deity. Seeta Mahalakshmi is a spirited woman who has patiently waited to knit Ramakrishna for 15 years. Since he pledged to be unmarried until his siblings settled, even she swears not to burn until he ties the knot. Besides, Bhavani is a cheerful, naughty medico who squabbles with his colleague Sravani.

Apart from this, Durga loves vainglory woman Neelaveni, the daughter of Bhaskar Rayudu's sidekick Advocate Chenchuramaiah. So, they collude by locking the two birds to create a rift in the family, which fails because of their idealized bondage. In the interim, Bhaskar Rayudu scammed a government project by constructing an inferiority structure in which Durga is also involved. Being conscious of it, Ramakrishna upbraids his brother, gets him to resign, and pays Bhaskar Rayudu back the looted amount. Meanwhile, Bhavani endears Sravani despite learning she is grown up at a prostitute's house who is going to be a scapegoat soon. As it happens, he must espouse her immediately to guard against evils without the knowledge of his elder brother. Utilizing it, Chenchuramaiah sets fire to the family. Though Ramakrishna appreciates & aids Bhavani's deed, he backs it because of the remaining refusal. Presently, Bhavani quits and shelters at their farmhouse.

After a while, the brutal snares Sai & Durga build a factory where Bhavani resides. Ramakrishna hinders it, which leads to the splitting of the property. Accordingly, Ramakrishna keeps the maximum share for the safety of his brothers. Hither, Sai & Durga are blind to gaze at his intention and vilify him, but he thresholds with patience. Parallelly, Bhaskar Rayudu allows shares to the public in the factory and accumulates ₹10,000,000 (US$100,000), and Sai consigned to deposit the amount. Amidst Bhaskar, Rayudu ruses by a steal and incriminates Bhavani. Hence, Ramakrishna repays the amount by selling his brothers' shares. It begrudges Sai & Durga to accuse him, also resisting his entrance into the house when their mother rebukes, proclaims the eminence of Ramakrishna, and spins rearward.

Once, Ramakrishna & Seeta are sweet lovers who will espouse in a little while. At that time, Bhaskar Rayudu's brother Ravindra betrayed Rama Krishna's sister Parvati, which led to her suicide. Hence, the infuriated Ramakrishna slaughters Ravindra in that attack. Ramakrishna's uncle dies, entrusting his infants to him. Thus, Ramakrishna affirmed to make them worthy. Listening to it, the family regrets and pleads for pardon from their elder brother. Further, they proceed to retrieve Bhavani & Sravani when he keeps a condition that Ramakrishna should unite with Seeta, to which he agrees. At that time, Bhaskar Rayudu & Chenchuramaiah cabal, by garroting Seeta, posed it as a suicide and indicted Ramakrishna. Currently, Ramakrishna knots the wedding chain to Seeta's blank body to fulfill her vow. During her funeral, the police apprehend Ramakrishna. Side by side, Bhaskar Rayudu grounds by backstabbing Chenchuramaiah & Neelaveni, and therein was a close call. Before dying, Chenchuramaiah affirms the actuality with conscience-stricken when Bhaskar Rayudu onslaughts on them. At last, Ramakrishna & Bhavani cease the baddies. Finally, the movie ends with gravely wounded Ramakrishna taking self-immolation with Seeta.

== Cast ==
- Nandamuri Balakrishna as Rama Krishna Prasad & Bhavani Prasad (Dual role)
- Roja as Sita Mahalakshmi (Voice Dubbed by Roja Ramani)
- Indraja as Shravani (Voice Dubbed by Shilpa)
- Subhashri as Neelaveni
- Kota Srinivasa Rao as Chenchuramaiah
- Charanraj as Bhaskar Rayudu
- Srihari as Bhaskar Rayudu's son
- Brahmanandam as Principal
- Sudhakar as Bhaskar Rayudu's brother-in-law
- Vijaya Rangaraju as Bombula Bal Reddy
- Chalapathi Rao
- M.Balayya as Rama Krishna's Father/Babai
- Achyuth as Sai Prasad
- Raj Kumar as Durga Prasad
- Raja Ravindra as Ravindra
- Rajiv Kanakala
- Prasad Babu as Police Inspector
- Ananth Babu as Bhavani Prasad's friend
- Annapoorna as Rama Krishna Prasad's mother/pinni
- Lathasri as Sulochana
- Rajitha
- Krishnaveni
- Aalapati Lakshmi as Bhaskar Rayudu's wife

== Soundtrack ==
Peddannayya

Film score by Koti
- Released: 1996
- Genre: Soundtrack
- Length: 27:53
- Label: Shiva Musicals
- Producer: Koti

Koti chronology
| Intlo Illalu Vantintlo Priyuralu (1997) | Peddannayya (1996) | Muddula Mogudu (1997) |

The music for the film was composed by Koti and released on Shiva Musicals Company.

| No. | Title | Lyrics | Singer(s) | Length |
|---|---|---|---|---|
| 1. | "O Mustafa" | Veturi | S. P. Balasubrahmanyam, Chitra | 5:03 |
| 2. | "Nee Andamantha" | Veturi | S. P. Balasubrahmanyam, Chitra | 5:08 |
| 3. | "Chakkilaala Chukka" | Veturi | S. P. Balasubrahmanyam, Chitra | 4:23 |
| 4. | "Kutumbam Annagari" | C. Narayana Reddy | S. P. Balasubrahmanyam, Chitra | 4:33 |
| 5. | "Kalalo Kalyanamala" | Veturi | S. P. Balasubrahmanyam, Chitra | 4:32 |
| 6. | "Chikkindi Chemanthi" | Bhuvanachandra | S. P. Balasubrahmanyam, Chitra | 4:03 |
| Total length: | | | | 27:53 |

== Reception ==
The film was reviewed by Zamin Ryot. A critic from Andhra Today wrote that "A movie full of sentiments of upholding traditional extended family structure and has great appeal for the masses. Almost in imitation of his father and movie legend NTR, Balakrishna indulges in a lot of platitudes and histrionics".
