= Gangineni Venkateswara Rao =

Indian politician

Gangineni Venkateswara Rao was elected as the Member of the Legislative Assembly for Vinukonda constituency in Andhra Pradesh, India, in 1983 and 1985. He represented the Telugu Desam Party on the first occasion and the Communist Party of India on the second.
