= Raasaiyya =

- Poster
- Directed by: R. Kannan
- Written by: R. Selvaraj
- Produced by: T. Siva
- Starring: Prabhu Deva; Roja
- Cinematography: R. Rajarathnam
- Edited by: Ashok Mehtha
- Music by: Ilaiyaraaja
- Production company: Amma Creations
- Release date: 24 August 1995
- Running time: 130 minutes
- Country: India
- Language: Tamil

Raasaiyya is a 1995 Indian Tamil-language romance film written by R. Selvaraj which is the directorial debut of his younger brother R. Kannan, and produced by T. Siva. The film stars Prabhu Deva and Roja. It revolves around the life struggle and love life of the title character. The film was released on 24 August 1995, and failed at the box office.

== Plot ==
Raasaiyya lives with his grandfather, Rathnavel, a kind-hearted and honest man in a small town in rural Southern India. Rathnavel is very easy-going and permits Raasaiyya to indulge in many precocious activities. When young and beautiful Anitha comes to stay for a few days with Rathnavel, both Raasaiyya and she fall in love with each other and would like to marry. But Raasaiyya is unable to assert himself, and Anitha's marriage is arranged with a NRI groom settled in the United States. Rathnavel would like to present a decent dowry for Anitha, which includes a priceless diamond necklace. Unable to bear his separation from his sweetheart, Rasaiya decides to tell Rathnavel about this, but before he could do so, he finds out that his biological mother, Pandiamma, is still alive, but will not have anything to do with him. Watch what happens when Raasaiyya finally meets her and finds out the secret why she abandoned him in his childhood.

== Cast ==
- Prabhu Deva as Raasaiyya
- Roja as Anitha
- Vijayakumar as Rathnavel
- Radhika as Madhavi
- M. N. Nambiar as Swamy
- Vadivelu as Kili
- Vinu Chakravarthy as Ramasamy
- Thyagu as Ramasamy's son
- Thalaivasal Vijay as Kaalai
- Hemanth Ravan as Groom
- R. Sundarrajan as Kili's cousin
- Mannangatti Subramaniam as Villager
- Nair Raman as Villager
- R. N. K. Prasad as Groom's father
- Gandhimathi as Servant
- Radhabhai as Groom's mother
- Kovai Senthil as Butcher
- King Kong as villager
- Krishnamoorthy as villager (uncredited)
- Ajay Rathnam as man in Raasaiyya's dream (uncredited)

== Production ==
Rasaiyya marked the directorial debut of R. Kannan, younger brother of screenwriter R. Selvaraj who wrote the story of this film. The film's title was named after Ilaiyaraaja's real name. After listening to the script by Selvaraj, Ilaiyaraaja objected to Kannan directing and instead suggested Bharathiraja, but producer T. Siva noted that Kannan refused to budge.

== Soundtrack ==
The music was composed by Ilaiyaraaja, with lyrics by Vaali. Ilaiyaraaja's daughter Bhavatharini made her solo singing debut with this film.

Song	Singers	Length
"Dindukallu"	S. P. Balasubrahmanyam, Ilaiyaraaja, Arunmozhi, Devie Neithiyar	5:22
"Kadhal Vaanile"	S. P. Balasubrahmanyam, Preeti Uttamsingh	5:41
"Karuvattu"	K. S. Chithra, Mano	5:38
"Masthana Masthana"	Bhavatharini, Arunmozhi, S. N. Surendar	5:53
"Paatu Ellam"	Mano	6:04
"Unna Ninaichu"	Mano, K. S. Chithra	5:13

== Reception ==
K. Vijiyan of New Straits Times called the story ordinary, and said the film was strictly for fans of Prabhu Deva and Roja. R. P. R. of Kalki wrote that sentiment, heroism, dance and songs, comedy and other spices are all there, but everything in its separate route; while mixing all together, the screenwriter heavily messed up, so after the break it feels like one person can sit casually on the three chairs and watch it. The Hindu praised the dance choreography, performances of Vijayakumar and Vadivelu, Ilaiyaraaja's music and Rajarathnam's cinematography. The film became a box-office failure.
