= Yallamanda Rao Veerapaneni =

Indian politician

Yallamanda Rao Veerapaneni was elected as the Member of the Legislative Assembly for Vinukonda constituency in Andhra Pradesh, India, in 1994 and 1999. They represented the Telugu Desam Party on the second occasion, having been an independent candidate on the first.
