= Gadibidi Ganda =

1993 film by V. S. Reddy

- DVD cover
- Directed by: V. S. Reddy
- Produced by: K. Krishna Mohana Rao
- Starring: Ravichandran; Ramya Krishna; Roja Selvamani
- Cinematography: Jayaram
- Edited by: Kotagiri Venkateswara Rao
- Music by: Hamsalekha
- Release date: 1993
- Running time: 153 minutes
- Country: India
- Language: Kannada

Gadibidi Ganda is a 1993 Indian Kannada-language romantic comedy film directed by V. S. Reddy. The film stars Ravichandran, Ramya Krishnan and Roja (in her Kannada debut), amongst others. Music and lyrics was composed by Hamsalekha. It is a remake of the Telugu film Allari Mogudu.

== Plot ==
Gopal is a village boy with a melodious voice who comes to the city in search of a job. Mohana a young and vibrant girl helps him to get a break in a good music company. In this process Mohana falls in love with him and forces him to marry her. On the other hand, Gopal returns to his village and marries his childhood love Nilambari. How would he juggle between both his wives makes the comedy climax of the story.

== Cast ==
- Ravichandran as Gopal
- Ramya Krishna as Mohana
- Roja as Neelambari
- Nagesh
- Jaggesh as Sathya, Gopal's friend
- Doddanna as Mohana's father
- Rami Reddy
- J V Somayajulu as Neelambari's father
- Annapoorna

== Songs ==
Soundtrack was composed by Hamsalekha. The soundtrack was released under Akash Audio.

Title	Singer(s)
"Pancharangi Putta"	S. P. Balasubrahmanyam, K. S. Chithra
"Bidde Bidde"	S. P. Balasubrahmanyam, K. S. Chithra
"Muddadendide Mallige"	S. P. Balasubrahmanyam, K. S. Chithra
"Neenu Neene"	S. P. Balasubrahmanyam
"Bum Chik Bum"	K. S. Chithra
"Gadibidi Ganda Neenu"	S. P. Balasubrahmanyam, K. S. Chithra
