= Vinukonda Assembly constituency =

Constituency of the Andhra Pradesh Legislative Assembly, India

Coordinates: 16.06°N 79.74°E

Vinukonda
- Constituency No. 99 for the Andhra Pradesh Legislative Assembly
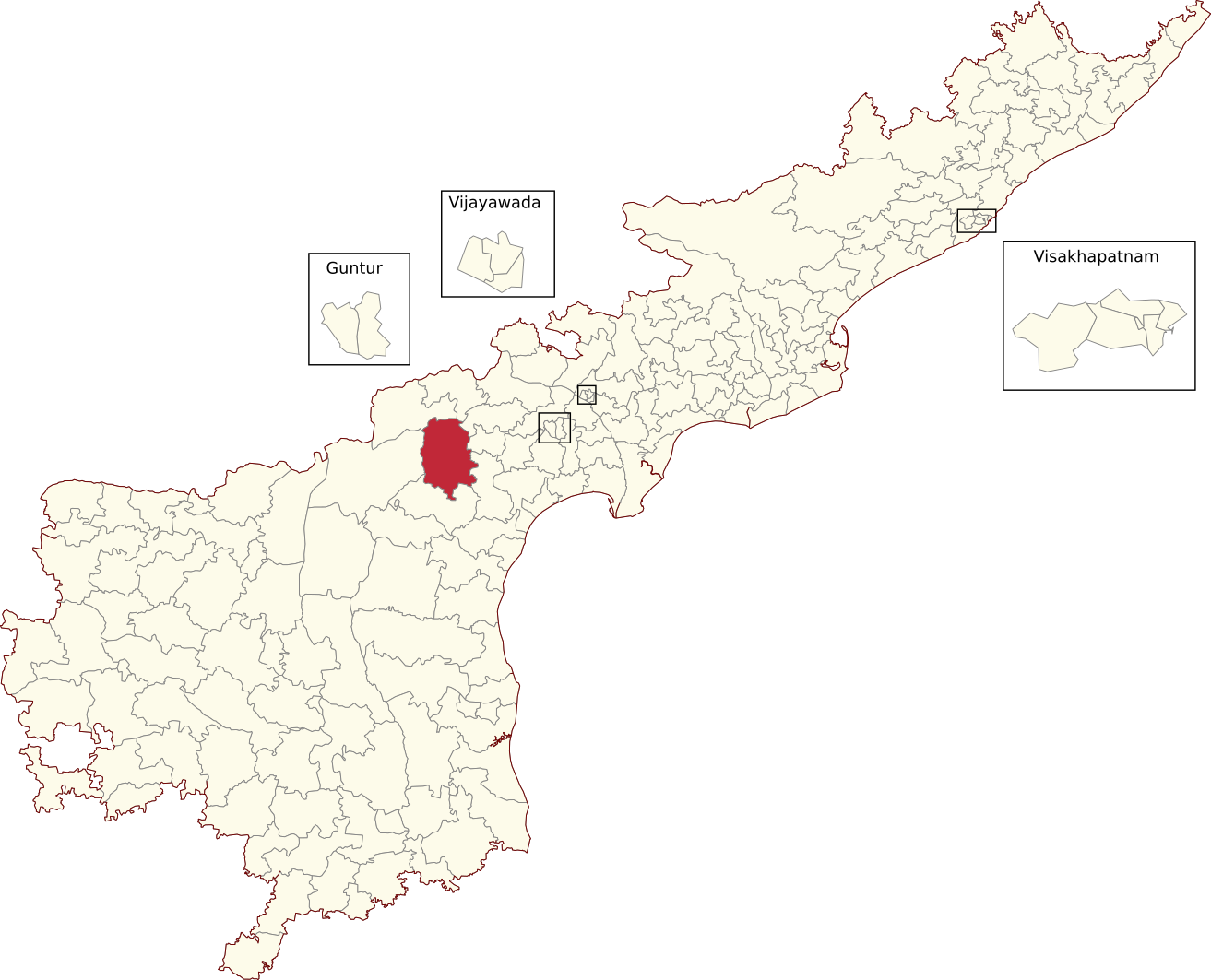
- Location of Vinukonda Assembly constituency within Andhra Pradesh

Constituency details
- Country: India
- Region: South India
- State: Andhra Pradesh
- District: Palnadu
- Lok Sabha constituency: Narasaraopet
- Established: 1951
- Total electors: 260,516
- Reservation: None

Member of Legislative Assembly
- 16th Andhra Pradesh Legislative Assembly
- Incumbent G. V. Anjaneyulu
- Party: TDP
- Alliance: NDA
- Elected year: 2024

Vinukonda Assembly constituency is a constituency in Palnadu district of Andhra Pradesh that elects representatives to the Andhra Pradesh Legislative Assembly in India. It is one of the seven assembly segments of Narasaraopet Lok Sabha constituency.

G. V. Anjaneyulu is the current MLA of the constituency, having won the 2024 Andhra Pradesh Legislative Assembly election from Telugu Desam Party. As of 2024, there are a total of 260,516 electors in the constituency. The constituency was established in 1951, as per the Delimitation Orders (1951).

== Mandals ==
Mandals
Ipur

Nuzendla
Savalyapuram
Bollapalle

== Members of the Legislative Assembly ==
Year	Member	Political party
1952	Pulapula Venkata Sivaiah	Communist Party of India
1955	Nalabolu Govindarajulu	Indian National Congress
1962	Pulapula Venkata Sivaiah	Communist Party of India
1967	Bhavanam Jayaprada	Indian National Congress
1972	Bhavanam Jayaprada	Indian National Congress
1978	Avudari Venkateswarlu	Independent
1983	Gangineni Venkateswara Rao	Independent
1985	Gangineni Venkateswara Rao	Communist Party of India
1989	Nannapaneni Rajakumari	Indian National Congress
1994	Veerapaneni Yallamanda Rao	Independent
1999	Veerapaneni Yallamanda Rao	Telugu Desam Party
2004	Makkena Mallikarjuna Rao	Indian National Congress
2009	G. V. Anjaneyulu	Telugu Desam Party
2014	G. V. Anjaneyulu	Telugu Desam Party
2019	Bolla Brahma Naidu	YSR Congress Party
2024	G. V. Anjaneyulu	Telugu Desam Party

== Election results ==
=== 1952 ===
1952 Madras State Legislative Assembly election: Vinukonda
Party	Candidate	Votes	%	±%
CPI	Pulupula Venkatasivaiah	15,354	47.86%	
Independent	Paladugu Nagaiah Chowdhary	4,997	15.58%	
INC	Guntur Anantharamakotaiah	4,332	13.50%	13.50%
KLP	Vajrala Venkatareddi	3,659	11.41%	
KMPP	Paladugu Adinarayana	1,946	6.07%	
Independent	Devarakonda Hanumantha Rao	1,791	5.58%	
Margin of victory		10,357	32.29%	
Turnout		32,079	49.21%	
Registered electors		65,185		
CPI win (new seat)				

=== 1955 ===
1955 Andhra State Legislative Assembly election: Vinukonda
Party	Candidate	Votes	%	±%
INC	Nalabolu Govindrajulu	20,525	51.49%	
CPI	Pulapula Venkatasivaiah	19,336	48.51%	
Margin of victory		1,189	2.98%	
Turnout		39,861	55.56%	
Registered electors		71,749		
INC gain from CPI		Swing		

=== 1962 ===
1962 Andhra Pradesh Legislative Assembly election: Vinukonda
Party	Candidate	Votes	%	±%
CPI	Pulapula Venkatasivaiah	17,051	37.69%	
INC	Bhavanam Jayaprada	12,987	28.71%	
Margin of victory		4,064	8.98%	
Turnout		47,293	58.34%	
Registered electors		81,069		
CPI gain from INC		Swing		

=== 1967 ===
1967 Andhra Pradesh Legislative Assembly election: Vinukonda
Party	Candidate	Votes	%	±%
INC	Bhavanam Jayaprada	27,975	50.23%	
SWA	Avudari Venkateswarlu	17,748	31.87%	
Margin of victory		10,227	18.36%	
Turnout		58,104	68.05%	
Registered electors		85,381		
INC gain from CPI		Swing		

=== 1972 ===
1972 Andhra Pradesh Legislative Assembly election: Vinukonda
Party	Candidate	Votes	%	±%
INC	Bhavanam Jayaprada	23,968	44.74%	
CPI	Pulapula Venkatasivaiah	18,192	33.96%	
Margin of victory		5,776	10.78%	
Turnout		54,904	56.46%	
Registered electors		97,250		
INC hold		Swing		

=== 1978 ===
1978 Andhra Pradesh Legislative Assembly election: Vinukonda
Party	Candidate	Votes	%	±%
Independent	Avudari Venkateswarlu	21,781	29.97%	
Independent	Gangineni Venkateswara Rao	19,762	27.19%	
Margin of victory		2,019	2.78%	
Turnout		74,483	66.92%	
Registered electors		111,306		
Independent gain from INC		Swing		

=== 1983 ===
1983 Andhra Pradesh Legislative Assembly election: Vinukonda
Party	Candidate	Votes	%	±%
Independent	Gangineni Venkateswara Rao	27,754	32.79%	
INC	Avudari Venkateswarlu	25,339	32.26%	
Margin of victory		415	0.53%	
Turnout		80,187	66.66%	
Registered electors		120,301		
Independent hold		Swing		

=== 1985 ===
1985 Andhra Pradesh Legislative Assembly election: Vinukonda
Party	Candidate	Votes	%	±%
CPI	Gangineni Venkateswara Rao	46,994	55.13%	
INC	Venkata Narayana Rao Chandra	35,118	41.20%	
Margin of victory		11,876	13.93%	
Turnout		86,394	67.30%	
Registered electors		108,651		
CPI gain from TDP		Swing		

=== 1989 ===
1989 Andhra Pradesh Legislative Assembly election: Vinukonda
Party	Candidate	Votes	%	±%
INC	Nannapaneni Rajakumari	47,431	44.00%	
Independent	Yallamanda Rao Veerapaneni	46,301	42.95%	
Margin of victory		1,130	1.05%	
Turnout		112,277	66.83%	
Registered electors		168,005		
INC hold		Swing		

=== 1994 ===
1994 Andhra Pradesh Legislative Assembly election: Vinukonda
Party	Candidate	Votes	%	±%
Independent	Yallamanda Rao Veerapaneni	57,660	48.91%	
INC	Nannapaneni Rajakumari	54,356	46.10%	
Margin of victory		3,304	2.80%	
Turnout		120,273	68.23%	
Registered electors		176,286		
Independent gain from INC		Swing		

=== 1999 ===
1999 Andhra Pradesh Legislative Assembly election: Vinukonda
Party	Candidate	Votes	%	±%
TDP	Yallamanda Rao Veerapaneni	61,939	48.54%	
INC	Makkena Mallikarjuna Rao	61,098	47.88%	
Margin of victory		841	0.66%	
Turnout		131,493	68.57%	
Registered electors		191,760		
TDP gain from Independent		Swing		

=== 2004 ===
2004 Andhra Pradesh Legislative Assembly election: Vinukonda
Party	Candidate	Votes	%	±%
INC	Makkena Mallikarjuna Rao	71,979	51.40	+3.52
TDP	Gonuguntla Leelavathi	64,230	45.86	−3.68
Majority		7,749	5.54	
Turnout		140,044	72.51	+5.96
Registered electors		193,150		
INC gain from TDP		Swing		

=== 2009 ===
2009 Andhra Pradesh Legislative Assembly election: Vinukonda
Party	Candidate	Votes	%	±%
TDP	Gonuguntla Venkata Seeta Rama Anjaneyulu	89,961	51.90	+6.04
INC	Chebrolu Narendra Nath	65,858	37.99	−13.41
PRP	Bolla Brahma Naidu	11,159	6.44	
Majority		24,103	13.91	
Turnout		173,342	81.42	+8.91
Registered electors		212,950		
TDP gain from INC		Swing		

=== 2014 ===
2014 Andhra Pradesh Legislative Assembly election: Vinukonda
Party	Candidate	Votes	%	±%
TDP	Gonuguntla Venkata Seeta Rama Anjaneyulu	104,321	52.77	
YSRCP	Dr.Nannapaneni Sudha	82,914	41.94	
Majority		21,407	10.83	
Turnout		197,689	85.91	+4.49
Registered electors		230,210		
TDP hold		Swing		

=== 2019 ===
2019 Andhra Pradesh Legislative Assembly election: Vinukonda
Party	Candidate	Votes	%	±%
YSRCP	Bolla Brahma Naidu	120,703	54.44	
TDP	Gonuguntla Venkata Seeta Rama Anjaneyulu	92,075	41.52	−11.61
Majority		28,628	12.91	
Turnout		2,23,859	88.89	
Registered electors		251,847		
YSRCP gain from TDP		Swing		

=== 2024 ===
2024 Andhra Pradesh Legislative Assembly election: Vinukonda
Party	Candidate	Votes	%	±%
TDP	Gonuguntla Venkata Seeta Rama Anjaneyulu	131,438	55.06	▲13.54
YSRCP	Bolla Brahma Naidu	101,171	42.38	▼12.06
INC	Chenna Srinivas Rao	1,902	0.8	
Majority		30,267	12.68	
Turnout		235,995	89.22	
Registered electors		260,516		
TDP gain from YSRCP		Swing		

== See also ==
- List of constituencies of Andhra Pradesh Legislative Assembly
