= Allari Mogudu =

1992 film by K. Raghavendra Rao

- DVD cover
- Directed by: K. Raghavendra Rao
- Produced by: K. Krishna Mohan Rao
- Starring: Mohan Babu; Meena; Ramya Krishna
- Music by: M. M. Keeravani
- Production company: R K Associates
- Release date: 14 February 1992
- Country: India
- Language: Telugu

Allari Mogudu (transl. Naughty husband) is a 1992 Indian Telugu-language romantic comedy film directed by K. Raghavendra Rao and produced by K. Krishna Mohan Rao under R K Associates. The film stars Mohan Babu, Meena and Ramya Krishna. It was released on 14 February 1992. The film was remade in Kannada as Gadibidi Ganda (1993), in Tamil as Veera (1994), in Hindi as Saajan Chale Sasural (1996). The 2015 film Mama Manchu Alludu Kanchu serves as a sequel to Allari Mogudu.

== Plot ==
Gopal (Mohan Babu) comes to the city from his village for a song contest. He meets Satyam (Brahmanandam) in the city and they both work hard for the song contest. Gopal tells Satyam about how he fell in love with Neelambari (Meena) and how he got her to love him. Neelambari is the daughter of a song teacher in his village. He came to this contest so he could win the money and pay off the loan his mother had to the village leader. They both work together and end up winning the song contest. Gopal then goes back to his village with joy and finds out a flood had come and Neelu's house had been destroyed, it was reported that her father and her body had not been found. Gopal thinks that Neelu is dead, and is very sad. He then goes and gives the money to the village leader, paying off his mother's debt. He afterwards moves to the city so that they can find a job and so that Gopal can forget about Neela. When they reach the city Gopal finds out that his song was a big hit. Therefore, he had become very popular. The holder of the song contest (Satyanarayana) calls on Gopal to come work for him. Gopal does not want to, but Satyam persuades him. He then works for Satyanarayana and his daughter falls in love with Gopal. Gopal who is still in love with Neelu refused to marry Satyanarayana's daughter Mohana (Ramya Krishna). Satyam says Neelambari won't come back so it's better to marry Mohana. Therefore, he marries Mohana.

Soon after the marriage she goes to the US for her father to have surgery after he suddenly suffers a heart attack. Neelambari was in fact alive but has amnesia. Gopal's songs are playing on the radio and Neelambari happens to hear it and she remembers again. She promptly gets on the bus to the city from a village where she was helping the fisherman who saved her life. She meets Gopal at the recording studio. He is surprised and overjoyed but doesn't tell her about his marriage to Mohana. Neelambari is then adamant to get married soon, so they both get married. He then juggles both of his lives (as Gopal, Mohana's husband and as Krishna, Neelu's husband). He nearly gets caught when both Mohana and Gopal with Neelu go to the saree shop and bump into each other. So to prove that the husbands are two different people, he takes photos and photoshops it to show two of him shaking hands. They then all believe Gopal and Krishna are different people. A thief who Gopal had caught and handed over to the police takes revenge by kidnapping his wives. The thief also knows that both are one person, and when he comes to save them it is revealed that both are one person. After he saves them both he finds out that both his wives are pregnant. They both forgive Gopal and the film ends on a happy note.

== Cast ==
- Mohan Babu as Gopal / Krishna
- Meena as Neelambari (Voice dubbed by Roja Ramani)
- Ramya Krishna as Mohana (Voice dubbed by Saritha)
- Kaikala Satyanarayana
- Brahmanandam as Satyam
- Costume Krishna
- Nagesh as Musical Genius "Dakshina Bharatha Thoothukudi Carnatic Sangeetha Samrat" Sivasamba Deekshutulu
- J. V. Somayajulu
- Prasad Babu
- Rami Reddy
- Annapoorna

== Production ==
The first shot of the film was directed by Chiranjeevi.

== Soundtrack ==
The soundtrack was composed by M. M. Keeravani.

Track listing
No.	Title	Lyrics	Singer(s)	Length
1.	"Abba Nanuganna"	Bhuvanachandra	S. P. Balasubrahmanyam, K. S. Chithra	4:20
2.	"Naa Paata Panchamrutham"	Sirivennela Seetharama Sastry	S. P. Balasubrahmanyam	4:48
3.	"Bamchiki Bam Bam"	Sirivennela Seetharama Sastry	K. S. Chithra	4:32
4.	"Neelimabbu Nuragalo"	M. M. Keeravani	S. P. Balasubrahmanyam, K. S. Chithra	4:04
5.	"Muddimmandi"	Sirivennela Seetharama Sastry	S. P. Balasubrahmanyam, K. S. Chithra	3:29
6.	"Repalle Malli Murali Vinnadi"	Sirivennela Seetharama Sastry	S. P. Balasubrahmanyam, K. S. Chithra	4:19
Total length:				25:32

== Remakes ==
Year	Film	Language	Ref
1993	Gadibidi Ganda	Kannada	
1994	Veera	Tamil	
1996	Saajan Chale Sasural	Hindi	
