= Telugu Mahila =

Women's Wing

Telugu Mahila తెలుగు మహిళ
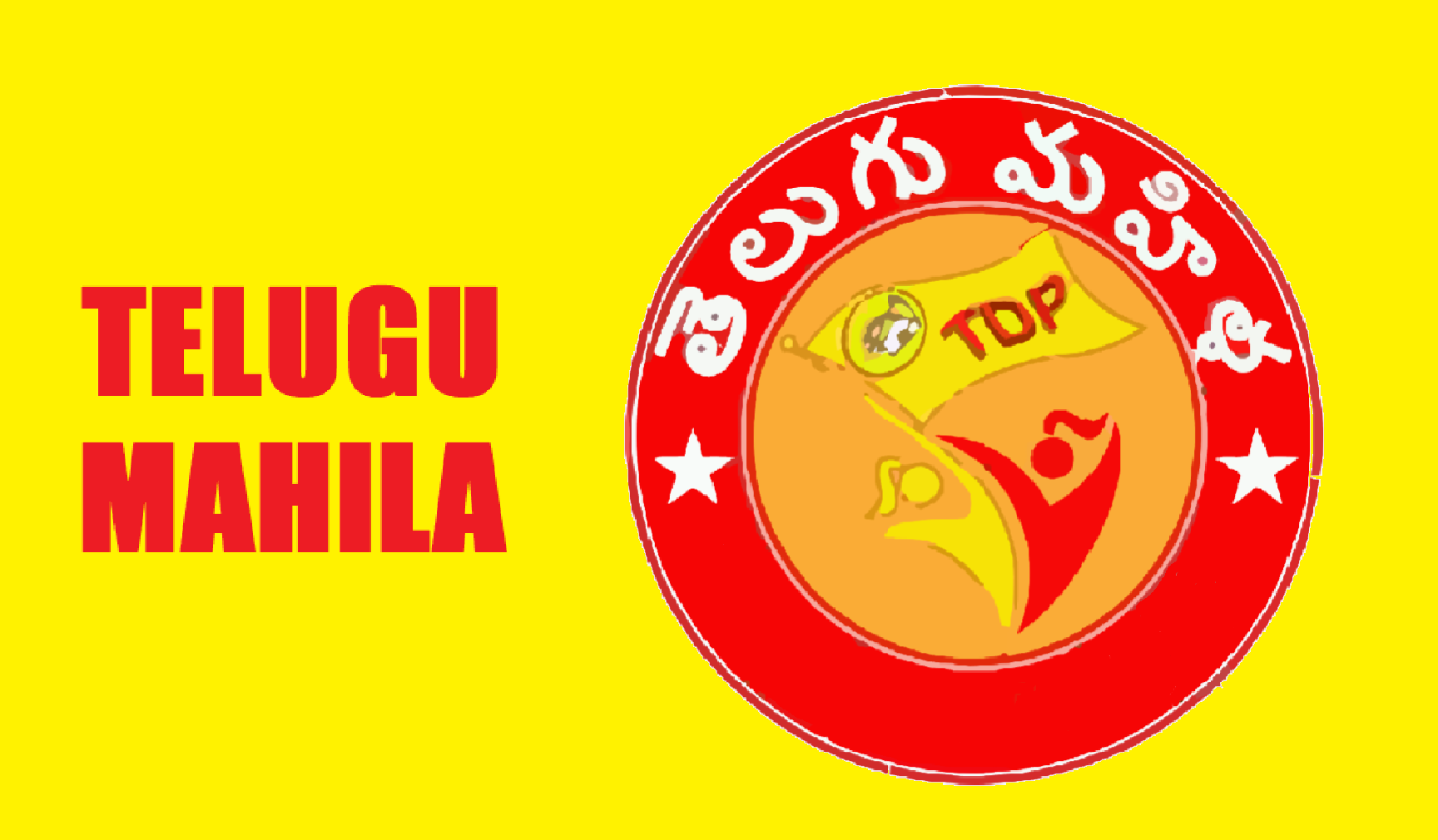
- President: Vangalapudi Anitha (Andhra Pradesh); Jyothsna Tirunagari (Telangana)
- Founded: 1996 (30 years ago)
- Alliance: National Democratic Alliance

Telugu Mahila is the Women's Wing of the Telugu Desam Party.

== Presidents ==
=== United Andhrapradesh ===
- Jaya Prada
- Nannapaneni Rajakumari
- Roja
- Shobha Haymavathi

=== Andhrapradesh ===
- Vangalapudi Anitha

=== Telangana ===
- Bandru Shobharani.
- Jyothsna Tirunagari
