= Muta Mestri =

- Theatrical Release poster
- Directed by: A. Kodandarami Reddy
- Screenplay by: Paruchuri Brothers
- Story by: Bhoopathi Raja
- Produced by: K. C. Sekhar Babu; D. Siva Prasad Reddy
- Starring: Chiranjeevi; Meena; Roja; Sharat Saxena
- Cinematography: S. Gopal Reddy
- Edited by: Kotagiri Venkateswara Rao
- Music by: Raj–Koti
- Production company: Kamakshi Devi Kamal Combines
- Release date: 17 January 1993 (India)
- Country: India
- Language: Telugu

Muta Mestri or Mutamestri (transl. Labour Leader or transl. Community Leader) is a 1993 Indian Telugu-language action drama film directed by A. Kodandarami Reddy. The film stars Chiranjeevi, Meena, Roja and Sharat Saxena in prominent roles. The music was composed by Raj–Koti.

Released on 17 January 1993, the film was a hit at the box office. Chiranjeevi won the Filmfare Award for Best Actor – Telugu for the film. It was dubbed and released in Tamil as Manbhumigu Maistri.

== Plot ==
Bose is a very patriotic man who fights for the rights of the local market workers against Aatma, the nearby underworld don. Seeing his dedication for helping the working poor, the Chief Minister asks him to enter politics. As a politician, he takes charge of a special branch of commandos and destroys Aatma's illegal operations. In retaliation, Aatma has Bose's sister falsely implicated in a prostitution case, after which she commits suicide on the court steps. Bose resigns from his position and takes revenge on Aatma. Finally, he returns to his old life at the market.

== Cast ==
- Chiranjeevi as Subhash Chandra Bose aka Bose
- Meena as Bujjamma
- Roja as Kalpana
- Mansoor Ali Khan as Inspector
- Brahmanandam as Coolie
- Sharat Saxena as Athma Ram
- Gummadi as Chief Minister
- Kota Srinivasa Rao
- J. V. Somayajulu
- Allu Ramalingaiah
- Srihari
- Yuvarani
- Narsing Yadav
- Silk Smitha special appearance in "Ee Petaku"
- Raghava Lawrence as a dancer in "Ee Petaku"

== Soundtrack ==
Music was composed by Raj–Koti. Veturi wrote five songs while Bhuvana Chandra wrote one. Music was released by Lahari Music.

In 2022, Chiranjeevi dressing up as Batman and dancing in the song "Vana Gadiyaramlo" became a popular internet meme with the release of the film The Batman.

Track listing
No.	Title	Lyrics	Singer(s)	Length
1.	"Ee Petaku Nene Mestri"	Veturi	S. P. Balasubrahmanyam	6:36
2.	"Anjanee Puthruda"	Veturi	S. P. Balasubrahmanyam, Chithra	5:11
3.	"Chikchik Cham"	Bhuvana Chandra	Mano, Chithra	5:26
4.	"Entha Ghatu Premayo"	Veturi	S. P. Balasubrahmanyam, Chithra	5:11
5.	"Jorugunnadi"	Veturi	S. P. Balasubrahmanyam, Chithra	4:59
6.	"Vana Gadiyaramlo"	Veturi	S. P. Balasubrahmanyam	10:25
Total length:				37:48

== Awards ==
- Chiranjeevi won the following Awards for his performance;
- Filmfare Award for Best Actor – Telugu
- Cinema Express Award for Best Telugu Actor
