= Ayudha Poojai =

- Poster
- Directed by: C. Sivakumar
- Written by: C. Sivakumar
- Produced by: N. Palanisamy
- Starring: Arjun; Urvashi; Roja
- Cinematography: M. V. Panneerselvam
- Edited by: S. M. V. Subbu
- Music by: Vidyasagar
- Production company: Bhagyam Cine Combines
- Release date: 24 November 1995
- Running time: 140 minutes
- Country: India
- Language: Tamil

Ayudha Poojai is a 1995 Indian Tamil-language action drama film written and directed by C. Sivakumar. The film stars Arjun, Urvashi and Roja. It was released on 24 November 1995.

== Plot ==
Krishnasamy, a respected man, and Samiyappan, a local don, have been in a feud for several years. Amudha, Krishnasamy's daughter, hates her father because she thinks that he is a killer.

A few years before, Krishnasamy was a tea master with his friend Kandhasamy. After his father's death, Krishnasamy had a lot of responsibilities. He fell in love with Sindhamani. In the meantime, Samiyappan cancelled his engagement because Sindhamani's father promised Sindhamani to his son. One day, Krishnasamy ridiculed Samiyappan at a political function. This humiliation irks Samiyappan, so his henchmen burned Krishnasamy's house, and Krishnasamy's brother, who was in the house, died. In anger, Krishnasamy entered Samiyappan's house and fought against his henchmen, but an honest police officer arrested him before he committed murder. The police officer gave Krishnasamy a mission to stop Samiyappan's illegal activities.

Thereafter, Krishnasamy became rich by seizing Samiyappan's black money. He cut Samiyappan's right hand when Samiyappan hurt the police officer. Sindhamani then married Samiyappan's son. Vasantha, who worked at the tea shop, fell in love with Krishnasamy. At first, Krishnasamy refused to marry her because he had a lot of enemies. His mother, however, managed to convince him, and he married her. Vasantha was very sensitive, and she was afraid of blood. When Samiyappan's henchmen planned to kill Krishnasamy, the police officer saved him, but he died instead. Knowing her husband's activities, Vasantha left his house pregnant.

Sindhamani is worried about Krishnasamy's situation. Meanwhile, Sindhamani ridicules Amudha in order to irritate Vasantha, who slapped her, and reveals that Krishnasamy is her husband. Vasantha hides her husband's identity to save her daughter from enemies. Finally, Krishnasamy wants to make peace with Samiyappan, while Samiyappan wants to kill him. Samiyappan's henchmen kidnap Amudha, and Samiyappan decides to kill her. Sindhamani hides Amudha and puts her daughter Sumathi instead of Amudha. Krishnasamy saves Sumathi, and Samiyappan apologizes to him.

== Cast ==
- Arjun as Krishnasamy
- Urvashi as Vasantha
- Roja as Sindhamani
- Goundamani as Kandasamy
- Nagesh as Police Officer
- Thilakan as Samiyappan
- Amarasigamani as Amarasigamani
- Sathyapriya as Krishnasamy's mother
- Raja as Samiyappan's son
- Sheela as Sumathi
- Nikitha as Amudha

== Production ==
The film marked the directorial debut of Sivakumar, who previously worked as assistant to K. Bhagyaraj. It was one of only two films directed by him, the other being Rettai Jadai Vayasu (1997) before his death in August 2018. The filming was held at Pollachi, Nagercoil.

== Soundtrack ==
The music was composed by Vidyasagar.

| Song | Lyricist | Singers |
|---|---|---|
| "Akka Kulikira" | Vaali | S. P. Balasubrahmanyam , K. S. Chithra |
| "Neikkarapatti Ponnamma" | Ilakkiyan | Mano |
| "Enneiya Vachu" | Vaali | Mano, Swarnalatha |
| "O.. Naan Ennaannu Solluven" | Vaali | S. P. Balasubrahmanyam, S. P. Sailaja |
| "Kandedutha puthaiyal" | Vaali | S. P. Balasubrahmanyam |
| "Mukkulichu edutha muthu" | Vaali | S. P. Balasubrahmanyam |
| "Vaanavillil udaikal" | Vaali | S. P. Balasubrahmanyam |

== Release ==
Aayudha Poojai was originally scheduled to be released on Diwali of 1995.

== Critical reception ==
Kalki praised the performances of the cast, the cinematography and editing, but panned the music and choreography, calling it double headache. The Hindu wrote, "Arjun continues to ride the success wave mixing his powerful fight scenes with some subdued, controlled acting in areas of drama".
