= Federation of Telangana and Andhra Pradesh Chambers of Commerce and Industry =

The Federation of Telangana Chambers of Commerce and Industry
- Abbreviation: FTCCI
- Formation: 1917; 109 years ago
- Type: Non-governmental trade association
- Headquarters: Hyderabad, Telangana, India
- Services: Policy Advocacy; Nurturing Competitiveness; International & Business Development
- Key people: Anil Agarwal (President); Meela Jayadev Sr VP,
- Website: ftcci.in

Federation of Telangana Chambers of Commerce and Industry (FTCCI) is an industry body in Telangana.

== History ==
The Chamber of Commerce was established in 1917 to represent Hyderabad State of the old Nizam's dominions. After the formation of Andhra Pradesh in 1956, its name was changed to 'The Federation of Andhra Pradesh Chambers of Commerce and Industry'in 1958. After the bifurcation of the State into erstwhile Andhra Pradesh and newly formed State of Telangana in 2014, it was rechristened as 'The Federation of Telangana & Andhra Pradesh Chambers of Commerce and Industry.'

FTCCI liaises between Trade, Industry and the Government, participating & suggesting to the government on their policies on industry, labor laws, energy, environment, direct & indirect taxes & various issues. It also draws attention and represents industry about the issues and challenges of industry & trade. FTAPCCI conducts studies on various subjects related to trade and industry and acts as a knowledge chamber. FTAPCCI has got a membership of more than 3000 direct members and with its 160 Associations/Chambers of Commerce and an indirect membership of over 25000.

== Services of FTCCI ==
Presently the Chamber lends its support to the Government in its effort to promote economic growth of the country through planned programme of economic development. FAPCCI has oriented its organization set up and approach so that it could render better and greater services to its members: The Chamber invites Union Ministers, Chief Ministers of different States, Ambassadors/High Commissioners of various countries in India and high level dignitaries. Secretaries of important Ministries and Heads of various departments are invited for a dialogue with Chamber's members on current issues.

The Chamber receives several business delegations both from developed and developing countries as well as high level Government officials from various countries every year, thus contributing significantly to India's International business relations. It also sponsors business missions abroad and participates in international exhibitions.
