= Saajan Chale Sasural =

1996 Indian film by David Dhawan

- Poster
- Directed by: David Dhawan
- Written by: Kader Khan (dialogues)
- Screenplay by: Rumi Jaffery
- Based on: Allari Mogudu by K. Raghavendra Rao
- Produced by: Mansoor Siddiqui
- Starring: Govinda; Tabu; Karisma Kapoor; Satish Kaushik
- Cinematography: Rajan Kinagi
- Music by: Nadeem-Shravan
- Production company: Anas Films
- Release date: 12 April 1996
- Running time: 134 minutes
- Country: India
- Language: Hindi
- Budget: est. ₹4.5 crore
- Box office: est. ₹23.55 crore

Saajan Chale Sasural (transl. Lover Goes to His In-laws) is a 1996 Indian Hindi-language romantic comedy film starring Govinda, Tabu, Karisma Kapoor, Kader Khan, and Satish Kaushik. It was directed by David Dhawan. It is a remake of the Telugu film Allari Mogudu (1992). It was a major commercial success and listed second among the top five "super-hits" of 1996 by the Indian Express.

== Plot ==
Shyamsunder is a naive villager who has a great interest in music. He travels to the city, making friends with Muthuswami, a South Indian tabla player. The president of the TIPS cassette company, Khurana, is impressed with his musical abilities and promotes him to a high position. As he returns to repay his debts in the village, he receives the tragic news of the death of his wife Pooja, who died in a flood. He then marries Khurana's daughter Divya. When Khurana has a heart attack, Shyamsunder finds his "presumed dead" wife Pooja in the hospital. He then has to fool his two wives, even if it includes leading a double life to make sure Pooja and Divya don't discover he has married both of them.

== Cast ==
- Govinda as Shyamsundar Gupta
- Tabu as Divya Khurana
- Karishma Kapoor as Pooja Daschandani
- Kader Khan as Dhirendra Khurana
- Shakti Kapoor as Singer / Musician
- Satish Kaushik as Muranchand "Mutthu" Swami
- Satish Shah as Rampyare Rastogi / Company manager
- Mukesh Rishi as Nana
- Anjana Mumtaz as Hemalata Gupta
- Himani Shivpuri as Fake Hemalata Gupta
- Arun Bakshi as Madhav
- Arjun as Nahar Singh, Thakur's son
- Dinesh Hingoo as Travel Agent
- Rakesh Bedi as Hotel servant Kaushik Singhania
- Bharat Kapoor as Thakur Gopal Singh
- Raju Shrestha as Shyamsunder's friend

== Trivia ==
1.In a Recent podcast Raju Shrestha said that During the premier of khuddar it was announced that Govinda is going to do the remake of Allari Mogudu with Talat Jaani as director & Raju Shrestha going to play the Mutthu role, but Govinda had a fight with director Talat Jani so producer changed the director & bring David Dhawan who later given the role of Mutthu to Satish Kaushik which won him Filmfare Award for best comedian it almost broke the heart of Raju Shrestha who was preparing the role for almost 2 years. 2.After the blockbuster success the pair Govinda-Karishma-Tabbu was seen in 2000 Crime Thriller Shikari film again.

== Soundtrack ==
Saajan Chale Sasural

Soundtrack album by Nadeem-Shravan
- Released: Apr 12, 1996
- Recorded: 1995
- Genre: Feature film soundtrack
- Length: 36.07
- Label: Tips Music

The music for this movie was composed by Nadeem-Shravan. The singers include Kumar Sanu, Alka Yagnik, Udit Narayan, Poornima, Vinod Rathod, Kunal Ganjawala & Satyanarayan Mishra lent their voice for the album. According to the Indian trade website Box Office India, with around 2,500,000 units sold the soundtrack became the fifth highest-grossing album of the year.

#	Title	Singer(s)
1	"Dil Jaane Jigar Tujh Pe Nisaar"	Kumar Sanu; Alka Yagnik
2	"Ram Narayan Baaja Bajata"	Udit Narayan
3	"Chahat Se Hai Begani"	Kumar Sanu; Alka Yagnik
4	"Tum Toh Dhokebaaz Ho"	Kumar Sanu Alka Yagnik
5	"Doob Ke Dariya Mein Kar Lungi Khudkhushi"	Udit Narayan; Poornima
6	"Main Hoon Number Ek Gawaiyya"	Vinod Rathod; Kunal Ganjawala; Satyanarayan Mishra
7	"Bye Bye Miss Goodnight"	Kumar Sanu; Alka Yagnik
