= Roja Selvamani =

Indian actress and politician

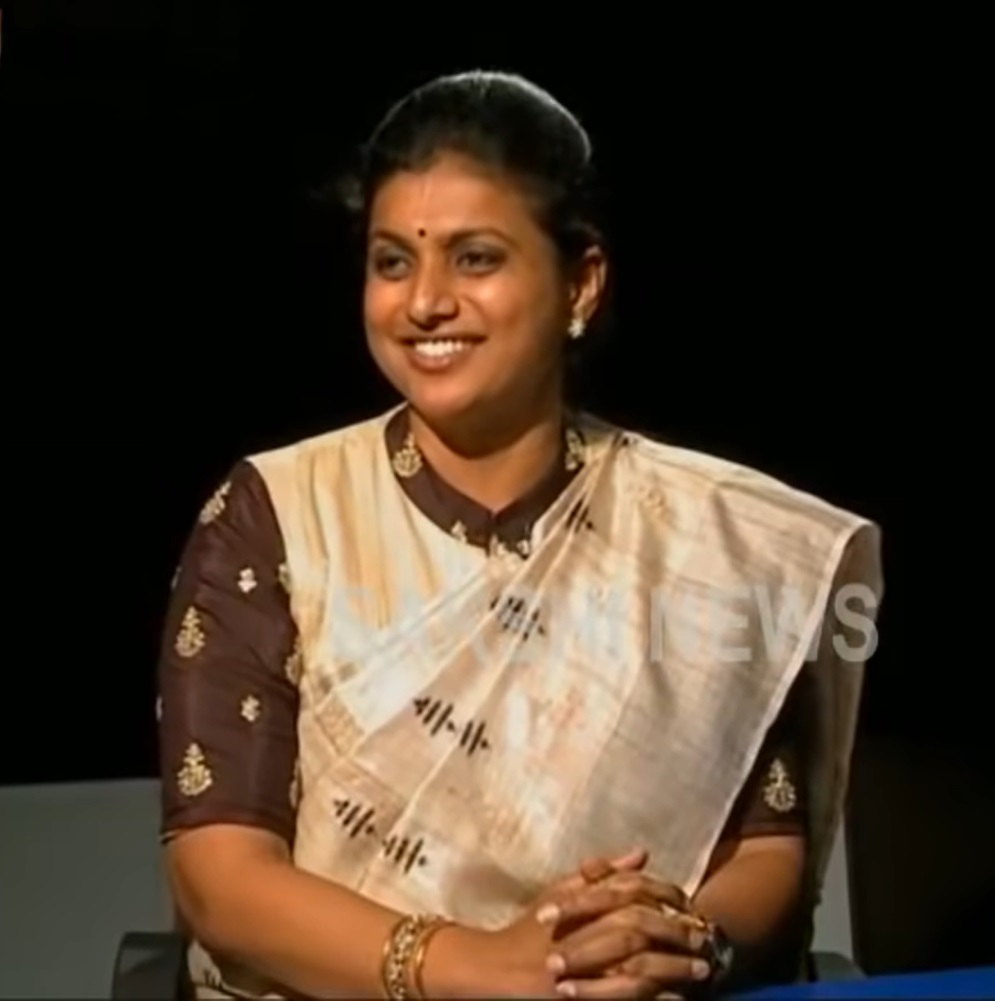
- Roja at an interview with Sakshi TV

Minister for Tourism, Culture and Youth Advancement Government of Andhra Pradesh
- In office 11 April 2022 – 4 June 2024
- Governor: Biswabhusan Harichandan; S. Abdul Nazeer
- Chief Minister: Y. S. Jagan Mohan Reddy
- Preceded by: Avanthi Srinivas
- Succeeded by: Kandula Durgesh Mandipalli Ramprasad Reddy

Chairperson of Andhra Pradesh Industrial Infrastructure Corporation
- In office 15 July 2019 – 17 July 2021
- Succeeded by: Mettu Govinda Reddy

1st President of YSRCP Women's Wing
- In office 2015–2021
- YSRCP President: Y. S. Jagan Mohan Reddy
- Preceded by: Office Established
- Succeeded by: Pothula Sunitha

Member of Legislative Assembly Andhra Pradesh
- In office 19 June 2014 – 4 June 2024
- Preceded by: Gali Muddu Krishnama Naidu
- Succeeded by: Gali Bhanu Prakash
- Constituency: Nagari

3rd President of Telugu Mahila United Andhra Pradesh
- In office 1999–2009
- TDP President: N. Chandrababu Naidu
- Preceded by: Nannapaneni Rajakumari
- Succeeded by: Shobha Haymavathi

Personal details
- Born: Sri Latha Reddy; 17 November 1972 (age 54) Bhakarapeta, Tirupati district, Andhra Pradesh, India
- Party: Yuvajana Shramika Rythu Congress Party (2011 - present)
- Other political affiliations: Telugu Desam Party (1998 - 2009); Indian National Congress (2009 - 2011)
- Spouse: R. K. Selvamani (m. 2002)
- Children: 2
- Occupation: Actress; Politician
- Awards: Nandi Awards; Tamil Nadu State Film Award for Best Actress; Cinema Express Awards; Filmfare Awards

Roja Selvamani (born Sri Latha Reddy on 17 November 1972), credited as Roja, is an Indian politician and actress with the YSR Congress Party. She served as Minister for Tourism, Culture and Youth Advancement of Andhra Pradesh since 11 April 2022 until a landslide defeat in 2024 assembly elections.

Starting her acting career in a supporting role in the Telugu film, Prema Thapassu in 1991, Roja earned her first Nandi Award under Special jury category for her performance in Sarpayagam (1991). She further expanded her career to Tamil with Chembaruthi (1992) and Kannada with Gadibidi Ganda (1993). Both these projects were successful and paved the way for her future commercial films such as Uzhaippali (1993) and Veera (1994) (both opposite Rajinikanth), Muta Mestri (1993), Bhairava Dweepam (1994), which fetched her Nandi Award for Best Actress, Raasaiyya (1995) and Vallal (1997). Her biggest commercially successful and critically acclaimed role came with the film, Unnidathil Ennai Koduthen (1999), for which she won the Tamil Nadu State Film Award for Best Actress and Cinema Express Award for Best Actress – Tamil. These films established Roja as a leading actress in Tamil Telugu Malayalam Kannada films through 1990s and early 2000s.

Roja served as a Minister for Tourism Culture and Youth Advancement for the Government of Andhra Pradesh from 2022 until a landslide defeat in 2024 assembly elections. Her first political stint, although, was with the Telugu Desam Party from 1999 till 2009.

== Early life ==
Roja was born as Sri Latha Reddy to Nagaraja Reddy and Lalitha in Tirupati, Tirupati district, Andhra Pradesh. She has two brothers, Kumaraswamy Reddy and Ramaprasad Reddy. Later, the family moved to Hyderabad. She got her bachelor's degree in Political Science from Sri Padmavathi Women's University, Tirupati. Roja learnt Kuchipudi and was performing in dance before she entered films.

== Career ==
=== Film career ===
Roja entered the film industry with Telugu film Prema Thapassu (1991) with Rajendra Prasad.

She was introduced to the Tamil film industry by director R. K. Selvamani with Chembaruthi (1992), along with actor Prashanth. The movie was a hit and paved way for role in another success, Suriyan (1992) with Sarath Kumar. Both the films established her in Tamil cinema.

She became known for songs such as "Meloor Maman" in the film Makkal Aatchi (1995) with Mammootty and "Mastana Mastana" in Raasaiyya (1995) with Prabhu Deva. Her performance in films with actors such as Rajinikanth in Veera (1994), Arjun Sarja in Ayudha Poojai (1996) and Prabhu in Thirupathi Ezhumalai Venkatesa (1999) were praised. Roja's major career breakthrough was in the film Unnidathil Ennai Koduthen (1998), directed by Vikraman.

In Telugu, she appeared in successful movies like Mutha Mestri (1993), Mugguru Monagallu (1994), Bhairava Dweepam (1994), Anna (1994), Bobbili Simham (1994), Subhalagnam (1994), Roja (1994), Kshemamga Velli Labhamga Randi (1996), Peddannayya (1997), Annamayya (1997) and Sri Krishnarjuna Vijayam (2000)

In Kannada, she appeared in successful movies like Gadibidi Ganda (1993), Kalavida (1997), Sundara Kanda (2001)

Her 100th movie was Pottu Amman (2000).

Roja later appeared in supporting roles in films like Arasu (2003), Parijatham (2006), Shambo Shiva Shambo (2010), Golimar (2010), Kaavalan (2011), Veera (2011), Kodipunju (2011), Mogudu (2011) and Saguni (2012).

=== Political career ===
Roja joined Telugu Desam Party (TDP) in 1998 and was the president of the Telugu Mahila wing of the Party. In the 2004 Andhra Pradesh Legislative Assembly elections, she contested from the Nagari Assembly constituency but did not emerge victorious. In 2009 Indian general election, Roja ran for the Chandragiri Assembly constituency but faced another defeat, this time against Aruna Kumari Galla. In the same year she left TDP and joined the Indian National Congress, which was led by Y. S. Rajasekhara Reddy at the time. Following the passing of Rajasekhara Reddy, his son, Jagan Mohan Reddy, decided to part ways with the Congress and established the YSR Congress Party. In response to these developments, Roja made the decision to leave the Congress and joined the YSRCP. In 2014 assembly elections, she won as an MLA from Nagari assembly constituency. She contested once again from Nagari in 2019 assembly election and won the seat again. In 2020, she assumed the role of Chairperson of APIIC. Then, in 2022 she was appointed the Minister for Tourism, Culture and Youth Advancement portfolio.

Despite Roja being an active speaker among women MLAs, she was suspended from attending the legislative assembly for one year. The decision was taken by majority in the legislative house, on 18 December 2015, and by the approval of the Speaker. Y. S. Jagan Mohan Reddy, leader of the opposition, opposed the suspension. There were several concerns on the procedure followed while suspending Roja. Such doubts made the opposition to move no-trust motion against the speaker. An issue was raised by the opposition party on how the media clipping, property of the house, released and published on social media without the speaker's approval and the speaker also noted their concern and set up an inquiry to probe the issue further and submit a report by next meeting.

=== Electoral history ===
==== Andhra Pradesh Legislative Assembly ====
Year	Constituency	Party	Votes	%	Opponent	Opponent Party	Opponent Votes	%	Result	Margin	%
2024	Nagari	YSRCP	62,794	35.17	Gali Bhanu Prakash	TDP	107,797	60.38	Lost	-45,003	-25.21
2019	Nagari	YSRCP	80,333	47.6	Gali Bhanu Prakash	TDP	77,625	46	Won	2,708	1.6
2014	Nagari	YSRCP	74,724	47.23	Gali Muddu Krishnama Naidu	TDP	73,866	46.69	Won	858	0.54
2009	Chandragiri	TDP	60,962	35.68	Aruna Kumari Galla	INC	71,942	42.1	Lost	-10,980	-6.42
2004	Nagari	TDP	59,867	46.39	Chengareddy Reddyvari	INC	65,561	50.8	Lost	-5,694	-4.41

== Other work ==
Roja was the anchor of a show named Modern Mahalakshmi before getting replaced by Anasuya. This show was telecast on MAA TV. She is one of the judges for the comedy shows Jabardasth and Extra Jabardasth. These shows are telecast on ETV. She hosted one show for Zee Tamizh called lucka kicka, which was a huge hit in Tamil Nadu.

== Personal life ==
Roja married Tamil film director R. K. Selvamani on 21 August 2002. The couple has a daughter and a son.

Roja had a penchant for hairdressing and it was evident as whenever she was on the sets she was seen hairdressing her peers like Devayani, Khushbu, Ranjitha and Mumtaz to name a few. According to Ramya Krishna, Soundarya, Nagma, Rambha, Meena, her friends and co-stars, Roja is one of the few artists who can do their makeup themselves.

== Filmography ==
=== Tamil cinema ===
Year	Title	Role	Notes
1992	Chembaruthi	Chembaruthi	Tamil Debut
1992	Suriyan	Usha	
1993	Uzhaippali	Vimala	
1994	Athiradi Padai	Bharathi	
1994	Indhu	Indhu	
1994	Veera	Rubakala	
1994	Sarigamapadani	Archana	
1995	Engirundho Vandhan	Radha	
1995	Raja Muthirai	Priya	
1995	Asuran	Parvathi	
1995	Raasaiyya	Anitha	
1995	Makkal Aatchi	Sarasu	
1995	Ayudha Poojai	Sindhamani	
1996	Parambarai	Paruvatham	
1996	Rajali	Rani	
1996	Tamizh Selvan	Fathima	
1997	Vallal	Madhavi	
1997	Adimai Changili	Senthamarai	
1997	Pasamulla Pandiyare	Revathi	
1997	Kadavul	Parvathi	
1997	Arasiyal	Supriya	
1998	Unnidathil Ennai Koduthen	Radha	Tamil Nadu State Film Award for Best Actress; Cinema Express Award for Best Actress – Tamil
1998	En Aasai Rasave	Nagajyoti	
1998	Veeram Vilanja Mannu	Village Girl	
1998	Pudhumai Pithan	Shenbagam	
1998	Kaadhal Kavithai	Herself	Special appearance in the song "Aalana Naal Mudhala"
1999	House Full	Writer	
1999	Chinna Raja	Radha	
1999	Nenjinile	Herself	Special appearance in the song "Thanga Nirathuku"
1999	Chinna Durai	Pushpavalli	
1999	Suyamvaram	Easwari	
1999	Mugam	Malini	
1999	Ooty	Charu	
1999	Thirupathi Ezhumalai Venkatesa	Ragini	
1999	Azhagarsamy	Suja	
2000	Thirunelveli	Kattazhagi	
2000	Eazhaiyin Sirippil	Saroja	
2000	Sandhitha Velai	Thilaka	
2000	Kandha Kadamba Kathir Vela	Rupini	
2000	Koodi Vazhnthal Kodi Nanmai	Tamizhselvi	
2000	Puratchikkaaran	Kanimozhi	
2000	Independence Day	Asha	
2000	Pottu Amman	Durga	100th film
2001	Looty	Geetha	
2001	Nila Kaalam	Veni	
2001	Sonnal Thaan Kaadhala	Roja	
2001	Super Kudumbam	Raakku	
2001	Viswanathan Ramamoorthy	Meena	
2001	Maayan	Azhagamma	
2001	Veettoda Mappillai	Meena	
2001	Mitta Miraasu	Meenakshi	
2001	Kottai Mariamman	Kottai Mariamman	
2002	Angala Parameswari	Parvati	
2002	Shakalaka Baby	Shenbagam (Shakalaka Baby)	
2003	Arasu	Sivagami	
2003	Success	Radhika	
2005	Maayavi	Herself	Special appearance
2005	Karagattakkari		
2006	Pasa Kiligal	Angayarkanni	
2006	Parijatham	Sridhar's Mother	
2006	Kurukshetram	Vaishnavi	
2007	Kuttrapathirikai	Geetha	
2007	Ninaithu Ninaithu Parthen	Adhikesavan's mother	
2008	Ellam Avan Seyal	Jaggubai	
2011	Kaavalan	Devika Muthu Ramalingam	
2012	Saguni	Sreedevi's Mother	
2013	Masani	Rajeshwari	
2013	Apple Penne	Hamsavalli	
2015	Killadi	Angayarkanni	
2015	Pulan Visaranai 2	Saranya	
2015	En Vazhi Thani Vazhi	Renuka Devi	
2026	Anbe Diana	Sarala	
2026	Lenin Pandiyan	Sandhanam	

=== Telugu cinema ===
Year	Title	Role (dubbed voice)	Notes
1991	Prema Thapassu	Muthyalu	Telugu Debut
1991	Sarpayagam	Anupama	Special Jury-Nandi Award
1992	Seetharatnam Gari Abbayi	Manga	
1992	Atta Sommu Alludi Daanam	Baby	
1992	Prema Vijetha		
1993	Rakshana		Special appearance in the song "Ghallu Mamdi Basu"
1993	Attaku Koduku Mamaku Alludu	Roja	
1993	Illu Pelli		
1993	Nakshatra Poratam		
1993	Moggudugaru	Roja	
1993	Mutha Mestri	Kalpana	
1994	Mugguru Monagallu	Seetha (Roja Ramani)	
1994	Bhairava Dweepam	Princess Padmavathi (Roja Ramani)	Nandi Award for Best Actress
1994	Gandeevam	Roja	
1994	Bobbili Simham	Krishnaveni (Saritha)	
1994	Anna	Chandi	Nandi Award for Best Supporting Actress
1994	Police Brothers	Kanaka Durga	
1994	Subhalagnam	Lata (Roja Ramani)	
1994	Roja	Bharathi	
1995	Big Boss	Roja (Roja Ramani)	
1995	Maatho Pettukoku	Lata	
1995	Maya Bazaar	Special appearance	
1995	Telugu Veera Levara	Talupulamma	
1995	Vajram	Kuali	
1995	Pokiri Raja	Chandramukhi	
1995	Ghatotkachudu	Roja	
1996	Topi Raja Sweety Roja	Roja	
1996	Rayudugaru Nayudugaru		
1996	Sri Krishnarjuna Vijayam	Draupadi(Roja Ramani)	
1997	Peddannayya	Seeta(Roja Ramani)	
1997	Adavilo Anna	Rani	
1997	Radayatra	Kasturi	
1997	Annamayya	Saluva Narasimha Rayalu's wife(Roja Ramani)	
1998	Sambhavam		
1998	Pelladi Chupistha		
1998	Swarnakka	Swarnakka	Nandi Award for Best Actress
1998	Vaibhavam		
1998	Mee Aayana Jagratha	Sundari	
1999	Sultan	Revathi	
2000	Sammakka Sarakka	Sarakka	
2000	Kshemamga Velli Labhamga Randi	Geetha (Saritha)	
2000	Tirumala Tirupati Venkatesa	Ragini	
2001	Railway Coolie	Lakshmi	
2001	Family Circus	Durga	
2001	Durga	Durga	
2002	Police Sisters	ACP Jhansi	
2010	Shambo Shiva Shambo	Home Minister	
2010	Golimaar	Arundathi	
2011	Parama Veera Chakra	Movie artist	
2011	Mogudu	Politician Chamundeswari	
2011	Kodipunju	Sita Ratnam as Tanish's Mother	
2011	Veera	Satya's mother	
2011	Sri Rama Rajyam	Bhudevi	
2012	Lucky	Lucky's boss	
2013	Pavitra	Munna's mother	
2013	Sri Jagadguru Adi Shankara	Goddess Lakshmi	
2013	Kamina		
2013	D/O Varma		

=== Kannada cinema ===
Year	Title	Role	Notes
1993	Gadibidi Ganda	Neelambari	Kannada Debut
1997	Kalavida	Kavana	
1999	Premotsava	Bhavana	
2000	Independence Day		
2000	Bharatha Naari		
2001	Grama Devathe	Parvati	
2001	Sundara Kanda		
2002	Parva	Sudha	
2004	Maurya	Meena	

=== Malayalam cinema ===
Year	Title	Role	Notes
1997	Gangothri	Nandana Menon	Malayalam Debut
2002	Malayali Mamanu Vanakkam	Parvathy	
2015	Jamna Pyari	Neelambari	150 th film

=== Television ===
Year	Title	Role	Language	Channel	Notes
2002–2003	Nathi Enge Pogirathu	Sindhu	Tamil	Star Vijay	TV Serial
2004	Uttarayana	Jaya Gouri	Kannada	Udaya TV	TV Serial
2010–2013	Modern Mahalakshmi	Host	Telugu	Maa TV	TV show
2011	Nachore	Judge	Telugu	Zee Telugu	TV show
2013–2022	Jabardasth	Judge	Telugu	ETV	Weekly
2014–2022	Extra Jabardasth	Judge	Telugu	ETV	Weekly
2014–2015	Race	Host	Telugu	Zee Telugu	TV show
2015	Luckka Kikka : Genes	Host	Tamil	Zee Tamil	TV show
2015	Ragada : The Ultimate Dance Show	Judge	Telugu	Tollywood TV Telugu	TV show
2015–2016	Jabardast 31 : December Celebrations	Judge	Telugu	ETV	TV Programme
2016	Genes (season 2)	Host	Tamil	Zee Tamil	TV show
2016–2017	Racchabanda	Host	Telugu	Gemini TV	TV show
2016	Dasara Mahostavam	Judge	Telugu	ETV Telugu	TV Programme
2017	Pandem Kollu	Judge	Telugu	ETV Telugu	TV Programme
2017	Ugadi 369	Judge	Telugu	ETV Telugu	TV Programme
2017	Junior Super Stars (season 2)	Judge	Tamil	Zee Tamizh	TV show
2017	Weekend with Stars	Guest	Tamil	Zee Tamil	Talk Show
2017	Konchem Touch Lo Unte Chepta (Season 3)	Guest	Telugu	Zee Telugu	TV show
2018	Bathuku Jatka Bandi	Host	Telugu	Zee Telugu	TV show
2018	Aha Naa Pellanta	Judge	Telugu	ETV Telugu	TV Programme
2018	Rangasthalam	Judge	Telugu	Gemini TV	TV Dance Show
2019	Lollupa	Host	Tamil	Sun TV	TV Programme
2019	Tasmath Jagratha	Host	Telugu	Gemini TV	Crime Patrol
2020	Amma Sarileru Nikevvaru	Host	Telugu	Gemini TV	TV Programme
2026	Cooku with Comali season 7	Judge	Tamil	Star Vijay	TV cooking-comedy show

== Awards ==
Nandi Awards

- Special Jury Award – Sarpayagam (1991)
- Best Actress - Bhairava Dweepam (1994)
- Best Supporting Actress – Anna (1994)
- Best Actress – Swarnakka (1998)

Tamil Nadu State Film Awards

- 1998 – Tamil Nadu State Film Award for Best Actress – Unnidathil Ennai Koduthen

Cinema Express Awards

- 1998 – Cinema Express Award for Best Actress – Tamil – Unnidathil Ennai Koduthen

Filmfare Award South

- 2010 – Filmfare Award for Best Supporting Actress – Telugu – Golimaar

Honours

- 1998 – Kalaimamani Award
