= Makkena Mallikarjuna Rao =

Indian politician

MLA, Andhra Pradesh
- In office 2004–2009
- Constituency: Vinukonda

Personal details
- Party: TDP
- Other political affiliations: Indian National Congress

Makkena Mallikarjuna Rao served as the Member of the Legislative Assembly for Vinukonda constituency in Andhra Pradesh, India, between 2004 and 2009. He represented the Indian National Congress. He first worked as sarpanch for Gonuguntlavaripalem Mandal, then ran for MLA in 2004 and won the election. He formed the Rajiv Foundation which helps poor people. He improved many agricultural activities and built many wells for the farmers.

He was elected as DCC President (Indian National Congress).

In 2019, he joined YSR Congress party. In 2024, he joined TDP in the presence of Shri N.Chandra Babu Naidu as he had conflicts with current MLA of Vinukonda Bolla.
