= Gali Muddu Krishnama Naidu =

Indian politician

Shri. Gali Muddu Krishnama Naidu
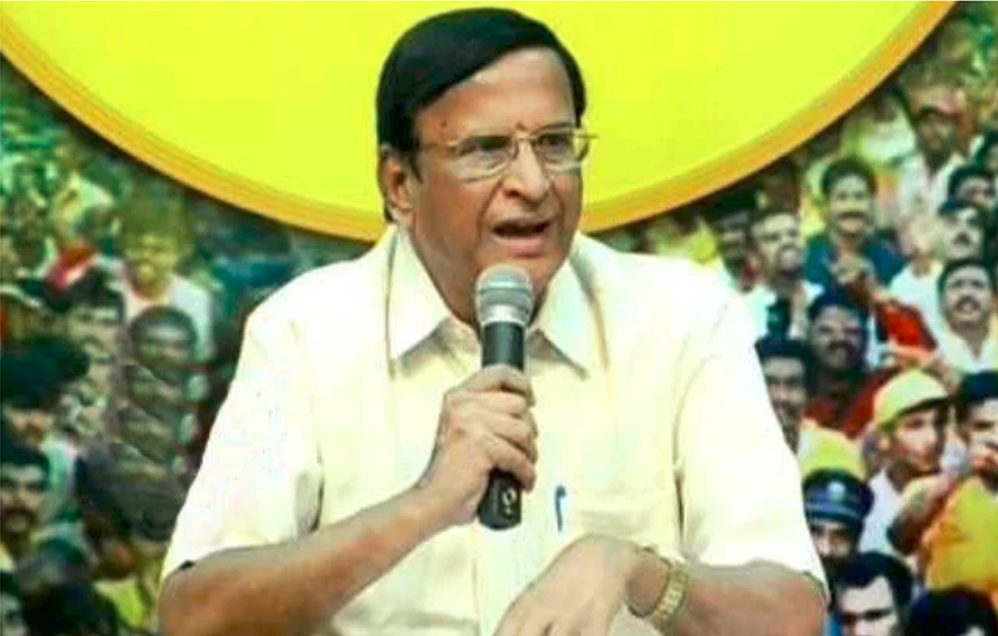

Member of Legislative Assembly United Andhra Pradesh
- In office 2009-2014
- Preceded by: Chengareddy Reddyvari
- Succeeded by: R.K Roja
- Constituency: Nagari
- In office 2004-2009
- Preceded by: Reddivari Rajasekhar Reddy
- Succeeded by: Constituency Dissolved
- Constituency: Puttur
- In office 1983-1999
- Preceded by: KB Siddaiah
- Succeeded by: Reddivari Rajasekhar Reddy
- Constituency: Puttur

Personal details
- Born: 9 June 1947 Venkatramapuram, Chittoor, Madras Presidency, British India^{[a]}
- Died: 7 February 2018 (aged 70) Hyderabad, Telangana, India
- Party: Telugu Desam Party (1983 - 2018)

Gali Muddu Krishnama Naidu (26 May 1947 – 7 February 2018) was an Indian politician from Andhra Pradesh. He served as Minister of Higher Education, Andhra Pradesh. He was elected for a record six terms to the Andhra Pradesh Legislative Assembly, five times from the former Puttur constituency and once from the Nagari constituency.

== Early life ==
Gali Muddu Krishnama Naidu was born on 26 May 1947, in Venkatramapuram village of Ramachandrapuram mandal in the Chittoor District of Andhra Pradesh.^{[a]} His father was G. Rama Naidu and his mother was G. Rajamma. He was the youngest of three children; he had an older sister Duttuluri Jayalakshmi and an older brother Gali Dhanunjaya Naidu.

Naidu graduated with a BSc and obtained a master's degree in arts as well as a law degree. Before he joined politics, he taught as a college lecturer in Guntur.

== Political career ==
Naidu joined politics after a successful career in teaching. He joined the Telugu Desam Party (TDP) where he enjoyed the support of its founder member, N.T. Rama Rao, who founded the party in 1983. He was elected five times to the Andhra Pradesh Legislative Assembly for the TDP from the Puttur constituency.

After some differences with the TDP, he left to join the Indian National Congress party, where he contested a ticket and won the election in 2004. He subsequently resigned from the congress and rejoined the TDP in 2008; he was then re-elected to his sixth (and final) term to the Andhra Pradesh Legislative Assembly in 2009, this time for the Nagari constituency. By now the Puttur constituency had been dissolved into the Nagari constituency following the delimitation of constituencies in 2008.

He held a cabinet post in the Ministry for Education, as Minister of Higher Education. When serving as a minister, he held education and forest portfolios.

Naidu officiated over many development works in the city of Puttur, including the construction of a road-over-bridge at the Santhi theatre level crossing, and the Puttur to Chittoor highway.

== Personal life ==
Naidu was married to Smt G. Saraswathi from Velanjeri village near Tiruttani in Tamil Nadu. He had two sons, named Bhanu Prakash Gali and Jagadish Prakash Gali, and a daughter named Lavanya Gali.

As well as being a teacher, he was an agriculturist and enjoyed reading books.

He underwent heart surgery three months before his death.

== Death ==
Naidu was admitted to a private hospital in Hyderabad on 3 February 2018 to receive treatment for dengue fever. He died four days later from multiple organ failure.

== Notes ==
^{a} At the time of Naidu's birth, Chittoor was in the Madras Presidency (this became the Madras Province shortly thereafter and later the Madras State), and is now in the state of Andhra Pradesh which was newly formed nine years after Naidu was born.
