= Nannapaneni Rajakumari =

Indian politician

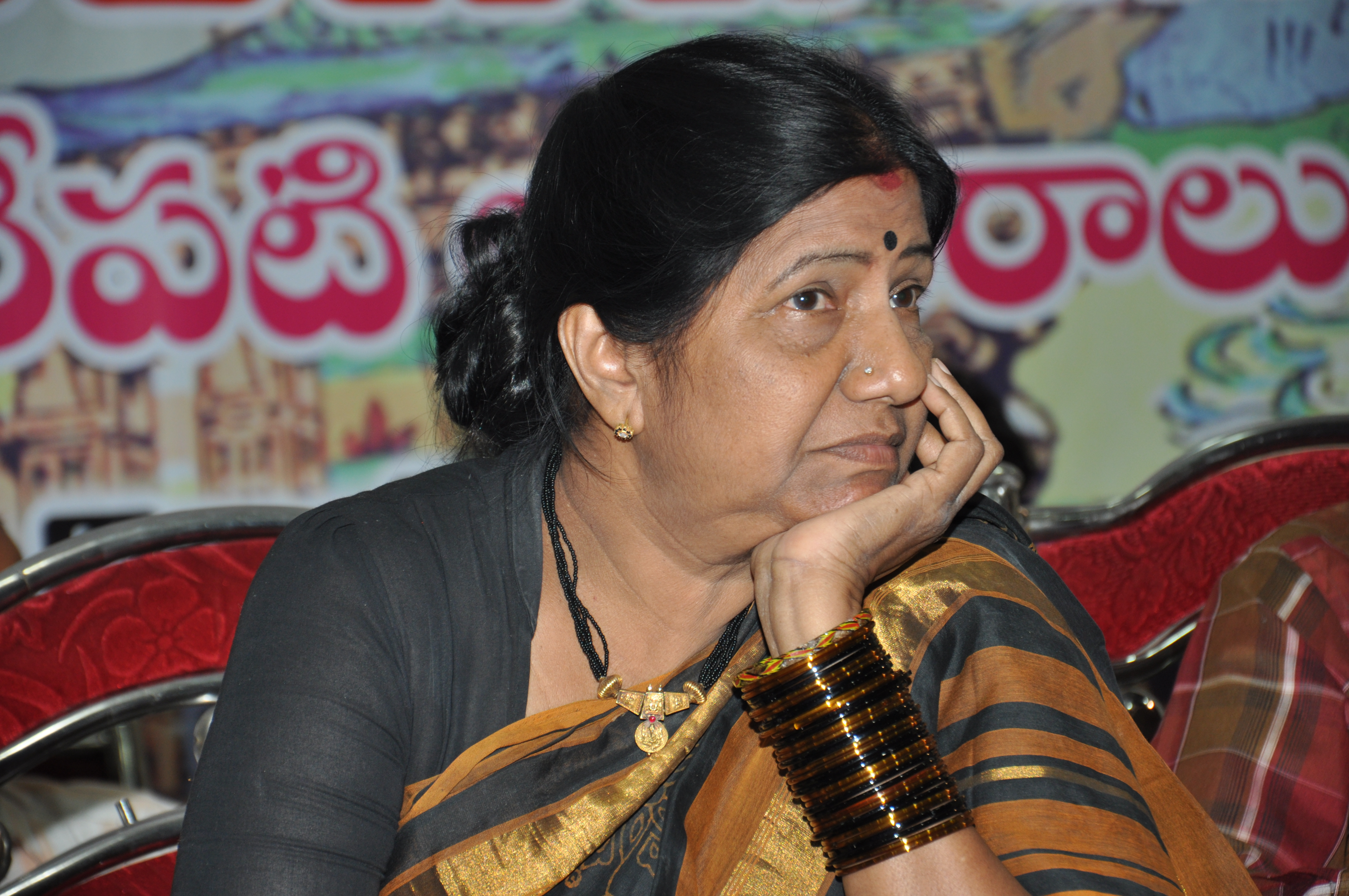
- Nannapaneni Rajakumari

Chief Whip, Andhra Pradesh Legislative Council
- Incumbent
- Assumed office 6 September 2014
- Constituency: Narasaraopet mp from TDP in 2014

Chief Whip, Cultural Affairs and Tourism minister
- In office 1990–1995

Personal details
- Born: 9 October 1948 (age 78) Saripudi, Guntur district Andhra Pradesh
- Party: Telugu Desam Party
- Spouse: Nannapaneni Mukunda Rao
- Children: Nannapaneni Raghu, Nannapaneni Sudh a
- Website: http://www.telugudesam.org
- Ntg

Nannapaneni Rajakumari is an Indian politician and ex-chairwoman of AP state Women's Commission and Telugu Desam Party (TDP) leader. She is an official spokesperson for the TDP.

== Political career ==
She entered politics when the actor N. T. Rama Rao started the Telugu Desam party. Rajakumari was elected as MLA to Andhra Pradesh Assembly on two occasions, from Sattenapalli (1983–1985) and Vinukonda (1989–1994). She worked as minister for Cultural affairs and Tourism in Nadendla Bhaskara Rao's government.

She was the first women to ever become chief whip in India during the N. Janardhana Reddy and Dr. Chenna Reddy regimes. She also worked President of Andhra Pradesh State Mahila Congress. Rajakumari also held president of Telugu Mahila, women wing of Telugu Desam party.

Rajakumari declared she would be on a fast-unto-death from 20 December 2009 against the bifurcation of AndhraPradesh state with pressure from some groups from Telegana. Federal Government announced on 9 December 2009 that process of bifurcation process will begin and later clarified on 23 December the process will begin only after wide consultation with groups from all regions of the state. Rajakumari called off her strike after this announcement from the federal government.

Rajakumari wrote several novels, most famous one include 'Nannapaneni Navarathnalu 'series of 9 novels. Her interest in singing and writing is well known. She was good painter as well. Rajakumari spoke n All India Radio (AIR) on 97 prime time occasions on different issues of public interest.

== Films ==
She plays the role as a justice in Taraka Ratna's Vijetha film.
