= Avudari Venkateswarlu =

Indian politician

Avudari Venkateswarlu served as an independent Member of the Legislative Assembly for Vinukonda constituency in Andhra Pradesh, India, between 1978 and 1983.
