= Sarpayagam =

1991 film by Paruchuri Brothers

- Theatrical poster
- Directed by: Paruchuri Brothers
- Written by: Paruchuri Brothers
- Produced by: Daggubati Ramnaidu
- Starring: Sobhan Babu; Vani Viswanath; Rekha; Roja Selvamani; Srinivasa Varma; Nutan Prasad; Nagesh; Brahmanandam
- Cinematography: S. Gopal Reddy
- Edited by: K. V. Krishna Reddy; K. Madhav
- Music by: Vidyasagar
- Production company: Suresh Productions
- Release date: 1 November 1991
- Country: India
- Language: Telugu

Sarpayagam (transl. Snake offering) is a 1991 Indian Telugu-language crime drama film written and directed by Paruchuri Brothers starring Sobhan Babu, Vani Viswanath, Rekha and Roja Selvamani in the lead roles. The film bankrolled by D. Ramanaidu under Suresh Productions had musical score by Vidyasagar. Srinivasa Varma, Nagesh, Nutan Prasad and Brahmanandam essayed other major supporting characters. The film, based on true events revolves around a man who becomes a vengeful serial killer after his daughter gets brutally raped. Despite having a limited release, the film turned out to be a box office hit, garnering a positive response from critics and people. Actor Sobhan received acclaim for his portrayal of the revenge seeking father.

== Plot ==
The story begins with Dr. Venu Gopal arriving at Vijayawada railway station and hiring an auto to Swarna Hotel. On his way, he encounters a clash between two gangs, Kali and Bose. He reaches out to the Kali gang for help to murder five people. Suspicious of Venugopal's intentions, Kali follows him to find out more about him. In the hotel room, Venugopal reveals his flashback.

Venugopal once led a happy life with his wife and young daughter, Anupama. On Anupama's birthday, a tragic incident occurred: his wife caught fire and was rushed to the hospital. Venugopal, in the middle of performing surgery on a child, stopped the operation to attend to his wife. However, persuaded by his wife, who reminded him of his duty as a doctor, he resumed the surgery while his wife succumbed to her injuries. He then raised his daughter, taking on the roles of both father and mother.

As time passed, Anupama grew into a beautiful young woman and joined college, where she was assaulted by five of her classmates. Unable to bear the trauma, she committed suicide, but not before writing a letter to her father detailing the horrific events. Upon learning the truth, Venugopal vowed to bury all five perpetrators next to her.

The story shifts back to the present, where Kali, after hearing Venugopal's story, reveals that his brother is one of the five assailants and attempts to kill Venugopal. At the last moment, members of the Bose gang arrive, overpower Kali, and take Venugopal with them, believing Kali to be dead.

Is Kali really dead? How will Venugopal avenge his daughter's death? How will the Bose gang assist him? Will Venugopal face punishment in court? These questions form the rest of the story.

== Cast ==
- Sobhan Babu
- Vani Viswanath
- Rekha
- Roja Selvamani
- Kinneraa
- Srinivasa Varma
- Nagesh
- Nutan Prasad
- Brahmanandam
- Suthi Velu
- Brahmaji
- Raghunatha Reddy
- Raja Ravindra
- P. Sai Kumar
- Honai

== Production ==
Raghunatha Reddy was one amongst ten members of the play Dharmo Rakshita Rakshita staged at the Paruchuri Raghu Babu memorial drama festival to make his debut through this film.

== Soundtrack ==
Vidyasagar scored and composed the film's soundtrack. C. Narayana Reddy penned the lyrics.

- "ABCD Gundelo" sung by S. P. B. and P. Susheela
- "Subhram Cheyna" sung by S. P. B. and P. Susheela
- "Chukka Chukka" sung by S. P. B.
- "Digu Digu Naga" sung by K. S. Chitra
- "Chali Raagam" sung by S. P. B. and K. S. Chitra

== Awards ==
- Roja won Nandi Special Jury Award for performance in this film.
