= Prema Thapassu =

- Movie Poster
- Directed by: Dr. N. Siva Prasad
- Written by: Kulashekar; Rajashekar (dialogues)
- Screenplay by: Dr.N. Siva Prasad
- Story by: Kulashekar; Dr. N. Siva Prasad
- Produced by: G. Venu Gopal
- Starring: Rajendra Prasad; Roja
- Cinematography: N. S. Raju
- Edited by: C. Satish
- Music by: Raja
- Production company: Sri Sai Madhavi Productions
- Release date: 29 July 1991
- Running time: 126 mins
- Country: India
- Language: Telugu

Prema Thapassu is a 1991 Indian Telugu-language romantic drama film directed by Dr. N. Siva Prasad. The film stars Rajendra Prasad and Roja, with music composed by Rajendra Prasad. The film is the debut of actress Roja in the film industry.

== Plot ==
The film is a tale of two divine souls, Rathaiah & Mutyalu, who met in childhood and cohabitated with pure hearts. Rathaiah is imprudent & inept, so Mutyalu labors for their survival. They reside blissfully in a small hut, and Rathaiah's main strength is eternal love for Mutyalu. Besides, another love track of two colleagues, Sagar & Sujatha, goes on. The two are so fond of each other, but the elders split them, and they elope. Later, Sagar loses his charm through a fire accident when Sujatha quits as she puts more emphasis on aesthetic appeal. Parallelly, Rathaiah seeks to gain any post but fails as unskilled. Once, a few drinkers mislead & batter him with one-shot use. Mutyalu retrieves him after a long quest in heavy rain and becomes the toxic fever victim. Rathaiah breaks the temple doors at midnight and fetches saffron to shield Mutyalu. Whereat, the public strikes, misinterpreting him as a thief. He nears Mutyalu bearing it and recoups her with his idolization.

Meanwhile, Kolaiappa, a rogue rickshawala, misbehaves with Mutyalu when Rathaiah pounds him, weaponizing his affection for her. Being begrudged, Kolaiappa tries to molest Mutyalu in Rathaiah's absence when Sivangi, a former dreadful disabled ruffian, secures her. He dramatically cares about Rathaiah & Mutyala, calling them brother-in-law & sister. However, Sinvangi is a cruel spirit who keeps an evil eye on Mutyalu and threatens to make her knit him by putting Rathaiah in a pitfall. Hence, Mutyalu expels Rathaiah for his welfare, mortifying him as futile, and says at least Sivangi can earn by begging to be handicapped. Thus, furious Rathaiah reaches the holy fairy, where he pokes his two eyes before the goddess, proclaiming his adoration for Mutyalu. Following this, Mutyalu lands affirms the actuality and rebukes Sivangi, who too bows down for their unbreakable bond. At last, Rathaiah declares to see the world with Mutyalu's vision from there, which also reforms Sagar & Sujatha's discerning true love's eminence. Finally, the movie ends with Rathaiah moving into the steps of Mutyalu.

== Cast ==
- Rajendra Prasad as Rathaiah
- Roja as Mutyalu
- Pokuri Baba Rao as Sivangi
- Saikumar as Sagar
- Brahmanandam
- Suthi Velu
- Narra Venkateswara Rao
- Vennira Aadai Moorthy
- Hema Sundar as Tata
- Raj Varma as Kolaiappa
- Prasanna Kumar
- Devaki as Sujatha
- Y. Vijaya

== Soundtrack ==
Prema Thapassu

Film score by Raja
- Released: 1991
- Genre: Soundtrack
- Length: 22:58
- Label: SURYA Music
- Producer: Rajendra Prasad

Music composed by Raja. Music released by SURYA Music Company.

No.	Title	Lyrics	Singer(s)	Length
1.	"Aadeshchane Ammi"	N. Siva Prasad	Rajendra Prasad	5:16
2.	"Em Premalo"	N. Siva Prasad	Vandemataram Srinivas, Radhika	3:46
3.	"Emo Enduko"	Vennelakanti	S. P. Balasubrahmanyam, Chitra	4:41
4.	"Ateto Avudha"	Vedavyas	Rajendra Prasad, Radhika	4:59
5.	"Nerama Ghorama"	Vennelakanti	S. P. Balasubrahmanyam	4:16
Total length:				22:58
