= Nagari Assembly constituency =

Constituency of the Andhra Pradesh Legislative Assembly, India

Coordinates: 13.32°N 79.59°E

Nagari
- Constituency No. 170 for the Andhra Pradesh Legislative Assembly
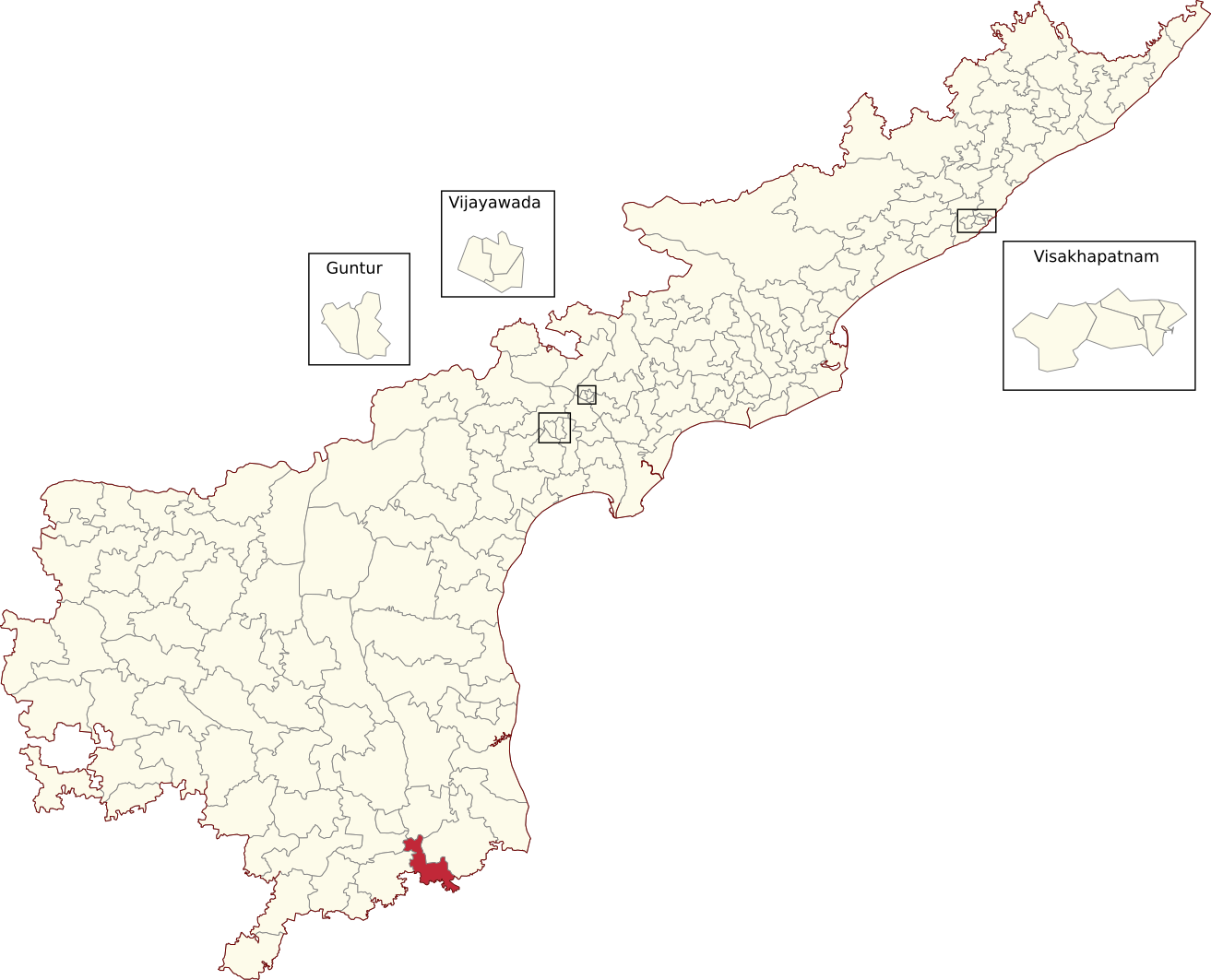
- Location of Nagari Assembly constituency within Andhra Pradesh

Constituency details
- Country: India
- Region: South India
- State: Andhra Pradesh
- District: Chittoor,Tirupati
- Lok Sabha constituency: Chittoor
- Established: 1962
- Total electors: 194,748
- Reservation: None

Member of Legislative Assembly
- 16th Andhra Pradesh Legislative Assembly
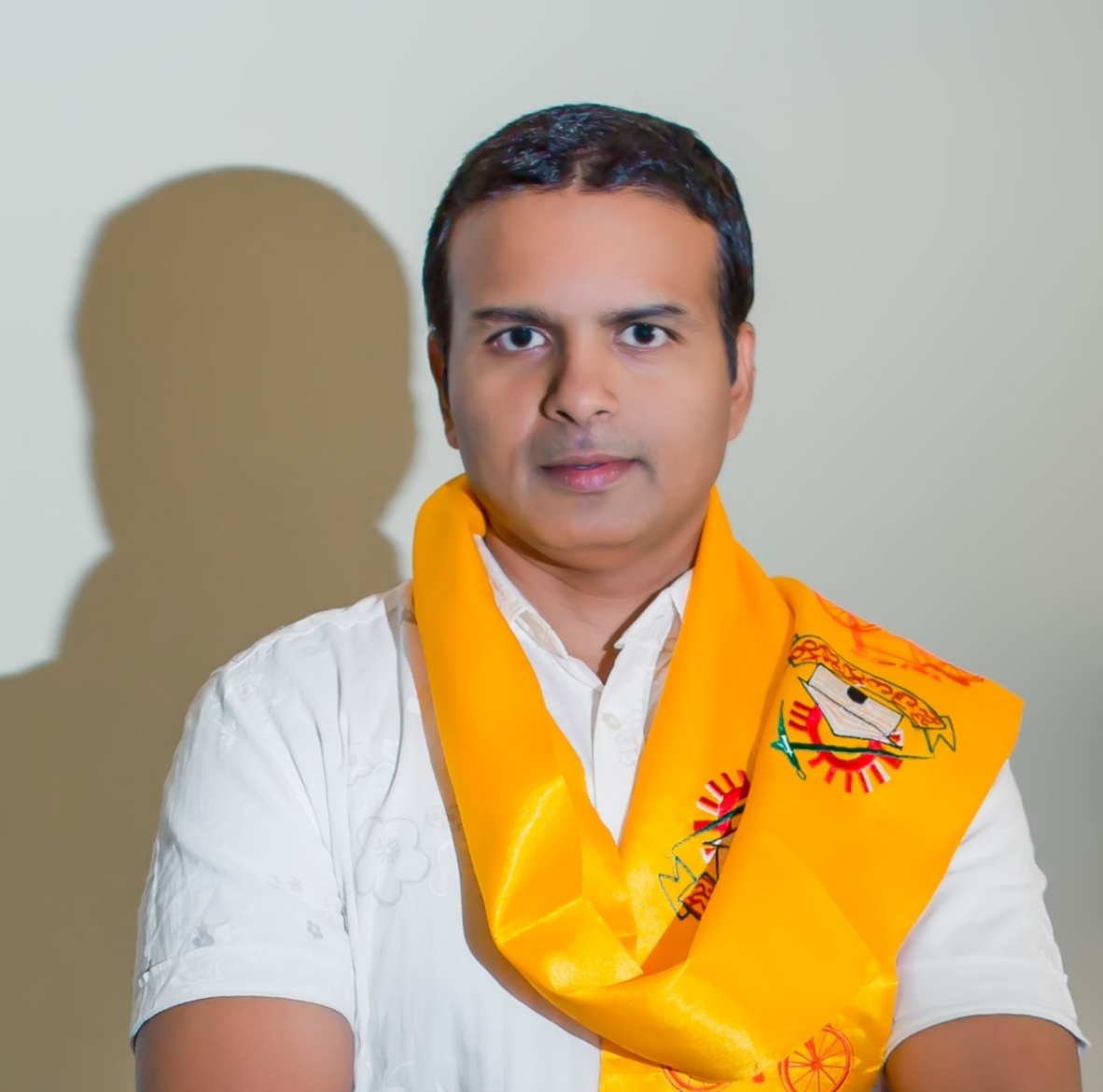
- Incumbent Gali Bhanu Prakash Naidu
- Party: TDP
- Alliance: NDA
- Elected year: 2024

Nagari Assembly constituency is a constituency in Chittoor district and Tirupati district of Andhra Pradesh that elects representatives to the Andhra Pradesh Legislative Assembly in India. It is one of the seven assembly segments of Chittoor Lok Sabha constituency.

Gali Bhanu Prakash is the current MLA of the constituency, having won the 2024 Andhra Pradesh Legislative Assembly election from Telugu Desam Party. As of 2024, there are a total of 178,530 electors in the constituency. The constituency was established in 1962, as per the Delimitation Orders (1962).

== Mandals ==
Presently this constituency consists of the following Mandals as per Delimitation Orders, 2008:

Mandal	District
Nindra	Chittoor
Vijayapuram	Chittoor
Nagari	Chittoor
Puttur	Tirupati
Vadamalapeta	Tirupati

== Members of the Legislative Assembly ==
Year	Member	Party
1962	Dommaraju Gopalu Raju	Independent
1967	Kilari Gopalu Naidu	Indian National Congress
1972	Kilari Gopalu Naidu	Indian National Congress
1978	V Chenga Reddy	Indian National Congress
1983	Elavarthi Gopal Raju	Telugu Desam Party
1985	V Chenga Reddy	Indian National Congress
1989	V Chenga Reddy	Indian National Congress
1994	V. Doraswamy Raju	Telugu Desam Party
1999	Reddyvari Chenga Reddy	Indian National Congress
2004	Reddyvari Chenga Reddy	Indian National Congress
2009	Gali Muddukrishnama Naidu	Telugu Desam Party
2014	R. K. Roja	YSR Congress Party
2019	R. K. Roja	YSR Congress Party
2024	Gali Bhanu Prakash	Telugu Desam Party

== Election results ==
Vote share of winning candidates
1962	51.16%
1967	57.13%
1972	73.83%
1978	39.65%
1983	56.37%
1985	49.78%
1989	56.83%
1994	53.32%
1999	50.28%
2004	50.80%
2009	43.35%
2014	47.23%
2019	47.6%
2024	60.38%

=== 2024 ===
2024 Andhra Pradesh Legislative Assembly election: Nagari
Party	Candidate	Votes	%	±%
TDP	Gali Bhanu Prakash	107,797	60.38	▲14.38
YSRCP	R.K. Roja	62,794	35.17	▼12.43
INC	Pochareddy Rakesh Reddy	4,551	2.55	▲0.56
NOTA	None Of The Above	1,744	0.98	▼0.02
Margin of victory		45,004	25.2	▲23.58
Total valid votes		178,530		
TDP gain from YSRCP		Swing		

=== 2019 ===
2019 Andhra Pradesh Legislative Assembly election: Nagari
Party	Candidate	Votes	%	±%
YSRCP	R. K. Roja	80,333	47.60	
TDP	Gali Bhanu Prakash	77,625	46.00	
INC	Pochareddy Rakesh Reddy	3,357	1.99	
BSP	Naganaboyina Pravallika	3,044	1.80	
NOTA	None of the Above	1,688	1.00	
BJP	Nishidha. M	1,352	0.80	
Majority		2,708	1.60	
Turnout		168,764	86.59	
YSRCP hold		Swing		

=== 2014 ===
2014 Andhra Pradesh Legislative Assembly election: Nagari
Party	Candidate	Votes	%	±%
YSRCP	R. K. Roja	74,724	47.23	New
TDP	Gali Muddu Krishnama Naidu	73,866	46.69	▲3.34
INC	Sathya Swarupa Indira Vakati	5,170	3.27	▼39.15
LSP	Pothugunta Vijaya Babu	1,546	0.98	
Pyramid Party of India	C. Malathi	530	0.34	
JSP	G.Jawahar Ruban	507	0.32	
Independent	A. Chitti Babu	472	0.30	
NOTA	None of the Above	458	0.29	
Independent	K. Dhanasekhar Chetty	327	0.21	
Jai Maha Bharath Party	C. Naga Raveendra Reddy	226	0.14	
Independent	P. Jayaramaiah	147	0.09	
Independent	B. Ramakrishnama Naidu	117	0.07	
Independent	B. Dhilli Babu	111	0.07	
Margin of victory		858	0.54	
Total valid votes		1,57,743		
Rejected ballots				
Turnout		1,58,211	85.25	
Registered electors		1,85,593		
YSRCP gain from TDP		Swing		

=== 2009 ===
2009 Andhra Pradesh Legislative Assembly election: Nagari
Party	Candidate	Votes	%	±%
TDP	Gali Muddukrishnama Naidu	60,849	43.35	
INC	Chenga Reddy	59,541	42.42	
PRP	G. Sudarshana Varma	13,841	9.86	
BSP	J. Venugopal Raju	1,568	1.12	
BJP	N. Sankar Yadav	1,501	1.07	
Independent	B. Ramakrishnama Naidu	1,256	0.89	
LSP	Dr. G. Jawahar Ruban	742	0.53	
Independent	B. Dalli Babu	455	0.32	
Independent	K. Dhanasekhar Chetty	403	0.29	
Bharatheeya Sadharma Samsthapana Party	G. Gunasekhar	207	0.15	
Margin of victory		1,308	0.93	
Total valid votes		1,40,363		
Rejected ballots		241		
Turnout		1,40,604		
Registered electors		1,68,421		83.48
TDP gain from INC		Swing		

=== 2004 ===
2004 Andhra Pradesh Legislative Assembly election: Nagari
Party	Candidate	Votes	%	±%
INC	Chengareddy Reddyvari	65,561	50.80	
TDP	R. K. Roja	59,867	46.39	
Independent	P. Jayaram	1,817	1.40	
Independent	R. Nagandra Yadav	835	0.65	
Independent	B. Ramakrishnama Naidu	983	0.76	
Margin of victory		5,694		
Total valid votes		1,29,063		
Rejected ballots		2		
Turnout		1,29,065	77.36	
Registered electors		1,66,845		
INC hold		Swing		

=== 1999 ===
1999 Andhra Pradesh Legislative Assembly election: Nagari
Party	Candidate	Votes	%	±%
INC	Chenga Reddy Reddyvari	62,592	50.28	
TDP	V. Doraswamy Raju	59,478	47.78	
AIADMK	V. Ambrose Wilson	1,513	1.22	
Anna Telugu Desam Party	K. N. Mohan Modaliar	428	0.34	
Independent	J. Jaleel	315	0.25	
Independent	P. V. Dharmalingam	126	0.10	
Independent	B. Ramakrishnama Naidu	39	0.03	
Margin of victory		3,114	2.50	
Total valid votes		1,24,491		
Rejected ballots		5,697	4.38	
Turnout		1,30,188	73.59	
Registered electors		1,76,911		
INC gain from TDP		Swing		

=== 1994 ===
1994 Andhra Pradesh Legislative Assembly election: Nagari
Party	Candidate	Votes	%	±%
TDP	V. Doraswamy Raju	65,432	53.32	
INC	V. Chenga Reddy	52,327	42.64	
AIADMK	P. Harinathan	3,029	2.47	
BSP	K. Nagaiah	1,010	0.82	
BJP	K. G. Govindaswamy	500	0.41	
Independent	B. Jagannatha Naidu	265	0.22	
Independent	S. S. Balakrishnan	75	0.06	
Independent	A. N. Sampath	73	0.06	
Margin of victory		13,105	10.68	
Total valid votes		1,22,711		
Rejected ballots		2,524	2.01	
Turnout		1,25,294	78.28	
Registered electors		1,60,051		
TDP gain from INC		Swing		

=== 1989 ===
1989 Andhra Pradesh Legislative Assembly election: Nagari
Party	Candidate	Votes	%	±%
INC	Changa Reddy V	66,423	56.83	
BJP	Chilakam Ramakrishnama Reddy	50,248	42.99	
Independent	Bathala Ramakrishnama Naidu	199	0.17	
Margin of victory		16,175	13.84	
Total valid votes		1,16,870		
Rejected ballots		5,078	4.16	
Turnout		1,21,948	74.75	
Registered electors		1,63,132		
INC hold		Swing		

=== 1985 ===
1985 Andhra Pradesh Legislative Assembly election: Nagari
Party	Candidate	Votes	%	±%
INC	Chenga Reddy V	50,646	49.78	
TDP	A. M. Radhakrishna	49,504	48.66	
Independent	Pavuluri Jagannadham Naidu	860	0.85	
Independent	R. Mahadeva Naidu	264	0.26	
Independent	Enamandala Subramanyam Naidu	196	0.19	
Independent	Kalikiri Narayana Reddy	135	0.13	
Independent	R. Subramanyam Reddy	128	0.13	
Margin of victory		1,142	1.12	
Total valid votes		1,01,733		
Rejected ballots		1,742	1.68	
Turnout		1,03,475	74.83	
Registered electors		1,38,281		
INC gain from Independent		Swing		

=== 1983 ===
1983 Andhra Pradesh Legislative Assembly election: Nagari
Party	Candidate	Votes	%	±%
Independent	E. V. Gopal Rraju (Elavarti)	53,778	56.37	
INC	Chengareddy Vellire	41,626	43.63	
Margin of victory		12,152	12.74	
Total valid votes		95,404		
Rejected ballots		1,766	1.82	
Turnout		97,170	80.92	
Registered electors		1,20,077		
Independent gain from INC(I)		Swing		

=== 1978 ===
1978 Andhra Pradesh Legislative Assembly election: Nagari
Party	Candidate	Votes	%	±%
INC(I)	Chenga Reddy Vellired	33,448	39.65	
JP	Ramachandra Reddy Chilakam	25,995	30.82	
INC	Ramesh Chandra Prasad Gandhamaneni	11,031	13.08	
AIADMK	Bhaskar Naidu K.	7,677	9.10	
DMK	Subramanyam Mukali Chittor	6,206	7.36	
Margin of victory		7,453	8.84	
Total valid votes		84,357		
Rejected ballots		2,185	2.52	
Turnout		86,542	77.75	
Registered electors		1,11,305		
INC(I) gain from INC		Swing		

=== 1972 ===
1972 Andhra Pradesh Legislative Assembly election: Nagari
Party	Candidate	Votes	%	±%
INC	Kilari Gopalu Naidu	43,484	73.83	
DMK	Gnanaprakasam	15,412	26.17	
Margin of victory		28,072	47.66	
Total valid votes		58,896		
Rejected ballots		1,832	3.02	
Turnout		60,728	75.79	
Registered electors		80,130		
INC hold		Swing		

=== 1967 ===
1967 Andhra Pradesh Legislative Assembly election: Nagari
Party	Candidate	Votes	%	±%
INC	Kilari Gopalu Naidu	31,292	57.13	
SWA	K. B. Siddaaiah	23,477	42.87	
Margin of victory		7,815	14.27	
Total valid votes		54,769		
Rejected ballots		1,821	3.22	
Turnout		56,590	76.34	
Registered electors		74,125		
INC gain from Independent		Swing		

=== 1962 ===
1962 Andhra Pradesh Legislative Assembly election: Nagari
Party	Candidate	Votes	%	±%
Independent	Dommaraju Gopalu Raju	19,696	51.16	
INC	Kilari Gopalu Naidu	18,159	47.17	
Independent	Raghava Modali	642	1.67	
Margin of victory		1,537	3.99	
Total valid votes		38,497		
Rejected ballots		1,261	3.17	
Turnout		39,758	81.70	
Registered electors		48,662		
Independent win (new seat)				

== See also ==
- List of constituencies of the Andhra Pradesh Legislative Assembly
