= Darshan (Tamil actor) =

Indian Actor

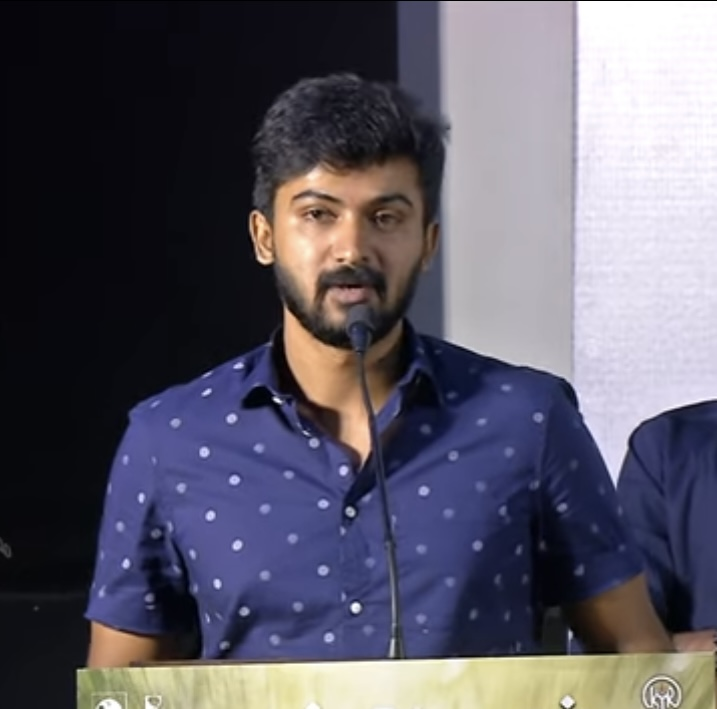
- Darshan in 2019
- Born: 29 April 1991 (age 35); Coonoor, Tamil Nadu, India
- Other name: Dharsan
- Education: CSI Bishop Appasamy College Of Arts And Science
- Occupation: Actor
- Years active: 2015 – present

Darshan (born 29 April 1991) is an Indian actor who appears in Tamil cinema. He made his breakthrough by playing the supporting role in Kanaa (2018) and played one of the leads in Thumbaa (2019). He is also the runner up of the comedy cooking show Cooku with Comali (season 3).

== Early life ==
Darshan was born on 29 April 1991 in Coonoor in the state of Tamil Nadu. He later did his schooling at Stanes Anglo Indian Higher Secondary School, Coonoor, and went to CSI Bishop Appasamy College Of Arts And Science for his college. He later graduated from his studies and decided to go into the film industry full time.

== Career ==
Darshan first made his lead debut under Sivakarthikeyan's productions banner called Kanaa playing a supporting role known as Murali Krishna which was directed by Arunraja Kamaraj. The film overall received a high positive feedback from critics, with Darshan citing Sivakarthikeyan as his mentor thereafter. After his debut, Darshan received an offer from director Harish Ram L. H to play the lead character in his adventure themed film Thumbaa. Darshan later agreed to the offer and was cast in the lead along with Keerthi Pandian and Dheena. In 2022, Darshan appeared as a contestant in the comedy television show called Cooku With Comali which aired on Star Vijay which also marked his television debut.

== Filmography ==
=== Films ===
Year	Title	Role	Notes
2015	Rajinimurugan	Rajini Murugan's younger brother	
2018	Kanaa	Murali Krishna	
2019	Thumbaa	Hari	
2023	Thunivu	Kavin	
2024	Ayalaan	Train passenger	Cameo appearance in the song "Ayalaa Ayalaa"
2025	House Mates	N. Karthik	

=== Other work ===
Year	Title	Role	Notes
2014	Ennai Vidu (transl. Let Me Go)	Yo Yo	short film
2025	Buddy	Madhi	music video

=== Television ===
Year	Show	Role	Channel	Notes	Ref.
2022	Cooku with Comali (season 3)	Contestant	Star Vijay	1st Runner-up	
2023	Kalakka Povathu Yaaru? Champion	Guest	Star Vijay		
2023	Cooku with Comali (season 4)	Guest	Star Vijay	Celebration round	
