= My Perfectt Husband =

- Poster
- Genre: Family drama
- Written by: Thamira
- Directed by: Thamira
- Starring: Sathyaraj; Seetha; J. Livingston; Rekha Harris; Reshma Pasupuleti; Rakshan
- Composer: Vidyasagar
- Country of origin: India
- Original language: Tamil
- No. of seasons: 1
- No. of episodes: 8

Production
- Producers: Mohammed Rasith; Fakrudeen; Kutty
- Cinematography: Arthur A. Wilson
- Editor: Parthasarathy
- Running time: 22-25 minutes
- Production company: Sigaram Cinemas

Original release
- Network: Disney+ Hotstar
- Release: 16 August 2024

My Perfectt Husband is a 2024 Indian Tamil-language family drama television series directed by Thamira (in his last series before his death) for Disney+ Hotstar for its label Hotstar Specials. It is produced by Mohammed Rasith, Fakrudeen and Kutty under the banner of Sigaram Cinemas. It stars Sathyaraj, Seetha, J. Livingston, Rekha Harris, Reshma Pasupuleti, Rakshan, Varsha Bollamma and Aajeedh Khalique.

The series' story centers around a perfectly, imperfect husband. It premiered on Disney+ Hotstar on 16 August 2024 and consists of eight episodes.

== Cast ==
- Sathyaraj as Bharathi
- Seetha as Saraswathi
- J. Livingston as Subramani
- Rekha Harris as Bharathi
- Reshma Pasupuleti as Vimala "Vimal"
- Varsha Bollamma as Deepika
- Rakshan as Vaseegaran
- Aajeedh Khalique as Ilaiyaraaja
- RJ Raghvi as Kavinmalar
- Gayathri Yuvaraj as Mary

== Development ==
=== Production ===
The series was announced by Disney+ Hotstar in 2021. The series is directed by filmmaker Thamira, known for his films like Rettaisuzhi (2010) and Aan Devathai (2018). The music for the series was composed by Vidyasagar. The cinematography was handled by Arthur A. Wilson, editing by Parthasarathy.

=== Casting ===
Tamil veteran actor Sathyaraj was cast main role. This is his Tamil first role in a limited series. Actress Seetha, Rekha Harris and Reshma Pasupuleti was cast as female lead. Varsha Bollamma and Rakshan will also be playing a prominent role in the project.

=== Release ===
It was announced in December 2021 and the series will be released on Disney+ Hotstar, but due to COVID-19 lockdowns the series was postponed. The first look poster was released on 4 August 2024, the poster features the characters.
