= Akkenam =

- Theatrical release poster
- Directed by: Uday K
- Written by: Uday K
- Produced by: Arun Pandian
- Starring: Keerthi Pandian; Arun Pandian; Adithya Shivpink
- Cinematography: Vignesh Govindarajan
- Edited by: Devathyan
- Music by: Barath Veeraraghavan
- Production companies: A & P Groups
- Distributed by: Ayngaran International
- Release date: 4 July 2025
- Country: India
- Language: Tamil

Akkenam is a 2025 Indian Tamil-language action thriller film written and directed by Uday K and produced by Arun Pandian's A & P Groups, starring himself, Keerthi Pandian and Adithya Shivpink in the lead roles. It marks the reunion of Keerthi and Arun the real life father daughter combo after their previous collaboration, Anbirkiniyal (2021).

Akkenam released in theatres on 4 July 2025 worldwide.

== Cast ==
- Keerthi Pandian as Indira
- Arun Pandian as Pandian
- Adithya Shivpink as Sara
- Adithya Menon as Dada
- Praveen Raja as Ram
- Ramesh Thilak as Rathnam
- Seetha as Indira's mother
- Prem Kumar as Inspector Azad
- G. M. Sundar as Deva

== Production ==
On 18 February 2025, it was announced that Keerthi Pandian is set to share screenspace along with her father Arun Pandian, after Anbirkiniyal (2021) in a film directed by Uday K. The film was titled Akkenam symbolizing Tamil-vowel Aayudha Ezhuthu, as the film revolves around three characters played by Keerthi, Arun Pandian and Adithya Shivpink. The film is produced by Arun Pandian under his A & P Groups banner and the star cast includes Adithya Menon, Ramesh Thilak, Seetha, G. M. Sundar and others in key roles. The technical team consists of cinematographer Vignesh Govindarajan, music composer Barath Veeraraghavan, editor Devathyan, art director Raja, stunt director PC Stunts and renowned Odissi instructor Gangadhar Nayak and his team was roped in to perform for a song.

Principal photography took place across Tamil Nadu, Pondicherry and North India.

== Music ==
Akkenam

Soundtrack album by Barath Veeraraghavan
- Genre: Feature film soundtrack
- Language: Tamil
- Label: Divo Music
- Producer: Barath Veeraraghavan

Singles from Akkenam
- 1. "Mellali Mellali" Released: 20 February 2025

The music is composed by Barath Veeraraghavan. The first single "Mellali Mellali" released on 20 February 2025. The title track was released on 10 March 2025. The pre-release audio launch event was conducted in Chennai on 14 June 2025.

Track listing
No.	Title	Lyrics	Singer(s)	Length
1.	"Akkenam - Title Track"	Chandy	Barath Veeraraghavan, Driya Pandian, Dacalty
2.	"Mellali Mellali"	Karthik Netha	Pradeep Kumar, Aishwerya Radhakrishnan	3:54

== Release ==
Akkenam released in theatres on 4 July 2025 worldwide.

== Critical reception ==
Roopa Radhakrishnan of The Times of India gave 2.5/5 stars and wrote "Akkenam attempts to build a layered narrative, but it is diluted by the lack of character depth, amateurish staging, and no real payoff. Therefore, the film ends up being uneven and emotionally distant." Arunkumar of Maalai Malar gave the same rating, praising the cast performances, cinematography and background score but criticising the screenplay.
