= Singapore Saloon =

- Theatrical release poster
- Directed by: Gokul
- Written by: Gokul
- Produced by: Ishari K. Ganesh
- Starring: RJ Balaji; Meenakshi Chaudhary
- Cinematography: M. Sukumar
- Edited by: Selva R. K.
- Music by: Songs: Vivek–Mervin; Score: Javed Riaz
- Production company: Vels Films International
- Distributed by: Red Giant Movies
- Release date: 25 January 2024
- Country: India
- Language: Tamil

Singapore Saloon is a 2024 Indian Tamil-language coming-of-age film written and directed by Gokul, and produced by Ishari K. Ganesh under Vels Films International. The film stars RJ Balaji and Meenakshi Chaudhary in the lead role, alongside Sathyaraj, Lal, Kishen Das, Ann Sheetal, Thalaivasal Vijay, John Vijay and Robo Shankar.

The film was officially announced in November 2022 under the official title Singapore Saloon. Principal photography commenced early that year. It was predominantly shot in Chennai and wrapped by mid-December 2022, while additional photography was done in May 2023. The film has music composed by Vivek–Mervin, background score composed by Javed Riaz, cinematography handled by M. Sukumar and editing by Selva RK.

Singapore Saloon was released on 25 January 2024 to mixed reviews from critics.

== Plot ==
Kathir, a professional barber, feels suicidal inside his saloon. He drops some sleeping pills into his alcoholic drink. He then recalls his past.

Past: Kathir and Basheer are best friends in Tenkasi. The village had a barber, Chacha, who owned a saloon, Singapore Saloon. At a young age, Kathir was angry at him after he made his head bald and circumcised Basheer. After a while, Kathir grows fond of Chacha's techniques and becomes friends with him. In tenth grade, Kathir falls in love with Nilavathi, the daughter of one of Chacha's customers. When Nila's father finds out the father and daughter leave town, and Chacha reprimands Kathir. Chacha decides to teach Kathir the tricks of the trade.

In 12th grade, Chacha eventually leaves town, but Chacha leaves his box with Kathir. His father motivates him to go to college and study so he can mature. So, both Kathir and Basheer go to college. Kathir falls in love with Nilarathi, and Nilarathi reciprocates after Kathir helps style her hair for a play. However, Kathir rejects a job offer from a successful company because of his passion for becoming a hairstylist. Nilarathi calls Kathir and his father. However, Nilarathi rejects a marriage proposal between herself and Kathir because of Kathir's profession. Kathir then gets a job at Wink Saloon, which Anoop Menon, a famous hairstylist, owns. Basheer marries his college girlfriend, Haseena. One day, when Suresh Chandra Menon visits the saloon, he sees Kathir's haircutting style and decides to get a haircut from him. Anoop sees Menon's impressive hairstyle. Anoop is impressed by Kathir and decides to promote him to a senior stylist with a 50K salary.

Kathir eventually marries Nilavoliyal, his college junior, who is impressed at his hairstyling. He decides to buy a property for a new saloon, but Basheer's friend says it costs 3.5 crores. His father decided to sell the house for 0.5 crores, but his father-in-law is only willing to provide 300 rupees for the purchase. After some comedic incidents, Chakrapani, in a drunken state, rewrites the cheque for three crores for Kathir to buy the place. Chakrapani eventually realises what he did the following day.

Eventually, the construction of the saloon and the interior design were completed. Anoop visits Chakrapani and decides to buy the saloon for six crores. However, after Nila reveals the news to Kathir, he says he is unwilling to sell his identity. Chakrapani overhears the conversation and feels guilty. However, one rainy day, Ragavan, Basheer, and Kathir witness the new-build flats crumble and fall in front of their eyes. The slum people moved into Kathir's land after the floods, which affected their village. A few weeks later, the financier threatens Kathir's friends and family to give the money, so Haseena offers jewels. However, Kathir gets pickpocketed.

Present: As Kathir is about to drink the alcohol, a guy appears at the door, introducing himself as Thiruvannamalai, appears at the door and motivates him that his saloon is a landmark and should make people come to him. He also reminds him there used to be a banyan tree full of parrots on the land where the saloon stands, so he says to feed the parrots. Kathir decides to motivate some talented boys near his saloon to become successful. They get a trim from Kathir and enter a dance competition adopting the name Singapore Saloon Gang. Word spreads about Kathir's saloon, and Singapore Saloon becomes the talk of the city, even getting support from Lokesh Kanagaraj. Anoop visits Chakrapani with a blank cheque, but Chakrapani refuses Anoop's offer since no one will sell their identity.

On the day of the dance finals, the court decided to demolish Singapore Saloon over fears it might crumble like the flats. However, Kathir's perseverance, the parrots flocking to the saloon and support from the city people, including Lokesh and Jiiva, lead to the Singapore Saloon gang winning the dance finals and a halt in the demolition of Singapore Saloon. A few months later, the Singapore external affairs minister visited to inaugurate the Singapore Saloon opening, and Chacha also visited the saloon's opening. Kathir and Basheer see him, and they have an emotional reunion. The film ends with Chacha seeing the old box and giving Kathir a haircut.

== Cast ==
- RJ Balaji as Kathir
  - Videsh Anand as young Kathir
- Meenakshi Chaudhary as Nila aka Nilavoliyal
- Sathyaraj as Chakrapani, Nila's father
- Lal as Chacha
- Kishen Das as Basheer, Kathir's close friend
- Ann Sheetal as Nilarathi
- Thalaivasal Vijay as Kathir's father
- John Vijay as Anoop Menon, Kathir's former employer
- Diksha Raagavendran as Nilavathy
- N. Balamurugan as Nilavathy's father
- Chinni Jayanth as barber in Anoop Menon's saloon
- Suresh Chandra Menon as Anoop Menon's customer
- Robo Shankar as Shami/Ragavan, Chakrapani's elder son-in-law
- Y. G. Mahendran a Vichu, Chakrapani's friend
- Imman Annachi as Asirvadham Ayya, tuition teacher
- Indumathy as Kathir's mother
- Akalya Venkatesan as Nilavoliyal’s sister
- Vinoth Munna as Financier (Note: Despite being unnamed in the film, he is listed in the credits as "Vasudev Menon".)
- Kumar Natarajan as Anoop Menon's father
- Daniel Annie Pope as Heads Up Dance Challenge show anchor
- Gnana Prasad as Rap boy
- Daffe Naveen as Dancer
- Kaaka Muttai Shanthi Mani as Slum dweller
- Mohamed Kuraishi as College student (uncredited)
- Arvind Swamy As Thiruvannamalai in a cameo appearance
- Lokesh Kanagaraj as himself in a cameo appearance
- Jiiva as himself in a cameo appearance
- M. K. Stalin as himself (archival footage)

== Production ==
In August 2022, it was reported that director Gokul, who was working on the sequel for Idharkuthane Aasaipattai Balakumara (2013), titled Corona Kumar and starring Silambarasan, would begin working on a new project starring RJ Balaji, as Corona Kumar reportedly got shelved. On 10 November, the project, with the official title Singapore Saloon, was officially announced by Ishari K. Ganesh's production house Vels Films International LTD. Balaji stated that he received the offer to star in the film while filming for Run Baby Run (2023). He further revealed that, for his role, he trained with hairdressers for a month-and-a-half. In late March 2023, Lokesh Kanagaraj, who has been a close friend with Balaji, and Jiiva, who worked with Balaji in Kavalai Vendam (2016), were announced to play cameo appearances in the film. Principal photography commenced in early‐2022. It was predominantly shot in Chennai and wrapped by 18 December that year. Additional photography took place in May 2023, when Lokesh's sequences were filmed.

== Music ==
The music is composed by the composer duo Vivek–Mervin, and background score by Javed Riaz. While marking both the duos' and Riaz's maiden collaboration with Balaji, it also marks the duo's maiden collaboration with Gokul while collaborating with composer Riaz for the second time after Anbirkiniyal.

Track listing
| No. | Title | Lyrics | Singer(s) | Length |
|---|---|---|---|---|
| 1. | "Paal Veedhiyil" | Uma Devi | Vivek-Mervin, Ravi G | 4:26 |
| 2. | "Vandha Mala" | Arivu | Arivu, Vivek Siva, Mervin Solomon | 3:22 |
| Total length: | | | | 7:48 |

== Release ==
Singapore Saloon was released worldwide on 25 January 2024 in theatres.

=== Reception ===
A critic from The Times of India rated the film 2 1/2 out of 5 and wrote that "Gokul's attempt at magical realism, involving a surprise cameo from a star, who appears at the protagonist's doorstep, and a flock of parrots, works to an extent. The director also gives a new spin to scenarios that we have seen before". A critic from Cinema Express gave the film the same rating and wrote that "The problem isn’t that these ideas aren’t good. The film does mean well and stands for sensible causes, but after the hilarity of the first half, it just feels difficult and wholly unnecessary to settle for a passable second half that hurtles through familiar roads to get to expected destinations". A critic from The Hindu wrote that "What’s more astonishing is how RJ Balaji, in the name of taking a back seat, gets very little to do. Apart from being the character we follow and the narrator, Kathir gets thrown around because of circumstances and when he finally wins, they don’t resonate with us". A critic from Hindustan Times wrote that "The storyline of making hairstyling a noble profession and hairstylists as people, who deserve respect is good. But director Gokul has tried to bring together too many elements in Singapore Saloon and this is, sadly, its downfall". A critic from OTTplay rated the film 2 1/2 out of 5 and wrote that "Singapore Saloon would have made up for a great comedy, given how the director gave one of best comedies of modern Tamil cinema through Idharkuthane Aasaipattai Balakumara. But the genre shift negates the genuine laughs the first hour of the film soaked you with".

=== Home media ===
Amazon Prime Video acquired the streaming rights for the film which began streaming there from 23 February 2024.
