= Thamira =

Indian film director and screenwriter (1968–2021)

- Born: January 1968; Moolakaraipatti, Thirunelveli
- Died: 27 April 2021 (aged 53); Chennai, Tamil Nadu
- Occupation: Film director Screenwriter

Thamira (January 1968 – 27 April 2021) was an Indian film director, screenwriter and film producer active in Tamil cinema.

== Life ==
He began his career by assisting filmmakers K. Balachander and Bharathiraja. He made his directorial debut in 2010 with Rettaisuzhi, and cast both his mentors in the film in important roles.

Thamira's second movie was Aan Devathai in 2018, that starred Samuthirakani, Ramya Pandian, Kavin, and Monica. His next project was the series My Perfect Husband, featuring Sathyaraj and Seetha, that was set to release on Disney+ Hotstar.

== Death ==
Thamira died on 27 April 2021 after suffering from COVID-19 complications at a private hospital in Chennai. He was 53.

== Filmography ==
Year	Film	Director	Writer	Notes
2006	Poi	No	Dialogues	
2010	Rettaisuzhi	Yes	Yes	
2018	Aan Devathai	Yes	Yes	
2024	My Perfect Husband	Yes	Yes	Series
