= Aan Devathai =

2018 Indian Tamil family drama film

Aan Dhevathai
- Poster
- Directed by: Thamira
- Written by: Thamira
- Produced by: Fakrudeen
- Starring: Samuthirakani; Ramya Pandian; Kavin; Monica
- Cinematography: Vijay Milton
- Edited by: Kasi Viswanathan
- Music by: Ghibran
- Production company: Sigaram Cinemas
- Release date: 12 October 2018
- Running time: 115 minutes
- Country: India
- Language: Tamil
- Box office: ₹18 crore

Aan Dhevathai (transl. Male Angel) is a 2018 Indian Tamil-language family drama film written and directed by Thamira. The film stars Samuthirakani, Ramya Pandian, Kavin, and Monica, while Radha Ravi, Ilavarasu, Kaali Venkat, Abhishek Vinod, Hareesh Peradi, and Suja Varunee play pivotal and supporting roles. The film has music composed by Ghibran, cinematography by Vijay Milton, and editing by Kasi Viswanathan. The venture began production in September 2017 and was released on 12 October 2018 to average reviews from critics.

== Plot ==
Elango (Samuthirakani) falls in love with Jessy (Ramya Pandian), and both get married. Elango is employed as a medical sales representative, and neither of them has any parents or relatives. Jessy secures a software job, and life runs smoothly. They are gifted with twins: Agaran (Kavin) and Aathira (Monica). Jessy is more career-oriented, aspiring to achieve greater heights. Elango, on the other hand, views family as their top priority and feels that they are unable to spend quality time with their children. As Jessy earns more than Elango, the latter decides to quit his job and stay at home taking care of their children and household activities. Jessy is against this decision as she dreams of leading a luxurious life if both could earn.

Jessy is impressed to see her colleague Belita (Suja Varunee), who leads a lavish lifestyle, owning a villa and a BMW. Much against Elango's advice, Jessy books an apartment that is under construction. She also buys a BMW, despite Elango's warning her about the problems associated with increased bank loans and EMI. Roy (Abhishek Vinod) is Jessy's boss who has an eye on her. Arguments frequently arise between Elango and Jessy, leading to Elango leaving the house as Jessy keeps insulting him for being a stay-at-home father. Aathira also goes out with Elango, while Agaran stays with Jessy. Elango finds shelter with the help of Bullet Thatha (Radha Ravi), a kindhearted man who meets Agaran once in a while. Elango also secures a job as a waiter in a restaurant. Seeing Elango's cooking skills, the restaurant owner promotes him to chef.

To Jessy's shock, Belita commits suicide as she felt humiliated by a few goons who were employed by the bank to recover her unpaid loans. Jessy realizes the problems associated with too many bank loans. Roy tries to enter into a physical relationship with Jessy, but she does not cooperate, leading him to fire her. Jessy is devastated as she has lost her job and can not pay her EMIs. Jessy misses her EMI payments, and goons arrive at Jessy's home to recover loans. Knowing this, Elango arrives and asks the goons for some time to repay the loans. Elango settles some money with the restaurant owner's help. Jessy realizes her mistake, leading to her transformation, and understands Elango. They both patch up, and Elango starts going to work again, thereby leading a humble but joyful life. They sell their posh apartment, pay off the bank loan, and return to their earlier apartment for rent.

== Cast ==
- Samuthirakani as Elango
- Ramya Pandian as Jessica aka Jessy
- Kavin as Agaran Muthalvan
- Monica as Aathira
- Radha Ravi as Bullet Thatha
- Ilavarasu as Solvilangum Perumal
- Kaali Venkat as Kaali
- Abhishek Vinod as Roy
- Hareesh Peradi as Samuel
- Suja Varunee as Belita voice given by Devi priya
- Prajin as James
- E. Ramdoss as Travelling Ticket Examiner
- S. S. Stanley as Secretary of Apartment Owners Association
- Anupama Kumar as Lakshmi
- K. S. G. Venkatesh as Zaitoon Restaurant Owner
- Aranthangi Nisha as Aranthangi Nisha
- Poraali Dileepan as Kumarappa
- Mohan as Police Constable
- Srinika as Selvi
- Nilani as Maami

== Production ==
The film was announced and began production during September 2017, with director Thamira making a comeback to films after previously making Rettaisuzhi (2010). He also announced he would produce the film under the newly launched Sigaram Cinemas, while Samuthirakani and Joker fame Ramya Pandiyan were selected to play the lead roles. Vijay Milton and Ghibran were consequently selected to be the cinematographer and music composer for the project. Aan Devathai was revealed to revolve around the impact of globalisation, marital relationships and the challenges of raising a kid in the modern times.

== Soundtrack ==
The soundtrack was composed by Ghibran.

Aan Devathai

Soundtrack album by Ghibran
- Released: 2018
- Recorded: 2018
- Genre: Feature film soundtrack
- Length: 16:02
- Language: Tamil
- Producer: Ghibran

Ghibran chronology
Vishwaroopam 2 (2018)	Aan Devathai (2018)	Raatchasan (2018)

No.	Song	Singers	Lyrics	Length (m:ss)
1	"Nigara Than Nigara"	Vineeth Sreenivasan	Soundararajan K	4:05
2	"Malarin Narumanam" - S. Riyaz, Yazin Nizar, Aravind Srinivas	Kaviko	3:31	
3	"Pesugindren"	Chaitra Ambadipudi	Karthick Netha	3:27
4	"Rottu Kadai Party"	Jacqueline Mary, Gold Devaraj	Viveka	3:09
5	"Aan Devathai Theme"	Instrumental	Ghibran	1:50

== Release ==
The film which was initially slated to release in August was released in October 2018. The satellite rights of the film were sold to Zee Tamil.

== Critical reception ==
Times of India wrote "Though this family drama has a tried-and-tested screenplay, with only a few engaging scenes, it is less preachy when compared to some of Samuthirakani’s earlier films." Deccan Chronicle called it "Just an average drama". India Today wrote "Thamira's tries to address the struggles of nuclear families in the fast-paced urban society, but like his one-dimensional characters, the solution he arrives at is also shallow and problematic."
