= Keerthi Pandiyan =

Indian actress (born 1992)

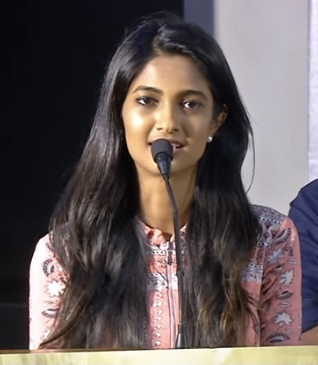
- Keerthi in 2019
- Born: 18 February 1992 (age 34); Chennai, Tamil Nadu, India
- Education: Chettinad Vidyashram
- Occupations: Actress; dancer
- Years active: 2015–present
- Spouse: Ashok Selvan (m. 2023)
- Father: Arun Pandian
- Relatives: Ramya Pandian (cousin)

Keerthi Pandiyan (born 18 February 1992) is an Indian actress who predominantly works in Tamil films. After a brief career as a dancer and theatre actress, she made her film acting debut in 2019 with Thumbaa. She then garnered critical acclaim for her performance in the survival thriller film Anbirkiniyal directed by Gokul. She is the daughter of actor and politician Arun Pandian and the cousin of actress Ramya Pandian.

== Early life ==
Keerthi Pandiyan was born on 18 February 1992 in Chennai, Tamil Nadu to actor and politician Arun Pandian, and his wife Vijaya Pandian. She has two elder sisters named Kavitha Pandian and Kirana Pandian, and a cousin Ramya Pandian, who is also an actress. Keerthi did her schooling at Chettinad Vidyashram in Chennai where she also graduated from.

== Career ==
After graduating, Pandiyan began her career as a dancer in ballet and salsa, then shifted to theatre acting in 2015. She was also the head director of operations in A&P Groups, a film distribution company owned by her father and worked for films such as Savaale Samaali (2015) while simultaneously running her own distribution company in Singapore. Pandiyan initially did not receive many film offers by directors at the start of her appearance in the industry due to discrimination towards her skin color and her being underweight. She even declined others because she felt she did not have meaty roles in them; during auditions, she always introduced herself simply by her first name to avoid the appearance of nepotism as Arun Pandiyan's daughter.

Pandiyan was approached by director Harish Ram offering her a lead role in the film Thumbaa (2019); she accepted, making her debut film as an actress in Tamil cinema. Pandian later acted in Anbirkiniyal (2021), a remake of the Malayalam film Helen (2019), as the main character alongside her father. She also acted in the comedy miniseries Postman which was released on ZEE5. Pandian also won the Super daughter award by Femina which was awarded to her by her father in 2019 after her debut film appearance in Thumbaa. In 2023, she appeared in Kannagi, and the following year in Blue Star, and the much-delayed Konjam Pesinaal Yenna.

== Personal life ==
Pandiyan's niece Driya portrayed the younger version of her character in Anbirkiniyal. In early 2020 during the first COVID-19 lockdown in India period, Pandian developed an interest in farming and helping crops grow for better produce in the future in her gated property. She also knows fire eating.

On 13 September 2023,Keerthi Pandiyan married actor Ashok Selvan in Tirunelveli. They co-starred in Blue Star.

== Filmography ==
=== Films ===
Key
†	Denotes films that have not yet been released

Year	Film	Role	Notes
2019	Thumbaa	Varsha Kumaran	
2021	Anbirkiniyal	Anbirkiniyal Sivam (Anbu)	
2023	Kannagi	Kannagi	
2024	Blue Star	Anandhi	
2024	Konjam Pesinaal Yenna	Sanjana	
2025	Akkenam	Indira	

=== Television ===
Year	Film	Role	Streaming channel
2019	Postman	Ragini	ZEE5

== Accolades ==
Year	Award	Category	Film	Result	Ref.
2019	Femina Awards	Femina Super Daughter	Thumbaa	Won	
2021	Zee Cine Awards Tamil	Best Female Debut	Thumbaa	Nominated	
2021	Vikatan Awards	Best Female Debut	Thumbaa	Nominated	
2021	Edison Awards	Best Female Debut	Thumbaa	Nominated	
2022	SIIMA	Best Actress Award Tamil	Anbirkiniyal	Nominated	
