= Devan (film) =

2002 film by C. Arunpandian

- Poster
- Directed by: Arun Pandian
- Written by: Arun Pandian
- Produced by: Arun Pandian
- Starring: Vijayakanth; Karthik; Arun Pandian; Meena; Kausalya; Vivek; Sai Kumar
- Cinematography: P. Selvakumar
- Edited by: B. S. Vasu; Saleem
- Music by: Ilaiyaraaja
- Production company: Friends Creations
- Release date: 14 June 2002
- Running time: 175 minutes
- Country: India
- Language: Tamil

Devan is a 2002 Indian Tamil-language action film written and directed by Arun Pandian marking his debut as a director. The film stars himself in the title role being his 50th project as an actor with Meena and an ensemble supporting cast including Vivek and Sai Kumar, while actors Vijayakanth, Karthik and Kausalya appeared in extended cameo roles. Sai Kumar made his Tamil debut with this film. The music was composed by Ilaiyaraaja. The film was released on 14 June 2002.

== Plot ==
The film opens with Alex Devan murdering photographer Jeeva in cold blood in the latter's house. Jeeva strategically positions a video camera to capture the impending murder, but Devan's face is not captured on it. Jeeva shouts out the name of his killer before dying, but the audio is lost at that point.

While the police search for the killer, Devan zeroes in on Chetta Raghu as his next target. He follows Chetta to Chandigarh but is apprehended by CBI officer Rathnavel. Rathnavel is a tasked with bringing down hoarders and black marketers of India's staple grains. Once Rathnavel realises that Chetta is a mastermind of the hoarding operation, he begins to help Devan, even hiring successful lawyer Chakravarthy to fight for him.

The flashback shows that Devan's sister Jacqueline was killed by Chetta. Earlier, Chetta and Devan were friends, but Chetta stalks and harasses Jacqueline. He peeps on her when she is bathing, and when she finds out about it, she slaps him in public. Chetta decides to take revenge. On Jacqueline's wedding day, he drugs her and sends her to church in the bridal costume with no dress underneath. Chetta then grabs her costume from the car, thus rendering her completely naked in public. He then shoots her and her groom. Devan is framed for the crime and wants to avenge his sister's death.

In the end, Chetta is killed.

== Cast ==
- Vijayakanth as Rathnavel IPS, Deputy Director CBI (Extended Cameo)
- Karthik as Lawyer Chakravarthy (Extended Cameo)
- Arun Pandian as Alex Devan
- Meena as Uma
- Kausalya as Jacqueline, Devan's sister (Extended Cameo)
- Vivek as Saravanan
- Sai Kumar as Chetta Raghu
- Ranganath as Police commissioner
- Chandrasekhar as Chandran (guest appearance)
- Senthil as Police officer (guest appearance)
- Vijayan as the Police inspector
- Thalaivasal Vijay as Jeeva (guest appearance)
- Pandu as Kaalimuthu
- Vinu Chakravarthy as Politician
- Karikalan as Inspector Ravikumar
- Ajay Rathnam as Police Officer
- Rajmohan as Shiva
- Nandha as Nandha
- Mohan Raman as Public Prosecutor Anantharaman
- Bayilvan Ranganathan as Parrot astrologer
- Kovai Senthil as a Company worker
- Marthandan as a Company worker
- Citizen Mani as Mani
- Boys Rajan as Travel agent
- Mudhalvan Rajendran as the Police inspector
- Srilatha as a Company worker
- Minnal Deepa as Bhavana

== Production ==
The film was Arun Pandian's 50th film as actor and debut film as director. The climax scene was shot in Kakinada, Andhra Pradesh, at the harbour, where underwater sequences were shot, using helicopters and ships, 3000 tractors, 50 buses, and 200 camels. Says Arun Pandian, "It's a story that I penned about 10 years back. Earlier when I casually talked to Vijayakanth about my intention of directing a film he had said that he would definitely act whenever I directed it. I reminded him of it and he promptly agreed. He was confident and didn't have any apprehension that I being the actor-director would give more footage to myself!". Vijayakanth made a special appearance, and charged no remuneration for doing so.

== Soundtrack ==
The soundtrack and background score were composed by music director Ilaiyaraaja.

No.	Song	Singers	Lyrics
1	"Intha Ezhai Geetham"	Ilaiyaraaja	Palani Bharathi
2	"Kanda Kanda Pasanga"	S. N. Surendar, P. Unnikrishnan	Palani Bharathi
3	"Sexy Bomb"	Mathangi, Ganga, Viji Manuel	Palani Bharathi
4	"Teenagela"	Mathangi, Febi Mani	Palani Bharathi
5	"Thaalaattum Kaatre"	Sujatha, Hariharan	Palani Bharathi
6	"Thaalaattum Kaatre"	Ilaiyaraaja	Palani Bharathi

== Release and reception ==
A reviewer wrote:"An interesting screenplay, with suspense, action, vendetta and patriotism weaved in, the male characters are well-etched, and the female characters given just enough scope to justify their presence in the film. Only that the film is a bit too lengthy and could have been trimmed a little". Chennaionline.com wrote "‘Devan’ is an impressive debut by actor-turned-director Arun Pandian". The Hindu wrote "There is a laudable theme that has been touched upon and, of course, plenty of action. Probably proper pruning and crisp narration would have done "Devan" a world of good". Cinesouth wrote "Story, Screenplay, Produced and Directed by- Arun Pandian. He had done a good job as he blended suspense and realistic screenplay very well initially, but as soon as Vijayakanth makes his entry, Arun Pandian begins to lose his grip on the screenplay. Even a newborn could easily predict the next step that he intends to take when the court releases him. The screenplay is so predictable and routine. However, all these drawbacks are very well covered up by the excellent performances by the lead artists and the magnificent cinematography of Selvakumar. These two factors have together rescued 'Devan' from being an utter disaster".

The film was dubbed in Telugu as Mass with Srihari replacing Karthik.
