= P. Jayadevi =

Indian film director and screenwriter (died 2023)

P. Jayadevi (Born in 1958 and died 4 October 2023) was an Indian film director, producer, screenwriter and actress who worked on Tamil films. Regarded as one of the first female directors in the Tamil film industry, Jayadevi was predominantly active in the 1980s and 1990s.

== Career ==
Having begun her career as a theatre artist, Jayadevi began acting in films aged 20 and initially nursed ambitions of becoming a director. She appeared as an actress in over 40 films, before working as a producer and director, and introducing technicians such as P. C. Sreeram and Velu Prabhakaran through her ventures.

Jayadevi first worked as a director in Nalam Nalamariya Aaval (1984), and subsequently went on to make more films throughout the 1980s and 1990s.

In 2000, she worked as a writer on Puratchikkaaran, a script based on the teachings of Periyar and his book entitled Kadavul. The film's controversial theme prompted publicity prior to release, with Jayadevi's work on the film's dialogues being praised. She started making Power of Women (2005) in 2001 but the film had a delayed release following production trouble. The film starred Hariharan and Khushbu in the lead roles, with a reviewer from the AllIndianSite labelling the film as "below average", noting that "Jayadevi's story is initially strong", but "the last few scenes are unpardonably slow and didactic" and that the "screenplay meanders through undulating terrain".

In 2010, Jayadevi began work on Aananda Leelai, a film about fake godmen and their women devotees. She approached Khushbu and Suhasini to play the key roles, but the project did not develop into production. She announced her intentions of directing a film during 2018.

== Personal life and death ==
Jayadevi was previously married to film director Velu Prabhakaran. She died on 4 October 2023.

== Partial filmography ==
Year	Film	Credited for				Notes	Ref.
Year	Film	Writer	Director	Actor	Producer	Notes	Ref.
1976	Idhaya Malar			Yes			
1977	Sainthadamma Sainthadu			Yes			
1978	Ananda Bairavi			Yes			
1978	Vaazha Ninaithaal Vaazhalaam			Yes			
1980	Matravai Neril			Yes	Yes		
1982	Anu			Yes			
1981	Vaa Indha Pakkam				Yes		
1982	Nandri Meendum Varuga			Yes	Yes		
1983	Oru Pullaanguzhal Adupoothugirathu			Yes	Yes		
1984	Nalam Nalamariya Aaval	Yes	Yes		Yes		
1985	Vilaangu Meen	Yes	Yes		Yes		
1987	Vilangu	Yes	Yes		Yes		
1987	Paasam Oru Vesham	Yes	Yes		Yes		
1989	Sariyana Jodi	Yes		Yes			
1997	Kadavul	Yes					
2000	Puratchikkaaran	Yes					
2005	Power of Women	Yes	Yes				
2007	Shivaji			Yes			
