= Vilangu =

1987 film by P. Jayadevi

- Directed by: P. Jayadevi
- Written by: P. Jayadevi, S. Gajendrakumar (dialogues)
- Produced by: P. Jayadevi
- Starring: Jaishankar
- Cinematography: V. Prabhakar
- Edited by: Natchathiram
- Music by: Shyam
- Production company: Thulasi International
- Release date: 27 February 1987
- Country: India
- Language: Tamil

Vilangu (transl. Handcuff) is a 1987 Indian Tamil-language action thriller film produced, written and directed by P. Jayadevi. The film stars Jaishankar, Arun Pandian, Nizhalgal Ravi, M. N. Nambiar, Sulakshana, Ramya Krishnan and Janagaraj. It revolves around a DIG seeking to capture an international smuggler. The film was released on 27 February 1987.

== Plot ==
DIG Jayaraman seeks to capture an international smuggler.

== Cast ==
- Jaishankar as DIG Jayaraman
- Arun Pandian as Babu
- Nizhalgal Ravi as Vinod
- M. N. Nambiar as the International smuggler
- Sulakshana as Jayaraman's wife
- Ramya Krishnan as Kavitha
- Janagaraj
- Nalinikanth
- Jayamalini
- M. R. K.
- Sathyaraj as Vinod's friend (guest appearance)
- Nalini as Nancy (guest appearance)

== Soundtrack ==
The soundtrack was composed by Shyam and the lyrics were written by Vairamuthu.

Track listing
No.	Title	Singer(s)	Length
1.	"Aayiram Kangal"	S. P. Balasubrahmanyam	4:18
2.	"Unnaithan"	K. J. Yesudas	5:04
3.	"Enna Aachchu Enna Aachchu"	K. S. Chithra	5:00
4.	"Chollatthan Ninaithen"	S. P. Balasubrahmanyam	5:04
5.	"Idu Engal Raajaangam"	Shyam	3:52
Total length:			23:18

== Release and reception ==
Vilangu was released on 27 February 1987. On the same day, N. Krishnaswamy of The Indian Express derided the film, saying, "The film tone is so bad in some stretches that it is almost like a bad video copy."
