= Kayilan =

2025 Tamil film

- Theatrical release poster
- Directed by: Arul Ajit
- Produced by: BT Arasakumar
- Starring: Sshivada; Ramya Pandian; Prajin
- Cinematography: Ameen
- Edited by: Ignatious Aswin
- Music by: Karthik Harsha
- Production company: BTK Films
- Release date: 10 October 2025
- Country: India
- Language: Tamil

Kayilan is a 2025 Indian Tamil-language investigative thriller film directed by Arul Ajit in his directorial debut, starring Sshivada, Ramya Pandian and Prajin in the lead roles. The film is produced by BT Arasakumar under his BTK Films banner and the technical team consists of cinematography by Ameen, editing by Ignatious Aswin, background scored by Hari SR and songs composed by Karthik Harsha. Kayilan released in theatres on 10 October 2025.

== Cast ==
- Sshivada as Aathirai
- Ramya Pandian as Shangunthala
- Prajin as Kandhsamy
- Manobala
- G. Gnanasambandan
- Abishek Joseph George as Keeran
- Anupama Kumar as Chellai Varadharajan
- Gopinath Chandran

== Production ==
The film was previously titled Idumbankaari, having Sshivada playing the role of an NIA officer, and Ramya Pandian as a news channel's editor in the lead roles. The director, Arul Ajit revealed to have changed to the current title Kayilan, meaning, a person with zero errors, for its easier pronunciation. Apart from the lead cast, the film also stars Prajin, Manobala, G. Gnanasambandan, Abishek Joseph and Anupama Kumar in important roles.

== Release and reception ==
Kayilan released in theatres on 10 October 2025. Earlier it was scheduled for 25 July 2025. Maalai Malar reviewed the film by praising the performances of Sshivada and Prajin, the screenplay, while criticising the cinematography, music and the background score.

=== Streaming rights ===
The streaming rights of the movie were bagged by Lionsgate Play, Amazon Prime Video and Simply South on 1 May 2026.
