= House Mates =

2025 Tamil fantasy horror comedy film

- Theatrical release poster
- Directed by: T. Raja Vel
- Written by: T. Raja Vel
- Produced by: S. Vijayaprakash; S. P. Shakthivel; Sivakarthikeyan (presenter)
- Starring: Darshan; Aarsha Chandini Baiju; Kaali Venkat; Vinodhini Vaidyanathan
- Narrated by: R. Parthiban
- Cinematography: M. S. Sathish
- Edited by: Nishar Sharef
- Music by: Rajesh Murugesan
- Production companies: Playsmith Studios; South Studios; Sivakarthikeyan Productions
- Distributed by: AGS Entertainment
- Release date: 1 August 2025
- Running time: 129 minutes
- Country: India
- Language: Tamil

House Mates is a 2025 Indian Tamil-language fantasy horror comedy film directed by T. Raja Vel and starring Darshan, Aarsha Chandini Baiju, Kaali Venkat and Vinodhini Vaidyanathan in the lead roles. The film was jointly produced by S. Vijayaprakash and S. P. Shakthivel under the Playsmith Studios and South Studios banners, and presented by Sivakarthikeyan under his Sivakarthikeyan Productions banner.

House Mates was released theatrically on 1 August 2025. The film opened to positive reviews from critics, who praised the performances of the cast, the unique storyline, direction, music, and cinematography.

== Plot ==
In September 2022, newlyweds Karthik and Anu move into their own second-hand flat after Karthik strives hard to buy it. Anu starts noticing eerie happenings, such as taps turning on and off and switches operating involuntarily. She enquires with the neighbours about any unnatural deaths in the flats. A vegetable vendor mentions one such incident in the same block, when a family went missing without a trace. Anu discovers a child-like drawing on their bedroom wall, hidden behind the bureau. The drawings keep changing and increasing every day. Karthik dismisses her concerns and berates her when she suggests moving out. Around the same time, Karthik also begins noticing the strange occurrences.

Meanwhile, Mahi, a young boy, is playing alone in his flat. He notices movement inside their bureau, and when he tries to investigate, an invisible force pushes him inside. Terrified, he develops a psychogenic fever. The doctor listens to his story. While his parents do not believe him, the doctor suggests he send a message to the "ghost," and if he gets a response, everyone will believe him. Mahi follows the advice and writes a message on his bedroom wall.

This message appears on Anu and Karthik's bedroom wall, terrifying them. They respond, and their reply appears on the wall in Mahi's flat. Though initially frightened, both families eventually realize they are not communicating with ghosts but with another family living elsewhere. It is revealed that Mahi and his family are living in the same flat "F1" in the same building, but in the year September 2012. Sometime between September 2012 and September 2022, they had sold the flat, which Karthik later bought. The families consult physicists in their respective timelines, who explain that this may have occurred due to a "tesseract," creating a bridge between the two years, possibly triggered by a strong negative charged force such as lightning.

The families gradually adapt to the unintentional interference from one another. However, problems arise when Ramesh (Mahi's father), an expert electrician, attempts to retrofit the wiring to separate the electrical connections of the two timelines. Karthik unknowingly switches the power back on in 2022, injuring Ramesh. The constant disturbances leave Karthik sleepless, and he loses his job after dozing off at work and causing a fire accident. These incidents strain the relationship between the two families.

Both families contemplate selling the flat to avoid further hardship. Every attempt by Karthik to sell is thwarted by the unintended interference of Ramesh's family. Eventually, both Ramesh and Karthik independently begin searching for each other in their respective timelines.

Karthik learns that Ramesh sold the flat in 2013, closed his shop, and began working in a factory in Ambattur. He locates Ramesh and tries to explain, but Ramesh does not recognize him. Karthik's friend informs him that the tesseract has created a new timeline for Ramesh and his family, and the Ramesh he found in 2022 is not the same one he has been communicating with in 2012. Still, Karthik hopes the 2022 Ramesh can help and invites him to visit, mentioning that it is the same house Ramesh lived in during 2012. Ramesh agrees.

In 2012, Ramesh finds Karthik working as a pizza delivery driver and asks him to visit his home around 9 PM. Karthik reluctantly agrees.

In 2022, Ramesh and his wife visit Karthik's flat and communicate with their past selves through the wall. It is then revealed that Mahi had died in a freak accident in 2012, and the accident occurred on that very date. 2022 Ramesh begs his 2012 self to immediately find Mahi. The 2012 Ramesh and his wife rush out without reading the final message from 2022, which mentioned the exact location where Mahi was playing.

In 2012, Ramesh and his wife frantically search for Mahi, losing precious time. Meanwhile, Mahi climbs a tree in the apartment park to retrieve a toy helicopter and ends up dangling precariously from a branch. Ramesh hears Mahi's cries and runs toward him. At the same time, a nearby biker notices the boy's danger and springs into action, breaking his fall and saving him from injury.

2022 Ramesh receives a message from the past that Mahi has been saved—by none other than 2012 Karthik, who had come to see Ramesh earlier that day. Though Ramesh and his wife of 2022 no longer have their son, they find solace in knowing that an alternate version of themselves still does.

Karthik and Anu decide to vacate the flat and hand it over to Ramesh and his wife, so that they can remain in touch with their son from the other timeline through the wall.

== Cast ==
- Darshan as N. Karthik
- Aarsha Chandini Baiju as Anu , Karthik's wife
- Kaali Venkat as Ramesh Kumar
- Vinodhini Vaidyanathan as Vijayalakshmi "Viji", Ramesh's wife
- Dheena as Senthil, Karthik's friend
- Abdool Lee as Edison, office senior
- Jeeva Ravi as Karthik's managing director
- Kavitha Bharathi as Anu's father
- TSR Srinivasan as D. D., new house tenant
- Supergood Subramani as Kandhasaamy
- Prashanth Rangaswamy as water supply tempo driver
- Kendrick Ashley as Maheswaran "Mahi", Ramesh and Viji's son
- K. S. G. Venkatesh as exorcist
- Syama Harini as the tesseract informer from 2012 (voice dubbed by Nikila Shankar)
- R. Parthiban as narrator (voice-over)

== Production ==
Darshan who was last seen in Thunivu (2023) and Mukundan Unni Associates (2022) fame Aarsha Chandini Baiju were announced to star in their next comedy fantasy film directed by T. Raja Vel. Debutant director T. Raja Vel had earlier worked as a co-writer in R. Ajay Gnanamuthu's Demonte Colony 2 (2024) and the film stars Kaali Venkat and Vinodhini in important roles. Apart from the lead cast the film also features Dheena, Abdool Lee, and Master Henrik in significant roles.

The technical team consists of MS Sathish as the cinematographer, Nishar Sharef as the editor, and Dinesh as the stunt choreographer. The film is produced by S. Vijayaprakash under Playsmith Studios banner and director S. P. Shakthivel has contributed as the creative producer under his South Studios banner. The film is presented by Sivakarthikeyan's Sivakarthikeyan Productions banner, marking his second collaboration with Darshan as a producer after Kanaa (2018).

Production began on 4 May 2024 after an inaugural muhurat pooja.

== Music ==
House Mates

Soundtrack album by Rajesh Murugesan
- Released: 2025
- Genre: Feature film soundtrack
- Length: 12:29
- Language: Tamil
- Label: Trend Music
- Producer: Rajesh Murugesan

Rajesh Murugesan chronology
United Kingdom of Kerala (2025)	House Mates (2025)

Singles from House Mates
- 1. "Akkalu Bakkalu" Released: 22 July 2025; 2. "Minnali" Released: 26 July 2025

The film's soundtrack was composed by Rajesh Murugesan.

The first single, "Akkalu Bakkalu", was released on 22 July 2025. The second single, "Minnali", was released on 26 July 2025.

No.	Title	Lyrics	Singer(s)	Length
1.	"Akkalu Bakkalu"	Mohan Rajan	Sean Roldan, Rajesh Murugesan	4:02
2.	"Minnali"	Mohan Rajan	Adithya RK	3:43
Total length:				12:29

== Release ==
=== Theatrical ===
House Mates was released theatrically on 1 August 2025.

=== Home media ===
The post-theatrical streaming rights of the film were acquired by ZEE5, while the satellite rights were purchased by Zee Tamil and Zee Thirai.

== Reception ==
Akshay Kumar of Cinema Express gave 3/5 stars and wrote "Housemates, in a nutshell, is a brave and largely successful attempt by debut director Rajavel to tweak the horror genre to accommodate sci-fi elements while also giving it an emotional treatment, thereby not alienating the Tamil audience." Abhinav Subramanian of The Times of India gave 2.5/5 stars and wrote "Director Rajavel treats his sci-fi premise like homework, dutifully ticking boxes without wondering if any of this makes sense. [...] Housemates feels like someone had one good idea at a party and nobody had the heart to tell them it wasn't enough for a whole movie." Bhuvanesh Chandar of The Hindu wrote "Nevertheless, House Mates is a modest win for Rajavel and producer Sivakarthikeyan, as it reasserts with conviction that sometimes the most unassuming of ideas, simple but elegantly told, can make for a good watch."
