= Raame Aandalum Raavane Aandalum =

2021 film by Arisil Moorthy

- Official release poster
- Directed by: Arisil Moorthy
- Written by: Arisil Moorthy
- Produced by: Suriya; Jyothika
- Starring: Mithun Manickam; Ramya Pandian; Vani Bhojan
- Cinematography: M. Sukumar
- Edited by: Shiva Saravanan
- Music by: Krish
- Production company: 2D Entertainment
- Distributed by: Amazon Prime Video
- Release date: 24 September 2021
- Country: India
- Language: Tamil

Raame Aandalum Raavane Aandalum (transl. Whether Rama or Ravana is the ruler now) or simply known as RARA, is a 2021 Tamil-language political drama film directed by Arisil Moorthy, on his directorial debut. It is produced by Suriya and Jyothika of 2D Entertainment. The film features newcomer Mithun Manickam, Ramya Pandian, and Vani Bhojan. The music is composed by Krish, with cinematography handled by M. Sukumar and editing done by Shiva Saravanan.

The film was released on the digital streaming platform Amazon Prime Video on 24 September 2021.

== Plot ==
The film begins with a farmer, Kunnimuthu, going to the police station to lodge a complaint. The constable chases him out after he realises that Kunnimuthu had come to file a report of missing a pair of bulls, Karuppan and Vellaiyan. The bulls are like children for Kunnimuthu and his wife, Veerayi. Veerayi's father gifted the bulls during their wedding four years prior. Since then, the cows have been like their children, and the couple cares for them more than their own lives. Kunnimuthu's friend, Manthini, looks for the bulls along with him, but to no avail.

Once, reporter Narmadha comes to the village to file a documentary, and Manthini helps her. In the process, he finds Kunnimuthu being charged with trying to steal bulls, when in reality, he was searching for his bulls. Narmadha rescues him and learns of it. She decides to help them with her channel. Kunnimuthu reveals that the bulls went missing the night he shamed a minister on stage. The minister had borrowed the bulls, staging them to be given as gifts to farmers. When the minister's men beat the bulls to bring them onstage, Kunnimuthu attacks the minister and takes the bulls away, revealing that the presentation ceremony was not true. Narmadha realizes that the minister had his men abduct the bulls. She sensationalizes the issue, and it gets total Tamil Nadu media coverage. The minister panics when he realizes the bulls are sold.

He comes to the village to make peace with Kunnimuthu, offering him a new pair of cows, only to be insulted by Veerayi. Soon, the sensation wears off, and the village goes back to normal. Narmadha, though, continues helping them. She finds out that not only are the bulls missing, but also the village facilities. The government had made it look like the village was funded to build ponds and schools, when in reality, nothing happened. Narmadha makes YouTube videos and gets in touch with a lawyer from the village. He helps her file a case in the high court to ensure the government does its job. While travelling, Kunnimuthu finds his bulls. He brings them back to his village and realizes that construction work for ponds and other facilities is happening. The family has an emotional reunion with Karuppan and Vellaiyan.

== Cast ==
- Mithun Manickam as Kunnimuthu
- Ramya Pandian as Veerayi
- Vani Bhojan as Narmadha Periyasamy
- Vadivel Murugan as Manthinni

== Production ==
In January 2021, actress Ramya Pandian was reportedly signed for a women-centric film produced by Suriya's 2D Entertainment banner. This film was reportedly directed by newcomer Arisil Moorthy, who revealed that "the storyline is close to the heart", further being considered as an "impactful political satire dealing with human emotions". The film began production on 1 February 2021, and Vani Bhojan joined the film as one of the leads, along with newcomer Mithun Manickam. Shooting took place in Tirunelveli and its surrounding areas and was completed within 50 days.

== Soundtrack ==
Raame Aandalum Raavane Aandalum

Soundtrack album by Krish
- Released: 10 September 2021
- Genre: Feature film soundtrack
- Length: 20:44
- Language: Tamil
- Label: Sony Music
- Producer: Krish
External audio
- Audio Jukebox on YouTube

The film's soundtrack is composed by playback singer Krish. He started working on the soundtrack when the film's production began and completed the recording work, including the final mixing and mastering, by April 2021. The film's soundtrack featured eight tracks: five songs, two themes, and an instrumental track of the song, with lyrics written by Yugabharathi, Vivek, Senthildass Velayutham, and Ve. Madhankumar. Sony Music India acquired the film's rights and released the soundtrack on 10 September 2021.

Track listing
No.	Title	Lyrics	Singer(s)	Length
1.	"Seera Seera"	Yugabharathi	Mahalingam, Rajeshwari, Krish	03:23
2.	"Kaasu"	Ve. Madhankumar	Bamba Bakya	03:43
3.	"Lallaario Lallaario"	Ve. Madhankumar	Velmurugan	02:23
4.	"Suitu Coatu"	Vivek	Priya Mali, Thirumoorthy	03:28
5.	"Enna Vittu Pona"	Senthildass Velayutham	Senthildass Velayutham	02:00
6.	"Raame Aandalum Raavane Aandalum" (Theme)	–	Krish	02:56
7.	"Kodangi"	Ve. Madhankumar	Senthildass Velayutham	01:18
8.	"Suitu Coatu" (Instrumental)	–	Krish	01:32
Total length:				20:44

== Release ==
In August 2021, Suriya signed a four-film deal with the streaming service Amazon Prime Video, wherein films produced by 2D Entertainment would directly premiere on the streaming service. Raame Aandalum Raavane Aandalum, the first of the four-film deal, was released on 24 September 2021.

== Reception ==
Subha J Rao of Film Companion wrote, "The film, directed by Arisil Moorthy and starring Ramya Pandian, Mithun Manickam and two Kangeyam bulls, delivers a part of what it promises." Haricharan Pudipeddi of Hindustan Times wrote, "By taking a satirical stand, the film manages to directly take a dig at the current political scenario. Thankfully, it never goes overboard in its attempt to talk about the flawed system we live in." Janani K of India Today gave 2.5/5 stars and wrote, "Raame Aandalum Raavane Aandalum could have been a heartwarming film had it concentrated mainly on Kunnimuthu and Veerayi’s bond with the bulls." Ashameera Aiyappan of Firstpost wrote, "The biggest limitation of RARA is its lack of emotional depth. The lead couple’s arc remains agonizingly two-dimensional, where we know precious little about them apart from their love for their bulls."
