= Junga (film) =

- Theatrical release poster
- Directed by: Gokul
- Written by: Gokul
- Produced by: Vijay Sethupathi; Arun Pandian; Ishari K. Ganesh; R. M. Rajesh Kumar
- Starring: Vijay Sethupathi; Sayyeshaa
- Cinematography: Dudley
- Edited by: V. J. Sabu Joseph
- Music by: Siddharth Vipin
- Production companies: Vijay Sethupathi Productions; A & P Groups; Vels Film International
- Distributed by: A & P Groups
- Release date: 27 July 2018
- Running time: 157 minutes
- Country: India
- Language: Tamil
- Budget: ₹27 crore

Junga is a 2018 Indian Tamil-language action comedy film written and directed by Gokul. The film stars Vijay Sethupathi in a triple role alongside Sayyeshaa and Madonna Sebastian in a cameo. It was released to mixed reviews from critics, praising Vijay Sethupathi's performance and Yogi Babu’s comedy performance. The music was composed by Siddharth Vipin.

== Plot ==
The film starts with Inspector Manimaran taking the job of Don Junga's encounter, along with Duraisingam (Rajendran). On the way to his encounter, Junga tells his story.

Back in Pollachi, he works as a bus conductor and is in love with Thoppuli. He gets involved in a fight, which angers his mother, as his father Ranga and grandfather Linga were dons with very expensive habits. They also lost their theatre Cinema Paradise and had to sell it to Kumarasamy Chettiyaar, so his mother fears that he will follow their spending habits. Junga tells his mother that he will not be a don like Ranga and Linga and will retrieve their ownership of the theatre. He goes to Chennai with Yo Yo, becomes a miserly don, and starts saving money towards his goal. He also leaves Thoppuli as she wants him to give her a luxurious life and gift her with 365 sarees for each day of the year.

One day, Junga learns that the theatre is being brought down and that Chettiyaar is planning to sell it to a foreign company. He goes to Chettiyaar's house and gives him a crore to buy back his theatre, but Chettiyaar insults him. Junga challenges Chettiyaar that he will retrieve back his theatre. He decides to kidnap Chettiyaar's daughter Yazhini and finds out through Sukumar, an old friend of Ranga and Linga who received a house from them that Yazhini is currently in Paris. Junga plans to kidnap her during her birthday celebration but then the Italian mafia kidnaps her first in order to demand the release of their leader. Junga tells Chettiyaar that he has kidnapped Yazhini and fights with the mafia group to rescue her from them. Yazhini and Junga escape, and Chettiyaar agrees to give Junga's family the theatre in exchange for Yazhini. After the registration Yazhini and Junga get married and the theathre is successfully reopned. But it is revealed that Yo Yo and Jungas other assistants became informants over him giving them plain Upma for their success party which presumably leads to his arrest. In the present Manimaran decides to kill Junga in the car but they all land in a car crash and Junga escapes while being in call with Duraisingam, where in the last scene it shows Junga saying that this film is directed by Gokul while running off with the real film director thanking him in the background.

== Cast ==
- Vijay Sethupathi in a triple role as
  - Don Junga
  - Don Ranga (Junga's father)
  - Don Linga (Junga's grandfather)
- Sayyeshaa as Yazhini
- Suresh Chandra Menon as Kumarasamy Chettiyaar, Yazhini's father
- Yogi Babu as Yo Yo, Junga's assistant
- Rajendran as S. Duraisingam
- Saranya Ponvannan as Junga's mother, Ranga's wife, and Linga's daughter-in-law
- Radha Ravi as Sopraj
- Delhi Ganesh as Sukumar
- Vijaya Patti as Junga's grandmother, Ranga's mother, and Linga's wife
- Vinoth Munna as Inspector G. Manimaran
- KPY Bala as Poetu Dinesh (Note: Inspired by Dhanush's credited name as a lyricist, Poetu Dhanush.)
- Syed as Senthil, Junga's assistant and friend
- Shelfa as Ali
- Anne Brugé as Kalki
- Louna as French TV journalist
- Chaplin Balu
- Madonna Sebastian as Thoppuli (Cameo appearance)
- Gokul in a special appearance
- Sridhar in a special appearance in the song "Amma Mela Sathiyam"
- Jhony in a special appearance in the song "Amma Mela Sathiyam"
- Boopathy in a special appearance in the song "Rise of Don"
- Emcee Jesz in a special appearance in the song "Rise of Don"

== Production ==
The film was shot in Paris, Chennai, Thoothukudi and Ramanathapuram.

== Soundtrack ==
Junga

Soundtrack album by Siddharth Vipin
- Released: 13 June 2018
- Recorded: 2018
- Genre: Film soundtrack
- Length: 23:42
- Language: Tamil
- Label: Think Music
- Producer: Siddharth Vipin

Siddharth Vipin chronology
| Seyal (2018) | Junga (2018) | Thirumanam (2019) |

The soundtrack album was composed by Siddharth Vipin. The complete album was released on 30 July 2018 at Sathyam Cinemas.

All tracks are written by Lalithanand.

Track listing
| No. | Title | Singer(s) | Length |
|---|---|---|---|
| 1. | "Amma Mela Sathiyam" | Jagadeesh Kumar, Pavithra Gokul | 04:12 |
| 2. | "Rise Of Don" | Suraj Jagan, Siddharth Vipin, Rockstar Ramani Ammal, Emcee Jesz | 04:21 |
| 3. | "Parrys To Paris" | Anthony Daasan, Kalpana Raghavendar | 05:18 |
| 4. | "Lolikriya" | Marana Gana Viji, Nakash Aziz | 03:50 |
| 5. | "Kootippo Koodave" | D. Sathyaprakash, Ranina Reddy | 04:53 |
| 6. | "Makkal Selvan Fans Song" | Suraj Jagan, Jagadeesh Kumar | 01:08 |
| Total length: | | | 23:42 |

== Release and reception ==
=== Release ===
The Tamil Nadu theatrical rights were sold for ₹12 crore.

=== Reception ===
On the review aggregator website Rotten Tomatoes, 60% of 5 critics' reviews are positive, with an average rating of 4.7/10.

A critic from The Times of India rated the film 3 1/2 out of 5 and wrote that "A few scenes are far-stretched in the name of comedy, and the pace dips in the second half, but on the whole, Junga is fully worth your time and money". A critic from the Hindustan Times wrote that "Junga is one such film that calls out every cliché you may have seen in gangster dramas. Everything from the performance of Vijay Sethupathi to the comic timing of Yogi Babu works in its favour". A critic from The Hindu wrote that "Junga wants to be that film. It never takes itself too seriously; all it tries to do is set up one comedy scene after another". A critic from The Indian Express rated the film 2 1/2 out of 5 stars and wrote that "Had Junga focused more on the ‘Ezhai, Kanja (transl. poor, stingy) Don’, it would have been thoroughly enjoyable. Instead it becomes a product of something that the film itself criticises at a point". A critic from Deccan Chronicle wrote that "When it switches gears, instead of sticking to the miserly plot in the second half with several clichéd scenes like a song placement just before confrontation between Junga and Yazhini or the far-fetched lengthy car chase scenes during the climax, it succumbs to its own stereotypes". A critic from Cinema Express wrote that "is at least a lot funnier [than Iraivi, Aandavan Kattalai and Oru Nalla Naal Paathu Solren] — but it’s also scarier because it shows Vijay Sethupathi pandering to the sort of lazy song placements and mundane stunt choreography that are such a striking and frustrating part of routine ‘mass entertainers’".
