= Puratchikkaaran =

- Directed by: Velu Prabhakaran
- Written by: P. Jayadevi
- Produced by: Ko. Sami Durai
- Starring: Velu Prabhakaran; Sathyaraj; Arun Pandian; Khushbu; Roja
- Cinematography: K. S. Udhaya Shankar
- Edited by: B. S. Nagaraj
- Music by: Vidyasagar
- Production company: Liberty Creations P. Ltd
- Release date: 22 September 2000
- Running time: 140 minutes
- Country: India
- Language: Tamil

Purathcikkaaran (transl. Revolutionary) is a 2000 Indian Tamil-language film directed by Velu Prabhakaran and scripted by P. Jayadevi. The film stars the director himself in the lead role with Sathyaraj, Radhika, Arun Pandian, Khushbu and Roja in other pivotal roles.

== Plot ==
Thamizhmani, a non-believer in god, kidnaps three different heads of religion. During an interview at his hideout, he relates to Kanimozhi, a journalist, how a Brahmin turned into a terrorist.

== Cast ==
- Velu Prabhakaran as Thamizhmani / Ramanujam
- Sathyaraj as Anna
- Arun Pandian as Anbu
- Mansoor Ali Khan
- Khushbu as Kalyani
- Roja as Kanimozhi
- Neena as Valli
- Manivannan
- Radharavi
- Senthil
- Janagaraj
- Mohan Raman
- Radhika in a cameo appearance

== Production ==
The film was launched at a ceremony in February 1998, with Kamal Haasan attending as the chief guest.

== Soundtrack ==
The soundtrack was composed by Vidyasagar.

Song	Singer(s)	Lyrics	Duration
"Thaazhntha"	Hariharan	Vairamuthu	5:00
"Kadavul Illada"	Mano	Vairamuthu	4:55
"Mannuku Nammathan"	Krishnaraj	Vairamuthu	4:52
"Thoongum Puli"	Nithyashree Mahadevan	Bharathidasan	5:08
"Ottrai Paarvaiyila"	Harini, Srinivas	Vairamuthu	4:00

== Critical reception ==
Malini Mannath of Chennai Online wrote, "Velu Prabhakaran is on his favourite turf, one which he had handled earlier in 'Kadavul'. The black costumes and the names given to the characters leave no doubt about his leanings. The lines at times are punchy and drive home certain home truths. While one can applaud his guts in taking a stand over a sensitive issue, the director does go to the other extreme". Visual Dasan of Kalki praised the revolutionary message of the film but felt the film has documentary feel and risk of becoming a propaganda.
