= Vaazha Ninaithaal Vaazhalaam =

- Poster
- Directed by: Devaraj–Mohan
- Screenplay by: Panchu Arunachalam
- Story by: Manian
- Produced by: Subha A. Sundaram
- Starring: Jaishankar; Sripriya; Jayadevi
- Cinematography: M. R. Raveendran
- Edited by: M. Vellaichami
- Music by: Ilaiyaraaja
- Production company: Sri Kamakodi Films
- Release date: 14 January 1978
- Country: India
- Language: Tamil

Vaazha Ninaithaal Vaazhalaam (transl. You can live if you want to live) is a 1978 Indian Tamil-language film romantic drama film directed by Devaraj–Mohan and written by Panchu Arunachalam from a story by Manian. The film stars Jaishankar, Sripriya and Jayadevi, with Major Sundarrajan, Thengai Srinivasan, I. S. R., Ennathe Kannaiah, Manorama, S. N. Lakshmi and Typist Gopu in supporting roles. It was released on 14 January 1978.

== Plot ==
Jaishankar and Sripriya are lovers, but due to circumstances beyond their control, they are unable to marry. Jaishankar instead marries Jayadevi. During his marital bliss, Sripriya re-enters his life, leading to emotional upheavals.

== Cast ==
- Jaishankar
- Sripriya as Jaishankar's ex-lover
- Jayadevi as Jaishankar's wife
- Major Sundarrajan
- Thengai Srinivasan
- I. S. R.
- Ennathe Kannaiah
- Manorama as a mute woman
- S. N. Lakshmi
- Typist Gopu

== Soundtrack ==
The music was composed by Ilaiyaraaja. The song 'Veenai Mattum" is set to the Hindustani raga Malgunji. The dappankuthu number "Kaanakuruvikku" attained popularity. It was the first song that Manorama sang for Ilaiyaraaja.

Track listing
No.	Title	Lyrics	Singer(s)	Length
1.	"Thanakkoru"	Kannadasan	Vani Jairam, Chorus
2.	"Kaanakuruvikku"	Panchu Arunachalam	Manorama
3.	"Veenai Meettum"	Panchu Arunachalam	S. Janaki
4.	"Iyarkkai Radhangale"	Kannadasan	T. M. Soundararajan, P. Susheela

== Release and reception ==
Vaazha Ninaithaal Vaazhalaam was released on 14 January 1978. Ananda Vikatan rated the film 28 out of 100, criticising the story for lack of innovativeness, but lauded Manorama's comedy as the film's saving grace.
