= Kannagi (2023 film) =

2023 film by Yashwanth Kishore

- Theatrical release poster
- Directed by: Yashwanth Kishore
- Written by: Yashwanth Kishore
- Produced by: M Ganesh; J Dhanush
- Starring: Keerthi Pandiyan; Ammu Abhirami; Vidya Pradeep; Shaalin Zoya
- Cinematography: Ramji
- Edited by: K.Sarath Kumar
- Music by: Shaan Rahman
- Production companies: Sky Moon Entertainment and E5 Entertainment
- Distributed by: Sakthi Film Factory
- Release date: 14 December 2023
- Country: India
- Language: Tamil

Kannagi is a 2023 Indian Tamil-language drama film directed by Yashwanth Kishore in his directorial debut and produced by M.Ganesh and J.Dhanush under the production banners Sky Moon Entertainment and E5 Entertainment. The film stars Keerthi Pandiyan in the titular role with Ammu Abhirami, Vidya Pradeep and Shaalin Zoya. The film features music composed by Shaan Rahman with cinematography handled by Ramji and editing done by K.Sarath Kumar. The story follows Four women whose lives are dominated, crafted, and judged by society and affected, changed and disturbed by external influences.

== Plot ==
The film's theme is about issues faced by women in today's Indian society. Four women whose lives are dominated, crafted, and judged by society and affected, changed and disturbed by external influences.

== Cast ==
- Keerthi Pandiyan as Gita
- Ammu Abhirami as Kalai
- Vidya Pradeep as Nethra
- Shaalin Zoya as Nadhi
- Mayilsamy as Kannagi's father
- Vetri MV as Sasi
- Adhesh Sudhakar as Abhiroop
- Mounika as Sarala, Kannagi's mother
- Yashwanth Kishore as G. P. Yashwanth Kishore
- Kothandam as Kannagi's Sait uncle
- Rethika Srinivas as Lawyer
- Pandian as Judge
- Srilekha Rajendran as Sasi's mother
- Junga Paati as Kannagi's grandmother
- Nakkalaites Sreeja as Sri, Kannagi's cousin
- Nakkalaites Meena, Kannagi's aunt
- Nakkalaites Manoj, Sasi's friend
- Nakkalaites Mithra as Kannagi's friend

== Production ==
The film was announced on 17 August 2021 with reveal of the first look and title. Filming commenced in 2021.The trailer was released on 2 December 2023.

== Music ==
Kannagi

Soundtrack album by Shaan Rahman
- Released: 2023
- Recorded: 2023
- Genre: Feature film soundtrack
- Language: Tamil
- Label: Think Music
- Producer: Shaan Rahman

Shaan Rahman chronology
King of Kotha (2023)	Kannagi (2023)	Neymar (2023)

Singles from Kannagi
- 1. "Goppurane" Released: 16 January 2023; 2. "Idhuvellam Mayakama" Released: 29 November 2023

The music of the film was composed by Shaan Rahman with lyrics by Karthik Netha.The first single ''Goppurane'' was released on 16 January 2023. The second single ''Idhuvellam Mayakama'' was released on 29 November 2023.

All tracks are written by Karthik Netha.

Track listing
No.	Title	Lyrics	Singer(s)	Length
1.	"Goppurane"	Karthik Netha	Srinidhi Sriprakash	4:56
2.	"Idhuvellam Mayakama"	Karthik Netha	Gowri Lekshmi; Shaan Rahman	4:25
Total length:				9:21

== Release ==
The film was released on 14 December 2023.

== Reception ==
Janani K of Indiatoday.in gave 1.5 out of 5 stars and stated, "The way the four stories converge at a point in 'Kannagi' during the climax didn't pay off well either. It is done in a manner that could leave the audience confused." Anusha Sundar of Cinema Express wrote that "All the minute details finally lead up to the “twist”, which becomes the mother of all inconsistencies of Kannagi."
