= Ramya Pandian =

Indian actress (born 1990)

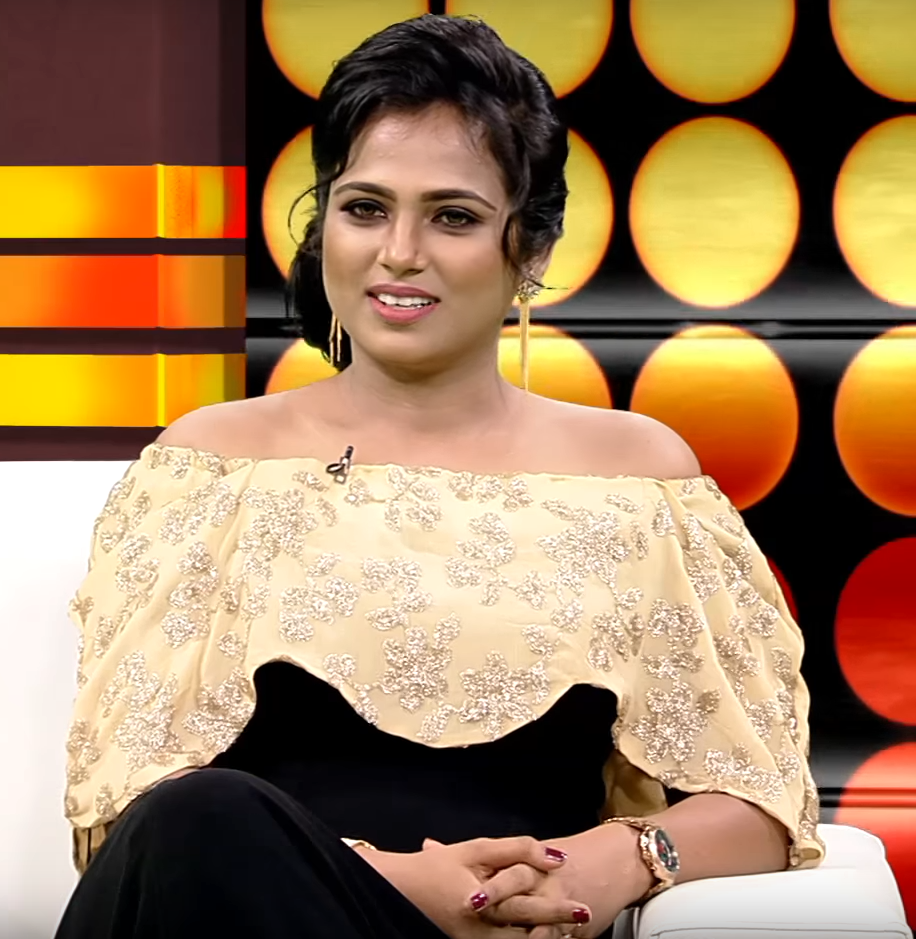
- Ramya in 2018
- Born: August 13, 1990 (age 36); Ilanji, Tenkasi, Tamil Nadu, India
- Occupation: Actress
- Years active: 2009–present
- Notable work: Joker, Aan Devathai, Raame Aandalum Raavane Aandalum, Nanpakal Nerathu Mayakkam
- Television: Cooku With Comali, Bigg Boss Tamil
- Spouse: Lovel Dhawan (m. 2024)
- Parents: Durai Pandian (father); Shanthy Duraipandiyan (mother)
- Relatives: Arun Pandian (uncle); Keerthi Pandiyan (cousin); Ashok Selvan (cousin-in-law)

Ramya Pandian (born 13 August 1990) is an Indian actress who works in Tamil language films. She is known for her role in Joker (2016) and Aan Devathai (2018). She was listed by the Chennai Times as the "Most Desirable Woman on Television 2020". In 2021, she participated in the reality show Bigg Boss 4 and emerged as the 3rd runner-up.

== Career ==
Ramya Pandian received her bachelor's degree in Biomedical Engineering from College of Engineering, Guindy affiliated to Anna University. After graduation, she started working as a Research and Development Analyst before being promoted as a Business Development Manager. She got the opportunity to work with Mani Ratnam's assistant director, Shelley, on a short film title Maane Theyne Ponmaane. She auditioned and landed a role in Balaji Sakthivel's Ra Ra Rajasekhar, but the film did not materialise during that time. She subsequently went on to make her acting debut with the low budget Dummy Tappasu (2015). The team of Ra Ra Rajasekhar recommended her to Raju Murugan who subsequently signed her up for Joker (2016). She played a village belle in the film.

Samuthirakani appreciated Ramya's performance in Joker and asked her if she was interested in doing a role in Aan Devathai (2018) as a mother who works for an IT company. Ramya agreed to do the film after listening to the story. In a review of the film, a critic from India Today noted that "Ramya Pandian is mostly convincing as the mother of two, struggling to balance between being a mother and pursuing her career".

She was a contestant on the cooking show, Cooku with Comali and a judge on the comedy television show, Kalakka Povathu Yaaru. She was the second runner-up in Cooku with Comali. In 2020, she had participated as a contestant in the fourth season of the reality show Bigg Boss Tamil. She was the only female finalist and emerged as the 2nd Runner-Up. She played the female lead in the web series Mugilan, which released on ZEE5 in October 2020. She acted in Raame Aandalum Raavane Aandalum (2021), which was produced by Suriya's 2D Entertainment. Her upcoming project is a film produced by C. V. Kumar's Thirukumaran Entertainment.

== Personal life ==
Ramya Pandian is the daughter of former film director Durai Pandian (directed Uzhiyan), and niece of actor Arun Pandian, who works in Tamil-language films. Her family is from Tirunelveli. Her sister Sundari Divya is also an actress. She has mentioned her interest in organic gardening.

In 2024, Ramya married yoga instructor and trainer Lovel Dhawan in Rishikesh along the Ganges river in a private Hindu wedding ceremony.

== Filmography ==
=== Film ===
Year	Film	Role(s)	Notes	Ref.
2015	Dummy Tappasu	Sowmiya	Debut film	
2016	Joker	Malliga		
2018	Aan Devathai	Jessica		
2021	Raame Aandalum Raavane Aandalum	Veerayi	Nominated JFW - Just For Women Movie Awards - Best Actress – Lead Role	
2023	Nanpakal Nerathu Mayakkam	Poonkuzhali	Malayalam debut film	
2025	Kayilan	Shakunthala		
2026	Charukesi	Gautami		
2026	Arulvaan	Amaravalli		
2026	Baththa	Jayanthi	Cameo appearance	

=== Web series ===
Year	Film	Role	Streaming Channel	Notes	Ref.
2020	Mugilan	Maheshwari	ZEE5	Debut Web Series	
2023	Accidental Farmer and Co	Sheela	SonyLIV		

=== Television ===
Year	Title	Channel	Role	Notes	Ref.
2019	Cooku with Comali Season 1	Star Vijay	Contestant	2nd Runner-Up	
2020	Kalakka Povadhu Yaaru Season 9	Star Vijay	Judge		
2020-2021	Bigg Boss Tamil Season 4	Star Vijay	Contestant	3rd Runner-Up	
2021	Bigg Boss Season 4 Kondattam	Star Vijay	Guest	Celebration of Bigg Boss Season 4	
2021	Cooku with Comali (season 2)	Star Vijay	Guest	One Episode Only	
2021	BB Jodigal	Star Vijay	Guest	Grand Finale Episode Only	
2022	Bigg Boss Ultimate (season 1)	Star Vijay	Contestant	2nd Runner-Up	
2022	Bigg Boss (Tamil season 6)	Star Vijay	Guest	Grand launch episode	
2025	Cooku with Comali season 6	Star Vijay	Guest		
2026	Cooku with Comali season 7	Star Vijay	Senior cook	Eliminated episode 36	

Songs
Year	Title	Notes
2023	Thota	Retro Song by Noise and Grains
