= Power of Women (film) =

- DVD cover
- Directed by: P. Jayadevi
- Written by: P. Jayadevi
- Produced by: P. Jayadevi
- Starring: Khushbu; Hariharan; Riyaz Khan
- Cinematography: Kichas
- Music by: Vidyasagar
- Production company: Jayadevi Films
- Release date: 27 May 2005
- Country: India
- Language: Tamil

Power of Women is a 2005 Indian Tamil-language drama film, written and directed by P. Jayadevi. The film stars Khushbu, Hariharan and Riyaz Khan. Music for the film was composed by Vidyasagar. The film was released on 27 May 2005, and was a box office failure. It won the Tamil Nadu State Film Award for Second Best Film, and Khan won for Best Villain.

== Plot ==
Aatma (Hariharan) is an international fusion singer and social activist, who protests for the emancipation of women and writes books on the subject. His latest book, Marana Sasanam, proves to be controversial and subsequently leads to him being put under house arrest. Through a flashback to visiting students, he narrates the story of the Indian village girl Jyoti (Khushbu) who marries and is then widowed in her formative years, resulting in her dropping out of education. She then marries a wealthy NRI, Shyam (Riyaz Khan), and leaves India to head to Canada.

She copes well with the change in her lifestyle until she discovers that Shyam operates an illegal passport business, hence Jyoti attempts to rebel in vain against her husband. Aatma befriends her and offers her solace and subsequently Shyam suspects his wife and Aatma of having an illicit relationship. Jyothi then hears that her husband is going to blow up the CN Tower in Canada, and decides to tell the police but is killed by Shyam. The film concludes with Aatma revealing the various instances in the holy books of different religions which give women only a secondary status and remarks about his displeasure at the current status quo. The court subsequently chooses not to ban the book.

== Cast ==
- Khushbu as Jothi
- Hariharan as Aatma
- Riyaz Khan as Shyam
- Amanda Prasow

== Production ==
Singer Hariharan joined the film's cast in August 2001 and made his acting debut with the venture. Jayadevi initially cast Parthiban for Hariharan's role who agreed to act but later pulled out after the film was getting delayed in entering production. Kausalya was selected to portray another female lead; however she ultimately did not feature. Scenes were shot in Toronto, Canada during May 2002 with Hariharan and Kushboo.

== Soundtrack ==
The soundtrack was composed by Vidyasagar.

Track listing
No.	Title	Singer(s)	Length
1.	"Maragatha Mazhaithuli"	Hariharan, Sadhana Sargam
2.	"Malare Nee Vazhga"	Hariharan, Sujatha Mohan
3.	"Panae Undhan"	Hariharan
4.	"Thathithi Thaththi"	Shankar Mahadevan, Anuradha Sriram
5.	"All Over Round"	Clinton Cerejo

== Critical reception ==
Malini Mannath from Chennai Online wrote, "neither do we get to see much oppression here, nor of any serious assertion! It's woman's foolishness, insensitivity and confusion rather than her 'power' that comes across".
