= Kuttram Seiyel =

2019 film by Venkatesh and Bharathirajaa

- Directed by: Venkatesh; Bharathirajaa
- Produced by: Dr. S. Selvamuthu (co-producer) Bharathirajaa
- Starring: Bose Venkat; Vijith; Dr. S. Selvamuthu; Dheena; Rajini Samuvel; Bharathirajaa
- Cinematography: RK Prathap
- Edited by: Premkumar
- Music by: Arvin Raj
- Production company: Cini Shatriya Sdn Bhd
- Distributed by: Astro Vaanavil
- Release date: 7 March 2019
- Running time: 115 minutes
- Country: Malaysia
- Language: Tamil

Kuttram Seiyel (transl. Don't commit crimes) is a 2019 Malaysian Tamil-language action crime film directed by Venkatesh and Bharathirajaa. The latter stars in the film alongside Bose Venkat, Vijith, producer Dr. S. Selvamuthu, Dheena and Rajini Samuvel.

The film follows a police officer who is determined to take down a famous gangster in the city, while two groups of college students start doing research on the case. It was released on 7 March 2019 in Malaysia. The film was screened in Chennai.

== Synopsis ==
There is a famous gangster in the city who is constantly extorting and obtaining money from the business community in that area. He kills anyone who is against him. A police officer is determined to take down the gangster and end the crime. Meanwhile, things worsen when two groups of college students become interested in the case and do their own research on it.

== Cast ==
- Bose Venkat as Nagaraj
- Vijith as Inspector Prem
- Dr S Selvamuthu as Bhavani
- Dheena as Roopan
- Rajini Samuvel as Roba Raja
- Bharathirajaa as Boss Nada
- Thiruvengadam as Professor
- T.Natarajan as Raghu
- Prem as Guru
- Viharika as Anjali
- Manikumar Raja as Prabhu
- Sathiswaran as Ganesh
- Kabinaesh KV Sudhan as Uthay
- Ragavendran as Rahul
- Mithun as Selvam
- Hemaraj as Hema
- Anishwaran as Harish
- Thinarasan as Thina
- Krishnakumar as Kathir
- Ravi as Mari
- Kumeresan as Kumar
- Gobi as Babu
- Datuk Suren as Naren
- Richard Gamez as David
- Sonia as Roba Raja's assistant
- Dato Balakumaran as Bala
- Ramu
- Cheetah Shan
- Guna
- Raj
- Daniel
- Harish Siva

== Production ==
The film was codirected by Venkatesh, an Indian, and his son Bharathirajaa. The film was shot in Malaysia and India in sixty days. The cast comprises Indian actors Bose Venkat, Vijith, and Dheena and Malaysian actors Selvamuthu Sam. The film is about the gangsterism of Malaysian Indians.

== Soundtrack ==
The film features three songs by newcomer Arvin Raj.

Kuttram Seiyel (Original Soundtrack) - Tamil
No.	Title	Lyrics	Singer(s)	Length
1.	"Annanukku Porandha Day"	Ra Sankar	Gana Bala	4:24
Total length:				4:24
