= Kaashmora =

2016 Indian film by Gokul

- Theatrical release poster
- Directed by: Gokul
- Written by: Yashwant Mahilwar; John Mahendran (dialogue); R. Murugesan (additional dialogue)
- Screenplay by: Gokul
- Story by: Gokul
- Produced by: S. R. Prakashbabu; S. R. Prabhu
- Starring: Karthi; Nayanthara; Sri Divya
- Cinematography: Om Prakash
- Edited by: V. J. Sabu Joseph
- Music by: Santhosh Narayanan
- Production company: Dream Warrior Pictures
- Distributed by: Sri Thenandal Films
- Release date: 28 October 2016
- Running time: 164 minutes
- Country: India
- Language: Tamil
- Budget: ₹60 crore

Kaashmora (transl. Deadly spirit) (Note: Also the title character.) is a 2016 Indian Tamil-language horror masala film written and directed by Gokul. It features Karthi in a dual roles as the protagonist and antagonist respectively alongside Nayanthara and Sri Divya. The film features soundtrack composed by Santhosh Narayanan, cinematography handled by Om Prakash and edited by V. J. Sabu Joseph. It was released worldwide on 28 October 2016, coinciding with Diwali.

== Plot ==
Kaashmora and his family are con artists who cheat people in the name of black magic and dark spirits. One day, Yamini, a PhD research student, joins Kaashmora to gather evidence and expose him to the public. Kaashmora's fame makes him respected by a superstitious and fraudulent minister. Kaashmora earns Minister Dhanakodi's trust. When the income tax department raids Dhanakodi's house, he asks his henchmen to transfer all the illegal money to Kaashmora's house. Seeing this as an opportunity to escape and settle abroad, Kaashmora's family runs off with the money. Meanwhile, Chelapathy Rao seeks Kaashmora's help and brings him to a haunted bungalow on the outskirts of Tamil Nadu and Andhra Pradesh. In the house, actual ghosts haunt Kaashmora.

Meanwhile, in Chennai, Dhanakodi learns that Kaashmora is a fraudster and sends his henchmen to kill his family. The henchmen try to get Kaashmora from the bungalow but cannot since the ghost beats them and drags Kaashmora and his family inside the house. The family encounters a broker who has been trapped inside the house for a long time. The broker says that the bungalow was once a princess's palace. Ever since her death, residents and owners of the house have met with an ill fate. He also informs them that there are 13 ghosts in the bungalow. The trapped people meet the ghost of Raj Nayak, the head of all 12 spirits. Raj Nayak asks Kaashmora to help him and his subordinates reach the spiritual world. He then locks them in the castle. That night, a young girl in Kaashmora's dream leads him to a closed door within the palace.

As Kaashmora wakes up, Yamini tells him that Chelapathy Rao, the man who led him here, died 75 years ago, and his spirit took Kaashmora and Yamini here. Kaashmora searches the castle and gets hold of an old book dating back 700 years, narrating about Raj Nayak.

Raj Nayak was a self-obsessed warlord and a womaniser. The king remained silent and did not interfere with Raj Nayak's growing atrocities because of his military prowess. One day, Princess Rathna Mahadevi eloped with her lover, the enemy kingdom's prince. The king announced that he would marry Rathna and give away half of his kingdom to the man who finds her. Raj Nayak killed the prince and brought Rathna back. He demanded to be married to the princess and wanted the other half of the kingdom to be a dowry. When opposed, he killed the crown prince and the king. Raj Nayak then married Rathna and crowned himself king. However, Rathna had other plans. She and her friends deceived and seduced Raj Nayak and his subordinates. While Raj Nayak's subordinates were drugged and burned alive, Rathna beheaded Raj Nayak when he started to faint. However, he killed her and her assistants before dying. Before breathing her last breath, Rathna, having magical powers, placed a curse on the 13 men, preventing them from reaching the spiritual world.

Afterwards, Raj Nayak and the other 12 ghosts haunted the palace and its occupants. According to an exorcist, Raj Nayak would become immortal if he sacrificed five people in a family born with the same birth star (Rohini). A lady who is the only woman in her generation should perform the sacrifice. It should happen during the Navakaali Pournami (special full moon night), which occurs once every millennium. Kaashmora recollects that his family members all have the same birth sign and that Yamini is the only woman in her family.

That night, Navakaali Pournami occurs, and Raj Nayak forces Kaashmora and his family to the guillotine. The young girl from Kaashmora's dream appears and turns out to be Rathna's reincarnation. While Rathna and Raj Nayak fight each other, Kaashmora fends off the subordinate ghosts with the help of a magical sword. Rathna's conscience leads him to a chamber within the castle where Raj Nayak's remains are. Using the dagger, Kaashmora destroys the remains, making Raj Nayak vulnerable. Rathna's spirit destroys Raj Nayak's spirit, and it goes to the underworld thus escaping his curse. The other spirits flee the castle for the spiritual world. Having escaped the palace, Kaashmora claims he defeated the ghosts and cleansed the centuries-old bungalow. Kaashmora's family gives Dhanakodi his documents and informs him that the spirit kept the stolen money. The camera that Yamini used to record Kaashmora is eventually burnt by his father.

== Cast ==
- Karthi as Kaashmora and Raj Nayak (dual role)
- Nayanthara as Rathna Mahadevi
- Sri Divya as Yamini
- Vivek as Kaashmora's father
- Sharath Lohithaswa as Minister Dhanakodi
- Syed as Minister's P.A.
- Madhusudhan Rao as Swamy Thirumeni
- Pattimandram Raja as Yamini's father
- Saravana Subbiah as show host
- Muruganandam as a property broker
- Jangiri Madhumitha as Amala, Kaashmora's sister
- Siddharth Vipin as Yamini's groom
- Vinoth Munna as Assistant Commissioner
- David Solomon Raja as Inspector
- Mukhtar Khan as King
- Ajay Ghosh as Priest
- Arandhai Rajagopal as Thirumeni's assistant
- Raju Sundaram special appearance in the song "Dhikku Dhikku Sir"

== Production ==
Production begun in the first week of May 2015, delayed from February. Karthi plays two roles, including the title character. Vadivelu was initially cast as this character's father before he was replaced by Vivek. Karthi learnt horseriding in preparation for his other role. The technical crew includes the art director Rajeevan, editor V. J. Sabu Joseph, and cinematographer Om Prakash. The film was marketed as a mix of action and comedy.

The "3D Face scan" technology has been used in this film. Kaashmora comprises 70 minutes of VFX scenes. Director Gokul says that, 360-degree omnidirectional camera rig is used for shooting a particular sequence and this is the first Indian film to use this technology. This technology covers entire 360 degree, approximately entire sphere. Omnidirectional cameras are used where large visual field coverage is needed, such as in panoramic photography. This camera is used in this film to shoot a song and few scenes. Filming wrapped in June 2016.

== Soundtrack ==
Kaashmora

Soundtrack album by Santhosh Narayanan
- Released: 7 October 2016
- Recorded: 2015–2016
- Studios: Future Tense studios Prism Sounds Studios; Studios 301; Studio M1
- Genre: Feature film soundtrack
- Length: 23:41
- Language: Tamil
- Label: Think Music
- Producer: Santhosh Narayanan

Santhosh Narayanan chronology
Kodi (2016)	Kaashmora (2016)	Guru (2017)
External audio
- Official Audio Jukebox on YouTube

The soundtrack album is composed by Santhosh Narayanan, collaborating with Karthi for the second time after Madras (2014). The audio rights were purchased by Think Music. The soundtrack album was launched on 7 October 2016, in Chennai.

The Times of India rated the album 3 out of 5, and stated that "This one's not a usual Santhosh fest, but works in some parts!"

Track listing
No.	Title	Lyrics	Singer(s)	Length
1.	"Dhikku Dhikku Sir"	Lalithanand	Santhosh Narayanan	3:15
2.	"Jagadhammaa"	Muthamil	Ananthu	3:25
3.	"Oyaa Oyaa"	Lalithanand	Kalpana Raghavendar	4:57
4.	"Thakida Thakida"	Muthamil	Santhosh Narayanan, Saisharan	3:51
5.	"Dhikku Dhikku Sir" (Karaoke)			3:15
6.	"Oyaa Oyaa" (Karaoke)			4:57
Total length:				23:41

== Release ==
Kaashmora was released worldwide on 28 October 2016 with Sri Thenandal Films buying the distribution rights. The satellite rights were sold to Jaya TV, where it premiered on 14 April 2017. Digital rights of the film were bought by Amazon Prime Video.

== Reception ==
M. Suganth of The Times of India wrote, "The film contains the usual horror comedy tropes, but presents them all in a slightly different way, and at a grander scale, which makes it feel different, even though it is essentially an old wine in a new, big-budget bottle". The Hindu wrote, "All in all, it is a good effort and should appeal to dark fantasy lovers".

== Box office ==
The film collected ₹8 crore (US$830,000) in Tamil Nadu on the first day. The film collected more than ₹26 crore (US$2.7 million) worldwide in two days.

== Accolades ==
The film won two Tamil Nadu State Film Awards: Best Comedy Actress (Madhumita) and Best Stunt Coordinator (Anbariv), sharing the latter award with 24.
