= Thumbaa =

2019 Indian film directed by Harish Ram

- Poster
- Directed by: Harish Ram L. H.
- Written by: Harish Ram L. H. Ram Raghav; Prabagaran AR
- Produced by: Surekha Nyapati
- Starring: Darshan; Keerthi Pandian; Dheena
- Cinematography: Naren Elan
- Edited by: R. Kalaivanan
- Music by: Anirudh Ravichander; Vivek-Mervin; Santhosh Dhayanidhi
- Production companies: Regal Reels; Roll Time Studios
- Distributed by: KJR Studios
- Release date: 21 June 2019
- Running time: 123 minutes
- Country: India
- Language: Tamil

Thumbaa is a 2019 Indian Tamil-language adventure film written and directed by Harish Ram L. H. on his directorial debut. The film stars Darshan, newcomer Keerthi Pandian and Dheena. Produced by Surekha Nyapati, the film was distributed by KJR Studios. The film is set against the backdrop of Western Ghats, and mostly consists of VFX and computer graphics. Principal photography began on 27 December 2018, and was completed on 11 April 2019.

The soundtrack of the film features three songs composed by Anirudh Ravichander, Vivek-Mervin, and Santhosh Dhayanidhi, with the latter composing the background music. The cinematography was handled by Naren Elan and edited by R. Kalaivanan. The film was dubbed in Telugu, Malayalam and Hindi and released worldwide on 21 June 2019.

== Plot ==
Hari (Darshan) and Umapathy (Dheena) come to Top Slip to paint a tiger statue and colorfully design a well-located mountaintop. Then, there is an aspiring young wildlife photographer named Varsha (Keerthi Pandian), who gets special permission to click pictures inside the forest. Meanwhile, Thumbaa, a tiger from Kerala, enters into Top Slip along with its cub. A cunning forest officer denies that the tiger entered his range and sketches a plan to capture it and sell it to buyers. The reason why the forest officer planned to capture Thumbaa is because it does not have the tracker, whereas all other tigers in the forest are being monitored. The rest of the film is all about how Hari, Uma, and Varsha, with the help of local people, save Thumbaa and its cub from the forest officer and his gang.

== Cast ==
- Darshan as Hari
- Keerthi Pandiyan as Varsha Kumaran
- Dheena as Umapathy
- Dharani Vasudevan as District Forest Officer
- George Vijay Nelson as Singam
- Kalaiyarasan Kannusamy as Mani
- KPY Bala as Suresh
- Ravi Raghavendra as Varsha's father
- KPY Palani as Palani
- Kadhal Kannan as Dr. Jaikumar
- Ravi Mohan as John (guest appearance)

== Production ==
The filmmakers hired Keerthi Pandian, the daughter of veteran actor and producer Arun Pandian, on her acting debut as the female lead in the film opposite Kanaa-fame Darshan and Dheena who play the male lead characters. The film's shooting wrapped on 11 April 2019.

== Soundtrack ==
Thumbaa

Soundtrack album by Anirudh Ravichander, Vivek-Mervin, and Santhosh Dhayanidhi
- Released: 22 April 2019
- Recorded: 2018–2019
- Studios: Albuquerque Records, Chennai
- Genre: Feature film soundtrack
- Length: 11:41
- Label: Sony Music
- Producer: Surekha Nyapati

Anirudh Ravichander chronology
| Jersey (2019) | Thumbaa (2019) | Gang Leader (2019) |

Vivek-Mervin chronology
| Vedigundu Pasangge (2019) | Thumbaa (2019) | Sanga Thamizhan (2019) |

Santhosh Dhayanidhi chronology
| Lisaa (2019) | Thumbaa (2019) | Danny (2020) |

Singles from Thumbaa
- 1. "Pudhusattam" Released: 8 April 2019; 2. "Jilebara" Released: 26 April 2019; 3. "Humpty Dumpty" Released: 10 May 2019

The film's soundtrack album has three songs, with Anirudh Ravichander, Vivek–Mervin, and Santhosh Dhayanidhi composing one song each. All the songs were released as singles. The first single track "Pudhusattam" composed and sung by Anirudh Ravichander and written by Madhan Karky was released on 8 April 2019. The second single track "Jilebara" sung by Vivek Siva, Mervin Solomon and Jonita Gandhi, written by Ku. Karthik was released on 26 April 2019. The third single track "Humpty Dumpty" which composed by Santhosh Dhayanidhi, penned by Ku. Karthik and sung by Sivakarthikeyan was released on 10 May 2019.

The album met with positive reviews. The Times of India reviewed that "Thumbaa songs play and frolic around you like a refreshing wave. The songs do what many of the new releases haven’t managed to — touch/change your mood. All the three songs are fun and playful, reminding one of childhood days spend running around catching butterflies."

| No. | Title | Lyrics | Music | Singer(s) | Length |
|---|---|---|---|---|---|
| 1. | "Pudhusattam" | Madhan Karky | Anirudh Ravichander | Anirudh Ravichander | 4:28 |
| 2. | "Jilebara" | Ku. Karthik | Vivek–Mervin | Vivek Siva, Mervin Solomon, Jonita Gandhi | 4:32 |
| 3. | "Humpty Dumpty" | Ku. Karthik | Santhosh Dhayanidhi | Sivakarthikeyan | 2:41 |
| Total length: | | | | | 11:41 |

== Marketing ==
A musical promo video of the film was released on 21 February 2019 in Tamil by actress Keerthy Suresh, Telugu by actor Sai Dharam Tej, Malayalam by Nivin Pauly and Hindi by rapper Badshah. It features composer Anirudh Ravichander and a VFX generated tiger. The promo was unveiled on YouTube and crossed 1.5 million views within 24 hours and gained positive reviews among the audience in the social media.

== Release ==
The film initially slated to release on 17 May 2019, but its release date pushed to 21 June 2019. The film was dubbed in Telugu, Malayalam and Hindi and released on the same day.

== Reception ==
M. Suganth of The Times of India gave 3 out of 5 and wrote, "The film might entertain kids, but for the adults who accompany them, it might engage only in parts because of the uneven narration". S. Subhakeerthana of The Indian Express gave 3 out of 5 and said, "An enjoyable children's film that will leave you with a smile". Sify stated, "Thumbaa is a film which will be surely enjoyed by kids but the makers failed to attract all age group audiences mainly because of the weak writing".
