= Konjam Pesinaal Yenna =

- Theatrical release poster
- Directed by: Giri Murphy
- Written by: Giri Murphy
- Produced by: Sameer Bharat Ram
- Starring: Vinoth Kishan; Keerthi Pandian
- Cinematography: Lenin
- Edited by: Dhanasekar E
- Music by: Deepan Chakravarthy
- Release date: 23 May 2024
- Country: India
- Language: Tamil

Konjam Pesinaal Yenna (transl. So what if you speak a little?) is a 2024 Indian Tamil-language romantic comedy film written and directed by Giri Murphy. The film features Vinoth Kishan and Keerthi Pandian in lead roles. Produced by Sameer Bharat Ram, the film was shot in Chennai under Super Talkies. The music of the film is composed by Deepan Chakravarthy. The film began production in February 2021 and ended in February 2023. It was released on 23 May 2024.

== Plot ==
Sanjana, whose dormant feelings for her childhood crush, Ajay, are reignited when they meet again virtually. Despite not confessing her past emotions, the two make phone conversations during the lockdown and begin to form a new bond without attaching any traditional relationship labels to it. However, their journey towards acknowledging their feelings is fraught with challenges typical of any love story.

== Cast ==
- Vinoth Kishan as Ajay
- Keerthi Pandian as Sanjana
- Gowtham Sundararajan
- VJ Ashiq
- Kaamna Batra
- Akash Premkumar
- Sharai Benny
- Dharani Reddy
- Rajshree Rajan
- Sharmila

== Production ==
In February 2021, it was announced that Sameer Bharat Ram would produce a film initially called as Production No. 11 starring Vinoth Kishan and Keerthi Pandian. In April 2022, the film's title was revealed to be Konjam Pesinaal Yenna. It was further reported that Lenin is the director of cinematography, while Akash and Nazrem Sam are the art directors. Dhanasekar is the film editor, while the costume design is by Riya and Jaiwanti.

Keerthi Pandian and Vinoth Kishan were selected to play the lead roles in the film in March 2021, where the former will be seen as a fashion designer and the latter as an artist. Giri Murphy, the director of the film, explains that the film is a feel-good rom-com. Both the characters have beautiful pasts, and the film shows how they get connected in the present and how their love goes on. There are two shades shown in the film. One portion would be a school portion one-sided love. And then the second portion would be a present love between the two protagonists. Filming began in February 2021, and wrapped a year later, in February 2022.

== Soundtrack ==
The music is composed by Deepan Chakravarthy. A single "Tholaigiren Naan Tholaigiren" released on 18 November 2022.

== Reception ==
Roopa Radhakrishnan of The Times of India rated two point five out of five and stated that "Konjam Pesinaal Yenna is an easy breezy watch as long as it just follows the leads’ love story and doesn't try to be too inventive just for the sake of it or doesn't have a mother give a forceful lecture to her daughter." Jayabhuvaneshwari B of Cinema Express rated one point five out of five and wrote that "When the film neared its climax, I wondered if it would have made better sense to release it during or immediately after the pandemic"
