= Nalam Nalamariya Aaval =

- Title card
- Directed by: P. Jayadevi
- Written by: S. Gajendrakumar (dialogues)
- Screenplay by: P. Jayadevi
- Produced by: Hariprasad
- Starring: Mohan; Saritha
- Cinematography: V. Prabhakar
- Edited by: T. Thirunavukarasu
- Music by: Shyam
- Production company: Thulasi Arts
- Release date: 27 April 1984
- Country: India
- Language: Tamil

Nalam Nalamariya Aaval (transl. Desire to be Healthy) is a 1984 Indian Tamil-language film directed and co-written by P. Jayadevi in her debut. The film stars Mohan and Saritha. It was released on 27 April 1984.

== Cast ==
- Mohan as Krishna
- Saritha as Thulasi
- Kallapetti Singaram
- Rocket Ramanathan
- Oru Viral Krishna Rao
- Hanumanthu
- Usilai Mani
- Kullamani
- Thayirvadai Desikan
- Kulla Nataraj
- C. I. D. Sakunthala
- Devika Rani
- Vijaya Malini
- Hemalatha
- Suganthi
- Vasantha
- Kanchana
- Sumathi
- Sulochana
- Premalatha

== Production ==
Nalam Nalamariya Aaval is the directorial debut of Jayadevi. She also wrote the screenplay, while the dialogues were written by debutant S. Gajendrakumar. The film was originally titled Anandham Indru Aarambam.

== Soundtrack ==
The music was composed by Shyam.

Track listing
No.	Title	Lyrics	Singer(s)	Length
1.	"Nalla Sethi"	Vaali	S. P. Balasubrahmanyam, S. Janaki
2.	"Kaathu Sooda"	Vaali	S. P. Balasubrahmanyam, S. Janaki
3.	"Ennodu Yen Mounam"	Vairamuthu	P. Susheela, Kousalya and chorus
4.	"Kobam Yeno Kanna"	Gangai Amaran	P. Susheela, Unni Menon

== Release and reception ==
Nalam Nalamariya Aaval was released on 27 April 1984. Jayamanmadhan (a duo) of Kalki praised the acting of Mohan and Saritha and in regards to Shyam's music, they felt title song sounded like school player song but praised other songs. The duo praised Gajendrakumar's dialogues in the latter half of the film but panned him for writing dialogues which will be censored and they praised Jayadevi for placing her name at a crucial point but felt certain scenes were shot in amateurish manner and concluded she is better than other directors who have no script and expecting more in her upcoming films.
