= Arun Pandian =

Indian actor and filmmaker

Member of the Tamil Nadu Legislative Assembly
- In office 23 May 2011 – 21 February 2016
- Preceded by: M. V. R. Veera Kabilan
- Succeeded by: M. Govindarasu
- Constituency: Peravurani

Personal details
- Born: Arun Pandian Chellaiah; 13 July 1958 (age 68) Batticaloa, Dominion of Ceylon
- Party: All India Anna Dravida Munnetra Kazhagam
- Other political affiliations: Desiya Murpokku Dravida Kazhagam
- Spouse: Vijaya (m. 1982)
- Children: 3 including Keerthi Pandian
- Relatives: Ramya Pandian (niece), Ashok Selvan (Son-in-law)
- Occupation: Actor, director, producer, politician

Arun Pandian is an Indian politician and Actor from Tamil Nadu, India. He is a member of the Tamil Nadu Legislative Assembly from Peravurani Assembly constituency, representing the Desiya Murpokku Dravida Kazhagam.

He is the secretary of South Indian Film Financiers Association (Siffa) and he is also the president of South Indian Film Exporters Association (Sifea).

== Politics ==
He became a Member of Legislative Assembly in 2011 after contesting in the Tamil Nadu Legislative Assembly election as a Desiya Murpokku Dravida Kazhagam (DMDK) candidate for the constituency of Peravurani. On 21 February 2016, Arun Pandian and nine other MLAs tendered their resignations prior to the Assembly election in the state. On 25 February 2016, he joined the All India Anna Dravida Munnetra Kazhagam (AIADMK) in the presence of party general secretary and the then Tamil Nadu chief minister Jayalalithaa.

== Family and education ==
Arun Pandian was born on 13 July 1958 as the son of retired Lieutenant colonel D. P. Chellaiah and resides in Tirunelveli. His late brother C. Durai Pandian directed the film Uzhiyan (1994) with Arun Pandian starring in the lead role. He has three daughters including Kavitha Pandian (who worked as a producer) and Keerthi Pandian. He holds a Bachelors in economics from Madras University. His daughter Keerthi and his niece Ramya Pandian are working as actresses.

== Filmography ==
=== Tamil films ===
Year	Film	Role	Notes
1982	Ilanjodigal		
1985	Chidambara Rahasiyam	Arun	
1986	Oomai Vizhigal	Vijay	
1987	Vilangu	Babu	
1987	Oor Kuruvi	Vasanth	
1990	Inaindha Kaigal	Major David Kumar	
1991	Adhikari	Duraipandi IRS	Dubbed into Telugu as Customs Officer
1992	Kottai Vaasal	Velu, Sendhoorapandi	Dual roles
1993	Mutrugai	Balakrishnan	Dubbed into Telugu as Lakshyam
1994	Uzhiyan	Thilakan	Dubbed into Telugu as Indian Citizen
1995	Asuran	DSP Prasad	Dubbed into Telugu as Commando
1995	Raja Muthirai	Rajkumar IPS	
1996	Thayagam	Bayilvan	Extended Guest Appearance
1996	Aavathum Pennale Azhivathum Pennale	DCP Anthony IPS	Dubbed into Telugu as Adhikari
1996	Thuraimugam	Johnny	
1997	Roja Malare	Arun	
1997	Kadavul	Thamizharasan	Dubbed into Telugu as Shakti
1998	Aasai Thambi	Vinodh	
1998	Urimai Por	ACP Raja Yesu Mohamed	
1999	Sivan	ACP Alex IPS	
2000	Independence Day	SP Subhash IPS	
2000	Veeranadai	Kottaisamy	
2000	Puratchikkaaran	Anbu	
2001	Rishi	Sathyan	
2001	Kaatrukkenna Veli	LTTE soldier	
2002	Devan	Alex Devan (Jackson)	Also director
2003	Vikadan	Inspector Selvakumar	Also director
2006	Thirupathi	ACP Murali	
2006	Kovai Brothers	Dr. Gnanasekaran	
2008	Inba	Mala Ganesan	
2008	Madurai Ponnu Chennai Paiyan	Visa's uncle	
2010	Thambi Arjuna	Chief Minister	
2010	Virudhagiri	Franklin Williams	
2015	Savaale Samaali	Himself	Cameo appearance
2021	Anbirkiniyal	Sivam	
2022	Aadhaar	Yusuf	
2022	Trigger	SI Sathya Moorthy	
2024	Athomugam	Indrajith	Cameo Appearance
2024	Demonte Colony 2	Dr. Richard	
2025	Akkenam	Pandian	
2025	Right	Sakthivel Pandian	

=== Films in other languages ===
Year	Film	Role	Language	Notes
1992	Prema Shikharam	Anthony	Telugu	Dubbed into Tamil as Rojakkal Unakkaga
1993	Dhadi	Sivaji	Telugu	Dubbed into Tamil as Police Attack
1993	Nakshathra Poratam	Bhagath	Telugu	Dubbed into Tamil as Nakshatra Poratam
1994	Anokha Premyudh	Anthony	Hindi	
1994	Neram	Shankar Dada	Telugu	
1994	Dongala Rajyam	Surendran	Telugu	Dubbed into Tamil as Chinna Durai Periya Durai
1994	Nyaya Rakshana		Telugu	
1996	Aayudha	Daniel	Kannada	Dubbed into Tamil as Thilagavathi CBI; Dubbed into Telugu as CID
1997	Hai Bangalore	Vasudev	Kannada	Dubbed into Tamil as Time Bomb; Dubbed into Telugu as Political Encounter
1997	Jackie Chan	ACP Simha	Kannada	Dubbed into Tamil and Telugu as Jackie Chan
1997	Akka	Inspector Ajay	Kannada	Dubbed into Tamil as Commissioner Ajay
1997	Central Jail	Prathap	Kannada	
1997	Lady Commissioner	Suraj	Kannada	Dubbed into Tamil as Kiran I.P.S
1997	Lady Tiger		Kannada	Dubbed into Tamil as Lady Tiger
1997	Yuva Shakthi	Yuvaraj	Kannada	Dubbed into Tamil as Pulanaivu Thurai
1998	Amar Akbar Anthony	Anthony	Kannada	Dubbed into Tamil as Rowdy Vamsam; Dubbed into Telugu as Rowdy Vamsham
1998	King	Chandrahasa	Kannada	
1999	Naga Sakthi	Dhanush	Telugu	Dubbed into Tamil as Naga Devi
1999	Police	Vijay	Telugu	Dubbed into Tamil as No. 1 Police
1999	The Killer	Gowda	Kannada	Dubbed into Tamil as Kakki Chattaya Karuppu Chattaya
2000	Independence Day	SP Subhash	Kannada	
2000	Nagulamma	Veeranna	Telugu	Dubbed into Tamil as Nagathamman
2000	Ee Tharam Nehru	CBI Officer Ranjith Kumar	Telugu	
2000	Sradha	Dr. Lucifer Munna	Malayalam	Dubbed into Tamil as Dhool Police
2001	Orey Thammudu		Telugu	
2003	Daali		Kannada	
2005	Dhairyam	Police inspector	Telugu	
2007	Challenge	Arun	Telugu	

=== As producer ===
Year	Movie	Language
1988	Senthoora Poove	Tamil
1992	Kaviya Thalaivan	Tamil
2002	Devan	Tamil
2003	Vikadan	Tamil
2008	Aegan	Tamil
2009	Sarvam	Tamil
2009	Peraanmai	Tamil
2009	Villu	Tamil
2010	Angadi Theru	Tamil
2010	Nandalala	Tamil
2012	Murattu Kaalai	Tamil
2015	Savaale Samaali	Tamil
2017	Kalavaadiya Pozhuthugal	Tamil
2018	Junga	Tamil
2021	Anbirkiniyaal	Tamil

=== As story writer ===
- Uzhiyan (1993)

=== As distributor ===
- Sakka Podu Podu Raja (2017)
- Velaikkaran (2017)
- Maayavan (2017)
- Sarkar (2018)
- Viswasam (2019)
- Romeo (2024)
