= Anbirkiniyal =

2021 film by Gokul

- Theatrical release poster
- Directed by: Gokul
- Based on: Helen by Mathukutty Xavier
- Produced by: Arun Pandian; Alankar Pandian
- Starring: Keerthi Pandiyan; Arun Pandian; Praveen Raja
- Cinematography: Mahesh Muthuswami
- Edited by: Pradeep E. Ragav
- Music by: Javed Riaz
- Production companies: A&P Groups; Invenio Origin
- Distributed by: Sakthi Film Factory
- Release date: 5 March 2021
- Running time: 124 minutes
- Country: India
- Language: Tamil

Anbirkiniyal is a 2021 Indian Tamil-language survival thriller film directed by Gokul and produced by Arun Pandiyan and Alankar Pandian. A remake of the Malayalam film Helen (2019), it stars Arun's daughter Keerthi in the titular role, alongside her father and Praveen Raja. In the plot, Anbirkiniyal accidentally gets locked in a freezer room and fights to stay alive. The film began production in February 2020 and was released in theatres on 5 March 2021.

== Plot ==
Anbirkiniyal Sivam, nicknamed Anbu, is a BSc Nursing graduate and attends IELTS coaching classes intended for a job in Canada. She works part-time at The Chicken Hub, a fried chicken fast food restaurant in a shopping mall, to pay off her father, Sivam's debts. One night, while Anbu's boyfriend, Charles Sebastian, is driving her home, they are stopped by police, who penalise Charles for drunken driving and not wearing a helmet; both are brought to the police station. Sivam too is summoned to the station; he is in dismay at seeing his daughter and does not talk to her despite her several attempts at creating conversation.

One night, Anbu has no one to drop her off home from work. She tries to call Sivam, but he is still angry with her. Her workmates are told by their manager to put some stocks in the freezer room, which they ask Anbu to do. When closing for the night, the manager unknowingly locks Anbu in the freezer, where the temperature is −18 °C (0 °F). Unaware of Anbu's predicament, Charles and Sivam search for her, while Anbu fights to stay alive and not die from freezing. The security guard at the front of the mall tells the police that Anbu did not leave the mall. They start looking for her and eventually find her almost dead in the freezer. Anbu survives and is hospitalised. Sivam thanks the security guard, who tells Sivam that Anbu was the only one who would smile and wave at him.

== Cast ==
- Keerthi Pandiyan as Anbirkiniyal Sivam (Anbu)
  - Driya as young Anbirkiniyal Sivam
- Arun Pandian as Sivam
- Praveen Raja as Charles Sebastian
- Gokul as the prisoner
- Boopathy Raja as the manager of The Chicken Hub
- Ravindra Vijay as Ravindran
- Jayaraj Kozhikode as the mall's security guard
- Adinad Sasi as the head constable

== Production ==
In January 2020, it was reported that Arun Pandian would be remaking the Malayalam film Helen (2019), with his daughter Keerthi starring. The film would be his comeback after a long sabbatical, and Keerthi's second film as an actress after Thumbaa (2019). It was directed by Gokul, and co-produced by Arun's other daughter, Kavita, under A&P Groups. The film is Gokul's fifth as director, and the first one not based on an original idea. Mathukutty Xavier, director of the Malayalam original, was offered to direct the remake but refused since he was unable to agree with the changes the producers needed. Jayaraj Kozhikode, who played the security guard in the original, reprised his role. The cinematography was handled by Mahesh Muthusamy, and editing was done by Pradeep E. Ragav. Principal photography began in February 2020. The film was near completion as of August 2020. Filming was complete by February 2021, and the title Anbirkiniyal was announced on 15 February.

== Soundtrack ==
The music was composed by Javed Riaz, with lyrics by Lalithanand.

Track listing
No.	Title	Singer(s)	Length
1.	"Un Koodave"	Prarthana Indrajith	2:28
2.	"Sanjaaram"	Sid Sriram	3:52
3.	"Aanakatti"	Sriram Parthasarathy	4:03
4.	"Deivangal"	Sathyaprakash	3:08
5.	"Andraadam"	Prarthana Indrajith	2:28
Total length:			15:59

== Release ==
A press screening for Anbirkiniyal was held on 27 February 2021 at Chennai. The film was released in theatres on 5 March 2021, and was distributed by Sakthi Film Factory in Tamil Nadu. It began streaming on Amazon Prime Video from 4 April 2021.

=== Critical reception ===
M. Suganth of The Times of India praised Anbirkiniyal for its faithfulness to Helen, noting that director Gokul was "content with ensuring that the emotional beats and the thriller elements of the original are transferred competently. The end result is a film that might not match the intensity of the original, but manages to be a compelling watch, especially for those who might not have watched the original". Sify too praised the remake's faithfulness to the original, but said, "Though the remake falls short of the original in the first half, the thriller portions in the second half work well [...] Technically too, the film has matched the original and all the actors have done their parts well." Navein Darshan of Cinema Express rated the film 3 stars out of 5, saying, "The solid supporting cast compensates for the unconvincing lead performances in the beginning. They hold the film together". Ranjani Krishnakumar of Firstpost rated it 3.5 stars out of 5, saying "Despite its shortcomings, Anbirkiniyal is a delightful story of a survivor. One that offers hope that with a little effort, all can be good in the world." Critic Malini Mannath wrote, "For those who have watched the earlier version the reboot may seem a tad underwhelming. But for a first-time viewer it could be a refreshing experience."

=== Accolades ===
At the 10th South Indian International Movie Awards, Keerthi Pandian was nominated for the award for Best Actress – Tamil, the film's only nomination at the ceremony.
