= Dheena (actor) =

Indian actor

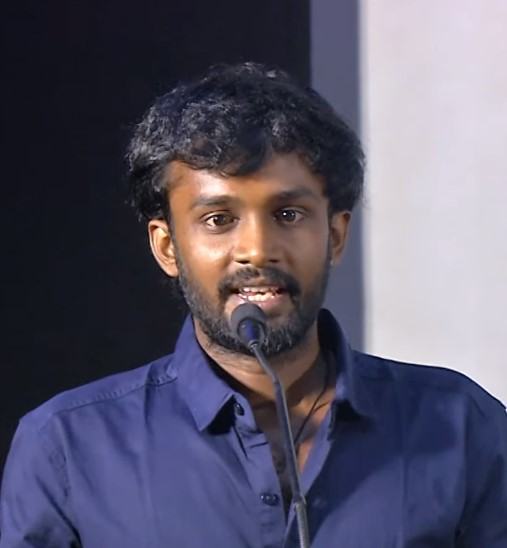
- Dheena in 2019 at Thumbaa press meet
- Born: Dinesh M 27 January 1990 (age 36); Thiruvarur, Tamil Nadu, India
- Other names: KPY Dheena, Prank Dheena, Vijay TV Dheena
- Occupations: Film actor, comedian, scriptwriter, Anchor
- Years active: 2015–present
- Spouse: Pragathi (m. 2023)

Dheena (born 27 January 1990) is an Indian actor, comedian and screenwriter who works prominently in Tamil films. He is known for playing one of the lead roles in the films Thumbaa (2019), Kaithi (2019) and Master (2021) and as a contestant in the television show Kalakka Povathu Yaaru?.

== Career ==
Dheena was a contestant in the show Kalakka Povathu Yaaru? on Vijay TV. He was known for his "prank calls" where proclaimed himself as a fan of Thadi Balaji and made fun of the judges and contestants. He made his film debut in Dhanush's Pa. Pandi essaying the role of Dhanush's friend. In 2019, he made his debut as a lead actor in Thumbaa. In a Times of India review of the film, the reviewer stated that he made "an assured comic performance". In 2019, he played a comedic role in Kaithi. Regarding his role, Janani K of India Today stated that "Dheena’s role brings in a much-needed lightness to the film". He was last seen in the film Master. His next film as a lead actor was supposed to be the film Ajith From Aruppukottai. The film is a remake of Kattappanayile Rithwik Roshan and will be produced by Dhanush.

== Television ==
Show	Role	Channel	Notes	Ref.
Super Singer 10	Guest	Vijay TV		
Kalakka Povathu Yaaru?	Contestant	Vijay TV	Finalist	
Enkitta Modhaade	Host	Vijay TV	Second Season	
Sirippuda	Contestant	Vijay TV		
Athu Ithu Ethu	Scriptwriter	Vijay TV		
Ready Steady Po	Contestant	Vijay TV	One episode	
90's kids vs 2K kids	Contestant	Vijay TV	One episode	
BB Jodigal	Host	Vijay TV		
Bigg Boss Ultimate season 1	Guest	Vijay TV		
Top Cooku Dupe Cooku	Dupe Cooku	Sun TV		
Mama Manasilaayo	Co-Host	Sun TV		

== Filmography ==
=== Film ===
- All films are in Tamil, unless otherwise noted.

Key
†	Denotes films that have not yet been released

Year	Title	Role	Notes
2017	Pa. Pandi	Mani	
2019	Kuttram Seiyel	Roopan	Malaysian-Tamil film
2019	Thumbaa	Umapathy	
2019	Kaithi	Kamatchi	
2019	50/50	Sethu's friend	
2021	Master	Inmate	
2021	Pulikkuthi Pandi	Pandi's friend	Premiered on Sun TV
2022	Anbarivu	Dheena	
2022	Vikram	Kamatchi	Cameo appearance
2022	Radha Krishna		Premiered on Colors Tamil
2022	Udanpaal	Parthiban	
2024	Marakkuma Nenjam	Salim	
2024	Kalvan	Soori	
2025	House Mates	Senthil	
2025	Diesel	Gokul	
2025	Friday		
2026	O.M: Operation Mole †	TBA	

== Awards and nominations ==
Year	Award	Category	Result	Notes
2017	Vijay Television Awards	Best Solo Comedian	Won	
2017	Vijay Television Awards	Best Comedian Duo Non Fiction	Nominated	along with Sarath
2020	Behindwoods Gold Icons	Most Promising Star - Television to Big Screen	Won	
2021	South Indian International Movie Awards	SIIMA Award for Best Comedian - Tamil	Nominated	
