= Uzhiyan =

- Directed by: C. Durai Pandian
- Written by: C. Dhinakaran (dialogues)
- Screenplay by: C. Durai Pandian
- Story by: Arun Pandian
- Produced by: Lakshmikaran
- Starring: Arun Pandian; Vineetha
- Cinematography: Mohanji
- Edited by: S. Pari Vallal
- Music by: Manoj Saran
- Production company: Lakshmikaran Enterprises
- Release date: 4 March 1994
- Running time: 125 minutes
- Country: India
- Language: Tamil

Uzhiyan (transl. Worker) is a 1994 Indian Tamil-language action drama film directed by actor Arun Pandian's brother C. Durai Pandian. The film stars Arun Pandian and Vineetha, with Sarath Babu, Mansoor Ali Khan, Janagaraj, Mohan Natarajan, Geetha, Vijaya Chandrika and Dakshayini playing supporting roles. It was released on 4 March 1994.

== Plot ==
The film starts with Thilakan (Arun Pandian) running away from soldiers. According to witnesses, he tried to attack high-ranking military officers and then fled with military weapons. Thilakan is now wanted by the army. His superiors find out that he ran away to find his sister, who was reported missing. His superior officer Anakkal Raj (Sarath Babu) describes him as an honest and brave soldier and convinces his superiors to give him the case. Afterwards, Anakkal Raj and the soldiers trace him in the forest, but he escapes thanks to Kanaka (Vineetha). Interrogated by Anakkal Raj, Kanaka reveals the reason behind her action.

In the past, Thilakan lived with his only sister Meena (Dakshayini) and mother (Vijaya Chandrika) in the village Kurinji. He dreamed of becoming a soldier, and the village belle Kanaka was in love with him. In Kurinji, the villagers did not have enough water for agriculture. They even reported to the district collector (Geetha) about this issue, but she refused to release more water from Mettur Dam. They explained that the local MLA Govindaraj (Mansoor Ali Khan) used all the water for his cannabis plantation. The DC then ordered Govindaraj to release the water, but he refused. On Independence Day, Govindaraj, the chief guest, appeared drunk at Meena's college. When Govindaraj tried to hoist the Indian flag, Thilakan stopped him and let a Gandhian hoist it, which irked Govindaraj. Thilakan then joined the army. A university conferred an honorary doctorate on Govindaraj at the grand function. However, Govindaraj behaved badly towards the DC, and she slapped him in front of the public. The next day, Govindaraj's henchman threw acid on the DC's face. Meena, who was with her and witnessed the attack, ran away from the killer. Since that day, Meena has been sequestered by Govindaraj and his friend Subramani (Mohan Natarajan).

Anakkal Raj finally catches Thilakan, and he is imprisoned at the military camp. However, Thilakan manages to escape. What transpires next forms the rest of the story.

== Cast ==
- Arun Pandian as Thilakan
- Vineetha as Kanaka
- Sarath Babu as Anakkal Raj
- Mansoor Ali Khan as Govindaraj
- Janagaraj as Manickam
- Mohan Natarajan as Subramani
- Geetha as District collector
- Vijaya Chandrika as Thilakan's mother
- Dakshayini as Meena
- Raghu Babu as Subramani's henchman
- King Kong
- Chitti as Police officer
- Tirupur Ramasamy
- Singamuthu
- Vengal Rao as Subramani's henchman
- C. Dinakaran as Govindaraj's assistant

== Soundtrack ==
The soundtrack was composed by Manoj Saran, with lyrics written by the film director R. Aravindraj.

Song	Singer(s)	Duration
"Ellorkkum Nallavan"	S. P. Balasubrahmanyam, B. S. Sasirekha, Minmini	4:59
"Chinna Chinna Sandangalai"	Mano	4:59
"Jilu Jilu Paapa"	S. P. Balasubrahmanyam, Arun Pandian, Minmini	5:08
"Vaa Rasa Va Rasa"	Janagaraj, Minmini	4:58
"Kankakkum Imaiyum"	Mano	3:55
