= Gokul (director) =

Indian film director and screenwriter

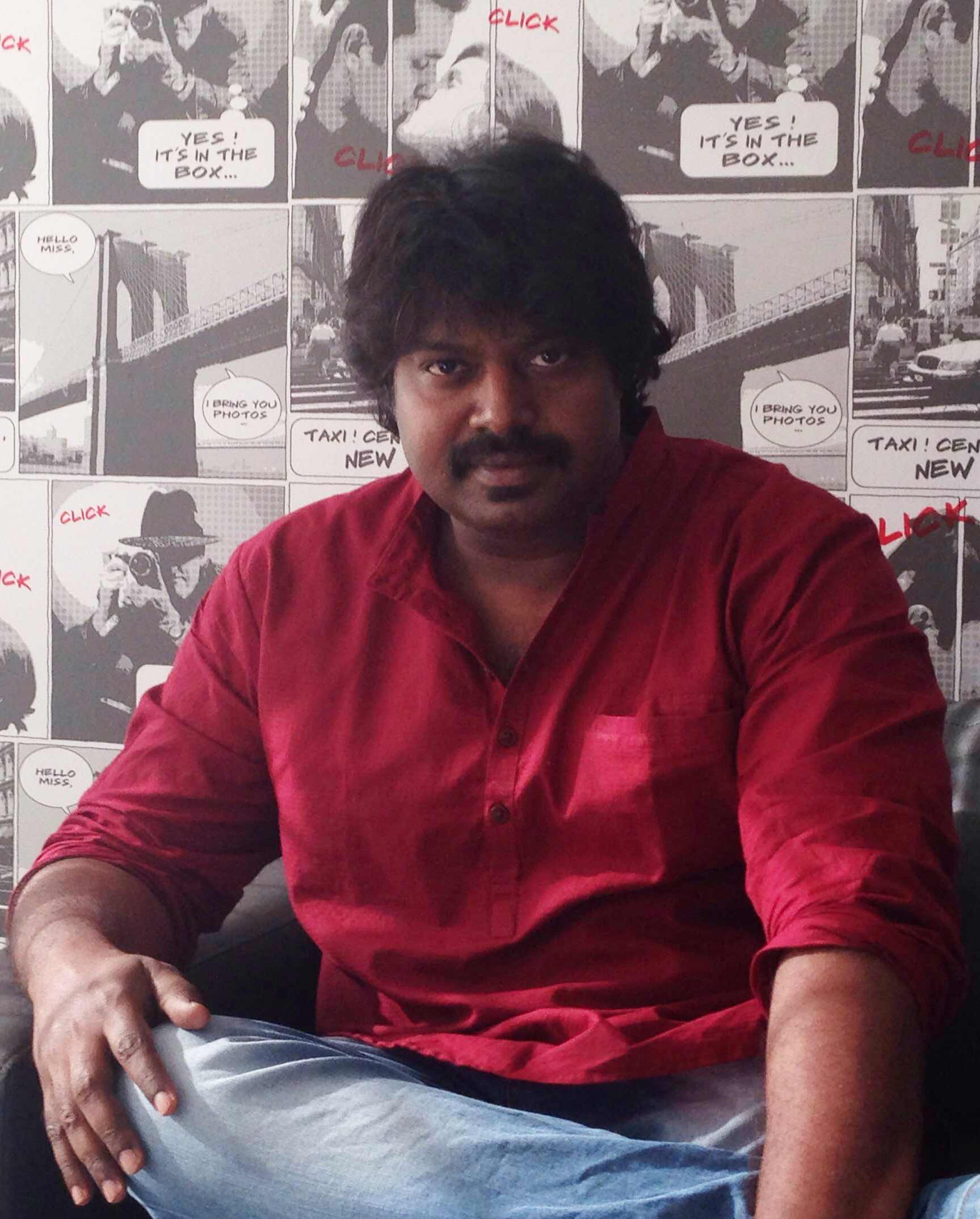
- Born: Gokul; Chennai, Tamil Nadu, India
- Education: Dr. Ambedkar Government Law College, Chennai
- Occupations: Film director, Screenwriter
- Years active: 2011 – present

Gokul is an Indian film director and screenwriter who works in Tamil cinema. He is known for making films such as Rowthiram, Idharkuthane Aasaipattai Balakumara, Kaashmora, and Anbirkiniyal.

== Career ==
Gokul's maiden venture, Rowthiram (2011), featured Jiiva and Shriya Saran in the lead roles. The movie earned praise for its cinematography and stunt choreography. In 2012, the movie was dubbed in Telugu with the climax changed.

His second movie, Idharkuthane Aasaipattai Balakumara (2013), produced by Leo Visions, was a comedy film and featured a cast including Vijay Sethupathi, Ashwin Kakumanu, Swathi Reddy, Nandita Swetha, Pasupathy, and Soori. The movie won accolades for its quirky dialogues. His next work was the horror film Kaashmora (2016) which featured Karthi in multiple getups. Similar to his first two films, the film was a success.

He collaborated again with Vijay Sethupathi for Junga (2018), which was mostly shot in France. In 2020, he announced Corona Kumar, a spin-off of Idharkuthane Aasaipattai Balakumara. Silambarasan was announced as the hero in 2021 and received a ₹1 crore advance. In 2024, Gokul revealed that he is yet to find a hero for the film and that he has to discuss with Vijay Sethupathi about the film. He worked on a film with RJ Balaji titled Singapore Saloon (2024), an underdog story about a barber. His next film with Vishnu Vishal was announced in January 2024.

== Filmography ==
Year	Film	Notes			
Year	Film	Notes	2011	Rowthiram	Also actor
2013	Idharkuthane Aasaipattai Balakumara				
2016	Kaashmora				
2018	Junga				
2021	Anbirkiniyal	Also actor; Remake of Helen			
2024	Singapore Saloon				
