= Rettaisuzhi =

2010 Indian Tamil film written and directed by Thamira

- Theatrical release poster
- Directed by: Thamira
- Written by: Thamira; Nallaan Thamizh
- Produced by: Shankar
- Starring: K. Balachander; Bharathiraja; Anjali; Aari Arujunan
- Cinematography: Chezhiyan
- Edited by: Mu. Kasivishwanathan
- Music by: Karthik Raja
- Production company: S Pictures
- Release date: 23 April 2010
- Country: India
- Language: Tamil

Rettaisuzhi (transl. Double hair whorls) is a 2010 Indian Tamil-language drama film written and directed by Thamira in his directorial debut. It stars filmmakers K. Balachander and Bharathiraja along with Anjali, Aari Arujunan, Jayachitra, Karunas, Manobala, and Ilavarasu in supporting roles. The film was released on 23 April 2010.

== Plot ==
In a village in Tirunelveli, Ramasamy is an influential man and a devoted follower of the principles of Congress since childhood. He is against Singaravelan, a communist. Their feud runs for over four decades. Even their grandchildren are against each other and they form gangs to express their enmity. However, a romance in the family changes the warm atmosphere. Susheela, brought up in Singaravelan's house, is a school teacher who is in love with Murthy. Understanding their true love, the children forget their enmity and try to bring both families together and get them married. Whether they succeed in their attempts forms the climax.

== Cast ==
- K. Balachander as Ramaswamy
- Bharathiraja as Singaravelan
- Aari Arujunan as Murthy
- Anjali as Susheela
- Jayachitra as Murthy's mother
- Manobala
- Karunas
- Ilavarasu
- Leema Babu as Singaravelan's granddaughter
- Kambam Meena as Singaravelan's daughter-in-law
- Rinson Simon as Young Murthy

== Soundtrack ==
The soundtrack was composed by Karthik Raja. He acknowledged one song's visuals and beats were inspired by Michael Jackson's "Stranger in Moscow", but the song was otherwise original. The audio was launched by Aishwarya Rai Bachchan on 16 March 2010. Karthik of Milliblog wrote, "Karthikraja's work in Rettaisuzhi sounds like a pale imitation of his own limited, glory days".

Track listing
| No. | Title | Lyrics | Singer(s) | Length |
|---|---|---|---|---|
| 1. | "Bum Bum Bumbara Kaathu" | Palani Bharathi | Violin Padma, Rita | 5:09 |
| 2. | "Pattaalam Paaruda" | V. Ramasamy | Powshya Sundar, Armaan Malik, Sarvan | 4:26 |
| 3. | "Naan Endru Sol" (Version 1) | Chandra Thangaraj | Hariharan, Haricharan, Sriram Parthasarathy | 4:22 |
| 4. | "Poochandi Kannazhagi" (Version 1) | Annamalai | Bellie Raj, Rita | 4:08 |
| 5. | "Para Para Kili" | Palani Bharathi | Deepa Miriam, Rahul Nambiar | 5:06 |
| 6. | "Poochandi Kannazhagi" (Version 2) | Annamalai | Hariharan, Shreya Ghoshal | 4:08 |
| 7. | "Naan Endru Sol" (Version 2) | Chandra Thangaraj | Hariharan | 4:21 |
| Total length: | | | | 31:40 |

== Critical reception ==
Bhama Devi Ravi of The Times of India rated the film 2.5 out of 5 stars. Sify wrote, "Rettachuzhi is un-involving as the director is clueless and most of the time is totally confused on what he wants to say". The New Indian Express wrote, "Fairly neatly crafted, Rettai Suzhi is a clean, simple, warm entertainer sans overt glamour, double entendres or mindless violence". Malathi Rangarajan of The Hindu wrote, "Rettachchuzhi has its share of pluses … and minuses too. Some of the actors lack spontaneity. For the lay viewer who prefers to have the story moving at a reasonable speed, certain parts of the film are patience-testers".
