= Melody (2015 film) =

2015 Kannada film

- Directed by: Nanjunda Krishna
- Screenplay by: S M Patil; Nanjunda Krishna
- Story by: Nanjunda Krishna
- Produced by: S Krishnamurthy
- Starring: Rajesh Krishnan; Karthika Menon; Chethan Gandharva; Akshatha Marla
- Cinematography: R V Nageshwar Rao
- Edited by: Vinod Manohar
- Music by: L. N. Shastri
- Production company: Sri Amba Bhagavathi Films
- Release date: 20 April 2015
- Country: India
- Language: Kannada

Melody is a 2015 Indian Kannada-language film directed by Nanjuda Krishna, starring Rajesh Krishnan, Karthika Menon, Chethan Gandharva and Akshatha Marla in lead roles.

== Plot ==
Kiran is a software engineer who falls in love with Anu. Since Kiran has no experience with women, his friend Madhu acts as Kiran on Facebook and befriends Anu. A confused Anu tells Kiran's friend Benny "to check on him".

== Cast ==
- Rajesh Krishnan as Kiran
- Karthika Menon as Anu
- Chethan Gandharva as Madhu
- Akshatha Marla as Benny
- Ramakrishna
- Mandya Ramesh
- Rockline Sudhakar
- Shamanth K Rao

== Production ==
The film marks the second collaboration between director Nanjuda Krishna and L. N. Shastri after Kanasalu Neene Manasalu Neene (1998). The film reportedly has 50 songs including bit songs during conversations of characters.

== Music ==
Melody

Soundtrack album by L. N. Shastry
- Released: 2015
- Recorded: 2015
- Genre: Feature film soundtrack
- Length: 22:15
- Language: Kannada

Official audio
- Melody - Full Album on YouTube

Track listing
No.	Title	Singer(s)	Length
1.	"Nannolage"	Rajesh Krishnan	5:03
2.	"Kyame Illada Kempa"	L. N. Shastry	4:07
3.	"Iddaroo Ondu Ooralli"	Rajesh Krishnan	4:46
4.	"Kaddu Nodide"	Chethan Gandharva, Suma Shastry	4:21
5.	"Gundu Olagodre"	L. N. Shastry, Rajesh Krishnan	4:38
Total length:			22:15

== Reception ==
=== Critical response ===
Shyam Prasad S of Bangalore Mirror scored the film at 3 out of 5 stars and says "Glamour is missing though the film is colourful. The film could also have been a bit crispier. Melody makes for a leisurely laidback watch". S Vishwanath of Deccan Herald wrote "Melody works wonderfully despite its pitfalls. Yes, as its tagline says, just love maadi, for it is as much a treat to youth as it is to the entire family". The Times of India scored the film at 3 out of 5 stars and says "Though Rajesh Krishnan and Kartika Menon have done well, it is Chethan Gandharva and Akshatha Marla who steal the show with their lively performance. Camera by RV Nageshwara Rao and music by L N Sastry are average". Sify wrote "The movie also lacks good music and good dialogues. With such award-winning singers on board, the team could have worked hard in upgrading the music of the film. Director Nanjunda Krishna has tried to apply ‘tele-serial formulae’ which has failed miserably!"
