= Adavadi =

- Poster
- Directed by: V. S. Bharath Hanna
- Written by: V. S. Bharath Hanna (dialogues)
- Screenplay by: V. S. Bharath Hanna
- Story by: Upendra
- Based on: A by Upendra
- Produced by: G. Saravana; R. Sekar
- Starring: Sathyaraj; Radha; Y. Gee. Mahendra; Sathyapriya; K. R. Vatsala; Vaiyapuri; Suja Varunee; Ganja Karuppu; Malaysia Vasudevan
- Cinematography: R. Judo Ashwin
- Edited by: K. Thangavel
- Music by: Deva
- Production company: Sri Saravana Film Arts
- Release date: 30 March 2007
- Running time: 140 minutes
- Country: India
- Language: Tamil

Adavadi is a 2007 Tamil language psychological thriller film written and directed by V. S. Bharath Hanna. The film stars Sathyaraj and Radha alongside an ensemble cast including Y. Gee. Mahendra, Sathyapriya, K. R. Vatsala, Vaiyapuri, Suja Varunee, Ganja Karuppu, and Malaysia Vasudevan. It was released on 30 March 2007. The film is a remake of the 1998 Kannada film A.

== Plot ==
Bharath (Sathyaraj) is a perfectionist film director. Being a short-tempered person, he deals with people arrogantly and rudely. Chandini (Radha), an actress making her film debut, falls in love with Bharath. When Chandini openly declares her love for Bharath in front of everyone, he gets angry and slaps her. Chandini distances herself from him and latches on to a financier. Bharath cannot forget her and takes to drinking. What transpires later forms the crux of the story.

== Cast ==
- Sathyaraj as Bharath
- Radha as Chandini
- Y. Gee. Mahendra as Bharath's father
- Sathyapriya as Bharath's mother
- K. R. Vatsala as Chandini's mother
- Vaiyapuri as Michael
- Suja Varunee
- Ganja Karuppu
- Malaysia Vasudevan
- Fathima Babu
- T. P. Gajendran
- Alex
- Parvesh
- Afzal
- Muthukaalai
- Telephone Subramanian
- Sharmili
- Kovai Senthil

== Production ==
After the commercially successful film Adi Thadi (2004), director Shivaraj (who has changed his name to Bharath Hanna) and Sathyaraj team up for the second time. Radha of Sundhara Travels fame was selected to play lead actress, while Deva was signed on as music composer. The film was originally titled as Reel No. 16 and was launched on 29 April 2006. The filming was held at Vishakapatnam in 37 days.

== Soundtrack ==
Adavadi

Soundtrack album by Deva
- Released: 12 January 2007
- Genre: Feature film soundtrack
- Length: 19:45
- Language: Tamil
- Label: Mass Audios

Deva chronology
Manikanda (2007)	Adavadi (2007)	Viyabari (2007)
External audio
- Adavadi – Jukebox on YouTube

The film score and the soundtrack were composed by Deva. The soundtrack, released on 12 January 2007, features 4 tracks with lyrics written by Snehan, Piraisoodan and Senthilkumar.

Deva retained two songs from original version which are composed by Gurukiran. "Idhu One Day" retained as "Idhu One Day" and "Sum Sumne" retained as "En Anbea".

Track listing
No.	Title	Lyrics	Singer(s)	Length
1.	"En Anbea"	Snehan	Karthik, Mrunalini	5:15
2.	"Idhu One Day"	Piraisoodan	Malaysia Maran, Babuji, Jayalakshmi	4:38
3.	"Dindugal Poottu"	Piraisoodan	Deva, Sri Devisha Bharath	5:25
4.	"Thisai Eattum"	Su. Senthilkumar	Sriram Parthasarathy	4:27
Total length:				19:45

== Reception ==
The film received mostly negative reviews. Settu Shankar of OneIndia described the film as a needless confusion. While KLT of hindu.com criticized the outmoded plot and treatment. Chennai Online wrote "The film is a remake of the Kannada hit 'A'. It had helped establish popular star Upendra as a director-hero with his own unique, zany and a bizarre style of scripting, characterisation and narrative style. Which doesn't work to advantage in the Tamil version. Rehashed, it loses out in its essence and comes across as a series of disjointed scenes put together in a jerky, haphazard way. matters".
