= Anusha (actress) =

Indian actress

Anusha Saravanan
- Born: Chennai
- Occupation: Film actress
- Years active: 1992-2005
- Spouse: Saravanan (m. 2007)
- Relatives: K. R. Savithri (mother); Ragasudha (sister); K. R. Vijaya (aunt); K. R. Vatsala (aunt)

Anusha is an Indian actress. She started her film career aged 13 and was one of the prominent lead actress in Malayalam, Telugu and Kannada movies in the 1990s and 2000s. She has also acted in Telugu serials later in her career.

== Personal life ==
She is the daughter of Tamil actress K. R. Savithri. Actress K. R. Vijaya is her aunt. She lives in Chennai with her family. She was a former basketball player at State levels. Anusha married Saravanan in June 2007.

== Filmography ==
| Year | Film | Role | Language | Notes |
|---|---|---|---|---|
| 1991 | Iddaru Pellala Muddula Police | Lalitha | Telugu | |
| 1991 | Mahayagnam | Anusha | Telugu | |
| 1992 | Navatare | Hema | Kannada | |
| 1992 | Agreement | Devi | Telugu | |
| 1992 | First Bell | Yamuna | Malayalam | |
| 1992 | Golmaal Govindam | Vijaya | Telugu | |
| 1992 | Thangarasu | Vijaya | Tamil | Debut in Tamil |
| 1992 | Kizhakku Veedhi | Karuppayi | Tamil | |
| 1992 | Welcome to Kodaikanal | Maya | Malayalam | |
| 1993 | Nagajyothi | Nagajyothi | Telugu | |
| 1993 | Kulapathi | Sukanya | Malayalam | |
| 1994 | Dollar | Tini | Malayalam | |
| 1994 | Vishnu | Model | Malayalam | |
| 1994 | Saaramsham | Radha | Malayalam | |
| 1994 | Padhavi | Sneha | Malayalam | |
| 1995 | Boxer | Home Minister's daughter | Malayalam | |
| 1995 | Kuruthipunal | Mala | Tamil | |
| 1995 | Chinna Mani | Princy | Tamil | |
| 1995 | Arabia | Bhairavi | Malayalam | |
| 1996 | Daanveer | Jyothi K Singh | Hindi | |
| 1996 | Drohi | Mala | Telugu | |
| 1996 | Sulthan Hyderali | Maneesha | Malayalam | |
| 1996 | Mimics Super 1000 | Gopika Varma | Malayalam | |
| 1996 | Pallivathuckal Thommichan | Alice | Malayalam | |
| 1996 | K.L. 7/95 Ernakulam North | Radha | Malayalam | |
| 1996 | Swarnakireedam | Sainabha | Malayalam | |
| 1996 | Naalaamkettile Nalla Thampimaar | Diana | Malayalam | |
| 1996 | Excuse Me Ethu Collegila? | Maya | Malayalam | |
| 1996 | Nattupura Pattu | Amaravathi | Tamil | |
| 1996 | Rajali | Lali | Tamil | |
| 1996 | Panchayat | Mallika | Kannada | |
| 1997 | Kalyanappittannu | Midhuna | Malayalam | |
| 1997 | Shobhanam | Mridula Menon | Malayalam | |
| 1997 | Mannadiar Penninu Chenkotta Checkan | Manju | Malayalam | |
| 1997 | Gajaraja Manthram | Gayathri | Malayalam | |
| 1997 | Bharatheeyam | Chandini | Malayalam | |
| 1997 | Adra Sakka Adra Sakka | Janu | Tamil | |
| 1998 | Glorya Fernandes from USA | Glorya | Malayalam | |
| 1998 | Unnidathil Ennai Koduthen | Special appearance | Tamil | |
| 1999 | Suryodayam | Amritha | Tamil | |
| 1999 | Rajasthan | Maheswari | Tamil | |
| 1999 | Rajasthan | Maheswari | Telugu | |
| 2000 | Baro Nanna Muddina Krishna | Radha | Kannada | |
| 2000 | Danda Nayaka | Prema | Kannada | |
| 2001 | Maafia | Revati | Kannada | |
| 2001 | Grama Devathe | Radha | Kannada | |
| 2001 | Kanoonu | Bharathi | Kannada | |
| 2001 | Goa | Daisy | Malayalam | |
| 2001 | Vadugapatti Mappilai | Deepa | Tamil | |
| 2001 | Narahanthaka | Shilpa | Kannada | |
| 2002 | Chiranjeevi | Radha | Kannada | |

== TV serials ==
- Gruhalakshmi (Telugu) as Lakshmi
- Ninne Pelladatha (Telugu) as Supraja
- Jayam (Telugu) as Seetha and Geetha
- Anubhandham (Telugu) as Anu
