= Ini Ellam Sugame =

- Directed by: A. R. Ramesh
- Screenplay by: A. R. Ramesh
- Story by: E. Ramdoss
- Produced by: A. L. Azhagappan
- Starring: Abbas; Sanghavi; Sruthi Raj
- Cinematography: S. Kumar
- Edited by: B. S. Vasu–Saleem
- Music by: Sirpy
- Production company: Valli Cine Arts
- Release date: 18 March 1998
- Running time: 130 minutes
- Country: India
- Language: Tamil

Ini Ellam Sugame is a 1998 Indian Tamil-language romance film directed by A. R. Ramesh. The film stars Abbas, Sanghavi and Sruthi Raj, with R. Sundarrajan, Jai Ganesh and K. R. Vatsala playing supporting roles. It was released on 18 March 1998.

== Plot ==
Aravind (Abbas) comes to Chennai to participate in a singing competition. During the competition, Aravind falls in love at first sight with the female spectator Nandhini (Sanghavi) and so does she. He eventually wins the first prize. Aravind and Nandhini want to meet and express their feelings.

Aravind decides to stay in Chennai to find Nandhini. Meanwhile, he befriends the clever Chennaite Mani (R. Sundarrajan) and his neighbour Nirmala (Shruthi Raj).

Nandhini heads an advertising company. Aravind is hired as a model in her company but Aravind and Nandhini don't express their love. With Aravind's help, Nirmala is also hired in Nandhini's company. Nirmala eventually falls in love with Aravind. What transpires later forms the crux of the story.

== Cast ==
- Abbas as Aravind
- Sanghavi as Nandhini
- Sruthi Raj as Nirmala
- R. Sundarrajan as Mani
- Jai Ganesh as Nandhini's father
- K. R. Vatsala as Nirmala's mother
- Pandu
- D. Rajan as Rajan
- Balu Anand
- Vasuki
- Ravishankar
- Sudhakar
- Idichapuli Selvaraj
- Tirupur Ramasamy
- Mannangatti Subramaniam
- Subramani
- Singamuthu
- Ramesh Prabha in a guest appearance
- Udhaya in a cameo appearance

== Production ==
The film was produced by A. L. Azhagappan. His son Udhaya under his original name Senthilkumar made his acting debut with this film appearing in a small role.

== Soundtrack ==
The soundtrack was composed by Sirpy.

Song	Singer(s)	Lyrics	Duration
"Ae Poongatru"	Mano, Swarnalatha	Arivumathi	4:29
"Kangalilae"	P. Unni Krishnan, K. S. Chithra	Palani Bharathi	5:05
"Devi Enakkaha"	Mano	Palani Bharathi	4:48
"Kudaigal Silirkkum"	Sumangali	Palani Bharathi	4:55
"Onna Iranda"	Mano, Sirpy	Kalidasan	5:24

== Reception ==
D. S. Ramanujam of The Hindu wrote, "A stale story, made staler by the slip-shod direction of A. R. Ramesh (``Thayagam″), who has also penned the screenplay, offers dull hours in Valli Cine Arts, ``Eni Ellam Sukamae″. The lead pair Sanghavi and Abbas just go through the movie, the latter still in the infancy stage of acting". Two years after release, the producers were given a ₹5 lakh (equivalent to ₹21 lakh or US$21,000 in 2023) subsidy by the Tamil Nadu government along with several other films.
