= K. R. Savithri =

Indian actress in Malayalam movies (born 1952)

- Born: 25 July 1952 (age 74); Thiruthani
- Occupation: Actress
- Years active: 1976-2008
- Children: Anusha; Ragasudha
- Relatives: K.R. Vijaya (sister); K.R. Vatsala (sister)

K. R. Savithri (born 25 July 1952) is an Indian actress in Malayalam movies. She is one of the prominent supporting actresses in Malayalam and Tamil movies. She was born at Thiruthani. Her father is Ramachandra Nair and mother is from Kerala. Actresses K. R. Vijaya and K. R. Vatsala are her sisters. Her daughters Anusha and Ragasudha are also actresses. She currently resides at Chennai with family.

== Filmography ==
=== Malayalam ===
Year	Title	Role	Notes
1976	Chuzhi		
1982	Aadharsam		
1983	Yudham	Malathy	
1983	Parasparam		
1985	Yathra		
1985	Sannaham	Gouriyamma	
1985	Saandham Bheekaram		
1985	Thammil Kandappol		
1986	Deshadanakkili Karayarilla		
1986	Gandhinagar 2nd Street		
1986	Snehamulla Simham		
1986	Padayani		
1986	Koodanayum Kattu		
1987	Sreedharante Onnaam Thirumurivu	Aswathy's mother	
1988	Anuragi		
1988	Ormayil Ennum		
1988	Oozham		
1989	Jeevitham Oru Raagam		
1990	Veena Meettiya Vilangukal		
1990	Samrajyam	Shah's wife	
1990	Mridula	Banumathiyamma	
1990	Vacation		
1991	Onnaam Muhurtham		
1991	Amaram		
1991	Bhoomika		
1992	Welcome to Kodaikanal	Aunty	
1992	Kudumbasametham	Rema	
1995	Arabia	Bhairavi's mother	
1996	Sulthan Hyderali	Arif Hussain's wife	
1997	Oru Yathramozhi		

=== Tamil ===
Year	Title	Role	Notes
1976	Punitha Anthoniyar		
1983	Kai Varisai		
1984	Andha June 16-Am Naal		
1984	En Uyir Nanban		
1987	Veeran Veluthambi		
1987	Cooliekkaran		
1988	Manaivi Oru Mandhiri		
1988	Aval Mella Sirithal		
1988	Sahadevan Mahadevan		
1988	Maduraikara Thambi		
1989	Sattathin Marupakkam		
1990	Thalattu Padava		
1990	Salem Vishnu		
1990	Agni Theertham		
1992	Thaali Kattiya Raasa		
1993	Pudhiya Mugam		
1995	Veluchami		
1996	Thuraimugam	Mangalam	
2003	Ilasu Pudhusu Ravusu		
2005	Selvam	Jyothy's mother	
2008	Ezhuthiyatharadi	Devi's mother	

=== Telugu ===
- Jagan (1984)

== Television ==
- Thendral (TV series)
