= Mava Mava Maduve Mado =

- Directed by: Arjun
- Written by: Arjun
- Produced by: J. Ashok Kumar
- Starring: Kashinath; Archana; Tarun; Ruthu
- Cinematography: Mallikarjuna
- Edited by: S. Prasad
- Music by: L. N. Shastri
- Production company: Ashok Films
- Release date: 8 February 2000
- Country: India
- Language: Kannada

Mava Mava Maduve Mado (transl. Father-in-law, Father-in-law get married) is a 2000 Indian Kannada-language comedy drama film directed by Arjun and starring Kashinath, Tarun, Archana and Ruthu.

== Cast ==
- Kashinath as Gopal
- Archana
- Tarun
- Ruthu
- Bank Janardhan
- Kunigal Nagabhushan
- Mico Seetharam
- Girija Lokesh
- Ravikala
- Ashalatha
- Michael Madhu
- Vishwas

== Soundtrack ==
Mava Mava Maduve Mado

Soundtrack album by L. N. Shastri
- Released: 14 April 2000
- Genre: Feature film soundtrack
- Length: 33:49
- Label: Mars Films

The music was composed by L. N. Shastri. The lyrics for the soundtrack were written by Arjun and K. Kalyan. The soundtrack album consist of nine tracks.

Track listing
| No. | Title | Singer(s) | Length |
|---|---|---|---|
| 1. | "Ee Hethordonde Drama" | Rajesh Krishnan, Mangala Ravi, Archana Udupa, Suma Shastri, L. N. Shastri, M. R. Ramesh | 4:15 |
| 2. | "Hakki Hakki" | Suresh Peters, L. N. Shastri | 4:33 |
| 3. | "Kaasilla Karimani Illa" | L. N. Shastri | 0:53 |
| 4. | "Maava Maava Maduve" | L. N. Shastri | 5:23 |
| 5. | "Marriage Andre" | L. N. Shastri | 1:44 |
| 6. | "Plastic Moldinga" | L. N. Shastri | 1:02 |
| 7. | "Sone Maleya Bennero" | Suma Shastri | 5:18 |
| 8. | "Sone Maleya Haniyella" | Suma Shastri, L. N. Shastri | 5:19 |
| 9. | "Usire Mellusire" | Rajesh Krishnan, Archana Udupa | 5:22 |
| Total length: | | | 33:49 |

== Reception ==
A critic from Deccan Herald wrote that "This flick is a big disappointment for Kashinath fans. Though the story-line is comical and sounds interesting, the film is drab with director Arjun completely losing his grip over the narration. Otherwise, Mava Mava Maduve Mado would have been another typical Kashinath movie with all the masala ingredients and a few doses of social messages".
