= Aadithya =

- Theatrical release poster
- Directed by: K. N. Lokachandran
- Written by: K. N. Lokachandran
- Produced by: M. P. Ravi; Vinay Kumar
- Starring: Shiva Rajkumar; Neelam; Rubainaa; Archana
- Cinematography: Vijay Gopal
- Edited by: S. Manohar
- Music by: Rajesh Ramanath
- Production company: Creative Media Productions
- Release date: 18 October 1996
- Running time: 139 minutes
- Country: India
- Language: Kannada

Aadithya is a 1996 Indian Kannada-language action drama film written and directed by K. N. Lokachandran. The film stars Shiva Rajkumar, Neelam, Rubainaa and Madhu Bangarappa.

The film's score and the soundtrack were scored by Rajesh Ramanath and the cinematography was by Vijay Gopal.

== Cast ==
- Shiva Rajkumar as Barrister Aadithya
- Rubainaa as Manjula
- Neelam as Neelam (guest appearance)
- Madhu Bangarappa as D.C
- Archana as Sharada
- Umashree as Pankaja
- Tara as Inspector Anu
- Bharath
- Doddanna as Criminal Lawyer Yeluru Venkata Ramana
- Satyajith as Criminal Lawyer Satyajith
- Rekha Das
- S. K. Bhagavan as Aadithya's father
- Dayanand

== Soundtrack ==
The soundtrack of the film was composed by Rajesh Ramanath. Audio On: Akash Audio

Track listing
| No. | Title | Lyrics | Singer(s) | Length |
|---|---|---|---|---|
| 1. | "Yavva Yavva" | V. Manohar | Suresh Peters, K. S. Chithra |
| 2. | "Preethi Embuva" | M. N. Vyasa Rao | Rajesh Krishnan, K. S. Chithra |
| 3. | "Beauty Entha Beauty" | Shyamsundar Kulkarni | Mano, K. S. Chithra |
| 4. | "Lollypop Lollypop" | Shyamsundar Kulkarni | Mano, K. S. Chithra |
| 5. | "Dhak Dhak Heartbeat" | Shyamsundar Kulkarni | Mano, K. S. Chithra |
| 6. | "Kavyavu Hosa Kavyavu" | Shyamsundar Kulkarni | Rajkumar |
| 7. | "Rambhe Ee Vayyarada Rambhe" | Sriranga | B. Jayashree & Rajesh Krishnan |
