= Deepavali (2000 film) =

- VCD cover
- Directed by: Dinesh Babu
- Written by: Dinesh Babu
- Produced by: S. Shankar
- Starring: Vishnuvardhan; Ramesh Aravind; Bhavana; Chandini
- Cinematography: Dinesh Babu
- Edited by: Nagesh Yadav
- Music by: M. M. Keeravani
- Production company: Shri Shankari Productions
- Release date: 2000
- Running time: 145 min
- Country: India
- Language: Kannada

Deepavali is a 2000 Indian Kannada-language comedy drama film starring Vishnuvardhan, Ramesh Aravind, Bhavana and Chandini. The film is directed and written by Dinesh Babu. The film became a box-office failure.

== Cast ==
- Vishnuvardhan as Ravi alias Ravindranath
- Ramesh Aravind as Hari alias Harichander
- Bhavana as Anu
- Chandini as Nandhini
- Ragasudha
- Ramesh Bhat
- Hema Choudhary
- K. R. Vijaya
- Sanketh Kashi
- Mandeep Roy
- Tennis Krishna
- Shivaram
- Deepa Bhaskar

== Production ==
The film was originally launched under the title Mela with Mahesh Sukhadare, director of Sambrama being the director. It was launched at Kanteerava studios.

== Soundtrack ==
Deepavali

Soundtrack album by M. M. Keeravani
- Released: 2000
- Recorded: 2000
- Genre: Soundtrack
- Length: 25:28
- Label: Manoranjan Audio
- Producer: M. M. Keeravani

M. M. Keeravani chronology
Choosoddaam Randi (2000)	Deepavali (2000)	Bava Nachadu (2001)

All the songs are composed and scored by M. M. Keeravani.

Track-List
No.	Title	Lyrics	Singer(s)	Length
1.	"Nooraru Banna Seri"	K. Kalyan	Rajesh Krishnan, Nanditha	1:23
2.	"Mukkoti Suryaniva"	K. Kalyan	S. P. Balasubrahmanyam, K. S. Chithra	4:35
3.	"Harusha Devige"	M. N. Vyasa Rao	S. P. Balasubrahmanyam	4:56
4.	"Shruti Layada Jothe"	Rudresh Nagasandra	S. P. Balasubrahmanyam	4:33
5.	"Chaitra Moodida"	Rudramurthy Shastry	Nanditha	4:57
6.	"Bhanu Varusha"	M. N. Vyasa Rao	M. M. Keeravani, Ganga Sitharasu	5:04
Total length:				25:28

== Reception ==
A critic from indiainfo.com wrote that "The film is certainly worth a dekho (watch) for those on the look out for clean entertainment". go4i wrote "It's a neat and clean film without any vulgarity, senseless action and violence. The film has comedy too. [..] The first and the second half of the film are balanced, a rare quality these days."
