= Ragasudha =

Indian actress

- Born: Raagasudha; Chennai, Tamil Nadu
- Other name: Ragasudha Ranjith
- Occupations: Actress, Model
- Years active: 1990–2007
- Spouse: Ranjith (m. 2014; div. 2015)
- Relatives: K. R. Savithri (mother); K. R. Vijaya (aunt); Anusha (sister); K. R. Vatsala (aunt)

Ragasudha or Raagasudha is an Indian actress who predominantly works in Tamil and Kannada film industries, she has also been cast in a few Malayalam and Telugu movies.

== Personal life ==
Ragasudha is the daughter of Malayalam actress K. R. Savithri and sister of actress Anusha. Actresses K. R. Vijaya and K. R. Vatsala are her aunts. She lives in Chennai with her family. Ragasudha married actor Ranjith in 2014 at Thiruvenkadu Temple, Sirkazhi. However, they got divorced in 2015. He was already married to actress Priya Raman when he left her for Ragasudha.

== Film career ==
Ragasudha made her debut in the Tamil movie Thangathin Thangam which was released in 1990.

== Filmography ==
Year	Title	Role	Language	Notes
1990	Thangathin Thangam	Latha / Muthaayi	Tamil	Debut Film
1991	Arangu	Neelima	Malayalam	
1991	Bhoomika	Raji	Malayalam	
1992	Government Mappillai	Chellayi	Tamil	
1992	Tellavaarithechalu		Telugu	
1994	Jallikattu Kaalai		Tamil	
1994	Sundara Vadana Subbalakshmi Moguda		Telugu	
1995	Thamizhachi		Tamil	
1996	Sivasakthi	Vandana	Tamil	
1996	City Dada		Tamil	
1997	Abhimanyu	Deraviyam's wife	Tamil	
1997	Nerrukku Ner	Maya	Tamil	
1997	Dhinamum Ennai Gavani	Geetha	Tamil	
1999	Chinna Durai		Tamil	
1999	Kadhalar Dhinam	Roja's friend	Tamil	
1999	Rojavanam		Tamil	
1999	Rajasthan		Tamil	
2000	Krishnarjuna		Kannada	
2000	Astra		Kannada	
2000	Deepavali		Kannada	
2001	Angala Parameswari		Tamil	
2001	Amma Nagamma		Kannada	
2001	Grama Devathe		Kannada	
2001	Mafia		Kannada	
2001	Gandhada Gombe		Kannada	
2001	Mysore Huli		Kannada	
2001	Sravu	Devu	Malayalam	
2002	Kamarasu		Tamil	
2002	Kadhal Virus		Tamil	
2002	Dharma Devathe		Kannada	
2002	Jagathy Jagadeesh in Town	Rekha	Malayalam	
2003	Vijaya Dashami		Kannada	
2003	Vasanthamalika	Anna	Malayalam	
2004	Thaaye Bhuvaneshwari	Mohini	Tamil	
2004	Peddamma Talli	Mohini	Telugu	
2005	Iyer IPS	Parameshwari	Tamil	
2006	Thambi		Tamil	
2007	Ammuvagiya Naan	Malli	Tamil	

== TV Series ==
- Ketti Melam as Eshwari (Jaya TV) - Tamil
- Dracula (Asianet) - Malayalam
