= Archana (Kannada actress) =

Indian actress

- Born: Karnataka, India
- Other name: Reena
- Occupation: Actress
- Years active: 1996–present

Archana is an Indian actress who has worked in Kannada, Telugu, Tamil and Hindi films. She is known for her performances in such movies including Ee Hrudaya Ninagagi (1996), A (1998), Phool Aur Aag (1999) and Yajamana (2000).

== Career ==
Archana was born into a Marathi speaking family. She made her debut in the 1996 Kannada movie Aadithya opposite Shiva Rajkumar. She went on to appear in many movies including Phool Aur Aag in 1999 in which she was paired with Mithun Chakraborty. In her career as an actress, Archana has acted in more than 40 films.

== Selected filmography ==
Movies of Archana include:

Year	Film	Role	Notes
1996	Aadithya	Sharada	
1997	Ee Hrudaya Ninagagi		
1998	Megha Bantu Megha		
1998	Mari Kannu Hori Myage	Soundarya	
1998	A		
1999	Phool Aur Aag	Jayanti	Hindi film
2000	Yajamana		
2000	Mava Mava Maduve Mado		
2000	Poli Bhava		
2001	Chandu		Telugu film
2001	Neelambari		
2002	Kanulu Moosina Neevaye		Telugu film
2002	Yarige Beda Duddu		
2007	Thamashegagi		
2016	CBI Sathya		
