= Chinna Mani =

- Poster
- Directed by: M. Thilakarajan
- Written by: M. Thilakarajan
- Produced by: K. S. Srinivasan; K. S. Sivaraman
- Starring: Napoleon; Kasthuri
- Cinematography: Shiva
- Edited by: A. R. Pandiyan
- Music by: Deva
- Production company: Shivashree Pictures
- Release date: 3 March 1995
- Running time: 135 minutes
- Country: India
- Language: Tamil

Chinna Mani is a 1995 Indian Tamil-language drama film directed by M. Thilakarajan in his debut. The film stars Napoleon and Kasthuri with R. P. Viswam, Srividya, Anuradha, S. S. Chandran, Vadivelu and Anusha in supporting roles. It was released on 3 March 1995, and was a box office failure.

== Plot ==
Duraisamy Thevar is a kind-hearted village chief while his father Pulikesi Thevar is the nearby wicked village chief. Duraisamy hates his father since he betrayed his mother and married another woman. Chinna Mani is a poor maid who is rejected by the villagers. Being a widow at a young age, the villagers think that she brings bad luck. Soon, Pulikesi Thevar's first wife falls sick and compels her son to marry as soon as possible. In a hurry, Duraisamy Thevar marries Chinna Mani to soothe his sick mother. The entire village is left in shock. Later, Duraisamy tells Chinna Mani the reason why he didn't get married for so many years. In the past, Duraisamy was in love with a Christian woman Princy. Her brothers were opposed to their love. In her frustration over not being able to marry Duraisamy, she immolated herself. Duraisamy accepts to live with Chinna Mani but doesn't want to touch her. What transpires later forms the crux of the story.

== Cast ==
- Napoleon as Duraisamy Thevar
- Kasthuri as Chinna Mani
- R. P. Viswam as Pulikesi Thevar
- Srividya as Pulikesi Thevar's first wife
- Anuradha as Pulikesi Thevar's second wife
- S. S. Chandran
- Vadivelu as Pechimuthu
- Anusha as Princy
- Raghavi as Parvathy
- Vizhuthugal Latha as Kaveri
- Vimalraj
- K. Kannan
- Pasi Narayanan as Narayanan
- Meesai Murugesan
- Bayilvan Ranganathan
- Swamikannu as Manikkam
- Vellai Subbaiah
- Halwa Vasu
- Joker Thulasi as Saavu Kodangi
- Kadayam Raju
- Sathish
- Singamuthu
- Roopa
- Sangeetha
- Vijay Babu in a guest appearance
- Balaji Sakthivel as doctor (uncredited)

== Soundtrack ==
The music was composed by Deva, with lyrics written by Muthulingam, Kalidasan, Kadhal Mathi, S. Malar Maran and R. V. Udayakumar.

Song	Singer(s)	Length
'Chithirai Maasathu'	Deva, Ranga Babu	4:57
'Eesawari Unaiye'	K. S. Chithra	4:42
'Kiliye Kiliye'	Deva, K. S. Chithra	4:53
'Saarayam Venenga Saamy'	Bhuvana	4:01
'Vanthathu'	Krishnaraj, K. S. Chithra	5:02

== Reception ==
R. P. R. of Kalki praised the debutant director for elegant screenplay, crisp dialogues and neatly done twists while also praising Deva for his unique background score.
