= Chandini S. Sasha =

Indian actress

- Other names: Chandini, Chandni Sharon
- Occupation: Actress
- Years active: 1998–present
- Notable work: A (1998); A. K. 47 (1999)

Chandini S. Sasha is an Indian actress who is known for her roles in Kannada-language films such as A (1998) and A. K. 47 (1999).

== Early life and career ==
Chandini was born in Africa, where she was raised. She also studied briefly in Mysore. She was living in New York and had competed in a beauty pageant, which won her the title of Miss Photogenic. One of Upendra's managers saw her photos and Upendra insisted on casting her for A (1998) despite the producers' inhibition to pay for her travel costs. She went on to star in the Kannada films A. K. 47 (1999) and Deepavali (2000). She briefly took a break from acting and pursued a master's degree and PhD in food and agriculture.

She forayed into Bhojpuri cinema through the film Ganga Jaisan Mai Hamar (2004) opposite Ravi Kishan, which turned out to be a success. She then forayed into Gujarati cinema through Maru Ghar Kya Chhe (2001) co-starring Rita Bhaduri, which was produced by Hindi film company Venus Worldwide Entertainment and featured her play a 16-year-old that ages into a 60-year-old.

Apart from acting, she worked as a RAPA (Radio & TV Professionals Association - Trust) committee member and a programme director at Manipal University. She also worked as distributor for Sony Pictures, which released Pan Nalin's Samsara (2001) in India six years after its release and as a film consultant.

She returned to acting through the Kannada film Khaidi (2015). She was a part of the crew for Barroz 3D (2024).

== Filmography ==
Year	Film	Role	Language	Notes
1998	A	Chandini	Kannada	credited as Chandini
1999	Rajasthan	Hariharan's sister	Tamil	credited as Chandini
1999	A. K. 47	Thulasi	Kannada; Telugu	credited as Chandini
2000	Deepavali	Nandhini	Kannada	credited as Chandini
2001	Maru Ghar Kya Chhe		Gujarati	credited as Chandini
2002	Love U		Kannada	credited as Chandini
2004	Ganga Jaisan Mai Hamar		Bhojpuri	credited as Chandini
2015	Khaidi		Kannada	
