= Malli (2013 TV series) =

- மல்லி
- Genre: Soap opera Kids drama
- Directed by: A. R. Ramesh
- Starring: Sandra; Sethu Darwin; Baby Harini
- Country of origin: India
- Original language: Tamil
- No. of seasons: 1
- No. of episodes: 260

Production
- Producer: Rame
- Camera setup: Multi-camera
- Running time: approx. 20-22 minutes per episode

Original release
- Network: Puthuyugam TV
- Release: 23 November 2013 – 1 September 2014

Malli (Tamil: மல்லி) is an Indian Tamil-language soap opera that aired on Puthuyugam TV from 23 November 2013 to 1 September 2014 on Monday through Friday at 6:30PM IST for 260 episodes. The show stars Sandra, Sonia Agarwal, Sethu Darwin, Baby Harini, Murali, Susithira and directed by A. R. Ramesh. This serial also re-telecast on same Channel It airs Monday through Friday at 08:30pm (2015).

== Plot ==
The story revolves around two characters, Shivani and Bala. Shivani born in a rich family who gets neglected from the parental love since their parents run after money and profession. But she manages to get brotherly love from Bala who hails from a middle-class family. Bala imagines Shivani as his older sister Malli who's dead. Getting the affection needed, Shivani too think herself as Malli at times.

== Cast ==
- Sonia Agarwal / Sandra
- Deepthi Sri
- Sethu Darwin
- Baby Harini
- Theni Murugan
- Murali
- Susithira
- Lingges Nadarajan

== International broadcast ==
- In Singapore Tamil Channel on V Thamizh HD. It aired Monday through Friday at 8:30PM.
- In Malaysia Tamil Channel on Astro Vaanavil. It airs Monday through Friday at 11:00Am & 4:30PM.
- It airs in United States, Europe and Australia on Athavan TV on Monday through Friday at 7:30PM.
