= Preetisle Beku =

- VCD cover
- Directed by: Yogesh Hunsur
- Written by: T Ramesh Rao (dialogue)
- Screenplay by: Pallavi Prakash
- Story by: Pallavi Prakash
- Produced by: C Basavanna; Soubhagya Ramesh; Suresh Jain; Prakash S Nayak
- Starring: Vijay Raghavendra; Chaya Singh
- Cinematography: V K Kannan
- Edited by: T Shashikumar
- Music by: Chaitanya
- Production company: Shree Ambika Arts
- Release date: 2 May 2003
- Country: India
- Language: Kannada

Preetisle Beku (transl. Forced to love) is a 2003 Indian Kannada-language romantic drama film directed by Yogesh Hunsur and starring Vijay Raghavendra and Chaya Singh. The film is a remake of the Hindi film Pyaar To Hona Hi Tha (1998), which itself is based on the English film French Kiss (1995).

== Plot ==
A village girl, Viji, is engaged with another man Harish, who is not at all interested in the marriage. Viji travels to Bangalore in search of Harish and is helped by another man Ganesha. She later finds out that Harish is a tapori and falls for Ganesha.

== Cast ==
- Vijay Raghavendra as Ganesha
- Chaya Singh as Vijayalakshmi "Viji"
- Avinash as Inspector Amarasimha
- K. S. Ashwath as Aish's father
- Ramesh Bhat as Ganesha's father
- Komal Kumar
- Anand as Harish's friend
- Bullet Prakash as Constable
- Chitra Shenoy as Vishalu, Ganesha's mother
- Mynavathi as Ganesha's grandmother
- Vikranth Patil as Harish
- Rashmi as Aish

== Production ==
The film was launched on 23 June 2002 at the Manjunatha Temple in Bangalore. The film is directed by Ninagoskara (2002)-fame Yogesh Hunsur, who also provided the screenplay. He previously directed Police Power (1995) and Lakshmi Mahalakshmi (1997). This is the fourth film that Vijay Raghavendra signed as a lead actor. Chaya Singh was signed for the female lead. The film bears a similar storyline to O Mallige (1997) since the producer of that film, Pallavi Prakash, worked for this film as the storywriter. The film is produced by S. A. Govindaraj and was completed in a single schedule. Chaitanya composed the music. The other actors were not cast as of mid-June 2002 prior to the film's launch, and they were decided after the film's launch.

== Music ==
Preetisle Beku

Soundtrack album by Chaitanya
- Released: 2002
- Genre: Feature film soundtrack
- Length: 30:29
- Language: Kannada
- Label: Jhankar Music

Chaitanya chronology
Ay Naan Bheeshma Kano (2003)	Preetisle Beku (2002)	Preethi Nee Illade Naa Hegirali (2004)
External audio
- Preetisle Beku – Jukebox on YouTube

The film has songs composed by Chaitanya.

Track listing
No.	Title	Lyrics	Singer(s)	Length
1.	"Preetisle Beku"	K. Kalyan	Shankar Mahadevan	4:58
2.	"Dhamani Dhamaniyali Prema"	Pallavi Prakash	Udit Narayan, Archana	5:14
3.	"Pori Bandlu Pori"	V. Nagendra Prasad	Hemanth, Ragini	4:40
4.	"Cheluve Nanage Neenu"	Ramesh Rao	Sonu Nigam, Nanditha	4:26
5.	"Gajavadana Kodugamana"	V. Nagendra Prasad	Chaithanya, Hemanth, Shamitha	5:41
6.	"Goru Goru Gorunkana"	K. Kalyan	Chaithanya, Shamitha	5:29
Total length:				30:29

== Box office ==
The film was a box office failure similar to Vijay Raghavendra's other releases that year except for Khushi.

== Home media ==
The film is available for streaming on Sun NXT.
