= Game (2002 film) =

- Directed by: John Amritraj
- Produced by: S. Soundara Pandi
- Starring: Karthik; Vinod Kumar Alva; Manoj K. Jayan; Radha
- Cinematography: T. Damodaran
- Edited by: Krishna
- Music by: S. P. Venkatesh
- Production company: Srimasani Amman Pictures
- Release date: 4 November 2002
- Country: India
- Language: Tamil

Game is a 2002 Indian Tamil-language action drama film directed by John Amritraj. The film stars Karthik and Vinod Kumar Alva. The film, produced by Srimasani Amman Pictures, had a musical scores by S. P. Venkatesh and was released after several delays on 4 November 2002 to negative reviews.

== Cast ==
- Karthik as Raja
- Vinod Kumar Alva as Joseph IPS
- Manoj K. Jayan as Lenin
- Radha as Jaya
- Urvashi as Janaki
- Rajashree as Malar
- John Amritraj as GK
- R. Sundarrajan
- Major Sundarrajan as S. Ramakrishnan I.P.S
- Pandu
- Vichu Vishwanath
- Kazan Khan
- Vijay Krishnaraj as Muthu Krishnan
- Rani
- Divya Dutta
- Manikraj
- Kullamani
- Vincent Roy
- Thideer Kannaiah
- Mahanadi Shankar
- Manager Cheena

== Production ==
John Amritraj had originally planned the film with Karthik in the late 1990s as Koottali which also had Divya Dutta in the cast, though delays meant that the film's budget and cast were subsequently affected. For the film, Karthik participated in a song sequence shot with 100 car lights, sung by Anuradha Sreeram and performed by Rani. The film went through production slowly and changed its name to Game, having a delayed release in 2002.

== Soundtrack ==
Soundtrack was composed by S. P. Venkatesh.

- "Jimba" - Mano, Swarnalatha
- "Dhak Dhak" - Anuradha Sriram
- "Achacho" - Swarnalatha
- "Dosthu" - Suresh Peters, Krishna Sundar
- "Kuchipudi" - Mano, Sujatha
- "Pesi Pesi" - Anuradha Sriram, Adithyan

== Release ==
The film was released on 4 November 2002 on Diwali day.
