= Pavithra (TV series) =

- Genre: Family; Melodrama
- Written by: Tamil Thasan; Pandiyan Guevara (dialogues)
- Screenplay by: Tamil Thasan
- Directed by: N. Priyan
- Starring: Geetha; Snehan; Anitha Sampath; Radha
- Composer: Jaikishan
- Country of origin: India
- Original language: Tamil
- No. of seasons: 1
- No. of episodes: 232

Production
- Cinematography: K. Arun Pirasath; S. Rajeeva Alvin
- Editor: MD Pirabakaran
- Camera setup: Multi-camera
- Running time: 22-25 mins per epi
- Production companies: Virtuous Loop Entertainment and Media

Original release
- Network: Kalaignar TV
- Release: 4 November 2024 – 2 August 2025

Pavithra was a 2024 Indian Tamil-language television series which aired from 4 November 2024 to 2 August 2025 on Kalaignar TV streams on Kalaignar TV YouTube channel. It stars Geetha, Snehan, Anitha Sampath and Radha in lead roles. It is directed by N. Priyan and produced by Virtuous Loop Entertainment and Media.

== Cast ==
=== Main cast ===
- Diya as Pavithra (2025)
  - Srimadhu as Pavithra
- Geetha as Ramadevi (Pavithra, Arjun, DD, Nandu and Archana's grandmother, Bhavani, Krishna and Jyothi's mother)
- Naveen as Arjun (2025)
  - Thejas as Arjun

=== Supporting ===
- Radha (2024-2025) / Roja Sholapur (2025) as Gayathri (Ramadevi's co-sister)
- Ashwin as Venu (dead) (Saridha's younger brother, Arjun and Archana's maternal uncle, Pavithra's adoptive father, Bhavani's ex-fiance)
- Vijay Anantha as Krishana (Arjun and Archana's father, Pavithra, DD and Nandu's maternal uncle, Ramadevi's son, Bhavani and Jyothi's elder brother)
- Ameen Fakkir as Murali (DD and Nandu's father)
- Raziya as Jyothi (DD and Nandu's mother, Ramadevi's younger daughter, Bhavani and Krishna's younger sister)
- Winmeen Meenakshi as Saridha Krishna (Arjun and Archana's mother, Venu's elder sister)
- -- as Manju
- Ranjana Sudharsan as Archana (Arjun's sister, Krishna and Saridha's daughter, Pavithra's cousin)
  - Jaseena as Archana
- Shivanya as DD (Jyothi and Murali's daughter, Pavithra's cousin)
  - SG Aishwarya as DD
- Pugazhh as Nandu (Jyothi and Murali's son, Pavithra's cousin)
  - Prasanna as Nandu
- Roshan Sankar as Mano (Pavithra and Arjun's friend)
  - Sai Sanjan as Mano

=== Cameo Appearances ===
- Snehan as Bharathi (Episode 1-4) (Pavithra's biological father, Bhavani's husband)
- Anitha Sampath as Bhavani (Episode 1-3) (Pavithra's biological mother, Bharathi's wife, Ramadevi's elder daughter, Krishna's younger sister, Jyothi's elder sister, Venu's ex-fiancee)
- Sirkazhi G. Sivachidambaram (Episode 5)

== Production ==
=== Casting ===
lyricist and actor Snehan was Special appearances cast as Bharathi. This series the mark comeback Snehan after two years hiatus on Television, marking his return after Bigg Boss Ultimate season 1. Bigg Boss season 4 fame Anitha Sampath was cast as Bhavani. she plays the female lead alongside Snehan. This making Snehan and Anitha Sampath first lead role in Tamil television.

Veteran actress Geetha was cast as Ramadevi, marking her return to Tamil Television series after Rajakumari. Actress Radha play the negative role as Gayathri.

In end of February 2025, introduced a 20-year leapwas introduced with which several new grown-up characters entered in the show and became main characters. Diya and Naveen were introduced as leads who play Pavithra and Arjun.
