= Thangathin Thangam =

- Title card
- Directed by: Siraj
- Screenplay by: Siraj
- Story by: Radha Bharathi
- Produced by: K. Prabhakaran
- Starring: Ramarajan; Ragasudha
- Cinematography: B. S. Lokanath
- Edited by: L. Kesavan
- Music by: S. A. Rajkumar
- Production company: Anbalaya Films
- Release date: 14 April 1990
- Country: India
- Language: Tamil

Thangathin Thangam is a 1990 Indian Tamil-language action drama film directed by Siraj, starring Ramarajan and Ragasudha. It was released on 14 April 1990.

== Plot ==
A young village leader falls in love with a girl assuming that she is a villager. However, things become tricky when he learns that she is from a wealthy family and a friend of his enemy.

== Cast ==
- Ramarajan
- Ragasudha
- Jayabharathi
- Goundamani
- Vinu Chakravarthy
- Senthil
- Anandaraj
- S. A. Rajkumar in a cameo appearance
- Madhuri
- Mohana Priya

== Soundtrack ==
The music was composed by S. A. Rajkumar.

Song	Singers	Lyrics	Length
"Muthu Muthu"	Asha Bhosle	S. A. Rajkumar	4:35
"Sevandhipoo Maalakattu"	S. P. Balasubrahmanyam, K. S. Chithra	S. A. Rajkumar	4:14
"Thangathoda Thangam"	Mano	Vaali	4:46
"Ore Kelayil"	Yesudas	Vaali	4:02
"Sevandhipoo Maalakattu"	Asha Bhosle	S. A. Rajkumar	4:51
"Veera Chalambukaaran"	Mano, S. A. Rajkumar	Vaali	4:08

== Reception ==
C. R. K. of Kalki called it another film which faithfully mimics M. G. Ramachandran's style of films.
