= Rendu Pondatti Kaavalkaaran =

- Poster
- Directed by: Relangi Narasimha Rao
- Written by: Relangi Narasimha Rao; B. Shankar (dialogues)
- Produced by: P. Balaraman
- Starring: Anand Babu; Rohini; Vaidehi; Devipriya
- Cinematography: Sarath
- Edited by: Murali-Ramaiah
- Music by: Raj–Koti
- Production company: Sree Productions
- Release date: 7 February 1992
- Running time: 130 minutes
- Country: India
- Language: Tamil

Rendu Pondatti Kaavalkaaran (transl. The policeman with two wives) is a 1992 Indian Tamil-language comedy film directed by Relangi Narasimha Rao. The film stars Anand Babu in a dual role, Rohini, Vaidehi and Devipriya. It is a remake of the director's own Telugu film Iddaru Pellala Muddula Police. The film was released on 7 February 1992.

== Plot ==
Krishnan is an honest police constable who has two wives Rukmini and Satyabhama. However, his two wives hate each other. Krishnan is transferred to another city because of his honesty and the fact that he often refuses to do his superiors drudgery.

In the past, Krishnan married Rukmini who thought that he was a Sub-inspector of police. When she realised what his real job was, she left him. In the meantime, Krishnan and his neighbour Satyabhama fell in love and had sexual intercourse. Then Satyabhama begged Rukmini to help her and Satyabhama married Krishnan.

Fed up with the transfers, Krishnan throws away his police uniform and becomes a pickpocket. Anand, Krishnan's look-alike, takes his identity and becomes a police constable. Soon, Anand must juggle between Krishnan's two wives while Krishnan must manage Anand's girlfriend Lalitha.

== Cast ==
- Anand Babu as Krishnan and Anand
- Rohini as Rukmini
- Vaidehi as Satyabhama
- Devipriya as Lalitha
- Janagaraj as Muthusamy
- Senthil
- Y. Vijaya as Mangalam
- Sri Lakshmi
- Loose Mohan
- Omakuchi Narasimhan
- Typist Gopu

== Soundtrack ==
The soundtrack was composed by Raj–Koti, with lyrics written by Vairamuthu.

Song	Singer(s)	Duration
"Ennikko"	S. P. Balasubrahmanyam, Minmini	4:40
"Kanna Kanna"	S. P. Balasubrahmanyam, Minmini	4:45
"Police Police Police Mama"	S. P. Balasubrahmanyam, Minmini, K. S. Chithra	4:55
"Sundakkai Kuzhambu"	K. S. Chithra, Minmini	4:50

== Reception ==
Sundarji of Kalki wrote that viewers could enjoy the film if they forget logic.
