= A. R. Ramesh =

Indian film director

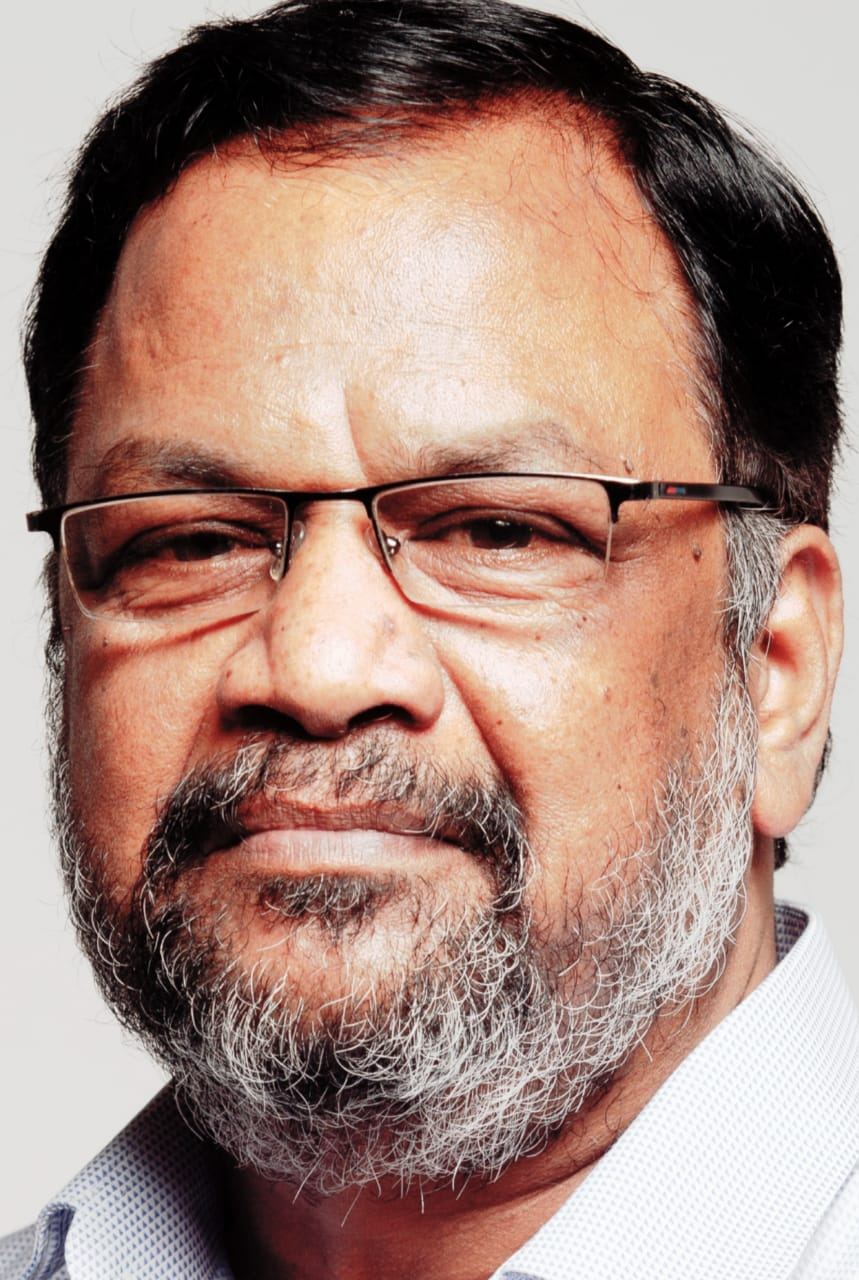
- Born: 7 June 1960 (age 66); Kumbakonam, Tamil Nadu
- Other name: Director Ramesh
- Education: B.Com
- Occupation: Director
- Years active: 1990 - Present
- Relatives: R. Aravindraj (Brother)

A. R. Ramesh is an Indian film director who has worked on Tamil language films and television serials. He was active in feature films in the late 1990s, making action and romantic films.

== Career ==
Ramesh made his directorial debut with Thayagam (1996) featuring Vijayakanth, and the success of the film saw him sign on for three ventures in a short span of time. He then made the romantic films, Dhinamum Ennai Gavani (1997) and Ini Ellam Sugame (1998), neither of which fared well at the box office. Ramesh also worked on the production of the multi-starrer Suyamvaram (1999) alongside nine other directors, and was given the responsibility of directing scenes involving Parthiban and Suvalakshmi. Ramesh also then worked on a bilingual action film titled Independence Day (2000), which was shot in Tamil and Kannada over a period of two years, with Arun Pandian and Saikumar in the lead roles. In 2001, he began production on a film titled Daddy starring Raghuvaran which was never materialised.

== Filmography ==
Year	Film	Notes
1996	Thayagam	
1997	Dhinamum Ennai Gavani	
1998	Ini Ellam Sugame	
1999	Suyamvaram	
2000	Independence Day	Simultaneously shot in Kannada

Serials Directed

Name	Language	Channel
Ganga Yamuna Saraswati	Tamil	Raj TV & Sun TV
Pasam	Tamil	Sun TV
Bharathi	Tamil	Kalaignar TV
Udal Porul Ananthi	Tamil	DD Podhigai
Thalaiva	Tamil	Makkal TV
Malli	Tamil	Puthuyugam TV
Lakshmi Kalyanam	Tamil	Vijay TV
Boomi & Friends	Tamil	Chutti TV
Nagamma	Telugu	Gemini TV
Snekanjali	Telugu	Gemini TV
Amma Nagammaa	Kannada	Udaya TV

Produced & Directed

Name	Language	Channel
Nagamma	Tamil	Raj TV
Climax	Telugu	Zee TV
