= Alok Shrivastava =

Indian film director

Alok Shrivastava (born 5 March 1964 in Gwalior (MP) is an Indian media producer.

== Early life ==
He studied at Carmel Convent School (Gwalior) and Central School (Gwalior). He earned a B.com from Mumbai University from Sydenham college.

== Career ==
His first TV serial was Fassana, which was broadcast on D.D.Metro and continued for 200 episodes. His second serial was Aurat Teri Yahi Kahaani, which completed 350 episodes. Zamane ko Dikhana hai and Durga successfully completed 400 and 200 episodes, respectively. He has done several commercials.

His Hindi feature films as producer included Phool aur Aag, Guru Mahaaguru, Jane Hoga Kya and Farq. He wrote and directed The Unsound, a Hindi film. His banner, PK Arts Creations, produced Wo Kaun Thi. His Marathi feature film Miss Match, under the banner of Gold Coin Entertainment, was released on 12 December 2014.

Film	Year	Post
Miss Match	2014	Producer, Creative Director
Jane Hoga Ky	2006	Producer
The Unsound	2013	Producer, Director, Writer
Guru Mahaguru	2002	Producer
Phool aur Aag	1999	Producer
Wo Kaun Thi	2007	Producer, Director
