= Iddaru Pellala Muddula Police =

- DVD cover
- Directed by: Relangi Narasimha Rao
- Written by: Kaasi Viswanath; Diwakar Babu (dialogues)
- Screenplay by: Relangi Narasimha Rao
- Story by: Relangi Narasimha Rao; Kaasi Viswanath
- Produced by: S. Venkateswara Rao; G. Chandandas
- Starring: Rajendra Prasad; Divyavani; Poojitha; Anusha
- Cinematography: Sarath
- Edited by: D. Raja Gopal
- Music by: J. V. Raghavulu
- Production company: Suchitra Creations
- Release date: 10 May 1991
- Running time: 143 mins
- Country: India
- Language: Telugu

Iddaru Pellala Muddula Police (transl. The Doting Police Officer with Two Wives) is a 1991 Telugu-language comedy film directed by Relangi Narasimha Rao. The film stars Rajendra Prasad, Divyavani, Poojitha and Anusha. It is the debut of actress Anusha in the film industry, and was a box office hit. The film was later remade in Kannada as Ibbaru Hendira Muddina Police and in Tamil as Rendu Pondatti Kaavalkaaran, both versions were directed by Relangi himself.

== Cast ==
- Rajendra Prasad as Constable Kishtaiah & Anand (dual role)
- Divyavani as Rukmini / Rukku
- Poojitha as Satyabhama / Satya
- Anusha as Lalitha
- Suthi Velu as Gopal Rao/ Gedhela Kanthamma's husband
- Mallikarjuna Rao as Madhavaiah
- Krishna Chaitanya as Paatadasu
- Potti Prasad as Head constable Chokkalingam
- Chidatala Appa Rao as Drunker
- Sri Lakshmi as Madhavaiah's wife
- Y. Vijaya as Gedhela Kanthamma

== Soundtrack ==
Iddaru Pellala Muddula Police

Film score by J. V. Raghavulu
- Released: 1991
- Genre: Soundtrack
- Length: 23:37
- Label: Lahari Music
- Producer: J. V. Raghavulu

Music composed by J. V. Raghavulu. Music released on Lahari Music Company.

Track listing
No.	Title	Lyrics	Singer(s)	Length
1.	"Gudu Gudu Gunjam"	Jaladi	S. P. Balasubrahmanyam, Chitra, S. P. Sailaja	4:46
2.	"Gokulammidi Gopaiah"	Sahithi	S. P. Balasubrahmanyam, Chitra	5:20
3.	"Amma Naa Muvokaayo"	Sahathi	P. Susheela, S. P. Sailaja	4:52
4.	"Challa Challaga"	Jaladi	S. P. Balasubrahmanyam, Chitra	4:21
5.	"Sivudo Sivudo"	D. Narayana Varma	S. P. Balasubrahmanyam, Ramani	4:18
Total length:				23:37
