= Mridula (film) =

Mrudula
- Directed by: Antony Eastman
- Written by: Antony Eastman
- Screenplay by: Antony Eastman
- Produced by: ramji
- Starring: Raghu; Mrudula; Jagathy Sreekumar; Captain Raju
- Cinematography: CE Babu
- Edited by: G Murali
- Production company: SS Pictures
- Distributed by: SS Pictures
- Release date: 1990
- Country: India
- Language: Malayalam

Mrudula is a 1990 Indian Malayalam film, directed by Antony Eastman. The film stars Raghu, Mrudula, Jagathy Sreekumar and Captain Raju.

== Cast ==
- Raghu as Anirudh
- Mrudula as Mridula
- Jagathy Sreekumar as Porinchu
- Captain Raju as Captain Ganesh
- Prathapachandran as Menon
- K. R. Savithri as Banumathiyamma
- Latha Thomas
- Mafia Sasi as Gunda
