= A (1998 Indian film) =

- DVD cover
- Directed by: Upendra
- Written by: Upendra
- Produced by: B. Jagannath; B. G. Manjunath
- Starring: Upendra; Chandini; Archana
- Cinematography: H. C. Venugopal
- Edited by: T. Shashikumar
- Music by: Gurukiran
- Production company: Uppi Entertainers
- Distributed by: Yash Raj
- Release date: 12 February 1998
- Running time: 148 minutes
- Country: India
- Language: Kannada
- Budget: ₹1.25 crore
- Box office: ₹12—20 crore

A is a 1998 Indian Kannada-language romantic psychological thriller film written and directed by Upendra. It stars Upendra and Chandini, both making their acting debuts. The film revolves around a love story between a film director and an actress which is narrated through multiple flashbacks within flashbacks and reverse screenplay. It also explores dark truths like casting couch in the film industry. The soundtrack and background score were handled by Gurukiran in his debut film.

The opening sequence of the film where a misanthropic man who is exhilarated by the sense of power he receives by carrying a revolver while walking on the streets was reported to be based on Jean-Paul Sartre's short story Erostratus included in his 1939 collection of short stories The Wall.

A was released on 12 February 1998 and received praise for Upendra and Chandini's performances, soundtrack, cinematography, and reverse screenplay, which made the audience watch it multiple times to understand the story. The film collected more than ₹20 crores at the box office and gained a cult following. The film was dubbed into Telugu under the same title and was released in Andhra Pradesh. It was remade in Tamil as Adavadi. Upendra won the Udaya Film Award for Best Male Actor (1998) and Gurukiran won the Udaya Film Award for Best Music Director (1998).

== Plot ==
Marina, a foreigner, wants to distribute the unreleased controversial film A, written and directed by Surya. However, the CBFC permits only 20 random minutes to be screened, and the climax is censored to such an extent that it no longer makes any sense. She suggests that the producers re-shoot the film. However, Surya is unable to participate in the film's shoot as he has become a drunkard after actress Chandini, who debuted with his film, rejected his love. Surya's family is unable to make ends meet after he stops directing films. Lost in his thoughts, he wanders near her house every night drunk, only to be expelled by her henchmen.

Unable to bear Surya's torture, Chandini asks him to jump from a building to prove his love. Surya jumps without hesitation. While he survives the fall, he is badly wounded and admitted to the hospital by Marina and the team. One of Surya's former assistant directors explains Surya's past to Marina. Surya was a successful director who had no feelings, especially for a woman's love. After his current female lead fails to act properly, he casts Chandini after a chain of events. Initially, Surya rejects Chandini's love, but after frequent run-ins and days of pursuit, Surya falls in love with her madly. Surya later meets a rich and busy Chandini, who lives in a big bungalow and is now the mistress of a wealthy married businessman.

Chandini defends herself, saying that Surya's views on the materialistic world influenced her to prioritize money over everything else after her father's death. He tries to explain to her that she is wrong, but is expelled. Due to this, Surya gave up everything and became an alcoholic, wandering near her house every day, hoping that she would accept him. Surya escapes from the hospital and is confronted by Marina, to whom Surya explains his love for Chandini. He then saves a novice actress named Archana from a group of henchmen who are revealed to be working for Chandini. Archana reveals Chandini was used as bait by the politicians to trap Surya and stop his A from releasing.

In turn, Chandini exploited the weakness of those politicians through the casting couch. She proves this to Surya, who, along with his father and Archana, is arrested on charges of prostitution. The police were bribed by Chandini, who abducts Archana while Surya and his father are arrested. Surya and his father are released on bail by Marina, and his family's plight makes Surya swear revenge. He restarts the shoot of A and turns out to be a superstar due to the film's anticipated success. The climax shoot is pending, and Surya wants to shoot it realistically, which includes the death of Chandini in a burning house.

The camera rolls and Surya kidnaps Chandini from her hen house where women are prostituted to influential politicians and people in business, where she kills the businessman she was engaged to. He brings her to the location and sets it on fire after rolling the camera. She knocks him out, and he falls unconscious after hitting a rock. Archana, Marina, and the producers come to the spot to save him. Archana shows him the film footage that was shot after revealing that Chandini is a good woman who wanted to bring Surya back to normal by acting as a ruthless criminal who is destroying many actresses' lives like Archana. The footage shows a naked Chandini dying and revealing the truth.

Chandini says that the businessman was the friend of a few corrupt politicians who wanted to have sex with her. They killed her father and sexually assaulted her and her minor sister. The businessman had blackmailed Chandini with a tape that captured the brutal assault. As per their directions, she had to cheat on Surya. However, Chandini brings Surya back to normal with the help of Archana and gives A a perfect ending. Surya tries to save her by entering the house, but she dies, asking him to live long and make films that expose the demons that haunt society.

== Cast ==
- Upendra as Surya
- Chandini as Chandini
- Archana as herself
- Marina as Marina
- Kote Prabhakar as film producer
- Biradar
- Malathi
- Suchitra as Surya's sister
- Saroja Srishailan as Surya's mother
- Michael Madhu as Michael
- Mandapanda Aiyappa as Teja, a businessman
- Tumkur Mohan
- Suresh Babu
- Gurukiran as Actor
- Shankar Bhat
- Sriraj Kothari
- Balu Murugaraj
- M. V. Joshi
- Raghunath
- Roopa Iyer
- Bhushan Geechi
- Narendra Babu
- R. G. Vijayasarathy
- Damu
- Puttaraju

== Production ==
=== Development ===
Upendra along with B. G. Manjunath, B. Jagannath, and B. V. Ramakrishna — founded the film production company, Uppi Entertainers, in October 1996, with an equal partnership. After Kannada film distributors refused to purchase the distribution rights for A following the producers themselves not being confident of the film doing well, it was purchased by a newcomer, Yash Raj. Speaking about the film's title prior to a theatrical re-release in 2024, Upendra said: "The title A just came to me. It was my first film as a hero, and the content led us to choose the title. We thought the film would be certified 'A' by the censor board, which would mean that the film is for adults. But to me, A was for a mature audience. We also came up with the tagline 'Only for intelligent people'."

=== Casting ===
The film marked the acting debut of Chandini S. Sasha in Kannada cinema. Her pictures taken from an American beauty contest found their way into the hands of one of Upendra's managers. Upendra saw those photographs and insisted on casting her for the film despite the travel costs of bringing her from New York.

== Soundtrack ==
A

Soundtrack album by Gurukiran
- Released: 3 February 1998
- Genre: Feature film soundtrack
- Length: 24:01
- Label: Lahiri Music

Gurukiran chronology
A (1998)	Upendra (1999)
External audio
- A – Jukebox on YouTube

Gurukiran composed the music for the film and the soundtracks which marked his debut. The album has five soundtracks. The daughter-in-law of Kannada poet G.P. Rajarathnam alleged that a song by the late poet, "Helkollakondooru thalemyagondhsooru," for which she held the copyright, had been used by Upendra in the film without her consent.

Track listing
No.	Title	Lyrics	Singer(s)	Length
1.	"Sum Sumne"	Upendra	Rajesh Krishnan	4:54
2.	"Chandini"	Murali Mohan	L. N. Shastry, Prathima Rao	5:03
3.	"Helkollakonduru"	G. P. Rajarathnam	L. N. Shastry	5:08
4.	"Idhu One Day Match"	Murali Mohan	L. N. Shastry, Upendra	6:34
5.	"Maari Kannu"	Upendra	S. P. Balasubrahmanyam	4:22
Total length:				24:01

== Release ==
The film was given a "U" (Universal) certification from the CBFC.

=== Box-office response ===
A was made at ₹1.25 crore and collected more than ₹20 crore at the box office. The film ran for 25 weeks in Karnataka and its Telugu version ran for 100 days in Andhra Pradesh.

=== Critical reception ===
It was described by a reviewer as "loud and disjointed, like the ramblings of a delirious mind, but made a lot of sense". Its design received some praise. The dialogues provoked controversy, due to their misogynistic and philosophical nature. They also contained autobiographical elements.

=== Influences ===
In an interview given to the Times of India on 24 May 2020, Malayalam director Lijo Jose Pellissery who is famous for nonlinear storylines and aestheticization of violence picked this movie as one of the five Indian movies which have managed to influence him at different levels.

== Awards ==
- Udaya Film Award for Best Male Actor – Upendra
- Udaya Film Award for Best Music Director – Gurukiran
- Karnataka State Film Award for Best Sound Recording – Murali Rayasam
- Karnataka State Film Award for Best Editor – T. Shashikumar
