= Radha (Sundara Travels actress) =

Indian actress

- Occupation: Actress
- Years active: 2002-2008; 2012; 2023-Present

Radha is an Indian actress who has appeared in the Tamil film industry. The actress won critical acclaim for her performance in Sundara Travels (2002) and later appeared in other Tamil language films.

== Career ==
Radha made her debut in the comedy film Sundara Travels (2002). The film opened to average reviews and had a successful run at the box office, with the performances of her co-actors Murali and Vadivelu being praised. After the release of the film, Radha alleged that the film's producer S. V. Thangaraj had offered her a role in his next film if she slept with him, creating media attention. Radha then starred alongside Karthik in the long-delayed production Game (2002), before portraying small roles in the Sathyaraj-starrer Adavadi (2007) and Kathavarayan (2008), several years later. She later moved on to appear in television dramas such as Bhairavi (2012).

In November 2013, Radha lodged a complaint against entrepreneur Faizul, claiming that he had refused to marry her after a six-year live-in relationship and had threatened to make their private videos public. She further alleged that director Erode Soundar been an accessory to Faizul's wrongdoing. Within three weeks, she withdrew her complaint against Faizul.

In August 2016, Radha claimed that a gangster named Vairam from Puzhal Central Prison called and threatened her about her relationship with film producer, Munivel. She lodged a police complaint following the incident, though following her press statement, Munivel's wife came out and criticised the actress for damaging her relationship with her husband.

== Filmography ==
Films

Year	Film	Role	Notes
2002	Sundara Travels	Vasanthy	
2002	Game	Jaya	
2004	Maanasthan	Selvarasu's love interest	Cameo Appearance
2007	Adavadi	Chandini	
2008	Kathavarayan	Sarrosa	
2026	Sweety Naughty Crazy	Shylu Aunty	
2026	Moondram Kan	Ambika	

Television

- 2012 Bhairavi Aavigalukku Priyamanaval (Sun TV) - Bhairavi
- 2023 Bharathi Kannamma 2 (Vijay TV) - Sharmila
- 2024-2025 Pavithra (Kalaignar TV) - Gayathri
