= Dhinamum Ennai Gavani =

- Directed by: A. R. Ramesh
- Written by: A. R. Ramesh; E. Ramdoss (dialogues)
- Produced by: Tamil Fathima
- Starring: Ramki; Sanghavi; Prakash Raj
- Cinematography: Rajarajan
- Edited by: G. Jeyachandran
- Music by: Sirpy
- Production company: Tamilannai Cine Creation
- Release date: 14 April 1997
- Running time: 135 minutes
- Country: India
- Language: Tamil

Dhinamum Ennai Gavani (transl. Look at me, everyday) is a 1997 Indian Tamil language crime film directed by A. R. Ramesh. The film stars Ramki, Sanghavi and Prakash Raj. It was released on 14 April 1997. The film was a failure at the box office. Two years after its release, it was one of the 11 low-budget films chosen by a jury, with the producers of each film being given a ₹5 lakh subsidy by the then Tamil Nadu Chief Minister M. Karunanidhi.

== Plot ==
Rolex (Prakash Raj) is an intelligent international smuggler on the run. Later, the fearless Assistant Commissioner, Jai Kumar (Ramki), arrests him and sends him to jail. Jai Kumar and Raji (Sanghavi), who are deeply in love, get married. Rolex wants to take revenge on Jai Kumar by his way. Thereafter, he escapes from jail and fakes his death. What transpires later forms the crux of the story.

== Cast ==
- Ramki as ACP Jai Kumar IPS
- Sanghavi as Raji
- Prakash Raj as Rolex
- Vivek as Inspector Balram
- Thyagu as Ganesan
- Ragasudha as Geetha
- K. R. Vatsala
- Balu Anand
- Mohan Raman
- Jeeva as Julie
- Rajasekhar as Raji's father
- Peeli Sivam
- Raviraj as Ramdoss
- Amanullah Khan
- Laxmi Rattan
- Vijay Eswaran
- Arunagiri
- Pasupathy
- Anuradha
- Shakita
- Baby Anushya as Aishu
- Sridhar as dancer in "Pathikichiyamma Pambara Vayasu"

== Soundtrack ==
The soundtrack was composed by Sirpy.

Song	Singer(s)	Lyrics	Duration
"College En Kaiyile"	Anuradha Sriram, Chorus	Palani Bharathi	4:56
"Pathikichiyamma Pambara Vayasu"	Mano, Swarnalatha, Chorus	Arivumathi	3:50
"Sevvanthi Thottathile"	P. Unni Krishnan, K. S. Chithra	Kamakodiyan	4:25
"Va Va Bata"	Anuradha Sriram, Chorus	Palani Bharathi	4:27
