= K. R. Vatsala =

Indian actress

- Born: 12 October 1962 (age 63); Thiruvananthapuram
- Occupation: Actress
- Years active: 1992-2010
- Children: 2
- Relatives: Ragasudha (niece); K. R. Vijaya (sister); K. R. Savithri (sister); Anusha (niece)

K. R. Vatsala is an Indian actress who works in Tamil and Malayalam films as well as Tamil television.

== Career ==
Vatsala was supposed to begin her career with Kalam Vellum (1970), playing the role of Jaishankar's younger sister.

== Personal life ==
Vatsala was married but she and her husband later decided to part ways.

== Filmography ==
- Sundara Kandam (1992)
- Subash (1996) as Nithyananda Swamy's assistant
- Dharma Chakkaram (1997) as Kannukku Pillai's wife
- Arunachalam (1997)
- Kadhalukku Mariyadhai (1997)
- Dhinamum Ennai Gavani (1997)
- Putham Puthu Poove (1997)
- Kalyana Galatta (1998)
- Ponmanam (1998)
- Kondattam (1998)
- Ini Ellam Sugame (1998)
- Color Kanavugal (1998)
- Harichandra (1998)
- Thullatha Manamum Thullum (1999) as Mani's wife
- Suyamvaram (1999) as Kanna's mother
- Annan Thangachi(1999) as Bhaskar's mother
- Sundari Neeyum Sundaran Naanum (1999) as Mani Megalai
- Kaama (1999) as Rich lady
- Ooty (1999)
- Ennavalle (2000)
- Simmasanam (2000)
- Veeranadai (2000)
- Devi Durga Shakti (2001)
- Sri Raja Rajeshwari (2001)
- Maayan (2001)
- Krishna Krishna (2001)
- Dheena (2001) as Malarvannan's wife
- Lovely (2001) as Chandru's mother
- Citizen (2001) as Devasakayam's wife
- Jollyman (2001)
- Padai Veetu Amman (2002)
- Junior Senior (2002)
- Red (2002) as School Principal
- Pathikichi (2003)
- Military (2003)
- Thendral (2004)
- Vayasu Pasanga (2004) as Seethalakshmi
- Ippadikku Kadhaludan Seenu (2004)
- London (2005)
- 47A Besant Nagar Varai (2006)
- Adavadi (2007) as Chandini's mother
- Vasool (2008) as Jinda's mother
- Netru Pol Indru Illai (2009) as Rahul's mother
- Puthumugam (2010) as Srija
- Suvadugal (2013)

=== Malayalam ===
- Ottayaal Pattaalam (1992) as Cabaret dancer
- Kallanum Policum (1992) as Housewife
- Kudumbasametham (1992) as Housewife
- Maarathon (Aayaraam Gayaaraam) (1992)
- Midhunam (1993) as Renuka
- Ithu Manjukalam (1993) as Elizabeth
- Thenmavin Kombath (1994) as Karthumbi's sister
- Boxer (1995) as Comedy
- Aksharam (1995) as Subhadra
- Sakshyam (1995) as Nambiar's aunt
- Kalamasseriyil Kalyanayogam (1995) as Ambika
- Kusruthikaatu (1995) as Home maker
- Mangalam Veettil Manaseswari Gupta (1995) as Housewife
- Achan Rajavu Appan Jethavu (1995)
- Kaattile Thadi Thevarude Ana (1995)
- Puthukkottayile Puthumanavaalan (1995)
- Aramana Veedum Anjoorekkarum (1995)
- Thumbolikadappuram (1995)
- The King (1995)
- K.L. 7/95 Ernakulam North (1995) as Sherly
- Aayiram Naavulla Ananthan (1996) as Nurse
- Sathyabhamakkoru Premalekhanam (1996)as Chandrasekara Varma's Wife
- Kinnam Katta Kallan (1996)
- Oru Mutham Mani Mutham (1997) as Savithri
- Vamsham (1997) as Sharadha Mathew
- Oru Yathramozhi (1997)
- Ancharakalyanam (1997)
- Shibiram (1997)
- Chenchaayam (2001)
- Desam (2002)
- Maniyarakallan (2005) as Kasthuri's mother
- Narakasuran (2006) as Vimala Bhojarajan

=== Other languages ===
- Sarppayaagam (1992; Telugu)
- Saat Rang Ke Sapne (1998; Hindi) as Jalima's sister

== Television ==
- Kadhal Pagadai as Akhalya 1996 -1998
- Premi 1997
- Soolam 2001-2002
- Manaivi 2004-2005
- Raja Rajeswari 2004-2005
- Arasi as Ganga's mother 2007, 2009
- Thirumathi Selvam as Bhagyam 2007–2008
- Thendral as Thilaga, Velayudham's sister 2009–2010
- Gokulathil Seethai 2009-2010
- Vanthaana Thanthaana
- Selvi
- Kaathirukka Oruthi
- Oviyam
- Manaivi
- Puthumugam
- Manithargal
