= Phool Aur Aag =

- Poster
- Directed by: T L V Prasad
- Written by: T. L. V. Prasad; Anirudh Tiwari (dialogues)
- Story by: Marumalarchi Bharathi
- Produced by: Alok Shrivastava
- Starring: Mithun Chakraborty; Jackie Shroff; Harish; Ayesha Jhulka; Archana; Aruna Irani; Rakesh Bedi; Kishore Bhanushali
- Cinematography: K. V. Ramanna
- Edited by: N. Maheswara Rao; Arun; Sekhar
- Music by: Aditya Sunny; Shaheen
- Release date: 14 May 1999
- Running time: 125 min.
- Language: Hindi

Phool Aur Aag (transl. Flower and Fire) is a 1999 Indian Hindi-language action film directed by T L V Prasad, starring Mithun Chakraborty, Jackie Shroff, Harish, Ayesha Jhulka, Archana, Aruna Irani and Rakesh Bedi. The film was a remake of Tamil film Maru Malarchi. The film was a commercial success at the box office.

== Plot ==
The Zamindar Deva does everything possible for its residents. He allocates considerable sums for the construction of schools, hospitals, and temples. The result of all the benefits of Deva becomes immeasurable respect from fellow countrymen. But one day, saving a girl from a snake bite, Deva attracts the wrath of people. This creates serious misunderstanding between two villages which results blood bath.

== Cast ==
- Mithun Chakraborty as Zamindar Deva
- Jackie Shroff as Jaswant
- Harish Kumar as special appearance in "Main Gaaon Dil Gaaye"
- Dalip Tahil as Suraj
- Mohan Joshi as Rattan Choudhury
- Kishore Bhanushali
- Adi Irani as Mamaji
- Archana as Jayanti
- Aruna Irani as Deva's mother
- Avtar Gill as Match-Maker
- Sonia Sahni as Wife of Rattan Choudhary
- Shiva Rindani as Shiva
- Rakesh Bedi as Gopi
- Pramod Moutho as Killer
- Disha Vakani
- Ayesha Jhulka as item number "Main Gaaon Dil Gaaye"

== Songs ==
1. "Aankho Me Rehne Lage Hai Nasha" - Jaspinder Narula
2. "In Hawao Ke Daman Pe Hai" - Jaspinder Narula, Sukhwinder Singh
3. "Mai Gau Dil Gaya" - Achal, Kavita Krishnamurthy
4. "Piya Piya Bole Jiya" - Kavita Krishnamurthy, Vinod Rathod
5. "Saasein Mahek Rahi Hai" - Kavita Krishnamurthy
6. "Suraj Ke Jaisa Hai" - Achal
