= Iyer IPS =

- DVD cover
- Directed by: Harirajan
- Written by: Harirajan
- Produced by: Harirajan
- Starring: Sathyaraj; Megha; Sanghavi
- Cinematography: B. Kannan
- Edited by: M. Sunil Kumar, Kishore Te
- Music by: Dhina
- Production company: Priyanka Art Productions
- Release date: 21 January 2005
- Running time: 142 minutes
- Country: India
- Language: Tamil

Iyer IPS is a 2005 Indian Tamil-language action film written, produced and directed by P. Harirajan. It stars Sathyaraj in dual roles as a police officer (hero) and a gangster (villain), along with Megha and Sanghavi. The music was composed by Dhina. The film was released on 21 January 2005.

== Plot ==
DCP Gopal Iyer is an encounter specialist. He comes across a Muslim woman named Nasreen, whose father is killed by gangsters. Out of pity, he marries her much against his parents' opposition. Suddenly, Nasreen passes away in a childbirth. Meanwhile, Jenniffer, a scribe, learns of a fake encounter organized by Iyer to bump off a known rowdy. She follows him from then, blackmailing him, but Iyer, who thinks that evil forces do not deserve a chance in the court, does not change his style of operations. Elsewhere, a mute gangster named Venkatachalapathy, whose men killed Nasreen's father, vows to kill Iyer after he got imprisoned after apprehended by Iyer. Now aware that his son kills people in the name of encounters, Iyer's father Vishwanatha Iyer decides to take cudgels against him. He falls in to the vicious trap of Venkatachalapathy, and the rest is about how Iyer embarks on a mission to rescue his family and put an end to Venkatachalapathy's shenanigans.

== Cast ==
- Sathyaraj in a dual role as:
  - DCP Gopal Iyer IPS (Protagonist)
  - Venkatachalapathy (Antagonist)
- Megha as Jennifer
- Sanghavi as Nasreen
- Anandaraj as Pasupathy
- OAK Sundar as Gajapathy
- Narayana Rao as Vishwanatha Iyer
- Pandu as SI Maduray
- Anu Mohan as Constable Krishnamoorthy
- Mahanadhi Shankar as Rowdy Maasi
- Sampath Ram as Venkatachalapathy's henchman
- Sathyapriya as Iyer's and Parameshwari's mother
- Ragasudha as Parameshwari
- LIC Narasimhan as Magistrate

== Soundtrack ==
Soundtrack was composed by Dhina.

| Song | Singers | Lyrics |
|---|---|---|
| "Mylapore Mami" | Pushpavanam Kuppusamy, Srividya | S. R. Paralan |
| "Manmadhane Manmadhane" | Malathy | P. Harirajan |
| "Hi-Tech Kangala" | Ganga, Srilekha Parthasarathy, Srividya | Piraisoodan |

== Reception ==
Malini Mannath of Chennai Online wrote, "The weak script, inane charecterisation and the director being totally like a fish out of water in the milieu he's chosen, have all taken their toll on Satyaraj's performance too." Cinesouth wrote, "The film is taken with the sole intention making money by using the present 'salability' of Sathyaraj. In this film, Ari had written the story, screenplay and had produced this movie, without 'bothering to direct' it. He should be appreciated for this rare courage. Sathyaraj should be 'appreciated' for having acted in this half- baked movie". Malathi Rangarajan of The Hindu wrote, "HARIRAJAN, [..] should have worked more on the script, his own, to make it neat and tight. As such it sags at several places tempting the viewer to take a nap not only in between, but also in the climax. Except Satyaraj, the actors fail to raise to the expectations".
