= Sundara Travels =

- DVD cover
- Directed by: Thaha
- Written by: Govind Padman; Mahesh Mithra
- Produced by: S. V. Thangaraj
- Starring: Murali; Radha; Vadivelu
- Cinematography: Selva R.
- Edited by: P. C. Mohanan
- Music by: Bharani
- Production company: Yuvasree Creations
- Release date: 30 August 2002
- Running time: 160 minutes
- Country: India
- Language: Tamil

Sundara Travels is a 2002 Tamil-language comedy film directed by Thaha. The film stars Murali, Radha, and Vadivelu. Vasu, Sabitha Anand, and Vinu Chakravarthy appear in supporting roles. Written by Govind Padman and Mahesh Mithra, it is a remake of their Malayalam film Ee Parakkum Thalika (2001). The music was composed by Bharani, with editing done by P. C. Mohanan. The film released on 30 August 2002.

== Plot ==
Gopikrishna (Murali) owns and drives an old bus which was received as compensation for his father's road accident. Gopi now faces many consequences due to the bus's pathetic condition. He had sold many valuable things to maintain the bus, and his friend Azhagu (Vadivelu) was his only companion and the bus's cleaner. A mouse had eaten Azhagu's passport and spoiled his chances of going abroad. Some part of the film's comedy involves Azhagu running behind the mouse for revenge. A live TV show in which Gopi insults the City Traffic Commissioner (Vinu Chakravarthy) lands him in more trouble when the latter commands Gopi to leave the city with the bus. His other friends, lawyers, and well-wishers try to help him with a bank loan to convert his bus into a food truck. The plot took a turn when a girl named Vasanthi (Radha) enters the bus as a nomad, but she was actually Gayathri, the daughter of an influential and politically powerful minister (P. Vasu) in Puducherry. Her father forced her to join politics, which made her leave home. Initially, Gayathri declines to leave the bus, despite Azhagu's and Gopi's constant efforts. The police traces her and takes her back to her father's custody. Her father was making arrangements for her marriage with someone else. Meanwhile, Gopi realised that he could not live without Gayathri. Gopi and Azhagu secretly enter her house, and finally, all ends well as he wins over Gayathri's father.

== Cast ==
- Murali as Gopikrishna
- Radha as Gayathri / Vasanthi
  - Sanusha as young Gayathri
- Vadivelu as Azhagu
- P. Vasu as Santhanam, Gayathri's father
- Sabitha Anand as Lakshmi, Gayathri's mother
- Vinu Chakravarthy as City Traffic Commissioner Veerappan
- Lavanya as TV Reporter
- Manivannan as Mahendran
- Delhi Ganesh as Krishnan Pillai
- Madhan Bob as Moneylender
- Ilavarasu as Parotta Master Kasi
- Pandu as Police Inspector
- Bala Singh as Politician
- Bonda Mani as Groom

== Production ==
The film's shooting commenced at Kodaikanal, and held at locations in Kerala and Thenkasi.

== Soundtrack ==
The soundtrack was composed by Bharani. The song "Kannum Kannum" was later reused as "Ding Ding" in the Telugu film Siva Rama Raju.

Track listing
No.	Title	Lyrics	Singer(s)	Length
1.	"Adada Oorkulathil"	Pa. Vijay	Swarnalatha, Tippu	4:51
2.	"Nee Sandhanam Poosiya"	Newton	P. Jayachandran	5:09
3.	"Sundara Travels"	Snehan	Tippu	3:40
4.	"En Nenjukkul Veesiya"	Newton	P. Unnikrishnan	5:09
5.	"Malligai Poovukku"	Pa. Vijay	P. Jayachandran	4:52
6.	"Kannum Kannum"	Snehan	Krishnaraj	4:33
Total length:				28:14

== Critical reception ==
Malini Mannath of Chennai Online wrote, "‘Sundara Travels' originally made in Malayalam as 'ee Parakkum Thaliga' was scripted and directed by Thaha and was a success in Kerala. So were its versions in Telugu and Kannada. Thaha directs the Tamil version, and probably to go with the so called ‘nativity’ factor, it is comedy that’s a bit too loud for comfort".

S. R. Ashok Kumar of The Hindu wrote, "The director starts off very well but loses steam midway and presents something predictable".
