= Thayagam =

- Poster
- Directed by: A. R. Ramesh
- Screenplay by: Nethaji M
- Story by: Raja Rajendran
- Produced by: S. Mani; S. Ramuvasanthan; A. S. Ibrahim Rowther(presenter)
- Starring: Vijayakanth; Napoleon; Ranjitha; Mohini
- Cinematography: Rajarajan
- Edited by: G. Jeyachandran
- Music by: Deva
- Production company: Seranaadu Movie Creations
- Release date: 15 January 1996
- Running time: 155 minutes
- Country: India
- Language: Tamil

Thayagam (/θɑːjəɡəm/ transl. Motherland) is a 1996 Indian Tamil-language action film directed by A. R. Ramesh. The film stars Vijayakanth, Ranjitha, Napoleon and Mohini. It was released on 15 January 1996. Vijayakanth won Tamil Nadu State Film Award Special Prize for this film.

== Plot ==
Three death row prisoners escape from the jail and hijack a plane where Abdul Salim, a scientist, owns a miracle drug. The pilot, instead of listening to the hijackers' instruction, manages to land in the Kashmir mountain. There, Snobir, a sadistic terrorist leader threatens the passengers to recover the drugs. The pilot and the national boxing champion Pailwan plan to save the passengers and try to escape but they are caught during the plan and are taken as prisoners. Both attack and kill many terrorists; everyone escapes and everything goes smoothly until an ambush occurs on a bridge. The brave Pailwan sacrifices himself to save the pilot and the passengers. Elsewhere, the short-tempered Sakthivel who is a family friend of Abdul Salim, and Abdul Salim's daughter Shakeela plan to save everyone so they find their crashed plane and they enter as prisoners. Sakthivel also lies that he is the scientist and tells the terrorist head to release everyone. The film ends with Sakthivel single-handedly killing all the terrorists and saving the day.

== Cast ==
- Vijayakanth as Sakthivel
- Arun Pandian as Bailwan (Extended Guest Appearance)
- Napoleon as Pilot
- Ranjitha as Shakeela
- Mohini as Abirami
- Mansoor Ali Khan as Snow Bear
- Laxmi Rattan as Abdul Salim
- Kazan Khan as Sunil, a traitor
- Peeli Sivam as Saamikannu, Sakthivel's father
- Thyagu as a hostage
- Vivek as a hostage
- Balu Anand as a hostage
- Kaviyasri as Sarasu, a hostage
- Vijay Eswaran
- Sakthivel as a traitor
- Peter Yang as a hostage
- Kamalesh as a hostage
- Vaithi
- Mohan Raman
- Baby Jennifer as Angela
- Kalyan in a special appearance

== Soundtrack ==
The music was composed by Deva, with lyrics written by Piraisoodan. The song "En Kannil" is based on "In The Name of Love" by Grover Washington Jr. from Winelight.

Song	Singer(s)	Duration
"Cu Cu Tara"	K. S. Chithra, Malaysia Vasudevan	4:48
"Monalisa"	Mano, K. S. Chithra	4:52
"Oru Indiya Paravai"	K. S. Chithra, S. Kuzhanthaivelu	5:06
"Rangeela"	Gopal Sharma	4:28
"Yen Kannil"	K. J. Yesudas, K. S. Chithra	5:29

== Reception ==
Thayagam was originally slated to be released on Diwali 1995. Kalki called dialogues, cinematography and grandeur as positives but felt Arun Pandian, Ranjitha and Napoleon were wasted and concluded saying what can one say and praise the director who has given a comedy film with an action coating with a serious subject like Kashmir. D. S. Ramanujam of The Hindu wrote, "Thaayagam, a costly movie made in the snowy regions, will offer visual thrill and action, despite the obvious flaws in narration and screenplay". He added, "Netaji's dialogue driving home this bitter truth. But his screenplay has lot of loopholes, which the director A. R. Ramesh has not corrected". The film won the Tamil Nadu State Film Special Award for Best Actor (Vijayakanth) and Best Lyricist (Piraisoodan).
