= Rajasthan (film) =

1999 Indian film by R.K. Selvamani

- Title card
- Directed by: R. K. Selvamani
- Written by: R. S. Bhuvan (dialogues)
- Screenplay by: R. K. Selvamani
- Story by: R. K. Selvamani
- Produced by: Nambirajan Yadav
- Starring: Sarathkumar; Vijayashanti
- Cinematography: Saroojpaadhi
- Edited by: Anil Malnad
- Music by: Ilaiyaraaja
- Production company: Ganesh Films
- Release date: 1 May 1999
- Running time: 155 minutes
- Country: India
- Language: Tamil

Rajasthan (/rɑːdʒəsθɑːn/) is a 1999 Indian Tamil-language action thriller film directed and co-written by R. K. Selvamani. The film stars Sarathkumar and Vijayashanti. It was released on 1 May 1999.

== Plot ==
When terrorists infiltrate India to attack nuclear scientists, the government forms a special task force that includes top policemen and a policewoman.

== Cast ==
- Sarathkumar as Hariharan IPS in STF
- Vijayashanti as SP Gayathri IPS in CBI also in STF
- Manjula as a terrorist Shabana
- Manivannan as a cook
- Vadivelu
- Babloo
- Satya Prakash as Saddam
- Ajay Rathnam as ACP
- Rajan P. Dev
- Madhan Bob
- Mohan Ram
- Devan
- Ponnambalam
- Thalaivasal Vijay as Police officer
- Srividya
- Alphonsa
- Chandini as Hariharan's sister
- Ragasudha as Hariharan's sister
- Prakash Raj (uncredited)

Telugu version

- Brahmanandam as cook
- Ali
- Chitti Babu
- Visweswara Rao

== Production ==
The film's launch and inaugural shoot took place at YMCA Grounds, Chennai.

== Soundtrack ==
Soundtrack was composed by Ilaiyaraaja.

Track listing
No.	Title	Singer(s)	Length
1.	"Jai Jawan"	Arunmozhi, T. L. Maharajan
2.	"Machan"	S. Janaki, K. S. Chithra
3.	"Jil Jilara"	Mano, Sunandha
4.	"Sorgathil"	Shankar Mahadevan, Bhavatharini
5.	"Siragadikkra"	S. N. Surendar
6.	"Pennendral"	Unnikrishnan, Sujatha

== Release and reception ==
Rajasthan was released on 1 May 1999, delayed from April. K. P. S. of Kalki praised Ilaiyaraaja's background score and found Sarathkumar's fights and his duet with Vijayshanthi as funnier and concluded the reality is that Pokhran, which did not help Vajpayee, is not going to help Selvamani. K. N. Vijiyan of New Straits Times said the film "should appeal to all those who like plenty of action and Sarath Kumar fans". D. S. Ramanujam of The Hindu wrote, "Sarath Kumar is hampered by inadequate support from the screenplay and dialogue".
