= L. N. Shastri =

Background information
- Also known as: Chaitanya
- Born: 30 August 1971; Keelara, Mandya district, Karnataka, India
- Died: 30 August 2017 (aged 46) Bengaluru, Karnataka
- Genre: Playback singing
- Occupations: Singer, Composer
- Years active: 1991–2017

L. N. Shastri (also credited as Chaitanya; 30 August 1971 – 30 August 2017) was an Indian playback singer and music composer who primarily worked in Kannada cinema. Starting his career as a playback singer in the film Ajagajantara (1991), Shastri went on to sing more than 3,000 songs.

Under the name of Chaitanya, he composed music for over 25 films starting with Kanasalu Neene Manasalu Neene (1998). However, he dropped the name due to the identity crisis for the film Bellary Naga (2009).

His biggest hit song as a singer has been "Kolumande Jangamadevaru" from the film Janumada Jodi (1996) which gave him a career break and also fetched him the Karnataka State Film Award for Best Male Playback Singer. He was closely associated with prominent music directors in Kannada film industry including Hamsalekha, V. Manohar, V. Harikrishna, Gurukiran, Arjun Janya and Anoop Seelin. Hamsalekha who has been the main support for his growing career since his initial days.

L. N. Shastri was married to fellow singer Suma. Suma Shastri has sung for more than 50 films.

== Career ==
In the early 1990s, Shastri was mainly seen singing track songs for major playback singers like S. P. Balasubrahmanyam and others. The film Ajagajantara (1991) composed by Hamsalekha offered him a chance to share the mic with Balasubrahmanyam for the song "Love Love Loveah". Following this, Shastri teamed up with composer V. Manohar and sang many songs for the films that featured actor Jaggesh in the lead. The songs "Anthintha Gandu Naanalla" from Bhanda Nanna Ganda (1992), "Priya Priya" from Super Nanna Maga (1992), "Dagar Dagar" from Tharle Nan Maga (1992), "Avanalli Ivalilli" from Shhh (1993) were some of his early hits which appealed to the masses. In the meantime, Shastri was working as an assistant composer to both Hamsalekha and V. Manohar for all their films.

In 1996, the folk song "Kolumande Jangamadevaru" composed by V. Manohar and picturized on actor Shiva Rajkumar for the film Janumada Jodi turned his fortunes. The song became an ultimate hit and his rendition was widely acclaimed by critics and masses. He was awarded the Karnataka State Award for this song. Following this, he recorded many songs for all the music directors of the 1990s through 2000s. Many of his songs have been received extremely well by the masses.

In 1998, Shastri turned into a complete music director with the film Kanasalu Neene Manasalu Neene. Though the songs were received well, the film's dismal performance at the box-office could not help boost the songs. His next composition for the V. Ravichandran starrer Ravimama (1999) was also appreciated. Following this, he composed for about 25 feature films which could not help him to be among the top ranking music directors. His rechristened name Chaitanya was familiar only inside the film fraternity and the audience could not relate his new name with his original name.

On insistence of actor Dr. Vishnuvardhan, his original name was credited with his compositions for the film Bellary Naga (2009) which proved to be the last feature film of the legendary actor. After a brief hiatus, Shastri returned to composing for the films Flop (2015) and Melody (2015) which marked his reunion with director Nanjunda who gave him the first break as a composer.

== Discography ==
=== As composer ===
Year	Film title	Notes
1998	Kanasalu Neene Manasalu Neene	Debut film Credited as Chaitanya
1999	Ravimama	
2000	Mava Mava Maduve Mado	
2001	Amma Ninna Tholinalli	
2001	Aunty Preethse	
2001	Haalu Sakkare	
2002	Ninagoskara	
2003	Mooru Manasu Nooru Kanasu	
2003	Nagabharana	
2003	Hey Nan Bheeshma Kano	
2003	Preetisle Beku	
2004	Preethi Nee Illade Naa Hegirali	
2004	Ayyo Pandu	
2004	Sakhi	
2008	Hogi Baa Magale	
2009	Bellary Naga	Credited as L. N. Shastry
2010	Deadly-2	
2015	Flop	
2015	Melody	

=== As singer (selected) ===
Year	Film	Song name	Music Director	Co-singer(s)	Notes
1991	Ajagajantara	"Love Love Loveah"	Hamsalekha	Debut song	
1992	Bhanda Nanna Ganda	"Yaarigu Endigu" "Preethiya Theranu"	V. Manohar		
1992	Alli Ramachari Illi Brahmachari	"Achu Mechu" "Banda Banda Ramayya" "Entha Sundara" "Jumma Jumma"	V. Manohar		
1993	Sshhh	"Avanalli Ivalilli"	Sadhu Kokila		
1993	Gejje Naada	"Somavara Santhege"	V. Manohar		
1994	Panjarada Gili	"Naana Naana"	V. Manohar		
1996	Janumada Jodi	"Kolumande Jangamadevaru"	V. Manohar	Karnataka State Film Award for Best Male Playback Singer	
1996	Sipayi	"Vanditha Kirana" "Odo Chandira" "Karago Chandira"	Hamsalekha		
1997	O Mallige	"O Mallige Ninnade Haadidu"	V. Manohar		
1997	Jodi Hakki	"Laali Suvvali"	V. Manohar		
1998	A	"Chandini" "Helkollakonduru" "Idu One Day Match"	Gurukiran		
1998	Kanasalu Neene Manasalu Neene	"Anuraagada Ale Mele"	L. N. Shastri		
1998	Preethsod Thappa	"Ondu Moda"	Hamsalekha		
1999	Naanu Nanna Hendthiru	"Ready 123" "Ee Jagave Namadu" "Ee Bhoomige"	V. Ravichandran		
2001	Ekangi	"Ee Chitte Thara"	V. Ravichandran		
2004	Malla	"Karunade" "Mangalyam" "Angada Angada"	V. Ravichandran		
2005	Aham Premasmi	"Yadha Yadhahi" "Oh Premave" "Eshwar"	V. Ravichandran		
2007	Dheemantha Manushya	"Jeevarashiya Amara"	A. Karthik Raja		
2007	Right Adre	"Kudkondu Thooradkondu"	Neel		
2007	Chanda	"Gundene Dyavru"	S. Narayan		
2009	Bhagyada Balegara	"Budu Budu Kavya"	Ilaiyaraaja		
2013	B3	"Bitthri"	Anoop Seelin		
2014	Adyaksha	"Adyaksha Adyaksha"	Arjun Janya	Puneeth Rajkumar	
2014	Love in Mandya	"Lo Maava"	Anoop Seelin		
2016	Neer Dose	"Neer Dose, Neer Dose"	Anoop Seelin		

== Awards ==
=== Karnataka State Film Awards ===
- 1996 – Karnataka State Film Award for Best Male Playback Singer – "Kolumande Jangamadevaru" (film: Janumada Jodi)

== Death ==
L. N. Shastri died on 30 August 2017, after a brief battle with intestinal cancer.
