= Bhoomika (film) =

- Directed by: I. V. Sasi
- Written by: S. Balachandran
- Screenplay by: John Paul
- Produced by: John Paul; M. G. Soman
- Starring: Jayaram; Suresh Gopi; Sai Kumar; Mukesh; Urvashi
- Cinematography: J. Williams
- Edited by: K. Narayanan
- Music by: Raveendran
- Production company: Chithirasri
- Distributed by: Chithirasri
- Release date: 1991
- Country: India
- Language: Malayalam

Bhoomika is a 1991 Indian Malayalam-language film directed by I. V. Sasi and produced by John Paul and M. G. Soman. The film stars Jayaram, Suresh Gopi, Sai Kumar, Mukesh and Urvashi in the lead roles. The film has musical score by Raveendran.

== Cast ==
- Jayaram as SI Unnikrishnan
- Suresh Gopi as Gopi
- Sai Kumar as Ravi
- Mukesh as Chandikkunju, Home Minister of Kerala
- Urvashi as Radha
- Ragasudha as Raji
- M. G. Soman as Raghavan
- Nedumudi Venu as Rama Warrier
- Karamana Janardanan Nair as Memana Madhava Panikkar
- Rizabawa as Rameshan
- Ramu as Dineshan
- Jagathi Sreekumar as Kuttappan
- Sabitha Anand as Sarada
- Mala Aravindan as Rappayi
- Innocent as Sivan Pillai
- Kanakalatha as Yasodhamma
- Sankaradi as Chellappan Pillai
- Jagannatha Varma as SP Balagopal
- KPAC Sunny as Antony
- Kuthiravattam Pappu as Pengan
- Ravi Menon as CI Chacko
- Kuttettan as Young Gopi

== Soundtrack ==
The music was composed by Raveendran.

No.	Song	Singers	Lyrics	Length (m:ss)
1	"Manassinoraayiram"	K. J. Yesudas, Sujatha Mohan	P. K. Gopi	
2	"Mele Chandrika"	K. J. Yesudas, C. O. Anto, Krishnachandran	P. K. Gopi	
3	"Mukile"	K. J. Yesudas, K. S. Chithra, Chorus	P. K. Gopi	
4	"Nellola Konduvaa"	K. J. Yesudas, Chorus	P. K. Gopi	
