= Rajesh Krishnan =

Indian playback singer

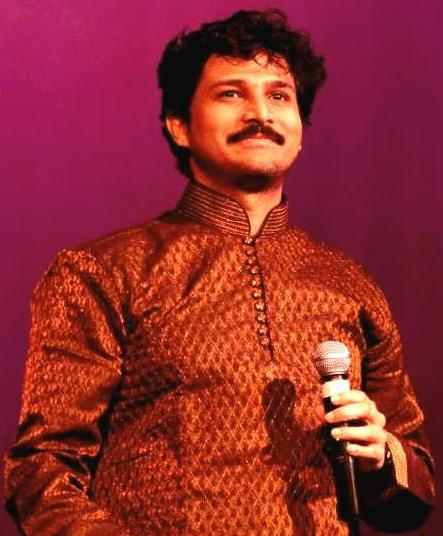
- Born: Bangalore, Karnataka, India
- Occupations: Playback singer; actor; musician; dubbing artist
- Years active: 1991–present
- Spouses: Sowmya Raoh (m. 1998; div. 1999) Haripriya (m. 2010; div. 2010) Ramya Vasishta (m. 2011; div. 2013)
- Awards: Filmfare Awards; Karnataka State Film Awards; Suvarna Film Awards; Udaya Film Awards; Nandi Awards; SIIMA Awards
- Musical career
- Genres: Playback singing; Filmi
- Instrument: Vocals

Rajesh Krishnan is an Indian playback singer, actor, and dubbing artist best known for his work in Kannada cinema, in addition to Telugu and Tamil films. He made his mainstream playback debut with “Mathinalle Gellaballe” in the Kannada film Gowri Ganesha (1991), and rose to prominence through a prolific run of 1990s–2000s hits, including Kannada numbers such as “Nooru Janmaku” (America America), “Kariya I Love You” (Duniya), “Suntara Gaali” (Kalasipalya), and “Onde Usirante” (Snehaloka). In Telugu, his breakout “Yeto Vellipoyindi Manasu” from Ninne Pelladatha (1996) earned him the Nandi Award for Best Male Playback Singer.

Across a career spanning over three decades, Rajesh has sung over 3,000 film songs in Kannada, over 300 in other languages such as Telugu, Malayalam and Tamil. He has also recorded numerous songs in Tulu and Lambani. In Hindi cinema, he has sung about 20 songs, including few for dubbed films. Rajesh has been recognized with multiple honors, including the Karnataka State Film Awards (Best Male Playback Singer—3 times), Filmfare South nomination (Best Supporting Actor for Gaalipata, 2008) for his acting, and the SIIMA for Best Male Playback Singer for “Kaarmoda” from Mr. and Mrs. Ramachari (2014). He has also recorded devotional and private albums that remain widely available on streaming platforms.

== Early life ==
Rajesh was born in Bengaluru, India in a musical family; his mother is a Carnatic vocalist whom he credit as his first musical mentor. He studied at St. Joseph's Indian High School, representing the school at a children’s film festival at age 13, before taking up professional singing under composers including Hamsalekha. His first film song was recorded in 1991, when he was 17. His initial singing assignments were limited to track singing where an accomplished playback singer, mostly S. P. Balasubrahmanyam, would record the release version.

== Career ==
=== Playback singing ===
Rajesh began singing under the direction of composers Rajan-Nagendra and Hamsalekha in the late 1980s, where he recorded tracks in his voice upon which other professional singers would cover with their voices. In 1991, Rajesh's voice was retained and released in the final soundtrack album of Gowri Ganesha. The song "Mathinalle Gellaballe", composed by Rajan-Nagendra was the first official release song. This was quickly followed by songs from the films, Hoovu Hannu (1993) and Bevu Bella (1993), both composed by Hamsalekha, which raised his popularity among Kannada audience.

For his rendition in films such as Bannada Hejje (1999), Ekangi (2002) and Dumbee (2003), Rajesh won Karnataka State Film Award for Best Male Playback Singer.

Following these initial breakthrough films, Rajesh was one of the most sought-after singers in Kannada cinema. He went on to sing for numerous other composers such as V. Manohar, L. N. Shastry, Sadhu Kokila, S. A. Rajkumar and Rajesh Ramanath in the 1990s and 2000s. Later in the 2010s and 2020s, composers such as V. Harikrishna, Arjun Janya, B. Ajaneesh Loknath, Manikanth Kadri, Ravi Basrur and Charan Raj chose Rajesh's voice for their songs. He went on to sing more than 3000 songs in Kannada cinema making him the first ever singer from Karnataka to sing those many songs in films.

Rajesh expanded to Telugu cinema through Sandeep Chowta's musical Ninne Pelladatha in 1996. The song "Yeto Vellipoyindi Manasu" reached popularity immediately after release and earned him the Nandi Award for Best Male Playback Singer. Following this, he was offered many other Telugu songs in films including Raja (1999), Prema Katha (1999), Nee Kosam (1999), Nuvvu Vasthavani (2000), Kalisundam Raa (2000), Ninne Premistha (2001), Santosham (2002) and Lakshmi (2006). In Tamil, his song "Megamai Vandhu Pogiren" for the film Thullatha Manamum Thullum (1999) was received with wide appreciation.

=== Acting ===
Rajesh made his first onscreen appearance with a Telugu film, Ori Nee Prema Bangaram Kaanu in 2003. He played the lead character which was not well received by critics who criticized his acting skills.. This was followed by yet another failed appearance in the Kannada film, Santhosha in 2004.

Later in 2008, Rajesh was roped in to play one of the lead characters in Yogaraj Bhat's multi-starrer Kannada film, Gaalipata.. He played the role Kitty, an engineer and one of the three main friends alongside Ganesh and Diganth. The film met with positive reviews from critics and also appreciation for all the lead actors. Rajesh was nominated at the Filmfare Awards South under Best Supporting Actor category. After Gaalipata, Rajesh took a break from acting and focussed on his singing career. However, upon insistence of his friend and fellow singer, L. N. Shastri, he took up the lead role offer in the 2015 musical film, Melody. The film met with mixed reviews and underperformed at the box-office.

== Personal life ==
Rajesh Krishnan has been married and divorced to Sowmya Raoh (singer), Haripriya (dentist) and Ramya Vasishta (TV anchor and singer).

== Television ==
Rajesh began his television journey as a judge on Zee Kannada's Sa Re Ga Ma Pa, the Kannada adaptation of the national singing reality franchise. He joined the judging panel from its early seasons and has since become a recurring presence, bringing his extensive playback experience to mentor emerging talent. Over the years, Krishnan has shared the judges’ seat alongside musicians Vijay Prakash, Arjun Janya, and, in earlier seasons, Hamsalekha. He has been part of multiple seasons, including Season 13 (2017), Season 17 (2020–2022), and the Season 21 (2024–2025).

== Filmography ==
=== As actor ===
Year	Film	Role	Notes	Ref.
2003	Ori Nee Prema Bangaram Kaanu	Rajesh	Telugu film	
2004	Santhosha	Rajesh		
2008	Gaalipata	Kitty	Nominated—Filmfare Award for Best Supporting Actor	
2015	Melody	Kiran		

=== Dubbing artist ===
Year	Film	Actor	Notes
2001	Nanna Preethiya Hudugi	Dhyan	
2003	Paris Pranaya	Raghu Mukherjee	
2005	Amrithadhare	Dhyan	
2014	Mr. and Mrs. Ramachari	Dhyan	

== Partial discography ==
=== Telugu songs ===
Year	Film	Song	Composer(s)	Co-singer(s)
1996	Ninne Pelladata	"Yeto Vellipoyindi"	Sandeep Chowta	
1996	Ninne Pelladata	"Naa Mogudu Rampyari"	Sandeep Chowta	
1996	Ninne Pelladata	"Ninne Pelladesthananth"	Sandeep Chowta	
1997	Master	"Intiloki Welcome"	Deva	Sowmya
1997	Master	"B.SC Aynagani"	Deva	Chandrabose, Krishanraj
1997	Master	"Bavunnara"	Deva	Sowmya
1998	All Rounder	"Yeppudeppudo"	Swaraveenapani	Anuradha Sriram
1998	Auto Driver	"Akkineni Akkineni"	Deva	Sujatha Mohan
1998	Chandralekha	"Tajmahaluni"	Sandeep Chowta	
1998	Chandralekha	"Urumulu Nee Muvvalai"	Sandeep Chowta	
1998	Chandralekha	"Mogali Podalu"	Sandeep Chowta	
1998	Sathya	"Galliloni Matti Mattiki"	Vishal Bhardwaj	
1999	Sneham Kosam	"Meesamunna Nesthama"	S. A. Rajkumar	
1999	Nee Kosam	"Nee Kosam"	R. P. Patnaik	Kousalya
1999	Mallika	"Chalo Chalo"	Sandeep Chowta	
1999	Mallika	"Em Ayindho"	Sandeep Chowta	
1999	Mallika	"Aat Maane"	Sandeep Chowta	
1999	Mallika	"Yi Uella"	Sandeep Chowta	
1999	Raja	"Kavvinchake O Prema"	S. A. Rajkumar	Sujatha Mohan
1999	Prema Katha	"Nee Kosam"	Sandeep Chowta	
1999	Prema Katha	"Devudu Karunisthadani"	Sandeep Chowta	Anuradha Sriram
1999	Prema Katha	"Kokkaroko"	Sandeep Chowta	
1999	Preminche Manasu	"Nee Choopu Chalamma"	S. A. Rajkumar	
1999	Preminche Manasu	"Evare Cheli Nuvvevare"	S. A. Rajkumar	
1999	Preminche Manasu	"My Dear My Dear"	S. A. Rajkumar	Smitha
2000	Nuvvu Vastavani	"Meghamai Nenu Vachanu"	S. A. Rajkumar	Sujatha Mohan
2000	Manasunna Maaraju	"O Prema"	Vandemataram Srinivas	
2000	Ninne Premistha	"Prema Endukani"	S. A. Rajkumar	K. S. Chithra
2000	Ninne Premistha	"Gudi Gantalu"	S. A. Rajkumar	K. S. Chithra
2000	Devullu	"Shanti Nikethana"	Vandemataram Srinivas	K. S. Chithra
2000	Kalisundam Raa	"Kalisunte Kaladu"	S. A. Rajkumar	
2000	Adavi (D)	"Ninne Choosina"	Sandeep Chowta	
2000	Adavi (D)	"Ee Prema Pakshulu"	Sandeep Chowta	
2000	Adavi (D)	"Priya Ninu Cheeredareedi"	Sandeep Chowta	
2000	Adavi (D)	"Chinna Nadumu Chilaka Mukku"	Sandeep Chowta	
2000	Adavi (D)	"Ayyo Ayyo Rama"	Sandeep Chowta	
2000	Ravanna	"Nuvvante Chala"	S. A. Rajkumar	K. S. Chithra
2000	Tirumala Tirupati Venkatesa	"Nadumu Vompulo"	Vandemataram Srinivas	K. S. Chithra
2000	Pelli Sambandham	"Atchi Butchi"	S. A. Rajkumar	Swarnalatha
2000	Pelli Sambandham	"Bhale Bhale"	S. A. Rajkumar	Swarnalatha
2001	Naa Manasistha Raa	"Twinkle Twinkle"	S. A. Rajkumar	Sunita
2001	Naa Manasistha Raa	"Kadantava"	S. A. Rajkumar	Sunita
2001	Snehamante Idera	"Naa Pedaviki Navvulu"	Shiva Shankar	Sujatha
2002	Santosham	"Nuvvante Naakisthtam"	R. P. Patnaik	Usha
2002	Nuvve Nuvve	"Ammayi Nachesindi"	Koti	Kousalya
2002	Nee Sneham	"Emo Aunemo"	R. P. Patnaik	Usha
2003	Toli Choopulone	"Pagadala Pedavipai"	Chakri	Harini
2003	Vijayam	"Hampilo Silpalu"	Koti	
2003	Vijayam	"Kushalama O Priya"	Koti	K. S. Chithra
2004	Monalisa (D)	"O Priyathama"	Valisha-Sandeep	
2004	Monalisa (D)	"Naa Manasantha"	Valisha-Sandeep	Sunidhi Chauhan
2004	Intlo Srimathi Veedhilo Kumari	"Nee Ollo Ne Nerchu"	Ghantadi Krishna	Shreya Ghoshal
2004	Kushi Kushiga	"Godari Gattundi"	S. A. Rajkumar	Shreya Ghoshal
2004	Kushi Kushiga	"Preminche"	S. A. Rajkumar	
2005	Keelu Gurram	"Aa Keelu Gurramla"	S. A. Rajkumar	Malathi
2005	Keelu Gurram	"Ko Ko Ko Koyila"	S. A. Rajkumar	Mathangi
2005	Sri	"Prema Prema"	Sandeep Chowta	
2005	Sri	"Are Chi Chi"	Sandeep Chowta	
2005	Sri	"Holi Holi"	Sandeep Chowta	
2006	Lakshmi	"Ne Puttindi Neekosame"	Ramana Gogula	Ganga
2006	Astram	"Undipo Nesthama"	S. A. Rajkumar	K. S. Chithra
2006	Astram	"Prema Kanna"	S. A. Rajkumar	Ananthu
2006	Andala Ramudu	"Jabilli Raave"	S. A. Rajkumar	Shreya Ghoshal
2006	Andala Ramudu	"Seethakoka"	S. A. Rajkumar	Sujatha Mohan
2007	Maharathi	"Balakrishna"	Gurukiran	
2007	Chandamama	"Buggey Bangarama"	K. M. Radhakrishnan	
2008	Chintakayala Ravi	"Merupula Merise"	Vishal–Shekhar	Shreya Ghoshal
2010	Maa Annayya Bangaram	"Mallee Mallee"	S. A. Rajkumar	Rita
2024	Swag	"Neelo Naalo"	Vivek Sagar	Anjana Sowmya

=== Tamil songs ===
Year	Film	Song	Composer(s)	Co-singer(s)
1995	Murai Mappillai	"Akka Magale"	Swararaj	
1996	Unnaiye Kalyanam Pannikiren (D)	"Dhisai Maari Poyachu"	Sandeep Chowta	
1999	Thullatha Manamum Thullum	"Megamai Vandhu Pogiren"	S. A. Rajkumar	
2000	Unnai Kodu Ennai Tharuven	"Sollu Thalaiva"	S. A. Rajkumar	
2000	Ennavalle	"Raa Raa Rajakumara"	S. A. Rajkumar	Sujatha Mohan
2002	Raja	"Nee Paarkinrai"	S. A. Rajkumar	
2006	Vattaram	"Idhu Kadhal"	Bharadwaj	
2014	Jaihind 2	"Ayyaa Padichavare"	Arjun Janya	Gana Bala
2016	Parandhu Sella Vaa	"Man Meedhu"	Joshua Sridhar	

=== Hindi songs ===
Year	Song	Film	Music	Lyrics	Co-singer(s)	Notes
1996	"Yahin Kahin Khoya"	Jab Dil Kisi Pe Aata Hai (D)	Sandeep Chowta			
2002	"Krishna Hare"	Bollywood/Hollywood	Sandeep Chowta			

== Awards ==
Karnataka State Film Awards:

- 2000 – Best Male Playback Singer – Bannada Hejje (Song: "Nagu Bandaroo Alu Bandaroo")
- 2002 – Best Male Playback Singer – Ekangi (Song: "Hudugi Superamma")
- 2003 – Best Male Playback Singer – Dumbee (Song: "Kshamiseya")

Nandi Awards:

- 1996 – Best Male Playback Singer – Ninne Pelladatha (Song: "Yeto Vellipoyindi Manasu")

South Indian International Movie Awards:

- 2014 – SIIMA Award for Best Male Playback Singer - Kannada – Mr. and Mrs. Ramachari (Song: "Kaarmoda Suridu")
