= Sathyaraj filmography =

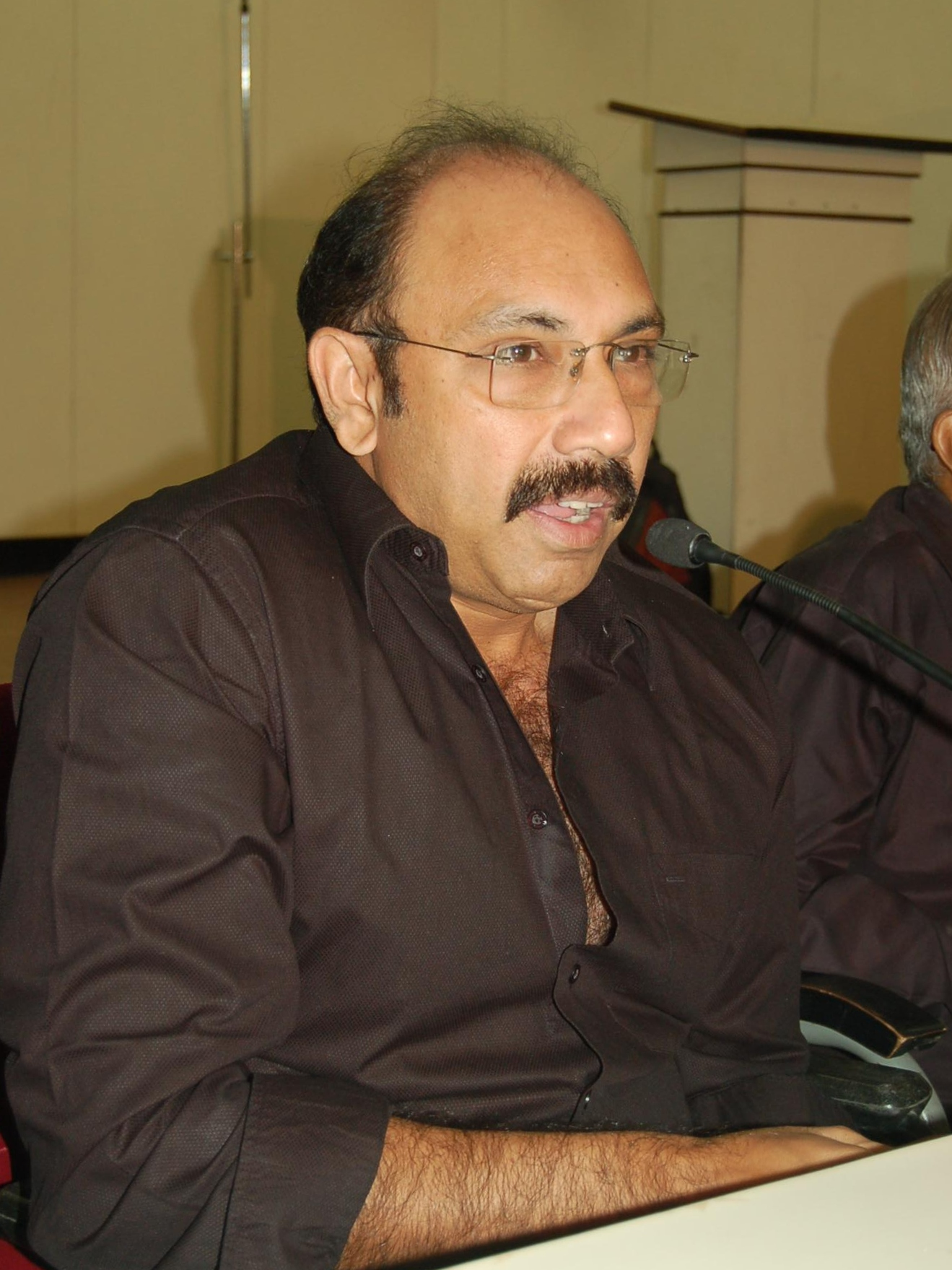
Sathiyaraj in 2007

Sathyaraj is an Indian actor and film producer who has predominantly appeared in Tamil cinema. He started his career playing villains, supporting roles and character roles. Later, he played the lead in the films Saavi (1985) and Kadalora Kavithaigal (1986). He also acted as Periyar in the Tamil Nadu government-sponsored film of the same name (2007). He was also the director of the film Villadhi Villain (1995), starring himself in three different roles.

Apart from his film career, Sathyaraj has been vocal in the media about various issues, such as Sri Lankan Tamil nationalism and water rights in Tamil Nadu. In 2011, he had a brief career as a television host for the game show Home Sweet Home on STAR Vijay. He has also served as a brand ambassador for Pothys, Sri Kumaran Jewelry Shop and AVR Jewellery Shop.

== As an actor ==
Key
†	Denotes films that have not yet been released

=== Films ===
==== Tamil films ====
List of Tamil film acting credits
Year	Title	Role	Notes	Ref.
1978	Sattam En Kaiyil	Vicky		
1978	Kannan Oru Kai Kuzhandhai	Henchman		
1979	Enippadigal	Muthu		
1979	Muthal Iravu			
1980	Karumbu Vil			
1980	Samanthipoo	Sakthi's elder brother		
1980	Raman Parasuraman	Thief		
1980	Kuruvikoodu	Raju		
1981	Aani Ver	Malaimannnan		
1981	Avasarakkari			
1982	Hitler Umanath	Samu		
1982	Theerpugal Thiruththapadalam	Lawrence		
1982	Moondru Mugam	"Dhaadi" Raj		
1982	Pagadai Panirendu	Henchman		
1982	Nadodi Raja	Shekhar		
1983	Paayum Puli	Gangster		
1983	Urangatha Ninaivugal	Amar		
1983	Seerum Singangal	Henchman		
1983	Sandhippu	Dany		
1983	Saranalayam	Magician		
1983	Thangaikkor Geetham	Nayaka		
1984	Naan Mahaan Alla	Jagan		
1984	Chiranjeevi	Vetri		
1984	Nooravathu Naal	Jayaraj		
1984	Sattathai Thiruthungal	Sarassi		
1984	24 Mani Neram	X. W. Ramarathinam		
1984	Thambikku Entha Ooru	Muthuvel		
1984	Naalai Unathu Naal	David		
1984	Enakkul Oruvan	Rajadurai		
1984	Unga Veettu Pillai	Kitty		
1984	January 1	Robert		
1984	Nichayam			
1985	Santhosha Kanavukal	Villain		
1985	Chain Jayapal	Henchman		
1985	Erimalai	Visvam		
1985	Kaakki Sattai	Vicky		
1985	Raman Sreeraman	Shankar		
1985	Naan Sigappu Manithan	Mohanraj		
1985	Needhiyin Nizhal	Nagaraj		
1985	Pillai Nila	Convio		
1985	Anbin Mugavari	Karuppu		
1985	Pagal Nilavu	Devarajan		
1985	Anni	Rajali		
1985	Kaaval	Inspector K.S Lingam		
1985	Aagaya Thamaraigal	Chinna Kaalai		
1985	Geethanjali	Anthony		
1985	Veli	Laksmikanthan		
1985	Muthal Mariyathai	Mayilvaganam		
1985	Eetti	Sathyam		
1985	Sri Raghavendra	Nawab of Adoni		
1985	Mangamma Sapatham	Boopathy		
1985	Arthamulla Aasaigal	Prabhu		
1985	Saavi	Vijaykumar		
1985	Thiramai	Mr. Brigadier		
1985	Pattuchelai	Ramasamy		
1985	Japanil Kalyanaraman	Narendran		
1986	Karimedu Karuvayan	Police inspector	Guest appearance	
1986	Mr. Bharath	Gopinath		
1986	Vikram	Sugirtharaja		
1986	Kadaikan Paarvai	Durai		
1986	Rasigan Oru Rasigai	R.K.		
1986	Murattu Karangal	Kabali		
1986	Iravu Pookkal	Inspector Rajadurai		
1986	Raja Nee Vaazhga	R.K. Chander		
1986	Muthal Vasantham	Kunguma Pottu Gounder		
1986	Dharmam	Karthik		
1986	Kadalora Kavithaigal	Chinnappadas		
1986	Palaivana Rojakkal	Sabarathinam		
1986	Vidinja Kalyanam	'Half Boil' Aarumugam		
1986	Mandhira Punnagai	Dr. Baskar & D.S.P. Arunachalam	Dual Role	
1987	Poovizhi Vasalile	Jeeva		
1987	Vilangu	Vinod's friend	Guest appearance	
1987	Chinna Thambi Periya Thambi	Periya Thambi		
1987	Muthukkal Moondru	Sangli		
1987	Aalappirandhavan	Aalappirandhavan		
1987	Makkal En Pakkam	Samraj		
1987	Ini Oru Sudhanthiram	IPS officer	Guest appearance	
1987	Kadamai Kanniyam Kattupaadu	SI Balaram		
1987	Anjatha Singam	Vedu		
1987	Jallikattu	Arjun		
1987	Manathil Uruthi Vendum	Sathyaraj	Guest appearance	
1987	Vedham Pudhithu	Balu Thevar	Filmfare Award for Best Actor – Tamil	
1988	Annanagar Mudhal Theru	Sivaraman / Ram Singh		
1988	En Bommukutty Ammavukku	Vinod	Nominated, Filmfare Award for Best Actor – Tamil	
1988	Kazhugumalai Kallan			
1988	Ganam Courtar Avargale	Jayabhaskar		
1988	Jeeva	Jeeva		
1988	Puthiya Vaanam	M. G. Rajaratnam		
1989	Thaai Naadu	Albert (Anandhan), Brigadier Thamizharasan		
1989	Pick Pocket	Rangaraj		
1989	Chinnappadass	Chinnappadass		
1989	Annakili Sonna Kathai	Ranger		
1989	Dravidan	Raja		
1989	Vaathiyaar Veettu Pillai	Thangaraj	100th Film	
1990	Vaazhkai Chakkaram	Thangavelu		
1990	Ulagam Pirandhadhu Enakkaga	Quarter Govindhan & Raja		
1990	Madurai Veeran Enga Saami	Mathivanan &Sakthivel		
1990	Velai Kidaichuduchu	Palanisamy		
1990	Mallu Vetti Minor	Rassappa Gounder (Mallu Vetti Minor) & Marappa Gounder		
1990	Nadigan	Raja / Devaraj	Tamil Nadu State Film Award Special Prize; Nominated, Filmfare Award for Best Actor – Tamil	
1991	Pudhu Manithan	Kabali		
1991	Bramma	Ravi Varman		
1992	Rickshaw Mama	Raja		
1992	Therku Theru Machan	Subramani		
1992	Magudam	Muthuvel		
1992	Pangali	Shakthivel & Durai		
1992	Thirumathi Palanisamy	Palanisamy		
1993	Walter Vetrivel	DCP Walter Vetrivel	Cinema Express Award for Best Actor – Tamil	
1993	Kattalai	Sabaratnam		
1993	Udan Pirappu	Sathya		
1993	Airport	Captain Arjun		
1994	Amaidhi Padai	Ammavaasai & Thangavelu		
1994	Vandicholai Chinraasu	Chinnarasu		
1994	Thozhar Pandian	Pandian		
1994	Thai Maaman	Rasappan		
1994	Veera Padhakkam	Kalivardhan		
1995	Engirundho Vandhan	Kannan		
1995	Villadhi Villain	Edison, Advocate Meenakshi Sundaram & Kannan	Also director	
1995	Maaman Magal	Shanmugam		
1996	Sivasakthi	Siva		
1996	Senathipathi	Senathipathi & Sethupathi		
1997	Vallal	Durairasu		
1997	Pagaivan	Vasu		
1997	Periya Manushan	Ramakrishnan & Subramani		
1998	Kalyana Galatta	Raja Gopal		
1999	Ponnu Veetukkaran	Jeeva		
1999	Suyamvaram	Arunachalam		
1999	Malabar Police	Chinnasamy & Ramasamy		
1999	Azhagarsamy	Azhagarsamy		
2000	Veeranadai	Periya Karuppan		
2000	Ennamma Kannu	Kaasi		
2000	Unnai Kann Theduthey	Vichu (Sandanapandian I.P.S)		
2000	Puratchikkaaran	Anna		
2001	Looty	Rasappa, Jeeva and English Kuppan		
2001	Asathal	Vetri		
2001	Kunguma Pottu Gounder	Kandhasamy & Kunguma Pottu Gounder		
2001	Aandan Adimai	Sivaraman		
2002	Vivaramana Aalu	Mayilsamy		
2002	Maaran	Maaran		
2003	Ramachandra	Inspector Ramachandra		
2003	Military	Madhavan (Military)		
2003	Sena	Sena		
2003	Aalukkoru Aasai	Arivazhagan		
2004	Adi Thadi	Thirupathi		
2004	Thilak	Himself	Special appearance	
2004	Jore	Sabapathy		
2004	Sema Ragalai	Sathya		
2004	Sound Party	Kumaresan		
2004	Azhagesan	Azhagesan		
2004	Maha Nadigan	Sathya		
2005	Iyer IPS	DCP Gopal Iyer & Venkatachalapathy		
2005	Mannin Maindhan	Inspector Pratap	Guest appearance	
2005	6'2	Balamurugan (James)		
2005	Englishkaran	Thamizharasan		
2005	Vetrivel Sakthivel	Vetrivel		
2005	Vanakkam Thalaiva	Manikkam		
2006	Kovai Brothers	Ganesh		
2006	Suyetchai MLA	Nambirajan		
2006	Kurukshetram	Bharath		
2007	Adavadi	Bharath		
2007	Periyar	Periyar	Ananda Vikatan Cinema Award for Best Actor; Tamil Nadu State Film Award Special Prize; Nominated, Vijay Award for Best Actor	
2007	Kannamoochi Yenada	Arumugam Gounder		
2007	Onbadhu Roobai Nottu	Madhava Padayachi	Winner, Vijay Award for Best Actor	
2008	Thangam	Thangam		
2008	Vambu Sandai	Jeevanantham		
2010	Guru Sishyan	Guru		
2010	Pollachi Mappillai	Sengaliyappa		
2010	Irandu Mugam	Sarveswaran		
2010	Gowravargal	Thondaiman		
2011	Sattapadi Kutram	Subash Chandrabose		
2011	Vengayam	Himself	Guest appearance	
2011	Aayiram Vilakku	Lingam		
2011	Uchithanai Muharnthaal	Nadesan		
2012	Nanban	Virumandi Santhanam (Virus)	Winner, Vijay Award for Best Supporting Actor; Nominated, Filmfare Award for Best Supporting Actor – Tamil; Nominated, SIIMA Award for Best Actor in a Supporting Role	
2012	Sinam	Mani Rathnam		
2013	Nagaraja Cholan MA, MLA	Nagaraja Cholan (Ammaavaasai)	200th Film	
2013	Thalaivaa	Ramadurai		
2013	Varuthapadaatha Vaalibar Sangam	Sivanandi		
2013	Raja Rani	James	Winner, Filmfare Award for Best Supporting Actor – Tamil; Nominated, Vijay Award for Best Supporting Actor	
2014	Kalavaram	Vetriselvan		
2014	Sigaram Thodu	Inspector Chellapandian		
2014	Poojai	ADSP Sivakkozhundu		
2015	Isai	Vetriselvan		
2015	Baahubali: The Beginning	Kattappa	Winner, IIFA Utsavam Award for Best Supporting Actor; Winner, Vikatan Award Best Supporting Actor	
2015	Oru Naal Iravil	Sekar		
2016	Gethu	Thulasi Raman		
2016	Jackson Durai	Durai		
2017	Motta Shiva Ketta Shiva	Commissioner Kirubakaran IPS		
2017	Baahubali 2: The Conclusion	Kattappa	Partially reshot version; Winner, Vikatan Award Best Supporting Actor	
2017	Mersal	DCP Rathnavel		
2017	Kalavaadiya Pozhuthugal	Periyar	Guest appearance	
2018	Kadaikutty Singam	Perunazhi Ranasingam		
2018	Echcharikkai Idhu Manidhargal Nadamaadum Idam	Nataraj IPS		
2018	Nota	Mahendran		
2018	Kanaa	Murugesan	Winner, Filmfare Award for Best Supporting Actor – Tamil	
2019	Thambi	Gnanamoorthy		
2021	Tughlaq Durbar	CM "Nagaraja Chozhan" (Amavasai)	Cameo; Released on Sun TV & Netflix	
2021	MGR Magan	M. G. Ramasamy	Released on Disney+ Hotstar	
2021	Theerpugal Virkapadum	Nalan Kumar		
2022	Etharkkum Thunindhavan	Aadhirayar		
2022	Veetla Vishesham	Unnikrishnan		
2022	1945	Ramalingaiah		
2022	Prince	Ulaganathan / Veluchamy		
2022	Love Today	Venu Shastri		
2022	Connect	Arthur Samuel		
2023	Theerkadarishi	Das		
2023	Angaaragan	Adhiveera Pandiyan		
2023	Annapoorani: The Goddess of Food	Chef Anand Sundarajan		
2024	Singapore Saloon	Chakrapani		
2024	Weapon	Chezhiyan / Mithran		
2024	Mazhai Pidikkatha Manithan	Captain Prabhakaran "Captain"		
2024	Thozhar CheGuevara	CheGuevara		
2025	Baby and Baby	Mahalingam		
2025	Madras Matinee	Jyoti Ramaiah		
2025	Love Marriage	MLA Pournami	Cameo appearance	
2025	Coolie	Rajasekar		
2025	Idli Kadai	Vishnu Vardhan		
2026	Vaa Vaathiyaar	Periyasamy		
2026	Charukesi	Raagadevan		
2026	G.D.N	Ramaiah Pillai		
2026	Mandaadi	Machamuni		

==== Telugu films ====
List of Telugu film acting credits
Year	Title	Role	Notes	Ref.
1981	Iddaru Kodukulu	Seshu		
1984	Punyam Koddi Purushudu	Sarvamangalam's son		
1985	Khooni	Dilip Mukherjee		
1985	Darja Donga	Harischandra Prasad	Dubbed in Tamil as Marma Manithan	
1988	Ukku Sankelu	Raju		
2009	Sankham	Sivayya	Dubbed in Tamil as Sivappu Saamy	
2013	Mirchi	Deva	Nominated, SIIMA Award for Best Supporting Actor - Telugu	
2015	Tungabhadra	Ramaraju		
2015	Baahubali: The Beginning	Karikala Kattappa		
2016	Nenu Sailaja	Srinivasa Rao		
2016	Brahmotsavam	Chanti Babu		
2016	Hyper	Narayana Murthy		
2017	Baahubali 2: The Conclusion	Karikala Kattappa		
2019	Jersey	Coach Murthy		
2019	Prati Roju Pandage	Raghu Ramayya		
2022	1945	Ramalingaiah		
2022	Pakka Commercial	Suryanarayan		
2023	Waltair Veerayya	Satyamurthy	Guest appearance	
2024	Zebra	Baba		
2025	Hari Hara Veera Mallu	Sivananda		
2025	Tribanadhari Barbarik	Dr. Shyam Kathu		
2025	Baahubali: The Epic	Karikala Kattappa	Combined re-release version of Baahubali: The Beginning and Baahubali 2: The Conclusion	
2026	Seetha Payanam	Rajendra Prasad		

==== Hindi films ====
List of Hindi films acting credits
Year	Title	Role	Notes	Ref.
2013	Chennai Express	Durgeshwara Azhagusundaram	Hindi debut	
2022	Radhe Shyam	Paramahamsa		
2024	Munjya	Elvis Karim Prabhakar		
2025	Sikandar	Minister Rakesh Pradhan		
2025	Thamma	Elvis Karim Prabhakar	Cameo appearance	

==== Malayalam films ====
List of Malayalam films acting credits
Year	Title	Role	Notes	Ref.
2010	Aagathan	General Hareendra Varma		
2015	Lailaa O Lailaa	Shaheed Khadar	Dubbed in Tamil as Murugavel	
2023	Otta	Iyer		
2026	Khalifa: The Intro †	TBA	Filming	

==== Kannada film ====
List of Kannada film acting credits
Year	Title	Role	Notes	Ref.
1985	Shabash Vikram	Suman	Dubbed in Tamil as Kadamai Enathu Udamai	

==== Shelved films ====
Year	Title	Language	Notes	Ref.
1999	Pen Ondru Kanden	Tamil		
2000	Rosapoo Chinna Rosapoo	Tamil		
2004	Perumalsamy	Tamil		
2005	Kootani Aachi	Tamil		
2005	Devuda	Tamil		
2005	Sivalingam I. P. S	Tamil		
2008	Vidakandan Kodakandan	Tamil		
2008	Sangamithra	Tamil		
2009	Tholaindhu Ponavargal	Tamil		
2011	Muriyadi	Tamil		
2011	Pettai Mudhal Kottai Varai	Tamil		
2011	Kulasekaranum Koolippadayum	Tamil		
2011	Natpukottai	Tamil		
2011	Trigger	Malayalam		
2013	Show	Malayalam		
2018	Party	Tamil		
2023	Jackson Durai 2	Tamil	250th Film	

==== As narrator ====
- Kaakha Kaakha (2003)
- Santosh Subramaniam (2008)
- Mahabalipuram (2014)
- Walter (2020)
- Varunan (2025)

=== Television ===
==== Web series ====
List of web series acting credits
Year	Title	Role	Network	Language	Notes
2022	Meet Cute	Journalist Mohan Rao	SonyLiv	Telugu	Web Debut; Under Segment "Old is Gold"
2023	Mansion 24	Kalidas	Disney+ Hotstar	Telugu	
2024	My Perfect Husband	Bharathi	Disney+ Hotstar	Tamil	

== Other crew positions ==
=== As writer and director ===
Credits as writer and producer
Year	Title	Director	Writer	Notes
1985	Darja Donga		Story	Telugu film
1995	Villadhi Villain	Yes	Yes	

=== As producer ===
Credits as producer
Year	Title	Notes
2007	Lee	
2014	Naaigal Jaakirathai	
2017	Sathya	

== As singer ==
List of film singing credits
Year	Film	Song	Composer	Notes
2010	Guru Sishyan	"Subbaiyaa Subbaiyaa"	Dhina	Sang along with Sundar C
