= Osai =

- Directed by: K. Vijayan
- Written by: Aaroor Dass (dialogues)
- Story by: Manoj Kumar
- Produced by: Meera Balagopalan
- Starring: Mohan; Radhika
- Cinematography: Tiwari
- Edited by: D. Vasu
- Music by: Shankar–Ganesh
- Production company: Jayvee Movies
- Release date: 23 October 1984
- Country: India
- Language: Tamil

Osai (transl. Sound) is a 1984 Indian Tamil-language film, directed by K. Vijayan. The film stars Mohan and Radhika, with K. Balaji, Nalini, R. S. Manohar and Nizhalgal Ravi in supporting roles. It is a remake of the 1972 Hindi film Shor. The film was released on 23 October 1984.

== Cast ==
- Mohan as Raja
- Radhika as Rani
- Nalini as Radha
- R. S. Manohar
- Nizhalgal Ravi
- Thengai Srinivasan
- Manorama
- Bindu Ghosh
- Baby Shalini as Shalini
- Poornam Viswanathan
- Kallapetti Singaram
- Master Chittibabu
- Narasimhan
- Nalinikanth

== Production ==
Osai marked the film debut of Shalini, though she began filming for Pillai Nila before.

== Soundtrack ==
Soundtrack was composed by Shankar–Ganesh.

Track listing
No.	Title	Lyrics	Singer(s)	Length
1.	"Hari Om"	Vaali	Malaysia Vasudevan, Vani Jairam	5:03
2.	"Poove Poove"	Na. Kamarasan	S. Janaki	4:04
3.	"Silu Silunnu"	Vaali	S. Janaki	4:37
4.	"Allah Allah"	Vaali	K. J. Yesudas	4:24
5.	"Oru Paadal"	Pulamaipithan	S. P. Balasubrahmanyam, Vani Jairam	5:58
6.	"Vaazhkai Endru"	Pulamaipithan	S. P. Balasubrahmanyam, Vani Jairam	3:57
Total length:				28:03

== Reception ==
Jayamanmadhan of Kalki praised the acting of actors but panned Anuradha's dance and Mohan-Nalini's romance and concluded if we forget these negatives, this is not osai (sound), it is isai (music).
