= Manobala =

Indian film director, producer and actor (1953–2023)

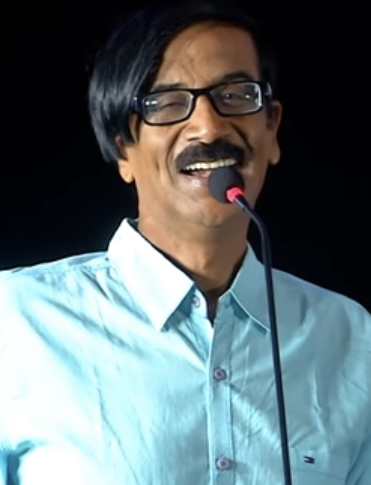
- Manobala in 2019
- Born: Balachandar; 8 December 1953; Marungoor, Thanjavur District (today's Nagapattinam District), Madras Presidency, India
- Died: 3 May 2023 (aged 69); Chennai, Tamil Nadu, India
- Occupations: Actor, director, producer
- Years active: 1979–2023
- Spouse: Usha Mahadevan
- Children: 1

Balachandar (8 December 1953 – 3 May 2023), known by his stage name Manobala (/mənoʊbɑːlɑː/), was an Indian actor, film producer, director, comedian, and YouTuber who predominantly played supporting roles in Tamil-language films. He worked predominantly in the film industry for nearly forty years and was notable for his unique body language, dialogue delivery and intonation.

== Early life ==
Manobala was born as Balachandar in a Marungoor village near Thirumarugal , Nagapattinam District, but did most of his primary education in Bangalore and Thirukattupalli for grades 10 and 11. He later studied at the Government College of Fine Arts, when he started writing articles under the pen name Manobala, and also learnt Bharatanatyam and the Veena.

== Career ==
Manobala started his career in Tamil cinema in the early 1970s and with a reference from Kamal Haasan became an assistant director for Bharathiraja's 1979 film Puthiya Vaarpugal. He continued to work as his assistant director for Niram Maaratha Pookkal (1979) and Tik Tik Tik (1981). He made his directorial debut with Agaya Gangai (1982) but it was a box office failure. His second film as director, Pillai Nila (1985) was more successful.

Manobala continued to direct with such films as Oorkavalan (1987), En Purushanthaan Enakku Mattumthaan (1989), and Dhoorathu Pachai (1987) which were critically acclaimed by the critics and were well received by audiences. He often collaborated with some of the leading actors of his generation, including Vijayakanth, Rajinikanth, Kamal Haasan, and Karthik. He made his Bollywood debut as director with Mera Pati Sirf Mera Hai (1990), and his television serial directorial debut with Panchavaranam. He had directed 24 films in his career, but he later focused his career as an actor in the 2000s when he began working full time as an actor.

Manobala appeared in over 976 films. He played minor roles in most of the films as he regularly shared screenspace with veteran comedians Vadivelu and Vivek. He was known for his comic roles in films including Ice, Nanban, Chandramukhi, Pithamagan, Tamizh Padam, Kavalai Vendam, Kalakalappu, Siruthai, Alex Pandian, Aranmanai, Aambala, and Yaaradi Nee Mohini. Manobala made his debut as film producer with H. Vinoth's directorial venture Sathuranga Vettai, for which he received the Best Debut Film Producer award at the South Indian International Movie Awards.

Manobala launched a YouTube channel named "Waste Paper", where he interviewed several directors and actors. In 2022, he received a doctorate degree from the South Western American University in recognition of his contributions to films. He also received the Lifetime Achievement Award by the Global Achievers Council. He featured as one of the contestants in the reality television show Cooku with Comali in 2022.

== Personal life ==
Manobala was married to Usha Mahadevan, and they have a son.

== Death ==
Manobala died at his residence in Chennai on 3 May 2023, reportedly due to liver issues, at age 69. Prior to this, he had also undergone an angio treatment in January 2023 after experiencing chest pain. He was a heavy smoker of cigarettes and was addicted to smoking during the peak of his career as a film director.

== Partial filmography ==
=== Director ===
==== Films ====
Year	Film	Notes
1982	Agaya Gangai	
1985	Pillai Nila	
1985	Naan Ungal Rasigan	
1986	Paaru Paaru Pattanam Paaru	
1986	December 31	Kannada film
1987	Sirai Paravai	
1987	Dhoorathu Pachai	
1987	Oorkavalan	
1988	Chutti Poonai	
1989	En Purushanthaan Enakku Mattumthaan	
1989	Moodu Manthiram	
1989	Thendral Sudum	
1990	Mera Pati Sirf Mera Hai	Hindi film; credited as M. M. Manobala
1990	Mallu Vetti Minor	
1991	Vetri Padigal	
1991	Moondrezhuthil En Moochirukkum	
1992	Senbaga Thottam	
1993	Mutrugai	
1993	Karuppu Vellai	
1993	Paarambariyam	
1997	Nandhini	
1999	Siragugal	Telefilm
2000	Annai	
2002	Naina	

==== Serials ====
Year	Series	Network
1999	Panchavarnam	Sun TV
2000	Punnagai	Sun TV
2009	777	Polimer TV

=== As an actor ===
==== Tamil films ====
Year	Film	Role	Notes
1979	Puthiya Vaarpugal	Panchayat Member	Also assistant director
1979	Niram Maaratha Pookkal	Unknown	Also assistant director
1980	Kallukkul Eeram	Shooting assistant	Uncredited role; also assistant director
1981	Tik Tik Tik	Unknown	Uncredited role; also assistant director
1982	Gopurangal Saivathillai	Pathani Bhai	
1994	Rasa Magan	Broker	
1994	Thozhar Pandian		
1994	Thai Maaman		Guest appearance
1995	Gangai Karai Paattu	Pawn shop owner	
1995	Rani Maharani		
1997	Nesam	Telephone booth owner	
1997	Nandhini		
1997	Pagaivan	Govindhan	
1997	Ratchagan	Kanniyappan	
1998	Swarnamukhi	Translator	
1998	Natpukkaga	Madurai	
1998	Kalyana Galatta		
1998	Thalaimurai		
1999	Chinna Raja		
1999	Anantha Poongatre	Poongavanam	
1999	Minsara Kanna	Vedhachalam's henchman	
1999	Taj Mahal		
1999	Sethu	Tamil Teacher	
2000	Annai	Moses	
2000	James Pandu	Railway porter	
2001	Nila Kaalam		
2001	Samudhiram	Professor	
2002	Villain	Minister's brother-in-law	
2003	Banda Paramasivam	Police Inspector	
2003	Indru Mudhal	Doctor	
2003	Nala Damayanthi	Passport Officer	
2003	Jayam	Kamalesh	
2003	Whistle	College professor	
2003	Ice	Director	
2003	Kaakha Kaakha	Ramana	Uncredited
2003	Diwan		
2003	Boys	Ajay	
2003	Three Roses		
2003	Pithamagan	Sakthi's uncle	
2003	Jay Jay	Jamuna's family friend	
2003	Anbe Un Vasam	Professor	
2003	Kadhal Kirukkan	Doctor	
2003	Soori	Container passenger	
2004	Aethirree	Seshagopalan	
2004	Campus	Nallathambi	
2004	Arul	Customer	
2004	Perazhagan	Nair	
2004	M. Kumaran Son of Mahalakshmi	Ganesh's father	
2004	Bose		
2004	Attahasam	Semi Joseph	
2004	Dreams	Moosa	
2004	Maha Nadigan		
2005	Aayudham		
2005	Ji	Train passenger	
2005	Kodambakkam		
2005	Thaka Thimi Tha	Bala	
2005	Chandramukhi	Fake Exorcist	
2005	Priyasakhi	Babloo	
2005	6'2	Krishnamurthy's father	
2005	Anniyan	Raja	
2005	Ghajini	Ad Director	
2005	Sorry Enaku Kalyanamayidichu		
2006	Thambi		
2006	Unarchigal	Manager	
2006	Thirupathi	Police inspector	
2006	Thalai Nagaram	Police inspector	
2006	Parijatham		
2006	Naalai		
2006	Kusthi		
2006	Imsai Arasan 23rd Pulikecei	Kollan	
2006	Ilavattam		partially reshot version
2006	Dharmapuri	Silandhi Karuppu's henchman	
2006	Varalaru	Police Constable	
2006	Vathiyar	Ayyanar's father	
2007	Deepavali	Villager	
2007	Muruga		
2007	Koodal Nagar	Doctor	
2007	Parattai Engira Azhagu Sundaram		
2007	Madurai Veeran	Shiva's grandfather	
2007	Nee Naan Nila	Professor	
2007	Thullal	Building secretary	
2007	Kireedam	Constable	
2007	Malaikottai	Bhaskar's aide	
2007	Pasupathi c/o Rasakkapalayam	Constable Naidu	
2007	Azhagiya Thamizh Magan	TTR	
2007	Kannamoochi Yenada	Senthilkannu	
2007	Polladhavan		
2008	Pirivom Santhippom	Natesan's manager	
2008	Sila Nerangalil		
2008	Vambu Sandai		
2008	Maanavan Ninaithal	Professor	
2008	Vaitheeswaran	Dhanasekaran's Henchman	
2008	Yaaradi Nee Mohini	Balu	
2008	Santhosh Subramaniam	Loan Officer	
2008	Arai En 305-il Kadavul	Vengi Raja	
2008	Madurai Ponnu Chennai Paiyan	Bala Nair	
2008	Sutta Pazham	Assistant commissioner	
2008	Kuselan	Sub-Inspector	
2008	Unnai Naan	Vijay's father	
2008	Dhanam	Cop	
2008	Seval		
2008	Thenavattu		
2008	Silambaattam	Jaanu's father	
2008	Abhiyum Naanum	Vardarajan	
2008	Dindigul Sarathy	Photographer	
2008	Panchamirtham		
2009	Villu	Cyclist	Deleted scene
2009	TN 07 AL 4777	Police constable	
2009	Guru En Aalu	Traffic Inspector	
2009	Thoranai	Birth and Death administration officer	
2009	Maasilamani	Advocate	
2009	Sirithal Rasipen	Siddhu's father	
2009	Indira Vizha		
2009	Ninaithale Inikkum	Class Teacher	
2009	Aarumugam		
2009	Oru Kadhalan Oru Kadhali	Ramaiah	
2009	Aadhavan	Tara's uncle	
2009	Kanden Kadhalai	Mayilvahanam	
2009	Palaivana Solai		
2009	Vettaikkaaran	Reporter	
2010	Tamizh Padam	Siddharth	
2010	Thairiyam		
2010	Rettaisuzhi		
2010	Goripalayam		
2010	Kutti Pisasu		
2010	Singam	Mayil's lawyer	
2010	Pournami Nagam	Swamy	
2010	Indrasena		
2010	Thillalangadi	Priest	
2010	Baana Kaathadi	Conductor	
2010	Neeyum Naanum		
2010	Puzhal	Alex	
2010	Drohi	Raghu	
2010	Thottupaar		
2010	Chikku Bukku	Sekhar's cousin	
2010	Kalloori Kalangal	Professor	
2010	Agam Puram	C. Singamuthu	
2010	Siddhu +2		
2011	Madhuvum Mythiliyum	Madhu's father	
2011	Siruthai	Bhoom Bhoom	
2011	Payanam	Narayana Shastry	
2011	Thambikottai	Puli	
2011	Seedan	Sozhiyoor Somalingam	
2011	Bhavani	Ramakrishnan	
2011	Appavi	College Professor	
2011	Mappillai	Astrologer	
2011	Eththan	Bank Manager	
2011	Udhayan		
2011	Doo		
2011	Ramanathapuram		
2011	Konjam Veyil Konjam Mazhai		
2011	Mudhal Idam		
2011	Muni 2: Kanchana	Priest	
2011	Puli Vesham		
2011	Kasethan Kadavulada	Balram Naidu	
2011	Vandhaan Vendraan		
2011	Vellore Maavattam		
2011	Sadhurangam	Thiru's neighbour	
2011	Mambattiyaan	Annachchi's Accountant	
2011	Mahaan Kanakku	Traffic Police Officer	
2012	Vilayada Vaa	Kothandam	
2012	Nanban	Bose	
2012	Oru Nadigaiyin Vaakkumoolam		
2012	Kondaan Koduthaan		
2012	Sooriya Nagaram		
2012	Kalakalappu	Marudhamuthu	
2012	Idhayam Thiraiarangam		
2012	Saguni	Induratagaval	
2012	Meeravudan Krishna		
2012	Ajantha		
2012	Thuppakki	Nisha's father	
2012	Akilan	Raghavan	
2013	Kurumbukara Pasanga	Cop	
2013	Alex Pandian	Captain Divakaran	
2013	Puthagam	Kalyanasundaram aka Kallis	
2013	Sillunu Oru Sandhippu		
2013	Naangam Pirai		partially reshot version
2013	Onbadhule Guru	Bun Rotti Babu	
2013	Oru Mutham Oru Yutham	Finance Company Boss	partially reshot version
2013	Chennaiyil Oru Naal	Sathyamoorthy	
2013	Vetkathai Kettal Enna Tharuvaai		
2013	Settai	Gourishankar	
2013	Ethir Neechal	Gunasekara Raja	
2013	Masani	Priest	
2013	Theeya Velai Seiyyanum Kumaru	Pencil Mama / Cone Ice	
2013	Thillu Mullu	Sounderrajan	
2013	Thulli Vilayadu		
2013	Pattathu Yaanai		
2013	Sonna Puriyathu	Rajesh Kanna	
2013	Thalaivaa	Viswa's Follower	
2013	Ainthu Ainthu Ainthu	Yoga Instructor	
2013	Raja Rani	Air Voice CEO-Ramamoorthy	
2013	Naiyaandi	Astrologer	
2013	Vanakkam Chennai	Constable	
2013	Ragalaipuram	Inspector	
2013	Maayai		
2013	Naveena Saraswathi Sabatham	Naradhar	
2013	Kolagalam	Roadside stall owner	
2014	Ninaivil Nindraval		
2014	Virattu		
2014	Oru Kanniyum Moonu Kalavaanikalum	Chetan	
2014	Tenaliraman	Education Minister	
2014	Damaal Dumeel		
2014	Thalaivan		
2014	Yennamo Yedho	Guruji	
2014	Enna Satham Indha Neram	Kidnapper	
2014	Ramanujan	Krishna Rao	
2014	Anjaan	Director	
2014	Aindhaam Thalaimurai Sidha Vaidhiya Sigamani	Soori	
2014	Jamai	Sangili Murugan	
2014	Aranmanai	Eshwari's husband	
2014	Irumbu Kuthirai	Pizza Shop Manager	
2014	Poojai	Kovai Group's Secretary	
2014	Kalkandu	Principal Kamalnath	
2014	Jaihind 2	Nandhini's father	Uncredited role
2014	Velmurugan Borewells		
2014	Naaigal Jaakirathai	Pichumani	
2014	Lingaa	Train Driver	
2014	Vellaikaara Durai		
2015	Vettaiyadu		
2015	Aambala	Police Commissioner	
2015	Touring Talkies	Koteeswaran	Anthology film; segment Love @ 75
2015	Manitha Kadhal Alla		
2015	Tamizhuku En Ondrai Azhuthavum	Swaminathan	
2015	Kaaki Sattai	Jyothi Lingam	
2015	JK Enum Nanbanin Vaazhkai	Drawing artist	
2015	Ivanuku Thannila Gandam	Dr. Markandeyan	
2015	Sonna Pochu		
2015	Nannbenda	Senthamarai	
2015	Thunai Mudhalvar		
2015	Kanchana 2	Arnold	
2015	Vai Raja Vai	Mano	
2015	India Pakistan	Idichapuli	
2015	Vindhai	Nadhawara Koshti	
2015	Massu Engira Masilamani	Arnold	
2015	Soan Papdi		
2015	Palakkattu Madhavan	Madhavan's boss	
2015	Aavi Kumar		
2015	Idhu Enna Maayam		
2015	Kalai Vendhan		
2015	Savaale Samaali	Manobala	
2015	Maanga	Rengasamy Nagarajan	
2015	10 Endrathukulla	Road Transport Officer Manikandan	
2015	Urumeen	Soundappan	
2016	Karaioram	Inspector P. Muthu Raj	Uncredited role
2016	Peigal Jaakkirathai		
2016	Rajinimurugan	Kunjithapatham	
2016	Aranmanai 2	Komalam's brother	
2016	Kanithan	Anu's father	
2016	Pokkiri Raja	Raghav	
2016	Sowkarpettai	Mani	
2016	Mapla Singam		
2016	Thozha	Balavika Orphanage Home Warden	
2016	Theri	School principal	
2016	Unnodu Ka	Traffic police	
2016	Pandiyoda Galatta Thaangala		
2016	Vellikizhamai 13am Thethi	Doctor	
2016	Nayagi	Saradha's husband	
2016	Kadalai	Businessman	
2016	Kadavul Irukaan Kumaru	Pesuvadhellam Unmai show director	
2016	Kavalai Vendam	Pattai Babu	
2016	Virumandikkum Sivanandikkum		
2016	Parandhu Sella Vaa		
2016	Andaman		
2017	Motta Shiva Ketta Shiva	GK's sidekick	
2017	465		
2017	Vaigai Express	Kannitheevu Kaarmegam / Thavittaisaamy	
2017	Saravanan Irukka Bayamaen	Swamy	
2017	Thirappu Vizha		
2017	Adhagappattathu Magajanangalay		
2017	Sathura Adi 3500	Gauri Shankar	
2017	Katha Nayagan	Swamy	
2017	Hara Hara Mahadevaki	Bhakta	
2017	Theeran Adhigaaram Ondru	Priya's father	
2017	Laali		
2018	Kalakalappu 2	Ganesh's assistant	
2018	Solli Vidava	Apartment president	
2018	Nagesh Thiraiyarangam	Priya's father	
2018	Kaathadi		
2018	Merlin		
2018	Abhiyum Anuvum	Abhi's boss	
2018	Traffic Ramasamy	Judge	
2018	Kaathiruppor Pattiyal	Kunjitha Padham	
2018	Semma Botha Aagathey	Devi's father	
2018	Inba Twinkle Lilly	China	
2018	Kadaikutty Singam	Judge	
2018	Tamizh Padam 2	Siddharth	
2018	Ghajinikanth	Kamal Vishwanathan	
2018	Marainthirunthu Paarkum Marmam Enna		
2018	Seema Raja	Headmaster	
2018	Koothan	Film Director	
2018	Kalavani Mappillai		
2018	Kaatrin Mozhi	Murthy	
2018	Utharavu Maharaja		
2018	Sei	Film director	
2018	Thulam		
2019	Maanik		
2019	LKG	Mukesh	
2019	Thirumanam	Narasimhachari	
2019	Kee	College Professor	
2019	Gurkha	Kavariman	
2019	Jackpot	Rice Mill Rayyappan	
2019	Zombie	Chinna Thambi's father-in-law	
2019	En Kaadhali Scene Podura		
2019	Ongala Podanum Sir	Chairman Kasthuriman	
2019	Aruvam	School Head Master	
2019	Bigil	Professor	
2019	50 Roova	Police officer	
2020	Ayya Ullen Ayya		
2020	Pachai Vilakku	Professor	
2020	Dagaalty	Film director	
2020	College Kumar	K. Murthy	
2020	Asuraguru	Shakthi's boss	
2021	Naanum Single Thaan	Udhay's father	
2021	Chakra	Gayathri's uncle	
2021	Engada Iruthinga Ivvalavu Naala	Ganesan	
2021	Rudra Thandavam	Pastor	
2021	Aranmanai 3	Pencil	
2021	Maaligai	Power Paandi	Unreleased (Note: Dubbed in Hindi (2021))
2021	Raajavamsam	Odduvathi Sekar	
2021	Operation Jujupi	God	
2021	Murungakkai Chips	Lingusamy	
2022	Naai Sekar	Gopi	
2022	Yutha Satham	Nagulan's boss	
2022	Ranga		
2022	Oh My Dog	Police inspector	
2022	Kadhal Sei		Unreleased (Note: Dubbed in Kannada as Preethsu (2022))
2022	Koogle Kuttappa	Doctor	
2022	Don	School Teacher	
2022	Naai Sekar Returns	Naamakatti Narayanan	
2022	Ranga		
2022	Padaippalan		
2022	Super Senior Heroes	Mohan	
2022	Radha Krishna		
2022	Dha Dha		
2022	Gurumoorthi	Bheeman	
2022	Mofussil	Police officer	
2023	Kondraal Paavam	Swamiji	
2023	Ghosty	Priest	
2023	Tamilarasan	Adhimoolam	
2023	Theera Kaadhal	Newlywed	Posthumous films
2023	Kasethan Kadavulada	Sundaram	Posthumous films
2023	Kabadi Bro		Posthumous films
2023	Rayar Parambarai		Posthumous films
2023	Saandrithazh		Posthumous films
2023	Kick	Shivani's boss	Posthumous films
2023	Irugapatru	Arjun's boss	Posthumous films
2023	Chandramukhi 2	Fake exorcist	Posthumous films
2023	Dhillu Irundha Poradu		Posthumous films
2023	80s Buildup	Parameshwaran "Paramu"	Posthumous films
2023	Kadhal Conditions Apply		Unreleased film
2024	Tha Naa		Posthumous films
2024	Chiclets	Pharmacist	Posthumous films
2024	E-mail	Kailasam	Posthumous films
2024	Operation Laila		Posthumous films
2024	Ninaivellam Neeyada		Posthumous films
2024	Inga Naan Thaan Kingu	Broker	Posthumous films
2024	Haraa	Professor	Posthumous films
2024	Udhir @ Poomara Kathu		Posthumous films
2024	Indian 2	Nanjunda Moorthy	Posthumous films
2024	Andhagan	Police Officer Bala	Posthumous films
2024	Viduthalai Part 2	Station master	Posthumous films
2025	Madha Gaja Raja	Minister Nallamuthu	Posthumous films
2025	Enai Sudum Pani	Subramani	Posthumous films
2025	Thanthra		Posthumous films
2026	Valluvan	Police constable	Posthumous films
2026	Singgaramm		Posthumous films

==== Telugu films ====
Year	Film	Role
2008	Kathanayakudu	Sub-Inspector
2009	Punnami Naagu	SI Velangara Ramana Reddy
2011	Gaganam	Narayana Shastry
2014	Manasunu Maaya Seyake	Sundaram
2016	Oopiri	Balavikasa Orphanage Home Warden
2016	Nayaki	Saradha's husband
2018	Mahanati	P. Pullaiah
2018	Devadas	Tata Rao
2019	Rajdooth	Lender
2020	College Kumar	K. Murthy
2023	Waltair Veerayya	Judge

==== Malayalam films ====
Year	Film	Role
2017	Jomonte Suvisheshangal	Perumal
2018	B.Tech	Mano
2022	Viddikalude Mash	

=== Television ===
Year	Series	Role	Network	Note
2005–2006	Alli Rajjiyam	Namachivayam	Sun TV	
2017	Smart Wheel	Guest	Astro Vinmeen HD	
2018	Maya	Bhadra	Sun TV	
2020–2021	Sembaruthi	Perumal	Zee Tamizh	
2021	Rajaparvai	Himself	Sun TV	
2022	Cooku with Comali (season 3)	Cook	Star Vijay	Eliminated on Episode 14
2024	Sshhh		Aha Tamil	

=== As producer ===
Year	Film	Notes
2014	Sathuranga Vettai	SIIMA Award for Best Debut Producer
2017	Paambhu Sattai	

=== As dubbing artist ===
Year	Film	Role	Notes
2002	Naina	Voice from heaven	
2019	The Lion King	Zazu (John Oliver)	Tamil version
