= December Pookkal =

- Title card
- Directed by: R. Bhoopathy
- Written by: R. Bhoopathy
- Produced by: K. Nagarajan
- Starring: Mohan; Revathi; Nalini; Nizhalgal Ravi
- Cinematography: Raja Rajan
- Edited by: N. R. Kittu (Supervisor); Ramesh–Mohan
- Music by: Ilaiyaraaja
- Production company: Shri N. R. K. Cine Arts
- Release date: 14 January 1986
- Country: India
- Language: Tamil

December Pookkal (transl. December flowers) is a 1986 Indian Tamil-language slasher film written and directed by R. Bhoopathy. The film stars Mohan, Revathi, Nalini and Nizhalgal Ravi, with Goundamani and Senthil in comical roles. It was released on 14 January 1986.

== Plot ==
Chandru loses his wife in an accident, then goes on a killing spree, murdering all those women who refused to donate blood to his wife when she was hospitalised. Poornima, Chandru's new girlfriend, confronts him about his state of mind, but instead of getting him help, she tells him that she feels privileged to be killed by him. The police arrive on time to shoot Chandru in the back.

== Cast ==
- Mohan as Chandru
- Revathi as Annam Poornima
- Nalini as Uma
- Nizhalgal Ravi as Inspector Vinoth
- Goundamani as Mestri Mayilsamy
- Senthil as Senthil Kumaran
- Sivachandran
- Ilavarasan
- V. Gopalakrishnan as Gopinath Poornima's father
- Delhi Ganesh as JR.Seshadri
- Chinni Jayanth as Chandru's Assistant
- Y. Vijaya as Manonmani
- Kuyili as Sarasu
- Kumarimuthu as Police constable
- Omakuchi Narasimhan
- Master Haja Sheriff
- MLA Thangaraj

== Soundtrack ==
The music was composed by Ilaiyaraaja. The song "Azhagaka Sirithathu" attained popularity.

| Song | Singers | Lyrics | Length |
|---|---|---|---|
| "Azhagaka Sirithathu" | P. Jayachandran, S. Janaki | Vaali | 04:44 |
| "Intha Vennila" | K. S. Chithra | Muthulingam | 04:31 |
| "Maalaigal Idam" | K. J. Yesudas, K. S. Chithra | Gangai Amaran | 04:41 |
| "Nooraandu Kaalam" | K. S. Chithra | Vaali | 02:39 |
| "Sambonu" | S. Janaki | Gangai Amaran | 04:34 |

== Reception ==
Kalki said the cinematography by Raja Rajan was the film's only high point.
