= Anjatha Singam =

1987 film

- Poster
- Directed by: M. Vijaychander
- Written by: M. Vijaychander
- Produced by: Mrs. S.Revathi
- Starring: Prabhu; Sathyaraj; Jaishankar; M. N. Nambiar; Nalini; Goundamani
- Cinematography: Padmanabhan
- Edited by: T. K. Rajan
- Music by: Shankar–Ganesh
- Production company: Karthik Arts
- Release date: 21 August 1987
- Running time: 110 minutes
- Country: India
- Language: Tamil

Anjatha Singam (transl. Fearless Lion) is a 1987 Indian Tamil-language film directed by M. Vijaychander and produced by Karthik Arts. The film stars Prabhu, Sathyaraj, M. N. Nambiar, Nalini and Goundamani. It was released on 20 November 1987.

== Cast ==
- Prabhu as Raja
- Jaishankar as Inspector Rajasekhar
- M. N. Nambiar as Max
- Nalini as Rani
- Silk Smitha
- Anuradha
- Vanitha
- Sathyaraj in a Guest appearance role
- Vadivukkarasi
- Senthil
- Kullamani
- Idichapuli Selvaraj
- MLA Thangaraj

== Soundtrack ==
Soundtrack was composed by Shankar–Ganesh.

- "Thamaraiyai Vaazhthi" – Malaysia Vasudevan, Vani Jairam
- "Muzhanguthu Guitar" – Malaysia Vasudevan, S. P. Sailaja
