= Naan Ungal Rasigan =

- Poster
- Directed by: Manobala
- Written by: M. S. Madhu (dialogues)
- Screenplay by: Manobala
- Story by: Manobala
- Produced by: Stills Ravi
- Starring: Mohan; Radhika; Rajeev; Nalini
- Cinematography: K. Rajpreeth
- Edited by: Gowthaman
- Music by: Gangai Amaran
- Production company: Chaya Puthra Films
- Release date: 11 October 1985
- Country: India
- Language: Tamil

Naan Ungal Rasigan (transl. I am your fan) is a 1985 Indian Tamil-language psychological thriller film directed and co-written by Manobala. The film stars Mohan, Radhika, Rajeev and Nalini, with Senthamarai and Vennira Aadai Moorthy in supporting roles. It revolves around a villager who lusts for an actress, and persistently stalks her. The film was released on 11 October 1985 and failed at the box office.

== Plot ==
Subramani, a villager, is an obsessive fan of Ranjani, an actress based in Madras. When the village elder speaks ill of Ranjani, Subramani murders him. Subramani moves to Madras, and after persistently stalking Ranjani without her knowledge, he eventually becomes her driver. Ranjani eventually becomes aware of Subramani's lust for her and rebuffs him. Later when Subramani enters Ranjani's room, he finds her slain corpse. He is startled, and while trying to hide her corpse, he accidentally kills a visiting press photographer, and intentionally murders Ranjani's manager when he sees the corpse. When Ranjani's younger sister Vidya and her daughter arrive, Subramani hides. Afterwards he hides Ranjani's corpse in the trunk of a car but Vidya finds it. She later tells her husband, a police inspector, that Subramani is behind the murders of Ranjani, her manager and the photographer. Subramani holds the couple's daughter hostage, but is outsmarted by the couple. He fights the inspector but is defeated, and dies near Ranjani's corpse.

== Cast ==
- Mohan as Subramani
- Radhika as Ranjani
- Rajeev as the police inspector
- Nalini as Vidya
- Senthamarai as the village elder
- Gandhimathi
- Vennira Aadai Moorthy as Ranjani's manager
- Kumarimuthu
- Disco Shanti
- Ennathe Kannaiah
- Oru Viral Krishna Rao

== Production ==
Stills Ravi, a still photographer, agreed to produce the film because of his friendship with Manobala and admiration for Mohan. The latter charged no fee for acting in the film. Mohan's voice was dubbed by Ratnakumar, instead of his usual dubbing artist S. N. Surendar. The dialogues were written by M. S. Madhu, cinematography was handled by K. Rajpreeth and editing by Gowthaman. The film was launched at Prasad Studios along with song recording.

== Soundtrack ==
The music was composed by Gangai Amaran.

Track listing
No.	Title	Lyrics	Singer(s)	Length
1.	"Poove Ilam Poove"	Muthulingam	S. Janaki
2.	"Oru Devathai"	Mu. Metha	S. P. Balasubrahmanyam, P. Susheela
3.	"Poovula Maalai"	Gangai Amaran	Malaysia Vasudevan, S. P. Sailaja

== Release and reception ==
Naan Ungal Rasigan was released on 11 October 1985. Jayamanmadhan of Kalki praised the performance of Mohan but found his characterisation confusing while also praising Radhika and Nalini's performance and certain scenes for providing thrills and concluded maybe Manobala is more used to horror scenes than emotional scenes however when the cards keep stacking up like a house of cards, even the horror will become tasteless which something he should understand while making his next film. Anna gave a negative review criticising the music, dialogues and direction and noted the film is lousy from start to end and should be awarded the lousiest film of the year. The film failed at the box office.
