= Naalai Unathu Naal =

- Title card
- Directed by: A. Jagannathan
- Screenplay by: A. Jagannathan
- Story by: Prithvi Brothers
- Produced by: C. Kalavathi; K. Revathi
- Starring: Vijayakanth; Nalini; Jaishankar
- Cinematography: P. Ganesapandiyan
- Edited by: R. Devarajan
- Music by: Ilaiyaraaja
- Production company: Vaasan Productions
- Release date: 7 September 1984
- Running time: 132 minutes
- Country: India
- Language: Tamil

Naalai Unathu Naal (transl. Tomorrow is your day) is a 1984 Indian Tamil-language mystery thriller film, written and directed by A. Jagannathan. The film stars Vijayakanth, Nalini and Jaishankar. It is a remake of the Hindi film Gumnaam (1965), itself heavily inspired by Agatha Christie's novel And Then There Were None (1939). The film is about a group of people being murdered one by one while on a free vacation. It was released on 7 September 1984, and performed averagely at the box office.

== Plot ==
Seven people mysteriously win a free vacation. On the way to their destination, the plane has engine trouble and they are left abandoned in a remote seaside location. They find shelter in a large mansion inhabited by a comical butler Angalamma. One by one, they are murdered and the remaining vacationers try to figure out why they were chosen for the trip and what they have in common.

== Cast ==
- Vijayakanth as Arun
- Nalini as Kalpana
- Jaishankar as Devadas
- Senthamarai as Dr. Nagaraj
- Sivachandran as Vivekananthan (Prakash)
- Goundamani as Varadhan
- Sathyaraj as David
- V. Gopalakrishnan as Dharmaraj
- S. V. Ramadas as Ramanathan
- Manorama as Angalamma
- Agalya as Rekha
- Anuradha in an item number

== Production ==
Ravi, Vijayakanth's stunt double, died during production, and the film was dedicated to him.

== Soundtrack ==
The music was composed by Ilaiyaraaja.

Song	Singers	Lyrics	Length
"Vennila Oduthu"	K. J. Yesudas, Vani Jairam	Na. Kamarasan	04:42
"Koodu Thedi"	S. Janaki	Vairamuthu	04:43
"Alai Alaiyaai"	Uma Ramanan, K. J. Yesudas	Vaali	04:15
"Seetu Kulunguthu"	Vani Jairam	Gangai Amaran	04:38
"Nalla Naal"	S. P. Sailaja	Avinasi Mani	04:20

== Reception ==
Jayamanmadhan of Kalki praised the performance of Manorama, the songs of Ilaiyaraaja but was critical of his re-recording; he felt the reveal of the murderer was lack of spice. The film did average business at the box office.
