= Mohan (actor) =

Indian actor

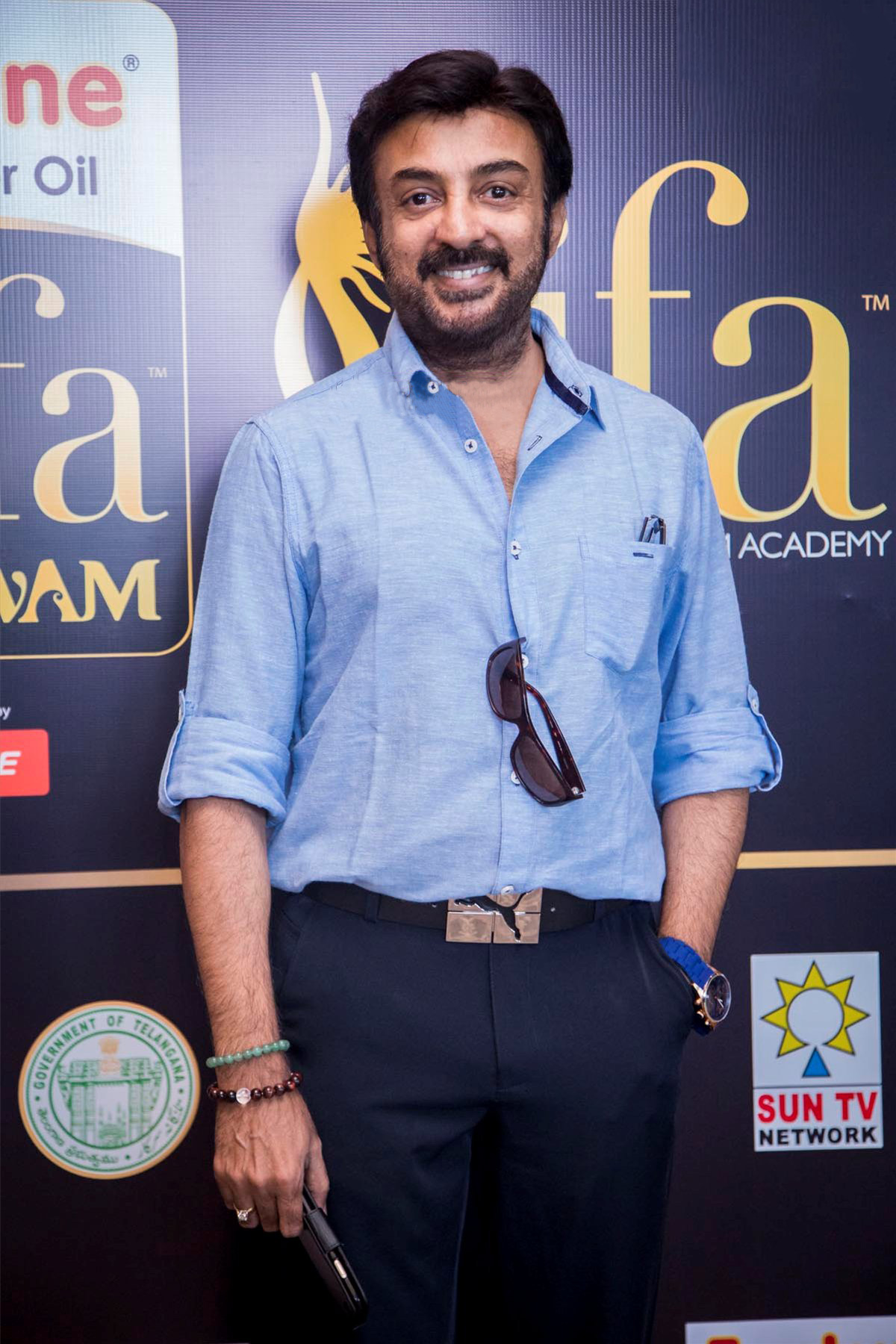
- Born: Mohan Rao; 10 May 1956 (age 70); Bengaluru, Mysuru State (now Karnataka), India
- Other names: Kokila Mohan; Mic Mohan; Silver Jubilee Star
- Occupations: Actor, Film producer
- Years active: 1977–1999; 2008–2009; 2016; 2023–present
- Spouse: Gowri
- Children: 1

Mohan (born 10 May 1956), is an Indian actor, known for his works predominantly in Tamil cinema. Besides Tamil films, he has also acted in some Telugu, Kannada and Malayalam films. Mohan is also known as "Kokila Mohan" after his debut film Kokila (1977), and "Mic Mohan" from numerous roles playing singers using microphones. In 1982, he received the Filmfare Award for Best Tamil Actor for his work in Payanangal Mudivathillai. One of the most successful Tamil film stars of the 1980s, he faced career setbacks in the 1990s and his film appearances have been intermittent since.

== Career ==
After Kannada movie Kokila, Mohan starred in a Malayalam movie titled Madalasa (1978). Furthermore, immediately after the success of the Malayalam movie, Mohan went on to sign a Telugu film by Bapu titled Thoorpu Velle Railu (1979), which was a remake of the Tamil film Kizhakke Pogum Rail. Then, he featured in Moodu Pani (1980), which is based on psychology. It made a good collection in the box-office of Tamil industry. Mohan attained the status of a Silver Jubilee Star. He was recognized as the Rajendra Kumar of Tamil cinema during the 1980s after his success.

After that Mohan was introduced in the Tamil film Nenjathai Killathe (1980) by director Mahendran. The film ran for a year and won the National Film Award for Best Feature Film in Tamil. After his films began to be either silver jubilee or over 200 days most of the time. He became a star in Payanangal Mudivathillai (1982) winning the Filmfare Award for Best Actor – Tamil.

He donned one of his best performances in the critically acclaimed Tamil romantic drama film, Mouna Ragam (1986) directed by Mani Ratnam.

He tried hard to stage a comeback by producing, directing besides playing the lead role in a movie titled Anbulla Kadhalukku (1999). Unfortunately, his bad luck continued and the movie disappeared from the box office without any trace. Mohan stated that when not acting, he is busy producing television serials like Acham Madam Nanam, Selvangal, Hasiyaramayana and Brindavanam.

He declined to do the role of Jayam Ravi's father in Unakkum Enakkum (2006), which was later played by K. Bhagyaraj. Mohan again played the hero after a hiatus of 9 years in Sutta Pazham released in 2008. The film was a low budget fare which helped the producer and distributors enjoy the profit. Mohan also done Ashokavana (2017), a Kannada film as hero, but the film remain unreleased.

Mohan's Civic Cinema has already produced Thalappavu (2008), the Prithviraj-Lal starrer, the debut directorial venture of popular actor Madhupal. Mohan made a comeback to Tamil cinema after 13 years with Haraa, an action drama (2024) and later appeared along with Vijay in The Greatest of All Time (2024) and received praises for his acting as the main antagonist.

== Personal life ==
Mohan married Gowri in 1987, and they have a son.

== Filmography ==
=== Tamil films ===
Key
†	Denotes films that have not yet been released

List of Mohan Tamil-language film credits
Year	Title	Role	Notes
1980	Moodu Pani	Bhaskar	
1980	Nenjathai Killathe	Ram	
1981	Panchami		
1981	Kilinjalgal	Babu	
1982	Payanangal Mudivathillai	Ravi Kumar	Won–Filmfare Award for Best Actor – Tamil
1982	Thambathyam Oru Sangeetham	Ramesh	
1982	Kaatrukkenna Veli	Raja	
1982	Theeradha Vilaiyattu Pillai	Kannan / Sekhar	Dual Role
1982	Lottery Ticket	Vasu	
1982	Iniyavale Vaa	Prabhu	
1982	Archanai Pookal	Karthik	
1982	Gopurangal Saivathillai	Murali	
1982	Chinnan Chirusugal	Mohan	
1983	Jothi	Vijayakumar	
1983	Thoongatha Kannindru Ondru	Ravi	
1983	Antha Sila Naatkal	Gopi	
1983	Nenjamellam Neeye	Mohan	
1983	Ilamai Kaalangal	Raghu	
1983	Saranalayam	Prabhu	
1983	Manaivi Solle Manthiram	Thyagu	
1983	Naalu Perukku Nandri	Babu	
1984	Kuva Kuva Vaathugal	Mohan	Guest Appearance
1984	Vidhi	Raja	
1984	Nooravathu Naal	Ramkumar	Nominated–Filmfare Award for Best Actor – Tamil
1984	Vengaiyin Mainthan	Radha's husband	
1984	Naan Paadum Paadal	Anand	
1984	Nalam Nalamariya Aaval	Krishna	
1984	Nenjathai Allitha	Venghu	
1984	Anbe Odi Vaa	Mahesh	
1984	Sattathai Thiruthungal	Chiranjeevi	
1984	Shanthi Muhurtham	Raja	
1984	24 Mani Neram	Raj	
1984	Magudi	Amavasai	
1984	Rusi	Ravi	
1984	Niraparaadhi	Inspector Raja	Guest Appearance
1984	Oh Maane Maane	Mahesh	
1984	Osai	Raja	
1984	Unnai Naan Santhithen	Vijay	Guest Appearance
1984	Vai Pandal	Dhivakar	
1984	Ambigai Neril Vanthaal	Ravi	
1985	Maappillai Singam	Dancer	Guest Appearance
1985	Udaya Geetham	Arun	
1985	Deivapiravi	Raja	
1985	Pillai Nila	Mohan	
1985	Anbin Mugavari	Balu	
1985	Thendrale Ennai Thodu	Raghunath	
1985	Anni	Raja	
1985	Kunguma Chimil	Ravi	
1985	Sri Raghavendrar	Disciple	Guest Appearance
1985	Unakkaga Oru Roja	Balu	
1985	Idaya Kovil	Shankar	Nominated–Filmfare Award for Best Actor – Tamil
1985	Naan Ungal Rasigan	Subramani	
1986	December Pookal	Chandru	
1986	Uyire Unakkaga	Balumurali	
1986	Aayiram Pookkal Malarattum	Arun	
1986	Mouna Ragam	Chandrakumar	Nominated–Filmfare Award for Best Actor – Tamil
1986	Mella Thirandhathu Kadhavu	Subramani	
1986	Paaru Paaru Pattanam Paaru	Mohanraj	
1986	Unnai Ondru Ketpen		
1987	Rettai Vaal Kuruvi	Gopi	Nominated–Filmfare Award for Best Actor – Tamil
1987	Ananda Aradhanai	Mohan	
1987	Idhu Oru Thodar Kathai	Ravi	
1987	Paadu Nilave	Balakrishnan	
1987	Ninaikka Therintha Maname	Babu	
1987	Krishnan Vandhaan	Raja	
1987	Theertha Karaiyinile	Ganesan (Raja)	
1988	Kunguma Kodu	Ramu	
1988	Paasa Paravaigal	Dr. Shankar	
1988	Mappillai Sir	Driving Master	
1988	Sahadevan Mahadevan	Sahadevan	
1988	Vasanthi	Raja	
1989	Naalaiya Manithan	Host	Guest Appearance
1989	Sondham 16	Varudhu	
1989	Oru Ponnu Nenacha		
1989	Thalaivanukkor Thalaivi	Siva	
1989	Manidhan Marivittan	Viswanathan & Uthaman	Dual Role
1989	Idhaya Dheepam	Madhan	
1989	Paasa Mazhai	Ashok	
1990	Valiba Vilayattu	Raja	
1990	Jagathalaprathapan	Prathap	
1991	Uruvam	Mohan	
1999	Anbulla Kadhalukku	Prem	Directorial debut
2008	Sutta Pazham	Nandakumar (Nandu)	
2024	Haraa	Ram / Dawood Ibrahim	
2024	The Greatest of All Time	Rajiv Menon	

=== Other language films ===
List of Mohan other language film credits
Year	Title	Role	Language	Notes
1977	Kokila	Heggadadevanakote Murali Manohar Rao Bhaskar Rao	Kannada	
1978	Aparichita	Shamu	Kannada	
1978	Madaalasa	Chandru	Malayalam	
1979	Toorpu Velle Railu	Ramakoti	Telugu	
1979	Bhoolokadalli Yamaraja	Suresh	Kannada	
1980	Nammammana Sose	Nataraj	Kannada	
1980	Gandharagolam	Madhan	Telugu	
1981	Gaali Maathu	Chintamani	Kannada	
1981	Patalam Pandu	Chandru	Telugu	
1981	Muniyana Madari	Maara	Kannada	
1981	Hennina Sedu	Nagendru	Kannada	
1982	Ponmudy	Raju	Malayalam	
1982	Njan Onnu Parayatte	Madhavankutty	Malayalam	
1982	Anantha Ragaalu	Mohan	Telugu	
1983	Haavada Hoovu	Mohan	Kannada	
1985	Sravanthi	Chiranjeevi	Telugu	
1986	Aalapana	Sivudu	Telugu	
1988	Aathma Katha	Ravi	Telugu	
1988	Choopulu Kalasina Subhavela	Anand Mohan	Telugu	
1989	Police Report	Srinivas	Telugu	
1990	Saradamba	Srikanth	Telugu	
2009	Ghauttham	Raghuram	Kannada	
2016	Abbayitho Ammayi	Abhi's father	Telugu	
2017	Ashokavana		Kannada	Unreleased

=== Television ===
Year	Name of Television Show	Role	Network
2024	Super Singer Season 10	Guest	Star Vijay

As producer

- Acham Madam Nanam
- Selvangal
- Hasiyaramayana
- Brindavanam
- Thalappavu
