= Karimedu Karuvayan =

- Title card
- Directed by: Rama Narayanan
- Written by: Gokula Krishnan
- Produced by: Kalyani Murugan
- Starring: Vijayakanth; Nalini; Pandiyan; Aruna
- Cinematography: N. K. Viswanathan
- Edited by: Gowthaman
- Music by: Ilaiyaraaja
- Production company: Meenakshi Arts
- Release date: 14 January 1986
- Country: India
- Language: Tamil

Karimedu Karuvayan is a 1986 Indian Tamil-language vigilante action film directed by Rama Narayanan and written by Gokula Krishnan. The film stars Vijayakanth, Nalini, Pandiyan and Aruna. It was released on 14 January 1986, and became an average success.

== Plot ==
A man named Karuvayan takes revenge on five people who killed his sister. He kills four as per his plan but gets caught by the police and is punished by the court with a death penalty. Shortly before his execution he escapes from prison and kills the last person. While fleeing from the village he is shot by the police and dies. His love interest Kaliammal also dies due to shock.

== Cast ==
- Vijayakanth as Karuvayan
- Nalini as Kaaliammal
- Pandiyan
- Aruna
- Radha Ravi
- Y. Vijaya
- Goundamani
- M. N. Nambiar
- Senthamarai
- P. S. Veerappa
- Vinu Chakravarthy
- Senthil
- S. S. Chandran
- Sangili Murugan
- Master Ganesh
- Pasi Sathya
- Sathyaraj in Guest role

== Production ==
After the success of Malaiyoor Mambattiyan (1983), Tamil cinema started making numerous films based on outlaws, with Karimedu Karuvayan being one such. It was based on the life history of bandit of same name who lived in Nagamalai and was encountered. The film was launched at Prasad Studios and the song "Karuvayan Kadhai Kelu" was recorded on the same day. The song "Kaatukulle Kadhal" was shot at Mettupalayam.

== Soundtrack ==
The music was composed by Ilaiyaraaja.

Track listing
No.	Title	Lyrics	Singer(s)	Length
1.	"Aha Silukku Thavani"	Muthulingam	K. S. Chithra, Krishnachandran	4:42
2.	"Katha Kelu"	Vairamuthu	Ilaiyaraaja	3:50
3.	"Kattukulla Kadhal Kiliye"	Vairamuthu	S. Janaki	4:29
4.	"Thakkali Pazhampola"	Thiruppathooran	Malaysia Vasudevan	4:27
5.	"Ulagam Suthuthada"	Vaali	Malaysia Vasudevan, Gangai Amaran	4:53
6.	"Othaiyilla Kanni Ponnu"	Gangai Amaran	Vani Jairam	4:39
Total length:				27:00

== Critical reception ==
Jayamanmadhan of Kalki said everyone in the film did well while also appreciating certain scenes and characters.
