= Eetti (1985 film) =

1985 Indian film by Rajasekhar

- Poster
- Directed by: Rajasekhar
- Screenplay by: Rajasekhar
- Story by: Shanmugapriyan
- Produced by: Thiruppur Mani
- Starring: Vijayakanth; Vishnuvardhan; Nalini; Viji; Sathyaraj
- Cinematography: V. Ranga
- Edited by: R. Vittal; C. Lancy
- Music by: Ilaiyaraaja
- Production company: Vivekananda Pictures
- Release date: 30 August 1985
- Running time: 137 minutes
- Country: India
- Language: Tamil

Eetti (transl. Spear) is a 1985 Indian Tamil-language action film directed by Rajasekhar. The film stars Vijayakanth, Vishnuvardhan and Nalini. It was released on 30 August 1985.

== Plot ==
Velan, a tribal hunter, lives in a forest, and highlights his tragic love story with Valli. Police inspector Prasad battles bravely to capture a criminal gang that is responsible for making adulterated medicines that cause the death of many children, but he is instructed by corrupt politicians to set them free without any punishment. Vexed with the rampant corruption in the Indian system, Prasad goes to his girlfriend Lalitha's house, and learns about Velan and Valli from the forests of Thaalla Malai. Velan is a talented hunter. The touching narration follows the love story of Velan and Valli, delving into the culture and tradition of the tribal communities living in the forests and the challenges they face in a rapidly changing society. Then, in a tragic incident, Valli is raped by the arrogant son Sathyam of a wealthy estate owner and his friends, causing her to commit suicide. Following Valli's final wish Velan makes it his life's mission to murder the three men responsible for her death. Will Velan succeed in his task? Will Inspector Prasad succeed in capturing Velan before he is able to complete his mission? Will the rapists be brought to justice? How will Velan's future unfold?

== Cast ==
- Vijayakanth as Velan
- Vishnuvardhan as Inspector Prasad
- Nalini as Lalitha
- Viji as Valli
- Sathyaraj as Sathyam
- M. N. Nambiar
- Goundamani

== Production ==
The filming was held at Mudumalai and Bandipur forests.

== Soundtrack ==
The soundtrack was composed by Ilaiyaraaja.

Title	Singers	Lyricist
"Kaattukkulae.."	S. Janaki	Pulamaipithan
"Orunaal Oru Pozhuthu.."	S. Janaki	Pulamaipithan
"Ey Macha Macha.."	S. Janaki, S. P. Balasubrahmanyam	Vairamuthu
"Paduththa Uranguthillai.."	Malaysia Vasudevan, Vani Jairam	Gangai Amaran

== Critical reception ==
Jayamanmadhan of Kalki wrote that if viewers see why the director did not involve them along with the film, it is because the screenplay needs a lot of tonic and nutrition. Balumani of Anna praised the acting of cast but felt none of the songs are noteworthy and many scenes in latter part of the film is plagiarised from American films. He also stated Rajasekhar seems to have directed a film for namesake while actors performed for the namesake.
