= Anbulla Kadhalukku =

- Poster
- Directed by: Mohan
- Written by: Tharmalingam (dialogues)
- Screenplay by: Mohan
- Story by: Mohan
- Produced by: Mohan
- Starring: Mohan; Megha; Sangeetha; Bhavana
- Cinematography: Y. N. Murali
- Edited by: Shankar
- Music by: Deva
- Production company: Paarthy International
- Release date: 17 September 1999
- Country: India
- Language: Tamil

Anbulla Kadhalukku (transl. For My Dearest) is a 1999 Indian Tamil-language romance film written, produced and directed by Mohan. It stars Mohan himself, alongside Megha, Sangeetha and Bhavana; while Anand Babu and Delhi Ganesh appeared in other pivotal roles. The film was released on 17 September 1999, and faced poor commercial response.

== Cast ==
- Mohan as Prem
- Megha as Geetha
- Sangeetha as Priya
- Bhavana as Shanti
- Visu as Chandrasekhar
- Anand Babu as Priya's brother
- Delhi Ganesh as Shanti
- Vaiyapuri as Vengaipuli
- Jai Ganesh as Sundaramoorthy
- Anu Mohan
- Thyagu as Police inspector
- Kumarimuthu
- C. R. Saraswathi as Priya's mother
- K. S. Jayalakshmi
- Scissor Manohar

== Production ==
The film was first announced in April 1998. It marked Mohan's return to acting, following a sabbatical since Uruvam (1991), and is his directorial debut. This was supposed to be the acting debut for one of the lead actresses Megha; however Guru Paarvai was released first. Mohan's hairstyle in the film was inspired by that of Bollywood actor Dev Anand. The film was noted by some media to share a similar storyline to several other Tamil films which released during the same period. Jodi (1999), Minsara Kanna (1999) and Poovellam Kettuppar (1999) all had familiar plots.

== Soundtrack ==
Soundtrack was composed by Deva.

| Song | Singers | Lyrics | Length |
|---|---|---|---|
| "Gnyapagam Irukkutha" | P. Unnikrishnan, Sujatha | Jeevan | 05:05 |
| "Kalyanamma Kalyanam" | Murali, Krishnaraj | Jeevan | 04:59 |
| "Karuppa Irukkattum" | S. P. Balasubrahmanyam | Jeevan | 05:41 |
| "Manmatha Malaiye" | P. Unnikrishnan, Anuradha Sriram | Arivumathi | 04:58 |
| "Yai Elaiye Nilave" | S. P. Balasubrahmanyan | Kavi Ravi | 05:50 |

== Release and reception ==
Anbulla Kadhalukku was released on 17 September 1999. Dinakaran wrote, "Mohan has left the cinegoers spellbound through his one-man show and artful handling of such varied jobs like acting, story creation, production and direction!". D. S. Ramanujam of The Hindu wrote, "As a director, Mohan does a fair job, keeping the spark of interest from flickering out but the lack of depth in screenplay and punch in the dialogue fritter his efforts away". Sify wrote, "Those who want to see Mohan can do so but otherwise the film offers nothing new". The film caused massive losses for Mohan, who again went into hiatus and declined various acting offers as he only wanted leading roles; his next acting credit was Sutta Pazham, released almost a decade later.
