= Saranalayam =

1983 Indian film

- Title card
- Directed by: R. Sundarrajan
- Written by: R. Sundarrajan
- Produced by: S. N. S. Thirumal
- Starring: Mohan; Nalini
- Cinematography: Baby
- Edited by: Kandasamy
- Music by: M. S. Viswanathan
- Production company: Astalakshmi Pictures
- Release date: 30 September 1983
- Running time: 108 minutes
- Country: India
- Language: Tamil

Saranalayam (transl. Sanctuary) is a 1983 Indian Tamil-language romantic drama film written and directed by R. Sundarrajan. The film stars Mohan and Nalini, with Thengai Srinivasan, Manorama, and S. S. Chandran in supporting roles. It was released on 30 September 1983.

== Cast ==
- Mohan as Prabhu
- Nalini as Indhu
- Thengai Srinivasan
- S. S. Chandran
- Karuppu Subbiah
- Kullamani
- Manorama
- Sathyaraj as Magician (guest appearance)
- R. Sundarrajan (guest appearance)

== Soundtrack ==
All songs were composed by M. S. Viswanathan.

Track listing
No.	Title	Lyrics	Singer(s)	Length
1.	"Kollimalai"	Gangai Amaran	Malaysia Vasudevan, S. P. Sailaja	4:03
2.	"Namma Sangiliyil"	Vaali	L. R. Eswari	3:38
3.	"Nedunaalaasai"	Vaali	S. P. Balasubrahmanyam, P. Susheela	4:09
4.	"Ezhuthukiral"	Vaali	Malaysia Vasudevan	4:26
5.	"Indru Kaatrukkum"	Vaali	Malaysia Vasudevan, Vani Jairam	4:11
6.	"Nee Othukitta"	Gangai Amaran	S. P. Balasubrahmanyam	3:05
Total length:				23:32

== Critical reception ==
Balumani of Anna praised the acting, music and cinematography but panned the humour and dialogues and called the film watchable.
