= Santosha Kanavugal =

- VCD cover
- Directed by: R. C. Sakthi
- Written by: R. C. Sakthi
- Produced by: Vijaya Kasinathan; Mangalaselvi Kasinathan
- Starring: Vijayakanth; Nalini
- Cinematography: Viswam Nataraj
- Edited by: B. Kandhasamy
- Music by: Shyam
- Production company: AKM Pictures
- Release date: 1 February 1985
- Running time: 105 minutes
- Country: India
- Language: Tamil

Santosha Kanavugal (transl. Dreams of Happiness) is a 1985 Indian Tamil-language film directed by R. C. Sakthi. The film stars Vijayakanth and Nalini. It was released on 1 February 1985.

== Plot ==
Pandian loves Kalyani and decides to marry her. However, when he is diagnosed with a deadly disease, he persuades his best friend Kannan to marry Kalyani.

== Cast ==
- Vijayakanth as Pandian
- Nalini as Kalyani
- Rajesh as Kannan
- Sathyaraj as the villain
- Dheepa as Gowri
- V. S. Raghavan as Kalyani's father
- Vadivukkarasi as Kalyani's mother
- Thengai Srinivasan as Gowri's father
- S. S. Chandran
- Chinni Jayanth
- Silk Smitha

== Soundtrack ==
The soundtrack was composed by Shyam.

Track listing
| No. | Title | Singer(s) | Length |
|---|---|---|---|
| 1. | "Muthu Muthu" | S. P. Balasubrahmanyam, Vani Jairam |
| 2. | "Uyire Mappillai" | Vani Jairam |
| 3. | "Megangale" | S. P. Balasubrahmanyam, P. Susheela |
| 4. | "Yedho Nadagam" | P. Susheela |
| 5. | "Adai Moodum" | S. Janaki |

== Reception ==
Kalki gave the film a negative review.
