= Sattathai Thiruthungal =

- Title card
- Directed by: Rama Narayanan
- Screenplay by: Rama Narayanan
- Story by: Yandamuri Veerendranath
- Produced by: P. Nageswara Rao
- Starring: Mohan; Nalini
- Cinematography: N. K. Viswanathan
- Edited by: P. Venkateshwara Rao
- Music by: Gangai Amaran
- Production company: P. N. R. Pictures
- Release date: 15 June 1984
- Country: India
- Language: Tamil

Sattathai Thiruthungal (transl. Amend the law) is a 1984 Indian Tamil-language film written and directed by Rama Narayanan. It is a remake of the Telugu film Abhilasha (1983), itself an adaptation of the novel of the same name by Yandamuri Veerendranath. The film stars Mohan and Nalini, with Radha Ravi, Sathyaraj, Y. G. Mahendran and S. S. Chandran in supporting roles. It was released on 15 June 1984.

== Cast ==
- Mohan as Chiranjeevi
- Nalini as Selvi
- Radha Ravi
- Sathyaraj as Sarassi
- Y. G. Mahendran
- S. S. Chandran
- Krishnamoorthy
- T. K. S. Chandran
- Peeli Sivam
- Oru Viral Krishna Rao
- A. R. Kumaresan
- Silk Smitha
- Rajani
- Jaishankar

== Production ==
During the filming of a dance song sequence involving Sathyaraj and Silk Smitha, Sathyaraj accidentally stomped Smitha's leg, and Smitha refused to continue acting with him, but Rama Narayanan pacified her by saying Sathyaraj was not a trained dancer and promised not to let this happen again. The film was originally titled Sattathai Vudaikkiren (transl. I am breaking the law), but was retitled Sattathai Thiruthungal after a request from the censor board.

== Soundtrack ==
The music was composed by Gangai Amaran.

Track listing
No.	Title	Lyrics	Singer(s)	Length
1.	"Poove... Poove..."	Vaali	S. P. Balasubrahmanyam, S. Janaki
2.	"Nandavanam Jailu"	Vaali	S. P. Balasubrahmanyam and chorus
3.	"Vakkilai Love"	Vaali	S. P. Balasubrahmanyam, S. Janaki
4.	"Naan Malithean"	Pulamaipithan	S. P. Sailaja

== Release and reception ==
Sattathai Thiruthungal was released on 15 June 1984. Jayamanmadhan negatively reviewed the film for Kalki, panning Mohan's acting and Rama Narayanan's direction but praised Y. G. Mahendran's humour.
