= Sutta Pazham =

- Directed by: G. K.
- Written by: G. K. A. S. Kannan (dialogues)
- Produced by: Pinttex Creations
- Starring: Mohan; Shubha Poonja
- Cinematography: C. Maya
- Edited by: R. K. Udhayakumar
- Music by: Sri Sam (songs); Raj Bhaskar (score)
- Production company: Pinttex Creations
- Release date: 25 July 2008
- Running time: 130 minutes
- Country: India
- Language: Tamil

Sutta Pazham (transl. Stolen fruit) is a 2008 Indian Tamil language adult comedy thriller film directed by G. K.. The film stars Mohan and Shubha Poonja, with R. N. R. Manohar, Livingston, Manobala, Vennira Aadai Moorthy, M. S. Bhaskar, Anu Mohan, Kullamani, and Soundar playing supporting roles. The film had music by Sri Sam, cinematography by C. Maya, and editing by R. K. Udhayakumar. The film released on 25 July 2008.

== Plot ==
In Chennai, men and women are mysteriously killed, and the police cannot find a single clue to catch the serial killer. Later, the police cast suspicion on Nandakumar (Mohan), an innocent and single man who runs a resort on the coastal road. They believe that he is a dangerous sexual predator. The police department tasks Inspector Vandana (Shubha Poonja) with finding enough evidence to convict Nandakumar. Vandana poses as a TV serial dialogue writer and asks Nandakumar for a room in the resort. Nandakumar has no rooms but is under pressure to keep her in his own room to gain money and repay his loans.

Vandana tries to seduce Nandakumar on multiple occasions by wearing sexy dresses and exposing her body, but she fails every time. Vandana finally realizes that Nandakumar is an innocent man who has nothing to do with that case, and she falls in love with him. Thereafter, Vandhana finds the culprit: the local church father (R. N. R. Manohar) who lives in a church near Nandakumar's resort. The church father finds her in his room. He manages to tie her up, and he then confesses to the murders. He tells her that he is not a real church father, and he killed the victims for having an extramarital affair or premarital sex. In the meantime, Nandakumar is chased by the police, and he enters the church to hide from them. The police then free Vandana, and she reveals that the church father is the killer; thus, the church father is arrested. Nandakumar and Vandana live happily ever after.

== Cast ==
- Mohan as Nandakumar (Nandu)
- Shubha Poonja as Police Inspector Vandana
- R. N. R. Manohar as Church Father
- Livingston as Inspector Prasad
- Manobala as Assistant Commissioner
- Vennira Aadai Moorthy as Moorthy
- M. S. Bhaskar as Kumaraswamy
- Anu Mohan as Mani
- Kullamani
- Soundar as Head Constable
- Chaplin Balu as Man at the wine shop
- Udumalai Ravi as Man at the wine shop
- Sharmili as Keerthi
- Bava Lakshmanan
- Nellai Siva
- Gemini Balaji
- Sempuli Jagan
- Kumtaz

== Production ==
G. K. made his directorial with Sutta Pazham under the banner of Pinttex Creations. The veteran actor Mohan, who was last seen in Anbulla Kadhalukku (1999), returned to the screen to play the lead role, while Shubha Poonja was chosen to play the heroine. The film was shot in Munnar and Chennai. The makers said that film was an adult comedy-thriller, but there was no vulgarity or crudeness.

== Soundtrack ==
The soundtrack was composed by Sri Sam. It was released on 16 July 2008 at the radio station Hello FM in Chennai.

All lyrics are written by Snehan.

Track listing
No.	Title	Length
1.	"Thaen Mazhai"
2.	"Sutta Pazham"
3.	"Kuliradikkudhae"
4.	"Azhagu Azhagu"
5.	"Uyirilae Uyirilae"

== Release ==
The film was released on 25 July 2008 alongside another erotic film, Pathu Pathu. The two films releasing that week were butchered by the censor board and carried "A" certificates as they had an overdose of sex and smutty dialogues.
