= Shondham 16 =

- Directed by: T. S. Krishna Kumar
- Screenplay by: T. S. Krishna Kumar
- Story by: T. Dorairaj
- Produced by: T. S. Krishna Kumar; Malarkodi Dorairaj
- Starring: Mohan; Kalyani
- Cinematography: Babu
- Edited by: Srinivas Krishna
- Music by: Shankar–Ganesh
- Production company: Sri Durga Films
- Release date: 1989
- Country: India
- Language: Tamil

Shondham 16 is a 1989 Indian Tamil-language film written, directed and co-produced by T. S. Krishna Kumar. The film stars Mohan and debutante Kalyani.

== Plot ==
Mohan plays an orphan attempting to marry the girl he is in love with. Challenges crop up when his would-be father-in-law has a condition that the groom should have a large joint family. Desperate to marry her, he lies he has sixteen relatives who live with him and sets his office colleagues up as his relatives.

However, upon seeing that all his relatives depend on him for everything, the father-in-law changes his mind deciding that all relatives are self-serving. In the end, when they all donate blood to save Mohan's life, he understands the truth and the marriage is solemnised.

== Cast ==
- Mohan as Varadarajan
- Kalyani as Sundari
- Chandrasekhar as Murthy
- Manorama as Ponnaathaa
- Pakoda Kadhar as Rent house owner
- Kumarimuthu as Constable
- Master Haja Sheriff as Shankaran Office Peon
- Adade Manohar as Manager Rahman
- S. S. Chandran as Chakravarthy
- Thyagu as Thyagu
- Charle as Gopalan Office Peon
- Senthil as Munusamy
- Kovai Sarala as Babyamma
- Disco Shanti as Kusalamba Thiyagu's acting wife
- Bindu Ghosh as Lilly
- Lalitha Kumari as Lalitha
- Dilip as Ramesh
- J Lalitha as Bhuvana

== Production ==
Shondham 16 was directed by T. S. Krishna Kumar, and produced by him and Malarkodi Dorairaj under Sri Durga Films. Krishna Kumar also wrote the screenplay, while T. Dorairaj wrote the story and dialogues. Cinematography was handled by Babu, and editing by Srinivas Krishna. This is the debut film of Kalyani. It was also a rare Tamil film in which Mohan dubbed in his own voice.

== Soundtrack ==
The music was composed by Shankar–Ganesh, and the lyrics were written by Vaalee.

Track listing
No.	Title	Singer(s)	Length
1.	"Amman Koil Theralagu"	S. P. Balasubrahmanyam
2.	"Or Iravil Unnai Naan"	K. S. Chithra, Mano
3.	"Kudirai Mela Era"	Mano
4.	"Aayiram Aayiram"	Chorus
5.	"Shondham 16 Undu"	K. J. Yesudas

== Release ==
P. S. S. of Kalki likened the film to a stage play.
