= Vaiki Odunna Vandi =

- Directed by: P. K. Radhakrishnan
- Produced by: P. K. Radhakrishnan
- Starring: Nalini
- Music by: Raveendran
- Production company: Suradha Films
- Distributed by: Suradha Films
- Release date: 28 August 1987
- Country: India
- Language: Malayalam

Vaiki Odunna Vandi is a 1987 Indian Malayalam film, directed and produced by P. K. Radhakrishnan. The film stars Nalini in the lead role. The film has musical score by Raveendran.

== Cast ==
- Nalini

== Soundtrack ==
The music was composed by Raveendran and the lyrics were written by Ezhacheri Ramachandran.

No.	Song	Singers	Lyrics	Length (m:ss)
1	"Maayanagaram"	K. J. Yesudas	Ezhacheri Ramachandran	
2	"Swapnangal Seemantha"	P. Jayachandran, Chorus, S. P. Sailaja	Ezhacheri Ramachandran	
