= Deivapiravi (1985 film) =

- Theatrical release poster
- Directed by: R. Krishnamoorthy
- Written by: V. C. Guhanathan (dialogues)
- Based on: Devatha by K. Raghavendra Rao
- Produced by: D. Ramanaidu
- Starring: Mohan; Radhika; Urvashi
- Cinematography: Vinayagam
- Edited by: Chakrapani
- Music by: Shankar–Ganesh
- Production company: Suresh Productions
- Release date: 14 April 1985
- Country: India
- Language: Tamil

Deivapiravi (transl. Noble Soul) is a 1985 Indian Tamil-language romantic drama film directed by R. Krishnamoorthy, starring Mohan, Radhika, and Urvashi. It is a remake of the Telugu film Devatha (1982). The film was released on 14 April 1985 and ran for one-hundred days in theatres.

== Cast ==
- Mohan as Mohan
- Radhika as Janaki
- Urvashi as Lalitha
- Radha Ravi as Minor
- Oppanai Gajapathi
- V. K. Ramasamy
- Thengai Srinivasan
- Idichapuli Selvaraj
- Master Suresh
- Manorama
- Pushpalatha
- C. I. D. Sakunthala as Ayya
- S. N. Lakshmi

== Production ==
The film is directed by R. Krishnamoorthy, who was known for directing Billa (1980), and produced by D. Ramanaidu under his banner Suresh Productions. Ramanaidu had produced the original film Devatha (1982). Cinematography was handled by Vinayagam, and editing by Chakrapani. The song "Marappu Potta Ponnu" was shot at Mysore.

== Soundtrack ==
The songs are composed by Shankar–Ganesh. S. P. Balasubrahmanyam and P. Susheela, who sang for the original film, also sang for this film.

All lyrics are written by Vaali.

Track listing
No.	Title	Singer(s)	Length
1.	"Mounam Ennum Ragam"	S. P. Balasubrahmanyam, P. Suseela	4:44
2.	"Poovai Oru Poo"	S. P. Balasubrahmanyam, P. Susheela	5:19
3.	"Nil Nil Nil Nil Elan Thendraley"	S. P. Balasubrahmanyam, P. Susheela	4:34
4.	"Marappu Potta Ponnu"	Malaysia Vasudevan, P.Susheela	4:31
5.	"Paanaile Paal Erukku"	S. P. Balasubrahmanyam, P. Susheela	5:32
Total length:			24:40

== Release and reception ==
Deivapiravi was released on 14 April 1985 coinciding with Puthandu. The film faced competition from two other Mohan-starrers Udaya Geetham, which released a day earlier, and Pillai Nila. The film was not as successful as those films, but ran for one-hundred days. Mohan gained appreciation for his performance in the film. Jayamanmadhan of Kalki wrote leaving the theatre feels like it was like sitting day before yesterday probably because Hindi film ran because of Sridevi.
