= Nalini (actress) =

Indian actress (born 1966)

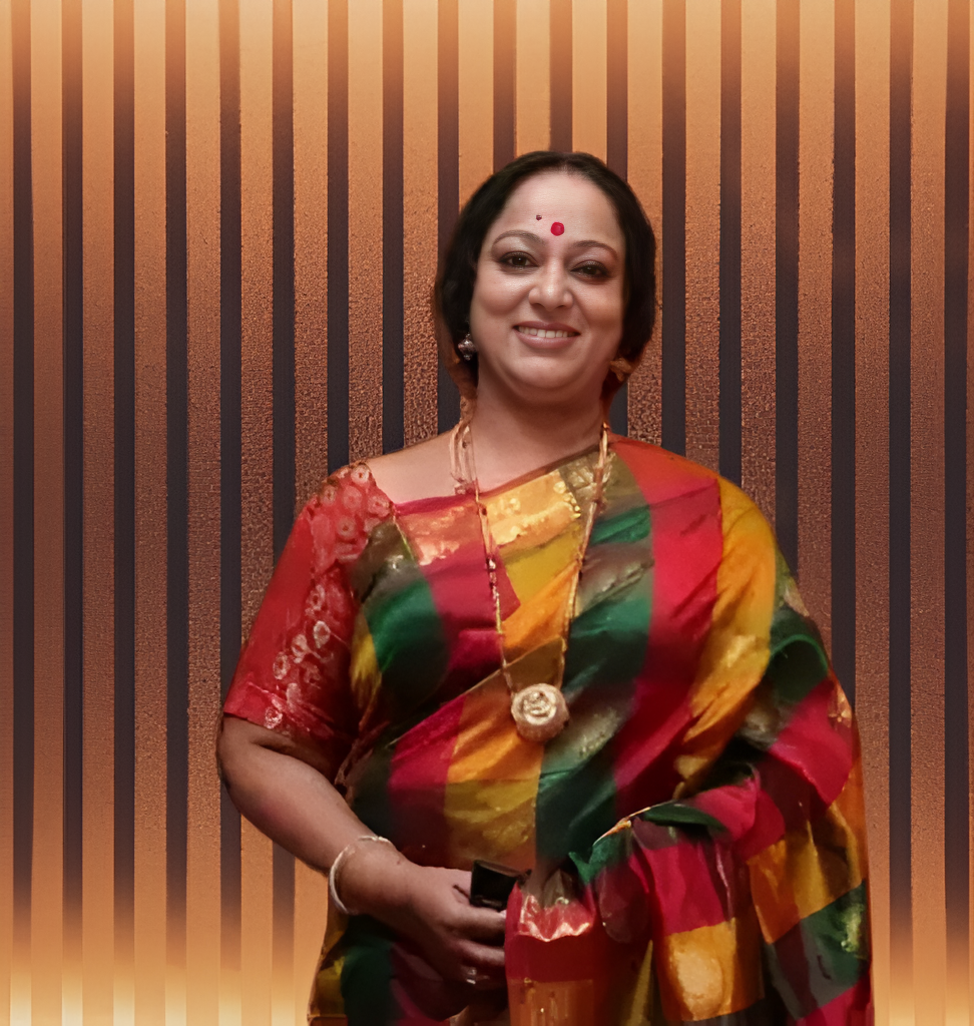
- Born: 28 August 1964 (age 62); Chennai, Tamil Nadu, India
- Occupation: Actress
- Years active: 1980–1988; 2001–present
- Spouse: Ramarajan (m. 1987; div. 2000)
- Children: 2

Nalini (born 28 August 1964) is an Indian actress known for her work in Tamil, Malayalam, Telugu and Kannada films and worked in television.

== Personal life ==
Nalini was born in August 1964 as the second among eight children to Moorthi and Prema in Tamil Nadu. Her father was a choreographer in Tamil movies, and her mother was a professional dancer. She has 7 siblings, one sister and six brothers. She studied at TN government school until grade seven; she could not continue her studies as she became busy with movies.

Nalini married actor Ramarajan in 1987. The couple has twins: Aruna and Arun, born in 1988. However, they divorced, citing differences, in 2000. Her daughter Aruna married Ramesh Subramanian on 6 May 2013.

== Filmography ==
=== Tamil films ===
Year	Title	Role	Notes	Ref
1981	Ranuva Veeran	Mythili		
1982	Raga Bandhangal			
1982	Om Shakti	Anandhi		
1983	Uyirullavarai Usha	Usha		
1983	Seerum Singangal	Uma		
1983	Kalvadiyum Pookal	Janaki		
1983	Saranalayam	Indhu		
1983	Thodi Ragam			
1983	Thangaikkor Geetham	Sudha		
1983	Manaivi Solle Manthiram	Selvi		
1984	Manmadha Rajakkal	Rani		
1984	Vengaiyin Mainthan	Shanthi		
1984	Nooravathu Naal	Devi		
1984	Vellai Pura Ondru	Devi		
1984	Naan Paadum Paadal	Lakshmi	Special appearance	
1984	Nyayam	Radha		
1984	Nalla Naal	Shenbagam		
1984	Sattathai Thiruthungal	Selvi		
1984	Veetuku Oru Kannagi	Maadhavi		
1984	Thanga Koppai	Manju		
1984	24 Mani Neram	Janaki		
1984	Magudi	Yamuna		
1984	Ezhuthatha Sattangal	Noorajahan		
1984	Nandri	Lakshmi		
1984	Naalai Unathu Naal	Kalpana		
1984	Osai	Radha		
1984	Vamsa Vilakku	Padma		
1984	Nichayam			
1985	Raja Gopuram	Ponnuthayi		
1985	Rajathi Rojakili	Rani		
1985	Alai Osai	Vadivu		
1985	Santhosha Kanavukal	Kalyani		
1985	Mannukketha Ponnu	Janaki	Guest appearance	
1985	Navagraha Nayagi	Princess		
1985	Pillai Nila	Bhuvaneswari		
1985	Melmaruvathur Adhiparasakthi	Karpagam		
1985	Kaaval	Shanthi		
1985	Annai Bhoomi	Nalini		
1985	Meendum Parasakthi	Anu		
1985	Unnai Thedi Varuven	Devi		
1985	Amudha Gaanam	Thayamma		
1985	Veettukkari	Raasi		
1985	Urimai	Rani / Clara		
1985	Engal Kural	Meena		
1985	Eetti	Lalitha		
1985	Ragasiyam	Selvi		
1985	Yaar?	Devi		
1985	Raja Rishi	Shakuntala		
1985	Naan Ungal Rasigan	Vidya		
1985	Geethanjali	Diana		
1985	Samayapurathale Satchi	Gayathri / Goddess Mariamman	Dual role	
1985	Asha	Asha		
1985	Sivappu Kili			
1986	Saadhanai	Oorvashi Ganga / Kamatchi		
1986	December Pookal	Uma		
1986	Karimedu Karuvayan	Kaaliammal		
1986	Kagidha Odam			
1986	Mamiyargal Jaakiradhai	Selvi		
1986	Ragasiyam	Selvi		
1986	Unnidathil Naan	Maadhavi		
1986	Africavil Appu			
1986	Iravu Pookkal	Meena		
1986	Mel Maruvathoor Arpudhangal	Karpagam		
1986	Palaivana Rojakkal	Rani		
1987	Thaye Neeye Thunai	Uma		
1987	Vilangu	Nancy	Guest appearance	
1987	Ini Oru Sudhanthiram	Marudagam		
1987	Kadamai Kanniyam Kattupaadu			
1987	Jaathi Pookkal	Rani		
1987	Anjatha Singam	Rani		
1988	Kunguma Kodu	Radha		
1988	Kazhugumalai Kallan			
2002	Kadhal Azhivathillai	Charmi's mother		
2002	Style	Vetrivel's mother		
2003	Pallavan	Amudha		
2003	Vadakku Vaasal	Priya's mother		
2003	Jayam	Raghu's mother		
2004	Kavithai	Subbalakshmi's stepmother		
2005	Sukran	Sandhya's stepmother		
2005	London	Baby		
2005	Jithan	Surya's mother		
2005	Mudhal Aasai	Vignesh's mother		
2005	Vanakkam Thalaiva	Mano's aunt		
2006	Manasukkule			
2006	Adaikalam	Doctor		
2007	18 Vayasu Puyale	Vasantha		
2007	Manikanda	Mahalakshmi's mother		
2008	Maanavan Ninaithal	Nivetha's mother		
2008	Azhagu Nilayam	Gounder's wife		
2008	Saroja	Herself	Special appearance	
2009	Pudhiya Payanam	Muthu's stepmother		
2009	Iru Nadhigal	Murugan's mother		
2010	Nagaram Marupakkam	Annachi's first wife		
2010	Kathai	Actress		
2010	Pournami Nagam	Kaandhari		
2010	Thillalangadi	Vannai Vasanthi		
2011	Madhuvum Mythiliyum	Madhu's mother		
2011	Malabar Mappillai			
2011	Vattapparai			
2011	Nachiyarpuram			
2011	Kasethan Kadavulada	Kamala		
2013	Theeya Velai Seiyyanum Kumaru	Annakili		
2013	Thiru Pugazh	Thiru Pugazh's mother		
2013	Arya Surya	Sivagami		
2013	Naankam Thamizhan			
2014	Namma Gramam	Kunju Ammal		
2014	Vazhum Dheivam	Jagadeeshwariyamma		
2014	13 Aam Pakkam Paarkka	Kamatchi		
2015	Sandamarutham	Surya's mother		
2015	Agathinai	Vishnu's mother		
2015	Kalai Vendhan	Malar's mother		
2016	Saagasam	Neighbor		
2017	Singam 3	Thandubazaar Thangam		
2017	Karanam			
2018	Kasu Mela Kasu	Murali's paternal aunt		
2020	Ayya Ullen Ayya			
2021	Aranmanai 3	TikTok Sarala		
2023	Kodai	Reels Beauty		
2023	Paatti Sollai Thattathe	Lakshmi		
2025	Konjam Kadhal Konjam Modhal	Sarassu		
2026	Youth	Mrs. Grace		

=== Malayalam films ===
Year	Film	Role	Notes
1980	Ithile Vannavar	Raji	
1981	Agnisaram		
1982	Kattupothu		
1982	Idavela	Molu/Malu	
1982	Novemberinte Nashtam	Rekha	
1983	Lekhayude Maranam Oru Flashback	Lekha	
1983	Mounaraagam	Neena	
1983	Coolie	Lekha	
1983	Oru Madapravinte Katha	Sindhu	
1986	Oru Yugasandhya	Sumathi	
1986	Vartha	Vasanthy	
1986	Nimishangal	Maya	
1986	Snehamulla Simham	Maya S. Menon	
1986	Aavanazhi	Usha	
1986	Adimakal Udamakal	Devootty	
1987	Bhoomiyile Rajakkanmar	Lakshmi	
1987	Vazhiyorakazchakal		
1987	Vaiki Odunna Vandi		
1988	Sanghunadam	Sulochana	
1990	Niyamam Enthucheyyum		
2001	Ravanaprabhu	Mrs. Gounder	
2008	Mohitham	Radhamani	
2010	Best of Luck	Doctor	
2012	Gramam	Kunju Ammaal	
2017	Sathya	Dr. Kokila	

=== Telugu films ===
Year	Title	Role	Notes
1983	Sangharshana	Rekha	
1983	Thodu Needa		
1983	Prema Sagaram		
1983	Bandipottu Simham		
1983	Ooha Sundari		
1984	Intiguttu		
1986	Ashtalakshmi Vaibhavam	Goddess Parvati	
1986	Manavudu Danavudu		
1987	Prema Jayam		
2003	Veede	Swarnakka	
2003	Seetayya		
2009	Kick	Naina's friend's mother	
2009	Punnami Naagu	Mayadevi Bhairavi	
2012	Nuvvekkadunte Nenakkadunta		
2012	Yadartha Premakatha		
2013	Something Something		
2016	Okka Ammayi Thappa	Mango's Grandmother	
2018	Brand Babu		

=== Kannada films ===
Year	Title	Role	Notes
1983	Kaviratna Kalidasa	Goddess Kali	Credited as Anandi
1984	Shapatha	Radha	
1986	Belli Naaga		
1987	Jeevana Jyothi	Meena	
1987	Aaseya Bale		
1988	Namma Bhoomi		
1988	Gandandre Gandu	Meena	

== Television ==
=== Serials ===
Year	Title	Role	Language	Channel
2000–2001	Krishnadasi	Manonmani	Tamil	Sun TV
2001	Soolam		Tamil	Sun TV
2002	Nambikkai	Pottukaara Amma	Tamil	Sun TV
2003	Anbu Manam		Tamil	Sun TV
2003–2009	Kolangal	Alamelu Narayanan	Tamil	Sun TV
2004–2005	Chinna Papa Periya Papa	Chinna Paapa	Tamil	Sun TV
2004	Krishna Cottage		Tamil	Jaya TV
2006–2009	Bandham	Adhilakshmi	Tamil	Sun TV
2007–2009	Porantha Veeda Pugundha Veeda		Tamil	Sun TV
2008–2009	Jeyam		Tamil	Jaya TV
2009–2012	Idhayam	Mangalam	Tamil	Sun TV
2009–2011	Madhavi	Devaki	Tamil	Sun TV
2009–2011	Kichu Kichu Tambalam		Tamil	Sun TV
2009–2011	Dhinam Dhinam Deepavali		Tamil	Sun TV
2009	Enge Brahmanan		Tamil	Jaya TV
2010–2012	Pondatti Thevai		Tamil	Sun TV
2010–2012	Maama Maaple		Tamil	Sun TV
2012	All In All Alamelu	Alamelu	Tamil	KTV
2013	Pokkisham		Tamil	Kalaignar TV
2012	Pillai Nila	Kalyani	Tamil	Sun TV
2012	Bahumanapetta Bharya	Maheshwari Amma	Malayalam	DD Malayalam
2013	Rajakumari	Malliga	Tamil	Sun TV
2013–2015	Madipakkam Madhavan	Pandari Bai	Tamil	Kalaignar TV
2013–2014	Chellakilli		Tamil	Sun TV
2013–2014	Vaidehi	Dr. Bharathi	Tamil	Jaya TV
2014	Kalyana Parisu	Hostel Warden	Tamil	Sun TV
2014	En Iniya Thozhiye		Tamil	Raj TV
2014–2018	Chinna Papa Periya Papa	Chinna Papa	Tamil	Sun TV
2014–2017	Amma Naa Kodala	Anasuyamma	Telugu	Zee Telugu
2016–2017	Darling Darling		Tamil	Zee Tamil
2016	Mahamayi	Chinna Papa	Tamil	Zee Tamil
2017–2018	Vani Rani	Krishnaveni	Tamil	Sun TV
2017	Matrudevobhava		Telugu	Gemini TV
2018–2020	Ganga Manga		Telugu	Zee Telugu
2018–2019	Chandralekha	Arivu Azaghi	Tamil	Sun TV
2019–2020	Bhagyarekha	Chittemma	Telugu	Gemini TV
2019–2022	Gokulathil Seethai	Gandhimati	Tamil	Zee Tamil
2020–2021	Sundari Neeyum Sundaram Naanum	Vijayalakshmi	Tamil	Vijay TV
2021	Sembaruthi	Dr.Girija	Tamil	Zee Tamil
2021–2022	Nee Varuvai Ena	Annapoorani	Tamil	Raj TV
2021	Roja	Parameshwari	Tamil	Sun TV
2021–2022	Janaki Kalaganaledu	Mairavathi	Telugu	Star Maa
2022	Valli Thirumanam	Vadivu	Tamil	Colors Tamil
2022–2023	Rajini	Azhagamma	Tamil	Zee Tamil
2023	Indira	Chinnaponnu	Tamil	Zee Tamil
2023–2024	Modhalum Kaadhalum	Gajalakshmi	Tamil	Star Vijay
2023	Kannathil Muthamittal		Tamil	Zee Tamil
2023	Mansion 24	Devudamma	Telugu	Disney+Hotstar
2024–2026	Malli	Annapoorni	Tamil	Sun TV
2024	Ninaithen Vandhai	Kasiammal	Tamil	Zee Tamil
2025	Chamanthi	Rani Annapurna Devi	Telugu	Zee Telugu
2025–2026	Parijatham	Alankaaram	Tamil	Zee Tamil
2026	Samanthi	Rani	Tamil	Zee Tamil

=== Shows ===
Year	Title	Role	Language	Channel
2010	Rani Maharani	Participant	Malayalam	Surya TV
2014	Celebrity Kitchen	Guest	Tamil	Puthuyugam TV
2014	Celebrity Kitchen	Guest	Tamil	Puthuyugam TV
2021	Rajaparvai	Guest	Tamil	Sun TV
2022	Pottikku Potti	Participant	Tamil	Colors Tamil
2022	Joker Poker	Participant	Tamil	Zee Tamil
2023	Tamizha Tamizha	Guest	Tamil	Zee Tamil
2023	Start Music Season 4	Contestant	Tamil	Star Vijay
