= Manaivi Solle Manthiram =

- Poster
- Directed by: Rama Narayanan
- Written by: P. Kalaimani
- Produced by: P. Kalaimani
- Starring: Mohan; Nalini; Pandiyan; Ilavarasi
- Cinematography: N. K. Viswanathan
- Edited by: K. Gouthaman
- Music by: Ilaiyaraaja
- Production company: Everest Films
- Release date: 4 November 1983
- Running time: 129 minutes
- Country: India
- Language: Tamil

Manaivi Solle Manthiram (transl. Wife's word is a mantra) is a 1983 Indian Tamil-language film, directed by Rama Narayanan and produced and written by P. Kalaimani. The film stars Mohan, Nalini, Pandiyan and Ilavarasi. It was released on 4 November 1983.

== Plot ==
Thyagu, a doctor by profession, falls in love with Selvi, and their wedding is planned. However, Thyagu's parents demand a huge dowry, for which Selvi's father agrees and pays off by selling his property. Post marriage, Selvi finds Thyagu's parents to be irresponsible, who just prefer spending money lavishly. They end up spending the entire amount of money, which they received as a dowry from Selvi's father. Selvi brings this up to Thyagu. Although Thyagu understands that his parents' activities are not correct, he does not have the courage to point out their mistakes. Now Selvi decides to teach a lesson for Thyagu's parents.

Thyagu's sister falls in love with Selvi's brother, following which she gets pregnant even before the wedding. Now it is Selvi's father's turn to take revenge on Thyagu's parents by asking for the same amount as dowry in order to get them married. Thyagu also has a younger brother, Bharathan, who is a spoiled brat just roaming around. He falls in love with a poor girl, Rani, and gets married without the consent of his parents. Thyagu decides to work overtime to earn more money as he is the only breadwinner in the family.

Thyagu gets transferred to another city and leaves alone for work. Selvi tactfully sends Bharathan and his wife out from their home, mentioning that they are not contributing to the family's income. Bharathan and Rani leave their home and start a small roadside eatery, which clicks well, and they open a decent restaurant, thereby settling well in life. Selvi also plays a trick and sends Thyagu's parents away from their home. Thyagu returns home again after transferring back and is shocked to see his family members are out of his home. Meanwhile, Thyagu's sister's marriage to Selvi's brother has already happened, and she has given birth to a baby as well. Thyagu visits Selvi's father and gives the dowry he requested.

Thyagu sends Selvi out from his home, angered by her activities. Thyagu's home has been hypothecated to a bank, and the bank officials come to seize the home for non-repayment of the loan. Thyagu is devastated as he loses his job as well due to his carelessness, which has resulted in the death of a patient. Knowing all this, Thyagu's parents decide to leave him and stay with Bharathan, who is rich now. Thyagu is left alone and worries. Now, he realises the value of his wife and understands that all her activities were only for the good of his family. He decides to call Selvi back; however, he faints and gets admitted to the hospital, where it is diagnosed that high stress has resulted in some serious illness, which requires an immediate surgery. Selvi comes for rescue, and she pays the hospital bill with the help of the dowry which her father received, and Thyagu is saved. Finally, Thyagu unites with Selvi.

== Cast ==
- Mohan as Thyagu
- Nalini as Selvi
- Pandiyan as Bharathan
- Ilavarasi as Rani
- Vennira Aadai Moorthy as Thyagu's father
- Vinu Chakravarthy as Balakrishnan
- Kallapetti Singaram as Selvi's father
- Manohar as Gopal
- Rajasulochana as Thyagu's mother
- Kullamani
- Yugalakshmi
- T. K. S. Chandran
- Cenchi Krishnan
- Bailwan Renganathan
- Usilimani
- Sivaraman

== Production ==
The film was launched on 6 June 1983 at Prasad Studios.

== Soundtrack ==
The music was composed by Ilaiyaraaja.

Song	Singers	Lyrics	Length
"Athadi Adhisayam"	K. J. Yesudas and Uma Ramanan	Muthulingam	04:54
"Maama Thallippadu"	S. P. Balasubrahmanyam and S. P. Sailaja	Vairamuthu	04:31
"Maami Maare"	Malaysia Vasudevan and S. P. Sailaja	Gangai Amaran	04:03
"Maane Maanguyile"	Malaysia Vasudevan and Janaki	Vairamuthu	04:23
"Manaivi Solle Manthiram"	Ilaiyaraaja	Gangai Amaran	03:57

== Reception ==
Jayamanmadhan of Kalki panned the vulgarity in songs and scenes and Mohan's acting but praised Vinu Chakravarthy's acting and Ilaiyaraaja's music.
