= 24 Mani Neram =

- VCD cover
- Directed by: Manivannan
- Written by: Manivannan
- Produced by: S. N. S. Thirumal
- Starring: Mohan; Sathyaraj; Nalini
- Cinematography: A. Sabapathi
- Edited by: B. Kandasamy
- Music by: Ilaiyaraaja
- Production company: Thirupathisamy Pictures
- Release date: 20 July 1984
- Country: India
- Language: Tamil

24 Mani Neram (read as "Irupatthi Naalu Mani Neram"; transl. 24 Hours) is a 1984 Indian Tamil-language thriller film written and directed by Manivannan, starring Mohan, Sathyaraj, and Nalini. The music was composed by Ilaiyaraaja with editing by B. Kandasamy and cinematography by A. Sabapathi.

The film was released on 18 July 1984 and was a commercial success, running for 27 weeks. The film was remade in Kannada as Jayabheri (1989).

== Plot ==
Raj is a prisoner serving a life sentence. He befriends his cellmates and asks for their cooperation to escape from prison. When they ask him for a reason, he reveals his past.

Raj is a professional photographer and his wife Janaki is a doctor. He gets introduced to X. W. Ramarathinam, a wealthy businessman who sexually molests women and kills them to hide the truth. Ramarathinam's eyes turn towards Janaki, while celebrating her wedding anniversary at his luxury hotel. Ramarathinam attempts to manipulate her into becoming his mistress. Janaki rejects the offer and informs Raj, and he tries to expose Ramarathinam by writing about him in his magazine. Ramarathinam retaliates by molesting and killing Janaki’s death, and convicting Raj through a false witness.

Back to the present, Raj's cellmates agree to help him with his escape plan. During the escape, others get captured by the police and Raj alone escapes. He calls Ramarathinam and vows to kill him within 24 hours. Raj tracks the false witness who testified against him, only to find out Ramarathinam killed her as well. Ramarathinam's sidekick tries to kills Raj, but Raj escapes. Enraged, Ramarathinam kills his sidekick. The sidekick's sister Swapna, who is also Ramarathinam’s PA, helps Raj to escape from the police. Ramarathinam kills Swapna as well. However, Raj enters Ramarathinam's birthday celebrations as a waiter, and shoots him exactly when the 24-hr ultimatum ends.

== Cast ==
- Mohan as Raj
- Sathyaraj as X.W. Ramarathinam
- Nalini as Janaki
- Jaishankar as Jailer Vijay (no spoken lines)
- Vadivukkarasi as Lakshmi, Raj's mother
- Swapna as Swapna
- Ilavarasi as Rekha
- Chinni Jayanth as Seenu
- Senthil as Sidekick
- Jyothi Lakshmi in a special appearance
- Jayamalini in a special appearance
- Anuradha in a special appearance
- Bayilvan Ranganathan as Marutha Muthu

== Production ==
Manivannan retained three actors from his Nooravathu Naal – Mohan, Sathyaraj and Nalini – for this film. Sathyaraj initially suggested S. Balachander or M. N. Nambiar for the role of the antagonist, but Manivannan urged him to do the role.

== Soundtrack ==
Lyrics were written by Pulamaipithan and composed by Ilaiyaraaja.

Track listing
No.	Title	Singer(s)	Length
1.	"Kulikkum Pothile"	Malaysia Vasudevan, S. Janaki
2.	"Kalloori Manavaraa"	S. Janaki, S. P. Sailaja

== Release and reception ==
24 Mani Neram was released on 20 July 1984. Jayamanmadhan of Kalki said the story was old fashioned, but praised the manner in which it was told. Balumani of Anna praised acting, music and cinematography and praised Manivannan for directing the film without losing the pace from beginning to end. The film was a success, and is considered among the most significant projects for Mohan, Sathyaraj and Nalini.
