= Darja Donga =

- Theatrical release poster
- Directed by: Manivannan
- Written by: Sainath Thotapalli (dialogues)
- Screenplay by: Manivannan
- Story by: Sathyaraj
- Produced by: R. Ramakrishnam Raju
- Starring: Suman; Vijayashanti; Sathyaraj; Rajendra Prasad
- Cinematography: Sabhapathi
- Edited by: Kotagiri Venkateswara Rao
- Music by: Ilaiyaraaja
- Production company: Sri Vijayalakshmi Arts
- Release date: 14 June 1985
- Country: India
- Language: Telugu

Darja Donga (transl. 'The royal thief') is a 1985 Telugu-language action thriller film directed by Manivannan. Produced by R. Ramakrishnam Raju, the film stars Suman and Vijayashanti with Sathyaraj as the main antagonist and Rajendra Prasad in a supporting role. The music was composed by Ilayaraja. The film was dubbed into Tamil as Marma Manithan.

== Cast ==
- Suman as Raja
- Vijayashanti as Jayanthi
- Sathyaraj as Harichandra Prasad
- Rajendra Prasad as Prasad
- Sarath Babu as Inspector Sarath
- Sridhar as Sridhar
- Manohar as Manohar
- Deepa as Shyamala
- Varalakshmi as Mumtaz
- Silk Smitha as item number
- Anuradha as item number

== Soundtrack ==
Darja Donga

Film score by Ilaiyaraaja
- Released: 1985
- Genre: Soundtrack
- Length: 22:07
- Label: ECHO Audio
- Producer: Ilaiyaraaja

Ilaiyaraaja chronology
Preminchu Pelladu (1985)	Darja Donga (1985)	Sindhu Bhairavi (1985)

Music was composed by Ilaiyaraaja. Lyrics were written by Veturi. The music released on ECHO Audio Company.

S. No.	Song title	Singers	length
1	"Chali Chali"	S. P. Balasubrahmanyam, S. Janaki	4:17
2	"Hello Hello Chalaaki Pilla"	S. P. Balasubrahmanyam	4:37
3	"Manasula Gusa Gusa"	S. P. Balasubrahmanyam, S. Janaki	4:29
4	"Naalo Chinukulatho"	S. P. Balasubrahmanyam, S. Janaki	4:22
5	"Thappu Kaadhuraa"	S. P. Balasubrahmanyam, S. Janaki	4:22
