= Pillai Nila =

1985 film by Manobala

- Poster
- Directed by: Manobala
- Written by: P. Kalaimani
- Produced by: P. Kalaimani
- Starring: Mohan; Radhika; Jaishankar; Nalini; Baby Shalini
- Cinematography: Ashok Kumar
- Music by: Ilaiyaraaja
- Production company: Kalaimani Pictures
- Release date: 14 April 1985
- Country: India
- Language: Tamil

Pillai Nilla (transl. Waxing Crescent) is a 1985 Indian Tamil-language psychological horror film directed by Manobala, produced and written by P. Kalaimani. The film stars Mohan, Radhika, Jaishankar, Nalini, and Baby Shalini. It was released on 14 April 1985 and emerged a commercial success.

== Plot ==
Dolli is the spoilt young sister of a widowed rich man named David. She goes to the extent of buying the college where is a student, just because the Principal reprimands her, and fires the Principal. She falls in love with Mohan, who is a student in a college she owns. Before she tries to express her love, she suddenly flies abroad for business. Meanwhile, in India, Mohan's mother gets him married to his cousin Bhuvana. When Dolli returns from abroad on her birthday, she expresses her love to Mohan, but he rejects her because his wife is pregnant. Dolli tries to convince Mohan and his mom to nullify his marriage to Bhuvana and accept her instead. They both refuse despite Dolli promising them lot of money in return. Dejected, Dolli commits suicide in front of Mohan's eyes. Bhuvana gives birth at the same time. David swears to kill the person who refused to accept Dolli.

Years later, Mohan realizes his daughter Shalini is haunted by Dolli's spirit. He gets her evaluated by a psychiatrist, but nothing useful comes out of it. First, Dolli's spirit tries to strangle Mohan's mother through Shalini, but Mohan saves his mom. Based on the psychiatrist's advice, he sends his mother to their native village, but Shalini also goes with her. Mohan finds this out a little late and chases their train but Shalini/Dolli kills his mom by pushing her from the train.

David hires Saint Cromeo, an exorcist, to talk to Dolli's spirit and find out her lover, but Dolli refuses to reveal the details and says she will kill her lover's family herself. Mohan watches this and gets extremely concerned. He consults a psychic who suggests cremating Dolli's remains is the only way to escape her wrath. Mohan tries to excavate Dolli's dead body from the cemetery, but his unmanned car, apparently driven by Dolli's spirit, tries to kill him. Mohan escapes by entering a temple. He then pleads with the church to permit him to excavate the body and cremate it.

Back home, he locks Shalini inside a room and reveals all details to Bhuvana and asks her not to open the room. He gets a call from the pastor of the church, permitting him to excavate Dolli's body. He tries to leave for the cemetery, but supernatural things start to happen in the house and both Mohan and Bhuvana are tormented by Dolli's spirit. They finally lock themselves inside the prayer room to save themselves. Mohan leaves for the cemetery and his unmanned car chases him again. He finally reaches the cemetery where David confronts him. He listens to Mohan's story and agrees to cremate Dolli's body himself. Meanwhile, Dolli makes Bhuvana's clothes catch fire. Bhuvana jumps into a water tank to douse the fire, and Dolli tries to drown her. Mohan arrives to save her from drowning while David cremates Dolli's body. Dolli tries to kill Shalini before leaving her body, but Mohan and David save her.

== Cast ==
- Mohan as Mohan
- Radhika as Dolli
- Jaishankar as David
- Nalini as Bhuvana
- Baby Shalini as Shalini
- Sathyaraj as Saint Cromeo (guest appearance)
- Janagaraj as Dolli's secretary
- Thengai Srinivasan as Kanagasabapathy Principal
- Chinni Jayanth as Sekar
- Peeli Sivam
- Pasi Narayanan as Oomaithurai
- T.K.S. Chandran as Psychiatrist Doctor Deensha

== Production ==
After his directorial debut Agaya Gangai (1982) failed, Manobala did not get any further offers to direct which left him depressed and he contemplated suicide. P. Kalaimani approached Manobala to direct a film for him which was titled Muthal Vasantham; however the partners of Kalaimani were uninterested in having Manobala as director and replaced him with Manivannan. Despite this Kalaimani promised Manobala to direct a film which eventually became Pillai Nila.

The film took inspiration from various horror films such as Christine (1983), Poltergeist (1982), The Omen (1976) and The Exorcist (1973). The makers sought to avoid clichéd horror film tropes such as haunted houses, "sex-charged teenagers" and "unrealistic monsters in rubber masks".

== Soundtrack ==
The music was composed by Ilaiyaraaja. It took him six days to finish the film's re-recording.

Track listing
No.	Title	Lyrics	Singer(s)	Length
1.	"Raja Magal Roja Malar"	Vaali	P. Jayachandran and S. Janaki	4:20
2.	"Raja Magal Roja Malar" (female)	Vaali	S. Janaki	4:13
3.	"Azhage Azhage"	Vairamuthu	Malaysia Vasudevan and S. Janaki	2:10
4.	"Unnodu Thaan"	Vaali	S. Janaki	2:04
Total length:				12:47

== Release and reception ==
Pillai Nila was released on 14 April 1985, Puthandu. Despite facing competition from other films released in the same week including Mohan's own films Udaya Geetham and Deivapiravi, it emerged a commercial success. Jayamanmadhan (a duo) of Kalki wrote the first half was not so boring, but the second half did not test their patience at all. The duo praised Ashok Kumar's cinematography, the performances of Mohan, Nalini and Shalini but felt the climax was absurd.
