= Nooravathu Naal =

1985 film by Manivannan

- Poster
- Directed by: Manivannan
- Written by: Manivannan
- Produced by: S. N. S. Thirumal
- Starring: Vijayakanth; Mohan; Nalini
- Cinematography: A. Sabapathy
- Edited by: B. Kanthasamy
- Music by: Ilaiyaraaja
- Production company: Thirupathisamy Pictures
- Release date: 23 February 1984
- Running time: 134 minutes
- Country: India
- Language: Tamil

Nooravathu Naal (transl. The 100th Day) is a 1984 Indian Tamil-language mystery thriller film written and directed by Manivannan. The film stars Vijayakanth, Mohan and Nalini, with Thengai Srinivasan, Janagaraj, Sathyaraj and Y. Vijaya in supporting roles. It revolves around a woman who has premonitions of murders and seeks to stop them.

Nooravathu Naal is an unofficial adaptation of the 1977 Italian giallo film Sette note in nero. The film was released on 23 February 1984 and became a box office success. It was remade in Malayalam as Aayiram Kannukal (1986) and in Hindi as 100 Days (1991).

== Plot ==
Devi, a college student has a strange premonition one night of her sister being murdered. Her sister soon goes missing. After a few years, Devi meets and marries a rich businessman Ramkumar. Soon after, Devi has another vision of an unknown woman being murdered and seeks the help of her cousin Raju to help her save the possible victim. Raju is reluctant to believe her story but assists her anyway. Devi also finds a decomposed body in the bungalow where she lives with Ramkumar, which she believes is her sister's based on her previous vision. Devi and Raju's investigations lead them to the museum where Devi's sister worked and a strange man who tries to assassinate them. Whether Devi's strange premonitions are true and whether she and Raju are able to trap the mysterious killer forms the rest of the story.

== Cast ==
- Vijayakanth as Raju
- Mohan as Ramkumar
- Nalini as Devi
- Thengai Srinivasan as Ramanathan
- Janagaraj as John
- Sathyaraj as Jagannathan
- Y. Vijaya as Parvathi
- Kovai Sarala as Manju
- Sudha as Saroja
- E. Ramdoss as the museum assistant
- Kokila as Sarasu

== Production ==
Nooravathu Naal was directed by Manivannan and produced by S. N. S. Thirumal under Thirupathisamy Pictures, with cinematography by A. Sabapathy. Manivannan selected Sathyaraj to portray a negative role. For the character look, he sported a clean-shaven pate, wore sunglasses and a red jerkin. He completed filming his portions within five days.

== Soundtrack ==
The music was composed by Ilaiyaraaja. The song "Vizhiyile Mani Vizhiyil" was re-used from the song "Jotheyali Jothe Jotheyali" from the 1981 Kannada film Geetha. It is set in the Carnatic raga known as Kapi.

Track listing
No.	Title	Lyrics	Singer(s)	Length
1.	"Vizhiyile Mani"	Pulamaipithan	S. P. Balasubrahmanyam, S. Janaki	04:01
2.	"Ulagam Muzhuthum"	Vairamuthu	K. J. Yesudas, Vani Jairam	04:14
3.	"Uruguthey Idhayame"	Muthulingam	Vani Jairam	04:22
Total length:				12:37

== Release and reception ==
Nooravathu Naal was released on 23 February 1984, and ran for over 200 days in theatres. Jayamanmadhan of Kalki praised the acting of star cast and Ilaiyaraaja's music but felt the film lacked pep in certain places.

== Legacy ==
Sathyaraj's performance as a psychopathic killer received acclaim and made him popular among audiences. Nooravathu Naal became a milestone in Tamil cinema, with regards to "scene construction". The serial killers Auto Shankar and Jayaprakash were inspired by the film to commit murders. Sangeetha Devi Dundoo of The Hindu in her review of the Telugu film Tripura (2015) said that the idea of hiding corpses inside a wall is inspired from Nooravathu Naal. Following Vijayakanth's death in 2023, Film Companion included the film in their list "7 Vijayakanth Films That Left an Indian Cinema Legacy".

== Bibliography ==
- Rajadhyaksha, Ashish; Willemen, Paul (1998) [1994]. Encyclopaedia of Indian Cinema. British Film Institute and Oxford University Press. ISBN 0-19-563579-5.
- Sundararaman (2007) [2005]. Raga Chintamani: A Guide to Carnatic Ragas Through Tamil Film Music (2nd ed.). Chennai: Pichhamal Chintamani. OCLC 295034757.
