= Sathyaraj =

Indian actor, film producer and media personality (born 1954)

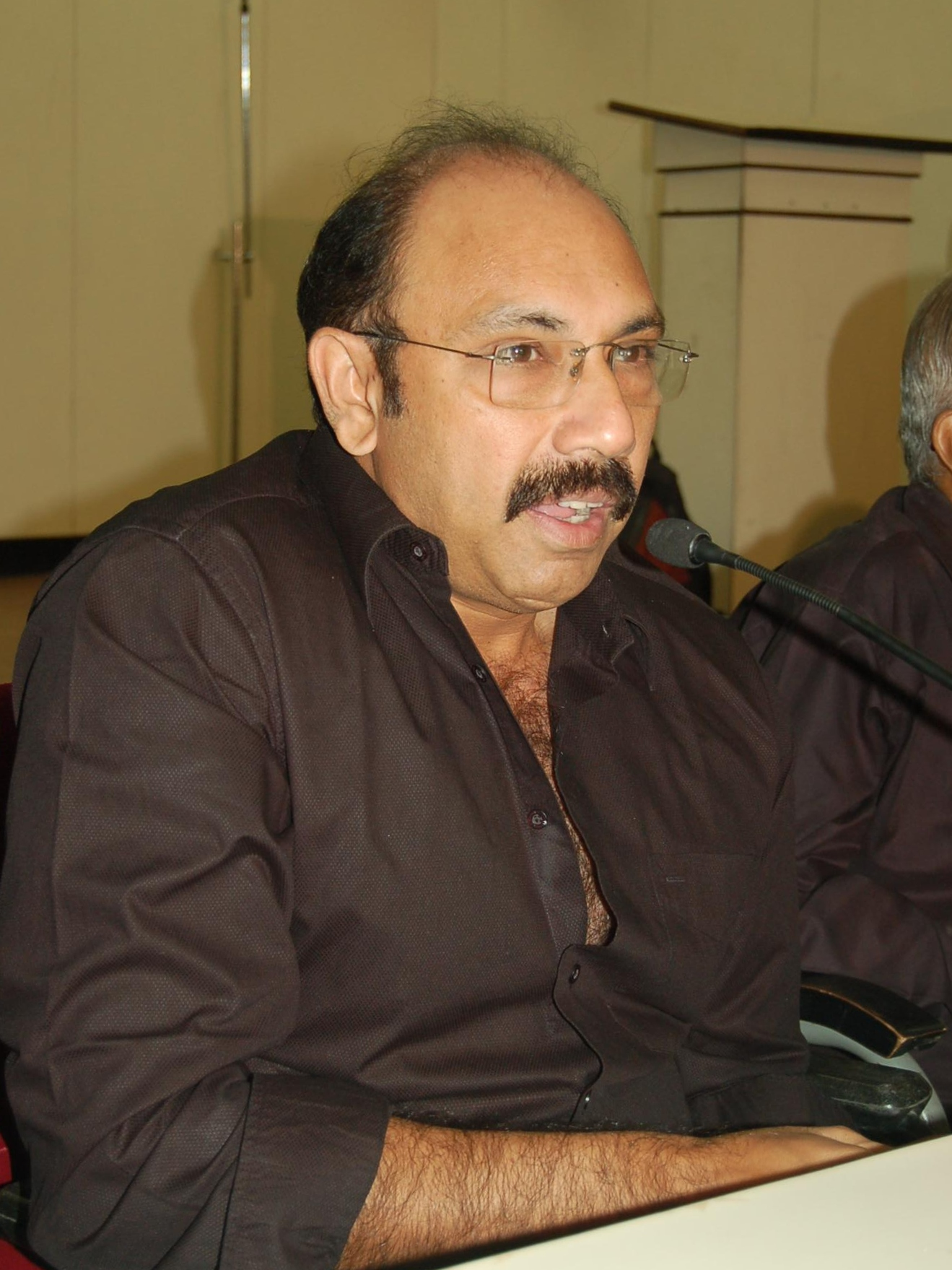
- Sathiyaraj at a press meeting in 2007
- Born: Rangaraj Subbiah; 3 October 1954 (age 72); Gandhipuram, Coimbatore, Madras State, India
- Occupations: Actor; Film producer; Film director; Media personality
- Years active: 1978–present
- Works: Full list
- Spouse: Maheshwari (m. 1979)
- Children: Divya; Sibiraj

Rangaraj Subbiah (born 3 October 1954), known professionally as Sathyaraj, is an Indian actor, film producer and media personality who appears predominantly in Tamil films. He also appears in works in Telugu, Hindi, Malayalam and Kannada. He has acted in more than 260 films. He is a recipient of three Filmfare Award South and three Tamil Nadu State Film Awards.

He started his career in antagonistic roles and later played lead roles. He met with success through lead performances in Vedham Pudhithu (1987), Nadigan (1990), Amaidhipadai (1994), Periyar (2007) and Onbadhu Roobai Nottu (2007). He also received acclaim for supporting roles in Nanban (2012), Raja Rani (2013), Baahubali (2015), Baahubali 2 (2017) and Kanaa (2018). He was also the director of the film Villadhi Villain (1995), starring himself in three different roles.

In 2011, he had a brief career as a television host for the game show Home Sweet Home on STAR Vijay. He has also served as a brand ambassador for Pothys, Susi Emu farms, and Kumaran jewellery shop.

== Early life ==
Sathyaraj was born as Rangaraj on 3 October 1954 to Subbiah, a doctor, and Nathambal, with two younger sisters, namely Kalpana and Roopa Senapathy. He is an ardent fan of M. G. Ramachandran and Hindi actor Rajesh Khanna. He belongs to the Kongu Vellalar Gounder community. Sathyaraj completed his primary school education from St. Mary's Convent school, Coimbatore and later studied for tenth standard at Suburban High School, Ramnagar, Coimbatore. He went to Government Arts College, Coimbatore, for a Bachelor of Science degree in botany.

Sathyaraj's dream was to become an actor, but his mother was against it and forbid him to join cinema. In 1976, in spite of his mother's opposition, he left Coimbatore to enter the Tamil film industry based in Kodambakkam, Chennai.

Sathyaraj entered the film industry after witnessing the shooting of the film Annakili, where he met actor Sivakumar and producer Thiruppur Manian and started pestering them to help him fulfill his cinematic ambitions. Sivakumar vehemently criticized his interest in acting and advised him to immediately return home. Nevertheless, he remained in Chennai. Producer Maathampatty Sivakumar supported him with sending money every month. He joined the drama troupe of Komal Swamynathan. Sathyaraj's first film in a credited role as an actor was Sattam En Kaiyil, in 1978, where he played a henchman to the main villain played by Thengai Srinivasan in the film. Later, he worked as production manager for the film Kannan Oru Kaikkuzhanthai.

In addition to his managerial role, he also had a small acting part in the film. His first film as the leading hero in Tamil was Saavi in 1985, which was a box office success. He acted in about 75 films from 1978 to 1985, most of which featured Sathyaraj in antagonist roles.

== Career ==
=== 1978–1985: Early career ===
In his early career (between 1978 and 1982), Sathyaraj often played antagonistic roles, typically as a henchman to main villains like M. N. Nambiar. His roles were minor, with leading actors such as Sivaji Ganesan, Jaishankar, Kamal Haasan, Rajinikanth, and Vijayakanth dominating the screen.

Sathyaraj's breakthrough came when his college friend, Manivannan, directed him in the Tamil film Nooravathu Naal (1984), where he had a supporting role. Manivannan went on to cast Sathyaraj in two other films that same year --24 Mani Neram and January 1—where he was the main villain.

His performances were widely noticed, earning him recognition among Tamil audiences. He further solidified his reputation in Kakki Sattai (1985), where he was again the principal antagonist.

1985 also marked a turning point in Sathyaraj's career. His first lead role came with Saavi (1985), a Tamil-language crime thriller written and directed by Karthik Raghunath. Saavi was significant as it marked Sathyaraj's debut as a protagonist, albeit in a character with negative shades.

=== 1986–1989: Lead roles ===
In Rasigan Oru Rasigai (1986), directed by Balu Anand, Sathyaraj made his debut as a hero with Ambika as his heroine. Next, in Kadalora Kavithaigal (1986), as Chinnappa Das, he played the lead romantic role and Behindwoods said: "Sathyaraj broke his image of an action hero and came up with a rollicking performance. He is the real star of the film." He received appreciation for playing his role in Mr. Bharath (1986), which revolved around the conflict between father, played by Sathyaraj and son (Rajinikanth). Sathyaraj acted as Rajinikanth's father in the film, though he was in fact 4 years younger than Rajinikanth. Manivannan, being friends with Sathyaraj, kept casting him in roles in his directorial ventures, regularly showcasing different emotions from Sathyaraj in films such as Muthal Vasantham, Palaivana Rojakkal and Vidinja Kalyanam.

After Kadalora Kavithaigal, Sathyaraj had box office hits as the lead hero between 1986 and 1988 such as Manthira Punnagai, Kadamai Kanniyam Kattupaadu, Poovizhi Vasalile, Makkal En Pakkam (in which he had dual roles), Annanagar Mudhal Theru, En Bommukutty Ammavukku and Chinnappadass. Manivanan from 1987 onward started casting Sathyaraj in positive roles and their combination had box office hits like Chinna Thambi Periya Thambi, Jallikattu, Ganam Courtar Avargale and Chinnappadas in this period. Sathyaraj received the Best Tamil Actor award in Filmfare Awards South for his performance in Vedham Pudhithu (1987).

Sathyaraj had established himself as a leading actor and in Chinna Thambi Periya Thambi, in which Prabhu and Sathyaraj were cast in the starring role, Prabhu's character played second fiddle to Sathyaraj's character. He played a bespectacled leading man in the commercially successful Ganam Courtaar Avargaley His 99th film was Dravidan and his 100th film was Vaathiyaar Veettu Pillai but the latter fared better at the box office.

=== 1990–1999: Breakthrough ===
In the 90s, he attempted more films of comedy and action genres and occasionally did romantic films. He had few unsuccessful films such as Madurai Veeran Enga Saami, Magudam and Pangali in this period as he became selective of choosing his roles as main lead hero. Many of them were commercially successful, such as Velai Kidaichuduchu, Nadigan, Pudhu Manithan, Rickshaw Mama, Walter Vetrivel, Udan Pirappu, Thai Maaman and Bramma. Sathyaraj played a dual role as father and son in the box office hit Amaithipadai, which is considered among his best performances. With regard to the film, he has stated: "I have no words for that film, as it took me to the next level as an actor". He also said that he almost did not sign up for the film as it was an antagonist character and he had moved away from antagonist roles and "gained some respectability" with films such as Poovizhi Vaasalile, Vedham Pudhidhu and Walter Vetrivel. After Thai Maaman became successful in 1994, the same team of Sathyaraj and director Guru Dhanapal decided to do their next venture Maaman Magal in 1995, which was also a moderate hit. He acted, produced and directed in his 125th film Villadhi Villain, which had him in three distinct roles and it was a successful project.

His pairing opposite actress Khushbu and Meena became popular in this decade. The box office hits of the pair Kushboo-Sathyaraj include Nadigan, Bramma, Rickshaw Mama, Kalyana Galatta, Suyamvaram and Malabar Police. The on-screen pair of Sathyaraj-Meena together had average grossers such as Thai Maaman, Maaman Magal and Vallal. His chemistry with actors Goundamani and Senthil has been well received and appreciated by the public and hence they have appeared in many movies together from Vaazhkai Chakkaram in 1990.

=== 2000–2009: Comedy and character roles ===
The year 2000 proved to be unsuccessful for Sathyaraj. 4 films between 2000 and 2001 Veeranadai, Puratchikkaaran, Aandan Adimai and the comedy film Looty were failures while his commercially successful films were Sundar C's Unnai Kann Theduthey, P. Vasu's comedy film Asathal and Suraj's Kunguma Pottu Gounder. As many new young actors such as Ajith Kumar, Vijay and Prashanth who debuted in the 1990s had established themselves successfully by 2000, and others such as R. Madhavan, Jiiva and Srikanth made their mark in the mid-2000s and also since Sathyaraj had been using wigs since 1985 in films as he had begun losing hair since then, critics felt Sathyaraj's career as solo lead actor may end by 2000.

Sathyaraj re-invented himself as a romantic hero with the 2002 film Vivaramana Aalu, as a hero Maaran and with his performance in the comedy film Aalukkoru Aasai in 2003. Sathyaraj and director Sakthi Chidambaram's combination gave 3 consecutive films, Ennamma Kannu, Maha Nadigan and Englishkaran. His 2004 film Sema Ragalai opposite Devayani was a hit at box office.

Few films like Ramachandra, Sena and Azhagesan received negative reviews in this decade. He co-starred with his son Sibiraj for the first time in Jore which was average. Bizhat described "It's interesting to watch the father – son combination together in Jore." Sathyaraj then acted with his son in 3 more films Mannin Maindhan (2005), Vetrivel Sakthivel (2006) and Kovai Brothers (2006), in which the two were seen as brothers and these were commercially successful. In 2007, he produced a Tamil film Lee, starring his son .

Other Films in the 2000s with Sathyaraj in the lead role that fared well at the box office were 6'2, Vanakkam Thalaiva, Kurukshetram, Adavadi, Periyar and Thangam. He received the Vijay Award for Best Actor for Onbadhu Roobai Nottu in 2007 and was also nominated for his performance in Periyar in the same year, in which he portrayed the life of social reformer and rationalist Periyar E. V. Ramasamy. About the role he said, "I myself being a rationalist, I found it easy to portray his character on screen. His principles and ideologies, like fighting for women's liberation and untouchability, have influenced me to a great extent". Sathyaraj has played the protagonist father in the Telugu film Sankham (2009).

=== 2010–present: Supporting and matured roles ===
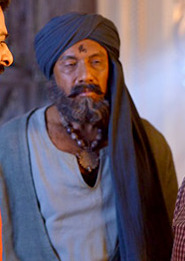
Sathyaraj portraying his role Kattappa on the sets of Baahubali: The Conclusion (2017)

In the early 2010s, he accepted supporting roles in films such as Aagathan, Guru Sishyan, Aayiram Vilakku, Uchithanai Muharnthaal, Nanban, Thalaivaa and Raja Rani. In Nanban, he played a college professor and won the Best Supporting Actor awards at the Filmfare, Vijay and SIIMA ceremonies, while in Thalaivaa, Raja Rani, Mirchi (Telugu) and Chennai Express (Hindi) he played father characters. Sathyaraj and Manivannan worked together for the last time in Nagaraja Cholan MA, MLA, which was Manivannan's 50th and last directorial venture before his death. A sequel to Amaidhipadai, it was also the 200th film of Sathyaraj and became a box office bomb.

He also entered Malayalam cinema with Aagathan in 2009. He played the role of Kattappa in the Baahubali (2015–2017) duology.

In 2015, at the age of 60, the media and public at large rechristened him as Kattappa, as he received nationwide popularity for his role in India's biggest motion picture Baahubali: The Beginning. Since the time he made his debut as junior artiste at 24 years of age, he had been wanting to do a historical or a folklore film and it was his long cherished dream. He quoted in an interview in 2015: "I am a great fan of M.G.R who is popular in folklore films, like NTR in Telugu movies. My dream of doing a folklore at 24 has been realised at 60 through Rajamouli. I played Rajinikanth's father when I was 31 and Rajini was 35, so I never cared for age..it never mattered to me."

He acted as lead role in the film Oru Naal Iravil (2015). A faithful remake of much acclaimed Malayalam movie, Shutter has been helmed by editor turned director, Antony with great integrity. Sathyaraj as the middle aged man brings so much life to his character. In 2016, he acted with his son Sibiraj in Jackson Durai, another addition to the popular "Horror-comedy genre". He played the role of DC Ratnavel "Randy", a Police officer in the film Mersal (2017) directed by Atlee. Sathyaraj won the Best Supporting Actor – Tamil for the movie Kanaa (2018). The following year, he subsequently starred in films like Jersey, Prati Roju Pandage and Thambi.

In 2021, he appears in Tughlaq Durbar, inspired by Manivannan's political satire Amaidhi Padai. Then Ponram's, MGR Magan which has Sathyaraj and Sasikumar starring. In Theerpugal Virkapadum, he plays the role of a dad who seeks revenge for the injustice meted out to his daughter. In 2022, he had nine releases with notably Etharkkum Thunindhavan, Veetla Vishesham and Love Today which received positive reviews. He also starred in the Telugu anthology drama series Meet Cute streaming on SonyLIV. In December, the horror thriller Connect was released where sathyaraj played the role of Nayanthara's father. They also come together in Annapoorani: The Goddess of Food (2023). He later appeared as a lead actor in Weapon (2024), Thozhar CheGuevara (2024) and Madras Matinee (2025). Sathyaraj and Rajinikanth will reunite after 38 years for Lokesh Kanagaraj's Coolie (2025). They last acted together in the 1986 film, Mr. Bharath.

== Personal life ==
In 1979, Sathyaraj married Maheswari, niece of producer Madhampatti Sivakumar, and had two children, daughter Divya and son Sibiraj, also an actor. Sathyaraj is a staunch atheist.

Sathyaraj and Manivannan shared a close friendship since college and became frequent collaborators in films in Tamil cinema. The Hindu wrote: "His (Manivannan's) friendship with actor Sathiyaraj translated to several memorable moments on screen. Manivannan...along with Sathyaraj epitomised on screen what is colloquially known in Tamil as "nakkal" (snideness)". According to Behindwoods.com, Manivannan (as the director) and Sathyaraj had consecutive hit films together beginning from 1987 to 1994; Chinna Thambi Periya Thambi, Ganam Courtar Avargale, Jallikattu, Vaazhkai Chakkaram, Pudhu Manithan, Therku Theru Machan and Amaidhi Padai. About working with Manivannan, he has said that it "is a pleasure. There's no script, no dialogue sheet. It's all in his head. But, he extracts great performances". Sathyaraj and Manivannan also acted together in several films directed by other directors. About his personal relationship with Manivannan, Sathyaraj remarked "I still reminisce about the beautiful moments that I had with...Manivannan, a genius of a person. In fact, he is the one who taught me many things in life, and changed me, I became a good human from being just an actor. Every day, we used to have conversations over the phone on a wide range of topics. It was a 30-year relationship. No one could understand me the way he did". Manivannan died in 2013 and Sathyaraj has said that just 24 hours before his death they had discussed their next project and that he narrated him a story.

== Awards and nominations ==
=== Honours ===
List of honours awarded to Sathyaraj
Year	Nominee / work	Award	Result
1991	Kalaimamani	Government of Tamil Nadu	Won
1995	Tamil Nadu State Film Honorary Award (MGR Award)	Tamil Nadu State Film Awards	Won
2000	Honorary Doctorate	Sathyabama University	Won
2011	Kalaichchigaram Award	Norway Tamil Film Festival Awards	Won
2017	Honorary Doctorate	Vels University	Won

=== Awards ===
List of awards and nominations received by Sathyaraj
Year	Category	Award	Film	Result
1987	Filmfare Award for Best Actor – Tamil	Filmfare Awards South	Vedham Pudhithu	Won
1988	Filmfare Award for Best Actor – Tamil	Filmfare Awards South	En Bommukutty Ammavukku	Nominated
1990	Filmfare Award for Best Actor – Tamil	Filmfare Awards South	Nadigan	Nominated
1990	Tamil Nadu State Film Award Special Prize	Tamil Nadu State Film Awards	Nadigan	Won
1993	Cinema Express Award for Best Actor – Tamil	Cinema Express Awards	Walter Vetrivel	Won
2007	Tamil Nadu State Film Award Special Prize	Tamil Nadu State Film Awards	Periyar	Won
2007	Periyar Award	Government of Tamil Nadu	Periyar	Won
2007	Best Actor	Ananda Vikatan Cinema Awards	Periyar	Won
2007	Filmfare Award for Best Actor – Tamil	Filmfare Awards South	Onbadhu Roobai Nottu	Nominated
2007	Vijay Award for Best Actor	Vijay Awards	Onbadhu Roobai Nottu	Won
2012	Vijay Award for Best Supporting Actor	Vijay Awards	Nanban	Won
2012	Filmfare Award for Best Supporting Actor – Tamil	Filmfare Awards South	Nanban	Nominated
2012	Best Actor in a Supporting Role	South Indian International Movie Awards	Nanban	Nominated
2013	Best Actor in a Supporting Role	South Indian International Movie Awards	Varuthapadatha Valibar Sangam	Nominated
2013	SIIMA Award for Best Supporting Actor – Telugu	South Indian International Movie Awards	Mirchi	Nominated
2013	Filmfare Award for Best Supporting Actor – Tamil	Filmfare Awards South	Raja Rani	Won
2015	Filmfare Award for Best Supporting Actor – Telugu	Filmfare Awards South	Baahubali: The Beginning	Nominated
2015	SIIMA Award for Best Supporting Actor (Telugu)	South Indian International Movie Awards	Baahubali: The Beginning	Nominated
2015	Best Actor in a Supporting Role – Telugu	1st IIFA Utsavam	Baahubali: The Beginning	Nominated
2015	Performance in a Supporting Role – Tamil	1st IIFA Utsavam	Baahubali: The Beginning	Won
2015	Best Supporting Actor	Ananda Vikatan Cinema Awards	Baahubali: The Beginning	Won
2016	Filmfare Award for Best Supporting Actor – Telugu	Filmfare Awards South	Nenu Sailaja	Nominated
2017	Filmfare Award for Best Supporting Actor – Telugu	Filmfare Awards South	Baahubali 2: The Conclusion	Nominated
2017	Best Supporting Actor – Telugu	South Indian International Movie Awards	Baahubali 2: The Conclusion	Nominated
2017	Best Supporting Actor	Ananda Vikatan Cinema Awards	Baahubali 2: The Conclusion	Won
2018	Filmfare Award for Best Supporting Actor – Tamil	Filmfare Awards South	Kanaa	Won
2018	Best Supporting Actor	South Indian International Movie Awards	Kanaa	Nominated
2019	Best Supporting Actor	South Indian International Movie Awards	Thambi	Nominated
