= Manivannan filmography =

Manivannan (31 July 1954 – 15 June 2013) was an Indian actor, film director and screenwriter known for his work in Tamil cinema. In a career spanning three decades, he went from being a story and dialogue writer for director Bharathiraja from 1980–82 to a successful director who throve in experimenting with different genres, before becoming an actor. With over 400 films to his name, Manivannan was one of the most experienced actors in the field and directed exactly 50 films. Manivannan was mainly a supporting actor in films and often played the comedian, supporting character and villain roles.

The following is Manivannan's filmography as a director, script and dialogue writer and as actor. Manivannan acted in over 400 films and directed 50 films during his career.

== As writer ==
- Note: all films are in Tamil, unless otherwise noted.

Year	Film	Writer	Notes
1980	Nizhalgal	Story	
1981	Alaigal Oivathillai	Story	
1981	Seethakoka Chilaka	Story	Telugu film
1982	Aagaya Gangai	Story	
1982	Kaadhal Oviyam	Dialogues	
1982	Lottery Ticket	Story, dialogues	
1997	Nesam	Dialogues	

== As director ==
Year	Film	Language	Notes			
Year	Film	Language	Notes	1982	Gopurangal Saivathillai	Tamil
1983	Jothi					Tamil
1983	Veetula Raman Veliyila Krishnan					Tamil
1983	Ilamai Kaalangal					Tamil
1984	Kuva Kuva Vaathugal					Tamil
1984	Nooravathu Naal					Tamil
1984	Ingeyum Oru Gangai					Tamil
1984	Ambigai Neril Vanthaal					Tamil
1984	24 Mani Neram					Tamil
1984	January 1					Tamil
1985	Anbin Mugavari					Tamil
1985	Khooni	Telugu				
1985	Darja Donga	Telugu	Dubbed in Tamil as Marma Manithan			
1986	Muthal Vasantham	Tamil				
1986	Vidinja Kalyanam	Tamil				
1986	Palaivana Rojakkal	Tamil				
1987	Chinna Thambi Periya Thambi	Tamil				
1987	Ini Oru Sudhanthiram	Tamil				
1987	Jallikattu	Tamil				
1987	Kalyana Kacheri	Tamil				
1987	Puyal Paadum Paattu	Tamil				
1987	Theertha Karaiyinile	Tamil				
1988	Ullathil Nalla Ullam	Tamil				
1988	Ganam Courtar Avargale	Tamil				
1989	Gopala Rao Gari Abbayi	Telugu				
1989	Hum Bhi Insaan Hain	Hindi				
1989	Manidhan Marivittan	Tamil				
1990	Vaazhkai Chakkaram	Tamil				
1990	Sandhana Kaatru	Tamil				
1991	Pudhu Manithan	Tamil				
1992	Therku Theru Machan	Tamil				
1992	Government Mappillai	Tamil				
1992	Agreement	Telugu	Dubbed in Tamil as Idhayam Ullavan			
1993	Moondravadhu Kann	Tamil				
1994	Amaidhi Padai	Tamil				
1994	Rasa Magan	Tamil				
1994	Thozhar Pandian	Tamil				
1994	Veera Padhakkam	Tamil				
1995	Gangai Karai Paattu	Tamil				
2001	Aandan Adimai	Tamil				
2013	Nagaraja Cholan MA, MLA	Tamil				

== As actor ==
=== 1980s ===
Year	Title	Role	Notes
1980	Kallukkul Eeram	Assistant director	Uncredited role; also assistant director
1980	Nizhalgal		
1982	Ragabanthangal		
1988	Kodi Parakuthu	G.D.	
1989	Manidhan Marivittan		

=== 1990s ===
Year	Title	Role	Notes
1990	Vazhkai Chakkaram		
1991	Pudhu Manithan		
1991	Sirai Kadhavugal		
1992	Government Mappillai		
1992	Agreement	David	
1994	Amaidhi Padai	Manimaran	
1994	Rasa Magan	Aandai	
1994	Thozhar Pandian		
1994	Thai Maaman	Paramasivan	
1994	Veera Padhakkam	Palanisamy	
1995	Gangai Karai Paattu	Stephen Anthony Raj	
1995	Deva	Mayilsamy	Tamil Nadu State Film Award for Best Comedian
1995	Thondan	Minister	
1995	Aanazhagan		
1995	Rani Maharani		
1995	Villadhi Villain	MLA Kuppusamy	
1995	Murai Mappillai	Kai Ezhuthu Gounder	
1995	Maaman Magal	Manikkam	
1996	Ullathai Allitha	Vishwanathan; Kasinathan	
1996	Thirumbi Paar	Chokku	
1996	Amman Kovil Vaasalile		
1996	Kalloori Vaasal	Kumarasamy, Pooja's Father	
1996	Maanbumigu Maanavan	Killadi Krishnaswamy	
1996	Aavathum Pennale Azhivathum Pennale	Sivalingam	
1996	Kadhal Kottai	Kaliyaperumal	
1996	Tamizh Selvan	Vedimuthu	
1996	Vishwanath	Narayanan	
1996	Mettukudi	Kumarasamy	
1996	Manikkam		
1996	Subash	Thangamani	
1996	Parivattam		
1996	Tata Birla	Ramanathan	
1996	Nethaji	Mani	
1996	Gokulathil Seethai	Rishi's father	
1996	Avvai Shanmughi	Mudaliar	
1996	Senathipathi	Nagappan	
1996	Gopala Gopala	Gopalakrishnan's father	
1996	Poomani	Veerappan	
1996	Purushan Pondatti	Velmurugan	
1996	Kranthi	Veerappan	Telugu film
1996	Selva	Selva's friend	
1997	Kaalamellam Kaathiruppen	Broker	
1997	Dharma Chakkaram	Vellaichamy	
1997	Nesam	Muthuvel Arunachalam	
1997	Pudhayal		
1997	Kaalamellam Kadhal Vaazhga	Nayar	
1997	Ettupatti Rasa	Marimuthu	
1997	Vallal	Virumaandi	
1997	Sishya	Police inspector Malachamy	
1997	Pistha	Kesavan	
1997	Suryavamsam	Rasappa	
1997	Nattupura Nayagan		
1997	Once More	Ashok	
1997	V.I.P	Nizam Bhai	
1997	Nandhini	Karupatti Kandhasamy	
1997	Periya Idathu Mappillai	Manian Gounder	
1997	Nerukku Ner	Sundaram	
1997	Porkaalam	Ramaiya	
1997	Periya Manushan	Johnson	
1997	Kadavul	God	
1997	Janakiraman	Kumarasaamy	
1997	Vidukathai		Tamil Nadu State Film Award for Best Comedian
1997	Kadhalukku Mariyadhai	Kesavan's father	
1998	Kaadhale Nimmadhi	Velayudham	
1998	Naam Iruvar Namakku Iruvar	Mani	
1998	Udhavikku Varalaamaa	Mythili's father	
1998	Dhinamdhorum	M.L.A Kesavamoorthy	
1998	Swarnamukhi	Varadarajan	
1998	Color Kanavugal		
1998	Veera Thalattu		
1998	Ninaithen Vandhai	Gopalakrishnan Gounder	
1998	Priyamudan	House owner	
1998	Sandhippoma		
1998	Poonthottam	Mani	
1998	Kalyana Galatta		
1998	Nilaave Vaa	Dubai	
1998	En Aasai Rasave		
1998	Ellame En Pondattithaan	Disctrict Secretary Sundarapandian	
1998	Aasai Thambi		
1998	Unnudan	Santhosh's uncle	
1998	Veeram Vilanja Mannu	Manikandan	
1998	Desiya Geetham	Indian	
1998	Gurupaarvai	Nagarajan	
1998	Kannathal	Mohana Sundaram	
1998	Kadhal Kavithai	Vishwa's father	
1999	Thodarum		
1999	Thullatha Manamum Thullum	Mani	
1999	Kallazhagar	Mani	
1999	Chinna Durai		
1999	Annan	Rasappan	
1999	Padayappa	Ramalingam	
1999	Periyanna		
1999	Poomaname Vaa		
1999	Nilave Mugam Kaattu	Chidambaram	
1999	Poomagal Oorvalam	Chidambaram	
1999	Chinna Raja	Mani	
1999	Rajasthan	Cook	
1999	Anantha Poongatre	Zamindar Rajadurai	
1999	Nenjinile	Mani	
1999	Oruvan		
1999	Kadhalar Dhinam	Manivannan	
1999	Sangamam	Aavudapillai	
1999	Kannodu Kanbathellam	Madana Gopal	
1999	Minsara Kanna	Devanathan	
1999	Mugham	Muthannan	
1999	Simmaraasi		
1999	Mudhalvan	Chief Secretary Maya Krishnan	
1999	Hello	Flower Shop Owner	
1999	Pudhu Kudithanam	Gokulakrishnan	
1999	Pattali	Mani	

=== 2000s ===
Year	Title	Role	Notes
2000	Mugavaree	CD Shop Owner	
2000	Sandhitha Velai		
2000	Kandukondain Kandukondain	Sivagnanam	
2000	Unnai Kodu Ennai Tharuven	Subramaniyam Singh	
2000	Maayi	Rajavelu	
2000	Budget Padmanabhan	Varadharajan	
2000	Rhythm	Karthik's colleague	
2000	Vaanavil	Ramasamy	
2000	Pottu Amman		
2000	Penngal	Sodalai	
2000	Ennavalle	Subramani	
2001	Nila Kaalam		Television film
2001	Engalukkum Kaalam Varum	Mannangatti	
2001	Piriyadha Varam Vendum	Dhaadi	
2001	Dumm Dumm Dumm	Sivaji	
2001	Asathal	Lawyer	
2001	Sonnal Thaan Kaadhala	Roja's father	
2001	Lovely	Mahadevan	
2001	Kabadi Kabadi	Ayyavannan	
2001	Mitta Miraasu		
2001	Paarthale Paravasam	Nellai Amaran	
2001	Kasi	Irulaandi	
2001	Azhagana Naatkal	Rajasekhar	
2002	Red	Narayanan	
2002	Pammal K. Sambandam	Rajeshwari's father	
2002	Phantom	Varadaraja Perumal	Malayalam film
2002	Raajjiyam		
2002	Panchathanthiram	Diamond-smuggling boss	
2002	Guruvamma		
2002	Youth	Sandhya's father	
2002	Kubusam		Telugu film
2002	En Mana Vaanil	Annamalai	
2003	Vaseegara	Mani	
2003	Anbe Anbe	Mahendra Bhoopathy's son-in-law's brother	
2003	Parthiban Kanavu	Sathya's father	
2003	Priyamana Thozhi	Peter	
2003	Kadhal Kisu Kisu	Sriram's father	
2003	Alaudin	Chinnasamy	
2003	Anjaneya	Paramaguru's neighbour	
2003	Enakku 20 Unakku 18	Preeti's Father	
2004	Engal Anna	SP's uncle	
2004	New	Scientist aka Science	
2004	Sullan	Mani	
2004	Arasatchi	Hotel Receptionist	
2004	Gomathi Nayagam	Nanjappan	
2005	Ayodhya	Sabapathy	
2005	Ji	Kaasi	
2005	London	Bhaskharan	
2005	Arputha Theevu	Maharaja	Tamil Version
2005	Padhavi Paduthum Paadu	Marudhanayagam	
2005	Majaa	Govindan	
2006	Aathi	Mani	
2006	Kodambakkam	Ramasamy Gounder	
2006	Thambi	Podhuvudamai	
2006	Something Something... Unakkum Enakkum	JP	
2006	Dharmapuri	Mokkaiyan	
2006	Rendu	Exhibition Grounds owner	
2006	Sivappathigaram	Sathyamoorthy's father	
2007	Mudhal Kanave	Hariharan	
2007	Nee Naan Nila	Chellappa	
2007	Sivaji	Arumugam	
2007	Cheena Thaana 001	Inspector Parameshwaran	
2007	Nam Naadu	Purushothaman	
2007	Rameswaram	Jeevan's grandfather	
2007	Puli Varudhu	Ramesh's father	
2008	Thodakkam		
2008	Sadhu Miranda	Bank Manager	
2008	Nenjathai Killadhe	Vasanth's father	
2008	Kuruvi	Singamuthu	
2008	Aayutham Seivom	VBR	
2008	Raman Thediya Seethai	Manikkavel	
2008	Ellam Avan Seyal	Veeramani	
2008	Bommalattam	Village Chief	
2009	Mayandi Kudumbathar	Mayandi	
2009	Innoruvan	Sadhasivam	
2009	Naalai Namadhe	Mani	
2009	Vaalmiki		

=== 2010s ===
Year	Title	Role	Notes
2010	Pollachi Mappillai	Manju	
2010	Thillalangadi	Ashram Staff	
2011	Ilaignan	Laborer	
2011	Sadhurangam	MD	Delayed release; Filmed in 2003-06
2011	Velayudham	Rathnavelu	
2013	Naan Rajavaga Pogiren	Kamaraj	
2013	Nagaraja Cholan MA, MLA	Manimaran	Last film
2014	Ninaithathu Yaaro	Himself	Guest appearance; posthumous film
2014	Sooran		Posthumous film

=== 2020s ===
Year	Title	Role	Notes
2025	Madha Gaja Raja	Auto driver	Posthumous film; Delayed release; Filmed in 2012

== Voice artist ==
Year	Title	For	Notes
1999	Shanmuga Pandian	Kota Srinivasa Rao	Dubbed version of Telugu film Samarasimha Reddy

== Television ==
- Ganga Yamuna Saraswati (Raj TV)
- Thirumagal (Kalaignar TV)
- Namma Kudumbam (Kalaignar TV)

== Discography ==
=== Playback singer ===
Year	Title	Song	Composer	Notes
1996	Poomani	"Eduthu Viduda Mappillai"	Ilayaraja	
1997	Nandhini	"Maanoothu Odaiyila"	Sirpy	
1997	Ettupatti Raasa	"Karikalai Puttukittu", "Lovapazham"	Deva	
