= Kalanjiyam =

Indian film director

- Born: 27 September 1971 (age 55); Therkkukottai, Tamil Nadu, India
- Occupation: Film director
- Years active: 1996–present

Mu. Kalanjiyam is an Indian film director who has made Tamil films. A winner of the Tamil Nadu State Film Award for Best Story Writer, Kalanjiyam has also featured in the lead role in his films.

== Career ==
Kalanjiyam's first film, Poomani (1996), featuring Murali and Devayani, won commercial and critical acclaim, and the director won the Tamil Nadu State Film Award for Best Story Writer for 1996. His next venture, the rural drama Kizhakkum Merkkum, starring Napoleon with Devayani, also won positive reviews. A proposed film titled Sangeetha Thirunaal, produced by music composer Ilaiyaraaja, was planned, but did not materialize. He returned with another film, Poonthottam (1998), with the cast of his first film, but the film went unnoticed as a result of the bigger budget films released around the same time. He then made Nilave Mugam Kaattu (1999), starring Karthik and Devayani, which became his fourth consecutive film with the actress, though the film was panned by critics who cited that the director "disappoints with this well-worn tale of friends sacrificing love for friendship." Kalanjiyam later started other eventually shelved films titled Vikadan, with Murali again, and Kesavan, with Sarathkumar and Rambha, before going on to make the Prabhu-starrer Mitta Miraasu in 2001.

In 2002, the director resurfaced with a project titled Sathamintri Muthamidu, which was set to be the launch for actor Mayur, Devayani's younger brother, and actress Anjali, though the film later failed to materialize. He also began two other films with Anjali, Valiba Desam and En Kanavu Thaanadi, though those also failed to materialize. In 2010, following actress Anjali's rise to fame, she made a goodwill gesture by agreeing to be a part of a few of Kalanjiyam's future films, noting she considered him her mentor. The director returned with his next film, Karungali in 2011, which saw himself play the lead role of a drug peddler alongside an ensemble cast including Anjali, Sunitha Varma and Asmitha. The film opened to unanimously poor reviews, with a critic noting that the film was a "crude affair", citing that the "subject in question is too heavy and has been handled in an insensitive way, making the film come across as a cheap sex thriller." The film was later dubbed and released in Telugu as Sathi Leelavathi, with the director crediting himself under the name Prabhakaran.

In 2013, it was reported that he was working on another project, titled Oor Suttri Puranam, with Anjali again, with the actress suffering a freak accident on the set of the film. In a turn of events, Anjali filed charges against the filmmaker, noting he had been advising her step-mother on various issues and she feared that she was being harassed by him. The film has since been stalled, and Kalanjiyam subsequently sought an industry-wide ban against the actress for failing to complete the film. In 2014, he worked as an actor in Kathiravan's Kodai Mazhai and landed in trouble for slapping actress Sri Priyanka during the making of the film, prompting her to faint on location. He was injured in an accident in August 2014, when a car he was traveling in toppled in Andhra Pradesh, killing another passenger.

== Filmography ==
- All films are in Tamil.

As director

Year	Film	Notes
1996	Poomani	Tamil Nadu State Film Award for Best Story Writer
1998	Kizhakkum Merkkum	Tamil Nadu State Film Award for Best Film Portraying Woman in Good Light
1998	Poonthottam	
1999	Nilave Mugam Kaattu	
2001	Mitta Miraasu	
2011	Karungali	
2019	Munthirikkaadu	

As actor

Year	Title	Role	Notes
2011	Karungali	Pottalam Ravi	
2016	Kathiravanin Kodai Mazhai		
2017	Kalavu Thozhirchalai	Irfan	
