= Poonthottam =

- VCD cover
- Directed by: Kalanjiyam
- Written by: Kalanjiyam
- Produced by: M. Kajamydeen; V. Gnanavel; V. Jayaprakash
- Starring: Murali; Devayani
- Cinematography: R. M. Ramnath Shetty
- Edited by: B. Lenin; V. T. Vijayan
- Music by: Ilaiyaraaja
- Production company: Roja Combines
- Release date: 10 July 1998
- Running time: 156 minutes
- Country: India
- Language: Tamil

Poonthottam (transl. Garden of flowers) is a 1998 Indian Tamil-language drama film directed by Kalanjiyam. The film stars Murali and Devayani, while Raghuvaran, Manivannan and Vijayalakshmi play other supporting roles. It was released on 10 July 1998.

== Plot ==
A woman faces threats from her step-brothers who are keen to evict her from their home. Meanwhile, her good for nothing tenant is another problem. But, it is the same tenant who comes to their rescue.

== Cast ==
- Murali as Moorthy
- Devayani as Sundari
- Raghuvaran as Panneerselvam "Panneer"
- Manivannan as Mani
- Vadivelu as Auto driver
- M. N. Nambiar as Sundari's grandfather
- Manorama as Sundari's grandmother
- Vijayalakshmi as Sumathi
- Thalaivasal Vijay
- Vennira Aadai Moorthy
- Vijay Adhiraj as Suresh
- Santhana Bharathi as Suresh's father
- Vichithra as Guest appearance
- Crane Manohar as Guest appearance
- Nassar as Guest appearance
- Ambika as Guest appearance
- Vadivukkarasi as Guest appearance

== Production ==
Director Kalanjiyam chose to re-collaborate with actors Murali and Devayani, who he had worked with in his first film Poomani (1996). Chaplin Balu was initially signed to shoot for the film for ten days but was removed from the film by Vadivelu, who had asked the film crew to write down the names of prominent actors in the film and Balu's name wasn't present.

== Soundtrack ==
Soundtrack was composed by Ilaiyaraaja.

Song	Singers	Lyrics
"Vennilavukku Aasai"	Ilaiyaraaja	Vaasan
"Vaanathu Tharagaiyo	Hariharan	Vaasan
"Vaanathil Irunthu"	Ilaiyaraaja	Vaasan
"Ponnumani"	Mano, Gangai Amaran, Vadivelu	Vaasan
"Meetatha Oru Veenai"	Hariharan, Mahalakshmi Iyer	Mu. Metha
"Iniya Malargal"	Ilaiyaraaja	Arivumathi
"New Year"	Karthik Raja, Yuvan Shankar Raja, Venkat Prabhu, Premji Amaran, Mano, Bhavatharini, Malaysia Vasudevan	Vaasan

== Reception ==
D. S. Ramanujam of The Hindu wrote, "Director M. Kalanjiyam and hero Murali lead the charge, the former with his sensitive approach and delicate handling of the situations and the latter, riding a success wave, consolidating his position with a mature portrayal, the emotional segments revealing his class". Ji of Kalki praised Murali's acting, Ilaiyaraaja's music and the cinematography but panned the acting of Devayani and Manivannan, felt Raghuvaran was wasted and Devayani's sister character was unneeded and concluded calling it a beautiful flower, even if the unnecessary things stick out here and there.
