= Kaiyalavu Manasu =

Kaiyalavu Manasu is a Tamil-language sitcom directed and produced by K. Balachander under the banner of Min Bimbangal. The series talks about the travails of a young woman. It was released in 1994 on Sun TV for a single season and had 55 episodes.

== Plot ==
Episode	Synopsis
1	We are introduced to Saradha, her husband Senthil Kumar (a construction supervisor) and their 3 children - Jawahar, Vani and Selvi - a middle class family living in 1979 Madras (Chennai). Manjula and her jobless husband Manavalan are their neighbors. Retired lawyer Pandurangan is Krishnan's father. Manjula keeps trying unsuccessfully to sell a life insurance policy to Senthil. Kanchana, a prostitute, moves newly to the neighborhood.
2	Saradha becomes pregnant with their 4th child. But Senthil is not happy about it because their financial situation. He suggests Saradha to abort the pregnancy, but she refuses
3	Kanchana befriends Saradha's kids, but Saradha is not happy about her kids interacting with a prostitute
4	Kanchana and Saradha see the same gynecologist. Kanchana learns she has a tumor in her uterus, and has to undergo a hysterectomy.
5	Kanchana makes multiple unsuccessful attempts to befriend Saradha. Senthil Kumar falls down from the top of a building under construction and dies.
6	Senthil Kumar's brother and sister-in-law try to force Saradha to part with some of Senthil's belongings.
7	Senthil's debtors come to Saradha asking her to pay back her husband's debts, plunging her to deep financial troubles. She ends up aborting her pregnancy.
8	Kanchana, who cannot get pregnant, wants to adopt one of Saradha's kids, but Saradha rejects the offer. Pandurangan helps Saradha to get a job as a sales person in a clothing store.
9	Saradha falls from a stool and injures herself seriously at work. Her doctor tells Manjula and Manavalan that Saradha has a heart complication and needs an expensive surgery. Manavalan spills the beans to Saradha.
10	Manjula and Manavalan suspect Pandurangan has an affair with someone.
11	Saradha's continued financial problems lead to her giving away Jawahar as an adopted child to a rich family. Pandurangan reveals to Manjula and Manavalan that he has decided to get remarried.
12	Manavalan's family doctor Bhadran tells him that he saw Pandurangan with a young woman at a movie theater. He also says the woman's is a writer and her name is Amirthavalli. Manavalan. He finds out the whereabouts of writer Amirthavalli and confronts her, but gets beaten up by her husband. Saradha finally warms up to Kanchana. She also meets with astrologer Parandhaman, who gives her some hope.
13	Pandurangan wants the house to himself and asks Manavalan and his family to vacate the house within 3 months. Vani and Selvi meet Jawahar at his rich foster parents' house and are completely impressed with his lifestyle. Astrologer Parandhaman connects Saradha with another rich family, who want to adopt Vani, but Vani refuses at the last minute.
14	Pandurangan decides to sell his house and Manavalan poses as a realtor and brings a prospective tenant, but Manjula drives them away. She also convinces Vani to accept the adoption proposal.
15	Kanchana again offers to adopt Selvi, but Saradha rejects the offer again and insults Kanchana. Manjula discovers a photo of a young woman on Pandurangan's desk, and assumes the lady in the photo is his girlfriend. Kanchana pays off one of Saradha's debts and Saradha repents for her behavior and accepts her proposal to adopt Selvi, her last child.
16	Kanchana adopts Selvi and Saradha finds it hard to adjust to a lonely life
17	The 3-month grace period ends and Pandurangan asks Manjula and Manavalan to leave the house. Manavalan says he found a job as an ambulance driver and is ready to vacate. Pandurangan reveals the 3-month deadline and his wedding plan were just a trick to encourage Manavalan to find a job and become responsible in life. Kanchana strongly recommends keeping Saradha and Selvi apart and offers to relocate. Saradha vacates her house and leaves the neighborhood on foot, and gets hit by a reversing car, driven by Guru Rengan. He admits Saradha in a hospital and goes to a police station to file a complaint. Manavalan goes there at the same time to report a missing Saradha and the pieces fall together. Guru Rengan, who is a rich industrialist from Bangalore, learns about Saradha's heart condition and offers to pay for the surgery. Manavalan drives Saradha to Vellore for the surgery.
18	Saradha's heart surgery is successful. Guru Rengan takes Saradha to Bangalore and gives his details to Manavalan, who loses the details.
19	Details about the sitcom and interviews with artists
20	Details about the sitcom and interviews with artists
21	Details about the sitcom and interviews with artists
22	Details about the sitcom and interviews with artists
23	Years roll by, and Saradha is a key person in Guru Rengan's company and they both are older people now in Bangalore. Saradha lives in the same house with Guru Rengan and his mother. They seem to share a non-romantic friendship.
24	We learn thru Velu Vathiyaar (a Tamil scholar and a family friend) that Guru Rengan lost interest in the idea of a marriage after his fiancée died in an air crash several years ago. Velu Vaathiyaar and Guru Rengan's mother suggest he should marry Saradha, but he laughs it off.
25	The very talkative Velu Vaathiyaar tries to take vow of silence for a day, but cannot keep it up when he gets a phone call from his son, working in a war zone. Saradha still cannot forget her kids and keeps thinking of them.
26	We see a flashback of the events that show how Saradha blended in with Guru Rengan's family
27	Saradha runs into Manjula and her son in Bangalore and is reminded of her own kids. She wants to know about their whereabouts, and expresses her desire to Guru Rengan but he discourages her saying the reunion will only cause confusion. Saradha promises to observe them from a distance and not reveal her identity to them. Guru Rengan agrees to go to Chennai and track the children down.
28	Velu Vathiyaar gets the news that his son working in Somalia as part of a peace keeping force, has died in an explosion. He share the news with Guru Rengan's mom, but hides it from his wife because she cannot handle the shock. Guru Rengan returns from Chennai and reveals Saradha's son Jawahar is now popular actor Jeeva. He promises to arrange for Saradha to see him when Jeeva visits Bangalore soon.

== Cast ==
- Geetha as Saradha
- T. V. Varadarajan as Senthil Kumar
- Renuka as Manjula
- Kavithalaya Krishnan as Manavalan
- Charuhasan as Pandurangan
- Madhan Bob as Dr. Rudran
- Chitra as Kanchana
- Dhamu as Somu, Kanchana's car driver
- Prakash Raj as M.P. Guru Rengan
- Vaali as Velu Vaathiyaar
- Ramesh Arvind as Jeeva
