= Kizhakkum Merkkum =

1998 film by Kalanjiyam

- Title card
- Directed by: Kalanjiyam
- Written by: Kalanjiyam
- Produced by: Amudha Durairaj
- Starring: Napoleon; Nassar; Devayani; Geetha
- Cinematography: K. V. Mani
- Edited by: B. Lenin; V. T. Vijayan
- Music by: Ilaiyaraaja
- Production company: Deivanai Movies
- Release date: 14 January 1998
- Running time: 161 minutes
- Country: India
- Language: Tamil

Kizhakkum Merkkum (pronounced [kiɻakkːum meːrkkːum] transl. East and West) is a 1998 Indian Tamil-language drama film directed by Kalanjiyam. The film stars Napoleon, Nassar, Devayani and Geetha, with Manivannan, Thalaivasal Vijay, Vichithra, Theni Kunjarammal, Kalyanjiyam, and Chaplin Balu playing supporting roles. It was released on 14 January 1998.

== Plot ==
Suryamurthy (Napoleon) and Thillai (Geetha) are siblings. They were expelled from their home by their stepmother Chinnamma (Theni Kunjarammal) at a young age. The siblings worked hard to come up in life.

Many years later, Suryamurthy looks for a groom for his sister and finds Kathalingam (Nassar), who is from another village. So Suryamurthy inquires the villagers about Kathalingam's character, and everyone praised Kathalingam, but they lied. Kathalingam is actually a bad person and drunkard, and he has an affair with the village belle Valli (Vichithra). Without knowing the truth, Kathalingam and Thillai get married. Finally, Thillai and Suryamurthy realise that Kathalingam is a bad person, but it was too late.

In the meantime, Suryamurthy and Kathalingam's sister Mallika (Devayani) fall in love with each other; however, Thillai warns him about the consequence of this love on her married life. After a misunderstanding, Mallika begins to hate the honest Suryamurthy. When Kathalingam prepares the wedding between Mallika and a well-educated groom, the wedding is cancelled. The groom's family refuses to marry the bride, who had an affair with Suryamurthy. Kathalingam gets angry and brutally beats Thillai in front of her brother. Suryamurthy begs him to leave her in peace, but Kathalingam refuses, and Suryamurthy is forced to beat Kathalingam in turn. Suryamurthy cannot bear the pain endured by his sister and kidnaps Mallika to stop this cruelty. Kathalingam decides to live with Valli. What transpires next forms the rest of the story.

== Cast ==
- Napoleon as Suryamurthy
- Nassar as Kathalingam
- Devayani as Mallika
- Geetha as Thillai
- Manivannan as Villager
- Thalaivasal Vijay as Ganesan
- Vichithra as Valli
- Theni Kunjarammal as Chinnamma
- Kalanjiyam as Muthukumar
- Chaplin Balu as Chinnarasu
- G. M. Sundar
- Meendum Sundar
- Devaki
- Tamilselvi
- Radhasri
- Padma

== Soundtrack ==
The music was composed by Ilaiyaraaja.

Song	Singer(s)	Lyrics	Duration
"Akka Nee Sirichcha"	Bhavatharini	Vaasan	5:03
"Kathunkuyilae"	Sadhana Sargam	Arivumathi	4:53
"Koodapporantha"	Ilaiyaraaja	Vaasan	5:05
"Oru Katthirikka"	Ilaiyaraaja	Palani Bharathi	5:05
"Poo Nilavondru"	S. P. Balasubrahmanyam	Palani Bharathi	5:15
"Poongaatrae"	Bhavatharini	Arivumathi	4:44
"Vayasupulla"	Sadhana Sargam	Arivumathi	5:25
"Yennoda Ulagam"	Ilaiyaraaja	Vaasan	5:08

== Reception ==
D. S. Ramanujam of The Hindu wrote, "Much of the director's work gets solid support from the camera of K. V. Mani, the unusual choice of the village landscape, the greenery and flower fields adding lustre to the artistes' efforts". He added, "For Napoleon, playing the orphaned younger brother Suryamurthy is a tall order no doubt. He is good in delivering long lines but the amount of emotional content in them not being fully brought out in his essay, the crying scenes not being his forte". The film won the Tamil Nadu State Film Award for Best Film Portraying Woman in Good Light, and Arivumathi won for Best Lyricist. Two years after release, the producers were given a ₹5 lakh (equivalent to ₹21 lakh or US$22,000 in 2023) subsidy by the Tamil Nadu government along with several other films.
