= Ganga Yamuna Saraswati =

Indian 1998 Tamil-language television series

- Genre: Drama
- Written by: Indhumathi
- Directed by: Robert; Ramesh
- Starring: M. S. Viswanathan; Manivannan; Renuka; Thalaivasal Vijay; Sithara; Pallavi; Poovilangu Mohan; Muralikumar; Rajashree; M. S. Bhaskar; Chitra Lakshmanan
- Theme music composer: M. S. Viswanathan
- Opening theme: "Ganga Yamuna Saraswati"
- Composer: Abhavanan
- Original language: Tamil
- No. of seasons: 1
- No. of episodes: 495 (list of episodes)

Production
- Producer: Thenmozhi Abavaanan
- Cinematography: Siva
- Editor: Presath
- Camera setup: Multi-camera
- Running time: approx. 20–21 minutes per episode
- Production company: Kalaimalar televisions

Original release
- Network: Raj TV
- Release: 1998 – 2001

Ganga Yamuna Saraswati is a 1998 Indian Tamil-language soap opera that aired on Raj TV. The show stars M. S. Viswanathan, Manivannan, Renuka, Thalaivasal Vijay, Sithara, Pallavi, Muralikumar, Rajashree, M. S. Bhaskar, Poovilangu Mohan and Chitra Lakshmanan.

The show is produced by Thenmozhi Abavaanan for Kalaimani Televisions. The story is contributed by Indhumathi and screenplay by Ashokkumar, Presath, Jeeva, and director by Robert and Ramesh. It had been receiving the highest ratings of Tamil serials and it was credited as the best serial and received high praise from viewers. The title track was composed by M. S. Viswanathan and sung by M. S. Viswanathan and Hariharan. The story about revolves around three characters, Ganga, Yamuna and Saraswathi.

== Cast ==
- M. S. Viswanathan
- Manivannan
- Renuka
- Thalaivasal Vijay
- Sithara
- Pallavi
- Muralikumar
- Chitra Lakshmanan
- Rajashree
- M. S. Bhaskar
- Sukumari
- Gandhimathi
- Pandu
- Tinky Simar Kaur
- Sujitha
- Thalapathi Dinesh
