= 6′.2″ =

- DVD cover
- Directed by: V. Senthil Kumar
- Story by: Prithvi Rajkumar
- Produced by: A. Palanivel; V. C. Anandan
- Starring: Sathyaraj; Sunitha Varma
- Cinematography: Sureshdevan
- Edited by: Suresh Urs
- Music by: D. Imman
- Production company: AP Film Garden
- Release date: 12 May 2005
- Running time: 147 minutes
- Country: India
- Language: Tamil

6'.2" (6 feet, 2 inches) is a 2005 Indian Tamil language thriller film directed by V. Senthil Kumar. The film stars Sathyaraj, newcomer Sunitha Varma and Vadivelu, whilst music for the film was composed by D. Imman. The film was released on 12 May 2005.

== Plot ==
James (Sathyaraj), a middle-aged man working at a US-based call centre company's night shift in Chennai. One day, on his way back from night shift, James witnesses a murder in the local train. The victim is revealed to be a harbour union leader, Krishnamoorthy (Ajay Rathnam), leaving James as the only eyewitness. Inspector Soundarapandian (Raj Kapoor) interrogates James about the murderer, and he promises the police to identify the murderer. An informer, Aishwarya (Sunitha Varma), is summoned by Inspector Soundarapandian to crack the case. Both Aishwarya and James are asked to stay at the neighbour's house of Krishnamoorthy's family as husband & wife, a drama set up by the inspector to nab the murderer. Soon, they became close with the family and their three daughters. Things get intriguing when it is shown that James himself is the murderer, and he kills Krishnamoorthy's father this time.

Parallel narration is the comedy track of White (Vadivelu), who is a friend of James.

Through the flashback, it was shown that James's real name is Balamurugan. Actually, it was Krishnarmoorthy's family that killed James's Parents several years ago. So, back in the present, James is on a killing spree to avenge this entire family. How James managed to pull this off and find his biological sister among the three girls forms the rest of the story.

== Cast ==
- Sathyaraj as James (Balamurugan)
- Sunitha Varma as Aishwarya
- Vadivelu as Mr. White
- Raveendar as Ramamurthy
- Raj Kapoor as Sundarapandian
- Ajay Rathnam as Krishnamurthy
- Devadarshini as Meenakshi
- Manobala as Krishnamurthy's father
- Vincent Asokan as Devaraj
- Thyagu as shop owner
- Madhan Bob
- Singamuthu
- Bonda Mani
- Rinku Ghosh
- Bava Lakshmanan

== Production ==
The film marked the debut of V. Senthil Kumar who earlier assisted K. Bhagyaraj, Praveenkanth and Sakthi Chidambaram. The film's title was named after Sathyaraj's height. The film was launched at Pillaiyar temple of AVM Studios, Chennai on 21 January 2005. The filming was also held at Ooty.

== Soundtrack ==
The soundtrack was composed by D. Imman.

Lyrics were written by Pa. Vijay and Snehan.

Track listing
No.	Title	Lyrics	Singer(s)	Length
1.	"Napolean"	Pa. Vijay	D. Imman, Nithyashree Mahadevan
2.	"Maatenguthu"	Pa. Vijay	Anuradha Sriram, Harish Raghavendra
3.	"Nee Otha Inchu"	Snehan	Haricharan, Sangeetha Sajith
4.	"Pottuthakka"	Pa. Vijay	Pushpavanam Kuppusamy, Srinivas, A. R. Suhahini
5.	"Raavanane"	Snehan	Suchitra

== Reception ==
Malini Mannath of Chennai Online wrote "It has a knot which had the potential to be turned into an engaging suspense thriller, and it has a couple of twists and turns that take the audience by surprise. But if only the debutant director had taken more care on weaving his screenplay, and had a tighter grip on his narration! There are too many loose ends here and too many distractions. So the knot with potential goes unexplored and the only interesting bits are the couple of twists and surprises in the script, the rest a hotch-potch of situations". Visual Dasan of Kalki praised the director for building the suspense, Sathyaraj's performance and Vadivelu's humour and concluded saying it was satisfying watching a detective movie after a long break.
