= Chitra Lakshmanan =

Indian actor and film director

- Born: 23 January 1948 (age 78); Arani, Tamil Nadu, India
- Occupations: Film director, Film producer, Actor, Film journalist
- Years active: 1983-present
- Spouse: Radhika
- Children: 2

Lakshmanan Ramasamy (born 23 January 1948), known professionally as Chitra Lakshmanan, is an Indian journalist, filmmaker and actor. He produced and directed several Tamil language films starring some of Tamil cinema's major stars during the 1980s and 1990s, while appearing in numerous films and television series in supporting roles. He currently operates the YouTube channel Touring Talkies, which features Tamil cinema related interviews and discussions.

== Career ==
Lakshmanan began working in a hardware shop in Arani. He later joined the magazine Vidhi Velli as a sub-editor until its closure. He later joined Thayin Manikodi run by Jayakanthan. He later joined a Singaporean Tamil magazine. After its failure, he decided to start his own magazine Thirai Kathir which became successful. His career in entertainment journalism helped him to also become a public relations officer.

He became acquainted with director Bharathiraja to enter the film industry, and subsequently served as a co-producer on all his films with Lakshmanan's brother, Ramu. In 1983, he produced Mann Vasanai under Gayathri Films, which won commercial success as well as the Filmfare Award for Best Tamil Film. He also served as a press relations officer for Tamil films during the 1980s, and later reprised that role as an actor through Uttama Villain (2015). His first directorial venture was Soora Samhaaram (1988) with Kamal Haasan and later he directed Periya Thambi (1997) with Prabhu and Chinna Raja (1999) with Karthik in the lead role. He turned actor in Japanil Kalyanaraman (1985) and began to prioritise acting commitments in the 2000s, winning acclaim for his comedy roles in Boss Engira Bhaskaran (Nene Ambhani) (2010) and Theeya Velai Seiyyanum Kumaru (2013).

Throughout his career, Lakshmanan has also taken up posts of responsibility. He served as the Secretary of Tamil Film Producers Council for four years and as an executive committee member in South Indian Film Chamber of Commerce, Film Federation of India, and Tamil Film Directors Association for several years. In 2011, he published the book 80 Years of Tamil Cinema, an account documenting the history of Tamil cinema.

== Filmography ==
=== As producer ===
| Year | Film | Notes |
|---|---|---|
| 1983 | Mann Vasanai | |
| 1984 | Ambigai Neril Vanthaal | |
| 1984 | Vaazhkai | |
| 1985 | Puthiya Theerppu | |
| 1987 | Jallikattu | |
| 1989 | Chinnappadass | |

=== As director and producer ===
| Year | Film | Notes |
|---|---|---|
| 1988 | Soora Samhaaram | |
| 1997 | Periya Thambi | |
| 1999 | Chinna Raja | |

=== As writer ===
| Year | Film | Notes |
|---|---|---|
| 1997 | Idhuthan Kadhala | dialogues only Tamil dubbed version of Telugu film Priya O Priya |
| 2008 | Rekha IPS | story only Television series aired in Kalaignar TV |

=== As actor ===
Films

| Year | Film | Role | Notes |
|---|---|---|---|
| 1984 | Pudhumai Penn | | |
| 1984 | Dhavani Kanavugal | | Guest appearance |
| 1985 | Japanil Kalyanaraman | Guide Munusamy | |
| 1985 | Puthiya Theerppu | Murali | |
| 1986 | Neethana Antha Kuyil | | |
| 1987 | Jallikattu | Dharmaraj | |
| 1987 | Poo Poova Poothirukku | Narayanan | |
| 1997 | Periya Thambi | | |
| 1999 | Chinna Raja | | |
| 1999 | Sundari Neeyum Sundaran Naanum | Ramalingam | Guest appearance |
| 2001 | Ullam Kollai Poguthae | Jyothi's father | |
| 2001 | Azhagana Naatkal | | |
| 2002 | Kadhal Virus | | Guest appearance |
| 2002 | Unnai Ninaithu | Vaidyalingam | |
| 2004 | Bose | | |
| 2004 | Kangalal Kaidhu Sei | Subramaniam | |
| 2004 | Vasool Raja MBBS | Dr. Kalidas | |
| 2006 | Unarchigal | Balaji's father | Guest appearance |
| 2006 | Pachchak Kuthira | The mayor's personal assistant | |
| 2006 | Kusthi | | |
| 2007 | Piragu | Film Producer | |
| 2008 | Vaitheeswaran | Dhanasekaran's Henchman | |
| 2008 | Bommalattam | Makeup man | |
| 2010 | Boss Engira Bhaskaran | Shanmugasundaram | |
| 2011 | Sadhurangam | | |
| 2012 | Saguni | Boopathi's sidekick | |
| 2013 | Settai | Murugaraj | |
| 2013 | Isakki | Devarajan | |
| 2013 | Pattathu Yaanai | Inspector | |
| 2013 | Theeya Velai Seiyyanum Kumaru | Kunchithapadam | |
| 2013 | Arya Surya | | |
| 2013 | Ya Ya | Kanaka's father | |
| 2013 | Naveena Saraswathi Sabatham | Kovai Kamaraj | |
| 2014 | Ninaithathu Yaaro | | |
| 2014 | Nimirndhu Nil | Judge Chitra Lakshmanan | |
| 2014 | Aranmanai | Maya's father | |
| 2015 | Janda Pai Kapiraju | Judge Lakshmanan | Telugu film |
| 2015 | Nannbenda | Hotel Manager | |
| 2015 | Uttama Villain | PRO Lakshmanan | |
| 2015 | Sakalakala Vallavan | Shakthi's Uncle | |
| 2016 | Aranmanai 2 | Anitha and Ravi's father | |
| 2016 | Pokkiri Raja | Dr. Kothandam | |
| 2016 | Vaaliba Raja | Chithra Lakshmanan | |
| 2016 | Muthina Kathirika | Politician | |
| 2016 | Vellikizhamai 13am Thethi | Raasathi's father | |
| 2017 | Kattappava Kanom | Jayagopal | |
| 2017 | Ullam Ullavarai | | |
| 2018 | Vidhi Madhi Ultaa | Divya's father | |
| 2018 | Nagesh Thiraiyarangam | Pundek | |
| 2018 | Itly | Bank Manager | |
| 2021 | Dikkiloona | L. Gopal, Priya's father | |
| 2022 | Kaathuvaakula Rendu Kaadhal | Rambo's fake father | |
| 2023 | Kannai Nambathey | Divya's father | |
| 2024 | Dear | Doctor | |
| 2024 | Vaagai | | |
| 2025 | Kuzhanthaigal Munnetra Kazhagam | | |
| 2025 | Otha Votu Muthaiya | Periyappa | |
| 2025 | Enai Sudum Pani | Thangaraj | |
| 2025 | Thalaivan Thalaivii | Senior politician | |
| 2026 | TN 2026 | Film Producer | |
| 2026 | Karuppu | Tamil Legislative Assembly speaker | Uncredited role |

Television

| Year | Title | Role | Channel |
|---|---|---|---|
| 2003 - 2009 | Anandham | | Sun TV |
| 2006 - 2008 | Ganga Yamuna Saraswati | | Sun TV |
| 2009 - 2012 | Idhayam | Devarajan | Sun TV |
| 2012 - 2013 | Sondha Bandham | Damodaran | Sun TV |
| 2014 - 2015 | Akka | | Jaya TV |
| 2018 - 2019 | Chandralekha | Gemini Ganeshan | Sun TV |

=== Voice actor ===
| Year | Title | Actor | Character | Notes |
|---|---|---|---|---|
| 2017 | Vasuki | S. N. Swamy | Swamy | Dubbed version of Malayalam film Puthiya Niyamam |
