= Veera Padhakkam =

- Poster
- Directed by: Manivannan
- Written by: Manivannan
- Produced by: M. Ramanathan
- Starring: Sathyaraj; Radhika Sarathkumar; Urvashi
- Cinematography: D. Sankar
- Edited by: P. Venkateswara Rao
- Music by: Deva
- Production company: Raj Films International
- Release date: 3 November 1994
- Country: India
- Language: Tamil

Veera Padhakkam (transl. Medal of bravery) is a 1994 Indian Tamil-language action film written and directed by Manivannan, starring Sathyaraj, Radhika Sarathkumar and Urvashi. It was released on 3 November 1994.

== Plot ==
A policeman uses corrupt means to reach the highest position in the police hierarchy. He changes after he meets a relative whose life he had destroyed because of his corrupt activities.

== Cast ==
- Sathyaraj as Kalivarathan IPS
- Radhika Sarathkumar as Thangamma
- Urvashi as Minister Vishalakshi
- Manivannan as Palanisamy
- Raghuvaran as Vadivelu
- Nizhalgal Ravi
- Silk Smitha
- Sabitha Anand
- Mucherla Aruna
- Senthil
- R. Sundarrajan
- Vinu Chakravarthy

== Soundtrack ==
The music was composed by Deva, with lyrics written by Vaali.

Track listing
No.	Title	Singer(s)	Length
1.	"Aadum Varai"	Malaysia Vasudevan	5:09
2.	"Chinna Thambiye"	S. P. Balasubrahmanyam	4:59
3.	"Indha Maanai"	Kavita Krishnamurti	5:43
4.	"Meesa Vecha"	K. S. Chithra, S. P. Balasubrahmanyam	4:37
5.	"Othayile"	K. S. Chithra	0:55
6.	"Paadupatta"	K. S. Chithra	1:10
7.	"Pattukottai"	S. P. Balasubrahmanyam	4:57
8.	"Poomudithu"	K. S. Chithra	0:42
Total length:			28:12

== Reception ==
Malini Mannath of The Indian Express wrote the film "keeps the viewers engaged in the first half", but the second half "fails to deliver the same effect." K. Vijiyan of New Straits Times wrote "Those who liked Manivannan's previous political satires will also like this movie".
