= Vaazhkai Chakkaram =

1990 Indian film

- Poster
- Directed by: Manivannan
- Written by: Manivannan
- Produced by: Tirupur Mani
- Starring: Sathyaraj; Gautami
- Cinematography: D. Sankar
- Edited by: M. N. Raja
- Music by: Shankar–Ganesh
- Production company: Vivekananda Pictures
- Release date: 9 February 1990
- Running time: 130 minutes
- Country: India
- Language: Tamil

Vaazhkai Chakkaram (transl. The wheel of life) is a 1990 Indian Tamil-language action drama film directed by Manivannan. The film stars Sathyaraj, Gautami, Goundamani and Vinu Chakravarthy. The film, produced and written by Tirupur Mani, was released on 9 February 1990.

== Plot ==
Thangavelu is a newly appointed police sub-inspector in his hometown Sulur. His father, Sadasiva Kounder, is excessively involved in his professional life, creating tension. Furthermore, Thangavelu's familial connections to nearly everyone in town make it difficult for him to enforce the law impartially. His uncle, Saaraya Kadai Kounder, the village president, is embroiled in manufacturing illicit liquor, alongside his son Periyasamy. Thangavelu's arrest of Periyasamy sparks a bitter feud between the families. A local matchmaker presents both Periyasamy and Thangavelu as potential grooms to Kalyani from Dindigul. She chooses Thangavelu, further straining relations between the families.

Thangavelu and Kalyani become engaged, while Saaraya Kadai Kounder arranges for Periyasamy to marry Thaaiyamma, daughter of the impoverished Zamindar Doraisamy. Doraisamy, aware of Periyasamy's activities, feels compelled to accept the marriage proposal due to his financial desperation. Meanwhile, Sadasiva Kounder demands a dowry of ₹200,000 (equivalent to ₹2.0 million or US$20,000 in 2023), prompting him to call off Thangavelu and Kalyani's wedding. Thangavelu is outraged, as he strongly opposes the dowry system. Thangavelu and Doraisamy eventually convince Sadasiva Kounder to reconsider, and although delayed, they proceed to the wedding. But their bus crashes, injuring Sadasiva Kounder, who loses his leg. Overcome with remorse, Sadasiva Kounder views his injury as punishment for his demands for dowry.

Kalyani's father, believing Sadasiva Kounder's actions were deliberate, succumbs to humiliation and takes his own life. Thangavelu arrives too late to prevent the tragedy, and Kalyani struggles to forgive him despite his explanations. Kalyani and her family leave town, and she becomes a constable to support them. Ironically, she lands at the same police station where Thangavelu works. Thangavelu still harbors feelings for Kalyani, while she grapples with conflicting emotions. Meanwhile, Thaaiyamma suffers abuse and harassment at the hands of Saaraya Kadai Kounder's family. When Thangavelu and Kalyani investigate a domestic abuse complaint, Thaaiyamma refuses to cooperate, fearing her in-laws' retaliation. Her father, Doraisamy, declines to intervene, citing societal norms.

Thaaiyamma witnesses Saaraya Kadai Kounder murdering a maid, leaving her disturbed. Thangavelu arrests Saaraya Kadai Kounder based on evidence from tribal men, enraging him. Assuming Thaaiyamma must have informed the police, Saaraya Kadai Kounder orders Periyasamy to murder her. Thangavelu, attempting to make amends, arranges funds for Thaaiyamma's dowry. However, when Doraisamy delivers the money, he discovers his daughter's lifeless body, framed as a fire accident. Doraisamy reports the incident to Thangavelu and he single-handedly dismantles Saaraya Kadai Kounder's illicit liquor business and ultimately kills Periyasamy and Saaraya Kadai Kounder.

Finally, Kalyani handcuffs Thangavelu but then has a change of heart, and makes him tie the thaali, accepting him as her husband.

== Cast ==
- Sathyaraj as Thangavelu
- Gautami as Kalyani
- Goundamani as Ramasamy
- Jai Ganesh as Saaraya Kadai Kounder
- Vinu Chakravarthy as Sadasiva Kounder
- Sabitha Anand as Thaaiyamma
- Vijay Krishnaraj as Zamindar Doraisamy
- Raja as Thangavelu's brother
- Meesai Murugesan as Constable
- Vasu as Amavasai
- Manivannan as Kalyani's father (Cameo appearance)
- Sundar C as Constable (Cameo appearance)

== Soundtrack ==
The soundtrack was composed by Shankar–Ganesh.

Track listing
No.	Title	Lyrics	Singer(s)	Length
1.	"Thookkanam Kuruvi Koodula"	Kamakodiyan	S. P. Balasubrahmanyam, S. V. Ponnusamy	04:35
2.	"Vizhiye Vizhiye Kaditham"	Pulamaipithan	S. P. Balasubrahmanyam, K. S. Chithra	05:08
3.	"Aathankarai Oram"	Kamakodiyan	S. P. Balasubrahmanyam, K. S. Chithra	05:11
4.	"Enakku Nee Unakku Naan"	Vaali	S. P. Balasubrahmanyam	04:46
5.	"Marappan Pondatti"	Pulamaipithan	S. P. Balasubrahmanyam	05:04
6.	"Gounder Veettu Vayalu"	Vaali	S. P. Balasubrahmanyam	05:34
Total length:				31:18

== Reception ==
P. S. S. of Kalki called the film old food with new decoration.
