= Ashoka (2006 film) =

- VCD cover
- Directed by: Shivamani
- Written by: Shivamani; B. A. Madhu (dialogue)
- Screenplay by: Shivamani
- Story by: Ramesh Yadav
- Produced by: Ramesh Yadav; Radhakrishna (presents)
- Starring: Shiva Rajkumar; Sunitha Varma; Tejashree
- Cinematography: Sundarnath Suvarna
- Edited by: P R Sounder Rajan
- Music by: Sadhu Kokila
- Production company: Royal Pictures
- Release date: 17 March 2006
- Running time: 147 minutes
- Country: India
- Language: Kannada

Ashoka is a 2006 Indian Kannada-language action film directed by Shivamani. The film stars Shiva Rajkumar, Sunitha Varma, and Tejashree. It was released on 17 March 2006.

== Cast ==
- Shiva Rajkumar as Ashoka
- Sunitha Varma
- Tejashree
- Srinivasa Murthy as the father
- Vinaya Prasad as a cop
- Shivamani as an undercover police investigator
- Sathya Prakash
- Sathyajith
- Ashok
- Govinda Rao
- Kishore

== Production ==
Ashoka is director Shivamani's first film with producer Ramesh Yadav, who also wrote the story. The film is the 14th one produced by Yadav.

== Soundtrack ==
Music by Sadhu Kokila. Lyrics written by K. Kalyan.

No.	Title	Singer(s)	Length
1.	"Thai Thai Thai Bangari"	Chaitra H. G., Rajesh Krishnan
2.	"Manasello Ello Yeko Ello"	Nandhita, Rajesh Krishnan
3.	"Anna Look Kotre Zoom"	Hemanth Kumar
4.	"Dil Ayte Duniya Ayte"	Chaitra H. G., Gururaj Hoskote
5.	"Naa Atmu"	J. Anoop Seelin, Malathi, Suma Shastri

== Release and reception ==
Ashoka was released on 17 March 2006 after being delayed. K.N. Venkatasubba Rao of The Hindu opined that "Borrowing its plot straight from published sensational news stories, in a cut and paste format, Ashoka attempts to trace the nexus between the police and underworld in a despicable but undeniable fashion". R G Vijayasarathy of Rediff.com said that "Overall, Ashoka is good if you want to see another side of Shivaraj Kumar". The film was commercially unsuccessful.
