= Periya Thambi =

1997 film by Chitra Lakshmanan

- Poster
- Directed by: Chitra Lakshmanan
- Written by: S. A. Abirama Moorthy (dialogues)
- Screenplay by: Chitra Lakshmanan
- Story by: Kesavan
- Produced by: Chitra Lakshmanan; Chithra Ramu
- Starring: Prabhu; Nagma
- Cinematography: Ilavarasu
- Edited by: N. Chandran
- Music by: Deva
- Production company: Gayathri Films
- Release date: 14 January 1997
- Running time: 150 minutes
- Country: India
- Language: Tamil

Periya Thambi (transl. Big brother) is a 1997 Indian Tamil-language drama film directed and co-produced by Chitra Lakshmanan. The film stars Prabhu and Nagma. It was released on 14 January 1997.

== Plot ==
Siva (Prabhu) lives with his father Soundarapandian (Thalaivasal Vijay), a police officer, and his little sister Geetha in the city. Geetha gets engaged and Siva notes that his father will not invite his family to the wedding. Hence, Siva finds out the village of his family and decides to go there. At his father's village, Siva is insulted by his uncle Sankarapandian (Vijayakumar), while his aunt Kamachi (Vadivukkarasi) welcomes him. Soon, Kamachi's daughter Selvi (Nagma) and Siva fall in love with each other. How Siva reconciles his uncle and marries Selvi forms the rest of the story.

== Cast ==
- Prabhu as Siva
- Nagma as Selvi
- Goundamani as Azhagu Sundaram
- Vijayakumar as Sankarapandian
- Chandrasekhar as Muthu
- Thalaivasal Vijay as Sundarapandian, Siva's father
- Uday Prakash as Thangarasu
- Ponvannan as Rathnam
- Vadivukkarasi as Kamachi, Selvi's mother
- Sangeeta as Sivagami
- R. V. Aswini as Meena, Sankarapandian's daughter
- Suvarna Mathew as Kannamma
- Chitra Lakshmanan
- K. K. Soundar as Muthu's father
- Kullamani
- Periya Karuppu Thevar
- Jaya Mani
- Mahanadi Dinesh

== Soundtrack ==
The music was composed by Deva, with lyrics written by Vairamuthu.

Song	Singer(s)	Duration
"Aavaram Poovu"	Krishnaraj	5:22
"Left Right"	Swarnalatha	4:13
"Poovukku Oru Kalyanam"	Malaysia Vasudevan, Mano, Swarnalatha	5:17
"Taj Mahale"	Hariharan, Anuradha Sriram	5:12
"Vellikizhamai"	Swarnalatha	5:09

== Release and reception ==
The film was released in Pongal 1997 alongside Minsara Kanavu, Iruvar, Bharathi Kannamma and Dharma Chakkaram. R. P. R. of Kalki praised the first half as natural but criticised the second half as cliched and routine.
