= Pudhu Manithan =

- Poster
- Directed by: Manivannan
- Screenplay by: Manivannan; R. M. Veerappan
- Story by: R. M. Veerappan; R. Selvaraj
- Produced by: R. M. Veerappan; V. Tamil Azhagan; V. Selvam; V. Thangaraj
- Starring: Sathyaraj; Bhanupriya; Sarathkumar
- Cinematography: S. Sankar
- Edited by: K. R. Krishnan
- Music by: Deva
- Production company: Sathya Movies
- Release date: 22 March 1991
- Running time: 140 minutes
- Country: India
- Language: Tamil

Pudhu Manithan (transl. New person) is a 1991 Indian Tamil-language film, directed by Manivannan. The film stars Sathyaraj and Bhanupriya, with Sarathkumar as the antagonist. It was released on 22 March 1991 and became a box office hit.

== Plot ==
Kabali, an orphan, lives in a slum with an old Brahmin woman named Pangajam, and he considers her like his mother. Kabali is a fisherman and also the slum's rowdy, but he has a heart of gold. He went to jail many times only because he fought against injustice.

Suganthi, a chorus singer who is also an orphan, often returns home late. For her safety, she uses Kabali's name to avoid the rowdies and lies that she is his girlfriend. One day, Kabali meets her and slaps her for misusing his name. Thereafter, he falls in love with her.

Sundar is a rich man and womanizer. He is able to have any girls he wants by money or force. His mother sympathizes with Suganthi and decides to get her married to Sundar.

When Kabali decides to propose his love to Suganthi, she first tells him that she has accepted Sundar's marriage proposal, and she invites him to the wedding. Kabali is then heartbroken as he knows about Sundar's bad habits, but he decides to hide the truth because he does not want to hurt her feelings.

At the wedding day, however, Sundar stops the marriage because he thinks that Suganthi has an illicit affair with Kabali. Kabali tells him that he is wrong and challenges him to arrange their marriage another day. What transpires later forms the crux of the story.

== Cast ==
- Sathyaraj as Kabali
- Sarathkumar as Sundar
- Bhanupriya as Suganthi
- Manorama as Pankajam
- Goundamani as Rasappa
- Madhuri as Lakshmi
- Sathyapriya as Saradha
- Thalapathi Dinesh as Henchman
- Ponnambalam as Henchman
- Manivannan
- Vasu
- Ennatha Kannaiya
- Poornam Viswanathan in a cameo appearance
- L. R. Eswari in a cameo appearance
- Shankar–Ganesh in a cameo appearance

== Soundtrack ==
The soundtrack was composed by Deva.

Song	Singer(s)	lyricist	Length
"Angam Unathu Angam"	S. P. Balasubrahmanyam, K. S. Chithra	Vairamuthu	5:49
"Nilavukku Thaalaattu"	S. Janaki	Na. Kamarasan	4:53
"Othuda Othuda"	Malaysia Vasudevan, Kovai Kamala	Kalidasan	5:32
"Valaikku Thappiya Meenu"	K. J. Yesudas	Vairamuthu	4:34
"Thinam Thinam"	K. S. Chithra	Muthulingam	4:30
"Yelelankuyilae"	K. S. Chithra	Vairamuthu	4:21

== Reception ==
C. R. K. of Kalki called it super entertaining with Manorama, Sathyaraj and director Manivannan as strong pillars. Deva won the Cinema Express Award for Best Music Director.
