= Antha Sila Naatkal =

- Title card
- Directed by: Venkat
- Written by: Venkat
- Based on: Antha Sila Naatkal by Venkat
- Produced by: T. S. Sethuraman
- Starring: Mohan; Poornima
- Cinematography: Vishwa Natraj
- Edited by: K. R. Krishnan
- Music by: Ilaiyaraaja
- Production company: Meenakshi Finance
- Release date: 29 April 1983
- Country: India
- Language: Tamil

Antha Sila Naatkal (transl. Those few days) is a 1983 Indian Tamil-language drama film written and directed by Venkat. The film stars Mohan and Poornima, with Nithya Ravindran, Manorama, Vennira Aadai Moorthy and T. V. Varadarajan – in his screen debut – in supporting roles. It is based on Venkat's play of the same name. The film was released on 29 April 1983.

== Plot ==
Mohan, an MBA graduate working as a manager, falls in love with Poornima, who is a young woman from Mumbai and whose family rents a house from him. When she explains that she treats him only as a friend, he suffers a mental breakdown and spends several weeks in a psychiatric hospital. After returning home, Mohan struggles with the stigma surrounding his hospitalization because people in his community repeatedly bring up his mental health history. The resulting strain on his family life leads him to leave for Calcutta. Later Poornima follows him because she realises her feelings for the man.

== Cast ==
- Mohan as Gopi
- Poornima
- Nithya Ravindran
- Manorama
- Vennira Aadai Moorthy
- T. V. Varadarajan

== Production ==
Antha Sila Naatkal is based on Venkat's play of the same name. Varadarajan, who later became known as T. V. Varadarajan, made his film debut.

== Soundtrack ==
Soundtrack was composed by Ilaiyaraaja.

Song	Singers	Lyrics
"Nenisththaana"	S. Janaki, Malaysia Vasudevan	Gangai Amaran
"Vaammaa Vaammaa"	Malaysia Vasudevan, Gangai Amaran	Gangai Amaran
"Raajaa Raani"	Krishnachander, S. P. Sailaja	Vaali

== Release and reception ==
Antha Sila Naatkal was released on 29 April 1983 alongside another Venkat directorial Soorapuli. Jayamanmadhan (a duo) of Kalki praised the strong characterisation and Mohan's acting but panned the inclusion of Silk Smitha's song and double-meaning dialogues. The duo felt Ilaiyaraaja's tunes would have been composed during his tiredness and concluded it is okay even if one cannot give up the smell of the past because it is imported from the world of drama.
