= Soora Samhaaram =

1988 film by Chitra Lakshmanan

- Theatrical release poster
- Directed by: Chitra Lakshmanan
- Written by: Vietnam Veedu Sundaram (dialogues)
- Screenplay by: Chitra Lakshmanan
- Story by: Chitra Lakshmanan
- Produced by: Chithra Ramu
- Starring: Kamal Haasan; Nirosha; Kitty; Nizhalgal Ravi
- Cinematography: B. Kannan
- Edited by: P. Mohan Raj
- Music by: Ilaiyaraaja
- Production company: Gayathri Films
- Release date: 30 July 1988
- Country: India
- Language: Tamil

Soora Samhaaram (transl. Slaying of the demon) is a 1988 Indian Tamil-language action thriller film written and directed by Chitra Lakshmanan and co-written by Vietnam Veedu Sundaram. The film stars Kamal Haasan in the role of police officer, ACP Athi Veerapandiyan. The film was later dubbed in Telugu as Police Diary and released on 16 September 1988. Both the Tamil and Telugu versions were box office hits. The core plot of the film was reported to be based on the 1985 film Witness, though the director has denied it.

== Plot ==
Athi Veerapandiyan and Arun are police officers. Divya is a drug addict who cannot stop her habit even though her brother Arun pleads that she stops. One day Arun locks her up, but she dies from withdrawal. Devastated, Arun decides to take revenge on Mohandas, the kingpin of the drug mafia, but Mohandas kills him in an airport restroom. Sudha's young brother happens to watch this murder but is terrified to make this public. Pandian, who is in-charge of this case, zeroes in on Sudha and her brother as witnesses, but she refuses. But when Madhuri pleads for her help, she decides to help Pandian, but now Pandian is abducted by Mohandas's men and forcefully turn him into a drug addict. The climax reveals whether Pandian nabs the drug lord and completes the revenge of his friend Arun.

== Cast ==
- Kamal Haasan as ACP Athi Veerapandiyan
- Nirosha as Sudha
- Nizhalgal Ravi as Arun
- Pallavi as Divya
- Madhuri as Arun's wife
- Kitty as Mohandas
- Janagaraj as Jana
- Captain Raju as Chakkaravarthy (voice dubbed by Delhi Ganesh)
- Rajyalakshmi as Chakkaravarthy's daughter
- Vennira Aadai Moorthy as Mohandas's labourer
- Veeraraghavan
- Thakkali Srinivasan as Dileep
- Master Meenuraj as Sudha's brother
- Kuyli (special appearance in the song "Vedhalam Vanthiruku")

== Soundtrack ==
The music was composed by Ilaiyaraaja. The song "Naan Enbadhu" marked the singing debut of Arunmozhi who works as flute musician for Ilaiyaraaja's musical troupe.

Track listing
No.	Title	Lyrics	Singer(s)	Length
1.	"Aadum Neram Ithuthaan"	Gangai Amaran	P. Susheela	4:30
2.	"Naan Enbathu Nee Allava"	Gangai Amaran	Arunmozhi, K. S. Chithra	4:25
3.	"Neela Kuyile Solai Kuyile"	Gangai Amaran	Arunmozhi, K. S. Chithra	4:23
4.	"Vedhalam Vandhirukuthu"	Ilaiyaraaja	Mano, S. P. Sailaja	4:20
Total length:				17:38

Telugu track listing
No.	Title	Lyrics	Singer(s)	Length
1.	"Manakosam Madhumasam"	Rajasri	S. P. Balasubrahmanyam, K. S. Chithra	4:23
2.	"Naa Oopiri Neevenule"	Rajasri	S. P. Balasubrahmanyam, K. S. Chithra	4:25
3.	"Vacchaadu Aggipidugu"	Rajasri	S. P. Balasubrahmanyam, S. P. Sailaja & Chorus	4:20
4.	"Aade Eedu Needi Naadi"	Rajasri	K. S. Chithra	4:30
Total length:				17:38

== Reception ==
N. Krishnaswamy of The Indian Express wrote, "Soora Samharam is destined to be somewhat muffled in its explosive impact with the entertaining vein and progressively thinning". The film ran over 100 days in many centres. Sivaji Ganesan presided over the 100-day success celebration which was held on Haasan's birthday Ilaiyaraaja won the Cinema Express Award for Best Music Director. On 6 December 2021, in his YouTube channel, Touring Talkies, Chitra Lakshmanan said the Telugu-dubbed version Police Diary, which had one additional song, ran for 185 days in Andhra Pradesh.
