= Karungali (film) =

- Theatrical release poster
- Directed by: Kalanjiyam
- Written by: Kalanjiyam
- Produced by: Vivekanandan
- Starring: Kalanjiyam; Srinivas; Anjali; Sunitha Varma
- Cinematography: Siva Sundharam
- Edited by: LVK Doss
- Music by: Srikanth Deva
- Release date: 29 July 2011
- Country: India
- Language: Tamil

Karungali (transl. Ebony) is a 2011 Indian Tamil-language film written and directed by Kalanjiyam and produced by Vivekanandan. The film stars the director himself alongside Srinivas, Anjali, and Sunitha Varma in the lead roles, while Asmitha and Alex play supporting roles. The music was composed by Srikanth Deva, while editing was done by LVK Doss. The film was released on 29 July 2011. It was dubbed and released in Telugu as Sathi Leelavathi, with Kalanjiyam crediting himself under the name Prabhakaran.

== Plot ==
Dr. Kanimozhi is drawn to Pottalam Ravi because of his life-saving act and ultimately decides to marry him. She overlooks Ravi's brutal past life, during when he had murdered many, including Sengudi, who was with him right from their childhood days. She loves him, but he appears quite satisfied by using her whenever he is driven by his sexual urge. Believing that she could change him for the better, Kani marries him after his return from prison after a jail term. Ravi looks like a changed man after emerging from jail and tells his wife that the talks that he had with some religious people made him a complete man. However, his real self comes out when he hears about Kani's good-looking patient Amudhanila Gunasekharan and her "inability" to give birth to a child. Ravi's evil mind springs back to life as his urge to have sex with Amudha increases. He gets close to her, pretending to be the doctor's assistant. Ravi almost succeeds in making Amudha believe that he had the "solution" to "cure" her problem. How Amudha is saved and how Kani treats her sex-maniac husband is what the script is all about.

== Cast ==
- Kalanjiyam as Pottalam Ravi
- Srinivas as Guna
- Anjali as Amudhanila Gunasekharan
- Sunitha Varma as Dr. Kanimozhi
- Asmitha as Sengudi
- Alex

== Soundtrack ==
Soundtrack was composed by Srikanth Deva.

Track listing
No.	Title	Lyrics	Singer(s)	Length
1.	"Bhoomi Thaduthalum"	Erode Iraivan	Chinmayi
2.	"Manasuruguthe"	Erode Iraivan	Chinmayi
3.	"Priyame"	Ma. Pugazhenthi	Karthik
4.	"Ulle Oru"	Ilayakamban	Sathyan
5.	"Unnai Virumbi"	Erode Iraivan	Naresh Iyer, Priyadarshini
6.	"Vaada Soorapuli"	Ilayakamban	Naveen

== Reception ==
A critic fron Sify called the film a "crude affair", adding that the "subject in question is too heavy and has been handled in an insensitive way, making the film come across as a cheap, sex thriller." The New Indian Express wrote, "It's a theme that had the potential to turn into an engaging and provocative entertainer had it been executed with more conviction and finesse". Chennai Online wrote, "Kalanjiyam's treatment of the subject lacks credibility and the initial promise slowly wanes".
