= Nilave Mugam Kaattu =

1999 film by Kalanjiyam

- DVD cover
- Directed by: Kalanjiyam
- Screenplay by: Mu. Kalangiyam
- Story by: V. Umakanth
- Based on: Anuraga Sangama
- Produced by: S. Rajaram
- Starring: Karthik; Ramki; Devayani
- Cinematography: Abdul Rahman
- Edited by: V. T. Vijayan; B. Lenin
- Music by: Ilaiyaraaja
- Production company: Mahalakshmi International
- Release date: 30 April 1999
- Running time: 160 minutes
- Country: India
- Language: Tamil

Nilave Mugam Kaattu (transl. Oh Moon, please show your face) is a 1999 Indian Tamil-language romantic drama film directed by Kalanjiyam, starring Karthik, Ramki and Devayani. It is a remake of the Kannada film Anuraga Sangama (1995) which itself was inspired by Charlie Chaplin's City Lights. The film was released on 30 April 1999.

== Plot ==
Murthy and Prakash become best friends since Prakash's father killed Murthy's mother in a car accident. Despite his father's refusal, Prakash takes Murthy into his house. But Prakash's parents do not like their son making friendship with Murthy who is poor and they consider it to be a status issue.

A few years later, when Prakash goes to the US to study. Meanwhile, Prakash's parents scold Murthy with a plan to make him leave their house. Murthy feels bad and decides to leave Prakash's house without informing anyone. An old police constable accommodates Murthy who treats him like his late son Govind and the man begins to call him by that name. Murthy also comes under the identity of Govind now and starts working in an apartment by helping the residents of that apartment. Murthy has a percussion instrument and plays his favourite tune always. Murthy meets Kasturi, a blind flower seller and falls in love with her. Kasturi also likes Murthy's character after he saved her from a few thugs who tried to molest her. Kasturi's father is a drunkard and dies in an accident which leaves Kasturi alone with an eye injury which made her blind. Murthy takes care of Kasturi now and takes her to a doctor) with an aim of getting her vision. The doctor advises Kasturi to undergo a surgery following which there are chances for getting her vision. To pay for the operation, Murthy takes some money from a drunk man's house. In a misunderstanding, he gets arrested by the police and is sent to jail.

Kasturi gets her vision after surgery but she is worried as Murthy has never returned. The doctor takes Kasturi to her home and asks her to stay until Murthy comes back. In the meantime, Prakash returns to India after completing his studies and he falls in love with Kasturi at first sight. Prakash convinces his parents to arrange his wedding with Kasturi. Although Kasturi is not interested in this proposal, she is convinced by the doctor as there is no point in worrying about Murthy who has disappeared for a while.

Kasturi, who cannot find Murthy, agrees to wed Prakash although she is not interested. Murthy is released by the police as he is proved innocent. One day, Prakash finds Murthy and is shocked to see his condition. Prakash takes Murthy along with him to his home. At Prakash's home, Murthy is shocked knowing that he is in love with Kasturi who has got her eyesight now. Murthy decides to hide his identity to Kasturi (as she knows him only by the name Govind and she has not seen him before). Murthy does not even speak in front of Kasturi as she will be able to identify his voice. Murthy also convinces the doctor to not reveal about him to Kasturi as he wanted his close friend Prakash to lead a happy life marrying Kasturi.

On the day of the wedding, a poor boy comes to the marriage hall looking for food. He plays Murthy's tune with the percussion instrument which shocks Kasturi. She rushes to the boy and enquires about Govind. The boy points out Murthy as the one who taught him to play this tune while he was begging before. Now Kasturi understands that Prakash's friend Murthy is none other than Govind whom she was searching.

Kasturi runs towards Murthy and requests him to marry her. Murthy is shocked and speechless. Prakash's parents speak ill about Murthy and Kasturi. Prakash comes to the spot and asks the truth to Murthy. Murthy tries to manage the situation and finally, when Prakash asks him to make a promise on him, Murthy does not do fearing any harm to Prakash. Murthy reveals the truth and wants Prakash to lead a joyful life which made him sacrifice his love.

Prakash on hearing this is overwhelmed by the love of his friend and immediately asks him to marry Kasturi. Prakash promises to marry another girl for sure and requests Murthy not to hurt Kasturi. Murthy agrees and gets united with Kasturi.

== Cast ==
- Karthik as Murthy (Govind)
- Ramki as Prakash
- Devayani as Kasthuri
- Manivannan
- Vadivelu
- Sarath Babu as a police officer
- Nizhalgal Ravi as Prakash's father
- Srividya as a doctor
- J. Lalitha as Prakash's mother
- Delhi Ganesh as Kasthuri's father
- Sundar
- Chaplin Balu
- Rajaputhran
- Bayilvan Ranganathan
- Anwar Ali Khan
- Master Pradeep as Murthy (child)
- Master Mahendran as Prakash (child)
- Muthukaalai
- Kalanjiyam in a cameo appearance

== Production ==
The film was initially titled as Komali, before the title Nilave Mugam Kaattu was finalised.

== Soundtrack ==
The soundtrack was composed by Ilaiyaraaja. Music Magazine wrote "The master is back in form".

Song	Singer(s)	Lyrics	Duration
"Thendralai Kandu"	Hariharan, Ilaiyaraaja	Vaasan	5:30
"Vaigai Nadhi Karai"	Hariharan	Vaasan	5:01
"Thanna Thaniyaka"	Ilaiyaraaja	Vaasan	5:03
"Suthatha Bhoomi"	K. S. Chitra	Vaasan	5:20
"Chittu Parakkuthu"	Shankar Mahadevan, Sujatha Mohan	Mu. Metha	5:03
"Poonkaaththu Adhu"	S. P. Balasubrahmanyam, Ilaiyaraaja	Palani Bharathi	5:24

== Reception ==
D.S. Ramanujam of The Hindu wrote "Some DIRECTORS believe in taking time in assembling the characters in their drama and in one spurt, give the proceedings an exemplary lustre, justifying their approach. That is what director Mu. Kalanjiyam does in Mahalakshmi International's “Nilavae Mugam Kaattu”." Kala Krishnan Ramesh of Deccan Herald wrote, "Nilave Mugam Kattu is one of those watery, but not entirely unpleasant films that can be seen or not seen. The friendship theme is really being overdone, almost every film has a pair of good friends... men, never women, or rarely men and women. Nilave Mugam Kattu has one more negative thing - Ramki. Ramki simply has to be the most wooden actor in Tamil, why he even makes Abbas seem like a good actor!!".
