= Thozhar Pandian =

- Poster
- Directed by: Manivannan
- Written by: Manivannan
- Produced by: K. Balu
- Starring: Sathyaraj; Ranjitha
- Cinematography: D. Shankar
- Edited by: P. Venkateswara Rao
- Music by: Ilaiyaraaja
- Production company: K. B. Films
- Release date: 12 August 1994
- Country: India
- Language: Tamil

Thozhar Pandian (transl. Comrade Pandian) is a 1994 Indian Tamil-language film, written and directed by Manivannan. It stars Sathyaraj and Ranjitha. The film was released on 12 August 1994.

== Cast ==
- Sathyaraj as Pandian
- Ranjitha
- Napoleon as Shanmuganathan
- Sujatha
- Manivannan
- Manobala
- Vijaya Bharathi (aka Bharathi)
- Raghuvaran
- Anandaraj
- Silk Smitha
- R. Sundarrajan
- Manivasagam
- Halwa Vasu
- S. N. Lakshmi
- C. R. Saraswathi
- Sabitha Anand
- Anusha
- Chelladurai
- Nellai Siva

== Production ==
The film's title was named after Manivannan's friend known as 'Comrade' Pandian, a communist leader from Tamil Nadu.

== Soundtrack ==
Music was composed by Ilaiyaraaja.

Song	Singers	Lyrics
"Arakoraya Sethavanum"	Viji, Sundarrajan, Mano	Pulamaipithan
"Kattaaya Kadhal"	Swarnalatha, Mano	Vaali
"Mann Veettil Irundhaalum"	Malaysia Vasudevan	Pulamaipithan
"Paal Irukkum"	Viji, Sundarrajan, Mano, Sindhu	Vaali
"Tamizh Magane"	Mano	Vaali
