= Vaazhkai (1984 film) =

- Theatrical release poster
- Directed by: C. V. Rajendran
- Screenplay by: Panchu Arunachalam
- Story by: Mohan Kumar
- Produced by: Chitra Raamu; Chitra Lakshmanan
- Starring: Sivaji Ganesan; Ambika; Pandiyan
- Cinematography: T. S. Vinayagam
- Edited by: Chandran–Muthu
- Music by: Ilaiyaraaja
- Production company: Gayathri Films
- Distributed by: P. A. Art Productions
- Release date: 14 April 1984
- Country: India
- Language: Tamil

Vaazhkai (pronounced [ʋaːɻkaɪ] transl. Life) is a 1984 Indian Tamil-language drama film, directed by C. V. Rajendran and produced by Chitra Raamu and Chitra Lakshmanan. The film stars Sivaji Ganesan, Ambika and Pandiyan, with Jaishankar, M. N. Nambiar and Raveendran in supporting roles. It is a remake of the Hindi film Avtaar. The film was released on 14 April 1984 and ran for over 100 days in theatres.

== Plot ==
Rajasekar is a hard-working mechanic whose family consists of wife Radha, oldest son Bhaskar, daughter-in-law Sumathi, youngest son Ramesh and adopted son Kannan. Rajasekar loses the use of one arm in an accident at work and, for the first time in his life, finds himself out of work. He wants to use his insurance payout from the accident to buy the family home and pay for Ramesh's education. Bhaskar buys the house but registers it under Sumathi's name rather than his mother's name. Ramesh falls in love with Swapna. Her father, rich businessman Seetharaman, is supportive of the couple but wants Ramesh to live in his home and take charge of his businesses. Rajasekar is skeptical of this arrangement as he is worried about Ramesh being dependent on Seetharaman. Ramesh, however, abandons his parents to live with Swapna. Bhaskar's duplicity also comes to light after a family argument. Utter disappointed in his children, Rajasekar leaves the home with Radha and Kannan. With hard work and determination, Rajasekar becomes a very wealthy man. His sons' fortunes, on the other hand, fall and family is set against each other.

== Cast ==
- Sivaji Ganesan as Rajasekar
- Ambika as Radha
- Pandiyan as Kannan
- Jaishankar as David
- M. N. Nambiar as Seetharaman
- Nizhalgal Ravi as Bhaskar
- Raveendran as Ramesh
- Deepa as Sumathi
- Silk Smitha as Swapna
- V. K. Ramasamy as Baai
- Y. Vijaya as Ayesha
- Manorama as Kannaatha
- Y. G. Mahendran as Anwar
- Thengai Srinivasan
- Shanthi Kumar as a dancer in "Mella Mella Ennai Thottu"

== Soundtrack ==
The music was composed by Ilaiyaraaja. The song "Kaalam Maaralam" is set in Hamsadhvani raga. The song "Mella Mella" is adapted from the background music which Ilaiyaraaja composed for Kannada film Pallavi Anu Pallavi (1983).

Song	Singers	Lyrics	Length
"Ennarumai Selvangal"	S. P. Balasubrahmanyam, S. P. Sailaja, Deepan Chakravarthy	Pulamaipithan	04:21
"Kaalam Maaralaam"	S. P. Balasubrahmanyam, Vani Jairam	Vairamuthu	04:22
"Kattikollava"	P. Jayachandran, Malaysia Vasudevan, S. P. Sailaja	Vairamuthu	04:17
"Manamey Nee"	Ilaiyaraaja	Muthulingam	04:14
"Mella Mella"	P. Susheela, Raj Seetharaman	M. G. Vallabhan	04:02
"Yaavum Neeyappaa"	Malaysia Vasudevan	Panchu Arunachalam	04:22

== Critical reception ==
Jayamanmadhan of Kalki praised the acting of Sivaji Ganesan and other actors but panned Ilaiyaraaja's music and concluded even though it is a film similar to the old films of Ganesan, the film is said to be for the motherland who takes joy in crying. Balumani of Anna praised the acting, music and direction.
