= Jallikattu (1987 film) =

- Theatrical release poster
- Directed by: Manivannan
- Screenplay by: Manivannan
- Story by: Vietnam Veedu Sundaram
- Produced by: Chitra Ramu; Chitra Lakshmanan
- Starring: Sivaji Ganesan; Sathyaraj; Radha; M. N. Nambiar
- Cinematography: A. Sabapathy
- Edited by: Chandran
- Music by: Ilaiyaraaja
- Production company: Seetha Lakshmi Art Films
- Release date: 28 August 1987
- Running time: 140 minutes
- Country: India
- Language: Tamil

Jallikattu (transl. Bull-vaulting) is a 1987 Indian Tamil-language vigilante action film directed by Manivannan. The film stars Sivaji Ganesan, Sathyaraj and Radha. Produced by Chitra Ramu and Chitra Lakshmanan, it was released on 28 August 1987.

== Plot ==
The story begins with Arjun being arrested for multiple crimes. In the past, Arjun was a happy-go-lucky young man. His brother, a factory's union leader, clashed with his superiors for a bonus. In the meantime, Arjun fell in love with Radha. To help the labourers, Arjun cheated the factory's owners as a fake income tax officer, he managed to take all their black money and he gave it to the labourers. The owners of the factory trap Arjun's brother, sister-in-law and his niece in their house. Arjun's sister in-law is raped and the three are killed. Arjun then tried to kill the culprit and failed. Siva Prasad, Radha's brother, advised him to surrender but, being an innocent in this case, he refused. However, Siva Prasad arrested him by surprise. Arjun was then tortured. Therefore, a bald Arjun comes to the court. Despite everything being against Arjun, the judge Ram Prakash feels that he is innocent. So Ram Prakash sentences that Arjun will be under house arrest on his isolated island. Ram Prakash and Arjun slowly begin bonding as friends again and Radha shows up again after being removed from the island and shoots Ram Prakash After few plots, twists and turns, Ram Prakash reveals his motive on choosing Arjun.

Rama Prakash's granddaughter is kidnapped and held at ransom to release a criminal linked to above 3 criminals, and is raped and murdered brutally when Judge Ram Prakash upholds law and sentences the criminal to death by hanging. Ram Prakash trains Arjun well in many skills and the climax gets interesting on how Arjun overtakes his enemies one by one.

== Cast ==
- Sivaji Ganesan as Ram Prakash
- Sathyaraj as Arjun (Half Boil Arumugam/Muttam Chinnappadoss/Kunguma Pottu Gounder/Ramarathinam)
- Radha as Radha (Arukkani)
- M. N. Nambiar as Dheenadalayan
- Janagaraj as Janagaraj
- Vennira Aadai Moorthy as Moorthy
- Malaysia Vasudevan as Neelakandan Numerology
- Captain Raju as Police Commissioner Sivaprasad
- Chitra Lakshmanan as Dharmaraj
- ARS as Lawyer Srinivasan
- Rajasekhar
- Charle as Arjun's Friend
- Kumaresan as Arjun's Friend
- Thyagu as Arjun's Friend
- Veeraraghavan
- Prameela
- John Amirtharaj
- Kutty Padmini as Kutty Amma
- Delhi Ganesh (guest appearance)
- Kokila as Karpagam (guest appearance)
- Prathap K. Pothan (guest appearance)
- Ramya Krishnan as Herself, TV Anchor (guest appearance)

== Production ==
Jallikattu is the first collaboration between Sivaji Ganesan and Manivannan. The dialogues were written by Vietnam Veedu Sundaram.

== Soundtrack ==
The soundtrack was composed by Ilaiyaraaja, with lyrics written by Gangai Amaran.

Song	Singer(s)	Length
"Yethanaiyo"	Mano, S. Janaki	4:24
"Yeriyil Oru"	Malaysia Vasudevan	4:25
"Hey Raja"	S. P. Balasubrahmanyam, Mano	4:31
"Kathi Chandai Poadaamale"	K. S. Chithra	4:22
"Kaadhal Kizhiye"	Mano, S. Janaki	4:53

== Release ==
Jallikattu faced issues with the censor board before release as the board "felt it may show the judiciary in poor light" and the filmmakers made a few cuts. Jallikattu was a commercial success, and the then Tamil Nadu Chief Minister M. G. Ramachandran attended the 100th day celebrations which was his last function before his death on 24 December 1987.

== Reception ==
N. Krishnaswamy of The Indian Express wrote the film "signals some sort of peak in Satyaraj's career. It's screenplay implies that the actor has achieved such a pinnacle of popularity that he can afford to sit down, relax and look around with satisfaction. [Jallikattu] cumulates the popular roles Satyaraj has played till now. It is thus a compendium, a summary of his work". Balumani of Anna praised the acting, dialogues, music and direction. Jayamanmadhan of Kalki felt the ideas for revenge were not that interesting, called Ilayaraja's music as routine and felt Radha was there for namesake but praised Sundaram's writing and felt despite interesting ideas for revenge, it doesn't seem like such a brain-crushing idea to make a judge a fool of himself by trusting in the integrity of those who sent him.
