= Kalavu Thozhirchalai =

- Theatrical Release Poster.
- Directed by: T. Krishnasamy John
- Written by: T. Krishnasamy
- Produced by: S. Ravishankar
- Starring: Kathir; Kushi; Vamsi Krishna; Kalanjiyam
- Cinematography: V. Thyagarajan
- Edited by: Yoga Bhaskar
- Music by: Shyam Benjamin
- Production company: MGK Movie Makers
- Distributed by: Venkeys Film International
- Release date: 22 September 2017
- Running time: 138 Minute
- Country: India
- Language: Tamil

Kalavu Thozhirchalai (transl. Thieving Factory) is a 2017 Indian Tamil-language heist film written and directed by T. Krishnasamy. The film stars Kathir and Kushi aka Rebecca, while Vamsi Krishna, Kalanjiyam, Senthil, and Renuka play pivotal roles. The music was composed by Shyam Benjamin with cinematography by V. Thyagarajan and editing by Yoga Bhaskar. The film began production during 2013 and was released after several delays on 22 September 2017 to mixed reviews from critics.this film is also dubbed in Hindi as Khajana-The Robbery.

== Plot ==
An idol smuggler comes to a village to steal a Shiva idol worth 600 crores. The story begins with an international criminal and idol smuggler named Ram Sanjay arriving at a village in Tanjore with the ulterior motive of smuggling the ancient Maragatha Lingam idol from Marundeeswarar Temple. He enters the temple in the pretext of a journalist who has come to do research on temples. He takes the help of a local guy named Ravi, a small-time thief who steals "Pillayar" idols. Ravi wants to make big money and settle in life with his fiancé Vani. He agrees to go hand-in-glove with Ram, and as per the latter's plan, they steal the heavily guarded Lingam from the temple. Ravi gets his share of the spoils. The ministry now knows that the idol has been missing, so they file a police complaint. The government assigns the case to Irfan, a police officer from the Special Task Force who is assigned to find the culprits. How he solves the case and brings them to books forms the rest.

== Cast ==
- Kathir as 'Sweet' Ravi
- Vamsi Krishna as Ram Sanjay (Suresh Chandran)
- Kalanjiyam as Irfan
- Rebecca (Kushi) as 'Isai' Vani
- Senthil as Pithambaram
- Renuka as Minister of Home Affairs Yesotha Ramakrishnan
- Natraj Pandian as Pandian

== Production ==
Director Krishnasamy revealed that an interview of DSP Kadhar Badsha, who was accused of antique robbery, was the inspiration for the film. The film was shot and ready for release by 2014, but went through production delays. Thus it also became the last film to be shot inside temples in Tamil Nadu since the government does not allow filming inside temples any more.

== Soundtrack ==
The film's music was composed by Shyam Benjamin, while the audio rights of the film was acquired by Saregama. The album released on 15 May 2014 and featured three songs. Shyam Benjamin was chosen after being recommended to the producers by lyricist Muthamil.

Track list
No.	Title	Lyrics	Singer(s)	Length
1.	"Thanjavuru Paaru"	Nandhalala	Haricharan	4:47
2.	"Yedho Yedho"	Annamalai	Naresh Iyer, Rita	4:34
3.	"Oru Nodiyiley"	T. Krishnasamy	Sharanya Gopinath	5:37
Total length:				14:58

== Release and reception ==
Kalavu Thozhirchalai had a theatrical release across Tamil Nadu alongside eight other films, which became the most crowded release date of 2017 in Chennai. The film opened on 22 September 2017. A critic from The Times of India stated that "the best parts of Kalavu Thozhirchalai are the portions when Sanjay and Kathir try to steal the idol" adding that "these scenes are suspenseful and well shot, with the art direction by Murali Ram, especially, lending an authentic feel". The critic then added "however, the rest of the film is more or less a let-down, turning what should have been a thrilling heist movie into a slow-moving film filled with unnecessary sub-plots". Silverscreen.in described it as an "uninspired crime thriller that does not make an effort to engage". The Deccan Chronicle also stated the film moves at a "slow speed with a predictable script".
