= Penn (2006 TV series) =

Indian Tamil-language soap opera

- English: Penn
- Genre: Soap opera
- Screenplay by: Subha
- Directed by: C.J. Baskar
- Starring: Seetha; Meera Vasudevan; Delhi Ganesh; Ajay Rathnam; Viji Chandrasekhar; T. V. Varadarajan; Subhalekha Sudhakar; Vijay Sethupathi
- Theme music composer: Ramkiran Dhina (Title Song); Kiran (Background Score)
- Opening theme: "Nandri Ulla Penne" (Vocals); Nithyasree Mahadevan; Dev Prakash; Jaidev; Vairamuthu (Lyrics)
- Country of origin: India
- Original language: Tamil
- No. of seasons: 1
- No. of episodes: 195

Production
- Producer: Anita Kumaran
- Cinematography: Sharavana Pandian
- Editor: K. Selvamani
- Camera setup: Multi-camera
- Running time: approx. 20-22 minutes per episode
- Production company: Aniksha Productions

Original release
- Network: Sun TV
- Release: 27 February – 24 November 2006

Penn (transl. Girl) is a 2006 Indian Tamil-language soap opera that aired Monday through Friday on Sun TV from 27 February 2006 to 24 November 2006 for 195 episodes.

The show starred Seetha, Meera Vasudevan, Delhi Ganesh, Ajay Rathnam, Viji Chandrasekhar, T. V. Varadarajan, Subhalekha Sudhakar and Dr. Sharmila. It was produced by Aniksha Productions, director by C.J. Baskar. Penn focuses on the hardships that women face in their life.

== Plot ==
The story of Ranganayaki (Seetha) a woman who heads a business empire and Deepa (Meera Vasudevan) is inducted into the family business. Ranganayaki has three kids (bharani, karthik). Kasi is Ranganayaki's driver. On her way from the temple, Ranganayaki encounters deepa jumping into the river, rescues, and admits her in the hospital.

== Cast ==
- Seetha as Ranganayaki
- Meera Vasudevan as Deepa/Anjali
- Delhi Ganesh as Kasi
- Ajay Rathnam as Bhadri
- Viji Chandrasekhar as Kalavathi (Kala)
- Vijay Sethupathi as Bharani
- Attakathi Dinesh as Karthik
- T. V. Varadarajan
- Subhalekha Sudhakar as Muthukumar
- Dr. Sharmila as Uma
- Sanjeev as Solaiyappan "Solai"
- Prajin as Kailash
- Supriya as Poongudi
- Latharao as Mohini
- Dev Anand Sharma /Muralidharan
- K. Manokar
- Iswarya as Swathi
- Rama
- Sangetha Balan
- Raj Madhan
- Nirmala as Chitra
- Kiruthika
- Sabitha Anand as Anandhi, Ranganayaki's sister (Cameo)

== Original soundtrack ==
=== Title song ===
It was written by lyricist Vairamuthu, composed by the music director Ramkiran Dhina. It was sung by Nithyasree Mahadevan, Dev Prakash and Jaidev.

=== Soundtrack ===
Track list
No.	Title	Lyrics	Singer(s)	Length
1.	"Nandri Ulla Penne (நன்றி உள்ள பெண்ணே)"	Vairamuthu	Nithyasree Mahadevan, Dev Prakash, Jaidev	3:22
2.	"Jinguchaku (ஜிங்குச்சாக்கு)"	Vairamuthu	Sujatha Mohan	2:13
3.	"Thaiyaval Seiyaval (தாயவள் செய்வாள் )"	Vairamuthu	KK	3:00

== See also ==
- List of programs broadcast by Sun TV
