= Renuka (actress) =

Indian television and film actress (born 1964)

- Born: Tiruchirappalli Srirangam, Tiruchirappalli, Tamil Nadu, India
- Occupations: Film and Television Actress
- Years active: 1985–present
- Spouse: Aloha Kumaran (m. 1998)

Renuka is an Indian actress who is known for playing the lead role Premi in K. Balachander's Tamil tele-serial of the same name. She has also acted in Malayalam and some Telugu films.

== Early life ==
Renuka's family hailed from the town of Srirangam. Due to adverse circumstances caused by the early death of her father, she was compelled to move to the city of Chennai at an early age in search of work. In a short while, she was able to get a job as a drama artiste with Komal Swaminathan's troupe.

== Career ==
She got the break in Tamil films with the 1989 movie Samsara Sangeetham directed by T. Rajender and in the year 1990, she worked in Malayalam movie Kuttettan. Renuka has worked in a few Tamil films and about 75 Malayalam movies, after she was introduced to Tamil film director K. Balachander by colleague Geetha.

Renuka was cast in a supporting role in the teleserial Kaialavu Manasu directed by Balachander. Following Kaialavu Manasu, Renuka also did a supporting role in Kadhal Pagadai, which made her very popular and lead roles in Premi, Jannal and Ganga Yamuna Saraswati. She also earned good reviews for her performance in Premi.

== Personal life ==
Renuka is the eldest daughter in the family and has two younger brothers. In 1998, she married Aloha Kumaran, the chairman and managing director of Aloha India.

== Filmography ==
Year	Title	Role	Language	Notes
1985	Porutham		Tamil	
1988	Maduraikara Thambi		Tamil	
1988	En Thangai Kalyani		Tamil	credited as Renu
1989	Samsara Sangeetham		Tamil	
1990	Thangaikku Oru Thalattu	Kasthuri (Stella)	Tamil	
1990	Kuttettan	Thomas Chacko's girlfriend	Malayalam	
1990	Brahma Rakshass	Karthika	Malayalam	
1991	Adwaytham	Krishnan Kutty Menon's wife	Malayalam	
1991	Abhimanyu	Savithri	Malayalam	
1991	Pudhu Nellu Pudhu Naathu	Thaayamma	Tamil	
1991	Tholi Poddu		Telugu	
1992	Congratulations Miss Anitha Menon		Malayalam	
1992	Aval Ariyadhe	Dr. Sumam	Malayalam	
1992	Thevar Magan	Anni	Tamil	
1992	Chinna Marumagal	Shanthi	Tamil	
1992	Sugamana Sumaigal	Kalyani	Tamil	
1992	Sargam	Kunjulakshmi	Malayalam	
1992	Kudumbasammetham	Devu	Malayalam	
1992	Daddy	Alice	Malayalam	
1993	Sthreedhanam	Vidya's sister	Malayalam	
1993	Mafia	Uma	Malayalam	
1993	Butterflies	Saradha	Malayalam	
1993	Vatsalyam	Ambika	Malayalam	
1993	Ammayane Sathyam	Parvathi's mother	Malayalam	
1993	Theeram Thedunna Thirakal		Malayalam	
1993	Chenkol		Malayalam	
1993	Porutham		Malayalam	
1993	Periyamma		Tamil	
1993	Thiruda Thiruda	Seethalakshmi	Tamil	
1993	Rojavai Killathe	Sathasivam's wife	Tamil	
1993	Asadhyuraalu		Telugu	
1994	Kudumba Vishesham	Urmila	Malayalam	
1994	Chukkan	Leela	Malayalam	
1994	Rajadhani	Parvathy's sister	Malayalam	
1994	Pavithram	Nirmala Ramakrishnan(Nimmy)	Malayalam	
1994	Commissioner		Malayalam	
1994	Magalir Mattum	Pandian's wife	Tamil	
1995	Achan Kombathu Amma Varampathu	Sumithra	Malayalam	
1995	Nirnayam	Rajan's wife	Malayalam	
1995	Thakshashila	Sheela Nambiar	Malayalam	
1995	Chantha	Sherly	Malayalam	
1995	Agrajan	Kunjulakshmi	Malayalam	
1996	Kalki	Karpagam	Tamil	
1996	Mahathma	Ramakrishna Kurup's daughter	Malayalam	
1996	Sathyabhaamaykkoru Pranayalekhanam	Thatri	Malayalam	
1996	The Prince	Indhu	Malayalam	
1996	Meghasangeehtam		Malayalam	
1997	Guru	Ramanagan's sister	Malayalam	
1997	Bharatheeyam	Sebastian's wife	Malayalam	
1997	Aattuvela	Sugandhi	Malayalam	
1997	Vamsam		Malayalam	
1998	Samaantharangal	Raziya	Malayalam	
1998	Chitrashalabham	Geetha	Malayalam	
1998	Dhinamdhorum	Chandra	Tamil	
2006	Azhagai Irukkirai Bayamai Irukkirathu	Malar	Tamil	
2006	Poi	Menaka	Tamil	
2008	Mizhikal Sakshi	Ambili's mother	Malayalam	
2008	De Ingottu Nokkiye	Sathyabhama	Malayalam	
2009	Quick Gun Murugan	Kidnapped Mum	English	
2009	Ayan	Kaveri Velusamy	Tamil	Nominated, Filmfare Award for Best Supporting Actress – Tamil
2009	Guru En Aalu	Guru's mother	Tamil	
2011	Sweet Home	Arun's mother	Tamil	Short film
2012	Chattakaari	Sasi's mother	Malayalam	
2012	Gramam	Thankam	Malayalam	
2013	Alex Pandian	Rani	Tamil	
2013	Mathapoo	Karthik's mother	Tamil	
2013	Vanakkam Chennai	Ajay's mother	Tamil	
2013	Kaanchi	Bhagheerathi Amma	Malayalam	
2014	Namma Gramam	Thankam	Tamil	
2014	Kerala Nattilam Pengaludane	Unnikrishnan's mother	Tamil	
2014	Nalanum Nandhiniyum	Rajalakshmi	Tamil	
2014	Aindhaam Thalaimurai Sidha Vaidhiya Sigamani	Sigamani's mother	Tamil	
2014	Poojai	Manimekalai	Tamil	
2014	Thirudan Police	Vishwa's mother	Tamil	
2015	Kanchana 2	Nandhini's sister-in-law	Tamil	
2015	Vasuvum Saravananum Onna Padichavanga	Kamatchi	Tamil	
2015	Adhibar	Sia's mother	Tamil	
2016	Vetrivel	Sharatha	Tamil	
2017	Pokkiri Simon	Mahalakshmi	Malayalam	
2017	Kalavu Thozhirchalai	Yesotha Ramakrishnan	Tamil	
2017	Karuppan	Karuppan's mother	Tamil	
2018	Seyal	Karthik's mother	Tamil	
2018	Koothan	Actress	Tamil	
2018	Kalavani Mappillai	Deva's mother	Tamil	
2019	Dev	Geetha	Tamil	
2019	Dhanusu Raasi Neyargale	Pandiamma	Tamil	
2020	Psycho	Vasantha	Tamil	
2021	Kalathil Santhippom	Anand's mother	Tamil	
2021	Theerpugal Virkapadum	Dr. Aruna Stephen Raj	Tamil	
2022	Anbarivu	Arivu's aunty	Tamil	
2022	Ranga	Adithya's mother	Tamil	
2022	Vattam	Mano's mother	Tamil	
2022	Cobra	Bhavana's mother	Tamil	
2022	Therkathi Veeran	Sarath's mother	Tamil	
2023	Kathar Basha Endra Muthuramalingam	Ayesha	Tamil	
2023	Annapoorani	Saradha	Tamil	
2024	Indian 2	Kanagalatha Thangavel	Tamil	
2025	Maareesan	Dhayalan's mother	Tamil	

== Television ==
Year	Title	Role	Channel
1996-1997	Premi	Premi	Sun TV
1996	Kaiyalavu Manasu	Manjula	Sun TV
1996	Air Bus		Rajasri Tamil
	Vaai Sollil Veeranadi		
	Pournami		
	Jannal Veettin Kankal		
	Sevvai Kizhamai		
	Oru Koodai Pasam		
	Vilakku Vekkum Neram (Malayalam)		DD Malayalam
	Aa Amma (Malayalam)		Kairali TV
1998	Jannal-Sila Nijangal Sila Nyayangal		Sun TV
1996-1998	Kadhal Pagadai	Girija	Sun TV
1998-2000	Ganga Yamuna Saraswati		Raj TV
1999	Kasalavu Nesam		Sun TV
2003-2004	Sahana Sindhu Bairavi Part-II	Meera	Jaya TV
2008	Ganga Yamuna Saraswathy Sangamam		SUN TV
2008-2009	Sivasakthi	Sivagami	SUN TV
2011-2012	Parinayam (Malayalam)	Second mother of heroine	Mazhavil Manorama
2012-2014	Amudha Oru Aacharyakuri	Amutha (female lead role)	Kalaignar TV
2013–2013	Naduvula Konjam Thukkatha Kaanum	(Female lead role)	Singapore Tamil drama broadcast on MediaCorp Vasantham
2014–2015	Nenjathai Killadhe		Zee Tamil

=== Web series ===
Year	Title	Role	Network
2022	Paper Rocket	Valliamma	ZEE5

== Plays ==
- Thanneer Thanneer
- Naliravil Petrom
- Irutile Thedatheenga
