= Gayathri Films =

Indian film company

- Company type: Film production Film distribution
- Industry: Entertainment
- Founded: 1983
- Headquarters: Chennai, India
- Key people: Chithra Ramu; Chitra Lakshmanan
- Products: Motion pictures (Tamil)

Gayathri Films was an Indian film production and distribution company headed by Chithra Ramu and Chitra Lakshmanan.

== History ==
Gayathri Films was one of the several production companies used by brothers Chitra Lakshmanan and Chithra Ramu as a part of their involvement in Tamil cinema. Notable films made as a part of the studio included Mann Vasanai (1983) and Soora Samhaaram (1988). Chithra Ramu died in 2017.

== Filmography ==
Title	Year	Language	Director	Cast	Synopsis	Ref.
Mann Vasanai	1983	Tamil	Bharathiraja	Pandiyan, Revathi, Vijayan		
Vaazhkai	1984	Tamil	C. V. Rajendran	Sivaji Ganesan, Ambika, Pandiyan		
Soora Samhaaram	1988	Tamil	Chithra Lakshmanan	Kamal Haasan, Nirosha, Nizhalgal Ravi		
Periya Thambi	1997	Tamil	Chithra Lakshmanan	Prabhu, Nagma, Goundamani		
Chinna Raja	1999	Tamil	Chithra Lakshmanan	Karthik, Roja, Priya Raman		
