= Oru Murai Sollividu =

- Poster
- Directed by: A. Jawahar
- Starring: Rohit; Janapriya; Yugendran; Radha Ravi
- Music by: Bharadwaj
- Production company: Kamakshi Amman Creations
- Release date: 1 October 2004
- Country: India
- Language: Tamil

Oru Murai Sollividu (transl. Say it one time) is a 2004 Indian Tamil-language romantic drama film directed by A. Jawahar. The film stars Rohit and Janapriya in lead roles with Yugendran and Radha Ravi in pivotal supporting roles. The film marks the film debut of Rohit and the Tamil film debut of Janapriya. This is Jawahar's second film after Maaran (2002).

== Plot ==
Venkat is a college student and the son of a retired military official. He is in love with Dr. Priya. Priya tells him about her dark past and how her former lover fell off a balcony. Vankat's father arranges Venkat's marriage with another woman (Sushmita). Dr. Sundar is also in love with Priya, but it is a one-sided love.

== Cast ==
- Rohit as Venkat
- Janapriya as Priya
- Yugendran as Sundar
- Radha Ravi as Venkat's father
- Sushmitha as Venkat's bride
- Vadivelu as Harichandran
- S. S. Chandran
- Gandhimathi
- Singamuthu
- Murthy

== Production ==
Rohit, son of S. S. Chandran, made his film debut with this film. He had initially intended to make his debut through a film titled Royal Family in 2001, and then through Kolagalam in 2003, but neither film materialised. Sunitha Varma made her Tamil debut with this film under the name Janapriya.

== Soundtrack ==
The soundtrack was composed by Bharadwaj.

Song title	Singers	Lyrics	Duration
"Eppadi Solvathu"	P. Unnikrishnan, Chinmayi	Thamarai	5:58
"Kattunaakka Ivala Kattu"	Karthik, Mahathi	Snehan	4:54
"I Love You Solli"	Tippu, Pop Shalini	Pa. Vijay	4:16
"Muthathaala Yudhangalum"	Anand, Sangeetha Pradeep	Snehan	4:15
"Enna Kichu Kichu"	Srinivas, Lavanya Sundararaman	Piraisoodan	4:26

== Reception ==
Sify gave the film a negative review and wrote that "Rohith has worked on his emotions, dance and fights but has a long way to go while Jana Priya looks pretty. Yogendran and Radha Ravi are ok while Vadivelu's comedy is good. Jawahar's second attempt at direction is not impressive and the film is missable". Malini Mannath of Chennai Online wrote, "So one does not go with any great expectations to view the film and if it turns out to be an also-ran, it's just what one expected".

== Awards ==
2004 Tamil Nadu State Film Awards

- Best Male Character Artiste - Radha Ravi
- Best Comedian - Gandhimathi
