= Kadhal Pagadai =

- காதல் பகடை
- Genre: Drama; Romance
- Written by: K. Balachander
- Story by: Ananthu
- Directed by: K. Balachander
- Starring: Rahman; Mohini; Roopa Sree; Yuvarani; T. V. Varadarajan; Renuka; Venu Arvind; Deepa Venkat; Mohan V. Ram; Kavithalaya Krishnan; Vatsala Rajagopal; Geetha
- Theme music composer: V. R. Sampathselvan
- Opening theme: Kadhalenna Pagadai Kaaiya by K. Prabhakar
- Country of origin: India
- Original language: Tamil
- No. of episodes: 60

Production
- Producers: B. Kailasam, Geetha B. Kailasam
- Cinematography: C. S. Ravibabu
- Camera setup: Multi-camera
- Running time: approx. 29-30 minutes per episode
- Production company: Kavithalaya Productions

Original release
- Network: Sun TV
- Release: 14 December 1996 – 28 February 1998

Kadhal Pagadai (transl. The Love Dice) is a 1996 Indian Tamil soap opera aired on Sun TV. The show was directed by veteran Tamil film director K. Balachander. The show stars Rahman and Mohini making their appearances in a television series for first time with T. V. Varadarajan, Renuka, Venu Arvind, Kavithalaya Krishnan, Vatsala Rajagopal and Mohan V. Ram portraying supporting roles. That serial has both comedy and romance and was shot in a residential neighbourhood called Konar Colony.

== Plot ==
Kadhal Pagadai revolves around middle-class families in Konar Colony, in Chennai, in the late 1990s. The show showcases the struggles revolving in middle-class families and the youngsters love live, through emotional outbursts, with comic reliefs here and there. Though there is no main characters, the story mainly revolves around a family living in Konar Colony. The family is led by Mohanbabu, a clerk in a government office, though his wife Vanja is the one leading the family as the only woman. Mohanbabu younger brother, Rajbabu, is a clerk in a chit fund company. He has a girlfriend named Sithara, who is an orphan. Rajbabu hides this fact from his family, as he want to settle first before marrying Sithara. But Sithara's flashback from her college days involving Ramana, forces Rajbabu to introduce her to his family, and his elder sister, Girija gets an instant dislike for Sithara. Girija comes down to Chennai from Saudi, seeking money from her brothers, to release her husband from jail back in Saudi. At the same time, Rajbabu losses the chitfund money, due to a sinister plan laid by his office peon, Sanjeevi. Ramana comes forward to offer money to help Rajbabu and Sithara but has a condition that Sithara should stay with him in his Cunnor Estate for 10 days. If Sithara stills loves Rajbabu after their mutual stay, Ramana would not trouble them anymore. Having faith in Sithara and desperately in need for money, Rajbabu convinces a reluctant Sithara to go with Ramana. But soon, his faith turns into a possessive behavior and Rajbabu refuses to trust Sithara.

Though, this is the main gist of the plot, Kadhal Pagadai also revolves around other families in the Colony. One such family is the ultra rich and arrogant woman who bought the house that she stayed in. A strict old man with 2 daughters, who is the only man in the colony to have a telephone, which irritates him as he has to pass messages to the people in the colony. His elder daughter, Nandhini who loves her neighbour, a mechanic and the duo runs away when her father opposes. A Palakad Brahmin family, who is one of the main comic relief in the show. A disabled helper around the colony, named Ayyappan. A struggling cinema actor, also a fraud, with whom Sithara's friend Sundari was in love with, but breaks up after knowing his fraudulent nature.

How all these families overcome their daily challenges? Would Ramana win Sithara's heart? Or would Rajbabu and Sithara unite again? forms the climax.

== Cast ==
Main

- Rahman as Ramana
- Mohini as Sithara
- Venu Arvind as Raj Babu
- T. V. Varadarajan as Mohan Babu
- Renuka as Vanaja
- Geetha as Girija

Supporting

- Mohan V. Ram as Palakkad Kasi Viswanatha Harihara Mahadevan
- Kavithalaya Krishnan as Ayyappa
- Vatsala Rajagopal as Mahadevan's mother
- A. R. S. as Yamuna's father
- Baby Deepika as Yamuna's sister
- Yuvarani as Yamuna
- Roopa Sree as Thangam
- Deepa Venkat as Prema (Mahadevan's daughter)
- Suresh B. E. as Mahadevan's son
- Judge Rajagopal as Mahadevan's father
- K. R. Vatsala as Agalya
- Madurai Rajamani as Nandhini and Thangam's father
- Dhamu as K. T. Thirumalai
- Shanthi Ganesh as Thirumalai's wife
- T.S.Anandhi as Indira
- Vasuki as Nandhini
- Marthandan as Nair
- S. R. Sivagami as Kaamu
- Golden Suresh as Rajkumar
- Veerapandiyan as Kamalkanth
- Vasanth as himself
- Madhan Bob as doctor
- Sudha Chandran as herself

== Soundtrack ==
- Kadhalenna Pagadai - K. Prabhakar, Deepika
- Swarame Swarame - Unnikrishnan
- Poonthendrale Nee Poi - Unnikrishnan
- Penmaiye - Unnikrishnan

== See also ==
- List of programs broadcast by Sun TV
- List of TV shows aired on Sun TV (India)
