= Chinna Raja =

- Title card
- Directed by: Chitra Lakshmanan
- Written by: M. Rathnakumar (dialogues)
- Screenplay by: Chitra Lakshmanan
- Story by: Chitra Lakshmanan
- Produced by: Chitra Ramu
- Starring: Karthik; Roja; Priya Raman
- Cinematography: Karthik Raja
- Edited by: Chandran
- Music by: Deva
- Production company: Gayathri Films
- Release date: 5 March 1999
- Country: India
- Language: Tamil

Chinna Raja is a 1999 Indian Tamil-language action thriller film directed and produced by Chitra Lakshmanan. The film stars Karthik in the dual lead role alongside Roja and Priya Raman. It was released on 5 March 1999.

== Cast ==
- Karthik as Raja and Dilip (dual role)
- Roja as Radha
- Priya Raman as Priya
- Manivannan as Mani
- Dhamu
- Ramesh Khanna
- Mohan Raman
- Manobala
- Vaiyapuri
- Jaishankar
- Sowcar Janaki
- Chitra Lakshmanan
- Seshadri as Child Raja

== Production ==
The lead female role was initially meant to be played by Pooja Kumar.

== Soundtrack ==
The soundtrack was composed by Deva.

Song	Singers	Lyrics	Length
"Anbe Anbe"	P. Unnikrishnan	Arivumathi	05:15
"Hoi Hoi Hoi"	Swarnalatha, Sujatha	Kalidasan	04:10
"Paadavaa"	Hariharan	Kalidasan	05:38
"Puyale Vaa"	Nithyasree Mahadevan, Krishnaraj	Kalidasan	05:27
"Yenna Yenna"	Gopal Rao	Kalidasan	04:45

== Release and reception ==
The film was initially scheduled to release in October 1998, two months after the release of the Karthik-Roja starrer Unnidathil Ennai Koduthen, to coincide with Diwali. However, it was delayed for four months and eventually released on 5 March 1999. D. S. Ramanujam of The Hindu wrote, "After gaining a lively pace in the first portion with humorous situations, Gayathri Films' Chinna Raja becomes a murder mystery. The twists director Chitra Lakshmanan (he also plays a brief role) employs, manages to pull the movie through".
