= Iruvar Mattum =

- Promotional poster
- Directed by: Dwaraki Raghavan
- Written by: Dwaraki Raghavan; T. Krishnakumar (dialogues)
- Produced by: R. Jagadish
- Starring: Abhay; Sunitha Varma
- Cinematography: P. K. H. Das
- Edited by: Suresh Urs
- Music by: Vijay Antony (Songs); S. P. Venkatesh (Score)
- Production company: V. R. Miracle Movie
- Release date: 30 November 2006
- Running time: 130 minutes
- Country: India
- Language: Tamil

Iruvar Mattum (transl. Only two persons) is a 2006 Indian Tamil language thriller film directed by Dwaraki Raghavan. The film stars Abhay and Sunitha Varma. The film, produced by R. Jagadish, was released on 30 November 2006.

== Plot ==
The film begins with an old couple going back to the forest to retrace their roots.

In a flashback, the hermit Azhagu (Abhay) lived in a wooden house in the forest. He ate only fruits and loved to take care of the wild animals. The carefree college student Selvi (Sunitha Varma) ran away from her house after her parents prepared her marriage with a man she did not like and she lost her way in the forest. Once night has fallen, she entered Azhagu's house to sleep and met the eccentric Azhagu. The next day, Selvi realized that he was different and loved his mother than anything. Selvi then begged him to get her out of the forest, but during the walk, the way was blocked by fallen trees and she turned back. Selvi stayed in Azhagu's house, and the two squabbled like children over small things, but they eventually fell in love with each other and Selvi could not leave the place. They decided to get married, so Azhagu introduced her to his mother, who turns out to be skeletal remains of her. A shocked Selvi tries to run away from Azhagu, but he abducted her and tied the knot with her. Selvi then tried to escape for a second time; during the run, she was wounded and Azhagu took care of her. Selvi tried to reason with Azhagu, but he became aggressive and strongly believed that his mother was still alive. Selvi made him believe that his mother will be reborn in her belly; thus, she became pregnant and gave birth to a baby.

Back to the present, the old couple is none other than Azhagu and Selvi. Selvi makes fun of Azhagu, who has now recovered from his mental illness, and they both laugh.

== Cast ==
- Abhay as Azhagu Sundaram
- Sunitha Varma as Selvi

== Production ==
Kannada director Dwaraki Raghava, credited as Dwarki Raghavan, made his directorial debut in Tamil with By 2, an experimental film which featured just two characters. Kannada actor Srinagara Kitty, credited as Abhay, was selected to play the hero while Sunitha Varma played his love interest. The film was shot in the deep jungles of Tamil Nadu, Kerala and Karnataka around 60 days. A bungalow with waterfalls as backdrop was built at Athirapalli falls at Kerala.

== Soundtrack ==
The soundtrack was composed by Vijay Antony.

Song	Singer(s)	Lyrics	Duration
"Azhaga Azhaga"	Sadhana Sargam, Hariharan	Vairamuthu	5:15
"Unnai Paartha"	Sangeetha Rajeshwaran	Vairamuthu	3:50
"Poovin Madiyil"	Sadhana Sargam, Hariharan	Vairamuthu	3:55
"Nenjil Enna"	Dwaraki Raghavan, Chaitra H. G.	Dwaraki Raghavan	2:14
"Roja Poovin"	Hariharan, Sadhana Sargam	Vairamuthu	3:00
"En Kaal Gal"	Chaitra H. G.	Vairamuthu	4:49

== Reception ==
Sify said, "the film drags as two characters get on to your nerves. Still, if you like to try out something different, then Iruvar Matttum is worth a glance". S. R. Ashok Kumar of The Hindu wrote, "The thought is good and novel but the presentation could have been more sophisticated and refined" and praised the technical crew. Lajjavathi of Kalki wrote opting for a different story, the director has struggled to move the screenplay with only two characters, it misses vigour. A new effort can be appreciated but the team of Iruvar Mattum should understand that effort alone does not bring success.
