= Munthirikkaadu =

- Theatrical release poster
- Directed by: Kalanjiyam
- Written by: Kalanjiyam
- Produced by: Kalanjiyam
- Starring: Seeman; Pugazh Mahendran; Subapriya Malar; C. H. Jaya Rao
- Music by: A. K. Priyan
- Production company: Aathi Thiraikalam
- Distributed by: VV Pictures
- Release date: 7 April 2023
- Running time: 159 minutes
- Country: India
- Language: Tamil

Munthirikkaadu (transl. Cashew forest) is a 2023 Indian Tamil-language crime thriller film written and directed by Kalanjiyam, and produced by him under the banner of Aathi Thiraikalam. The film stars Seeman, Pugazh Mahendran, Subapriya and Jaya Rao. Munthirikkaadu was released worldwide theatrically on 7 April 2023.

== Plot ==
In a rural Tamil Nadu village surrounded by cashew forests, a dominant-caste youth group routinely carries out honour killings of inter-caste couples, with the tacit approval of the local community. Deivam, a young woman from the dominant caste who aspires to become an IAS officer, and Sella, a young man from an oppressed caste who dreams of joining the police force, develop a close friendship. Members of the dominant-caste group falsely accuse them of being in a romantic relationship and subject both to physical assault and harassment. Under this pressure, their friendship gradually turns into love. The group then decides to kill Sella, while the village collectively resolves to carry out an honour killing of Deivam. Inspector Anbarasan investigates the escalating caste violence and previous honour killings in the area. The film follows the couple’s struggle for survival amid the rigid caste hierarchy and the community’s response to their relationship.

== Cast ==
- Seeman as Inspector Anbarasan
- Pugazh Mahendran as Sella
- Subapriya as Deivam
- C.H. Jayarao as Murugan
- Kalai Sekaran
- Palamedu Parthipan
- Sakthivel
- Pradeep

== Production ==
Kalanjiyam revealed that the film is based on the lives of people in cashew forests and it depicts the tribulations they face.

== Music ==
The films soundtrack is composed by A. K. Priyan.

Track listing
No.	Title	Lyrics	Singer(s)	Length
1.	"Paithiyam"	Kavi Baskar	Maalavika Sundar	5:16
2.	"Uyire Uyire"	Kavi Baskar	Srivardhani Kuchi	4:56
3.	"Kadhalai Kollum"	Ilayakamban	Jayamoorthy	4:52
4.	"Kadhalai Kollum" (Reprise)	Ilayakamban	Murugavel	5:26
5.	"Penne En Kanne"	Kavi Baskar	Sooraj Santhosh, Vandana Srinivasan	4:45
Total length:				24:36

== Reception ==
A critic form Cinema Vikatan wrote that Munthirikkaadu would have been a noteworthy work of the times if more attention had been paid to the screenplay and character design, and if the caste dominance in a village had been analysed in depth and incorporated into the screenplay. Yuvasri of ABP Nadu stated that had the point been made a little more emphatically, Munthirikkaadu film would have attracted many people's attention, and gave 1.5 ratings out of 5.
