= Asmitha Neelamegam =

Makeup artist, former actress

- Born: 29 February 1992
- Other name: Ashmitha
- Spouse: Shri Vishnu NP
- Children: 3
- Relatives: Divya Neelamegam (sister)

Asmitha Neelamegam, also known as Ashmitha, is a makeup artist and former actress from Chennai, who does bridal make up.

== Early life and career ==
Neelamegam started her career as a child at the age of 13 in Asianet's “Ceylon Salon,” a comedy show in Tamil that she anchored. She has played lead actor roles in four movies. Some of her ad films include her works with Pothys, Sree Kumaran Thanga Maligai, Aavin, etc. Neelamegam is also currently married to Shrivishnu, and has three children.

Asmitha did not find success in her movie Karungali as the movie was quite taxing and extremely crude with explicit adult content. She acted in few more movies but they too were flops. Later, she made a shift to pursue makeup as her career.

Her academy space opened up for students in the year 2018 in Saligramam, Chennai. Over 12,000 students have taken courses to learn self-grooming, start businesses. She later on acted with her husband in a music video.

== Personal life ==
Ashmita's husband, Vishnu, publicly acknowledged that he had engaged in an extramarital affair, a claim to which Ashmita concurred. He further alleged that Ashmita was also involved in an illicit relationship, an accusation she denied, instead leveling similar allegations against Vishnu. Despite these personal disputes, the couple had, for several years, maintained a public image of a harmonious and affectionate relationship by regularly sharing romantic videos on social media platforms. This apparent contradiction has led many viewers to feel misled. Subsequently, Ashmita published a statement expressing concern that the controversy is having a detrimental impact on her professional career.

== Filmography ==
Year	Title	Role	Notes
2008	Sadhu Miranda		Child artist; uncredited
2010	Villalan		
2011	Karungali	Sengudi	
2011	Thenkasi Pakkathula		
2016	Pazhaya Vannarapettai		
2022	Kangana and the Curious Wife		Music video
