= Agaya Gangai (film) =

- Title card
- Directed by: Manobala
- Written by: Manivannan
- Produced by: M. Nachiappan
- Starring: Karthik; Suhasini
- Cinematography: Robert–Rajasekar
- Edited by: R. Bhaskaran
- Music by: Ilaiyaraaja
- Production company: Sreeni Enterprises
- Release date: 17 December 1982
- Country: India
- Language: Tamil

Agaya Gangai (transl. Sky Ganges) is a 1982 Indian Tamil-language romance film, directed by Manobala in his directorial debut and written by Manivannan. The film stars Karthik and Suhasini. It was released on 17 December 1982, and was a box office failure.

== Plot ==
Murali moves in as a tenant to Arumugam's house and befriends his daughter, Sumathi. The two are instantly attracted to each other. Sumathi is falling in love with Murali but withdraws as she's unsure of his intentions and is wary after hearing her cousin Janaki's own failed love story. Murali is confused and hurt by her mixed signals. Selvi is Aandal's daughter and is a playful young woman that does odd jobs for the families living in the house. When her mother dies suddenly, Murali steps up to care for her and Selvi assumes he loves her. The film focuses on the two's love triangle and how it is ultimately resolved.

== Cast ==
- Karthik as Murali
- Suhasini as Sumathi
- Usha Rajendar as Selvi
- Goundamani as Arumugam
- S. N. Parvathy as Sumathi's mother
- Kamala Kamesh as Aandal
- Vadivukkarasi as Janaki Gopal
- Thyagu as Gopal
- Senthil

== Soundtrack ==
The music was composed by Ilaiyaraaja.

Song	Singers	Lyrics	Length
"Mama Mama"	S. P. Sailaja	Gangai Amaran	04:20
"Mega Deepam"	Malaysia Vasudevan	Na. Kamarasan	04:09
"Pongum Agaya Gangai"	S. Janaki, Gangai Amaran	Vairamuthu	04:13
"Then Aruviyil"	S. P. Balasubrahmanyam, S. Janaki	Mu. Metha	04:54

== Critical reception ==
Thiraignani of Kalki praised Manivannan's writing and Manobala's direction but felt the drama of extending the love triangle like a telegraph wires makes you forget some of the good scenes in the film.
