= Nesam =

- Poster
- Directed by: K. Subash
- Written by: K. Subash; Manivannan (Dialogues )
- Produced by: K. Subash
- Starring: Ajith Kumar; Maheswari
- Cinematography: S. Bernard
- Edited by: Krishnamoorthy; Siva
- Music by: Deva
- Production company: Dhanooja Films
- Release date: 15 January 1997
- Running time: 139 minutes
- Country: India
- Language: Tamil

Nesam (/neɪsəm/ transl. Affection) is a 1997 Indian Tamil-language romantic comedy film written and directed by K. Subash. The film stars Ajith Kumar and Maheswari in the lead roles, while Goundamani, Senthil and Manivannan among others play other pivotal roles.

Nesam was released on 15 January 1997 and became a commercial failure.

== Cast ==
- Ajith Kumar as Ranganathan
- Maheswari as Madhu
- Goundamani as Narasimman
- Manivannan as Muthuvel Arunachalam
- Senthil as Thanikachalam
- Sathyapriya as Madhu's mother
- Manobala as Telephone booth owner
- Subhalekha Sudhakar as Vaitheeshwara Moorthy
- Vichu Viswanath as Muthuvel Arunachalam's assistant
- Visu in a special appearance as himself
- Pandu in a special appearance
- Jyothi Lakshmi in a special appearance
- Jyothi Meena in a special appearance
- Shakeela in a special appearance

== Soundtrack ==
Music was composed by Deva.

Track listing
No.	Title	Lyrics	Singer(s)	Length
1.	"O Ranganatha"	Palani Bharathi	S. P. Balasubrahmanyam, K. S. Chithra	5:00
2.	"Kundrathile"	Ponniyin Selvan	Sabesh	5:04
3.	"Madonna Varuvala"	Palani Bharathi	Mano, Swarnalatha	5:06
4.	"Natchathira Bangla"	Palani Bharathi	Deva, Subha	5:03
5.	"Thuli Thuli"	Palani Bharathi	Mano, Mary George	5:59
Total length:				26:12

== Release and reception ==
R. P. R. of Kalki praised Manivannan's dialogues and Goundamani's comedy but panned the acting of Ajith and Maheswari and concluded the makers tried to create a rice out of mixing everything. Two years after release, the producers were given a ₹5 lakh subsidy by the then Tamil Nadu Chief Minister M. Karunanidhi along with ten other films.
