= Sunitha Varma =

Indian actress

Sunitha Varma Alluri
- Born: Sunitha Varma; Visakhapatnam, Andhra Pradesh, India
- Other name: Radha Varma (in Malayalam cinema)
- Occupations: Actor; Model
- Years active: 2001–2016

Sunitha Varma Alluri is a former Indian actress who worked in the South Indian film industries. She has been appearing in feature films in Telugu, Malayalam and Tamil films along with a few Kannada films for over a decade, since her debut in Neevente Nuventa (2001).

== Career ==
In 2001, she made her film debut through the Telugu film Neevente Nuventa and went on to act in a few more Telugu movies. She made her debut in Tamil cinema 2005 Oru Murai Sollividu under the stagen name Janapriya, which went unnoticed. She again reverted to her original name and acted in further Tamil films including the crime thriller 6'2 opposite Sathyaraj, and the experimental film Iruvar Mattum which features only two characters.

She changed her name to Radha Varma and made her Malayalam film debut by starring with Dileep in the successful 2008 comedy film Crazy Gopalan.

== Filmography ==
Year	Film	Role	Language	Notes
2001	Neevente Nenunta		Telugu	Debut as a lead actress
2002	Fans		Telugu	
2002	Priyadarshini	Lalitha	Telugu	
2003	Utsaham	Vennela	Telugu	
2003	Seetayya		Telugu	
2003	Ottesi Cheputunna		Telugu	
2004	Naa Autograph Sweet Memories		Telugu	
2004	Oru Murai Sollividu	Dr. Priya	Tamil	Credited as Janapriya
2005	6'2	Aishwarya	Tamil	
2006	Ashoka		Kannada	
2006	Iruvar Mattum	Selvi	Tamil	
2007	Piragu	Sofia	Tamil	
2007	Snehanjali	Preethi	Kannada	
2008	Crazy Gopalan	Diana	Malayalam	
2009	Dr. Patient	Rakhi Devadas	Malayalam	
2010	Again Kasargod Khader Bhai	Anna Kareena / Razia	Malayalam	
2011	Seniors	Fathima	Malayalam	
2011	Karungali	Dr. Kanimozhi	Tamil	
2012	Achante Aanmakkal	Meena	Malayalam	
2013	Police Maman	Lekshmy	Malayalam	
2015	Wonderful Journey	Devika	Malayalam	
2016	Poy Maranju Parayathe	Sudha	Malayalam	
