= Poomani (film) =

- Title card
- Directed by: Kalanjiyam
- Written by: Kalanjiyam
- Produced by: G. V. Aanandan
- Starring: Murali; Devayani; Prakash Raj; Reshma
- Cinematography: R. M. Ramnath Shetty
- Edited by: Peter Bhabiah
- Music by: Ilaiyaraaja
- Production company: Aanand Movie Land
- Release date: 6 December 1996
- Running time: 139 minutes
- Country: India
- Language: Tamil

Poomani is a 1996 Indian Tamil-language film, written and directed by Kalanjiyam in his debut. The film stars Murali, Devayani, Prakash Raj and Reshma. It was released on 6 December 1996. Kalanjiyam won the Tamil Nadu State Film Award for Best Story Writer and Jaguar Thangam won for Best Stunt Master.

== Plot ==
When Thangamani flees on his wedding day, his brother, Poomani, steps in and marries Vijaya who detests Poomani. However, as time passes by, she changes her thinking towards him.

== Cast ==
- Murali as Poomani
- Devayani as Vijaya
- Prakash Raj as Thangamani
- Reshma as Pottu
- Manivannan as Veerappan
- Vinu Chakravarthy as Muthuramalingam
- Sabitha Anand

== Soundtrack ==
The music was composed by Ilaiyaraaja.

Song	Singers	Lyrics	Length
"Saami Kodutha"	S. P. Balasubrahmanyam	Vaali	02:52
"En Paattu En Paattu"	Ilaiyaraaja	Mu. Metha	04:44
"Edhuthu Viduda Maappillai"	S. P. Balasubrahmanyam, Manivannan	Vaali	04:33
"Then Podhigai Kaatre"	K. S. Chithra	Kamakodiyan	03:32
"Ila Vatta Vatta Kalla"	Mano, K. S. Chithra	Vaali	05:03
"Thol Mezha Thol"	Ilaiyaraaja, Sujatha Mohan	Palani Bharathi	05:15
"Saami Kodutha Varam"	S. P. Balasubrahmanyam	Vaali	04:42
