= Kodi Parakkuthu =

1988 film directed by Bharathiraja

- Theatrical release poster
- Directed by: Bharathiraja
- Screenplay by: Bharathiraja
- Story by: R. Selvaraj
- Produced by: Bharathiraja
- Starring: Rajinikanth; Amala; Bhagyalakshmi
- Cinematography: B. Kannan
- Edited by: P. Mohanraj
- Music by: Hamsalekha
- Production company: Manoj Creations
- Release date: 8 November 1988
- Running time: 144 minutes
- Country: India
- Language: Tamil

Kodi Parakkuthu (transl. The flag is fluttering) is a 1988 Indian Tamil-language action film co-written, produced and directed by Bharathiraja. The film starred Rajinikanth, who worked with Bharathiraja nearly a decade after their last film 16 Vayathinile (1977). It was released on 8 November 1988, and failed at the box office.

== Plot ==
A mafia leader tries to kill a policeman, Sivagiri, who took down his illegal businesses, with the help of a lookalike. Later, Sivagiri discovers that the leader is responsible for his father's death.

== Cast ==
- Rajinikanth as DCP Erode Sivagiri/JDP Dhadha
- Amala as Aparna
- Bhagyalakshmi as Dhadha's love interest
- Manivannan as GD (voice dubbed by Bharathiraja)
- Sujatha as Sengamalam
- A. R. Srinivasan as Sivagiri's uncle
- Janagaraj as Chinna Dhadha
- Vijayan as Sivagiri's father (Guest appearance)
- Sangili Murugan as Dhadha (Guest appearance)
- S. R. Veeraghavan as I.G.
- Ilavarasu as Police constable
- Sudha as Madhavi
- Vinod Raj as Jailer Meyyappan

== Production ==
Following the financial failure of some of his "award winning" films, Bharathiraja said he was forced to make the more populist Kodi Parakkuthu to compensate his losses. Manivannan portrayed the film's antagonist, and his voice was dubbed by Bharathiraja.

== Soundtrack ==
The music was composed by Hamsalekha. The song "Selai Kattum" is set in the Carnatic raga Shree. The song "Oh Kadhal Ennai" was reused from the song "O Meghave" with a tune in between taken from another song "Mussanjeli Nammuralli" - both from Hamsalekha's earlier Kannada film Ranaranga, which was released the same year.

Title	Singer(s)	Lyrics	Length
"Annai Madiyil" (Female)	Uma Ramanan	Vairamuthu	2:50
"Annai Madiyil" (Male)	S. P. Balasubrahmanyam	Vairamuthu	3:47
"Oh Kadhal Ennai"	S. P. Balasubrahmanyam, Vani Jairam	Vairamuthu	5:05
"Oh Kadhal Ennai"	S. P. Balasubrahmanyam, K. S. Chithra	Vairamuthu	4:12
"Selai Kattum Pennukkoru"	S. P. Balasubrahmanyam, K. S. Chithra	Vairamuthu	4:36
"Thondaikkulle"	Malaysia Vasudevan, K. S. Chithra		6:02

== Release and reception ==
Kodi Parakkuthu was released on 8 November 1988. N. Krishnaswamy of The Indian Express wrote, "Kodi Parakkudhu is a flag that flutters in full flow, its not a half-mast performance and there's no question of Bharathiraja having surrendered creativity at the altar of starry caprice". Jayamanmadhan of Kalki reviewed the film more positively, saying that while Bharathiraja fans may feel cheated due to the film not being in his usual style, it was a treat for Rajinikanth fans. The film was commercially unsuccessful.
