= T. V. Varadarajan =

Indian actor and news anchor

S. Varadarajan, better known as T. V. Varadarajan, is an Indian theatre and television actor and news anchor from Tamil Nadu. He had been a news reader for Doordarshan for over 28 years.

== Early life ==
Varadarajan was working with Bank of India at their Zonal Office in Chennai, before he got an offer as a news reader for Indian's national television channel Doordarshan.

== Career ==
Varadarajan worked for over 28 years as a news anchor for Doordarshan emerging as one of its most familiar faces. Eventually, he got chances to act in his first stage play “Yamirukka Bayamyane?”written by Venkat and directed by Y.G. Mahendra. In the 1990s, Varadarajan formed his own drama troupe. One of his plays Elavasa Enaippu won six awards from the Mylapore Academy.

Veteran Tamil film director K. Balachander gave him a chance to act in television serials. Since then, he has acted in leading roles in three of Balachander's television serials namely Premi, Kai Alavu Manasu and Kadhal Pagadai.

His recent play, 'Ithu Namma Naadu' was a resounding success. 'Ithu Namma Naadu' is a political satire that was enacted on 11 September 2013. This play was written by 'Tughlak' Sathya and Varadarajan directed and starred in it.

== Plays ==
Play	Ref.
Sri Thyagaraja	
Kaialavu Manasu	
Ithu Namma Naadu	

== Filmography ==
Films

Year	Film	Role	Notes
1983	Antha Sila Naatkal		
1994	Pattukottai Periyappa		
1997	Arunachalam		
2000	Kandukondain Kandukondain	Srikanth's interviewer	

Television

Year	Program	Role	Channel	Notes
1996–1998	Kadhal Pagadai	Mohan Babu	Sun TV	
1999	Kasalavu Nesam	Cameo appearance as news reader in first episode and advocate in climax scenes		
1996–1997	Kaialavu Manasu		Sun TV	
2002–2003	Sahana		Jaya TV	
2002–2005	Annamalai	Doctor Sivam	Sun TV	
2003–2005	Anni	Doctor	Jaya TV	
2006	Penn		Sun TV	
2014–2017	Thamarai	Raghavan	Sun TV	

== Awards and nominations ==
- 2012: Nataka Kalasarathy
- 2018: Kalaimamani Award
