= Manivannan =

Indian actor and film director (1953–2013)

- Manivannan in 2012
- Born: Manivannan; 31 July 1954; Sulur, Madras State (now Tamil Nadu), India
- Died: 15 June 2013 (aged 58); Chennai, Tamil Nadu, India
- Occupations: Actor, Film director, Screenwriter, Voice artist, Playback singer and Social Activist
- Years active: 1978–2013
- Works: Full list
- Political party: Naam Tamilar Katchi
- Spouse: Sengamalam
- Children: 2, including Raghuvannan
- Awards: Kalaimamani Award (1998)

Manivannan (31 July 1954 – 15 June 2013) was an Indian actor, film director, screenwriter, voice artist, playback singer and social activist who worked in Tamil cinema. In a career spanning three decades, he went from being a story and dialogue writer for director Bharathiraja from 1980–82 to a successful director who thrived in experimenting with different genres, before becoming an actor. With over 400 films to his name, Manivannan was one of the most experienced actors in the field and directed exactly 50 films. Manivannan was mainly a supporting actor in films and often played the comedian, supporting character and villainous roles.

He supported various political parties, including the Dravida Munnetra Kazhagam and the Marumalarchi Dravida Munnetra Kazhagam, both active in the state of Tamil Nadu. He later became affiliated with the Naam Tamilar Katchi. He had also long been a supporter of Sri Lankan Tamil nationalism.

== Personal life ==
Manivannan hailed from a small town called Sulur in Coimbatore District. He was born on 31 July 1954 to R S Maniam, a rice merchant, textile trader, and a well-known politician in Coimbatore and Maragatham who has contested in the elections and won a seat in the panchayat. Manivannan married Sengamalam, has a daughter and a son Raghu, who is acting in the films and is popularly known as Raghuvannan.

== Career ==
Manivannan attended the Sulur Government Boy's High School and later enrolled at Government Arts College. While completing his pre-university course in Kovai, he became acquainted with Sathyaraj and became friends. According to Sathyaraj, he provided poor guidance to Manivannan and made him pursue a degree in history in advanced English, which made him struggle with topics such as Shakespeare, forcing him to drop out later. While still at college, Manivannan was bitten by the stage-bug and consequently he staged a few performances. Inspired by the impact the film Kizhake Pogum Rail (1978) made on him, he wrote a fan mail to the film-maker Bharathiraja and the letter ran to more than a hundred pages. Bharathiraja took him under his fold as an apprentice. Manivannan joined Bharathiraja's camp around 1979, when the director was acting in and was directing by P S Nivas, Kallukkul Eeram.

He penned the story and dialogues for some of his mentor's films between 1980 and 1982 like Nizhalgal, Tick Tick Tick, Alaigal Oivathillai and Kaadhal Oviyam. Manivannan assisted Bharathiraja in a handful of films like Red Rose (Hindi) starring Rajesh Khanna, Kotha Jeevithalu (Telugu), and Lovers (Hindi). He learned trade hard and fast within two years under Bharathiraja.

As a director, he made films in different genres – from romance to thriller to drama. He made his directorial début with Gopurangal Saivathillai in 1982. He had also penned the story and dialogues for a bunch of other films like Lottery Ticket acted by Mohan and Prabhu, Agaya Gangai acted by Karthik, Nesam acted by Ajith Kumar. In Rajinikanth's Kodi Parakuthu, directed by Bharathiraja, Manivannan did the villain's role.

He was most known for his acting skills among public. He was considered unique in the industry for his wisdom and his character roles. He had acted alongside many stars including Sivaji Ganeshan, Kamal Haasan, Rajinikanth, Sathyaraj, Vijayakanth, Mohan, Karthik, Sarathkumar, Murali, Vijay, Ajith Kumar, Madhavan and among others.

Manivannan directed 50 films including a few ventures in Telugu and Hindi. The Hindu wrote that his film Amaidhi Padai (1994) "has set the standards for political satire in Tamil cinema".

His protégés include directors Vikraman, R K Selvamani, Sundar C, Seeman, K Selva Bharathy, Radha Bharathi, C V Sasikumar, E. Ramdoss, Jeeva Balan and Rasu Madhuravan.

In the late 1990s and early 2000s, Manivannan prioritised his acting career. At the height of his acting career, six of his film released on the same day in January 1998. Certain directorial ventures which he had started including Aaruvathu Sinam featuring Sathyaraj and Prabhu, were delayed and then dropped. He directed his 50th and last film Nagaraja Cholan MA, MLA (2013), a sequel to Amaidhi Padai. Manivannan directed his best friend Sathyaraj in 25 films.

== Politics ==
Manivannan was first a staunch supporter of the Dravida Munnetra Kazhagam (DMK) as his father R S Maniam was the DMK town secretary of Sulur, which made Manivannan develop an interest in the ideology of the Dravidian movement. However, later he became a Marxist and an activist in the naxalite movement. He had political differences even with his father.

Manivannan was a Tamil patriot and joined the Marumalarchi Dravida Munnetra Kazhagam (MDMK) political party and campaigned for them during the 2006 Assembly elections. He later joined Naam Tamilar Katchi and has been as supporter of Tamil Eelam.

== Death ==
Manivannan died shortly after the release of his 50th directorial venture Nagaraja Cholan MA, MLA due to a cardiac arrest on 15 June 2013 at the age of 59 in his Nesapakkam residence at Chennai. His body was wrapped in the flag of Tamil Eelam as he wished. Two months after his death, his wife died on 15 August 2013.

== Awards ==
- Kalaimamani Award - 1998
