= Uruvam =

- Title card
- Directed by: G. M. Kumar
- Written by: G. M. Kumar; R. P. Viswam (dialogues)
- Produced by: D. P. Singh; Tarun Jalan
- Starring: Mohan; Pallavi; R. P. Viswam; Veera Pandiyan; Jayamala
- Cinematography: Velu Prabhakaran
- Edited by: A. P. Manivannan
- Music by: Ilaiyaraaja
- Production company: Prathik Pictures
- Release date: 3 January 1991
- Running time: 105 minutes
- Country: India
- Language: Tamil

Uruvam (transl. Figure) is a 1991 Indian Tamil-language Supernatural horror film, directed by G. M. Kumar. The film stars Mohan, Pallavi, R. P. Viswam, débutante Veera Pandiyan and Jayamala.

== Plot ==
The illegitimate son of a rich man loses a court battle over the palatial house in which he has been living. So he appeals to Bangaru Muni and he sets off a devastating abhichara prayoga (black magic attack) on the legitimate son Mohan and his family. Bangaru Muni unleashes a evil spirit in the house. He does the ashtadig bandhan so that person should not escape.Meanwhile,in a Devi Temple,Jolna Sami and his disciple perform pooja,but they notice the blood coming from Devi's eyes indicating a bad thing is going to come in a family's life and starts reciting verses from Kantha Sashti Kavasam which makes the blood reverse its way.After this,they go to caution the family soon which is going to be affected by this bad thing.

Mohan lives happily with his wife, his two children, his sister Raasi, his brother-in-law Ashok and his wife's sister Meena. They all move to the palatial house.The first 2 to 3 days go well and then the negative things starts taking place in that house.The lamp(KuthuVilakku) near the Vinayaka Statue switches off automatically and Mohan's mother photo gets broken into pieces. One day,A fortune teller comes for getting rice as alms and seeing Mohan's face beknowing the future he dropped the rice plate and runs away in a hurry-burried manner.At night,Raasi experiences bad experiences like things falling in her room and breaking,smoke coming inside the room.Mohan's wife also experiences same things.Mohan's 2 children while playing ball,became scared to see the ball returning to them in blood red colour after bouncing back.Raasi's boyfriend's sister Meena gets tortured by an unknown force while taking bath in restroom and she informs that she has been little raped.So Mohan's wife consults him and asks him to come to Jolna Sami to find a remedy for these problems.But Mohan is an atheist who doesn't believe in the supernatural or God.So he refuses to come with them.Others travel to see the saint but a corpse lies in midst of the road and stops them.And then a hand tries to touch Raasi and she gets scared and comes to Jolna Sami and explains their situation. While in the house,a spirit unleashed by Bangaru Mani follows Mohan and he tries to kills it with his gun but the gun is beseized by the spirit from his hands and unable to escape,at last, Mohan is possessed by that spirit .Soon he turns into a vampire-like figure. At night,the possessed Mohan enters into Meena's room ,unleashes his attack ,rapes her and turns her into like him.Jolna Sami tries to intervene by destroying the evil spirit,but he can't as the water in his pot turns red and a violent-changed Meena attacks him while trying to enter into her room.At early morning,Meena comes in the hall,which makes others scared at her look. Soon Bangaru Mani applies the black magic,Meena's head starts rotating like a top with her jiva-shakthi(life power) being sucked off unknowingly and she falls to the ground and dies.After hearing this,Raasi's boyfriend Ashok gets shocked and refuses Raasi's Marriage proposal and goes.Jolna Sami performs a penance to find the spirit inside Mohan's body. While,in the home Mohan gets his new horoscope written by Bangaru Muni through his disciple,asking him to go out of that palatial house.He also asks him to check whether he is evil or not by checking his hand before the God's statue.Mohan does this and seeing hand change into a ghastly figure,he gets scared and runs out of the house and prays to Almighty for not saving him.At last,he tells his family and they plan for an outing and they stay in a resort and enjoy after some negative things happen(Mohan misses his car key and somehow he manages to find it after difficulties like a teddy toy opening its eye etc.)But in sometime,Jolna Sami finds the person and the spirit's intention and he takes the voodoo doll from hs house by using his yogic power.Soon he sets off to free Mohan from that evil spirit.But that spirit knowing this, possesses Mohan once again when he was sunbathing in the resort swimming pool .It goes to a beach where Bangaru Muni was walking and starts warning him.But Bangaru Muni ignores it and finally that evil spirit kills Bangaru muni by plucking the petals of life -handling flower of Bangaru Muni.A dying Bangaru Muni tells the secret to Jolna Samy and dies. Jolna Sami rushes to the spot, and meanwhile Mohan again starts turning into that terrible vampiric figure and first kills his sisters' boyfriend Ashok by slapping him while he was giving the house key to Mohan,and then his wife,then children by shooting them using his gun.The next day morning,Cops arrive with Raasi,Jolna Sami and arrests a grieved Mohan.Jolna Sami tries to appeal to a lawyer to free Mohan stating that he was possessed.But the lawyer refused to accept this.But at the same night,it disappears from the jail and goes to kill Raasi. At last,it finds Raasi after being searched by her and he starts chasing her and scares with his terrible face.At last,Raasi is confronted by a possessed Mohan and when he was trying to kill her with his gun in the staircase,Jolna Swamy comes to the spot and shows the doll and makes the spirit disappear.But when he goes in the room,the spirit appears again brutally attacks him and thrashes his neck to kill him but his disciple starts uttering the verses from the Sashti Kavasam and saves his Guru.And then both start fighting against the evil spirit which is in Mohan's body by using neem leaves,sacred Ash,Vermillion,applying needles to Voodoo doll and by covering Mohan's body with sacred cloth so that it cannot make an attempt to attack.Jolna Swamy finally destroys the spirit invoking Lord Subramanya's power with Mohan getting freed from the evil spirit, but Mohan is sent to a mental asylum, where he grieves for not believing in Almighty God.

== Cast ==
- Mohan as Mohan
- Pallavi as Raasi
- R. P. Viswam as Jolna Swamy
- Veera Pandiyan as Ashok
- Jayamala as Mohan's wife
- Sathyajith as Bangaru Muni
- Moorthy
- Roshini as Meena
- Master Krishnaprasad as Mohan's son
- Baby Swarnalatha as Mohan's daughter
- Crazy Venkatesh as Venkatesh
- Vaithyanathan
- R. T. Madurai Mani
- Sottai Mani
- Pandian

== Production ==
=== Development ===
After the failure of his films Pick Pocket and Irumbu Pookkal, G. M. Kumar began work on his next film, also his first horror film. The film was produced by actress Pallavi's brother and another partner.

=== Casting ===
Mohan accepted the offer of the protagonist and hoped for a fresh lease on his career. Pallavi signed on for this new project with G. M. Kumar, who acted in two of his previous films. R. P. Viswam would have a vital role of a Swamy and was also responsible for the dialogue. The newcomer Arasavarathan would essay the role as Pallavi's husband, while Jayamala would play Mohan's wife. Three different cinematographers: K. Rajpreeth, Ilavarasan and Dhayal handle the camera, K. A. Balan was signed up as the art director, while A. P. Manivannan took up the post of the editor.

=== Filming ===
The film was made on low budget, G. M. Kumar shot the film with three different units, each unit consisting of an assistant director and a cinematographer: S. Govindaraj with K. Rajpreeth, S. Selvakumar with Ilavarasan and D. Narayanamoorthy with Dhayal. G. M. Kumar managed to complete the film within 12 days. The film did not include any fight sequences. Ilaiyaraaja provided mainly the background music and composed only one song. The film was heavily censored by the censor board, which gave the film an "A" certificate, an adult rating, due to its "mix of soft porn and hard horror".

== Reception ==
N. Krishnaswamy of The Indian Express wrote, "The proceedings are sometimes terrifying, even repulsive, and are surely not meant for the soft hearted. Kumar resorts to a mix of soft porn and hard horror". Sundarji of Kalki wrote even though it is inspired from American films like The Exorcist, it is not the kind of building up fear slowly, its kind of horror standing behind the door and suddenly appearing. Therefore the initial fear in the beginning gradually becomes normal and becomes like that is it.
