= Thaye Neeye Thunai =

- Title card
- Directed by: P. R. Somasundar
- Written by: P. R. Somasundar
- Produced by: Ramakrishnan; P. R. Somasundar; T. S. Raghavendra
- Starring: K. R. Vijaya; Srividya; Karthik
- Cinematography: S. Maruti Rao
- Edited by: K. Ramalingam
- Music by: Raveendran
- Production company: Bhuvaneshwari Kalamandhir
- Release date: 14 January 1987
- Country: India
- Language: Tamil

Thaye Neeye Thunai (transl. Mother, you are protection) is a 1987 Indian Tamil-language devotional film written, co-produced and directed by P. R. Somasundar. The film stars K. R. Vijaya, Srividya and Karthik. It was released on 14 January 1987, during Pongal.

== Plot ==
Pandian, a circus ringmaster, shoulders the financial responsibilities of his family, comprising his retired school teacher father, homemaker mother Rajeshwari, and unmarried sister, Seetha, whose prospective grooms' families demand exorbitant dowries. Pandian, driven by financial necessity, accepts the high-risk task of performing with the lion, worrying his family.

Meanwhile, in the sacred precincts of Karunaiyur Kamakshi Amman temple, traditional healer Kamakshi Paatti raises orphaned Sivagami as her granddaughter. Upon discovering her true identity, Sivagami confronts Paatti. Paatti reveals Sivagami's lineage: her father, Devanatha Gurukkal, the temple priest, had left his toddler daughter at the temple. Defying temple protocol, he reopened the sanctum sanctorum door at night, seeking his child. Goddess Adiparasakthi manifested before Sivagami's parents, emphasizing the importance of adhering to rituals. Overwhelmed, they succumbed to divine awe. In a profound revelation, Sivagami's grandmother is none other than Goddess Kamakshi Amman herself.

Karthik, a successful businessman, who is searching for a bride rejects a girl with an extra finger and a wealthy girl with strabismus after a confrontation with her brother. At a cassette shop, Karthik meets Seetha and falls in love. Karthik's secretary arranges their marriage without dowry, generously providing all the necessary jewelry. However, their happiness is short-lived, as Seetha loses her vision due to night blindness. The strabismus-eyed girl, still bitter from Karthik's rejection, informs him of Seetha's condition. Seetha and her mother, Rajeshwari, pray at the temple for Seetha's cure. Karthik confronts Seetha, questioning her condition, and takes her to a dark area to test her. Miraculously cured by divine grace, Seetha accurately identifies her surroundings, dispelling Karthik's doubts. Acknowledging Seetha's past condition, Karthik vows to care for his wife.

Meanwhile, Uma's brother Kathiresan returns from Dubai after losing his right hand in an accident. Kathiresan asks his brother Manikam for financial support, but Manikam claims poverty. Unbeknownst to Kathiresan, Manikam has converted Kathiresan's money into gold coins hidden in his walking stick. Manikam's associates advise him to fake a promise at Kamakshiamman temple to feign innocence. However, Kathiresan and his pregnant wife Kannamma leave before Manikam returns. Kamakshi Paatti, wise to Manikam's malicious intentions to exploit poor farmers, confronts him. So, Manikam plots to humiliate her by staging his aide's death but is foiled when the aide unexpectedly dies. Further, Manikam frames her for theft, by making his men loot the temple jewels, but Kamakshi Paatti, the Goddess, confronts and defeats the thieves. Manikam attempts to shame Kamakshi Paatti at the village panchayat, ordering her whipping. However, she endures with a smile, while the villagers bear the pain. Kannamma's complicated childbirth is saved by Kamakshi Paatti's timely intervention, while Sivagami rescues Kannamma, who is struggling with menial jobs, and provides temple food allocated to them.

Uma's daughter contracts smallpox, prompting Rajeshwari to suggest faith healing but Uma refuses, citing her mother's tragic death from smallpox due to her father's reliance on faith healing. During a circus performance, a ferocious tiger charges at Pandian, but a photo of Goddess Adiparasakthi miraculously saves his life. Now with a change of mind, Pandian along with his mother Rajeshwari, take the ailing child to various temples and spiritual centers, like Irukkankudi Mariamman Temple, Thengal Mouna Guru Swamigal Ashramam, Koniamman Temple, Perur Pateeswarar Temple, Bannari Mariamman Temple, Pariyur Kondathu Kaliamman Temple and Salem Kottai Periya Mariamman Temples despite Uma's reservations.

On Naga Sathurthi, the indian cobra, believed to be an incarnation of Goddess Adiparashakthi, visits Kannamma's house, blessing her child. The family then offers koozh, a holy porridge to Kamakshi Paatti. Meanwhile, Manikam, after a scuffle, beats people and wastes the koozh, leaving them starving. Kamakshi Paatti confronts him, warning him of imminent punishment. Eventually, Manikam suffers seizures and becomes bedridden, making him realize that his karma is the cause, and he prostrates before Kamakshi Paatti, seeking a cure. She demands Manikam's land in exchange, demarcating boundaries by her goat's run. Overnight, Sivagami discovers her grandmother's true identity as Goddess Adiparasakthi. Manikam recovers, and Kamakshi Paatti claims the land as promised. Manikam's associates plot revenge, attempting to molest Sivagami but Pandian rescues her. En route to Kamakshi Paatti, Manikam's associates fatally stab Rajeshwari.

Kamakshi Paatti insists Uma visit to cure her daughter, so now a reformed Uma requests Kamakshi Paatti's help. Goddess Adiparasakthi reveals her true form, curing Pandian's daughter and explaining Uma's mother's death as fate. The Goddess bids farewell to Sivagami and Uma promises to arrange Sivagami's marriage.

== Cast ==
- K. R. Vijaya in a dual role as
  - Goddess Adhiparashakthi
  - Kamakshi Paatti
- Srividya as Rajeshwari, Pandian and Seetha's mother
- Karthik as Karthik
- Nalini as Uma, Pandian's wife
- Sudha Chandran as Sivagami
- Sumitra as Kannamma, Kathiresan's wife
- Pallavi as Seetha, Karthik's wife
- V. Gopalakrishnan as Pandian and Seetha's father
- S. S. Chandran as Karthik's secretary
- Delhi Ganesh as Devanatha Gurukkal, Sivagami's father
- V.P. Ramakrishnan as Manikam, a landlord
- T. S. Raghavendra as Kathiresan, Uma's brother
- Sabitha Anand as a strabismus eyed girl
- Pandiyan in a special appearance as Pandian, a ringmaster
- MLA Thangaraj as Rani's father
- Vellai Subbaiah as a temple priest
- Sivaraman as a temple priest
- Thideer Kannaiah as a villager
- Pakoda Kadhar as a devotee who offers goat
- Baby Kalpana
- R. Sarathkumar as strabismus eyed girl's brother (uncredited)

== Production ==
The film was launched at AVM Studios along with song recording. The scene where Karthik meets Sabitha Anand was shot at Taj Coromandel hotel.

== Soundtrack ==
Soundtrack was composed by Raveendran.

| Song | Singer(s) | Lyrics |
|---|---|---|
| Sri Bhuvaneswari | K. J. Yesudas, K. S. Chithra | Vaali |
| Vaama Devi | P. Susheela | Thirupathooran |
| Kukku Kuyile | S. P. Balasubrahmanyam, Vani Jairam | Chidambaranathan |
| Chellakiliye | Chithra | Ponnaruvi |
| Aayiram Kangal | Vani Jairam, Chithra | Muthulingam |
