= G. M. Kumar =

Indian film actor

- Born: Govindraj Manoharan Kumar; 26 July 1957 (age 69); Madras, Madras State (now Chennai, Tamil Nadu), India
- Occupations: Actor, Film director, producer, writer
- Years active: 1986–present

G. M. Kumar is an Indian actor and former director who has worked in Tamil language films. He won the Nandi Award for Second Best Story Writer for the film Muvva Gopaludu (1987), which is an official remake of his own film Aruvadai Naal.

== Personal life ==
G. M. Kumar was born in 1957 in Avadi. As a child he got the chance to view many films. He worked in the film industry as an assistant director to K. Bhagyaraj. He worked with Livingston and R.P.Vishwam for movies like Kakki Sattai and Kanni Rasi.

== Career ==
Kumar debuted in films by directing Sivaji Productions' Aruvadai Naal (1986) with Prabhu in the lead role. The film won good reviews and fetched Kumar several offers to make more films. His next two directorial ventures, Pickpocket and Uruvam, were disasters. The film Irumbu Pookal's music did well as two songs were composed by M.S.Viswanathan, however the film failed at the box office. Thus his market value significantly diminished and he only went to make three more films despite his initial success. His decision to produce and direct Uruvam became a financial failure and put him into bankruptcy. He ended up making his acting debut as a villain in Bharathiraja's Captain Magal (1992), before disappearing to make documentaries and to study anthropology. In the early 2000s, he was once again on the verge of bankruptcy and chose to act in minor roles offered by his protege Raj Kapoor, in films including Ramchandra and the unreleased Sivalingam IPS. He expressed his surprise at being given an offer by Shankar's production house and took up the role in Veyil (2006) to make ends meet, winning acclaim for his role.

Bala approached him to star in Avan Ivan as a character called Highness, with his performance winning him a nomination for the Vijay Award for Best Supporting Actor. Critics labelled his performance as "riveting", though the film only received average reviews.

== Filmography ==
=== Acting credits ===
Year	Film	Role	Notes
1993	Captain Magal	Kumar "GM"	
2002	Kadhal Virus	Himself	
2003	Ramachandra	Kumar	
2005	Thotti Jaya		
2006	Veyil	Mayandi Thevar	
2007	Machakaaran	Rajangam	
2007	Malaikottai	Kumar Annan	
2008	Aayudham Seivom	Annaachi	
2008	Kuruvi	Bhai	
2009	Mayandi Kudumbathar	Virumandi	
2009	Thee	J.P.	
2010	Maathi Yosi		
2010	Milaga	Azhagar's father	
2011	Avargalum Ivargalum	Chinnasamy	
2011	Avan Ivan	Zamindar Thirthapathi (Highness)	Nominated, Vijay Award for Best Supporting Actor
2011	Vellore Maavattam	Muthukumar's father	
2011	Sankarankovil		
2013	Chandhamama	J. Kanthan	
2014	Thenaliraman	Chief Minister	
2014	Appuchi Gramam	Nallamuthu	
2015	Sandamarutham	Surya's grandfather	
2015	Thoppi	Suruttu Saamy	
2015	Agathinai	Ayanaru's father	
2016	Tharai Thappattai	Samipulavan	
2016	Ennama Katha Vudranunga		
2017	Saravanan Irukka Bayamaen	Veerasingam's father-in-law	
2017	Thirappu Vizha		
2017	Enbathettu		
2017	Velaiilla Pattadhari 2	Chettiyar	
2017	Kida Virundhu		
2018	Jarugandi	Warden Rajaram	
2018	Chalo	Zamindar	Telugu film
2019	Naan Avalai Sandhitha Pothu	Kumari's father	
2021	Chidambaram Railwaygate		
2021	Karnan	Dhuriyodhanan	
2022	Radha Krishna	Tribal Group leader	
2022	Pattathu Arasan		
2023	Nanpakal Nerathu Mayakkam	Village Head	Malayalam film
2023	Bommai Nayagi	Velu's father	
2023	Pallu Padama Paathukka	A blind rich man	
2023	Burqa	Vaapa	
2024	Nandhan	Periyayya	
2025	Kumaara Sambavam	Kumaran's grandfather	
2025	Mark	Bhadra	Kannada film
2026	Demonte Colony 3	TBA	Post-production

=== Directing and writing credits ===
Year	Film	Director	Writer	Notes
1985	Kanni Rasi	No	Screenplay	
1985	Kakki Sattai	No	Story	
1986	Aruvadai Naal	Yes	Screenplay	
1989	Pickpocket	Yes	Yes	
1990	My Dear Marthandan	No	Story	
1991	Irumbu Pookkal	Yes	Yes	
1991	Uruvam	Yes	Yes	

== Television ==
Year	Title	Role(s)	Notes	Ref.
2017	Devathayai Kanden	Vasudevan's grandfather		
2020	Poove Unakkaga	Shankaralingam		
2021	Sembaruthi	Aadhikadavur" Aadhi Parameswaran		
2021	November Story	Ganeshan		
2022–present	Peranbu			
2022	Paper Rocket	Grandfather		
