= Vilaasam =

2014 Indian film by Pa. Rajaganesan

- Directed by: Pa. Rajaganesan
- Written by: Pa. Rajaganesan
- Produced by: Pavithran Prashanth
- Starring: Pawan; Sanam Shetty
- Cinematography: U. K. Senthil Kumar; V. A. Ramalingam
- Edited by: Rangees Chandrasekhar
- Music by: Ravi Raaghav
- Production company: Sree Sanaa Films
- Release date: 14 November 2014
- Country: India
- Language: Tamil

Vilaasam (transl. Address) is a 2014 Indian Tamil-language action drama film written and directed by Pa. Rajaganesan. The film stars Pawan and Sanam Shetty in the lead roles. It was released on 14 November 2014, and was later dubbed and released in Telugu under the same name.

== Cast ==
- Pawan as Shiva (Seesa)
- Sanam Shetty as Abhi
- Aadukalam Naren as Pandian
- Aruldoss as Bawa
- Rajendran
- Raj Kapoor
- Bava Lakshmanan
- Cheran Raj
- Sujibala
- Shamili
- Sharmila
- Bose Venkat
- Chetan as Dr. Naghendirababu
- King Kong
- Kottachi

== Production ==
The film was directed by debutant Raja Ganesan, with Pawan and Sanam Shetty picked to play the lead roles.

== Soundtrack ==
The soundtrack was composed by Ravi Raaghav.

| No. | Title | Singer(s) | Length |
|---|---|---|---|
| 1. | "Yarivo Yevaravro" | Ranjith |
| 2. | "Silukku Sundariye" | Tippu, Priyadharshini, Reshmi |
| 3. | "Kasu Thanthavana" | Gana Bala, Jayamoorthy |
| 4. | "Salai Ooram Nindru" | Chinmayi, Haricharan |
| 5. | "Nanba Nanba" | Deepak |

== Release and reception ==
The film was released on 14 November 2014, alongside six other films in Tamil Nadu. The New Indian Express noted that the film was an "appreciable effort by a debutant maker", concluding that it was a "gripping tale about identity".

A critic from Maalai Malar gave the film a positive review, praising the performance of the lead actors. Likewise, critics from Dinamalar and IFlicks.com also gave the film positive reviews.
