= Ilamai Oonjal =

2016 Indian film by Mangai Harirajan

- Poster
- Directed by: Mangai Harirajan
- Written by: Mangai Harirajan
- Produced by: S. R. Manoharan
- Starring: Namitha; Kiran Rathod; Meghna Naidu; Keerthi Chawla
- Cinematography: J. G. Krishna
- Edited by: Uma Shankar Babu
- Music by: Karthik Bhoopathy Raja
- Production company: Shree Preyam Creations
- Release date: 2 September 2016
- Country: India
- Language: Tamil

Ilamai Oonjal (transl. Swing of youth) is a 2016 Indian Tamil-language action film written and directed by Mangai Harirajan. The film features Namitha in the lead role, while Kiran Rathod, Meghna Naidu, Keerthi Chawla, Arthi, Shivani Singh, Shravanth, and Mangai Harirajan played supporting roles. Featuring music composed by Karthik Bhoopathy Raja. The film was released on 3 September 2016 after a three-year delay.

== Plot ==
Some college students from Chennai go on vacation trip to a hill station. On their trip, five girls get killed one by one by a terrorist. The rest of the story is why they got killed, who is the killer, and how DIG Durga saves them.

== Cast ==
- Namitha as Durga
- Kiran Rathod as herself
- Meghna Naidu as herself
- Keerthi Chawla as herself
- Arthi as herself
- Shivani Singh as herself
- Shravanth
- Mangai Harirajan
- Pandiarajan
- Vijayakumar as Home Minister
- Anu Mohan as Tamil director
- Pandu as a director
- T. P. Gajendran as an actor
- Satya Prakash
- Thideer Kannaiah
- Bonda Mani as an actor
- Sumithra as Ramu's mother
- Abhinayashree as the nurse
- Ravindranath as the police inspector
- Tennis Krishna as Paramasivam (uncredited)
- Uttej as Harikrishnan (uncredited)

Telugu

- Babu Mohan as an actor
- Gundu Hanumantha Rao as the doctor
- Sudha as the nurse
- Siva Parvathi

Kannada

- Ashok Rao as Home Minister

== Production and release ==
The film began production as a Tamil-Telugu-Kannada trilingual film; however, the film was only partially reshot in Telugu and Kannada. The Telugu and Kannada versions were titled as Bhaja Bhajanthreelu and Sikkapatte Ishtapatte, respectively. Namitha was cast a police officer. The film was shot in Hogenakkal, Hyderabad and Munnar. Only the Tamil and Kannada versions were released.

== Soundtrack ==
The music was composed by Karthik Bhoopathy Raja with lyrics by Piraisoodan.

- "Karuvadu Karuvadu" - Krishnaraj
- "O Nayagi" - Ramu
- "Mamadha Leelai" - Murali, Sabitha, Hema Ambika
- "Mazhai Varuthaa" - Malgudi Subha
- "Eravinil Oru Aatam" - Chaitra H. G.
