= Sirayil Sila Raagangal =

1990 film

- Title card
- Directed by: Rajendrakumar
- Written by: N. Prasannakumar (dialogues)
- Screenplay by: Rajendrakumar
- Story by: Rajendrakumar
- Produced by: S. Aarumugalakshmi; C. Kalaivani
- Starring: Murali; Pallavi; Prathap Pothan; Sarath Kumar
- Cinematography: M. S. Annadurai
- Edited by: R. Bhaskaran
- Music by: Ilaiyaraaja
- Production company: Sri Lakshmi Vaani Pictures
- Release date: 17 October 1990
- Country: India
- Language: Tamil

Sirayil Sila Raagangal (transl. A few melodies in prison) is a 1990 Indian Tamil-language film directed by Rajendrakumar, starring Murali, Pallavi and Prathap Pothan. It was released on 17 October 1990, during Diwali.

== Cast ==
- Murali
- Pallavi
- Prathap Pothan
- Sarath Kumar
- Vijayakumar
- Kumarimuthu
- Idichapuli Selvaraj
- Thyagu
- Thakkali Srinivasan
- Bava Lakshmanan

== Soundtrack ==
The soundtrack was composed by Ilaiyaraaja.

Song	Singer(s)	Lyrics	Duration
"Aasaiyirukku"	Malaysia Vasudevan	Vaali	04:40
"Eyzhu Swaram"	Ilaiyaraaja	Vaali	04:32
"Kaathalukku Paatatharukku"	Mano, S. Janaki	Vaali	04:45
"Kai Pidithu"	K. J. Yesudas, K. S. Chithra	Vaali	04:25
"Kalludaikka"	Ilaiyaraaja	Gangai Amaran	04:30
"Thendral Varum"	K. S. Chithra, K. J. Yesudas	Mu. Metha	04:24
