= Jothi (1983 film) =

- Title card
- Directed by: Manivannan
- Written by: Manivannan
- Produced by: V. E. Thiagarajan; R. M. Chokkalingam
- Starring: Mohan; Ambika
- Cinematography: Haribabu
- Edited by: K. Kesavakumar
- Music by: Ilaiyaraaja
- Production company: Thai Creations
- Release date: 14 January 1983
- Country: India
- Language: Tamil

Jothi (transl. Light) is a 1983 Indian Tamil-language film directed by Manivannan. The film stars Mohan and Ambika. It was released on 14 January 1983.

== Cast ==
- Mohan
- Ambika
- Sathyajith
- Sumathi
- Silk Smitha
- Goundamani
- Vinu Chakravarthy
- Loose Mohan
- Usilai Mani
- Master Haja Sheriff
- K. K. Soundar
- Gemini Rajeshwari
- Sathya

== Production ==
Jothi was the first film that Manivannan began directing, though its delayed release meant that Gopurangal Saivathillai (1982) became his directorial debut.

== Soundtrack ==
The music was composed by Ilaiyaraaja.

Track listing
No.	Title	Lyrics	Singer(s)	Length
1.	"Satthuru Mookaye"	Avinasi Mani	Malaysia Vasudevan, B. S. Sasirekha, Vidhyadhar and chorus
2.	"Aasai Madhana"	Gangai Amaran	S. P. Sailaja
3.	"Gama Gama"	Vaali	Malaysia Vasudevan, S. P. Sailaja and chorus
4.	"Siricha Kolli Mala Kuyilu"	Vairamuthu	S. P. Balasubrahmanyam, B. R. Chaya

== Reception ==
Thiraignani of Kalki felt Mohan and Ambika were a mismatched pair but praised their performances, felt Sathyajith was unimpressive as villain, and Smitha was wasted, while many characters were just randomly coming and going. Anna felt Manivannan's direction has nothing to boast of and the story was not conveyed properly on the screen and it tested one's patience while felt music was average and Mohan was wasted and his character was unclear but praised the acting of Ambika and other actors. The film was commercially unsuccessful.
