= Irukkangudi =

Village in India

Irukkangudi is a village in the Virudhunagar district in the South Indian State of Tamil Nadu. It is located 545km (338.647 Mile) southwest of state capital Chennai and 89km (55.302Mile) south of Madurai.

== Religion ==
- Mariamman Temple
