= Ramya Raj =

Malaysian actress

- Born: Ramya Rajendran; Kuala Lumpur, Malaysia
- Other name: Ragini
- Occupations: Actress, model
- Years active: 2008–2011

Ramya Raj, alias Ragini, is a former Malaysian actress, who has appeared in Tamil films.

== Career ==
She is probably best known for her performance in Sandai. Ramya is related to actress Khushbu, by her elder sister being Kushboo's sister-in-law. The relationship helped Ramya to debut opposite Sundar C, Kushboo's husband. Her acting was not well received in the film by critics. Regarding her performance in Naanayam, a critic states that "Ramya Raj has more than one role to play, and does justice to it" whilst another stated, "The role which offers immense scope should have been handled better".

== Filmography ==
Year	Film	Role	Language	Notes
2008	Sandai	Abhirami	Tamil	credited as Ragini
2009	Thee	Kalyani	Tamil	
2010	Naanayam	Easwari / Nandhini	Tamil	
2011	Sevenes	Linta	Malayalam	
