= Sudhandhiram =

- DVD cover
- Directed by: Raj Kapoor
- Screenplay by: Raj Kapoor
- Story by: Anjum Rajabali
- Produced by: K. R. Gangadharan
- Starring: Arjun; Rambha; Raghuvaran
- Cinematography: M. V. Panneerselvam
- Edited by: B. Lenin; V. T. Vijayan
- Music by: S. A. Rajkumar
- Production company: KRG Movies
- Release date: 25 February 2000
- Running time: 146 minutes
- Country: India
- Language: Tamil

Suthanthiram (transl. Freedom – transl. Independence ) is a 2000 Indian Tamil-language crime action film directed by Raj Kapoor and produced by K. R. Gangadharan. The film stars Arjun and Rambha while Raghuvaran, Radhika and Sharat Saxena play supporting roles. It is a remake of the Hindi film Ghulam (1998) which itself is based on the 1954 American film On the Waterfront.

== Plot ==
Vishwa is a goonda and an aspiring boxing champion. He does the typical goonda jobs (like scaring a batsman of the local cricket club to make sure he becomes out) for Sopraj, the local dada. He is usually bailed out by a lawyer Padmini, who believes that there is still good in him and he just needs to be given another chance. Sopraj is aiming to build a colony in the area after vacating the people already living there. Vishwa's brother Raghu, is an accountant on Sopraj's payroll. Love blossoms between Vishwa and Divya, the girlfriend of the head of a local gang. When a social worker Vikram intrudes in the affairs of Sopraj, he asks Vishwa to bring Vikram to him. Vishwa does so thinking that Sopraj is just going to talk some sense into him but Sopraj brutally kills him instead. This makes Vishwa turn over a new leaf. Though his love for his brother prevents him initially, he finally decides to turn approver against Sopraj.

== Cast ==
- Arjun as Vishwa
- Rambha as Divya
- Raghuvaran as Raghu
- Sharat Saxena as Sopraj (voice dubbed by Salim Ghouse)
- Radhika as Lawyer Padmini
- Nassar as Sathyamoorthy
- Ranjith as Vikram
- Vivek as Surf Raj
- Neena as Neena
- Babloo Prithiveeraj as Charlie
- Ponnambalam as Guna
- Thalaivasal Vijay as Divya's father
- Vaiyapuri
- Raj Kapoor as Bharathi
- Master Mahendran
- Chaplin Balu

== Soundtrack ==
Soundtrack was composed by S. A. Rajkumar and lyrics were written by Kalaikumar.

Song	Singers	Length
Coco Cola	Shankar Mahadevan, Swarnalatha	04:07
Ennanamo Matram	Sujatha, Hariharan	05:01
Konjam Chillunu	S. P. Balasubrahmanyam, Anuradha Sriram	04:07
Mazhai Mazhai	Hariharan, Sujatha	04:43
Varthai Illamal	Hariharan, K. S. Chithra	05:00

== Release and reception ==
Malathi Rangarajan of The Hindu wrote, "With a rough, rugged and unkempt look, Arjun does make an impression, but not the kind he created with Mudhalvan. It is mainly because there is not enough clarity in the characterisation", and appreciated Vivek's comedy for limited double entendres, "terrific sense of timing and well conceived humour". Krishna Chidambaram of Kalki wrote the biggest downfall after the biggest success is the little devil that haunts Arjun for so long, it has continued even after Mudhalvan. Malini Mannath of Chennai Online wrote "The film is a remake of that successful Hindi film Ghulam. No doubt, it had a well-crafted screenplay and a racy narrative style. But the maker while producing a faithful copy of the screenplay has forgotten that the original's success was also due to other factors". Dinakaran wrote, "If only had the screenplay been designed and scripted infusing into it still more nativity colour and much more spontaneity the film might have become more enjoyable".

The film became a commercial failure and prompted a legal tussle between Arjun and Gangadharan soon after regarding non-payment as per contract. Owing to the success of Mudhalvan in Telugu, the film's dubbing rights were bought in advance of the original release and a Telugu version titled Bose was released alongside the Tamil film.
