= Kalai Vendhan =

2015 Indian film by R. K. Parasuram

- Directed by: R. K. Parasuram
- Written by: R. K. Parasuram
- Produced by: S. Kamalakannan
- Starring: Ajay; Sanam Shetty; Kalabhavan Mani
- Cinematography: S. Karthik
- Edited by: G. Sasikumar
- Music by: Srikanth Deva
- Production company: SK Films International
- Release date: 7 August 2015
- Country: India
- Language: Tamil

Kalai Vendhan is a 2015 Indian Tamil-language action drama film written and directed by R. K. Parasuram. The film stars Ajay and Sanam Shetty in the lead roles. It was released on 7 August 2015.

== Plot ==
Kalai becomes a teacher of the martial art form, vovinam, under training of his guru at a martial arts school. Malar visits the school to meet her friend, and became acquainted with Kalai. Over time, the pair fall in love. Malar's mother is against her daughter's choice of boyfriend. It is later revealed that Malar has been kidnapped, which Kalai sets out to resolve.

== Cast ==
- Ajay as Kalai
- Sanam Shetty as Malar
- Kalabhavan Mani as Panneerselvam
- Manobala
- T. P. Gajendran
- Anu Mohan
- Thalaivasal Vijay
- Nalini as Malar's mother
- Yuvarani
- Aarthi
- Manju
- S. Kamalakannan
- Sampath Ram
- Kadhal Dhandapani
- Kadhal Sukumar
- Nellai Siva
- Ambani Shankar

== Production ==
The core theme of the film was based on the Vietnamese martial art called Vovinam. Sanam Shetty signed up to play dual roles in the film - that of a traditional girl from the 1970s and a modern-day college student. Sanam appeared in action scenes for the first time in her career and performed stunts without a stunt double. The action scenes in the film was shot in the forests surrounding Madurai.

== Soundtrack ==
The soundtrack was composed by Srikanth Deva.

All lyrics are written by Snehan.

No.	Title	Singer(s)	Length
1.	"Aariraro Aariraro"	Janaki Iyer
2.	"Jolly Jollyda Nanba"	Ranjith
3.	"Aedho Ondru Nenjukulla"	Karthik, Chinmayi
4.	"Enge Enge"	Harish Raghavendra

== Release and reception ==
The film was released on 7 August 2015. A reviewer from The New Indian Express wrote that "A weak script, lackluster narration and insipid performances ensure that the film falls in the to-be-missed-list". A reviewer from Maalai Malar gave the film a negative review, criticising most aspects of the film-making. A critic from the entertainment portal Iflicks.in gave the film a positive review, noting the director "has made efforts to make a complete entertainer with a story that focuses on self-defense martial arts."
