= Dhoorathu Pachai =

- Title card
- Directed by: Manobala
- Written by: A. L. Narayanan (dialogues)
- Screenplay by: M. S. Madhu
- Produced by: N. Sivarajaan
- Starring: Karthik; Suhasini; Tulasi
- Cinematography: P. C. Sreeram
- Edited by: A. Selvanathan
- Music by: Ilaiyaraaja
- Production company: Sri Lakshmi Art Movies
- Release date: 24 July 1987
- Country: India
- Language: Tamil

Dhoorathu Pachai (transl. Green in the distance) is a 1987 Indian Tamil-language film directed by Manobala, starring Karthik, Suhasini and Tulasi. It was released on 24 July 1987, after two years of delay.

== Cast ==
- Karthik as Karthik
- Suhasini as Suhasini
- Tulasi as Tulasi
- Goundamani
- Manorama as Manorama
- Vadivukkarasi as Vadivukkarasi
- V. K. Ramasamy
- Sathyajith

== Production ==
The film began production under the title Endrum Nee (transl. Forever you) and took two years to complete.

== Soundtrack ==
The music was composed by Ilaiyaraaja.

Song	Singers	Lyrics
"Ithu Varaiyil Muthal Iravu"	Krishnachandran, S. P. Sailaja	Vaali
"Deepangale Oli Thoovungale"	S. P. Balasubrahmanyam	Gangai Amaran
"Aanantha Maalai Tholserum"	S. Janaki, Krishnachandran	Vairamuthu
"Vizhiye Nalama"	Gangai Amaran, Vani Jairam	Pulamaipithan

== Reception ==
The Indian Express wrote, "Thoorathu Pachai moves briskly but the climax is all mixed up".
