= Naanayam =

- Film poster
- Directed by: Shakti Soundar Rajan
- Written by: Shakti Soundar Rajan
- Produced by: S. P. Charan
- Starring: Prasanna; Sibiraj; S. P. Balasubrahmanyam; Ramya Raj; Yasmin
- Cinematography: Om Prakash
- Edited by: Praveen K. L. N. B. Srikanth
- Music by: James Vasanthan; Background score: Thaman S
- Production company: Capital Film Works
- Distributed by: S. P. Balasubrahmanyam
- Release date: 14 January 2010
- Running time: 136 minutes
- Country: India
- Language: Tamil

Naanayam (transl. Integrity / Currency) is a 2010 Indian Tamil-language heist thriller film written and directed by Shakti Soundar Rajan in his directorial debut. Produced by Atharsh Capital Film Works, the film stars Prasanna, Sibiraj, S. P. Balasubrahmanyam, Ramya Raj, and debutante Yasmin. The songs were composed by James Vasanthan, and the score was by Thaman S. The film released on 14 January 2010.

== Plot ==
Ravi is an electronics engineer who aspires to become a businessman. He meets Viswanath, the CEO of Trust Bank, on a golf course when he fights to grab Viswanath's bag from a stranger. Ravi saves Viswanath and chases the stranger. He is unable to catch the man, but glimpses his face. Viswanath thanks Ravi, offers him a job at his bank, and assures him that he will provide a loan of Rs. 2 crores to start his own business. The bank promotes its new branch as the "world's safest bank" with the security locker designed by Ravi. Ravi works at Trust Bank for five years, but his loan approval gets rejected so many times despite Viswanath's attempts to get it approved.

Ravi meets a divorced news reporter Nandhini in a golf club. They become friends, and slowly, love blossoms between them. However, during his date with Nandhini, Ravi is attacked by Nandhini's ex-husband Raghu. Ravi counterattacks Raghu and goes home. At home, Ravi meets Fareed, who says that Ravi killed Raghu and there are evidences to prove it. Fareed also kidnaps Nandhini. Ravi is confident that he did not kill Raghu, but he has to obey the words of helping rob the bank to save himself and Nandhini.

Fareed says that he is an ex-employee of Trust Bank and was fired by Viswanath for fund mismanagement. As a result, he wants to take revenge on Viswanath by robbing Trust Bank (which will negatively impact its trustworthiness) and also wants Ravi to help him, as he is the one behind the safety system design. Ravi and Fareed plan to rob the bank, which has infrared lasers and a four-level lock system vault. Meanwhile, Ravi records the conversations and hands them to his assistant Devaki to save himself. Ravi demands Rs. 2 Crore, the photographic evidence of the murder from the robbers before the theft. Fareed initially gives it but takes it back and gives Ravi another bag similar to it.

Ravi discloses all the security systems to enter the vault, which Fareed and his men enter as per plan. However, Ravi did not inform them of a secret exit in the vault, and he plans to trap Fareed and his men. Ravi suddenly escapes through the secret exit, locks others inside the vault, and rushes to meet Viswanath, where he also sees Nandhini with him. Ravi is shocked seeing Nandhini with Viswanath and figures out the truth. The robbery is actually Viswanath's plan. He executed it to grab the bag, which has evidence of his illegal affair with Nandhini, who is actually named Eswari. The stranger took pictures of Viswanath and Eswari and blackmailed Viswanath for money. The stranger also safely placed the evidence in Trust Bank's locker. To steal the evidence, Viswanath planned a robbery with Fareed, Eswari's brother. The man whom Ravi was told to kill was actually a new employee in Fareed's gang. Viswanath apologises to Ravi for the trouble he created and commits suicide. Fareed and Eswari are arrested, and all of Fareed's gang members die inside the vault due to a lack of oxygen.

Ravi destroys all evidence of Viswanath's illegal affair and finds Rs. 2 Crore in the back of his car, which he demanded from Fareed and uses to start his new business.

== Cast ==
- Prasanna as Ravi
- Sibiraj as Fareed
- S. P. Balasubrahmanyam as Viswanath
- Ramya Raj as Eshwari / Nandhini (Voice dubbed by Suchithra)
- Yasmin as Devaki
- Vijaya as Mrs. Viswanath
- Jasper as Logu
- Jayanth as Pandi
- Sundarapandian as Imran
- Magi as Inspector Venkat
- R. Senthil as Senthil
- Arunachalam as Rangarajan
- V. Viswanath as Murali
- Rathnavelu as Bhaskar

== Production ==
Naanayam is the directorial debut of Shakti, and was completed by November 2009. Om Prakash was chosen as the cinematographer after Sakthi saw his work in Danger (2005).

== Music ==
The songs were composed by James Vasanthan and the film score (BGM) was composed by Thaman S. The title song was based on "Owner of a Lonely Heart" by Yes.

Track listing
No.	Title	Lyrics	Singer(s)	Length
1.	"Naanayam" (Version 1)	Dr. Krithaya	Ranjith	2:01
2.	"Ka Ka Ka"	Kavivarman	Silambarasan, Devi Sri Prasad	5:19
3.	"Aasa Aasa"	James Vasanthan	Kannan, Megha, Ramya NSK, Sheba & Chorus	5:43
4.	"Naan Pogiren"	Thamarai	S. P. Balasubrahmanyam, K. S. Chithra	6:31
5.	"Kooda Kooda"	Yugabharathi	Sunitha Sarathy	5:55
6.	"Naanayam" (Version 2)	Dr. Krithaya	Ranjith	3:37
Total length:				29:06

== Release ==
The film was released on 14 January 2010 on Pongal.

=== Reception ===
Pavithra Srinivasan of Rediff.com claimed that Prasanna is "sweet, savvy, intense and desperate as the situation demands" and that his diction "too is superb". She added that Sibiraj, who makes more of an impact, despite that "he apes his esteemed father often, especially in tone of voice and modulation" but "he seems to have had a blast doing it". Ramya Raj has "more than one role to play, and does justice to it" whilst Balasubrahmanyam plays his role with "élan". Malathi Rangarajan of The Hindu wrote, "It’s obvious that director Shakti Rajan has worked hard to provide a refreshing fare. Surely he could have toiled a little more and got the pace right". Sify wrote, "Prasanna as the nice guy in a bad situation is impressive and carries the show, while Sibiraj as the mean bad man is a revelation. Ramya and Yasmin are their mostly for the songs [...] Let us hope that director Sakthi S Rajan takes a little more care on his scripts and churns out the perfect thriller in future".

=== Box office ===
The film opened at fourth at the Chennai box office, and Sify said it had a "lukewarm opening".
