= Paarthal Pasu =

- DVD cover
- Directed by: K. S. Gopalakrishnan
- Written by: K. S. Gopalakrishnan
- Produced by: G. Chinnadurai; G. Ravikumar
- Starring: Ramarajan; Chandrasekhar; Pallavi; Sri Bharathi
- Cinematography: Suresh
- Edited by: R. Devarajan
- Music by: Ilaiyaraaja
- Production company: C. R. Production
- Release date: 10 June 1988
- Country: India
- Language: Tamil

Paarthal Pasu is a 1988 Indian Tamil-language mystery thriller film, written and directed by K. S. Gopalakrishnan. The film stars Ramarajan, Chandrasekhar, Pallavi and Sri Bharathi. It was released on 10 June 1988, and failed at the box office.

== Plot ==
Shankar, a lawyer, gets entangled in a complex case involving deceit and murder when his fiancée, Ratna, a policewoman, learns about an illicit operation where a police officer is involved in helping a criminal run a brothel. Determined to bring the corrupt officer to justice, Ratna enlists the help of her fiancé, Shankar. Together, they navigate through a dangerous web of crime and corruption to expose the truth and seek justice.

== Cast ==
- Ramarajan as Lawyer Shankar
- Chandrasekhar
- Pallavi as Rathna
- Sri Bharathi as Mynaa
- Thaarani
- S. S. Chandran
- Senthil
- Senthamarai
- G. Seenivasan
- Karnan
- Achamillai Gopi
- C. S. Pandiyan
- Nagaraja Chozhan
- Peeli Sivam
- T. A. Balaji
- Oru Viral Krishna Rao
- Major Sundarrajan in Guest Appearance
- Poornam Viswanathan in Guest Appearance
- Veera Raghavan in Guest Appearance

== Soundtrack ==
The music was composed by Ilaiyaraaja.

Song	Singers	Lyrics	Length
"En Rasa Yaro"	K. S. Chithra	Pulamaipithan	04:43
"Sinnamani Ponnumani"	S. P. Sailaja	Gangai Amaran	04:37
"Aadai Maatra"	K. S. Chithra	Gangai Amaran	03:39

== Reception ==
The Indian Express wrote that the film "means to exploit audience's weaknesses to the hilt". This movie turned out to be a flop movie.
