= Uthama Raasa =

1993 film by Raj Kapoor

- Theatrical release poster
- Directed by: Raj Kapoor
- Written by: Raj Kapoor
- Produced by: K. Balu
- Starring: Prabhu; Khushbu
- Cinematography: Velu Prabhakaran
- Edited by: Ganesh–Kumar
- Music by: Ilaiyaraaja
- Production company: K. B. Films
- Release date: 23 April 1993
- Running time: 141 minutes
- Country: India
- Language: Tamil

Uthama Raasa (transl. Righteous King) is a 1993 Indian Tamil-language film directed by Raj Kapoor, starring Prabhu, Khushbu, Radha Ravi and Raja, while Goundamani, Senthil, Vaishnavi, Manorama, S. N. Lakshmi, and Charle play supporting roles. It was released on 23 April 1993.

== Plot ==
The feud between Chinnaiya and Parama Thevar has not eased up in eighteen years. In his teenage years, Chinnaiya had cut Parama Thevar's hands because the latter killed Chinnaiya's father, which is witnessed by Parama Thevar's daughter Mangai. This results in Mangai having blood trauma, and all her marriage proposals failed to materialize due to this.

Here comes Meenakshi alias Meenu, who is Chinnaiya's cousin, completing her studies in the city. Both of them are in love since young, but do not tell each other. Marudhu, the son of Parama Thevar, falls for Meenu's beauty. Marudhu takes pictures of Meenu, thinking of her. Once during a village festival, Chinnaiya fights with Marudhu, which results in Meenu accusing Chinnaiya. However, they soon reconcile.

Meenu's friends come from town to bring her to a wedding. Before they leave with her, they manipulate Meenu to put up a drama with Chinnaiya for fun. Though reluctant, Meenu agrees. She falsely tells Chinnaiya that she is in love with a guy, much to Chinnaiya's disappointment. At that moment, his mother, Aatha, goes to fix an alliance for Chinnaiya and Meenu.

Chinnaiya spots Meenu and Marudhu together, which happened to be an accidental meeting. He mistakes them to be a couple and thinks that Meenu is in love with Marudhu. This worsens after he sees pictures of Meenu taken by Marudhu. Meenu, feeling guilty and unable to open up to her uncle, gives him an envelope with Chinnaiya's photo in it. She tells him that she is in love with the person in the photograph and cannot imagine life without him. She leaves for the wedding, and Chinnaiya thinks that it is a picture of Marudhu.

Without his mother's knowledge and forgetting the enmity between Parama Thevar, Chinnaiya goes to fix alliance for Meenu's sake. There, Parama Thevar asks Chinnaiya to marry Mangai, to which he agrees. Meenu comes back and gets shocked. She thereafter tries to change Chinnaiya's mind, who on the other hand, an honest keeper. Parama Thevar had actually planned to take all of Meenu's property and chase her out of the house, and kill Chinnaiya before his wedding with Mangai. Parama Thevar's mother overhears this and is later killed by Parama Thevar.

Mangai later discovers the truth about Meenu and Chinnaiya. She tells her father, and Marudhu is heartbroken. Parama Thevar vows revenge. When Chinnaiya's mother comes to break the alliance, Parama Thevar humiliated her by making his men walk naked around her. Angered, Chinnaiya goes to kill Parama Thevar and on the way, spots Mangai married to Chinnaiya's servant. Marudhu gives up his love.

Once again humiliated, Parama Thevar decides to kill Chinnaiya and to marry Meenu. Chinnaiya rescues Meenu and marries her in front of Parama Thevar. The villagers gather and plan to bury Parama Thevar alive for all his misdeeds. Chinnaiya intervenes and tells the villagers that Parama Thevar's punishment is his life from that moment on. As the villagers make a move, Parama Thevar takes a sickle to kill Chinnaiya, but he is killed by Marudhu.

The film ends with Chinnaiya and Meenu leading a happy life.

== Cast ==
- Prabhu as Chinnaiya
- Khushbu as Meenakshi
- Radha Ravi as Parama Thevar
- Raja as Marudhu
- Goundamani as Ondipuli
- Senthil as Vellayathevan
- Vaishnavi as Mangai
- Manorama as Chinnaiya's mother
- S. N. Lakshmi as Parama Thevar's mother
- Charle as Chinnaiya's servant
- Thyagu
- Sethu Vinayagam
- Rangammal
- Senthamarai
- Venkatesh
- Boobathi Raja
- Manikkaraj
- Durga
- Shanthi
- Chandrika
- Bindhu
- Pandiyan

== Soundtrack ==
The music was composed by Ilaiyaraaja, with lyrics by Vaali.

Song	Singers	Length
"Intha Maamanoda"	S. P. Balasubrahmanyam, S. Janaki	04:51
"Nalla Neram"	S. P. Balasubrahmanyam	05:09
"Nandri Unakku"	Malaysia Vasudevan	05:54
"Paavalaru Pattu"	Mano	05:04
"Unna Maathi Paakkaamal"	S. P. Balasubrahmanyam, S. Janaki	05:06
"Vaaya Vaaya"	S. P. Balasubrahmanyam, S. Janaki	05:09

== Reception ==
Malini Mannath of The Indian Express wrote, "Lovely music, good camerawork, fine performance by the lead pair [..] make the film an entertainer".
