= Aruvadai Naal =

1986 film by G. M. Kumar

- Theatrical release poster
- Directed by: G. M. Kumar
- Screenplay by: G. M. Kumar; R. P. Viswam (dialogues)
- Story by: Livi
- Produced by: Shanthi Narayanasamy; T. Manohar
- Starring: Prabhu; Pallavi
- Cinematography: B. R. Vijayalakshmi
- Edited by: Shyam
- Music by: Ilaiyaraaja
- Production company: Sivaji Productions
- Release date: 1 November 1986
- Running time: 130 minutes
- Country: India
- Language: Tamil

Aruvadai Naal (transl. Harvest Day) is a 1986 Indian Tamil-language romantic drama film directed by G. M. Kumar in his debut. The film stars Prabhu and Pallavi. It was released on 1 November 1986. The film was remade in Telugu as Muvva Gopaludu (1987).

== Plot ==
Nirmala, an orphan Christian girl, lives in a convent and she wants to become a nun. She is then sent to a village by the convent to become a nun. She joins, the church's father Vincent Parker Soosai and she works as a nurse until she becomes a nun.

She then meets Muthuvel, an innocent young man, and they fall in love. Rathnavel brings up his son Muthuvel without any affections and treats him like his worker, whereas his mother Vadivu loves him more than anything. When Rathnavel arranges Muthuvel's marriage with his niece, Muthuvel and Nirmala reveal to him about their love. Rathnavel finally accepts their marriage with Soosai's help. Nirmala is eager about her wedding and leaves the village taking with her the convent's sisters.

In the meantime, Rathnavel prepares the puberty ceremony of Rajalakshmi, Muthuvel's niece, and manages to hide a Thaali inside a flower garland. Muthuvel, as an uncle and as per the customs, puts the flower garland around Rajalakshmi's neck and he married her without knowing. Soosai complains against Rathnavel for arranging a child marriage but the complaint is withdrawn. The rest of the story is what happens to Muthuvel and Nirmala.

== Cast ==
- Prabhu as Muthuvel
- Pallavi as Nirmala
- R. P. Viswam as Rathnavel
- Vadivukkarasi as Vadivu
- Raasi as Rajalakshmi
- Kumarimuthu as Lotha
- Sathyajith
- Usilai Mani
- Kovai Senthil
- Ramkumar as Vincent Parker Soosai
- Raj Kapoor as a police officer (uncredited)

== Production ==
Aruvadai Naal is the directorial debut of G. M. Kumar, and the story was written by Livingston. The film was originally to be produced by Vigranth Creations and was to feature debut actors. Sivaji Ganesan's elder son Ramkumar made his acting debut with this film. According to Kumar, Aruvadai Naal was "chopped mercilessly" by the censor board. The voice for the film's lead actress Pallavi was given by another actress Uma Bharani. The song "Melatha Mella" was filmed at Prakash Studios.

== Soundtrack ==
The soundtrack was composed by Ilaiyaraaja, with lyrics by Gangai Amaran. Kumar said the song "Devanin Kovil" was almost removed from the film because Ilaiyaraaja felt the film did not need it, but the former successfully pushed for the song to be retained.

Song	Singer(s)	Length
"Chinna Ponnu"	Malaysia Vasudevan, S. Janaki, Vani Jairam	4:45
"Devanin Kovil"	Ilaiyaraaja, K. S. Chithra	4:39
"Melatha Mella"	Malaysia Vasudevan, S. Janaki	4:42
"Naanga"	Gangai Amaran, Malaysia Vasudevan	4:33
"Ola Kuruththola"	S. Janaki	4:39
"Oru Kaaviam"	Ilaiyaraaja	4:36
"Vakkapattu"	Malaysia Vasudevan	4:25

== Release and reception ==
Aruvadai Naal was released on 1 November 1986, Diwali day. The Indian Express praised the film, saying, "Kumar and his team of technicians [..] have been courageous enough to make this film somewhat of an offbeat effort". Jayamanmadhan of Kalki wrote Aruvadai Naal is a film with unstriped margins that can tear the hand but with a different glow.
