= Maayai =

2013 Indian film by J. R. Kannan

- Directed by: J. R. Kannan
- Written by: J. R. Kannan
- Produced by: J. R. Kannan
- Starring: J. R. Kannan; Sanam Shetty; Sanjay
- Music by: J. Raj; Manish
- Production company: Halamma Talkies
- Release date: 23 November 2013
- Country: India
- Language: Tamil

Maayai (transl. Illusion) is a 2013 Indian Tamil-language action drama film written, produced and directed by J. R. Kannan. The film stars Kannan himself, Sanam Shetty and Sanjay. It was released on 22 November 2013.

== Cast ==
- J. R. Kannan
- Sanam Shetty
- Sanjay
- Rajendran
- Manobala
- Raj Kapoor
- Fathima Babu
- Cheran Raj
- Kaajal Pasupathi as Police officer

== Production ==
J. R. Kannan, an erstwhile assistant to directors Indiran and Yesudas, opted to launch his own film as director and producer, and named the studio as Halamma, after his family's deity. He also chose to play the lead role, alongside Sanjay and Sanam Shetty. Kannan recruited his former classmate, J. Raj — a composer in the Badaga language — to be the film's music composer. The audio soundtrack of the film was released in a ceremony by director S. P. Muthuraman and received by producer-director Keyaar.

== Release and reception ==
The film was released on 22 November 2013 alongside Selvaraghavan's Irandam Ulagam at the Chennai box office. The Times of India's reviewer gave the film a negative review, stating "it takes a special kind of talent to totally make a mess out of a minimalist thriller" and that "the film has the vibe of a shoddily-made student film and it becomes difficult to take it seriously". A critic from Maalai Malar also gave the film a negative review.

The film took a poor opening at the Chennai box office and did not perform well commercially.
