= Thagadu =

2016 Indian Tamil film by M. Thangadurai

- Directed by: M. Thangadurai
- Written by: M. Thangadurai
- Produced by: Rakadevi
- Starring: Prabha; Ajay; Sanam Shetty
- Cinematography: Charles Melvin
- Music by: Karthikeyan S
- Production company: Thai Thanthai Movies
- Release date: 2 September 2016
- Country: India
- Language: Tamil

Thagadu is a 2016 Indian Tamil-language action drama film written and directed by M. Thangadurai. The film stars Prabha, Ajay and Sanam Shetty in the lead roles. It was released on 2 September 2016.

== Cast ==
- Prabha
- Ajay
- Sanam Shetty
- Ram Kiran
- Vivin
- Priyanka Shukla
- Aysha
- R. Deepak Raj
- Raj Kapoor as King's Minister
- Mippu as Rowdy
- Rajendran Kuppusamy
- M. Thangadurai
- Sabitha Anand
- Nellai Siva as Park officer
- Hasika Dutt in a special appearance

== Production ==
Sanam Shetty was cast to play a princess. The film stars several newcomers who play college students in the film. The historical portions were shot at Kangundi Fort in Andhra Pradesh. Prabha and Ajay play lead roles in the film.

An audio launch was held in July 2016 with Tamil film industry personalities such as R. K. Selvamani, T. Siva and Perarasu in attendance.

== Release ==
The Times of India Samayam gave the film a rating of two out of five stars. The reviewer praised the historical scenes while criticizing the story. A critic from Maalai Malar also gave the film a negative review, concluding that the tale was "old". A review from the film portal Iflicks.com noted "the story could have been narrated in a short time, the unwanted extension of the sequences seem to drag the movie."
