= Sandai =

- Poster
- Directed by: Sakthi Chidambaram
- Written by: Ravi Mariya (Dialogue)
- Screenplay by: Sakthi Chidambaram
- Story by: Sakthi Chidambaram
- Produced by: Radha Sakthi Chidambaram
- Starring: Sundar C Nadhiya; Namitha; Ramya Raj
- Cinematography: K. S. Selva Raj
- Edited by: G. Sasikumar
- Music by: Dhina
- Production company: Cinema Paradise
- Release date: 21 March 2008
- Country: India
- Language: Tamil

Sandai (transl. Fight) is a 2008 Indian Tamil-language action comedy film directed by Sakthi Chidambaram. The film stars Sundar C, Nadhiya, Namitha and Ramya Raj, while Vivek, Lalu Alex, and Mithun Tejasvi, among others, play supporting roles. The music was composed by Dhina with cinematography handled by K. S. Selva Raj and editing by G. Sasikumar. The film was released on 21 March 2008, and became a commercial success.

== Plot ==
Thangalakshmi, a wealthy woman, arranges a marriage for her daughter Abhinaya with a non-resident Indian (NRI) in her native village. A gang led by Paalpandi, who is later revealed to be Thangalakshmi's brother, keeps stalking Abhi and Thangalskhmi. A rogue called Kathhi, who does anything for money, is appointed as Abhi's bodyguard until her marriage to the NRI groom.

Paalpandi makes repeated unsuccessful attempts to convince Thangalakshmi to marry Abhi off to his son. In a strange turn of events, the stepfather and cousins of Thangalakshmi's husband Kamaraj (a former District Collector), who claim to have been innocently jailed on the charges of killing him, are released and kill the judge and public prosecutor responsible for their imprisonment. They also enter into Thangalakshmi's good books by manipulating her into believing that they are innocent and Paalpandi is the real killer, a fact which Thangalakshmi herself has been believing herself due to a misunderstanding.

In due course of events, during which Kathhi and Mani (Thangalakshmi's PA who also wants to secretly marry Abhi) comically try to thwart Abhi's marriage, the groom gets kidnapped by Kamaraj's relatives, who try to kill him to pin the blame on Paalpandi. Kathi intervenes, bashing them and their goons up and saving the groom, who then refuses to marry Abhi, honouring the words of his parents. Arriving at the venue along with his men, Paalpandi once gain tries to convince Thangalakshmi into marrying Abhi off to his son. Refusing to give in due to her sense of pride, Thangalakshmi forces Abhi and Kathhi to get marries and taunts Paalpandi by saying that she fulfilled her oath. At the same time, Paalpandi starts laughing and mockingly reveals that Kathhi is none other than his son, his real name being Kathiresan MBA.

Shocked, Abhi and Thangalakshmi try to foist charges of kidnapping and criminal intimidation on Kathiresan, who successfully manages to evade charges by showing the DSP the video recording of the events at the marriage hall. Abhi and Thangalakshmi try to run away to Bangkok but are waylaid by Kathiresan, who challenges Thangalakshmi to make Abhi accept him as her husband after staying in his house for seven days, while also promising that he would try to engage in physical contact with Abhi without her consent.

Initially getting off to a rocky start with her relatives on the maternal side, Abhi comes to understand Kathir's and the family's caring and loving nature. All attempts by Thangalakshmi to separate Abhi and Kathiresan fail, with towards the end, she too coming to understand her brother's innocence and the good nature of Kathiresan and her family.

In the climax, Kamaraj's relatives attempt to kill Thangalakshmi, and she manages to place a call to Kathiresan, who arrives at the right time and rescues her but gets stabbed by the villains in the process. After Paalpandi arrives at the spot and sees Thangalakshmi standing beside his son with a blood-stained knife, he still believes her, making her realise her folly. Kathiresan, who has not yet lost consciousness, bounces back and kills the villains after a thrilling fight. Thangalakshmi reunites with her family, and they all live happily ever after.

== Cast ==
- Sundar C as Kathiresan alias Kaththi
- Nadhiya as Thangalakshmi
- Namitha as Seemakal Chinnakilli
- Ramya Raj as Abhinaya Kathiresan (voice dubbed by Savitha Radhakrishnan)
- Vivek in a dual role as Mani and Thangapandi
- Napoleon as District Collector Kamaraj
- Lalu Alex as Paalpandi, Kathiresan's father
- Mithun Tejasvi as Abhi's ex-fiance
- Kadhal Dhandapani as Kamaraj's paternal uncle
- Ravi Mariya as Kamaraj's cousin
- Raj Kapoor as Kamaraj's cousin
- Meera Krishnan as Kathiresan's's mother
- Paravai Muniyamma as Kathiresan's grandmother
- Vichu Vishwanath as Kathiresan's cousin
- Jyothi Lakshmi as Mani's mother
- Delhi Kumar as Duraipandi
- Uma Padmanabhan as DSP
- Thalapathy Dinesh as fighter
- Bonda Mani as Mani's troupe member
- Bava Lakshmanan as Balu
- T. P. Gajendran
- Kili Ramachandran as Mani's troupe member
- Amirthalingam as a stage artist
- Suja Varunee (special appearance in the song "Pokkirina")

== Production ==
During launch, the film was titled Porukki; as the title was criticised as derogatory, Sakthi Chidambaram retitled it to Adhirudhulla, after the usage of the term as a catchphrase in Sivaji: The Boss (2007). However he later felt it had become clichéd due to its popularity and subsequent overuse, so he opted for Mahamagam, in reference to the Mahamaham festival which features in the story, but later finalised Sandai. The film was launched on 3 August 2007 at AVM Studios. Filming was held at locations including Pollachi, Karaikudi, Switzerland and London.

== Soundtrack ==
Music is composed by Dhina and released via T-Series. It includes a remix of the song "Vaadi En Kappa Kelange", composed by Ilaiyaraaja for Alaigal Oivathillai (1981), and the remix marked the singing debut of Sundar C. The dappankuthu song "Pokkirina" invokes the names of contemporary Tamil stars and their films, namely Vijay and Pokkiri (2007), Ajith Kumar and Villain (2002); Dhanush and Polladhavan (2007).

Track listing
No.	Title	Lyrics	Singer(s)	Length
1.	"Pokkirina"	Na. Muthukumar	Silambarasan	4:50
2.	"October Madathil"	Ravi Mariya	Shaan, Rita	5:49
3.	"Vaadi En"	Gangai Amaran	Sundar C, Grace Karunas	5:26
4.	"Aathadi"	Na. Muthukumar	T. Rajendar, Dev Prakash	4:37
5.	"Maduraikara"	Sakthi Chidambaram	Udit Narayan, Anuradha Sriram	5:29
Total length:				26:11

== Release ==
Sandai was released on 21 March 2008, Good Friday. Moser Baer released the film via home video in June 2009.

== Reception ==
Pavithra Srinivasan of Rediff.com called the film "illogical" and stated that "Just suspend all logic and reason before settling for this age-old mother-in-law/son-in-law battle movies on the lines of Poova Thalaiya and Mappillai." Sify wrote "Here is regressive piece of kitsch, with over-the-top loud performances. The plot degenerates into a farce in the second half of this tedious film as it tumbles to an all?s-well-that- concludes-well end". Naresh of The Indian Express wrote, "One star for Sundar C. and one star for Shakthi Chidambaram for his fast paced narration". Cinesouth wrote, "This is a typical 'maappillai' type masala film story but director Shakti Chidambaram has given it an exciting flavour". Malathi Rangarajan of The Hindu wrote, "Director Shakti Chidambaram’s story and screenplay throw logic to the winds. Instead the director dangles a few carrots in the form of Namitha (with oodles of flab), scatology and risqué dialogue, not in the same order".
