= Sadhuram 2 =

2016 Indian film by Sumanth Radhakrishnan

- Theatrical release poster
- Directed by: Sumanth Radhakrishnan
- Written by: Sumanth Radhakrishnan
- Starring: Roheit Nair; Yog Japee; Riaz; Sanam Shetty; Suja Varunee
- Cinematography: Sathish. G
- Edited by: SP Raja Sethupathi
- Music by: Girish Gopalakrishnan
- Production companies: Knockout Entertainment, Grey Matter Studios, Paranjothi Productions
- Release date: 16 September 2016
- Running time: 94 minutes
- Country: India
- Language: Tamil

Sadhuram 2 (transl. The Square) is a 2016 Indian Tamil language action thriller film written and directed by Sumanth Radhakrishnan. The film stars Roheit Nair, Yog Japee, Riaz, and Brihadish Kaushik in lead roles, while Suja Varunee and Sanam Shetty played the two female supporting roles. Grey Matter Studios and Knockout Entertainment bankrolled the venture and Paranjothi Productions released it. The film was popularised as being the first philanthropical thriller in India, along the lines of the SAW series. The film, which commenced filming in end of 2014, was released on 16 September 2016. The film opened to good critical acclaim and an average box office collection. The movie is a remake of the 2004 American movie Saw.

== Plot ==
Vishal (Riaz) and Dr. Vasudevan (Yog Japee) wake up one day to find out that they both are stuck inside a square room devoid of any furniture. The only other element in the room apart from the two of them is the dead body of a man lying in the middle of the room, blood soaked. Vishal and Vasudevan do not know each other. Soon, Vishal realizes that there is a tape recorder near him, he finds a cassette in his pocket, which he plays. The cassette welcomes him to the SQUARE and tells him that his only way of escaping is by finding a clue that only the guy opposite him can see. Soon, Vasudevan plays the cassette from his pocket, and the recording again welcomes him to the SQUARE and tells him that he has been doing a lot of good by saving lives as a doctor, and yet he has committed a grave mistake, which he is now getting punished for. He is told that there is only eight hours remaining for him to escape, and his escape would only be by killing the one opposite him. Vishal, unwilling to cooperate with Vasudevan, cries and screams, asking the kidnapper to let him go. Finally coming to terms with their capture, encouraged to think objectively by Vasudevan, Vishal gives in. They both start working together to find out ways to escape by charting the clues the kidnapper gives.

Meanwhile, on another plane, Siva Subramaniam (Roheit Nair), working in a multinational company, is told that he has been selected as the "Employee of the Decade" and will have to collect his coveted award from their Delhi Headquarters. He comes home to a good news that his wife Dhivya (Suja Varunee), who is pregnant, has conceived twin babies. Overly rejoiced, the couple celebrates their good luck.

As Vasudevan and Vishal discuss, recall, and think, we uncover their personal lives. Vasudevan, a reputed doctor from a government medical centre is married and has a teenage daughter. However, he has an ongoing relationship with one of his trainee students – Dr. Preethi (Sanam Shetty). While he is honest for the most part of his professional life, he is threatened by another trainee student Dr. Shankar (Brihadish Kaushik) to rewrite a postmortem report of a rape victim in favour of the accused (an MP's son). He is threatened with photos of him with Preethi. Scared, Vasudevan sells out.

Vishal, on the other hand, is a photographer who takes pictures of people in their intimate moments, mostly done on request by certain clients. One such assignment he was given by Shankar was to follow and take pictures of Vasudevan along with Preethi. Vasudevan gets shocked upon knowing that Vishal already knows him and is partly the reason why he is in the SQUARE.

Meanwhile, Siva and Dhivya prepare to leave to Delhi to receive his award, but their flight meets with a tragic accident.

Back in the square, Vasudevan tells Vishal that a few months earlier, a lawyer was killed brutally in a similar fashion of the dead man in the middle of the room. He says that he was suspected of that murder as he was the lawyer who had demanded that he change the postmortem report. Although his innocence was proved, one CB-CID police officer named Aadhi (Birla Bose) still suspected Vasudevan. Upon getting a certain lead, long after the case got over, Aadhi goes in search of the killer (then deemed serial killer) sure that it was Vasudevan. The killer escapes from his clutches, in the process gravely injuring him, puncturing his vocal cord. Long after, Aadhi still tries to pin the whole case on Vasudevan, hoping to catch him at his weakest.

Vishal and Vasudevan suspect that their kidnapper might be Shankar. Vasudevan discovers that his wife and daughter have been kidnapped by him too, as a security measure in case Vasudevan tries to escape. Heartbroken and with no way out, Vasudevan starts realizing the value of his family, the love that they have for him, and the love that he has for them.

We go back in time to see that Dhivya finds out that Siva is terminally ill and has been undergoing treatment without telling her a word about it. She then breaks down and cries. Siva tells her that not everyone gets the best in life. He then asks her to appreciate what they have got in life.

Aadhi goes to Vasudevan's office, suspecting something. Inside, Shankar holds Vasudevan's wife and daughter captive. They try to escape and hear a gunshot. Aadhi arrives at the spot. Shankar escapes from him and heads elsewhere.

Vasudevan, unable to wait for rescue any longer and losing his patience, decides to break free by cutting his leg free from the chain. Vishal tries to stop him. Vasudevan shoots Vishal, like the kidnapper commanded earlier, and breaks away to leave the square. Meanwhile, Shankar and Aadhi have a tough fight, at the end of which Shankar kills Aadhi. He comes to the square to finish the two of them. However, Vishal regains consciousness and kills Shankar in the process. Vishal also realizes the Vasudevan had carefully shot him on his shoulder so as to not mortally injure him. Vasudevan then escapes the square. Vishal tries to escape by checking for the lock code from Shankar's body when the dead body in his midst wakes up. It is Siva, and he is the mastermind behind the whole square.

Siva, who upon recovering from his flight accident, finds out about the girl's rape and how the lawyer, Shankar, and Vasudevan played their part in defending the convict. He realizes that Vishal was instrumental in instigating this and spoiling several other lives by clicking pictures of their intimate moments. He decides to destroy all their lives. He kills the lawyer first, pushes Shankar to kidnap Vishal and Vasudevan, and thereafter Vasudevan's wife and kid.

In the end, Siva tells Vishal that all he had to do was cooperate and work with Vasudevan to find his escape lock code, which is written right on his back. Siva tells him that he has lost and he deserves to rot in the square. Siva leaves the square, promising to return with others who do not appreciate their lives.

== Cast ==
- Roheit Nair as Siva Subramaniam
- Yog Japee as Dr. Vasudevan
- Riaz as Vishal
- Brihadish Koushik as Dr. Shankar
- Suja Varunee as Dhivya
- Sanam Shetty as Dr. Preethi
- Birla Bose as CB-CID Aadhi
- Ravishankar as Sundeep
- Suja Venkat as Sheela
- Trishula as Rohini

== Release ==
The film was released by Grey Matter Studios and Knockout Entertainment. Chennai theatrical rights was bagged by SPI Cinemas. The film released in over 100 screens across the nation on 16 September 2016.

=== Critical reception ===
"Sadhuram 2 is fairly faithful remake." Says The Hindu. "The director keeps cutting between these various plots, which enhances the disorienting feeling that we have." said The Times of India in their review of Sadhuram 2.

== Awards and accolades ==
The film was an official entry in the IIFA Utsavam 2017.
