= Ramachandra (film) =

2003 film by Raj Kapoor

- Title card
- Directed by: Raj Kapoor
- Screenplay by: Raj Kapoor
- Story by: Posani Krishna Murali
- Produced by: Singanamala Ramesh Babu
- Starring: Sathyaraj; Pandiarajan; Vijayalakshmi; Ashish Vidyarthi
- Cinematography: B. Balamurugan
- Edited by: V. T. Vijayan
- Music by: Deva
- Production company: Kanagarathna Movies
- Release date: 15 January 2003
- Running time: 146 minutes
- Country: India
- Language: Tamil

Ramachandra is a 2003 Indian Tamil-language action film, directed by Raj Kapoor, starring Sathyaraj and Vijayalakshmi. The film was released on 15 January 2003. It is a remake of the 1995 Telugu film Khaidi Inspector.

== Plot ==
Ramachandran is a police inspector who is sentenced to the death penalty. His teammates release him in secret and Ramachandran begins by killing the criminals one by one.

== Cast ==
- Sathyaraj as Inspector Ramachandran
- Pandiarajan as Thirunavukkarasu
- Vijayalakshmi as Divya, Ramachandran's wife
- Ashish Vidyarthi as "Sodukku" Chockalingam
- Srikanth as Chief Minister
- Vennira Aadai Moorthy as Chockalingam's assistant
- Chandrasekhar as Sivarama Gandhi
- Delhi Ganesh as Ramachandran's father
- Livingston as Jeevarathnam / Sathyamoorthy
- Raj Kapoor as Naagaa
- Sriman as Suresh Kumar
- Ponnambalam as Kabaali, Chockalingam's henchman
- Pandu as Rajagopal
- G. M. Kumar as DSP Kumar
- Mahanadi Shankar as Sub-inspector
- Thalapathy Dinesh as Chockalingam's henchman
- Vinayak as Vijay
- Kovai Senthil
- Siva Narayana Murthy
- Deepa Venkat as Deepa
- Abhinayashree as Sandhya, Suresh Kumar's sister
- Mumtaj Pakoda Kadhar as Sub-inspector's wife
- Baby Shathika as Ammukutty
- LIC Narasimhan as Judge
- Lekhasri in a special appearance
- Radhika Chaudhari in a special appearance
- Nagendra Prasad in a special appearance – "Paarappa"

== Production ==
A fight sequence was shot at a newspaper office in Chennai.

== Soundtrack ==
The soundtrack was composed by Deva.

Song	Singer(s)	Lyrics	Duration
"Aathukku Paalam"	Sabesh	Ponniyin Selvan	5:27
"Chinna Chinna"	Sujatha, P. Unnikrishnan	Pa. Vijay	4:45
"Kuththadi Kuththadi (Paarappa)"	Silambarasan	Ponniyin Selvan	5:33
"Maidha Maidha"	Mathangi, Naveen	Ponniyin Selvan	4:58
"Thillaiyaadi"	Tippu, Anuradha Sriram	Pa. Vijay	4:02

== Reception ==
Arkay of Rediff.com wrote: "this film is aimed purely at the B and C categories". Malathi Rangarajan of The Hindu wrote: "Writer-director Raj Kapoor sees to it that Ramachandra's reckless, impulsive ventures only lead to mindless melee and every time you expect some intelligent counters from him, he lets you down very badly". Krishna Chidambaram of Kalki panned the character design of the film's hero and added he cannot appreciate acting since the characters are poorly developed however he found Pandiarajan as the film's only positive. Malini Mannath of Chennai Online wrote "'Ramachandra' is insipid fare that offers nothing new". India Info wrote "Raj Kapoor's direction is not praise worthy, though he has taken all the care to make the film a mass masala film, which may go well with B and C center audience". Sify wrote "The film has a very tame story and climax, but is racy and the end result is not bad". P. Unnikrishnan won the Tamil Nadu State Film Award for Best Male Playback Singer.
