= Ravu =

2013 Indian film by Ajit Ravi Pegasus

- Directed by: Ajit Ravi Pegasus
- Written by: Vinu Abraham; Ajit Ravi Pegasus
- Produced by: Ajit Ravi Pegasus
- Starring: Ajit Ravi Pegasus; Sanam Shetty
- Cinematography: Krishna
- Music by: Vinod Venugopal; Sam Siva
- Production company: Arva Productions
- Release date: 7 August 2013
- Country: India
- Language: Malayalam

Ravu is a 2013 Indian Malayalam-language drama film co-written, produced, and directed by Ajit Ravi Pegasus. The film stars Ajit Ravi Pegasus in the lead role, alongside Sanam Shetty, Nancy Gupta, Vinu Abraham and Sajimon Parayil. The Tamil dubbed version of the film, titled Thottal Vidathu, was released a year later in August 2014.

== Cast ==
- Ajit Ravi Pegasus as Sanjay
- Sanam Shetty as Sanjana
- Nancy Gupta as Nancy
- Vinu Abraham
- Sajimon Parayil as Thambi
- Bibin George
- Krishnachandran
- Vanitha Krishnachandran

== Production ==
Ravu was predominantly shot in Kochi. The film featured models Sanam Shetty and Nancy Gupta in lead roles, with both actresses being offered the characters after working with Ajit Ravi during his beauty pageants.

== Release and reception ==
The film was released in 2013.

The Tamil dubbed version of the film titled Thottal Vidathu was released in August 2014. A critic from Maalai Malar gave the film a negative review. A further critic from iFlicks.com noted Ajit Ravi "could have portrayed his role better" and "needed to work more on the pace of the movie."
