= Dhuruva Natchathiram (1993 film) =

- Poster
- Directed by: L. Raja
- Written by: V. C. Guhanathan
- Produced by: A. M. Varadarajan
- Starring: Arjun; Pallavi
- Cinematography: K. S. Selvaraj
- Edited by: Lancy-Mohan
- Music by: Ilaiyaraaja
- Production company: Premier Productions
- Release date: 15 October 1993
- Country: India
- Language: Tamil

Dhuruva Natchathiram (transl. Pole star) is a 1993 Indian Tamil-language film directed by L. Raja and written by V. C. Guhanathan. The film stars Arjun and Pallavi. It was released on 15 October 1993, after being delayed for three years.

== Cast ==
- Arjun as Suriyadevan
- Pallavi
- Jaishankar
- Jai Ganesh as Ratna Sabapathy
- Goundamani
- Senthil
- Sumithra as Sarada
- Kovai Sarala
- Uma Maheswari
- Kumarimuthu
- Senthamarai
- Typist Gopu

== Production ==
The film completed production and was cleared by the censor board in August 1990, though it remained unreleased for over three years. It is the last film to feature Senthamarai, and was released over a year after his death.

== Soundtrack ==
The music was composed by Ilaiyaraaja.

Track listing
No.	Title	Lyrics	Singer(s)	Length
1.	"Poovendru"	Gangai Amaran	S. P. Balasubrahmanyam
2.	"Chinna Ponney"	Gangai Amaran	Malaysia Vasudevan
3.	"Thaali Enbathinge"	Ilaiyaraaja	Ilaiyaraaja
4.	"Marangal Tharum"	Vaali
5.	"Petthu Pottadhaaro"	Vaali	Ilaiyaraaja
6.	"Poovendru"	Gangai Amaran	S. P. Balasubrahmanyam, K. S. Chithra
7.	"Theysathi Theysamellam"	Vaali	Malaysia Vasudevan, K. S. Chithra, Sai Baba, Sundarrajan

== Release and reception ==
Dhuruva Natchathiram was released on 15 October 1993. K. N. Vijiyan of New Straits Times criticised Raja's direction and Ilaiyaraaja's music, saying the comedy by Goundamani and Senthil was the film's only positive.
