= Sanam Shetty =

Indian actress

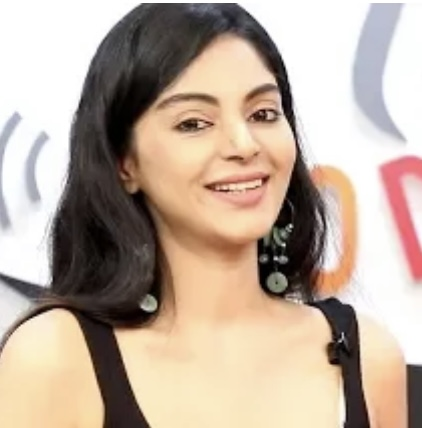
- Shetty in 2020
- Born: Sanam Prasad Shetty; 12 November 1985 (age 40)
- Occupations: Film actress; model
- Years active: 2012–present
- Title: Miss South India (2016)

Sanam Prasad Shetty (born 12 November 1985) is an Indian actress and model, who has worked predominantly in Tamil, Telugu and Malayalam films. In 2020, she was a contestant on the reality series Bigg Boss 4 Tamil.

== Career ==
Born to Tulu father and a Telugu mother in Bangalore, Shetty became interested in fashion shows while studying computer engineering in college. In the mid-2000s, Shetty was initially recruited to model by fashion choreographer Prasad Bidapa and subsequently took part in the Miss Bangalore 2004 competition. In 2010, Sanam, along with Arthi Venkatesh, were described by The New Indian Express as being among "the top models" in Chennai.

Sanam was first cast in the Malayalam film Cinema Company (2012), but ended up making her feature film debut through the Tamil science fiction film, Ambuli (2012), which garnered attention for being the first digital stereoscopic Tamil film. Set in the 1970s, Sanam portrayed a young college girl who becomes caught up in mysterious happenings in a village. The film opened to mixed reviews in February 2012 after a low-profile release at the box office. Sanam continued to receive acting offers and completed a series of low-profile films including the Malayalam project Ravu (2013) by Ajit Ravi Pegasus, Maayai (2013) and Vilaasam (2014), all of which went unnoticed at the box office. A more high-profile film she featured in during the period was the Mammootty-starrer Daivathinte Swantham Cleetus (2014), where she portrayed a supporting role. Sanam was also set to make her debut in Telugu films through veteran director K. Raghavendra Rao's Intinta Anamayya, playing a "NRI rockstar with a very modern outlook". However, despite completing production, the film was never released. She had also signed on to play the lead role in a female-centric film by Aabavanan, where she would play a martial arts expert, though the film was later dropped.

In the mid-2010s, Sanam continued to appear in small budget films in the four South Indian film industries. Her notable Tamil films during the period included the action film Katham Katham (2015), the comedy drama Vellaiya Irukiravan Poi Solla Maatan (2015) and the slasher film Sadhuram 2 (2016). Meanwhile, proposed roles in higher profile film such as Susi Ganesan's Thiruttu Payale 2 (2015) did not materialise. In Telugu films, Sanam portrayed a small role alongside Mahesh Babu in Srimanthudu (2015), and lead roles in the comedy film Singam 123 (2015) and Premikudu (2016). Sanam featured in her first Kannada film, Atharva (2018), appearing alongside debutant Pavan Teja. In 2017, she launched her first film as a producer, Magie, the tale of a girl brought up in Meghalaya. However, the project was later stalled following her fallout with the lead actor Tharshan.

In 2019, Sanam was belatedly crowned as the winner of the Miss South India 2016 beauty pageant, after the organiser opted to dethrone Meera Mithun owing to fraudulent activities. Sanam participated in the reality television show, Bigg Boss Tamil hosted by Kamal Haasan in 2020. She received positive reviews from audiences for her stint on the show, with viewers praising her "straightforward answers and bold questioning" of issues among contestants.

== Personal life ==
Sanam Shetty became engaged to actor Tharshan Thiyagarajah in May 2019, with the wedding planned for June 2019. Tharshan's involvement in the 2019 series of Bigg Boss Tamil later meant that the ceremony was postponed, before the pair cancelled the engagement in late 2019. Sanam later filed a police complaint against Tharshan for his misuse of her funds.

== Filmography ==
Films
Year	Film	Role(s)	Language(s)	Notes
2012	Ambuli	Poongavanam	Tamil	
2012	Cinema Company	Deepika	Malayalam	
2013	Maayai	Jenny	Tamil	
2013	Ravu	Sanjana	Malayalam	
2013	Daivathinte Swantham Cleetus	Anna	Malayalam	
2014	Vilaasam	Abhi	Tamil	
2015	Katham Katham	Madhu	Tamil	
2015	Srimanthudu	Meghana	Telugu	
2015	Singam 123	Chandini	Telugu	
2015	Kalai Vendhan	Malar	Tamil	
2015	Vellaiya Irukiravan Poi Solla Maatan	Aruna	Tamil	
2016	Sawaari	Jeni	Tamil	
2016	Premikudu	Krishna	Telugu	
2016	Thagadu	Indhumathi	Tamil	
2016	Sadhuram 2	Preethi	Tamil	
2017	Ticket	Ria	Tamil	
2018	Atharva	Rachita	Kannada	
2020	Walter	Narmadha Pramod	Tamil	Cameo appearance
2021	Oomai Sennaai	Amudha	Tamil	
2022	Maha	Riya	Tamil	Cameo appearance
TBA	Ethir Vinaiyatru †	TBA	Tamil	Post-production

Television
Year	Title	Role	Channel	Notes
2018	Villa To Village	Contestant	Star Vijay	
2020–2021	Bigg Boss Tamil Season 4	Contestant	Star Vijay	Evicted Day 63
2021	Bigg Boss Season 4 Kondattam	Guest	Star Vijay	Special Show
2021	Kuruthi Kalam	Maha Lakshmi (Maha)	MX Player	
