= Muvva Gopaludu =

- Theatrical release poster
- Directed by: Kodi Ramakrishna
- Screenplay by: Kodi Ramakrishna
- Story by: G. M. Kumar
- Produced by: S. Gopala Reddy
- Starring: Nandamuri Balakrishna; Vijayashanti; Shobana
- Cinematography: K. S. Hari
- Edited by: K. Satyam
- Music by: K. V. Mahadevan
- Production company: Bhargav Art Productions
- Release date: 19 May 1987
- Running time: 138 minutes
- Country: India
- Language: Telugu

Muvva Gopaludu is a 1987 Indian Telugu-language romantic drama film co-written and directed by Kodi Ramakrishna. The film stars Nandamuri Balakrishna, Vijayashanti and Shobana, with music composed by K. V. Mahadevan. It is a remake of the Tamil film Aruvadai Naal (1986), which was co-written by G. M. Kumar. The film was released on 19 May 1987.

== Plot ==
The film is set in a village where Gopi, a wealthy and spirited young man, is oppressed by his tyrannical brother-in-law, Basava Raju. Despite this, his sister, Nagalakshmi, shows him warmth and support. Meanwhile, Nirmala, a medical student raised by a Christian missionary, is appointed by the government to work in Gopi’s village. Although Nirmala initially plans to become a nun, she agrees to serve in the village at the request of a Mother Superior. Upon arrival, she meets Father Lawrence, a kind-hearted priest admired by the villagers.

Gopi and Nirmala initially clash but soon develop a close bond. When Gopi attempts suicide due to Basava Raju's constant humiliations, Nirmala saves him, and he confesses his love for her. Torn between her religious calling and her feelings for Gopi, Nirmala seeks advice from Father Lawrence, who assures her that love is not a sin and encourages her to consider marrying Gopi. Basava Raju, aware of the growing relationship, pretends to support it but secretly plots to marry Gopi to his daughter, Krishnaveni, in order to secure Gopi's wealth.

Basava Raju arranges Krishnaveni’s puberty ceremony and tricks Gopi into unknowingly placing a wedding chain (Mangalasutram) around her neck, thus declaring them married. When Nirmala returns to the village and learns of the situation, she decides to leave, but the villagers convince her to stay. Devastated, Gopi becomes an alcoholic. Seeing his distress, Krishnaveni exposes Basava Raju’s deceit with the help of Father Lawrence. The village Panchayat annuls Gopi and Krishnaveni's marriage, allowing Gopi and Nirmala to wed.

As preparations for the wedding begin, Basava Raju disrupts the ceremony and kills Father Lawrence. When he attempts to attack Nirmala, she seeks refuge in the church, shocking everyone. Enraged, Gopi kills Basava Raju with Nagalakshmi’s encouragement and is sentenced to seven years in prison. Upon his release, Gopi is welcomed back by Krishnaveni, while Nirmala, now a nun, reunites them, bringing the story to a happy conclusion.

== Cast ==
- Nandamuri Balakrishna as Muvva Gopala Krishna Prasad / Gopi
- Vijayashanti as Nirmala
- Shobhana as Krishnaveni
- Rao Gopal Rao as Basava Raju
- Gollapudi Maruti Rao as Father Lawrence
- Chidatala Appa Rao as Villager
- K.K. Sarma as Villager
- Telephone Satyanarayana as President
- Jayachitra as Nagalakshmi
- Satyavathi as Jalaga Lakshamma
- Anitha as Nun
- Chilaka Radha as Seetalu
- Kalpana Rai as Nukalu
- Y. Vijaya as Veeramma
- Brahmaji
- Usilaimani

== Music ==
The music was composed by K. V. Mahadevan. Lyrics were written by C. Narayana Reddy.

Song title	Singers	length
"Muvva Gopaludu"	S. P. Balasubrahmanyam	5:09
"Andhagada"	S. P. Balasubrahmanyam, P. Susheela	4:27
"Muthyala Chemma Chekkalu"	S. P. Balasubrahmanyam, P. Susheela	4:23
"Ey Gumma"	S. P. Balasubrahmanyam, P. Susheela	4:17
"Edalona Ragile"	S. P. Balasubrahmanyam, P. Susheela	4:12
"Vegu Chukka"	S. P. Balasubrahmanyam, P. Susheela	4:09

== Accolades ==
- Nandi Award for Second Best Story Writer – G. M. Kumar
- Balakrishna won Cinema Express award for Best actor (1987)
