= Sathyajith (Tamil actor) =

Indian actor

- Occupation: Actor
- Years active: 1977–present
- Children: 2

Shabbir Ahmed, better known by his stage name Sathyajith, is an Indian actor known for his work in Tamil and Hindi-language films and television serials. He is best known for his career debut 16 Vayathinile (1977).

== Career ==
Shabbir Ahmed studied at the Madras Film Institute in 1976. While studying in his second year, he shot for the film Naam Pirandha Mann (1977). Sri Amman Creations then offered him an audition, which helped him land the role of the doctor in 16 Vayathinile (1977), which ended up releasing first. He was offered the role when still photographer Lakshmi Kanthan appeared outside his room one night and asked if he would be interested. He subsequently moved to Chennai from his hometown Bangalore for the film, and portrayed the role of a well-respectable, prosperous doctor who romantically leads Sridevi's character of Mayil on, before abandoning her. He shot for the film for ten days in Mysore, and was renamed Sathyajith during post-production by Ilaiyaraaja. Although he was not fluent in Tamil, he was insistent that he would dub for his role. While the film's lead actors Kamal Haasan and Sridevi, and antagonist Rajinikanth achieved stardom and pan-Indian recognition, Sathyajith was less successful.

Sathyajith has since acted in over forty films including Ezhavathu Manithan (1982), the Hindi film Ghayal (1990) and an unreleased film starring Mithun Chakraborty apart from acting in twenty television serials. In Hey Ram (2000), he shared screen space with Rani Mukerji who helped him with his Bengali dialogues.

In 2022, Sathyajith resurfaced when he was announced as the director and producer of the unreleased Kannada film Bullet starring Dharma Keerthiraj. He was also expected to act in the film.

== Personal life ==
Sathyajith has a son and a daughter.

== Partial filmography ==
=== Actor ===
==== Films ====
- 16 Vayathinile (1977)
- Naam Pirandha Mann (1977)
- Ezhavathu Manithan (1982)
- Kuppathu Ponnu (1982)
- Jothi (1983)
- Aruvadai Naal (1986)
- Dhoorathu Pachai (1987)
- Michael Raj (1987)
- Anand (1987)
- Pick Pocket (1989)
- Ghayal (1990)
- Uruvam (1991)
- Irumbu Pookkal (1991)
- Hey Ram (2000)
- Kaadhal Kondein (2003)
- White Rainbow (2005)
- Thirudiya Idhayathai (2005)
- Rasikkum Seemane (2010)
- Haridas (2013)
- Rangoon (2017)
- Raatchasi (2019)

==== Television ====
- Ahalya (Sun TV)
- Jayam as Chakkaravarthy (Jaya TV)
- Athipookkal (Sun TV)
- Vaazhve Dhayam (DD Podhigai)

=== Dubbing artist ===
- Nawab Khan - Bose
- Rahul Dev - Aadhavan
