= Love Ke Chakkar Mein =

- Directed by: B. H. Tharun Kumar
- Screenplay by: Rajeev Kaul; Praful Parekh
- Story by: Rajeev Kaul; Praful Parekh; Dialogue: Raghuvir Shekhawat
- Produced by: Dev Goradia
- Starring: Rishi Kapoor; Akshat Bhatia; Namitha; Satish Shah; Shoma Anand
- Cinematography: Neelaabh Kaul
- Music by: Anand Raaj Anand; Daboo Malik; Nikhil; Nikhil Vinay
- Production company: Manash Productions
- Release date: 2 June 2006 (India)
- Country: India
- Language: Hindi

Love Ke Chakkar Mein is a 2006 Hindi language comedy film written by Rajeev Kaul and Praful Parekh, and directed by B. H. Tharun Kumar. The film stars Rishi Kapoor, Akshat Bhatia, Satish Shah, and Shoma Anand, and marks the debut of Akshat Bhatia. The film was the second movie for director B.H. Tharunkumar. He made Nayee Padosan in 2003. The film was also a Bollywood debut for actress Namitha who appeared only in this Bollywood movie.

== Background ==
When Parmita Katkar, Miss India Asia Pacific 2003, signed with the production, it was referred to as a hot project. And as soon as December 2004, actor Rishi Kapoor reported that he had completed his part in the film.

== Plot ==
Unemployed Vicky (Akshat Bhatia) meets Neha (Namita) on the internet, and when they meet in person, they fall in love and wish to get married. Neha's father, Vishal (Satish Shah), approves of the union, but in order for him to bless the marriage, he requires Vicky to obtain employment within 7 days. As the deadline approaches, Vicky finally meets the employer, Armaan Kochar (Rishi Kapoor). Armann agrees to hire Vicky, but only upon the condition that he lets Neha and he spend a night together. Desperate, Vicky agrees... but instead of Neha, Vicky has hired a prostitute to impersonate her. Once Vicky is employed, Neha's father adds another condition: Vicky must find a suitable apartment or the marriage will not go forward. Vicky approaches Armann for help, and Armann sets him up in an apartment but insists on another night with "Neha" as compensation. But before Vicky can make the arrangements with the prostitute, Armann sees the girl performing at a nightclub and learns that her name is Bijlee (Parmita Katkar) and that she was hired by Vicky and the reason why. Angry, Armann fires Vicky and evicts him. Armann is subsequently kidnapped and held for ransom. Having witnessed the confrontation between the two, Armann's wife, Kaajal (Shoma Anand), contacts the police and accuses Vicky of the crime.

== Cast ==
- Rishi Kapoor as Armaan Kochar
- Sikandar Kharbanda
- Akshat Bhatia as Vicky
- Satish Shah as Vishal Batra
- Shoma Anand as Kaajal A. Kochar
- Namitha as Neha V. Batra
- Parmita Katkar as Bijlee
- Shashi Kiran as Dr. Subhash

== Music ==
Love Ke Chakkar Mein

Soundtrack album by Anand Raaj Anand Nikhil–Vinay Daboo Malik
- Released: 29 April 2006
- Genre: Feature film soundtrack
- Label: T-Series

1. Ek Kamre Mein Hum Tum - Sunidhi Chauhan
2. Ek Kamre Mein Hum Tum (Duet) - Sunidhi Chauhan, Sonu Nigam
3. Ek Pal Mein Pyar - Sunidhi Chauhan, Sonu Nigam
4. Hum The Aasma Pe - Shaan
5. Itna Bata Do Hame Kya - Sadhana Sargam, Shaan
6. Love Ke Chakkar Mein - Farhad Bhiwandiwala
7. Suno Na Dil Kya Kehta Hai - Shaan, Alka Yagnik

== Reception ==
IndiaGlitz makes note that small budget films with "relatively" unknown actors occasionally do well due to promotion and word-of-mouth. In noting a dry spell for director B. H. Tharun Kumar, "may just about make it happen again at the box office." Times of India noted the film as one of the many Summer comedies "hoping to tickle their way to box-office success".
