= Thee (2009 film) =

- Poster
- Directed by: G. Kicha
- Screenplay by: G. Kicha
- Story by: Posani Krishna Murali
- Produced by: Shahul Hameed; G. Kicha
- Starring: Sundar C Namitha; Ramya Raj
- Cinematography: K. Bhoopathy
- Edited by: Saleem
- Music by: Srikanth Deva
- Production company: Shree Movie Makers
- Distributed by: Sun Pictures
- Release date: 27 February 2009
- Country: India
- Language: Tamil

Thee (transl. Fire) is a 2009 Indian Tamil-language political action film co-written, co-produced, and directed by G. Kicha. The film stars Sundar C, Namitha and Ramya Raj while Vivek, G. M. Kumar, Manoj K. Jayan, and Sayaji Shinde play supporting roles. The music was composed by Srikanth Deva, and the editing was done by Saeem. The film was released on 27 February 2009. The film was a remake of the Telugu film Operation Duryodhana.

== Plot ==
The story begins with Sarathy (Sundar C), a tough but honest cop. Given his straightforward nature, he is the thorn in the flesh for many antisocial elements and politicians. Due to this, he keeps getting transferred from time to time but has no qualms about it, since he is happily married to Ganga (Ramya Raj). However, Sarathy's life takes a turn when he arrests a corrupt MLA J.P. (G. M. Kumar) and his men, which leads J.P. to quit the field. J.P. vows revenge, so he kills Ganga and their two children. He also frames Sarathy in a case. Ganga escapes, and Sarathy admits her in a hospital in serious condition. This enrages Sarathy so much that he decides to take a different route. He becomes Saami, and with the help of a top hot actress Ruchi Devi (Namitha), he obtains a political ticket and successfully becomes an MLA. His wife gives birth to a child and dies in the hospital. From then on, he begins his corrupt acts in such a way that the entire society begins to loathe the police force. In no time, the police are vexed and decide to go on an indefinite strike. The entire system comes to a halt and things begin to get messy. Saami then strikes hard at J.P., and what happens from there forms the rest of the story.

== Cast ==
- Sundar C as ACP Sarathy/MLA Saami
- Namitha as Ruchi Devi
- Ramya Raj as Ganga
- Vivek as Rajesh
- G. M. Kumar as J.P.
- Manoj K. Jayan as ACP Jayan
- Sayaji Shinde as Rajapandiyan
- Thalaivasal Vijay as Rathnam
- Ponnambalam as Saleem
- Raj Kapoor as SI Devaraj
- Gowtham Sundararajan
- Madhan Bob as A Man who never casts vote
- Vaiyapuri as Rajapandiyan's sidekick

== Production ==
The scene where Sundar's character walks semi nude on a street in Chennai was filmed surreptitiously, hence surprising onlookers who did not know there was a film shooting.

== Soundtrack ==
Soundtrack was composed by Srikanth Deva.

| Song | Singers | Lyrics |
|---|---|---|
| "Valliyamma Valliyamma" | Deva | Gana Pazhani |
| "Kaalai Nera" | Karthik | Yugabharathi |
| "Nee Illamal" | Sadhana Sargam, Madhu Balakrishnan | Yugabharathi |
| "Raghava Ranaiya" | Roshini | Yugabharathi |
| "Theepporiyil" | Krish | Piraisoodan |

== Reception ==
Rediff wrote "By the time Thee comes to the end of (it's an almost 3-hour long torture session), you're ready to tear your hair out at Namitha's blink-and-miss appearance, Sundar C's R Parthiban copy-act, G Kitcha's horrible screenplay and Srikanth Deva's ear-drum piercing kuthu songs". The Times of India wrote "Director Kitcha certainly takes a larger canvas to revisit a story seen many times. However, he wins brownie points for releasing such a film ahead of the elections".
