= Pallavi (actress) =

Indian actress

Pallavi is an Indian actress in Tamil and Kannada films from 1985 to 1993 and continued to pursue her career as a supporting actor.

She has acted alongside various lead actors including Rajinikanth, Kamal Haasan, Ambareesh, Vijayakanth, Prabhu, Karthik, Murali, S. Ve. Shekher, Mohan, Arjun, Mukesh, Suresh Gopi, Pandiarajan and Shankar Nag. She was first introduced in Telugu by A. Kodandarami Reddy in the film, Illalu Priyuralu in 1984. Afterwards, she was introduced in Kannada by T.S.Nagabharana in the film, Nethra Pallavi in 1985 and then she was introduced in Tamil by actor Sivaji Ganesan in his home production, Aruvadai Naal starring his son, Prabhu in 1986.

== Filmography ==
Year	Film	Role	Language
1984	Illalu Priyuralu		Telugu
1985	Nethra Pallavi		Kannada
1985	Devarelliddane		Kannada
1985	Balondu Uyyale		Kannada
1985	Rendu Rella Aaru		Telugu
1985	Devara Mane		Kannada
1986	Thayiye Nanna Devaru		Kannada
1986	Marjala		Kannada
1986	Beegara Pandya		Kannada
1986	Aruvadai Naal	Nirmala	Tamil
1986	Dharma Devathai	Rekha	Tamil
1987	Thaye Neeye Thunai	Seetha	Tamil
1987	Thangachi	Radha	Tamil
1987	Velaikaran	Nisha	Tamil
1987	Kathai Kathaiyam Karanamam		Tamil
1988	Sahadevan Mahadevan	Geetha	Tamil
1988	Urimai Geetham	Indhu	Tamil
1988	Dhayam Onnu		Tamil
1988	Paarthal Pasu	Rathna	Tamil
1988	Paimara Kappal		Tamil
1988	En Thamizh En Makkal		Tamil
1988	Soora Samhaaram	Divya	Tamil
1988	Oorai Therinjukithen	Geetha	Tamil
1989	Thangamani Rangamani	Bhagyalakshmi	Tamil
1989	Enga Veettu Deivam		Tamil
1989	Yogam Raja Yogam		Tamil
1989	Athaimadi Methaiadi	Narthana	Tamil
1989	Vizhiyora Kavidhaigal		Tamil
1989	Mananthal Mahadevan		Tamil
1989	Anbu Kattalai	Sudha	Tamil
1990	Sirayil Sila Raangangal		Tamil
1990	Vedikkai En Vadikkai	Urvasi	Tamil
1990	Enakkoru Neethi		Tamil
1990	Vetri Malai		Tamil
1990	Erikarai Poonkatre		Tamil
1990	Superstar		Malayalam
1991	Nattuvishesham		Malayalam
1991	Uruvam	Raasi	Tamil
1991	Irumbu Pookal	Chitra	Tamil
1992	Mahaan		Malayalam
1992	Suyamariyadhai	Rekha	Tamil
1992	Purushan Enakku Arasan		Tamil
1993	Vijaya Kranthi		Kannada
1993	Dhuruva Natchathiram		Tamil
1993	I Love India		Tamil
1993	Uzhaippali	Cameo in song "Oru Maina"	Tamil
1993	Yaadhavam		Malayalam
1993	Pudhiya Mugam	Cameo in song "Sambo Sambo"	Tamil
1994	Khaidi No. 1		Telugu
1996	Mr. Bechara		Hindi
1997	Arasiyal	Vasanthi	Tamil
1997	Arunachalam		Tamil
1998	Golmaal	Aishwarya's sister-in-law	Tamil
1998	Natpukkaga	Perusu's mistress	Tamil
2000	Manu Needhi		Tamil
2000	Papa The Great		Hindi
2001	Aunty Thumba Thunti		Kannada
2002	Unnai Ninaithu	Nirmala's mother	Tamil
2002	Marma		Kannada
2002	Maaran	Guest appearance	Tamil
2004	Joke Falls	Kamala	Kannada
2004	Joot		Kannada
2004	Dhanya		Kannada
2004	Prana		Kannada
2004	Baa Baaro Rasika		Kannada
2005	Magic Ajji		Kannada
2005	Kalavarkey		Malayalam
2005	Mithayi Mane		Kannada
2006	Mukhamukhi		Kannada
2006	Kusthi		Tamil
2008	Vasool		Tamil
2009	Vaidehi		Tamil
2009	Pinchu Manasu		Tamil

== Television ==
Year	Serial	Role	Channel
1998-1999	Akshaya	Sumathi	Sun TV
1998-2001	Ganga Yamuna Saraswathi	Saraswathi	Raj TV
2000-2001	Anandha Bhavan	Lakshmi	Sun TV
2001-2002	Soolam		Sun TV
2002-2003	Agal Vilakkugal		Sun TV
2004-2007	My Dear Bhootham	Ganagavalli	Sun TV
2004-2006	Manaivi	Girija	Sun TV
2005-2006	Kettimelam		Jaya TV
2007-2008	Thirumagal		Kalaignar TV
