= Raj Kapoor (Tamil director) =

Indian film director and actor

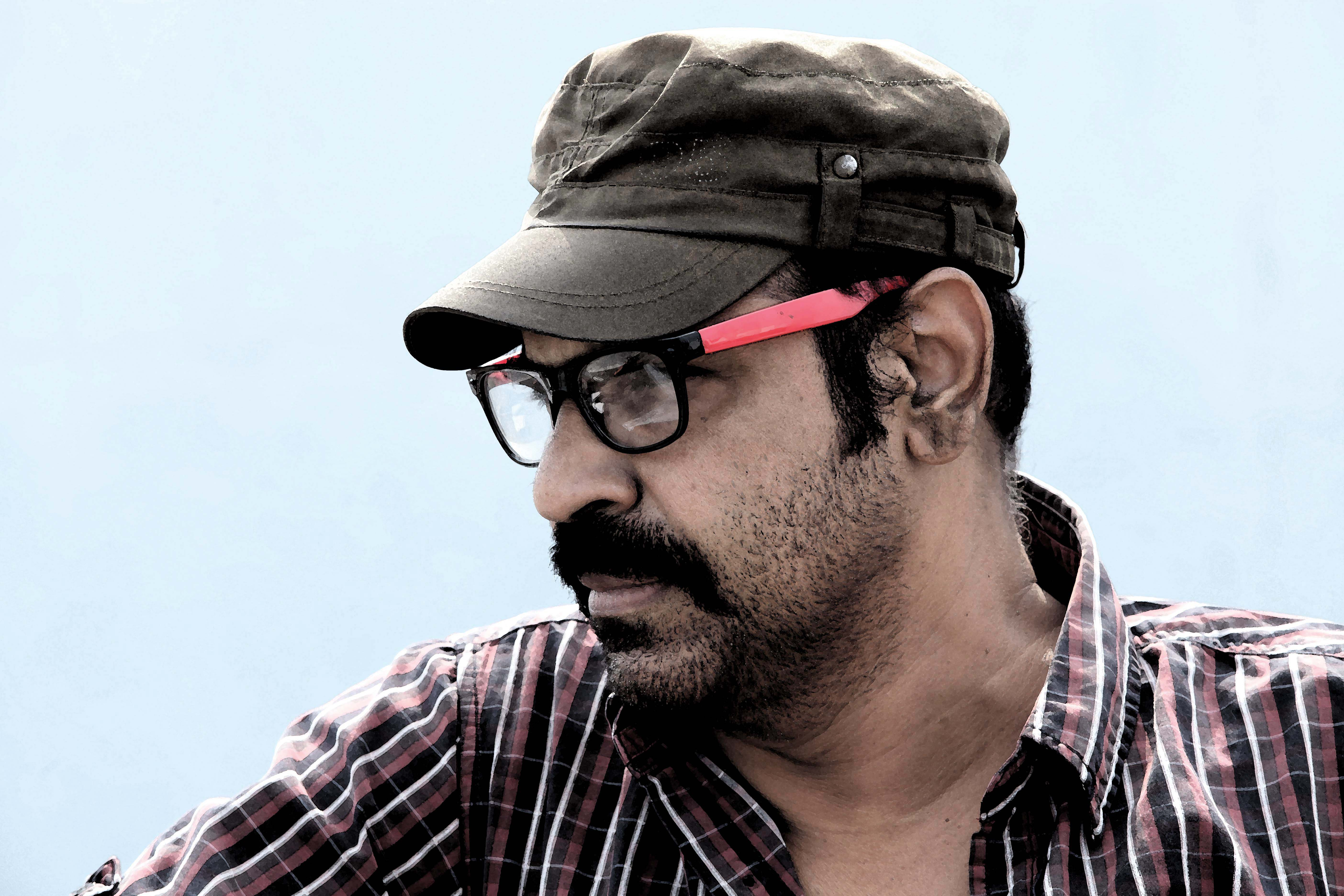
- Born: Shahul Mohammed; 15 August 1958 (age 68); Kombai, Theni, Tamil Nadu
- Occupations: Film director, Actor
- Years active: 1983–present
- Spouse: Sajeela
- Children: 3

Shahul Mohammed (born 15 August 1958), known professionally as Raj Kapoor, is an Indian film director and actor, who has worked predominantly in Tamil cinema. He has also appeared as a supporting actor in Telugu, Malayalam and Kannada films.

== Career ==
Raj Kapoor started his cinema career as an assistant director to Film director C. V. Sridhar one of the legends of golden period of Tamil cinema. Later became an independent film director for Thalattu Ketkuthamma (1991). He is known for films like Prabhu-Khushbu’s Uthama Raasa (1993) and Ajith Kumar-Simran’s Aval Varuvala (1998). He went on to direct other films like Ajith-Meena's Anantha Poongatre (1999), Arjun-Rambha's Sudhandhiram (2000) and Sathyaraj's Vambu Sandai (2008).

After making his debut as an actor in Thalaimurai (1998), Raj Kapoor announced his intentions of continuing to act in films ahead of prioritizing directorial work.

During the early 2000s, he worked on the production of a big-budget family drama titled Enna Vilai Azhagae with Prashanth and Amisha Patel starring. Despite completing most of the film and having schedules abroad in Paris, the film was shelved and remains unreleased.

He took to directing television serials, the most famous being Sundar C’s Nandini, that was aired on Sun TV. He later directed a few episodes Rasaathi and Jothi.

== Personal life ==
His son Sharook Kapoor began assisting in Raj Kapoor's film direction works. On February 17, 2020 Sharook Kapoor who was in Mecca with his mother for pilgrimage died.

== Filmography ==
=== Director ===
Films

Year	Film	Notes
1991	Thalattu Ketkuthamma	
1992	Chinna Pasanga Naanga	
1993	Uthama Raasa	
1993	Chinna Jameen	
1994	Seeman	
1994	Sathyavan	
1997	Vallal	
1998	Aval Varuvala	
1998	Kalyana Galatta	
1999	Anantha Poongatre	
2000	Sudhandhiram	
2002	Samasthanam	
2003	Ramachandra	
2006	Kusthi	
2008	Vambu Sandai	

Serials

Year	Serial	Language	Notes
2017 – 2018	Nandini	Tamil; Kannada	Season 1
2019	Rasaathi	Tamil	First 28 Episodes
2021	Jothi	Tamil	Complete Series

=== Actor ===
Films

- All films are in Tamil, unless otherwise noted.

Year	Film	Role	Notes
1983	Oru Odai Nadhiyagirathu	Watchman	Uncredited role
1986	Aruvadai Naal	Police inspector	Uncredited role
1989	Pick Pocket	Police inspector	Uncredited role
1998	Thalaimurai	Muthu's father	
1999	Anantha Poongatre	Malavika's uncle	
1999	Bobbili Vamsham	Raghava Rayudu's father	Telugu film
1999	Taj Mahal	Machakanni's Brother	
2000	Eazhaiyin Sirippil	Police Sub-Inspector	
2000	Sudhandhiram	One Hand Man	
2001	Vaanchinathan	Inspector Raveendran	
2001	Aandan Adimai		
2002	Samasthanam	Eswaramoorthy	
2002	Kadhal Virus	Director	
2003	Ramachandra	Naga	
2003	Whistle	Baji	
2003	Thennavan	Politician	
2003	Winner	Vaira Kannan	
2003	Kadhal Kirukkan	Ravi Varma	
2004	Adi Thadi	Tirupati's Assistant	
2004	Madhurey	Kanthuvatti	
2004	Gajendra	Rana's henchman	
2004	Giri	Paramasivam	
2004	Maha Nadigan	Rajan	
2004	Jaisurya	Politician	
2005	Ayya	Police inspector	
2005	Kannadi Pookal	Police inspector	
2005	Thambi	Police inspector	
2005	6'2	Police inspector	
2005	Padhavi Paduthum Paadu	Raja	
2005	Aanai	Trafficker	
2005	Aaru	Bhoominathan	
2006	Aathi	Corrupt Minister	
2006	Madrasi	Ravi Bhai	
2006	Thuruppugulan	Sub-Inspector Aarumugham	Malayalam film
2006	Kusthi	Rowdy	
2006	Dharmapuri	Silandhi Karuppu	
2007	Agaram	Police Deputy Superintendent	
2007	Naan Avanillai	Chief Investigation Officer	
2007	Ninaithu Ninaithu Parthen	Varadharajan	
2007	Nam Naadu	Local Rowdy	
2007	Vel	Vel's Uncle	
2008	Pazhani	Vaikundan	
2008	Indiralohathil Na Azhagappan	Emaloga Kutravali	
2008	Thotta	Shanmugham's father	
2008	Sandai	Kamaraj's cousin	
2008	Pandi	Kothalam	
2008	Dhanam	Inspector Kapoor	
2008	Buddhivantha	Investigation Officer	Kannada film
2009	Villu	Oor Thalaivar	
2009	Thee		
2009	Mayandi Kudumbathar	Paraman's uncle	
2009	Maasilamani	Kanthuvatti	
2009	Ainthaam Padai	Rajadurai	
2010	Goripalayam		
2010	Guru Sishyan	Guru Moorthy's Assistant	
2010	Kanagavel Kaaka	Mannadi Narayanan	
2010	Vaadaa	Politician	
2011	Bhavani	Lawyer	
2011	Muthukku Muthaaga	Thavasi's relative	
2011	Ponnar Shankar	King's Minister	
2011	Nooravathu Naal	Director	
2012	Akilan	CBI Officer	
2012	Kondaan Koduthaan		
2012	Oru Nadigaiyin Vaakkumoolam	Director	
2012	Pandi Oliperukki Nilayam	Pandi's father	
2012	Puthumugangal Thevai	Producer	
2013	Alex Pandian	Police Commissioner	
2013	Haridas	P.T. Coach	
2013	Oruvar Meethu Iruvar Sainthu	Savita's guardian	
2013	Maayai		
2014	Uyirukku Uyiraga	Managing director	
2014	Sooran		
2014	Aranmanai	Driver	
2014	Vilaasam		
2015	Aambala	Saravanan's uncle	
2015	Eli	Old Time Police	
2015	Pallikoodam Pogamale	Kayalvizhi's Father	
2016	Aranmanai 2	Muthu (Driver)	
2016	Saagasam	Politician	
2016	Jennifer Karuppaiya		
2016	Adra Machan Visilu		
2016	Wagah	Vasu's father	
2016	Thagadu	King's Minister	
2016	Aasi	Durga's father	
2016	Kodi	Finance Minister	
2018	Kilambitangayaa Kilambitangayaa		
2018	Kannakkol	Police officer	
2019	Vantha Rajavathaan Varuven	Politician	
2021	Raajavamsam	Shanmugam	
2022	Laththi	Politician	
2023	Meippada Sei		
2023	Azhagiya Kanne		
2023	Moothakudi		
2024	Uyir Thamizhukku		
2025	Madha Gaja Raja	Inspector Shankar	
2025	Nizharkudai		
2026	Mookuthi Amman 2	DSP	

Serials

Year	Serial	Role	Network	Notes
2004	My Dear Bootham	Himself	Sun TV	Special appearance
2019–2020	Run	Selvanayagam	Sun TV	
2021	Thalattu		Sun TV	Special appearance
2021–2022	Enga Veetu Meenakshi	Chairman Meiyappan	Colors Tamil	
2022–2024	Amudhavum Annalakshmiyum	Manickam	Zee Tamil	
2022	Roja	Victor	Sun TV	
2026–present	Thai Maaman	Manjamalai	Star Vijay	
