= Namitha I Love You =

- Directed by: M. Jayasimha Reddy
- Written by: M. Jayasimha Reddy
- Produced by: M. Raviteja Reddy
- Starring: Namitha
- Cinematography: P Diwakar
- Edited by: K R Swamy
- Music by: M. Jayasimha Reddy
- Production company: Jayasimha Pictures
- Release date: 10 June 2011
- Country: India
- Language: Kannada

Namitha I Love You is a 2011 Kannada-language comedy drama written and directed by M. Jayasimha Reddy and starring Namitha in the lead role.

== Cast ==
- Namitha
- Pruthviraj
- Gollahalli Shivaprasad
- Akshata Shetty
- Shobhina
- Anu
- Tennis Krishna

== Soundtrack ==
No.	Title	Length

== Release and reception ==
The film was released on 10 June 2011.

B S Srivani from Deccan Herald wrote "At the future of contemporary college life, education relegated to the trash bin and the glorification of lust above all natural emotions. Families and sane people are advised to skip this insult to cinema".
