= Atharva (2018 film) =

2018 film directed by Arun

- Film poster
- Directed by: Arun
- Written by: Arun
- Produced by: Vinay Kumar
- Starring: Pavan Teja; Sanam Shetty; Yash Shetty
- Release date: 13 July 2018
- Country: India
- Language: Kannada

Atharva is a 2018 Indian Kannada-language action drama film written and directed by Arun. The film stars Pavan Teja and Sanam Shetty in the lead roles. It was released on 13 July 2018.

== Cast ==
- Pavan Teja as Nanda
- Sanam Shetty as Rachita
- Yashwanth Shetty as Maari Mahadeva
- Rangayana Raghu
- Tara

== Production ==
Director Arun had written the story in 2013 and approached producer Vinay Kumar and co-producer Rakshay to support the project. Pavan Teja, a nephew of an actor Arjun Sarja, was cast in the lead role to make his acting debut. Prior to working on the film, he had acted in theatre shows, and readied himself to play three different avatars in the film by losing 15 kilograms. Sanam Shetty, who had appeared in other regional South Indian films, made her first appearance in a Kannada-language project through Atharva. The film was shot for 65 days starting in October 2017 in areas including Bengaluru, Mangaluru, Chickmagaluru, Mandya, and Kanakapura.

== Release and reception ==
The film released on 13 July 2018. A critic from The Times of India noted, "Arun has used the tried-and-tested, love-and-action formula without strong content", giving the film a mixed review. A reviewer from Chitratara.com noted "for the arrival of new hero Pawan Teja and some delectable scenes, this film is worth watching".
