= Namitha =

Indian actress (born 1981)

Namitha Vankawala
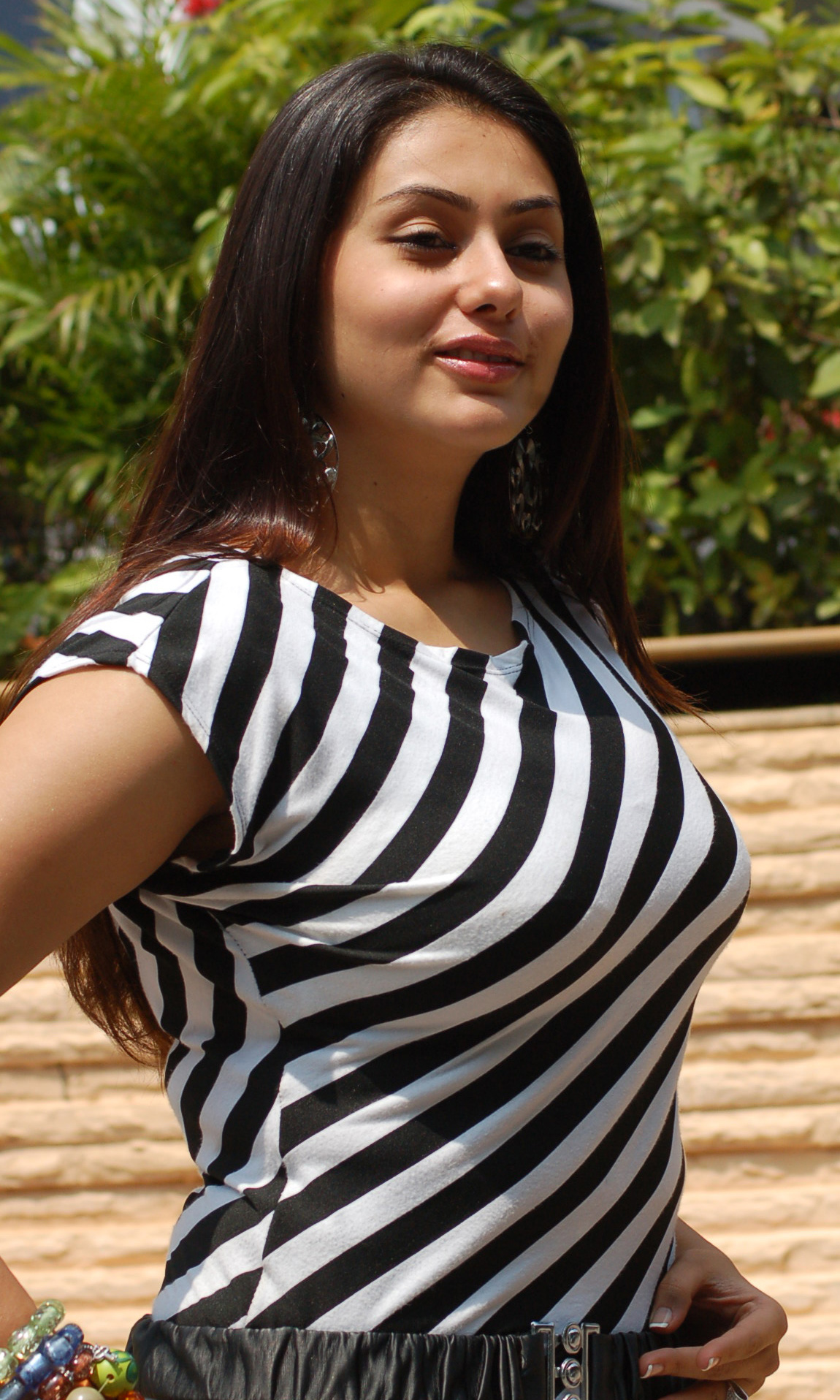
- Namitha in 2007
- Born: Namitha Mukesh Vankawala; 10 May 1981 (age 45); Surat, Gujarat, India
- Occupations: Actress; model; politician
- Years active: 2001 – 2021
- Political party: Bharatiya Janata Party
- Spouse: Veerendra Chowdary (m. 2017)
- Children: 2
- Website: www.zero.online

Namitha Vankawala (born 10 May 1981) is a state executive member of the Bhartiya Janata Party (BJP) in Tamil Nadu. She started her career initially as an actress and model who predominantly worked in Tamil and Telugu cinema along with a few films in Kannada and Malayalam.

== Career ==
Starting her career as a beauty pageant contestant, Namitha was crowned Miss Surat in 1998 at the age of 17. She went on to participate in the 2001 Miss India pageant and ended up as the third runner-up, while Celina Jaitley was crowned Miss India. The publicity she garnered during the competition prompted her to move to Mumbai and subsequently she did a number of TV commercials for well known brands early in her career. Unable to make a breakthrough into the Hindi film industry, she enrolled in an English Literature course and then considered returning to Surat but chose to later accept an invitation to audition for a Telugu film.

After being selected, she made her acting debut in Sreenu Vaitla's coming-of-age romantic film, Sontham (2002). Her next film, Saran's big budget action film Gemeni (2002) opposite Venkatesh, garnered her further attention and her portrayal of a Marwardi girl won critical acclaim. She had also briefly adopted the stage name "Bhairavi" for the film, but later reverted to her original name.

In the mid-2000s, she quickly became popular in Tamil language films with her mature look and tall frame, prompting film makers to cast her opposite ageing actors such as Vijayakanth, Sathyaraj, Arjun, Parthiban, Sundar C and Sarathkumar.

Likewise, she was regularly cast in comedy films with senior actors too, making appearances in Siddique's Engal Anna (2004) and six of Sakthi Chidambaram's comedy dramas. She appeared in a series of commercial action films opposite such actors, including roles in Aai (2005), Chanakya (2005) and Aanai (2005). During the period, she appeared in her first Hindi film Love Ke Chakkar Mein, worked on a Kannda film titled Namitha I Love You and shot for an English film, Maya, which was later released in 2008 as Kamasutra Nights. In 2007, she had the opportunity to work with two leading actors from Tamil cinema, respectively appearing with Vijay in the A. R. Rahman-musical Azhagiya Tamil Magan (2007) and Ajith Kumar in Vishnuvardhan's gangster film Billa (2007). By the end of the period, Namitha had developed a "cult following" in Tamil Nadu as a result of her glamorous appearances in films, with the media regularly looking to feature her in reports and Behindwoods.com labelled her "omnipotent and omnipresent".

However, by the turn of the decade, Namitha's popularity began to decline after several of her films failed to perform well and the South Indian film industry moved away from casting women in outright glamorous roles, a character that Namitha had become famed for performing. Film makers were also reluctant to cast Namitha opposite young male actors, as the older generation began to stop appearing in leading roles. She was relegated to increasingly smaller roles and guest appearances, while the big-budget horror film, Jaganmohini (2009), where she played the title role performed poorly at the box office. She briefly prioritized her work in Kannada films in the early 2010s, while several of her films endured production delays including Ilamai Oonjal (2016). After several years without any film releases, she announced plans of making a comeback in 2016.

In 2017, Namitha appeared on the Tamil reality television show, Bigg Boss hosted by Kamal Haasan. During her stint in the show, she was widely criticised for her harsh treatment of actress Oviya. She also seen in the Horror movies such as Pottu (2019) and Miya (2020).

In 2021, she make an appearance in TV serial Pudhu Pudhu Arthangal and then on the comedy show Kanni Theevu Ullasa Ulagam 2.0 entertain the audience as a special guest.

== In the media ==
At the height of her success in 2008, Namitha's devotee built her a temple near Coimbatore, Tamil Nadu. She became the second actress after Khushbu in the state to be immortalised in such a fashion by her fan following. In October 2010, there was an attempt to kidnap her by a fan at Trichy in Tamil Nadu. She has been an advocate of safe driving and in June 2012, she and Tamil actor Bharat promoted awareness of safe driving.

== Politics ==
Namitha joined AIADMK on 24 April 2016 in the presence of party general secretary and Tamil Nadu chief minister J Jayalalithaa in Trichy. In 2019, Namitha along with actor Radha Ravi joined the Bharatiya Janata Party in the presence of party's national president J. P. Nadda in Chennai. In July 2020, after 8 months of joining the BJP, Namitha was appointed as one of the state executive member of the BJP in Tamil Nadu.

== Personal life ==
Namitha married businessman Veerendra Chowdary in Tirupathi in November 2017. The couple announced their pregnancy via Namitha's Instagram on her 41st birthday. She delivered twin sons in August 2022.

== Filmography ==
Key
†	Denotes films that have not yet been released

Year	Title	Role(s)	Language(s)	Notes	Ref.
2002	Sontham	Nandu	Telugu	Debut film	
2002	Gemeni	Manisha Natwarlal	Telugu	credited as Bhairavi	
2003	Oka Raju Oka Rani	Preethi	Telugu		
2003	Oka Radha Iddaru Krishnula Pelli	Sasirekha	Telugu		
2004	Engal Anna	Gowri	Tamil	Tamil Debut	
2004	Aithe Enti	Anjali Sharma	Telugu		
2004	Maha Nadigan	Aishwarya	Tamil		
2004	Aai	Anjali	Tamil		
2005	Englishkaran	Maheshwari	Tamil		
2005	Nayakudu	Uma	Telugu		
2005	Chanakya	Deivanayaki	Tamil		
2005	Bambara Kannaley	Mynaa	Tamil		
2005	Aanai	Ramya	Tamil		
2006	Kovai Brothers	Sania	Tamil		
2006	Love Ke Chakkar Mein	Neha V. Batra	Hindi	Hindi Debut	
2006	Pachchak Kuthira	Poovu	Tamil		
2006	Thagapansamy	Swapna	Tamil		
2006	Nee Venunda Chellam	Anjali	Tamil		
2006	Neelakanta	Ganga	Kannada	Kannada Debut	
2007	Viyabari	Namitha	Tamil		
2007	Naan Avanillai	Monika Prasad	Tamil		
2007	Azhagiya Tamil Magan	Dhanalakshmi	Tamil		
2007	Billa	C. J.	Tamil	Nominated, Filmfare Award for Best Supporting Actress – Tamil	
2008	Sandai	Seemakal Chinnakilli	Tamil		
2008	Kamasutra Nights	Aunt Maya	English	English Debut	
2008	Pandi	Salangai	Tamil		
2008	Indra	Janaki	Kannada		
2009	Perumal	Saroja	Tamil		
2009	Thee	Ruchi Devi	Tamil		
2009	1977	Chandini	Tamil		
2009	Billa	Lisa	Telugu	Nominated, Filmfare Award for Best Supporting Actress – Telugu	
2009	Indira Vizha	Kamini	Tamil		
2009	Jaganmohini	Jaganmohini	Tamil		
2010	Black Stallion	Laura Fernandez	Malayalam	Malayalam Debut	
2010	Azhagaana Ponnuthan	Jennifer	Tamil		
2010	Guru Sishyan	Anitha	Tamil	Cameo	
2010	Simha	Mahima	Telugu		
2010	Hoo	Anju	Kannada		
2011	Ilaignan	Sena	Tamil		
2011	Namitha I Love You	Sunanda	Kannada		
2013	Benki Birugali	Mona	Kannada		
2016	Ilamai Oonjal	Durga	Tamil		
2016	Pulimurugan	Julie	Malayalam		
2019	Pottu	Bhrameshwari	Tamil		
2020	Miya	Miya	Tamil		

== Television ==
Year	Title	Role	Notes
2007-2015	Maanada Mayilada	Main Judge	Dance Reality Show
2017	Bigg Boss Tamil (season 1)	Contestant	Evicted Day 28
2020	Dance Jodi Dance 3.0	Judge	Dance Show
2021	Pudhu Pudhu Arthangal	Herself	Guest Appearance
2021	Kanni Theevu Ullasa Ulagam 2.0	Herself	Guest Appearance
