= Mariamman Temple, Irukkankudi =

Mariamman Temple
- Location in Tamil Nadu

Religion
- Affiliation: Hinduism
- District: Virudhunagar District
- Deity: Mariamman

Location
- Location: Irukkankudi
- State: Tamil Nadu
- Country: India
- Interactive map of Mariamman Temple
- Coordinates: 09°19′54″N 77°59′09″E

Mariamman Temple is a Hindu temple in Irukkankdi, Virudhunagar District, Tamil Nadu, India.

Mariamman is the temple's Moolavar.

== History ==
According to legend, three hundred years ago between the rivers Arjuna and Viparu, a priest wanted to carry home a basket of cow dung that he had collected but could not carry alone. He asked others to help him, but no one was able to carry the basket. The priest, under the influence of Amman, said that Amman was in the ground under the basket and ordered them to take him out and build a temple. The villagers found the idol of Mari Amman and built the temple.

The sanctum sanctorum is under a vimana. The Artha Mandapp and Maha Mandapp are close to the sanctum. Sri Nandeeswara and flag post-Kodimaram are in a line. Lord Vinayaka is under the Arasa Maram. On the west are Vazha Vandha Amman and Rakachi Amman. Pechi Amman and Muppidari Amman are in separate shrines in the northwest. Kathavarayan and Vairavamurthi are in the east. Karuppusami is in the southeast corner. Devotees worship all these deities and Mariamman in order.
