= Irumbu Pookkal =

- Poster
- Directed by: G. M. Kumar
- Written by: G. M. Kumar
- Produced by: R. Pushpa
- Starring: Karthik; Pallavi
- Cinematography: Ilavarasan
- Edited by: Shyam; Vincent
- Music by: M. S. Viswanathan; Ilaiyaraaja
- Production company: Pushphalayam Movies
- Release date: 16 February 1991
- Running time: 120 minutes
- Country: India
- Language: Tamil

Irumbu Pookkal (transl. Iron Flowers) is a 1991 Indian Tamil-language crime film written and directed by G. M. Kumar. The film stars Karthik and Pallavi. It was released on 16 February 1991, and failed at the box office.

== Plot ==
A military commander who had lost his leg in the battle had returned to his village. When his wife received the letter announcing his supposed death, she committed suicide. His children, cousin, and he asked the village politician for a signature in order to receive a pension, but the corrupted politician refused until his cousin agreed to spend the night with him. His cousin then committed suicide as He was killed there by police officers. Dharma, his son, exacted revenge on the police officer by killing him. He was then imprisoned and grew up there.

In prison, Dharma becomes a famous singer, while his sister becomes a reporter. K. Balasubramaniyam, a well-known politician, attempts to become a minister. His party's shortcoming was a lack of female voters. So he arranges a conference with his female members, and then manages to kill and rape them by the supporters of the ruling party. He then publicly blamed the ruling party for the crime. During the encounter, Dharma's sister was also raped. Balasubramaniyam thereafter easily wins the election. Chitra, a feminist journalist and the only witness to the massacre, seeks vengeance with the assistance of Dharma.

== Cast ==
- Karthik as Dharma
- Pallavi as Chitra
- Sathyajith as K. Balasubramaniyam
- R. P. Viswam
- Livingston
- Kumarimuthu
- Haja Sheriff
- Prabhu as Military (guest appearance)
- Rekha as Pavunnu (guest appearance)

== Production ==
According to Kumar, Irumbu Pookkal was "chopped mercilessly" by the censor board.

== Soundtrack ==
The music composed by Ilaiyaraaja and M. S. Viswanathan.

Song	Singer(s)	Composer	Lyrics	Duration
"Eyzhai Unakku"	A. R. Sheik Mohammed	M. S. Viswanathan	Kamakodiyan	3:47
"Muththaana Muththam"	K. S. Chithra, S. P. Balasubrahmanyam	M. S. Viswanathan	Kamakodiyan	4:41
"Naanum Kooda"	Mano	Ilaiyaraaja	Gangai Amaran	4:23
"Rettai Kuruvi"	Mano, P. Susheela	Ilaiyaraaja	Gangai Amaran	4:39
