= Pick Pocket (1989 film) =

- Poster
- Directed by: G. M. Kumar
- Written by: G. M. Kumar; R. P. Viswam (dialogues)
- Produced by: K. Balu
- Starring: Sathyaraj; Radha; S. S. Chandran; Silk Smitha
- Cinematography: Velu Prabhakaran
- Edited by: Durai Shankar
- Music by: Ilaiyaraaja
- Production company: KB Films
- Release date: 23 June 1989
- Country: India
- Language: Tamil

Pick Pocket is a 1989 Indian Tamil-language film directed by G. M. Kumar, starring Sathyaraj and Radha. The film was released on 23 June 1989.

== Plot ==
Rangaraj and Radha, both pickpockets, fall in love and get married. With the help of Rajalakshmi, who also has a passion for art, Rangaraj tries to create a few forged education certificates and applies for the post of police officer. He succeeds in it.

== Cast ==
- Sathyaraj as Rangaraj alias Sathyaraj
- Radha as Rajalakshmi
- S. S. Chandran
- Livingston
- Silk Smitha
- T. Kumar
- Anjana
- Sathyajith

== Production ==
According to Kumar, the film was "chopped mercilessly" by the censor board.

== Soundtrack ==
Soundtrack was composed by Ilaiyaraaja.

Song	Singers	Lyrics
"Kadhal Thiruda"	K. S. Chithra, P. Jayachandran	Gangai Amaran
"Manja Kuruvi"	S. P. Balasubrahmanyam, P. Susheela	Gangai Amaran
"Velaiyai"	Ilaiyaraaja	Ilaiyaraaja
"Poovum Thendral"	S. P. Balasubrahmanyam, K. S. Chithra	Gangai Amaran
"Soodu Romba"	S. P. Sailaja, Mano	Gangai Amaran

== Reception ==
P. S. S. of Kalki wrote even though they have planted rich settings with a large crowd, they have made the film in such a way that it has nothing to do with the understanding of the viewers.
