= Aa Okkati Adakku =

- DVD cover
- Directed by: E. V. V. Satyanarayana
- Written by: L. B. Sriram (dialogues)
- Screenplay by: E. V. V. Satyanarayana
- Story by: P. Kalaimani
- Produced by: M. Saravanan; M. Balasubramaniam
- Starring: Rajendra Prasad; Rambha
- Cinematography: V. Srinivasa Reddy
- Edited by: K. Ravindra Babu
- Music by: Ilaiyaraaja
- Production company: AVM Productions
- Release date: 19 September 1992
- Running time: 155 minutes
- Country: India
- Language: Telugu

Aa Okkati Adakku (transl. Don't ask for that one thing) is a 1992 Indian Telugu-language comedy film directed by E. V. V. Satyanarayana, and produced by M. Saravanan and M. Balasubramaniam under the AVM Productions banner. The film stars Rajendra Prasad, Rambha, and Rao Gopal Rao with music composed by Ilaiyaraaja. Aa Okkati Adakku marks the Telugu debut of actress Rambha.

The film was based on the Tamil film Paaru Paaru Pattanam Paaru (1986). It was a commercial success and was later remade in Kannada as Bal Nan Maga (1995) and in Hindi as Mr. and Mrs. Khiladi (1997).

== Plot ==
The film is set in Visakhapatnam and follows Chitti Babu, a highly educated yet idle man who places great faith in astrology and fortune. He is convinced by an astrologer, Poompuhar Devagna Sarma, that he has Rajayogam and will become a king within a year. Chitti Babu lives with his mother and sister, Kunthi, who pressures him to arrange her marriage, threatening to elope if it is not done soon. Meanwhile, Ganga Raju (Royyala Naidu), a wealthy self-made businessman, refuses to allow his daughter Rambha to marry a rich but lazy man brought to him by a matchmaker. He insists that she marry someone who is hardworking, even if poor.

Chitti Babu saves Rambha from some bullies, and during the encounter, a lizard falls on him, leading him to seek guidance from Poompuhar, who predicts danger will come from a virgin girl. Soon after, Chitti Babu becomes the victim of an accident caused by Rambha's car, and she falls in love with him. Rambha offers Chitti Babu a job at her father's company, but he initially refuses, feeling it beneath his dignity. However, under pressure from his sister, he reluctantly accepts.

Initially disapproving of Rambha's love for Chitti Babu, Royyala Naidu reluctantly agrees to their marriage when Rambha attempts suicide. However, he sets a condition: Chitti Babu must pay a dowry of ₹100,000. To raise the money, Chitti Babu invites a large crowd, including strangers, to the wedding venue, hoping to collect gifts. After the ceremony, Royyala Naidu thwarts his plan and imposes further conditions, including forbidding the couple’s first night until the dowry is fully paid.

Royyala Naidu eventually offers to accept the dowry payment in four installments. Determined to raise the money, Chitti Babu resorts to clever cons, including selling a goat to a gullible man by claiming it can speak and pretending to be a blind man to secure a loan. However, his fraudulent acts are exposed when the man who bought the "talking" goat and the bank officer willing to grant him the loan turn out to be Royyala Naidu’s friends or relatives. Consequently, Royyala Naidu uncovers Chitti Babu's deception and expels him.

Royyala Naidu humiliates Chitti Babu's mother, which prompts Chitti Babu to angrily divorce Rambha. In response, Royyala Naidu arranges for Rambha to remarry. Chitti Babu, heartbroken, defends his right to stop the marriage, and Royyala Naidu offers a final chance: if Chitti Babu clears the debt, he will cancel the marriage.

Meanwhile, Kunthi agrees to marry an elderly man to raise the money for the dowry. After much soul-searching, Chitti Babu sets out to make his fortune. His efforts initially fail, but he eventually stumbles upon a cloth mill owner in the process of attempting suicide due to his business’s bankruptcy. Using his wit and creativity, Chitti Babu turns the company into a profitable venture by introducing new designs. His success leads to a rapid accumulation of wealth.

Chitti Babu returns to the wedding hall to find Kunthi about to marry the elderly man, only to discover that Royyala Naidu orchestrated this entire situation to reform him. The film concludes with Chitti Babu and Rambha finally uniting in marriage.

== Cast ==
- Rajendra Prasad as Atukula Chitti Babu
- Rambha as Rambha
- Rao Gopal Rao as Royyala Naidu / Godavari Gangaraju
- Allu Ramalingaiah as Sahadevudu
- Brahmanandam as Addu Pulla Rao
- Babu Mohan as Poompuhar
- Sakshi Ranga Rao as Pellilla Perayya
- Kallu Chidambaram as Chidambaram
- Chidathala Appa Rao as Rikshavadu
- Kadambari Kiran
- Prudhviraj as Bose Babu
- Radha Kumari as Sahadevudu's wife
- Lathasri as Kunthi
- Annuja as Kannaamba
- Nirmalamma as Chitti Babu's mother

== Music ==
The music for the film was composed by Ilayaraja, marking his only collaboration with E. V. V. Satyanarayana. The soundtrack was released by Akash Audio Company. Notably, the song "Pavurama" was based on Ilayaraja's own composition, "Shenbagame," from the 1987 film Enga Ooru Pattukaran.

Track listing
No.	Title	Lyrics	Singer(s)	Length
1.	"Rajadhi Rajanu"	Veturi Sundararama Murthy	S. P. Balasubrahmanyam	5:09
2.	"Ko Ko Kona Kona"	Veturi	S. P. Balasubrahmanyam, S. Janaki	5:10
3.	"Vareva Maanava"	Veturi	S. P. Balasubrahmanyam, S. Janaki	5:07
4.	"Ammommo Rathiri"	Veturi	S. Janaki	5:39
5.	"Pavuramaa Pavuramaa"	Veturi	S. P. Balasubrahmanyam, S. Janaki	5:08
6.	"Uncle Digiravemayoi"	Veturi	S. P. Balasubrahmanyam	5:08
Total length:				31:21

== Reception ==
The film was a commercial success and was later remade in Kannada as Bal Nan Maga (1995) and in Hindi Mr. and Mrs. Khiladi (1997).

Rao Gopala Rao’s performance received praise. The film features double entendre in its dialogue and faced criticism for obscenity. This marked one of E. V. V. Satyanarayana’s early controversies involving sexual explicitness, a theme that would resurface in his later film Alluda Majaaka (1995).

== Impact ==
In 2017, Rao Gopal Rao's son Rao Ramesh played Royyalu Naidu in the film DJ: Duvvada Jagannadham, which is based on and named after Gopal Rao's character in the film.
