= B. R. Vijayalakshmi =

Indian cinematographer

- Born: India
- Occupations: Cinematographer, screenwriter, director
- Spouse: S. Sunil Kumar
- Father: B. R. Panthulu

Budaguru Ramakrishnaiah Vijayalakshmi is an Indian cinematographer who works primarily in Tamil cinema.

== Early life ==
Vijayalakshmi is the daughter of veteran legendary film director and producer B. R. Panthulu. He died while she was in college. She decided to devote herself to cinema. She worked as an interior designer before entering the film industry.

== Career ==
=== Cinematography ===
Vijayalakshmi started her career as an assistant to cinematographer Ashok Kumar, who convinced her to leave film school to work as a camera assistant. She worked for Kumar on the 1980 Tamil film Nenjathai Killathe and continued for nearly 30 films over the next three years. During this time she did "Clash work" for films such as Kai Kodukkum Kai (1984) and Pillai Nila (1985).

Vijayalakshmi's feature film debut came in 1985 with the Tamil film Chinna Veedu. Known as Asia's first female cinematographer, Vijayalakshmi has worked in 22 feature films between 1985 and 1995, including Aruvadai Naal (1986), Sirai Paravai (1987) and Iniya Uravu Poothathu (1987) for directors including C. V. Sridhar and G. M. Kumar. She wrote the script for Sangeeth Sivan's Malayalam film Daddy (1992). In 1995, she made her directorial debut through Paattu Padava for which she wrote the script and handled the cinematography. The film was screened at the International Film Festival of India in 1996 and it was known for its songs by Ilaiyaraaja.

=== Music and TV ===
Vijayalakshmi was appointed as the creative head of Saregama, an Indian music company. In September 2005, she became the business head of the TV Software Division of Saregama. Saregama later moved into the manufacturing and sales of radio-like MP3 players called Carvaan.

After Vijayalakshmi's wedding, she left films and entered television. The children's serial Vasantham Colony was her first attempt at TV. Since then, she has worked on many South Indian television series produced by Saregama, including My Dear Bhootham, Raja Rajeswari, and Athipookal. She was the first to introduce computer graphics to Tamil TV shows.

== Personal life ==
Vijayalakshmi's brother B. R. Ravishankar is a filmmaker in Kannada cinema. He is an IIT graduate and entered cinema after his father's death.

She is a friend of actress Suhasini Maniratnam since childhood. Suhasini's husband Mani Ratnam was a close teenage friend of Vijayalakshmi's brother Ravishankar, which led to Suhasini and Ratnam's marriage.

Vijayalakshmi married Sunil Kumar, a sound recordist. They have a son.

== Partial filmography ==
=== As cinematographer ===
- Chinna Veedu (1985)
- Aruvadai Naal (1986)
- Iniya Uravu Poothathu (1987)
- Sirai Paravai (1987)
- Therkathi Kallan (1988)
- December 31 (1988)
- En Purushanthaan Enakku Mattumthaan (1989)
- Poruthathu Pothum (1989)
- Mallu Vetti Minor (1990)
- Manasara Vazhthungalen (1991)
- Manitha Jaathi (1991)
- Thalattu Ketkuthamma (1991)
- Vetri Padigal (1991)
- Kottai Vaasal (1992)
- Therku Theru Machan (1992)
- Thalattu (1993)
- Ravanan (1994)
- Paattu Padava (1995)

=== As writer ===
- Daddy (1992)

=== As director ===
- Paattu Padava (1995)
- Abhiyum Anuvum (2018)

=== Television ===
- Velan (2002)
- Maya Machinthra (2003)
