= Roshagara =

1992 film by Om Sai Prakash

- Directed by: Om Sai Prakash
- Written by: Chi. Udayashankar; Om Sai Prakash; Nanjunda
- Produced by: K. Sukumar
- Starring: Devaraj; Anjana; Mukhyamantri Chandru
- Cinematography: Johny Lal
- Edited by: P. Venkateshwara Rao
- Music by: Upendra Kumar
- Production company: Sneha Arts
- Release date: 1992
- Running time: 117 minutes
- Country: India
- Language: Kannada

Roshagara is a 1992 Indian Kannada crime film directed by Om Sai Prakash who also penned the story for which the screenplay was written by Nanjunda. Produced by K. Sukumar, Upendra Kumar scored and composed the film's soundtrack. The film featured Devaraj, Anjana and Mukhyamantri Chandru in the lead roles.

== Synopsis ==
Vijay kidnaps Sushama, the daughter of a well known social worker, Dharmaraj and threatens him not to inform anyone else. Sushama who is given the freedom to move within the room in which she is locked chances upon Vijay's personal diary. As the story cuts to a flashback it is revealed that Vijay, who was an honest police officer, locked horns with Dharmaraj who unknown to the public is a corrupt and crooked businessman. After initial altercations, Priya, the chief reporter in a prominent newspaper, falls in love with Vijay after he makes her realise how she was manipulated by Dharmaraj for his personal gains. But Vijay is still not ready to trust her. After happening to witness a murder Priya persuades to move to the crime scene only to be rebuffed since he believes it to be a prank. Dharmaraj, who had assigned goons to murder that person, fearing that Priya might pit him against the public and thereby destroy his reputation manages to frame her in a murder case and an attempted murder on Home Minister forcing Vijay to arrest her. The court rewards her death sentence causing her to believe that Vijay did this to her on purpose. Upon realising the truth Vijay quits his job and resolves to save her. The story cuts to the present with Sushama pledging to help Vijay in his mission. Vijay takes her back to her house. It is revealed that when Priya was once taken out of the prison Vijay sedated everyone and impregnated Priya without her knowledge since pregnant women should not be killed by the law. Dharmaraj, however, makes others believe that Priya's pregnancy is a ruse. He then decides to move to United States on the pretext of treatment with his daughter whom he discovers to be a spy of Vijay and only return a few days before elections. However, Sushama informs Vijay about Dharmaraj's plans. Vijay manages to trace Dharmaraj and stop him from travelling to the airport. After bashing his goons, he chases Dharmaraj to a hospital where Kumar, Dharmaraj's secretary happens to hold Priya as hostage. After rescuing Priya he beats Dharmaraj and with the support of Sushama produces him in the court. Proven guilty Dharmaraj's given a death penalty while Priya's sentence is revoked.

== Cast ==
- Devaraj as Inspector Vijay
- Anjana as Priya
- Mukhyamantri Chandru as Dharmaraj
- Sihi Kahi Chandru as Kumar
- Thara as Sushama
- Tennis Krishna as Ramappa
- Ramesh Bhat as Jailer

== Soundtrack ==
Roshagara

Soundtrack album by Upendra Kumar
- Released: 31 August 1992
- Recorded: 1992
- Genre: Feature film soundtrack
- Language: Kannada
- Label: Lahari Music

The soundtrack album scored and composed by Upendra Kumar with lyrics penned by Chi. Udayashankar comprises 4 tracks sung by Mano and Sangeetha Katti.

1. Nanna Nudiyalli by Mano
2. Ee Baalu Ennodu by Mano
3. Oh Police Mr. Police by Sangeetha Katti
4. Ninna Kandaaga (duet) by Mano and Sangeetha Katti
