= Hari Prasad (actor) =

Indian actor and director

- Born: K. Hari Prasad
- Died: 17 August 2008
- Occupations: Actor; producer; director
- Years active: 1978–2002
- Notable work: Sivaranjani (1978), Kotha Jeevithalu (1981), Yamudiki Mogudu (1988)

K. Hari Prasad was an Indian actor, producer, and director, who worked predominantly in Telugu and Kannada-language films.

== Early life and career ==
During his time at the Madras Film Institute, he was roommates with Chiranjeevi and Sudhakar. He made his film debut in Sivaranjani (1978) by Dasari Narayana Rao and played another leading role in Kotha Jeevithalu by Bharathiraja costarring Suhasini. After not being able to sustain himself as an actor, he switched to production and notably co-produced films such as Yamudiki Mogudu (1988) and Policena Hendthi (1990). He turned director with the Kannada film Shreemathi (1997) for which Chiranjeevi traveled to Bengaluru for the muhurat.

== Personal life ==
He died of cardiac arrest on 17 August 2008.

== Filmography ==
As actor

- Sivaranjani (1978)
- Sri Rama Bantu (1979)
- Natchathiram (1980; Tamil)
- Thathayya Premaleelalu (1980)
- Srivari Muchatlu (1981)
- Viswaroopam (1981)
- Kotha Jeevithalu (1981)
- Bharatamlo Shankaravam (1984)
- Maharaju (1985)
- Poojaku Panikiraani Puvvu (1986)
- Ramu (1987)
- Chakravarthy (1987)
- Rotation Chakravarthy (1987)
- Jebu Donga (1987)
- Yamudiki Mogudu (1988)
- Maharajasri Mayagadu (1988)
- Doragarintlo Dongodu (1988)
- Athaku Yamudu Ammayiki Mogudu (1989)
- Lankeswarudu (1989)
- Gang Leader (1991)
- Neetho Cheppalani (2002)

As co-producer

- Yamudiki Mogudu (1988)
- Policena Hendthi (1990)
- Nagaradalli Nayakaru (1992)

As director

- Shreemathi (1997)
