= Mr. and Mrs. Khiladi =

1997 Indian film by David Dhawan

- Directed by: David Dhawan
- Written by: Rumi Jaffery
- Story by: P. Kalaimani
- Based on: Aa Okkati Adakku (1992)
- Produced by: Keshu Ramsay
- Starring: Akshay Kumar; Juhi Chawla; Gulshan Grover; Satish Kaushik; Paresh Rawal; Kader Khan
- Cinematography: K.S. Prakash Rao
- Edited by: A. Muthu
- Music by: Anu Malik
- Distributed by: D.M.S. Films
- Release date: 10 October 1997
- Running time: 150 minutes
- Country: India
- Language: Hindi
- Budget: ₹5.75 crore
- Box office: ₹16.75 crore

Mr. and Mrs. Khiladi (transl. Mr. and Mrs. Player) is a 1997 Indian Hindi-language romantic comedy film directed by David Dhawan. The film was a remake of the 1992 Telugu film Aa Okkati Adakku,. which itself is based on the Tamil film Paaru Paaru Pattanam Paaru.

It stars Akshay Kumar and Juhi Chawla. Some scenes take place in Toronto, Ontario, Canada. The fifth installment of the Khiladi series, Mr. and Mrs. Khiladi predominantly explores the comedy genre, unlike other films in the series. The film was a semi-hit at the box office.

== Summary ==
When his astrologer uncle (Satish Kaushik) predicts a favorable future for Raja (Akshay Kumar), he decides to do nothing until the prediction comes true.

One day he meets a woman at a bus stop. She tries to talk to him but he replies to her rudely because his uncle told him not to talk to an unmarried girl. He later finds out that she is married. He then tries to be frank with her but suddenly her husband arrives to beat him. Raja then collides with Shalu's (Juhi Chawla) car, who is the daughter of a millionaire (Kader Khan). He is seriously injured and Shalu is arrested. His uncle meets him in the hospital and tells him that he should forgive Shalu. He says to the inspector that this is his mistake, and they should release Shalu. They release Shalu from jail and then she goes to meet Raja but he doesn't want to meet her. She falls in love with him, and Shalu tells her father that her future husband has arrived. However, his lazy lifestyle does not meet with his future father-in-law's standards, and he insists that Raja does some hard work and bring him ₹100,000 to have Suhag Raat with his daughter. Eventually Raja accomplishes this by defeating Kaalu Pehelwan (Emmanuel Yarborough) in a wrestling match.

== Cast ==
- Akshay Kumar as Raja / Rajant Kapoor (Mr. Khiladi)
- Juhi Chawla as Shalu Prasad (Mrs. Khiladi)
- Kader Khan as Badri Prasad
- Paresh Rawal as Pratap (Shalu's Uncle)
- Himani Shivpuri as Raja's mother
- Prachi as Kiran Kapoor (Raja's Sister)
- Satish Kaushik as Mama (Raja's Uncle)
- Johnny Lever as a bandaged patient on the street
- Gulshan Grover as Vicky
- Emmanuel Yarborough as Kaalu
- Anil Dhawan as Bose Babu
- Upasna Singh as Pratap's Girlfriend
- Rakesh Bedi as Ram Babu
- Mac Mohan as Police Inspector
- Shashi Kiran as Postman
- Birbal as Pandit
- Gurbachchan Singh as Angry Husband
- Babbanlal Yadav as Constable
- Kishore Bhanushali as Bandwala

== Filming ==
The shooting of the song "Akela Hai Mr. Khiladi" took place in Ontario, Canada. Some parts of it were shot at the Niagara Falls, while the other part (75%) was shot near the Square One Shopping Centre in Mississauga. The Central Library and other buildings nearby were shown. The song Jara Parde Pe Ane De was shot inside BCE Place in Toronto.

== Music ==
Mr. & Mrs. Khiladi

Soundtrack album by Anu Malik
- Released: 26 May 1997
- Genre: Feature film soundtrack
- Length: 39:09
- Label: T Series

The music for the movie was composed by Anu Malik and many of the songs were hits.

No.	Title	Singer(s)	Length
1.	"Akela Hai Mr. Khiladi"	Udit Narayan, Anuradha Paudwal	06:22
2.	"Jab Naukari Milegi"	Kumar Sanu	06:45
3.	"Hum Total Fida Tum Pe"	Anu Malik, Anuradha Paudwal & Jaspinder Narula	06:57
4.	"Mujhe Hero Ban Jaane De"	Udit Narayan, Poornima	06:31
5.	"Samose Mein Aaloo"	Abhijeet Bhattacharya, Poornima & Sapna Mukherjee	05:27
6.	"Jumme Ke Jumme"	Abhijeet Bhattacharya, Poornima	07:07
Total length:			39:09

== See also ==
- List of Bollywood films of 1997#Releases
