= Hatamari Hennu Kiladi Gandu =

- Directed by: Renuka Sharma
- Screenplay by: Renuka Sharma
- Story by: P. Kalaimani
- Based on: En Purushanthaan Enakku Mattumthaan (1989) by Manobala
- Produced by: M. Chandrashekar
- Starring: Sridhar; Malashri; Anjana
- Cinematography: S. V. Srikanth
- Edited by: K. Balu
- Music by: Rajan–Nagendra
- Production company: Sri Nimishamba Productions
- Release date: 1992
- Running time: 141 minutes
- Country: India
- Language: Kannada

Hatamari Hennu Kiladi Gandu is a 1992 Indian Kannada-language drama film directed by Renuka Sharma and written by P. Kalaimani. The film stars Malashri, Sridhar and Anjana. The film's music was composed by Rajan–Nagendra and the audio was launched on the Lahari Music banner. The film was a remake of Tamil film En Purushanthaan Enakku Mattumthaan.

== Cast ==
- Malashri as Sharada
- Sridhar as Madhusudhan
- Anjana as Sowmya
- Mukhyamantri Chandru
- Ramesh Bhat as Lawyer Vishwanath
- Jaggesh as Jaggesh
- Umashri
- Abhinaya as Shanthi
- Vaishali Kasaravalli as Annapoorna
- Mysore Lokesh
- Bangalore Nagesh
- Mandeep Roy
- Keerthiraj
- Baby Sindhu as Jr. Sharada
- Vaijanath Biradar

== Soundtrack ==
The music of the film was composed by Rajan–Nagendra with lyrics by Chi. Udaya Shankar.

Track listing
No.	Title	Lyrics	Singer(s)	Length
1.	"Hejje Mele Hejje"	Chi. Udaya Shankar	S. P. Balasubrahmanyam, K. S. Chithra
2.	"Rammina Matthige"	Chi. Udaya Shankar	Manjula Gururaj
3.	"Banni Banni Nammavare"	Chi. Udaya Shankar	S. P. Balasubrahmanyam
4.	"Sokalu Ee Kai"	Chi. Udaya Shankar	K. S. Chithra
5.	"Barede Ninna Hesarannu"	Chi. Udaya Shankar	K. S. Chithra, S. P. Balasubrahmanyam
