= Minor Raja =

- Directed by: Katragadda Ravi Teja
- Written by: Jandhyala (dialogues)
- Story by: P. Kalaimani
- Based on: Mallu Vetti Minor (1990)
- Produced by: V. Rambabu; K. P. Panakala Rao
- Starring: Rajendra Prasad; Shobana; Rekha
- Cinematography: K. Ram Gopal Reddy
- Edited by: V. Suresh Kumar
- Music by: Vidyasagar
- Production company: Rakesh Productions
- Release date: 4 June 1991
- Running time: 136 minutes
- Country: India
- Language: Telugu

Minor Raja is a 1991 Indian Telugu-language comedy drama film, produced by V. Rambabu, K. P. Panakala Rao under the Rakesh Productions banner and directed by Katragadda Ravi Teja. It stars Rajendra Prasad, Shobana, Rekha with music composed by Vidyasagar. The film is remake of the Tamil film Mallu Vetti Minor (1990). The film was a box office failure.

== Cast ==
- Rajendra Prasad as Minor Raja & Gopal Rayudu (Dual role)
- Shobana as Santhana Lakshmi
- Rekha as Sita Mahalakshmi
- Kota Srinivasa Rao as President
- Brahmanandam as Avataram
- Mallikarjuna Rao as Paramasivam
- Narra Venkateswara Rao as Ram Murthy
- Gundu Hanumantha Rao as Alamkaram
- Subbaraya Sharma as Sita's father
- Sanjeevi as Pattabhi
- Anitha as Paramasivam's wife
- Mamatha
- Chilakala Radha as Visalakshi
- Jaya Malini as item number
- Y. Vijaya as Balamani

== Soundtrack ==
Minor Raja

Film score by Vidyasagar
- Released: 1990
- Genre: Soundtrack
- Length: 28:53
- Label: Surya Music
- Producer: Vidyasagar

Vidyasagar chronology
Teneteega (1990)	Minor Raja (1990)	Sarpayagam (1991)

Music composed by Vidyasagar. Music released on Surya Music Company.

Track listing
No.	Title	Lyrics	Singer(s)	Length
1.	"Manase Dhochu"	Jaladi	Ramakrishna, Jikki	5:00
2.	"Cheliya"	Jaladi	S. P. Balasubrahmanyam, K. S. Chithra	4:51
3.	"Nadiveedhilo"	Veturi	K. J. Yesudas, K. S. Chithra	4:30
4.	"O Madana"	Jaladi	S. P. Balasubrahmanyam, K. S. Chithra, S. P. Sailaja	4:31
5.	"Vennella"	Veturi	S. P. Balasubrahmanyam, K. S. Chithra	4:54
6.	"Yendammo"	Veturi	K. S. Chithra	5:07
Total length:				28:53
