= Kotha Jeevithalu =

- Poster
- Directed by: Bharathiraja
- Story by: R. Selvaraj
- Produced by: Ravula Ankaiah Gowd
- Starring: Hari Prasad; Suhasini
- Cinematography: B. Kannan
- Edited by: Kotagiri Venkateswara Rao
- Music by: Ilaiyaraaja
- Production company: Raveendra Films
- Release date: 24 January 1981
- Country: India
- Language: Telugu

Kotha Jeevithalu (transl. New lives) is a 1981 Indian Telugu-language film directed by Bharathiraja. It is a remake of his own Tamil film Puthiya Vaarpugal (1979) and stars Hari Prasad and Suhasini. The film was a box office failure.

== Cast ==
- Hari Prasad as Gopalam
- Nutan Prasad as the village chief
- Rajyalakshmi
- Suhasini as Jothi
- Gummadi
- Dr Siva Prasad
- Poornima
- Master Seenu
- Master Sudhakar
- Ravula Dasaradharammayya Gowd
- M D S Reddy
- Gummadi Srinivas
- Ramana Rao
- Ramakrishna
- Rebala Srilakshmi
- Vijaya
- Satyavathi

== Production ==
Kotha Jeevithalu is the first Telugu film for both director Bharathiraja and actress Suhasini, and is a remake of the director's own Tamil film Puthiya Vaarpugal (1979).

== Soundtrack ==
The music was composed by Ilaiyaraaja.

Track listing
| No. | Title | Lyrics | Singer(s) | Length |
|---|---|---|---|---|
| 1. | "Pongi Porale" | C. Narayana Reddy | S. P. Balasubrahmanyam, S. Janaki | 4:56 |
| 2. | "Manase Vellene" | Acharya Aatreya | P. Susheela | 3:54 |
| 3. | "Tham Thananam" | C. Narayana Reddy | P. Susheela, S. Janaki | 4:20 |
| 4. | "Manase Vellene" (Duet) | Acharya Aatreya | Ilaiyaraaja, P. Susheela | 4:03 |
| 5. | "Yentha Sogunnavu" | Kosaraju | S. P. Balasubrahmanyam, S. Janaki | 5:00 |
| Total length: | | | | 26:37 |
