= Seetha (actress) =

Indian actress

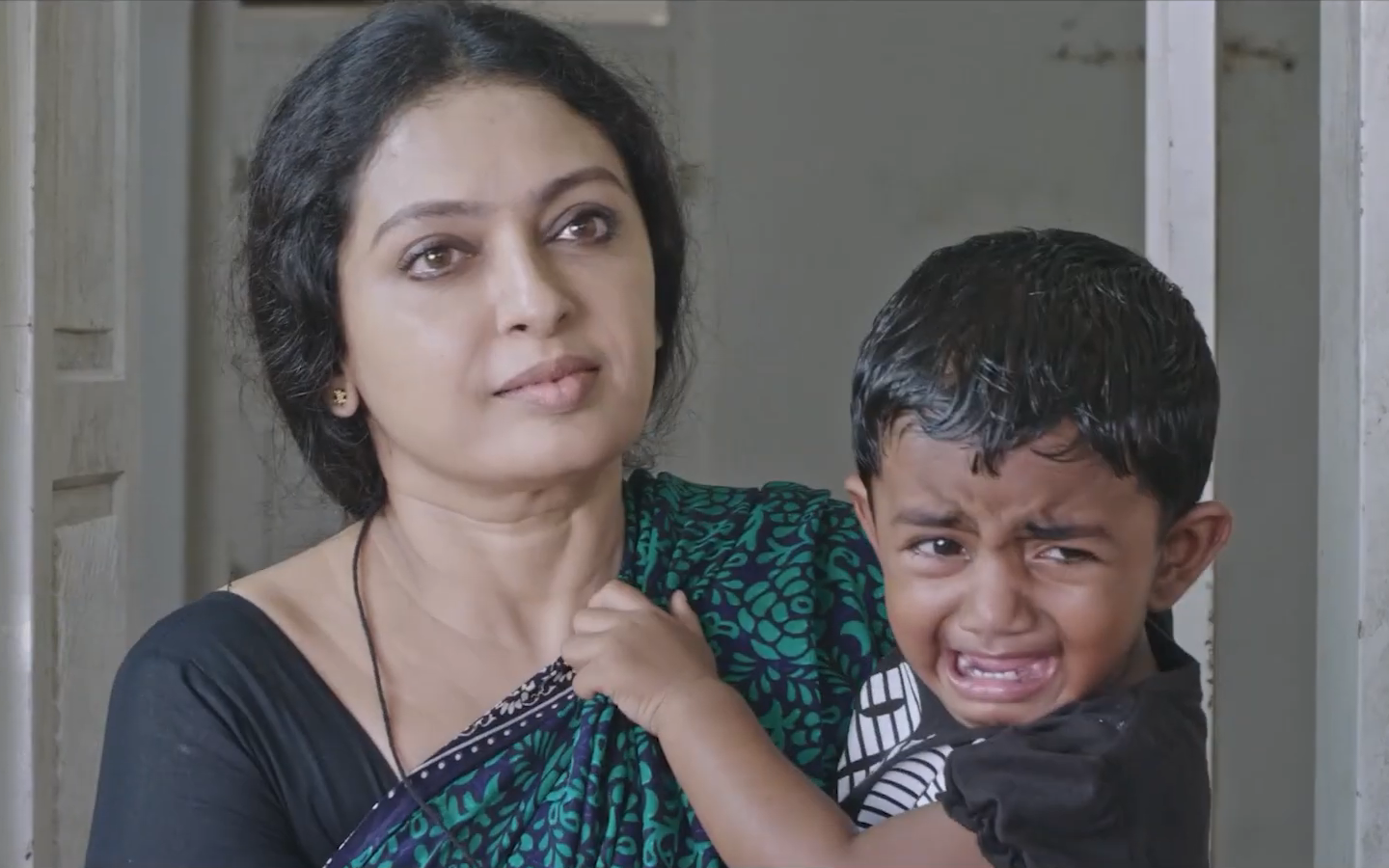
- Seetha attends a children's event held as part of a movie promotion in 2026
- Occupations: Actor; producer
- Years active: 1985–1991; 2002–present
- Spouses: R. Parthiban (m. 1990; div. 2004) Sateesh (m. 2010; div. 2016)
- Children: 3

Sairandhri, better known by her stage name Seetha, is an Indian actress and producer known for her works predominantly in Tamil, Telugu, Malayalam, and a few Kannada films.

== Career ==
She made her debut in 1985 with the Tamil film Aan Paavam. After acting in films until 1991, Seetha took a hiatus before returning to the screen in 2002. Some of her most memorable roles have come in Tamil films like Thangachi (1987), Guru Sishyan (1988), Unnal Mudiyum Thambi (1988) and Pudhea Paadhai (1989). She acted as a heroine in her earlier days, and then acted in supporting roles. Some of her Telugu films are Muddula Mavayya (1989), Muthyamantha Muddu (1989), Police Bharya (1990), Simhadri (2003) and Bunny (2005). She won a Tamil Nadu State Film Award for Best Supporting Actress for her performance in Rightaa Thappaa (2005).

Seetha has acted in some Tamil, Malayalam and Telugu serials. She has acted in the Tamil serials Velan (2002-2004), Penn (2006) and Idhayam (2009-2012) for Sun TV.

== Personal life ==
Seetha married actor Parthiban in 1990. The couple has two daughters including P. S. Keerthana, who acted in Kannathil Muthamittal, and an adopted son. The couple decided to part ways in 2001.

== Filmography ==
=== Tamil ===
Year	Film	Role	Notes
1985	Aan Paavam	Seetha	Debut film
1986	Aayiram Pookkal Malarattum	Seetha	
1987	Ival Oru Pournami	Meena	
1987	Ore Raththam	Kamatchi	
1987	Shankar Guru	Seetha	
1987	Thangachi	Seetha	
1987	Thulasi	Thulasi	
1988	Guru Sishyan	Chithra	
1988	Penmani Aval Kanmani	Uma	
1988	Kai Koduppal Karpagambal	Vedha	
1988	Dhayam Onnu	Deepa	
1988	Aval Mella Sirithal	Geetha	
1988	Manaivi Oru Mandiri	Shanthi	
1988	Unnal Mudiyum Thambi	Lalithakamalam	
1989	Annanukku Jai	Gomathi	
1989	Dilli Babu	Valli	
1989	Kadhal Enum Nadhiyinile	Ganga	
1989	Pudhiya Paadhai	Seetha	
1989	Oru Thottil Sabatham		
1989	Padicha Pulla	Lakshmi	
1989	Ponnu Pakka Poren	Kasthuri	
1989	Manasukketha Maharasa	Thenmozhi	
1989	Rajanadai	Seetha	
1989	Vetri Mel Vetri	Janaki	
1989	Vettaiyaadu Vilaiyaadu	Seetha	
1990	Aadi Velli	Valli	
1990	Vetri Malai		
1990	Amma Pillai	Nelli	
1990	Mallu Vetti Minor	Parimala	
1990	Maruthu Pandi	Kanagavalli	
1990	Sakthi Parasakthi	Sakthi	
1990	Thangaikku Oru Thalattu	Priya	
1991	Annan Kaattiya Vazhi	Geetha	
1991	Malare Kurunji Malare	Latha	
1992	Sugamana Sumaigal	Herself	Producer also
2002	Maaran	Seetha	
2002	Kadhal Azhivathillai	Simbu's mother	
2004	Jai	Vajravelu's wife	
2004	Madhurey	Kamakshi	
2004	Gajendra	Mahalakshmi	
2005	Sukran	Judge Manimekalai	
2005	Rightaa Thappaa	Sathya's mother	Tamil Nadu State Film Award for Best Supporting Actress
2005	Jathi	Kavitha's mother	
2005	Sevvel	Sevanthi	
2005	Daas	Rajeshwari's mother	
2005	Chanakya	Kalyani	
2005	Priyasakhi	Doctor	
2005	Karka Kasadara	Anjali’s sister in law	
2005	Varapogum Sooriyane	Annapoorni	
2006	Aathi	Lakshmi	
2006	Paramasivan	Subramaniyam Siva's mother	
2006	Parijatham	Surendhar's mother	
2006	Kaivantha Kalai	Police sub inspector	
2007	Agaram	Thiru's mother	
2007	Viyabari	Suryaprakash's mother	
2007	Maa Madurai	Saravanan's mother	
2007	Kanna	Annapoorani's mother	
2008	Vedha	Vijay's mother	
2008	Valluvan Vasuki	Kanagu	
2009	Arumugam	Arumugam's mother	
2010	Siddhu +2	Siddhu's mother	
2010	Kumari Pennin Ullathile	Saradha	
2011	Ponnar Shankar	Azhagu Nachiyar	
2012	Chaarulatha	Dr. Swaroopa	
2013	Thiru Pugazh	Gayathri's mother	
2014	Jamai	Taxi customer	
2015	Thanga Magan	Aravinth's mother	
2016	Oru Melliya Kodu	Dr. Brinda	
2017	Mecheri Vana Bhadrakali	Bhadrakali	
2019	Kolaigaran	Lakshmi	
2019	Thambi	Padma	
2020	Thottu Vidum Dhooram	Azhagu’s mother	
2022	Saayam	Marudhu’s mother	
2022	Trigger	Prabhakaran's mother	
2024	Oru Thee	Surya's mother	
2024	Brother	Saraswathi	
2025	Akkenam	Indira's mother	

=== Telugu ===
Year	Film	Role	Notes
1986	Vijrumbhana	Komala	
1987	Chinnari Devatha		
1987	Dabbevariki Chedu	Mamatha	
1988	Aadade Aadharam		
1988	Sagatu Manishi		
1988	Annapurnamma Gari Alludu		
1988	Bazaar Rowdy		
1988	Nyayam Kosam	Lalitha	
1989	Aarthanadam	Seetha	
1989	Chinnari Sneham		
1989	Muddula Mavayya	Lakshmi	
1989	Muthyamantha Muddu	Vidyadhari	
1989	Swara Kalpana		
1990	Police Bharya		
1990	Chevilo Puvvu	Anupama	
1991	Nayakuralu		
1991	Maha Yagnam		
2003	Gangotri	Simhadri's mother	
2003	Praanam	Sivudu's mother	
2003	Maha Yagnam		
2003	Simhadri	Saraswathi	
2003	Sambaram	Ravi's sister-in-law	
2004	Athade Oka Sainyam	Raghava's wife	
2005	Bunny	Bunny's aunt	
2005	Mahanandi	Swami's mother	
2006	Iddaru Attala Muddula Alludu		
2008	Vaana	Bharati	
2008	Hare Ram	Hari and Ram's mother	
2008	Aalayam		
2008	Ankit, Pallavi & Friends	Sita	
2009	Maska	Saroja	
2009	Drona	Meenakshi	
2009	Sankham	Parvathi	
2012	Denikaina Ready		
2012	Nandeeswarudu	Lakshmi	
2012	Tuneega Tuneega	Rani	
2012	Chaduvukovali		
2013	Bunny n Cherry	Bunny's mother	
2014	Rabhasa	Peddi Reddy's wife	
2015	Gaddam Gang	Dharmaraju's wife	
2015	Tommy	Viswam Master's wife	
2016	Jyo Achyutananda	Achyuth and Anand's mother	
2017	Goutham Nanda	Satya	
2023	Ala Ila Ela	Surya’s mother	
2023	Devil: The British Secret Agent	Vijaya's mother	
2024	Manamey	Kushi’s grandmother	

=== Malayalam ===
Year	Film	Role	Notes
1986	Koodanayum Kattu	Annie	
1991	Master Plan		
2005	Thanmathra	Swarnam	
2006	Notebook	Pooja's mother	
2007	Vinodayathra	Vimala	
2009	Currency	Keshu's mother	
2009	Vellathooval	Sofiya	
2010	Oru Small Family	Kausalya	
2012	Grandmaster	Chandrika Narayanan	
2012	My Boss	Lakshmi	
2012	Simhasanam	Nirmala	(photo credit)
2013	Romans	Akash's mother	(photo credit)
2013	Pattam Pole	Susan Mathews	
2014	Villali Veeran	Sidharthan's mother	
2015	Kukkiliyar	Sarojini Amma	
2015	Charlie	Tessa's mother	
2016	Oozham	Subbalakshmi	
2016	Kasaba	Arjun's mother	(photo presence)
2017	Role Models	Gautham's mother	
2019	Love Action Drama	Shobha's mother	(photo presence)
2021	Michael's Coffee House Movie	Vincent's mother	
2022	Aaraattu	Sulochana	
2023	Pakalum Paathiravum	Mariya	
2024	DNA	Amrutha	

=== Kannada ===
Year	Film	Role	Notes
1990	Abhimanyu		
2006	Suntaragaali	Jaggu's Mother	
2006	Neelakanta		
2011	Mallikarjuna		
2011	Saarathi	Raja's Mother	
2014	Super Ranga	Ranga's Mother	
2016	Santhu Straight Forward	Santu's Mother	
2016	Game		
2017	Satya Harishchandra		
2019	Shree Atharvana Prathyangira		

== Television ==
Year	Serial	Role	Language	Channel
2002-2004	Velan	Uma	Tamil	Sun TV
2004	Samarasam		Tamil	Sun TV
2005	Swantham Malootty		Malayalam	Surya TV
2005	Penninte Kadha	Radha	Malayalam	Asianet
2006	Penn	Ranganayaki	Tamil	Sun TV
2008–2009	Jananam		Tamil	Mega TV
2009–2012	Idhayam	Dr.Kalyani	Tamil	Sun TV
2016	Chechiyamma	Lakshmikutty teacher	Malayalam	Surya TV
2018–2019	Jyothi	Shivani	Telugu	Star Maa
2020-2021	Thanthu Vitten Ennai (webseries)	Rajarajeshwari	Tamil	ZEE5
2024	My Perfectt Husband (webseries)	Saraswathi	Tamil	Hotstar
