= Enga Ooru Rasathi =

- Poster
- Directed by: N. S. Rajendran
- Screenplay by: N. S. Rajendran
- Story by: P. Kalaimani
- Produced by: N. S. Rajendran
- Starring: Sudhakar; Radhika
- Cinematography: G. Thyagu
- Edited by: M. Vellaichamy; M. Kesavan
- Music by: Gangai Amaran
- Production company: Ravi Combines
- Release date: 4 October 1980
- Running time: 105 minutes
- Country: India
- Language: Tamil

Enga Ooru Rasathi (transl. Our town's princess) is a 1980 Indian Tamil-language film, directed and produced by N. S. Rajendran. The film stars Sudhakar and Radhika, with Goundamani and S. R. Vijaya in supporting roles. It was released on 4 October 1980, and did not do well at the box office.

== Cast ==
- Sudhakar
- Radhika
- Goundamani
- Gandhimathi in Guest appearance
- S. R. Vijaya
- Latha
- C. K. Saraswathi
- Ambika
- Sethuraja
- Prabhakar
- G. Krishnamurthy
- Selvaraj
- C. R. S. Murthy
- Thirumurthy

== Soundtrack ==
The music was composed by Gangai Amaran.

Song	Singers	Lyrics	Length
"Ponmaanai Thedi"	Malaysia Vasudevan, S. P. Sailaja	Muthulingam	04:18
"Enga Ooru Mariyamma Thanjamana Kaaliyamma"	Malaysia Vasudevan	Gangai Amaran	4:43
"Asapattu Paatha Oru Azhagana Ponnu"	S. Janaki	Vaali	4:18
"Sirikki Oruthi Singara"	Malaysia Vasudevan, S. P. Sailaja	Vaali	4:30
