= Aathanka =

- VCD cover of the film
- ಆತಂಕ
- Directed by: Sai Prakash
- Screenplay by: S. Surendranath
- Story by: S. Surendranath
- Produced by: Sharada Sastry; S. V. Prasad
- Starring: Anant Nag; Vinaya Prasad
- Cinematography: Johny Lal
- Edited by: K. Narasaiah
- Music by: Hamsalekha
- Production company: S. S. Productions
- Release date: 22 January 1993
- Running time: 127 minutes
- Country: India
- Language: Kannada

Aathanka (transl. Anxiety) is a 1993 Indian Kannada drama thriller film directed by Sai Prakash, and stars Anant Nag and Vinaya Prasad in the lead roles. The supporting cast features Anjana, Mukhyamantri Chandru and Sarika. The film depicts the marital life of a woman being disturbed by another woman suffering from paranoid personality disorder, who develops hatred towards men after being subjected to domestic violence by her husband.

Upon theatrical release on 22 January 1993, the film won critical praise. At the 1992–93 Karnataka State Film Awards, the film won six awards — Second Best Film, Best Actress (Vinaya Prasad), Best Story and Best Screenplay (S. Surendranath), Best Cinematographer (Johny Lal) and Best Editor (K. Narasaiah).

== Plot ==
Raghu (Anant Nag) is a serious man without visible emotions and lives his life hiding some kind of deep pain inside him. However, this changes when he meets Vani (Vinaya Prasad) at a marriage party of their common friend. Both fall in love and as their love blossoms, Raghu is visibly full of life and happy. They decide to get married. They are living a happy married life until one day Abhilasha shows up at their door step while Raghu is not at home and explains to Vani that Raghu is a very dangerous man and that Vani's life is in danger. Vani discredits this, but as days go by she gets suspicious of Raghu's behaviour and starts wondering why Raghu does not talk about his past. Some accidental events like Raghu forgetting to switch off the kitchen gas stove, makes Vani even more suspicious and she comes to a conclusion that Raghu is indeed attempting to murder her and make it look like an accident.

Vani meets Abhilasha secretly, where Abhilasha explains that Raghu was married earlier to a woman named Geetha (Anjana). Raghu murdered his wife Geetha and made it look like an accident and that just a few days before that, he had taken out a large life insurance policy in the name of Geetha. Vani is now convinced that Raghu murdered his first wife Geetha to cash the insurance money. Vani moves out of Raghu's home, despite Raghu pleading with her that Abhilasha is mentally ill and has made all this stuff up.

Vani seeks refuge in Abhilasha's house. In the dead of the night, Vani is awakened by strange sounds coming from the other end of the house. She decides to investigate and goes into Abhilasha's room, but she is not to be found. She goes around the house which is a very big mansion. She enters a secret door leading to dirty and unkempt room filled with dust and cobwebs and looking like it has not been used for many years. She goes deep into the mansions' maze of rooms and discovers Abhilasha throwing red paint on a large drawing canvas and stabbing the canvas with a knife like a demented person. Abhilasha spots Vani sneaking around and comes after her with the knife to kill her.

In the meanwhile, Raghu doubts that Abhilasha might have tricked Vani into going to her house and knowing Abhilasha's mental condition, he goes to her house and saves Vani before Abhilasha stabs her. In the fight, Abhilasha dies and Vani is saved.

In the end it is revealed that Raghu who was married to his first wife Geetha used to be a tenant in one of the out houses owned by Abhilasha's father. Abhilasha being mentally ill used to make up stories that Raghu beats Geetha even though they both are leading a happy life. The accident which occurred was indeed an accident and Raghu had nothing to with it. The accident was caused by a faulty gas stove which exploded that ended Geetha's life. Vani is now aware of the truth, she goes back to Raghu's home and they live a happy life.

== Cast ==
- Anant Nag as Raghu
- Vinaya Prasad as Vani
- Anjana as Geetha
- Mukhyamantri Chandru as Kanthi
- Sarika as Revathi
- Abhilasha
- Mandeep Roy as Vishwanath
- Nanjundaiah as landlord
- Krishne Gowda as Revathi's husband
- Prathap

== Soundtrack ==
Aathanka

Soundtrack album by Hamsalekha
- Genre: Feature film soundtrack
- Label: Lahari Music

Hamsalekha composed the film background score and its soundtrack, the lyrics for which was written by K. S. Narasimhaswamy and Doddarange Gowda. The soundtrack album consists of five tracks.

Track listing
No.	Title	Lyrics	Singer(s)	Length
1.	"Hatthu Varushada Hinde"	K. S. Narasimhaswamy	K. S. Chithra
2.	"Anuragada Hakki"	Doddarange Gowda	S. Janaki
3.	"Eko Eno Ee Bhaya"	Doddarange Gowda	S. Janaki
4.	"Hatthu Varushada Hinde"	K. S. Narasimhaswamy	S. Janaki
5.	"Preethi Swapna"	Doddarange Gowda	S. Janaki

== Awards ==
Karnataka State Film Awards 1992-93

- Second Best Film
- Best Actress — Vinaya Prasad
- Best Story — S. Surendranath
- Best Screenplay — S. Surendranath
- Best Cinematographer — Johny Lal
- Best Editor — K. Narasaiah

== See also ==
- Mental illness in film
