= Aadi Velli =

- Poster
- Directed by: Rama Narayanan
- Written by: G. K. (dialogues)
- Story by: Rama Narayanan
- Produced by: N. Radha
- Starring: Seetha; Nizhalgal Ravi
- Cinematography: N. K. Viswanathan
- Edited by: Rajkeerthi
- Music by: Shankar–Ganesh
- Production company: Sri Thenandal Films
- Release date: 2 February 1990
- Running time: 160 minutes
- Country: India
- Language: Tamil

Aadi Velli (transl. Aadi Friday) is a 1990 Indian Tamil-language devotional film directed by Rama Narayanan and produced by N. Radha, starring Seetha and Nizhalgal Ravi. It was released on 2 February 1990. The film was remade in Kannada as Durgasthami.

== Plot ==
The story revolves around a beautiful village girl Seetha who is living with an elephant and a cobra who obey only to her. She is very much attracted and attached to the local village deity and she lives in nearby area around the temple. Then comes the villain Nizhalgal Ravi who wants to abduct all the wealth of the temple. He meets Seetha and was attracted to her at the first sight. He befriends her and makes her to love him too under circumstances but always disliked by the elephant and cobra. Very soon Seetha realises that her husband is a thief and shocked. Meanwhile, Nizhalgal Ravi along with his computer genius friend plots several attempts to plunder the jewels and precious items from the temple but goes all in vain, saved by the duo. In the climax, the genius friend builds a devil creature called [King Kattari] using his computer to loot the temple. The cobra, by the deity's blessing takes the size of huge anaconda and charges against King Kattari. Meanwhile, during the fight Nizhalgal Ravi realises his friend plans to loot all properties himself and kill him. Finally the cobra bites the devil and kills him, which in turn kills the computer genius through electro-envenomation.

== Cast ==
- Seetha
- Nizhalgal Ravi
- Chandrasekhar
- Aruna
- Vennira Aadai Moorthy
- Y. Vijaya
- Ra. Sankaran
- Pradeep Shakti
- Kullamani

== Soundtrack ==
Soundtrack was composed by Shankar–Ganesh Lyrics by Vaali and Tha. Narayanan.

Track	Singer(s)	Lyrics
"Vanna Vizhiyazhagi"	K. S. Chithra	Vaali
"Vellikizhamai Ramasaamy"	Vani Jairam	Vaali
"Gum Gum Guma"	Mano, S. P. Sailaja	Vaali
"Sonnapetcha Kekkanum"	M. S. Rajeswari	Vaali
"Aayi Mahamayi"	S. P. Sailaja	Vaali
"Bhama Thallipoma"	Mano, S. P. Sailaja	Tha. Narayanan

== Box office ==
Aadi Velli, made on a budget of ₹2.5 million (equivalent to ₹27 million or US$280,000 in 2026), made a profit of ₹20 million (equivalent to ₹210 million or US$2.2 million in 2026).
