= Sivaranjani (film) =

- Directed by: Dasari Narayana Rao
- Written by: Dasari Narayana Rao
- Produced by: Dasari Padma
- Starring: Jayasudha; Hari Prasad; Mohan Babu
- Cinematography: K. S. Mani
- Edited by: K. Balu
- Music by: Pasupuleti Ramesh Naidu
- Release date: 1978
- Country: India
- Language: Telugu

Sivaranjani is 1978 Indian Telugu-language musical drama film written and directed by Dasari Narayana Rao. The film stars Jayasudha, Hari Prasad, and Mohan Babu. The film is about a village girl Sivaranjani who goes on to become a famous film actress. It was remade in Tamil as Natchathiram in 1980.

== Plot ==
The film is about a village girl Sivaranjani (Jayasudha), who goes on to become a famous film actress. A small town man, Hari Prasad forms her fan club and starts admiring her. Sivaranjani starts finding her true love in this man. She gives up her career as a film actress, escapes the trauma of limelight and wants to settle down with Hari Prasad. However, Nirmallamma and Subhashini approach Jayasudha to convince her not to marry the boy. Sivaranjani sacrifices her life so that the boy and Subhashini can marry.

== Cast ==
- Jayasudha as Sivaranjani
- Hari Prasad as Hari Prasad
- Mohan Babu as Mohan
- Allu Ramalingaiah
- Nirmalamma
- Subhashini
- Gokina Rama Rao as Sivaranjani's brother
- K. V. Chalam
- Murali Mohan
- Savitri as herself (guest appearance)

== Soundtrack ==
Music by Pasupuleti Ramesh Naidu. The lead violin tune of "Joru Meedunnave Tummeda Nee Joru Evari Kosame Tummeda?" was played by Y. N. Sharma, father of music director Mani Sharma. Shankar–Ganesh reused the song "Abhinava Thaaravo Naa Abhimana Thaaravo" as "Aval Oru Menagai" which was sung by S. P. Balasubrahmanyam himself for Natchathiram.

- "Abhinava Thaaravo Naa Abhimana Thaaravo" (Lyrics: C. Narayana Reddy; Singer: S. P. Balasubrahmanyam)
- "Chandamama Vacchaadamma Tongi Tongi Ninu Choochaa – P. Susheela"
- "Joru Meedunnave Thummeda, Nee Joru Evari Kosame Thummeda – P. Susheela"
- "Maapalle Vadalaku Krishnamurthi Nuvvu Konte Panulakochava" (Lyrics : Dasam Gopala Krishna); singers:S. P. Balasubrahmanyam, S.P. Sailaja
- "Mee Ammavaadu Naa Kosam Eeniuntadu"
- "Navami Naati Vennela Nenu Dasami Naati Jaabili Neevu" (Singers: S. P. Balasubrahmanyam and P. Susheela)
- "Paalakollu Santalona Paapayammo Paapayamma" (Singers: S. P. Balasubrahmanyam and P. Susheela)
