= Natchathiram =

- Poster
- Directed by: Dasari Narayana Rao
- Screenplay by: Dasari Narayana Rao; R. K. Dharmaraj (dialogue)
- Story by: Dasari Narayana Rao
- Produced by: Girija Pakkirisamy; K. S. Narashiman
- Starring: Sripriya; Hari Prasad; Mohan Babu
- Cinematography: K. S. Mani
- Edited by: Vellaisamy
- Music by: Shankar–Ganesh
- Production company: Sreesanmundeeswari
- Release date: 12 April 1980
- Country: India
- Language: Tamil

Natchathiram (transl. Star) is a 1980 Indian Tamil-language film written and directed by Dasari Narayana Rao and starring Sripriya. It is a remake of the 1978 Telugu film Sivaranjani. The film also has Hari Prasad as Sripriya's fan and Mohan Babu as Sripriya's cunning husband. Sivaji Ganesan, Rajinikanth, Kamal Haasan, Savithri, K. R. Vijaya, Manjula Vijayakumar, Srividya and Pushpalatha played guest roles. It was released on 12 April 1980.

== Plot ==
A movie buff befriends a popular actress and believes that she is leading a happy life, until one day he sees an unknown man making an attempt on her life.

== Cast ==
- Sripriya as Sivaranjani
- Mohan Babu
- Hari Prasad as Kannan
- Sivachandran
- Manorama
- Jayamalini
- Subhashini

Guest appearances

- Sivaji Ganesan
- Rajinikanth
- Kamal Haasan
- Nagesh
- Prabha
- Savitri
- Radha
- K. R. Vijaya
- Manjula
- Srividya
- Pushpalatha

== Soundtrack ==
The soundtrack was composed by Shankar–Ganesh.

Track listing
No.	Title	Lyrics	Singer(s)	Length
1.	"Ponnangkanni"	Kannadasan	S. P. Balasubrahmanyam, P. Susheela
2.	"Vaanam Ingay"	Pulamaipithan	P. Jayachandran, S. Janaki
3.	"Aval Oru Menakai"	Kannadasan	S. P. Balasubrahmanyam
4.	"Vaigai Nathiyil Oru"		S. Janaki

== Reception ==
Kanthan of Kalki praised Sripriya's acting, panned Nagesh's comedy and felt the film offered nothing new and concluded Natchathiram (star) did not glitter. Anna wrote the director could have focused more on screenplay and could have avoided dragging scenes unnecessarily.
