= Chakravarthy (1987 film) =

- Theatrical poster
- Directed by: Ravi Raja Pinisetty
- Written by: Ganesh Patro
- Screenplay by: Ravi Raja Pinisetty
- Produced by: K. Venkateswara Rao
- Starring: Chiranjeevi; Mohan Babu; Bhanupriya; Ramya Krishna
- Cinematography: Lok Singh
- Edited by: Vellaiswamy
- Music by: Chakravarthy
- Release date: 4 June 1987
- Running time: 136 minutes
- Country: India
- Language: Telugu

Chakravarthy is a 1987 Indian Telugu-language film directed by Ravi Raja Pinisetty and produced by K. Venkateswara Rao under Vasantha Arts Productions. Starring Chiranjeevi, Mohan Babu, Bhanupriya and Ramya Krishna, the film is a remake of the Tamil film Gnana Oli (1972). The film was released on 4 June 1987, with music composed by Chakravarthy.

== Plot ==
The plot follows Anji (Chiranjeevi), who shares a deep bond with his sister Lakshmi (Ramya Krishna), and respects his guru, Swamiji (J. V. Somayajulu), whose word is considered law. Anji's childhood friend Mohan (Mohan Babu) is a police inspector. Swamiji wishes to marry Lakshmi to Mohan, but she is in love with Prem Babu. When Anji approaches Prem Babu to arrange the marriage, he mocks Anji, leading to a confrontation. Prem Babu later dies, and Anji is wrongfully accused of the murder by Mohan. Anji is arrested and imprisoned but is later released on Swamiji's request due to his deteriorating health. Swamiji urges Mohan to reform Anji, but Anji escapes and is presumed dead. He later returns as a wealthy man, now known as Chakravarthy, determined to improve the village as Swamiji wished.

As the story unfolds, Chakravarthy and Mohan cross paths again, with Mohan suspecting Chakravarthy's true identity. Eventually, they join forces to expose the real antagonist, the village president, who was responsible for the troubles in Anji's life. In the end, the two friends reconcile, with Chakravarthy marrying Rani, and Mohan marrying Lakshmi.

== Cast ==
- Chiranjeevi as Anji/Chakravarthy
- Mohan Babu as Mohan Rao
- Bhanupriya as Rani
- Ramya Krishna as Lakshmi
- J. V. Somayajulu as Swamiji
- Brahmanandam
- Allu Ramalingiah
- Kaikala Satyanarayana as Bhadrachalam
- Suthi Velu as Simhachalam
- Manik Irani as Goon from Bombay
- Ranganath as Superintendent of Police
- Sakshi Ranga Rao as Avatharam
- Shivanandakumar as Simha Reddy
- Narra Venkateswara Rao
- Juttu Narasimham
- Prathapachandran
- Hari Prasad
- Chilakaradha
- Mamatha

== Production ==
Chakravarthy was produced by Dr. K. Venkateswara Rao, Chiranjeevi’s co-brother, under the banner of Vasantha Arts Productions. It is a remake of the Tamil film Gnana Oli (1972), which starred Sivaji Ganesan. The film's screenplay, written by the director Ravi Raja Pinisetty, is based on a story by Vietnam Veedu Sundaram, with modifications by Ganesh Patro. While the original focused on the relationship between a father and daughter, the Telugu adaptation shifted the narrative to centre around the bond between a brother and his sister.

The film features an ensemble cast that includes J. V. Somayajulu, Kaikala Satyanarayana, Allu Ramalingaiah, Suthi Velu, Ranganath, Sakshi Ranga Rao, Sudhakar, and Brahmanandam.

== Music ==
Music composed by K. Chakravarthy was released through Lahari Music. Lyrics were written by Veturi and Sirivennela Seetharama Sastry.

Track list
No.	Title	Lyrics	Singer(s)	Length
1.	"Oopiri Nindaa Saahasame"	Veturi	S. P. Balasubrahmanyam	4:21
2.	"Vannelaraani Kinnerasaani"	Sirivennela Seetharama Sastry	S. P. Balasubrahmanyam, S. Janaki	4:26
3.	"Sanditlo Chikkindammaa Jaabili"	Veturi	S. P. Balasubrahmanyam, P. Susheela	4:12
4.	"Mokkajonna Thotakaada"	Veturi	S. P. Balasubrahmanyam, S. Janaki	4:18
5.	"Yeru Jola Paadenayya Saamii"	Veturi	S. P. Balasubrahmanyam	4:36
6.	"Mabbulu Vidivadipoye"	Veturi	S. P. Balasubrahmanyam, P. Susheela	4:27
7.	"Yeru Daatipovaddayyaa Saamii"	Veturi	S. P. Balasubrahmanyam	1:01
Total length:				27:21
