= Marikozhundhu =

- Directed by: Pudhiyavan
- Written by: Pudhiyavan
- Produced by: P. Mahendar; T. M. N. Karunanidhi
- Starring: Ramesh Aravind; Aishwarya
- Cinematography: Viswanatha Rai
- Edited by: K. R. Krishnan
- Music by: Deva
- Production company: A. K. M. Creations
- Release date: 3 May 1991
- Running time: 120 minutes
- Country: India
- Language: Tamil

Marikozhundhu (transl. Artemisia pallens) is a 1991 Indian Tamil-language drama film directed by Pudhiyavan, an erstwhile assistant of Bharathiraja. The film stars Ramesh Aravind and Aishwarya, with Manorama, Vinu Chakravarthy, Nassar, Goundamani and Senthil playing supporting roles. The film is one of the few Tamil films that questioned the glamour surrounding fairness. It was released on 3 May 1991, and was a box office failure.

== Plot ==
The film starts with the modern girl Chithra and her father Seenu getting off the train in a small village called Marikozhundhupatti. The villagers receive them with a lot of respect because of her late mother Marikozhundhu, Chithra is surprised by the welcome. Chithra's father finally tells what happened in the past.

Marikozhundhu lived a precarious life with her grandmother. Marikozhundhu was a kind-hearted person but she was not a good-looking woman, her dream was to get married as soon as possible. Seenu was a college student who lived with his mother in the city, for the holiday he always went to his father's village. There, Seenu was intrigued by the stubborn Marikozhundhu and he smiled each time he saw her, Marikozhundhu thought he loved her. Afterwards, the two had a sexual intercourse in the fields. At the village court, the elders arranged their marriage the next day. The day of the marriage, Marikozhundhu realized that Seenu seemed to dislike her and stopped the marriage. Seenu was in fact in love with his childhood sweetheart Uma. Seenu's father wanted his son to marry Uma, but his mother wanted her son to marry Marikozhundhu. Shortly after, Marikozhundhu became pregnant and her grandmother died.

One year later, Marikozhundhu gave birth to a baby girl. Seenu's father begged her to leave the village so that his son could marry Uma without any remorse. Marikozhundhu and her baby girl left the village, she then listened that the local factory owner had dumped toxic mercury waste from his factory into the village water. The village was close to celebrate a water ceremony, so Marikozhundhu tried to stop it but nobody believed her. Marikozhundhu had no choice than to drink the contaminated water thus she died. Seenu tied the thaali around her neck (synonym of marriage) just before she died.

Chithra breaks into tears after hearing the flashback, and she feels very proud of her late mother.

== Cast ==
- Ramesh Aravind as Seenu
- Aishwarya as Marikozhundhu and Chithra
- Manorama as Seenu's mother
- Vinu Chakravarthy as Seenu's father
- Nassar
- Goundamani as a building constructor
- Senthil as the building constructor's assistant
- Radhabhai as Marikozhundhu's grandmother
- Anjana as Uma
- M. R. Krishnamurthy as Accountant
- Bhavani as Ezhuthu
- Vasu as Munusamy
- Joker Thulasi
- Gnanavel as Nattamai
- V. P. Rajan
- Poornima
- Shobana
- Supraja
- Naveena
- Vijay Ganesh

== Soundtrack ==
The soundtrack was composed by Deva.

Song	Singer(s)	Lyrics	Duration
"Kannadhasane Kannadhasane"	S. P. Balasubrahmanyam, K. S. Chithra	Kamakodiyan	4:36
"Yea Paatudhan"	S. Janaki	Kamakodiyan	4:37
"Enakenna Korachal"	S. P. Sailaja	Vaali	2:42
"Poonkuyil Nitham"	K. S. Chithra	Vaali	4:15
"Aalamarama Aalamarama"	Deva	Vaali	1:13
"Theene Theraviyame"	K. S. Chithra	Vaali	1:02
"Thoda Thoda"	S. P. Balasubrahmanyam, K. S. Chithra	Kamakodiyan	5:02
"Andradam En Manam"	S. P. Balasubrahmanyam	Vaali	4:52
"Thulluvadho Elamai"	S. Janaki	Vaali	0:41
