= Shabash Vikram =

- Directed by: Renuka Sharma
- Written by: Chi. Udayashankar (dialogues)
- Screenplay by: M. D. Sundar
- Story by: M. D. Sundar
- Produced by: S. V. Srikanth
- Starring: Ambareesh; Urvashi; Sathyaraj
- Cinematography: S. V. Srikanth
- Edited by: D. Venkataratnam
- Music by: G. K. Venkatesh
- Release date: 23 February 1985
- Running time: 142 min
- Country: India
- Language: Kannada

Shabash Vikram (transl. Bravo Vikram) is a 1985 Indian Kannada-language masala film. The film features Ambareesh and Urvashi in the lead roles with Sathyaraj. This is first and only movie for Tamil actor Sathyaraj in Kannada. It was dubbed in Tamil as Kadamai Enathu Udamai. The movie is based on Jack Higgins' 1962 novel Hell Is Too Crowded.

== Cast ==
- Ambareesh as Vikram
- Urvashi as Gayathri
- Sathyaraj as 'Tyre King' Suman
- Silk Smitha
- Uma Shivakumar
- M. N. Lakshmi Devi
- Vedapradha
- Kamala Murthy
- Jayasheela
- Mangala
- Devikarani
- Meenakshi
- Rani
- Mala
- T. N. Balakrishna
- Thoogudeepa Srinivas
- Dinesh
- Umesh
- Sudheer
- Shivaprakash
- Hanumanthachar
