= Shabarimale Swamy Ayyappa =

- Directed by: Renuka Sharma
- Written by: Sreekumaran Thampi (Malayalam dialogues)
- Produced by: Subramaniam Kumar; V. Swaminathan
- Starring: Srinivasa Murthy; Geetha; Master Sanjay
- Cinematography: S. V. Sreekanth
- Edited by: B. V. Krishnan; V. M. Victor
- Music by: K. V. Mahadevan
- Production company: VSN Productions
- Distributed by: VSN Productions
- Release date: 18 March 1990
- Country: India
- Language: Kannada

Shabarimale Swamy Ayyappa is a 1990 Indian Kannada-language film, directed by Renuka Sharma and produced by Subramaniam Kumar and V. Swaminathan. The film stars Srinivasa Murthy, Geetha and Master Sanjay. The film has musical score by K. V. Mahadevan. The film was dubbed in Malayalam under same title and in Tamil as Manikandan.

== Cast ==
- Master Sanjay as Manikanta, Shri Swamy Ayyappa
- Srinivasa Murthy as King of Pandalam
- Geetha as queen of King of Pandalam
- Sri Lalitha as Demoness Mahishi
- Sridhar as Shiva
- Sudharani as Parvathi
- Ramesh Bhat as Minister
- Shivakumar as Lord Indra
- M. S. Umesh as Narada
- Rajanand as Manikanta's Guru
- Master Manjunath
- T. N. Balakrishna
- Anjana as Mohini
- Master Manjunath as Sarvotham, the son of Manikanta's Guru.

== Soundtrack ==
The music was composed by K. V. Mahadevan.

The following are the list of songs in the Kannada version. The lyrics were written by Chi. Udayashankar and Vijaya Narasimha.

No.	Song	Singers	Lyrics	Length (m:ss)
1	"Devare Neenu Nijavappa"	B. R. Chaya		
2	"Ganapathiye"	B. R. Chaya		
3	"Harivaraasanam"	K. J. Yesudas, Chorus		
4	"Poornachandira Banda"	Manjula Gururaj		
5	"Shankara Shashidhara"	S. P. Balasubrahmanyam, Chorus		
6	"Sri Hari Maayeya Avathara"	S. P. Balasubrahmanyam		
7	"Swami Ayyappa"	K. J. Yesudas		
8	"Swami Ayyappa" (group)	S. P. Balasubrahmanyam, Chorus		

The following are the list of songs in the Malayalam dubbed version. The lyrics were written by Sreekumaran Thampi and A. Janaki Amma.

No.	Song	Singers	Lyrics	Length (m:ss)
1	"Daivam Neeye Ayyappa"	B. R. Chaya	Sreekumaran Thampi	
2	"Ganapathiye"	B. R. Chaya	Sreekumaran Thampi	
3	"Harivaraasanam"	K. J. Yesudas, Chorus	A. Janaki Amma	
4	"Poorna Chandran Vannu"	Manjula Gururaj	Sreekumaran Thampi	
5	"Shankara Shashidhara"	S. P. Balasubrahmanyam, Chorus	Sreekumaran Thampi	
6	"Sree Hari Rakshakan"	S. P. Balasubrahmanyam, K. J. Yesudas Chorus	Sreekumaran Thampi	
7	"Swami Ayyappa"	K. J. Yesudas	Sreekumaran Thampi	
8	"Swami Ayyappa" (group)	S. P. Balasubrahmanyam, Chorus	Sreekumaran Thampi	
