= Mallu Vetti Minor =

- Poster
- Directed by: Manobala
- Written by: P. Kalaimani
- Produced by: P. Kalaimani
- Starring: Sathyaraj; Shobana; Seetha
- Cinematography: B. R. Vijayalakshmi
- Edited by: M. N. Raja
- Music by: Ilaiyaraaja
- Production company: Everest Films
- Release date: 17 October 1990
- Running time: 135 minutes
- Country: India
- Language: Tamil

Mallu Vetti Minor (transl. Philanderer) is a 1990 Indian Tamil-language masala film directed by Manobala, produced and written by P. Kalaimani. The film stars Sathyaraj, Seetha and Shobana. It was released on 17 October 1990. The film was remade in Telugu as Minor Raja (1990) and in Kannada as Vamshakobba (2002).

== Plot ==
The story begins with Santhana Lakshmi being released from the jail and remembering her past.

Rassappa Gounder, also known as Mallu Vetti Minor, was a bachelor and rich man who spent his time in the brothels like his father Marappa Gounder. Santhana Lakshmi and Rassappa fell in love. Rassappa Gounder and President were in a feud for several years. In a misunderstanding, Rassappa Gounder had to marry Parimala. A few years later, Rassappa Gounder became the perfect husband and had a son. While Santhana Lakshmi was still unmarried and teased Rassappa Gounder whenever she got the opportunity. One day, that was the last straw so the angry Rassappa Gounder raped Santhana Lakshmi. The rest of story is what happens to Rassappa Gounder, Parimala and Santhana Lakshmi.

== Cast ==
- Sathyaraj as Rassappa Gounder and Marappa Gounder
- Shobana as Santhana Lakshmi
- Seetha as Parimala
- Vinu Chakravarthy as President
- Vennira Aadai Moorthy
- Senthil
- Chinni Jayanth
- Thyagu as Pattabhi
- MRK as Paramasivam
- Kokila as Pattabhi's wife
- Kutty Padmini as Paramasivam's wife
- Master Rajesh as Rassappa Gounder's son
- T. K. S. Chandran
- Idichapuli Selvaraj
- Sivaraman as marriage broker
- Gandhimathi
- S. N. Lakshmi
- Bayilvan Ranganathan
- Periya Karuppu Thevar
- Sakthivel
- Thalapathi Dinesh

== Soundtrack ==
The soundtrack was composed by Ilaiyaraaja. The song "Kaathirundha Malli" is set in Amritavarshini raga, and "Manasukkulle" is set to Harikambhoji, and "Chinna Mani" is set in Charukesi.

Song	Singer(s)	Lyrics	Length
"Adi Matthalam"	Malaysia Vasudevan, Sunanda, K. S. Chithra	Piraisoodan	4:33
"Chinna Mani"	K. J. Yesudas, Uma Ramanan, K. S. Chithra	Pulamaipithan	4:38
"Jalakku Jalakku"	Mano, K. S. Chithra	Pulamaipithan	4:29
"Kaathiruntha Malli Malli"	P. Susheela	Gangai Amaran	4:39
"Manasukkulle"	Arunmozhi, S. Janaki	Gangai Amaran	4:45
"Unna Paartha"	Malaysia Vasudevan, Uma Ramanan	Gangai Amaran	4:33

== Release and reception ==
Mallu Vetti Minor was released on 17 October 1990, Diwali day. C. R. K. of Kalki called the performances of the lead actors and the music as positive points.

== Bibliography ==
- Sundararaman (2007) [2005]. Raga Chintamani: A Guide to Carnatic Ragas Through Tamil Film Music (2nd ed.). Pichhamal Chintamani. OCLC 295034757.
