= Megha Mandara =

- Directed by: K.V.Jayaram
- Written by: H. Girijamma
- Screenplay by: K. V. Jayaram
- Based on: Megha Mandara (novel)
- Produced by: Meenakshi Jayaram
- Starring: Ambareesh; Malashri; Anjana; Jaggesh
- Cinematography: Mutthuraj
- Edited by: Rajashekar Reddy
- Music by: S. P. Venkatesh
- Production company: Jayadurga Productions
- Release date: 1992
- Running time: 141 minutes
- Country: India
- Language: Kannada

Megha Mandara is a 1992 Indian Kannada-language romance film directed by K. V. Jayaram and produced by Meenakshi Jayaram. The film is based on the novel of the same name written by H. Girijamma. The film stars Ambareesh, Malashri and Anjana.

The film's music was composed by S. P. Venkatesh and the audio was launched on the Sangeetha banner.

== Cast ==
- Ambareesh as Megharaj
- Malashri as Mandara, Megharaj's wife
- Anjana
- Jaggesh as Shivaranjan
- K. S. Ashwath as Belliappa, Mandara's father
- Lokanath
- Rekha Das
- M. S. Umesh as Chengappa
- Shobha Raghavendra as Tanuja, Belliappa's wife
- Dingri Nagaraj
- Mysore Lokesh
- Sunandha
- Shankar Bhat
- Baby Vindhya

== Soundtrack ==
The music of the film was composed by S. P. Venkatesh with lyrics by Prof.Doddarange Gowda.

Track listing
No.	Title	Lyrics	Singer(s)	Length
1.	"Asha Gopura"	Doddarange Gowda	S. P. Balasubrahmanyam	5:41
2.	"Nanna Mandara"	Doddarange Gowda	S. P. Balasubrahmanyam, K. S. Chithra	5:50
3.	"Thayi Kaanada"	Doddarange Gowda	Manjula Gururaj	5:05
4.	"Daddy Preethi"	Doddarange Gowda	S. P. Balasubrahmanyam, K. S. Chithra	3:49
5.	"Megha Megha"	Doddarange Gowda	K. S. Chithra	5:47
6.	"Mandara Ee Megha"	Doddarange Gowda	S. P. Balasubrahmanyam	5:51
