= Neetho Cheppalani =

2002 Indian Telugu-language film

- Directed by: B. Satyanaidu
- Written by: B. Satyanaidu
- Dialogue by: Marudhuri Raja
- Produced by: G. Peddi Reddy; K. Girija Kumari; M. Sudhakar Reddy (presenter)
- Starring: Akash; Anupriya
- Cinematography: Jayaram
- Music by: Koti
- Production company: Sri Srinivasa Sai films
- Release date: 8 March 2002
- Country: India
- Language: Telugu

Neetho Cheppalani (transl. To talk with you) is a 2002 Indian Telugu-language romantic drama film directed by B. Satyanaidu and starring Akash and newcomer Anupriya.

== Plot ==
Friends Balu and Aishwarya are in love but are unable to express their love towards each other in words. Balu is engaged to Ramya. How Balu and Aisharya reunite forms the rest of the story.

== Cast ==
- Akash as Balu
- Anupriya as Aishwarya
- Ashita as Ramya
- M. S. Narayana as Balu's grandfather
- Giri Babu as Balu's father
- Surya as Surya
- Sudhakar
- Krishnaveni
- Telangana Shakuntala
- Brahmanandam
- Jeeva
- Hari Prasad as Aishwarya's father
- Tirupathi Prakash
- Raghu Babu

== Soundtrack ==
The music is composed by Koti. The song "Meghala Aakashame" is based on "Jeeta Tha Jiske Liye" from Dilwale (1994). A ballad song was filmed with Giribabu, M. S. Narayana, Sudhakar, Krishnaveni, and Telangana Sakunthala.

Track listing
No.	Title	Lyrics	Singer(s)	Length
1.	"Yemo Yemaindo"	Shiva Ganesh	Sunitha Upadrashta, Sriram Prabhu	4:38
2.	"Prema Koraku Jeevinchu"	B. Satya Naidu	Koti, Karthik	4:25
3.	"Oh! Missu! Oh! Vacchindi"	Bhuvana Chandra	Tippu, Gopika Poornima	4:33
4.	"Ammaye Orakanta"	Sahithi	Jayachandran, Srivardhini	5:05
5.	"Chamakkuro"	Pothula Ravi Kiran	Raghu Kunche, Ganga	4:27
6.	"Meghala Aakashame"	Pothula Ravi Kiran	Sandeep, Ganga	4:58
Total length:				28:06

== Reception ==
A critic from Idlebrain.com rated the film one out of five stars and wrote that "This film is one of the best examples of bad direction and screenplay in the recent films I have seen. The screenplay of the film makes you squirm with grudge in your seat. The direction is very amateurish". A critic from The Hindu wrote that "Akash has a lot of improving to do in acting. The dubbing is equally poor. Anupriya is better, but looks older than Akash. The talent of quite a few senior artistes like Giribabu, Brahmanandam, Sudhakar, M.S. Narayana is wasted. Music by Koti is like a remix of vintage tunes". A critic from Full Hyderabad wrote that "Oh well, cheppalani vundaa? Vaddhu babu! (transl. Oh well, is there anything to say? No dude!)"
