= Bangarada Kalasha =

- Directed by: H. R. Bhargava
- Written by: N. T. Jayaram Reddy
- Screenplay by: H. R. Bhargava
- Produced by: S. Shankar
- Starring: Vishnuvardhan; Sithara; Anjana; Dheerendra Gopal
- Cinematography: D. V. Rajaram
- Edited by: Nagesh Yadav
- Music by: Rajan–Nagendra
- Production company: Sri Shankari Productions
- Release date: 20 April 1995
- Country: India
- Language: Kannada

Bangarada Kalasha (Kannada: ಬಂಗಾರದ ಕಳಶ) is a 1995 Indian Kannada film, directed by H. R. Bhargava and produced by S. Shankar. The film stars Vishnuvardhan, Sithara, Anjana and Dheerendra Gopal in the lead roles. The film has musical score by Rajan–Nagendra.

== Cast ==
- Vishnuvardhan as Nagaraja
- Sithara as Gowri
- Anjana
- Pavithra Lokesh
- B. V. Radha
- Ramesh Bhat as Mukunda
- Shivaram
- Dheerendra Gopal
- Rajanand
- Sudheer
- Shobhraj
- Tennis Krishna as Narahari
- Janaki
- Lakshmi Bhat
- Bhavyashree Rai
- B. Jaya

Bangarada Kalasha

Soundtrack album by Rajan–Nagendra
- Released: 1995
- Genre: Feature film soundtrack
- Length: 29:33
- Label: Akash Audio

== Music ==
- "Entha Hennannu Kande" – S. P. Balasubrahmanyam, K. S. Chithra
- "Nagu Nagutho Naliyo" – S. P. Balasubrahmanyam, K. S. Chithra
- "Nammoora Kerigalalli" – S. P. Balasubrahmanyam, K. S. Chithra
- "Sihimuthu Sihimuthu" – S. P. Balasubrahmanyam, K. S. Chithra
- "Samsaaravendare" – S. P. Balasubrahmanyam, Sangeetha Katti, Manjula Gururaj
- "Aha Anno Kelasa" – S. P. Balasubrahmanyam
