= En Purushanthaan Enakku Mattumthaan =

- Poster
- Directed by: Manobala
- Written by: P. Kalaimani
- Produced by: V. N. J. Manivannan
- Starring: Vijayakanth; Suhasini; Rekha
- Cinematography: B. R. Vijayalakshmi
- Edited by: M. N. Raja
- Music by: Ilaiyaraaja
- Production company: Manthralaya Cine Creations
- Release date: 3 February 1989
- Running time: 135 minutes
- Country: India
- Language: Tamil

En Purushanthaan Enakku Mattumthaan (transl. My husband is mine alone) is a 1989 Indian Tamil-language drama film, directed by Manobala and written by P. Kalaimani. The film stars Vijayakanth, Suhasini and Rekha. It was released on 3 February 1989. The film was remade in Hindi as Mera Pati Sirf Mera Hai (1990) by the same director. It was also remade in Telugu as Naa Mogudu Naake Sontham (1989) and in Kannada as Hatamari Hennu Kiladi Gandu (1992). The title of the song is derived from the film Gopurangal Saivathillai (1982).

== Plot ==
Vatsala lives a wealthy lifestyle with her husband Marudhu, who works for her father, and a daughter Pinky. Vatsala and Marudhu do not get along well and Vatsala suspects that Marudhu is having an affair. Her suspicious nature gets a boost when a woman named Sharadha moves into a house next door. Vatsala starts vile rumours about Sharadha having an affair with Marudhu. As a result of these rumours, no one is willing to marry Sharadha, she is mocked by everyone in the community and even loses her bank job. Sharadha decides to teach Vatsala a lesson by moving her belongings into her house, claiming that she is indeed Marudhu's mistress. The surprising thing is that Marudhu agrees to this arrangement and permits her to live with them. Unable to assert herself, Vatsala leaves the house and goes to live with her parents.

Things go well with Sharadha, until one day when Marudhu's daughter goes missing. Sharadha hectically attempts to locate Pinky but in vain. Then the police arrive to arrest Sharadha on the charge of kidnapping Pinky and possibly killing her. The police indicate that they can prove that Sharadha did indeed kidnap Pinky as she has a motive for continuing to live with Marudhu as his mistress and wanted Pinky out of the way. It was Vatsala's plan to insult Sharadha further by giving away her daughter to Nassar who wants to take revenge on Sharadha as he lost his bank job because of her. Marudhu saves his daughter Pinky and gets Nassar arrested.

When Vatsala visits the temple, she is completely shocked to see the wedding arrangements between Marudhu and Sharadha. She realises the error and her mistakes and apologises for her behaviour. Marudhu who is happy with the plan reveals that the marriage is for the temple deity and not their marriage. Marudhu and Vatsala get united while Sharadha leaves for another town.

== Cast ==
- Vijayakanth as Marudhu
- Suhasini as Saradha
- Rekha as Vatsala
- Janagaraj as Lawyer
- V. K. Ramasamy as Thayagaiah
- Vennira Aadai Moorthy as Marudhu's neighbour
- Nassar as Bank employee
- Thyagu as Vatsala's brother
- LIC Narasimhan as Bank manager

== Production ==
P. Kalaimani initially announced he would direct a film titled Akka Purushan, with Vijayakanth starring, but the project did not move forward. After Manobala took over directing, it was retitled En Purushanthaan Enakku Mattumthaan.

== Soundtrack ==
The music was composed by Ilaiyaraaja. The song "Poo Mudithu" is based on Hamsadhvani raga.

Song	Singers	Lyrics	Length
"Pullai Kooda Paada"	Jayachandran	Piraisoodan	04:34
"Pattu Pudai"	S. P. Balasubrahmanyam	Ilaiyaraaja	01:19
"Manathil Ore Oru"	Susheela	Mu. Metha	04:10
"Paarthavudan"	S. P. Balasubrahmanyam	Muthulingam	00:38
"Kaathu Kaathu Ootha Kaathum"	Mano, Lalitha Sagari	Mu. Metha	04:32
"Poomudithu"	Jayachandran, Sunandha	Vaali	04:35
"Saamikaley Saamikaley"	S. P. Balasubrahmanyam	Muthulingam	04:35

== Reception ==
N. Krishnaswamy of The Indian Express wrote that the film has "contrived poignant sequences and with turns and bashups and some honeyed numbers tuned by Ilayaraja who seems to have taken special care". P. S. S. of Kalki praised the performances of cast and dialogues.
