= 1992–93 Karnataka State Film Awards =

Annual Indian film awards ceremony

The Karnataka State Film Awards 1992–93, presented by Government of Karnataka, to felicitate the best of Kannada Cinema releases in the year 1992.

== Lifetime achievement award ==
Name of Award	Awardee(s)	Awarded As
• Puttanna Kanagal Award	• Geethapriya	• Director

== Film awards ==
Name of Award	Film	Producer	Director
First Best Film	Jeevana Chaitra	Parvathamma Rajkumar	Dorai - Bhagwan
Second Best Film	Aathanka	• C. V. L. Shastry • Sharada Shastry	Om Sai Prakash
Third Best Film	Harakeya Kuri	B. V. Radha	K. S. L. Swamy

== Other awards ==
Name of Award	Film	Awardee(s)
Best Direction	Jeevana Chaitra	Dorai - Bhagwan
Best Actor	Jeevana Chaitra	Rajkumar
Best Actress	Aathanka	Vinaya Prasad
Best Supporting Actor	Harakeya Kuri	H. G. Somashekhara Rao
Best Supporting Actress	Sangya Balya	Umashree
Best Music Direction	Jeevana Chaitra	Upendra Kumar
Best Cinematography	Aathanka	Johnny Lal
Best Editing	Aathanka	K. Narasaiah
Best Sound Recording	Angaiyalli Apsare	R. Kannan
Best Story Writer	Aathanka	S. Surendranath
Best Screenplay	Aathanka	S. Surendranath
Best Dialogue Writer	Jeevana Chaitra	Chi. Udayashankar
Jury's Special Award	Bangar Patler (As Best Tulu Film)	Producer & Director: Richard Castellino
