= Yaadgaar =

Yaadgaar may refer to:

- Yaadgaar, a 1970 Indian Hindi-language film
- Yaadgaar, a 1984 Indian Hindi-language film

== See also ==
- Yaadein (disambiguation)
