= Thangachi =

- Title card
- Directed by: R. Krishnamoorthy
- Written by: Liaquat Ali Khan (dialogues)
- Screenplay by: R. Krishnamurthy
- Produced by: S. R. Arul Prakasham
- Starring: Ramki; Pallavi; Seetha
- Cinematography: R. H. Ashok
- Edited by: V. Chakrapani
- Music by: S. A. Rajkumar
- Production company: Rathna Movies
- Release date: 27 November 1987
- Running time: 136 minutes
- Country: India
- Language: Tamil

Thangachi (transl. Younger sister) is a 1987 Indian Tamil-language action drama film directed by R. Krishnamoorthy, starring Ramki, Pallavi and Seetha. It is a remake of the Telugu film Aadupaduchu (1986). The film was released on 27 November 1987.

== Plot ==
Dharmaraja is an influential man in politics that's involved in many illegal activities. Inspector Raja curtails many of his illicit businesses in the course of his investigations. Raja's only family is his younger sister, Seetha, and her contractor husband, Prakash. He also meets and falls in love with Radha. Raja arrests Das, an associate of Dharmaraja. Das is soon released on bail and remains defiant towards Raja. Dharmaraja, incensed by Raja's interference with his business, has Prakash disrupt Raja's investigations. Prakash has always been a part of Dharmaraja's team. When a sub-inspector from Raja's team follows Das, he is caught at Prakash's construction site. Dharmaraj, Prakash and Das kill him while Seetha becomes an accidental witness. Assuming that she only saw the other two, Prakash plays the concerned husband but plots to have her murdered. His plan goes awry and Seetha kills Das as he was trying to murder her. Raja must now investigate to free his sister and catch Dharmaraj.

== Cast ==
- Ramki as Inspector Raja
- Pallavi as Radha
- Seetha as Seetha
- Nizhalgal Ravi as Prakash
- Radha Ravi as Dharmaraja
- S. S. Chandran as SS
- Senthil as Azhagu
- Charle as KD
- Kallapetti Singaram as Parivallal

== Soundtrack ==
Soundtrack was composed by S. A. Rajkumar, who also wrote the lyrics.

Song	Singers
"Marutha Jilla"	S. P. Balasubrahmanyam, Sunandha
"Kathirukkum Maama"	Uma Ramanan
"Mudhal Muraiye"	S. P. Balasubrahmanyam, Sunandha
"Ye Kuruvi Poongkuruvi"	S. P. Balasubrahmanyam, S. P. Sailaja, Sunandha
"Siraiyinil Seethai"	S. P. Balasubrahmanyam, Sunandha

== Reception ==
The Indian Express wrote "Dont be fooled by the title; [..] Thangachi uses the sentimental peg only to hang a lot of things more attractive".
