= Anjana (actress) =

Indian actress

- Occupation: Actress
- Years active: 1988–1997

Anjana is an Indian actress known for her roles in Kannada cinema. She was one of the most prominent actresses during the early 1990s and appeared in more than 20 films.

== Career ==
Anjana debuted in Shabarimale Swamy Ayyappa (1990). Her breakthrough role was Ajagajantara (1991). She starred in successful films like Ondu Cinema Kathe (1992), Hatamari Hennu Kiladi Gandu (1992), Nishkarsha (1993), Aathanka (1993), and Jaana (1994). Her other notable performances include Policena Hendthi (1991), Megha Mandara (1992), Roshagara (1992), Looty Gang (1994), and Bangarada Kalasha (1995). She quit film in 1997 and last appeared in Enoondre (1997) as Dheerendra Gopal's granddaughter. She resides in Mumbai.

== Filmography ==
Year	Film	Role
1988	Rendum Rendum Anju (Tamil)	Chithra
1990	Shabarimale Swamy Ayyappa	Mohini
1990	Neti Charitra (Telugu)	Mounica
1990	Kiladi Thatha	
1990	Police Bharya (Telugu)	
1991	Ajagajantara	
1991	Policena Hendthi	
1991	Marikozhundhu (Tamil)	Uma
1991	Central Rowdy	
1991	Intlo Pilli Veedhilo puli (Telugu)	Devi
1991	Veera Dheera	
1992	Roshagara	Priya
1992	Ondu Cinema Kathe	Radha
1992	Nanna Thangi	
1992	Mysore Jaana	
1992	Megha Mandara	Sneha
1992	Hatamari Hennu Kiladi Gandu	
1993	Nishkarsha	Durga
1993	Mojina Maduve	
1993	Aathanka	
1993	Kiladigalu	Inspector Anjana
1994	Jaana	Beena
1994	Gopi Kalyana	Sharada
1994	Looti Gang	
1995	Bangarada Kalasha	
1995	Ganeshana Galate	
1996	Veera Bhadra	
1996	Thali Pooje	
1997	Enoondre	
