= Yamudiki Mogudu (1988 film) =

1988 Telugu film by Ravi Raja Pinisetty

- Poster
- Directed by: Ravi Raja Pinisetty
- Written by: Story: Dynamic Movie Makers; Screenplay: Ravi Raja Pinisetty; Dialogues: Satyanand
- Produced by: Sudhakar; Hari Prasad; G. V. Narayana Rao
- Starring: Chiranjeevi; Vijayashanti; Radha
- Cinematography: K. S. Hari
- Edited by: Vellaiswamy
- Music by: Raj–Koti
- Production company: Dynamic Movie Makers
- Distributed by: Geetha Arts
- Release date: 29 April 1988
- Running time: 155 minutes
- Country: India
- Language: Telugu

Yamudiki Mogudu (transl. Overlord to Yama) is a 1988 Indian Telugu-language fantasy film directed by Ravi Raja Pinisetty. The film stars Chiranjeevi in a dual role, alongside Vijayashanti and Radha. The supporting cast includes Kaikala Satyanarayana, Allu Ramalingaiah, Rao Gopal Rao, and Kota Srinivasa Rao. The music was composed by Raj–Koti.

Yamudiki Mogudu was produced by Chiranjeevi's friends from his film institute days—Sudhakar, Hari Prasad, and G. V. Narayana Rao on Dynamic Movie Makers banner. Released on 29 April 1988, Yamudiki Mogudu was a major success, becoming the highest-grossing Telugu film at the time of its release. The film was remade in Tamil as Athisaya Piravi (1990).

== Plot ==
Kaali is a small-town goon who uses his earnings to help his neighbourhood. He is good at heart and is loved by everyone in town. He works for Kotayya, whose rival is Gollapudi. Once, when he goes to warn Gollapudi, he meets and falls in love with Radha, Gollapudi's daughter. When they decide to marry even without Gollapudi's consent, he gets Kaali killed in an accident, and Kaali goes to Yamalokam.

There, he challenges Yama that he was brought wrongly and catches Chitragupta red-handed for cheating. To correct the mistake, Yama and Chitragupta leave for Earth to find Kaali's body so he can return to Earth. Unfortunately, Kaali's body has been cremated, and Kaali refuses to enter another body. However, Yama and Chitragupta convince him to enter the body of a person that is identical to him. Kaali refuses, taking heed of a warning by Vichitragupta. They then show him Balu in a village and tell him it is his last option.

Kaali learns that Balu was a soft-spoken and non-confrontational man who was often ill-treated by his family. Gowri (Vijayashanti) is his love interest. Balu's relatives plan to kill him on his 25th birthday as they have to hand over his property. This is when Kaali's soul is put into Balu's body, and he plays black and blue with them. However, he remembers his own life once he sees Kotayya's photo in a newspaper and returns to the city. The rest of the plot is woven around how he balances the two lives and two girls, until Yama sees his determination and willingness to save all the people he loves.

== Cast ==
- Chiranjeevi in a dual role as
  - Kaali
  - Balu
- Vijayashanti as Gowri
- Radha as Radha
- Kaikala Satyanarayana as Yamadharmaraja
- Rao Gopal Rao
- Kota Srinivasa Rao as Kotayya
- Gollapudi Maruti Rao as Gollapudi
- Allu Ramalingaiah as Chitragupta
- Prasad Babu
- Sudhakar
- Hari Prasad as Kaali's friend
- Ambika as Dancer
- Suryakantham
- Annaporna
- Y. Vijaya
- King Kong
- Juttu Narasimham
- Ali

== Production ==
Yamudiki Mogudu was produced by Chiranjeevi's friends from his film institute days—Sudhakar, Hari Prasad, and G. V. Narayana Rao. This film marked Narayana Rao's second production with Chiranjeevi after Devanthakudu (1984), and Chiranjeevi's third collaboration with director Ravi Raja Pinisetty. The film was distributed by Geetha Arts.

Despite initial discussions with veteran writer D. V. Narasa Raju, Satyanand ultimately wrote the script. The story, co-developed by Satyanand and G. V. Narayana Rao, was inspired by the American film Heaven Can Wait (1978), which itself was based on the 1938 stage play of the same name by Harry Segall. During the story discussions, Satyanand introduced the concept of seven look-alikes existing in the world, and the idea of one person's soul entering another's body, which became a central theme of the screenplay.

== Music ==
The music was composed by Raj–Koti and released by Aditya Music. All lyrics were penned by Veturi. The song "Andam Hindolam" was remixed in Supreme (2016).

Track listing
No.	Title	Singer(s)	Length
1.	"Ekku Bandekku Mava"	Mano, P. Susheela	4:21
2.	"Vanajallu Gillutunte"	S. P. Balasubrahmanyam, S. Janaki	4:43
3.	"Pillatoti"	S. P. Balasubrahmanyam, S. Janaki	4:45
4.	"Andam Hindolam"	S. P. Balasubrahmanyam, P. Susheela	4:47
5.	"Bahusha Ninu"	S. P. Balasubrahmanyam, P. Susheela	4:26
6.	"No No Natyamida"	S. P. Balasubrahmanyam, S. Janaki	3:10
Total length:			26:12

== Reception ==
Yamudiki Mogudu was an Industry Hit and the highest-grossing Telugu film at the time of its release. It marked director Ravi Raja Pinisetty's first blockbuster hit. Chiranjeevi's dual role was well received, and the music, composed by Raj–Koti, was a chartbuster and a key factor in the film's success. The film's success helped the producers achieve financial stability.

During the film's 100-day celebration, part of the proceeds was donated to the families of cotton farmers who had committed suicide that year.

== Legacy ==
Yamudiki Mogudu was later remade in Tamil as Athisaya Piravi (1990) starring Rajinikanth. The Telugu original was dubbed into Hindi as Chiranjeevi. In 2012, a film titled Yamudiki Mogudu was released with Allari Naresh in the lead, inspired by the original film.
