= Paattu Paadava =

- Title card
- Directed by: B. R. Vijayalakshmi
- Written by: B. R. Vijayalakshmi; Sivaram Gandhi (dialogues)
- Produced by: P. Mohanraj; P. Dhanaraj
- Starring: S. P. Balasubrahmanyam; Rahman; Lavanya Rajesh
- Cinematography: B. R. Vijayalakshmi
- Edited by: T. Gunasekaran
- Music by: Ilaiyaraaja
- Production company: Kiran Films
- Release date: 10 February 1995
- Running time: 145 minutes
- Country: India
- Language: Tamil

Paattu Paadava (transl. Shall I sing a song?) is a 1995 Indian Tamil-language romantic drama film directed by B. R. Vijayalakshmi in her directorial debut. The film stars S. P. Balasubrahmanyam, Rahman and newcomer Lavanya Rajesh, with Janagaraj, Kalyan Kumar, Mohan Natarajan, Chinni Jayanth, Srividya, C. R. Saraswathi and Sabitha Anand playing supporting roles. It was released on 10 February 1995, and was an average grosser at the box office.

== Plot ==
Rishi is a doctor in a mental hospital and treats his patients like his family. Rangarajan is the director of the hospital. Devi, the daughter of a wealthy man, is a social worker and a joyful woman. Murali acts like a mental patient and a mute person in the mental hospital, but only Rangarajan knows that he is perfectly fine.

Devi starts visiting the mental hospital very often. After a few quarrels with Rishi, Devi becomes good friends with him. She is intrigued by Murali and starts spending a lot of time with him. Murali slowly falls in love with Devi, while Rishi and Devi express their love and fall in love with each other. Everything goes well until Devi finds out that Murali is perfectly alright. Rangarajan reveals Murali's tragic past to her.

In the past, Murali lived happily with his parents. His parents, Gangadharan and Janaki, did a love marriage and did not have their family's support. One day, Janaki was arrested for procurement; Gangadharan made that complaint. Gangadharan then fled the village alone, while Murali was down and out. People thought he was a mentally ill boy, so they sent him to Rangarajan's mental hospital. Later, his mother died in jail. The kind-hearted Rangarajan decided to keep Murali in his mental hospital; he raised him like his own child.

Feeling hurt and vexed by life, Murali leaves the mental hospital without informing anyone. They finally find him in the street. Devi feels that Murali sings well, so she registers his name in a singing competition. At the singing competition, Murali sees his father Gangadharan in the audience. His father started a new life and married a rich bride; he is now a business magnate. His father turns out to be Rishi's father, too. Murali wins the competition and becomes a playback singer. He wins many awards and is now the most successful in Tamil cinema. Murali finally reveals to Rishi that he is in love with Devi. In the end, during Murali and Devi's marriage, Murali recognises the love between Rishi and Devi. He sacrifices his love and gets them married.

== Cast ==
- S. P. Balasubrahmanyam as Murali/Bubly Mass
- Rahman as Rishi
- Lavanya Rajesh as Devi
- Janagaraj as Rangarajan
- Kalyan Kumar as Devi's father
- Mohan Natarajan as Gangadharan
- Chinni Jayanth as Romeo
- Srividya as Rishi's mother
- C. R. Saraswathi as Devi's mother
- Sabitha Anand as Janaki
- Kavithalaya Krishnan
- Typist Gopu as Naidu
- Master Kiran Pradeep
- Baby Divya as Divya
- Master Pradeep
- Bonda Mani
- Khushbu in a guest appearance
- M. S. Viswanathan as himself (cameo appearance)
- Gangai Amaran as himself (cameo appearance)

== Soundtrack ==
The soundtrack was composed by Ilaiyaraaja, with lyrics written by Vaali.

Song	Singer(s)	Length
"Chinna Kanmanikkulle"	S. P. Balasubrahmanyam	5:44
"Chinna Kanmanikkulle" (Female)	Sunanda (singer)	2:33
"Vazhi Vidu Vazhi"	S. P. Balasubrahmanyam, Ilaiyaraaja	5:18
"Poongaatrile Oru Kaalai"	Lekha, Malgudi Subha, Sindhu	4:57
"Nil Nil Nil"	Ilaiyaraaja, Uma Ramanan	5:00
"Ada Va Va"	S. P. Balasubrahmanyam	5:09
"Iniya Gaanam"	S. P. Balasubrahmanyam, Arunmozhi, S. N. Surendar	5:51
"Paadura"	K. S. Chithra	5:21

== Reception ==
Thulasi of Kalki found Ilaiyaraaja's music, art direction, costumes and cinematography as positives but called the story and unnecessary stunt as drawbacks.
