= Sirai Paravai =

- Poster
- Directed by: Manobala
- Screenplay by: P. Kalaimani
- Produced by: V. N. J. Manivannan
- Starring: Vijayakanth; Radikaa; Lakshmi
- Cinematography: B. R. Vijayalakshmi
- Edited by: Gauthaman
- Music by: Ilaiyaraaja
- Production company: Manthralaya Cine Creations
- Release date: 14 January 1987
- Running time: 137 minutes
- Country: India
- Language: Tamil

Sirai Paravai (transl. Jail Bird) is a 1987 Indian Tamil-language action drama film directed by Manobala and written by P. Kalaimani. The film stars Vijayakanth, Radikaa and Lakshmi. It was released on 14 January 1987.

== Cast ==
- Vijayakanth as DCP Rajasekaran
- Radikaa as Valli
- Baby Shalini
- Malaysia Vasudevan
- Vennira Aadai Moorthy
- Senthil
- Lakshmi

== Production ==
Vijayakanth was initially uninterested in doing the film as it was female centric, but after Kalaimani and Manobala promised to add more scenes featuring him, he agreed. During the filming of an action sequence, filmed by B. R. Vijayalakshmi lying low holding the camera to her face, Vijayakanth fell on the camera, causing Vijayalakshmi to bleed, but she was treated the same day and completed the sequence. A few scenes were shot at a bungalow at Pallavaram, Chennai. While shooting at Mudumalai forests, Shalini got hurt during the scene where she rides on an elephant.

== Soundtrack ==
The music was composed by Ilaiyaraaja. The song "Anandam Pongida" is set to the Carnatic raga Kharaharapriya.

Song title	Singers	Lyricist
"Anandam Pongida"	K. J. Yesudas, Sunandha & Chorus	Mu. Metha
"Paavam Oru"	Malaysia Vasudevan	Vairamuthu
"Solli Thaaren"	Malaysia Vasudevan & Vani Jairam	Vaali
"Yaarunnu"	S. Janaki & Saibaba	Muthulingam
