= Johny Lal =

Indian cinematographer (died 2021)

- Born: Mumbai, India
- Died: 21 April 2021; Mumbai, India
- Occupation: Director Of Photography
- Parent: S. S. Lal
- Relatives: Kabir Lal (brother)

Johny Lal was an Indian cinematographer who worked predominantly in Bollywood and Kannada films. Lal's well-known films include Veerey Ki Wedding (2018), Partner (2007), Kucch To Hai (2003), Jeena Sirf Merre Liye (2002), Rehnaa Hai Terre Dil Mein (2001) and Mujhe Kucch Kehna Hai (2001).

Lal won the Karnataka State Film Award for Best Cinematographer for Aathanka in 1993.

== Career ==
In his early career, Lal worked as an associate cameraman. He later worked as an independent cinematographer in several successful films like Aathanka, Partner, Kucch To Hai, Yaadein, One 2 Ka 4, Om Jai Jagadish, Jeena Sirf Merre Liye, Rehnaa Hai Terre Dil Mein, Mujhe Kucch Kehna Hai and Shaadi Se Pehle.

== Death ==
Lal died due to COVID-19 related complications on 21 April 2021.

== Awards ==
Karnataka State Film Awards

- Best Cinematographer for Aathanka
