= Policena Hendthi =

- Directed by: Om Sai Prakash
- Story by: Relangi Narasimha Rao
- Produced by: Hari Prasad; Raghu Babu; Sudhakar; A. J. V. Prasad
- Starring: Shashikumar; Malashri; Devaraj; Vinaya Prasad
- Cinematography: J. G. Krishna
- Edited by: K. Narasaiah
- Music by: M. Ranga Rao
- Production company: Dynamic Film Makers
- Release date: 1990
- Running time: 135 minutes
- Country: India
- Language: Kannada

Policena Hendthi (transl. Policeman's wife) is a 1990 Indian Kannada-language action drama film directed by Om Sai Prakash and produced under Dynamic Film Makers. The film features Shashikumar, Malashri and Devaraj in the lead roles. The film's music was composed by M. Ranga Rao. The film was a remake of the Telugu film Police Bharya. The film was a box office success.

== Plot ==
This a story of Vanaja (Malashree), a television news reader who provides for her brother Avatari Lokayya (Devaraj) and his wife (Vinaya Prasad). The unemployed brother makes his money by putting on various disguises until he is caught trying to masquerade as a lower-caste person in order to obtain state benefits. He later delivers a speech about the evils anti-caste discrimination laws. Vanaja marries a timid cop (Shashikumar) and transforms him into a real man. She also arranges the cop's sister's marriage while herself getting through a tough civil service examination.

== Cast ==
- Shashikumar as Gireesha
- Malashri as Vanaja
- Devaraj as Avathari Lokayya, Vanaja's brother
- Vinaya Prasad as Lakshmi, Lokayya's wife
- Jai Jagadish as SP
- Anjana as Sathyabhama, SP's rude wife
- Tara, as Sundari Gireesha's friend.
- Mukhyamantri Chandru as Shankarayya, Gireesha's father
- Kaminidharan as Janaki, Giresha's mother
- M. S. Umesh Vanaja's assistent
- Srinivasa Murthy Lawyer
- Sudha Narasimharaju Manjula, Gireesha's sister
- Bank Janardhan
- Mysore Lokesh as Police Constable

== Soundtrack ==
The soundtrack of the film was composed by M. Ranga Rao.

Track listing
No.	Title	Lyrics	Singer(s)	Length
1.	"Hari Om Hari Om"	R. N. Jayagopal	Mano
2.	"Nee Ondu Saari"	R. N. Jayagopal	Mano, Radhika
3.	"Modalane Chumbana"	R. N. Jayagopal	Mano, Manjula Gururaj
4.	"Karthika Masadali Hunnime Deepa"	R. N. Jayagopal	Manjula Gururaj
5.	"Ammamma Medamma"	R. N. Jayagopal	Mano, Radhika
