= Renuka Sharma =

Indian film director (1939–2021)

- Born: 1939
- Died: 5 May 2021 (aged 81–82); Bangalore, India
- Occupation: Director

Renuka Sharma (1939 – 5 May 2021) was a director who worked in Kannada cinema. He was known for his mythological and historical films. He debuted as director with the film Anupama starring Anant Nag and Madhavi.

== Death ==
He died from COVID-19 on 5 May 2021.

== Films ==
- Anupama (1981)
- Kaviratna Kalidasa (1983)
- Shabash Vikram (1985)
- Satkara (1986)
- Namma Ooru Devathe (1986)
- Anjada Gandu (1988)
- Kindari Jogi (1989)
- Sabarimala Sree Ayyappa (1990)
- Bharjari Gandu (1992)
- Prutviraj (1992)
- Hatamari Hennu Kiladi Gandu (1992)
- Kollura Sri Mookambika (1993)
- Professor (1995)
- Mahasadhvi Mallamma (2005)
