= Police Bharya =

- Directed by: Relangi Narasimha Rao
- Produced by: P. Balaram
- Starring: Naresh; Seetha; Gollapudi Maruthi Rao; Ahuthi Prasad; Potti Prasad; Srilatha; Dubbing Janaki; Varalakshmi; Omkar; Anjana
- Music by: Raj-Koti
- Release date: 1990
- Country: India
- Language: Telugu

Police Bharya (transl. Policeman's wife) is a Telugu film starring Naresh, Seetha and Gollapudi Maruti Rao. The film was directed by Relangi Narasimha Rao. The film was remade in Kannada as Policena Hendthi.

== Cast ==
- Naresh
- Seetha
- Anjana
- Gollapudi Maruthi Rao
- Ahuthi Prasad
- Potti Prasad
- Rajyalakshmi
- Srilatha
- Dubbing Janaki
- Varalakshmi
- Juttu Narasimhan
- Chalapathi Rao
