= Therkathi Kallan =

- Poster
- Directed by: P. Kalaimani
- Written by: P. Kalaimani
- Based on: Bhanumati Gari Mogudu (Telugu)(1987) by A. Kodandarami Reddy
- Produced by: P. Kalaimani
- Starring: Vijayakanth; Radhika
- Cinematography: B. R. Vijayalakshmi
- Edited by: Gowthaman
- Music by: Ilaiyaraaja
- Production company: Everest Films
- Release date: 22 April 1988
- Running time: 125 minutes
- Country: India
- Language: Tamil

Therkathi Kallan (transl. Southern thief) is a 1988 Indian Tamil-language action comedy film produced, written and directed by P. Kalaimani. The film stars Vijayakanth and Radhika. It is a remake of the 1987 Telugu film Bhanumati Gari Mogudu, for which Kalaimani wrote the story. The film was released on 22 April 1988.

== Plot ==
Near Vetriyampathi, Kallan, an uneducated yet courageous young man, resides with his mother. His cousin, Annakili, harbors romantic feelings for him, but her mother refuses to consider their marriage due to Kallan's impoverished state. Instead, she plans to marry Annakili to Kathamuthu, another cousin involved in illicit liquor trade. Kallan's mother encourages him to travel to Madras to earn a livelihood, enabling him to purchase land. Upon arriving in Madras, Kallan encounters Radha, a wealthy and arrogant heiress, who, along with her friends, bullies and gets him arrested. At the police station, Pandurangan, an absent-minded film production manager, mistakenly bails Kallan out, believing him to be a screenwriter. Kallan inadvertently lands a role as a stunt double in a film production. Radha's former assistant turned sister-in-law, Sulakshana, along with Radha's brother, Ravi resists Radha's extravagant spending. Enraged, Radha demands her brother to divide their property. However, her brother reveals that she must marry to inherit her share. Radha refuses, and instead, borrows money from a pawnbroker.

Radha encounters Kallan at a film shooting location and discovers his monetary motivations. She devises a plan, proposing that Kallan pretend to be her husband. Ravi arranges for a legal marriage registration, and Kallan, enticed by the payment, agrees. The property division is delayed for six months, as the advocate is out of town. With no alternative, Radha convinces Kallan to continue the charade until the property is transferred to her name. Ravi soon discovers Kallan's deception and, with Sulakshana's guidance, devises a plan to utilize Kallan to reform Radha. Kallan joins forces with Ravi and Sulakshana, attempting to assert his position as Radha's husband. Radha, with the assistance of her advocate Rao, obtains a court injunction, prohibiting Kallan from forcing her into intimate relations without her consent. Kallan, undeterred, challenges Radha, vowing to win her affection. Kallan departs from Radha's residence, resumes his work as a stunt double, and eventually purchases a farmland, fulfilling his desire.

Six months later, the advocate responsible for handling the property deed returned, requesting Kallan's signature. Radha and Rao visit Kallan's village Karisapatti, where the panchayat orders Radha to reside with Kallan. Radha's moneylender had obtained a court warrant to arrest her for her non-repayment of the loan. Kallan demands that Radha perform the household chores before he signs the documents. Also, Kallan assigns Radha to perform rituals, which result in burn wounds. As Kallan disguisedly tends to her injuries, Radha offers him a ring in a gesture of gratitude. Chellakirukkan, a wealthy landlord and womanizer, misbehaves with Radha at the market, prompting her to slap him. Kallan intervenes, threatening Chellakirukkan to publicly apologize for his misconduct. Seeking revenge, Chellakirukkan deceives Kathamuthu by falsely claiming that Annakili is having an illicit affair with Kallan. Kathamuthu forces Annakili into marriage, but Kallan rescues her.

To tarnish Kallan's reputation, Chellakirukkan provides Radha with sedative tablets, instructing her to give them to Kallan through Annakili. The plan backfires when Radha and Annakili unknowingly consume the tablets. Annakili is raped by Kathamuthu, while Radha's intoxication leads to her dancing inappropriately, damaging her reputation. Distraught, Radha contemplates suicide but is stopped by Kallan. Kallan offers to let Radha chop off his hand if she believes he took advantage of her while she was intoxicated. But, Radha notices her ring on Kallan's hand, realizing his genuine love for her. Radha's friend reveals that Kallan had secretly repaid Radha's debt and also advises Radha to accept Kallan as her husband, highlighting his exceptional qualities. At the village panchayat, Chellakirukkan falsely accuses Radha of orchestrating Annakili's rape by providing the sedative tablets. However, Kallan defends his wife, but the panchayat unjustly ostracizes Kallan and his family from the village. Annakili discovers that Kathamuthu was her rapist, but Chellakirukkan confines her to a room.

Chellakirukkan and his men attempt to punish Radha by shaving her head. Kallan fights off the attackers, and the village men eventually come to his aid. The village women seize Chellakirukkan and shave his head, while Kallan forgives Kathamuthu at Annakili's request. Radha saves Kallan from an explosive thrown by Chellakirukkan's men. Finally, Radha and Kallan reunite.

== Cast ==
- Vijayakanth as Kallan
- Radhika as Radha
- Sulakshana as Sulakshana, Radha's sister-in-law
- Madhuri as Annakili, Kallan's cousin
- V. K. Ramasamy as Rao, advocate
- S. S. Chandran as a film director
- Ravichandran as Ravi, Radha's brother
- Malaysia Vasudevan as Chellakirukkan
- Janagaraj as Pandurangan, production manager
- Thyagu as an actor
- Idichapuli Selvaraj as an assistant director
- Thayir Vadai Desigan as a cinematographer
- Vennira Aadai Moorthy as Radha's servant
- Usilai Mani as Radha's cook
- Chinni Jayanth as Chellakirukkan's sidekick
- Sivaraman as Chellakirukkan's sidekick
- Samikannu as a village president
- Poornam Viswanathan as an advocate
- M. R. Krishnamurthy as Annakili's father
- Pasi Narayanan as a bus co-passenger
- Typist Gopu as Radha's manager
- Vellai Subbaiah as a bus conductor
- Periya Karuppu Thevar as a villager
- S. N. Lakshmi as Kallan's mother
- Kutty Padmini as Radha's friend
- Vijayachandrika as Chellakirukkan's wife
- Gandhimathi as Aaaya

== Production ==
The film was announced in 1986 with Manivannan being initially chosen as director while Radha being the initial lead actress.

== Soundtrack ==
The music was composed by Ilaiyaraaja and lyrics were written by Gangai Amaran. The song "Thilla Thaangu" inspired the chorus of "Thanga Sela" in Kaala (2018).

| Song | Singers | Length |
|---|---|---|
| "Vaada Vaada En Raasa" (Title Song) | Ilaiyaraaja and chorus | 03:07 |
| "Inthiran Ketahu Pennalae" | K. S. Chithra and chorus | 04:24 |
| "Pottu Vachu Pakkuporen" | S. P. Balasubrahmanyam | 03:38 |
| "Thilla Thaangu" | Malaysia Vasudevan and K. S. Chithra | 04:33 |
| "Radha Azhaikkiral" | S. Janaki | 04:28 |
| "Kannukkulla Thookkam Pochi" | S. Janaki | 04:39 |

== Reception ==
The Indian Express wrote, "The 'taming of the shrew' line has been somewhat of a lasting preoccupation with our filmmakers. But it's interesting how it gets projected in the Indian context". Jayamanmadhan of Kalki felt director leaves all the characters hanging in the air and many actors were underutilised and also felt since the screenplay feels like thatched roof, oune could not come up with positive terms to define the film.
