= Paaru Paaru Pattanam Paaru =

- Title card
- Directed by: Manobala
- Written by: P. Kalaimani
- Produced by: Perumal
- Starring: Mohan; Ranjini
- Cinematography: Ashok Kumar
- Edited by: Gowthaman
- Music by: Ilaiyaraaja
- Production company: Kalaimani Movies
- Release date: 7 September 1986
- Country: India
- Language: Tamil

Paaru Paaru Pattanam Paaru (transl. Look, look, look at the city) is a 1986 Indian Tamil-language comedy film directed by Manobala and written by P. Kalaimani. The film stars Mohan and Ranjini, in her first film as lead actress. It was released on 7 September 1986, and did not perform well at the box office. The film was remade in Telugu as Aa Okkati Adakku (1993), which was remade in Kannada as Bal Nan Maga (1995) and in Hindi as Mr. and Mrs. Khiladi (1997).

== Plot ==
A man believing immensely in astrology eventually has his life ruined.

== Cast ==
- Mohan
- Ranjini
- Vennira Aadai Moorthy
- Vinu Chakravarthy
- Thengai Srinivasan
- Manorama
- T. K. S. Chandran
- Senthil
- Ennathe Kannaiah
- Usilai Mani
- Loose Mohan
- Kumarimuthu
- Pasi Narayanan
- Vellai Subbaiah
- Bayilvan Ranganathan
- Typist Gopu
- Chinni Jayanth

== Production ==
After the success of Pillai Nila, director Manobala did not want to make another horror film, but preferred to make a comedy. Five of Ilaiyaraaja's unused songs were bought and P. Kalaimani weaved a story around them, which became Paaru Paaru Pattanam Paaru. The film was launched at AVM Studios in 1985 with Nalini being originally chosen as lead actress. The filming began with the shoot of song "Thendral Varum" with Mohan and Nalini. It is the first film for Ranjini as lead actress.

== Soundtrack ==
The music was composed by Ilaiyaraaja. The song "Yaar Thoorigai" is set to the Carnatic raga Sindhu Bhairavi.

Track listing
No.	Title	Lyrics	Singer(s)	Length
1.	"Neyranthaan Aaguthu"	Vairamuthu	Malaysia Vasudevan, Vani Jairam
2.	"Paavai Oru Medai"	Gangai Amaran	Malaysia Vasudevan, Deepan Chakravarthy, Sasirekha
3.	"Theeravai Nee"	Muthulingam	S. P. Balasubrahmanyam
4.	"Yaar Thoorigai"	Gangai Amaran	S. P. Balasubrahmanyam Uma Ramanan
5.	"Thendral Varum"	Vaali	S. P. Balasubrahmanyam, S. Janaki

== Release and reception ==
Paaru Paaru Pattanam Paaru was released on 7 September 1986. Jayamanmadhan of Kalki wrote that almost three-quarters of the film would have been a full-length comedy if it had been extended and taken to happy end. According to Manobala, the film failed as audiences expected another suspenseful film like Pillai Nila from him.
