= Daddy (1992 film) =

- Film poster
- Directed by: Sangeeth Sivan
- Written by: B. R. Vijayalakshmi
- Story by: B. R. Vijayalakshmi
- Starring: Suresh Gopi; Arvind Swamy; Gouthami
- Cinematography: Santosh Sivan
- Edited by: A. Sreekar Prasad
- Music by: S. P. Venkatesh
- Release date: 24 December 1992
- Country: India
- Language: Malayalam

Daddy is a 1992 Indian Malayalam-language film, starring Suresh Gopi, Arvind Swamy and Gouthami. The film was dubbed and released in Tamil as Daddy Mummy.

== Plot ==
Vinu and Ammu live in the same village as the Father. Father takes care of Vinu. Anand comes to the village, newly charged as Circle Inspector where he befriends Vinu and Ammu. Anand adopts Vinu eventually. Antony, an escaped convict, is the father of Vinu. Father tells Anand about how Antony became a convict after his wife's death, leaving his new born son Vinu with the Father. Anand lets him stay with Vinu until his first holy communion day. Vinu will come to know about his relationship with Antony. The day after his first holy communion day, Antony surrenders to the police, leaving Vinu with Anand and Ammu.

== Cast ==
- Suresh Gopi as Antony
- Arvind Swamy as Anand, Circle Inspector
- Gautami as Ammu
- Master Paul as Vinu
- Rani as Syama, Anand's collage mate
- Renuka as Antony's wife and Vinu's mother
- Rajan P. Dev as Father
- C. I. Paul as Constable Chacko
- Augustine as Sub-Inspector Philip
- T. P. Madhavan

== Soundtrack ==
Music was given by S. P. Venkatesh.
