= Sudhakar (actor) =

Indian actor, comedian, film producer

- Born: Markapur, Andhra Pradesh, India
- Occupations: Actor; producer
- Years active: 1978-present

Sudhakar is a retired Indian actor, comedian and film producer, who worked in Telugu, Tamil, and Kannada films. He has appeared in more than 600 films, predominantly in Telugu and Tamil language films. He has produced several films including Yamudiki Mogudu (1988). He won two Nandi Awards.

== Early life and personal life ==
Sudhakar was born in Vishakapatnam district. His father was a deputy collector who traveled all across Andhra Pradesh. He was the seventh and youngest of seven brothers. After completing his intermediate at Andhra-Hindu College in Guntur, he enrolled in the Madras Film Institute to pursue a career in film acting.

== Film career ==
Sudhakar made his acting debut as a lead hero in the 1978 Tamil film, Kizhakke Pogum Rail. He portrayed the lead hero in a number of Tamil films and had a number of box office successes.

In 1980, he forayed into Telugu films with Srushti Rahasyalu. Initially, he played lead roles in Telugu. For close to a decade, he continued playing second lead and supporting roles. From the early 90s, he started taking up comic roles and gained a lot of popularity as one of the top comedians in Telugu industry. His unusual vocal modulation and speech pronunciation made him an ideal choice for comedic roles on the silver screen.

He turned producer with Chiranjeevi starrer 1988 film Yamudiki Mogudu, and went on to produce three more films.

As a comedian, some of his best films include Allari Priyudu (1993), Sisindri (1995), Hitler (1997) and Dongaata (1997), Pelli Pandiri (1997), among others.

== Awards ==
Nandi Awards

- Best Male Comedian - Peddarikam (1992)
- Best Male Comedian - Snehitulu (1998)

== Partial filmography ==
=== Telugu ===
- Srushti Rahasyalu (1980)
- Pavitra Prema (1980)
- Agni Poolu (1981)
- Oorukichina Maata (1981)
- Pedala Brathukulu (1981)
- Bhogi Mantalu (1981)
- Chilipi Vayasu (1982)
- Kalavari Samsaram (1982)
- Bangaru Bhoomi (1982)
- Nijam Chepithe Nerama (1983)
- Kalyana Veena (1983)
- Mayagadu (1983)
- Konte Kodallu (1983)
- Prema Pichollu (1983)
- Janani Janmabhoomi (1984)
- Swathi (1984)
- Mukkopi (1984)
- Daku (1984)
- Sitaara (1984)
- Rama Rao Gopal Rao (1984)
- Srimathi Kavali (1984)
- Mogudu Pellalu (1985)
- Vintha Mogudu (1985)
- Maya Mohini (1985)
- Maha Manishi (1985)
- Mogudu Pellalu (1985)
- Maa Inti Mahalakshmi (1985)
- Paripoyina Khaideelu (1985)
- Mayadari Maridi (1985)
- Kutra (1986)
- Vikram (1986)
- Chantabbai (1986)
- Kaliyuga Krishnudu (1986)
- Tandra Paparayudu (1986)
- Chanakya Sapatham (1986)
- Majnu (1987)
- Sahasa Samrat (1987)
- Chakravarthy (1987)
- Allari Krishnayya (1987)
- Lawyer Bharathi Devi (1987)
- Rotation Chakravarthy (1987)
- President Gari Abbai (1987)
- Bharatamlo Arjunudu (1987)
- Trimurtulu (1987)
- Collector Gari Abbai (1987)
- Ramu (1987)
- Vijetha Vikram (1987)
- Aatma Bandhuvulu (1987)
- Indra Dhanusu (1988)
- Annapurnamma Gari Alludu (1988)
- Nyayam Kosam (1988)
- Prithviraj (1988)
- Raktha Thilakam (1988)
- Marana Mrudangam (1988)
- Yuddha Bhoomi (1988)
- Samsaram (1988)
- August 15 Raatri (1988)
- Yamudiki Mogudu (1988)
- Muthyamantha Muddu (1989)
- Attaku Yamudu Ammayiki Mogudu (1989)
- Manchivaaru Maavaaru (1989)
- Paila Pachessu (1989)
- Neram Nadia Kadu (1989)
- Ontari Poratam (1989)
- Vicky Daada (1989)
- Naa Mogudu Naake Sontham (1989)
- State Rowdy (1989)
- Manchi Kutumbam (1989)
- Raja Vikramarka (1990)
- Kaliyuga Abhimanyudu (1990)
- Idem Pellam Baboi (1990)
- Alludugaru (1990)
- Kondaveeti Rowdy (1990)
- Vishnu (1990)
- Maa Inti Katha (1990)
- Ghatana (1990)
- Irugillu Porugillu (1990)
- Kodama Simham (1990)
- Chinnari Muddula Papa (1990)
- Seetharamayya Gari Manavaralu (1991)
- Kobbari Bondam (1991)
- Bhargav (1991)
- Jeevana Chadarangam (1991)
- Parishkaram (1991)
- Stuartpuram Police Station (1991)
- Asadhyulu (1992)
- Peddarikam (1992)
- Prema Sikharam (1992)
- Repati Koduku (1992)
- Bangaru Mama (1992)
- Nani (1992)
- Golmaal Govindam (1992)
- Jagannatham & Sons (1992)
- Pachchani Samsaram (1992)
- 420 (1992)
- Mechanic Alludu (1993)
- Allari Priyudu (1993)
- Kondapalli Raja (1993)
- Kokkoro Ko (1993)
- Pelli Gola (1993)
- Kaliyugam (1993)
- Mogudu Garu (1993)
- Kirayi Gunda (1993)
- One by Two (1993)
- Aasayam (1993)
- Chinna Alludu (1993)
- Bhale Pellam (1994)
- President Gari Alludu (1994)
- Gharana Alludu (1994)
- Thodi Kodallu (1994)
- Allari Premikudu (1994)
- Palletoori Mogudu (1994)
- Mugguru Monagallu (1994)
- Theerpu (1994)
- Kurradhi Kurradu (1994)
- Bhale Bullodu (1995)
- Sankalpam (1995)
- Alibaba Adbhuta Deepam (1995)
- Rendu Krishnudu (1995)
- Sisindri (1995)
- Mayabazaar (1995)
- Street Fighter (1995)
- Aadaalla Majaka (1995)
- Raja Simham (1995)
- Lingababu Love Story (1995)
- Shubhamastu (1995)
- Sahasa Veerudu Sagara Kanya (1996)
- Little Soldiers (1996)
- Pavitra Bandham (1996)
- Bombay Priyudu (1996)
- Hitler (1997)
- Pelli Chesukundam (1997)
- Muddula Mogudu (1997)
- Gokulamlo Seeta (1997)
- Circus Sattipandu (1997)
- Subhalekhalu (1997)
- Ugadi (1997)
- Dongaata (1997)
- Subhakankshalu (1997)
- Pattukondi Chuddam (1997)
- Pelli Pandiri (1997)
- Pelli Kanuka (1998)
- Pelli Peetalu (1998)
- Suswagatham (1998)
- Sreevarante Maavare (1998)
- Yuvarathna Rana (1998)
- Suprabhatam (1998)
- Pavitra Prema (1998)
- Srimathi Vellostha (1998)
- Suryudu (1998)
- Suryavamsam (1998)
- Pandaga (1998)
- Snehithulu (1998)
- Abhishekam (1998)
- Auto Driver (1998)
- Swapnalokam (1999)
- Yamajathakudu (1999)
- Raja (1999)
- Iddaru Mitrulu (1999)
- Naa Hrudayamlo Nidurinche Cheli (1999)
- Hello...Yama! (1999)
- Maa Balaji (1999)
- Postman (2000)
- Nuvvu Vastavani (2000)
- Choosoddaam Randi (2000)
- Okkadu Chalu (2000)
- Maa Pelliki Randi (2000)
- Manasunna Maaraju (2000)
- Manasichanu (2000)
- Moodu Mukkalaata (2000)
- Navvuthu Bathakalira (2001)
- Kushi (2001)
- Ninnu Choodalani (2001)
- Inspector Vikram (2001)
- Tholi Valapu (2001)
- Repallelo Radha (2001)
- Chinna (2001)
- Evadra Rowdy (2001)
- Snehamante Idera (2001)
- Family Circus (2001)
- Darling Darling (2001)
- Neetho Cheppalani (2002)
- Tappu Chesi Pappu Koodu (2002)
- Neethone Vuntanu (2002)
- Gemeni (2002)
- Juniors (2003)
- Fools (2003)
- Puttintiki Ra Chelli (2004)
- Cheppave Chirugali (2004)
- Sankranti (2005)
- Lakshmi Kalyanam (2007)
- Doshi (2008)
- Drona (2009)
- Oka Padhakam Prakaram (2025)

=== Tamil ===
- Kizhakke Pogum Rail (1978)
- Inikkum Ilamai (1979)
- Ponnu Oorukku Pudhusu (1979)
- Niram Maratha Pookal (1979)
- Manthoppu Kiliye (1979)
- Suvarilladha Chiththirangal (1979)
- Chakkalathi (1979)
- Aayiram Vaasal Idhayam (1980)
- Kallukkul Eeram (1980)
- Karumbu Vil (1980)
- Chinna Chinna Veedu Katti (1980)
- Kuruvikoodu (1980)
- Thai Pongal (1980)
- Anna Paravai (1980)
- Chinnajiru Kiliye (1980)
- Malargale Malarungal (1980)
- Ethir Veetu Jannal (1980)
- Enga Ooru Rasathi (1980)
- Azhaithal Varuven (1980)
- Rusi Kanda Poonai (1980)
- Pennin Vazhkai (1981)
- Oruthi Mattum Karaiyinile (1981)
- Pen Manam Pesugirathu (1981)
- Nadhi Ondru Karai Moondru (1981)
- Tharayil Vazhum Meengal (1981)
- Thunaivi (1982)
- Kai Naattu (1988)
- Maduraikara Thambi (1988)
- Athisaya Piravi (1990)
- Kadhal Azhivathillai (2002)
- Thaanaa Serndha Koottam (2018)

=== Kannada ===
- Nagaradalli Nayakaru (1992)
- Raktha Kanneeru (2003)

=== Malayalam ===
- Paapathinu Maranamilla (1979)

=== Producer ===
- Yamudiki Mogudu (1988)
- Tatayya Pelli Manavadi Shobhanam (1989)
- Policena Hendthi (1990; Kannada)
- Parugo Parugu (1993)
