= Yaadein =

Yaadein may refer to:

- Yaadein, a 1964 Indian film by Sunil Dutt
- Yaadein (1995 film)
- Yaadein, a 2001 Indian film by Subhash Ghai
- Hui Gumm Yaadein Ek Doctor, Do Zindagiyaan, an Indian television series

== See also ==
- Yaadgaar (disambiguation)
