= Manitha Jaathi =

- Poster
- Directed by: P. Kalaimani
- Written by: P. Kalaimani
- Produced by: P. Kalaimani
- Starring: Sivakumar; Ramki; Nirosha; Ravichandran
- Music by: Ilaiyaraaja
- Production company: Everest Films
- Release date: 7 June 1991
- Country: India
- Language: Tamil

Manitha Jaathi (transl. The human caste) is a 1991 Indian Tamil-language film written, directed and produced by P. Kalaimani. The film stars Sivakumar, Ramki, Nirosha and Ravichandran. It was released on 7 June 1991.

== Cast ==
- Sivakumar
- Ramki
- Nirosha
- Ravichandran

== Production ==
Manitha Jaathi is the third and final film directed by Kalaimani, who also wrote and produced it. The film was in production as early as November 1988. The film took two years to be completed as Kalaimani, being a perfectionist, changed the characters as per his wish; especially Nirosha's character was changed and was again reshot.

== Soundtrack ==
The music was composed by Ilaiyaraaja. The song "Puthusu Puthusu" is set to the raga Sarasangi.

Song	Singers	Lyrics	Length
"Moonam Piraiyinile"	S. Janaki	Vaali	04:31
"Siru Paatham Paarthen"	Gangai Amaran, K. S. Chithra	Vaali	04:38
"Sellamma"	S. P. Sailaja	Vaali	04:48
"Puthusu Puthusu"	Gangai Amaran, S. Janaki	Vaali	04:19
"Enga Seemathurai"	K. S. Chithra	Thirupathooran	04:21
"Oorsanatha Veruthu"	Malaysia Vasudevan	Vaali	03:48
