= P. Kalaimani =

Indian screenwriter

- Born: P. Kalaimani; 1950
- Died: 3 April 2012 (aged 62); Chennai, Tamil Nadu, India
- Occupations: Writer, producer, director
- Spouse: Saraswathi

P. Kalaimani was an Indian writer, producer and director who worked in the Tamil cinema. He has written story, screenplay and dialogues for more than 100 films.

== Film career ==
He was a writer who has been in the industry for three decades and seen success through his work, some of his greatest work are Bharathiraaja's 16 Vayathinile, Mann Vasanai, Gopurangal Saivathillai, Muthal Vasantham, Ingeyum Oru Gangai and many more. He was awarded Kalaimamani by the state government and he has also produced and directed few movies. He worked with the likes of Sathyaraj and Vijayakanth in his career spanning over three decades. His last film as dialogue writer was Kuruvi. He has also written and directed films like Therkathi Kallan and Manitha Jaathi.

He produced lot of films under the banner of Everest Films.

== Partial filmography ==
Year	Film	Credited as			Notes
Year	Film	Director	Writer	Producer	Notes
1977	16 Vayathinile	✗	Dialogues	✗	Dialogues only
1979	Neeya?	✗	Story	✗	
1979	Mangala Vaathiyam	✗	Story	✗	
1979	Neela Kadalin orathile	✗	Story	✗	
1980	Enga Ooru Rasathi	✗	Story	✗	
1980	Chinna Chinna Veedu Katti	✗	Story	✗	
1980	Anna Paravai	✗	Story	✗	
1982	Valibamey Vaa Vaa	✗	Story	✗	
1982	Kaadhal Oviyam	✗	Story	✗	
1982	Gopurangal Saivathillai	✗	Story	✓	
1983	Mann Vasanai	✗	Story	✗	
1983	Manaivi Solle Manthiram	✗	Story	✓	
1984	Ingeyum Oru Gangai	✗	✗	✓	
1985	Pillai Nila	✗	Story	✓	
1985	Ambigai Neril Vanthaal	✗	✗	✓	
1986	Muthal Vasantham	✗	Story	✓	
1986	Paaru Paaru Pattanam Paaru	✗	Story	✓	
1987	Sirai Paravai	✗	Story	✗	
1987	Theertha Karaiyinile	✗	Story	✗	
1987	Bhanumati Gari Mogudu	✗	Story	✗	Telugu film
1988	Therkathi Kallan	✓	Story	✓	
1989	En Purushanthaan Enakku Mattumthaan	✗	Story	✗	
1989	Poruthadhu Pothum	✓	Story	✗	
1990	Mallu Vetti Minor	✗	Story	✓	
1991	Manitha Jaathi	✓	Story	✓	
1991	Aimbathilum Aasai Varum	✓	Story	✗	
1993	Kathirukka Neramillai	✗	Dialogues	✗	
1993	Chinna Mapillai	✗	Story	✗	
1993	Paarambariyam	✗	Story	✗	
1994	Kanmani	✗	Story	✗	
1994	Priyanka	✗	Dialogues	✗	
1994	Karuppu Nila	✗	Dialogues	✗	
1994	Pondattiye Deivam	✗	Story	✗	
1994	Manasu Rendum Pudhusu	✗	Story	✗	
1995	Makkal Aatchi	✗	Story	✗	
1996	Purushan Pondatti	✗	Story	✗	
1997	Pasamulla Pandiyare	✗	Story	✗	
1997	Pudhalvan	✗	Dialogues	✗	
1998	Guru Paarvai	✗	Screenplay	✗	
2000	Eazhaiyin Sirippil	✗	Story	✗	
2000	Unnai Kann Theduthey	✗	Story	✗	
2001	Thaalikaatha Kaaliamman	✗	Dialogues	✗	
2001	Super Kudumbam	✗	Story	✗	
2002	Naina	✗	Story	✗	
2002	Shakalaka Baby	✗	Story	✗	
2005	Veeranna	✗	Story	✗	
2008	Kuruvi	✗	Story discussion	✗	

== Death ==
He died at midnight on 3 April 2012 due to prolonged illness. He was survived by wife Saraswathi.
