= Aayiram Pookkal Malarattum =

1986 film by E. Ramdoss

- Poster
- Directed by: E. Ramdoss
- Written by: E. Ramdoss
- Produced by: K. Mohan Durai
- Starring: Mohan; Seetha; Ranjini
- Cinematography: Dinesh Baboo
- Edited by: R. Baskaran; B. Krishna Kumar
- Music by: V. S. Narasimhan
- Production company: Motherland Pictures
- Release date: 8 August 1986
- Running time: 133 minutes
- Country: India
- Language: Tamil

Aayiram Pookkal Malarattum (transl. Let a thousand flowers blossom) is a 1986 Indian Tamil-language romance film written and directed by E. Ramdoss in his debut. The film stars Mohan, Seetha and Ranjini. It was released on 8 August 1986.

== Cast ==
- Mohan as Arun
- Seetha as Seetha
- Ranjini
- Goundamani
- Senthil
- Janagaraj
- Rajkumar
- Chakravarthy
- Meesai Murugesan
- Madhumohan
- Poornam Viswanathan
- Charle
- Thyagu
- Chinni Jayanth
- Rajan
- Kuyili
- Baby Anju
- Baby Sharada Preetha
- K. S. Ravikumar

== Production ==
E. Ramdoss who worked as an assistant to P. S. Nivas, Manivannan and K. Rangaraj made his directorial debut with this film. Despite a publicised fallout between the producer and the original music composer Ilaiyaraaja, the film became a success commercially. The film was launched at Prasad recording studios and the title song was recorded on the same day. Minister V. V. Swaminathan lit the lamp and launched the film. The filming was held at Kodaikanal.

== Soundtrack ==
Soundtrack was composed by V. S. Narasimhan.

Track listing
No.	Title	Lyrics	Singer(s)	Length
1.	"Poomedaiyo"	Mu. Metha	S. P. Balasubrahmanyam, S. Janaki
2.	"Aayiram Pookkal"	Vairamuthu	P. Susheela
3.	"Megam Andha Megam"	Na. Kamarasan	S. P. Balasubrahmanyam
4.	"Nethu Unna Pathu"	Vaali	S. P. Balasubrahmanyam, S. Janaki
5.	"Kadhal Nila"	Vaali	S. P. Balasubramaniam
6.	"Idhu Ilamai Ezhuthum"	Muthulingam	S. P. Balasubrahmanyam, Vani Jairam

== Reception ==
Kalki said the music by Narasimhan was "okay", and lauded the cinematography by Dinesh Baboo. Balumani of Anna praised acting, humour, music, cinematography and direction.
