= Yaman Kalyan =

Hindustani classical raga related to Yaman

Yaman
- Thaat: Kalyan
- Time of day: Pratham prahar (6-9 in evening)
- Arohana: S-Re-Ga-Ma(tivra)-Pa-Dha-Ni-Sa
- Similar: Yaman

Yaman Kalyan is a Hindustani classical raga, related to Yaman. The movement of this raga is like Yaman, except that in the descent, it gently touches the flat madhyam using the GmG pattern occasionally.

== Description ==
Ustad Dhyanesh Khan used to say that the sharp madhyam in Yaman Kalyan is like the beautiful face of a veiled woman that comes out of the veil occasionally but disappears behind it almost instantaneously.

As it is related to Yaman, it is a part of the Kalyan thaat.

== Compositions ==
- Bhavayami GopalaBalam by Annamacharya
- Aaj Jane Ki Zid Na Karo by Fayyaz Hashmi

== Film Songs ==
=== Tamil ===
Song	Movie	Composer	Singer
Sindhanai Sei Maname	Ambikapathy	G. Ramanathan	T. M. Soundararajan
Ennarumai Kadhalikku Vennilaave	Ellarum Innattu Mannar	T. G. Lingappa	T. M. Soundararajan
Vennila Vaanil Varum	Mannippu	S. M. Subbaiah Naidu	T. M. Soundararajan, P. Susheela
Mannavan Vandhaanadi	Thiruvarutchelvar	K. V. Mahadevan	P. Susheela
Naan Anuppuvadhu	Pesum Dheivam	K. V. Mahadevan	T. M. Soundararajan
Kan Pona Pokile	Panam Padaithavan	Viswanathan–Ramamoorthy	T. M. Soundararajan
Naan Enna Soliviten	Bale Pandiya	Viswanathan–Ramamoorthy	T. M. Soundararajan
Athikkai Kai Kai	Bale Pandiya	Viswanathan–Ramamoorthy	T. M. Soundararajan, P. B. Sreenivas, P. Susheela, K. Jamuna Rani
Indha Mandrathil Odi Varum	Policekaran Magal	Viswanathan–Ramamoorthy	P. B. Sreenivas, S. Janaki
Kalaimangai Uruvam Kandu	Maganey Kel	Viswanathan–Ramamoorthy	Sirkazhi Govindarajan, M. L. Vasanthakumari
Mugathil Mugam Paarkalam	Thanga Padhumai	Viswanathan–Ramamoorthy	T. M. Soundararajan, P. Leela
Vetkamaai Irukudhadi	Paar Magaley Paar	Viswanathan–Ramamoorthy	P. Leela, Soolamangalam Rajalakshmi
Paar Magale Paar	Paar Magaley Paar	Viswanathan–Ramamoorthy	T. M. Soundararajan, M. S. Viswanathan
Maalai Soodum Mananaal	Nichaya Thaamboolam	Viswanathan–Ramamoorthy	P. Susheela
Isaikettal puvi	Thavapudhalavan	M. S. Viswanathan	T. M. Soundararajan
Madhurayil Parantha	Poova Thalaiya	M. S. Viswanathan	T. M. Soundararajan
Kettadhum Koduppavane Krishna	Deiva Magan	M. S. Viswanathan	T. M. Soundararajan
Chithirai Maadham	Raman Ethanai Ramanadi	M. S. Viswanathan	P. Susheela
Kannan Vandhan	Ramu	M. S. Viswanathan	Seerkazhi Govindarajan, T. M. Soundararajan
Azhagenum Ooviyam	Oorukku Uzhaippavan	M. S. Viswanathan	K. J. Yesudas, P. Susheela
Varuvaan Vadivelan	Varuvan Vadivelan	M. S. Viswanathan	Vani Jairam
Then Sindhuthey	Ponnukku Thanga Manasu	G. K. Venkatesh	S. P. Balasubrahmanyam, S. Janaki
Sundari Kannal Oru Seithi	Thalapathy	Ilaiyaraaja	S. P. Balasubrahmanyam, S. Janaki
Yamunai Aatrile	Thalapathy	Ilaiyaraaja	Mitali Banerjee Bhawmik
Vellai Pura Onru	Puthukavithai	Ilaiyaraaja	K. J. Yesudas, S. Janaki
Kannale Kadhal Kavithai	Athma	Ilaiyaraaja	K. J. Yesudas, S. Janaki
Vaidhegi Raman	Pagal Nilavu	Ilaiyaraaja	S. Janaki
Janani Janani	Thaai Mookaambikai	Ilaiyaraaja	Ilaiyaraaja
Maname Avan Vazhum	Pagalil Pournami	Ilaiyaraaja	Ilaiyaraaja
Nathiyil Aadum	Kaadhal Oviyam	Ilaiyaraaja	S. P. Balasubrahmanyam, S. Janaki, Deepan Chakravarthy
Devan Thantha Veenai	Unnai Naan Santhithen	Ilaiyaraaja	S. P. Balasubrahmanyam (Solo Ver), (P. Jayachandran, S. Janaki) (Duet Ver)
Oru Vanavil pole	Kaatrinile Varum Geetham	Ilaiyaraaja	P. Jayachandran, S. Janaki
Devan Kovil Deepam ondru	Naan Paadum Paadal	Ilaiyaraaja	S. N. Surendar, S. Janaki
Aararo Aararo	Anand	Ilaiyaraaja	Lata Mangeshkar
Malaiyoram Mayile	Oruvar Vaazhum Aalayam	Ilaiyaraaja	Malaysia Vasudevan, K. S. Chitra
Siru Koottile Ulla	Paandi Nattu Thangam	Ilaiyaraaja	K. S. Chitra, Mano
Naan Embathu Nee Allava	Soora Samhaaram	Ilaiyaraaja	Arunmozhi, K. S. Chithra
Odai Kuyil Oru	Thalattu Padava	Ilaiyaraaja	Arunmozhi, K. S. Chithra
Amma Endruzhakatha	Mannan	Ilaiyaraaja	K. J. Yesudas
Kalaivaniye	Sindhu Bhairavi	Ilaiyaraaja	K. J. Yesudas
Oru Maalai Chandiran	Unnai Vaazhthi Paadugiren	Ilaiyaraaja	S. P. Balasubrahmanyam, Minmini
Kaatril Varum Geethame	Oru Naal Oru Kanavu	Ilaiyaraaja	Ilaiyaraaja, Hariharan, Shreya Ghoshal, Sadhana Sargam, Bhavatharini
Nirpathuve Nadapathuve	Bharathi	Ilaiyaraaja	Harish Raghavendra
Yaar Veetil Roja	Idaya Kovil	Ilaiyaraaja	S. P. Balasubrahmanyam
Vanthal Mahalakshmi	Uyarndha Ullam	Ilaiyaraaja	S. P. Balasubrahmanyam
Vizhigal Meeno	Raagangal Maaruvathillai	Ilaiyaraaja	S. P. Balasubrahmanyam
Aazh Kadalil	Raagam Thedum Pallavi	T. Rajendar	S. P. Balasubrahmanyam
Pasamalare	Neethibathi	Gangai Amaran	T. M. Soundararajan, P.Susheela
Vaigai nathiyil oru Paravai	Natchathiram	Shankar–Ganesh	S. Janaki
Yaradhu Sollamal Nenjalli	Nenjamellam Neeye	Shankar–Ganesh	Vani Jairam
Om Ganapathiye Ganapathiye	Marumagal	Chandrabose	Vani Jairam & Chorus
Varaga Nadhikaraiyoram	Sangamam	A. R. Rahman	Shankar Mahadevan
Azhagu Nilave	Pavithra	A. R. Rahman	K. S. Chitra
Enthan Vaanil	Kadhal Virus	A. R. Rahman	S. P. Balasubrahmanyam, Swarnalatha (Humming only)
Kadhal Niagara	En Swasa Kaatre	A. R. Rahman	Palakkad Sreeram, Harini, Annupamaa
Neethan En Desiya Geetham	Paarthale Paravasam	A. R. Rahman	P. Balram, K. S. Chitra
Sakthi Kodu	Baba	A. R. Rahman	Karthik
Methuvagathan	Kochadaiiyaan	A. R. Rahman	S. P. Balasubrahmanyam, Sadhana Sargam
Ey Maanburu Mangaiye	Guru	A. R. Rahman	Srinivas, Sujatha Mohan, A. R. Rahman
Yaarumilla Thaniarangil	Kaaviya Thalaivan	A. R. Rahman	Swetha Mohan, Srinivas
Kathal Ennum Keerthanam	En Aasai Rasathi	Dr. Chandilyan	S. P. Balasubrahmanyam, K. S. Chitra
Mudhan Mudhalil	Aahaa..!	Deva	Hariharan, K. S. Chitra
Gokulathu kanna	Gokulathil Seethai	Deva	S. P. Balasubrahmanyam, K. S. Chitra, Deva
Enthan Uyire Enthan Uyire	Unnaruge Naan Irundhal	Deva	Krishnaraj, K. S. Chitra
Katrin Mozhi	Mozhi	Vidyasagar	Balram, Sujatha Mohan
Pudhu Malar Thottu	Poovellam Un Vasam	Vidyasagar	Sriram Parthasarathy
Naan Mozhi Arindhen	Kanden Kadhalai	Vidyasagar	Suresh Wadkar
Oru Theithi Paarthal	Coimbatore Mappillai	Vidyasagar	Hariharan, Sadhana Sargam
Yen Pennendru	Love Today	Shiva	Mohammed Aslam, Bombay Jayashri
Kaadhal Aasai	Anjaan	Yuvan Shankar Raja	Yuvan Shankar Raja, Sooraj Santhosh
Never let me go	Pyaar Prema Kaadhal	Yuvan Shankar Raja	Suranjan, Shweta Pandit
Vizhigalin Aruginil	Azhagiya Theeye	Ramesh Vinayakam	
Kannanai Thedi	Marupadiyum Oru Kadhal	Srikanth Deva	Shreya Ghoshal
Mun Andhi	7 Aum Arivu	Harris Jayaraj	Karthik, Megha
Mellinamae Mellinamae	Shahjahan	Mani Sharma	Harish Raghavendra
Ennena Seidhom Ingu	Mayakkam Enna	G. V. Prakash Kumar	Harish Raghavendra
Yen Aala Paakkaporaen	Kayal	D. Imman	Shreya Ghoshal, Ranjith
Sara Sara Saara Kaathu	Vaagai Sooda Vaa	Ghibran	Chinmayi
