= Udaya Geetham =

1985 film by K. Rangaraj

- Theatrical release poster
- Directed by: K. Rangaraj
- Screenplay by: K. Rangaraj
- Story by: R. Selvaraj
- Produced by: Kovaithambi
- Starring: Mohan; Lakshmi; Revathi
- Cinematography: Dinesh Babu
- Edited by: R. Bhaskaran
- Music by: Ilaiyaraaja
- Production company: Motherland Pictures
- Release date: 13 April 1985
- Country: India
- Language: Tamil

Udhaya Geetham (/uðəjəɡiːðəm/ transl. Morning hymn) is a 1985 Indian Tamil-language thriller film directed by K. Rangaraj and produced by Kovaithambi. The film stars Mohan, Lakshmi and Revathi, with Goundamani, Senthil, Anand Babu, and Prathapachandran in supporting roles. It revolves around a singer who is facing a death sentence for a murder he did not commit, and the efforts of a young girl to clear his name. The film was released on 13 April 1985 and was a commercial success, running for 148 days in theatres and thereby becoming a silver jubilee film.

== Plot ==
Arun is a singer sentenced to death. He meets Shanthi, a fan, during one of his concerts and she follows him on many occasions both within and outside prison. Arun shows deep animosity towards Shanthi's behaviour and continuously shuns her, but a persistent Shanthi refuses to give up. Maari, an inmate, attempts a prison escape but is stopped by Arun. He tells Arun about his sick daughter, and his inability to pay for her operation. A sympathetic Arun promises to raise funds for the sick child through his next concert, which he also plans shall be his final one.

Leela Chowdhry is the newly appointed Superintendent of Police for the Madras Central Jail, where Arun is imprisoned. Shanthi talks her into getting her married to Arun, who also agrees to it after deeply thinking and deliberating. The wedding takes places in Leela's house. During their wedding night, Shanthi stabs Arun and reveals herself as the sister of Anand, for whose murder Arun was convicted. Anand was Arun's musical partner in their troupe before his murder. Arun claims he was wrongfully convicted and Shanthi, believing him, promises to clear his name.

Leela allows Shanthi and Arun to go to a nearby temple, but sends policemen along with them to prevent Arun from escaping. Shanthi outsmarts them and takes Arun to her home where she imprisons him, much to his dislike. She makes it seemingly impossible for him to escape, until she is able to prove his innocence. Leela is later punished for having let Arun "escape", and simultaneously realises that Arun is her long lost son, becoming heartbroken. However, she remains bound to her duty of capturing Arun, and a manhunt for him begins.

Shanthi later meets Shankar, the real killer of Anand. He admits to the murder, but states that did so because he witnessed Anand sleeping with his wife. Shanthi, knowing that Shankar's wife is promiscuous (it was she who seduced the reluctant Anand), takes him to her and Shankar is angered on seeing his wife with another man in bed. He kills her, but not before she mortally wounds him. Arun, having escaped, is confronted by Leela who he realises is his mother. She allows him to perform his final concert, but has to have him hanged to death him after that. Right after he finishes his concert he is arrested, but Shanthi and Shankar finally arrive and tell the truth about Anand's death, after which Shankar succumbs. Arun's death sentence is revoked.

== Cast ==
- Mohan as Arun
- Lakshmi as Leela Chowdhry
- Revathi as Shanthi
- Goundamani as Balaji
- Anand Babu as Anand Babu
- Prathapachandran as Shankar
- Poornam Vishwanathan as Doctor
- Kallapetti Singaram
- Senthil as Senthil, an inmate
- J. Lalitha as Amudha
- Disco Shanti as Raani
- T. K. S. Natarajan
- Sarath Babu as Arun's father (Photographic Appearance)
- Kovai Sarala as a police officer's daughter (Guest Appearance)
- Shekhina Shawn as the sick child

== Production ==
After the success of Unnai Naan Santhithen (1984), producer Kovaithambi and director K. Rangaraj decided to reunite for another film. The film was titled Udaya Geetham because Kovaithambi had a "sentiment" for the letter 'U', as with Unnai Naan Santhithen. The comedy subplot involving Goundamani as a fake swami and Senthil as an inmate was written by A. Veerappan.

== Soundtrack ==
The soundtrack was composed by Ilaiyaraaja, this being his 300th film. The song "Thene Thenpaandi" is set in the Carnatic raga known as Sankarabharanam, "Paadu Nilavae" is set in the Kusumadharini raga, and the title song is set in Dhenuka.

Tamil Track listing
No.	Title	Lyrics	Singer(s)	Length
1.	"Sangeetha Megam"	Muthulingam	S. P. Balasubrahmanyam	4:28
2.	"Paadu Nilavae"	Mu. Metha	S. P. Balasubrahmanyam, S. Janaki	5:02
3.	"Ennodu Paattu Paadungal"	M. G. Vallabhan	S. P. Balasubrahmanyam	5:58
4.	"Thene Thenpaandi" (male)	Vaali	S.P. Balasubrahmanyam	4:12
5.	"Uthaya Geetham"	Vairamuthu	S. P. Balasubrahmanyam	4:49
6.	"Thene Thenpaandi" (female)	Vaali	S. Janaki	3:22
7.	"Maane Thene"	Na. Kamarasan	S. P. Balasubrahmanyam, S. Janaki	4:19
Total length:				32:10

The movie was dubbed into Telugu with same title Udaya Geetham and lyrics were written by Rajashri

Telugu (dubbed) Track listing
No.	Title	Singer(s)	Length
1.	"Sangeetha Bhaavam"	S. P. Balasubrahmanyam	4:28
2.	"Palikinchave Nee Kavita"	S. P. Balasubrahmanyam, S. P. Sailaja	5:02
3.	"Eeroju Pata Padali"	S. P. Balasubrahmanyam	5:58
4.	"Lali Aa Pala Velli" (male)	S.P. Balasubrahmanyam	4:12
5.	"Uthaya Geetham Padana"	S. P. Balasubrahmanyam
6.	"Lali Na Pala Velli" (female)	P. Susheela	3:22
7.	"Pade Ede Adenule"	S. P. Balasubrahmanyam, S. P. Sailaja	4:19
Total length:			32:10

== Release and reception ==
Udaya Geetham was released on 13 April 1985, a day before Puthandu. Despite facing competition from other Mohan films released in the same week such as Pillai Nila and Deivapiravi, the film became a commercial success, with a theatrical run of over 148 days, thereby becoming a silver jubilee film. Kalki criticised the film for numerous plot holes, but praised Ilaiyaraaja's music and Rangaraj's direction. Balumani of Anna praised acting, humour, music, cinematography and direction.

== Bibliography ==
- Balabharathi (2012). தமிழ் சினிமா 80 பாகம்-2 [Tamil Cinema 80 Part-2] (in Tamil). Chennai: Nakkheeran Publications. ISBN 978-93-81828-41-0.
- Sundararaman (2007) [2005]. Raga Chintamani: A Guide to Carnatic Ragas Through Tamil Film Music (2nd ed.). Pichhamal Chintamani. OCLC 295034757.
