= Ponnu Oorukku Pudhusu =

- Poster
- Directed by: R. Selvaraj
- Written by: R. Selvaraj
- Produced by: K. N. Subbaiah
- Starring: Sudhakar; Vijayan; Saritha; S. Vijayalakshmi
- Cinematography: K. Vasudev
- Edited by: T. Thirunavukkarasu
- Music by: Ilaiyaraaja
- Production company: United International
- Release date: 5 May 1979
- Country: India
- Language: Tamil

Ponnu Oorukku Pudhusu (transl. The girl is new to town) is a 1979 Indian Tamil-language film written and directed by R. Selvaraj in his directorial debut. The film stars Sudhakar, Vijayan, Saritha and S. Vijayalakshmi. It was released on 5 May 1979 and became a success.

== Plot ==
The film deals with the problems Rukmani faces when she comes to a new town. Pichaimuthu loves her but Rukmani wants to go to a new place for work. What happens to Rukmani and how she got along with Pichaimuthu forms the crux of the story.

== Cast ==
- Sudhakar as Pichaimuthu
- Vijayan as the gambler
- Saritha as Rukmani
- S. Vijayalakshmi as Panchavarnam
- Chandrahasan
- Chakravarthy
- Kabir Das
- Ceylon Chinnaiah
- Solai
- Kullamani
- Madurai Sri Jayanthi
- Nisha
- S. R. Vijaya
- Roopa Sowda
- Madurai S. P. Meena
- Anuradha
- Kamala
- Murugan as a police constable

== Production ==
Ponnu Oorukku Pudhusu marked the directorial debut of screenwriter R. Selvaraj. He decided on Sudhakar as the lead actor after being impressed with his performance in Kizhakke Pogum Rail (1978). The film was launched at AVM Studios in December 1978. Vasu, who previously assisted R. N. K. Prasad, made his debut as cinematographer. Roopa Sowda, a student of Adyar Film Institute, made her acting debut with the film. Most of the filming was done at Bodinayakanur. Selvaraj initially planned to shoot the film within 25 days, but since Sudhakar was busy with many films he could provide only less dates so Selvaraj shot all his scenes with Saritha within seven days.

== Soundtrack ==
The music was composed by Ilaiyaraaja. The song "Oru Manjakkuruvi" is set to the Carnatic raga Sankarabharanam, "Oram Po" and "Samakozhi" are set to Kharaharapriya, and "Solaikkuyile" is set to Madhyamavati. "Solaikkuyile" was the debut Tamil song of S. P. Sailaja and the debut song of lyricist M. G. Vallabhan.

"Oram Po" was banned by All India Radio due to the alleged vulgar nature of its lyrics; it has been suggested that the actual reason was due to the song's interpretation as an anti-caste allegory. According to Thuraivan, then the director of Chennai Radio Station, the song had no lyrical value; it gave a feeling of listening to dialogues rather than a song. Politician J. Jayalalithaa, then an actress, condemned the ban in an article for Thuglak, and called out other Tamil newspapers for not doing the same. The song was remixed by D. Imman in Ainthaam Padai (2009).

Track listing
No.	Title	Lyrics	Singer(s)	Length
1.	"Oram Po"	Gangai Amaran	Ilaiyaraaja, Sudhakar	5:02
2.	"Samakozhi"	Panchu Arunachalam	Ilaiyaraaja, S. P. Sailaja	3:51
3.	"Oru Manjakkuruvi"	Panchu Arunachalam	Ilaiyaraaja	2:57
4.	"Unakkenathanae"	Gangai Amaran	Ilaiyaraaja, Sarala, Vidhyadhar	4:49
5.	"Veettukku Oru Magane"	Muthulingam	Ilaiyaraaja	3:40
6.	"Solaikkuyile"	M. G. Vallabhan	S. P. Sailaja	4:09
Total length:				24:28

== Release and reception ==
Ponnu Oorukku Pudhusu was released on 5 May 1979. Kousigan of Kalki felt the director added too many ideas in one film; none of them feels compelling and complete but praised the cinematography. The film was one of the most successful Tamil films of the year.

== Bibliography ==
- Sundararaman (2007) [2005]. Raga Chintamani: A Guide to Carnatic Ragas Through Tamil Film Music (2nd ed.). Pichhamal Chintamani. OCLC 295034757.
