= Agal Vilakku =

1979 film

- Title card
- Directed by: R. Selvaraj
- Written by: R. Selvaraj
- Produced by: R. C. Ashok
- Starring: Shoba; Vijayakanth
- Cinematography: K. Vasudevan
- Edited by: T. R. Natarajan
- Music by: Ilaiyaraaja
- Production company: Sunil Pictures
- Release date: 7 December 1979
- Country: India
- Language: Tamil

Agal Vilakku (transl. Clay lamp) is a 1979 Indian Tamil-language film written and directed by R. Selvaraj. The film stars Shoba and Vijayakanth. It was released on 7 December 1979.

== Plot ==
Navaneetham is an orphan living with her cruel aunt and hapless uncle. She sells idlis at the local hospital to support herself and her family. The doctor, Jayalakshmi, puts the wellbeing of her patients above all else. Jayalakshmi's fiancé proves himself to be a suspicious coward and she calls off the wedding to focus on her patients. Dhanushkodi is admitted to the hospital after he is beaten up for standing up for workers' rights. He and Navaneetham quickly fall in love and marry though her aunt and his entire family disapprove. Dhanushkodi does not have a regular job as he is more interested in righting societal wrongs than his household.

Navaneetham returns to selling idlis to make ends meet and gets hurt. This spurs Dhanushkodi to run for office and he becomes the mayor. Their financial situation improves and he can now make meaningful positive changes to society. Dhanushkodi's family see this as an opportunity to get rich by accepting bribes using his name. They do this but connive to make Navaneetham look like the culprit. When Dhanushkodi learns of the corruption, he resigns his post and separates from his wife. Navaneetham and Jayalakshmi work together to uncover the truth.

== Cast ==
- Shoba as Navaneetham
- Vijayakanth as Dhanushkodi
- Kullamani as Mani
- Srilekha Rajendran as Jayalakshmi

== Production ==
Agal Vilakku is Vijayakanth's second film as actor, and first in a leading role.

== Soundtrack ==
The soundtrack was composed by Ilaiyaraaja. The song "Ottukettu", written by Pavalar Varadharajan and sung by Ilaiyaraaja only appears on the film's LP records. The song "Yedho Ninaivugal" was adapted from "Bhanu Bhoomiya", which Ilaiyaraaja had composed for the Kannada film Maathu Tappada Maga (1978). The song is based on Sumanesa Ranjani raga.

Track listing
No.	Title	Lyrics	Singer(s)	Length
1.	"Ellorum Porandhome"	Gangai Amaran	Malaysia Vasudevan, Saibaba and Chorus	4:19
2.	"Maalai Nera Kaatre"	Muthulingam	S. Janaki	4:29
3.	"Nee Kannil Vaazhum"	M. G. Vallabhan	B. S. Saisrekha	4:51
4.	"Yedho Ninaivugal"	Gangai Amaran	K. J. Yesudas, S. P. Sailaja	4:19
Total length:				17:58

== Reception ==
Kalki negatively reviewed the film, particularly for the story.
