= Mangai Oru Gangai =

- Theatrical release poster
- Directed by: T. Hariharan
- Screenplay by: T. Hariharan
- Story by: Motherland Pictures Story Department
- Produced by: Kovaithambi
- Starring: Saritha; Nadhiya
- Cinematography: U. Rajagopal
- Edited by: M. S. Money
- Music by: Laxmikant–Pyarelal
- Production company: Motherland Pictures
- Release date: 24 July 1987
- Country: India
- Language: Tamil

Mangai Oru Gangai is a 1987 Indian Tamil-language legal drama film directed by T. Hariharan and produced by Kovaithambi. The film stars Saritha and Nadhiya. It was released on 24 July 1987.

== Plot ==
Radha Ranganathan, an advocate, becomes cynical after failing to get a criminal convicted for the murder of her brother-in-law.

== Cast ==
- Saritha as Radha Ranganathan
- Nadhiya as Nancy Narayanaswamy
- Suresh as Vijay
- Charan Raj as Charan Raj
- Poornam Viswanathan as Judge
- Sivachandran as Manickam
- Prathapachandran as Mohanasundaram
- Kamala Kamesh as Aaya
- Uma Rani as Nirmala
- Babloo Prithiveeraj as Ashok
- Sethu Vinayagam as Durairaj
- Meesai Murugesan

== Production ==
Mangai Oru Gangai was directed by T. Hariharan and produced by Kovaithambi of Motherland Pictures. Hariharan also wrote the screenplay, based on a story by Motherland Pictures' Story Department, and the dialogue was written by M. G. Vallabhan. Cinematography was handled by U. Rajagopal, and editing by M. S. Money.

== Soundtrack ==
The soundtrack was composed by the duo Laxmikant–Pyarelal.

Track listing
No.	Title	Lyrics	Singer(s)	Length
1.	"Azhaghyiya Nilavidhu"	Metha	S. P. Balasubrahmanyam, K. S. Chithra	6:10
2.	"Odam Ithu Odatume"	Pulamaipithan	S. P. Balasubrahmanyam, S. Janaki	5:54
3.	"Neeradi Vaa Thenrale"	M. G. Vallabhan	Dinesh, Chorus	7:14
4.	"Kathal Panna Kathu Kodupen"	Pulamaipithan	S. Janaki	5:24
5.	"Achamilla Pathaliel"	Muthulingam	K. S. Chithra	5:37
6.	"Neeradi Vaa Thenrale"	M. G. Vallabhan	S. Janaki	5:49
Total length:				36:08

== Release and reception ==
Mangai Oru Gangai was released on 24 July 1987. On 7 August, N. Krishnaswamy of The Indian Express wrote, "I was pleased that the makers of the film had done their homework on the script and had here something that was intellectually simulating", and praised the performances of Saritha, Charan Raj, Nadhiya and Viswanathan. Jayamanmadhan of Kalki, however, reviewed the film more negatively, feeling the court scenes were excessively stretched and inducing uncontrollable yawn. Balumani of Anna praised acting, cinematography, music, dialogues.
