= Ambigai Neril Vanthaal =

- Title card
- Directed by: Manivannan
- Story by: P. Kalaimani
- Produced by: Chitra Lakshmanan; Chitra Ramu
- Starring: Mohan; Radha; Urvashi
- Cinematography: Karthik–Ashok
- Edited by: L. Kesavan
- Music by: Ilaiyaraaja
- Production company: Ram Arts
- Release date: 8 December 1984
- Country: India
- Language: Tamil

Ambigai Neril Vanthaal (transl. Ambika came in person) is a 1984 Indian Tamil-language drama film directed by Manivannan, starring Mohan, Radha and Urvashi. It was released on 8 December 1984.

== Plot ==
Devaki is persuaded to marry Ravi. However, the marriage deteriorates for her when she discovers that Ravi is a drunkard and a womaniser. Ravi seems to be a womaniser and he had a son with Devaki.

Consequently, he hides his marriage life and he plans to marry another girl(character played by Urvashi).But he is caught on the occasion of his father's illness and this whole chaos came to be known by all.

Despite this, Devaki tells the court that she is a 'thaasi' and seems to leave him with their son, but he shouts to her not to leave and this seems to be end as he confessed his faults and apologies for his mistakes.

== Cast ==
- Mohan
- Radha
- Urvashi
- Sangeeta
- Ambika (cameo)
- Vanitha
- Y. G. Mahendran
- Janagaraj
- Senthil
- V. K. Ramasamy
- Sathya

== Soundtrack ==
The soundtrack was composed by Ilaiyaraaja.

Song	Singers	Lyrics
"Annai Thaalaattu Paada"	P. Susheela	Vairamuthu
"Ithu Ilamai"	S. Janaki, Ramesh	Muthulingam
"Kalyaana Chelai"	S. P. Balasubrahmanyam, Devie Neithiyar	Panchu Arunachalam
"Kanni Thene"	Ramesh, Vani Jairam	Gangai Amaran
"Maamaa Maalai"	S. Janaki	M. G. Vallabhan

== Reception ==
Jayamanmadhan of Kalki felt the scenes were dragged but praised the acting of Radha.
