= Kovaithambi =

Indian film producer and politician

- Born: 28 November 1940 (age 85); Coimbatore, Tamil Nadu, India
- Education: R. S. Puram Corporation Boys Higher Secondary School
- Occupations: Film producer, politician
- Years active: 1981–present
- Spouse: Sita

Kovaithambi (born 28 November 1940) is an Indian film producer and politician who was active primarily in the 1980s, in Tamil cinema.

== Early life ==
Kovaithambi was born on 28 November 1940 to Perumal Udayar and Sunthayi Ammal, a farming couple belonging to the Udayar caste. He did his schooling at the R. S. Puram Corporation Boys Higher Secondary School, Coimbatore. During that period, he was fascinated by the speeches of politicians such as M. G. Ramachandran, C. N. Annadurai, M. Karunanidhi, E. V. K. Sampath, V. R. Nedunchezhiyan, Nanjil K. Manoharan and K. Anbazhagan. He also wrote and starred in many school plays.

== Career ==
=== Politics ===
Kovaithambi joined the All India Anna Dravida Munnetra Kazhagam (AIADMK) when it was formed by M. G. Ramachandran. Between 1977 and 1986, Kovaithambi served as the AIADMK's Coimbatore District Secretary. From 1980 to 1984, he served as the Perur constituency MLA. Kovaithambi left the AIADMK in 1988, following the death of Ramachandran in 1987. As of 2009, Kovaithambi was the state executive president of the Tamil Nadu Parkava Kula Sangam (TNPKS), an "umbrella body for the Udayar, Moopanar and Nainar communities".

=== Cinema ===
In 1981, Kovaithambi established Motherland Pictures, and the first film produced by this company was R. Sundarrajan's directorial debut Payanangal Mudivathillai (1982), which became a silver jubilee hit; Kovaithambi was credited for the film's story. He went on to produce more commercially successful films in the 1980s including Ilamai Kaalangal (1983), Idaya Kovil (1985), and Udaya Geetham (1985). After Chembaruthi (1992), Kovaithambi took a sabbatical from producing. In 2008, he attempted a comeback with Yen Ippadi Mayakinay, which ultimately never released; Kovaithambi's comeback film instead became Uyirukku Uyiraga (2014).

== Personal life ==
Kovaithambi is married to Sita. Both are founders of Motherland Matriculation Higher Secondary School.

== Filmography ==
Year	Film	Ref.
1982	Payanangal Mudivathillai	
1983	Ilamai Kaalangal	
1984	Naan Paadum Paadal	
1984	Unnai Naan Santhithen	
1985	Udaya Geetham	
1985	Idaya Kovil	
1986	Uyire Unakkaga	
1986	Aayiram Pookkal Malarattum	
1986	Mannukkul Vairam	
1987	Mangai Oru Gangai	
1988	Uzhaithu Vaazha Vendum	
1992	Unnai Vaazhthi Paadugiren	
1992	Chembaruthi	
2014	Uyirukku Uyiraga	
