= Saveray Wali Gaadi =

1985 film by Bharathiraja

- Theatrical release poster
- Directed by: Bharathiraja
- Screenplay by: Bharathiraja
- Dialogues by: Dr. Rahi Masoom Raza
- Story by: R. Selvaraj
- Based on: Kizhakke Pogum Rail by Bharathiraja
- Produced by: R. K. Soral
- Starring: Sunny Deol; Poonam Dhillon; Natasha Sinha; Prem Chopra; Bindu
- Cinematography: B. Kannan
- Edited by: David Dhawan
- Music by: R. D. Burman
- Production company: Suyog Films
- Distributed by: Suyog Films
- Release date: 17 September 1985
- Country: India
- Language: Hindi

Saveray Wali Gaadi (transl. The morning train) is a 1985 Indian romantic drama film directed by Bharathiraja. The film stars Sunny Deol and Poonam Dhillon. It is a remake of Bharathiraja's Tamil film Kizhakke Pogum Rail.

== Plot ==
In a small village in rural India, Ravi Das, a gifted young poet, lives with his respected father, Chhediram. Ravi is in love with Jyoti, a love that defies their different castes and is met with strong opposition from the villagers.

One day, while Ravi and Jyoti are talking privately, a group of villagers falsely accuse Ravi of molesting her. At a village council, or panchayat meeting, Ravi is sentenced to a public humiliation: his head is shaved, and he is paraded through the village on a donkey. Unable to bear the shame, his father, Chhediram, tragically commits suicide.

Heartbroken and determined to prove his worth, Ravi leaves for the city to pursue his dream of becoming a published poet and to one day return for Jyoti. In the city, he recovers the purse of a young woman named Rama. Rama turns out to be the daughter of Jankidas, a wealthy newspaper publisher. Impressed by Ravi’s talent after hearing about his poems, Jankidas offers him a column in his newspaper. Ravi's poems are a success, and he soon becomes famous, his dream of recognition finally fulfilled.

Meanwhile, Ravi and Jyoti stay connected through secret messages. Ravi writes to her on the side of the morning express train, earning the film its title, "Saveraywali Gaadi" (The Morning Train). Every day, Jyoti reads his words, hoping for his return.

Back in the village, Jyoti's brother-in-law, Kishanlal, lusts after her. He tries to pressure the village council into letting him marry Jyoti, claiming he and his wife, Sukhdai (Jyoti's older sister), are unable to have children. Major Sher Singh, a retired military man and a staunch opponent of injustice, speaks out against Kishanlal. To save her marriage, Sukhdai begs Jyoti to accept Kishanlal's proposal, leaving Jyoti devastated. Distraught, Jyoti scrawls a message for Ravi on the train with chalk, begging him to return. But a sudden rainstorm washes the message away before it reaches the city.

One evening, a torrential rainstorm—the likes of which the village hasn't seen in 50 years—causes a flood. The village priest, or Pandit, claims the storm can only be stopped by performing a special ritual to appease the goddess. The ritual requires an unmarried girl to walk naked through the village at midnight, while all men must remain indoors. The girl is to be chosen by a lottery.

Major Sher Singh is furious at the suggestion but is ignored by the panicked villagers. Privately, a man named Gupta expresses concern to the Pandit that his daughter's reputation would be ruined if she were chosen. The Pandit, a cunning man, seizes this opportunity and conspires against Jyoti. He rigs the lottery, ensuring her name is on every single slip of paper. As expected, Jyoti's name is drawn, and she refuses to participate.

Suddenly, the rain stops on its own. The villagers rejoice, believing the goddess has been appeased simply by their intention to perform the ritual. Kishanlal suggests they cancel the ceremony, but the Pandit insists that if they don't complete the ritual, the storm will return. The village women force Jyoti to agree for the good of the community.

In the city, Ravi, having confided in Rama about his love for Jyoti, decides it's time to return. As he arrives in the village late that night, he sees Jyoti on the street, preparing for the ritual. Enraged, he runs to her, covering her with his clothes and shouting at the villagers. The village Sarpanch, orders the villagers to kill Ravi.

Ravi and Jyoti take refuge in a temple, then flee towards the train station. They are cornered by the mob, but Major Sher Singh bravely intervenes, fighting off the villagers to buy them time. Tragically, he is killed in the struggle, a final sacrifice for their love. Ravi and Jyoti manage to board the train just in time, escaping the village forever. As the train pulls away, they embrace, finally free to live a happy new life together.

== Cast ==
- Sunny Deol as Ravi Das – Jyoti's boyfriend
- Poonam Dhillon as Jyoti – Ravi’s girlfriend
- Natasha Sinha as Rama
- Prem Chopra as Kishanlal
- Bindu as Sukhdai
- Shreeram Lagoo as Chhediram
- Dharmendra (special Appearance) as Retd. Major Sher Singh
- Om Shivpuri as Thakur – Village Sarpanch
- Kiran Vairale as Pushpa
- Satyen Kappu as Gupta ji
- C. S. Dubey as Pandit
- Jankidas as Jankidas
- Rupali Ganguly (uncredited)

== Production ==
The film was completed during the production of Betaab (1983), but Dharmendra postponed the release of the film after he felt the film would not be commercially successful.

== Music and soundtrack ==
The music was composed by R. D. Burman and the lyrics were penned by Majrooh Sultanpuri.

Song	Singer
"Jab Do Pyar Milte Hain"	Kishore Kumar
"Sanjh Pade Gaaye Deewana"	Kishore Kumar
"Din Pyar Ke Aayenge"	Lata Mangeshkar
"Bin Payal Ke Chham Chham"	Suresh Wadkar
"Dekho Yeh Kaun Aaya, Mujhko Uda Laya"	Suresh Wadkar, Asha Bhosle
