= Puthiya Vaarpugal =

1979 film by Bharathiraja

- Theatrical release poster
- Directed by: Bharathiraja
- Screenplay by: Bharathiraja; Bhagyaraj
- Story by: R. Selvaraj
- Produced by: Bharathiraja
- Starring: Bhagyaraj; Rati
- Cinematography: P. S. Nivas
- Edited by: R. Bhaskaran
- Music by: Ilaiyaraaja
- Production company: Manoj Creations
- Distributed by: Sri Abhirami Films
- Release date: 14 April 1979
- Running time: 143 minutes
- Country: India
- Language: Tamil

Puthiya Vaarpugal (transl. New Mouldings) is a 1979 Indian Tamil-language romantic drama film directed, produced and co-written by Bharathiraja. The film stars K. Bhagyaraj and Rati Agnihotri, with G. Srinivasan, Goundamani, K. K. Soundar and Usharani in supporting roles. It revolves around a schoolteacher who falls in love with a woman in his village, but their relationship is threatened by the lecherous village chief.

Puthiya Vaarpugal is the first film produced by Bharathiraja. It also marked the acting debut of Agnihotri, and the first film for Bhagyaraj as a lead actor. While the story was written by R. Selvaraj, Bharathiraja wrote the screenplay and Bhagyaraj wrote the dialogues. Cinematography was handled by P. S. Nivas and editing by R. Bhaskaran. Filming was completed in 22 working days.

Puthiya Vaarpugal was released on 14 April 1979. The film became a success and won two Tamil Nadu State Film Awards: Second Best Film and Best Dialogue Writer (Bhagyaraj). It was remade in Telugu as Kotha Jeevithalu (1981) by the same director.

== Plot ==
Shanmugamani comes to a village as a school teacher. Around the same time, another woman comes there as a social activist. They meet occasionally and exchange pleasantries and books as they are educated, and share common interests. Shanmugamani meets Jothi, daughter of the village temple musician and they fall in love with each other. The village chief is a lecherous man. His stooge Amavasai is keen to marry Jothi, but Jothi's father is uninterested in the proposal. When the chief sees Jothi, he lusts for her. Knowing about her love for Shanmugamani, he orders her to yield to his lust and threatens to fire Shanmugamani if she refuses. Jothi slaps him and the chief awaits an opportunity to take revenge. Meanwhile, Shanmugamani approaches Jothi's father with his marriage proposal, and he accepts. Enraged with this development, the chief plots revenge.

When the social activist visits the chief, he rapes and murders her, framing Shanmugamani. The chief alleges that the two had an illicit relationship; when she became pregnant, Shanmugamani killed her. The other villagers believe this and insult Shanmugamani. Though Jothi does not believe this, Shanmugamani leaves the village, leaving a note to Jothi that he would return to take her with him. When Jothi's father and brother are away, he makes Amavasai enter her house without her knowledge. When she is asleep, he knocks on her door along with other villagers. An unaware Jothi opens and says there is no one in her house until Amavasai emerges; the chief alleges an illicit relationship between Amavasai and Jothi, and orders their wedding as a solution. Though aware of the chief's plan, Jothi helplessly marries Amavasai, and her father dies shortly thereafter. Shanmugamani returns to take Jothi and learns about the wedding.

When Amavasai is eager to celebrate his wedding night, the chief orders him to leave as he himself wants Jothi. Amavasai pleads to spare his wife, to no avail. When the chief approaches Jothi, she willingly comes to him and they hug, only for Jothi to stab the chief to death, just as Shanmugamani and Amavasai arrive. Amavasai feels guilty for cheating and marrying her, so he removes the Thaali he tied and asks her to live happily with Shanmugamani. Amavasai hides the chief's corpse in a hay meant for torching during a festival and villagers burn it, oblivious to the corpse. Shamugamani and Jothi leave the village.

== Cast ==
- Bhagyaraj as Shanmugamani (voice dubbed by Gangai Amaran)
- Rati as Jothi
- G. Srinivasan as the village chief
- Goundamani as Amavasai
- K. K. Soundarajan as Jothi's father
- Usharani as the social activist
- Manobala as a panchayat member
- V. Janagaraj as the village chief's son
- Chandrasekharan as the prospective groom
- Master Raja Sheriff as Doraisamy
- Director Bala as a student in class room

== Production ==
=== Development ===
After director Bharathiraja scored three consecutive box-office hits: 16 Vayathinile (1977), Kizhakke Pogum Rail and Sigappu Rojakkal (both 1978), his mentor K. R. Gangadharan asked if he would be interested in taking to film production for his fourth; he agreed. Bharathiraja's then associate R. Selvaraj wrote the story of Puthiya Vaarpugal which Bharathiraja approved, making his debut as producer. Since the director did not have enough money, Gangadharan gave him an advance of ₹5,000 (equivalent to ₹140,000 or US$1,500 in 2026). The film's title was derived from a short story by Jayakanthan. While Bharathiraja wrote the screenplay, K. Bhagyaraj wrote the dialogues. Cinematography was handled by P. S. Nivas and editing by R. Bhaskaran.

=== Casting and filming ===
Puthiya Vaarpugal is the film debut of the then 16-year-old Rati Agnihotri; Bharathiraja decided on her as the lead actress after watching her performance in a school play. Agnihotri's father agreed to let her join the film after Bharathiraja promised to complete filming within a month. Bharathiraja said he chose Agnihotri because he wanted a woman who looked like a "sunflower in their midst". It is also the first film for Bhagyaraj as lead actor. Gangai Amaran was originally considered, but Bharathiraja later decided on Bhagyaraj. According to Bharathiraja, he was not cast until the day before filming began.

K. K. Soundar and G. Srinivasan were initially cast as the village chief and the female lead's father, respectively, but the director later switched their roles. This is the debut film for Chandrasekhar. Haja Sheriff was cast after a successful audition, during which he recited a dialogue from Manohara (1954); it is his debut film. Manobala made his acting debut with this film, and also worked as an assistant director. The song "Vaan Megangale" was filmed at Kumbakkarai Falls. Filming was completed in 22 working days. Amaran dubbed Bhagyaraj's voice as he was unavailable for dubbing sessions due to having to attend his mother's funeral. Hema Malini dubbed Agnihotri's voice.

== Soundtrack ==
The music was composed by Ilaiyaraaja. The song "Vaan Megangale" is set to the Carnatic raga Mohanam, "Idhayam Poguthe" is set to Keeravani, and "Thamthananam Thana" is set to Shanmukhapriya. For the song "Idhayam Poguthe" he was inspired by Symphony No. 8 by Franz Schubert. The songs were composed at President Hotel, Madras.

Track listing
No.	Title	Lyrics	Singer(s)	Length
1.	"Vaan Megangale"	Kannadasan	Malaysia Vasudevan, S. Janaki	4:34
2.	"Idhayam Poguthe"	Muthulingam	Jency	4:24
3.	"Thamthananam Thana"	Gangai Amaran	Jency, B. Vasantha	4:12
4.	"Thiruvizha Koothu"	Gangai Amaran	Ilaiyaraaja, Gangai Amaran, Bharathiraja	5:37
Total length:				18:47

== Release and reception ==
Puthiya Vaarpugal was released on 14 April 1979, during Puthandu. Ananda Vikatan rated the film 59 out of 100, saying the director presented the film without deviating from the path chosen and with intelligence and fineness. Naagai Dharuman of Anna also gave the film a very positive review. The film was a success, and won two Tamil Nadu State Film Awards: Second Best Film, and Best Dialogue Writer (Bhagyaraj).

== Bibliography ==
- Dhananjayan, G. (2011). The Best of Tamil Cinema, 1931 to 2010: 1977–2010. Galatta Media. OCLC 733724281.
- Rajadhyaksha, Ashish; Willemen, Paul (1998) [1994]. Encyclopaedia of Indian Cinema. British Film Institute and Oxford University Press. ISBN 0-19-563579-5.
- Sundararaman (2007) [2005]. Raga Chintamani: A Guide to Carnatic Ragas Through Tamil Film Music (2nd ed.). Pichhamal Chintamani. OCLC 295034757.
