= Master Haja Sheriff =

Indian actor (born 1969)

Master Khaja Sheriff
- Born: 3 January 1969 (age 57); Kilakarai, Ramanathapuram, Tamil Nadu, India
- Occupation: Actor
- Years active: 1979–2007
- Notable work: Puthiya Vaarpugal; Uthiripookkal; Suvarilladha Chiththirangal; Andha 7 Naatkal; Samsaram Adhu Minsaram

Master Khaja Sheriff (born 3 January 1969) is an Indian program organiser and former actor who primarily worked in Tamil cinema. He has made appearances in popular films such as Uthiripookkal, Suvarilladha Chiththirangal, Andha 7 Naatkal, & Samsaram Adhu Minsaram. Khaja Sheriff debuted in the 1979 film Puthiya Vaarpugal.

== Film career ==
Khaja Sheriff's debut film was in Malayalam and the first Tamil film he shot for was Neela Malargal. Although he has starred in films such as Puthiya Vaarpugal, Uthiripookkal , and Suvarilladha Chiththirangal, his most famous film of all time is Andha 7 Naatkal by K. Bhagyaraj. In this film, Haja Sheriff played the role of a dholak boy & disciple to Palakkattu Madhavan, while Bhagyaraj played Palakkattu Madhavan, an aspiring music director.

Now at present Khaja Sheriff is not acting in any film. Khaja Sheriff is currently working as Star Night Program Organizer in Countries such as Canada, Malaysia, United Arab Emirates, & United States of America.

== Filmography ==
This is a partial filmography. You can expand it.

=== Tamil films ===
Year	Film	Role	Notes
1979	Puthiya Vaarpugal	Duraisamy	Debut film
1979	Neela Malargal	Student	
1979	Uthiripookkal	Raja	
1979	Suvarilladha Chiththirangal	Arumugam	
1980	Thai Pongal		
1980	Poottaatha Poottukkal		
1980	Anbukku Naan Adimai		
1980	Moodu Pani	Pimp	Uncredited
1980	Nizhalgal		
1981	Karaiyellam Shenbagapoo		
1981	Andha 7 Naatkal	Gopi	
1981	Nenjil Oru Mul		
1982	Pokkiri Raja		
1982	Raagam Thedum Pallavi		
1982	Auto Raja	Petty shop owner	
1982	Kadhal Oviyam		
1982	Pattanathu Rajakkal		
1982	Thanikattu Raja		
1982	Ranga	Suresh	
1982	Poi Satchi		
1982	Moondru Mugam	Mani	
1982	Gopurangal Saivathillai		
1982	Valibamey Vaa Vaa		
1982	Aagaya Gangai		
1983	Thudikkum Karangal	Workshop boy	
1983	Thangaikkor Geetham		
1983	Malaiyoor Mambattiyan		
1983	Nenjamellam Neeye		
1983	Sandhippu		
1983	Raagangal Maaruvathillai		
1983	Apoorva Sahodarigal		
1983	Villiyanur Matha		
1984	Komberi Mookan		
1984	Madras Vathiyar		
1984	Pozhuthu Vidinchachu		
1984	Neram Nalla Neram		
1984	Priyamudan Prabhu		
1985	Kuzhandhai Yesu		
1985	Alai Osai		
1985	Un Kannil Neer Vazhindal		
1985	Aval Sumangalithan	Mani	
1985	Mookkanan Kayiru		
1985	Amudha Gaanam		
1985	Idaya Kovil		
1985	Aan Paavam	Cloth store employee	
1986	December Pookal		
1986	Lakshmi Vandhachu		
1986	Samsaram Adhu Minsaram	Bharathi	
1987	Kavalan Avan Kovalan	Cloth store employee	
1987	Vairagyam		
1987	Puyal Paadum Paattu		
1988	Nethiyadi	Tailor	
1989	Enne Petha Raasa	Ganesan	
1989	Enga Ooru Mappillai		
1989	Manasukketha Maharasa		
1991	Irumbu Pookkal		
1991	Nallathai Naadu Kekum	Ramu's friend	
1992	Chinna Pasanga Naanga		
1993	Aadhityan		
1993	Poranthalum Ambalaiya Porakka Koodathu		
1993	Parvathi Ennai Paradi		
1993	Porantha Veeda Puguntha Veeda	Ravi's brother	
1993	Thangakkili		
1998	Santhosham		
1998	Jolly		
2001	Seerivarum Kaalai		
2001	Citizen	Clerk	Uncredited
2006	Thalaimagan		Uncredited
2007	Kalakkura Chandru		

=== Other Language films ===
Year	Film	Role	Language	Notes
1978	Snehathinte Mukhangal	Malayalam		
1980	Mayadari Krishnudu		Telugu	
1981	Radha Kalyanam	Gopi	Telugu	
1981	Pedala Brathukulu		Telugu	
1981	Thenum Vayambum		Malayalam	
1982	Irattimadhuram		Malayalam	
1982	Golconda Abbulu		Telugu	
1987	Samsaram Oka Chadarangam		Telugu	
