= A. Veerappan =

Indian actor and screenwriter

- Born: Veerappan; 21 June 1933; Pattukkottai, Thanjavur
- Died: 30 August 2005 (age 72); Saligramam, Chennai
- Occupations: Actor, Screenwriter, Comedy writer, Director
- Years active: 1956–1988
- Notable work: Vaidehi Kathirunthal; Udaya Geetham; Idaya Kovil; Karakattakaran; Chinna Thambi
- Spouse: Porkodi
- Children: 3

A. Veerappan (21 June 1933 – 30 August 2005) was an Indian comedian, screenwriter, and film director. While having worked in more than 100 films. He is notable for his comedian roles along with fellow actor Nagesh in the 1960s.

He wrote comedy tracks for Suruli Rajan in most of the films in the 1970s. He debuted as a comedian in the film Tenali Raman (1956). He wrote comedy tracks for Goundamani and Senthil most of films in the 1980s and 1990s. His notable works such films as Vaidehi Kathirunthal, Udaya Geetham, Idaya Kovil, Karakattakaran, Chinna Thambi. The banana comedy in Karakattakkaran brought him to the peak of his fame and fetched him high accolades among movie buffs. The comedy brought Goundamani and Senthil to the peak of their fame.

== Early life ==
Veerappan was born in Avanam, Thanjavur district, Tamil Nadu. At the young age, he acted plays in Sakthi Drama troupe in Pudukkottai district. The three great actors who motivated him that day were S. V. Subbaiah, Nambiar, S.A. Natarajan. Actor S. A Kannan. then, Sivaji Ganesan has joined in Sakthi Drama Troupe and acted along with Veerappan. They were close friends in drama days. In 1950, when Sivaji Ganesan was playing the hero in the drama "En Thangai", he got a chance to play Parasakthi film. Since he acted in cinema, Veerappan was given the role and for more than 25 weeks, the play took place in many parts of Tamil Nadu. Panathottam was the first film which Veerappan wrote comedy track however Madras to Pondicherry became a turning point in his career.

== Film career ==
Veerappan had written the comedy sequences for several films including Karakattakaran, Vaidehi Kathirunthal, Idhaya Kovil, Udhaya Geetham etc which featured Goundamani and Senthil. and directed only one movie Deiveega raagangal (1980). His comedy sequences in Karakattakaran fetched him high accolades among movie buffs.

== Family ==
He has a wife, Porkodi, two daughters Shanti and Uma, and one son Anand.

== Death ==
Veerappan suffered cardiac arrest and died at his residence in Saligramam on 30 August 2005.

== Filmography ==
This is a partial filmography. You can expand it.

=== As actor ===
Year	Film	Role	Notes
1956	Tenali Raman		
1959	Naalu Veli Nilam		
1962	Saradha		
1962	Padithal Mattum Podhuma		
1963	Panathottam	Ramu's friend	
1964	Thaayin Madiyil		
1964	Amma Enge		
1964	Aayiram Roobai		
1965	Kalangarai Vilakkam	Deva, a tourist guide	
1965	Hello Mister Zamindar		
1965	Thazhampoo	car driver	
1965	Panchavarna Kili	Nagappan	
1966	Yaar Nee?	Ananth Home sarvent	
1966	Nadodi		
1966	Madras to Pondicherry	a Brahmin man	
1967	Soappu Seeppu Kannadi		
1967	Kan Kanda Deivam		
1968	Oli Vilakku		
1968	Poovum Pottum		
1968	Jeevanaamsam		
1968	Kudiyirundha Koyil		
1969	Ponnu Mappillai		
1969	Kuzhandai Ullam		
1970	Namma Veetu Deivam		
1971	Deivam Pesuma		
1971	Iru Thuruvam		
1971	Savaale Samali	Nattamai	
1971	Thulli Odum Pulliman		
1972	Annai Abirami		
1972	Thiruneelakandar	Singaram	
1972	Avasara Kalyanam		
1973	Deivamsam		
1973	Sollathaan Ninaikkiren		
1973	Pattikaattu Ponnaiya		
1973	Ponnunjal	Sappani	
1975	Ellorum Nallavare		
1977	Nallathukku Kalamillai		
1981	Aani Ver		
1981	Chinna Mul Peria Mul	Krishnamoorthy	
1982	Pattanathu Rajakkal		
1984	Andha June 16aam Naal		
1985	Udaya Geetham		
1988	Shenbagamae Shenbagamae		
2002	Kadhal Azhivathillai		

=== As Comedy Writer ===
Year	Film	Comedy Stars
1982	Payanangal Mudivathillai	Goundamani
1984	Vaidehi Kathirunthal	Goundamani, Senthil
1985	Udaya Geetham	Goundamani, Senthil
1985	Idaya Kovil	Goundamani, Senthil
1989	Karakattakkaran	Goundamani, Senthil
1991	Chinna Thambi	Goundamani

=== As director ===
Year	Film	Cast
1980	Deiveega Raagangal	Srikanth, Roja Ramani, Vadivukkarasi.

=== As story writer ===
- Rojavin Raja (1976)
- Rudra Thandavam (1978)
- Raja Enga Raja (1995)
