= Sigappu Nirathil Chinnappoo =

- Directed by: R. Selvaraj
- Written by: R. Selvaraj
- Produced by: D. Ramanaidu
- Starring: Rattankumar; Rekha
- Cinematography: Raja Rajan
- Edited by: B. K. Mohan; Rajagopal
- Music by: Jaisekar
- Production company: Rajeshwari Films
- Release date: 22 June 1990
- Country: India
- Language: Tamil
- Budget: ₹7 lakh

Sigappu Nirathil Chinnappoo (transl. The small red rose) is a 1990 Indian Tamil-language film written and directed by R. Selvaraj, and produced by D. Ramanaidu. The film stars Rattankumar and Rekha. It was released on 22 June 1990.

== Plot ==
Annachi is a social worker who fights anti-social people, including those of high status. This leads to a mortal attack on him by a criminal named Mahadevan and for six months, Annachi's wife Kasturi tends to her husband who is comatose. Just when Annachi is regaining consciousness, Mahadevan returns to kill him and frames Annachi's wife, leading to her arrest. Annachi's son becomes determined to clear his mother's name. He eventually kills Mahadevan and is sent to a juvenile detention center, while Kasturi is exonerated.

== Cast ==
- Rattankumar as Annachi
- Rekha as Kasturi
- Victor Ponnudurai as Mahadevan
- Master Sathish as Annachi's son
- Baby Sajini as Annachi's daughter

== Production ==
Sigappu Nirathil Chinnappoo was produced by D. Ramanaidu under Rajeshwari Films on a budget of ₹7 lakh, and directed by R. Selvaraj who also wrote the script. Vinod Raj portrayed the antagonist Mahadevan, using the screen name Victor Ponnudurai.

== Soundtrack ==
The soundtrack was composed by Jaisekar.

== Release and reception ==
Sigappu Nirathil Chinnappoo was released on 22 June 1990. N. Krishnaswamy of The Indian Express wrote, "Sigappu Nirathil Chinnappoo avoids the beaten track of the masala film."
