= Bhagavathipuram Railway Gate =

- Title card
- Directed by: R. Selvaraj
- Written by: R. Selvaraj
- Produced by: M. Balasubramanian
- Starring: Karthik; Rajyalakshmi
- Cinematography: Dinesh Baboo
- Edited by: R. Bhaskran
- Music by: Ilaiyaraaja
- Production company: Karur B. S. Films
- Release date: 14 April 1983
- Country: India
- Language: Tamil

Bhagavathipuram Railway Gate is a 1983 Indian Tamil-language film written and directed by R. Selvaraj. The film stars Karthik and Rajyalakshmi. It was released on 14 April 1983.

== Cast ==
- Karthik
- Rajyalakshmi
- Thiagarajan
- Vadivukkarasi
- Silk Smitha
- Kamala Kamesh
- Senthil

== Production ==
The song "Sevvarali Thottathula" was filmed at Vaigai Dam, Theni.

== Soundtrack ==
The music was composed by Ilaiyaraaja.

Track listing
| No. | Title | Lyrics | Singer(s) | Length |
|---|---|---|---|---|
| 1. | "Kaalai Nera Kaatre" | M. G. Vallabhan | S. P. Sailaja, Deepan Chakravarthy | 4:26 |
| 2. | "Samba Pudhu" | Gangai Amaran | S. P. Sailaja | 4:55 |
| 3. | "Sevvarali Thottathula" | Gangai Amaran | Uma Ramanan, Ilaiyaraaja | 4:28 |
| 4. | "Thendral Kaatrum" | Muthulingam | B. S. Sasirekha | 4:26 |
| Total length: | | | | 18:15 |

== Reception ==
Jayamanmadhan of Kalki gave the film a mixed review, but appreciated the music.
