= Deiveega Raagangal =

- Theatrical release poster
- Directed by: A. Veerappan
- Written by: A. Veerappan
- Starring: Srikanth; Vadivukkarasi; Leela; Priyavadhana
- Music by: M. S. Viswanathan
- Production company: Aachi Cine Arts
- Release date: 29 February 1980
- Country: India
- Language: Tamil

Deiveega Raagangal (transl. Divine Melodies) is a 1980 Indian Tamil-language comedy horror film written and directed by A. Veerappan. The film stars Srikanth, Vadivukkarasi, Leela and Priyavadhana. It was released on 29 February 1980.

== Plot ==
Prabhu, a wealthy womaniser, cheats three women. The trio commit suicide and live on as spirits. They seek to avenge their deaths by tormenting Prabhu.

== Cast ==
- Srikanth as Prabhu
- Vadivukkarasi
- Leela
- Priyavadhana
- Suruli Rajan

== Soundtrack ==
The soundtrack was composed by M. S. Viswanathan.

Track listing
No.	Title	Lyrics	Singer(s)	Length
1.	"Paavai Nee Malaigai Paal Nila"	Pulamaipithan	P. Jayachandran, Vani Jairam	4:28
2.	"Ganga Yamuna Sarsawathi"	Kannadasan	Vani Jairam	5:11
3.	"Pachchai Mohini"	Kannadasan	Vani Jairam	4:01
4.	"Oduvathu Azhaguratham"	Kannadasan	Jolly Abraham, S. Janaki

== Critical reception ==
Kanthan of Kalki wrote if thought rationally the concept of spirits taking revenge is an unbelievable imagination however the writer deserves praise for killing the villain by using the movement of spirits. Naagai Dharuman of Anna praised the acting, music, cinematography and direction.
