= Naan Paadum Paadal =

1984 film by R. Sundarrajan

- Theatrical release poster
- Directed by: R. Sundarrajan
- Written by: R. Sundarrajan
- Produced by: Rajesh Khanna; A. Francis Xavier; R. Palaniswamy
- Starring: Sivakumar; Mohan; Ambika; Pandiyan
- Cinematography: Rajarajan
- Edited by: R. Baskaran; B. Krishnakumar
- Music by: Ilaiyaraaja
- Production company: Motherland Pictures
- Release date: 14 April 1984
- Country: India
- Language: Tamil

Naan Paadum Paadal (transl. The song I sing) is a 1984 Indian Tamil-language film written and directed by R. Sundarrajan. The film stars Sivakumar, Mohan, Ambika and Pandiyan. It was released on 14 April 1984. The film was remade in Telugu as Mangalya Bandham (1985).

== Plot ==
Gowri, a widowed school teacher, lives with her late husband's loving family, finding comfort in their support, her teaching career, and reading novels by her favourite author, CRS. Subramani, a novelist who writes under the pseudonym CRS, moves into the same housing complex to stay with his nephew, Selvam, while working on his latest book. Initially unaware of his true identity, Gowri is suspicious of Subramani due to a series of misunderstandings, while he becomes intrigued by her reserved yet compassionate nature.

Subramani learns about Gowri's tragic past: once a talented singer, she fell in love with Anand, a doctor, and married him with their families' blessings. However, Anand tragically died in an accident just three days after their wedding, leaving Gowri heartbroken. In her grief, she gave up singing and dedicated herself to teaching and supporting Anand's family.

As Gowri discovers Subramani's identity as CRS, she begins to warm up to him, appreciating his kindness and perspective. Their friendship deepens, and she grows protective of him, leading her family to consider the possibility of her remarrying. Subramani also develops feelings for Gowri but remains uncertain about her readiness to move forward. The story culminates with Gowri facing a pivotal decision: whether to embrace a new chapter in her life or remain steadfast in her devotion to her past.

== Cast ==
- Sivakumar as C. R. Subramaniam
- Mohan as Dr. Anand
- Ambika as Shyamala Gowri
- Pandiyan as Selvam
- Ilavarasi as Sivagami
- Sarath Babu as Barath (special appearance)
- Suresh as bus conductor (special appearance)
- Shankar–Ganesh in a Special appearance
- Nalini as Lakshmi (special appearance)
- Poornam Viswanathan as Rangarajan
- V. Gopalakrishnan as Anand's father
- Kamala Kamesh as Maragatham
- Goundamani as Surya Kumar
- Senthil as laundryman

== Production ==
The idea of Naan Paadum Paadal came to R. Sundarrajan came from a true incident. The film was launched at AVM Studios along with song recording. Sivakumar worked as Ambika's makeup artist during the filming of the climax. According to Kovaithambi, two climaxes had been decided for the film which led to confusion over which to choose; it was Ilaiyaraaja who chose the climax which was featured in the film. Majority of the film was shot at Kanyakumari especially at locations such as Tirparappu Waterfalls, Vivekananda Rock Memorial and Pechipari Dam. The climax was shot at Muttom, Kanyakumari. The scene of Mohan meeting with an accident and Ambika performing a song was shot at Sathya Studios and at a bungalow at College Road, Nungambakkam, Chennai.

== Soundtrack ==
The music was composed by Ilaiyaraaja. The song "Paadava Un Paadalai" uses the conga, a percussion commonly used in Afro-Cuban genres. The song "Paadum Vanambadi" is set in the raga known as Patdeep, while "Devan Kovil" is set in Yamunakalyani.

Song	Singers	Lyrics	Length
"Paadavaa Un Paadalai"	S. Janaki	Vairamuthu	04:21
"Devan Kovil"	S. N. Surendar, S. Janaki	Muthulingam	04:22
"Machane Vatchikodi"	Gangai Amaran, S. P. Sailaja	Vaali	5:08
"Paadum Vanambadi"	S. P. Balasubrahmanyam	Na. Kamarasan	4:06
"Seer Kondu Vaa"	S. P. Balasubrahmanyam, S. Janaki	Gangai Amaran	5:24
"Devan Kovil (Solo)"	S. Janaki	Muthulingam	04:09
"Paadava Un Paadalai (Pathos)"	S. Janaki	Vairamuthu	04:31

== Critical reception ==
Jayamanmadhan of Kalki wrote Sundarrajan can be praised for many things, for the way the poignant story has been told elegantly, for creating characters that stand out in the mind and not rushing till the intermission to insert songs.

== Bibliography ==
- Sundararaman (2007) [2005]. Raga Chintamani: A Guide to Carnatic Ragas Through Tamil Film Music (2nd ed.). Chennai: Pichhamal Chintamani. OCLC 295034757.
