= Uyire Unakkaga =

- Theatrical release poster
- Directed by: K. Rangaraj
- Written by: M. G. Vallabhan (dialogues)
- Screenplay by: K. Rangaraj
- Story by: Motherland Pictures Story Unit
- Produced by: Kovaithambi
- Starring: Mohan; Nadhiya; Chinni Jayanth; Vijayakumar
- Cinematography: Dinesh Baboo
- Edited by: R. Bhaskaran; B. Krishnakumar
- Music by: Laxmikant–Pyarelal
- Production company: Motherland Pictures
- Release date: 7 March 1986
- Country: India
- Language: Tamil

Uyire Unakkaga (transl. My life is for you) is a 1986 Indian Tamil language romance film, directed by K. Rangaraj. The film stars Mohan, Nadhiya, Chinni Jayanth and Vijayakumar. It was released on 7 March 1986.

== Plot ==
Vijayanirmala Devi, a princess and heiress, has escaped her wealthy but selfish father, king Vijayaragunath Boobapathy. Calling herself Uma, she meets a young man named Balumurali "Balu" and claims to be his distant cousin. She is welcomed warmly by Balu's family, including his mother Abhirami, his older brother Murugesan, and his sisters Kanchana and Sulochana. Balu and Vijayanirmala begin to fall in love, to the delight of the family.

Meanwhile, Vijayaragunath has ordered a group of motorcyclists to find his daughter at any cost. The group grows closer to finding Vijayanirmala as she and Balu prepare for their approaching marriage.

Upon the arrival of Vijayanirmala's father, her true identity is revealed. Balu and his family distance themselves from Vijayanirmala, feeling betrayed by her deceit. Vijayanirmala grows ill with heartbreak and is close to death when Balu comes to her aid. Balu tells Vijayanirmala that he will always love her, and she is cured.

Abhirami, who has been ill since the death of her husband, is now in critical condition and requires an expensive life-saving operation, which her family can't afford. The family see an advertisement in the newspaper offering a reward for information about the missing princess. Sulochana suggests they turn in Vijayanirmala in exchange for money for Abhirami's operation, but Balu refuses to betray Vijayanirmala.

Vijayanirmala secretly decides to surrender herself to her father in exchange for the money to fund Abhirami's operation. She says goodbye to an unsuspecting Balu and us picked up by her father in a hospital. Vijayaragunath pays for Abhirami's operation, which is successful. Upon arriving at the hospital, Balu, discovering what Vijayanirmala has done, tries to follow her. He is caught by Vijayaragunath's men and is beaten. Severely injured, Balu rises and runs after the helicopter. Moved by this display of love, Vijayaragunath lands the helicopter and Vijayanirmala and Balu are reunited.

== Cast ==
- Mohan as Balu alias Balumurali
- Nadhiya as Uma alias princess Vijayanirmala Devi
- Sujatha as Abhirami, Balu's mother
- Chinni Jayanth as Balu's friend
- Sangeeta as Asha Devi
- Vijayakumar as King Vijayaragunath Boobapathy of Jayanagar Raja
- Charle as Murugesan Mudeliyar's assistant
- Meesai Murugesan as Murugesan Mudeliyar, Abhirami's elder brother
- Senthil as Manmadhan , the shoemaker
- Kovai Sarala as Rathi , The shoemaker's girlfriend
- Tinku as Ramu alias Ramuvilass
- A.R.S.
- V. Gopalakrishnan as Kadheresan
- Thyagu as Balu's friend
- Baby Meena as princess Vijayanirmala Devi at 10 years

== Production ==
Some scenes were shot at Lalitha Mahal, Mysore. The song "I want to be a Big Man" was shot at a set in Prasad Studios and was also shot at Vivekananda Rock Memorial at Kanyakumari, Mangaluru, Kudremukha, and Mahabalipuram.

== Soundtrack ==
The music was composed by Laxmikant–Pyarelal.

Song	Singers	Lyrics	Length
"Panneeril Nanaintha"	S. Janaki and chorus	Vaali	06:52
"Thenurum Ragam" – 1	S. Janaki	Vairamuthu	05:33
"Ododi Vilaiyadu"	S. P. Balasubrahmanyam, S. Janaki, Dinesh Babu, S. V. Ponnusamy and Padma	M. G. Vallabhan	05:14
"Thenurum Ragam" – 2	S. Janaki	Vairamuthu	01:12
"Pallavi Illamal" – 1	S. P. Balasubrahmanyam	Vairamuthu	02:54
"I Want To Be A Big Man"	S. P. Balasubrahmanyam and S. Janaki	Vaali	06:53
"Kavithaigal Veeriyum"	S. P. Balasubrahmanyam, S. Janaki and chorus	M. G. Vallabhan	05:53
"Kaiyale Unnai"	S. P. Balasubrahmanyam and S. Janaki	Muthulingam	04:36
"Pallavi Illamal" – 2	S. P. Balasubrahmanyam and S. Janaki	Vairamuthu	02:18

== Reception ==
Kalki appreciated the performances of Mohan and Sujatha, adding that Nadhiya got a great chance to exhibit her acting prowess through this film, but that the film itself was unnecessarily stretched. Balumani of Anna praised the star cast but felt Vijayakumar was not convincing as zamindar while praising Laxmikant–Pyarelal's music noting despite good music was unable to enjoy their music the same way as Ilaiyaraaja and concluded calling it a film which can be watched with family.
