= Unnai Naan Santhithen =

1984 film by K. Rangaraj

- Theatrical release poster
- Directed by: K. Rangaraj
- Written by: Aaroor Dass (dialogues)
- Screenplay by: K. Rangaraj
- Story by: K. Rangaraj
- Produced by: Kovaithambi
- Starring: Sivakumar; Sujatha; Suresh; Revathi
- Cinematography: Dinesh Baboo
- Edited by: R. Bhaskaran; B. Krishnakumar
- Music by: Ilaiyaraaja
- Production company: Motherland Pictures
- Release date: 23 October 1984
- Country: India
- Language: Tamil

Unnai Naan Santhithen (transl. I met you) is a 1984 Indian Tamil-language film written and directed by K. Rangaraj, and produced by Kovaithambi. The film stars Sivakumar, Sujatha, Suresh and Revathi. It was released on 23 October 1984 and became a success. The film was remade in Hindi as Sindoor (1987) and in Telugu as Sumangali (1989).

== Plot ==
College student Indhumathi is the playful only child of Janaki. Indhu falls in love with fellow college student Murali. Murali's father, Sabapathy, and Janaki agree to their marriage but under the condition that both must graduate first. Indhu is worried about her Tamil exams as that's her weak subject. Sabapathy arranges for Indhu's professor, Raghuraman, to tutor her. Raghuraman is shocked to see that Janaki is Indhu's mother and even more shocked when Indu mentions her deceased father as Captain Jagdeesh.

In the past, Janaki and Raghuraman were married. Janaki sang at stage shows with her friend Vijay and Raghuraman suspected the two of having an affair. Unable to stand her husband's suspicions, Janaki left him and found sanctuary with Captain Jagdeesh who was a widower with a young daughter, Indhu. When the captain died, Janaki raised Indhu and allowed her to believe that Janaki was her biological mother.

In the years of separation with Janaki, Raghuraman realised the error of his ways and is sympathetic to her current situation. He agrees to keep their marriage a secret and the two grow closer again. Murali sees the two in an intimate situation and informs Indhu of this. Janaki is now forced to deal with her daughter's displeasure and the fall out that her relationship with Raghuraman has on her relationship with Indhu.

== Cast ==
- Sivakumar as Raghuraman
- Sujatha as Janaki
- Suresh as Murali
- Revathi as Indhumathi
- Mohan as Vijay (guest appearance)
- Sarath Babu as Captain Jagdeesh (guest appearance)
- V. K. Ramasamy as Sabapathy
- Poornam Viswanathan as Doctor
- Goundamani as Pandiya
- Y. Vijaya as Ammani
- Baby Rekha as young Indhumathi

== Production ==
Unnai Naan Santhithen was produced by Kovaithambi under Motherland Pictures, and was the fourth directorial venture of K. Rangaraj, who also wrote the screenplay. Editing was handled by R. Bhaskaran and B. Krishnakumar, and cinematography by Dinesh Baboo, while Aaroor Dass wrote the dialogues. For one song sequence, Revathi had to sport a dress made from feather. The comedy track was written by A. Veerappan and it was the first film he had written for Goundamani and Senthil. The filming was held at Kodaikanal.

== Soundtrack ==
The soundtrack was composed by Ilaiyaraaja. The song "Unnai Kaanum Neram", written by M. G. Vallabhan, attained popularity. Although not the last song written to be written by Kannadasan before his death, "Devan Thantha Veenai" was the last to be released. It is set in Kalyani raga, and "Hey I Love You" is set in Natabhairavi. "Devan Thantha Veenai" was adapted from "Nanna Jeeva Neenu" from the 1981 Kannada film Geetha.

Track listing
No.	Title	Lyrics	Singer(s)	Length
1.	"Devan Thantha Veenai"	Kannadasan	S. P. Balasubrahmanyam, S. Janaki
2.	"Unnai Kaanum Neram"	M. G. Vallabhan	K. J. Yesudas, Vani Jairam
3.	"Thaalaatu Maari" (female)	Vairamuthu	S. Janaki
4.	"Thaalaatu Maari" (male)	Vairamuthu	Ilaiyaraaja
5.	"Devan Thantha Veenai" (duet)	Kannadasan	S. Janaki, P. Jayachandran
6.	"Hey I Love You"	Muthulingam	K. J. Yesudas, Vani Jairam

== Release and reception ==
Unnai Naan Santhithen was released on 23 October 1984 on Diwali. Jayamanmadhan of Kalki praised the performances of actors, Ilaiyaraaja's music, Dinesh Babu's cinematography and flashbacks but panned the climax. Balumani of Anna praised acting, humour, cinematography, music and direction. The film became a success, running for 150 days in theatres, besides earning a good name for Rangaraj in the Tamil film industry.

== Bibliography ==
- Sundararaman (2007) [2005]. Raga Chintamani: A Guide to Carnatic Ragas Through Tamil Film Music (2nd ed.). Pichhamal Chintamani. OCLC 295034757.
