= Pattanathu Rajakkal =

1982 film by S. A. Chandrasekhar

- Title card
- Directed by: S. A. Chandrasekhar
- Screenplay by: S. A. Chandrasekhar
- Story by: Shoba
- Produced by: P. S. V. Hariharan
- Starring: Vijayakanth; Silk Smitha
- Cinematography: D. D. Prasad
- Edited by: P. R. Gowthamraj
- Music by: Shankar–Ganesh
- Production company: PSV Cine Arts
- Release date: 5 March 1982
- Running time: 110 minutes
- Country: India
- Language: Tamil

Pattanathu Rajakkal (transl. Kings of the City) (Note: Spelt on the CBFC certificate as Pattanathu Raajaakkal.) is a 1982 Indian Tamil-language action drama film directed by S. A. Chandrasekhar, starring Vijayakanth and Silk Smitha. It was released on 5 March 1982.

== Cast ==
- Vijayakanth as Vijay
- Silk Smitha as Rekha
- Jaishankar
- Gowri (debut)
- Typist Gopu
- Thideer Kannaiah
- Jocker Thulasi
- Master Kajah Sherieef
- A. Veerappan
- K. Kannan
- S. S. Chandran
- Jaggu
- Amjath Kumar
- Baby Shanthi
- Baby Shakeela

== Soundtrack ==
The music was composed by Shankar–Ganesh.

Track listing
No.	Title	Lyrics	Singer(s)	Length
1.	"Kaathal Enum"	Pulamaipithan	Malaysia Vasudevan	5:10
2.	"Yeazhaiyin"	Vaali	Malaysia Vasudevan	2:58

== Reception ==
Kalki praised the acting of Vijayakanth, Smitha, Jaishankar and concluded its a masala massage given by Chandrasekhar to the fans.
