= Mannukkul Vairam =

- Theatrical release poster
- Directed by: Manoj Kumar
- Written by: Manoj Kumar
- Produced by: Kovaithambi
- Starring: Sivaji Ganesan; Sujatha; Rajesh; Murali
- Cinematography: K. S. Selvaraj
- Edited by: R. Baskaran
- Music by: Devendran
- Production company: Motherland Pictures
- Release date: 12 December 1986
- Running time: 138 minutes
- Country: India
- Language: Tamil

Mannukkul Vairam (transl. Diamond in the soil) is a 1986 Indian Tamil-language film directed by Manoj Kumar in his debut and produced by Kovaithambi. The film stars Sivaji Ganesan, Sujatha, Rajesh, and Murali. It was released on 12 December 1986.

== Plot ==
Chittu returns to her hometown of Mettupatti after being raised by her grandmother in a neighbouring town. The two most powerful and wealthy men in town are brothers Thavasi, known as Periyavar, and Virumandi, known as Chinnavar. Periyavar believes in equal justice above all else and is highly respected in the village while Chinnavar believes is his own caste superiority. Periyavar has a very young grandchild, Chinnathayee, who has been widowed after a child marriage.

Chittu's parents, Velappa and Velaiamma, work as laundresses in the town. Chittu finds it difficult to adjust to the town's rigid caste hierarchy after being raised with more freedom by her grandmother. She also clashes with her classmate Mayilsamy, Chinnavar's son, who constantly teases and humiliates her due to her caste.

Chittu eventually convenes the panchayat to ask for justice, and Periyavar punishes Mayilsamy. However, Chittu intervenes, worried that his punishment will only breed more resentment and retaliation. In the aftermath, Mayilsamy realises his errors and soon falls in love with Chittu, while Periyavar grows closer to Velappa's family.

Chinnavar is incensed by Chittu's perceived arrogance and what he believes is Velappa rising above his station. When Periyavar is called away, Chinnavar, the town's doctor and a few others force Velappa to work during the town's Pongal festival celebrations. Velappa is terribly burned in an accident while working. Chittu begs the doctor for help, but is rebuffed by him and Chinnavar. Velappa dies in agony, and in her grief and anger, Chittu confronts Chinnavar and his friends for their cruelty.

In retaliation, Chinnavar drives Chittu and Vellamma out of town. Years later, the two women return when Chittu becomes the town's new doctor. Some of the townspeople have changed significantly, while many others remain the same. Chittu must now face Chinnavar's continued hatred and the consequences of his actions on the people she cares about.

== Cast ==
- Sivaji Ganesan as Thavasi aka Periyavar
- Sujatha as Velaiamma
- Rajesh as Velappa
- Murali as Mayilsamy
- Ranjini as Chittu
- Vinu Chakravarthy as Virumandi aka Chinnavar
- Goundamani as Esakki
- Senthil as Sembattai
- Gandhimathi as Mayilsamy's mother
- Kovai Sarala
- Pandiyan as Bhoomi
- Vani Viswanath as Chinnathayee (adult)
- Vinodhini as Chinnathayee (young)
- Baby Lakshmi
- Keerthi
- Devi
- Madurai Saroja
- Vijaya
- Nagalakshmi
- K. K. Soundar
- Ramnath
- Suryakanth
- Krishnamoorthy
- Jayapal
- Kullamani
- Pasi Narayanan
- Vellai Subbaiah
- Periya Karuppu Thevar
- M. L. A. Murugesh
- Karisai Amalan
- Rajamani
- Singamuthu

== Production ==
Manoj Kumar, the brother-in-law and co-director to director Bharathiraja, made his directorial debut with this film. Producer Kovaithambi was impressed with the story narrated by Manoj and immediately shared the story with Sivaji Ganesan, who agreed to act in the film. The film was launched on 9 July 1986 at Prasad Studios.

== Soundtrack ==
The soundtrack was composed by Devendran in his debut. The song "Pongiyathe Kadhal" was based on a composition he had created while working as a music teacher at a school.

Track listing
No.	Title	Lyrics	Singer(s)	Length
1.	"Ithalodu Ithal"	Vairamuthu	S. P. Balasubrahmanyam, S. Janaki
2.	"Pongiyathe"	Vairamuthu	S. P. Balasubrahmanyam, S. Janaki
3.	"Achuvella"	Vairamuthu	S. P. Balasubrahmanyam
4.	"Muthu Sirithathu"	Muthulingam	S. P. Balasubrahmanyam, S. Janaki
5.	"Kizhakku Veluthachu"	Vairamuthu	Malaysia Vasudevan
6.	"Jaathimalligaiye"	Pulamaipithan	Malaysia Vasudevan
7.	"Vaasalukku Kaapu"	Vairamuthu	Sasirekha
8.	"Aatha Maariyatha"	Vairamuthu	S. Janaki
9.	"Achu Vella Pechukaari"	Vairamuthu	Malaysia Vasudevan
10.	"Chandran Parandhurukku"	Vairamuthu	Malaysia Vasudevan, Sasirekha

== Reception ==
Mannukkul Vairam was released on 12 December 1986. The Indian Express praised Manoj Kumar's "treatment of caste discrimination is [..] subdued". Jayamanmadhan of Kalki wrote after coming out it gave a feeling of watching an old Bharathiraja film albeit satisfied. Balumani of Anna praised the acting, humour, music, cinematography, direction and appreciated Motherland Pictures for making a film conveying social message. Kovaithambi said the film ran for 50 days in theatres, and though it was not that successful, it gave him the satisfaction of working with Sivaji Ganesan.
