= Idaya Kovil =

1985 film by Mani Ratnam

- Poster
- Directed by: Mani Ratnam
- Screenplay by: M. G. Vallabhan
- Story by: R. Selvaraj
- Produced by: Kovaithambi
- Starring: Mohan; Radha; Ambika
- Cinematography: Raja Rajan
- Edited by: B. Lenin; V. T. Vijayan
- Music by: Ilaiyaraaja
- Production company: Motherland Pictures
- Release date: 14 September 1985
- Running time: 160 minutes
- Country: India
- Language: Tamil

Idaya Kovil (transl. Temple of the Heart) is a 1985 Indian Tamil-language film directed by Mani Ratnam, starring Mohan, Ambika, Radha and Goundamani. The score and soundtrack were composed by Ilaiyaraaja which went on to become hits. The film, released on 14 September 1985, did well at the box office.

== Plot ==
Suriya, a college girl, wishes to get popular singer Shankar to sing in her college festival. Initial attempts to meet Shankar prove futile as he is a recluse. Nonetheless, she breaks into his home to meet him but is shocked to discover him in an inebriated state. She makes efforts to make him sober and come to the festival. It works as Shankar performs at the festival. Over time, as they become friends, Shankar stops drinking and Suriya falls in love with him, but he has a dark past which is then revealed.

Before becoming famous, Shankar grew up in a village where he used to sing in the festivals. He loved a woman named Gauri and, with encouragement from her, wishes to become a famous singer and leaves for Madras. He soon gets an opportunity to sing for a radio program but unknown to him, Gauri arrived at Madras on the same day. Without Shankar to receive her at the bus stop, she gets lost in the city when trying to find Shankar and is chased by a group of thugs and finds refuge in a temple, where she commits suicide. At the same time Shankar sings for the program and later finds her body in the temple. This incident drives Shankar into an alcoholic recluse.

Meanwhile, Suriya's parents arrange for her to be married to her friend. Although Suriya wants to marry Shankar, he refuses stating that his only true love is Gauri even though he cares about her. On the day of the wedding, just before the ceremony, Suriya collapses and dies, having consumed poison prior to the marriage.

The film ends as Shankar looks over the graves of both Gauri and Suriya.

== Cast ==
- Mohan as Shankar
- Radha as Suriya
- Ambika as Gowri
- Goundamani as Logidhasan Bhagavathar
- Kapil Dev as Suresh
- Chinni Jayanth as Suresh's friend
- Charle as Charle
- Senthil as Logidhasan Bhagavathar's assistant
- G. Srinivasan as Reddiar (Gowri's father)
- Thyagu as Suresh's friend
- Ilavarasu as Shankar's friend
- Oru Viral Krishna Rao as Kanagasabai
- Meesai Murugesan as Petti Shopper
- Omakuchi Narasimhan as Violinist
- Typist Gopu as Kadam Player
- Pasi Narayanan as Ponnabalam
- Kaaja Sheriff
- Madhan Bob as Music conductor (uncredited)

== Production ==
Producer Kovaithambi of Motherland Pictures had the dates of Radha and Ambika, as well as a story ready for a potential film. He sent over the narration of his story in an audio cassette to Mani Ratnam, who he wanted to direct the script. Ratnam was then busy finishing work on Pagal Nilavu (1985) and initially turned down the opportunity to direct the film. Kovaithambi subsequently called up the managers of Radha and Ambika and postponed their schedules, and stated that he would wait for Ratnam to finish work on Pagal Nilavu and was adamant that Ratnam should direct his script.

After finishing his other film, Ratnam returned and narrated a script titled Divya, which later went on to become Mouna Ragam (1986), to Kovaithambi, but he refused and insisted that Ratnam worked on his original script with Radha and Ambika. Ratnam initially wrote a screenplay for the film, inspired from the American film Limelight (1952), with the plot being narrated from the perspective of a star. Kovaithambi was unimpressed with the idea and demanded that Ratnam concentrate only on the technical work of the film. The producer also insisted on inserting a comedy track written by Veerapan featuring Goundamani into the film. Ratnam wanted P. C. Sreeram to be the cinematographer, but that position instead went to Raja Rajan. While shooting a scene where Radha rides a horse, the horse galloped and Radha got hurt after falling down.

Despite the film's commercial success, Ratnam told film critic Baradwaj Rangan that the filming process had made him "miserable", and that he understood that the reason he came into cinema was not to make films like Idaya Kovil, and was adamant to not make any more commercial compromises to his films. Irked by Ratnam's remarks on Idaya Kovil, Kovaithambi expressed regret for providing Ratnam an opportunity. He said Ratnam spent the amount equivalent to making three films while making Idaya Kovil.

== Soundtrack ==
The music was composed by Ilaiyaraaja. Ratnam said the song "Naan Paadum Mouna Raagam" was his homage to the 1957 Hindi film Pyaasa and the inspiration for the title of Mouna Ragam came from the song. The song was written by Vairamuthu, in his first collaboration with Ratnam. "Idhayam Oru Kovil" is Ilaiyaraaja's debut as a lyricist. He dedicated the song to his wife Jeeva, and it was written in such a way that her name would be repeated throughout the song.

Track listing
No.	Title	Lyrics	Singer(s)	Length
1.	"Idhayam Oru Kovil" (solo)	Ilaiyaraaja	Ilaiyaraaja
2.	"Yaar Veettil"	Mu. Metha	S. P. Balasubrahmanyam	4:41
3.	"Kootathilae"	Muthulingam	S. P. Balasubrahmanyam	4:29
4.	"Paattu Thalaivan"	Na. Kamarasan	S. P. Balasubrahmanyam, S. Janaki	4:43
5.	"Naan Paadum Mouna Raagam"	Vairamuthu	S. P. Balasubrahmanyam	4:23
6.	"Vaanuyarntha"	Pavalar Varadharasan	S. P. Balasubrahmanyam	5:14
7.	"Idhayam Oru Kovil" (duet)	Ilaiyaraaja	S. P. Balasubrahmanyam, S. Janaki
8.	"Oororama"	Vaalee	Ilaiyaraaja, K. S. Chithra	4:51
Total length:				28:21

== Critical reception ==
The magazine Kalki's critic appreciated the film for the cinematography and music. Balumani of Anna praised the acting, cinematography, music and direction.

== Bibliography ==
- Rangan, Baradwaj (2012). Conversations with Mani Ratnam. Penguin Books India. ISBN 978-0-670-08520-0.
