= Rudra Thandavam (1978 film) =

- Theatrical release poster
- Directed by: K. Vijayan
- Story by: A. Veerappan
- Produced by: R. Ramani
- Starring: Vijayakumar; V. K. Ramasamy; Nagesh; Sumithra
- Cinematography: G. Or. Nathan
- Edited by: B. Kandasamy
- Music by: M. S. Viswanathan
- Production company: Alamelu Manga Productions
- Release date: 29 September 1978
- Country: India
- Language: Tamil

Rudra Thandavam (transl. Violent dance) is a 1978 Indian Tamil-language devotional comedy film directed by K. Vijayan and written by A. Veerappan. It is based on Veerappan's 1976 play of the same name. The film stars Vijayakumar, V. K. Ramasamy, Nagesh and Sumithra. It revolves around Shiva taking a priest around the world to provide him with knowledge. The film was released on 29 September 1978, and became a success.

== Plot ==
Ponnambalam, a poor priest, has a dream where Shiva takes him around the world to provide him with knowledge.

== Cast ==
- Vijayakumar as Ravi
- V. K. Ramasamy as Shiva
- Nagesh as Ponnambalam
- Thengai Srinivasan as Kanagasabai
- M. R. R. Vasu as Marappan
- Suruli Rajan as Varadha
- Radha Ravi as Gopal
- Sumithra as Ponnambalam's daughter
- Manorama

== Production ==
Filming took place at Vauhini Studios in Madras (now Chennai), and was completed in a single schedule.

== Critical reception ==
Naagai Dharuman of Anna praised the performances, humour and music but felt the film did not give the same feel the play gave and the commercial inclusions diminished the importance of Shiva.
