= Neela Malargal =

1979 film by Krishnan–Panju

- Theatrical release poster
- Directed by: Krishnan–Panju
- Screenplay by: A. S. Prakasam
- Based on: Anuraag by Shakti Samanta
- Produced by: V. Ramasamy
- Starring: Kamal Haasan; Sridevi; Major Sundarrajan
- Cinematography: N. Karthikeyan
- Edited by: Panjabi; B. Lenin
- Music by: M. S. Viswanathan
- Production company: Sabari Cinis
- Release date: 19 October 1979
- Country: India
- Language: Tamil

Neela Malargal (transl. Blue Flowers) is a 1979 Indian Tamil-language film, directed by Krishnan–Panju. The film stars Kamal Haasan, Sridevi and Major Sundarrajan. It is a remake of the Hindi film Anuraag (1972). The film was released on 19 October 1979, and became a success.

== Cast ==
- Kamal Haasan as Doctor Chandiran
- Sridevi as Meena
- Major Sundarrajan as Ponnambalam
- K. R. Vijaya as Santhi
- Thengai Srinivasan as Kathavarayan Pillai
- Sukumari as Kamatchi
- Nagesh as Parthasarathy
- Malashri as Master Kannan
- Master Haja Sheriff as a student

== Production ==
Neela Malargal was the first Tamil film Haja Sheriff signed after previously acting in Malayalam films. Malashri, a then-child actress, played a boy.

== Soundtrack ==
The music was composed by M. S. Viswanathan. All songs were written by Kannadasan. The song "Pesum Manimottu Rojakkal" is based on the Mary Poppins song "Chim Chim Cher-ee".

Track listing
No.	Title	Singer(s)	Length
1.	"Idhu Irava Pagala"	K. J. Yesudas, Vani Jairam
2.	"Pesum Manimottu Rojakkal"	S. P. Balasubrahmanyam
3.	"Madham Oru"	P. Susheela
4.	"Andhaga Ooril Oru Raja"	S. Janaki

== Reception ==
Naagai Dharuman of Anna praised the acting of actors, Viswanathan's music and Krishnan–Panju's direction and concluded saying totally Neela Malargal will bring flowers of tears to the eyes.
