= Unnai Vaazhthi Paadugiren =

- Poster
- Directed by: Sridev
- Written by: Sridev
- Produced by: Kovaithambi
- Starring: Parthiban; Suman Ranganathan; Mohini
- Cinematography: M. V. Panneerselvam
- Edited by: M. N. Raja
- Music by: Ilaiyaraaja
- Production company: Motherland Pictures
- Release date: 7 February 1992
- Running time: 125 minutes
- Country: India
- Language: Tamil

Unnai Vaazhthi Paadukiren (transl. I will wish and sing for you) is a 1992 Indian Tamil-language romance film directed by Sridev in his debut and produced by Kovaithambi. The film stars Parthiban, Suman Ranganathan and Mohini. It was released on 7 February 1992.

== Plot ==
Ravi is a poor mechanic who works in the garage of and lives with his mother. He is very close to the owner so much that he sees him as his son. He is deeply in love with Priya, a rich girl. Priya hates him and flashback reveals that Ravi and Priya are married and hada marital breakdown because he lied to her that his mother was dead and about his financial status.

Priya stays with her parents who resent that she is staying with them instead of taking responsibility of her love marriage. In the meantime, Asha, another rich girl, falls in love with Ravi and she proposes to him. Ravi tells her that he is, in fact, Priya's husband and is working to convince Priya to live with him. The rest of the story is what happens to Ravi, Priya and Asha.

== Cast ==
- Parthiban as Ravi
- Suman Ranganathan as Priya
- Mohini as Asha
- V. K. Ramasamy
- Nassar as Asha's father
- J. V. Ramana Murthi as Priya's father
- Manorama as Ravi's mother
- Sangeeta as Priya's mother
- Senthil
- Kumarimuthu
- MRK
- Typist Gopu
- Vasu
- Prabhu Deva (special appearance)

== Production ==
The film marked the debut of director Sridev, and cinematographer M. V. Panneerselvam.

== Soundtrack ==
The soundtrack was composed by Ilaiyaraaja. The song "Oh Oh Oh Kaalai" uses the anupallavi of the Hindi song "Khoya Khoya Chand Khula Aasman" from Kala Bazar (1960).

Song	Singer(s)	Lyrics	Duration
"Ippodhum Nippen"	Mano	Vaali	4:57
"Oh Oh Oh Kaalai"	S. Janaki	Muthulingam	4:46
"Oru Maalai Chandiran"	Minmini, S. P. Balasubrahmanyam	Na. Kamarasan	4:52
"Oru Raagam"	K. J. Yesudas, S. Janaki	Piraisoodan	5:00
"Kurukkanikuthu"	Malaysia Vasudevan, Uma Ramanan	Vaali	4:12
"Kathukaruppu"	Malaysia Vasudevan, S. Janaki	Vaali	5:00
"Unnai Vaazhthi"	K. J. Yesudas	Gangai Amaran	4:50

== Reception ==
S. Chidambaram of The Indian Express wrote, "Debutant director Shridev, who has also penned the story, screenplay and dialogue, is able to keep your interest intact till the interval through a suspense [..] So you feel bored when the second part drags on" and called Ilaiyaraaja's music the "redeeming feature of this movie".
