= Mu. Metha =

Indian Tamil poet and lyricist (born 1945)

Muhammed Metha
- Born: Muhammed Metha; 5 September 1945 (age 81); Periyakulam, Madras Presidency, British India (now Theni district, Tamil Nadu, India)
- Occupations: Poet, lyricist, academic
- Writing career
- Pen name: Mu. Metha
- Language: Tamil
- Notable work: Akayathukku Aduthaveedu
- Notable awards: Sahitya Akademi Award (2006)

Muhammed Metha (born 5 September 1945), better known as Mu. Metha, is an Indian Tamil poet, academic and film lyricist. He received the Sahitya Akademi Award for Tamil in 2006 for his poetry collection Akayathukku Aduthaveedu.

== Early life and academic career ==
Metha was born in Periyakulam on 5 September 1945. He taught Tamil for decades at Presidency College, Chennai, including a long period as a professor there.

== Literary career ==
The Hindu has described Metha as having played a key role in popularising modern Tamil poetry (pudukkavithai) in the 1970s. Frontline identifies him with the Vanambadi school of Tamil poetry, a free-verse tradition associated with Left-leaning politics and public recitation.

According to The Hindu, he has authored 32 books, including poetry, novels, short-story collections and essays. His early poetry collection Kaṇṇīrppūkkāḷ (Kaneerpookal) appeared in 1974. His novel Sozha Nila (also rendered Chozha Nila) won first prize in a literary contest held for the golden jubilee of Ananda Vikatan.

In 2006 he received the Sahitya Akademi Award for Tamil for the poetry collection Agayathukku Adutha Veedu.

== Film career ==
Metha has written lyrics for Tamil films. The Hindu reported that he had composed 400 songs for movies. Songs associated with him include lyrics connected with films such as Udaya Geetham, Naan Sigappu Manithan, Idaya Kovil and Rettai Vaal Kuruvi.

In 2024 the Government of Tamil Nadu selected him for the Kalaignar Ninaivu Kalaithurai Vithagar Award for 2023, an honour for lifetime achievement in Tamil cinema. Chief Minister M. K. Stalin presented the award to Metha and playback singer P. Susheela in October 2024.

== Bibliography ==
=== Short story ===
- Mu. Metha Sirukathaigal (மு. மேத்தா சிறுகதைகள்)

=== Poetry ===
- Kaneerpookal (கண்ணீர்ப் பூக்கள்), 1974
- Oorvalam (ஊர்வலம்), 1977
- Manach Siragu (மனச்சிறகு), 1978
- Kanavuk Kuthiraikal (கனவுக்குதிரைகள்), 1992
- En Pillai Tamil (என் பிள்ளைத் தமிழ்), 1994
- Otrai Theekutchi (ஒற்றைத் தீக்குச்சி), 1997
- Akayathukku Aduthaveedu (ஆகாயத்துக்கு அடுத்த வீடு), 2004
- Kalaignarukkum Tamil Entru Per (கலைஞருக்கும் தமிழ் என்று பேர்), 2010
- Kanavugalin Kai Elzhuthu (கனவுகளின் கையெழுத்து), 2016
- Nayakam Oru Kaviyam (நாயகம் ஒரு காவியம்)
- Anbudan (அன்புடன்)
- Velicham Veliye Illai (வெளிச்சம் வெளியே இல்லை)

=== Essay ===
- Thirandha Puththagam (திறந்த புத்தகம்)
- Pakkam Paarthu Pesukiren (பக்கம் பார்த்து பேசுகிறேன்), 2008
- Pudhukkavithai Poraattam (புதுக்கவிதைப் போராட்டம்)
- Aduppukkari Thayaarippum Karuvael Mara Valarppum (அடுப்புக்கரி தயாரிப்பும், கருவேல் மர வளர்ப்பும்)
- Naanum En Kavithaiyum (நானும் என் கவிதையும்)
- Mu. Maeththaa Munnuraigal (மு.மேத்தா முன்னுரைகள்)

=== Others ===
- Mu. Metha Bathilgal (மு. மேத்தா பதில்கள்)

=== Novel ===
- Chozha Nila (சோழ நிலா)
- Maguda Nila (மகுட நிலா)
- Kottaiyai Nokki (கோட்டையை நோக்கி)
- Ithayavaasal (இதயவாசல்)
- Ninaiththadhu Negizhndhadhu (நினைத்தது நெகிழ்ந்தது)

== Awards ==
- Sahitya Akademi Award for Tamil (2006), for Akayathukku Aduthaveedu
- Kalaimamani award
- Pavendhar Bharathidasan Award (1986)
- Kalaivithagar award
- Kannadasan award
- K. A. P. Viswanatham award (2022)
- Kalaignar Ninaivu Kalaithurai Vithagar Award (2023; presented 2024)
- S. P. Adithanar Literary Award
