= Meesai Murugesan =

Indian film actor (1930–2014)

- Born: I. S. Murugesan; 13 January 1930; Idikarai, Coimbatore
- Died: 8 November 2014 (aged 84); Vadapalani, Chennai, India
- Occupations: Actor, musician
- Spouse: Kannama
- Children: 3
- Parent(s): Subramaniam Mudaliar, Ponnammal

Meesai Murugesan (13 January 1930 – 8 November 2014) was a veteran actor and musician who appeared in Tamil films. He starred in more than 100 films, as well as having supporting roles in various films.

== Music career ==
He started his career by playing the "Kottankuchi" (coconut shell), alongside great musicians such as K. P. Sundarambal, M. K. T. Bhagavathar, T. M. Soundararajan and Seerkazhi Govindarajan. He was popular for creating shrill sound effects in Nenjam Marappathillai and the footfall of the horse in the "Rajavin Paarvai Raniyin Pakkam" song in MGR-Saroja Devi's Anbe Vaa. He played instruments for music directors including M. S. Viswanathan, Ilayaraja and Kunnakudi Vaidyanathan.

He was a carnatic artist and had learned to play more than 25 instruments. He also ran a one-man band called "Apoorva Thalavaithiyangal" and held several concerts across the world including Europe, Canada, the United States and Russia.

== Film career ==
His career spanned more than 100 films and he was famous for his roles in Kamal Haasan's Unnal Mudiyum Thambi, Sathyaraj's Amaidhi Padai, Mohan's Uyire Unakkaga, Pandiarajan's Aan Paavam, and many others. He earned the name "Meesai Murugesan" after he sported a thick moustache in his first film Sugamana Raagangal.

== Awards ==
He was conferred Kalaimamani by the Tamil Nadu State government for his contribution to the cinema.

== Partial filmography ==
Year	Film	Role	Notes
1985	Sugamana Raagangal		
1985	Aan Paavam	Murugesan	
1985	Janani	Janani's father	
1985	Kalyanam Oru Kaalkattu		
1986	Kadaikan Paarvai		
1986	Thazhuvatha Kaigal		
1986	Aayiram Pookkal Malarattum		
1986	Oomai Vizhigal		
1986	Police Officer		Telugu
1986	Uyire Unakkaga	Murugesan Mudaliar	
1987	Chinna Thambi Periya Thambi		
1987	Meendum Mahaan		
1987	Mangai Oru Gangai		
1987	Paasam Oru Vesham		
1988	Unnal Mudiyum Thambi	Anjayya	
1988	Kalyana Paravaigal		
1988	Sigappu Thali		
1988	Paimarakappal		
1988	Thanga Kalasam		
1989	Athaimadi Methaiadi		
1989	Radha Kadhal Varadha		
1989	Sakalakala Sammandhi	Body Building Trainer	
1990	Pudhu Padagan	Kunjithapatham	
1990	Salem Vishnu	Vishnu's father	
1990	Vaazhkai Chakkaram		
1990	Sila Sasanam		Telugu
1990	Vetrimalai		
1991	Ennarukil Nee Irunthal	Vaidyar	
1993	Senthoorapandi	Meena's suitor's father	
1994	Amaidhi Padai		
1994	Sevvanthi		
1994	Killadi Mappillai		
1995	Chellakannu		
1995	Maaman Magal		
1995	Padikira Vayasula		
1995	Puthiya Aatchi		
1996	Poove Unakkaga	Velangiri	
1997	Kadavul		
1997	Pudhalvan		
1997	Thedinen Vanthathu		
1998	Kannathal		
2002	Gemini		
2008	Pirivom Santhippom	Natesan	

== Death ==
He died due to ill health and blood clots in his brain on 8 November 2014. He was 84 years of age and was survived by his wife, a son and two daughters.
