= M. G. Vallabhan =

- Born: 23 March 1943; Thrissur, Kerala
- Died: 2004
- Occupations: Journalist; Poet; Screenwriter
- Years active: 1979–1989

M. G. Vallabhan (1943–2004) was an Indian journalist, poet and screenwriter. Though born in Kerala, he wrote primarily in Tamil.

== Early life and career ==
Vallabhan was born in 23 March Perinjanam in Thrissur at Kerala. When his family shifted to Chennai, he studied and learnt Tamil despite Malayalam being his mother tongue. He made his debut as lyricist with the film Ponnu Oorukku Pudhusu (1979) where he wrote his first song "Solaikkuyile".

Vallabhan worked as a journalist for the film magazines Cinemalaya and Pesum Padam and also worked as editor for Bhagya magazine. He directed a film Thai Pongal (1980) and wrote screenplay and dialogues for many films.

== Discography ==
Year	Film	Songs	Notes
1979	Ponnu Oorukku Pudhusu	Solaikuyile	
1979	Poonthalir	Njan Njan, Kannin Mani	
1979	Karumbu Vil	Meenkodi Theril	
1979	Dharma Yuddham	Aagaya Gangai	
1979	Agal Vilakku	Nee Kannil	
1979	Uthiripookkal	Naan Paada	
1980	Thai Pongal	all songs	
1981	Nenjil Oru Mull	My Name	
1983	Bhagavathipuram Railway Gate	Kaalai Nera	
1983	Urangatha Ninaivugal	all songs	
1983	Mann Vasanai	Vangadi Vangadi	
1984	Nilavu Suduvathillai	Poove Pani Poove	
1984	Unnai Naan Santhithen	Unnai Kaanum	
1984	Vaazhkai	Mella Mella	
1985	Puthiya Theerpu	Rajamanam Senkarumbu	
1985	Udaya Geetham	Ennodu Paattu Paadungal	
1986	Oru Iniya Udhayam	Aatha, Madiyinil	
1986	Uyire Unakkaga	Ododi Vilayadum, Kavithaigal	
1987	Mangai Oru Gangai	Neeradi Vaa	

== Filmography ==
=== Director ===
- Thai Pongal (1980)

=== Writer ===
- Udaya Geetham (1985)
- Idaya Kovil (1985)
- Uyire Unakkaga (1986); dialogues only
- Mangai Oru Gangai (1987)
- Paadu Nilave (1987)
- Chinnappadass (1989)
