= Na. Kamarasan =

Indian poet and lyricist

- Born: Nachimuthu Kamarasan; 29 November 1942; B. Meenakshipuram, Madura District, Madras Province, British India (now in Theni District, Tamil Nadu, India)
- Died: 24 May 2017 (aged 74); Chennai, Tamil Nadu, India
- Occupations: Poet, lyricist
- Years active: 1976–2017
- Spouse: Logamani
- Children: 2

Nachimuthu Kamarasan (/kɑːmərɑːsən/ 29 November 1942 – 24 May 2017) was an Indian poet and lyricist who worked on Tamil-language films.

== Early life ==
Kamarasan was born on 29 November 1942 in B. Meenakshipuram, a town near Bodinayakkanur in present-day Theni District, Tamil Nadu. His mother was Lakshmi Ammal and his father was Nachimuthu.

In 1964, when he was a student of Thiagarasar Arts College, Madurai, he participated in the anti-Hindi protest and was imprisoned. He has a Master's Degree and worked as a Tamil Lecturer at Uttampalayam Haji Karutha Rauthar College and as an Officer in the Department of Translation in the Tamil Nadu Government Secretariat.

== Career ==
Though Kamarasan started writing poems in traditional verses with Surya Gandhi, he later switched to writing poems in formats like image poetry, free verse. Impressed by his poem compilation Karuppu Malargal, M. G. Ramachandran gave Kamarasan an opportunity to write lyrics for his film Needhikku Thalaivanangu and wrote his first film song "Kanavugale" and went on to write many songs for Ramachandran which he felt gave him the much needed freedom to write songs. Despite writing songs for films, he was not happy with the industry the way they treated him and other lyricists, for which he said "I used to make garlands and suddenly went to cut grass".

Kamarasan was the Vice-President of Khadar Board of Tamil Nadu during Ramachandran's regime. In 1991, he was appointed by Jayalalithaa as a member of the Tamil Nadu National Music and Drama Society.

== Personal life ==
Kamarasan was married to Logamani. They had a son and daughter. Kamarasan died on 24 May 2017 due to multiple organ failure.

== Awards ==
Kamarasan received the Bharathidasan award and the Kalaimamani award.

== Discography ==
Year	Film	Songs	Notes
1975	Idhayakkani	Thotta Idam Ellam	
1975	Pallandu Vaazhga	Poi Vaa Nadhi	
1976	Needhikku Thalaivanangu	Kanavugale Aayiram, Ethanai Manithargal	
1976	Oorukku Uzhaippavan	Iravu Padagan	
1977	Nandha En Nila	Oru Kadhal Samrajyam	
1977	Indru Pol Endrum Vaazhga	Welcome Hero	
1977	Navarathinam	Puriyathathai Puriyavaikkum	
1982	Agaya Gangai	Mega Deepam	
1983	Vellai Roja	Oh Maane Maane	
1983	Thanga Magan	Adukku Malligai	
1983	Mundhanai Mudichu	Velakku Vecha	
1983	Mella Pesungal	Kadhal Sagathu	
1984	Nerupukkul Eeram	Kannil Ondru	
1984	Vellai Pura Ondru	Thenuruthe Aasaiyo	
1984	Anbulla Rajinikanth	Muthumani Chudare	
1984	Naan Paadum Paadal	Paadum Vaanambaadi	
1984	Oh Maane Maane	Oh Devan	
1984	Rusi	Poraduthe Idhayam	
1984	Neengal Kettavai	Naane Raja	
1984	January 1	Puthandu Pootathu	
1984	Ingeyum Oru Gangai	Oru Villa Nenachu	
1984	Nallavanukku Nallavan	Chitukku Chella	
1984	Puyal Kadantha Bhoomi	Malairaniye	
1984	Kai Kodukkum Kai	Kannukulle Yaaro	
1984	Osai	Poove Poove	
1985	Pudhiya Sagaptham	Puyal Veesiyatho	
1985	Chinna Veedu	Jaakiratha	
1985	Paadum Vaanampadi	Adi Kanne, Aatathil Naanthan	
1985	Pudhu Yugam	Poovo Ponno	
1985	Udaya Geetham	Maane Thene	
1985	Chain Jayapal	Kaveri Meen Vazhi	
1985	Kaakki Sattai	Vaanile Thenila	
1985	Andha Oru Nimidam	Thevai Indha Paavai	
1986	Manithanin Marupakkam	Kannanai Kanpaya	
1986	Kodai Mazhai	Thuppakki Kaiyil	
1986	Manthira Punnagai	Manthira Punnagaiyo, Pavala Malligai, Naan Kadhalil Oru	
1986	Dharma Pathini	Mottuthan Idhu	
1987	Kadhal Parisu	Kanalukkul Meen	
1987	Rettai Vaal Kuruvi	Kannan Vandhu	
1988	Solla Thudikuthu Manasu	Enathu Vizhi	
1988	Enga Ooru Kavakkaran	Arumbagi	
1990	Amman Kovil Thiruvizha	Vaasamulla	
1990	Periya Veetu Pannakkaran	Malligaiye Malligaiye	
1990	Maruthu Pandi	Singara Selvangale	
1990	Vellaiya Thevan	Vaanathil Irundhu	
1991	Perum Pulli	Varudhu Varudhu	
1991	Sir... I Love You	Vaanambadi, Vaathiyare	
1991	Pudhu Manithan	Nilavukku Thalattu	
1991	Ennarukil Nee Irunthal	Indhira Sundaraiye, Oh Unnala, Nilave Nee, Udhayam Neeye	
1991	Archana IAS	Araigurai Baashai	
1992	Ilavarasan	Kaattu Paravaigal	
1992	Nadodi Pattukkaran	Chithirathu There Vaa	
1992	Unnai Vaazhthi Paadugiren	Oru Maalai Chandran	
1993	Thangakkili	Naan Deva Devi	
1994	Vandicholai Chinraasu	Barota Barota	
