= Thai Pongal (film) =

- Directed by: M. G. Vallabhan
- Written by: M. G. Vallabhan
- Produced by: M. Arunachalam
- Starring: Radhika; Vijayan
- Cinematography: Ramendra Roy
- Edited by: V. Rajagopal
- Music by: Ilaiyaraaja
- Production company: Anjaneya Combines
- Release date: 30 May 1980
- Country: India
- Language: Tamil

Thai Pongal (/ˈθaɪˈpoʊŋɡəl/) is a 1980 Indian Tamil-language film written and directed by M. G. Vallabhan. The film stars Radhika and Vijayan. It was released on 30 May 1980, and failed at the box office.

== Cast ==
- Radhika as Tamilselvi
- Vijayan
- Rajesh
- Chakravarthy
- Sudhakar as a teacher (guest appearance)
- Saritha as Sorna (guest appearance)
- Writer Sujatha as himself (guest appearance)

== Production ==
Thai Pongal is the only directorial credit of lyricist and screenwriter M. G. Vallabhan.

== Soundtrack ==
The music was composed by Ilaiyaraaja, with lyrics by the director Vallabhan. The opening portions of the song "Kanmalargalin" sampled "Money, Money, Money" by ABBA. The song "Theertha Karaithaniley" became highly popular.

Track listing
No.	Title	Singer(s)	Length
1.	"Theertha Karaithaniley"	K. J. Yesudas, Jency
2.	"Kanmalargalin"	Ilaiyaraaja, S. Janaki
3.	"Thanesathiradum"	S. Janaki, B. S. Sasirekha
4.	"Panivizhum Poo Nilavil"	Malaysia Vasudevan, S. P. Sailaja
5.	"Theertha Karaithaniley"	Jency

== Reception ==
Kanthan of Kalki wrote there is nothing wrong with making a good compelling screenplay into a film and getting an 'A' certificate, but writing the story, scripting and setting the scenes just to get an A certificate is disgusting.
