= R. Selvaraj =

Indian screenwriter and director

- Born: Sivagangai, Madura District (now Sivagangai district, Tamil Nadu), Madras Presidency, British India
- Occupations: Film director, Screenwriter, Producer
- Years active: 1974–present
- Spouse: Savithri
- Relatives: N. Sankaraiah (paternal uncle)
- Awards: Kalaimamani Award (1999)

R. Selvaraj, also credited as "Annakili" Selvaraj, is an Indian screenwriter and director. He worked predominantly in the Tamil film industry, as well as in very few Tollywood, and Kannada film industries. His most famous film is Annakili. Vijayakanth's film career started with Selvaraj's 1979 release Agal Vilakku. He appeared in Doorathu Idi Muzhakkam. Selvaraj also worked closely with Barathiraja and Manirathnam.

== Biography ==
Selvaraj was born either in Thiruvenkatapuram (on the bank of the Vaigai River in Madurai) or in Sivaganga (his mother's hometown). His father, a native of Thoothukudi, was from a family who supported the Self-Respect Movement.

His father's younger brother N. Sankaraiah (1921–2023) was a renowned Indian Independence activist and former State Secretary of the Tamil Nadu unit of the Communist Party of India (Marxist).

His son Dinesh Selvaraj is a director who has made films like Thuppakki Munai.

== Filmography ==
=== Writer ===
==== Films ====
- Engamma Sapatham - 1974
- Ammayila Sapatham - 1975 (Telugu)
- Annakili - 1976
- Kavikkuyil - 1977
- Kizhakke Pogum Rail - 1978
- Puthiya Vaarpugal - 1979
- Toorpu Velle Railu - 1979 (Telugu)
- Kotha Jeevithalu - 1981 (Telugu)
- Nanna Devaru - 1982 (Kannada)
- Pudhumai Penn - 1984
- Idaya Kovil - 1985
- Udaya Geetham - 1985
- Muthal Mariyathai - 1985
- Geethanjali - 1985
- Paadu Nilave - 1987
- Kodi Parakuthu - 1988
- Sone Pe Suhaaga - 1988 (Hindi)
- Pudhu Nellu Pudhu Naathu - 1991
- Pudhu Manithan - 1991
- Chinna Gounder - 1992
- Chinarayudu - 1992 (Telugu)
- Captain Magal - 1993
- Sakkarai Devan - 1993
- Koyil Kaalai - 1993
- Raasaiyya - 1995
- Anthimanthaarai - 1996
- Mommaga - 1997 (Kannada)
- Agni IPS - 1997 (Kannada)
- Azhagarsamy - 1999
- Taj Mahal - 1999
- Alaipayuthey - 2000
- Pottu Amman - 2000
- Eera Nilam - 2003
- Rebel - 2015 (Kannada)

==== Television ====
- Sreeraman Sreedevi (2003) (Vijay TV)

=== Direction ===
- Ponnu Oorukku Pudhusu - 1979
- Agal Vilakku - 1979
- Bhagavathipuram Railway Gate - 1983
- Neethana Andha Kuyil - 1986
- Sigappu Nirathil Chinnappoo - 1990

== Awards ==
- Kalaimamani Award - 1999
