= B. Meenakshipuram =

- Town
- Nickname: Meenakshi
- Location in Tamil Nadu, India B. Meenakshipuram (India)
- Coordinates: 10°0′9″N 77°23′15″E
- Country: India
- State: Tamil Nadu
- District: Theni
- Zone: Madurai

Population (2001)
  - Total: 7,207

Languages
  - Official: Tamil
- Time zone: UTC+5:30 (IST)

B. Meenakshipuram is a panchayat town in Bodinayakanur Taluk, Theni district Located in Madurai Region in The state of Tamil Nadu, India.

== Demographics ==
As of 2001 India census, B. Meenakshipuram had a population of 7207. Males constitute 50% of the population and females 50%. B. Meenakshipuram has an average literacy rate of 55%, lower than the national average of 59.5%; with 60% of the males and 40% of females literate. 10% of the population is under 6 years of age.
