= Payanangal Mudivathillai =

1982 film by R. Sundarrajan

- Theatrical release poster
- Directed by: R. Sundarrajan
- Screenplay by: R. Sundarrajan
- Story by: Kovaithambi (Note: Though the story is credited to Kovaithambi, he has stated that the story was actually Sundarrajan's.)
- Produced by: R. Elanchelian; Pollachi M. V. Rathinam; P. Muthusamy
- Starring: Mohan; Poornima Jayaram
- Cinematography: Kasthuri
- Edited by: R. Bhaskaran
- Music by: Ilaiyaraaja
- Production company: Motherland Pictures
- Release date: 26 February 1982
- Running time: 133 minutes
- Country: India
- Language: Tamil
- Budget: ₹13 lakh

Payanangal Mudivathillai (transl. Journeys never end) is a 1982 Indian Tamil-language romantic drama film written and directed by R. Sundarrajan. The film stars Mohan and Poornima Jayaram, with Rajini, S. Ve. Shekher, Poornam Viswanathan, Rajesh and Goundamani in supporting roles. Its plot revolves around a woman who falls in love with a singer whom she helped to rise to fame but struggles to declare her love for him.

Payanangal Mudivathillai is Sundarrajan's directorial debut and the inaugural venture of Kovaithambi's Motherland Pictures. The film was produced by R. Elanchelian, Pollachi M. V. Rathinam and P. Muthusamy. Ilaiyaraaja composed the music and S. P. Balasubrahmanyam and S. Janaki performed the songs. Cinematography was handled by Kasthuri and the editing by R. Bhaskaran.

Payanangal Mudivathillai was released on 26 February 1982 and it was shown in theatres for over a year, becoming a silver jubilee film. Both of the lead actors won Filmfare Awards in their respective categories. The film was remade in Hindi as Kalaakaar (1983).

== Plot ==
Radha, a wealthy young woman, visits Suseela, her friend in Madras who is participating in a contest, and writes a song for her. The paper on which Radha has written the song blows away and lands near the neighbouring house, where an aspiring singer Ravi Kumar and his friend Selvam live. Ravi finds the paper, writes music to accompany Radha's song and sings it which Radha overhears. Impressed, she anonymously helps Ravi get a chance to sing at the inauguration of a temple and to win a chance to perform in a television programme.

When Ravi meets Radha for the first time at the television studio, he composes and sings a song praising her in the programme, which is publicly appreciated. Radha uses her contacts to get Ravi work singing for a film; he achieves instant success and fame, and moves to a spacious house. Radha continues to support Ravi in every activity and his career grows. When Radha's father wants to arrange her marriage with his sister's son Mohan, she says she wants to marry Ravi but waits for the right time to tell Ravi. Though Ravi admires Radha, he has not yet expressed his love to her.

Radha becomes restless when Ravi goes on tour; he returns earlier than scheduled but does not contact Radha and avoids her. At a function held to honour him, Ravi claims sole responsibility for his success, much to Radha's disappointment. Radha is anxious; she meets Ravi to share her father's plan for her marriage, hoping she will be able to express her love for him. Ravi does not react; he cheerfully tells her he would sing at her wedding for free as a token of gratitude, shattering Radha. Unable to see his daughter's depression, Radha's father arranges for her to marry Mohan.

When Mohan lands in Madras, Ravi, his acquaintance, gives him a lift to a function. Mohan, a doctor, tells Radha and her father, who are waiting for him, Ravi is his patient and has been diagnosed with terminal blood cancer. Radha is shocked and tries to contact Ravi, who does not respond to her calls because he wants her to think he is ungrateful and to marry someone else. She calls Ravi again; Mohan picks up the telephone and learns she and Ravi were in love. When Radha calls again, Mohan allows Ravi to speak to Radha, who says she has consumed poison because she does not want to live without him. Mohan and Ravi rush to Radha's house, only to see her die. Traumatised, Ravi also dies.

== Cast ==
- Mohan as Ravi Kumar
- Poornima Jayaram as Radha
- Rajini as Suseela
- S. Ve. Shekher as Selvam
- Poornam Viswanathan as Radha's father
- Rajesh as Mohan
- Goundamani as a house owner

The uncredited cast includes Gangai Amaran, Venkat Prabhu and Premji as themselves while Thavakalai Chittibabu plays a boy dancing to the song "Yeh Aatha".

== Production ==
According to Kovaithambi, in 1981 when he was a rising politician, R. Sundarrajan and his friend Sirumugai Ravi approached him, narrated a story and suggested he produce it as a film. Though he liked the story, Kovaithambi was hesitant to enter the film industry but agreed after being encouraged by fellow politician C. Aranganayagam. Shortly thereafter, Kovaithambi established Motherland Pictures and Sundarrajan's story became the company's inaugural venture Payanangal Mudivathillai, making Sundarrajan's directorial debut. Sundarrajan was initially meant to contribute only as screenwriter but was encouraged to turn director by Kovaithambi. Despite establishing the company, Kovaithambi was not credited as producer; credit was instead given to R. Elanchelian, Pollachi M. V. Rathinam and P. Muthusamy, while Kovaithambi was credited for the story. Kasthuri was signed as cinematographer and R. Bhaskaran was engaged for editing.

The filmmakers wanted to feature mostly newcomers in the film, but none came forward because Kovaithambi was a politician and Sundarrajan was a first-time director. Kovaithambi considered casting Mohan in the lead role after being impressed with his performance in Nenjathai Killathe (1980); Mohan agreed after listening to the story. The makers initially wanted S. P. Balasubrahmanyam to dub Mohan's voice but he refused so they chose S. N. Surendar. Suresh was initially supposed to be the male lead but could not continue after having an accident. Poornima Bhagyaraj (then known as Poornima Jayaram) was cast as the female lead after the filmmakers saw her in Manjil Virinja Pookkal (1980). She was initially reluctant to accept the film because it was directed by a newcomer but accepted after learning the music composer was Ilaiyaraaja. Payanangal Mudivathillai was made on a budget of ₹13 lakh (equivalent to ₹2.7 crore or US$280,000 in 2023) and was completed within four months.

== Soundtrack ==
The soundtrack for Payanangal Mudivathillai was composed by Ilaiyaraaja and the lyricists were Vairamuthu, Gangai Amaran and Muthulingam. The soundtrack was released on the label Echo Records.

== Marketing ==
According to K. P. Sunil of The Illustrated Weekly of India, Payanangal Mudivathillai was the first Indian film to have "larger-than-life cut-outs" of its composer. While the theatrical posters initially credited Sundarrajan for the story, his name was later replaced with that of Kovaithambi.

== Release and reception ==
Payanangal Mudivathillai was released on 26 February 1982. A private screening was earlier held for M. G. Ramachandran, the Chief Minister of Tamil Nadu, in the second week of the month. Ramachandran appreciated the film and told Kovaithambi he would touch the peak of success in a week. In a review dated 21 March, the Tamil magazine Ananda Vikatan said the beauty of the screenplay is stunning, and the songs composed by Ilaiyaraaja and the singing of Balasubrahmanyam are the two pillars of the film, giving it a rating of 48 out of 100. On the same day, Thiraignani of Kalki too printed a positive review, primarily for Mohan and Poornima's performances, the cinematography and the direction. The film ran for over a year in theatres, thereby becoming a silver jubilee film. Its success led to Motherland producing more films starring Mohan as a singer. At the 30th Filmfare Awards South, Mohan won the Filmfare Award for Best Actor – Tamil, and Poornima won the Filmfare Award for Best Actress – Tamil. The film was remade in Hindi as Kalaakaar (1983).

== Bibliography ==
- Dhananjayan, G. (2011). The Best of Tamil Cinema, 1931 to 2010: 1977–2010. Galatta Media. OCLC 733724281.
