= Ilamai Kaalangal =

- Theatrical release poster
- Directed by: Manivannan
- Written by: Manivannan
- Produced by: Pollachi M. V. Ratnam
- Starring: Mohan; Sasikala; Rohini
- Cinematography: A. Sabhapathy
- Edited by: R. Bhaskaran
- Music by: Ilaiyaraaja
- Production company: Motherland Pictures
- Release date: 19 August 1983
- Country: India
- Language: Tamil

Ilamai Kaalangal (transl. The times of youth) is a 1983 Indian Tamil-language film written and directed by Manivannan. The film stars Mohan, Sasikala and Rohini. It was released on 19 August 1983.

== Plot ==
Rosie and Raghu are college mates that fall in love. Rosie's father, Inspector David, is aware of their love. He approves but requests the couple to focus on their education first and foremost. Raghu's parents expect him to marry Meera. Raghu's friends and fellow college students, Kannan, Jana and two others gang rape a young woman that ran away from home with her boyfriend. The young couple commit suicide and Inspector David finds clues to tie students from the college to the crime. To distract the inspector from the investigation, the rapists arrange for a college strike using Raghu as an excuse. The strike turns violent and Kannan kills Inspector David. Rosie dumps Raghu as she thinks he started the strike. She eventually gets a job working for Kannan who pursues her romantically. Jana loses his mind with guilt and wanders the streets. Raghu is withdrawn and depressed. Raghu's father insists he marry Meera or leave the house. Raghu chooses to leave and struggles to make ends meet. Kannan, Raghu and Rosie's paths cross continually until a culminating event forces a confrontation.

== Cast ==
- Mohan as Raghu
- Sasikala as Rosie
- Rohini as Meera
- Balaji as Kannan
- Anuradha
- Vennira Aadai Moorthy
- A.R.S as Inspector David
- Sukumari as Stella
- Senthamarai as Raghu's father
- S. N. Parvathy as Raghu's mother
- Senthil
- Meghala
- Janagaraj as Jana

== Production ==
Ilamai Kaalangal is the debut film for Balaji, and Sasikala and Rohini in leading roles.

== Soundtrack ==
The soundtrack was composed by Ilaiyaraaja. The song "Eeramana Rojave" is set in the Carnatic raga known as Madhyamavati, "Isaimedaiyil Intha Velayil" is set in Darbari Kanada, "Padavanthatho Gaanam" is set in Chandrakauns, and "Ragavane Ramana" is set to Suddha Dhanyasi.

Song	Singers	Lyrics
"Padippile Zero, Nadippile Hero"	S. P. Sailaja	Gangai Amaran
"Paada vanthatho Gaanam"	P. Susheela, K. J. Yesudas	Vairamuthu
"Raagavane Ramanaa"	P. Susheela	Muthulingam
"Isai Medaiyil Intha Velaiyil"	S. Janaki, S. P. Balasubrahmanyam	Vairamuthu
"Yogam Ulla Raani"	Malaysia Vasudevan, S. P. Sailaja	Vairamuthu
"Eeramaana Rojaave"	K. J. Yesudas	Vairamuthu
"Vaada En Veeraa"	Malaysia Vasudevan	Gangai Amaran

== Release and reception ==
Ilamai Kaalangal was released on 19 August 1983. Jayamanmadhan of Kalki appreciated Ilaiyaraaja's music and Sabhapathy's cinematography.

== Bibliography ==
- Sundararaman (2007) [2005]. Raga Chintamani: A Guide to Carnatic Ragas Through Tamil Film Music (2nd ed.). Chennai: Pichhamal Chintamani. OCLC 295034757.
