= Kizhakke Pogum Rail =

1978 film by Bharathiraja

- Theatrical release poster
- Directed by: Bharathirajaa
- Screenplay by: Bharathirajaa
- Dialogues by: R. Selvaraj; K. Bhagyaraj (additional)
- Story by: R. Selvaraj
- Produced by: S. A. Rajkannu
- Starring: Sudhakar; M. R. Radikaa
- Cinematography: P. S. Nivas
- Edited by: T. Thirunavukkarasu
- Music by: Ilaiyaraaja
- Production company: Sri Amman Creations
- Distributed by: Sri Amman Creations
- Release date: 10 August 1978
- Running time: 124 minutes
- Country: India
- Language: Tamil

Kizhakke Pogum Rail (pronounced [kiɻɐk:eː poːɡum ɾɐjil] transl. Eastbound Train) is a 1978 Indian Tamil-language romantic drama film co-written and directed by Bharathirajaa, starring Sudhakar and M. R. Radikaa in their acting debut. It was released on 10 August 1978 and ran for over 365 days in theatres. The film was remade in Telugu as Toorpu Velle Railu (1979) by Bapu, and in Hindi by Bharathiraja as Saveray Wali Gaadi (1985).

== Plot ==
Panchali, a young woman, gets off a train named 'Kizhakke Pogum Rail' (Eastbound Train) and lands in the village Thamaraikulam, which follows strict rules. There, she is accommodated by her sister Karuthamma and brother-in-law Ramaiah. Panchali informs Karuthamma of their's death a few days earlier. Ramaiah starts to have an eye on Panchali.

Paranjothi is an unemployed graduate who lives with his father Maruthu and sister Kanniyamma. Maruthu is a barber and considers Paranjothi a good-for-nothing like all the villagers. After getting married, Kanniyamma leaves her birth home to live with her husband's family.

Panchali and Paranjothi slowly fall in love with each other. One day, the villagers spot Paranjothi running behind Panchali. At the gram panchayat, the panchayat members blame Paranjothi for trying to misbehave with Panchali. Only the retired soldier Pattalathaar and the farmer Ponnandi support him, but the panchayat members overlook them and punish him. Maruthu shaves off Paranjothi's hair, and have him paraded through the streets of the village while riding a donkey, whereas Ramaiah forces Karuthamma to burn Panchali's arm with a piece of wood.

After the humiliation, Maruthu commits suicide in the village's lake. Paranjothi decides to leave the town, and he promises Panchali that he will come back to marry her. He also informs her that he will write a message on the last compartment of the 'Kizhakke Pogum Rail'. In the city, after several interviews, he finally finds a decent job.

Meanwhile, at the village court, Ramaiah complains that Karuthamma is a barren woman, and he expresses his wish to marry Panchali. A few days later, the village is battered by heavy rains. To stop the rain, the villagers contrive the way to stop it, executing an ancient belief: one virgin woman has to walk naked around the village at sunrise. Unexpectedly, Panchali is chosen to be that woman.

The day of the ritual, Paranjothi gladly returns at his village, and he sees Panchali completely naked. He gives her clothing, and they both run away from the angry villagers. Pattalathaar helps the couple by stalling the villagers, but he is killed in the process. The lovers manage to catch the running 'Kizhakke Pogum Rail', evading the villagers.

== Cast ==
- Sudhakar as Paranjothi
- M. R. Radikaa as Panchali
- Gandhimathi as Karuthamma
- Goundamani as Ramaiah
- G. Srinivasan as Maruthu
- K. K. Soundar as the village president
- Vijayan as Pattalathaar
- V. Janagarajan as Iyer (Panchayat member)
- K. Bhagyaraj as Ponnandi
- Usha as Kanniyamma
- Bharathiraja as the station master (uncredited)

== Production ==
Kizhakke Pogum Rail was the second film directed by Bharathiraja, and the debut film of Sudhakar and Radikaa (credited as M. R. Radikaa) as actors. The male lead role was originally offered to Sivachandran, who declined, while Sridevi was originally cast as the lead actress but later opted out. Radikaa's screen test was done with Sridevi's clothes from 16 Vayathinile (1977) since she did not have any Indian clothes after coming from London. Radikaa contemplated leaving the film throughout the shoot, but was "offered chocolates" to complete the film. It was also the Tamil debut for Vijayan, and the feature film debut of Usha. The producer originally offered K. Bhagyaraj to direct, but he declined as he wanted to finish at least two more films as an assistant. Bhagyaraj remained as an assistant director. One part of the song "Poovarasampoo" was filmed at a temple off East Coast Road, while the rest of the song was filmed at Mettupalayam.

R. Selvaraj revealed the initial story for Kizhakke Pogum Rail had the character of Panchali character arriving to Chennai to visit Paranjothi, get molested by four young people by which she gets mentally affected and meets with an accident with Paranjothi saving her; however Selvaraj felt something was missing in the script and conveyed this to Bharathiraja for which he stopped the shoot. Selvaraj read a French novel where a queen will be walking naked at night on the streets to abolish tax which he added in the script. After changing the complete screenplay, the shoot was restarted. Bharathiraja was discontent with Radhika's then-sounding "baby" voice but after trying twenty dubbing artists, he decided to use her original voice. According to Vairamuthu, the climax featured in the film was completely Bhagyaraj's idea.

== Soundtrack ==
The soundtrack was composed by Ilaiyaraaja. The song "Kovil Mani Osai" is set to the Carnatic raga known as Shuddha Saveri, "Malargale" is set to Hamsadhvani, "Poovarasam Poo Poothachu" and "Mancholai Kilithano" are set to Suddha Dhanyasi.

Song	Singer(s)	Lyrics	Length
"Kovil Mani Osai"	Malaysia Vasudevan, S. Janaki	Kannadasan	4:43
"Maancholai Kili Thaano"	Jayachandran	Muthulingam	4:40
"Poovarasampoo Poothachu"	S. Janaki	Gangai Amaran	4:42
"Malargalae… Naadhaswarangal"	Malaysia Vasudevan, S. Janaki	Sirpi Balasubramaniam	4:04

== Release and reception ==
Kizhakke Pogum Rail was released on 10 August 1978, and distributed by Sri Amman Creations. Ananda Vikatan rated the film 55 out of 100, appreciating its latter half and the climax for its realism. Naagai Dharuman of Anna praised the acting of cast, music, direction, dialogues, and visual poetry. The film became a major commercial success, completing a 365-day run in theatres, and Radikaa briefly became known by the sobriquet Rayil Radikaa. Malaysia Vasudevan won the Tamil Nadu State Film Award for Best Male Playback Singer for singing in the film.

== Remakes ==
Kizhakke Pogum Rail was remade in Telugu as Toorpu Velle Railu (1979) by Bapu, and in Hindi as Saveray Wali Gaadi (1986) by Bharathiraja himself.

== Bibliography ==
- Dhananjayan, G. (2011). The Best of Tamil Cinema, 1931 to 2010: 1977–2010. Galatta Media. OCLC 733724281.
- Rajadhyaksha, Ashish; Willemen, Paul (1998) [1994]. Encyclopaedia of Indian Cinema. British Film Institute and Oxford University Press. ISBN 0-19-563579-5.
- Sundararaman (2007) [2005]. Raga Chintamani: A Guide to Carnatic Ragas Through Tamil Film Music (2nd ed.). Pichhamal Chintamani. OCLC 295034757.
