= Poornam Viswanathan =

Indian actor

- Born: 14 November 1921
- Died: 1 October 2008 (aged 86); Chennai, Tamil Nadu, India
- Occupations: Actor, radio news reader
- Years active: 1968-2002
- Spouse: Susila
- Children: 3

Poornam Viswanathan (14 November 1921 – 1 October 2008) was an Indian actor who predominantly appeared in Tamil films. He started performing on stage at age 18. He worked as a reader for All India Radio and was the first person in India to announce India was independent on August 15 in All India Radio. He went on to act in films such as Chithram, Varusham 16, Thillu Mullu, Keladi Kanmani, Moondram Pirai, Aasai, Mahanadhi and Varumaiyin Niram Sivappu. He had a son and two daughters. Viswanathan died on 1 October 2008.

== Career ==
Viswanathan was known for his remarkable performances in Tamil theatre and films. In every role he played, he paid great attention to dialogue delivery and body language.

He started performing on stage when he was 18. He later moved to New Delhi for a few years, where he was part of the South Indian troupe with dance and music critic Subbudu. Viswanathan worked as a news reader at All India Radio and deemed it a matter of great pride to have announced the news of India obtaining independence in the first news bulletin broadcast on 15 August 1947.

He was transferred to Chennai in 1964. His portrayal of roles in plays scripted by Marina, such as Thanikuduthanam, Oor Vambu and Kaal Kattu, won him great acclaim. His performances in plays such as Kadavul Vandirundar, Adimaigal and Oonjal were similarly hailed by audiences. His passion for theatre inspired him to start a troupe of his own, called Poornam New Theatres.

He served the Press Information Bureau in Chennai as an assistant information officer and later served as editor of Thittam and senior correspondent for Yojana, magazines brought out by the Union Information and Broadcasting Ministry. He penned several plays and short stories. He was very interested in the fine arts and was often spotted at Sabhas during the December music festival.

He was known in Kollywood for his peculiar voice modulation.

He also starred in the Bollywood blockbuster Ek Duje Ke Liye (1981), in which he played the role of Kamal Hassan's strict father.

He was also known to Malayalam audiences for his role in the blockbuster Chithram with Mohanlal.

== Filmography ==
This is a partial filmography. You can expand it.

=== Tamil ===
Year	Title	Role	Notes
1968	Uyarndha Manithan	Ranganathan	
1970	Vilaiyaattu Pillai	Palace Secretary	
1970	Thirumalai Thenkumari		
1972	Idhaya Veenai	Kumarasamy	
1972	Mr. Sampath		
1973	Sollathaan Ninaikkiren	Viswanath	
1973	Gowravam	Climax Judge	
1973	Rajapart Rangadurai	Jilla Collector	
1973	Ganga Gowri		Guest Appearance
1974	Thanga Pathakkam		Guest Appearance
1974	Naan Avanillai		
1974	Dikkatra Parvathi		
1975	Ninaithadhai Mudippavan		
1975	Melnaattu Marumagal	Palanivel	
1979	Ninaithale Inikkum	Sona's father	Uncredited role
1979	Naan Vazhavaippen		
1979	Pattakkathi Bhairavan		
1980	Mazhalai Pattalam	Sivaraman's boss	Bilingual film
1980	Guru	Raghu's father	
1980	Idhayam Pesugirathu		
1980	Varumayin Niram Sivappu	Sundaram Pillai	
1981	Thillu Mullu	Doctor	
1981	Garjanai		
1981	Aani Ver		
1981	Oruthi Mattum Karaiyinile		
1981	Ranuva Veeran		
1982	Moondram Pirai	Srinivas's Boss	
1982	Vadamalai		
1982	Pudukavithai		
1982	Archanai Pookal		
1982	Payanangal Mudivathillai		
1982	Agni Sakshi		
1983	Urangatha Ninaivugal	Uma's father	
1983	Oru Indhiya Kanavu		
1983	Samayapurathale Satchi		
1983	Puthisali Paithiyangal		
1984	Vidhi		
1984	Tharaasu		
1984	Osai		
1984	Kai Kodukkum Kai		
1984	Unnai Naan Santhithen	Doctor	
1985	Padikkadavan	Vedhachalam	
1985	Aan Paavam		
1985	Kalyana Agathigal		
1985	Geethanjali		
1986	Dharma Pathini	Kamalanathan	
1987	Kadhal Parisu		
1987	Solvathellam Unmai	Dr. Sundaramoorthy	
1987	Mangai Oru Gangai		
1987	Paruva Ragam		
1988	Khooni Insaan		
1988	Kan Simittum Neram		
1988	Therkathi Kallan		
1988	Uzhaithu Vaazha Vendum		
1989	Varusham Padhinaaru	Family Head	
1989	Siva		
1989	Varusham 16		
1989	Ore Oru Gramathiley	Sankara Sastri	
1989	Pudhu Pudhu Arthangal	Goa Resident	
1990	Keladi Kanmani	Saradha's father	
1990	Vedikkai En Vadikkai	Aalolasingam	
1990	Anjali		
1990	Raja Kaiya Vacha		
1990	Velai Kidaichuduchu		
1991	Gopura Vasalile		
1991	Pudhu Manithan		
1991	Nee Pathi Naan Pathi		
1991	Adhikari		
1991	Abhimanyu		
1992	Meera		
1992	Sugamana Sumaigal		Guest Appearance
1993	Thalattu		
1994	Mahanadhi	Panjapakesan Iyer (Krishna's Cellmate)	
1994	Manasu Rendum Pudhusu	Narayanan Iyer	
1995	Aasai	Yamuna's father	
1995	Chinna Chinna Aasai- Pooja		TV Serial
1996	Thuraimugam		
1996	Siraichalai	Mukundh's dad	Guest Appearance
1999	Akshaya		TV Serial
2002	Thamizhan	Passenger in a bus	(final film role)

=== Malayalam ===
Year	Title	Role	Notes
1988	Chithram	Ramendra Menon	
1988	Aryan		
1991	Abhimanyu		
1994	Pingami		Guest Appearance

=== Telugu ===
Year	Title	Role
1979	Andamaina Anubhavam	
1980	Guru	Raghu's father
1989	Mouna Poratam	

=== Other languages ===
Year	Title	Role	Language	Notes
1980	Makkala Sainya		Kannada	Bilingual film
1981	Ek Duuje Ke Liye	V. Sivaramakrishan	Hindi	
