= Muthulingam (poet) =

Indian Tamil poet and songwriter (born 1942)

Subbiah Muthulingam
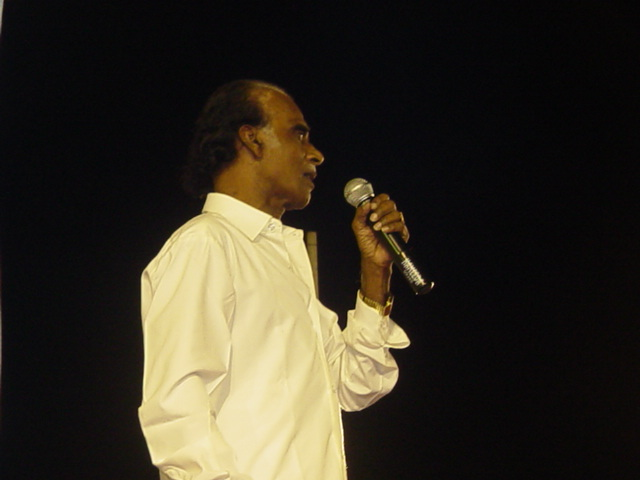
- Born: 1942 (age 83–84); Kadampankudi, Madura District, Madras Province, British India (now in Sivagangai district, Tamil Nadu, India)
- Occupations: Poet, lyricist
- Writing career
- Years active: 1973-present

Subbiah Muthulingam (born 20 March 1942) is an Indian songwriter. He wrote over 1,500 Tamil film songs, and was the winner of Kalaimamani, Pavender Bharathidasan Award, Best Songwriter Award, Artist Award. Muthulingam was appointed as the Tamil Nadu poet laureate in 1980s by the then Tamil Nadu's Chief Minister M.G. Ramachandran and was also a Member of Legislative Council (MLC), before it was abolished.

== Early life ==
Muthulingam was born in 1942 in Kadambangudi, Sivagangai district. Self-employment, agriculture. Educated till the final class of school. He wrote his first poem when he was 15 years old.

== Career ==
Muthulingam made his debut as lyricist with the song "Thanjavoor Seemaiyile" for the film Ponnukku Thanga Manasu.

== Awards ==
- Kapilar Award of the Government of Tamil Nadu for the year 2013
- Bavender Bharathidasan Award
- Kalaithurai Vidhdhakar Award
- Kalaimamani Award - 1981

== Filmography ==
=== Lyricist ===
==== 1970's ====
1. 1973– Ponnukku Thanga Manasu
2. 1976– Uzhaikkum Karangal
3. 1976– Oorukku Uzhaippavan
4. 1976– Unarchigal
5. 1977– Meenava Nanban
6. 1977– Indru Pol Endrum Vaazhga
7. 1978– Madhuraiyai Meetta Sundharapandiyan
8. 1978– Vayasu Ponnu
9. 1978– Kizhakke Pogum Rail
10. 1978– En Kelvikku Enna Bathil
11. 1979– Puthiya Vaarpugal
12. 1979– Uthiripookkal
13. 1979– Suvarilladha Chiththirangal
14. 1979 – Pappathi
15. 1979 – Kamasasthiram

=== 1980's ===
1. 1980- Kadhal Kiligal
2. 1980- Bhama Rukmani
3. 1980- Oru Kai Osai
4. 1980- Enga Ooru Rasathi
5. 1980– Ellam Un Kairasi
6. 1980-Oru Velladu Vengaiyagiradhu
7. 1980- Nandrikarangal
8. 1980- Engal Vathiyar
9. 1981– Ranuva Veeran
10. 1981– Mouna Geethangal
11. 1981- Mouna Yutham
12. 1981– Indru Poi Naalai Vaa
13. 1981- Panimalar
14. 1982– Thooral Ninnu Pochchu
15. 1982– Antha Rathirikku Satchi Illai - "Sumaithangiye"
16. 1982– Valibamey Vaa Vaa
17. 1982– Gopurangal Saivathillai
18. 1982– Moondru Mugam
19. 1982– Darling, Darling, Darling
20. 1982– Payanangal Mudivathillai
21. 1982- Oorukku Oru Pillai
22. 1982- Manjal Nila
23. 1982- Marumagale Vazhga
24. 1983- Thoongatha Kannindru Ondru
25. 1983– Mundhanai Mudichu
26. 1983– Bhagavathipuram Railway Gate
27. 1983– Ilamai Kaalangal
28. 1983– Thanga Magan
29. 1983– Kashmir Kadhali
30. 1983– Vellai Roja
31. 1984– Chiranjeevi
32. 1984– Family
33. 1984– Theerppu En Kaiyil
34. 1984– Dhavanik Kanavugal
35. 1984– Vellai Pura Ondru
36. 1984– Nooravathu Naal
37. 1984– Madras Vathiyar
38. 1984– Naan Paadum Paadal - 2 songs
39. 1984– Nallavanukku Nallavan
40. 1984– Ambigai Neril Vanthaal
41. 1984– Kuzhanthai Yesu
42. 1984- Puthiya Sangamam
43. 1985- Paadum Vaanampadi
44. 1985– Idaya Kovil
45. 1985- Mookkanankayiru
46. 1985– Karaiyai Thodatha Alaigal
47. 1985– Mannukketha Ponnu
48. 1985– Raja Rishi
49. 1985– Udaya Geetham
50. 1985- Thiramai
51. 1985- Karuppu sattaikkaran
52. 1986– Muthal Vasantham
53. 1986- Mounam Kalaikirathu
54. 1986– Unakkaagave Vaazhgiren
55. 1986– Naan Adimai Illai
56. 1986– Meendum Pallavi
57. 1986– Uyire Unakkaga - 1 song
58. 1986– Mannukkul Vairam
59. 1986– Enakku Naane Neethipathi
60. 1986- Karimedu Karuvayan
61. 1986- Namma Ooru Nalla Ooru
62. 1987– Poovizhi Vasalile
63. 1987– Koottu Puzhukkal
64. 1987– Kadhal Parisu
65. 1987– Mupperum Deviyar
66. 1987– Sirai Paravai
67. 1988– Senthoora Poove
68. 1988– Unnal Mudiyum Thambi
69. 1988– En Bommukutty Ammavukku
70. 1988– Idhu Namma Aalu
71. 1988– Puthiya Vaanam
72. 1988– Thambi Thanga Kambi
73. 1989– Solaikuyil
74. 1989– Vetri Mel Vetri
75. 1989– En Purushanthaan Enakku Mattumthaan

=== 2000s ===
1. 2000- Kadhal Rojave
2. 2008- Uliyin Osai
3. 2004- Virumaandi

=== Actor ===
- Maya Kannadi (2007) - struggling actor
