= List of Tamil films of 1983 =

Post-amendment to the Tamil Nadu Entertainments Tax Act 1939 on 1 April 1958, Gross jumped to 140 per cent of Nett Commercial Taxes Department disclosed ₹40 crore in entertainment tax revenue for the year.

The following is a list of films produced in the Tamil film industry in India in 1983, in alphabetical order.

== 1983 ==
Title	Director	Producer	Music	Cast
Aanandha Kummi	Gokula Krishnan	Ilaiyaraaja Films	Ilaiyaraaja	Bhanuchander, Ashwini, Goundamani, Senthil
Aayiram Nilave Vaa	A. S. Pragasam	New Wave Pictures	Ilaiyaraaja	Karthik, Sulakshana, Silk Smitha, Nagesh
Adutha Varisu	S. P. Muthuraman	Dwarkish Chitra	Ilaiyaraaja	Rajinikanth, Sridevi, Silk Smitha, S. Varalakshmi, Cho, Manorama
Alai Payum Nenjangal	H. Ramesh	D & PG Productions	Shankar–Ganesh	Suresh, Sujatha, Rajesh, Ilavarasi
Anal Kaatru	Komal Swaminathan	Cine Friends	Shankar–Ganesh	Rajesh, Delhi Ganesh, Vanitha
Anney Anney	Moulee	Kalaivani Productions	Ilaiyaraaja	Moulee, Sumithra, Viji
Antha Sila Naatkal	Venkat	Meenakshi Finance	Ilaiyaraaja	Mohan, Poornima Jayaram, Manorama, Nithya, Silk Smitha, Dhilip
Apoorva Sahodarigal	R. Thyagarajan	Devar Films	Bappi Lahiri	Karthik, Suhasini, Radha, Suresh, Urvashi, Jaishankar, K. R. Vijaya
Bhagavathipuram Railway Gate	R. Selvaraj	B. S. Films	Ilaiyaraaja	Karthik, Rajyalakshmi, Thiagarajan, Silk Smitha
Bramacharigal	Swarnamoorthy	Jubilee Creations	M. S. Viswanathan	Suresh, Sulakshana, S. Ve. Shekher, Vanitha
Dhooram Adhighamillai	Robert–Rajasekar	Annam Movies	Shankar–Ganesh	Karthik, Viji
Dowry Kalyanam	Visu	Charu Chithra Films	M. S. Viswanathan	Vijayakanth, Visu, Srividya, Viji, S. Ve. Shekher, Kismu, Manorama
En Aasai Unnoduthan	K. Narayanan	Lotus Film Company	Shankar–Ganesh	Prem, Poornima
En Priyame	Sivakumar	Balakumaran Movies	Gangai Amaran	Raveendran, Viji
Ennai Paar En Azhagai Paar	N. S. Maniam	Sri Annai Moogambigai Films	Ilaiyaraaja	Jaishankar, Thiagarajan, Vijayakumar, Silk Smitha, Jayamalini, Jyothi Lakshmi
Gramathu Kiligal	Sanjeevi Ganesh	Jubilee Arts	Maniraja	Rajeev, Subhadra
Idhu Enga Naadu	Rama Narayanan	Kalai Ezhil Combines	M. S. Viswanathan	Suresh, Sulakshana
Ilamai Kaalangal	Manivannan	Motherland Pictures	Ilaiyaraaja	Mohan, Sasikala, Balaji, Rohini
Ilayapiravigal	A. Irudaya Raj	Sri Vijayalakshmi Productions	Shankar–Ganesh	Rajeev, Mahalakshmi, Anuradha
Imaigal	R. Krishnamurthy	Vivekanandha Pictures	Gangai Amaran	Sivaji Ganesan, Saritha, Sarath Babu, Rajyalakshmi, Y. G. Mahendra, Goundamani, Silk Smitha, Jayamalini
Indru Nee Naalai Naan	Major Sundarrajan	Geetha Kamalam Movies	Ilaiyaraaja	Sivakumar, Jaishankar, Lakshmi, Sulakshana, Thengai Srinivasan
Inimai Idho Idho	R. Ramalingam	Geethalaya Art Films	Ilaiyaraaja	Chandresekhar, Rajendra Prasad, Nisha
Jodi Pura	V. K. Ramasamy	V. K. R. Productions	Shankar–Ganesh	V. K. R. Raghunath, Vyjayanthimala
Jothi	Manivannan	Thai Creations	Ilaiyaraaja	Mohan, Ambika, Silk Smitha
Kai Varisai	Prem Kumar	Sarala Agencies	Shankar–Ganesh	Jaishankar, Seema
Kalvadiyum Pookal	V. Karthigeyan	Ravi Ben Cine Arts	Shyam	Sreenath, Nizhalgal Ravi, Nalini, Lavanya, Manorama
Kaman Pandigai	H. S. Venu	Santhya Thaai films	Shankar–Ganesh	K. R. Vijaya, Srikanth
Kann Sivanthaal Mann Sivakkum	Sreedhar Rajan	Cine India Productions	Ilaiyaraaja	Vijay Mohan, Poornima Jayaram, Jaishankar, Rajesh, Jayamala
Kasappum Inippum	C. R. Devaraj	A. M. S. Creations	B. K. Jawahar	Srikanth, Vijay Babu, Jayavani, Srikamu, V. K. Padmini
Kashmir Kadhali	Mathioli Shanmugam	Chithra Priya Cine Arts	G. K. Venkatesh	Rajani Sharma, Rajkumar
Kodugal Illatha Kolam	L. Balu	Pazhani Murugan Movies	G. Devarajan	Sujatha, Ramakrishna, Y. G. Mahendra
Kokkarakko	Gangai Amaran	Pavalar Creations	Ilaiyaraaja	Mahesh, Ilavarasi, Silk Smitha
Maarupatta Konangal	N. Murugesh	Jeppiar Pictures	Shankar–Ganesh	Karthik, Jalaja
Malaiyoor Mambattiyan	Rajasekhar	Sri Devi Bagavathy Films	Ilaiyaraaja	Thiagarajan, Saritha, Jaishankar, Silk Smitha, Jayamalini, Goundamani, Senthil
Manaivi Illatha Neram	A. Jagannathan	Kalaivanar Films		
Manaivi Solle Manthiram	Rama Narayanan	Everest Films	Ilaiyaraaja	Mohan, Nalini, Pandiyan, Ilavarasi
Mann Vasanai	Bharathiraja	Gayathri Films	Ilaiyaraaja	Pandiyan, Revathi, Anitha, Vijayan
Mella Pesungal	Bharathi-Vasu	Kanya Creations	Ilaiyaraaja	Vasanth, Bhanupriya, Y. G. Mahendra
Miruthanga Chakravarthi	K. Shankar	Bhairavi Films	M. S. Viswanathan	Sivaji Ganesan, K. R. Vijaya, Prabhu, Sulakshana, Thengai Srinivasan, Manorama, Y. G. Mahendra
Mundhanai Mudichu	K. Bhagyaraj	AVM Productions	Ilaiyaraaja	K. Bhagyaraj, Urvashi, Deepa
Muthu Engal Sothu	G. N. Rangarajan	Kumaravel Films	Ilaiyaraaja	Prabhu, Radha, Rajeev, Geetha, Vanitha
Naalu Perukku Nandri	M. R. Rajamani	Sree Durga Cine Arts	M. S. Viswanathan	Mohan, Poornima Jayaram, Kismu
Naan Sootiya Malar	C. S. Govindarajan	Kanaga Durai Movies	Chandrabose	Vijayakanth, Bharathi Mohan, Subhadra, Goundamani
Naan Unna Nenachen	G. V. Saravanan	Sri Velumani Films	Shankar–Ganesh	Jayaraj, Poornima Naidu, Silk Smitha
Neeru Pootha Neruppu	K. Vijayan	Vadalooran Combines	Stalin Varadharajan	Ramesh, Vijayalakshmi
Neethibathi	R. Krishnamurthy	Suresh Arts	Gangai Amaran	Sivaji Ganesan, K. R. Vijaya, Sujatha, Prabhu, Radhika, Y. G. Mahendra
Nenjamellam Neeye	K. Rangaraj	Indira Creation	Shankar–Ganesh	Mohan, Radha, Poornima Jayaram, Goundamani, Thiagarajan, Geetha
Nenjodu Nenjam	T. Janaki Ram	Kadambari Films	M. S. Viswanathan	Gemini Ganesan, Lakshmi, Radhika
Onnu Theriyadha Pappa	S. S. Vikram	Singam Movies		Nizhalgal Ravi, Anand Babu, Nassar, Silk Smitha, Surekha, Sindhu, Meenakshi
Oppantham	Vijaya Ganesh	Garuda Films	Ilaiyaraaja	Sripriya, Srikanth, Gemini Ganesan, Goundamani
Oru Indhiya Kanavu	Komal Swaminathan	Shri Muthiyallammal Creations	M. S. Viswanathan	Suhasini, Rajeev, Lalitha
Oru Kai Paappom	S. P. Muthuraman	Vetri Vinayagar Creations	Vijaya Bhaskar	Karthik, Visu, Radha, Manorama
Oru Odai Nadhiyagirathu	C. V. Sridhar	Chithraalaya Films	Ilaiyaraaja	Raghuvaran, Sumalatha, Manochithra, Prathapachandran
Oru Pullanguzhal Aduppuppthugirathu	Moulee	Ponmalar International	Shyam	S. Ve. Shekher, Poornima Rao, Moulee
Paayum Puli	S. P. Muthuraman	AVM Productions	Ilaiyaraaja	Rajinikanth, Radha, Jaishankar, Thiagarajan, V. K. Ramasamy, Manorama, Y. G. Mahendra, Silk Smitha
Penmayin Unmai	Charles Selva	Educative Movie India		
Poikkal Kudhirai	K. Balachander	Kalaivani Productions	M. S. Viswanathan	Viji, Ramakrishna, Vaali, Raveendran
Puthisali Paithiangal	Raghu	Rajkumar Investments	Shankar–Ganesh	Suresh, Sulakshana
Raagangal Maaruvathillai	Sirumugai Ravi	Vasan Productions	Ilaiyaraaja	Prabhu, Ambika
Saatchi	S. A. Chandrasekhar	Veeralakshmi Combines	Shankar–Ganesh	Vijayakanth, Viji
Salangai Oli	K. Viswanath	Poornodaya Movie Creations	Ilaiyaraaja	Kamal Haasan, Jaya Prada, Sarath Babu
Samsaram Enbadhu Veenai	S. A. Chandrasekhar	Shridevi Priya Pictures	Shankar–Ganesh	Suman
Sandhippu	C. V. Rajendran	Sivaji Productions	M. S. Viswanathan	Sivaji Ganesan, Sujatha, Sridevi, Prabhu, Radha
Saranalayam	R. Sundarrajan	Ashtalakshmi Pictures	M. S. Viswanathan	Mohan, Nalini
Saattai Illatha Pambaram	N. Murugesh	Punitha Cine Arts	Ilaiyaraaja	Sivakumar, Saritha, Cho
Sattathukku Oru Saval	M. Karnan	Vasan Brothers	Shankar–Ganesh	Suman, Madhavi
Sattam	K. Vijayan	Sujatha Cine Arts	Gangai Amaran	Kamal Haasan, Madhavi, Sarath Babu, Jaishankar, Manorama, Y. G. Mahendra, Sathyakala, Silk Smitha
Seerum Singangal	Rama Narayanan	Sri Thenandal Films	Shankar–Ganesh	Suresh, Nalini, S. Ve. Shekher
Shasti Viratham	R. Thyagarajan	Devar Films	Shankar–Ganesh	Sivakumar, Poornima Jayaram
Sivappu Sooriyan	V. Srinivasan	Muktha Films	M. S. Viswanathan	Rajinikanth, Saritha, Radha, Y. G. Mahendra, Silk Smitha
Silk Silk Silk	Y. V. Gopikrishnan	Sri Ganesh Kalamandir	M. S. Viswanathan	Silk Smitha, Bhanu Chander, Raghuvaran
Soorakottai Singakutti	Rama Narayanan	AVM Productions	Ilaiyaraaja	Prabhu, Silk Smitha, Gemini Ganesan, Prameela
Soorapuli	Venkat	Jai Geetha Movies	Shankar–Ganesh	Prabhu, Ambika, Y. G. Mahendra
Subha Muhurtham	Raghu	Indralayam Productions	Shankar–Ganesh	S. Ve. Shekher, Sulakshana
Sumangali	D. Yoganand	Alankar Films	M. S. Viswanathan	Sivaji Ganesan, Sujatha, Prabhu, Y. G. Mahendra, Geetha, Silk Smitha
Thai Veedu	R. Thyagarajan	Devar Films	Shankar–Ganesh	Rajinikanth, Anita Raj, Jaishankar, Suhasini, Silk Smitha
Thalaimagan	M. R. Vijayachander	R. V. Creations	Shankar–Ganesh	Prabhu, Suresh, Vijayashanti, Vanitha, Manorama
Thambathigal	N. S. Rajendran	Muktha Films	M. S. Viswanathan	Sivakumar, Poornima Jayaram, Jaishankar, Silk Smitha, Goundamani
Thandikkappatta Nyayangal	M. Bhaskar	Oscar Films	Shankar–Ganesh	Sivakumar, Lakshmi, Rohini, Y. G. Mahendra
Thanga Magan	A. Jagannathan	Sathya Movies	Ilaiyaraaja	Rajinikanth, Poornima Jayaram, Jaishankar, Silk Smitha
Thangaikkor Geetham	T. Rajendar	Thanjai Cine arts	T. Rajendar	Sivakumar, T. Rajendar, Saritha, Nalini, Anand Babu
Thodi Ragam	Ramki	Balasubramanya Movies	Kunnakudi Vaidyanathan	T. N. Seshagopalan, Nalini
Thoongatha Kannindru Ondru	R. Sundarrajan	Bagavathi Creations	K. V. Mahadevan	Mohan, Ambika, S. Ve. Shekher
Thoongathey Thambi Thoongathey	S. P. Muthuraman	AVM Productions	Ilaiyaraaja	Kamal Haasan, Radha, Sulakshana, Jamuna, Goundamani
Thudikkum Karangal	C. V. Sridhar	K. R. G. Films	S. P. Balasubrahmanyam	Rajinikanth, Radha, Jaishankar, Sujatha, Vijayakumar, Y. G. Mahendra, Silk Smitha, Vanitha
Unmaigal	R. C. Sakthi	Blue Moon Movies	M. S. Viswanathan	Lakshmi, Rajkumar
Urangatha Ninaivugal	R. Bhaskaran	Sugandhavani Films	Ilaiyaraaja	Sivakumar, Radhika, Menaka, Rajeev, Silk Smitha
Uruvangal Maralam	Ramji	R3 Pictures	S. V. Ramanan	Y. G. Mahendra, Suhasini, S. Ve. Shekher, Silk Smitha
Uyirullavarai Usha	T. Rajendar	Thanjai Cine Arts	T. Rajendar	Saritha, T. Rajendar, Ganga, Nalini, Goundamani
Valarthakada	Kandasami-Singaram	Mekalai Films	Shankar–Ganesh	Suresh, Viji, Manoj, Rohini
Veetula Raman Veliyila Krishnan	Manivannan	Panchu Arts	Ilaiyaraaja	Sivakumar, Radhika, Suhasini
Vellai Roja	A. Jagannathan	Filmco	Ilaiyaraaja	Sivaji Ganesan, Prabhu, Ambika, Radha, Suresh, Y. G. Mahendra, Silk Smitha
Villiyanur Matha	K. Thangappan	Suguna Films	G. Devarajan	Sarath Babu, Vijayashanti, Y. G. Mahendra, Prameela, Sangeetha
Yamirukka Bayamen	K. Shankar	Revathi Cine Arts	M. S. Viswanathan	Vijayakumar, Jai Ganesh, Saritha, Fatafat Jayalaxmi, Manorama
Yudhakaandam	Komal Swaminathan	Kalaikoodam	M. S. Viswanathan	Pratap K. Pothen, Suhasini, Raveendran
Yuga Dharmam	K. S. Gopalakrishnan	Karpagam Studios	Ilaiyaraaja	K. R. Vijaya, Sulakshana, Rajesh, Rajeev, Poornima Devi, Y. G. Mahendra
