= Karthika Deepam (film) =

1979 film by Lakshmi Deepak

- Poster
- Directed by: Lakshmi Deepak
- Screenplay by: Lakshmi Deepak
- Story by: M. Prabhakar Reddy
- Produced by: G. Radhadevi Gupta; A. Krishnaiah
- Starring: Sobhan Babu; Sarada; Sridevi
- Cinematography: J. Satyanarayana
- Edited by: K. Balu
- Music by: Satyam
- Production company: Kavitha Films
- Release date: 10 May 1979
- Country: India
- Language: Telugu

Karthika Deepam is a 1979 Indian Telugu-language drama film directed by Laxmi Deepak and starred Sobhan Babu, Sarada, and Sridevi. Sobhan Babu won the Filmfare Award for Best Actor.

The movie was a based on the 1971 Tamil film Thenum Paalum, It was later remade in Hindi as Maang Bharo Sajana (1980), in Tamil again as Karpoora Deepam (1985) and in Kannada as Sowbhagya Lakshmi (1987).

== Cast ==
- Sobhan Babu in a dual role as
  - Sridhara Rao
  - Raja, Sridhara Rao's son
- Sarada as Raja's adoptive mother
- Sridevi as Radha, Raja's biological mother
- Geetha as Geetha
- M. Prabhakar Reddy as Dhananjaya Rao, Geetha's father
- Rajababu as Sridhara Rao's assistant
- Allu Ramalingaiah
- Suryakantham
- Rama Prabha
- Shubha
- Girija
- Attili Papa
- Sri Vani
- Mada Venkateswara Rao
- Potti Prasad
- K. V. Chalam as Driver
- Gummadi
- Leelavathi
- Y. G. Mahendran

== Music ==
The music was composed by Satyam.

Track listing
No.	Title	Lyrics	Singer(s)	Length
1.	"Aaraneekuma Ee Deepam"	Devulapalli Krishnasastri	P. Susheela, S. Janaki	4:22
2.	"Chilakamma Palikindhi"	Narala Rami Reddy	S. P. Balasubrahmanyam, S. Janaki	3:44
3.	"Chooda Chakkani Daana"	Gopi	S. P. Balasubrahmanyam, P. Susheela	2:54
4.	"Muvvalemo Nedemo"	C. Narayana Reddy	S. Janaki	3:13
5.	"Ey Maata Aha Telusu Adi Kaadu"	Gopi	S. P. Balasubrahmanyam, P. Susheela	3:46
6.	"Nee Kowgililo"	Gopi	S. P. Balasubrahmanyam, S. Janaki	3:18

== Release and reception ==
The film was released on 10 May 1979. Prasad, reviewing the film for Zamin Ryot on 18 May 1979, praised the treatment and execution of the story, particularly appreciating Sridevi's performance.

== Awards and nominations ==
Award	Year	Category	Recipient	Result	Ref.
Filmfare Awards South	1980	Best Actor – Telugu	Sobhan Babu	Won	
Filmfare Awards South	1980	Best Actress – Telugu	Sridevi	Nominated	
