= John Jani Janardhan =

John Jani Janardhan may refer to:

- John Jani Janardhan (1984 film), a Hindi film
- John Jani Janardhan (2016 film), an unrelated Kannada comedy drama film
