= Thanga Magan =

Thanga Magan, literally translated from Tamil as "Golden Son", may refer to:

- Thanga Magan (1983 film), directed by A. Jagannathan, starring Rajinikanth and Poornima in the lead roles
- Thanga Magan (2015 film), directed by Velraj, starring Dhanush, Samantha and Amy Jackson in the lead roles
