= Mr. X (1987 film) =

- Directed by: Khwaja Ahmad Abbas
- Screenplay by: Khwaja Ahmad Abbas
- Produced by: Manmohan Sabir
- Starring: Amol Palekar; Shabana Azmi
- Music by: Ravindra Jain
- Release date: 27 December 1984
- Country: India
- Language: Hindi

Mr. X is a 1984 film, directed and written by Khwaja Ahmad Abbas. The music was scored by Ravindra Jain.

== Plot ==
The story is based on science fiction, featuring the character Amar (Amol Palekar), a scientist who overcomes all obstacles. The lead characters are played by Amol Palekar and Shabana Azmi.

== Cast ==
Actor	Role	Other
Amol Palekar	Amar	A Scientist
Shabana Azmi	Geeta	Amar's Love Interest
Yogita Bali		
Imtiaz Khan	Ramesh Tejwani	The Antagonist
Parikshit Sahni		Police Inspector
Jairaj		
Tun Tun		
Asit Sen		
Chandrashekhar		Police Commissioner
Jankidas		
Tom Alter		
Yunus Parvez	Guest Appearance	
Alka Nupur	Guest Appearance	
David		
Amjad Khan	Narrator	

== Soundtrack ==
Song	Singer
Saturday Ki Raat Ko	Hemlata
Parda Gazab Dhaye Parda	Hemlata, Mahendra Kapoor, Sushil Kumar
