= Jai Karoli Maa =

Jai Kiaroli Maa
- Directed by: Ram Pahwa
- Produced by: Ranjit Saman
- Starring: Arun Govil; Alka Nupur; Amrit Pal; Urmila Bhatt; Bharat Bhushan
- Music by: Ravindra Jain
- Production company: T-Series
- Release date: 1 January 1988
- Country: India
- Language: Hindi

Jai Karoli Maa is an Indian movie directed by Ram Pahwa which was released in 1988. The movie is based on the religious theme based on Karoli Maa of Hindu religion.

== Soundtrack ==
Lyrics and music by Ravindra Jain. Songs sung by Mahendra Kapoor, Suresh Wadkar, Hemlata and Anuradha Paudwal.
