= Karpoora Deepam =

- Directed by: A. Jagannathan
- Screenplay by: A. L. Narayanan
- Story by: M. Prabhakar Reddy
- Produced by: Mylai R. V. Gurupatham
- Starring: Sivakumar; Sujatha; Ambika; Goundamani
- Cinematography: P. Ganesa Pandiyan
- Edited by: P. R. Gautham Raj
- Music by: Gangai Amaran
- Production company: G. R. P. Arts
- Release date: 31 May 1985
- Country: India
- Language: Tamil

Karpoora Deepam is a 1985 Indian Tamil-language film, directed by A. Jagannathan. The film stars Sivakumar, Sujatha, Ambika and Goundamani. It is a remake of the Telugu film Karthika Deepam, which was inturn based on the 1971 Tamil film Thenum Paalum. The film was released on 31 May 1985.

== Plot ==
Sivakumar and Sujatha are a happily married couple with a daughter. Their son falls in love. The father of the son's love interest is a wealthy man Senthamarai. Initially unwilling, both the families finally agree to marry their children. On the wedding day, Senthamarai tries to stop the marriage stating that the bride (son) is not the child of their parents. Sivakumar takes us to the flashback from thereon. It is revealed that Sivakumar had a love interest Ambika in the past who is the mother of his son (the bridegroom). He delays marrying her since he's already married to Sujatha. Things take a turn when both Sujatha and Ambika befriend each other. Towards the climax, Sujatha finds out that Ambika and Sivakumar have a son together and confronts her. She bursts out in anger which makes Ambika sick. Ambika becomes bedridden and in her death bed, Sivakumar ties the knot to her with Sujatha's blessings. But she embraces death handing over her son to Sujatha-Sivakumar duo. In return from flashback, Senthamarai apologises and agress to the marriage and the film ends with their marriage.

== Cast ==
- Sivakumar
- Sujatha
- Ambika
- Ashwini
- Goundamani
- SR Sivagami
- Manorama
- Kovai Sarala

== Soundtrack ==
The soundtrack was composed by Gangai Amaran, with lyrics by Vaali.

Track listing
No.	Title	Singer(s)	Length
1.	"Vaa Maalai Neram"	S. P. Balasubrahmanyam, S. Janaki	4:21
2.	"Kaalam Kaalamai"	P. Susheela, S. Janaki	4:20
3.	"Vilakketri"	S. P. Balasubrahmanyam, S. Janaki	4:47
4.	"Malligai Poovile"	S. N. Surendar, S. Janaki	4:20
Total length:			17:48

== Reception ==
Jayamanmadhan of Kalki felt it has become a fashion to give new colour to old plots and added all the actors performed well but none of them gets registered in the mind and concluded that director should be asked for this.
