= Erimalai =

- Title card
- Directed by: Gopi Krishna
- Written by: P. Selvakumar
- Produced by: Muralidharan
- Starring: Thiagarajan; Saritha; Sulakshana
- Cinematography: Gajendramani
- Edited by: L. Kesavan
- Music by: M. S. Viswanathan
- Production company: Prathanna Art Creations
- Release date: 22 March 1985
- Country: India
- Language: Tamil

Erimalai (transl. Volcano) is a 1985 Indian Tamil-language action film directed by Gopi Krishna and written by P. Selvakumar. The film stars Thiagarajan, Saritha and Sulakshana. It was released on 22 March 1985.

== Cast ==
- Thiagarajan in three roles
- Saritha
- Sulakshana
- Vinu Chakravarthy
- Sivachandran
- Nalinikanth
- Ravikumar
- Sathyaraj
- Sathyakala
- Jyothi
- Jayamalini

== Soundtrack ==
The music was composed by M. S. Viswanathan, with lyrics by Vaali.

Track listing
No.	Title	Singer(s)	Length
1.	"Nee Solli Kodu"	S. P. Balasubrahmanyam, S. Janaki
2.	"Oru Naal Iravu"	Vani Jairam
3.	"Elaikkai Malaimele"	M. S. Viswanathan and chorus
4.	"Ore Bashayil"	K. J. Yesudas, S. Janaki

== Release and reception ==
Erimalai was released on 22 March 1985. Jayamanmadhan of Kalki praised Gopikrishna's direction, Gajendramani's cinematography and Viswanathan's music and concluded calling it an interesting two-and-a-half hours for those in a rush, with popcorn and chilli fritters in hand.
