= Athirshtam Azhaikkirathu =

- Poster
- Directed by: A. Jagannathan
- Written by: Vaali
- Produced by: Jagannathan; Meenakshi Sundaram
- Starring: Sowcar Janaki; Thengai Srinivasan
- Cinematography: V. Selvaraj; P. Ganesa Pandian
- Edited by: Vijay Anand
- Music by: V. Kumar
- Production company: J. M. Productions
- Release date: 13 August 1976
- Country: India
- Language: Tamil

Athirshtam Azhaikkirathu (transl. Luck beckons) is a 1976 Indian Tamil-language film directed by A. Jagannathan and written by Vaali. The film stars Sowcar Janaki and Thengai Srinivasan. It was released on 13 August 1976.

== Cast ==
- Sowcar Janaki
- Thengai Srinivasan
- R. Muthuraman
- Srividya
- K. Balaji
- Vijayakumar
- Major Sundarrajan
- Mahendran
- V. Gopalakrishnan
- M. R. Krishnasamy
- Pandari Bai
- Leelavathi
- Jayasudha
- Sachu
- K. J. Yesudas
- Suvarna
- Usilai Mani

== Production ==
Bharathiraja was an assistant director. The film was shot at Vauhini Studios. M. G. Ramachandran, who was shooting another film in the same studio, noticed Srinivasan inebriated and declared he was perfectly cast for Athirshtam Azhaikkirathu.

== Soundtrack ==
The music was composed by V. Kumar, with lyrics by Vaali.

Track listing
No.	Title	Singer(s)	Length
1.	"Arthamulla Indu Matham"	T. M. Soundararajan
2.	"Enna Thavam"	P. Susheela, Ramola, T. M. Soundararajan
3.	"Oru Kudumbam"	P. Susheela

== Reception ==
Kanthan of Kalki praised Srividya's performance and said Janaki was the pulse of the film, but criticised a subplot featuring two engineers in love as distracting to the main plot.
