= Alka Nupur =

Indian actress (born 1957)

Alka Nupur Varshney
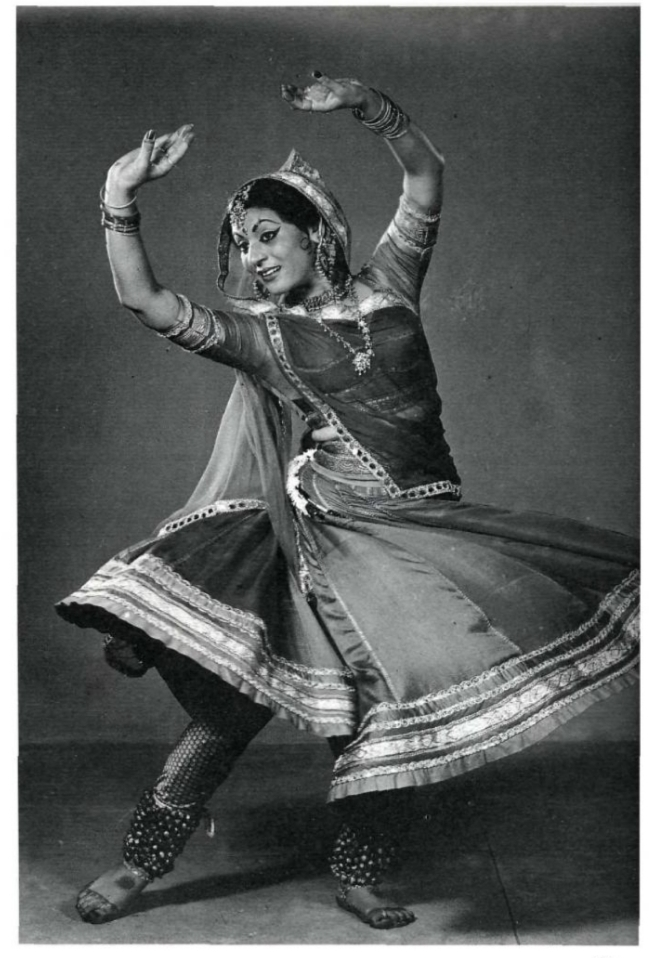
- Nupur in arabasque after completion of a toda
- Born: 1957 (age 68–69); Aligarh, Uttar Pradesh, India
- Occupation: Actress
- Years active: 1979–1989
- Notable work: Laawaris (1981); Brij Bhoomi (1982); John Jani Janardhan (1984); Mohabbat Ke Dushman (1988)
- Spouse: Banwari Lal Varshney

Alka Nupur is a former Indian actress who was best known for her contributions to Hindi cinema throughout the 1980s. She appeared in many films throughout her career, including Laawaris (1981), Brij Bhoomi (1982), John Jani Janardhan (1984), and Mohabbat Ke Dushman (1988).

== Career ==
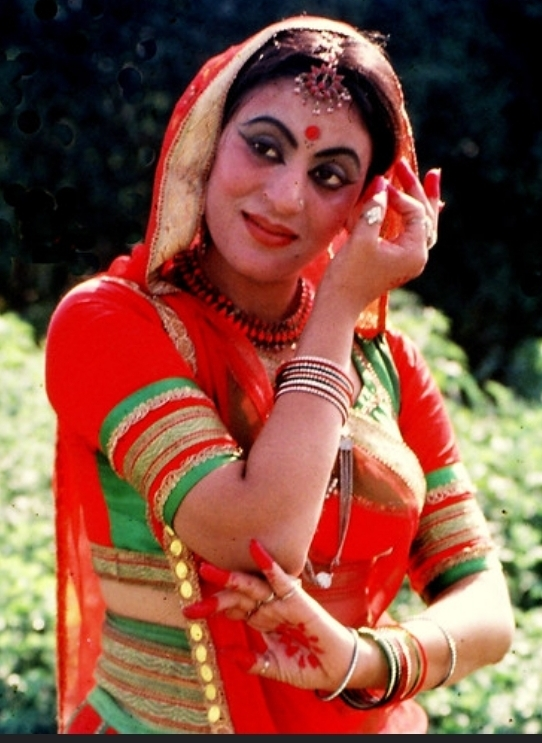

In her early years, Nupur first began her career as a Kathak dancer. She had also been taught by Birju Maharaj and Rani Karnaa, professional dancers. She received Government's National Cultural Scholarship at the age of 21. Throughout her career, she would sometimes be credited as "Alka Noopur", "Alka Napoor" (in Mr. X) and "Alka Kapoor" (in Yaadon Ki Kasam).

She made her first appearance in films with Ek Aur Suhagan in 1979, and then went to make guest appearances in films such as Chashme Buddoor (1 minute's appearance). In 1981, she made an uncredited appearance dancing in Laawaris for "Apni To Jaise Taise." She gained fame for her dancing as the song and movie were hits. In 1982, her debut in the first "Brij Bhasha" movie (Chiefly a Hindi Dialect of the Northern UP i.e. Agra, Mathura, Vrindavan, Aligarh region) film, became the pioneer in North Indian regional blockbuster Her starring role in Brij Bhoomi as the leading lady "Radha". She also launched in this film as a co-producer and co-distributor in Uttar Pradesh and other parts of India. She launched this film making it first Brij-bhasha regional mega hit movie. And she helped make it tax free by the then U.P. Chief minister Shri V.P. Singh in 1980s.

Following this,2nd innings, she went back to Bollywood and starred in many other films such as Purana Mandir and John Jani Janardhan with Actors like Shatrughan Sinha, Mohnish Behl,

She made more guest and side appearances in films like Zakhmi Sher, and also starred as Chitkari in Pataal Bhairavi.

In 1988, she starred in a major role as Amina Bai in Mohabbat Ke Dushman. She had produced & directed and starred in the main role of Chintamani the court dancer in Chintamani Surdas.

In the final years of her Bollywood career, she was cast in Jaadugar, and appeared in Mil Gayee Manzil Mujhe as Sonia, which was her last film before she retired from the film industry in the 1990s to pursue teaching and research initiatives in Kathak Classical Dance school in Gurgaon.

Her major professional association was with the music director, lyricist and singer Ravindra Jain. Both of them belonged to same Home Town Aligarh. Together they did 6 films:- Brijbhoomi, Mr. X, Mhara Peehar Sasra, Harishchandra Shaibya. And in Jai Karauli Maa & Chintamani Surdas, also as a Producer & Director debut.

Presently, she is married to Mr.Behl and runs Noopur Centre of Performing Arts in Gurgaon which is affiliated to IGNOU where CPABN(Certificate of Performing Arts-Bharatnatyam) and CPAKT(Certificate of Performing Arts-Kathak) courses are taught. She lives in Delhi. She was awarded 'Braj Ratn' award in 2016.

== Filmography ==
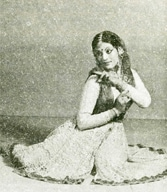
Alka Nupur in 1970s

Year	Film	Role	Notes
1979	Ek Aur Suhagan		Credited as Alka Nupoor
1981	Chashme Budoor		
1981	Laawaris	Guest Dancer in "Apni To Jaise Taise"	Uncredited
1982	Brij Bhoomi	Radha	Lead role
1984	Purana Mandir	Bijli	
1984	John Jani Janardhan	Asha/Cheryl	
1984	Zakhmi Sher		
1984	Harishchandra Shaibya	Menaka	Bengali Film
1985	Pataal Bhairavi	Chitkari Nalini	Double Role
1985	Jaago	Nurse Mary	
1985	Yaadon Ki Kasam	Khanna Office Receptionist	Credited as Alka Kapoor
1985	Paathar		
1986	Jwala		Music by Jagjit Singh
1985	Durgaa		Credited as Alka Nupoor
1985	Mahara Pihar Sasra	Soni	Haryanvi film
1986	Zindagani		Guest Dancer in "pyar ka hoon mein diwanwa"
1986	Swarthi		
1987	Mr. X	Credited as Alka Napoor	Special Appearance in song "Parda Gazab Dhaye Parda"
1988	Jai Karoli Maa	Mangala	Lead role
1988	Mohabbat Ke Dushman	Amina	
1988	Chintamani Surdas	Chintamani	Lead role
1989	Jaadugar		
1989	Mil Gayee Manzil Mujhe	Sonia	
