= John Jani Janardhan (1984 film) =

- Directed by: T. Rama Rao
- Written by: Dr. Rahi Masoom Reza (dialogue)
- Based on: Moondru Mugam (Tamil) by Peter Selvakumar
- Produced by: A. Poornachandra Rao
- Starring: Rajinikanth; Thiagarajan; Poonam Dhillon; Rati Agnihotri
- Cinematography: B. S. Loknath
- Edited by: J. Krishnaswamy; V. Balasubramaniam
- Music by: Laxmikant Pyarelal
- Production company: Lakshmi Productions
- Release date: 26 October 1984
- Country: India
- Language: Hindi

John Jani Janardhan is a 1984 Hindi film directed by T. Rama Rao. Rajinikanth played the main lead in a triple role. John being the father and Johnny and Janardhan being the two sons. It is a remake of the 1982 Tamil film Moondru Mugam, which also starred Rajinikanth. It is the only movie in Bollywood with the hero in a triple role to become a massive hit.

== Plot ==
Janardhan, one of two twin sons of the police inspector John A. Mendez, seeks to avenge his father's murder.

== Cast ==
- Rajinikanth in a triple role (Inspector John, Jani & Janardhan Gupta)
- Poonam Dhillon as Cheryl Mendes
- Rati Agnihotri as Madhu
- Utpal Dutt as Brijmohan Gupta
- Kader Khan as Gajanand
- Thiagarajan as Gopaldas
- Chandrashekhar as Madhu's dad
- Leena Das
- Dulari
- Alka Nupur
- Renu Joshi
- Vijay Kumar

== Music ==
The film's music was composed by Laxmikant–Pyarelal and lyrics by Anand Bakshi.

#	Title	Singer(s)
1	"Tu Meri Jaan Hai"	Shailendra Singh, Kavita Krishnamurti
2	"Chat Mangni Or Pat Shaadi"	S. P. Balasubrahmanyam, S. Janaki
3	"Laundiya Satra Saal Ki"	S. Janaki, S. P. Balasubrahmanyam
4	"Swamiji O Swamiji"	Shailendra Singh, S. Janaki
5	"Aye Naujawan Iss Jawani"	Shailendra Singh, S. Janaki
6	"Jab Tak Hai Jee .. Jee Bhar ke Pee"	Suresh Wadkar
