= Thanneer Thanneer =

- Theatrical poster
- Directed by: K. Balachander
- Screenplay by: K. Balachander
- Story by: Komal Swaminathan
- Produced by: P. R. Govindarajan; J. Duraisamy
- Starring: Saritha
- Cinematography: B. S. Lokanath
- Edited by: N. R. Kittu
- Music by: M. S. Viswanathan
- Production company: Kalakendra Movies
- Release date: 26 October 1981
- Running time: 143 minutes
- Country: India
- Language: Tamil

Thaneer Thaneer (transl. Water... Water...) is a 1981 Indian Tamil-language political drama film written and directed by K. Balachander, starring Saritha and M. R. Radha Ravi. The film, based on the 1980 play of the same name by Komal Swaminathan, was filmed by B. S. Lokanath and featured music by M. S. Viswanathan. It was released during the Diwali day in 1981.

Thanneer Thanneer deals with issues such as water scarcity and political corruption. Inhabitants of a drought-ridden village in Tamil Nadu, Athipati, try a cooperative method to bring water to their village, but their attempts are thwarted by unscrupulous politicians who try to use the water problem for their political gains. The film was critically acclaimed, and fetched several accolades including two National Film Awards and two Filmfare Awards South. IBN Live included the film in its list of 100 greatest Indian films of all time.

== Plot ==
When a remote village, Athipatti in Madurai district faces severe water shortages, the inhabitants adopt all possible means to bring their problem to the attention of the authorities. But the process soon reveals the apathetic attitude of politicians, bureaucrats and the press alike. A convict Vellaiswamy wanted for the murder of a local landlord turns the villagers' plight to his advantage and begins a co-operative scheme to transport water in a cart from a spring ten miles away with help of Vathiyar. The local politicians try to make people of village to vote for them in election. But all people of the village boycott the elections. The local politician beats the convict and breaks the vehicle used for transporting water. The villagers decide to build canal by themselves. But Alagiri, husband of Sevanthi, comes to the village and finds the convict hidden in the village.

The convict promises to Alagiri that he will surrender after the canal is finished. But fate intervenes in the form of a Public Works Department Officer, who stops villagers from finishing the canal work. The villagers are shot by police. The convict dies due to thirst for water. A villager joins the naxalites. Vathiyar is arrested for aiding the convict. The villagers leave the town. But Sevanthi watches the sky every evening in hope of rain. These incidents are narrated by a press reporter who had come to the village. The final scene mocks bureaucracy by showing pictures of government sponsored meetings for water resource improvement. It shows all the political parties' flags in the farmland. It shows that bureaucracy and politics fail the common man's aspirations.

== Cast ==
- Saritha as Sevanthi
- A. K. Veerasamy as a villager
- M. R. Radha Ravi as Alagiri
- Guhan as Vellaisamy
- R. K. Raman as a teacher
- Babumohan as a press reporter

== Themes ==
Thaneer Thaneer is a film about administration negligence of suffering villagers, excessive bureaucratic regulation (red tape), greed, power and powerlessness.

== Soundtrack ==
The soundtrack was composed by M. S. Viswanathan.

Track listing
No.	Title	Lyrics	Singer(s)	Length
1.	"Maanathile Meen Irukka"	Vairamuthu	Kasthuri	4:26
2.	"Megam Thiraluthadi"	Kannadasan	S. Janaki, Malaysia Vasudevan	6:42
3.	"Kannana Poo Magane"	Vairamuthu	P. Susheela	3:40
4.	"Ondrupatta Makkalundu"	Vairamuthu	M. S. Viswanathan	3:41

Telugu Track listing
No.	Title	Lyrics	Singer(s)	Length
1.	"Manasaina Maradalinee"	Sri Sri	P. Susheela
2.	"Thaayaku Bommarinta"	Sri Sri	P. Susheela
3.	"Megham Thiruguthadi"	Sri Sri	S. Janaki, S. P. Balasubrahmanyam
4.	"Kannu Nethi Kethinaavu"	Sri Sri	S. P. Balasubrahmanyam

== Reception ==
P. S. Vaidyanathan of India Today in his review praised the film citing "With his masterly touch, Balachander makes every scene throb with life – life as it is lived in the raw in India's poverty-stricken villages. Therein lies his – and the writer's – triumph. And that's what elevates the film far above the general run-of-the-mill movies and the director's own acclaimed previous efforts and converts it into a bold, thought-provoking classic." Kalki wrote, "Balachander at his best!". Saritha supposedly lost the National Film Award for Best Actress to Rekha (for Umrao Jaan) that year by a narrow margin.

== Accolades ==
Event	Category	Recipient	Ref.
National Film Awards	Best Feature Film in Tamil	Thanneer Thanneer	
National Film Awards	Best Screenplay	K. Balachander	
Filmfare Awards South	Best Film – Tamil	Thanneer Thanneer	
Filmfare Awards South	Best Director – Tamil	K. Balachander	
Cinema Express Awards	Best Film – Tamil	Thanneer Thanneer	
