= Jaago (1985 film) =

- Directed by: Chandraprakash Bhantu
- Written by: Jambuwant Rao Dhote
- Produced by: Jambuwant Rao Dhote
- Starring: Alka Nupur; Ranjeet; Asha Sachdev; Kamal Kapoor
- Music by: Jay Govin
- Release date: 1985

Jaago is a 1985 Hindi drama film directed by Chandraprakash Bhantu.

== Cast ==
- Alka Nupur
- Ranjeet
- Asha Sachdev
- Kamal Kapoor
- Jabuwantrao Dhote
- Leena Das
- Alka Noopur

== Soundtrack ==
1. "Ab To Jaago" – Anwari
2. "Ant Na Dekho Garibon Ka" – Mahendra Kapoor, Surendra Joshi
3. "Gulon Se Rang Chura Ke" – Mohammed Rafi, Kamal Sinha
4. "Main To Akela Chala" – Jaisingh, Pratibha Nature
5. "Sun Le Jahan Wale" – Govind Prasad
6. "Zindagi Hai Chaar Din Ki" – Mahendra Kapoor, Asha Bhosle
