= Kaamana Billu =

- Poster
- Directed by: Chi. Dattaraj
- Written by: Ashwini
- Screenplay by: Chi. Udaya Shankar (also wrote the dialogues)
- Based on: Mrigathrushna by Ashwini
- Produced by: J. Jayamma
- Starring: Rajkumar; Anant Nag; Saritha
- Cinematography: B. C. Gowrishankar
- Edited by: P. Bhakthavathsalam
- Music by: Upendra Kumar
- Distributed by: Padmavathi Cine Art Combines
- Release date: 26 May 1983
- Running time: 162 minutes
- Country: India
- Language: Kannada

Kaamana Billu ( transl. Rainbow) is a 1983 Indian Kannada language film directed by Chi. Dattaraj. It stars Rajkumar, Anant Nag and Saritha. The film is based on the novel Mrigathrushna by Ashwini. It was the first time that popular actor Anant Nag costarred with Rajkumar the stalwart of Kannada cinema. This climax of the movie was unique with the hero choosing to marry a specially-abled girl. Malathi Holla who would later go on to become an international para-athlete was chosen to play the role.

== Cast ==
- Rajkumar as Suryanarayana "Soori"/Soorappa
- Anant Nag as Chandra
- Saritha as Girija
- Balakrishna
- K. S. Ashwath as Seshappa
- Uma Shivakumar
- Malathi Holla
- Thoogudeepa Srinivas
- Rajanand
- M. S. Umesh
- Mysore Lokesh
- Shanthamma
- Papamma
- Shivaprakash
- Vishwanath
- Vivek Vishwakarma

== Soundtrack ==
The music of the film was composed by Upendra Kumar, with lyrics written by Chi. Udaya Shankar and Kuvempu.

Kaamana Billu

Soundtrack album to Kaamana Billu by Upendra Kumar
- Released: 1983
- Genre: Feature film soundtrack
- Length: 21:36
- Language: Kannada
- Label: Sangeetha Music

=== Track list ===
Title	Singer(s)
"Baa Mutthu Koduve Kandane"	Dr. Rajkumar
"Negila Hidida"	C. Aswath
"Kannu Kannu Kalethaga"	Dr. Rajkumar, Vani Jairam
"Indu Ananda Naa Thalalare"	Dr. Rajkumar, Vani Jairam
"Neenaadada Maathu"	S. P. Balasubrahmanyam, Sulochana
