= Meendum Parasakthi =

1985 Tamil-language film

- Title card
- Directed by: A. Jagannathan
- Screenplay by: R. K. Dharmaraj
- Story by: Raghavan Thambi
- Produced by: Siva. Ramadass; K. M. Ravi; K. Muthukumaran
- Starring: Sivakumar; Nalini
- Cinematography: P. Ganesapandian
- Edited by: V. Rajagopal
- Music by: Ilaiyaraaja
- Production company: Sridevi Bhagavathi Films
- Release date: 2 June 1985
- Country: India
- Language: Tamil

Meendum Parasakthi (transl. Parasakthi again) is a 1985 Indian Tamil-language film directed by A. Jagannathan, starring Sivakumar and Nalini. It was released on 2 June 1985.

== Cast ==
- Sivakumar as Vijay
- Nalini as Anu
- Jaishankar
- Goundamani
- Senthamarai
- Manorama
- Vadivukkarasi

== Production ==
The film was directed by A. Jagannathan and was produced by Siva Ramadas, while the film's story was written by Raghavan Thambi, the screenplay was by R. K. Dharmaraja and dialogues by Selvakumar. The film was originally titled Parasakthi, but was retitled after objections from fans of the 1952 film. Some of the scenes were shot at Ooty, and GD Naidu Palace. A fight sequence was shot at an abandoned bungalow at Chennai.

== Soundtrack ==
Soundtrack was composed by Ilaiyaraaja.

Track listing
No.	Title	Singer(s)	Length
1.	"Rajathi Roja"	S. P. Balasubrahmanyam, S. Janaki
2.	"Kaanal Neer"	S. Janaki
3.	"Kaatukulle"	Ilaiyaraaja
4.	"Sandha Kadaiya"	S. P. Sailaja, Malaysia Vasudevan

== Critical reception ==
Jayamanmadhan of Kalki wrote looking for logic in cinema is a mistake, but is it like this? and concluded don't get mislead by the title.
