= Maang Bharo Sajana =

- Theatrical release poster
- Directed by: T. Rama Rao
- Written by: Dr. Rahi Masoom Reza(dialogues)
- Screenplay by: T. Rama Rao
- Story by: M. Prabhakar Reddy
- Based on: Karthika Deepam (1979) by Lakshmi Deepak
- Produced by: A. Poornachandra Rao
- Starring: Jeetendra; Rekha; Moushumi Chatterjee; Kajal Kiran
- Cinematography: M. Kannappa
- Edited by: J. Krishnaswamy; V. Balasubramaniam
- Music by: Laxmikant-Pyarelal
- Production company: Lakshmi Productions
- Release date: 7 November 1980
- Running time: 151 minutes
- Country: India
- Language: Hindi
- Box office: ₹4.3 crore

Maang Bharo Sajana (transl. Marry Me Darling) is a 1980 Indian Hindi-language drama film, directed by T. Rama Rao, who also wrote the screenplay. The film stars Jeetendra, Rekha, Moushumi Chatterjee, Kajal Kiran and music composed by Laxmikant–Pyarelal. The film is a remake of the Telugu film Karthika Deepam (1979), which was inturn based on the 1971 Tamil film Thenum Paalum. This was one of the four films T. Rama Rao directed with Jeetendra and Rekha that explored married relationships. The film did well commercially. Rekha was applauded for her performance as the other woman.

== Plot ==
Chandu, a college student, is the son of Ram and Sita. Chandu is in a relationship with Geeta Sinha, the daughter of Doctor Sinha, and they want to marry. One day, Dr. Sinha finds Geeta and Chandu on the road while Chandu's car is punctured, and they are asking for a lift. On recognizing Chandu, he forbids Geeta from seeing him any further and, after bringing Geeta home, forbids her to leave home. Then he calls Ram (who is known to him) and tells him of the developments. He warns Ram to also forbid Chandu from seeing Geeta and not plan to marry her, or he will suffer consequences. Ram feels insulted, and when Chandu returns home, he tells him that although Dr. Sinha has rejected his marriage proposal, Ram is with him. If Chandu manages to get Geeta of her free will into his home, he will arrange their marriage. Chandu manages to reach Geeta's bedroom, and they elope to Chandu's home. When Doctor Sinha learns that Geeta has eloped, he goes to Ram's house, where the wedding takes place, and insults Chandu, calling him a “bastard” and the like. Following this, Ram confesses to an event long ago, when he went to a construction site in UP near Benaras. He decided to visit a friend in Benaras who took him to a kotha where he met Radha, a prostitute whom he rescued from her first client. Ram brought Radha to his construction site, and they became close following the incident. After they fell in love, the river Ganges flooded and separated them. Ram thought Radha died, and when he came home, his father had a heart attack. Since his father was dying, his father asked him to marry Sita. Ram Kumar married Sita and was happy for 4–5 years, and they had a son, Shaam. One day, when he went to the railway station to pick up his mother-in-law, he saw Radha on the platform. He was happy that Radha was alive and took her to his guest house, telling her that for them to get married, he needed some time to talk to his family. Ram lacked the courage to tell Sita about Radha, so he hid the relationship from her and continued the affair.

One day, on a picnic with many children and their mothers, Sita met Radha, who saved baby Shaam from drowning in the swimming pool. They became friends. One day, Ram learned that Radha became pregnant, leaving Ram in a predicament. He tries to talk to Sita but fails. Meanwhile, Sita meets Radha in a sari store, and Radha invites her to her home—Sita and Radha exchange notes about their husbands. After Radha's baby boy is born, Sita comes to Radha's home to take her for the Karva Chauth puja. Then Sita names the baby boy Chander Kumar (Chandu). After the puja, Sita takes Radha to her home to meet her husband and learns that Radha and her husband are not married due to the husband's problems. Them Ram enters, and on seeing Ram, Radha leaves the scene silently. Sita takes up Radha's case and has Ram promise to get Radha justice from her husband. Ram goes to Radha's home and finds her packing up to leave after being betrayed by Ram. He then explains the whole story to her and promises to find a solution. The baby Chandu has a fever, so Ram and Radha take him to the hospital. Sita's mother sees the two of them leaving the hospital with the baby and tells Sita that Ram is the father of Radha's baby. Sita believes her and goes to Radha's home to offer her money to get out of Ram's life, calling her a "whore". Sita also tells her that one of them must die, so if Radha is not gone by the morning, Sita will kill herself. Ram comes to Radha's home, and she tells him to go to Sita and soothe her, telling Sita that Radha is not a whore. Ram tells Sita the whole story, clarifying that he was in love with Radha before he married Sita, and he can't leave either of them since they are both his loves. He tells Sita to take a call on the situation. Sita decides to accept Radha. On reaching Radha's home, Ram and Sita find that Radha has taken poison, and Sita makes Ram fill Radha's Maang with red Sindoor from Sita's box. Radha receives a promise from Sita to bring up baby Chandu as her son. After Ram has finished telling his story, Dr. Sinha and his wife apologize to Ram and Sita for the accusations, and Chandu and Geeta get married with everyone's blessings.

== Cast ==
- Jeetendra as Ram Kumar / Chandru (double role)
- Rekha as Radha
- Moushumi Chatterjee as Sita
- Kajal Kiran as Geeta Sinha
- Om Shivpuri as Dr. Sinha
- Asrani as Jumerati
- Chandana Choudhry as Sabeeha Khan
- Yunus Parvez as Khan Sahib
- Mohan Choti as Priest
- Dheeraj Kumar as Shyam Kumar
- Parveen Paul as Sita's Mother

== Production ==
The shooting for the film was planned to start on 8 February 1980.

== Soundtrack ==
This was one of the first films for which Kavita Krishnamurthy's playback singing was retained. Anand Bakshi wrote all the lyrics.

Song	Singer
"Hum Barson Baad Mile, Yaadon Ke Phool Khile"	Kishore Kumar, Asha Bhosle
"O Mere Mehboob, Hai Yeh Jodi Khoob"	Kishore Kumar, Asha Bhosle
"Sajan Ho Sajan, Sajan Kyun Munh Pher Liya"	Kishore Kumar, Lata Mangeshkar
"Ib Na Sunoongi Maine"	Lata Mangeshkar
"Deepak Mere Suhaag Ka Jalta Rahe"	Lata Mangeshkar, Asha Bhosle
"Kisi Bazaar Se Dil Ki Khushi"	Asha Bhosle
"Kahe Ko Byahi Bides"	Kavita Krishnamurthy

== Reception ==
The film did well at the box office. Dilip Thakur of The Times of India wrote of the film's storyline being "where a hero pleases an ordinary-looking girl but leaves her for an attractive woman". The film was described as one of the successful melodramas of T. Rama Rao. According to The Indian Journal of Social Work, Maang Bharo Sajana is one of the films which "reinstate the image of a feet-worshipping, passive wife".
