= Kumara Vijayam =

- Poster
- Directed by: A. Jagannathan
- Written by: Thooyavan (dialogue)
- Based on: Perumal Satchi by Komal Swaminathan
- Produced by: E. K. Thiyagarajan; Sasikumar; V. P. Chandrasekharan
- Starring: Kamal Haasan; Jayachitra
- Cinematography: C. J. Mohan
- Edited by: K. Sankunni
- Music by: G. Devarajan
- Production company: Sree Murugalaya
- Release date: 30 July 1976
- Country: India
- Language: Tamil

Kumara Vijayam (transl. Kumar's victory) is a 1976 Indian Tamil-language comedy drama film directed by A. Jagannathan. The film stars Kamal Haasan, Jayachitra and M. G. Soman. It is based on the play Perumal Satchi by Komal Swaminathan. The film was released on 30 July 1976.

== Cast ==
- Kamal Haasan as Kumar
- Jayachitra as Nirmala
- V. K. Ramasamy as Muruganantham
- Sukumari as Parvathi
- Thengai Srinivasan as Seenu
- Suruli Rajan as Chakravarthi
- M. G. Soman as Vinoth
- Kallapetti Singaram
- Master Sekhar
- Peeli Sivam

== Production ==
The film was adapted from the Tamil stage play Perumal Satchi by Komal Swaminathan. The play was previously filmed in Malayalam as Paalazhi Madhanam (1975) by the same production company and crew.

== Soundtrack ==
The soundtrack was composed by G. Devarajan; the lyrics were written by Kannadasan, Pulamaipithan and Poovai Senguttavan.

Track listing
No.	Title	Singer(s)	Length
1.	"Ethaiyum Udaippen"	K. J. Yesudas, P. Susheela
2.	"Kanni Rasi Rasi"	K. J. Yesudas, P. Susheela
3.	"Mannar Kudi Machchan Vanthu"	P. Madhuri

== Release and reception ==
Kumara Vijayam was released on 30 July 1976. Kanthan of Kalki in his review wrote just calling it a comedy and not making the film a mere farce, adding the story gives the film a special character and concluded the film can be watched and enjoyed.
