= Poo Pootha Nandavanam =

- Directed by: B. V. Balaguru
- Screenplay by: S. A. Rajkannu
- Story by: M. S. Madhu
- Produced by: S. A. Rajkannu
- Starring: Sridhar; Saritha
- Cinematography: K. B. Dhayalan
- Edited by: T. Thirunavukarasu
- Music by: Shankar–Ganesh
- Production company: Sri Amman Creations
- Release date: 12 August 1988
- Country: India
- Language: Tamil

Poo Pootha Nandavanam (transl. The garden where flowers bloomed) is a 1988 Indian Tamil-language film directed by B. V. Balaguru and produced by S. A. Rajkannu. The film stars Sridhar and Saritha. It was released on 12 August 1988, and became a success. The film won two Tamil Nadu State Film Awards: Best Film and Best Actress (Saritha).

== Cast ==
- Sridhar
- Saritha
- K. K. Soundar
- M. S. Madhu
- V. K. Ramasamy
- Lalitha Kumari

== Soundtrack ==
The music was composed by Shankar–Ganesh with lyrics by Pulamaipithan.

Track listing
No.	Title	Singer(s)	Length
1.	"Naan Jeyichchu Kaatturen"	Malaysia Vasudevan, S. Janaki	4:01
2.	"Kanna Unakku"	S. Janaki	4:20
3.	"Enga Chinna Raja"	S. Janaki	4:40
4.	"Kanna Unakku"	S. P. Balasubrahmanyam	4:21
Total length:			17:22

== Release and reception ==
Poo Pootha Nandavanam was released on 12 August 1988. It won the Tamil Nadu State Film Awards for Best Film and Best Actress (Saritha).
