= Ponmana Selvan =

- Poster
- Directed by: P. Vasu
- Written by: P. Vasu
- Produced by: Peter Selvakumar
- Starring: Vijayakanth; Shobana; Vidhyashree
- Cinematography: M. C. Sekar
- Edited by: P. Mohan Raj
- Music by: Ilaiyaraaja
- Production company: V. N. S. Films
- Release date: 15 August 1989
- Running time: 139 minutes
- Country: India
- Language: Tamil

Ponmana Selvan (transl. The gold hearted man) is a 1989 Indian Tamil-language action drama film, directed by P. Vasu and produced by Peter Selvakumar. The film stars Vijayakanth and Shobana, with Vidhyashree, Gemini Ganesan and B. Saroja Devi in supporting roles. It was released on 15 August 1989. The film was a remake of the Kannada film Karunamayi.

== Plot ==
Ambalakarar and Meenakshi have four children – Raja, Raghu, Ravi and Radha. The family is highly respected in their home town for always standing up for justice. They successfully fight to keep alcohol from being sold in town. Meenakshi's older brother, Ammavasai, joins the family after a years-long feud but still harbours resentment. He gets the two younger brothers – Raghu and Ravi – to start drinking. Hong Kong Annamalai, the local Nataamai, has a daughter, Parvathi that's recently returned home. She falls for and pursues the clueless Raja. Marriages are arranged for both Raghu and Ravi. Parvathi manoeuvres her father and Ambalakarar into arranging her marriage with Raja as well. As the wedding talks take place, Annamalai won't permit his daughter to marry Raja as he is the adopted son of the couple. The other three are their biological children and this is the first time any of the children learn the truth. Raghu and Ravi, egged on by their uncle and Annamalai, treat Raja very poorly. At the two youngest brothers' insistence, their respective marriages take place. Kaadher Baai, Ambalakarar's closest friend, is in desperate need of money for his daughter's wedding and steals a necklace from his friend. Raja stops the theft but gets caught when returning the necklace. He takes the blame for attempted theft and gets kicked out of the home. This leaves Ammavasai with free rein and he is instrumental in the younger brothers leaving home. Raja must deal with the problems in his family while also working to establish his business and reunite with Parvathi.

== Cast ==
- Vijayakanth as Raja
- Shobana as Parvathi
- Vidhyashree as Radha
- Gemini Ganesan as Ambalakarar
- B. Saroja Devi as Meenakshi
- Goundamani as Hong Kong Annamalai
- Jaishankar as Mettupalayam Jameen
- Radha Ravi
- V. K. Ramasamy as Kadher Bhai
- S. S. Chandran as Ammavasai
- Pasi Narayanan
- Vellai Subbaiah
- Karuppu Subbiah
- Ravikiran
- Udayashankar
- Pradeep
- Vaithi
- Dr. Muthu
- Rafi
- Sindhu
- Anjana
- Srilatha
- Sanjeev Venkat as Parvathi's brother

== Production ==
The title Ponmana Selvan was suggested by the producer as he felt it reflected Vijayakanth's characteristics. An elephant from Kerala was brought for filming. Sanjeev Venkat, who later gained fame for his television roles, made his acting debut in this film.

== Soundtrack ==
The music was composed by Ilaiyaraaja. The song "Nee Pottu Vecha" attained popularity, and received renewed attention after featuring in the 2024 film Lubber Pandhu as a tribute to Vijayakanth.

Song	Singers	Lyrics	Length
"Adichen"	Mano, K. S. Chithra	Vaali	04:35
"Inimelum"	Malaysia Vasudevan, Uma Ramanan	Gangai Amaran	04:30
"Kana Karunguyile"	Mano, K. S. Chithra	Gangai Amaran	04:28
"Nee Pottu Vacha"	Malaysia Vasudevan, Mano, K. S. Chithra	Gangai Amaran	04:26
"Poovana"	Mano, Vani Jayaram	Gangai Amaran	04:38
"Thoppile Irunthaalum"	Malaysia Vasudevan	Ilaiyaraaja	04:33
