= Sowbhagya Lakshmi =

- Directed by: H. R. Bhargava
- Written by: M. Prabhakar Reddy
- Screenplay by: H. R. Bhargava
- Produced by: S P Rajashekar
- Starring: Vishnuvardhan; Lakshmi; Radha; Aruna
- Cinematography: D. V. Rajaram
- Edited by: Krishnaswamy; Balu
- Music by: S. P. Balasubrahmanyam
- Production company: Vasu Chithra
- Release date: 28 January 1987
- Country: India
- Language: Kannada

Sowbhagya Lakshmi is a 1987 Indian Kannada-language film, directed by H. R. Bhargava and produced by S. P. Rajashekar. The film stars Vishnuvardhan, Lakshmi, Radha and Aruna. The film has musical score by S. P. Balasubrahmanyam. The film was a remake of the Telugu film Karthika Deepam, which was inturn based on the 1971 Tamil film Thenum Paalum.

== Plot ==
On his wedding day, Chandru learns the shocking news that Sowbhagya is not his biological mother. This sudden revelation brings the wedding festivities to a complete halt and forces his father, Shyam, to recount his hidden past. Shyam eventually reveals the truth about Chandru's biological mother, Lakshmi, and explains the difficult circumstances and personal reasons why Chandru came to be raised by Sowbhagya as her own son from a young age.

During the course of the film, Sowbhagya and Lakshmi unknowingly become very close friends through various life events. They develop a deep emotional bond and support one another, yet they remain completely oblivious to the fact that they both share a significant past connection to the same man, Shyam. This accidental and sincere friendship creates a layer of heavy irony, as the two women find solace in each other while the secret of their shared history remains hidden just beneath the surface.

This friendship adds immense emotional complexity to the central conflict when the truth finally comes to light for everyone involved. The revelation tests the strength of their relationship and threatens the future stability of the entire family. The film focuses on the high values of personal sacrifice and forgiveness, showing how the characters must navigate their pain to preserve their bonds.

== Cast ==
- Vishnuvardhan as Shyam and Chandru in dual role
- Lakshmi as Sowbhagya
- Radha as Lakshmi
- Aruna as Geetha
- Ramesh Bhat as Gundurao
- Umashree as Sundari, Gundurao's wife
- Ravishankar
- Thimmayya
- Bank Chandrashekar
- Shivaram in Guest Appearance
- Shivaprakash
- Master Amith
- Dayanand
- Sathyabhama
- Sowbhagya
- Sundaramma
- Mysore Sharada
- Shilpa
- Sarvamangala
- Sapna
- Seema
- Devikarani

== Soundtrack ==
Sowbhagya Lakshmi

Film score by S. P. Balasubrahmanyam
- Genre: Feature film soundtrack

The music was composed by S. P. Balasubrahmanyam.

No.	Song	Singers	Lyrics
1	"Innu Innu Noduvase"	S. P. Balasubrahmanyam, S. P. Sailaja	Chi. Udayashankar
2	"Priya Priya Vinodave"	S. P. Balasubrahmanyam, Vani Jairam	Chi. Udayashankar
3	"Innellu Neenu Hogalaare"	S. P. Balasubrahmanyam, Vani Jairam	Chi. Udayashankar
4	"Hosa Kanasu Chiguri Manadali"	S. P. Balasubrahmanyam, S. P. Sailaja	Chi. Udayashankar
5	"Baalalli Jyothiyu"	Vani Jairam, S. P. Sailaja	Chi. Udayashankar
6	"Baalalli Jyothiyu"	Vani Jairam	Chi. Udayashankar
