= Kokilamma =

- Theatrical release poster
- Directed by: K. Balachander
- Starring: Saritha
- Cinematography: B. S. Lokanath
- Music by: M. S. Viswanathan
- Release date: 1 January 1983
- Running time: 127 minutes
- Country: India
- Language: Telugu

Kokilamma is a 1983 Indian Telugu-language film directed by K. Balachander. The title role of Kokilamma is played by Saritha.

The film won two Nandi Awards.

== Cast ==
- Saritha as Kokilamma
- Rajeev
- Jeeva
- Swapna
- Krishna Chaitanya
- Chaganti Venkata Rao
- K. K. Sharma
- Satti Babu
- Srinivasa
- Subba Rao

== Soundtrack ==
The lyrics were penned by Acharya Aatreya and music score provided by M. S. Viswanathan.

Track title	Singer(s)
"Evvaro Paadaru"	S. P. Balasubrahmanyam
"Komma Meeda"	P. Susheela
"Neelo Valapula"	S. P. Balasubrahmanyam, P. Susheela
"Pallavinchava"	S. P. Balasubrahmanyam
"Madhuram"	P. B. Srinivas, S. P. Balasubrahmanyam
Pothene	P.Susheela

== Awards ==
Nandi Awards

- Best Screenplay Writer - K. Balachander
- Special Jury Award - Saritha
