= Moondru Mugam =

1982 film by A. Jagannathan

- Theatrical release poster
- Directed by: A. Jagannathan
- Screenplay by: Kanaga Shanmugan; P. L. Sundar Rajan; Thamizhazhagan; Radha Veerannan
- Story by: Peter Selvakumar
- Produced by: Thamizhazhagan; G. Thyagarajan
- Starring: Rajinikanth; Radikaa
- Cinematography: Viswam Natarajan
- Edited by: K. R. Krishnan
- Music by: Shankar–Ganesh
- Production company: Sathya Movies
- Release date: 1 October 1982
- Running time: 134 minutes
- Country: India
- Language: Tamil

Moondru Mugam (transl. Three Faces) is a 1982 Indian Tamil-language action film directed by A. Jagannathan. The film stars Rajinikanth in three distinct roles. It was released on 1 October 1982 and became a major success, running for over 200 days in theatres. Rajinikanth won the Tamil Nadu State Film Award Special Prize for Best Actor. The film was remade in Kannada as Gedda Maga (1983), in Telugu as Mugguru Monagallu (1983), and in Hindi as John Jani Janardhan (1984) with Rajinikanth reprising his roles.

== Plot ==
Arun, the son of wealthy businessman Ramanathan, returns to India after spending 10 years in the United States – but as a saint. Shocked by his transformation, Ramanathan enlists Rekha, a press reporter, to help change him back to his former self. Rekha first arranges an interview, which Arun deliberately disrupts. Undeterred, she devises another plan under the pretense of taking him to a temple.

On the way, Rekha fakes a car breakdown. As Arun wanders around, he encounters a crying child and offers a chocolate. Suddenly, he is swarmed by other children and villagers, who accuse him of being a child-kidnapper. Taking advantage of the situation, Rekha cuts off Arun’s beard – a symbol of his piety. After orchestrating a few more incidents, Arun renounces his sainthood.

Returning to work, Arun grows curious about why his father has been sending money to a woman named Sagaya Mary for over 20 years. Meanwhile, Sagaya Mary learns that someone has proposed to her nephew, John. When questioned about John's parentage, she recounts the story of her brother, Alex Pandian – John's father.

A flashback reveals Alex’s past. As a fearless and just police officer, Alex frequently clashes with local mob boss Egambaram. Their conflict escalates, and Egambaram ultimately stabs Alex fatally. With his dying breath, Alex vows to return and avenge his death. His wife dies soon after giving birth to twins. At the same hospital, Ramanathan’s wife loses her child – as she had during her previous pregnancies. Sagaya Mary entrusts one of Alex's sons to Ramanathan, who raises him as Arun, while she raises the other twin, John.

On his 25th birthday, Arun seemingly experiences a divine epiphany, and claims he is the reincarnation of Alex. He agrees to meet a woman named Asha at a hotel, but it turns out to be a trap. In the ensuing struggle, he kills his attacker and is arrested. During the court hearing, a man claiming to be Alex Pandian appears, saying he had been in Sri Lanka all along. This "Alex" is, in fact, John – unknowingly working with Egambaram, the man who murdered their father.

Later, Arun confesses to the police that he fabricated the reincarnation story to lure the killers out. John eventually learns the truth about Alex Pandian and his brother Arun. Determined to save him, John confronts Egambaram but is mortally wounded. In his final act, John kills Egambaram and disposes of his body in the sea, before succumbing to his own injuries. The film concludes with Arun and Rekha, now married, paying John their respects.

== Cast ==
- Rajinikanth as SP Alex Pandian IPS, Arun and John
- Radhika as Rekha
- Sathyaraj as Dhadi
- Senthamarai as Egambaram
- Thengai Srinivasan as Ramanathan
- Silk Smitha as Asha
- Rajyalakshmi as Sheela
- Kamala Kamesh as Sagaya Mary
- Sangili Murugan as Gopal
- V. Gopalakrishnan as Commissioner of police
- Poornam Viswanathan as Judge
- Delhi Ganesh as Seeni
- C. R. Parthiban as D.I.G
- Charuhasan as Acharya swamiji (Guest Appearance)
- Ennatha Kannaiya as Arun's uncle
- Gandhimathi as Gajalakshmi
- Loose Mohan as Drunker
- Idichapuli Selvaraj as Drunker
- Haja Sheriff as Mani

== Production ==
Moondru Mugam was directed by A. Jagannathan and produced by V. Thamizhazhagan and G. Thyagarajan of Sathya Movies. It is the first film where Rajinikanth played three distinct roles. For the role of Alex Pandian, he wore a wig and sported dentures.

== Soundtrack ==
The soundtrack was composed by Shankar–Ganesh with lyrics written by Vaali, Muthulingam and Vairamuthu.

Track listing
No.	Title	Singer(s)	Length
1.	"Devamrutham"	S. P. Balasubrahmanyam, Vani Jairam	5:23
2.	"Aasaiulla Roshakara"	Vani Jairam	3:53
3.	"Naan Seitha Kurumbu"	S. P. Balasubrahmanyam	4:26
4.	"Yethanaiyo"	Malaysia Vasudevan, S. Janaki	4:56
Total length:			18:38

== Release and reception ==
Moondru Mugam was released on 1 October 1982. Kalki wrote that portraying the titular three characters differently was an achievement not only for Rajinikanth, but the director too. Rajinikanth won the Tamil Nadu State Film Award Special Prize for Best Actor.

== Legacy ==
Alex Pandian became one of the most memorable characters in the career of Rajinikanth. The popularity of the character's name inspired the Tamil dubbed version of the Telugu film Mugguru Monagallu (1994) to take on its name, as well as a 2013 film of same name. Chinni Jayanth and Vadivelu's character Telex Pandian from Pattukottai Periyappa (1994) and Ennamma Kannu (2000), respectively, as well as Imman Annachi's character from Puthiyathor Ulagam Seivom (2014) and a character from the Malaysian film Ops Kossa Dappa (2004) were named after Alex. Shiva (Sethu) is introduced in Kanna Laddu Thinna Aasaiya (2013) as a police officer named R. Alexpandian in a baniyan advertisement. The title Moondru Mugam inspired two unrelated series: one on Polimer TV and another on Zee Tamil. The makers of the 2017 Tamil film Mersal were sued by Five Star Kathiresan, a film producer who held the remake rights to Moondru Mugam, for allegedly plagiarising the film.

== Bibliography ==
- Ramachandran, Naman (2014) [2012]. Rajinikanth: The Definitive Biography. New Delhi: Penguin Books. ISBN 978-0-14-342111-5.
