= Keralida Simha =

1981 film by Chi Dattaraj

- Theatrical Poster
- Directed by: Chi Dattaraj
- Screenplay by: M. D. Sundar
- Story by: M. D. Sundar
- Produced by: P. H. Ramarao
- Starring: Rajkumar; Saritha; Thoogudeepa Srinivas
- Cinematography: R. Madhusudan
- Edited by: P. Bhaktavatsalam
- Music by: Satyam
- Production company: Sri Rajarajeshwari Film Combines
- Release date: 4 December 1981
- Running time: 164 Minutes
- Country: India
- Language: Kannada

Keralida Simha ( transl. Angry Lion) is a 1981 Indian Kannada-language film directed by Chi Dattaraj. The film stars Rajkumar, Saritha, Thoogudeepa Srinivas, Pandari Bai and Srinivasa Murthy. The movie was produced by P. H. Ramarao in the banner of Sri Rajarajeshwari Film combines. The movie was recorded a Blockbuster at the box office and had a theatrical run of over 100 days in multiple centres.

A day before the release, the prints of the movie got stuck in Chennai and the producer had no option other than scrapping the movie. However, Parvathamma Rajkumar stepped in at the end moment and arranged for personal transportation for the rolls to be distributed to the district centres in Karnataka and saw to that the movie released smoothly. This incident proved her mettle in the industry as a distributor and her ability to sail through the crisis. Director Ravi Srivatsa had claimed that Parvathamma had revealed to him that when the censor certification was deliberately being delayed, she had released the first show without censor certificate.

== Plot ==
Shankar and Sridhar are cops brought up by a single mother. Shankar is in love with Advocate Usha. Shankar arrests a gangster Sunil in an illegal drug case. While Usha bails him out citing nervous breakdown Shankar finds out that the accused is having a good time at the hospital and is the son of a gangster. This irks Shankar, and he cuts off all ties with Usha. Unknown to Shankar, the kingpin of the local drug mafia, has kidnapped Usha's mother and is forcing Usha to protect him in court.

Shankar's straightforwardness brings him in clash with his younger brother Sridhar as well. Shankar ends up getting suspended, arrested, black-labelled and even loses their mother. The rest of the story deals with how Shankar ends up beating the drug mafia.

== Cast ==
- Rajkumar as Inspector Shankar
- Saritha as Advocate Usha
- Srinivasa Murthy as Inspector Sridhar, Shankar's brother
- Pandari Bai, Shankar and Sridhar's mother
- Thoogudeepa Srinivas
- Shakti Prasad
- Honnavalli Krishna as nurse Krishna
- Sudheer
- Shani_Mahadevappa as Jagapathi

== Soundtrack ==
Satyam composed the movie songs while Chi. Udayashankar worked as the lyricist.

Keralida Simha

Soundtrack album by Satyam
- Released: 1981
- Genre: Feature film soundtrack
- Length: 19:45
- Language: Kannada
- Label: Sangeetha Music

Track #	Song	Singer(s)	Lyrics
1	"Ondu Maathu Nanage Gotthu"	Rajkumar, Sulochana	Chi. Udayashankar
2	"Amma Neenu Namagaagi"	Rajkumar, P. B. Sreenivas	Chi. Udayashankar
3	"Thiliyade Nanage Thiliyade"	Rajkumar	Chi. Udayashankar
4	"Eno Moha Eko Daaha"	Rajkumar, Vani Jairam	Chi. Udayashankar

== Release ==
The film received a U Certificate from the Chennai regional office of the censor board without any cuts.

Due to the prints being blocked in Chennai, there remained uncertainty over the film's release. Eventually, the film had a low-profile release without much marketing irrespective of which the film turned out to be a blockbuster and completed over 17 weeks of theatrical run in 11 centers across Karnataka.

== Awards ==
- Filmfare Award for Best Actor (1981) – Rajkumar
- Karnataka State Film Award for Best Sound Recording (1981) – Seetharam

== External Source ==
- Keralida Simha at IMDb
- Keralida Simha on YouTube
