= Watchman Vadivel =

- Theatrical release poster
- Directed by: A. Jagannathan
- Written by: Aaroor Dass (dialogues)
- Story by: Dasari Narayana Rao
- Based on: Surigaadu (Telugu)
- Produced by: Raadhika Reddy
- Starring: Sivakumar; Sujatha; Anand Babu; Kasthuri
- Cinematography: Babu
- Edited by: P. Sai Suresh
- Music by: Deva
- Production company: Shri Arkay Film Makers
- Release date: 22 July 1994
- Country: India
- Language: Tamil

Watchman Vadivel is a 1994 Indian Tamil-language drama film, directed by A. Jagannathan. The film stars Sivakumar, Sujatha, Anand Babu and Kasthuri. It is a remake of the Telugu film Surigaadu.

== Plot ==
Vadivel works as a watchman in a club. His wife Saro is a housewife. Both are doting parents to their only son, Raja who is a college student. What the couple does not know is that their son is someone who dreams of living a rich life and has no qualms about lying. He lies to his house owner who also has a mechanic shed that he would marry his daughter in due course and takes a different car everyday to college.

In college, he makes everyone believe that he is rich and his parents are NRI. He dates Radha, daughter of a millionaire, based on the lie. They eventually get married without him even inviting his parents. Radha relents when she finds out the truth but takes it in her stride as she too was greedy for the wealth and status which makes her unqualified to judge him. She, however, decides to respect her in-laws.

With a change of heart, Raja and Radha invite Vadivel and Saro to live with them. They too concede so that they can be with their son and grandson eventually. However, Raja and his father-in-law, gradually transform the couple to watchman and cook of the house getting rid of their servants. In due course, they get insulted and leave the house. They are in for a shock when they find that their house and the land has been taken over by Raja who has built an apartment their and sold the same. The whole change of heart was a ruse. Meanwhile, Saro has developed heart disease and needs treatment.

With all avenues closed, Vadivel sues Raja for him to payback all the money he took from them saying that since Raja never ever declared that Vadivel is his father in presence of anyone, he cannot claim that the money came as a duty of a parent. If Raja were to claim the parentage, he needs to do his duty of saving his mother's life. The judge understands the situation, makes him pay for the same with the threat of going to prison. Saro's life is saved but they both shun Raja and Vadivel returns to work vowing to trust and care about only himself and his wife.

== Cast ==
- Sivakumar as Vadivel
- Sujatha as Saro
- Anand Babu as Raja Manickam
- Kasthuri as Radha
- S. S. Chandran
- Vadivelu
- Vivek
- LIC Narasimhan
- Jai Ganesh
- Delhi Ganesh
- A. R. Srinivasan
- Oru Viral Krishna Rao
- Thillai Rajan
- Bayilvan Ranganathan

== Production ==
This was Sivakumar's 175th film as an actor.

== Soundtrack ==
The soundtrack was composed by Deva. Lyrics were written by Vaali.

Song	Singers	Length
"Chandiranum Sooriyanum"	S. P. Balasubrahmanyam, K. S. Chithra	04:37
"Kannathil Kannam" (Originally composed by Ilaiyaraaja)	S. P. Balasubrahmanyam, K. S. Chithra	04:43
"Naattula Ulla"	S. P. Balasubrahmanyam	05:31
"Un Chinna"	S. P. Balasubrahmanyam, K. S. Chithra	04:41
"Vaaram Thethi"	S. P. Balasubrahmanyam, K. S. Chithra	04:51

== Reception ==
Watchman Vadivel was released on 22 July 1994. K. Vijiyan of New Straits Times wrote, "Parents with ungrateful or troublesome children will love this movie".
