= Agni Sakshi (1982 film) =

- Theatrical release poster
- Directed by: K. Balachander
- Written by: K. Balachander
- Produced by: Rajam Balachander
- Starring: Sivakumar; Saritha
- Cinematography: B. S. Lokanath
- Edited by: N. R. Kittu
- Music by: M. S. Viswanathan
- Production company: Kavithalayaa Productions
- Release date: 14 November 1982
- Running time: 153 minutes
- Country: India
- Language: Tamil

Agni Sakshi (transl. With Fire as Witness) is a 1982 Indian Tamil-language psychological drama film directed by K. Balachander, starring Sivakumar and Saritha. It revolves around a woman with schizophrenia who has difficulty differentiating fiction from reality.

Agni Sakshi was released on 14 November 1982, and failed commercially. However, it won the Tamil Nadu State Film Award for Second Best Film and Saritha won the Tamil Nadu State Film Award for Best Actress.

== Plot ==
Kannamma is an innocent and brilliant woman with classical music and Tamil literacy knowledge as she loves Bharathiyar poems. She has obsessional psychosis, which makes her aggressive whenever she encounters any abuse to women and children. Aravindan runs a dance school and one of the students Anandhi is in love with him - which he doesn't reciprocate.

In one of the Aravindan's show, Kannamma is impressed with his ideology and performance and she expresses her fangirl moment to Aravindan. She frequently shares her poems with Aravindan through letters. Eventually they fall in love and Aravindan expresses his interest to Kannamma's parents. They hide her abnormal behavior from Aravindan and happily accept the proposal. On the other hand, Aravindan's parents are from wealthy family initially and hesitate to accept Kannamma but accept her later after Aravindan's persuasion.

Aravindan's rude mother Sivakami and Kannamma frequently get into fights because of her abnormal behavior. Aravindan is frustrated by both his mother's and Kannamma's behavior. Kannamma gets extremely violent in one such occasion and threatens to kill Sivakami. Aravindan takes Kannamma to a psychiatrist, who says she will get better if people treat her affectionately. Aravindan also inquires her parents about her and learns about her mental history. Left with no choice, Aravindan agrees to divorce her, but drops that plan after he learns that she is pregnant. Upset at this, his parents decide to move to a different home.

Kannamma's thinks she will deliver a girl child, and she hints wanting to kill her fetus to avoid her daughter being abused by the society. Per the psychiatrist's suggestion, Aravindan takes Kannamma on a vacation. They meet Kannamma's childhood friend Thilagam during the trip, who reveals some hints about Kannamma's troubled past.

Thilagam explains Kannama was exposed to Thilagam's drunken father's abusive behavior towards his wife. When Thilagam's mother was pregnant with second child, her father accused her that the child was fathered by someone else. After the delivery of the baby, Thilagam father beats his wife and kills the new born baby by throwing towards the running train, which was witnessed by Kannama and Thilagam. Kannama was mentally affected very badly after this incident.

Aravindan informs the psychiatrist about Kannamma's past, and he suggests convincing Kannama that the baby who was killed by her friend's dad is reentering the world as Kannama's child. She seems to accept this theory and continues with the pregnancy. She meets her ailing mother in law during a hospital visit, who blames Kannamma for her separating her from her own son. Kannamma is extremely disturbed hearing this.

Ultimately, Kannamma dies during childbirth and doctors are unable to diagnose any medical reason for her death. They say it appears as if she did not want to bother Aravindan anymore. Aravindan grieves Kannamma's loss with tries to live for his child.

== Cast ==
- Sivakumar as Aravindhan
- Saritha as Kannamma
- Swapna as Anandhi
- Poornam Viswanathan as Aravindan's father
- Charuhasan as the psychologist
- K. S. Jayalakshmi
- Sivakami as Aravindhan's mother

Guest appearances

- Rajinikanth as himself
- Kamal Haasan as himself
- Latha Rajinikanth as herself
- Seema as herself

== Production ==
The script of Agni Sakshi was originally planned with Kamal Haasan but later changed into female oriented, with Sivakumar and Saritha cast.

== Soundtrack ==
The music was composed by M. S. Viswanathan, with lyrics by Vaali.

Song	Singers
"Aam Bharathi Thamizhukku"	Saritha
"Aarambam Adhikarathin"	M. S. Viswanathan, Vani Jairam, L. R. Eswari
"Adiye Kannamma"	P. Susheela
"Kana Kaanum"	S. P. Balasubrahmanyam, Saritha
"Unnai Enakku"	S. P. Balasubrahmanyam
"Vanakkam Mudhal"	S. P. Balasubrahmanyam, P. Susheela

== Release and reception ==
Agni Sakshi was released on 14 November 1982, on Diwali day. Balumani of Anna praised the acting of Sivakumar and Saritha and dialogues. He felt it was saddening that Balachander who speaks about independent women choose to portray his female protagonist as a hysterical patient and also noted whether this film will be well received by common audience is a huge question but it will be well received by class audience. The film failed commercially. However, it won the Tamil Nadu State Film Award for Second Best Film, and Saritha won the Tamil Nadu State Film Award for Best Actress.
