= Anal Kaatru =

- Title card
- Directed by: Komal Swaminathan
- Written by: Komal Swaminathan
- Based on: Swarga Bhoomi by Komal Swaminathan
- Produced by: G. Ramamurthy
- Starring: Rajesh; Delhi Ganesh; Vanitha
- Cinematography: M. Kesavan
- Edited by: C. R. Shanmugam
- Music by: Shankar–Ganesh
- Production company: Cine Friends
- Release date: 25 March 1983
- Country: India
- Language: Tamil

Anal Kaatru (transl. Hot air) is a 1983 Indian Tamil-language film written and directed by Komal Swaminathan. It is based on Swaminathan's play Swarga Bhoomi (transl. Heaven on Earth). The film stars Rajesh and Vanitha Krishnachandran. It was released on 25 March 1983.

== Cast ==
- Rajesh
- Delhi Ganesh
- Vanitha
- G. Srinivasan
- Babumohan
- Omakuchi Narasimhan

== Production ==
Anal Kaatru is based on the play Swarga Bhoomi. Komal Swaminathan, who wrote the play, returned to direct the film adaptation.

== Soundtrack ==
The music was composed by Shankar–Ganesh, with lyrics by Ilaiyabharathi.

Track listing
| No. | Title | Singer(s) | Length |
|---|---|---|---|
| 1. | "Pudhu Ugaham" | T. M. Soundararajan |
| 2. | "Ponn Udhaya" | Vani Jairam, Chandrasekara Chandilyan |

== Release and reception ==
Anal Kaatru was released on 25 March 1983. Thiraignani of Kalki said the film was not hot air as the title suggests, but cold air. Balumani of Anna praised the acting, direction, dialogues and lyrics.
