= Raagangal Maaruvathillai =

- Poster
- Directed by: Sirumugai Ravi
- Produced by: C. Kalavathi; K. Revathi
- Starring: Prabhu; Ambika
- Music by: Ilaiyaraaja
- Production company: Vasan Productions
- Release date: 23 September 1983
- Country: India
- Language: Tamil

Raagangal Maaruvathillai (transl. Symphonies don't change) is a 1983 Indian Tamil-language film directed by Sirumugai Ravi. The film stars Prabhu and Ambika. It was released on 23 September 1983.

== Cast ==
- Prabhu
- Ambika

== Production ==
This was the debut production of Kalarajan and Sokkalingam under Vasan Productions. The film was launched at Prasad Studios.

== Soundtrack ==
The soundtrack was composed by Ilaiyaraaja. The song "Vizhigal Meeno" is set in Kalyani raga.

Track listing
No.	Title	Lyrics	Singer(s)	Length
1.	"Vaan Meedhiley"	Gangai Amaran	S. Janaki	4:45
2.	"Hey Alangaari"	Vairamuthu	Malaysia Vasudevan, S. P. Sailaja	5:16
3.	"Naalellaam Nalla Naalu"	Avinashi Mani	S. P. Sailaja, S. P. Balasubrahmanyam	4:09
4.	"Enn Kaathal Devi Nee Ennil Paathi"	Gangai Amaran	S. P. Balasubrahmanyam	4:34
5.	"Vizhigal Meeno Mozhigal Theyno"	Vairamuthu	S. P. Balasubrahmanyam	4:56
6.	"Thendralo Theeyo"	M. G. Vallabhan	S. P. Balasubrahmanyam	4:41
Total length:				28:21

== Reception ==
Kalki appreciated the music, but criticised the story. The film did not do well at the box-office; despite this, Prabhu named it one of his favourite films.
