= Peter Selvakumar =

Indian director, screenwriter

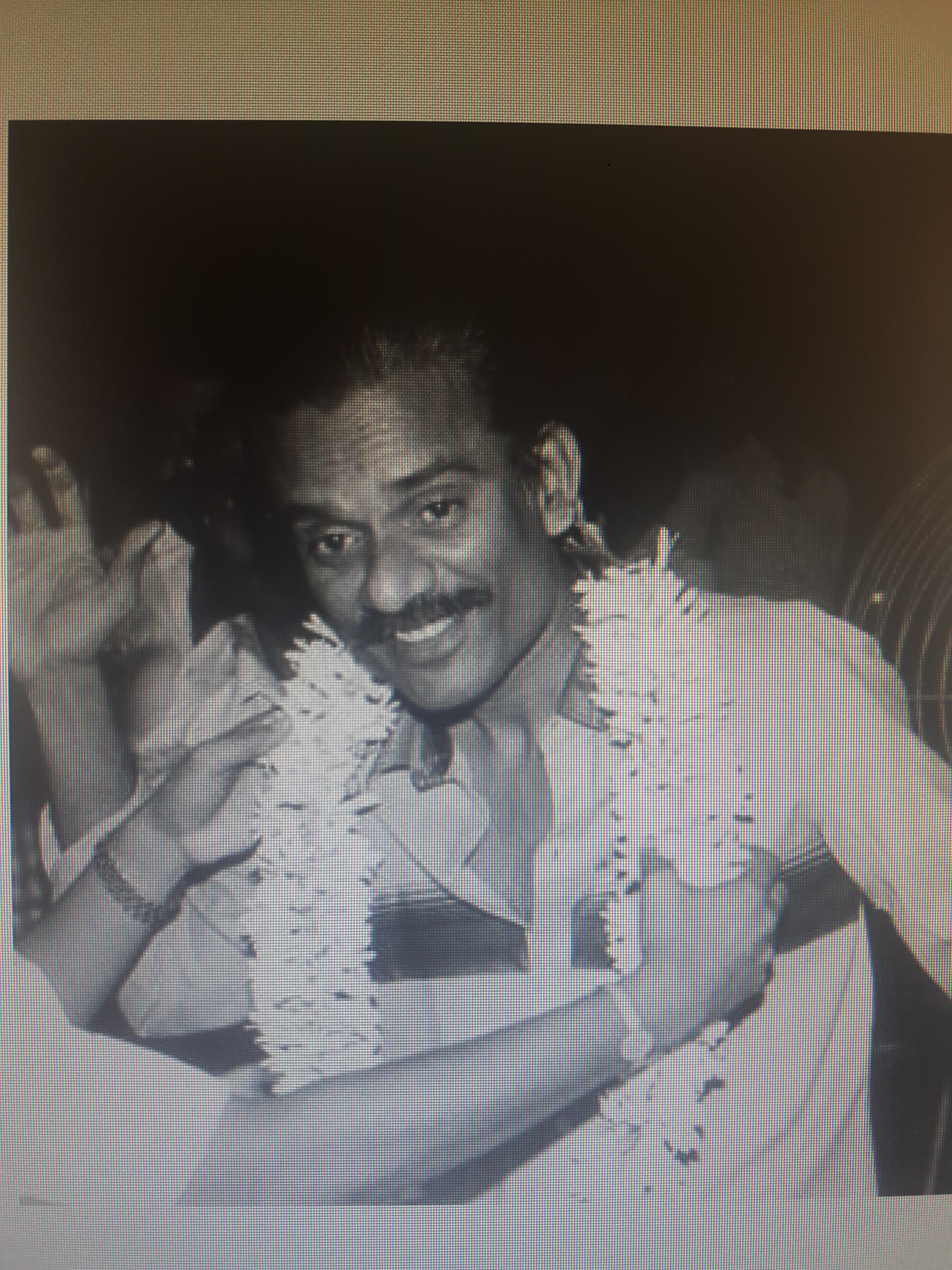
- Born: Peter Selvakumar; Tiruppathur Ramanathapuram District
- Died: 1 July 2006 (aged 66); Chennai
- Other name: Chellappa
- Occupation: Film producer
- Years active: 1980-2005
- Known for: Script writing
- Notable work: Moondru Mugam; Sivappu Sooriyan; Dharma Yuddham

Peter Selvakumar was a Tamil director, producer and story writer.

== Filmography ==
=== Film writer ===
- Sandhippu
- Sivappu Sooriyan
- Moondru Mugam
- Dharma Yuddham
- Erimalai
- Gramatthu Minnal
- Kaali Koil Kabali
- Kairasikkaran
- Pudhiya Vazhkai
- Kanne Radha
- Silk Silk Silk

=== Film producer ===
- Amman Koil Kizhakale
- Ninaive Oru Sangeetham
- Ponmana Selvan
- Dhayam Onnu (also director)

=== Television writer ===
- Mangai
- Sondham
- Vazhkai
- Vazhnthu Kaatugiren
- Sorgam
- Aasai

== Awards and recognition ==
Selvakumar was posthumously awarded a Life Time Achievement award from AVM productions.
