= Sandhippu =

- Theatrical release poster
- Directed by: C. V. Rajendran
- Screenplay by: Peter Selvakumar
- Story by: Kader Khan; Prayag Raj; K.K. Shukla
- Produced by: Santhi Narayanasamy
- Starring: Sivaji Ganesan; Radha; Sridevi; Prabhu
- Cinematography: G. Or. Nathan
- Edited by: B. Kandhasamy
- Music by: M. S. Viswanathan
- Production company: Sivaji Productions
- Release date: 16 June 1983
- Country: India
- Language: Tamil

Sandhippu (transl. Rendezvous) is a 1983 Indian Tamil-language masala film, directed by C. V. Rajendran and written by Peter Selvakumar. The film stars Sivaji Ganesan, Sridevi, Sujatha, M. N. Nambiar and Prabhu. It is a remake of the 1981 Hindi film Naseeb. The film ran for over 175 days in theatres, becoming a silver jubilee hit.

== Plot ==
Ramanathan, the trustee of the town temple, and Muthayya, the dharmagatha, are highly respected figures in their community. Their families share a close bond.

Rajavelu, who works for Ramanathan, uses his position as a cover to scout the temple and plot to steal its jewellery. With his partner Vedagiri, Rajavelu drugs Ramanathan, murders Muthayya, and robs the temple. When Ramanathan discovers their crime, they threaten his family, forcing him to sign a false confession before brutally assaulting him. The police, convinced of Ramanathan’s guilt, arrest him. Outraged, the townspeople drive Ramanathan’s wife, Lakshmi, and their sons, Raja and Vijay, out of town. The family is separated in the aftermath.

Years later, Raja works as a club waiter and part-time boxer to support Vijay’s college education. Lakshmi, now an adoptive mother, raises Geetha, a singer who performs at the same club as Raja. Vijay falls in love with his classmate Chithra, unaware that she is Muthayya’s daughter. Meanwhile, Raja and Geetha develop feelings for each other, but Prem – Vedagiri’s son and the club’s new co-owner – also pursues Geetha.

Rajavelu and Vedagiri have grown wealthy and now serve a mysterious and powerful criminal known as Don. When Rajavelu visits the club, Raja recognizes him and begins to investigate. His pursuit leads him to Don, who, to Raja’s shock, turns out to be his long-lost father, Ramanathan.

Raja also reconnects with his childhood friend Vasanth, Rajavelu’s son and another co-owner of the club. As the situation grows more complex, Vasanth falls in love with Geetha, further complicating the love triangle.

Raja unravels the tangled web of relationships, reunites his scattered family, and brings Rajavelu, Vedagiri, and the criminals to justice.

== Cast ==
- Sivaji Ganesan as Ramanathan and Raja
- Sujatha as Lakshmi
- Prabhu as Vijay
- Sridevi as Geetha
- Radha as Chitra
- Major Sundarrajan as Rajavelu
- M. N. Nambiar as Vedagiri
- Sathyaraj as Dany
- Sarath Babu as Vasanth
- R. N. Sudarshan as Don
- Manorama as Town Saroja
- Vijayakumar as Prem
- Vadivukkarasi as Thangu
- Delhi Ganesh as Muthayya
- Gandhimathi as Warden Philomina
- Vennira Aadai Moorthy as Principal
- Master Haja Sheriff as Saroja Assistant
- Loose Mohan as Writer Mani

== Soundtrack ==
The music was composed by M. S. Viswanathan, with lyrics by Vaali.

Song	Singers
"Raathiri Nilavil"	Vani Jairam
"Adi Naan Vangi Vandaenadi"	S. P. Balasubrahmanyam, S. Janaki
"Vaarthtai Naanadi Kannamma"	T. M. Soundararajan, Vani Jairam
"Ithu Aanandham Vilaiyaadum Veedu"	T. M. Soundararajan, P. Susheela
"Sollappur Raja Sollappur Rani"	T. M. Soundararajan, Malaysia Vasudevan, P. Susheela, S. P. Sailaja
"Mangalyam Thavazhum"	T. M. Soundararajan
"Unnai Than Kumbitten"	T. M. Soundararajan, S. P. Balasubrahmanyam

== Reception ==
Jayamanmadhan of Kalki wrote Rajendran makes us feel as we watch the film in fatigue wondering if it is for 18 reels and we are surprised that the film ends too quickly.
