= Sivappu Sooriyan =

- Poster
- Directed by: Muktha Srinivasan
- Written by: Peter Selvakumar
- Produced by: Muktha V. Ramaswamy
- Starring: Rajinikanth; Saritha; Radha
- Cinematography: M. Karnan
- Edited by: V. P. Krishnan; R. Shanmugam
- Music by: M. S. Viswanathan
- Production company: Muktha Films
- Release date: 27 May 1983
- Running time: 139 minutes
- Country: India
- Language: Tamil

Sivappu Sooriyan (transl. Red Sun) is a 1983 Indian Tamil-language action film directed by Muktha Srinivasan, starring Rajinikanth, Radha and Saritha. The film, released on 27 May 1983, was a box office failure.

== Plot ==
Vijay, a merchant navy officer, comes home on leave to meet his sister Selvi and her husband Vishwanthan but finds them missing. In his search for them, he bumps into Chitra who falls in love with him. With Chitra's help, Vijay is able to find Selvi, who has lost the ability to speak and her husband has vanished. Unable to make Selvi speak but determined to resolve her troubles, Vijay with the help of his friend Vidyasagar discovers that Vishwanathan had testified in court against a dangerous criminal and is being held hostage by his associates. Vijay decides to disguise himself as a smuggler and gets into the underworld. Whether he is able to retrieve Vishwanathan and bring normalcy to Selvi's life forms the rest of the story.

== Cast ==
- Rajinikanth as Vijay
- Radha as Chitra
- Saritha as Selvi
- R. N. Sudarshan as Babu
- Sangili Murugan as Rammohan
- Y. G. Mahendran as Vidhyasagar
- Manorama as Kamalam
- Silk Smitha as Rani
- Radha Ravi as Ravi
- Delhi Ganesh as Vishwanathan
- Vennira Aadai Moorthy as Kamalam's husband
- Thengai Srinivasan as Chithra's father
- V. Gopalakrishnan as Jail Superintendent
- S. R. Sivakami as Chithra's aunt
- Sivachandran as Siva
- LIC Narasimhan as Butcher
- Typist Gopu as Waiter
- Ennatha Kannaiya
- Oru Viral Krishna Rao
- Usilai Mani as Manager
- S. Ramarao
- S. V. Shanmugam Pillai
- M. R. Sulochana

== Soundtrack ==
The music was composed by M. S. Viswanathan, with lyrics by Vaali.

Song	Singers	Length
"Naan Kanda Kanda"	S. P. Sailaja	04:23
"Adi Munthanai Pandhada"	Malaysia Vasudevan, Vani Jairam	03:58
"Thangachi Sirithalae"	Malaysia Vasudevan	04:10
"Mr. Miranda Ethiri Varanda"	S. P. Balasubrahmanyam, S. Janaki	03:58

== Reception ==
Jayamanmadhan of Kalki panned the film.
