= Oru Indhiya Kanavu =

- Title card
- Directed by: Komal Swaminathan
- Written by: Komal Swaminathan
- Based on: Oru Indhiya Kanavu by Komal Swaminathan
- Produced by: T. P. Varadarajan; Vijayalakshmi Desikan
- Starring: Lalitha; Rajeev; Suhasini
- Cinematography: M. Kesavan
- Edited by: C. R. Shanmugam
- Music by: M. S. Viswanathan
- Production company: Sri Muthiyalamman Creations
- Release date: 30 September 1983
- Running time: 141 minutes
- Country: India
- Language: Tamil

Oru Indhiya Kanavu (transl. An Indian Dream) is a 1983 Indian Tamil-language film written and directed by Komal Swaminathan. It is based on his play of the same name. The film stars Rajeev, Suhasini and Lalitha, with Poornam Viswanathan in a supporting role. It was released on 30 September 1983 to widespread critical acclaim and won the National Film Award for Best Feature Film in Tamil at the 31st National Film Awards in 1984.

== Plot ==
Anamika, a postgraduate student, along with her friends visit the Javadi Hills to study the tribals who live there. During her stay, she befriends a tribal girl named Gangamma. Upon returning home, she wishes to do something to uplift the lives of the people. She is encouraged in this regard by her father, and Agni, a journalist. After a while, Anamika goes to Javadi Hills and gets to know that Gangamma is dead. She learns that Gangamma killed herself after being raped. A frustrated Anamika sets out to inquire from the local people. In the process, she is accompanied by a police officer named Muthuvel. Further inquiry reveals Gangamma was raped by Dhanapal, son of an influential minister Malaiyappar.

Anamika gathers some evidence against Dhanapal and goes to the city and approaches Agni and other journalists to publish the news. When the news get published, Malaiyappar is asked to step down by the chief minister. However, Malaiayappar refuses to resign and further blackmails the chief minister of another issue. The case against Dhanapal becomes weak and Muthuvel is transferred to another city. Anamika and her father are arrested under the National Protection Act for disturbing peace and security in the locality. Muthivel resigns from his job and joins Anamika in her struggle to seek justice for Gangamma.

== Cast ==
- Rajeev as Muthuvel
- Suhasini as Anamika
- Lalitha as Gangamma
- Poornam Viswanathan as Agni
- Vathiyar Raman as U. K. Gangatharan, also Anamika's father
- Santhanam P as Malaiyappar
- Murali C. Acharya as Dhanapal

== Production ==
Oru Indhiya Kanavu was based on the play of the same name by Komal Swaminathan himself. The communist parties screened the play in almost all parts of Tamil Nadu. At one time, it was reported to have been witnessed by over 7,000 people. The song "Odakaraiyil Puliyamaram" was shot at Vellimalai falls.

== Soundtrack ==
Soundtrack was composed by M. S. Viswanathan with lyrics by Vaali & Vairamuthu.

Track listing
No.	Title	Singer(s)	Length
1.	"En Payare Enakku"	S. P. Balasubrahmanyam, Vani Jairam
2.	"Odakkaraiyil Oru Puliya"	P. Susheela
3.	"Nalla Kaalam Parandachu"	Malaysia Vasudevan, Vani Jairam

== Release and reception ==
Oru Indhiya Kanavu was released on 30 September 1983 to widespread critical acclaim. At the 31st National Film Awards, it won the National Film Award for Best Feature Film in Tamil. The film was also screened at the Soviet Union where a reviewer "attributed the reformist nature of the film to the progressive strivings of its filmmaker". Kalki said Swaminathan took a problematic story and directed it with clarity. Balumani of Anna praised the acting, music, cinematography and praised director for giving a film for the betterment of society.

== Bibliography ==
- Dhananjayan, G. (2014). Pride of Tamil Cinema: 1931–2013. Blue Ocean Publishers. OCLC 898765509.
