= Saattai Illatha Pambaram =

- Title card
- Directed by: Erode N. Murugesh
- Written by: Vaali (dialogues)
- Screenplay by: K. Bhagyaraj
- Story by: K. Bhagyaraj
- Produced by: Sulur Kalaipithan
- Starring: Sivakumar; Saritha
- Cinematography: B. Ganesa Pandian; B. Kalaichelvan
- Edited by: Erode N. Murugesh
- Music by: Ilaiyaraaja
- Production company: Punitha Cine Arts
- Release date: 14 April 1983
- Country: India
- Language: Tamil

Saattai Illatha Pambaram (transl. A pambaram with no string) is a 1983 Indian Tamil-language film directed and edited by Erode N. Murugesh. The film stars Sivakumar and Saritha. It was released on 14 April 1983.

== Cast ==
- Sivakumar as Palanisamy
- Saritha as Jaya
- Cho Ramaswamy as Dharmalingam
- Sangili Murugan as Muthu
- Gandhimathi as pettikadai seller
- Ayyakannu as Manager

== Soundtrack ==
The soundtrack was composed by Ilaiyaraaja.

Song	Singers	Lyrics
Adicha Valikala	Malaysia Vasudevan	Vaali
Sothai Piruchukoduda	Malaysia Vasudevan, Gangai Amaran	Vaali
Kettaalum Kedaikkathamma	Malaysia Vasudevan, S. Janaki, Gangai Amaran	Vaali
Nenjukkul Poomanjangal	S. Janaki, Malaysia Vasudevan	Vairamuthu

== Reception ==
Jayamanmadhan of Kalki gave the film a negative review.
