= Soorapuli =

- Theatrical release poster
- Directed by: Venkat
- Screenplay by: Venkat
- Produced by: T. Raman
- Starring: Prabhu; Viji
- Cinematography: Viswam Natarajan
- Edited by: R. Bhaskar
- Music by: Gangai Amaran
- Production companies: Jai Geetha Movies (presents); Santhi Pictures
- Release date: 29 April 1983
- Country: India
- Language: Tamil

Soorapuli (transl. Valiant Tiger) is a 1983 Indian Tamil-language action film written and directed by Venkat. The film stars Prabhu and Viji, with Y. G. Mahendran, Vanitha, Radha Ravi, R. Dilip, Kallapetti Singaram, Sangili Murugan, Delhi Ganesh, Loose Mohan and Oru Viral Krishna Rao in supporting roles. It was released on 29 April 1983.

== Cast ==
- Prabhu
- Viji
- Y. G. Mahendran
- Vanitha
- Radha Ravi
- R. Dilip
- Kallapetti Singaram
- Sangili Murugan
- Delhi Ganesh
- Loose Mohan
- Oru Viral Krishna Rao
- S. Rama Rao
- T. K. S. Chandran
- Typist Gopu
- Kumarimuthu
- I. S. R.
- S. N. Parvathy

== Soundtrack ==
The music was composed by Gangai Amaran who also wrote the lyrics.

Track listing
No.	Title	Singer(s)	Length
1.	"Sonna Manasu"	Malaysia Vasudevan, Vani Jairam	4:48
2.	"Calcutta Kaali"	Malaysia Vasudevan, Deepan Chakravarthy, S. Janaki	5:26
3.	"Thaangaadhu"	Deepan Chakravarthy, S. P. Sailaja	4:17
4.	"Veerathile Soora Puli"	Malaysia Vasudevan	4:18
Total length:			18:49

== Release and reception ==
Soorapuli was released on 29 April 1983 alongside another Venkat directorial Antha Sila Naatkal. Jayamanmadhan of Kalki gave a mixed review praising Prabhu's acting, panning the dialogues and music and concluded citing in spite of being a second rated masala, it might run well as it is made depending on Prabhu.
