= Thenum Paalum =

- Theatrical release poster
- Directed by: P. Madhavan
- Written by: Aaroor Dass (dialogues)
- Screenplay by: P. Madhavan
- Story by: Srimathi
- Produced by: V. C. Subburaman
- Starring: Sivaji Ganesan; Padmini; B. Saroja Devi
- Cinematography: P. N. Sundaram
- Edited by: R. Devarajan
- Music by: M. S. Viswanathan
- Production company: Kasthuri Films
- Release date: 22 July 1971
- Running time: 132 minutes
- Country: India
- Language: Tamil

Thenum Paalum (transl. Honey and Milk) is a 1971 Indian Tamil-language romantic drama film directed by P. Madhavan. The film stars Sivaji Ganesan, Padmini and B. Saroja Devi. It was released on 22 July 1971.

The film inspired remakes in other languages such as the 1979 Telugu film Karthika Deepam, in Hindi as Maang Bharo Sajana (1980), in Tamil again as Karpoora Deepam (1985) and in Kannada as Sowbhagya Lakshmi (1987).

== Plot ==
Somanathan, a leading advocate, has four daughter's and among them Thangam is his favourite and most beloved daughter. One day on his visit to Madras to attend an important case, an unexpected event happens in Thangam's life. On the day of Somanathan's visit to Madras, businessman Ramu visits Somanathan's place and meets him. The purpose of this visit is to buy a land from Somanathan to build a factory for Ramu's new business. Somanathan introduces Thangam to Ramu and tell his daughter Thangam to guide Ramu to the land site. As per Somanathan's request Ramu stays in Somanathan's guest house next to his bungalow. The next day, both Ramu and Thangam visit the site and Thangam falls in love with Ramu in that trip and also, saves Ramu from a snake bite.

Same night, by mistake Ramu drinks alcohol which looks alike water and got boozed and drunken. With this drunken state he doesn't want to stay at Thangam's place and decided to leave the guest house. While entering the house to inform Thangam's mother about his leaving, he happened to see the only Thangam in a fully romantic. Ramu who is not in his control due the alcohol lose his control and it was accepted by Thangam as she was already in so much affection on Ramu got in physical with each other and shared the bed.

When Ramu realised his mistake, it was too late. When he was trying to escape, he was caught by Thangam's mother who was returning from temple. On her insistence to Ramu to marry Thangam, Ramu reveals that he is already married to Janaki. On Thangam's mother's repeated request and compulsion, Ramu assures that Ramu will marry Thangam only with his wife's acceptance and take Thangam with him. But Thangam's mother does not agree, so finally Ramu has to take Thangam with him to Madras and makes her stay at his office staff Balu's place until he tells his wife all what happened and make his wife to accept his situations and agrees Ramu to marry Thangam.

Now the film revolves around how Ramu manages and handles the issues arises between Janaki and Thangam. Mainly how he handles his mother-in-law aka Janaki's mother and her troublesome doubt relating to Ramu's extra marital affairs.

Meanwhile, while returning from his Madras case visit advocate Somanathan learns that his beloved daughter Thangam went to Rameswaram for a picnic (as informed by his wife (Thangam's mother) and his other daughters) and suspected to be dead in the severe storm struck in the coastal town, Rameswaram. But Somanathan is unable to accept and believe this. So he was in search of his daughter that he will find her one-day alive. In search of his daughter he finally arrives at Ramu's office and seeking his help to search his daughter just in case if she is alive. While they were speaking Ramu receives a phone call from Thangam and without revealing to Somanathan that he is talking to Thangam, Ramu tells Thangam to go back to home safe before any known people of her seeing her.

There comes a great twist (please watch the movie, otherwise it might be a spoiler to this movie). Thangam got pregnant in the meanwhile. Thangam meets a person outside the telephone booth, Who was that person and what happened to Thangam, which makes the remaining story more interesting and complicating to Ramu to handle. Finally the movie ends with a climax of all getting together.

== Cast ==
- Sivaji Ganesan as "Chife Engineer" Ramu
- Padmini as Janaki
- B. Saroja Devi as Thangam
- S. V. Ranga Rao as Advocate Somanathan
- S. N. Lakshmi as Sivakami
- M. S. Sundari Bai as Akilandam
- Nagesh as Balu
- Sachu as Abinayam
- Typist Gopu as Rathnam
- Gandhimathi as Aatha
- Shanmugasundari as Sundari
- Goundamani as Subramaniyan, Office Peon (uncredited)
- Seethalakshmi as Balu's mother
- Master Ramesh as Babu

== Soundtrack ==
The music was composed by M. S. Viswanathan. The song "Manjalum Thanthaal" attained popularity.

Song	Singers	Lyrics	Length
"Ottukketkum Pengale"	L. R. Eswari	Vaali	03:28
"Aduthavan Potta Thalathukku"	'Dharapuram' Sundarrajan, L. R. Eswari	Vaali	03:19
"Oruvanukku Oruthi"	P. Susheela	Kannadasan	03:03
"Manjalum Thanthaal"	Jikki, S. Janaki	Kannadasan	03:56
"Nadhiyinil Vellam"	T. M. Soundararajan	Kannadasan	04:05
