= A. Jagannathan =

Indian film director

- Born: Aatmik. Jagannathan; 26 November 1935; Tiruppur, Coimbatore District, Madras Presidency, British India
- Died: 7 October 2012 (aged 76); Coimbatore, Tamil Nadu, India
- Occupation: film director
- Years active: 1973-2012
- Spouse: Rajamani
- Children: Usha Devi; Pavithra Devi; Arun Kumar

A. Jagannathan (26 November 1935 – 7 October 2012) was an Indian film director who worked in the Tamil, Kannada and Hindi film industries and he was introduced by R.M. Veerappan in his Sathya Movies banner for Manipayal. He directed nearly 50 films in Tamil.

== Film career ==
He made his debut as director in Manipayal in 1973 after working as an assistant to T. Prakash Rao and P. Neelakantan for almost 15 films, most of them being MGR movies. He directed the MGR film Idhayakkani, under the tutelage of R.M.Veerappan and went on to direct five other blockbuster films for RMV's Sathya Movies including Moondru Mugam with Rajinikanth and Kadhal Parisu with Kamal Hasaan. He also directed some television serials.

He directed Sivaji Ganesan's Vellai Roja which won awards including the Filmfare Award. Another successful venture in his career was Moondru Mugam.

== Partial filmography ==
Year	Film	Language	Notes
1973	Manipayal	Tamil	
1974	Idhayam Parkiradhu	Tamil	
1975	Idhayakkani	Tamil	
1976	Kumara Vijayam	Tamil	
1976	Nalla Penmani	Tamil	
1976	Athirshtam Azhaikkirathu	Tamil	
1977	Nandha En Nila	Tamil	
1978	Ival Oru Seethai	Tamil	
1979	Jaya Nee Jayuchutte	Tamil	
1979	Mugathil Mugan Paarkalaam	Tamil	
1979	Muthal Iravu	Tamil	
1980	Aayiram Vaasal Idhayam	Tamil	
1981	Pennmanum Pesugiradhu	Tamil	
1981	Sorgathin Thirappu Vizha	Tamil	
1982	Krodham	Tamil	
1982	Moondru Mugam	Tamil	
1983	Manaivi Illatha Neram	Tamil	
1983	Thanga Magan	Tamil	
1983	Vellai Roja	Tamil	Remake of Malayalam film Postmortem; Filmfare Award for Best Director – Tamil
1984	Komberi Mookan	Tamil	
1984	Naalai Unathu Naal	Tamil	Remake of Gumnaam
1984	Oh Maane Maane	Tamil	Remake of Malayalam film Chattakari
1985	Karpoora Deepam	Tamil	
1985	Meendum Parasakthi	Tamil	
1987	Kadhal Parisu	Tamil	
1987	Muthukkal Moondru	Tamil	
1988	Dharmathma	Kannada	
1989	En Thangai	Tamil	
1991	Mill Thozhilali	Tamil	
1991	Archana IAS	Tamil	
1993	Tahqiqaat	Hindi	
1994	Watchman Vadivel	Tamil	
1994	Khaidi No. 1	Telugu	Remake of Khalnayak
1994	Hero	Tamil	Remake of Khalnayak

== Death ==
He suffered from breathing ailments and was hospitalized in Coimbatore for a fortnight. He died on 7 October 2012, and was cremated at Tiruppur. He was survived by his wife Rajamani, daughters Usha Devi and Pavithra Devi and son Arun Kumar.
