= Saritha =

Indian actress

- Born: Abhilasha; Munipalle, Andhra Pradesh, India
- Occupations: Actress; voice artist
- Years active: 1978–present
- Spouse: Mukesh (m. 1988; div. 2011)
- Children: 2
- Relatives: Viji Chandrasekhar (sister)
- Awards: Filmfare Awards; Nandi Awards; Tamil Nadu State Film Awards; Karnataka State Film Awards

Saritha is an Indian actress who has acted in more than 150 films and provided voice for many actress for more than 200 films in Tamil, Telugu, Malayalam and Kannada languages. She was one of the popular and critically acclaimed lead actresses during the 1980s.

She also appeared in a television serial, Selvi. She is also credited as a dubbing artist. She has dubbed her voice for Tamil, Kannada, Malayalam and Telugu movies for actresses like Nagma, Vijaya Shanthi, Tabu, Sushmita Sen, Ramya Krishnan and Soundarya in 1990s.

She is a recipient of several state awards from Tamil, Telugu and Kannada, six Filmfare Awards and six Nandi Awards including a Special Jury Award for the film Arjun. Saritha received Tamil Nadu State Film Awards four times, and Karnataka State Film Awards once.

== Career ==
Saritha made her acting debut through Manchiki Sthanam Ledu a movie produced by producer based in Warangal named Akula Sanjeev Kumar in 1978 with a different screen name followed by Maro Charitra, a Telugu film directed by K. Balachander. The movie dealt with cross-cultural romance, where she acted opposite Kamal Haasan as a Telugu-speaking girl. She received more offers in Tamil films and Tamil Audience accepted herself as her own, she mostly acted films directed by Balachander. Some of her films are Thappu Thalangal, Idhi Katha Kadhu, Vandichakkaram, Netrikan, Agni Sakshi, Puthukavithai, Kalyana Agathigal and Achamillai Achamillai. Her performance in Vandichakkaram (1980) and Achamillai Achamillai (1984) won her the Filmfare Best Tamil Actress awards. She also played guest roles as herself in 47 Natkal and its Telugu remake, directed by Balachander.

She acted in many popular Kannada movies with famous Kannada actor Dr. Rajkumar like Hosa Belaku, Keralida Simha, Bhakta Prahlada, Chalisuva Modagalu and Kaamana Billu. She gained critical acclaim for her performance in heroine-oriented movies like Eradu Rekhegalu and Sankranthi and the musical Malaya Marutha opposite Dr. Vishnuvardhan.

She had her head tonsured for the cancer-affected role in Sujatha in 1980 and later gained several pounds to play the psychotic role in the 2005 film Julie Ganapathi. Neither of these films were successful but won Critical acclaim. She also won a Nandi Special Jury Award for her performance as Aandaalu in the movie Arjun in 2004.

Saritha also worked as a voice actor in Kannada, Telugu and Tamil films. She has lent her voice to other actresses, including Madhavi, Soundarya, Ramya Krishnan, Nagma, Vijayashanti, Simran, Tabu, Sushmita Sen, Roja, Suhasini, Radha, Radhika and Aarthi Agarwal. She won four times the Nandi Award for Best Female Dubbing Artist for her voice to Soundarya in Ammoru, Maa Ayana Bangaram (1997) and Anthapuram (1999).

After a long break, she made her comeback as an actress through the Sivakarthikeyan-starrer film Maaveeran (2023).

== Personal life ==
Saritha was born and brought up as Abhilasha in Munipalle, Guntur District, Andhra Pradesh, India.

She was first married to Venkata subbaiah on 1975 at early age and divorced shortly .

She married Malayalam actor Mukesh on 2 September 1988 and they have two sons, Shravan and Tejas. The couple separated in 2011. Saritha now resides with Shravan (made his acting debut in the 2018 film Kalyanam) in UAE.

== Awards ==
Filmfare Awards South

- 1980 – Best Actress – Tamil - Vandichakkaram
- 1982 – Best Actress – Kannada - Hosa Belaku
- 1984 – Best Actress – Tamil - Achamillai Achamillai
- 1985 – Best Actress – Kannada - Mugila Mallige
- 1986 – Best Actress – Kannada - Mouna Geethe
- 1989 – Best Actress – Kannada - Sankranthi

Nandi Awards

- 1982 – Special Jury – Best Actress - Kokilamma
- 1995 – Best Female Dubbing Artist - Ammoru
- 1996 – Best Female Dubbing Artist - Maavichiguru
- 1997 – Best Female Dubbing Artist - Maa Ayana Bangaram
- 1998 – Best Female Dubbing Artist - Anthapuram
- 2004 – Special Jury - Arjun

Tamil Nadu State Film Awards

- Kalaimamani Award from Tamil Nadu State
- 1979 – Best Actress - Oru Vellaadu Vengaiyagiradhu
- 1982 – Best Actress - Agni Sakshi
- 1988 – Best Actress - Poo Pootha Nandavanam
- 1995 – Best Female Dubbing Artist – Amman (1995)

Karnataka State Film Awards

- 1989 – Best Actress - Sankranthi

South Indian International Movie Awards

- 2024 – SIIMA Award for Best Actress in a Supporting Role Tamil for Maaveeran

== Filmography ==
=== Tamil films ===
Year	Title	Role	Notes
1978	Thappu Thalangal	Sarasu	
1978	Aval Appadithan	Arun's Wife	
1979	Ponnu Oorukku Pudhusu	Rukmani	
1979	Chakkalathi		
1979	Nool Veli	Baby	
1980	Vandichakkaram	Vadivu	
1980	Sujatha	Sujatha	
1980	Oru Velladu Vengaiyagiradhu	Kalpana	
1980	Rusi Kanda Poonai	Savithri	
1980	Kuruvikoodu	Valli	
1980	Panam Penn Paasam		
1980	Thai Pongal		
1981	Mouna Geethangal	Suguna	
1981	Aani Ver	Arukkaani	
1981	Anjatha Nenjangal		
1981	47 Natkal	Herself	
1981	Oruthi Mattum Karaiyinile	Radha	
1981	Netrikkann	Radha	
1981	Enga Ooru Kannagi		
1981	Keezh Vaanam Sivakkum	Manju	
1981	Kalam Oru Naal Maarum		
1981	Koyil Puraa		
1981	Thanneer Thanneer	Sevanthi	
1982	Amma	Seetha	
1982	Pannaipurathu Pandavargal		
1982	Nenjil Oru Ragam	Geetha	
1982	Thai Mookambigai	Vellayamma	
1982	Nambinal Nambungal		
1982	Kanmani Poonga	Uma, Rama	
1982	Pudukavithai	Kalyani	
1982	Thunai	Vidya	
1982	Agni Sakshi	Kannamma	
1983	Imaigal	Kasthuri	
1983	Thangaikkor Geetham		
1983	Yamirukka Bayamen	Karpagam	
1983	Oru Pullangulal Adupu Othugirathu		
1983	Uyirullavarai Usha		
1983	Malaiyoor Mambattiyan		
1983	Sivappu Sooriyan	Selvi	
1983	Saattai Illatha Pambaram	Jaya	
1984	Komberi Mookan		
1984	Achamillai Achamillai	Thenmozhi	
1984	Kuzhandhai Yesu		
1984	Iru Medhaigal	Devaki	
1984	Shankari	Shankari	
1984	Uravai Kaatha Kili	Valli	
1984	Nalam Nalamariya Aaval	Thulasi	
1984	Simma Soppanam	Sudha	
1985	Kalyana Agathigal	Ammulu	
1985	Veli	Gowri	
1985	Saavi	Latha	
1985	Sugamana Raagangal	Renuka	
1985	Anni	Seetha	
1985	Kolusu	Ponnuthayi	
1985	Mel Maruvathoor Athiparasakthi		
1985	Erimalai		
1985	Ammavum Neeye Appavum Neeye	Aruna	
1986	Dharmam	Bhanu	
1986	Oomai Vizhigal	Sumathi	
1986	Kodai Mazhai	Eye Specialist	
1986	Kungumapottu		
1987	Etikku Potti		
1987	Mangai Oru Gangai		
1987	Vaazhga Valarga		
1987	Poo Poova Poothirukku		
1987	Ellaikodu		
1987	Vedham Pudhithu		
1988	Raasave Unnai Nambi		
1988	Poo Pootha Nandavanam		
2001	Friends		
2002	Album		
2003	Julie Ganapathi	Julie Ganapathi	
2006	June R		
2013	Inam		
2023	Maaveeran	Eshwari	

=== Telugu films ===
Year	Title	Role	Note
1978	Maro Charitra	Swapna	
1979	Manchiki Sthanam Ledu		
1979	Idi Katha Kaadu	Gayathri	
1979	Guppedu Manasu	Baby	
1979	Vijaya	Vijaya	
1980	Gutilo Ramachilaka		
1981	Srirasthu Subhamasthu	Devi	
1981	Athagari Pethanam		
1981	Tholi Kodi Koosindi		
1981	47 Rojulu		
1981	Rama Dandu		
1981	Aadavallu Meeku Joharlu	Papayamma	
1982	Chandamama		
1982	Kalahala Kapuram	Krishnaveni	
1983	Kokilamma	Kokilamma	
1983	Thodu Needa	Sharada	
1984	Kanchana Ganga	Kanchana	
1984	Bhagyalakshmi		
1985	Kala Rudrudu		
1985	Anuraga Bandham		
1986	Kaliyuga Pandavulu	Krishnaveni	
1987	Satyagraham		
1987	Ida Prapancham		
1988	Shivude Shankarudu	Dr. Kavitha	
2004	Arjun	Andal	

=== Malayalam films ===
Year	Title	Role	Note
1984	Oru Kochu Kadha Aarum Parayatha Kadha	Janu	
1984	Sandarbham	Dr. Indhu	
1984	Minimol Vathikkaanil	Susie	
1985	Kathodu Kathoram	Marykutty	
1985	Muhoortham 11:30	Indu	
1985	Kaattuthee		
1985	Oru Kochu Kaaryam		
1987	Kanikaanumneram	Savithri	
1987	Yaagaagni	Bhairavi	
1987	P.C. 369	Elsa Mathew	
1987	Manasa Maine Varu	Lakshmi	
1987	Thaniyavarthanam	Indu Balan	
1987	Vilambaram	Sunanda	
1988	Sangham	Ammini	
1988	Onnum Onnum Pathinonnu	Sumi	
1989	Anuragi	Rosamma	
1989	Lal Americayil	Sindhu	
1990	Kuttettan	Seetha Lakshmi	
1991	Souhrudam	Annie	
2000	Life Is Beautiful	Vice Principal	
2003	Ammakilikkoodu	Janaki	
2026	Aarambham	Avantika's mother	Filming

=== Kannada films ===
Year	Title	Role	Notes
1978	Thappida Thala	Sarasu	
1981	Keralida Simha	Lawyer	
1981	Jeevakke Jeeva	Geeta/Gayatri	Double role
1982	Hosa Belaku	Vatsala	
1982	Chalisuva Modagalu	Lawyer Leela	
1983	Kaamana Billu	Girija	
1983	Bhakta Prahlada	Queen Kayadu	
1984	Eradu Rekhegalu	Collector Janaki	
1985	Mugila Mallige	Kamala	
1985	Bramha Gantu	Muniyamma	
1986	Malaya Marutha	Sharada	
1986	Hennina Koogu		
1986	Mounageethe	Mangala/Lakki	Double role
1987	Manasa Veene		
1987	Kurukshethra	Collector Saraswati	
1988	Baalondu Bhavageethe	Suma	
1988	Sri Venkateshwara Mahime	Padma	
1989	Sankranthi		
2012	Dashamukha	Savitha	

=== Television ===
Year	Title	Role	Language	Network(s)	Ref
2005-2006	Selvi	Thamarai	Tamil	Sun TV	
2024-2025	Mahanadigai	Judge	Tamil	Zee Tamil	

=== As dubbing artist ===
Films

Dubbed for	Film
Sujatha	Gorintaku (1979)
Sujatha	Chanti (1992)
Madhavi	Haalu Jenu (1982)
Jaya Prada	47 Natkal (1981)
Suhasini	Nenjathai Killathe (1980) (Telugu Version)
Suhasini	Benkiyalli Aralida Hoovu (1983)
Suhasini	Swati (1984)
Suhasini	Sravanthi (1985)
Suhasini	Karpoora Deepam (1985)
Suhasini	Sindhu Bhairavi (1985) (Telugu Version)
Suhasini	Muddula Manavaraalu (1986)
Suhasini	Chantabbai (1986)
Suhasini	Punya Dampathulu (1987)
Suhasini	Lawyer Suhasini (1987)
Suhasini	President Gari Abbai (1987)
Suhasini	Samsaram Oka Chadarangam (1987)
Suhasini	Sister Nandini (1987)
Sudha Chandran	Mayuri (1985)
Bhanupriya	Preminchu Pelladu (1985)
Bhanupriya	Jwala (1985)
Bhanupriya	America Alludu (1985)
Bhanupriya	People's Encounter (1991)
Vijayashanti	Pattabhishekam (1985)
Vijayashanti	Muddula Krishnaiah (1986)
Vijayashanti	Jeevana Poratam (1986)
Vijayashanti	Kondaveeti Raja (1986)
Vijayashanti	Dhairyavanthudu (1986)
Vijayashanti	Padamati Sandhya Ragam (1987)
Vijayashanti	Bhanumati Gari Mogudu(1987)
Vijayashanti	Sahasa Samrat (1987)
Vijayashanti	Manchi Donga (1988)
Vijayashanti	Yuddha Bhoomi (1988)
Vijayashanti	Bhale Donga(1989)
Vijayashanti	Sathruvu (1990)
Vijayashanti	Kondaveeti Donga (1990)
Vijayashanti	Kartavyam (1990)
Vijayashanti	Lorry Driver (1990)
Vijayashanti	Surya IPS (1991)
Vijayashanti	Thalli Thandrulu (1991)
Vijayashanti	Stuartpuram Police Station (1991)
Vijayashanti	Police Lockup (1992)
Vijayashanti	Mannan (1992)
Vijayashanti	Rowdy Inspector (1992)
Vijayashanti	Mondi Mogudu Penki Pellam (1992)
Vijayashanti	Chinarayudu (1992)
Vijayashanti	Mechanic Alludu (1993)
Vijayashanti	Aashayam (1993)
Vijayashanti	Nippu Ravva (1993)
Vijayashanti	Maga Rayudu (1994)
Vijayashanti	Street Fighter (1995)
Vijayashanti	Thilagavathi CBI (1996)
Vijayashanti	Adimaipenn (1997)
Vijayashanti	Thadayam (1997)
Vijayashanti	Suryodayam (1999)
Vijayashanti	Sri Bannari Amman (2002)
Radha	Enga Chinna Raasa (1987)
Saranya	Neerajanam (1988)
Nadhiya	Bazaar Rowdy (1988)
Nadhiya	Vinta Dongalu (1990)
Nadhiya	M. Kumaran S/O Mahalakshmi (2004)
Nadhiya	Attarintiki Daredi (2013)
Nadhiya	Drushyam (2014)
Nadhiya	Bruce Lee - The Fighter (2015)
Nadhiya	A Aa (2016)
Nadhiya	Varudu Kaavalenu (2021)
Nadhiya	Drushyam 2 (2021)
Nadhiya	Sarkaru Vaari Paata (2022)
Swetha	Ontari Poratam (1989)
Jayabharathi	Varusham Padhinaaru (1989)
Shobana	Nari Nari Naduma Murari (1990)
Shobana	Neti Siddhartha (1990)
Shobana	Mitr, My Friend (Telugu) (2002)
Amala	Karpoora Mullai (1991)
Amala	Nirnayam (1991)
Amala	Vaasalil Oru Vennila (1991)
Sridevi	Ennamo Nadakuthu (1991)
Roshini	Gunaa (1991)
Madhubala	Azhagan (1991)
Madhubala	Roja (1992) (Telugu Version only)
Madhubala	Puttinilla Metinilla (1993)
Madhubala	Ganesh (1998)
Aparna	Sundarakanda (1992)
Master Manjunath	Swati Kiranam (1992)
Meenakshi Sheshadri	Aapadbandhavudu (1992)
Meenakshi Sheshadri	Duet (1994)
Nagma	Killer (1992)
Nagma	Gharana Mogudu (1992)
Nagma	Aswamedham (1992)
Nagma	Allari Alludu (1993)
Nagma	Rendilla Poojari (1993)
Nagma	Varasudu (1993)
Nagma	Kaadhalan/Premikudu (1994)
Nagma	Baashha (1995)
Nagma	Rikshavodu (1995)
Nagma	Adavi Dora (1995)
Nagma	Mounam (1995)
Nagma	Love Birds (1996)
Nagma	Surya Putrulu (1997)
Nagma	Janakiraman (1997)
Nagma	Aravindhan (1997)
Nagma	Sreekrishnapurathe Nakshathrathilakkam (1998)
Nagma	Allari Ramudu (2002)
Meena	Pellam Chepte Vinali (1992)
Meena	Bangaru Mama (1992)
Meena	Ejamaan (1993)
Meena	Muthu (1995) (Telugu Version)
Meena	Oru Oorla Oru Rajakumari (1995)
Meena	Bhamane Satyabhamane (1996)
Meena	Gillikajjalu (1998)
Meena	Sneham Kosam (1999)
Meena	Rhythm (2000) (Telugu Version)
Ramya Krishnan	Allari Mogudu (1992)
Ramya Krishnan	Bangaru Bullodu (1993)
Ramya Krishnan	Allari Priyudu (1993)
Ramya Krishnan	Hello Brother (1994)
Ramya Krishnan	Aayanaki Iddaru (1995)
Ramya Krishnan	Criminal (1995) (Telugu version only)
Ramya Krishnan	Adhirindhi Alludu (1996)
Ramya Krishnan	Aahwanam (1997)
Ramya Krishnan	Chinnabbayi (1997)
Ramya Krishnan	Ooyala(1998)
Ramya Krishnan	Deergha Sumangali Bhava (1998)
Ramya Krishnan	Aavide Shyamala (1999)
Ramya Krishnan	Narasimha (1999) (Telugu version of Padayappa)
Ramya Krishnan	Oke Maata (2000)
Ramya Krishnan	Naa Alludu (2005)
Kanchan	Prema Pusthakam (1993)
Priya Raman	Valli (1993)
Pragathi	Veetla Visheshanga (1994)
Urvashi	Adavallaku Mathrame (1994)
Vineetha	Nila (1994)
Roja	Bobbili Simham (1994)
Roja	Mee Aayana Jagratha (1998)
Roja	Kshemamga Velli Labamgarandi (2000)
Aamani	Subha Lagnam (1994)
Aamani	Maavichiguru (1996)
Ranjitha	Periya Marudhu (1994)
Soundarya	Ammoru/Amman (1995)
Soundarya	Vetagadu (1995)
Soundarya	Pavithra Bandham (1996)
Soundarya	Dongata (1997)
Soundarya	Arunachalam (1997) (Telugu)
Soundarya	Maa Aayana Bangaram (1997)
Soundarya	Antahpuram (1998)
Soundarya	Suryudu (1998)
Soundarya	Pelli Peetalu (1998)
Soundarya	Taraka Ramudu (1998)
Soundarya	Subhavaartha (1999)
Soundarya	Arundhati (1999)
Soundarya	Annayya (2000)
Soundarya	Devi Putrudu (2001)
Tabu	Kadhal Desam/Prema Desam (1996)
Tabu	Snehithiye (2000)
Urmila Matondkar	Anaganaga Oka Roju (1997)
Sushmita Sen	Ratchagan/Rakshakudu (1997)
Raasi	Gokulamlo Seetha (1997)
Raasi	Moodu Mukkalaata (2000)
Rachna Banerjee	Nenu Premisthunnanu (1998)
Rachna Banerjee	Maavidaakulu (1998)
Laila	Pavitra Prema (1998)
Heera Rajagopal	Aavida Maa Aavide (1998)
Pratyusha	Raayudu (1998)
Vasuki	Tholi Prema (1998)
Deepti Bhatnagar	Auto Driver (1998)
Sakshi Shivanand	Iddaru Mitrulu (1999)
Sakshi Shivanand	Vamsoddarakudu (2000)
Shalini	Sakhi (2000)
Priyanka Trivedi	Raa (2001)
Jyothika	Dumm Dumm Dumm (Telugu Version) (2001)
Simran	Daddy (2001)
Simran	Amrutha (2002)
Simran	Seema Simham (2002)
Devayani	Srimathi Vellostha(1998)
Arti Agarwal	Indra (2002)
Sneha	Punnagai Desam (2002)
Sneha	Vinaya Vidheya Rama (2019)
Sonali Bendre	Palnati Brahmanayudu (2003)
Khushbu	Stalin (2006)
Khushbu	Agnyaathavaasi (2018)
Sangeetha	Bahumati (2007)
Lakshmi	Pelli Kanuka (1998)
Vidya Balan	NTR: Kathanayakudu (2019)

Television

Year	Title	Role	Language
2000	KB Micro Thodargal- Kaadhal Vaangi Vanthen	Voice Artist for Thamarai (actress)	Tamil
