= Komal Swaminathan =

Tamil film director and journalist (1935–1995)

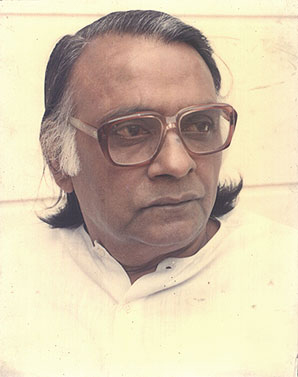
- Born: Komal Swaminathan; 27 January 1935; Komal, Thanjavur district, Tamilnadu, India
- Died: October, 1995 (age 60); Chennai, Tamilnadu, India
- Occupations: Film director; playwright; screenwriter
- Years active: 1959–1995
- Relatives: Anand Shankar (grandson)

Komal Swaminathan (born 27 January 1935 in Karaikudi, Tamil Nadu, India, died 1995) was a congressional activist in his early years, a Tamil theater personality, film director and journalist.

== Early life ==
Swaminathan joined the school of S. V. Sahasranamam and learned the art of playwriting and stage techniques. In 1971, he formed Stage Friends.

== Career ==
He was a dramatist on the Tamil stage, his Thanneer Thanneer in 1980 brought him to the limelight. He scripted, directed and staged this play with his drama troupe "Stage Friends", this play was staged more than 250 times. This play, Thanneer Thanneer (Water Water) highlighted the acute water shortage in rural areas due to bureaucracy and the apathetic attitude of politicians and bureaucrats, and was later filmed under the same name by K. Balachander in 1981, which won National Award and international acclaim.

Komal Swaminathan has staged nearly 33 plays. He also directed the film Oru Indhiya Kanavu (An Indian Dream) and received the National Film Award for Best Regional film in 1984.

He was the editor of Subhamangala -a Literary, Socio-Cultural Tamil monthly magazine. He was the recipient of Kalaimaamani and a number of other awards. Komal Swaminathan died in 1995. He had a daughter, Lalitha Dharini.

== Filmography ==
Plays

Komal has scripted and conducted the following plays with his own troupe

- Sannathi Theru, 1971
- Nawaab Narkali, 1971 (later adapted as the movie Nawaab Narkali)
- Manthiri Kumari, 1972
- Pattinam Paripogirathu, 1972
- Vaazvin Vaasal, 1973 (later adapted as a TV serial)
- Perumale Saatchi, 1974 (later adapted as the movie Kumara Vijayam)
- Jesus Varuvar, 1974
- Raja Parambarai, 1975 (later adapted as the movie Paalooti Valartha Kili)
- Yudha Kaandam, 1975 (later adapted as the movie Yudha Kaandam directed by him)
- Anju Puli Oru Penn, 1976
- Koodu Illa Kolangal, 1977 (Komal had originally named it Ilakkanam Meeriya Kavithaigal)
- Aatchi Matram, 1977
- Sultan Ekathasi, 1978
- Swarga Boomi, 1979 (later adapted as the movie Anal Kaatru directed by him)
- Chekku Maadugal,1980 (later adapted as the movie Saathikkoru Neethi)
- Thaneer Thaneer, 1980 (later adapted as the movie Thaneer Thaneer)
- Oru Inthiya Kanavu, 1982 (later adapted as the movie Oru Indhiya Kanavu directed by him)
- Asoka Vanam, 1983 (later adapted as a TV serial)
- Naliravil Petrom, 1984
- Manithan Ennum Theevu, 1985
- Irutile Thedatheenga, 1985 (later adapted as a TV serial)
- Karuppu Viyazakizamai, 1988
- Narkali, 1989 (later adapted as a TV play)
- Grama Rajyam, 1989
- Anbukku Panjamillai, 1992
- Pudhiya Paadhai
- Minnal Kolam
- Thillai Naayakam
- Doctorukku Marundhu
- Kalyaana Super Market
- Delhi Maamiyaar (later adapted as the movie Karpagam Vanthachu)
- Avan Paarthuppaan
- Appaavi
- Killiyoor Kanagam
- En Veedu En Kanavan En Kuzhanthai (later adapted as a TV play)

Screenwriter

- Kallum Kaniyagum (1968)
- Nawab Naarkali (1972)
- Paalazhi Madhanam (1975; Malayalam)
- Kumara Vijayam (1976)
- Thanneer Thanneer (1981)
- Kodai Mazhai (1986)

Director

- Oru Indhiya Kanavu (1983)
- Anal Kaatru (1983)
- Yudha Kaandam (1983)
