= Vellai Roja =

- Theatrical release poster
- Directed by: A. Jagannathan
- Screenplay by: A. L. Narayanan
- Story by: Dr. Pavithran
- Based on: Post Mortem (1982)
- Produced by: V. Viswanathan
- Starring: Sivaji Ganesan; Ambika; Prabhu; Radha
- Cinematography: P. Ganesapandiyan
- Edited by: R. Devarajan
- Music by: Ilaiyaraaja
- Production company: Filmco
- Release date: 4 November 1983
- Country: India
- Language: Tamil

Vellai Roja (transl. White Rose) is a 1983 Indian Tamil-language thriller film, directed by A. Jagannathan and written and A. L. Narayanan. The film stars Sivaji Ganesan, Ambika, Prabhu and Radha. It is a remake of the 1982 Malayalam film Post Mortem. The film was released on 4 November 1983, and ran for 100 days in 13 centres.

== Plot ==
Father James is a Catholic priest, well-respected by the entire town. Parisutham is a multimillionaire and head of the town. Peter who is the son of coffin maker Savaerimuthu is an angry young man, who always fights for justice and is against rich people. Peter's sister Mary and Parisutham's son Johnny are in love. Mary becomes pregnant and at that time Johnny has to leave the country for few days on business, so she asks Father James' help to arrange her marriage with Johnny because both Parisutham and Peter respect his words. But Peter's girlfriend Lakshmi overhears part of a conversation between James and Mary on her pregnancy and misunderstands that Father James and Mary were involved in a taboo relationship, and she tells Peter.

The next day, Mary is found hanging dead from a tree. Peter, in a fit of rage assaults Father James and gets arrested, but he escapes. Everyone thinks that Mary has committed suicide and she is buried without a postmortem. But Father James has a suspicion about Mary's death, so he asks his twin brother Arul, Superintendent of Police, to have the body exhumed to perform a postmortem. The next day when Arul exhumes Mary's coffin he finds Father James murdered and his dead body in it, with Mary's corpse missing. Everyone suspects Peter was the culprit, Arul immediately begins an investigation to solve the mystery behind Mary's missing dead body and Father James' death. Who is the culprit for Father James' murder, the motive, was Mary killed or did she commit suicide, why was her body missing and where is Johnny, forms the rest of the story.

== Cast ==
- Sivaji Ganesan as Father James and SP Arul IPS
- Prabhu as Peter Savari Muthu
- Suresh as Johnny
- Ambika as Lakshmi
- Radha as Mary Savari Muthu
- Y. G. Mahendra as Constable Perumal Naidu
- Calcutta Viswanathan as Parisutham
- Sivachandran as Chinna Durai
- Thengai Srinivasan as Rahvuthoor
- Pandari Bai as Peter and Mary's Mother
- Silk Smitha (Guest Appearance)
- Manorama as Arpudhamani Rosappoo
- Indra as Mumtaz
- Vani as Kamakshi
- G. Srinivasan as Savari Muthu
- V. Gopalakrishnan as Police Inspector
- Oru Viral Krishna Rao as Dhairiyam

== Soundtrack ==
The music was composed by Ilaiyaraaja.

Song	Singers	Lyrics	Length
"Solai Poovil Malai Thenral"	S. P. Balasubrahmanyam, S. Janaki	Muthulingam	4:38
"Oh Maanae Maanae"	S. P. Balasubrahmanyam, S. Janaki	Na. Kamarasan	4:20
"Devanin Kovil"	Malaysia Vasudevan	Vaali	4:15
"Naagoor Pakkathile"	Ilaiyaraaja, Malaysia Vasudevan, S. P. Sailaja	Gangai Amaran	4:43
"Vaadi Enn"	Gangai Amaran, S. Janaki	Gangai Amaran	4:25

== Release and reception ==
Vellai Roja was released on 4 November 1983 on the day of Diwali. Jagannathan's other film Thanga Magan was also released on the same day. Despite facing competition from other Diwali releases such as Thoongathey Thambi Thoongathey, Apoorva Sahodarigal and Thangaikkor Geetham, both films became very successful at box-office. Jayamanmadhan of Kalki appreciated Ganesan for his performance in two distinctive roles. Balumani of Anna praised the acting, humour, Ilaiyaraaja's music and Narayanan's dialogues but found Jagannathan's direction as average.
