= Thanga Magan (1983 film) =

1983 film by A. Jagannathan

- Poster
- Directed by: A. Jagannathan
- Written by: S. Jagadeesan (dialogues)
- Screenplay by: Sathya Movies Story Dept.
- Story by: Sathya Movies Story Dept.
- Produced by: V. Thamizhazhagan; G. Thyagarajan
- Starring: Rajinikanth; Poornima Jayaram
- Cinematography: Viswam Nataraj
- Edited by: K. R. Krishnan
- Music by: Ilaiyaraaja
- Production company: Sathya Movies
- Release date: 4 November 1983
- Running time: 140 minutes
- Country: India
- Language: Tamil

Thanga Magan (transl. Golden son) is a 1983 Indian Tamil-language action film directed by A. Jagannathan, starring Rajinikanth and Poornima Jayaram. The film was released on 4 November 1983 and became a success.

== Plot ==
Arun is the haughty and belligerent son of rich parents Chidambaram and Annapoorani. Arun runs into constant tiffs with a pretty but combative hotel dancer, Chitra and eventually they both fall in love. One night, when a hit man Kali, sent by his rivals attempts to murder Arun in his house and Chidambaram seems to recognise the hitman and lets him escape, Arun confronts his father to know the truth. Chidambaram reveals to Arun that he is not his real son and years ago he and Kali had been deputed to kill the infant Arun and his mother by Arun's own father. But the kind-hearted Chidambaram had decided to adopt and raise Arun as his son.

In another twist, Arun finds out that his real mother is Laxmi, an abandoned woman who had been living in Chitra's house. Arun is distraught when Chidambaram's version of the events of yore raise questions and doubts about a reticent Laxmi's past and morality. Laxmi later reveals to all how she had been deceived to lie in court of being immoral and later ordered to be killed by her criminal husband Velliangiri as a part of his nefarious designs to save his associate Rajalingam. Velliangiri and Rajalingam who had in fact sent Kali to eliminate Arun, now aim to kill Laxmi as well when they learn she is alive. Once the truth about her witness statement is known in the case of the murder, Laxmi is arrested. While Arun tries to bail her out, Chidambaram is forced to take her from jail due to the threat to Annapoorani's life. Laxmi is then captured by Velliangiri and is tied up in his bungalow. Arun enters the bungalow as Reddy garu for the sake of espionage and to inform the police of Laxmi's whereabouts. Arun battles to protect his mother and bring his criminal father and Rajalingam to justice in the rest of the story.

== Cast ==
- Rajinikanth as Arun
- Poornima Jayaram as Chithra
- Jaishankar as Rajalingam
- Thengai Srinivasan as Velliangiri
- Silk Smitha as Rekha
- Raveendran as Ravi (Delhi Ganesh as Ravi's voiceover)
- C. R. Vijayakumari as Laxmi
- Manorama as Annapoorani
- V. K. Ramasamy as Chidambaram
- V. Gopalakrishnan as Captain Raghuram
- R. S. Manohar as Kali
- C. R. Parthiban as Police Commissioner
- Poornam Viswanathan as Judge
- Neelu
- Loose Mohan
- Gundu Kalyanam
- Thayir Vadai Desigan
- Anuradha (Special appearance in Machaana Paaradi)

== Soundtrack ==
The music was composed by Ilaiyaraaja. The song "Vaa Vaa Pakkam Vaa" was recomposed by Anirudh Ravichander as "Coolie Disco" for the 2025 film Coolie also starring Rajinikanth.

Song	Singer(s)	Lyrics	Length
"Adukku Malligai"	S. P. Balasubrahmanyam, S. Janaki	Na. Kamarasan	4:15
"Machaana Paaradi"	S. Janaki, Vani Jairam	Vairamuthu	4:28
"Poomaalai"	S. P. Balasubrahmanyam, S. Janaki	Vaali	6:13
"Raathiriyil Poothirukum"	S. P. Balasubrahmanyam, S. Janaki	Pulamaipithan	4:07
"Vaa Vaa Pakkam Vaa"	S. P. Balasubrahmanyam, Vani Jairam	Muthulingam	5:02

== Release and reception ==
Thanga Magan was released on 4 November 1983 on the day of Diwali. Jagannathan's other film Vellai Roja was also released on the same day. Despite facing competition from other Diwali releases such as Thoongathey Thambi Thoongathey, Apoorva Sahodarigal and Thangaikkor Geetham, both the films by Jagannathan became very successful. Jayamanmadhan of Kalki felt Manohar was better among the list of antagonists who are otherwise funny while also praising the music, sets, stunts, flashback and scenes of Rajinikanth in Reddiar's look. Balumani of Anna praised acting, Ilaiyaraaja's music, Natraj's cinematography and Jagannathan's direction.

== Legacy ==
The song "Vaa Vaa Pakkam Vaa" was used in the teaser of another Rajinikanth film titled Coolie.
