= K. J. Yesudas Tamil discography =

K. J. Yesudas discography
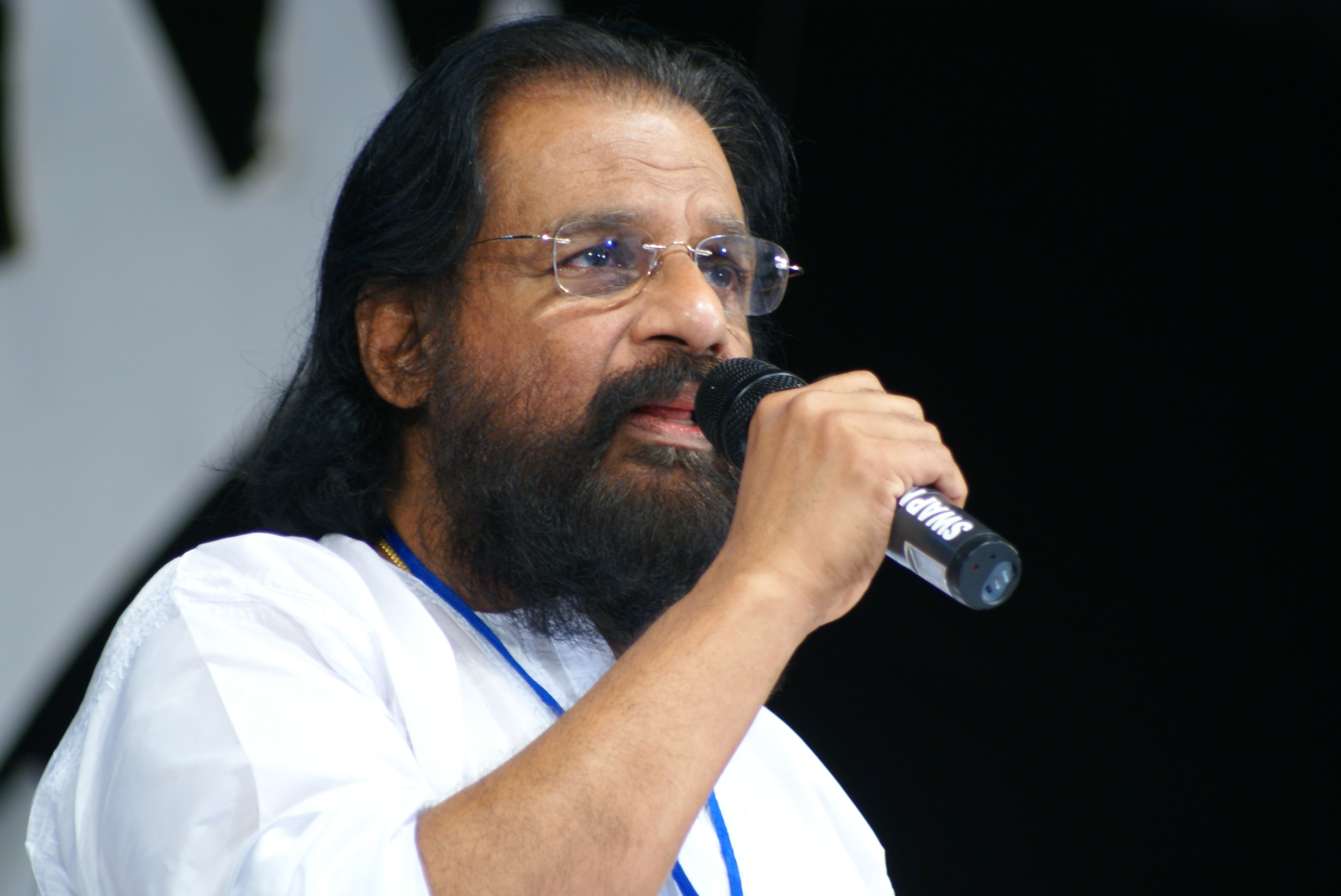
- Yesudas during a live concert in 2010

This is the Tamil discography of veteran Indian male playback singer K. J. Yesudas, who sang in over 700 songs in Tamil films. Yesudas's first film was in the film Bommai (1963) as Neeyum Bommai Naanum Bommai composed by S. Balachander.

He gave his voice to actors and thespians in the Tamil Film Industry such as M. G. Ramachandran, Sivaji Ganesan, R. Muthuraman, Gemini Ganesan, Jaishankar, Sivakumar, Ravichandran, Nagesh, Chandrababu, and A. V. M. Rajan. He also gave his voice to many new generation actors like Rajinikanth, Kamal Haasan, Vijayakanth, Vijayakumar, K. Bhagyaraj, Mohan, Karthik, Sathyaraj, Sudhakar, Prabhu, Pratap K. Pothen, Mammootty, Ramarajan, Thiagarajan, Rahman, Rajesh, Sarathkumar, Murali, Nagarjuna, Arjun, Aravind Swamy, Ajith Kumar, Vikram, Vijay, Prashanth, and Vignesh in addition to various other known and unknown heroes and supporting actors like R. S. Manohar, Jai Ganesh, Thengai Srinivasan, Raghuvaran, Prakash Raj, Radha Ravi, Ramesh Aravind, Jayaram, Nizhalgal Ravi, Pandiyan, Charan Raj, Sarath Babu, Sayaji Shinde, Vineeth, and Siva Chandran.

== Collaboration ==
=== Music composers ===
Major music directors worked with him S. Balachander, Vedha, M. S. Viswanathan, T. K. Ramamoorthy, Shankar–Ganesh, S. V. Ramanan, R. Govardhanam, G. Devarajan, V. Dakshinamoorthy, R. Parthasarathy, Salil Chowdhury, Vedpaul Sharma, M. B. Sreenivasan, V. Kumar, Vijaya Bhaskar, K. V. Mahadevan, G. K. Venkatesh, Ilaiyaraaja, S. Rajeswara Rao, Chandrabose, L. Vaidyanathan, Kunnakudi Vaidyanathan, Gangai Amaran, Shyam, S. D. Sekhar, Lakshmikanth Piyarilaal, Bappi Lahiri, Vijaya T. Rajendar, V. S. Narasimhan, Raveendran, K. Bhagyaraj, Maragadha Mani, Murari, S. P. Balasubrahmanyam, Adhithan, Manoj–Gyan, Gyan Varma, Manoj Saran, Deva, A. R. Rahman, M. M. Keeravani, S. A. Rajkumar, Vidyasagar, Karthik Raja, Yuvan Shankar Raja, Srikanth Deva, V. Thooyvan, Sabesh–Murali, Bhagavathi Srinivasan, Dhina, Ishaan Dev, Natarajan Sankaran, Bhavatharini, D. Imman, Anirudh Ravichandran, Soundaryan, Sirpy, Anand Shankar, Devendran, Sampath Siva, Devadevan, Johnson, Saivannan, Philip Jerry and Hamsalekha.

=== Playback singers ===
He has sung with other male singers such as M. S. Viswanathan, T. M. Soundararajan, Sirkazhi Govindarajan, Saibaba, S. P. Balasubrahmanyam, Ilaiyaraaja, Malaysia Vasudevan, P. Jayachandran, S. N. Surendar, Arunmozhi, Balesh, Kalyan, Vijay Yesudas, Ranjith, Yuvanshankar Raja, Murali and Dhina

He also sang duets with many female playback singers such as Soolamangalam Rajalakshmi, M. S. Rajeswari, P. Suseela, B. Vasantha, L. R. Eswari, S. Janaki, P. Madhuri, B. S. Sasirekha, T. K. Kala, Vani Jayaram, Swarnalatha, Jency Anthony, S. P. Sailaja, Uma Ramanan, Shoba Chandrasekhar, Manjula, G. K. Vidhya, K. S. Chithra, Sujatha Mohan, Minmini, Sadhana Sargam, Anuradha Sriram, Madhushree, Vanitha, Saindhavi, Rita, Asha Latha, Sujatha Radhakrishnan, and Sunatha.

He sang duets with singing actors such as Vanisri, Vijaya T. Rajendar and Shruthi Haasan.

== Awards ==
=== Honours and Major Awards ===
- Honorary Doctorate by Annamalai University, Tamil Nadu in 1989
- Kalaimamani Award by Government of Tamil Nadu.

=== Tamil Nadu State Film Awards ===
State Film Awards 5 times for the Best Male Playback by the Government of Tamil Nadu.

Year	Film	Category	Outcome	Ref
1977	Andaman Kadhali; Madhuraiyai Meetta Sundharapandiyan	Best Male Playback	Won	
1982	Moondram Pirai	Best Male Playback	Won	
1988	Multiple Films	Best Male Playback	Won	
1989	Nyaya Tharasu	Best Male Playback	Won	
1992	Mannan	Best Male Playback	Won	

== List of Tamil film discography ==
=== 1960s ===
Year	Movie	Song	Music	Lyrics	Co - Singer
1963	Konjum Kumari	Aasai Vandha Pinne	Vedha	Vaali	B. Vasantha
1964	Bommai	Neeyum Bommai Naanum Bommai	S. Balachander	K. Neelamegam	-
1964	Kaadhalikka Neramillai	Enna Paarvai Unthan	Viswanathan–Ramamoorthy	Kannadasan	P. Suseela
1964	Kaadhalikka Neramillai	Nenjathail Alli Konjum	Viswanathan–Ramamoorthy	Kannadasan	P. Suseela, L. R. Eswari
1964	Veeranganai	Neela Vanna Kangalirandu	Vedha		P. Suseela
1964	Veeranganai	Idi Idikkuthu Kaatraikkuthu	Vedha		-
1965	Panam Tharum Parisu	Paruvam Mutti Pazhagum	Shankar–Ganesh		S. Janaki
1966	Namma Veettu Lakshmi	Alangaram Kalaiyaamal	M. S. Viswanathan	Kannadasan	L. R. Eswari
1966	Parakkum Paavai	Sugam Yethile Idhayathila	M. S. Viswanathan		T. M. Soundararajan, L. R. Eswari
1966	Yaarukkaga Azhuthaan	Uruvathile Ivan	S. V. Ramanan		-
1966	Marakka Mudiyumaa?	Vasantha Kaalam Varumo (humming)	T. K. Ramamoorthy		P. Suseela
1969	Porchilai	Sri Mahaganapathin	R. Govardhanam		-
1969	Thulabaram	Katrinile	G. Devarajan		-

==== 1970 ====
Film	Song	Composer(s)	Writer(s)	Co-artist(s)
Jeeva Naadi	Aruvi Magal	V. Dakshinamoorthy		Soolamangalam Rajalakshmi
Kalyana Oorvalam	Koondhalile Nei Thadavi	R. Parthasarathy		S. Janaki

|-

==== 1971 ====
Film	Song	Composer(s)	Writer(s)	Co-artist(s)
Annai Velankanni	Thandhana Thaana	G. Devarajan		Madhuri
Annai Velankanni	Vaanamenum Vedhiyile	G. Devarajan		Madhuri
Deivam Pesumaa	Pani Nilave Siru Malare	Shankar–Ganesh		-

==== 1973 ====
Film	Song	Composer(s)	Writer(s)	Co-artist(s)
Karumbu	Thingal Maalai Ven	Salil Chowdhury	Ilango Adigal	
Malai Naattu Mangai	Neelamaan Kadal Alaiyil	Vedpaul Sharma		P. Suseela
Malai Naattu Mangai	Vandhal Kaattu Poochendu	Vedpaul Sharma		S. Janaki
Ulagam Sutrum Valiban	Thanga Thoniyile	M. S. Viswanathan	Vaali	P. Suseela

==== 1974 ====
Film	Song	Composer(s)	Writer(s)	Co-artist(s)
Aval Oru Thodar Kathai	Deivam Thantha Veedu	M. S. Viswanathan	Kannadasan	-
Urimaikural	Vizhiye Kadhai Ezhudhu	M. S. Viswanathan	Kannadasan	P. Suseela

==== 1975 ====
Film	Song	Composer(s)	Writer(s)	Co-artist(s)
Apoorva Raagangal	Athisaya Raagam Aanandha	M. S. Viswanathan	Kannadasan	-
Dr. Siva	Malare Kurinji Malare	M. S. Viswanathan	Vaali	S. Janaki
Eduppaar Kai Pillai	Ponnum Mayangum	M. B. Sreenivasan		P. Suseela
Ezhaikkum Kaalam Varum	Mogam Ennum	V. Kumar		P. Suseela
Maalai Sooda Vaa	Yaarukku yaar Sondham	Vijaya Bhaskar	Vaali	
Mayangukiral Oru Maadhu	Varavendum Vaazhkkaiyil	Vijaya Bhaskar	Kannadasan	
Oru Kudumbathin Kadhai	Malai Saaralil Ilam	Salil Chowdhury		B. S. Sasirekha (humming)
Swami Ayyappan (1975 film)	Harinaarayana	G. Devarajan	Vayalar	
Swami Ayyappan (1975 film)	Harivarsanam	G. Devarajan	Kumbakudi Kulathu Iyer	
Swami Ayyappan (1975 film)	Harivarsanam (chorus)	G. Devarajan	Kumbakudi Kulathu Iyer	Chorus
Swami Ayyappan (1975 film)	Mannilum Vinnilum	G. Devarajan	Sreekumaran Thampi	Chorus
Swami Ayyappan (1975 film)	Sabari malaiyil	G. Devarajan	Vayalar	
Naalai Namadhe	Ennai Vittal Yaarumillai	M. S. Viswanathan	Vaali	-
Naalai Namadhe	Kaadhal Embathu	M. S. Viswanathan	Vaali	P. Suseela
Naalai Namadhe	Neela Nayanangalil	M. S. Viswanathan	Vaali	P. Suseela
Pallandu Vazhga	Ondre Kulam Endru	K. V. Mahadevan	Pulamaipithan	-
Pallandu Vazhga	Poi Vaa Nadhi Alaiye	K. V. Mahadevan	Na. Kamarasan	T. K. Kala
Pallandu Vazhga	Enna Sugam Enna Sugam	K. V. Mahadevan	Pulamaipithan	P. Suseela
Pallandu Vazhga	Sorgathin Thirappu Vizhaa	K. V. Mahadevan	Pulamaipithan	Vani Jayaram
Pallandu Vazhga	Ondre Kulam Endru - (reprise 1)	K. V. Mahadevan	Pulamaipithan	Chorus
Pallandu Vazhga	Ondre Kulam Endru - (Reprise 2)	K. V. Mahadevan	Pulamaipithan	Chorus
Pallandu Vazhga	Ondre Kulam Endru - (Reprise 3)	K. V. Mahadevan	Pulamaipithan	Chorus
Pallandu Vazhga	Ondre Kulam Endru - (Reprise 4)	K. V. Mahadevan	Pulamaipithan	Chorus
Thaai Veettu Seedhanam	Kaalathai Vellum	M. S. Viswanathan	Kannadasan	P. Suseela
Thangathile Vairam	En Kaadhali	Shankar–Ganesh	Vaali	S. P. Balasubrahmanyam
Thennangkeetru	Andavan Potta Pulli	G. K. Venkatesh	Kannadasan	-
Then Sindhudhe Vaanam	Unnidam Mayangugiren	V. Kumar	Vaali	-
Thottathellam Ponnagum	Pozhthhu Vidinthaal(Aadum Varaikkum)	Vijaya Bhaskar		shek mohammad kowsalya -
Uravu Solla Oruvan	Mohana Punnagai	Vijaya Bhaskar		-
Yarukkum Vetkam Ilai	Oruvarukkum Vetkamillai	G. K. Venkatesh		-
Yarukkum Vetkam Ilai	Melum Keezhum Kodugal	G. K. Venkatesh		-

==== 1976 ====
Film	Song	Composer(s)	Writer(s)	Co-artist(s)
Bhadrakali (film)	Kannan Oru Kai Kuzhanthai	Ilaiyaraaja	Vaali	P. Suseela
Dasavatharam	Ambai Eduthaan	S. Rajeswara Rao		Sirkazhi Govindarajan, Vani Jayaram
Idhaya Malar	Chendu Mallippoo Pol	M. S. Viswanathan	Pulamaipithan	Vani Jayaram
Idhaya Malar	Manthiram Sollum	M. S. Viswanathan	Pulamaipithan	Vani Jayaram
Kumara Vijayam	Kanni Raasi En	G. Devarajan		P. Suseela
Manmadha Leelai	Hello My Dear	M. S. Viswanathan	Kannadasan	L. R. Eswari
Manmadha Leelai	Manaivi Amaivathellam	M. S. Viswanathan	Kannadasan	-
Mogam Muppadhu Varusham	Enadhu Vaazhkai Paathaiyil	Vijaya Bhaskar		-
Nalla Penmani	Inangalile Enna	V. Kumar	Pulamaipithan	Swarnalatha
Needhikku Thalaivanangu	Indha Pachai Kilikkoru (Male)	M. S. Viswanathan	Pulamaipithan	-
Nee Oru Maharani	Nee Oru Maharani	Shankar–Ganesh		P. Suseela
Oorukku Uzhaippavan	Idhuthaan Mudhal Raathiri	M. S. Viswanathan	Vaali	Vani Jayaram
Oorukku Uzhaippavan	Iravu Paadagan Oruvan	M. S. Viswanathan	Na. Kamarasan	-
Oorukku Uzhaippavan	Iravu Paadagan Oruvan (Reprise)	M. S. Viswanathan	Na. Kamarasan	-
Oorukku Uzhaippavan	Azhagennum Oyiyam	M. S. Viswanathan	Muthulingam	P. Suseela
Oorukku Uzhaippavan	Iravu Paadagan Oruvan (Reprise)	M. S. Viswanathan	Na. Kamarasan	Vanisri (dialogue)
Oorukku Uzhaippavan	Pillai Thamizh Paadugiren	M. S. Viswanathan	Pulamaipithan	-
Oru Kodiyil Iru Malargal	Alangara Oviyam (Kannanin Sannathiyil)	M. S. Viswanathan		-
Oru Oodhappu Kan Simittugiradhu	Nalla Manam Vaazhga	Shankar–Ganesh		-
Payanam	Aaramba Kaalam	M. S. Viswanathan	Kannadasan	Vani Jayaram
Perum Pugazhum	Thaane Thanakkul	M. S. Viswanathan		
Punitha Anthoniyar	Aanandhamathu	M. S. Viswanathan		-
Punitha Anthoniyar	Annai Vendugiral	M. S. Viswanathan		-
Unakkaga Naan	Inimai Thotta (Ramu I Love You)	M. S. Viswanathan		T. M. Soundararajan
Unakkaga Naan	Iraivan Ulagathai Padaithana	M. S. Viswanathan	Kannadasan	-
Uzhaikkum Karangal	Naalai Ulagai Alavendum	M. S. Viswanathan	Pulamaipithan	M. S. Viswanathan
Varaprasadham	Gangai Nathi Oram	R. Govarthanam		Vani Jayaram
Vazhvu En Pakkam	Veenai Pesum Adhai	M. S. Viswanathan	Kannadasan	B. S. Sasirekha

==== 1977 ====
Film	Song	Composer(s)	Writer(s)	Co-artist(s)
Aalukkoru Aasai	Idhaya Mazhaiyil Nanaindha	Ilaiyaraaja		P. Suseela
Dheepam	Poovizhi Vaasalil Yaaradi	Ilaiyaraaja	Pulamaipithan	S. Janaki
Indru Pol Endrum Vaazhga	Anbukku Naan Adimai	M. S. Viswanathan	Muthulingam	-
Penn Jenmam	Chella Pillai Saravanan	Ilaiyaraaja		P. Suseela
Thaaliyaa Salangaiyaa	Vanji Idhu Vanji	K. V. Mahadevan		-
Uyarndhavargal	Iravan Irandu Bommaigal	Shankar–Ganesh		

==== 1978 ====
Film	Song	Composer(s)	Writer(s)	Co-artist(s)
Andaman Kadhali	Andhamaanai Paarungal	M. S. Viswanathan	Kannadasan	Vani Jayaram
Andaman Kadhali	Nianaivale Silai Seithu	M. S. Viswanathan	Kannadasan	Vani Jayaram
Annapoorani	Kannanukku Kobam Enna	V. Kumar		P. Suseela
Annapoorani	Unnai Paarkka Vendum	V. Kumar		-
Aval Appadithan	Uravugal Thodarkadhai	Ilaiyaraaja	Gangai Amaran	-
Ilamai Oonjal Aadukirathu	Kinnathil Then Vadithu	Ilaiyaraaja	Vaali	S. Janaki
Ithu Eppadi Irukku	Engum Niraindha	Ilaiyaraaja		S. Janaki
Machchanai Paatheengala	Maampoove Siru Mainaave	Chandrabose		P. Suseela
Madhuraiyai Meetta Sundharapandiyan	Thendralil Aadidum	M. S. Viswanathan	Pulamaipithan	Vani Jayaram
Mullum Malarum	Senthazham Poovil	Ilaiyaraaja	Kannadasan	-
Paruva Mazhai	Kaadhal Sangame	Salil Chowdhury		S. Janaki
Paruva Mazhai	Kaala Magal	Salil Chowdhury		
Paruva Mazhai	Needhiyum	Salil Chowdhury		
Paruva Mazhai	Maadapurave Vaa	Salil Chowdhury		-
Priya	Akkarai Cheemai Azhaginile	Ilaiyaraaja	Panju Arunachalam	-
Priya	Ennuyir Nee Thaane	Ilaiyaraaja	Panju Arunachalam	Jency Anthony
Priya	Sri Ramanin (Oh Priya)	Ilaiyaraaja	Panju Arunachalam	-
Priya	Yae Paadal Ondru	Ilaiyaraaja	Panju Arunachalam	S. Janaki
Vayasu Ponnu	Kanchi Pattuduthi Kasthuri	M. S. Viswanathan		S. Janaki(Humming)
Vaazhthungal	Arul Vadiye Param Porule	L. Vaidyanathan		-

==== 1979 ====
Film	Song	Composer(s)	Writer(s)	Co-artist(s)
Agal Vilakku	Yedho Ninaivugal Kanavugal	Ilaiyaraaja		S. P. Sailaja
Arumbugal	Cheri Kuzhandhaigal	M. S. Viswanathan	Jupiter Chinnadurai	S. Janaki
Imayam	Gangai Yamunai	M. S. Viswanathan		Vani Jayaram
Kaathal Kiligal	Nadhi Karai	K. V. Mahadevan	Muthulingam	S. P. Sailaja
Kaathal Kiligal	Sevvaaname	K. V. Mahadevan	Pulamaipithan	S. P. Sailaja
Kavari Maan	Bro Bharama	Ilaiyaraaja		
Kizhakkum Merkkum Sandhikkindrana	Oyivathai Varainthu	M. S. Viswanathan		-
Naan Vazhavaippen	Aagayam Mele	Ilaiyaraaja		Chorus
Neela Malargal	Idhu Iravaa Pagalaa	M. S. Viswanathan		Vani Jayaram
Oru Kovil Iru Deepangal	Entha Paathai	V. Dakshinamoorthy		-
Ore Vaanam Ore Bhoomi	Valamaana Boomiyil Sugamaana	M. S. Viswanathan	Kannadasan	-
Oru Vidukadhai Oru Thodarkadhai	Naayagan Oru Puram	Gangai Amaran		S. Janaki
Othaiyadi Padhaiyile	Cheppukkudam	Shankar–Ganesh	A. S. Prakasam	Vani Jayaram
Thirisoolam	Irandu Kaigal	M. S. Viswanathan	Kannadasan	S. P. Balasubrahmanyam
Thirisoolam	Thirumaalin Thiru Maarbil	M. S. Viswanathan	Kannadasan	Vani Jayaram
Valampuri Sangu	Enna Sugamoo	Gangai Amaran	Gangai Amaran	-

=== 1980s ===
Year	Movie	Song	Music	Lyrics	Co - Singer	
1980	Chilambu	Nambikkai Vaithu Vidu			-	
1980	Doorathu Idi Muzhakkam	Ullam Ellam Thalladuthe	Salil Chowdhury			
1980	Idhayaththil Ore Idam	Maanicka Vairangal	Ilaiyaraaja		Chorus	
1980	Ilamai Kolam	Vacha Paaravai Theerathadi	Ilaiyaraaja			
1980	Ilamai Kolam	Sridevi En Vaazhvil	Ilaiyaraaja			
1980	Karumbu Vil	Meenkodi Therile Manmadha	Ilaiyaraaja			
1980	Kumari Pennin Ullathile	Vaan Megame	Shankar–Ganesh		-	
1980	Malargale Malarungal	Gnabakam Illaiyo - (duet)	Ilaiyaraaja	Gangai Amaran	S. Janaki	
1980	Malargale Malarungal	Gnabakam Illaiyo - (Sad)	Ilaiyaraaja	Gangai Amaran	-	
1980	Mangala Nayagi	Kangalal Naan	V. Kumar		P. Suseela	
1980	Moodu Pani	Yen Iniya Pon Nilave	Ilaiyaraaja	Gangai Amaran	-	
1980	Ninaivil Oru Malar	Kalyana Swarangal	Shyam		Vani Jayaram	
1980	Ponnagaram	Vaazhkkindra Makkalukku	Shankar–Ganesh		-	
1980	Poraamai	Aanandha Raagam	S. D. Sekhar	Poovai Senguttuvan	-	
1980	Poraamai	Naan Paadum	S. D. Sekhar	Puvaiarasu	-	
1980	Poraamai	Saravana Poigayil	S. D. Sekhar	Puvaiarasu	B. S. Sasirekha	
1980	Puthiya Adimaigal	Magizham Poove	Ilaiyaraaja		P. Suseela	
1980	Saranam Ayyappa	Poi Indri	Chandrabose		-	
1980	Thai Pongal	Theertha Karai Thannile	Ilaiyaraaja	M. G. Vallabhan	Jency Anthony	
1980	Theneer	Unadhe Ila Maalaippozhuthu	Gangai Amaran		-	
1980	1981	Bala Nagamma	Koondhale Megam	Ilaiyaraaja		S. P. Sailaja
Kallukkul Therai	1981	Aththai Magalukku	Shyam	Aathukkottai Ramu	-	
Koocham	1981	Pon Vaanile	Gangai Amaran		-	
Koocham	1981	Hey Kannamma	Gangai Amaran		S. Janaki	
Kovil Puraa	1981	Vedham Nee Iniya Naadham	Ilaiyaraaja		-	
Madhu Malar	1981	Vaaname Mazhai Megame	Ilaiyaraaja		Uma Ramanan	
Meendum Kokila	1981	Chinna Chiru Vayathil	Ilaiyaraaja	Kannadasan	S. P. Sailaja	
Meendum Kokila	1981	Ponnana Meni	Ilaiyaraaja	Panju Arunachalam	S. Janaki	
Mouna Geethangal	1981	Mookkuthi Poo Mele Kaathu	Gangai Amaran	Vaali	S. Janaki	
Nenjile Thunivirunthal	1981	Chithirame Un Vizhigal	Shankar–Ganesh		B. Vasantha	
Netrikkann	1981	Ramanin Mohanam Janaki	Ilaiyaraaja	Kannadasan	S. Janaki	
Raja Paarvai	1981	Azhage Azhagu	Ilaiyaraaja	Kannadasan	-	
Salanam	1981	Paniye Vaa Panju	Shyam		S. P. Balasubrahmanyam, P. Suseela	
Sivappu Malli	1981	Rendu Kannum	Shankar–Ganesh	Vairamuthu	P. Suseela	
Sollathe Yaarum Kettaal	1981	Kettathu Kidaithathu Kodi	Shankar–Ganesh			
Tik Tik Tik	1981	Poo Malarthida	Ilaiyaraaja		Jency Anthony	
Vasantham Varum	1981	Thendral Thalaattu Neram	V. Kumar		P. Suseela	
1982	Anandha Ragam	Kadaloram kadaloram	Ilaiyaraaja	Panju Arunachalam	Ilaiyaraaja	
1982	Anandha Ragam	Kanavugale Kanavugale	Ilaiyaraaja	Gangai Amaran	-	
1982	Anandha Ragam	Megam Karukkuthu	Ilaiyaraaja	Panju Arunachalam	S. Janaki	
1982	Anandha Ragam	Oru Raagam Padalodu	Ilaiyaraaja	Gangai Amaran	-	
1982	Anandha Ragam	Oru Raagam Padalodu - (Sad)	Ilaiyaraaja	-		
1982	Echchil Iravugal	Kadarkaraiyil	Ilaiyaraaja	Kannadasan	-	
1982	Echchil Iravugal	Poo Mele Vesum	Ilaiyaraaja	Vallabhan	Vani Jayaram	
1982	Eera Vizhi Kaaviyangal	Kaadhal Panpaadu	Ilaiyaraaja	Vairamuthu	-	
1982	Eera Vizhi Kaaviyangal	Kanavil Mithakkum	Ilaiyaraaja	Gangai Amaran	-	
1982	Ethanai Konam Ethanai Parvai	Gowri Kalyana Vaibogame	Ilaiyaraaja	Thyagaraja Swamikal	-	
1982	Ethanai Konam Ethanai Parvai	Nidhi Kala Sugama	Ilaiyaraaja	Thyagaraja Swamikal	-	
1982	Ethanai Konam Ethanai Parvai	Kaalane Aanalum	Ilaiyaraaja	Avvaiyar	-	
1982	Ethanai Konam Ethanai Parvai	Paahimam Nee	Ilaiyaraaja	Thyagaraja Swamikal	-	
1982	Ethanai Konam Ethanai Parvai	Alaipayuthe Kanna	Ilaiyaraaja	Oothukkadu Venkata Kavi	S. Janaki	
1982	Ezhavathu Manithan	Endha Neramun	L. Vaidyanathan	Subramania Bharati	-	
1982	Ezhavathu Manithan	Kaakkai Siraginile	L. Vaidyanathan	Subramania Bharathi	-	
1982	Ezhavathu Manithan	Odi Vilaiyadu Paappa	L. Vaidyanathan	Subramania Bharathi	Saibaba	
1982	Manjal Nila	Ilam Manadhil Ezhum Kanavil	Ilaiyaraaja		-	
1982	Moondram Pirai	Kanne Kalaimaane	Ilaiyaraaja	Kannadasan	-	
1982	Moondram Pirai	Poongatru Puthithanathu	Ilaiyaraaja	Kannadasan	-	
1982	Nadamadum Silaigal	Ariyamai Irulil	Shankar–Ganesh		-	
1982	Paasa Madal	Vaa Vaa Vaanampadi			-	
1982	Pannai Purathu Pandavargal	Pathai Enge Payanam	Gangai Amaran		S. P. Sailaja	
1982	Pannai Purathu Pandavargal	Nallorgal Thunbamutral	Gangai Amaran		-	
1982	Punitha Malar	Maalai Vaanin	Shyam		S. Janaki	
1982	Punitha Malar	Oru Paarvai Parthaal	Shyam		S. Janaki	
1982	Puthukavithai	Vaare Vaa Ilam	Ilaiyaraaja	Vairamuthu	S. Janaki	
1982	Puthukavithai	Vellai Pura Ondru (Duet)	Ilaiyaraaja	Vairamuthu	S. Janaki	
1982	Puthukavithai	Vellai Pura Ondru (Sad)	Ilaiyaraaja	Vairamuthu	-	
1982	Raaga Bandhangal	Nalam Tharuvai	Kunnakudi Vaidyanathan		S. Janaki	
1982	Rajyam Illatha Rajakkal	Sugam Tharum	Shankar–Ganesh		-	
1982	Thooral Ninnu Pochchu	Boopalam Isaikkum	Ilaiyaraaja	Muthulingam	Uma Ramanan	
1982	Thooral Ninnu Pochchu	Yerikkarai Poongatre	Ilaiyaraaja	Chithambaranathan	-	
1982	Vadivangal	Thaneeril Meen	Chandrabose		-	
1982	Valibamey Vaa Vaa	Pon Vaana Poongavil	Ilaiyaraaja	Gangai Amaran	S. P. Sailaja	
1982	Valibamey Vaa Vaa	Kanne Baalam	Ilaiyaraaja	Vairamuthu	-	
1982	Vazhvey Maayam	Vaazhvey Maayam Indha	Ilaiyaraaja	Vaali	-	
1983	Idho Ennoru Devadas	Ethu Enna Rathiri	Lakshmi Kaanth Piyarilaal		-	
1983	Idho Ennoru Devadas	Puthu Parithayo	Lakshmi Kaanth Piyarilaal		-	
1983	Ilamai Kaalangal	Eeramaana Rojave	Ilaiyaraaja		S. Janaki	
1983	Ilamai Kaalangal	Paadavandhatho Gaanam	Ilaiyaraaja		P. Suseela	
1983	Kal Vadiyum Pookkal	Mazhai Kaala Megangal			-	
1983	Kann Sivanthaal Mann Sivakkum	Manithaa Manithaa	Ilaiyaraaja			
1983	Kashmir Kaadhali	Poo Pondra Pengale	G. K. Venkatesh		-	
1983	Kovil Mani Osai	Andavan Yaaraiyum	Gangai Amaran	Gangai Amaran	-	
1983	Manaivi Solle Manthiram	Athaadi Adhisayam	Ilaiyaraaja		Uma Ramanan	
1983	Thai Veedu	Mama Mama Yen Paarthe	Bappi Lahiri	Vaali	S. P. Balasubrahmanyam, S. Janaki	
1983	Ullam Uruguthadi	Tholin Meethu	Ilaiyaraaja	Vairamuthu	S. Janaki	
1983	Urangatha Ninaivugal	Mouname Nenjil Naalum	Ilaiyaraaja	M. G. Vallabhan	Ilaiyaraaja	
1983	Uyirullavarai Usha	Vaigai Karai Kaatre	Vijaya T. Rajendar		-	
1984	Anbe Odi Vaa	Ithazhil Amutham	Ilaiyaraaja			
1984	Anbulla Rajinikanth	Muthumani Chudare Vaa	Ilaiyaraaja	Na. Kamarasan	-	
1984	Kuzhanthai Yesu	Kanne Vaa Kanmaniye	Shyam		-	
1984	My Dear Kuttichathan	Poovadai Kaatre	Ilaiyaraaja		-	
1984	Naalai Unathu Naal	Vennilaa Oduthu	Ilaiyaraaja	Na. Kamarasan	Vani Jayaram	
1984	Nallavanukku Nallavan	Chittukku Chella	Ilaiyaraaja	Na. Kamarajan	-	
1984	Nallavanukku Nallavan	Unnaithaane Thanjam	Ilaiyaraaja	Vairamuthu	Majula	
1984	Nallavanukku Nallavan	Vachukkavaa Unna	Ilaiyaraaja	Gangai Amaran	S. Janaki	
1984	Nallavanukku Nallavan	Ennai Thaane	Ilaiyaraaja	Vairamuthu	-	
1984	Neengal Kettavai	Kanavu Kaanum Vaazhkai	Ilaiyaraaja	Vairamuthu	-	
1984	Neengal Kettavai	Pillai Nila - (Male)	Ilaiyaraaja	Vairamuthu	-	
1984	Nilavu Suduvathillai	Paari Jaatham	Ilaiyaraaja	Muthulingam	S. Janaki	
1984	Nilavu Suduvathillai	Naalum En Manam	Ilaiyaraaja	Pulamaipithan	S. Janaki, G. K. Vidhya	
1984	Niraparaadhi	Pennukku Deivam Endru	Shankar–Ganesh	Pulamaipithan		
1984	Nooravathu Naal	Ulagam Muzhuvathum	Ilaiyaraaja	Vairamuthu	Vani Jayaram	
1984	Nyayam	Gangai Nathai Meeno	Ilaiyaraaja		S. Janaki	
1984	Poovilangu	Kannil Etho Minnal	Ilaiyaraaja	Vairamuthu	S. Janaki	
1984	Pudhiavan	Naano Kann Paarthen	V. S. Narasimhan		Kalyan	
1984	Pudhumai Penn	Kaalai Neram	Ilaiyaraaja	Vairamuthu	-	
1984	Pudhumai Penn	Kasthuri Maane	Ilaiyaraaja	Vairamuthu	Uma Ramanan	
1984	Raja Gopuram	Velanjirukku	Ilaiyaraaja	Mu. Metha	S. P. Sailaja	
1984	Sanga Natham	Yethetho Sonnanga	Ilaiyaraaja	Vairamuthu	P. Jayachandran, Vani Jayaram	
1984	Sirai	Raasathi Rosappoo	M. S. Viswanathan		Vani Jayaram	
1984	Unnai Naan Santhithen	Unnai Kaanum Neram	Ilaiyaraaja		Vani Jayaram	
1984	Unnai Naan Santhithen	Hey I Love You	Ilaiyaraaja		Vani Jayaram	
1984	Uravai Kaatha Kili	Enthan Paadalgalil	Vijaya T. Rajendar	Vijaya T. Rajendar	B. S. Sasirekha	
1985	Aasha	Maaligai Aanalum	K. V. Mahadevan		Vani Jayaram	
1985	Ammavum Neeye Appavum Neeye	Kai Veesamma	M. S. Viswanathan		-	
1985	Amutha Gaanam	Ore Raagam Ore Thaalam	Ilaiyaraaja		S. Janaki	
1985	Aval Sumangalithan	Ninaithaal Inikkum	M. S. Viswanathan		-	
1985	Bandham	Bandham Bandham Paasa	M. S. Viswanathan		-	
1985	Bandham	Kattil Bandham Kadal Bandham	M. S. Viswanathan		-	
1985	Engirunthalum Vazhga	Vaanam Thedum Megam	Shankar–Ganesh		-	
1985	Erimalai	Ore Baashaiyil	M. S. Viswanathan		S. Janaki	
1985	Janani	Mannikka Mattaaya	M. S. Viswananthan	Nethaji	-	
1985	Ketti Melam	Dhaagame Undaanathe	Ilaiyaraaja		Uma Ramanan	
1985	Neethiyin Marupakkam	Maalai Karukkalil - (Duet)	Ilaiyaraaja		S. Janaki	
1985	Neethiyin Marupakkam	Maalai Karukkalil (Sad)	Ilaiyaraaja		-	
1985	Oru Kaidhiyin Diary	ABC Nee Vaasi	Ilaiyaraaja	Vairamuthu	Vani Jayaram	
1985	Padikkadavan	Oorai Therinchikkitta	Ilaiyaraaja	Vairamuthu	-	
1985	Prema Paasam	En Radhaiye	Gangai Amaran	Vaali	S. Janaki	
1985	Poove Poochooda Vaa	Poove Poochooda Vaa - (Male)	Ilaiyaraaja	Vairamuthu	-	
1985	Pudhu Yugam	Poovo Ponno Poovizhi	Gangai Amaran	Gangai Amaran	S. Janaki	
1985	Raja Rishi	Maan Kanden Maan	Ilaiyaraaja	Ilaiyaraaja	Vani Jayaram	
1985	Rajathi Rojakili	Muttayi Thenkuzhai	Chandrabose		-	
1985	Rajathi Rojakili	Odiyenna Nallodai	Chandrabose		-	
1985	Sindhu Bhairavi	Mahaganapathin	Ilaiyaraaja	Muthuswamy Dikshitar	-	
1985	Sindhu Bhairavi	Mari Marin Ninne	Ilaiyaraaja	Thyagaraja	-	
1985	Sindhu Bhairavi	Poomaalai Vaangi Vandhaan	Ilaiyaraaja		-	
1985	Sindhu Bhairavi	Moham Ennum Maaya	Ilaiyaraaja	Subramania Bharathi	-	
1985	Sindhu Bhairavi	Kalaivaaniye	Ilaiyaraaja		-	
1985	Sindhu Bhairavi	Thanni Thotti Thedi	Ilaiyaraaja		-	
1985	Sindhu Bhairavi	Manadhil Uruthi Vendum	Ilaiyaraaja	Subramania Bharathi	-	
1985	Sindhu Bhairavi	Lochchana	Ilaiyaraaja		-	
1985	Sri Raghavendrar	Aadal Kalaiye	Ilaiyaraaja	Vaali	-	
1985	Sri Raghavendrar	Azhaikkiran Maadhavan	Ilaiyaraaja	Vaali	Malaysia Vasudevan	
1985	Sri Raghavendrar	Mazhaikku Oru Devane	Ilaiyaraaja	Vaali	-	
1985	Sri Raghavendrar	Raama Naamam	Ilaiyaraaja	Vaali	Vani Jayaram	
1985	Thendrale Ennai Thodu	Kanmani Nee	Ilaiyaraaja	Vairamuthu	Uma Ramanan	
1985	Thendrale Ennai Thodu	Thendral Vandhu	Ilaiyaraaja	Vaali	S. Janaki	
1985	Unakkaga Oru Roja	Oru Pullankuzhal Oomai	Vijaya T. Rajendar	Vijaya T. Rajendar	-	
1985	Un Kannil Neer Vazhindal	Enna Desamo	Ilaiyaraaja	Vairamuthu	-	
1985	Unnidam Mayangukiren	Deivam Nammai	Chandrabose		Vani Jayaram	
1985	Urimai	Maalare Nalamaa Madi	Ilaiyaraaja		S. Janaki	
1985	Uyarndha Ullam	Enge En Jeevane	Ilaiyaraaja	Vairamuthu	S. Janaki	
1985	Vellai Manasu	Pachchapulla	Shankar–Ganesh		-	
1986	Amman Kovil Kizhakale	Un Paarvaiyil (Duet)	Ilaiyaraaja	Gangai Amaran	K. S. Chithra	
1986	Amman Kovil Kizhakale	Un Paarvaiyil (Male)	Ilaiyaraaja	Gangai Amaran	-	
1986	Dharma Devathai	Thodu Thodu Vaa Mella	Raveendran		-	
1986	Dharma Pathini	Mutham Katti Mutham	Ilaiyaraaja		K. S. Chithra	
1986	December Pookal	Maalaigal Idam Maaruthu				
1986	Enakku Nane Needipathi	Ichandru Ichandru Mutham	Ilaiyaraaja	Pulamaipithan	S. Janaki	
1986	Engal Thaaikulame Varuga	Vaan Vandhu Then Sindhum	Chandrabose		-	
1986	Isai Paadum Thendral	Disco King Disco Queen	Ilaiyaraaja		Vani Jayaram	
1986	Isai Paadum Thendral	Enthan Kaikuttaiyai	Ilaiyaraaja			
1986	Isai Paadum Thendral	Manasuloni	Ilaiyaraaja		S. Janaki	
1986	Isai Paadum Thendral	Raghuvara Nannu	Ilaiyaraaja		S. Janaki	
1986	Isai Paadum Thendral	Vaazhai Maram	Ilaiyaraaja		S. Janaki	
1986	Isai Paadum Thendral	Eswaram	Ilaiyaraaja			
1986	Jothi Malar	Vennila Mugam Paaduthu	Shankar–Ganesh		Vani Jayaram	
1986	Jothi Malar	Pirapatharukkum Irapatharkkum	Shankar–Ganesh		-	
1986	Kadaikkan Parvai	Isaiyin Mazhaiyile	V. S. Narasimhan		Vani Jayaram	
1986	Kadaikkan Parvai	Isaiyum Medai	V. S. Narasimhan		-	
1986	Kadaikkan Parvai	Etho Oru Raagam	V. S. Narasimhan		-	
1986	Kaalamellam Un Madiyil	Kannana Kanney Yen	Chandrabose	Vairamuthu	-	
1986	Kanmaniye Pesu	Maname Mayagathe			-	
1986	Kanne Kaniyamuthe	Ninnaiye Rathi Endru	M. S. Viswanathan	Subramania Bharathi	B. S. Sasirekha	
1986	Kulirkaala Megangal	Vaanam Sevvaanam Ven	Shankar–Ganesh	Vaali	Vani Jayaram	
1986	Manithanin Marupakkam	Oomai Nenjin Sondham	Ilaiyaraaja			
1986	Mannukkul Vairam	Idhazhodu Idhazh serum	Devendran		S. Janaki	
1986	Maragatha Veenai	Maragatha Veenai	Ilaiyaraaja		S. Janaki	
1986	Mel Maruvathoor Arpudhangal	Unna Thaane Malaiya	K. V. Mahadevan	Vaali		
1986	Mel Maruvathoor Arpudhangal	Enna Pethavale	K. V. Mahadevan	Vaali		
1986	Mythili Ennai Kaathali	Ada Ponnana Manase	Vijaya T. Rajendar		Vijaya T. Rajendar	
1986	Naalellam Pournami	Neethaana Nijam thaana	Gangai Amaran		K. S. Chithra	
1986	Naalellam Pournami	Poongathe Poongathe	Gangai Amaran		-	
1986	Nambinar Keduvathillai	Karpooram Jolikkuthaiya	M. S. Viswanathan		-	
1986	Nambinar Keduvathillai	Nambinaar Keduvathillai	M. S. Viswanathan		-	
1986	Nambinar Keduvathillai	Eswaraa Jagatheeswaraa	M. S. Viswanathan		-	
1986	Nambinar Keduvathillai	Dharmassthaave	M. S. Viswanathan		-	
1986	Natpu	Adhikaalai Subavelai	Ilaiyaraaja	Vairamuthu	S. Janaki	
1986	Neethana Antha Kuyil	En Jeevan Paaduthu	Ilaiyaraaja		-	
1986	Neethana Antha Kuyil	Kannana Kanna (Male)	Ilaiyaraaja		-	
1986	Nilave Malare	Maalai Ponnana	M. S. Viswanathan	Kuruvikkarambai	Vani Jayaram	
1986	Ninaivo Oru Paravai	Endhan Kanne	Jerry Amaldev		B. S. Sasirekha	
1986	Oomai Vizhigal	Nilai Maarum Ulagil	Manoj–Gyan	Aabavanan	-	
1986	Rasigan Oru Rasigai	Ezhisai Geethame (Male)	Raveendran	Pulamaipithan	-	
1986	Rasigan Oru Rasigai	Paadi Azhaithen Unnai	Raveendran	M. G. Vallaban		
1986	Panneer Nadhigal	Pani Vizhum Paruva	Shankar–Ganesh	Muthulingam	-	
1986	Poi Mugangal	Inge Naam Kaanum	Shankar–Ganesh		-	
1986	Poi Mugangal	Thottu Kondal Oru	Shankar–Ganesh	Vairamuthu	-	
1986	Puthir	Hero Hero	Ilaiyaraaja	Ponnaruvi	-	
1986	Puthir	Muthal Mutham	Ilaiyaraaja	Mu. Metha	S. Janaki	
1986	Puthir	Ellam Theriyum	Ilaiyaraaja	Vairamuthu	-	
1986	Sivappu Malargal	Oru Bommalaattam Nadakkuthu	M. S. Viswanathan		-	
1986	Revathi	Athanin Nenjukulle Tik	Shankar–Ganesh	Vairamuthu	-	
1986	Thaaiku Oru Thaalaattu	Aaraariroo	Ilaiyaraaja	Vairamuthu	-	
1986	Unnidathil Naan	Ninaithal Unnaithaan	Thayanban	Vaali	-	
1986	Vasantha Raagam	Naan Ullathai Sollattuma	M. S. Viswanathan		P. Suseela	
1986	Vikram	Sippikkul Oru Muthu	Ilaiyaraaja	Vairamuthu	S. Janaki	
1986	Yaaro Ezhuthiya Kavithai	Aaha Aayiram Sugam	Anand Shankar		Vani Jayaram	
1986	Yaaro Ezhuthiya Kavithai	Paruvam Kaninthu Vandha	Anand Shankar		Vani Jayaram	
1986	Yaaro Ezhuthiya Kavithai	Yaar Pogum Vazhiyil	Anand Shankar		-	
1987	Aalappirandhavan	Unnaiyum Ennaiyum	Ilaiyaraaja	Ilaiyaraaja	S. Janaki	
1987	Aankalai Nambathey	Kaadhal Kaayangale	Devendran		Malaysia Vasudevan	
1987	Anbulla Appa	Anbu Thaaye Nee	Shankar–Ganesh	Vairamuthu	-	
1987	Anbulla Appa	Idhu Paal Vadiyum	Shankar–Ganesh	Vairamuthu	-	
1987	Anbulla Appa	Maragathavallikku Manakolam	Shankar–Ganesh	Vairamuthu	-	
1987	Ini Oru Sudhanthiram	Endru Thaniyum	Gangai Amaran	Subramania Bharathi	-	
1987	Ini Oru Sudhanthiram	Mohathai Kondru Vidu	Gangai Amaran	Subramania Bharathi|	K. S. Chithra	
1987	Kavithai Paada Neramillai	Pulliyai Vaithavan Iraivan	L. Vaidyanathan		-	
1987	Kizhakku Africavil Sheela	Sheela Oh My Sheela	Bappi Lahari	Vaali	K. S. Chithra	
1987	Manathil Uruthi Vendum	Manathil Uruthi Vendum	Ilaiyaraaja	Vaali		
1987	Manathil Uruthi Vendum	Kannaa Varuvayaa	Ilaiyaraaja	Vaali	K. S. Chithra	
1987	Manathil Uruthi Vendum	Sangathamizh Kaviye	Ilaiyaraaja	Vaali	K. S. Chithra	
1987	Manathil Uruthi Vendum	Vangala Kadale	Ilaiyaraaja	Vaali	-	
1987	Manithan	Yedho Nadakkiradhu	Chandrabose	Vairamuthu	K. S. Chithra	
1987	Megam Karuthirukku	Azhagana Pullimaane	Manoj–Gyan		-	
1987	Micheal Raj	Kaalam Poranthaachu	Chandrabose	Mu. Metha	-	
1987	Muthukkal Moondru	Devan Kovil Deepame	T. Rajendar		-	
1987	Neethikku Thandanai	Chinnachiru Kiliye	M. S. Viswanathan		Swarnalatha	
1987	Neram Nalla Irukku	Sariyena Ezhu Swarangalum	M. S. Viswanathan		K. S. Chithra	
1987	Ninaikka Therintha Maname	Chinna Chinna Muthu	Ilaiyaraaja		S. Janaki	
1987	Ninaikka Therintha Maname	Engengu Nee Sendra	Ilaiyaraaja		K. S. Chithra	
1987	Ninaikka Therintha Maname	Kannukkum Kannukkum	Ilaiyaraaja		-	
1987	Oorkavalan	Edutha Sabtham	Shankar–Ganesh		-	
1987	Oru Thayin Sabhatham	Enathu Gaanam	Vijaya T. Rajendar	Vijaya T. Rajendar	S. Janaki	
1987	Paruva Raagam	Kaadhalillai Endru	Hamsalekha	Vairamuthu	S. Janaki	
1987	Pookkal Vidum Thoothu	Kathiravanai Paarthu	Vijaya T. Rajendar		-	
1987	Poovizhi Vasalile	Chinna Chinna Roja	Ilaiyaraaja		-	
1987	Poovizhi Vasalile	Oru Kiliyin (Male)	Ilaiyaraaja		-	
1987	Rettai Vaal Kuruvi	Raja Raja Chozhan	Ilaiyaraaja	Mu. Metha	-	
1987	Sattam Oru Vilayaattu	Oru Kulla Nari	M. S. Viswanathan	Pulamaipithan	S. N. Surendar, Shoba Sekar	
1987	Sirai Paravai	Raasathi Rosapoo Vetkam	Ilaiyaraaja		Vani Jayaram	
1987	Sirai Paravai	Aanadham Pongida	Ilaiyaraaja		Sunatha	
1987	Shankar Guru	Chinna Chinna Poove (Male)	Chandrabose	Vairamuthu	-	
1987	Thaali Dhaanam	En Deiva Veenaiye	M. S. Viswanathan		-	
1987	Thaye Neeye Thunai	Bhuvaneswari Arupuri	Raveendran		-	
1987	Thirumathi Oru Vegumathi	Valarpirai Embathhum	Shankar–Ganesh	Vairamuthu	-	
1987	Thulasi (film)	Ooraiyellam Kappathum	Sampath Siva	Vairamuthu	-	
1987	Ullam Kavarntha Kalvan	Kaalangathaale	Ilaiyaraaja		K. S. Chithra	
1987	Velicham	Thulli Thulli Pogum	Manoj–Gyan		-	
1987	Velundu Vinaiyillai	Unavinil	M. S. Viswanathan	Tamil Nambi	-	
1987	Vilangu	Unnaithaan	Shyam	Vairamuthu	-	
1988	Adhu Antha Kaalam	Azhagana Sondhangal	Chandrabose			
1988	Adhu Antha Kaalam	Pottirukka Poovirukka	Chandrabose		-	
1988	Agni Natchathiram	Thoongatha Vizhigal	Ilaiyaraaja	Vaali	S. Janaki	
1988	Agni Natchathiram	Vaa Vaa Anbe Anbe	Ilaiyaraaja	Vaali	K. S. Chithra	
1988	Aval Mella Sirithal	Mangala Kunkumam Vandhathu	Gangai Amaran		-	
1988	Aval Mella Sirithal	Thegam Engum Moga Vellam	Gangai Amaran		-	
1988	Dharmathin Thalaivan	Muththamizh Kaviye	Ilaiyaraaja	Panju Arunachalam	K. S. Chithra	
1988	En Bommukutty Ammavukku	En Bommukutti Ammavukku	Ilaiyaraaja	Vaali	-	
1988	En Bommukutty Ammavukku	Kuyile Kuyile	Ilaiyaraaja	Gangai Amaran	K. S. Chithra	
1988	En Bommukutty Ammavukku	Kuyile Kuyile (Male)	Ilaiyaraaja	Gangai Amaran	-	
1988	En Bommukutty Ammavukku	Uyirin Uyire	Ilaiyaraaja	Piraisoodan	K. S. Chithra	
1988	En Thangachi Padichava	Sondha Sumaya	Gangai Amaran	Gangai Amaran	K. S. Chithra	
1988	Idhu Namma Aalu	Kannurangu Ponmayile	K. Bhagyaraj	Muthulingam	-	
1988	Jaathi Pookkal	Athai Magalum Illai	Shyam		-	
1988	Jaathi Pookkal	Poomaalai Iru Thol Seruma	Shyam		-	
1988	Jaathi Pookkal	Vaa Vaa Aadivaa	Shyam		-	
1988	Kaalaiyum Neeye Maalaiyum Neeye	Rathirikku Konjam	Devendran		-	
1988	Kalyana Paravaigal	Kolam Inge Vaasal	Raja & Rajan		-	
1988	Kan Simittum Neram	Raagam Pudhu Raagam	V. S. Narasimhan		-	
1988	Katha Nayagan	Poo Poothathai Yaar Paarthathu	Chandrabose	Vairamuthu	-	
1988	Makkal Aanaiyittaal	Raajiyam Thaan Ethum Illa	Shankar–Ganesh		-	
1988	Madurakkara Thambi	Iravum Orunaal Vidiyum	Shankar–Ganesh	Mu. Metha	-	
1988	Ninaive Ennai Nerungathe	Sangam Nam Sangam			-	
1988	Ore Oru Gramathiley	Rettai Kiligal	Ilaiyaraaja			
1988	Ore Oru Gramathiley	Mano Jabam	Ilaiyaraaja			
1988	Oruvar Vaazhum Aalayam	Nee Pournami Endrum	Ilaiyaraaja		-	
1988	Oruvar Vaazhum Aalayam	Uyire Uyire Urangatha	Ilaiyaraaja		S. Janaki	
1988	Paadatha Thenikkal	Vanna Nilave Vangai	Ilaiyaraaja	Vaali	-	
1988	Paasa Paravaigal	Thenpandi Thamizhe (Duet)	Ilaiyaraaja	Gangai Amaran	K. S. Chithra	
1988	Paasa Paravaigal	Thenpandi Thamizhe (Male)	Ilaiyaraaja	Gangai Amaran	-	
1988	Parambaraikal	Vaanam Enge Mudikirathu			-	
1988	Poonthotta Kaavalkaaran	Adi Kaanakarunkuyile	Ilaiyaraaja	Gangai Amaran	-	
1988	Poonthotta Kaavalkaaran	Sindhiya Venmani	Ilaiyaraaja	Gangai Amaran	P. Suseela	
1988	Sivapputhaali	Oda Thanni Uppu Thanni	Shankar–Ganesh		-	
1988	Poovukkul Boogambam	Oru Kaalam Varum	Gangai Amaran		-	
1988	Solla Thudikuthu Manasu	Poove Sempoove	Ilaiyaraaja	Vaali	-	
1988	Thaimel Aanai	Entha Kadhai Solla	Chandrabose	Vairamuthu	S. P. Balasubrahmanyam & M. S. Rajeswari	
1988	Thaimel Aanai	Chinna Kanna Chella Kanna (Male)	Chandrabose	Vairamuthu	-	
1988	Thambi Thanga Kambi	Aayiram Thalaimurai	Gangai Amaran		-	
1988	Thambi Thanga Kambi	Sri Ranjani Yen Sivaranjani	Gangai Amaran		-	
1988	Thanga Kalasam	Kanni Aval Naanugiraal	M. S. Viswanathan	London Gopal	K. S. Chithra	
1988	Thanga Kalasam	Thamizhgnana Kalai	M. S. Viswanathan	London Gopal	K. S. Chithra	
1988	Unnal Mudiyum Thambi	Maanida Sevai	Ilaiyaraaja	Pulamaipithan	-	
1988	Unnal Mudiyum Thambi	Nee Ondru Thaan	Ilaiyaraaja		-	
1988	Uzhaithu Vaazha Vendum	Muthukkal Padhikkatha Kannil	Devendran		K. S. Chithra	
1988	Uzhaithu Vaazha Vendum	Vaangi Vandhen	Devendran		-	
1988	Vasanthi	Santhosam Kaanadha	Chandrabose		-	
1988	Vasanthi	Ravi Varman Ezhuthatha	Chandrabose		K. S. Chithra	
1988	Veedu Manaivi Makkal	Kaadhal Kaadhal	Shankar–Ganesh		-	
1989	Agni Theertham	Bhoopalam Arangerum Velai	Shankar–Ganesh	Senthamizh Selvan	-	
1989	Agni Theertham	Devi Un Paadham Thannil	Shankar–Ganesh	Sri Bharathi	Sujatha Radhakrishnan	
1989	En Kanavar	Yen Thaan Ennodu	Sangeetha Rajan		-	
1989	En Kanavar	Kaadhadum Neram	Sangeetha Rajan		-	
1989	Kadhal Oivathillai	Poda Ulagamellam	Ilaiyaraaja		-	
1989	Nyaya Tharasu	Vaanam Arugil	Shankar–Ganesh		-	
1989	Nyaya Tharasu	Yaarukku Arudhal Yaaro	Shankar–Ganesh			
1989	Ore Oru Gramathile	Rettai Kiligal Andradum	Ilaiyaraaja	Vaali	K. S. Chithra	
1989	Ore Oru Gramathile	Mano Jabam (Male)	Ilaiyaraaja	Vaali	-	
1989	Paasa Kanal	O Nenjame	S. A. Rajkumar	S. A.Rajkumar	Sunatha	
1989	Paasa Kanal	Therukku Purama Oru Vaasal	S. A. Rajkumar	S. A. Rajkumar	K. S. Chithra	
1989	Paasa Kanal	Therukku Purama - Sad	S. A. Rajkumar	S. A. Rajkumar	-	
1989	Pillaikkaga	Un Annai Naan	Gangai Amaran		-	
1989	Pudhea Paadhai	Appa Yaaru Amma	Ilaiyaraaja	Vairamuthu	-	
1989	Raja Chinna Roja	Oru Panpaadu Illai	Chandrabose	Vairamuthu	-	
1989	Raasathi Kalyanam	Ippadiyum Nadakkumendru	Shankar–Ganesh		-	
1989	Samsara Sangeetham	Aararo Thaai Paada	Vijaya T. Rajendar	Vijaya T. Rajendar	-	
1989	Samsara Sangeetham	Paal Kothicha Pongi	Vijaya T. Rajendar	Vijaya T. Rajendar	-	
1989	Samsara Sangeetham	Santhega Puyaladicha	Vijaya T. Rajendar	Vijaya T. Rajendar	-	
1989	Sangu Pushpangal	Kannukkul Deepam Ethi	Guna Singh		K. S. Chithra	
1989	Sangu Pushpangal	Nila Nila Odivaa -Male	Guna Singh		-	
1989	Sangu Pushpangal	Solai Kuyil Paaduthe	Guna Sngh		-	
1989	Sattathin Marupakkam	Kanni Poove Kanni Poove	Shankar–Ganesh	Vairamuthu	-	
1989	Sattathin Thirappu Vizhaa	Innum Enthan	Shankar–Ganesh		-	
1989	Sondhakkaaran	Katti Thangame Unnai	Chandrabose		-	
1989	Sondhakkaaran	Katti Thangame Unnai - 2	Chandrabose		-	
1989	Varusham 16	Gangai Karai Mannanadi	Ilaiyaraaja	Vaali	-	
1989	Varusham 16	Karaiyatha Manamum	Ilaiyaraaja	Vaali	K. S. Chithra	
1989	Varusham 16	Pazhamuthir Cholai	Ilaiyaraaja	Vaali	-	
1989	Vetrimel Vetri	Kannana Kanmaniye			K. S. Chithra	
1989	Vettaiyaadu Vilaiyaadu (1989 film)	Punnagai Puriyatha	Chandrabose	Vairamuthu	S. P. Sailaja	

=== 1990s ===
Year	Movie	Song	Music	Lyrics	Co — Singer
1990	Amma Pillai	Pogum Paadhai Enge	Shankar–Ganesh	Poovai Senguttuvan	-
1990	Arangetra Velai	Aagaya Vennilave	Ilaiyaraaja	Vaali	Uma Ramanan
1990	En Kadhal Kanmani	Gangai Eppothum	L. Vaidyanathan	Vairamuthu	-
1990	Enakkoru Neethi	Kanneerale Vidhiyin Kaigal	V. Kumar		-
1990	Ethir Kaatru	Koondai Vittu	Ilaiyaraaja		-
1990	Keladi Kanmani	Nee Pathi Naan Pathi	Ilaiyaraaja	Vaali	Uma Ramanan
1990	Keladi Kanmani	Thendral Thaan	Ilaiyaraaja		K. S. Chithra
1990	Malaicharal	Muthumaniye Muthumaniye	M. S. Murari	Vairamuthu	-
1990	Malaicharal	Muthumaniye Muthumaniye (duet)	M. S. Murari	Vairamuthu	S. P. Balasubrahmanyam
1990	Mallu Vetti Minor	Chinna Mani Ponnu Mani	Ilaiyaraaja		K. S. Chithra Uma Ramanan
1990	Mappillai Singam (1990 film)	Andhi Mayangum Nerathile	Shankar–Ganesh		-
1990	Manukketha Ponnu (1990 film)	Oru Ezha Vacha Vaazha	Deva		-
1990	Manukketha Ponnu (1990 film)	Nandhavanam	Deva		-
1990	Moondram Manithargal	Azhagu Devathai	S. Ravi Varman		-
1990	Moondram Manithargal	Kaadhal Nadhiyil	S. Ravi Varman		K. S. Chithra
1990	Mounam Sammadham	Kalyaana Then Nilaa	Ilaiyaraaja		K. S. Chithra
1990	Muthalali Amma	Ennil Vaazhum	Chandrabose		S. Janaki
1990	Naan Valartha Poove	Lylave Lyla	Rajesh Khanna	Rajesh Khanna	-
1990	Nalvaazhthukkal	Naalu Peru Pona			
1990	Namma Ooru Poovatha	Chinna Chinna Poove	Deva	Kalidasan	K. S. Chithra
1990	NangalPuthiyavargal	Unnai Sandhithen	Ilaiyaraaja		
1990	Nila Penne	Pudhu Uravu	Vidyasagar	Vairamuthu	P. Suseela
1990	Nyayangal Jaikkattum	Kakangal Parandhaalum			
1990	Paattali Magan	Poothiruchi Kannu	Sangeetha Rajan		Sujatha Mohan
1990	Periya Veetu Pannakkaran	Malligaiye Malligaiiye	Ilaiyaraaja	Na. Kamarasan	K. S. Chithra
1990	Periya Veetu Pannakkaran	Muthu Muthu Medai	Ilaiyaraaja	Muthulingam	S. Janaki
1990	Pudhu Vasantham	Paattu Onnu Naan - Male	S. A. Rajkumar		-
1990	Pulan Visaranai	Kuyile Kuyile	Ilaiyaraaja	Gangai Amaran	Uma Ramanan
1990	Raja Kaiya Vacha	Kanneer Thuli	Ilaiyaraaja		-
1990	Raja Kaiya Vacha	Mazhai Varuthu	Ilaiyaraaja		K. S. Chithra
1990	Rayil Snegham	Antha Veenaikku			
1990	Rayil Snegham	Rayil Sneham			-
1990	Sandhana Kaatru	Oh Thendrale Oru (Male)	Shankar–Ganesh		-
1990	Sathya Vaakku	Vaigai Nathiyodu	Gyaan Varma		K. S. Chithra
1990	Sirayil Pootha Chinna Malar	Adhisaya Nadamidum	Ilaiyaraaja	Vaali	K. S. Chithra
1990	Sirayil Sila Raagangal	Kai Pidithu	Ilaiyaraaja	Ilaiyaraaja	K. S. Chithra
1990	Sirayil Sila Raagangal	Thendral Varum	Ilaiyaraaja	Ilaiyaraaja	K. S. Chithra
1990	Thangathin Thangam	Oru Kelayil Iru	S. A. Rajkumar	Vaali	-
1990	Ula Vandha Nila	Nee Yaaro			-
1990	Unnai Solli Kutramillai	Sorgathin Vaasapadi	Ilaiyaraaja	Vaali	K. S. Chithra
1990	Uyirea Uyireaa	Neram Varum	M. S. Viswanathan	Poovai Senguttuvan	B. S. Sasirekha
1990	Vaigasi Poranthachu	Kanne Karisal	Deva	Kalidasan	Swarnalatha
1990	Varavu Nalla Uravu	Thaneeril Thalladum	Shankar–Ganesh		
1991	Cheran Pandiyan	Chinna Thangam	Soundharyan	Soundharyan	-
1991	Dharma Durai	Annan Enna Thambi	Ilaiyaraaja		-
1991	Dharma Durai	Maasi Maasam Aalana	Ilaiyaraaja		Swarnalatha
1991	Eeramana Rojave	Thendral Kaatre Konjam	Ilaiyaraaja	Vaali	S. Janaki
1991	Eeramana Rojave	Vaa Vaa Anbe	Ilaiyaraaja	Vaali	S. Janaki
1991	Gopura Vasalile	Naatham	Ilaiyaraaja		S. Janaki
1991	Gunaa	Paartha Vizhi Paarthapadi	Ilaiyaraaja	Vaali	-
1991	Idhayam	Pottu Vaitha Oru	Ilaiyaraaja	Vaali	-
1991	Idhaya Vaasal	Kaadhal Jodithaan	Viji		-
1991	Karpoora Mullai	Poongaviyam Pesum	Ilaiyaraaja	Vaali	P. Suseela, K. S. Chithra
1991	Maanagara Kaaval	Thodi Raagam Paadavaa	Chandrabose	Vaali	K. S. Chithra
1991	Maanagara Kaaval	Kaalai Neram	Chandrabose		-
1991	Nee Pathi Naan Pathi	Devan Theerpendru	Maragadha Mani		-
1991	Nee Pathi Naan Pathi	Yaarai Kettu Eera	Maragadha Mani		K. S. Chithra
1991	Malaicharal	Muthumaniye Muthumaniye	Murari	Vairamuthu	-
1991	Moondrezhuthil En Moochirukkum	Santhana Kili Irandu	Ilaiyaraaja	Kalidasan	K. S. Chithra
1991	Moondrezhuthil En Moochirukkum	Agayam Kondraal	Ilaiyaraaja	Kalidasan	P. Suseela
1991	Moondrezhuthil En Moochirukkum	Agayam Kondraal - Sad	Ilaiyaraaja	Kalidasan	-
1991	Naan Pudicha Mappillai	Kudumbam Oru Kovil	Deva		
1991	Nadodi Kaadhal	Aathukku Pakkam	Deva	Kalidasan	Swarnalatha
1991	Nee Pathi Naan Pathi	Yaarai Kettu	Maragadha Mani		K. S. Chithra
1991	Nee Pathi Naan Pathi	Thevan Theerpendrum	Maragadha Mani		-
1991	Nenjil Oru Tajmahal	Kodi Maram Saivathundu	Sivaji Raja		P. Suseela
1991	Oorellam Un Paattu Thaan	Oorellam Un Paattu	Ilaiyaraaja		-
1991	Pandhiya Kuthiraigal	Pooncholaiyaa	Major Saran		-
1991	Perum Pulli	Ponmagal Vandhaal	S. A. Rajkumar		
1991	Pudhu Manithan	Valaikku Thappiya Meenu	Deva		-
1991	Putham Pudhu Payanam	Kaalai Pani	Soundharyan	Soundharyan	
1991	Putham Pudhu Payanam	Paadungale	Soundharyan	Soundharyan	
1991	Senbaga Thottam	Oh Vennila	Sirpy		-
1991	Sigaram	Agaram Ippo	S. P. Balasubrahmanyam	Vairamuthu	-
1991	Thalapathi	Kaattukuyile	Ilaiyaraaja		S. P. Balasubrahmanyam
1991	Thalapathi	Putham Puthu Poo	Ilaiyaraaja		S. Janaki
1991	Vaa Arugil Vaa	Maana Madhuraiyil Paarthen	Chanakya		-
1991	Vaasalil Oru Vennila	En Ooru Madura Pakkam	Deva	-	
1991	Vasanthakala Paravaigal	Pon Vaanil Meenuranga	Deva		-
1992	Aavarampoo	Manithiram Idhu	Ilaiyaraaja		-
1992	Amaran	Chandhirane Sooriyanne	Adithan	Viswa Guru	-
1992	Annaamalai	Oru Penn Puraa	Deva	Vairamuthu	-
1992	Chinna Thayee	Naan Erikkara Mel	Ilaiyaraaja	Vaali	Swarnalatha
1992	Gowri Manohari	Aruvi Kooda Jathillamal	Iniyavan		S. P. Balasubrahmanyam
1992	Hari Hara Puthiran	Moogambikaiye	Shankar–Ganesh		-
1992	Hari Hara Puthiran	Guruvayur Appane	Shankar–Ganesh		-
1992	Hari Hara Puthiran	Ayyappa Saamikku	Shankar–Ganesh		-
1992	Idhu Namma Bhoomi	Aaradi Suvaru thaan	Ilaiyaraaja	Vaali	Swarnalatha
1992	Idhu Namma Bhoomi	Vanna Maalai	Ilaiyaraaja	Vaali	-
1992	Kaviya Thalaivan (1992 film)	Santhana Malargalai	Aravind Siddharath	Aabavanan	-
1992	Kaviya Thalaivan (1992 film)	Vannakkil Vanna	Aravind Siddharath	Aabavanan	Swarnalatha
1992	Maanagara Kaaval	Thodi Raagam Paadava	Chandrabose	-	
1992	Maanagara Kaaval	Kaalai Neram	Chandrabose	-	
1992	Mannan	Amma Endru	Ilaiyaraaja	Vaali	-
1992	Meera	Pudhu Rottulathaan	Ilaiyaraaja	Vaali	K. S. Chithra
1992	Mudhal Kural	Aaduvom Paaduvom	Chandrabose		-
1992	Mudhal Kural	Unnai Thaan Azhaigiren	Chandrabose		-
1992	Mudhal Kural	Uyirai Thanthum	Chandrabose		-
1992	Naalai Engal Kalyanam	Odam	Ilaiyaraaja	Vaali	-
1992	Pattathu Raani	Pennaga Pirandhathoru	Deva	Kalidasan	S. Janaki
1992	Puthiya Swarangal	Oh Vaanamulla Kaalam	Ilaiyaraaja	Vaali	Uma Ramanan
1992	Senbaga Thottam	Oh Vennila	Sirpy		-
1992	Sooriya Namaskaaram	Adiye Pombala	Deva	Kalidasan	Swarnalatha
1992	Sugamana Sumaigal	Kudagu Malaikaadu	Chandrabose		-
1992	Thaali Kattiya Raasa	Adi Nichayathartham	S. A. Rajkumar		
1992	Thaali Kattiya Raasa	Unnai Oru Kelvi	S. A. Rajkumar		K. S. Chithra
1992	Thamizh Ponnu	Aathora Alamaram	Deva		
1992	Thamizh Ponnu	Saama	Deva		
1992	Unnai Vaazhthi Paadugiren	Oru Raagam	Ilaiyaraaja		S. Janaki
1992	Unnai Vaazhthi Paadugiren	Unnai Vaazhthi	Ilaiyaraaja		-
1992	Vanna Vanna Pookkal	Chinna Mani Kovilile	Ilaiyaraaja	Vaali	-
1992	Vanna Vanna Pookkal	Ila Nenje Vaa	Ilaiyaraaja	Vaali	-
1993	Athma	Kannale Kaadhal Kavithai	Ilaiyaraaja	Vaali	S. Janaki
1993	Dasarathan	Aaraaro Aariraro	L. Vaidyanathan		S. P. Balasubrahmanyam
1993	Dasarathan	Iyappaa Iyappaa	L. Vaidyanathan		-
1993	Dhool Parakuthu	"	M. S. Viswanathan		-
1993	En Idhaya Rani	Kaalai Malarandhathu Nalla	S. S. Vikraman	S. S. Vikraman	-
1993	Enga Muthalali	Kungumam Manjalukku	Ilaiyaraaja		S. Janaki
1993	Iniya Raja	Noolil Aadum Bommai	V. S. Narasimhan		-
1993	Kalaignan	Enthan Nenjil Neengatha	Ilaiyaraaja	Vaali	S. Janaki
1993	Kattabomman	Koondai Vittu Viliyil	Deva	Kalidasan	P. Suseela
1993	Kilipetchu Ketkava	Anbe Vaa Arugile	Ilaiyaraaja		-
1993	Maamiyar Veedu	Ennai Thodarendhu	Ilaiyaraaja	Vaali	S. Janaki
1993	Malare Kurinji Malare	Vaa Ilayavale	Raveendran		K. S. Chithra
1993	Marupadiyum	Ellorukkum Nalla Kaalam	Ilaiyaraaja	Vaali	-
1993	Mudhal Paadal	Poove Pudhu Kaatrin Geetham	S. A. Rajkumar		-
1993	Naan Pesa Ninaipathellam	Yalelan Kiliye Ennai -Solo	Sirpy		-
1993	Pettredutha Pillai	"	T. Rajendar	T. Rajendar	
1993	Poove Pon Poove	Solai Poonthendralil	Ilaiyaraaja		-
1993	Poove Pon Poove	Snegithanin	Ilaiyaraaja		-
1993	Pudhu Vayal	Naan Thedum Bandham	Aravind	Pulamaipithan	-
1993	Pullaanaalum Ponjaathi	Devaloga Rambaiyo	Sirpy		S. P. Balasubrahmanyam
1993	Sabash Babu	Maane Marikozhundhe	T. Rajendar	T. Rajendar	-
1993	Uzhavan	Raakozhi Rendu	A. R. Rahman	Vaali	Swarnalatha
1993	Uzhavan	Ennatha Ponnatha	A. R. Rahman	Vaali	K. S. Chithra
1994	Duet	Vennilavin Theril	A. R. Rahman	Vaali	-
1994	Namma Annachi	Ooru Sanadha Ootty	Deva		-
1994	Puthupatti Ponnuthaaye	Irukki Idikkum	Ilaiyaraaja		-
1994	Puthupatti Ponnuthaaye	Irukki Kidakkum	Ilaiyaraaja		-
1994	Rajakumaran	Chinna Chinna Sol Eduthu	Ilaiyaraaja	R. V. Udayakumar	S. Janaki
1994	Sadhu	Ammamma Unnai	Ilaiyaraaja	Vaali	-
1994	Sethupathi IPS	Vanna Mozhi Maane	Ilaiyaraaja	Vaali	-
1994	Sindhu Nathi Poo	Adi Aathi Vadaiyila	Soundaryan	Vairamuthu	Asha Latha
1994	Ungal Anbu Thangachi	Kaditham Ezhuthi	Chandrabose		-
1994	Ungal Anbu Thangachi	Yen Edharku	Chandrabose		-
1994	Veetla Visheshanga	Malare Thendral Paadum	Ilaiyaraaja		-
1995	Agaya Pookkal	Kuku Kuku Kuyile	Deva		-
1995	Apoorva Nanbargal	Sirithaan Inikkum		Poovai Senguttuvan	-
1995	Baashha	Thanga Magan Indru	Deva	Vairamuthu	K. S. Chithra
1995	Mannukku Mariyadhai	Aalamaram Polirundha	Devedevan		-
1995	Mayabazar	Adadaa Ingu	Ilaiyaraaja	Panju Arunachalam	-
1995	Mudhal Udhayam	Unakku Naan Paadum	Shankar–Ganesh	Muthulingam	-
1995	Mogamul	Kamalam Paadha Kamalam	Ilaiyaraaja	Vaali	-
1995	Mogamul	Sangeetha	Ilaiyaraaja	Vaali	-
1995	Paattu Vaathiyar	Muthamendral Enna	Ilaiyaraaja		Sujatha Mohan
1995	Paattu Vaathiyar	Neethaane Naalthorum (Duet)	Ilaiyaraaja		Swarnalatha
1995	Paattu Vaathiyar	Neethane Naal - (Male)	Ilaiyaraaja		-
1995	Paattu Vaathiyar	Oh Maari Poo Maari	Ilaiyaraaja		Minmini
1995	Paattu Vaathiyar	Sangeedhatha Valarkevenaam	Ilaiyaraaja		-
1995	Paattu Vaathiyar	Solai Malare Nenjai	Ilaiyaraaja		-
1995	Paattu Vaathiyar	Paadura	Ilaiyaraaja		-
1995	Periya Kudumbam	Raththatha	Ilaiyaraaja	Vaali	-
1995	Thotta Chinungi	Ilangtherndrale Pesum	Philip Jerry		-
1996	Devaraagam	Karu Vanna Vandugal	M. M. Keeravani		-
1996	Indian	Pachai Kiligal Tholodu	A. R. Rahman	Vaali	-
1996	Minor Mappillai	Isai Pole Kalai	Saivanan		-
1997	Bharathi Kannamma	Poongatre Poongatre	Deva		-
1997	Kadhalukku Mariyadhai	Oru Pattampoochi	Ilaiyaraaja		Sujatha Mohan
1997	Ottam	Poonthendrale	A. R. Rahman	Palani Bharathi	Sujatha Mohan
1997	Penn Manasu	Paadhas Maranam	Johnson		
1997	Penn Manasu	Vennila Vaanile	Johnson		
1997	Penn Manasu	Penne Un Kangal	Johnson		
1997	Ratchagan	Nenje Nenje Maranthu	A. R. Rahman	Vairamuthu	Sadhana Sargam
1998	Desiya Geetham	Desiya Geetham	Ilaiyaraaja		
1998	Ponmanam	Nilavodum	S. A. Rajkumar	Ilandevan	-
1999	Kallazhagar	Chinna Vayasula	Deva		-

=== 2000s ===
==== 2000 ====
Film	Song	Composer(s)	Writer(s)	Co-artist(s)
Bharathi	Agni Kunjondru	Ilaiyaraaja	Subramania Bharathi	-
Bharathi	Bharatha Samudhayam	Ilaiyaraaja	Subramania Bharathi	-
Chinna Ramasamy Periya Ramasamy	Vaazhaiyadi Vaazhaiyaa	Ilaiyaraaja	R. V. Udayakumar	Arunmozhi
Kandukondain Kandukondain	Kannamoochi Yenadaa (duet)	A. R. Rahman	Vairamuthu	K. S. Chithra
Kannukkul Nilavu	Iravu Pagalai Theda	Ilaiyaraaja		-
Kannukkul Nilavu	Oru Naal Oru Kanavu (Duet)	Ilaiyaraaja		Anuradha Sriram
Kannukkul Nilavu	Oru Naal Oru Kanavu (Male)	Ilaiyaraaja		-

==== 2001 ====
Year	Film	Song	Composer(s)	Writer(s)	Co-artist(s)
Aanandham	Aasai Aasaiyai	S. A. Rajkumar			
En Iniya Pon Nilave	Kaadhal Ninaive	Ilaiyaraaja/M. S. Viswanathan		-	
Poovellam Un Vasam	Kaadhal Vandhathu	Vidyasagar		Sadhana Sargam	
Sonnal Thaan Kaadhala	Rosaappoove	Vijaya T. Rajendar	Vijaya T. Rajendar	Balesh	
Thavasi	Thanthana Thanthana Thai	Vidyasagar		Sadhana Sargam	
Vaanchinathan	Rojaa Vanna Rojaa	Karthik Raja		-	

Film	Song	Composer(s)	Writer(s)	Co-artist(s)	
2002	En Mana Vaanil	Rottoram Paattu	Ilaiyaraaja		Shruti Haasan
2003	Julie Ganapathi	Minmini Paarvaigal	Ilaiyaraaja		-
2003	Pithamagan	Aadaa Agangaraa Arakka	Ilaiyaraaja		-
2004	Desam	Thaai Sonna Thaalaattu	A. R. Rahman	Vaali	Madhushree
2005	Raam	Aarariraroo Naan	Yuvan Shankar Raja		-
2005	Raam	Manidhan Solkindra	Yuvan Shankar Raja		Vijay Yesudas, Ranjith
2005	Raam	Nizhalinai Nijamum	Yuvan Shankar Raja		Yuvan Shankar Raja
2006	Adhipathi	Vaa Vaa Vaanampadi	Chandrabose		Vanitha
2006	E	Vaaraathu Pol	Srikanth Deva		-
2006	Thanneerile Thaamarai Poo	Unnai Kandu	V. Thayanban		-
2007	Mirugam	Pethava Kooda Pathu	Sabesh–Murali		-
2007	Nam Naadu	Kaadhal Ennum	Srikanth Deva		Murali
2007	Periyar	Thaayum Yaaro Thandhaiyum	Vidyasagar	Vairamuthu	-
2008	Ayyavazhi	Vaigunda Natha	Bhagavathi Sivanesan		-
2009	Pazhassi Raja	Mathangananambajavasa (Slokam)	Ilaiyaraaja	Vaali	
2009	Vedigundu Murugesan	Neenda Thooram	Dhina		Dhina

=== 2010s ===
Year	Movie	Song	Music	Lyrics	Co - Singer
2010	Nandalala	Onnukkonnu Thunai	Ilaiyaraaja	Mu. Metha	-
2011	Aayiram Vilakku	Enna Thavam Seithen	Srikanth Deva		-
2011	Aayiram Vilakku	Uthma Puthirane	Srikanth Deva		-
2012	Kai Thunindhavan	Kanne Kanne	Ishaan Dev		-
2012	Medhai	Amma Nee Irundhaal	Dhina		Saindhavi
2013	Moodar Koodam	Neeyum Bommai Naanum	Natarajan Sankaran		-
2013	Thalaivan	Oru Kodi	Vidyasagar		-
2014	Azhagin Bommi	Thozha Thozha	Bhavatharini		-
2014	Kaththi	Nee Yaaro	Anirudh Ravichander	Pa. Vijay	Anirudh Ravichander
2014	Nathigal Nanaivathillai	Unnai Nethu Rathiri	Soundharyan	Pulamaipithan	Rita
2014	Nathigal Nanaivathillai	Jeevan Ulla podhe	Soundharyan	Pulamaipithan	Saindhavi
2014	Sigaram Thodu	Anbulla Appa	D. Imman		-
2018	Keni	Ayya Saamy	M. Jayachandran	B. K. Harinarayanan, Pazhani	S. P. Balasubrahmanyam

=== 2020s ===
Year	Movie	Song	Music	Lyrics	Co - Singer
2022	Jothi	Yaar Seidha Paavamo	Harshavardhan Rameshwar	Karthik Netha	
2022	Tamilarasan	Poruthathu Podhum	Ilayaraja		

== Television ==
Year	Movie	Song	Music	Lyrics	Co - Singer
1989	Rail Sneham	"Rail Sneham", "Indha Veenaikku Theriyadhu"	V. S. Narasimhan		

== See also ==
- Dr. K. J. Yesudas
- K. J. Yesudas discography
- Chembai discography
