= Ellorum Nallavare =

- Theatrical release poster
- Directed by: S. S. Balan
- Screenplay by: Siddalingaiah
- Story by: Gorur Ramasawamy Iyengar
- Produced by: S. S. Balan
- Starring: R. Muthuraman; Manjula Vijayakumar; Jayanthi
- Music by: V. Kumar (Tamil/Telugu); Ravindra Jain (Hindi)
- Production company: Gemini Studios
- Release date: 11 April 1975
- Country: India
- Languages: Tamil; Telugu; Hindi

Ellorum Nallavare (transl. All people are good) is a 1975 Indian Tamil-language film, directed and produced by S. S. Balan under Gemini Studios. A remake of the 1974 Kannada film Bhootayyana Maga Ayyu, it was simultaneously produced in Telugu and Hindi languages as Andaroo Manchivare (transl. Everyone is good) and Ek Gaon Ki Kahani (transl. The story of a village). Except for the Telugu version, it emerged a box-office bomb. Gemini did not produce another film until 1985 which became Janani.

== Plot ==
The storyline includes characters like a greedy moneylender and his repentant son, a good Samaritan, who is a victim of the unscrupulous moneylender, his son, the enmity that springs up, romance thrown in for good measure, the fury unleashed by a remorseless nature, and the terrible wages that evil earns.

== Cast ==
Cast (Tamil)	Cast (Telugu)	Cast (Hindi)	Role
R. Muthuraman	Sobhan Babu	Rakesh Pandey	
Lokesh			
Manjula			
Jayanthi		Jayshree Gadkar	

Tamil

- V. S. Raghavan
- Major Sundarrajan as Dharmalinga

Telugu

- Dhulipala as Venkayya
- Tyagaraju
- KV Chalam
- Nirmala

Hindi

- Jeevan
- C. S. Dubey
- Mohan Choti
- Birbal
- Brahmachari
- Nasir Hussain

== Production ==
Ellorum Nallavare was produced and directed by S. S. Balan under the Gemini Studios banner. It was a trilingual, produced in Tamil, Telugu and Hindi languages. The Telugu version was titled Andaroo Manchivare, and the Hindi version was titled Ek Gaon Ki Kahani. The film was entirely shot at Kalasapura village, they built house sets there specifically for the film.

== Soundtrack ==
The soundtrack was composed by V. Kumar.

Song	Singer(s)	Lyrics
"Sivappukkal"	T. M. Soundararajan	Pulamaipithan
"Sivappukkal"	P. Susheela	Pulamaipithan
"Padaithaane Bramma Devan"	S. P. Balasubramaniyan	Pulamaipithan
"Yamma Kannu"	S. P. Balasubramaniyan	Pulamaipithan
"Pagai Konda Ullam"	K. J. Yesudas	Pulamaipithan

== Reception ==
Kanthan of Kalki appreciated the performances of the cast and crew particularly appreciating cinematography for the flood scene and concluded that the film's producer and director S. S. Balan reminds of S. S. Vasan and called it an exciting colour film. Despite this, it was a box-office bomb. Ek Gaon Ki Kahani too did not succeed, but the Telugu version did.

== Bibliography ==
- Rajadhyaksha, Ashish; Willemen, Paul (1998) [1994]. Encyclopaedia of Indian Cinema. British Film Institute and Oxford University Press. ISBN 0-19-563579-5.
