= Aditi Sharma =

Aditi Sharma may refer to:

- Aditi Sharma (actress, born 1983), Indian television and film actress
- Aditi Singh Sharma (born 1986), Indian playback singer
- Aditi Sharma (actress, born 1996), Indian television actress and model
- Aditi Sharma (cricketer) (born 1996), Indian cricketer

== See also ==
- Aditi (disambiguation)
