= Aditi (given name) =

Aditi is a female given name in India. Aditi may refer to:

== Fictional characters ==
- Aditi, mother of gods, according to the Vedas

== People ==
- Aditi Ashok, Indian professional golfer
- Aditi Avasthi, Indian entrepreneur
- Aditi Arya, Indian actor, model, research analyst and beauty pageant
- Aditi Balan, Indian film actress
- Aditi Banerjee, practicing attorney
- Aditi Bhagwat, Indian classical dancer
- Aditi Bhatia, Indian television actress
- Aditi Chauhan, Indian women's professional footballer
- Aditi Chengappa, Indian actress mostly appearing in Telugu cinema
- Aditi Gupta, Indian author
- Aditi Govitrikar, Indian model
- Aditi Kapil, playwright of Bulgarian and Indian descent
- Aditi Khorana, Indian American author
- Aditi Kinkhabwala, American sports reporter
- Aditi Lahiri, India-born German linguist
- Aditi Mangaldas, Indian classical dancer
- Aditi Mittal, Indian stand-up comedian, actress and writer
- Aditi Mohsin, Bangladeshi singer
- Aditi Mutatkar, Indian badminton player
- Aditi Pant, Indian oceanographer
- Aditi Phadnis, Indian political writer
- Aditi Prabhudeva, Indian film and television actress
- Aditi Pratap, Indian television actress
- Aditi Ramesh, Indian singer songwriter
- Aditi Rao, Indian activist
- Aditi Rao Hydari, Indian actress
- Aditi Rathore, Indian television actress
- Aditi Ravi, Indian model and actress
- Aditi Sajwan, Indian television actress
- Aditi Sarangdhar, Indian Marathi actress
- Aditi Sharma, Indian actress
- Aditi Sharma, Indian cricketer
- Aditi Shankardass, British neuroscientist
- Aditi Singh, Indian film actress
- Aditi Singh Rana, Indian shooter
- Aditi Singh Sharma, Indian playback singer
- Aditi Soondarsingh, chess player
- Aditi Vasudev, Indian film actress
- Aditi Sanwal Indian actress
