= Chandraditya =

Chandraditya (IAST: Candrāditya) may refer to:

- Chandraditya (Gupta dynasty) alias Vishnugupta, r. c. mid 6th century CE, a king of northern India
- Chandraditya (Gahadavala dynasty) alias Chandradeva, r. c. 1089–1103 CE, a king of northern India
- Chandraditya (Chalukya dynasty), r. c. 646-649 CE, a king of southern India

== See also ==
- Chandra (disambiguation)
- Aditya (disambiguation)
