= Aditya =

Aditya may refer to:

- Ādityas, a group of Hindu deities
- An alternative name for Surya, the Sun in later Hinduism
- Aditya (name), an Indian male given name
  - Aditya (actor) (born 1978), Indian film producer and actor
- Aditya (boat), solar-powered ferry
- Aditya (spacecraft), an Indian solar research spacecraft
- ADITYA (tokamak), a tokamak fusion experiment

== See also ==
- Aditi (disambiguation)
- Adhitya, alternative form of the Indian male given name
- Adithyan, Indian composer
- Adithan, Indian surname
- Aditha Karikalan, 10th century Indian prince
- Adithya Varma, a 2019 Indian film by Gireesaaya
