= Baladitya =

Baladitya may refer to:

- Baladitya (actor) (active from 1991), Indian actor in Telugu cinema
- Narasimhagupta, 5th-century emperor of the Gupta dynasty in India
- Dhruvasena II Balāditya, 7th-century ruler of the Maitraka dynasty in western India

== See also ==
- Bala (disambiguation)
- Aditya (disambiguation)
