= Aditi (disambiguation) =

Aditi is a Vedic goddess in Hinduism, the personification of the infinite.

Aditi may also refer to:

== People ==
- Aditi (given name)
- Aditi Arya, Indian actress, born 1993
- Aditi Bhatia, Indian actress and model, born 1999
- Aditi Govitrikar, Indian model, actress and a doctor, born 1976
- Aditi Kapil, American playwright
- Aditi Jaltare, Indian child actress, born 2010
- Aditi Prabhudeva, Indian film actress
- Aditi Rao Hydari, Indian actress, dancer and singer, born 1983
- Aditi Rathore, Indian television actress
- Aditi Sajwan, Indian television actress, born 1992
- Aditi Sharma (actress, born 1983), Indian film and TV actress
- Aditi Sharma (actress, born 1996), Indian television actress
- Aditi Sharma (cricketer), Indian cricketer
- Aditi Singh Sharma, Indian playback singer
- Aditi Sanwal Indian actress

== Others ==
- Captain Aditi Nahta, fictional Indian spy in the 2019 Indian film War, portrayed by Anupriya Goenka

== See also ==
- Aditya (disambiguation)
