= GK (art director) =

Indian film art director

- Born: Gopi Kanth; 1957
- Died: 20 September 2017 (age 60); Chennai, India
- Occupations: art director, production designer
- Years active: 1985–2017

GK (1957 – 20 September 2017) was an Indian art director who worked predominantly in the Tamil film industry. He also worked as actor in films and television series.

== Career ==
GK held a diploma in Fine Arts from the Madras College of Arts and Crafts. He received his first opportunity as an art director in Netaji's 1985 film, Janani. GK went on to work on over 200 Tamil films as an art director during his career. He won the Tamil Nadu State Film Award for Best Art Director award for his work in Sundar C's Arunachalam (1997). In a notable moment during the making of the film, GK quickly prepared a Lingam prop from a water pot when filming the "Adhandha Idhandha" song featuring Rajinikanth. He also worked on the sets of Kamal Haasan's Marudhanayagam in 1998.

His acting career included antagonistic dual roles in the television serial, Thangam, which ran between 2009 and 2013.

== Death ==
He died aged 60 on 20 September 2017 at Apollo Hospitals in Chennai following heart ailments. He was survived by his wife Nageshwari, son Krishnakanth and daughter Hema.

== Partial filmography ==
=== As art director ===
- Avvai Shanmughi (1996)
- Arunachalam (1997)
- Usire (2001; Kannada)
- H2O (2002; Kannada)
- Super Star (2002; Kannada)
- Baba (2002)
- Thirupaachi (2005)
- Chandramukhi (2005)
- Sivakasi (2005)
- Puli Vesham (2011)
- Puthagam (2013)

=== As actor ===
Television

- Kalasam (2008-2009)
- Thangam (2009-2013)
- Ganga (2017-2018)

Films

- Sami Potta Mudichu (1991)
- Arunachalam (1997) as film producer
