= Ilangeswaran (film) =

- Title card
- Directed by: T. R. Ramanna
- Written by: Thuraiyur K. Murthy
- Based on: Ilangeswaran by Thuraiyur K. Murthy
- Produced by: K. Muniratnam
- Starring: K. R. Vijaya; Rajesh
- Cinematography: H. S. Venu
- Edited by: Kandasami; T. R. Srinivasulu
- Music by: M. S. Viswanathan
- Production company: Sri Sivakami Productions
- Release date: 21 March 1987
- Country: India
- Language: Tamil

Ilangeswaran (also spelt Elangeswaran) is a 1987 Indian Tamil-language Hindu mythological film directed by T. R. Ramanna and written by Thuraiyur K. Murthy. It is based on the play of the same name by Murthy, itself a reimagining of the Indian epic Ramayana from the perspective of its antagonist Ravana. The film stars K. R. Vijaya and Rajesh (as the title character), with Revathi, Srividya and Sripriya in supporting roles. It was released on 21 March 1987.

== Cast ==
- K. R. Vijaya as Mandodari
- Rajesh as Ilangeswaran
- Revathi as Sita
- Srividya
- Sripriya as Shurpanakha

== Soundtrack ==
The music was composed by M. S. Viswanathan, with lyrics by Vaali.

Track listing
| No. | Title | Singer(s) | Length |
|---|---|---|---|
| 1. | "Padhathi Kesam" | P. Jayachandran, S. Janaki |
| 2. | "Thirumalamugan" | S. Janaki |
| 3. | "Sangeetham En" | K. J. Yesudas, K. S. Chithra |
| 4. | "Malligai Malaroduthu" | Vani Jairam |
| 5. | "Thandavam Podhumayya" | K. J. Yesudas |
| 6. | "Paasam Enbathu" | M. S. Viswanathan |

== Release and reception ==
Ilangeswaran was released on 21 March 1987. N. Krishnaswamy of The Indian Express wrote, "If Ilankeswaran is dull, it is because the Rama story gets neither epic or lyrical treatment". He concluded, "The mythological all but died with A. P. Nagarajan, but could do without a sham resurrection that has turned out to be the last rusted nail in its coffin".
