= Vijay Krishnaraj =

Indian Actor, Writer & Director

- Other names: Krishnaraj, R Krishnan
- Occupations: Film Actor, Film Maker, Story Writer, Television Actor
- Years active: 1979 – present
- Notable work: Rosappu Ravikkaikari, Kalthoon, Ranuva Veeran, Rajathi Rojakili, Madurai Veeran Enga Saami, Annan Ennada Thambi Ennada
- Television: Bommalattam, Parijatham, Lakshmi Vandhachu, Pandavar Illam, Rekka Katti Parakkudhu Manasu, Kairasi Kudumbam

Vijay Krishnaraj, also known as R Krishnan, is an Indian actor, writer, director, who is working in Tamil Films and Television industry. He made his debut in Tamil cinema as story writer and dialogue writer of Rosappu Ravikkaikari film in 1979. He made his acting debut in the Tamil film Rajathi Rojakili along with Sulakshana, directed by S. Devarajan. He has acted over 100 films.

== Film career ==
He was born in Tiruchengode, Namakkal District, Tamil Nadu. He started his career as story writer in the film Rosappu Ravikkaikari. His notable movie for his story and dialogue such as Rosappu Ravikkaikari, Kalthoon and Ranuva Veeran. Later, he has acted as supporting role in Rajathi Rojakili in 1985. He has written screenplay six films for Veteran Telugu film director Ragavendara Rao. His some well known films such Aavathum Pennale Azhivathum Pennale, Kaalaiyum Neeye Maalaiyum Neeye, Poonthotta Kaavalkaaran, Sandhana Kaatru, Vaanmathi, Vaimaye Vellum. His performances in many films were lauded especially in Annan Ennada Thambi Ennada.

== Television career ==
In the early 2000s gradually he moved to act in television series in Tamil. Currently, he is doing many Tamil serials. His serials list are below:

Year	Serial	Role	Channel
1999–2000	Kudumbam		Sun TV
2001–2002	Gopuram		Sun TV
2001–2003	Varam		Sun TV
2002–2006	Nagamma (Telugu)	Rayudu's son	Gemini TV
2003–2009	Anandham		Sun TV
2010	Poovilangu	also Director	Vijay TV
2011–2012	Parijatham		Vijay TV
2012–2013	Pillai Nila		Sun TV
2012–2013	Amudha Oru Aacharyakuri		Kalaignar TV
2012–2016	Bommalattam	Dhandapani	Sun TV
2015–2017	Lakshmi Vandhachu	Natamai Nachimuthu	Vijay TV
2015–2017	Kairasi Kudumbam		Jaya TV
2017	Ganga		Sun TV
2017–2018	Rekka Katti Parakkudhu Manasu		Zee Tamil
2017–2018	Mullum Malarum		Zee Tamil
2018–2020	Ponmagal Vanthal	Shanmugam	Star Vijay
2019	Chandrakumari	Manickam	Sun TV
2019–2023	Pandavar Illam	Velan	Sun TV
2019–2020	Gokulathil Seethai	Krishnamoorthy	Zee Tamil
2020	Chandralekha	Manickam	Sun TV
2021–2022	Pudhu Pudhu Arthangal	Natarajan	Zee Tamil
2022	Sevanthi		Sun TV

== Filmography ==
As actor

Year	Film	Role	Notes
1985	Rajathi Rojakili	Seenu Thevar	
1986	Thaaiku Oru Thaalaattu	Pakkiri	
1988	Kaalaiyum Neeye Maalaiyum Neeye		
1988	Poonthotta Kaavalkaaran		
1989	Ninaivu Chinnam		
1989	Dharmam Vellum	Vishwanath	
1990	Vaazhkai Chakkaram		
1990	Pulan Visaranai		
1990	Sandhana Kaatru		
1990	Velai Kidaichuduchu		
1990	Madurai Veeran Enga Saami		
1992	Annan Ennada Thambi Ennada		
1993	Madurai Meenakshi		
1993	Ezhai Jaathi		
1994	Vandicholai Chinraasu		
1994	Magudikkaran		
1995	Chellakannu		
1996	Vaanmathi		
1996	Aavathum Pennale Azhivathum Pennale		
1997	Rettai Jadai Vayasu		
1997	Kalyana Vaibhogam		
1997	Vaimaye Vellum		
1997	Ratchagan		
1998	Bhagavath Singh		
2000	Thai Poranthachu		
2000	Vallarasu		
2000	Ninaivellam Nee		
2001	Engalukkum Kaalam Varum		
2002	Game		
2003	Parasuram		
2003	Anjaneya		
2003	Thirumalai		
2004	Kuthu		
2004	Arasatchi		
2005	Jithan		
2006	Kovai Brothers		
2006	Ilakkanam		
2007	Pirappu		
2007	Periyar		
2008	Pattaya Kelappu		
2008	Thithikkum Ilamai		
2008	Kodaikanal		
2008	Vaitheeswaran		
2009	Nesi		
2010	Sivappu Mazhai		
2018	Onaaigal Jakkiradhai	Anjali's father	
2019	Azhiyatha Kolangal 2	Politician	

As screenwriter

Year	Film	Writer	Notes
1979	Rosappu Ravikkaikari	Screenplay	Credited as Krishna
1980	Oru Velladu Vengaiyagiradhu	Story, dialogue	
1981	Kalthoon	Story	
1981	Ranuva Veeran	Dialogue	
1982	Nenjangal	Dialogue	
1982	Oorum Uravum	Dialogue	Credited as Krishna
1985	Rajathi Rojakili	Dialogue	
1986	Thaaiku Oru Thaalaattu	Dialogue	

As director

Year	Film	Cast	Notes
1982	Kannodu Kan	Ravikumar, Sulakshana	Debut as director
1984	Simma Soppanam	Sivaji Ganesan, K. R. Vijaya, Prabhu, Radha	
1985	Thiramai	Sathyaraj, Revathi	
1987	Vaazhga Valarga	Radha Ravi	
1992	Annan Ennada Thambi Ennada	Sivakumar, Arjun	
1994	Thaatboot Thanjavur	Babu Ganesh, Subhashri	

As dubbing artist

Year	Film	Actor	Notes
2003	Paarai	Vijayan	
2003	Diwan	Vijayan	
