= Annan Ennada Thambi Ennada =

- Poster
- Directed by: Vijay Krishnaraj
- Written by: Vijay Krishnaraj
- Produced by: Poovarasan
- Starring: Sivakumar; Arjun; Nirosha; Rekha
- Cinematography: Rajaraman
- Edited by: Srinivas Krishna
- Music by: Gyan Varma
- Production company: Sree Athanoor Amman Pictures
- Release date: 25 September 1992
- Running time: 120 minutes
- Country: India
- Language: Tamil

Annan Ennada Thambi Ennada (transl. What is an elder brother? What is a younger brother?) is a 1992 Indian Tamil-language action drama film directed by Vijay Krishnaraj. The film stars Sivakumar, Arjun, Nirosha and Rekha. It was released on 25 September 1992, and was a box office failure. The film's title is based off a song from Pazhani (1965).

== Cast ==
- Sivakumar as Rakkaiya Gounder
- Arjun as Shankar
- Vijay Krishnaraj as Ponnar
- K. R. Vijaya as Bhavana
- Nirosha
- Rekha
- Manorama
- S. S. Chandran
- Senthil
- Senthamarai
- Vennira Aadai Moorthy
- Sabitha Anand
- T. P. Gajendran

== Soundtrack ==
The soundtrack was composed by Gyan Varma. The lyrics were written by Aabavanan.

Song	Singer(s)
"Iravu Nadagam"	Jamuna Rani, Jikki
"Papparappa"	T. M. S. Balraj
"Chinna Chinna"	B. S. Sasirekha, Vidya
"Uchi Malayile"	T. M. S. Balraj
"Naan Yenna Solli"	B. S. Sasirekha, K. R. Vijaya
"Aasai Mela Aasai"	B. S. Sasirekha, A. Hariharan
"Akka Pasanga"	T. M. S. Balraj, T. L. Maharajan
