= Simma Soppanam =

- Poster
- Directed by: Vijay Krishnaraj; S. S. Karuppa Sami
- Written by: Vijay Krishnaraj; S. S. Karuppa Sami
- Produced by: S. S. Karuppa Sami
- Starring: Sivaji Ganesan; K. R. Vijaya; Prabhu; Radha
- Cinematography: P. N. Sundaram
- Edited by: R. Devarajan
- Music by: K. V. Mahadevan
- Production company: S. S. K. Films
- Release date: 30 June 1984
- Country: India
- Language: Tamil

Simma Soppanam (transl. The terror) is a 1984 Indian Tamil-language film, directed by Vijay Krishnaraj and produced by S. S. Karuppa Sami. The film stars Sivaji Ganesan, K. R. Vijaya, Prabhu and Radha. It was released on 30 June 1984.

== Plot ==
The hero played by Shivaji Ganesan is a staunch communist hotshot labour lawyer who brings corrupt evil industrialist to their knees. He spends his time organising union activities. He, however, gets betrayed by his number 2, played by Major Sundarajan who wants the position and power to be his. He also loses is hand in the process, becomes disillusioned and quits fighting for them. His son, played by Prabhu, also a lawyer gives the romantic angle. Incidentally, both father and son are pulled back by the atrocities committed by the industrialists on the labourer's eventually killing them.

== Cast ==
- Sivaji Ganesan as (GK) P.Karthikeyan
- K. R. Vijaya as Karpagam GK's Wife
- Prabhu as Vijay
- Radha as Ganga
- M. N. Nambiar as Nagarajan
- Radha Ravi as Naresh
- Saritha as Leela Junior of GK
- Major Sundarrajan as Kanmani Labour Union Leader
- V. K. Ramasamy as Nagarajan's lawyer
- V.Gopalakrishnan as Opposite lawyer
- Kallapetti Singaram
- Vennira Aadai Moorthy
- Rajesh as Labour Leader
- Anuradha as Nandini
- Loose Mohan
- V. S. Raghavan
- Manorama

== Soundtrack ==
The music was composed by K. V. Mahadevan. Lyrics were written by Vaali.

Track listing
No.	Title	Singer(s)	Length
1.	"Oothakkathum Oosi Mazhaiyum"	Malaysia Vasudevan, S. Janaki	4:12
2.	"Pudavai Kattikkondu"	T. M. Soundararajan, Vani Jairam	4:16
3.	"Onnayirunthathu"	T. M. Soundararajan	3:55
4.	"Raavappakala"	P. Susheela	4:08
5.	"Simma Soppanam"	Sirkazhi Govindarajan	3:15
6.	"Kathavu Ille"	S. P. Balasubrahmanyam, S. Janaki	4:32
Total length:			24:18
