= Ranuva Veeran =

- Theatrical release poster
- Directed by: S. P. Muthuraman
- Written by: Vijay Krishnaraj (dialogues)
- Screenplay by: Sathya Movies story department
- Story by: Radha Veerannan; S. Jagadessan; Krishna; Thamizhagan
- Produced by: R. M. Veerappan; G. Thyagarajan
- Starring: Rajinikanth; Chiranjeevi; Sridevi
- Cinematography: Babu
- Edited by: R. Vittal
- Music by: M. S. Viswanathan
- Production company: Sathya Movies
- Release date: 26 October 1981
- Running time: 152 minutes
- Country: India
- Language: Tamil

Ranuva Veeran (transl. Soldier) is a 1981 Indian Tamil-language action film directed by S. P. Muthuraman, starring Rajinikanth, Sridevi and Chiranjeevi. It was released on 27 October 1981 on the occasion of Diwali. The film was later dubbed in Hindi as Zulm Ki Zanjeer. Despite starring two popular heroes from Tamil and Telugu cinema, Ranuva Veeran became a box office failure.

== Plot ==
The film opens with Chiranjeevi's character being chased and caught by a group of policemen, but he escapes. Meanwhile, a young soldier Raghu returns to his village, which is known for frequent thefts and murders perpetrated by the mysterious "One-Eyed Man" Chiranjeevi and his gang of thieves. Raghu soon meets Chiranjeevi; the two were once college roommates, but they had since separated. In addition to Chiranjeevi, Raghu reunites with his father, an Orthodox Iyengar who always condemns him, and he finds out that his sister eloped with a man few years before, which he later finds out was none other than the gang leader of the thieves himself, Chiranjeevi. In the end, Chiranjeevi gets shot by his own son.

== Cast ==
- Rajinikanth as Raghu
- Chiranjeevi as The thief
- Sridevi as Raghu's love interest
- Poornam Viswanathan as Raghu's father
- Nalini as Mythili
- C. Vasanthi as Raghu's Mother
- J. Lalitha as Raghu's sister
- K. Natraj
- Mafia Sasi
- G. Srinivasan
- MLA Thangaraj
- R. Parthiban in an uncredited role

== Production ==
Producer R. M. Veerappan wrote this script keeping M. G. Ramachandran in mind, but since he was involved with politics, Rajinikanth was chosen instead. Chiranjeevi, who went on to become a megastar and Rajinikanth's counterpart in Telugu cinema acted in a negative role.

== Soundtrack ==
Soundtrack was composed by M. S. Viswanathan and lyrics were written by Pulamaipithan.

Track listing
No.	Title	Lyrics	Singer(s)	Length
1.	"Malligai Poo"	Muthulingam	Malaysia Vasudevan, Vijayaramani
2.	"Sonnalthane Theriyum"	Muthulingam	S. P. Balasubrahmanyam, S. P. Sailaja
3.	"Vaarungal"	Vaali	S. P. Balasubramanyam

== Release and reception ==
Ranuva Veeran was released on 27 October 1981 on the occasion of Diwali, along with six other movies, including Andha 7 Naatkal, Keezh Vaanam Sivakkum, Thanneer Thanneer and Tik Tik Tik, it became a box office failure. Nalini Sastry of Kalki praised Babu's cinematography as the film's main highlight while praising Sridevi's performance but felt Chiranjeevi and Thengai Srinivasan were underutilised. She concluded that the film was entertaining till interval then it became boring.
