= Uthami =

- Directed by: M. Vellaichami
- Screenplay by: A. L. Narayanan
- Produced by: J. Ravi
- Starring: Sujatha; Rajesh; Sangeeta
- Cinematography: J. P. Selvam
- Edited by: M. Vellaichami; R. Krishnamoorthy
- Music by: Shankar–Ganesh
- Production company: Maruthi Movie Arts
- Release date: 27 February 1985
- Country: India
- Language: Tamil

Uthami (transl. Perfect woman) is a 1985 Indian Tamil-language film directed by M. Vellaichami, starring Sujatha, Rajesh and Sangeeta. It was released on 27 February 1985.

== Plot ==
Sivashankar and Ganga are an unhappily married couple. He wants a traditional wife and she wants a more modern, easy-going husband. Sivashankar works for Paranthaman but doesn't realize that he's being used to smuggle diamonds by his boss. Paranthaman and Ganga meet at an office party and soon start an affair. When a heartbroken Sivashankar learns this, he attempts suicide by jumping out of a moving train. Unbeknownst to him, his jacket contains diamonds that Ganga hid at the behest of Paranthaman. Ganga receives a suicide letter from Sivashankar and, along with Paranthaman, works to recover the diamonds. They're unsuccessful and Ganga realizes that she cannot trust Paranthaman. She murders him and takes over his diamond smuggling ring.

Meanwhile, Sivashankar is rescued by Gayathri after his suicide attempt. He sees this as a new lease on life and lives his life as Sivaram. He soon marries Gayathri and leads a happy life with her and their son Raja. Inspired by family friend Jaganath, Raja becomes a police officer. He's particularly focused on bringing in the notorious diamond smuggler known only as Madam. Raja's investigations draw him closer to Ganga, the mysterious Madam. Wary of this new, overzealous cop, Ganga has him investigated and learns that Sivashankar is still alive. She cultivates a friendship with Raja and slowly plants a seed of doubt against Sivaram/Sivashankar. Raja is soon convinced his father is guilty of murdering Sivashankar. Gayathri must unwind the threads of deception and secrecy to reunite her shattered family.

== Cast ==
- Sujatha – Gayathri
- Rajesh – Sivashankar/Sivaram
- Sangeeta – Ganga
- Ilavarasan – Raja
- Vijayan as Jaganath
- Veeraragavan
- Nizhalgal Ravi – Paranthaman

== Soundtrack ==
The soundtrack was composed by Shankar–Ganesh.

Track listing
| No. | Title | Singer(s) | Length |
|---|---|---|---|
| 1. | "Kalyana Mappillaiya Paaru" | Malaysia Vasudevan |
| 2. | "Anandha Raagam Alaimothum Neram" | Malaysia Vasudevan, Vani Jairam |
| 3. | "Happy Happy Happy Day" (Enge Raman Ange Seethai)" | S. P. Balasubrahmanyam |
| 4. | "Kaadhal Devan" | S. P. Balasubrahmanyam, Vani Jairam |

== Release and reception ==
Uthami was released on 27 February 1985. Jayamanmadhan of Kalki praised the performances of Sujatha, Rajesh and Ilavarasan and Shankar–Ganesh's music.
