= Rajathi Rojakili =

- Directed by: S. Devarajan
- Written by: Vijay Krishnaraj (dialogues)
- Story by: Rama Pandiyan
- Produced by: Rama Pandiyan; Chakrapani
- Starring: Rajesh; Suresh; Nalini; Sulakshana; Goundamani; Senthil
- Cinematography: Soman
- Edited by: R. Devarajan
- Music by: Chandrabose
- Production company: Niruma Creations
- Release date: 12 January 1985
- Running time: 137 minutes
- Language: Tamil

Rajathi Rojakili is a 1985 Indian Tamil-language horror film directed by S. Devarajan, starring Rajesh, Suresh, Nalini, Sulakshana, Goundamani, Manorama, and Senthil. Goundamani acted as the main antagonist. The film was released on 12 January 1985.

== Plot ==
The story begins with the life of Zamindar Velu Mayilu Thevar. The Zamindar's nephew is Soora Thevar, who is frustrated with the Zamindar's good deeds and kind actions and wants to take up all the wealth for himself. Along with his wife and assistant, he poisons Velu Thevar's food, thus leaving Velu's young son Surutaiyan without parental care. Soora Thevar becomes the guardian for Velu Thevar's wealth, until Surutaiyan grows up. Seenu Thevar, who used to work for Velu Thevar starts taking care of Surutaiyan, as he doesn't like Soora Thevar torturing Surutaiyan. Soora Thevar's plans work out and he sends his daughter to a convent, but Surutaiyan remains uneducated. Years later, his daughter now grown up is all educated and smart. Surutaiyan and Seenu Thevar now ask Soora Thevar to return Velu Thevar's wealth back to Surutaiyan as he is also grown up now. But after seeing the crocodile tears shed by Soora Thevar and family, he changes his mind and goes back. Surutaiyan falls in love with Seenu Thevar's daughter and Nalini falls in love with Suresh, her college mate. After a lot of family feuds and quarrels, Soora Thevar, along with his assistant, kills Surutaiyan and dumps his body in a well, making the villagers believe it was suicide. Meanwhile, Seenu Thevar, who realizes that Sulakshana is pregnant with Surutaiyan's child, confronts Soora Thevar in front of the whole village and states that Surutaiyan's child must be born in the ancestral house of his father, but gets insulted by Soora Thevar and sent out. One day, Surutaiyan's ghost returns to torment Soora Thevar, his family and his accomplices. How Surutaiyan's ghost avenges Soora Thevar forms the rest of the story.

== Cast ==
- Rajesh as Surutaiyan
- Suresh as Rani's husband
- Nalini as Rani
- Sulakshana as Rasaathi
- Goundamani as Soora Thevar
- Manorama as Kaluvaaiyi
- Vijay Krishnaraj as Seenu Thevar
- Senthil as Patta Sombu
- Anuradha (special appearance in the song "Vaazha Pazhuthirukku")
- Kamila Prasad Babu as child Surutaiyan

== Production ==
The film's story was written by Rama Pandiyan who co-produced the film with Chakrapani while the dialogues were written by Vijay Krishnaraj who also appeared in an important role. The film was predominantly shot in the village KG Patti. A scene where Nalini scares Suresh was shot at lower camp around the hills of Cumbum near Madurai. The song "Yaaro Manmadhan" was shot in a set inside Prakash Studios.

== Original soundtrack ==
All lyrics are written by Muthulingam.; all music is composed by Chandrabose.

Track listing
No.	Title	Singer(s)	Length
1.	"Odaiyinna Nalloda"	K. J. Yesudas, S. Janaki	05:08
2.	"Vaazha Pazhuthirukku"	Vani Jairam	03:45
3.	"Yaaro Manmadhan"	S. P. Balasubrahmanyam	04:19
4.	"Kanchipuram"	Malaysia Vasudevan	02:58
5.	"En Vaazhvil"	Vani Jairam	03:38
Total length:			19:48

== Reception ==
Jayamanmadhan (a duo) of Kalki wrote that the story has been vividly told in a beautiful village backdrop and concluded that the film felt like having a mixture of sweet and spice. The duo praised Goundamani's acting, Devaraj's direction and Chandrabose's music. Balumani of Anna praised acting, music, cinematography and dialogues and noted although some songs in the early part of the film slightly reduce the excitement in the film, the latter part makes up for it by being lively.

== Bibliography ==
- Pandian, Anand Sankar (2004). Landscapes of Redemption: Cultivating Heart and Soil in South India. Berkeley: University of California. OCLC 62553717.
