= Idhayaththil Ore Idam =

- Directed by: Prasath
- Story by: P. Shanmugam
- Starring: Srikanth; Radikaa
- Music by: Ilaiyaraaja
- Production company: Sree Hariram Movies
- Release date: 8 February 1980
- Country: India
- Language: Tamil

Idhayaththil Ore Idam (transl. A place in the heart) is a 1980 Indian Tamil-language film, directed by Prasath and produced by Sree Hariram Movies. The film stars Srikanth and Radikaa. Originally scheduled for release in May 1979, it was released on 8 February 1980.

== Cast ==
- Srikanth
- Radikaa
- Major Sundarrajan
- Typist Gopu
- Sukumari
- Suruli Rajan
- Manorama

== Soundtrack ==
The music was composed by Ilaiyaraaja, with lyrics by Kannadasan.

Song	Singers
"Kaalangal Mazhai Kaalangal"	Malaysia Vasudevan, S. Janaki
"Kaaveri Gangaikku"	P. Jayachandran
"Maanikkam Vairangal"	K. J. Yesudas & Chorus
"Manappaarai Santhaiyile"	Chandran, L. R. Eeswari

== Reception ==
Kanthan of Kalki praised the acting of Srikanth, Radikaa, Sukumari and Sundarajan while also praising Shanmugam's story and Prasath's direction and concluded saying no wonder if this film will win a place in the hearts of fans.
