= Kaalaiyum Neeye Maalaiyum Neeye =

1988 film by R. Sundarrajan

- Theatrical release poster
- Directed by: R. Sundarrajan
- Written by: R. Sundarrajan
- Produced by: R. Ponraj; P K. Unni
- Starring: Vijayakanth; Prabhu; Radhika; Lakshmi
- Cinematography: Rajarajan
- Edited by: B Krishnakumar; Srinivas
- Music by: Devendran
- Production company: Poornachandra Arts
- Release date: 15 January 1988
- Running time: 144 minutes
- Country: India
- Language: Tamil

Kaalaiyum Neeye Maalaiyum Neeye (transl. You are both the morning and evening) is a 1988 Indian Tamil-language action film, written and directed by R. Sundarrajan. The film stars Vijayakanth, Prabhu, Radhika and Lakshmi. It was released on 15 January 1988.

== Cast ==
- Vijayakanth in dual role as
  - Raja
  - Inspector Viswanath
- Prabhu as Inspector Sekhar
- Pandiyan as Selvaa
- Lakshmi
- Radhika as Gowri
- Rekha as Shanthi
- Senthil
- C. R. Parthiban as Judge
- Vijayan
- Vijay Krishnaraj
- V. Gopalakrishnan
- Vennira Aadai Moorthy

== Production ==
Kaalaiyum Neeye Maalaiyum Neeye was originally announced in 1983 by Sundarrajan with Durga Bagavathi films producing it. The film's title was named after a song from Thennilavu (1961), composed by A. M. Rajah. During filming, Vijayakanth's face was cut by a metal casket due to another actor firing prematurely. The filming was held at Nagercoil and Kanyakumari.

== Soundtrack ==
The soundtrack was composed by Devendran with lyrics by Vaali, Gangai Amaran and Rajasundar.

Track listing
No.	Title	Singer(s)	Length
1.	"Kaalai Neeye"	S. Janaki
2.	"Rathrikku Konjam"	K. J. Yesudas
3.	"Kuk Kuk Koo Ena"	S. P. Balasubrahmanyam, S. Janaki
4.	"Sammatham Solla"	P. Jayachandran, S. Janaki
5.	"Vaadi En"	Malaysia Vasudevan, S. Janaki
6.	"Siraiyinil Veenai"	S. Janaki

== Release and reception ==
Kaalaiyum Neeye Maalaiyum Neeye was released on 15 January 1988. The following week, N. Krishnaswamy of The Indian Express wrote, "In the melange of incidents and medley of characters, artistes tend to get lost". He also did not like how both the lead actresses, Radhika and Lakshmi, were underutilised. Jayamanmadhan of Kalki criticised the film for having a poetic title and contrastingly violent content.
