= Aditi Khorana =

American-Indian author

Aditi Khorana is an American-Indian author based in Los Angeles. She is the author of Mirror in the Sky, named "one of the most powerful reads of the year" by Paste Magazine, and the critically acclaimed feminist historical fantasy Library of Fates.

== Early life and education ==
Khorana was born in New Delhi, India, and moved to the U.S. when she was three years old. Her father worked for the UN and she temporarily lived in Europe. She grew up in India, Denmark and New England. She received a BA in International relations from Brown University, Rhode Island, and an MA in Global Media and Communications from the Annenberg School for Communication.

== Career ==
Khorana worked as a journalist at ABC News, CNN and PBS News. She has also worked as a marketing executive consultant for various Hollywood studios like Fox, Paramount, and Sony.

She published her first book Mirror in the Sky in 2016 by Razorbill/Penguin. Her first book talks about the immigrant experience and addresses racism and xenophobia. Her first book is the subject of a Tedx talk, Harnessing the Power of the Unknown.

In July 2017, she published her second book Library of Fates, which is a fantasy fiction and tells the story of a young woman named Amrita, Princess of the Kingdom of Shalingar.

Her work has been featured on NPR, and in Los Angeles Review of Books, NBC News, Buzzfeed, EW, Bustle, Seventeen, Huffington Post, and Paste Magazine.

Themes in Khorana's writing include the immigrant experience, racism and xenophobia, Otherness, classism and how language shapes the social order. Khorana is known for creating work for teens and children that engages with the philosophical, existential, and political.

== Personal life ==
Khorana lives in Los Angeles and likes to read, hike, and explore LA's architecture.
