= Adithan =

Adithan is an Indian (Tamil) male given name, an alternative form of Aditya. Notable people with the name include:

- R. Puthunainar Adithan, Indian politician
- S. Kesava Adithan (1933–1982), Indian politician
- Sivanthi Adithan (1936–2013), Indian businessman and philanthropist
