= Adhitya =

Adhitya is a name. Notable people with the name include:

- Adhitya Shetty (born 2004), Emirati cricketer
- Ghifari Vaiz Adhitya (born 1999), Indonesian footballer
