= Rajesh (Tamil actor) =

Indian actor (1949–2025)

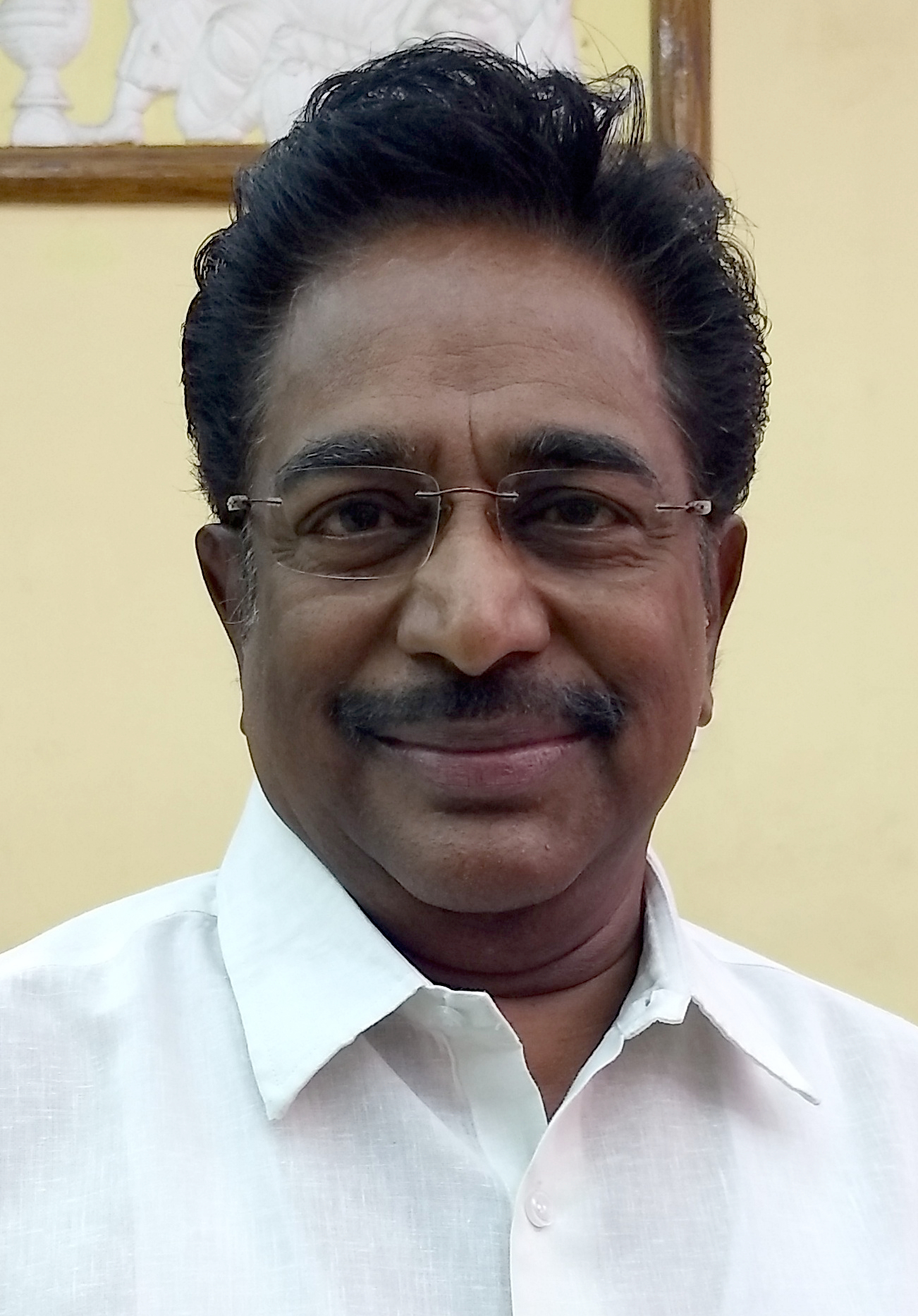
- Rajesh in 2018
- Born: Rajesh Williams; 20 December 1949; Mannargudi, Tanjore District, Madras Province, Dominion of India (now in Thiruvarur district, Tamil Nadu, India)
- Died: 29 May 2025 (aged 75); Chennai, Tamil Nadu, India
- Occupation: Actor
- Years active: 1974–2025
- Spouse: Joan Sylvia (m. 1983; died 2012)
- Children: 2
- Family: Mahendran (cousin)

Rajesh (20 December 1949 – 29 May 2025) was an Indian actor who performed in predominantly Tamil films and serials. He completed more than 50 years in films and appeared as lead roles and supporting roles in over 150 films.

== Life and career ==
Rajesh was born on 20 December 1949 to Williams Nattar and Lily Grace Mankondar at Mannargudi, Tiruvarur district, his family hails from Anaikkadu, in Thanjavur district, India in a Kallar (Thevar) family. He studied in Dindigul, Vadamadurai, Melanatham Aanaikadu and Chinnamanur Theni district. After finishing his PUC in Karaikudi Alagappa College, he joined Pachaiappas College, but did not complete his college education. He worked as a teacher in St Paul's High School, Purasawalkam and later at Kellett Higher Secondary School, Triplicane from 1972 to 1979.

In 1974, he got a chance to act in the film Aval Oru Thodar Kathai in a small role. His first film as a hero was Kanni Paruvathile (1979), produced by Rajkannu. Rajesh acted in Achamillai Achamillai, by K. Balachander. Later, he moved into playing character roles, and acted in movies with Kamal Haasan like Sathyaa (1988), Mahanadhi (1994) and Virumaandi (2004).

Later in life, he was in the hotel and real estate business, and he was a leading builder in the city. He also wrote biographies of Hollywood actors in Tamil.

He was a Christian, later he was active in Periyaar's ideologies, then he involved himself in Astrology. He wrote many books and articles about astrology.

=== Personal life ===
In 1983, Rajesh married Joan Sylvia, daughter of Mr. Eddy Firbank a renowned NRI who lived 30 years in Middle East. They had one daughter Divya and one son Deepak, who made his acting debut in 2014. His wife died on 6 August 2012.

He was the first Tamil actor to build a bungalow for the purpose of movie shooting in 1985 near KK Nagar, Chennai, which was inaugurated by the then Chief Minister M.G. Ramachandran. Many Tamil, Malayalam and Hindi movie shootings were completed in that house. He later sold it in 1993, while starting his real estate business. In the early 1990s, as advised by his friend Jeppiaar, he started a Real Estate business, then he started hotel and construction business. He was active in politics from 1987 to 1991, supporting Janaki. He was also a follower of Karl Marx. He visited the UK and paid his tribute to the great leader.

=== Death ===
Rajesh died from a heart attack in Chennai, in the early hours of 29 May 2025, at the age of 75.

== Filmography ==
- All films are in Tamil, unless otherwise noted.

=== As actor ===
List of performances in films
Year	Film	Role	Notes
1974	Aval Oru Thodar Kathai	Petitioner	Uncredited role
1979	Kanni Paruvathile	Subbiah	
1980	Thani Maram		
1980	Thai Pongal		
1980	Naan Naanethaan		
1981	Andha 7 Naatkal	Anand	
1981	Oruthi Mattum Karaiyinile		
1981	Mayil		
1981	Paakku Vethalai		
1981	Velichathukku Vaanga		
1982	Kannodu Kan		
1982	Sivantha Kangal		
1982	Thanikattu Raja	Ethiraj's brother	
1982	Deviyin Thiruvilayadal		
1982	Payanangal Mudivathillai	Mohan	
1982	Metti	Vijayan	
1982	Vetri Namathe		
1982	Avanukku Nigar Avane		
1982	Kadhoduthan Naan Pesuven		
1983	Anal Kaatru		
1983	Kan Sivandhaal Man Sivakkum		
1983	Thai Veedu	Geetha's love interest	Guest appearance
1983	Yaamirukka Bhayamen		
1983	Yuga Dharmam		
1984	Achamillai Achamillai	Ulaganathan	
1984	Alaya Deepam		
1984	Ezhuthatha Sattangal	Gopinath	
1984	Kuzhandai Yesu		
1984	Sanga Natham		
1984	Simma Soppanam	Labour Leader	
1984	Sirai	Anthony	
1984	Naanayam Illatha Naanayam	Inspector Irulappan	
1984	Nee Thodum Pothu		
1984	Ponnu Pudichirukku		
1984	Mudivalla Arambam		
1985	Ammavum Neeye Appavum Neeye		
1985	Idhu Engal Raajiyam		
1985	Uthami	Sivashankar / Sivaram	
1985	Kolusu		
1985	Santhosha Kanavukal	Kannan	
1985	Mel Maruvathoor Arpudhangal	Mari Muthu	
1985	Samayapurathale Saatchi		
1985	Chithirame Chitirame		
1985	Chain Jayapal		
1985	Melmaruvathur Aadhi Parasakthi		
1985	Rajathi Rojakili	Surutaiyan	
1985	Veli		
1986	Sarvam Sakthimayam		
1986	Nilave Malare	Raghu	
1986	Mahasakthi Maariamman		
1986	Manakanakku	Pandiyan	
1986	Melmaruvathur Arpudhangal	Mari Muthu	
1986	Yaro Ezhudhia Kavithai		
1986	Mannukkul Vairam	Velappa	
1987	Ilangeswaran	Ilangeswaran	
1987	Kaalam Maaruthu		
1987	Murugane Thunai		
1987	Thaali Dhaanam		
1987	Ellai Kodu		
1987	Makkal En Pakkam	Rajmohan	
1988	Sathyaa	Mariappa	
1988	Pattikattu Thambi		
1989	Sattathin Thirappu Vizhaa	Prabhu Das	
1989	Dharma Devan		
1989	Penbutthi Munbutthi		
1989	Vaathiyaar Veettu Pillai	Gowri's father	
1990	Kavalukku Kettikaran	Balayya	
1990	Sirayil Pootha Chinna Malar	Rajalingam	
1990	Nalla Kaalam Porandaachu	Asogan	
1990	Pudhu Pudhu Ragangal		
1990	Murugane Thunai		
1991	Nallathai Naadu Kekum	DSP Prabhakaran	
1991	Paadhai Maariya Payanam		
1991	Perum Pulli		
1991	Unna Nenachen Pattu Padichen	Inspector	
1991	Abhimanyu	Police Inspector	Malayalam film
1992	Thambi Pondatti	Chellappa	
1992	Chinna Marumagal	Sekhar	
1992	Mudhal Seedhanam		
1992	Vaaname Ellai	Samyvelu	
1992	Kathirukka Neramillai	D.I.G. Mohanraj	
1993	Chinna Jameen	Advocate Rajamanickam	
1993	Ponnumani		
1993	Varam Tharum Vadivelan		
1994	Ravanan	Meena's father	
1994	Jai Hind	Seenivasan	
1994	The City	C. I. Durai	Malayalam film
1994	Thamarai	Subbarayan	
1994	Mahanadhi	Muthusamy	
1995	Mannai Thottu Kumbidanum	Sathyamoorthy	
1995	Aval Potta Kolam		
1996	Aruva Velu	Muthurasa	
1997	Iruvar	Madhivanan	
1997	Mannava	Kavitha's father	
1997	Pongalo Pongal	School Master	
1997	Nerrukku Ner	Thamizharasan	
1997	Thaali Pudhusu	Seetha's father	
1998	En Uyir Nee Thaane	Janaki's brother	
1999	Ooty	Balu's uncle	
1999	Kudumba Sangili	Chidambaram	
2000	Budget Padmanabhan	Subramaniam	
2001	Dheena	Police officer	
2001	Love Channel	Sethumadai Gounder	
2001	Citizen	Judge Krishnan	
2002	Ramana	Ka. Parandhaman IAS, District Collector	
2002	Red	Manimegalai	
2003	Saamy	Judge Sivaraman	
2003	Anjaneya	Education officer	
2003	Sindhamal Sitharamal	Kandasamy	
2003	Parasuram	Director General of Police	
2004	Virumaandi	Chennai Police Commissioner	
2004	Kovil	Church Father Anthony James	
2004	Autograph	Pandian	
2004	Udhaya	Muthuswamypillai	
2004	Maanasthan		
2004	Chatrapathy		
2004	Dreams	Lawyer Varadharajan	
2004	Jananam	Chief Minister	
2005	Aayudham	Siva's father	
2005	Ji	Vasu's uncle	
2005	Padhavi Paduthum Paadu	Manivasagam	
2005	Kaatrullavarai	Ramkumar	
2005	Sivakasi	Meiyappan	
2005	Mazhai	Sundaram	
2006	E		
2006	Dharmapuri	Valarmathi's father	
2006	Thirupathi	Chief Minister	Guest appearance
2006	Theenda Theenda	Paramasivam	
2006	Paramasivan	SI Ganapathy	
2006	Varalaru	Assistant commissioner of police	
2007	18 Vayasu Puyale		
2007	Marudhamalai	Circle Inspector	
2008	Arai En 305-il Kadavul	Thanjai Rudhran	
2008	Kannum Kannum		
2008	Seval	Murugesan's father	
2009	Anthony Yaar?	Priest	
2010	Porkkalam	Karnan's father	
2010	Siddhu +2	Siddhu's father	
2010	Ochayee	Periyamaayan	
2010	Mudhal Kadhal Mazhai		
2011	Doo	Swapna's father	
2013	Kantha	Varadharajan	
2013	Jannal Oram	Vinayagam, Village Panchayat Chief	
2014	Tenaliraman	Restaurateur	
2014	Thirudan Police	Head constable Singaram	
2016	Gethu	Colonel Matthews	
2016	Dharma Durai	Doctor Kamaraj aka Muniyandi	
2018	Sarkar	T. N. Chari, Election Commissioner	
2021	Master	College staff member	
2022	Yaanai	P.R.Veerapandiyan "PRV"	
2023	Rudhran	Subbiah	
2023	Yaadhum Oore Yaavarum Kelir	Church Father	
2023	Kathar Basha Endra Muthuramalingam		
2023	Unnaal Ennaal		
2024	Merry Christmas	Yadhoom Uncle	
2026	Sigma	Released after his death	

=== As dubbing artist ===
Year	Actor	Films	Notes
2001	Murali	Dumm Dumm Dumm	
2003	Murali	Joot	
2005	Murali	Majaa	
2005	Murali	Ullam Ketkume	
2005	Murali	Raam	
2008	Nedumudi Venu	Poi Solla Porom	
2016	Joy Mathew	Devi	

== Television ==
Year	Title	Role	Channel	Language
2000	Micro Thodargal-Azhukku Vetti		Raj TV	Tamil
2000	Micro Thodargal-Savvukadi		Raj TV	Tamil
2001–2003	Alaigal	Krishna	Sun TV	Tamil
2004–2006	Kanavarukaaga		Sun TV	Tamil
2005	Swami Ayyapan		Asianet	Malayalam
2009–	Dhayam		Kalaignar	Tamil
2012	Aan Paavam	Gopalaswamy	Sun TV	Tamil
2014	Mudivalla Arambam		Vendhar	Tamil
2014	Akka		Jaya TV	Tamil
2015–2016	Kalathu Veedu		Vijay TV	Tamil
2018–2022	Roja	Tiger Manickam	Sun TV	Tamil
2020	Suryavamsam	Selva Ganapathy (Special Appearance)	Zee Tamil	Tamil
2020	Poove Unakkaga	Tiger Manickam (Special Appearance)	Sun TV	Tamil
2021	Sillunu Oru Kaadhal	Sivaraman Zamindar (Special Appearance)	Colors Tamil	Tamil
2022	Kana Kaanum Kaalangal	Mr. Sakthivel	Disney+Hotstar	Tamil
2022–2024	Karthigai Deepam	Dharmalingam	Zee Tamil	Tamil
