= Sandhana Kaatru =

- Poster
- Directed by: Manivannan
- Written by: Manivannan
- Produced by: Sengamalam Manivannan
- Starring: Vijayakanth; Gautami
- Cinematography: D. Shankar
- Edited by: P. Venkateswara Rao
- Music by: Shankar–Ganesh
- Production company: Kamala Jothi Combines
- Release date: 1 June 1990
- Running time: 130 minutes
- Country: India
- Language: Tamil

Sandhana Kaatru (transl. Sandal Air) is a 1990 Indian Tamil-language action film written and directed by Manivannan. The film stars Vijayakanth and Gautami. It was released on 1 June 1990.

== Plot ==
The film begins with Azhagiri (Vijayakanth) in serious condition in a hospital because he was shot by the police.

In the past, he was a military officer who married Raasathi (Gautami). After spending a few years in a military camp, Azhagiri rejoined his wife and daughter. They shifted to Ramu's (R. Sarathkumar) house. Ramu was Azhagiri's friend and his superior Chakravarthy's (Vinu Chakravarthy) son. A few years ago, Ramu teased Raasathi, and he was beaten for this act along with his friends Viswanath (Vichu Vishwanath) and Vijay (Vijay Krishnaraj). They cannot forget the humiliation, so they tried to rape Raasathi, but she committed suicide before. Azhagiri first killed Viswanath in a public place and was therefore arrested for the crime and was sentenced to the death penalty. The day before his penalty, he escaped from jail, but the police found him and shot him.

Azhagiri is now cured and sees Vijay in the same hospital, who was also a patient. Azhagiri then begged the police to stay in the hospital for few more days. Thereafter, he smoothly killed Vijay without anyone suspecting him. Azhagiri then managed to escape from the hospital with the nurse's help. Azhagiri is now determined to kill Ramu before the police catch him.

== Cast ==
- Vijayakanth as Azhagiri
- Gautami as Raasathi
- R. Sarathkumar as Ramu
- Sarath Babu as Dr. Sarath
- Vinu Chakravarthy as Chakravarthy
- Vichu Vishwanath as Viswanath
- Vijay Krishnaraj as Vijay
- Vaishnavi as Shanthi
- Kitty as Police Inspector
- Kovai Sarala
- Gandhimathi
- S. S. Chandran
- Periya Karuppu Thevar
- Vasu
- Kokila as Arukkani
- Sakthivel
- Babloo Prithiveeraj as Special appearance
- Disco Shanti as Special appearance
- Ilavarasu (uncredited role)

== Soundtrack ==
The music was composed by Shankar–Ganesh, with lyrics written by Vaali, Karaikudi Venkatesh and Jeeva Bharathi.

Song	Singer(s)	Duration
"Oh Thendrale Oru Pattu Paadu" (female)	K. S. Chithra	5:54
"Oh Thendrale Oru Pattu Paadu" (male)	K. J. Yesudas	4:47
"Pattu Paavaadai Katti"	S. P. Balasubrahmanyam	3:54
"Raasathi Raasathi"	S. P. Balasubrahmanyam	5:36
"Raavu Neram Vaadai Kaathu"	Mano, K. S. Chithra	4:37
"Sandanakaatril Sundara Pookal"	S. P. Balasubrahmanyam	4:44

== Reception ==
C. R. K. of Kalki said the first half of the film has too many songs due to less scenes while second half travels in the path of blood and violence.
