= Aditi Ramesh =

Indian singer-songwriter

Aditi Ramesh is an independent singer-songwriter and former lawyer, based in Mumbai. She is trained in Carnatic music and has been part of several bands such as Ladies Compartment and Voctronica. She has also performed at the Mood Indigo festival at IIT Bombay. She released the songs "Sambar Soul" and "Shakti" in 2020.
