= Melmaruvathur Arpudhangal =

- Title card
- Directed by: Jagadeesan
- Screenplay by: Jagadeesan
- Story by: 'Sakthi Dasan' C. Ganesan
- Produced by: Ja. Gurumoorthi
- Starring: Rajesh; Nalini; Radha Ravi; Sulochana; K. R. Vijaya
- Cinematography: W. R. Chandran
- Edited by: S. V. Jayabal
- Music by: K. V. Mahadevan
- Production company: Om Selvi Arts
- Release date: 1 October 1986
- Running time: 135 minutes
- Country: India
- Language: Tamil

Melmaruvathur Arpudhangal (transl. Miracles in Melmaruvathur) is 1986 Indian Tamil-language devotional film written and directed by Jagadeesan from a story by "Sakthi Dasan" C. Ganesan. Music was by K. V. Mahadevan. The film stars Rajesh, Sulakshana, Nalini and Radha Ravi. It was released on 1 October 1986.

== Cast ==
- Rajesh as Mari Muthu
- Sulakshana as Gayathri
- Radha Ravi as Rajadurai
- Nalini as Karpagam
- Thengai Srinivasan as Village President
- K. R. Vijaya as Goddess Sakthi
- Pile Sivan as Raja Durai's Friend
- S. N. Parvathi as Mari Muthu's Neighbour
- Payalvaan Ranganathan as Raja Durai's Henchmen
- MLA Thangaraj
- Raj Krishna
- Mythili Priya

== Soundtrack ==
Music was composed by K. V. Mahadevan.

Tamil version

Lyrics were written by Vaali.

Song	Singer	Length
"Ore Thaai Ore Kulam"	Sirkazhi Govindarajan	03:38
"Oora Paadala"	Malaysia Vasudevan	01:09
"Unna Thaane Malaya"	K. J. Yesudas	04:06
"Amma Unathu Arputhangal"	Vani Jairam	04:33
"Aanaiyittal Aadukkiren"	P. Susheela	04:37
"Ennai Peththavalae"	K. J. Yesudas	04:15
"Vanga Kadalin"	S. P. Sailaja	05:15
"Vaanamayil Pole"	Vani Jairam	04:14

Telugu version

This film was dubbed into Telugu as Aadhi Sakthi Mahimalu. Lyrics were written by Rajasri.

Song	Singer	Length (m:ss)
"Ninnu Nenu"	S. P. Balasubrahmanyam	04:12
"Amma Needu"	Vani Jairam	04:39
"Ananthiga"	P. Susheela	04:44
"Kannu Penchhina"	Raj Seetharam	04:20
"Punya Sagara"	Vani Jairam	05:17
"Oorikai Paadave"	G. Anand	01:18

== Reception ==
The Indian Express wrote, "Jagadeesan works at his subject at an unhurried pace coolly, but not casually or perfunctorily". Jayamanmadhan of Kalki called the film's screenplay and Mahadevan's music as plus points. Balumani of Anna praised acting, lyrics, music, cinematography, stunts and direction.
