= Aditya (name) =

Aditya (Sanskrit: आदित्य, romanized: Āditya, lit. 'of Aditi', Sanskrit pronunciation: [aːd̪ɪt̪jɐ]) is both a male given name and a surname. In Hinduism, Adityas refers to the offspring of Aditi, the goddess representing infinity. The name Aditya, in the singular, is taken to refer to the sun god Surya. Notable people with the name include:

== Given name ==
- Aaditya Thackeray, Cabinet Minister of Tourism and Environment, Government of Maharashtra
- Adithya Menon, Indian actor
- Aditya (actor), Indian film actor in Kannada cinema
- Aditya Babu, Tollywood producer and actor
- Aditya Chopra, Bollywood movie producer
- Aditya Dhar, Indian filmmaker and lyricist
- Aditya Gadhvi, Indian singer and lyricist
- Aditya Mittal, CFO Arcelor Mittal, son of Lakshmi Mittal
- Aditya Narayan, Indian singer, actor and television host
- Aditya Om, Indian film actor, writer, lyricist, director and producer
- Aditya Pancholi, Bollywood actor
- Aditya Roy Kapoor, Indian actor in Bollywood cinema
- Aditya Tiwari, Indian poet and LGBT rights activist
- Aditya Vikram Birla (1943–1995), Indian industrialist, founder of Aditya Birla
