= Janani (1985 film) =

- Theatrical release poster
- Directed by: Nethaji
- Written by: Nethaji
- Produced by: Pazhaniyappa Ramasami
- Starring: Bhavya; Udhayakumar; Vinod
- Cinematography: Soumendu Roy; Viswam Nataraj
- Edited by: T. Karunanidhi
- Music by: M. S. Viswanathan
- Production company: Gemini Studios
- Release date: 27 September 1985
- Country: India
- Language: Tamil

Janani (/dʒənəni/) is a 1985 Indian Tamil-language teen romance film written and directed by Nethaji, and produced by Gemini Studios. The film, starring Bhavya, Udhayakumar and Vinod, was released on 27 September 1985.

== Cast ==
Adapted from:

- Bhavya as Janani
- Udhayakumar as Venkat
- Vinod as Jegan
- Charlie
- Jayaram
- Murugesh
- Prabhakar
- Manimala
- Srilatha as Sumangali

== Production ==
GK who went on to become a popular art director joined as chief art director for this film. R. V. Udayakumar worked as the film's associate director and production executive. The film featured debutants Udhayakumar and Bhavya from Bengal in lead roles alongside Vinod, Charles and Jayaram from the Film Institute making their debuts. It remains the only Tamil film of Bhavya.

== Soundtrack ==
The music was composed by M. S. Viswanathan, with lyrics by the director Nethaji. The song "Mannikka Maataya" became popular.

Track listing
No.	Title	Singer(s)	Length
1.	"Mannikka Maataya"	K. J. Yesudas
2.	"Naattu Sarakithu"	Malaysia Vasudevan, Saibaba
3.	"Konjum Malar"	S. P. Balasubrahmanyam, Vani Jairam
4.	"Mannikka Maataya"	P. Susheela

== Critical reception ==
Jayamanmadhan of Kalki praised the acting of Bhavya but panned the acting of lead actor Udaykumar and character design of antagonist Vinod while also panning a song in Viswanathan's music and concluded Nethaji neither did a great work nor a terrible work. Balumani of Anna praised the acting of the lead pair, Nethaji's direction, Viswanathan's music and concluded it will be a successful film which will be lapped by youth audience like Oru Thalai Ragam.
