= Aditi Sharma (cricketer) =

Indian cricketer

Personal information
- Full name: Aditi Keshavdev Sharma
- Born: 5 August 1996 (age 30); Uttar Pradesh, India
- Batting: Right-handed
- Bowling: Right-arm off break
- Role: Allrounder
- Source: CricArchive, 3 March 2019

Aditi Keshavdev Sharma (born 5 August 1996 at Jhansi) is an Uttar Pradeshi First-class cricket cricketer. She plays for Uttar Pradesh and Central Zone. She has played 1 First-class, 7 List A cricket and 10 Women's Twenty20 matches. She made her debut in major domestic cricket in a one-day match on 12 December 2014 against Hyderabad.
