= Raja Chinna Roja =

1989 film by S. P. Muthuraman

- Poster
- Directed by: S. P. Muthuraman
- Written by: Panchu Arunachalam
- Produced by: M Saravanan; M. Balasubramaniam
- Starring: Rajinikanth; Raghuvaran; Gautami
- Cinematography: T. S. Vinayagam
- Edited by: R. Vittal; C. Lancy
- Music by: Chandrabose
- Production company: AVM Productions
- Release date: 20 July 1989
- Running time: 145 minutes
- Country: India
- Language: Tamil

Raja Chinna Roja (transl. King and small rose) is a 1989 Indian Tamil-language children's film, directed by S. P. Muthuraman, written by Panchu Arunachalam and produced by AVM Productions. The film stars Rajinikanth, Raghuvaran and Gautami. Its plot revolves around an aspiring actor who meets his childhood friend, but is forced to take care of his nieces and nephews.

Raja Chinna Roja was the first Indian film to feature live action with animation. It is a remake of the 1971 Bengali film Jay Jayanti, which itself is based on the 1965 film The Sound of Music. It also borrows inspiration from Arunachalam's 1974 film Unnaithan Thambi and the American films Mary Poppins (1964). The cinematography was handled by T. S. Vinayagam, the editing by R. Vittal and Lancy, and music was composed by Chandrabose.

Raja Chinna Roja was released on 20 July 1989. The film was commercially successful and had a 175-day theatrical run, with the animated sequence particularly being well received. Arunachalam won the Cinema Express Award for Best Story Writer.

== Plot ==
Raja, an aspiring actor, leaves his village and enters the city to fulfill his ambition. As he is searching for a place in the dream factory, he falls for Sumathi, the daughter of the house owner. Charmed by his looks and character, Sumathi also falls for him. One day he accidentally meets his childhood friend Bhaskar, a spoiled rich man. He offers Raja an acting job, then takes him to his uncle's house. Raja is to be in charge of the administration of the household and take care of five children (Bhaskar's nieces and nephews), each of whom have issues (such as being lazy, not studying etc.).

Raja finds out that Bhaskar is cheating his uncle out of funds and using him to do the same. Bhaskar is involved in drug business along with his associates. Rajaram who gets temporary blindness, recovers but pretends to still be blind to find out the truth of Bhaskar. After finding out the truth, Rajaram throws Bhaskar out of the home. In retaliation, Bhaskar takes away his uncle's car resulting in Rajaram getting arrested for drugs. Raja, along with the children goes to Bhaskar's den and catches him red-handed. Raja finally achieves his ambition to become an actor, with Rajaram directing the film.

== Cast ==
- Rajinikanth as Raja
- Raghuvaran as Bhaskar
- Gautami as Sumathi
- Ravichandran as Rajaram
- S. S. Chandran as Appasamy
- Kovai Sarala as Kannamma
- Baby Shalini as Chithra
- Kitty as Jojo
- Chinni Jayanth as Ramu
- Azhagu as Johnny
- Kumari Raghavi as Shanthi
- V. K. Ramasamy as Namasivayam
- LIC Narasimhan as Inspector Sivaraman
- Rupini as herself (cameo)

== Production ==
=== Development ===
After the success of Manithan (1987), M. Saravanan of AVM Productions decided to produce another film with the same cast and crew: director S. P. Muthuraman, hero Rajinikanth and composer Chandrabose. Saravanan wanted to make a film "targeted at kids" due to Rajinikanth's popularity among children. The crew initially wanted to adapt Babu (1971); however, Rajinikanth "felt that the script seemed more like an art film, on the lines of Aarilirunthu Arubathu Varai and Engeyo Ketta Kural" and it would not suit his image. Screenwriter Panchu Arunachalam reused the script of his own film Unnaithan Thambi (1974) and also drew inspiration from the American films Mary Poppins (1964) and The Sound of Music (1965).

=== Casting and filming ===
The makers decided to revolve the story around Shalini, who was cast among the child artists, due to her popularity. Raghuvaran was chosen to portray a negative role after the makers were impressed with his performance in the television series Oru Manithanin Kathai. Raja Chinna Roja was the first Indian film to feature live action with animation. It was Saravanan's wish to do this, without any budgetary constraints. He also wanted AVM to become the first Indian studio to do this. The idea of blending live action with animation was inspired by Who Framed Roger Rabbit (1988). The animated song was shot at a forest set built by art director Chalam at AVM Studios with all the artists involved. Puliyur Saroja, choreographer of the song along with her assistants enact like animals to "evoke the appropriate reaction from the artistes". The animation was done by Ram Mohan, who "ended up drawing 84,000 sketches for this song as every frame had to be drawn individually". Ram Mohan was initially reluctant to work on the film as he felt it was impossible to animate an entire song sequence, but relented after Muthuraman told him he could take three months as the animated portions could be added after the live action portions were shot.

== Soundtrack ==
The soundtrack was composed by Chandrabose and the lyrics were written by Vairamuthu. The song "Superstar Yaarunu Ketta" was well-received and was remixed by Santhosh Bose for the film Kalayatha Ninaivugal (2005).

Song	Singers	Length
"Super Staru"	S. P. Balasubrahmanyam, S. P. Sailaja	04:25
"Raja Chinna Roja"	S. P. Balasubrahmanyam	04:46
"Varungala Mannargale"	S. P. Balasubrahmanyam	04:23
"Oru Panbadu"	K. J. Yesudas	04:32
"Ongappanukkum Pe Pe"	S. P. Balasubrahmanyam, S P Sailaja	03:43
"Poo Poo Pol"	Mano	05:14
"Devaadhi Devar Ellaam"	Malaysia Vasudevan	04:57

== Release ==
Raja Chinna Roja was released on 20 July 1989 and became a commercial success, with a 175-day theatrical run. The animated sequence was well received, and brought repeat audiences to theatres. Arunachalam won the Cinema Express Award for Best Story Writer.

== Bibliography ==
- Ramachandran, Naman (2014) [2012]. Rajinikanth: The Definitive Biography. New Delhi: Penguin Books. ISBN 978-0-14-342111-5.
- Saravanan, M. (2013) [2005]. AVM 60 Cinema (in Tamil) (3rd ed.). Rajarajan Pathippagam. OCLC 1158347612.
