= Ghashiram Kotwal =

1972 play by Vijay Tendulkar

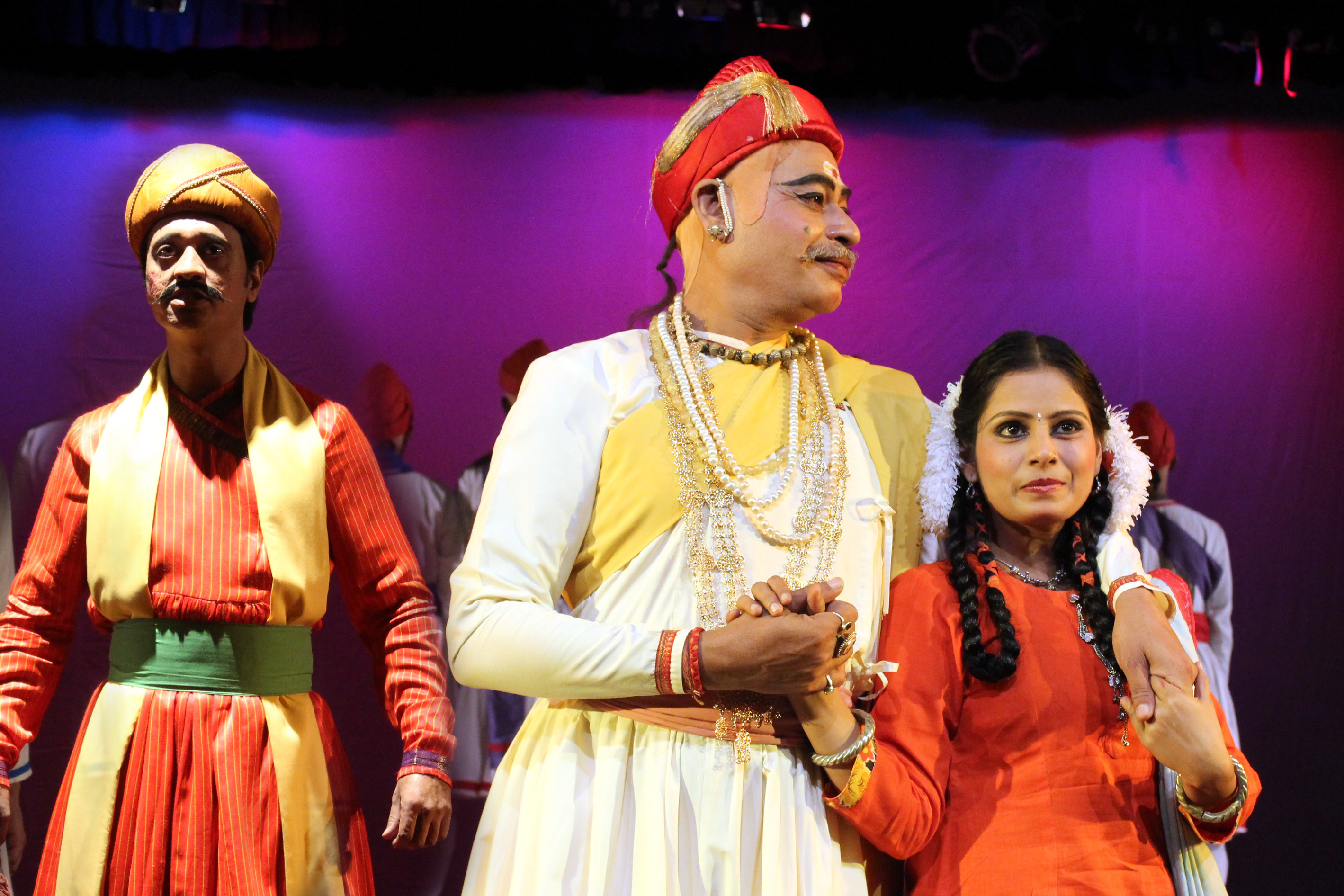
- Written by: Vijay Tendulkar

Premiere
- Directed by: Jabbar Patel

Ghashiram Kotwal is a Marathi play written by playwright Vijay Tendulkar in 1972 as a response to the rise of a local political party, in Maharashtra. The play is a political satire, written as historical drama. It is based on the life of Nana Phadnavis (1741–1800), one of the prominent ministers in the court of the Peshwa of Pune and Ghashiram Kotwal, the police chief of the city. Its theme is how men in power give rise to ideologies to serve their purposes, and later destroy them when they become useless.Jayant Karve and an American professor Eleanor Zelliot jointly translated Ghashiram Kotwal from the Marathi into English (Calcutta, 1984). It was first performed on 16 December 1972, by the Progressive Dramatic Association in Pune. Jabbar Patel's production of the play in 1973 is considered a classic in Modern Indian Theatre.

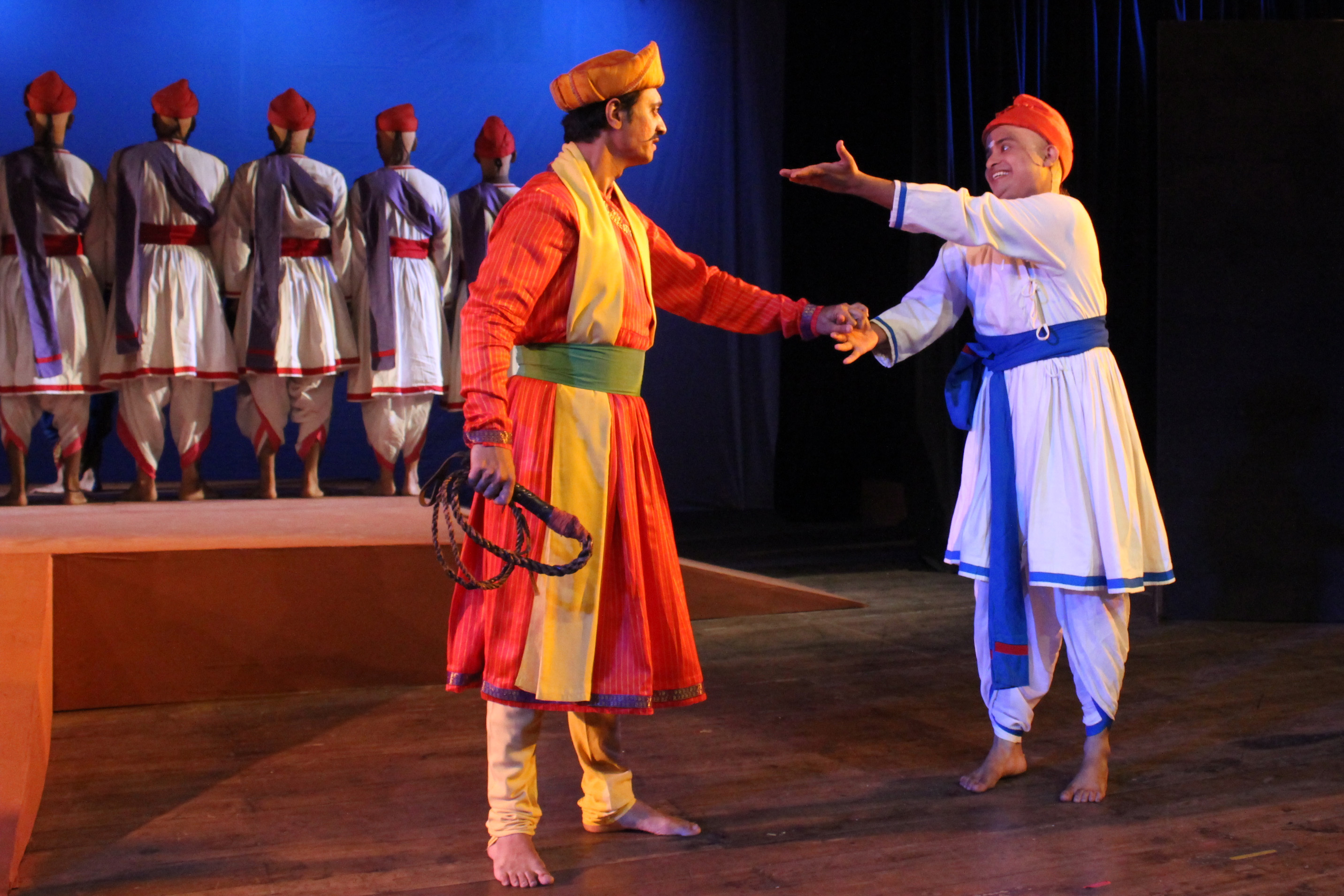
Ghasiram Kotwal play at Bharat Bhavan Bhopal

== History ==
Tendulkar based his play on a 1863 story by author-historian Moroba Kanhoba who tossed together history and fiction to write Ghashiram Kotwal and saw it as something of a simple morality play.

The first performance of this play was at Bharat Natya Mandir in Pune on 16 December 1972. The play initially generated a huge controversy, but has been considered a success in the following years. The play was staged at different venues during a tour of Western Europe in 1980. In 1986, the play toured cities in US and Canada.In 1989, the group took the play on a tour of east European countries of Soviet Union, East Germany, Hungary, and Yugoslavia.

== Synopsis ==
The play begins with an invocation to lord Ganesha. Then the Brahmins of Pune introduce themselves and we can see the morally corrupt state of affairs in Pune. Nana Phadnavis who is the Diwan (Chief Secretary) of Pune is also corrupt and visits the lavani dancer. Ghashiram is working with the Lavani dancer. He is impressed by the wit of Ghashiram. Ghashiram being a Brahmin goes to collect alms at the Peshwa's festival the next day. However, he is ill-treated there and is charged with pick-pocketing and imprisoned for the offense. He then decides to take revenge. So the play continues on to reach the next part of this play.

Ghashiram barters his own daughter Gauri to get the post of Kotwal (police chief) of Pune from Nana. Having got the post he begins to enforce strict rules in the city. He starts asking for permits for everything and starts throwing people in jail for the smallest offenses. When the commoners come to Nana with a complaint, he dismisses them & is deeply indulged with Gauri. In the meantime, Gauri becomes pregnant by Nana and dies during childbirth. Nana asks her body thrown in the river in secret. He convinces Ghashiram that the title he enjoys is only because of his patronage. The situation goes out of hand when a few brahmins visitors to the city are put in jail, and die from suffocation due to inadequate ventilation in their custody. The Brahmin of Pune then complains to the Peshwa. The Peshwa summons Nana who orders Ghashiram to be killed in the most inhumane way possible. Nana ignores his summons, the Brahmins then surround his palace protest. To save his skin Nana finally gives orders for execution of Ghashiram.

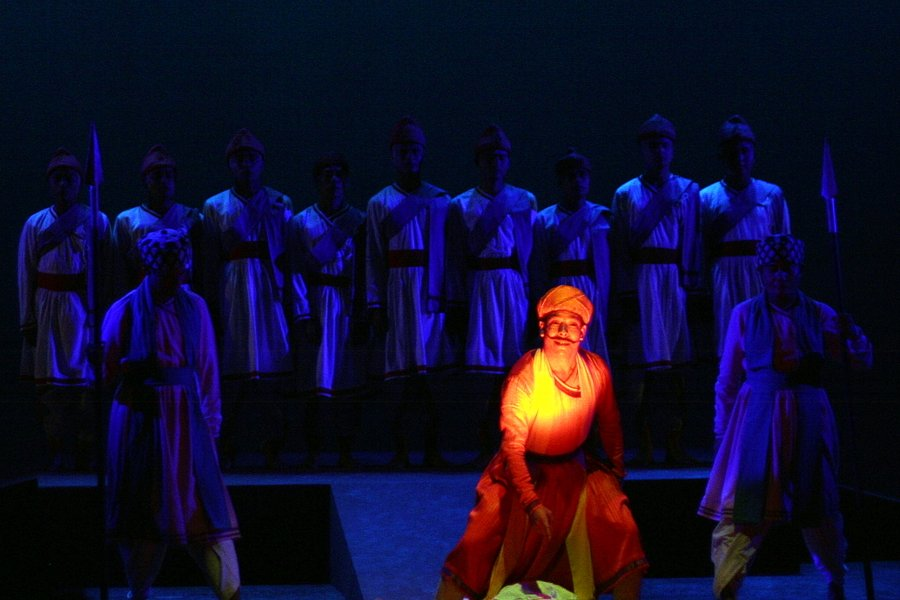
Ghasiram Kotwal Play in Delhi

== Style ==
The play is notable for the use of the "Tamasha" form in Marathi folk theatre. Singing and dancing are used here to good effect. "Abhangas" (devotional songs) are mixed with "Lavnis" (love songs).

== Original cast and crew ==
- Ghashiram Savaldas: Ramesh Tilekar
- Nana Phadnavis: Mohan Agashe
- Sutradhar (Narrator): Shreeram Ranade
- Singers: Anand Modak, Ravindra Sathe, Chandrakant Kale
- Music: Bhaskar Chandavarkar
- Dance: Krishndev Mulgund
- Director: Jabbar Patel
- Arvind Thakar

=== Musicians ===
- Music: Bhaskar Chandavarkar
- Ravindra Sathe - manjiri/tal
- Chandrakant Kale - Chipali
- Ashok Gaikwad - Dholaki/Tabla
- Prabhashankar Gaikwad - sundri
- Shrikant Rajpathak - Mrudung
- Shyam Bhende - Harmonium

== Controversy ==
Like many of Tendulkar's plays, this play created a lot of controversy because it offended the Chitpavan Brahmin community and that it showed the statesman Nana Phadnavis in a bad light. Hence it was temporarily banned in the state. Shiv Sena leader Manohar Joshi, also a Brahmin, was in the forefront of the anti-Ghasiram agitation in Mumbai, and the party stopped the staging of the play in the metropolis in 1971-72.

Ghashiram was a North Indian Brahmin, a resident of Aurangabad, who was appointed as the Police prefect of Poona on 8 February 1777 and continued to hold officer till his death which took place on 31 August 1791 under violent circumstances. He had earned Nana's confidence by his faithful service during the critical times that followed the Peshwa Narayan Rao's murder. He enjoyed the full trust of Nana Phadnavis and his administration was notoriously worse than that of his predecessors. He was the man who had been appointed to watch the movements and plans of Raghunath Rao and his family and he reported to Nana whatever suited his purpose. He had under him a large body of unscrupulous spies, everyone possessing ample means of harassing people in consequence of which the word Ghashiram has become a permanent synonym for oppression and tyranny. The rule of Ghashiram was cruel and tyrannical. However, there is no historical evidence to support the portrayal of Nana Phadnavis as depicted in the play. The controversy also unfortunately undermines the crucial contribution made by Nana Phadnavis towards India's freedom movement.

== Film adaptation ==
The play was adapted into a Marathi film, Ghashiram Kotwal (1976), which was the debut film of actor Om Puri. The main characters were played by Prakash Belawadi and Mohan Agashe. The film's screenplay was written by Vijay Tendulkar. The film was directed by K. Hariharan and Mani Kaul in cooperation with 16 graduates of the FTII.
