= Thiyagu (film) =

- Title card
- Directed by: S. P. Muthuraman
- Written by: Sivasankari
- Based on: Oru Manithanin Kathai by Sivasankari
- Produced by: M. Saravanan; M. Balasubramanian
- Starring: Raghuvaran
- Music by: Shankar–Ganesh
- Production company: AVM Productions
- Release date: 5 October 1990
- Country: India
- Language: Tamil

Thiyagu is a 1990 Indian Tamil-language drama film directed by S. P. Muthuraman and written by Sivasankari. Produced by AVM Productions, it is based on the TV series Oru Manithanin Kathai, itself based on Sivasankari's novel by the same name. The film stars Raghuvaran, reprising his role from the series. It was released on 5 October 1990, and failed commercially.

== Cast ==
- Raghuvaran as Thiyagu
- Nizhalgal Ravi as Nana
- S. P. Balasubrahmanyam as Dr. Reddy
- Rekha
- Devilalitha as Thiyagu's wife
- Sudha
- Dilip as Arvind
- Babloo

== Production ==
When M. Saravanan of AVM Productions met Charuhasan, he asked about controlling budget in art films for which Charuhasan said the film costs can be recovered after selling rights for national television for which they provide ₹8 lakh (equivalent to ₹78 lakh or US$93,000 in 2023), which impressed Saravanan and he decided to make a "purposeful movie". Oru Manithanin Kathai, a novel written by Sivasankari and serialised in the magazine Ananda Vikatan from 1978 to 1979, was adapted into a TV series by the same name in 1985 and starred Raghuvaran. AVM later decided to adapt this series into a feature film titled Thiyagu; Raghuvaran returned in the same role, and S. P. Muthuraman was hired as director. Muthuraman charged no fee for the film.

== Soundtrack ==
The music was composed by Shankar–Ganesh.

No.	Title	Singer(s)	Length
1.	"Suttum Vizhi Chudar"	S. P. Balasubrahmanyam
2.	"Idhu Oru Manithanin"	S. P. Balasubrahmanyam

== Release and reception ==
Thiyagu was released on 5 October 1990. The film was screened for the then Chief Minister of Tamil Nadu M. Karunanidhi who liked it. A filmed speech of his was attached to the final cut. The government issued a notice saying that people can come and watch for free in theatres. Despite this, it failed commercially and won no awards. Saravanan revealed when he wanted to sell the satellite rights to Doordarshan, they refused, saying the film lacked "entertainment value". Despite giving the satellite rights to Sun TV, it never aired in the channel. Saravanan worried that the film which was intended to propagate the ill-effects of alcoholism did not reach the audience.

== Bibliography ==
- Saravanan, M. (2013) [2005]. AVM 60 Cinema (in Tamil) (3rd ed.). Rajarajan Pathippagam. OCLC 1158347612.
