= Dhool Parakuthu =

- Directed by: K. Hariharan
- Story by: Ramani
- Produced by: Chithra Ilangovan (Note: Though the film credits Chithra Ilangovan as producer, Hariharan in the book mentioned the film was produced by Sivasubramanian, brother of Rajakannu who produced 16 Vayathinile.)
- Starring: Raghuvaran; Ramya Krishnan
- Cinematography: Dharma
- Edited by: K. Rasun
- Music by: M. S. Viswanathan
- Production company: Sri Sabarimala Enterprises
- Release date: October 2, 1993
- Country: India
- Language: Tamil

Dhool Parakuthu is a 1993 Indian Tamil-language action film directed by K. Hariharan, starring Raghuvaran. The film was released after being in production hell for five years.

== Plot ==
Aarumugam, a man with a golden heart, is loved by Ramya Krishnan. Aarumugam's family gets killed by Malaysia Vasudevan and his henchmen. Aarumugam wants to take the law into his hands, but he is stopped by his police officer friend Ravi Raghavendra. Will Aarumugam complete his revenge form the climax.

== Cast ==
- Raghuvaran as Aarumugam
- Ramya Krishnan
- Sindhuja
- Malaysia Vasudevan
- S. S. Chandran
- Senthil
- Kovai Sarala
- Balambika
- T. S. Raghavendra
- G. Srinivasan
- Ravi Raghavendra as a police officer

== Production ==
The film marked the second collaboration of director Hariharan and Raghuvaran after Ezhavathu Manithan (1982). It was Hariharan's first attempt at making mainstream cinema. The film began production in July 1988; however the film was stopped by the producer after first schedule then second schedule began in 1990 and was again stopped. Hariharan expressed disinterest in making this film; however he managed to complete the film in 1993, five years since it began, after the producer threatened him by sending his men to his home.

== Soundtrack ==
Soundtrack was composed by M. S. Viswanathan.

Track listing
No.	Title	Singer(s)	Length
1.	"Jillena Veesutho"	K. J. Yesudas
2.	"Andhi Minnal"	S. P. Balasubrahmanyam, K. S. Chithra
3.	"Nee Kattati Naan"	K. S. Chithra

== Release ==
The film was released at Casino Theatre and was removed after few days due to film's poor response. Hariharan revealed he was exhausted and depressed while making this film, due to the protracted production period, and the reason for the film's failure is the story got messed up due to producer's intervention.
