= Manthira Punnagai (1986 film) =

- Theatrical release poster
- Directed by: V. Thamizhazhagan
- Screenplay by: P. L. Sundarrajan; V. Thamizhazhagan
- Story by: Sathya Movies Story Department
- Produced by: G. Thyagarajan; V. Thamizhazhagan
- Starring: Sathyaraj; Nadhiya
- Cinematography: Ramachandra Babu
- Edited by: K. R. Krishnan
- Music by: Ilaiyaraaja
- Production company: Sathya Movies
- Distributed by: Metro Movies
- Release date: 11 December 1986
- Country: India
- Language: Tamil

Manthira Punnagai (transl. Magical Smile) is a 1986 Indian Tamil-language film directed by V. Thamizhazhagan in his debut; he co-produced with G. Thyagarajan. The film stars Sathyaraj and Nadhiya, with Raghuvaran, Baby Sujitha, Thengai Srinivasan, Senthil, Jai Jagadish, Bob Christo and V. S. Raghavan in supporting roles. It was released on 11 December 1986.

== Plot ==
Sathyaraj comes across a mute child abandoned by her mother and starts bringing her up to be a police officer. She starts investigating Sathyaraj’s criminal activities and how she handles the scene makes the story interesting.

== Cast ==
- Sathyaraj in a dual role as
  - Dr. Bhaskar
  - DSP Arunachalam IPS
- Nadhiya as Geetha and Sheela
- Raghuvaran as Dhairiyaraj
- Baby Sujitha
- Thengai Srinivasan
- Senthil
- Jai Jagadish
- Bob Christo
- V. S. Raghavan

== Production ==
Manthira Punnagai is the directorial debut of V. Thamizhazhagan. Both the lead stars, Sathyaraj and Nadhiya, play dual roles each. Cinematography was handled by Ramachandra Babu, and editing by K. R. Krishnan.

== Soundtrack ==
The music was composed by Ilaiyaraaja. The song "Kaali Perungaaya Dappa" is set to the Carnatic raga Vachaspati. The disco-themed "Pavala Malligai" attained popularity.

Track listing
No.	Title	Lyrics	Singer(s)	Length
1.	"Manthira Punnagaiyo"	Na. Kamarasan	S. Janaki	4:37
2.	"Pavala Malligai"	Na. Kamarasan	Malaysia Vasudevan, K. S. Chithra	4:35
3.	"Kaali Perungaaya Dappa"	Ilaiyaraaja	Ilaiyaraaja	4:18
4.	"Naan Kathalil Oru"	Na. Kamarasan	P. Jayachandran	4:32
Total length:				18:02

== Release and reception ==
Manthira Punnagai was released on 11 December 1986, and distributed by Metro Movies. Jayamanmadhan of Kalki unfavourably reviewed the film but praised the music and said since Thamizhazhagan overly desired to give a lot in his debut film, Manthira Punnagai (magical smile) became a Mandha Punnagai (dull smile) full of yawns and concluded "Better luck next time!". Balumani of Anna praised acting, music, dialogues and direction but felt the film would have attained Himalayan victory if the story was more strong.
