= K. Hariharan (director) =

Indian film director

- Born: Mumbai, Maharashtra, India
- Occupations: Film director, Writer, Professor
- Years active: 44
- Spouse: Dr Rama Hariharan
- Awards: National Award for Best Tamil Film 1983, Afro Asian Solidarity Award, Moscow

K. Hariharan is an Indian film director who has directed films in Tamil, Marathi and Hindi. Until 2021 he was the professor of Film Studies at Krea University. Born in Mumbai, Maharashtra, his father H.Krishnan was the Senior Vice President of Eastman Kodak. An alumnus of the Film and Television Institute of India (FTII), Hariharan formed "Yukt Film Co-operative" in 1976 together with his batch mates to make an experimental film called Ghashiram Kotwal (film). Ezhavathu Manithan, his directorial debut in Tamil cinema, won the National Film Award for Best Feature Film in Tamil and was nominated for Golden St. George (Best Film) at the Moscow International Film Festival.

== Biography ==
Born in Mumbai, Maharashtra, Hariharan completed a basic degree in commerce from Poddar College, Mumbai and later joined the Film and Television Institute of India (FTII), Pune to do a course in screen-writing and direction. His father, H Krishnan a qualified cinematographer also served the Eastman Kodak as its vice-president. After passing out of the FTII, Hariharan formed "Yukt Films Co-operative" together with his batch mates that included Saeed Akhtar Mirza, Kamal Swaroop and their senior FTII alumni Mani Kaul. The co-operative made an experimental film in Marathi named Ghashiram Kotwal. Describing the film as "an esoteric piece of art", it was entered into the Berlin International Film Festival in 1978. The film was screened again at the festival in 2014 after being digitally restored. As a young film-maker Hariharan started making films for Children's Film Society (India). After that he started making children's films on the insistence of V. Shantaram, thus making Wanted Thangaraj (1979) which also was his directional debut in Tamil. After the release of the film, he relocated to Chennai and started working on Tamil films. His Ezhavathu Manithan, which marked Raghuvaran's debut, won the National Film Award for Best Feature Film in Tamil and the Afro-Asian solidarity award. The film was also nominated for Golden St. George (Best Film) Award at the 35th Moscow International Film Festival. In 1991, he made his Bollywood debut through Current that starred Om Puri and Deepti Naval in the lead. Made on a shoestring budget, the film focused on the plight of farmers in India.

He has served on several film festival juries such as Warsaw Film Festival, Tallinn International Film Festival, Cinemalaya Film Festival, Jeonju Film Festival, IFFK Kerala, Indian National Film Awards.

In August 2024, Hariharan released his first book titled 'Kamal Haasan- A Cinematic Journey' published by Harper Collins India. The book, a deep contextual analysis of the superstar's films, featured at several book festivals such as the ones held in Chennai, Hyderabad and Ooty. After registering good sales, a paperback version has now been released.

Hariharan is married to Dr. Rama Hariharan and resides in Chennai. He was the director of L.V. Prasad Film and TV Academy, Chennai. Last service as the Professor of Creative Arts and Director Media Lab at Krea University. He is also a visiting faculty at FTII, and the universities of Pennsylvania and Miami. He is a former director of L. V. Prasad Film and TV Academy, Chennai and the dean at Mahindra Ecole Centrale, Hyderabad. After teaching at Ashoka University, Sonepat, Haryana, he was the Director, Media Lab at KREA University until Feb 2021. As the trustee of Dharithree in Bengaluru and Garden of Peace School in Kaniyambadi, Vellore is presently in updating the curriculum and pedagogy of these two rural schools using advanced Digital technologies like AI, AR/VR etc.

== Filmography ==
- Wanted Thangaraj (1979)
- Ezhavathu Manithan (1982)
- Current (1992)
- Dhool Parakuthu (1993)
- Dubashi (1999)

== Awards ==
Won

- 1983 – Ezhavathu Manithan – National Film Award for Best Feature Film in Tamil – National Film Award

Nominated

- 1983 – Ezhavathu Manithan – Golden St. George (Best Film) – Moscow International Film Festival
