= Arohan (film) =

- Directed by: Shyam Benegal
- Written by: Shama Zaidi
- Starring: Om Puri; Victor Banerjee; Pankaj Kapoor
- Cinematography: Govind Nihalani
- Edited by: Bhanudas Divakar
- Music by: Purna Das Baul
- Release date: 1982
- Running time: 144 minutes
- Country: India
- Language: Hindi

Arohan (transl. Ascent, Climbing, Rising, or Mounting) is a 1982 Indian Hindi film by Shyam Benegal, starring Victor Banerjee and Om Puri in the lead roles with Dipti Bhatt as Hari's wife.

== Plot ==
Hari Mondal (Om Puri) is a poor farmer who lives in the remote Bengal village of Giripur in Birbhum district with his wife, two sons, brother, an old widowed aunt Kalidashi (Gita Sen) and her daughter Panchi. The movie opens in the mid sixties when the Naxalbari uprising is spreading across Bengal and oppressed farmers are being united by youths who believe in communism and a socialist republic.

Hari and his brother Bolai (Noni Ganguly) are Borgadars, land tillers who plough and harvest the crop on land owned by the Jotdars. Bibhutibhushan Ganguly (Victor Banerjee) is the young jotdar who has just lost his father and now wishes to employ new laws on his Borgadars ensuring his greatest profit while the poor farmer languishes in poverty. His estate agent Karmakar (Rajen Tarafdar) does most of his dirty dealings on his behalf that include keeping the poor villagers scared and him in command. Hari's sister is about to get married and Hari asks Bibhutibhushan for a loan. Bibhutibhushan asks him to not register his Bargadari rights under the government office in exchange. Hari is naive and moulded under generations of servility and oppression to realise that his basic rights are being squandered, although his younger brother Bolai isn't happy remaining as mere servants to the landlord. Bolai protests on multiple occasions only to be reprimanded by his brother and Karmakar. Bolai and Panchi (Sreela Majumdar) love each other.

Over time, as the communist movement gets stronger in the region, Hari Mondal is oppressed under whims and fancies of the Jotdar, that include making him a paid labourer on his own plot of land and sacking his brother from working with him. Bolai is disgusted with the village life and moves to the big city of Calcutta for work. Here, he joins a small-time racket of wagon breakers and eventually becomes a political goon for the city's electoral candidates. Panchi and her mother both move to Calcutta with help from strangers who offer them employment. While Kalidashi gets employed in a middle-class home as the cook and servant for a meager salary, her daughter is trapped with the bait of fancy clothes by a pimp employed by a middle aged Marwari businessman who makes her his mistress. Panchi also seems to enjoy her new life and the luxuries of cosmetics, silk sarees and a huge bed to sleep on. In a poignant scene, before bedding her for the first time, the businessman asks her whether she has ever slept on a bed before.

Hari fights his battles alone against the Jotdar and eventually registers a case against him in the district court with help from sympathetic village master (Pankaj Kapoor) and a lawyer who fights his case for free. Although the district magistrate (Jayant Kripalani) is sympathetic and just in his dealing with his cause, the Jotdar uses his muscle to beat up Hari, burn down his house and take away his bullocks thus leaving him helpless to fight.

Hari presses on and the case reaches the High Court, where his case is declared in favour of the Jotdar. Meanwhile, the first leftist communist government is established in Bengal and after years of court battle and a Panchayat election where Hari defeats Karmakar to become the village Panch, he receives his Bargadari certificate—at the cost of a broken leg, a house, and a brother who is lost forever.

Hari comes to look for Bolai in the great metropolis of Calcutta and searches for him fruitlessly before going back to his village. He never gets to know what has happened of his people who came to Calcutta. The audience gets to know that Bolai gets life imprisonment for committing a political murder, Panchi is thrown out of her Sethji's flat when she gets pregnant and is forced to abort the baby. Her health deteriorates, she goes into shock and becomes insane and is living on the streets. Kalidashi dies while working in her master's house, presumably over a broken heart at her daughter's condition, having seen her both as a mistress and a vagabond on the road. Hari himself dies a few months later in 1980.

== Cast ==
- Victor Banerjee as Jotdar Bibhutibhushan Ganguly
- Om Puri as Hari Mondal
- Pankaj Kapur as Village Teacher
- Noni Ganguly as Bolai Mondal, Hari's younger brother
- Sreela Majumdar as Panchi
- Khokha Mukherji as Hassan Mallah
- Gita Sen as Kalidashi, Hari's aunt
- Jayant Kripalani as Senior District Magistrate Jayant Kripalani
- Rajen Tarafder as Karmakar, Bibhutibhushan's Estate Agent
- Dipti Bhatt as Hari's wife
- Amrish Puri as Judge in High Court

== Awards ==
- 1982 National Film Award for Best Actor: Om Puri
- 1982 National Film Award for Best Feature Film in Hindi : Shyam Benegal
