= Dubashi =

- Directed by: K. Hariharan
- Starring: Raja Krishnamoorthy; Dhaneshwar Rao; B.S.Karthik; Usha; Nassar; Delhi Ganesh
- Release date: 1999
- Running time: 96 min
- Country: India
- Language: Hindi

Dubashi (Meaning: The Translator) is a 1999 Indian children's film directed by K Hariharan and produced by the Children's Film Society of India (CFSI).

It tells the story of Gopal Roa, a 12-year-old boy and his desire to get a bicycle. The Film explores the undying spirit of a young boy and how he helps the family cope with the day-to-day crisis, He motivates his brother, co-operates with his father and acts as a source of inspiration.

== Plot ==
The story revolves around Gopal Rao, a 12-year-old boy who is intelligent, an extrovert, confident and has a flair for languages. His father Rama Rao (Raja Krishnamoorthy) is a clerk-cum-translator who has retired. They are a descendant of a Marathi family settled in Thanjavur. His elder brother Raghu, is the other side of the coin, inclined towards Sculpture and an introvert.

Gopal's dream is to have his own bicycle. Rahgu's bicycle is damaged in a road accident. Raghu and Rama Rao tell Gopal that the Government has put up and policy that all old bicycles would be taken over by the government and will be replaced by new cycles. One day While searching for firewood, Gopal find out the part of the broken cycle and realizes that his father and brother have lied to him. He then decides to rebuild the cycle on his own. One day while searching a scrapyard for spares, he comes across a group of thugs who chase him. Gopal runs away and goes to a temple where he meets two Japanese Tourists and the Thanjore King. The Japanese tourists are on India tour for their research work on Indian Sculpture. Gopal uses this opportunity and takes them to his home. The Couple visit Gopal's home and ask Rama Rao's permission to take Raghu. Rahgu is initially hesitant but Gopal convinces his brother to take up the job as a Guide to Japanese Couple due to impressive knowledge on Sculpture.

Meanwhile, Rama Rao and Gopal help the neighbors by translating the telecast of television serial Ramayan into Tamil. This goes on few days till Rama Rao falls ill. The Family Doctor (Delhi Ganesh) advises him to stop his translation as this would further aggravate his sickness. The Tanjore Maharaja meanwhile finds a number of literary work which he has inherited and most of it being in Marathi. He wishes to translate to Tamil and make it popular. On Inquiry he finds about Rama Roa's family and visits them. The King offers Rama Rao work at the Royal Palace. Raghu and the Japanese couple return to Tanjore after a long southern Indian Tour. Raghu's mother is pleasantly surprised to find that her elder son Raghu had slowly overcome his introvert character and become more confident. He is fluent in English and also learns few Japanese words from the couple.

The film ends on a positive note with Raghu getting a bicycle for Gopal and Rama Rao taking up the Job of translating the literary work at the Royal Palace.

== Cast ==
- Raja Krishnamoorthy as Rama Rao, a translator by profession. Rama Rao's ancestors are originally from Maharashtra and later generations has settle in Tanjore.
- Dhaneshwar Rao as Gopal Rao, 11-year-old boy which intelligent, witty and good in Languages.
- B.S.Karthik as Raghu, ender brother of Gopal, an introvert but could not complete his education due to his stammering problem. But has excellent knowledge of Indian sculpture and also trained in sculpting.
- Usha as Wife of Rama Rao
- Nasser as Tanjore Maharaja
- Delhi Ganesh as the Family Doctor
