= 47 Natkal =

1981 film by K. Balachander

- Poster of the Tamil version
- Directed by: K. Balachander
- Screenplay by: K. Balachander
- Based on: 47 Natkal by Sivasankari
- Produced by: R. Venkataraman
- Starring: Chiranjeevi; Jaya Prada; Anne Patricia
- Cinematography: B. S. Lokanath
- Edited by: N. R. Kittu
- Music by: M. S. Viswanathan
- Production company: Premalaya Pictures
- Release dates: 17 July 1981 (Tamil); 3 September 1981 (Telugu)
- Country: India
- Languages: Tamil; Telugu

47 Natkal (transl. 47 days) is a 1981 Indian thriller film written and directed by K. Balachander. It was simultaneously made in Tamil and Telugu with the latter version titled 47 Rojulu (transl. 47 days). The film stars Chiranjeevi, Jaya Prada, and Anne Patricia. Based on the novel of the same name by Sivasankari, it revolves around Vishali (Jaya Prada) and how her marriage to Kumar (Chiranjeevi) lasts only 47 days. The Tamil version was released on 17 July 1981, and the Telugu version on 3 September 1981.

== Plot ==
Actress Saritha comes to a small town to meet Vishali, whom she wishes to play in a film based on her life. Vishali, however, gets hysterical and angrily shuts out Saritha. Vishali's brother then tells Saritha about his sister's marriage to Kumar, which lasted 47 days.

Kumar, who has been living in France, insists on marrying a small-town girl. He thus marries Vishali and takes her to Férolles, a town 30 km away from Paris, where he lives in a country manor. Vishali, a naïve and simple country girl, cannot understand French or English, and has never stepped on foreign soil before. Unknown to her, Kumar is already married to Lucy, a French doctor, living on the top floor of the same house. He deceives both his wives: he lies to Vishali that Lucy is a good friend and their landlady, while he tells Lucy that Vishali is his sister, whom he brought there as she is recently widowed and thus, mentally disturbed. Vishali begins to suspect Kumar's relationship with Lucy. She finally questions him and finds out about his bigamy. Kumar tries to convince her by telling her that he had married Lucy only for her money, which he eventually plans to take control of and then divorce her. Vishali disagrees to his deceitful motives and refuses to stay with him as his second wife/ mistress. However, living in an unknown foreign land and not knowing anyone with whom she can communicate for help, she reluctantly plays along with Kumar who makes her act as his mentally deranged sister in front of Lucy.

Thereafter, Kumar forbids her from trying to talk to anyone and punishes her for attempting to escape once, by burning her palm on the stove, harassing her sadistically. He even torments her mentally by taking her to watch a porn film and coerces her into sex before letting her read a letter from her brother. A Tamil-speaking pickpocket (Rama Prabha) sees Kumar abusing Vishali at a restaurant one day, and meets her privately to help her. On hearing of Vishali's predicament, she speaks to an Indian doctor named Shankar (Sarath Babu) and requests him to help Vishali. Shankar, who is in Paris for a conference, had heard about Vishali from an Indian friend's wife, through a note written by Vishali in Tamil and handed over to the lady, who did not know her language.

Kumar is introduced to Dr. Shankar by Lucy, when they are at the same hotel. Vishali then reveals to Kumar that she is pregnant. Disturbed on hearing the news, Kumar is afraid that Lucy will discover his deception. So, he tries to force Vishali to have a hurried and unsafe abortion, but she manages to escape from his clutches. Kumar pursues her but Dr. Shanker rescues her in time and confronts Kumar, taking Vishali safely away from him, and informs Lucy about Kumar's bigamy before leaving for India. When Kumar meets Lucy, she ends their marriage by throwing her wedding ring into the river, and leaves him for good. Dr. Shanker brings Vishali back to India, reuniting her with her family. No further mention is made of her pregnancy and no baby is seen or heard. It is presumed that she may have later had an abortion, since she did not want to be connected to her ex-husband Kumar in any way whatsoever.

When Saritha asks Vishali why she didn't remarry (perhaps her rescuer Dr. Shankar), Vishali, clearly offended, angrily replies that a woman does not always have to be married or exist only for a man's pleasure. However, she placates Saritha by saying that she wouldn't mind if her character is shown as remarried in the film, when made.

== Cast ==
- Chiranjeevi as Kumar
- Jaya Prada as Vaishali
- Anne Patricia as Lucy
- Rama Prabha as the pickpocket
- Jayasri
- Prameela
- Varalakshmi
- Sarath Babu as Shankar
- Nazeem
- Chakrapani
- Ramana Murthi
- G. P. Ramanath
- Saritha as herself (uncredited)

== Production ==
While completing the shoot of Ninaithale Inikkum (1979) at Singapore, R. Venkatraman of Premalaya Pictures expressed his desire to K. Balachander of producing a film made in foreign locations which had not been exploited by anyone yet. Balachander decided to adapt the novel 47 Natkal as the film. The novel by Sivasankari was serialised in the magazine Idayam Pesukirathu. Sivasankari is also credited for the film's dialogues. The film marked Telugu actor Chiranjeevi's Tamil debut, and was simultaneously filmed in Telugu as 47 Rojulu. Delhi Ganesh dubbed Chiranjeevi's voice in the Tamil version, and Saritha did so for Jaya Prada. Saritha also briefly appears as herself. Unlike the novel which was set in the United States, Balachander decided to change the film's setting to Paris to make use of the ancient arts, buildings and modern conditions of that country came together to form the plot of the screenplay. Major filming was held in Paris and its surroundings and was completed within 35 days.

== Soundtrack ==
The soundtrack was composed by M. S. Viswanathan, while the Tamil lyrics were penned by Kannadasan. For the Telugu version, the lyrics were penned by Aatreya.

Tamil
No.	Title	Singer(s)	Length
1.	"Maan Kanda Sorgangal"	S. P. Balasubrahmanyam	8:13
2.	"Thottu Kattiya Maappillai"	S. P. Balasubrahmanyam, Vani Jairam	7:21
3.	"Ival Unai Ninaikkum Podhe"	Vani Jairam	4:00
Total length:			19:34

Telugu
No.	Title	Singer(s)	Length
1.	"O.. Paidi Ledemma"	S. P. Balasubrahmanyam	8:33
2.	"Alanti Ilanti Ammayini Kanu"	Vani Jairam	3:37
3.	"Sutram Kattadabbayi"	S. P. Balasubrahmanyam, Vani Jairam	7:33
Total length:			19:43

== Release and reception ==
47 Natkal was released on 17 July 1981, and 47 Rojulu on 3 September 1981. Sindhu and Jeeva of Kalki negatively reviewed 47 Natkal, saying it was not as entertaining or exciting as the novel.
