= Kavacham (1992 film) =

- Poster designed by Gayathri Ashokan
- Directed by: K. Madhu
- Starring: Raghuvaran; Captain Raju; Babu Antony; Mohan Raj; Parvathy Jayaram; Janardhanan
- Release date: 28 February 1992
- Running time: 130 minutes
- Country: India
- Language: Malayalam

Kavacham is a 1992 Malayalam Indian film directed by K. Madhu, starring Raghuvaran in the lead role. The film was much expected to succeed since director K. Madhu teamed up with Raghuvaran, who gave a hit in Malayalam Vyooham.

== Plot ==
Kavacham follows two friends, Raghuvaran and Captain Raju, who work as private detectives. Their characters were modelled on Mandrake and Lothar, Mandrake's best friend and crimefighting companion, respectively.

== Cast ==
- Raghuvaran
- Captain Raju
- Babu Antony
- Parvathy Jayaram
- Mohan Raj
- Karamana Janardanan Nair
- Rajan P Dev
- Babu Namboothiri
- Ramachandran
- Alex Mathew
