= Current (1992 film) =

Current करंट
- Directed by: K. Hariharan
- Screenplay by: Onkarnath Mishra
- Story by: Ki. Rajanarayanan
- Produced by: National Film Development Corporation of India
- Starring: Om Puri; Deepti Naval; Shreeram Lagoo
- Cinematography: Dharmma
- Music by: L. Vaidyanathan
- Distributed by: National Film Development Corporation of India
- Release date: 14 February 1992
- Country: India
- Language: Hindi

Current (transl. Electricity Supply) is a 1992 Indian Hindi language drama film. The film was co-written and directed by K. Hariharan, in his Hindi cinema debut, for the National Film Development Corporation of India. Starring Om Puri and Deepti Naval in the lead, the film focused on the plight of a farmer in rural India. The plot of the movie was based on a short story written by Ki. Rajanarayanan, a Sahitya Akademi winner (Tamil).

== Plot ==
The film reveals the life and struggle of a farmer, who is tired of dealing with the corrupt systems in bureaucracy and politics at that time in India. Velu is a simple and poor sugarcane farmer. He owns an electric pump set to irrigate his farm. Due to unavoidable reasons, he once pays his electricity bill late. He has a lot of trust in the establishment and hence trusts that the Electricity Board will overlook his late payment. however, the Board instead disconnects his electricity supply. Velu and his wife are left distressed and helpless due to this.

== Cast ==
- Om Puri as Velu, the farmer
- Deepti Naval as Sita, Velu's wife
- Shreeram Lagoo
- Savita Prabhune as Radha
- Achyut Potdar
- Deepak Qazir
