= Raghuvaran =

Indian actor (1958-2008)

- Born: Raghuvaran Velayuthan Nair; 11 December 1958; Kollengode, Kerala, India
- Died: 19 March 2008 (aged 49); Chennai, Tamil Nadu, India
- Occupation: Actor
- Years active: 1982-2008
- Spouse: Rohini (m. 1996; div. 2004)
- Children: 1

Raghuvaran Velayuthan Nair (11 December 1958 – 19 March 2008) was an Indian actor who predominantly acted in films made in South India. He has acted in more than 200 Tamil, Telugu, Malayalam, Kannada and Hindi films. According to the Hindustan Times, "the actor had carved a niche for himself with his special style and voice modulation."

He played the protagonist of a Tamil soap opera, Oru Manithanin Kathai, about a well-to-do man who becomes an alcoholic. He received critical acclaim for his role as Father Alphonso in the Malayalam movie Daivathinte Vikruthikal, directed by Lenin Rajendran and based on M. Mukundan's novel of the same name.

Raghuvaran's six-song music album, composed and sung by him, were officially released by actor Rajinikanth and the album was received by actress Rohini and Raghuvaran's son Rishi Varan.

== Personal life ==
Raghuvaran Velayuthan Nair was born on 11 December 1958 as the eldest among four children at Kollengode in Palakkad district in Kerala. He was the grandson of Mr. N. Radhakrishnan Nair and son of Chunkamannathu N. R. Velayudhan Nair and Kasthuri Chakkungal. When his father moved his hotel business from Mathur to Coimbatore, the family shifted to Coimbatore. He had his primary education from Stanes Anglo Indian Higher Secondary School, Coimbatore. He also learned piano from Trinity College London.

He discontinued his Bachelor of Arts in history from Coimbatore (Government Arts College) to pursue a career in acting.

From 1979 to 1983, he was part of an acting drama troupe in Chennai, Chennai Kings, which also included the Tamil actor, Nassar. He was spotted and cast as the lead actor in Ezhavathu Manithan, which was his biggest role to date.

He married Rohini in 1996 and their son Rishi Varan was born in 2000. The couple later separated and divorced in 2004.

== Career ==
Following his beginnings on the stage, and a diploma in acting from M.G.R. Government Film and Television Training Institute in Chennai, Raghuvaran approached many Kollywood studios aiming for performance oriented roles and finally got selected as hero. The offbeat film named Ezhavathu Manithan (Seventh Man), directed by Hariharan won many awards, but not many offers for him. A few more films followed with him as hero, like Oru Odai Nadhiyagirathu and Nee Thodumbothu released, but did not become successes. The villain role in Silk Silk Silk was noticed and the film's success opened the gate of offers for him. The villain act continued in films like Kutravaaligal, Mr. Bharath, Manthira Punnagai, Poovizhi Vasalile, Makkal En Pakkam, Oorkavalan and Puriyaadha Pudhir.

Raghuvaran did many films as hero and most of them did good business as well. The films Kavithai Paada Neramillai, Koottu Puzhukkal and Michael Raj helped to stabilize his career. The police officer in Thaimel Aanai (1988), the rowdy with a golden heart in Kai Naattu (1988), the lawyer in Kaliyugam (1988), the common man in En Vazhi Thani Vazhi (1988) and the honest Medical student turned Goonda in Kuttravali (1989) helped Raghuvaran's market value as hero to reach greater heights. But his desire to try all types of roles, like supporting actor as well as villain simultaneously halted the progress as hero, even though he played hero roles in Anjali (1990) and Malayalam movies Vyooham (1990) followed by Kavacham (1992). Raghuvaran featured as the bad guy in big-ticket Tamil films like Shankar's films Kaadhalan (1994) and Mudhalvan (1999).

Raghuvaran was pitted against Dilip Kumar in his Bollywood debut Izzatdaar (1990) and his popularity further soared at the national level with Ram Gopal Varma's gangster flick Shiva (1990), where he played the dreaded gangster Bhawani. Other Bollywood films include Rakshak (1996) opposite Sunil Shetty (1996), Hitler (1998) opposite Mithun Chakraborty, Lal Baadshah (1999) opposite Amitabh Bachchan. and Grahan along with Jackie Shroff, where he replaced a busy Nana Patekar in 2001.

Known for playing the antagonist in a number of box office hits during the course of his career, he shared screen space with several big names in Tamil cinema, with his most memorable on-screen foe being none other than 'Superstar' Rajinikanth. The duo had appeared together in Mr. Bharath (1986), Oorkavalan (1987), Manithan (1987), Siva (1989), Raja Chinna Roja (1989), Baashha (1995), Muthu (1995), Arunachalam (1997) and Sivaji (2007).

He later returned to supporting roles – sometimes as a father or as a mentor in films such as Run (2002), Bala (2002), Alai (2003), Thirumalai (2003) and Yaaradi Nee Mohini (2008).

== Death ==
Raghuvaran died on 19 March 2008, aged 49. The cause of death was due to organ failure because of excessive alcohol consumption. His death occurred during the filming stages of several films, including Kanthaswamy (2009), wherein Raghuvaran's portions were reshot with Ashish Vidyarthi, which resulted in the film's delayed release. His posthumous film, Aatadista, released shortly after his death.

== Filmography ==
=== Tamil films ===
| Year | Film | Role | Notes |
|---|---|---|---|
| 1982 | Ezhavathu Manithan | Anand | |
| 1982 | Marumagale Vazhga | Dr. Saravanan | |
| 1983 | Silk Silk Silk | Ashok Kumar | |
| 1983 | Vasanthame Varuga | Suriyanarayanan | |
| 1983 | Oru Odai Nadhiyagirathu | Bhaskar | |
| 1984 | Nee Thodumbothu | | |
| 1985 | Kutravaaligal | | |
| 1985 | Engirunthalum Vazhga | | |
| 1986 | Mr. Bharath | Michael | |
| 1986 | Meendum Pallavi | Selvan | |
| 1986 | Samsaram Adhu Minsaram | Chidamabaram | |
| 1986 | Manthira Punnagai | Daniel Miranda | |
| 1987 | Poovizhi Vasalile | Anand | |
| 1987 | Megam Karuththirukku | Mathru Moorthy | |
| 1987 | Makkal En Pakkam | Ramesh | |
| 1987 | Kavithai Paada Neramillai | | |
| 1987 | Oorkavalan | Rajadurai | |
| 1987 | Koottu Puzhukkal | Surya | |
| 1987 | Manithan | Kumaravelu | |
| 1987 | Ivargal Varungala Thoongal | Raja | |
| 1987 | Puyal Paadum Paattu | Police Inspector | |
| 1987 | Arul Tharum Ayyappan | Person praying | Cameo appearance |
| 1987 | Kavalan Avan Kovalan | Himself | Guest appearance |
| 1987 | Michael Raj | Michael Raj | |
| 1988 | Annanagar Mudhal Theru | Janardhanan | |
| 1988 | Kuttravali | Raja | |
| 1988 | Irandil Ondru | Ragan | |
| 1988 | Thaimel Aanai | Vinod | |
| 1988 | En Bommukutty Ammavukku | Alex | |
| 1988 | Kai Naattu | Laber | |
| 1988 | Kaliyugam | Mahesh | |
| 1988 | Koyil Mani Osai | Rajavelu | |
| 1988 | En Vazhi Thani Vazhi | Advocate Raja | |
| 1989 | Siva | John | |
| 1989 | Idhu Unga Kudumbam | | |
| 1989 | Raja Chinna Roja | Bhaskar | |
| 1990 | Pagalil Pournami | Hindu saint | |
| 1990 | Anjali | Shekar | |
| 1990 | Puriyaadha Pudhir | Chakravarthi | |
| 1990 | Thiyagu | Thiyagu | |
| 1991 | Pudhiya Raagam | Raghuraman | |
| 1992 | Uyarnthavan | Bhaskhar | |
| 1993 | Konjum Kili | Dr. Izzet Peter | |
| 1993 | Pudhiya Mugam | Terrorist in Airport | Cameo appearance |
| 1993 | Dhool Parakuthu | Aarumugam | |
| 1994 | Paasamalargal | Bar customer | Cameo appearance |
| 1994 | Thozhar Pandian | | |
| 1994 | Kaadhalan | Mallikarjuna | |
| 1994 | Veera Padhakkam | Vadivelu | |
| 1995 | Baashha | Mark Antony | |
| 1995 | Manathile Oru Paattu | James | Cameo appearance |
| 1995 | Rani Maharani | | |
| 1995 | Witness | Ramesh | |
| 1995 | Kolangal | Bairavan | |
| 1995 | Muthu | Rajasekharan | |
| 1995 | Maa Manithan | Sigamani | |
| 1995 | Thotta Chinungi | Gopal | |
| 1996 | Take It Easy Urvashi | Jaya | |
| 1996 | Selva | Varatharajan | |
| 1997 | Arunachalam | Vishwanath | |
| 1997 | Love Today | Chandrasekar | |
| 1997 | Ullaasam | G. K. | |
| 1997 | Abhimanyu | Maasilamani | |
| 1997 | Nerukku Ner | Raghu | |
| 1997 | Aahaa..! | Raghuraman | |
| 1997 | Ratchagan | Gnaneswar | |
| 1998 | Thulli Thirintha Kaalam | Chidambaram | |
| 1998 | Iniyavale | Ramanathan | |
| 1998 | Poonthottam | Panneerselvam | |
| 1998 | Nilaave Vaa | Siva | |
| 1999 | Suriya Paarvai | Jayanth | |
| 1999 | En Swasa Kaatre | Pandian | |
| 1999 | Endrendrum Kadhal | Shekar | |
| 1999 | Oruvan | Krishna Prasad | |
| 1999 | Amarkkalam | Tulasi Das | |
| 1999 | Pooparika Varugirom | Ranganathan | |
| 1999 | Mudhalvan | Aranganathan | |
| 1999 | Iraniyan | Aande | |
| 2000 | Kannukkul Nilavu | Dr. Rajasekhar | |
| 2000 | Good Luck | Chandra Mohan | |
| 2000 | Mugavaree | Shiva | |
| 2000 | Sudhandhiram | Raghu | |
| 2000 | Vallarasu | DGP Jaganathan | |
| 2000 | Kandukondain Kandukondain | Sowmya's Boss | |
| 2000 | Parthen Rasithen | Panneer | |
| 2000 | Uyirile Kalanthathu | Raghuraman | |
| 2001 | Dosth | Raghu | |
| 2001 | Narasimha | Raana | |
| 2001 | Star | Dhanushkodi | |
| 2001 | Majunu | Gajapathy | |
| 2002 | Red | Sethupathy | |
| 2002 | Dhaya | Major Rudhraiya | |
| 2002 | Roja Kootam | Ilango's father | |
| 2002 | Run | Shiva's brother-in-law | |
| 2002 | University | Tamilselvan | |
| 2002 | I Love You Da | Rajkishore | |
| 2002 | Bala | Jeyamani | |
| 2002 | Kadhal Virus | Kavitha's father | |
| 2003 | Alaudin | Gangadhar | |
| 2003 | Alai | Aathi's father | |
| 2003 | Kaiyodu Kai | Manickavasagam | |
| 2003 | Anjaneya | Venketeswaran | |
| 2003 | Thirumalai | Artist | |
| 2003 | Anbe Un Vasam | V. Rathinavel Pandian | |
| 2004 | Jana | Jana's father | |
| 2004 | Arasatchi | Ashok Mehta | |
| 2004 | Jananam | Udhaya Moorthy | |
| 2005 | Sachein | Gowtham | |
| 2006 | Sivappathigaram | Elango | |
| 2007 | Deepavali | Dr. Devasaghayam | Cameo appearance |
| 2007 | Nalladhor Veenai | | |
| 2007 | Sivaji | Chezhian | |
| 2007 | Marudhamalai | Suryanarayanan | |
| 2008 | Bheemaa | Periyavar | |
| 2008 | Ashoka | Huzoor | |
| 2008 | Thodakkam | Vanchinathan | |
| 2008 | Sila Nerangalil | Krishnan | |
| 2008 | Yaaradi Nee Mohini | Vasu's father | Posthumous film |
| 2008 | Ellam Avan Seyal | Jagadeeswaran | Posthumous film |
| 2009 | Adada Enna Azhagu | Himself | Posthumous film; cameo appearance |
| 2012 | Ullam | Kavitha's father | Posthumous film; delayed release |

=== Telugu films ===
| Year | Film | Role | Notes |
|---|---|---|---|
| 1987 | Pasivadi Pranam | Venu | |
| 1987 | Jebu Donga | Teja | |
| 1988 | Kanchana Seeta | | |
| 1988 | Nyayaniki Sankellu | Dhanraj | |
| 1988 | Nyayaniki Siksha | Prajapathi Rao | |
| 1989 | Rudranetra | Black Cobra | |
| 1989 | Lankeshwarudu | | |
| 1989 | Shiva | Bhavani | |
| 1991 | Chaitanya | Raana | |
| 1992 | Lathi | Avinash | |
| 1992 | Prema Drohi | Drohi | |
| 1992 | Asadhyulu | Dr. Pratap | |
| 1994 | Captain | Kannappa Rao | Partially reshot in Tamil |
| 1995 | Mounam | Mr. X | |
| 1996 | Anaganaga Oka Roju | Raghu | |
| 1996 | Kranthi | | |
| 1998 | Aahaa..! | Raghuram | |
| 1998 | Suswagatham | Dr. Chandra Shekar | |
| 1999 | Anaganaga Oka Ammai | Bhavani Prasad | |
| 2000 | Pelli Sambandham | | |
| 2000 | Azad | Deva | |
| 2002 | Seema Simham | Visweswara Rao | |
| 2002 | Bobby | K. R. | |
| 2003 | Naaga | Naaga's father | |
| 2003 | Johnny | Ravishankar Damle | |
| 2004 | Naani | Scientist | |
| 2004 | Mass | Satya | |
| 2006 | Valliddari Vayasu Padahare | Shekhar | |
| 2007 | Evadaithe Nakenti | Bal Gangadhar | |
| 2008 | Aatadista | Raghunath | Posthumous film |
| 2008 | Pellikani Prasad | | Posthumous film |
| 2009 | Bank | Raghuvaran | Posthumous film |

=== Malayalam films ===
| Year | Film | Role | Notes |
|---|---|---|---|
| 1982 | Kakka | | |
| 1983 | Rugma | Joseph | |
| 1989 | Dhanushkodi | | Unreleased film |
| 1990 | Vyooham | Tony Leous | |
| 1991 | Daivathinte Vikrithikal | Alphonso | |
| 1991 | Kizhakkan Pathrose | Anthony | |
| 1992 | Kavacham | Ravi | |
| 1992 | Soorya Manasam | Shivan | |
| 1993 | Addeham Enna Iddeham | Perera | |
| 1995 | Peter Scott | Leo Fernandes | |
| 1995 | Maanthrikam | Abdul Rahiman | |

=== Kannada films ===
| Year | Film | Role |
|---|---|---|
| 1996 | Circle Inspector | Ibrahim |
| 1997 | Kalavida | Prema's killer |
| 1998 | Jai Hind | |
| 1998 | Government | |
| 1998 | Kshamisi- Sorry | |
| 1999 | Prathyartha | Rakesh |
| 2001 | Asura | Tulasi |
| 2004 | Durgi | Jaydev |

=== Hindi films ===
| Year | Film | Role |
|---|---|---|
| 1990 | Izzatdaar | Indrajeet Sabharwal |
| 1990 | Shiva | Bhavani |
| 1996 | Rakshak | Raghu |
| 1998 | Hitler | Ankush Raj |
| 1999 | Lal Baadshah | Vikram Singh |
| 2001 | Grahan | Raghu Sinha |

=== Singer ===
| Year | Film | Song | Notes |
|---|---|---|---|
| 2008 | Thodakkam | "Edhuthan Mudiyadhu" | |

== Awards ==
- Winner, Tamil Nadu State Film Award for Best Villain for Mudhalvan (1999)

=== Honours ===
- Kalaimamani Award - 1998
