= Ezhavathu Manithan =

- Poster
- Directed by: K. Hariharan
- Written by: Somasundareshwar; Arunmozhi; (dialogues)
- Screenplay by: K. Hariharan
- Story by: Arunmozhi
- Produced by: Palai N. Shanmugam
- Starring: Raghuvaran; Rathna
- Cinematography: Dharmma
- Edited by: K. N. Raju
- Music by: L. Vaidyanathan
- Release date: 11 June 1982
- Running time: 120 minutes
- Country: India
- Language: Tamil

Ezhavathu Manithan (pronounced [eːɻaːʋaðu maniðan] transl. The Seventh Man) is a 1982 Indian Tamil-language film co-written and directed by K. Hariharan. Inspired by a real-life incident, the film focuses on environmental pollution and exploitation of industrial workers. Starring Raghuvaran in his first lead role, it features a host of newcomers playing other prominent roles. The film's soundtrack was made up from an album composed by L. Vaidyanathan with the lyrics of Tamil poet Subramania Bharati.

The film met with widespread critical acclaim upon release, winning the National Film Award for Best Feature Film in Tamil and two Tamil Nadu State Film Awards. It was screened at the Indian Panorama of the International Film Festival of India, and in the Soviet Union, where it won the Afro–Asian Solidarity Award. At the 13th Moscow International Film Festival in 1983, the film was nominated for the Golden St. George prize.

== Plot ==
Anand, a skilled engineering graduate, comes to a village from Madras to work in a cement factory. He is shocked when he learns about the exploitation and mistreatment of the workers there. Arjun, the corrupt manager of the factory, takes half of the wages from every worker as his commission. Anand complains to Ramkumar, the son of the factory owner, who used to be a college friend, and Ramkumar gives Arjun a warning. Meanwhile, Anand befriends Senthamari, a labourer in the factory, and is attracted to Gowri, Senthamari's sister.

Gowri has not told anyone that she is affected by a lung disease caused by air pollution. Sudhakar, another labourer in the factory, is affected by the same disease. Dr Prema, a government doctor, informs Sudhakar that the disease has advanced and he needs to be treated in Chennai. Kulashekara Perumal, the factory owner, refuses to provide treatment to Sudhakar, resulting in the latter's death. A distressed Anand pleads with the management to look into the issue and to provide the employees with benefits that they are entitled to receive, but he is refused.

Ramkumar tries to get the doctor who treated Sudhaker to issue a false certificate of death, but she refuses. Dr Prema also lets Anand know that she reported the death to the government health ministry, but nothing will be done about it because Ramkumar has bribed all the officials. Anand tries to speak with Ramkumar, but he beats him up. Anand establishes a union at the factory and calls a strike. When Senthamari leaves town to start another job, Ramkumar chases after him and murders him. The new factory manager, Settaya, arranges for Ramkumar to lay low in Chennai, while he buries Senthamari's body in the factory.

All the management's attempts to get Anand to call off the strike fail. Settaya files a police report against Anand, accusing him of the attempted murder of Ramkumar. He also promises the factory workers that he will build a new chimney to reduce the air pollution if they call off the strike. A lawyer who is supportive of the factory's trade union bails out Anand and alerts the government to the factory's poor environmental record. The management decides to blow up the factory and claim the insurance money. However, their plan backfires as Anand and his friends spot most of the bombs and dispose of them. The one bomb that they do not remove is in the room where Settaya is hiding; he dies in the subsequent blast. Anand and the rest of the workers assume control of the factory. Dr Prema informs Anand that Gowri will recover from her illness.

== Cast ==
- Raghuvaran as Anand
- Rathna as Gowri
- Deepak as Senthamarai
- Ranga as Ramkumar
- Anitha Mathews
- Roopa Sowda
- Ramanamurthy as Kulashekara Perumal
- Satish as Satish
- "Vathiyar" R. K. Raman as Subbiah
- Sathyajith
- S. Sathyendra

== Production ==
Director K. Hariharan was initially approached by Palai N. Shanmugam, a former Indian independence activist and a leading criminal lawyer from Tirunelveli, Tamil Nadu, to make a documentary film on the Tamil poet Subramania Bharati. The year 1982 marked the centenary of the poet. While carrying out research about Bharati, Hariharan felt Bharati was a "complicated character" and a film about him "would have to tell a few truths that people would not be too comfortable with". Shanmugam and Hariharan abandoned the project and decided to make a film based on a real-life incident that took place in a village in the same district which involved Shanmugam himself. He was fighting a case against a local cement factory in the locality that was polluting the air. Hariharan developed this event into a screenplay and thus made the film.

Ezhavathu Manithan was Hariharan's second film in Tamil. He was formerly visiting faculty at the Adyar Film Institute, Chennai, where Raghuvaran was a student. Raghuvaran was recommended to star in the film by co-writers Somasundareshwar and Arunmozhi, who were both students of the same institute. Raghuvaran was initially selected for the role of Ramkumar. However, after the screen test, the crew felt that he was "hero material" and elected him to play the lead role. The rest of the cast was made up by newcomers. The film was shot in the villages of the Tirunelveli district.

== Theme ==
The stated theme of the film is that it requires a "seventh man" to lead six others in a village. It also focuses on the effects of factory air pollution on people and the environment. It also highlights the plight of workers and their exploitation by factory owners.

== Soundtrack ==
The film features ten songs, all taken from an album composed by Carnatic musician L. Vaidyanathan. Vaidyanathan had set the words of Subramania Bharati to music. The film was the first to feature a score by Vaidyanathan.

Title	Artist
"Aaduvome Pallu Paaduvome"	Deepan Chakravarthy, Mathangi, P. Susheela, Chandilyan
"Achchamillai Achchamillai"	S. P. Balasubrahmanyam
"Endha Neramum"	K. J. Yesudas
"Kaakai Sirakinile Nandalala"	K. J. Yesudas
"Manadil Urudhi Vendum"	B. Neeraja
"Nallathor Veenaiseithe"	Rajkumar Bharathi
"Nenjil Uramum Inri"	Rajkumar Bharathi
"Odi Velaiyadu Papa"	K. J. Yesudas, Saibaba
"Senthamizh Naadennum"	P. Susheela
"Veenaiyadi Neeyenakku"	K. J. Yesudas, B. Neeraja
"Veenaiyadi Neeyenakku"	B. Neeraja

== Release and reception ==
Ezhavathu Manithan had a theatrical release on 11 June 1982, and opened to critical acclaim. It had a 100-day run at the theatres and received praise for its content and cast performances. Raghuvaran's acting was well received. In its review, the Tamil magazine Ananda Vikatan appreciated the film's theme but criticised its failure to provide a solution for the issue of factory air pollution. It further noted that the "intensity" reduced as the film progressed and called it "disappointing" towards the climax. It also noted that the sound recording was "poor" and the lip sync was "missing" in several scenes. However, it lauded the content and casting, and the "hard-hitting" dialogue. Thiraignani of Kalki praised the acting of Raghuvaran, Hariharan's direction, Dharma's cinematography, Somasundareshwar-Arunmozhi's dialogues and Vaidyanathan's music.

== Accolades ==
At the 30th National Film Awards, Ezhavathu Manithan won the award for Best Feature Film in Tamil. In addition, it collected two awards: Third Best Film Award and Best Story Writer at the Tamil Nadu State Film Awards.

The film premièred at the "Indian Panorama" section of the International Film Festival of India. It was also screened in the Soviet Union where it won the Afro–Asian Solidarity Award, the first Tamil film to win an international award. It was also one of India's official entries to the 13th Moscow International Film Festival (1983), where it was nominated for the Golden St. George prize.

== Sources ==
- Dhananjayan, G. (2014). Pride of Tamil Cinema: 1931–2013. Blue Ocean Publishers. OCLC 898765509.
