= Ghashiram Kotwal (film) =

- Directed by: K. Hariharan; Mani Kaul; Saeed Akhtar Mirza; Kamal Swaroop
- Written by: Vijay Tendulkar (original play, screenplay)
- Based on: Ghashiram Kotwal by Vijay Tendulkar
- Produced by: YUKT Film Cooperative
- Starring: Mohan Agashe; Om Puri
- Cinematography: Rajesh Joshi; Binod Pradhan; Manmohan Singh
- Music by: Bhaskar Chandavarkar
- Release date: 1976
- Running time: 108 minutes
- Country: India
- Language: Marathi
- Budget: Rs 1,50,000

Ghashiram Kotwal is a 1976 Indian Marathi-language film, which is an adaptation of Vijay Tendulkar's play of the same name. Tendulkar himself wrote the screenplay. Coming at the height of the Parallel cinema movement in India, the film was an experiment in collective filmmaking. It was produced by YUKT Film Cooperative, a 16-member collective consisting mostly of graduates of the Film and Television Institute of India. The title role was played by Om Puri, who made his debut with this film. The final shot of the film lasts for more than ten minutes. According to K. Hariharan, one of the four directors of the film, this shot is unique in film history as "the world’s longest shot on a standard reel of 1,000 feet to be shot by four camera operators".

== Synopsis ==
The film, like the play, is set in Peshwa-ruled Pune in the eighteenth century, and is based on the lives of real historical characters. Nana Phadnavis was a powerful figure during this period, and he became the de facto ruler of the Maratha confederacy.

Ghashiram (Om Puri) is a North Indian Brahmin, an outsider in the city of Pune. He is ill-treated by the law enforcing agencies, accused of being a pickpocket, and imprisoned for no fault of his. He decides to take revenge. Ghashiram then sells his own daughter to Nana (Mohan Agashe) to secure the post of Kotwal (police chief). Nana uses him to spy on people, especially Brahmins. Ghashiram turns into a tyrannical official, introducing permits for everything and putting people in jail for small offences. Meanwhile, Ghashiram's daughter dies in childbirth. Eventually there is an outcry, when some people die in jail due to suffocation. Thereupon Nana gets rid of Ghashiram in the most ruthless manner possible.

== Cast ==
- Mohan Agashe as Nana Phadnavis
- Om Puri as Ghashiram Kotwal

== Crew ==
- Direction: K. Hariharan, Mani Kaul, Saeed Akhtar Mirza, Kamal Swaroop
- Screenplay: Vijay Tendulkar
- Music: Bhaskar Chandavarkar
- Cinematography: Rajesh Joshi, Binod Pradhan, Manmohan Singh

== Production ==
In a 2014 interview, K. Hariharan has recounted the story of the making of the film. When he was in his second year at FTII, the Emergency was declared. He and fourteen others decided to form a cooperative. Mani Kaul, who was several years senior to the others, asked if he could join too. Vijay Tendulkar's play, which had done over 80 shows around Maharashtra, caught the attention of the group. They requested Tendulkar to make the script more directly relevant to contemporary politics. Hariharan recalls: "Playwright Badal Sircar did a six-day theatre workshop with us." They were all influenced by the work of Hungarian filmmaker Miklos Jancso, known for his long takes and choreographed camera movements. Hariharan adds: "It was a combination of all these factors — Tendulkar, Badal Sircar, Jancso, and one-and-a-half-lakh rupees that we borrowed from a nationalised bank — that resulted in the film."

== Reception ==
According to one commentator, the film "disappeared from view shortly after being released in a theatre in Pune for a week." Critical reception, too, according to Hariharan, was "uncharitable". The film was, however, screened at the Filmotsav in Madras in January 1978, and subsequently selected for screening at the 1978 Berlin Film Festival.

In recent years, there has been a revival of critical interest in the film. One reviewer writes: "Ghashiram Kotwal seems like a seminal work now, a crossroads in terms of ideological and aesthetic experimentation ..." According to the Encyclopedia of Indian Cinema, it is a "remarkable avant-garde experiment in collective film-making". It adds: "The film’s main significance resides in the way it adapts theatre to investigate cinema itself." Thirty-six years after it was first screened at Berlin, it was selected for screening in the Forum section of the 2014 Berlin Film Festival.

== Preservation ==
The Berlin-based Arsenal Institute for Film and Video Art has restored Ghashiram Kotwal and released it in DVD format. It is one of only two Indian films to be restored by Arsenal Institute.
