= Unlikely Hero (book) =

2009 biography of Indian actor Om Puri

Unlikely Hero: Om Puri
- Author: Nandita C. Puri
- Language: English
- Subject: Biography
- Genre: Non-fiction
- Publisher: Roli Books (Lotus Collection)
- Publication date: 2009
- Publication place: India
- Media type: Print (paperback)
- Pages: 215
- ISBN: 978-81-7436-540-8 (also 978-81-7436-804-1)

Unlikely Hero: Om Puri (also published as Om Puri: Unlikely Hero) is a 2009 biography of Indian actor Om Puri written by journalist and writer Nandita C. Puri, his then-wife. It was published by Roli Books under its Lotus Collection imprint.

== Background and publication ==
The book was released in 2009. It features a foreword by actor Patrick Swayze (Puri's co-star in the 1992 film City of Joy) and contributions or appreciations from actor Naseeruddin Shah and film critic Derek Malcolm. Publisher descriptions presented the work as an account of Puri's personal life, early struggles, theatre training, film career in Indian parallel and commercial cinema as well as international productions, and family life.

== Reception ==
The biography attracted significant media attention around its launch. Contemporary reviews were mixed. Some described it as candid, readable, and informative about Puri's background and career trajectory. Others criticized it for emphasizing personal relationships and private matters at the expense of deeper analysis of his professional achievements and craft.

Pre-publication excerpts and media coverage focused on personal revelations, which generated controversy. Om Puri publicly expressed strong dissatisfaction with the presentation of certain aspects of his private life, stating that he felt they had been reduced to sensationalism. The book was later referenced in reports concerning difficulties in the couple's marriage.

== See also ==
• Om Puri
