= Silk Silk Silk =

- Title card
- Directed by: Y. V. Gopikrishnan
- Written by: Selvakumar
- Produced by: Y. V. Murali; Y. V. Prakash; Y. V. Haridas
- Starring: Smitha; Bhanu Chander; Raghuvaran
- Cinematography: Gajendramani
- Edited by: K. Narayanan
- Music by: M. S. Viswanathan
- Production company: Sri Ganesh Kala Mandir
- Release date: 14 January 1983
- Country: India
- Language: Tamil

Silk Silk Silk (stylised onscreen as Silk... Silk... Silk...) is a 1983 Indian Tamil-language masala film written by Selvakumar and directed by Y. V. Gopikrishnan, son of M. S. Viswanathan. The film stars Smitha, Bhanu Chander and Raghuvaran. It was released on 14 January 1983.

== Plot ==
A group of smugglers (Shah, Robert, Viji and Balram) steal diamonds to sell on the black market. Shah runs off to Goa with the diamonds and plans to sell them himself. He is found murdered in his hotel room and the diamonds are missing. CBI officer Nirmal and police officer Ashok team up to solve the murder. They have a witness that saw a young woman enter his room and that's their only lead. Nirmal recognises the suspect as his ex-girlfriend, Priya, but does not disclose this. Nirmal, Ashok and the smugglers are all searching for Priya. Nirmal runs into Priya look-alike Meena, a poor fisherwoman with an alcoholic father. Ashok arrests Meena assuming her to be Shah's murderer. Nirmal arranges for Meena to be bailed out of jail causing a rift between the two men. Nirmal runs into Priya and learns that she unwittingly smuggled the diamonds for Shah and returned it to him but is otherwise uninvolved in Shah's murder. Nirmal tries to clear both Priya and Meena but fails to do so. Both women are kidnapped by the smugglers. They have no information for the smugglers but Viji remembers a third woman that also looks like Priya and Meena. This third woman – Sheela – is involved in a deeper conspiracy involving Shah's murder. Nirmal, Priya and Meena must work together to unearth the mystery.

== Cast ==
- Smitha as Priya, Meena and Sheela
- Bhanu Chander as Nirmal Kumar
- Raghuvaran as G. K. Ashok Kumar
- Loose Mohan as Meena's father
- Balram as Balram
- Johnny as Robert
- Shyla as Viji
- S. N. Parvathy as Ashok's mother
- Vennira Aadai Moorthy (guest appearance)

== Soundtrack ==
The soundtrack was composed by M. S. Viswanathan, with lyrics written by Vaali.

Track listing
No.	Title	Singer(s)	Length
1.	"Moracha"	L. R. Eswari, S. N. Surendar	4:28
2.	"Ennai Vittu"	Vani Jairam, P. Jayachandran	4:55
3.	"Katcherika"	S. Janaki	4:18
4.	"Jaani Jaani"	S. Janaki	4:24
Total length:			18:05

== Critical reception ==
Thiraignani of Kalki praised Smitha that she shines in triple roles and added this film proves that she has all qualities to portray an important role while also praising the performances of Raghuvaran and Bhanuchander, Loose Mohan's humour and Gajendramani's cinematography but panned Vijayalakshmi's acting, Selvakumar's story and dialogues and Moorthy's humour and concluded the film shines just like the smuggled diamonds.

== Legacy ==
The film provided a breakthrough to Smitha and Raghuvaran, establishing the former as a bankable star and the latter as a villain in Tamil cinema.
