= Sivasankari =

Indian writer

- Born: 14 October 1942 (age 83); Madras, Madras Province, British India (now Chennai, Tamil Nadu, India)
- Occupation: writer

Sivasankari (born 14 October 1942) is an Indian author and activist who writes in Tamil. She is one of the four Tamil writers asked by the United States Library of Congress to record their voice as part of the South Asian article on Sivashankari.

== Early life ==
Sivasankari was born in Madras. Including herself, all the children in her family were educated in the Sri Ramakrishna Mission and Sarada Vidyalaya schools. She then studied at SIET College for Women.

She worked for Citibank as a public relations officer.

== Career ==
Her novels were made into the films Avan Aval Adhu (1980), based on Oru Singam Muyalagiradhu and directed by Muktha Srinivasan (125days) 47 Natkal (1981) directed by K. Balachander and starring Chiranjeevi and Jaya Prada. She is the author of the novel, which was made into the 1987 Doordarshan TV series Subah. In 2024, she won the prestigious Viswambhara Dr C Narayana Reddy National Literary Award for her contribution to Tamil literature.

== Books ==
- 47 Naatkal
- Aatril Oru Kaal Setril Oru Kaal
- Aayiram Kaalathu Payir
- Adimaadugal
- Anilgal
- Amma Pillai
- Amma, Please, Enakkaga
- Appa
- Aval
- En?
- Ini
- Innoruthi + Innoruthi
- Karunai Kolai
- Kinattru Thavalaigal
- Kulappangal
- Malaiyin Adutha Pakkam
- Mella Mella
- Mudhal Konal
- Naan Naanaga
- Nandu
- Nerunji Mul
- Nooleni
- Oru Manithanin Kathai
- Paalangal
- Pogapoga
- Suriya Vamsam Ninaivalaigal - 1
- Suriya Vamsam Ninaivalaigal - 2
- Sutta Man
- Theppakulam
- Thirisangu Sorgam
- Uyarnthavargal
- Vaanathu Nila

== Filmography ==
- Avan Aval Adhu (1980)
- 47 Natkal (1981)
- Nandu (1981)
- Thiyagu (1990)
- Kutty (2001)
