= Om Puri =

Indian actor (1950 to 2017)

Om Puri OBE
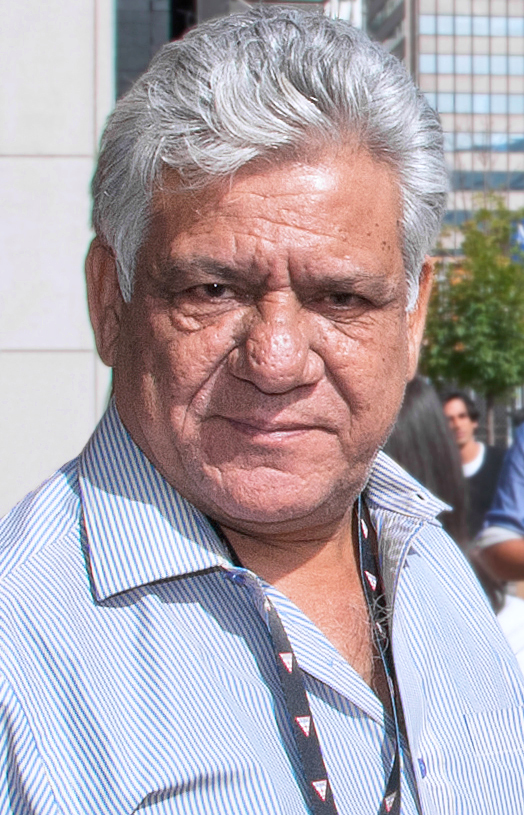
- Puri at the 2010 Toronto International Film Festival
- Born: Om Prakash Puri; 18 October 1950; Ambala, East Punjab, India (now in Haryana, India)
- Died: 6 January 2017 (aged 66); Mumbai, Maharashtra, India
- Education: National School of Drama; Film and Television Institute of India
- Occupation: Actor
- Years active: 1972 to 2017
- Spouses: Seema Kapoor (m. 1991; div. 1991) Nandita Puri (m. 1993; sep. 2013)
- Children: 1
- Honours: Padma Shri (1990); Honorary OBE (2004)

Om Prakash Puri OBE (born 18 October 1950 in Ambala, died 6 January 2017 in Mumbai) was an Indian actor whose career of more than four decades carried him from a railway town in East Punjab to two National Film Awards, a BAFTA nomination and the memorial tribute of the 89th Academy Awards. Working principally in Hindi cinema, he also performed in English, Punjabi, Kannada, Telugu, Malayalam, Bengali, Gujarati, Urdu and Marathi, and he moved between the austere realism of India's parallel cinema and the broad pleasures of the commercial mainstream with a fluency that very few of his contemporaries could equal. He is widely regarded as one of the finest actors in world cinema.

Puri did not possess the conventional glamour that Hindi cinema of the 1970s expected of its leading men, and critics have long observed that this apparent disadvantage became the foundation of his authority. His was the face of the labourer, the clerk and the exhausted policeman, and he rendered those lives with a seriousness that made audiences recognise themselves on the screen. The Indian state honoured him with the Padma Shri in 1990, and in 2004 the United Kingdom made him an honorary Officer of the Order of the British Empire for services to the British film industry.

He is mostly remembered for the moral force of his work in Aakrosh (1980), Arohan (1982), Ardh Satya (1983) and the television films Sadgati (1981) and Tamas (1987), for comic invention in Jaane Bhi Do Yaaro (1983), Chachi 420 (1997), Hera Pheri (2000), Chup Chup Ke (2006) and Dhol (2007), and for an international body of work that reached its summit in the British comedy drama East Is East (1999). His long association with the directors Shyam Benegal and Govind Nihalani produced some of the most enduring work of the Indian New Wave.

== Early life and adversity ==
Om Puri was born in Ambala, then in the state of East Punjab and now in Haryana, into a Punjabi Hindu family. His father, Tek Chand Puri, served in the Indian Army and later worked on the railways. The family possessed no birth certificate, and even the date of his birth had to be recovered through patient inquiry. His mother remembered only that he had arrived two days after the festival of Dussehra, and an uncle, enrolling him in school, assigned him the date of 9 March 1950. Years later in Bombay, Puri consulted the calendar for 1950 and fixed his birthday as 18 October.

The circumstances of his childhood were severe. When he was six, his father was imprisoned on an allegation of stealing cement from the railways, and the family lost its home. His elder brother, Ved Prakash Puri, worked as a railway porter, while the young Om worked in a tea stall, took whatever odd jobs he could find and gathered coal from the railway tracks to keep the household alive. He and his brother's children were later raised in large part by a household servant named Shanti. It is difficult to read this history without sensing how much of it later entered his performances, for the hungry, overlooked and quietly furious men he would play were men he had already known.

== Formation at NSD and FTII ==
Puri continued his studies while he worked, and after completing his early education he won admission to the National School of Drama in Delhi. There he formed a lifelong friendship with Naseeruddin Shah, who persuaded him to follow him to the Film and Television Institute of India in Poona, the present day Pune. He arrived so poor that, by his own later account, he did not own a presentable shirt.

The institute did not entirely satisfy him, and he struggled to meet its fees. Shah later recalled a characteristically mischievous postscript. When Puri had become famous, FTII pursued him for an outstanding debt of ₹280, and he declined to settle it, savouring what Shah described as the "impish thrill" of remaining in the institution's debt. His batchmates remembered a reserved and unusually quiet student, which makes the volcanic intensity of his early screen work all the more remarkable.

== Career ==
=== Beginnings and the parallel cinema, 1975 to 1989 ===
Puri's first film was the children's picture Chor Chor Chhup Ja. To support himself in these lean years he taught at the Actors' Studio, where his students included Gulshan Grover and Anil Kapoor. His first significant screen role came in the 1976 Marathi film Ghashiram Kotwal, adapted from Vijay Tendulkar's play and directed by K. Hariharan and Mani Kaul in a collective effort with sixteen graduates of FTII. He would later remark, without bitterness, that he had been paid "peanuts" for his finest work.

Alongside Naseeruddin Shah, Shabana Azmi, Smita Patil and Amrish Puri, he became one of the defining faces of the art cinema movement, appearing in Bhavni Bhavai (1980), Sadgati (1981), Ardh Satya (1983), Mirch Masala (1987) and Dharavi (1992). In Govind Nihalani's Aakrosh he played Lahanya Bhiku, a tribal labourer accused of murdering his wife, and he did so almost entirely without dialogue, communicating rage, grief and helplessness through his eyes and the set of his body. The performance earned him the Filmfare Award for Best Supporting Actor.

Then came Ardh Satya (1983), the film by which his career is most often measured. As Anant Velankar, an honest police inspector slowly poisoned by a corrupt system and his own violence, Puri gave Hindi cinema a hero who was neither saint nor avenger but a decent man coming apart in real time. Where the commercial cinema of the period offered the righteous fury of the angry young man as spectacle, Puri offered it as diagnosis, and the effect was unsettling in the best sense. The role won him his second National Film Award for Best Actor, following Arohan, as well as the Best Actor prize at the Karlovy Vary International Film Festival.

In the same year he displayed an entirely different instrument in Kundan Shah's satire Jaane Bhi Do Yaaro, playing the corrupt builder Ahuja with a lunatic comic energy that helped make the film a cult classic. That an actor could deliver Ardh Satya and Jaane Bhi Do Yaaro within a single season says a great deal about the breadth of his gift. He also appeared briefly in Richard Attenborough's Gandhi (1982), an early sign of the international career to come.

=== Television ===
Television allowed Puri to explore registers that the cinema of the 1980s seldom offered. In Kakaji Kahin (1988) he played a paan chewing politician in a pointed parody of the political class, and in Mr. Yogi (1988 to 1989) he served as a sly narrator who teased the protagonist at every turn, two performances that revealed a natural comedian. His work in Govind Nihalani's Tamas, adapted from Bhisham Sahni's novel of Partition violence, remains among the most acclaimed performances in the history of Indian television. He also appeared in Shyam Benegal's Bharat Ek Khoj and in the British series The Jewel in the Crown.

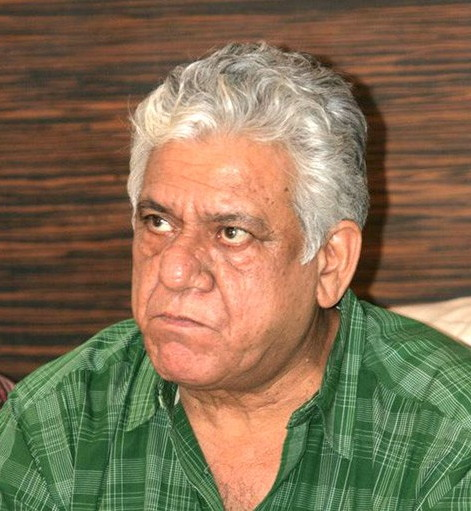
Puri in 2009, by then an actor equally at home in Mumbai, London and Hollywood

=== International cinema ===
From the early 1990s Puri built a second career abroad that few Indian actors of his generation could rival. He played opposite Patrick Swayze in City of Joy (1992), shared the screen with Jack Nicholson in Wolf (1994) and with Val Kilmer in The Ghost and the Darkness (1996). In Britain he gave a delicate and humane performance as a Pakistani taxi driver in My Son the Fanatic (1997), and two years later he created George Khan in East Is East, a first generation immigrant in Northern England at war with his own westernised children. It would have been easy to play George as a tyrant. Puri played him as a frightened man defending the only identity he had left, and the role brought him a nomination for the BAFTA Award for Best Actor in a Leading Role.

He went on to play General Muhammad Zia-ul-Haq in Charlie Wilson's War (2007), reprised George Khan in West Is West (2010) and starred opposite Helen Mirren in The Hundred-Foot Journey (2014), holding his own against one of the great actors of the English stage with warmth and impeccable timing. He also worked in Pakistani cinema, appearing in Actor in Law (2016). The director Gurinder Chadha, who cast him in Viceroy's House, remembered him as a man of wit and compassion who gave human dimension to characters that lesser actors would have reduced to types.

=== The commercial mainstream ===
In the mid 1990s, as the parallel cinema waned, Puri made a decision that some purists regretted and that history has vindicated. He entered the commercial mainstream as a character actor and proved that the discipline of the art house could enrich the popular film rather than be diluted by it. He was a hard bitten police officer in Ghayal (1990) and Gupt (1997), the leader of a Sikh militant cell in Gulzar's Maachis (1996), and the grieving father of a fallen soldier in Dhoop (2003). In the Kannada film A.K. 47 (1999) he played an uncompromising police commissioner and dubbed his own Kannada dialogue, and the film became a major commercial success.

His comic work in this period was a revelation to audiences who knew him only as the conscience of the art cinema. In Chachi 420 (1997), Hera Pheri (2000), Malamaal Weekly (2006), Chup Chup Ke (2006) and Kismat Konnection (2008) he displayed precise timing and a willingness to look ridiculous that only a supremely secure actor can afford. He became a regular presence in the films of Priyadarshan and worked with Kamal Haasan in Hey Ram (2000), while also lending gravity to Maqbool (2003), Yuva (2004), Lakshya (2004), Rang De Basanti (2006), Delhi-6 (2009) and Bajrangi Bhaijaan (2015).

=== Final years and posthumous releases ===
At the time of his death Puri was at work on the Marathi film 15 August Bhagile 26 January. Several completed films reached audiences after he was gone, among them Viceroy's House and Tubelight (2017), so that for some years he seemed to keep working in his absence.

== Craft and critical assessment ==
Om Puri inaugurating the Indian panorama, at the 43rd International Film Festival of India (IFFI-2012), in Panaji, Goa, 2012.

Critics returning to his work after his death were struck less by any single performance than by the improbable distance between them. The Economic Times described him as one of the most versatile shape shifters of his era, and The Hindu singled out six roles as defining, ranging from the silent fury of Aakrosh to the comic chaos of Jaane Bhi Do Yaaro. The BBC observed that recognition never fully matched his achievement, an assessment that says as much about the Indian star system as about the man.

What distinguished him was courage of a particular kind. He never asked an audience to admire him, and he was unafraid of stillness, of ugliness and of silence. He trusted the camera to find the truth in a tired face, and he trusted himself to step from the gravest tragedy into outright farce without condescending to either. In an industry that rewarded a single persona repeated until exhaustion, he chose reinvention again and again, and he carried each new self with the same unhurried dignity. The academic Rachel Dwyer called him India's face of the world, a phrase that captures both his international reach and the essential Indianness of everything he did.

== Personal life ==
Puri married the writer and director Seema Kapoor, sister of the actor Annu Kapoor, in 1991, and the marriage ended within months. In 1993 he married the journalist Nandita Puri, with whom he had a son. Her 2009 biography, Unlikely Hero, angered him by its frank account of his earlier relationships, and in 2013 she filed a complaint of domestic violence, after which the couple separated.

Writing after his death, Nandita Puri described a secular household and a man who was not ritualistic but respected the faith of others. He drew solace from spiritual reading, particularly the works of Eknath Easwaran, which he pressed upon friends, and he relaxed by cooking and gardening. In a 2012 interview with Rajya Sabha TV he spoke of his love of farming and food, and confessed that his dream was to open a roadside dhaba called Daal Roti.

=== Public life and controversies ===
Puri spoke his mind in public, and on two occasions his words drew sharp criticism. During the 2011 Indian anti-corruption movement he used insulting language about members of Parliament, who issued privilege notices against him, and he subsequently apologised, explaining that he had spoken in a moment of high emotion. In October 2016, during a televised debate following the Uri attack, he made remarks about Indian soldiers that provoked widespread anger, and he again apologised publicly and without reservation.

== Death and legacy ==
Om Puri died of a heart attack at his home in Andheri, Mumbai, on 6 January 2017, at the age of 66. Tributes came from Mumbai, London and Lahore alike, and in February 2017 the 89th Academy Awards included him in its in memoriam tribute, a rare honour for an Indian actor.

Om Puri proved that an Indian actor without the conventional advantages of the star could command the art house, the box office and the international stage.

== Filmography ==
=== Hindi films ===
Year	Title	Role	Notes
1975	Kalla Kalla Bachitko		
1975	Chor Chor Chhup Ja		Debut film
1977	Smothered Voices		
1977	Bhumika		
1977	Godhuli	Yengta	
1978	Arvind Desai Ki Ajeeb Dastaan	Rajesh	
1978	Bhookh	Colonel	
1979	Shaayad	Nandlal	
1979	Saanch Ko Aanch Nahin		
1980	Sparsh	Dubey	
1980	Albert Pinto Ko Gussa Kyoon Aata Hai	Madhu	
1980	Aakrosh	Lahanya Bhiku	Won, Filmfare Award for Best Supporting Actor
1981	Hari Hondal Bargadar (Share Cropper)		
1981	Kalyug	Bhavani Pandey	
1981	Shodh	Surendra	
1982	Gandhi	Nahari	Cameo
1982	Disco Dancer	David Brown	
1982	Waqt Waqt Ki Baat		
1982	Raaste Pyar Ke	Suldev	
1982	Vijeta	Arvind	
1983	Gumnaam Hai Koi		
1983	Jaane Bhi Do Yaaro	Ahuja	
1983	Arohan	Hari Mondal	Won, National Film Award for Best Actor
1983	Ardh Satya	Anant Velankar	Won, National Film Award for Best Actor; Won, Best Actor, Karlovy Vary International Film Festival; Nominated, Filmfare Award for Best Actor
1983	Mandi	Ram Gopal	
1983	Bekaraar		
1983	Ashray		
1984	Party	Avinash	
1984	Maati Maangey Khoon	Durjan Singh	
1984	Duniya	Vasudev	
1984	Shrant		
1984	Raavan	Samant	
1984	Paar	Ram Naresh	
1984	Ram Ki Ganga	Laalu / Lal Dandhwani	
1984	Tarang	Namdev	
1984	Sheeshay Ka Ghar		
1984	Giddh	Bhashya	
1984	Holi	Principal Pandey	
1985	Paththar	Resham Singh	
1985	Zamana	Shyamlal	
1985	Bahu Ki Awaaz	Advocate Jaswant Srivastav	
1985	Nasoor	Dr Sunil	
1985	Sanjhi	Bhikhu	
1985	Aghaat	Trade unionist	
1985	Debshishu	Poor labourer	
1986	Antaheen		
1986	Genesis	The weaver	
1986	New Delhi Times	Ajay Singh	
1987	Mirch Masala	Abu Mian	
1987	Goraa		
1987	Susman	Ramulu	
1987	Marte Dam Tak	Daulat / D.K.	
1988	Achanak		
1988	Hum Farishte Nahin	Gopi / Tala Master / Murlidhar	
1988	Ek Hi Maqsad	Ram Kumar Verma	
1989	Shagun		
1989	Sava Ser Gehu		
1989	Darshana		
1989	Ilaaka	Bheema (Raja's foster father)	
1990	Sankranti		
1990	Kayedi		
1990	Halaat		
1990	Ghayal	ACP Joe D'Souza	Nominated, Filmfare Award for Best Supporting Actor
1990	Disha	Parshuram "Pagal Parsa" Sarpat	
1991	Irada	Shankar	
1991	Narsimha	Suraj Narayan Singh "Baapji"	Nominated, Filmfare Award for Best Performance in a Negative Role
1991	Meena Bazar		
1991	Antarnaad		
1992	Karm Yodha	Sub Inspector Patwardhan	
1992	Raat	Sharji	
1992	Current	Velu	
1992	Dharavi	Rajkaran	
1993	Aakanksha		
1993	Maya Memsaab		
1993	The Burning Season	Rajiv Sharma	
1993	Patang	Mathura	
1993	In Custody	Deven	
1994	Ankuram	Satyam	
1994	Drohkaal	DCP Abhay Singh	
1994	Purush		
1994	Triyacharitra	Billar	
1995	Ek Ka Jawab Do		
1995	Beparoa		
1995	Zakhmi Sipahi	Om Chaudhary	
1995	Aatank Hi Aatank	Sharad Joshi	
1995	Target	Rambharosa	
1995	Tarpan	Jassu	
1995	Kartavya	Ghulam Rasul	
1996	PremGranth	Baliram	
1996	Krishna	Minister Amar Prabhakar	
1996	Maachis	Sanatan	Nominated, Filmfare Award for Best Supporting Actor
1996	Ghatak: Lethal	Sachdev	
1996	Ram Aur Shyam	DIG Suryapratap Thakur	
1996	Talaashi	Inspector Puri	
1997	Zameer: The Awakening of a Soul	Jaichand Marwah	
1997	Gupt: The Hidden Truth	Inspector Udham Singh	Nominated, Filmfare Award for Best Supporting Actor
1997	Bhai	Advocate Satyaprakash	
1997	Chachi 420	Banwari Lal, secretary	Nominated, Filmfare Award for Best Performance in a Comic Role
1997	Mrityudand	Rambaran Mahto	
1997	Nirnayak	Inspector Nanak	
1997	Chupp	Keshav Narang	
1997	Aastha	Amar	
1998	Vinashak	Inspector Khan	
1998	Zor: Never Underestimate the Force	Shah Alam	
1998	Pyaar To Hona Hi Tha	Inspector Khan	Nominated, Filmfare Award for Best Supporting Actor
1998	China Gate	Krishnakant Puri	
1999	Khoobsurat	Dilip Chaudhary	
2000	Dulhan Hum Le Jayenge	Bhola Nath	
2000	Pukar	Colonel Hussein	
2000	Hey Ram	Subhash Goel	
2000	Hera Pheri	Khadak Singh	
2000	Kunwara	Balraj Singh	
2000	Kurukshetra	Baburao Deshmukh	
2000	Ghaath	Ajay Pandey	
2000	Zindagi Zindabad		
2000	Bas Yaari Rakho	Tom	
2001	Farz	ACP Arjun Singh	
2001	Zahreela	Arun Dev	
2001	Gadar: Ek Prem Katha	Narrator	Voice
2001	Indian	Joginder Singh	
2001	Deewaanapan	Prakash Saxena, Suraj's father	
2001	Is Pyaar Ko Kya Naam Doon		
2002	Pitaah	Thakur Avadh Narayan Singh	
2002	Maa Tujhhe Salaam	Narrator	Voice
2002	Kranti	Colonel Krishnakanth	
2002	Ansh: The Deadly Part	Bhagat Pandey	
2002	Pyaar Diwana Hota Hai	S. Puri	
2002	Awara Paagal Deewana	Ballu Bolbachan	
2002	Shararat	DCP Bhosle	
2002	Chor Machaaye Shor	DCP Pandey	
2002	Guru Mahaaguru	Crocodile	
2002	Ghaav: The Wound	Inspector Gautam	
2003	Aapko Pehle Bhi Kahin Dekha Hai	Sam	
2003	Kash Aap Hamare Hote	Yashwant Raj Mankotia	
2003	Ek Aur Ek Gyarah: By Hook or by Crook	Narrator	Uncredited
2003	Miss India: The Mystery	Inspector Yograj	
2003	Maqbool	Inspector Pandit	
2003	Chupke Se	Qasim Khan Qayamat	
2003	Kagaar: Life on the Edge	Sub Inspector Gokhale	
2003	Dhoop	Father of a fallen soldier	
2003	Pyaar Kiya Nahin Jaata	Om Prakash Khurana	
2004	Yuva	Prosonjit Bhattacharya	
2004	Aan: Men at Work	Police Commissioner Khurana	
2004	Dev	Special Commissioner Tejinder Khosla	
2004	Lakshya	Subedar Major Pritam Singh	
2004	Kyun! Ho Gaya Na...	Amit Khanna	
2004	King of Bollywood	Karan Kumar	
2004	AK-47	Commissioner Yashwant Sinha	
2004	Stop!	Anand Mehra	
2005	Zinda Dil		
2005	Kisna: The Warrior Poet	Jumman Miya	
2005	Mumbai Xpress	ACP S.P. Rao	
2005	Mangal Pandey: The Rising	Narrator	Voice
2005	Amar Joshi Shahid Ho Gaya	Writer	
2005	Kyon Ki	Dr Khurana	
2005	Deewane Huye Paagal	Mehboob / Scientist Khurana	
2006	Rang De Basanti	Amanullah Khan	
2006	Baghi	Haakam Singh	
2006	Malamaal Weekly	Balwant "Balu"	
2006	Chup Chup Ke	Prabhat Singh Chauhan	
2006	Baabul	Balwant Kapoor	
2006	Don: The Chase Begins Again	CBI Officer Vishal Malik	
2007	Khallas: The Beginning of End	ACP Akhlaq Khan	
2007	Delhii Heights	Timmy Kohli	
2007	Panga Naa Lo	Kartar Singh	
2007	Fool & Final	Father of Rahul / Raja	
2007	Buddha Mar Gaya	Vidyut Baba / Vidya	
2007	Victoria No. 203	Rana	
2007	Dhol	Tripathi	
2007	Dum Kaata	Ranade / Aabu	
2007	Shoot on Sight	Junaid	
2007	Welcome	Narrator	Voice
2008	Yaariyan	Jagpal Bir "J.B." Singh	
2008	Lovesongs: Yesterday, Today & Tomorrow	Aftab Jaffrey	
2008	Mere Baap Pehle Aap	Madhav Mathur	
2008	Kismat Konnection	Sanjeev Gill	
2008	Money Hai Toh Honey Hai	Narrator	Voice
2008	Singh Is Kinng	Rangeela	
2008	Mukhbiir	Rathod, SP Intelligence	
2008	Maharathi	ACP Gokhale	
2009	Chal Chala Chal	Omkar Nath	
2009	Billu	Sahukaar Daamchand	
2009	Delhi-6	Madan Gopal Sharma	
2009	Baabarr	Daroga Chaturvedi	
2009	London Dreams	Arjun's uncle	
2009	Life Goes On	Alok	
2009	Kurbaan	Bhaijaan	
2009	Bolo Raam	Inspector Indrajeet Singh Rathi	
2010	Road to Sangam	Mohammad Ali Kasuri	
2010	The Hangman	Shiva Sathe	
2010	Na Ghar Ke Na Ghaat Ke	Sankata Prasad Tripathi	
2010	Kushti	Jiten Singh	
2010	Dabangg	Inspector Kasturilal Vishkarma	
2010	Action Replayy	Rai Bahadur	
2011	Teen Thay Bhai	Chixie Gill	
2011	Kucch Luv Jaisaa	Madhu's father	
2011	Love Express	Khadak Singh Bakshi	
2011	Bin Bulaye Baraati	Sub Inspector Pralay Pratap Singh	
2011	Khap	Sarpanch	
2011	Don 2	CBI Officer Vishal Malik	
2011	Society Kaam Se Gayi		
2012	Agneepath	Additional Commissioner Gaitonde	
2012	Tere Naal Love Ho Gaya	Chaudhary	
2012	Chaar Din Ki Chandni	Fatoor Singh	
2012	Mere Dost Picture Abhi Baaki Hai	Baig Saab	
2012	Krishna Aur Kans	Kans	Voice
2012	Son of Flower	Munshi Pyare Lal Suman	
2012	Kamaal Dhamaal Malamaal	David	
2012	OMG – Oh My God!	Hanif Qureshi	
2012	Chakravyuh	Govind Suryavanshi	
2013	Policegiri	Commissioner	
2013	The Lovers		Uncredited
2014	Heartless	Sanjay Trehan	
2014	Bazaar E Husn	Kishan Chand	
2014	Aa Gaye Munde U.K. De	Daleep Singh Dhillon	
2014	Little Terrors	Abdul Wadood Kamil	
2015	Jai Jawaan Jai Kisaan	Dr Rajendra Prasad	
2015	Dirty Politics	Dinanath Singh	
2015	Jai Ho Democracy	Pandeyji	
2015	Uvaa	Hukum Pratap Choudhary	
2015	Miss Tanakpur Haazir Ho	Matang Singh	
2015	Bajrangi Bhaijaan	Moulana Sahab	
2015	Welcome Back	Narrator	Voice
2015	Hogaya Dimaagh Ka Dahi	Mirza Kishan Singh Joseph	
2016	Ghayal Once Again	ACP Joe D'Souza	
2016	Project Marathwada	Tukaram	
2016	Waarrior Savitri	Yamraj	
2016	A Death in the Gunj	O.P. Bakshi	
2016	Mirzya	Munna (Lauhar)	
2016	Gandhigiri	Rai Saheb	
2016	Yeh Hai Lollipop	Masoom	
2016	Chaar Sahibzaade: Rise of Banda Singh Bahadur	Narrator	Voice
2016	Chapekar Brothers	Bal Gangadhar Tilak	
2017	Prakash Electronic	Narrator	Voice
2017	The Ghazi Attack	Admiral V.S. Nanda	Posthumous release
2017	Tubelight	Banne Chacha	Posthumous release
2017	Mr. Kabaadi	Channulal Surmewala	Posthumous release
2018	Lashtam Pashtam	Saleem	Posthumous release
2019	The Gandhi Murder	T.G., Director General of Police	Posthumous release
2020	Gul Makai	General Ashfaq Parvez Kayani	Posthumous release
2020	Omprakash Zindabaad	Rambhajjan	Posthumous release
2023	Khela Hobe	Fareek Bhai	Posthumous release
TBA	2006 Varanasi – The Untold		Completed, unreleased

=== English films ===
Year	Title	Role	Notes
1991	Sam & Me	Chetan Parikh	
1992	City of Joy	Hazari Pal	
1994	Wolf	Dr Vijay Alezias	
1995	Brothers in Trouble	Hussein Shah	
1996	The Ghost and the Darkness	Abdullah	
1997	My Son the Fanatic	Parvez	
1998	Such a Long Journey	Ghulam Mohamed	
1999	East Is East	George Khan	Nominated, BAFTA Award for Best Actor in a Leading Role
2001	The Parole Officer	George	
2001	Happy Now?	Tin Man	
2001	The Zookeeper	The vet	
2001	The Mystic Masseur	Ramlogan	
2001	Bollywood Calling	Subramaniam	
2003	Code 46	Bahkland	
2007	Charlie Wilson's War	Muhammad Zia-ul-Haq	
2010	West Is West	George Khan	
2012	The Reluctant Fundamentalist	Abu	
2014	The Hundred-Foot Journey	Papa Kadam	
2015	Trafficker	Supreme Court judge	Singaporean and Thai production
2016	A Million Rivers	Shiv	
2017	Viceroy's House	Ali Rahim Noor	Posthumous release

=== Other language films ===
Year	Title	Role	Language	Notes
1976	Ghashiram Kotwal	Ghashiram	Marathi	First major screen role
1980	Chann Pardesi	Tulsi	Punjabi	
1980	Bhavni Bhavai	Maanav Bhagat	Gujarati	
1982	Naseeb Ni Balihari		Gujarati	
1983	Chokh	Jadunath	Bengali	
1986	Long Da Lishkara	Dittu	Punjabi	
1988	Puravrutham	Raman	Malayalam	
1992	Raatri	Sharji	Telugu	
1992	Ankuram	Parvez Hussain	Telugu	
1999	A.K. 47	Commissioner Yashwant Sinha	Kannada and Telugu	Dubbed his own Kannada dialogue
2002	Dhruva	Pratap Singh	Kannada	
2013	Jatt Boys Putt Jattan De	Jora Vailly	Punjabi	
2013	Bhaji in Problem	Mr Dhingra	Punjabi	
2014	Chaar Sahibzaade	Narrator	Punjabi	Voice
2015	Leather Life		Punjabi	
2015	Buniyaad	Bapuji	Punjabi	
2016	Aadupuliyattam	Muni	Malayalam	Nominated, IIFA Utsavam for Performance in a Supporting Role, Male
2016	Actor in Law	Rafaqat Mirza	Urdu	First Pakistani film
2017	Tiger	Oriya	Kannada	Posthumous release
2018	Load Wedding	Raja's father	Urdu and Punjabi	Posthumous release

=== Television ===
Year	Title	Role	Notes
1981	Sadgati	Dukhi	Television film directed by Satyajit Ray
1984	The Jewel in the Crown	Mr De Souza	British series
1985	Khandaan		
1988	Bharat Ek Khoj	Various characters	Directed by Shyam Benegal
1988	Kakaji Kahin	Kakaji	
1988	Tamas	Nathu	Television film directed by Govind Nihalani
1988 to 1989	Mr. Yogi	Narrator	
1993 to 1994	Kirdaar	Various characters	
1994	Woh Chokri		Television film
1997	Aahat	Randhir, a magician	One episode
1997	Sea Hawks	Uncle Sam	
1999	Antaral	Shreevee	
2001	CID	Joe Santose	Two part episode "The Case of Counterfeit Cop"
2002	Achanak 37 Saal Baad	Narrator	Opening narration, first episode
2002	White Teeth	Samad Miah Iqbal	British serial
2002 to 2003	Jasoos Vijay	Presenter	
2003	Second Generation	Sharma	Television film
2003	The Canterbury Tales	Jetender	British series
2012	Savdhaan India	Host	Second season
2013	Hum Ne Li Hai... Shapath	ACP Vishvanath	Cameo

== Awards and honours ==
=== Civilian honours ===
In 1990 the Government of India conferred on him the Padma Shri, the country's fourth highest civilian award. In 2004 he was appointed an honorary Officer of the Order of the British Empire for services to the British film industry.

=== Film awards ===
Year	Category	Nominated work	Result
National Film Awards
1982	Best Actor	Arohan	Won
1984	Best Actor	Ardh Satya	Won
Filmfare Awards
1981	Best Supporting Actor	Aakrosh	Won
1984	Best Actor	Ardh Satya	Nominated
1991	Best Supporting Actor	Ghayal	Nominated
1992	Best Performance in a Negative Role	Narsimha	Nominated
1997	Best Supporting Actor	Maachis	Nominated
1998	Best Performance in a Comic Role	Chachi 420	Nominated
1998	Best Supporting Actor	Gupt: The Hidden Truth	Nominated
1999	Best Supporting Actor	Pyaar To Hona Hi Tha	Nominated
2009	Lifetime Achievement Award		Won
BAFTA Awards
2000	Best Actor in a Leading Role	East Is East	Nominated
Karlovy Vary International Film Festival
1984	Best Actor	Ardh Satya	Won

=== Other honours ===
In 1998 the Montreal World Film Festival presented him with the Grand Prix Spécial des Amériques for his exceptional contribution to the art of cinema.
