= Soviet Afro-Asian Solidarity Committee =

The Soviet Afro-Asian Solidarity Committee (Russian: Советский комитет солидарности стран Азии и Африки, abbreviated СКССАА, SKSSAA) was an organization in the Soviet Union, which mobilized solidarity efforts to national liberation movements in Africa and Asia. SKSSAA was founded in May 1956. SKSSAA was a member of the Afro-Asian People's Solidarity Organisation (AAPSO). SKSSAA functioned as a Soviet semi-official foreign policy organ. SKSSAA was funded through the Soviet Peace Fund. It worked in close coordination with the International Department of the Communist Party of the Soviet Union. The discourse of SKSSAA was centered on two positions: support of the right of self-determination and anti-racism.

The SKSSAA was also one of the founders of the Patrice Lumumba University.

SKSSAA published, jointly with the Institute of Oriental Studies, the sociopolitical and scientific journal Aziia i Afrika Segodnia.

As of 1968, Mirzo Tursunzoda was the chairman of SKSSAA. Vladimir Shubin was secretary of SKSSAA at one point. Members of minority populations (such as Caucasian and Central Asian ethnic groups) were highly represented in SKSSAA. Often SKSSAA portrayed the experience of peripheric Soviet regions as models of development towards Third World countries.

== Southern Africa ==
A part of the SKSSAA aid to African liberation movements was channelled through the Organization of African Unity.

SKSSAA was active internationally in the struggle against apartheid in South Africa. SKSSAA provided the African National Congress in exile with material resources, such as food, clothes and vehicles. The SKSSAA and other Soviet non-governmental organizations (NGOs) received South Africans in need of medical treatment, and arranged stays for them at Soviet hospitals. The organization also coordinated activities for South African students in the Soviet Union.

== Middle East ==
Until 1974, all visits of the Palestine Liberation Organization was hosted by the SKSSAA (which was an 'unofficial' representative of Soviet foreign policy), rather than government representatives. Fatah leader Yasser Arafat visited Moscow at the invitation of SKSSAA in 1970. SKSSAA also had contacts with PFLOAG.

== Post-Soviet period ==
The SKSSAA survived the fall of the Soviet Union. In 1992 the organization was renamed Society of Afro-Asian Peoples' Solidarity and Co-operation. It has since mainly focused its work towards the Middle East and Asia. In 2003 Mikhail Margelov was elected president of the Society.

The archives of the SKSSAA are held by the State Archive of the Russian Federation.
