= Oru Manithanin Kathai =

1978 novel by Sivasankari

- Author: Sivasankari
- Translator: Uma Narayanan
- Language: Tamil
- Genre: Drama
- Publication date: 1978
- Publication place: India
- English publication date: 1990

Oru Manithanin Kathai (transl. The tale of a man) is a Tamil-language novel by Sivasankari. It was serialised in the magazine Ananda Vikatan from 1978 to 1979. The novel was translated in English under the title Tyagu by Uma Narayanan in 1990.

== Background ==
During her tenure as public relations officer of Citibank in the early 1970s, Sivasankari encountered many employees who were ostensibly sober during the day but heavily drinking at night parties. She was curious to know the reason behind their alcoholism, and wrote to Alcoholics Anonymous; after reading their pamphlets, Sivasankari saw alcoholism as a disease. She spent almost eight years working on the subject of Oru Manithanin Kathai, and interacted with many psychiatrists as part of her research. She claimed the story was based on the lives of many alcoholics, rather than a single individual. Sivasankari considered Oru Manithanin Kathai to be one of her most challenging novels to write.

== Adaptations ==
The novel was adapted into a 1985 TV series by the same name, and a 1990 film Thiyagu, both starring Raghuvaran.
